= Boxing in the 1970s =

During the 1970s, boxing was characterized by dominating champions and history-making rivalries. The decade had many superstars, who also had fierce rivals. Alexis Argüello, for example, who won the world Featherweight and Jr. Lightweight titles in the 1970s, had to overcome Alfredo Escalera twice before the decade was over.

At least six divisions had world champions who could be considered dominant: The Bantamweights had Carlos Zárate; the Super Bantamweights, (a division created in 1976) had Wilfredo Gómez winning the title in 1977 and keeping it until he left it vacant in 1983; the Lightweights had Roberto Durán, who won the title in 1972 and vacated it in 1979 to seek championships at other weights; the Jr. Welterweights had Antonio Cervantes, who reigned twice; the Middleweights had Carlos Monzón, sometimes referred to as King Carlos because of his seven-year reign as champion; the Light-Heavyweights had Bob Foster. The Heavyweights had Muhammad Ali, who ruled twice between 1974 and 1979.

Another aspect of boxing in the 1970s is that the decade is considered by a few to be the best ever for the Heavyweight division: Ali returned in 1970 from his forced retirement, and Joe Frazier was world champion when Ali returned. Former world champions Jimmy Ellis and Floyd Patterson as well as George Foreman, Oscar Bonavena, Jerry Quarry, Earnie Shavers, Leon Spinks, Ken Norton, as well as Larry Holmes, Ron Stander, Chuck Wepner, José Roman, Light Heavyweight champ Foster, John Tate, Jimmy Young, Ron Lyle, Joe Bugner, Scott LeDoux and many others added intrigue to the division. Don King surged as a leading boxing promoter, and champions Duran, Monzon and Ali had historic rivalries with Esteban De Jesús, Rodrigo Valdez and Frazier, respectively.

== 1970 ==
- February 16 – Joe Frazier becomes world Heavyweight champion by knocking out Jimmy Ellis in five rounds at New York City's Madison Square Garden.
- April 18 – Rubén Olivares begins his trilogy of world championship fights with Chucho Castillo by defeating Castillo with a fifteen-round unanimous decision in Inglewood.
- May 9 – Vicente Saldivar returns to the ring, with only one fight in the last two years, to win the WBC world Featherweight championship with a fifteen-round unanimous decision over Johnny Famechon in Rome, Italy.
- August 4 – George Foreman beats George Chuvalo by a technical knockout in round three in New York.
- September 26 – Ken Buchanan wins the world Lightweight title with a fifteen-round split decision over Ismael Laguna of Panama at San Juan, Puerto Rico.
- October 16 – Chapter 2 of Olivares-Castillo, as Chucho Castillo conquers the world Featherweight title with a fourteenth-round technical knockout of Rubén Olivares in Inglewood.
- October 26 – Muhammad Ali returns from his forced exile with a three-round stoppage of Jerry Quarry in Atlanta.
- November 7 – Carlos Monzón becomes world Middleweight champion by knocking out Nino Benvenuti in twelve rounds in Rome.
- November 18 – Joe Frazier retains his world Heavyweight crown with a two-round knockout of reigning world Light Heavyweight champion Bob Foster in Detroit.
- December 3 – Billy Backus beats José Nápoles by knockout in four rounds, winning the world Welterweight title in Syracuse.
- December 7 – In the 15th and final round, Muhammad Ali knocked down Oscar Bonavena 3 times and earned the win at Madison Square Garden.

== 1971 ==
- March 8 – The Fight of the Century: before a jet-set crowd that included Cher, Frank Sinatra, Woody Allen, Mia Farrow, Diana Ross and others, Joe Frazier drops Muhammad Ali in the fifteenth round and wins a unanimous decision to retain the world's Heavyweight title, at New York City's Madison Square Garden.
- March 16 – In what turn out to be Henry Cooper's final fight, he lost to Joe Bugner in a controversial 15-round decision as Bugner became the British, Commonwealth and European heavyweight champion in Cooper's hometown of London, England.
- April 3 – In the last chapter of the Olivares-Castillo trilogy, Rubén Olivares recovers from a knockdown to regain the world Featherweight title with a fifteen-round unanimous decision over Chucho Castillo in Inglewood.
- May 9 – Carlos Monzón retains his title with a three-round knockout of Nino Benvenuti in Monte Carlo, Monaco. It is Benvenuti's last fight.
- June 4 – José Nápoles recovers his world Welterweight title with an eighth-round knockout of Billy Backus in Inglewood.
- July 26 – Former world Heavyweight champion Muhammad Ali beats his friend and gymmate, former Heavyweight champion Jimmy Ellis, by a knockout in round twelve in Houston.
- August 9 – Rodrigo Valdez beats Bobby Cassidy by ten round unanimous decision in New York, but gets infected with Hepatitis, which Cassidy did not know he had before entering the ring. Both boxers then enter quarantine.
- September 25 – Carlos Monzón retains his world Middleweight championship with a fourteen-round knockout of multiple time world champion Emile Griffith in Buenos Aires, Argentina.
- November 5 – Pedro Carrasco becomes Spain's second world boxing champion, beating Mando Ramos by an eleventh round disqualification in Madrid, Spain to take the WBC's vacant world Lightweight title. This bout was extremely controversial; Ramos was disqualified because, after Carrasco hit the deck in round eleven, the referee decided to declare Carrasco the winner because he didn't know if Carrasco had been felled by a punch or a push.

== 1972 ==
- January 15 – Joe Frazier retains his world Heavyweight title with a five-round knockout of Terry Daniels in New Orleans.
- April 7 – Bob Foster recovers the WBA world Light-Heavyweight title, unifying it once again with his WBC championship, knocking out Vicente Rondon in two rounds at Miami. Rondon had become the second Latin American world Light Heavyweight champion when the WBA recognized him after Foster refused to defend the championship against him, but the WBC had kept Foster as world champion.
- May 1 – Muhammad Ali defeats George Chuvalo by unanimous decision
- May 26 – Joe Frazier retains his world Heavyweight title with a five-round knockout over Ron Stander in Omaha.
- June 26 – Roberto Durán wins the first of four world titles, knocking out WBA world Lightweight champion Ken Buchanan in thirteen rounds at New York City. The fight has a controversial ending: many believe that the blow with which Duran ended the fight was actually low and that he should have been disqualified.
- June 27 – Muhammad Ali knocks out Jerry Quarry in the seventh round of their Las Vegas rematch.
- September 20 – Muhammad Ali beats Floyd Patterson by a knockout in round seven of their rematch, held at New York. It is Patterson's last professional fight, he retires with a record of 55–8–1 with 40 knockouts.
- October 28 – Antonio Cervantes wins the WBA world Jr. Welterweight title for the first time, with a tenth-round knockout of defending champion Alfonso Peppermint Frazer in Panama City, Panama.
- November 17 – Esteban De Jesús begins his trilogy of fights with Roberto Durán by defeating the world Lightweight champion by a ten-round unanimous decision in New York. Durán suffers his first career defeat in the non-title fight.
- November 21 – Muhammad Ali defeats Bob Foster by 8th-round KO.

== 1973 ==
- January 22 – George Foreman becomes world Heavyweight champion, defeating Joe Frazier by knockout in round two at Kingston, Jamaica. It is the first fight televised on HBO Boxing.
- January 24 – WBA world Flyweight champion Masao Ohba dies after his car collided with a truck in Tokyo, Japan. He left a record of 35 wins, 2 losses and 1 draw, with 15 knockouts.
- March 31 – Ken Norton becomes the second boxer to defeat Muhammad Ali, breaking Ali's jaw en route to a twelve-round split decision in San Diego.
- May 5 – Eder Jofre wins the WBC world Featherweight title three years after his first retirement from boxing, defeating world champion Jose Legra by a fifteen-round majority decision in Brasília, Brazil.
- May 19 – Antonio Cervantes retains his WBA world Jr. Welterweight title with a five-round knockout of Alfonso Peppermint Frazer, in their Panama City, Panama rematch.
- June 2 – Carlos Monzón retains his world Middleweight title with a fifteen-round unanimous decision over Emile Griffith, at their rematch, held in Monte Carlo, Monaco.
- July 2 – Former world Heavyweight champion Joe Frazier returns to the ring, beating Joe Bugner by a twelve-round decision at London.
- September 1 – George Foreman retains his world Heavyweight title with a first-round knockout over José Roman, who becomes the first Puerto Rican to challenge for the world Heavyweight championship, in Tokyo.
- September 10 – Muhammad Ali avenges his loss to Ken Norton, beating Norton by a twelve-round split decision in Inglewood, California.
- November 3 – Arnold Taylor survives four knockdowns to knock out WBA world Bantamweight champion Romeo Anaya in fourteen rounds, winning the world title in Johannesburg, South Africa, in what boxing writer Chris Greyvenstein called probably the most murderous and dramatic (fight) in South African history.
- December 1 – In the first boxing fight pitting a Black man against a White man in South African history, Bob Foster, an African-American, retains his world Light Heavyweight championship with a fifteen-round unanimous decision over Pierre Fourie. It was, in addition, Foster's second fifteen-round decision win over Fourie.

== 1974 ==
- January 28 – Muhammad Ali avenges his defeat to Joe Frazier, beating Frazier by a unanimous decision in twelve rounds at New York City.
- February 9 – Carlos Monzón retains the world's Middleweight title with a seventh-round knockout over world Welterweight champion José Nápoles in Paris, France.
- February 16 – Alexis Argüello's first world title fight: he loses a fifteen-round unanimous decision to WBA world Featherweight champion Ernesto Marcel in Panama City, Panama. Marcel never fought again.
- March 16 – Roberto Durán avenges his loss to Esteban De Jesús, recovering from a first round knockdown to knock out the Puerto Rican in round eleven and retain his world Lightweight championship in Panama City, Panama.
- March 26 – George Foreman retains his world heavyweight championship with a second-round knockout over Ken Norton in Caracas, Venezuela.
- July 9 – Rubén Olivares conquers the vacant WBA world Featherweight championship with a seventh-round knockout over Zensuke Utagawa in Inglewood.
- July 17 – Bob Foster is knocked down in round thirteen, but retains his world Light-Heavyweight title with a draw (tie) with Jorge Ahumada in Albuquerque. It is Foster's last championship defense.
- August 24 – WBA world Jr. Lightweight champion Ben Villaflor, a Hawaiian-based Filipino, retains his world title with a second-round knockout of Japan's future world champion, Yasutsune Uehara, in Honolulu.
- October 30 – The Rumble in the Jungle: Muhammad Ali regains the world Heavyweight championship, joining Floyd Patterson as the two only boxers to achieve such a feat, by knocking out George Foreman in eight rounds at Zaire.
- November 23 – Alexis Argüello wins the first of three world titles, knocking out Rubén Olivares in the thirteenth round at Inglewood. He also becomes the first Nicaraguan world boxing champion.
- December 7 – Victor Galindez becomes the third Hispanic world Light-Heavyweight champion. The Argentine beats Len Hutchins by TKO in round thirteen to claim the vacant WBA title, in Buenos Aires.

== 1975 ==
- March 2 – Roberto Durán defeats Ray Lampkin to retain the WBA and The Ring lightweight titles.
- March 24 – The fight that inspired the movie Rocky: With a young Sylvester Stallone sitting at home and watching, Muhammad Ali retains his world Heavyweight championship with a fifteenth-round knockout over underdog Chuck Wepner, but not without suffering a ninth round knockdown first, in Cleveland.
- March 30 – José Nápoles retains his world Welterweight title with a highly controversial and suspicious twelve round technical decision over Armando Muniz in Acapulco, Mexico. Although no one knew for sure when Nápoles' facial cuts (which caused the fight to be stopped) happened, it was decided that they were probably the result of a headbutt in round three. Therefore, instead of giving the world title to Muniz by technical knockout, it was decided to check the judge's scorecards, and Nápoles was ahead on points, making him the winner by technical decision.
- April 26 – George Foreman stages a boxing exhibition against five different boxers, including former Joe Frazier challenger Terry Daniels. He beats the five men by knockout in Toronto, Ontario, Canada.
- May 16 – Muhammad Ali retains the world Heavyweight title with an eleventh-round knockout of Ron Lyle in Las Vegas.
- May 17 – Antonio Cervantes retains his World Boxing Association (WBA) world Jr. Welterweight title with a fifteen-round decision over Esteban De Jesús in Panama City, Panama.
- June 20 – Rubén Olivares wins the World Boxing Council (WBC) world Featherweight title, knocking out Bobby Chacon in the second round of their second of three fights, in Inglewood.
- June 28 – Ángel Espada wins the vacant WBA world Welterweight title that had been stripped from José Nápoles after Nápoles refused to fight him, by beating Clyde Gray with a fifteen-round decision in San Juan, Puerto Rico.
- June 30 – Muhammad Ali retains his world Heavyweight title with a fifteen-round unanimous decision over Joe Bugner in Kuala Lumpur, Malaysia.
- July 12 – José Nápoles retains his world Welterweight title with a fifteen-round decision over Armando Muniz in their Mexico City, Mexico rematch.
- July 15 – With only two previous professional bouts, Thailand's Saensak Muangsuring makes history by winning the WBC world Jr. Welterweight title, knocking out world champion Jose Fernandez in Bangkok. Muangsuring becomes the fastest boxer to reach a world championship after his debut.
- August 23 – The first world Junior Flyweight world championship fight sees Jaime Rios beat Rigoberto Marcano by decision in fifteen rounds at Panama City to become the WBA's world champion.
- September 20 – David Kotey becomes Ghana's first world champion, defeating Rubén Olivares by a fifteen-round decision to win the WBC's world Featherweight championship in Inglewood.
- September 30 – The Thrilla in Manila: Muhammad Ali retains his world Heavyweight title in his third fight with Joe Frazier, by TKO in round fourteen in Manila. Ali compared this bout to being next to death.
- December 6 – José Nápoles' last fight, as he loses his WBC world Welterweight title to John H. Stracey in Mexico City, Mexico.
- December 7 – Bobby Chacon defeats Rafael Limón by unanimous decision

== 1976 ==
- January 24 – George Foreman recovers from two four round knockdowns and beats Ron Lyle by a knockout in the fifth round at Las Vegas. Lyle had also suffered a knockdown in round four, which was picked round of the year by The Ring, publication that also selected the fight as fight of the year. Also, it was the first major boxing fight at the Caesars Palace hotel and casino, which would become known as the "Home of Champions".
- February 20 – Muhammad Ali defeats Jean-Pierre Coopman by 5th-round KO to retain undisputed heavyweight championship
- March 17 – Wilfred Benítez becomes, at age 17, the youngest world champion in boxing history and wins his first of three world titles, defeating WBA world Jr. Welterweight champion Antonio Cervantes by a fifteen-round split decision in San Juan, Puerto Rico.
- April 3 – The first Jr. Featherweight world title bout in history, as Rigoberto Riasco knocks out Wainunge Wakayama in ten rounds at Panama City, Panama to win the WBC vacant title.
- April 30 – Muhammad Ali retains the world Heavyweight title with a highly disputed fifteen round unanimous decision over Jimmy Young at Capital Centre in Landover, Maryland.
- May 24 – Muhammad Ali knocks out Richard Dunn in 5 rounds to retain his undisputed heavyweight championship. For Ali, it was his 37th and final knockout of his Hall of Fame career.
- June 15 – George Foreman defeats Joe Frazier by 5th-round TKO in their rematch.
- June 26 – Carlos Monzón re-unifies his WBA world Middleweight title with the WBC one by defeating WBC champion Rodrigo Valdez with a fifteen-round unanimous decision at Monte Carlo, Monaco. (The WBC had stripped Monzon in 1974 for failing to defend the title against Valdez)
- September 28 – In the last chapter of their trilogy, Muhammad Ali retains the world Heavyweight championship with a disputed fifteen round unanimous decision over Ken Norton, at New York City's Yankee Stadium.

== 1977 ==
- January 16 – In front of an ABC National Television audience, future Boxing Hall of Famer Larry Holmes defeated Tom Prater in an 8-round unanimous decision on board the USS Lexington in Pensacola, Florida.
- March 17 – Jimmy Young defeats George Foreman by a twelve-round unanimous decision at the Roberto Clemente Coliseum, San Juan, Puerto Rico. Yet Ali still refused to give Young a title fight rematch. Immediately after the fight, Foreman has a religious experience, becomes a new-born Christian and retires from boxing.
- April 23 – In a fight without any titles at stake, WBC world Bantamweight champion Carlos Zarate defeats WBA world champion Alfonso Zamora in four rounds at Inglewood.
- May 11 – Ken Norton knocks out former Olympian Duane Bobick in the first round at the Madison Square Garden, New York City.
- May 16 – Muhammad Ali defeats Alfredo Evangelista by unanimous decision.
- May 21 – Wilfredo Gómez wins the first of three world titles by knocking out WBC world Jr. Featherweight champion Dong Kyun Yum in twelve rounds at San Juan.
- July 30 – Carlos Monzón recovers from a second round knockdown and retains his world Middleweight championship with a fifteen-round unanimous decision against Rodrigo Valdez in their rematch, at Monte Carlo, Monaco. Monzon broke the all-time record of defenses at the Middleweight division with fourteen successful defenses, and he retired permanently after this fight.
- September 29 – Muhammad Ali retains the undisputed heavyweight championship with a fifteen-round unanimous decision over Earnie Shavers in New York.
- November 5 – Rodrigo Valdez wins the undisputed world middleweight championship left vacant by archrival Carlos Monzón, outpointing Bennie Briscoe by unanimity after fifteen rounds in Campioni d' Italia, Italy.

== 1978 ==
- January 21 – Roberto Durán vs. Esteban de Jesús III : The third and final chapter of the Duran-De Jesus trilogy, as Roberto Durán re-unifies his WBA world Lightweight championship with the WBC one, defeating Esteban De Jesús by a knockout in round twelve at Las Vegas. Duran had been stripped of his WBC belt for failing to meet Ishimatzu Suzuki in a world championship bout, Suzuki later won the WBC title and lost it to De Jesus.
- January 28 – Alexis Argüello wins the second of three world titles, knocking out WBC world Jr. Lightweight champion Alfredo Escalera in thirteen rounds at The Bloody Battle of Bayamon in Bayamón, Puerto Rico.
- February 15 – Leon Spinks, a novice who had had only had seven professional fights, wins the undisputed world Heavyweight championship, defeating Muhammad Ali by a fifteen-round split decision, in Las Vegas.
- March 18 – Recognition of World Heavyweight Champion Leon Spinks is withdrawn by the World Boxing Council after Spinks elected to fight Muhammad Ali in a rematch rather than face the organization's #1 contender, Ken Norton. In an unprecedented step, the WBC immediately announces its recognition of Norton as champion, and orders him to fight the highest ranked contender available (Larry Holmes) not later than June 17.
- March 25 – Larry Holmes earned his spot for the heavyweight title by beating Earnie Shavers in a twelve-round unanimous decision in front of a national ABC television audience in Las Vegas.
- April 15 – Eusebio Pedroza begins his record-setting championship run as WBA world Featherweight champion, knocking out Cecilio Lastra in thirteen rounds at Panama City, Panama.
- May 20 – José Cuevas retains his WBA world welterweight title with a first-round knockout of former world champion Billy Backus in Inglewood.
- June 9 – Larry Holmes becomes the WBC's fourth World Heavyweight champion in precisely four months (after Muhammad Ali, Leon Spinks and Ken Norton) by defeating Ken Norton by a fifteen-round split decision.
- September 15 – Muhammad Ali makes history, becoming the first boxer to be world Heavyweight champion three times, by beating novice Leon Spinks by a fifteen-round unanimous decision at their New Orleans rematch.
- October 28 – In an eagerly anticipated bout, Wilfredo Gómez delivers what many consider the greatest victory ever by a Puerto Rican boxer, knocking out Carlos Zarate in five rounds to retain the WBC world Super Bantamweight title, San Juan, Puerto Rico.
- November 10 – Larry Holmes retains his WBC world Heavyweight title with a seventh-round knockout over Uruguayan Alfredo Evangelista, in Las Vegas.

== 1979 ==
- January 14 – Wilfred Benítez wins his second of three world titles, defeating WBC world Welterweight champion Carlos Palomino by a fifteen-round split decision in San Juan, Puerto Rico.
- February 4 – The rematch between Alexis Argüello and Alfredo Escalera has exactly the first result as their first bout, when Arguello retains his WBC world Jr. Lightweight title with a knockout in round thirteen at Rimini, Italy. Both fights were picked by The Ring among the 100 greatest fights of all times in 1994.
- March 14 – Larry Holmes retains his WBC world Heavyweight title with a seventh-round knockout of future WBA world Cruiserweight champion Ossie Ocasio in Las Vegas.
- April 4 – The rematch between Rafael Limón and Bobby Chacon ends in a technical draw
- April 14 – Victor Galindez regains the WBA world Light Heavyweight championship with a tenth-round knockout of his former conqueror, Mike Rossman, in New Orleans.
- April 22 – Matthew Saad Muhammad wins the WBC world Light Heavyweight title with an eighth-round knockout of WBC world champion Marvin Johnson in Indianapolis.
- June 3 – Lupe Pintor survives a knockdown to win the WBC world Bantamweight title, defeating Carlos Zarate by a fifteen-round split decision at Las Vegas.
- June 17 – In Ring Magazine's fight of the year, Danny Lopez retains his WBC world Featherweight title by knocking out Mike Ayala in round fifteen at San Antonio. Ayala later admitted to being high on drugs during the fight.
- June 22 – Roberto Durán beats Carlos Palomino by a ten-round unanimous decision in Palomino's last fight for the next eighteen years, and Larry Holmes retains his WBC world Heavyweight title with a twelfth-round knockout of Mike Weaver at the Madison Square Garden, New York City.
- August 12 – Ray Leonard defeats Pete Ranzany by 4th-round TKO
- September 28 – Larry Holmes recovers from a seventh round knockdown to defeat perennial challenger Earnie Shavers by an eleventh-round knockout to retain his WBC world Heavyweight title at Las Vegas. Wilfredo Gómez retains his WBC world Super Bantamweight title with a tenth-round knockout win over Carlos Mendoza in the same undercard.
- October 20 – John Tate defeats Gerrie Coetzee by a fifteen-round unanimous decision to win the WBA world Heavyweight title that had been vacated by Muhammad Ali, Pretoria.
- November 30 – A preview of things to come, as Sugar Ray Leonard wins his first of five world titles by knocking out Wilfred Benítez in round fifteen for the WBC world Welterweight title and Marvin Hagler draws in fifteen round with undisputed world Middleweight champion Vito Antuofermo in Las Vegas.
