= Viruet =

Viruet is a surname. Notable people with the surname include:

- Adolfo Viruet (born 1952), Puerto Rican boxer
- Edwin Viruet (born 1950), Puerto Rican boxer
