= Vilomar Fernandez =

Boxer from the Dominican Republic

Vilomar Fernandez (born August 12, 1952 in Santo Domingo, Dominican Republic) is a Dominican Republic former professional boxer who twice challenged for the world Lightweight championship. Known as a very capable, defensive-minded fighter, Fernandez is mostly known for his victory over International Boxing Hall of Fame member Alexis Arguello, in a contest that took place on July 26, 1978, and which was scored as a ten-rounds decision win for Fernandez.

== Early boxing career ==
Fernandez was a top amateur boxer in the United States. In 1970, when Fernandez was 18 years old, he and his brother, José, who was another top amateur competitor and who fought for a world title as a professional himself, reached the finals of the New York Golden Gloves competition at the 126 pounds division's open division tournament. Since the Golden Gloves rules prohibited brothers from fighting each other, the Fernandez brothers were declared co-champions.

Early in his career, Fernandez was trained and managed by New York boxing trainer Pedro “Pete” Miranda, who worked with him during his rise in the lightweight division in the 1970s. Miranda was present in Fernandez’s corner during several of his notable fights, including the period surrounding his 1978 upset victory over Alexis Argüello. Miranda was quoted in both Sports Illustrated and The New York Times discussing Fernandez’s career and the difficulty of securing fights for him despite his status as a top lightweight contender.

Gammon, Clive. "Beating a Triumphant Retreat." Sports Illustrated, Aug. 7, 1978.

Katz, Michael. "Getting Himself a Fight; A Man to Be Avoided." The New York Times, Feb. 23, 1980.

== Professional boxing career ==
On May 24, 1971, the still 18 years old Fernandez made his professional boxing debut, facing the also debuting, Salvador Ramirez. This contest took place at the Felt Forum in New York city, and Fernandez won by a second-round technical knockout. During the early stage of his professional career Fernandez was trained and managed by Bronx-based boxing trainer Pedro “Pete” Miranda, a Puerto Rican-born figure active in the New York boxing scene who had worked with Fernandez since his teenage amateur years and helped guide him through the early stages of his professional career.

Fernandez won his first four bouts before meeting the debuting Dave Smith on Thursday, January 13, 1972, at the Sunnyside Garden in Sunnyside, Queens, New York, as part of a program headlined by his brother José versus Marion Thomas. Somewhat surprisingly, Fernandez lost his condition as an undefeated boxer when knocked out by Smith in round three of a scheduled 4 rounds contest. The loss at the hands of Smith was followed by three wins against the same opponent, José Resto, who was defeated by six rounds decision on March 1, 1972, at the Sunnyside Garden, by another six rounds decision at the Felt Forum on April 17 of that year and by yet another six rounds decision, on April 28, also in 1972 at the Sunnyside Garden, as part of another program headlined by his brother, José.

Counting the three wins over Resto, Fernandez built a nine-fight winning streak. Three of those wins were by knockout. Included in that streak was a win over Puerto Rican Gregorio Benitez (brother of International Boxing Hall of Fame member Wilfred Benitez), a 7 wins, 1 loss prospect, by a six rounds unanimous decision on Friday, November 17, 1972, at the Madison Square Garden in New York, as part of a show that had Esteban De Jesus beat world Lightweight champion Roberto Duran in a non-title main event.

That early, nine fight win streak was interrupted when the 7 wins, 2 losses prospect Eduardo Santiago met Fernandez on February 23, 1973, at the Sunnyside Garden. The pair fought to a ten rounds draw (tie) that afternoon, but, exactly six months later, on July 23, the two had a rematch as the headliner bout of a show at the Felt Forum, with Fernandez the winner by a close but clear unanimous decision victory, two judges giving him the fight by a 7–3 rounds margin and the third one by 6–4. A series of consecutive setbacks followed the second fight with Eduardo Santiago, as Fernandez then lost three contests in a row: to 22 wins, 3 losses and 3 draws Walter Seeley by 10 rounds unanimous decision on October 23, 1973, to Puerto Rican contender, 17 wins, 1 loss and 2 draws Edwin Viruet on March 8, 1974, at the Madison Square Garden, and to fellow Dominican, Ezequiel "Cocoa" Sánchez by decision in 12 rounds on June 15, 1974, in what constituted Fernandez's first contest at his home-country as the bout was held in the Dominican Republic's capital city of Santo Domingo.

Following those three losses, Fernandez had a record of 14 wins, 4 losses and 1 draw, with 4 wins by knockout.

Fernandez rebounded from those three losses by defeating the veteran Puerto Rican contender Frankie Otero, 43 wins, 6 losses and 2 draws coming in, twice in a row: first on Tuesday, January 7, 1975, at the Auditorium, Miami Beach, Florida, by a ten rounds unanimous decision, and then on Tuesday, February 11 of the same year at the same place, also by ten rounds decision, albeit this time by a majority one and in the main event of the boxing show that night.

Fernandez then met Antonio Amaya, a former world title challenger from Panama who had 45 wins, 12 losses and 4 ties when the pair met at Santo Domingo on Monday, April 28, 1975, with Fernandez imposing himself by a ten rounds unanimous decision. The win against Amaya and his two next wins, against previously undefeated Ray Lunny III (22-0-3), whom Fernandez dropped in round nine en route to a twelve rounds unanimous decision at the Cow Palace in Daly City, California on Friday, August 22, 1975 and against Ray Lampkin (32-4-1), whom Fernandez dropped in round one and who was defeated by the Dominican by ten rounds unanimous decision on a program headlined by a Saoul Mamby fight on February 6, 1976, at the Madison Square Garden in New York, allowed Fernandez to be ranked and qualify for a world championship fight for the first time in his career, despite a setback in his next contest, when he was outpointed on June 15 at the Nassau Coliseum in Nassau, New York by then-undefeated Vicente Mijares (10–0) as part of a program headlined by George Foreman's second win over Joe Frazier. Fernandez had a knockdown called against him in round four of the Mijares contest.

=== First world title challenge ===
Fernandez fought Roberto Duran, widely considered one of the best boxers in history by experts and other boxers such as International Boxing Hall of Fame member Barry McGuigan, for Duran's World Boxing Association's world Lightweight title on Saturday, January 29, 1977, at the Fontainebleau Hotel in Miami Beach, Florida. Duran was 58–1, with 49 wins by knockout coming in. Fernandez put serious resistance but was down by a considerable margin on the scorecards when Duran was finally able to stop him at 2 minutes and sixteen seconds of round thirteen to retain the championship. Duran-Fernandez was televised nationally in the United States by the CBS channel network.

The Duran-Fernandez match featured a bizarre incident or blooper, when the fight's announcer asked the crowd present to stand up and face the American flag for the playing of the national anthems of Panama, the Dominican Republic and the United States, but there was no flag present and no singers to sing the anthems. Boxer Jerry Quarry, who was attending to cover the fight for CBS, stood up and sang the American anthem instead.

=== First fight with Alexis Arguello ===
The loss to Duran was followed by Fernandez with three wins in a row against more or less obscure opponents with combined records of 18 wins, 38 losses and 2 draws, then a draw against 16-6-2 Larry Stanton (in a contest scored by Sam Irom for Fernandez 5-4 but as a 5–5 tie by Joe Santarpia and 6-4 for Stanton by Harold Lederman) as part of a March 2, 1978, program at the Felt Forum which was headlined by a bout between Mike Rossman and Yaqui Lopez, and then, Fernandez faced another all-time great in former WBA world Featherweight and then current WBC world Junior Lightweight champion, Nicaragua's Alexis Arguello, who was actively seeking a third divisional world title in the Lightweight division. Arguello-Fernandez I came on at the Madison Square Garden in New York on Wednesday, July 26, 1978, and Fernandez caused an upset when he outpointed the world Junior Lightweight champion, winning the non-title Lightweight division affair by a ten rounds majority decision, with judge Irom scoring it 6–4 and judge Artie Aidala 5-4 in rounds in favor of Fernandez and referee and judge Arthur Mercante Sr. having it a 5–5 tie. Fernandez's trainer and manager Pedro “Pete” Miranda later commented on the difficulty of arranging fights for Fernandez despite his contender status following the victory.

=== Second fight with Alexis Arguello ===
The usually durable Fernandez then faced Mexican boxer Rodolfo González, losing by second round knockout. The fight with the undefeated Gonzalez (16-0-1) was held at the Forum in Inglewood, California on March 16, 1981.

Fernandez took the rest of 1981 off, then went up in division to the Junior Welterweight one, debuting there in 1982 with three wins in a row over mostly obscure opposition as the three fighters he faced that year had a combined record of 14-8.

Things away from Fernandez took place that made a second fight with Arguello a viable one: Arguello had lost to Aaron Pryor on November 12 of 1982, but that fight was tainted by a controversy afterwards concerning a bottle given to Pryor between rounds that energized him after he was in trouble during parts of the fight. An investigation was launched by the WBA as to the contents of that bottle. Meanwhile, Arguello remained a viable contender for Pryor's belt, and so a series of fights were programmed for him while the WBA investigation took place. One of those was a rematch with Fernandez, which took place on Saturday, February 26, 1983 at the Freeman Coliseum in San Antonio, Texas. Arguello had 72 wins and 6 losses by this time. Fernandez was floored in round four and lost by unanimous decision, with a decisive disadvantage on the scorecards, as he was deemed a loser by scores of 98-92 twice and of 100-91. Arguello-Fernandez II was televised nationwide in the United States and to Puerto Rico.

=== Rest of career ===
On his next fight, October 25 of 1983, Fernandez scored a rare knockout victory, in the second round, over former WBC world Junior Welterweight championship challenger, the 50 wins, 7 losses and 3 draws (34 wins by knockout), Monroe Brooks, at the Memorial Auditorium in Sacramento, California, sending Brooks into retirement. This contest had been scheduled for ten rounds.

Victories over Angel Cruz and prospect (24-3-4) Billy Parks followed but on Friday, June 28, 1985, Fernandez lost to 13-1 prospect Ricky Young, at the Felt Forum, in what constituted Fernandez's last contest as a professional boxer.

== See also ==
- List of people from the Dominican Republic
