= Roberto Durán vs. Esteban de Jesús =

Boxing match

- Date: November 17, 1972
- Venue: Madison Square Garden, New York City, New York, U.S.

Tale of the tape
Boxer	Roberto Durán	Esteban de Jesús
Nickname	Manos de Piedra ("Hands of Stone")	Vita
Hometown	Panama City, Panama	Carolina, Puerto Rico
Pre-fight record	31–0 (26 KO)	32–1 (19 KO)
Age	21 years, 5 months	22 years, 3 months
Height	5 ft 7 1/2 in (171 cm)	5 ft 4 1/2 in (164 cm)
Weight	137 1/2 lb (62 kg)	138 lb (63 kg)
Style	Orthodox	Orthodox
Recognition	WBA and The Ring; Lightweight Champion	WBA; No. 3 Ranked Lightweight

Result
- de Jesús wins via UD (6–3, 6–2, 5–4)

Roberto Durán vs. Esteban de Jesús was a professional boxing match contested on November 17, 1972. The fight was the first in the famed Durán–de Jesús trilogy of the 1970s. Though Durán held both the WBA and The Ring lightweight titles, neither was on the line.

== Background ==
Five months prior, undefeated Roberto Durán had defeated reigning WBA lightweight champion Ken Buchanan to claim the title for himself. Durán would then take on two unheralded journeymen in Greg Potter and Lupe Ramirez, knocking out both inside of the first round. Original plans called for Durán to face Buchanan in a championship rematch on October 20 in Madison Square Garden, but Durán broke the agreement. Instead, on November 1, Durán agreed to face top ranked lightweight contender Esteban de Jesús in a non-title bout on November 17.

Though de Jesús was ranked as the number-three lightweight in the world, Durán's WBA and The Ring lightweight titles were not on the line as Durán claimed that the Military Leader of Panama Omar Torrijos had forbidden him from making his first defense outside of Panama, which was scheduled to take place the following January. Unbothered by being denied a shot at the title, de Jesús stated "When I knock him out, they'll have to give me a title fight. It doesn't make any difference, I'll get him sooner or later." As Durán's lightweight title was not on the line, both fighters fought above the 135-pound lightweight limit at 138 pounds.

== The fight ==
In the first round, de Jesús landed a left hook to Durán's chin that dropped Durán to the mat for the first time in his career. From there on, de Jesús thoroughly outboxed Durán, constantly landing punches from long range and frustrating the usually aggressive Durán, who was warned twice in the fifth round for hitting after a break and a low-blow. The fight would go the full 10-round distance with de Jesús being awarded a unanimous decision victory with scores of 6–3 (one round even) 6–2 (two rounds even) and 5–4 (one round even).

== Aftermath ==
This was Durán's first professional loss but the non-title bout was fought at 138lb rather than the 135lb lightweight limit.

== Fight card ==
Confirmed bouts:

Weight Class	Weight		vs.		Method	Round	Notes
Catchweight	138 lbs.	Esteban de Jesús	def.	Roberto Durán	UD	10/10
Lightwight	135 lbs.	Vilomar Fernandez	def.	Gregorio Benitez	UD	6/6
Super Lightweight	140 lbs.	Richie Villanueva	def.	Enrique Piton	TKO	3/6
Lightweight	135 lbs.	Jerome Artis	def.	Hector Diaz	PTS	4/4
Super Lightweight	140 lbs.	Carlos Gonzalez	def.	Bernard Almonte	PTS	4/4

Preceded by vs. Lupe Ramirez	Roberto Durán's bouts 17 November 1972	Succeeded by vs. Jimmy Robertson
Preceded by vs. Doc McClendon	Esteban de Jesús's bouts 17 November 1972	Succeeded by vs. Ray Lampkin
Awards
Preceded by Hiroshi Kobayashi vs. Alfredo Marcano	The Ring Upset of the Year; 1972	Succeeded by Muhammad Ali vs. Ken Norton
