= Roberto Durán vs. Esteban de Jesús III =

Boxing match

The Combat Zone
- Date: January 21, 1978
- Venue: Caesars Palace, Paradise, Nevada, U.S.
- Title(s) on the line: WBA, WBC and The Ring undisputed lightweight titles

Tale of the tape
Boxer	Roberto Durán	Esteban de Jesús
Nickname	Manos de Piedra ("Hands of Stone")	Vita
Hometown	Panama City, Panama	Carolina, Puerto Rico
Purse	$250,000	$150,000
Pre-fight record	62–1 (53 KO)	51–3 (29 KO)
Age	26 years, 7 months	27 years, 5 months
Height	5 ft 7 1/2 in (171 cm)	5 ft 4 1/2 in (164 cm)
Weight	134 1/4 lb (61 kg)	134 lb (61 kg)
Style	Orthodox	Orthodox
Recognition	WBA and The Ring; Lightweight Champion	WBC; Lightweight Champion; The Ring; No. 1 Ranked Lightweight

Result
- Durán wins via 12th-round technical knockout

Roberto Durán vs. Esteban de Jesús III, billed as The Combat Zone, was a professional boxing match contested on January 21, 1978, for the WBA, WBC and The Ring lightweight titles.

== Background ==
In November 1972, top contender Esteban de Jesús defeated reigning WBA lightweight champion Roberto Durán, becoming the first fighter to both defeat and earn a knockdown against Durán. 15 months later, the two men would have a rematch in Durán's native Panama, this time with Durán's titles on the line. Though de Jesús again scored an opening round knockdown, Durán rebounded to knockout de Jesús in the 11th round.

Durán would go on to successfully defend his titles seven times, while in 1976, de Jesús would claim the WBC version of the lightweight title after outpointing champion Guts Ishimatsu in his native Puerto Rico and then successfully defending his title three times. This would finally lead to a third fight between the fighters with the winner to be recognized as the undisputed lightweight champion. The fight, which was announced in December 1977 to take place on January 14, was moved back a week by promoter Don King so Durán would have more time to get in better condition.

At the pre-fight weigh-in a melee broke out after de Jesús struck Durán with a right hand, though the two men were separated before anyone could be seriously hurt. Durán expressed his dislike of de Jesús in large part due to his victory over him stating "I don't like him for a lot of reasons, mostly because he is the only man ever to beat me. And he is the only man to ever knock me down. I don't like him for those reasons, but I have to respect him for them." de Jesús responded "If he don't like me because I knock him down, let him wait until after this fight, this time I'm going to destroy him. When I knock him down this time, if he gets up, I will kill him. I tell him that I will fight him in the street anytime for nothing. He ignored me. For this I am glad, because I need the money." Duran was a 2-1 favorite.

== The fight ==
Durán finally avoided being knocked down in the first round and used his jab and constant pressure to build up a lead on the judge's scorecards though de Jesús did manage to keep the fight fairly close. With de Jesús tiring, Durán countered a left hook with a short right hand that dropped de Jesús to the canvas. Though de Jesús struggled he was able to beat the referee's 10-count but was met with a barrage from Durán, before the referee could signal another knockdown, de Jesús co-trainer Manny Siaca entered the ring to prevent any more punishment, causing the referee to stop the fight and award Durán the victory by technical knockout.

== Aftermath ==
This was Duran's last fight as a lightweight, he would vacate the championship in February to pursue a title at welterweight.

== Fight card ==
Confirmed bouts:

Weight Class	Weight		vs.		Method	Round	Notes
Lightweight	135 lbs.	Roberto Durán	def.	Esteban de Jesús	TKO	12/15	^{Note 1}
Middleweight	160 lbs.	Mustafa Hamsho	def.	Rocky Mosley Jr.	UD	10/10
Middleweight	160 lbs.	Rocky Mattioli	def.	Jose Rodriguez	UD	10/10
Heavyweight	200+ lbs.	Kevin Isaac	def.	Joe Alexander	UD	10/10

^Note 1 For WBA, WBC and The Ring Lightweight titles

== Broadcasting ==
Country	Broadcaster
Mexico	Televisa
Philippines	RPN 9
United Kingdom	ITV
United States	CBS

Preceded by vs. Edwin Viruet	Roberto Durán's bouts 21 January 1978	Succeeded by vs. Adolfo Viruet
Preceded by vs. James Brackett	Esteban de Jesús's bouts 21 January 1978	Succeeded by vs. Pablo Baez
