= Josue Marquez =

Puerto Rican boxer (1946–2018)

Josue Marquez Acevedo (November 30, 1946, Hato Rey, Puerto Rico – May 10, 2018, Caguas, Puerto Rico) was a Puerto Rican who was once a world title challenging boxer. Not known for his punching power, (Marquez only won 7 of his 46 professional boxing fights by knockout), Marquez nevertheless gave many of the top boxers of his era trouble and managed to defeat a number of them.

== Amateur boxing career ==
Marquez had an excelling amateur boxing career, which led him to participate at the 1965 Central American and Caribbean Games, held in San Juan and where he boxed all the way to the medals round but was disqualified from further participation because he had problems making the weight for a fight. He was the national amateur Bantamweight champion in Puerto Rico that year, his amateur career culminating in his winning the international Bantamweight championship as well as the United States' national AAU Bantamweight championship early in 1966, months before he started boxing as a professional.

== Professional boxing career ==
Marquez began to box professionally on August 20, 1966, when he beat Alberto Jorge, who was also making his debut, by a four round decision at the Hiram Bithorn Stadium in San Juan. This was followed by a victory over future Juan Laporte trainer, Carlos Espada (brother of Angel Espada) on October 1. Espada was also making his debut.

Marquez's next bout was against Carlos' brother, the future WBA world welterweight champion Angel Espada. Espada was also a debutant. On February 11, 1967, Marquez outpointed the future world champion over six rounds, winning by decision. On March 23, he fought Richard Alexander and won by four round split decision, also in what was his first fight abroad, fought at the Convention Center in Louisville, Kentucky, United States. A rematch with Alberto Jorge followed on April 5 at San Juan and he again beat Jorge by four rounds decision.

Only three days after his rematch with Jorge, Marquez followed by fighting the far more experienced, 10-5-5 Jose Colon, at the Cancha Pepin Cestero in the northern Puerto Rican city of Bayamon. On April 8, 1967, Marquez defeated Colon by six round decision, then on May 5, he boxed Ernesto Ortega at the Hiram Bithorn Stadium, suffering a mild upset defeat when Ortega, 3-2 coming in, outpointed Marquez over six rounds. The loss was followed by a fight against debuting "Indio" Macias on September 16, in which Marquez scored his first knockout win as a professional, defeating Macias by knockout in round three.

On October 20, 1967, Marquez and Carlos Espada fought a rematch; this time around, Marquez repeated his four round points victory over Espada, and then, on March 15, 1968, Marquez made his New York City debut, fighting fellow Puerto Rican Angel Torres, a respected prospect who had won nine bouts and lost one prior to Marquez fighting him. This bout took place at the National Maritime Union Hall and Marquez prevailed by eight round decision.

Josue Marquez and Jose Colon fought a rematch on April 29, 1968, at the Hiram Bithorn Stadium in San Juan. By this time, Colon's record was 11 wins, 11 losses and 6 draws. Marquez scored his second career knockout win when he beat a shopworn Colon in the second round, and then traveled to Santo Domingo, Dominican Republic to fight debuting Jose Anglada on June 29, defeating Anglada by a six round decision. Another rematch followed that win, this time against Angel Torres, by then 9-2. On August 15 at San Juan, Marquez once again beat Torres, by eight rounds decision.

Marquez had a lay-off of almost one year after the Torres rematch, but he returned with a win, on July 5, 1969, over previously undefeated (6-0-1) Joe Cartwright by a fifth round technical knockout in San Juan. Keeping a busy schedule, Marquez faced Eddie Linder, a fighter with a 25-4-6 record, on August 9, barely one month and four days after the Cartwright knockout. Marquez won by eight rounds decision and twenty one days later saw off the challenge of Benny Huertas (who would famously oppose Roberto Durán in Durán's Madison Square Garden debut two years later) on August 30, outpointing the 11-9-3 fighter over eight rounds in San Juan.

On October 11 of that year (1969), he faced Bobo Akerson of the Bronx, New York., stopping the 8-4 contender in round eight at San Juan. On November 1, he stopped Jorge Nogueras in three rounds at San Juan. This fight was a mismatch; Nogueras was 0-1 coming in. A far more experienced boxer, Jerry Graci, awaited Marquez in his next fight; Graci was 16-15-5 in 36 professional contests when he and Marquez duly met on December 6 at San Juan. Marquez closed out his 1969 campaign with a ten rounds points victory over Graci in San Juan.

On January 10, 1970, Marquez traded gloves with Bobby Joe Hughes, a 9 win, 11 loss trial horse, and he defeated Hughes by ten round decision in San Juan. On March 14, he faced Marcus Anderson, who was 17-1, also at San Juan. Marquez won this fight by seventh round knockout, and then in April, Marquez traveled to Italy to take on 19-7-6 Giampero Salami on April 18, at Cremona, Lombardia. Marquez lost this bout for his second loss as a professional, by eight round decision.

Having returned from Italy to Puerto Rico, Marquez boxed Rocky Orengo only 12 days after the Salami bout, on April 30, 1970. Orengo was 7-9-2 coming into their bout, held at San Juan. Marquez defeated Orengo by ten round decision.

=== Fight with Miguel Velazquez ===
Miguel Velazquez is a Spaniard who by 1970 was world-ranked, with a record of 40-1-1. Velazquez had just won the vacant European Lightweight title with a 15 round decision over future world Lightweight champion and International Boxing Hall of Fame member, Ken Buchanan.

When Marquez and Velazquez met, May 22, 1970 at Madrid, Spain's Palacio de los Deportes, they fought for a better world ranking among the top ten Junior Welterweights of the time, Marquez weighing 136 and a half pounds and Velazquez 138, one and a half and three pounds over the Lightweight division's weight limit, respectively, but also 3 and a half and 2 pounds under the Junior Welterweight division's weight limit. Despite putting much resistance, Marquez dropped a ten round decision to Velazquez.

Velazquez later became a world champion, winning and losing the World Boxing Council's world Junior Welterweight championship against Thailand's Saensak Muangsurin.

Immediately following the fight with Velazquez, Marquez returned to Italy for a rematch against Giampiero Salami, on June 26 at Ancona. Once again, however, he lost to Salami, this time outpointed over eight rounds. Three months later, Marquez returned to the boxing ring, facing fellow Puerto Rican contender Hector Matta, who was 9-3. On September 26 at the Hiram Bithorn Stadium, Marquez obtained a ten round decision win over Matta. Marquez did not fight again for the rest of 1970, taking seven months and a half to return to the ring, to fight Carlos Penzo in San Juan. This fight was also a mismatch, as Penzo had only fought once, losing that fight. Marquez beat Penzo by ten round decision May 15, 1971.

=== Puerto Rican Lightweight championship ===
After the Penzo bout, Marquez was allowed to challenge for the vacant Puerto Rican national Lightweight championship. His rival, Victor Ortiz (not to be confused with the latter world champion boxer and actor of the same name) was 11-2, when he and Marquez faced off on June 20, 1971 in San Juan. Marquez won the Puerto Rican Lightweight title when he outpointed Ortiz over twelve rounds, giving Marquez his first professional championship.

Ortiz would go on to become the 5th ranked Junior Welterweight in the world by the WBA and challenge Antonio Cervantes unsuccessfully for his world title.

=== Esteban De Jesus ===
On his next fight, Marquez would face his biggest test until that time, up and coming Puerto Rican prospect and future WBC Lightweight champion of the world, Esteban De Jesus, who was undefeated and untied in 20 bouts. De Jesus was a rising star in Puerto Rico, the rest of Latin America and the United States when he and Marquez first boxed each other, on July 24, only a month and four days after Marquez had won the national championship.

In a twelve round fight, De Jesus took the title away from Marquez, winning by a points decision.

The two had a rematch on September 4, once again in San Juan. De Jesus was again deemed winner on points after twelve rounds to retain the national Lightweight title.

Marquez followed those two confrontations with a draw against George Foster, who was 13-5 before their December 3 bout at the Felt Forum in New York, and a split decision win on January 21, 1972 against well regarded trial-horse Doc McClendon, 8-7-1, also at the Felt Forum, before challenging De Jesus for a second time; their third bout overall, with De Jesus' Puerto Rican national title on the line was fought not in Puerto Rico, but at the Felt Forum in New York City, on May 21 of 1972. Once again, Marquez was defeated by De Jesus, this time by a twelfth round knockout. The referee for the third De Jesus-Marquez bout was Arthur Mercante Sr.

Marquez then met a debutant boxer, Radames Checo, in a mismatch held on July 28 at Caguas, Puerto Rico. Marquez beat Checo by ten round unanimous decision, and Checo would go on to lose all fourteen of his professional boxing bouts.

=== World title challenge ===
On February 15, 1973, Marquez challenged Colombian Antonio Cervantes for his World Boxing Association Junior Welterweight championship of the world. Held at the Roberto Clemente Coliseum in San Juan, this was the first world title fight staged at that venue. Cervantes is a relatively tall man with long arms, but Marquez gave him a close fight for fifteen rounds before the world champion was deemed victor and retainer of his world crown by a split decision. According to boxing magazine The Ring, Marquez landed a short left hook in round three that dropped the champion, but the fall was scored a slip by the referee, Venezuela's Juan Carlos Tapia. In round fifteen, Cervantes dropped Marquez. Nine thousand people attended the bout, most of whom felt that Cervantes was the correct winner. Ring Magazine saw the bout at 147-141 for the Colombian champion.

Marquez's father died later on the day after his challenge with Cervantes was finished; having watched the bout in person, he (Marquez's father) suffered a heart attack and died shortly after.

=== Rest of professional career ===
Six months after his world title challenge of Cervantes, Marquez was back in the ring, facing 3-2 Ronald Whyms, whom Marquez outpointed over ten rounds at San Juan on August 21.

Then came a trip to Australia to meet Hector Thompson, 41-3-2, on November 5 at the Brisbane Festival Hall in Brisbane. Marquez lost that fight by ten round decision, but returned to the winning column by defeating super-veteran Angel Robinson Garcia, by then 128-65-19, also by ten round decision, back home in San Juan on February 8, 1974.

Marquez boxed future Wilfred Benítez world title challenger Emiliano Villa, by then 13-1, at Barranquilla, Colombia, on July 7 of that year, losing a ten round decision, then awaited almost one year outside the professional boxing ring before coming back, after he promptly lost to another one of Cervantes' world title challengers, the 16-3-2 Adriano Marrero of the Dominican Republic, by a ten round decision at the Roberto Clemente Coliseum in San Juan on June 28, 1975. One month and a half later, he was back in Colombia, to face 15-2-2 prospect, Miguel Betruz, whom Marquez outpointed over ten rounds at a bullring in Cartagena, on August 16, as part of the card that featured the then WBC recognized world Middleweight champion Rodrigo Valdez retain his belt with a 15 round decision over Rudy Robles.

Marquez fought Frankie Benitez, Wilfred's brother, on December 13, 1975. With a record of 22 wins and 2 losses, Benitez was considered a prospect by fans and the press alike, but Marquez derailed him with a ten round decision win in San Juan. The pair had a rematch on April 17, 1976, this time at the Roberto Clemente Coliseum, where they fought to a ten round draw (tie).

Another rematch followed the second Marquez-Benitez encounter, this time against Adriano Marrero, by now 22-6-2. This fight was also fought at the Roberto Clemente Coliseum, by then a world boxing hotbed. In a card headlined by Alfredo Escalera's defense of his WBC world Junior Lightweight championship against Ray Lunny III (which Escalera won by 12th. round knockout), Marquez and Marrero battled again, on Saturday, September 18, 1976, when Marquez avenged his previous loss to Marrero, winning by ten round decision.

The win against Marrero turned out to be the last victory of note Marquez achieved in his professional boxing career, since he only fought twice more: first, against a boxer with an 0-3 record, Rolando Garcia, knocked out in four rounds on March 17, 1977 at the Roberto Clemente Coliseum. Then Marquez faced Edwin Viruet, who had just come from lasting the full 15 round distance with Roberto Durán in a world title attempt; completing a total of 25 rounds against Durán divided in two fights without getting knocked out by the Panamanian. Viruet knocked Marquez out in round ten on April 8, 1978 at the Juan Ramon Loubriel stadium in San Juan, after which Marquez decided to retire from professional boxing.

Marquez won 32, losing 12 and tying 2 of his 46 professional boxing fights, winning 7 and losing 2 of those by knockout.

== As a trainer ==
Marquez turned to training professional boxers for a while after he himself retired as a fighter. Among those he trained were future Julio César Chávez opponent Javier Fragoso, Reynaldo "Pelayin" Hernandez, Wilfredo Rivera, Julio Cesar Chavez, Sr. and Alberto Mercado (the latter before Mercado joined the Bairoa Gym).

== Personal life ==
Marquez had a long lasting marriage to Milagros Velez, with whom he had two daughters, Yamil and Xiomara Marquez.

In 1999, he was inducted into the Rio Piedras sports Hall of Fame in Puerto Rico.

Marquez was friends with Wilfred Benítez's mother, Clara, until her death in 2008. He owned business interests in San Juan.

== Death ==
Marquez died on Tuesday, May 10, 2018 in Caguas, Puerto Rico of Kidney failure. He was buried at Cementerio Borinquen Memorial in Caguas, Puerto Rico.
