= Roberto Durán vs. Ray Lampkin =

Professional boxing match

- Date: March 2, 1975
- Venue: Gimnasio Nuevo Panama, Panama City, Panama
- Title(s) on the line: WBA and The Ring lightweight titles

Tale of the tape
Boxer	Roberto Durán	Ray Lampkin
Nickname	Manos de Piedra ("Hands of Stone")	Lightning
Hometown	Panama City, Panama Province, Panama	Portland, Oregon, U.S.
Purse	$75,000	$15,000
Pre-fight record	48–1 (42 KO)	30–3–1 (12 KO)
Age	23 years, 8 months	27 years, 3 months
Height	5 ft 7 1/2 in (171 cm)	5 ft 7 in (170 cm)
Weight	133 1/2 lb (61 kg)	134 1/2 lb (61 kg)
Style	Orthodox	Orthodox
Recognition	WBA and The Ring; Lightweight Champion	WBA; No. 1 Ranked Lightweight; NABF lightweight champion

Result
- Durán wins via 14th round KO

Roberto Durán vs. Ray Lampkin was a professional boxing match contested on March 2, 1975, for the WBA and The Ring lightweight titles.

== Background ==
In January 1975, arrangements were made that would see reigning WBA and The Ring lightweight champion Roberto Durán face top ranked lightweight contender Ray Lampkin. Original plans called for the fight to take place in Miami Beach, Florida, in what would have been Durán's first defense in the United States, however the fight ultimately took place in Durán's native Panama instead.

Lampkin came into the fight holding the NABF lightweight title, having won the vacant title by defeating Nick Alfaro, becoming the number-one ranked lightweight in the process. Though the fight with Durán was already signed, Lampkin chose to accept a tune-up fight, putting his title shot on the line in an WBA lightweight title "eliminator" bout against Miguel Mayon, the #7 ranked lightweight. Lampkin won the fight in unimpressive fashion, besting Mayon by a relatively close unanimous decision. Said Lampkin about the fight, "Yeah, the win was nice, but I'll have to do a lot better to bring home the title. This was my first fight in 3 1/2 months, and I wasn't sharp, but it was a good workout. Some people asked me why I took this fight, but if I can't beat him, why would I go to Panama at all?" Durán also took a tune-up bout in preparation for his title defense, knocking out Andres Salgado in the first round two weeks before facing Lampkin.

== The fight ==
Lampkin held his own with Durán, becoming his longest lasting opponent at the time. Though Lampkin started off strong, Durán's constant pressure coupled with the intense heat and humidity of Panama's climate tired Lampkin and Durán controlled the fight during the mid to late rounds. 39 seconds into the 14th round, Durán would finally end the fight after a big left hook sent Lampkin down for the count with his head smacking hard against the canvas and rendering him unconscious.

== Aftermath ==
Following the fight, Lampkin remained unconscious for over 80 minutes and was rushed to the hospital after attempts to revive him by administering oxygen were unsuccessful. 30 minutes after his hospitalization Lampkin regained conscious and his condition was upgraded to "delicate and not serious" several hours later. He remained in the hospital's intensive care unit for five days and was diagnosed with a cerebral concussion while his left leg was also temporarily paralyzed. When asked about his performance Durán was infamously quoted as saying "I was not in my best condition. Next time we fight, I will kill him."

== Fight card ==
Confirmed bouts:

Weight Class	Weight		vs.		Method	Round	Notes
Lightweight	135 lbs.	Roberto Durán (c)	def.	Ray Lampkin	KO	14/15	^{Note 1}
Super Featherweight	130 lbs.	Mario Mendoza	def.	Carlos Walters	TKO	9/10
Super Lightweight	140 lbs.	Alfonso Frazer	def.	José Blanco	TKO	2/10
Featherweight	126 lbs.	Reynaldo Hidalgo	def.	Roberto Suarez	PTS	10/10
Bantamweight	118 lbs.	Wilfredo Gómez	def.	Antonio da Silva	KO	2/8

^Note 1 For WBA and The Ring Lightweight titles

Preceded by vs. Andres Salgado	Roberto Durán's bouts 2 March 1975	Succeeded by vs. Jose Peterson
Preceded by vs. Gene Prado	Ray Lampkin's bouts 2 March 1975	Succeeded by vs. Alejo Jimenez
