= Pete Ranzany vs. Sugar Ray Leonard =

Boxing match

- Date: August 12, 1979
- Venue: Caesars Palace, Paradise, Nevada, U.S.
- Title(s) on the line: NABF welterweight titles

Tale of the tape
Boxer	Pete Ranzany	Ray Leonard
Nickname	Pistol	Sugar
Hometown	Sacramento, California, U.S.	Palmer Park, Maryland, U.S.
Purse	$75,000	$150,000
Pre-fight record	45–3–1 (28 KO)	23–0 (14 KO)
Age	37 years, 4 months	23 years, 2 months
Height	5 ft 10 1/2 in (179 cm)	5 ft 10 in (178 cm)
Weight	147 lb (67 kg)	147 lb (67 kg)
Style	Orthodox	Orthodox
Recognition	NABF; Welterweight Champion; WBC; No. 3 Ranked Welterweight; The Ring; No. 4 Ranked Welterweight	WBC/The Ring; No. 2 Ranked Welterweight

Result
- Leonard wins via 4th-round technical knockout

Pete Ranzany vs. Sugar Ray Leonard was a professional boxing match contested on August 12, 1979 for the NABF welterweight title. The bout would mark Leonard's first professional title fight.

== Fight Details ==
Most of the fight was spent in the center of the ring, with Ranzany serving as the aggressor by constantly moving forward, while Leonard used his trademark quick left jab effectively, sprinkled in hooks and combinations and controlled most of the fight, though Ranzany held his own through the first three rounds. However, midway through the fourth round, Leonard stunned Razany with a hard right hand and then backed him into the ropes and landed a bevy of power punches, finally sending Ranzany down with a flurry of hooks to the head. Clearly hurt from the exchange, Ranzany stumbled back to his feet and answered the referee's 10-count at eight and was allowed to continue, but Ranzany was again backed into the ropes by Leonard who landed a barrage of punches on a dazed and almost defenseless Ranzany, causing referee Joey Curtis to stop the fight and award the techninal knockout victory to Leonard at 2:41 of the round.

== Fight card ==
Confirmed bouts:

Weight Class	Weight		vs.		Method	Round	Notes
Welterweight	147 lbs.	Ray Leonard	def.	Pete Ranzany (c)	TKO	4/12	^{note 1}
Cruiserweight	190 lbs.	James Salerno	def.	Alvaro Lopez	UD	10/10
Light Middleweight	154 lbs.	Babilah McCarthy	def.	Billy Miller	TKO	2/10
Welterweight	147 lbs.	Pablo Baez	vs.	Ron Cummings	D	8/8
Light Middleweight	154 lbs.	Roger Leonard	def.	Wayne Beale	UD	8/8

^Note 1 For NABF Welterweight Title

== Broadcasting ==
Country	Broadcaster
United Kingdom	ITV
United States	ABC

Preceded by vs. Clyde Gray	Pete Ranzany's bouts 12 August 1979	Succeeded by vs. Wilson Bell
Preceded by vs. Tony Chiaverini	Ray Leonard's bouts 12 August 1979	Succeeded by vs. Andy Price
