= Vicente Mijares =

Mexican boxer (born 1954)

Personal information
- Nickname: Orgullo de Durango
- Born: Vicente Mijares Saldivar; 14 January 1954 (age 72) Gómez Palacio, Durango, Mexico
- Height: 5 ft 10 in (178 cm)
- Weight: Lightweight

Boxing career
- Reach: 73 in (183 cm)
- Stance: Orthodox

Boxing record
- Total fights: 37
- Wins: 29
- Win by KO: 13
- Losses: 7
- Draws: 1
- No contests: 0

Vicente Mijares Saldivar (born 14 January 1954) is a Mexican former professional boxer who competed from 1974 to 1984. He challenged for the WBC lightweight title in 1977.

He's the uncle of three-time world champion Cristian Mijares.

== Professional career ==
In June 1977, Mijares lost to WBC lightweight champion Esteban De Jesus, the bout was held at the Loubriel Stadium in Bayamon, Puerto Rico.

== See also ==
- Notable boxing families
