= Muhammad Ali vs. Ken Norton =

Boxing competitions

The Fight
- Date: March 31, 1973
- Venue: San Diego Sports Arena, San Diego, California
- Title(s) on the line: NABF heavyweight title

Tale of the tape
Boxer	(United States) Muhammad Ali	(United States) Ken Norton
Nickname	"The Greatest"	"The Black Hercules"
Hometown	Louisville, Kentucky	San Diego, California
Purse	$210,000	$50,000
Pre-fight record	41–1 (31 KO)	29–1 (23 KO)
Age	31 years, 2 months	29 years, 7 months
Height	6 ft 3 in (191 cm)	6 ft 3 in (191 cm)
Weight	221 lb (100 kg)	210 lb (95 kg)
Style	Orthodox	Orthodox
Recognition	NABF heavyweight Champion	WBA/WBC; No. 6 Ranked Heavyweight

Result
- Norton wins via 15-round split decision (7–4, 5–4, 5–6)

Muhammad Ali vs. Ken Norton, billed as The Fight, was a professional boxing match contested on March 31, 1973, for the NABF heavyweight championship.

== Background ==
Still rebuilding a winning record after his first professional loss to Joe Frazier, Ali faced Norton on March 31, 1973, at the San Diego Sports Arena in San Diego, California. The fight was aired live on free TV in the United States via ABC.

== The fight ==
The fight against Norton started a years-long rivalry. Ali was outmaneuvered by Norton's unorthodox fighting style, which involved jabbing from below and crossing his hands for defence. As the final bell rang, Norton won on a split decision, igniting a controversy in the boxing world. Soon after the fight, Ali was treated in hospital for a broken jaw. Ali's trainer, Angelo Dundee claimed that Ali's jaw was broken in the first round, while Norton's trainer, Eddie Futch, claimed that it was the eleventh. Norton landed 233 punches (43% accuracy) to Ali's 171 (26% accuracy), with a lead of 124 to 78 in power punches. Ali outlanded Norton in 4 rounds, while Norton outlanded Ali in 8.

== Aftermath ==
According to Dr. Gary Manchester, who performed the operation to wire Ali's jaw together: "The bone which was broken had three or four jagged edges and they kept poking into his cheek and mouth. It was a very bad break." Ali accepted his defeat graciously, agreeing to shake Norton's hand in the ring. Norton in turn visited Ali's hospital room afterward, which he believed cemented a friendship. Both sides immediately began talks for a rematch, with Ali claiming he'd win another bout and Norton saying he'd knock out Ali next time.

Ali was quoted in The Ring after the fight: "I have nobody to blame but myself for my loss to Ken Norton. I didn't train properly because I really didn't think Ken was that great a fighter. I was wrong. This time things will be different. You'll see the real Muhammad Ali."

=== Second match ===
On September 10, 1973, Ali and Norton met at the Forum, Inglewood, California, USA, for their highly anticipated rematch. Though the match was close, Ali ended up winning the split with 2 votes to 1.

=== Third match ===
Ali and Norton met for the third and last time on September 28, 1976, at Yankee Stadium, Bronx, New York, USA, completing their trilogy. Although most commentators gave the fight to Norton, ultimately, Ali won by a unanimous decision, thereby retaining the world title. Ali said during an interview with Mark Cronin in October 1976: "Kenny's style is too difficult for me. I can't beat him, and I sure don't want to fight him again. I honestly thought he beat me in Yankee Stadium, but the judges gave it to me, and I'm grateful to them." Norton was bitter, stating after the fight: "I won at least nine or ten rounds. I was robbed."

== Undercard ==
Confirmed bouts:

== Broadcasting ==
Country	Broadcaster
Mexico	Televisa
Philippines	KBS 9
United Kingdom	BBC
United States	ABC

Preceded by vs. Joe Bugner	Muhammad Ali's bouts March 31, 1973	Succeeded by Rematch
Preceded by vs. Charlie Reno	Ken Norton's bouts March 31, 1973	Succeeded by Rematch
Awards
Preceded by Roberto Durán vs. Esteban de Jesús	The Ring Upset of the Year; 1973	Succeeded by George Foreman vs. Muhammad Ali
