= Ken Norton vs. Muhammad Ali II =

Professional boxing match contested on September 10, 1973

Battle of the Broken Jaw
- Date: September 10, 1973
- Venue: The Forum, Inglewood, California
- Title(s) on the line: NABF heavyweight title

Tale of the tape
Boxer	(United States) Ken Norton	(United States) Muhammad Ali
Nickname	"The Black Hercules"	"The Greatest"
Hometown	San Diego, California	Louisville, Kentucky
Purse	$200,000	$275,000
Pre-fight record	30–1 (23 KO)	41–2 (31 KO)
Age	30 years, 1 month	31 years, 7 months
Height	6 ft 3 in (191 cm)	6 ft 3 in (191 cm)
Weight	205 lb (93 kg)	212 lb (96 kg)
Style	Orthodox	Orthodox
Recognition	WBA/WBC; No. 1 Ranked Heavyweight; NABF heavyweight Champion	WBA/WBC; No. 2 Ranked Heavyweight; Former undisputed heavyweight champion

Result
- Ali wins via 12-round split decision (7-5, 6-5, 5-6)

Ken Norton vs. Muhammad Ali II, billed as Battle of the Broken Jaw, was a professional boxing match contested on September 10, 1973, for the NABF heavyweight championship.

== Background ==
Norton was in good shape going into the second fight while Ali took to training at his training camp in Deer Lake, Pennsylvania, where he "sought to whip his once Adonis-like physique back into shape." Ali weighed in at 211 for this fight, 10 pounds lighter than the first. Norton was 210 in the first and 205 for the second. Norton weighed in at 206 lbs (5 pounds lighter than his first match with Ali) and leading to some boxing writers suggesting that his preparation was perhaps too intense and that he may had overtrained.

== The fight ==
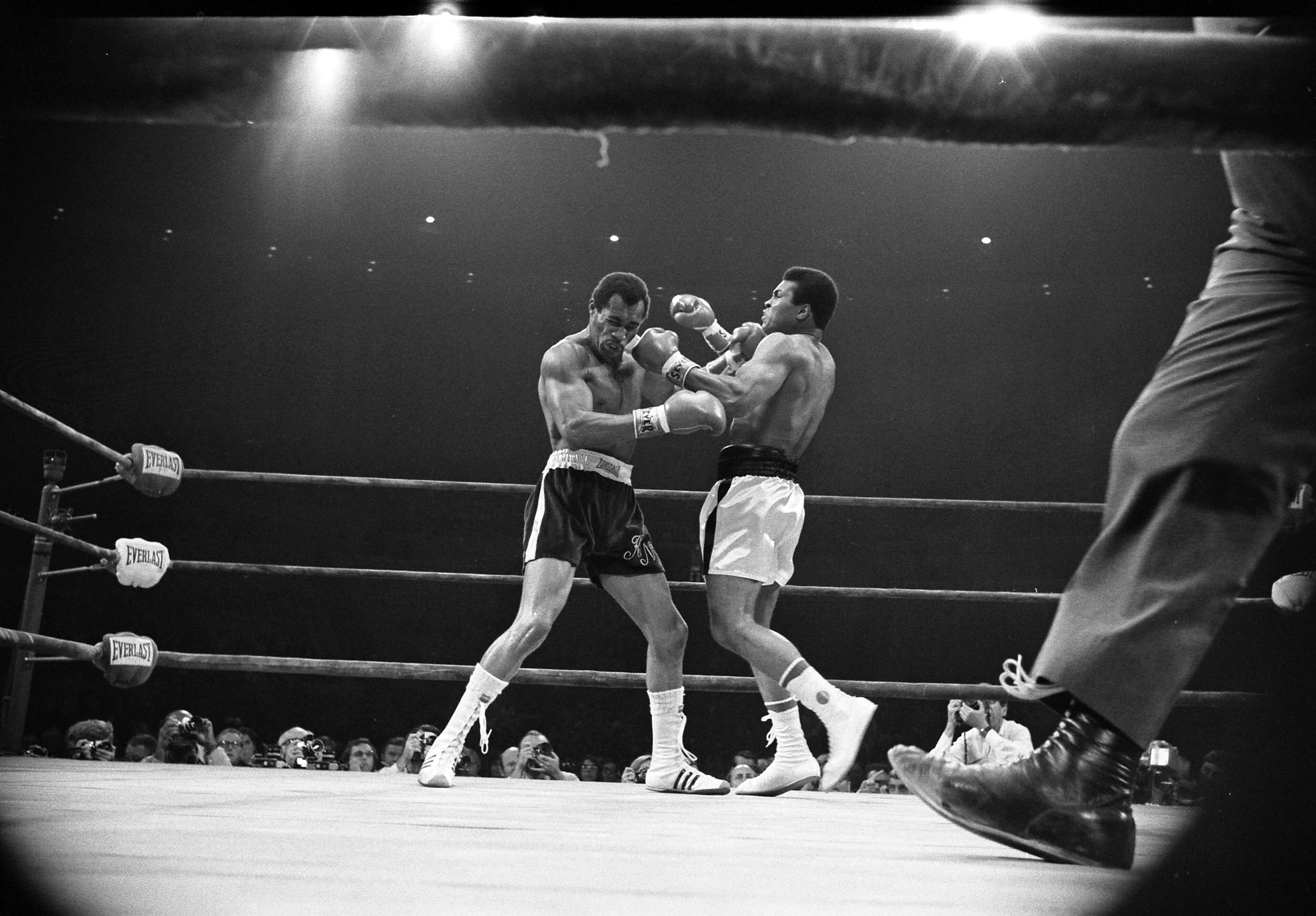
Ali and Norton in action

As the fight began, both Ali and Norton appeared in shape and energetic. However, Ali demonstrated his physical stamina by skipping without pause and standing between rounds. Norton came out aggressively in the beginning of the fifth round, leading with a barrage of jabs and pushing Ali to a more defensive posture. During the ABC broadcast of the fight, broadcaster (and Ali confidant and friend) Howard Cosell repeatedly told viewers a dancing and jabbing Ali was dominating the action despite Norton's constant offense and Ali's inability to penetrate Norton's awkward crab-like cross-armed defensive style. In the final round, Ali dominated with a series of combinations. Though the match was close, Ali ended up winning the split decision with Dick Young scoring it 7–5 and John Thomas 6–5 with George Latka having for Norton 6–5.

== Aftermath ==
The decision was controversial. Norton had the edge in shots landed, hitting Ali with 197 punches while Ali hit him with 175, and leading 144 to 91 in power punches and 40% to 28% in accuracy. Norton landed more punches in 7 rounds and Ali did so in 4, with 1 round even. The Associated Press scored it 6–5 for Norton while United Press International had it 9–2 for Ali. In an unofficial ringside poll of sportswriters: 8 scored it for Ali, 6 scored it for Norton, and 1 scored it even.

After the bout, Ali stated: "Ken Norton is the best man I have ever fought. No man could hit me as much as Norton did in the shape that I am. Frazier couldn't do it... Foreman wouldn't do it. I imagine if you watched films of my old fights, I'm not too much slower, but I can't be 22 again."

== Undercard ==
Confirmed bouts:

== Broadcasting ==
Country	Broadcaster
Mexico	Televisa
Philippines	KBS 9
United Kingdom	BBC
United States	ABC

Preceded by First bout	Ken Norton's bouts 10 September 1973	Succeeded by vs. George Foreman
Preceded by First bout	Muhammad Ali's bouts 10 September 1973	Succeeded by vs. Rudie Lubbers
