= Roberto Durán vs. Esteban de Jesús II =

Boxing match

- Date: March 16, 1974
- Venue: Gimnasio Nuevo Panama, Panama City, Panama
- Title(s) on the line: WBA and The Ring lightweight titles

Tale of the tape
Boxer	Roberto Durán	Esteban de Jesús
Nickname	Manos de Piedra ("Hands of Stone")	Vita
Hometown	Panama City, Panama	Carolina, Puerto Rico
Purse	$125,000	$45,000
Pre-fight record	41–1 (36 KO)	41–1 (22 KO)
Age	22 years, 9 months	23 years, 7 months
Height	5 ft 7 1/2 in (171 cm)	5 ft 4 1/2 in (164 cm)
Weight	134 lb (61 kg)	134 1/4 lb (61 kg)
Style	Orthodox	Orthodox
Recognition	WBA and The Ring; Lightweight Champion; WBC; No. 1 Ranked Lightweight	WBA; No. 2 Ranked Lightweight; WBC; No. 5 Ranked Lightweight; The Ring; No. 1 Ranked Lightweight

Result
- Durán wins via 11th-round KO

Roberto Durán vs. Esteban de Jesús II was a professional boxing match contested on March 16, 1974, for the WBA and The Ring lightweight titles.

== Background ==
15 months prior, undefeated WBA lightweight champion Roberto Durán faced top ranked contender Esteban de Jesús in a non-title bout in Madison Square Garden. Durán was dropped in the opening round and de Jesús outboxed the champion the rest of the way to earn a unanimous decision victory and give Durán his first loss.

After that fight, both Durán and de Jesús would go on impressive win streaks. Durán would go 10–0, successfully defending his lightweight title three times while also winning seven non-title fights to bring his record up to 41–1 then while de Jesús had gone 7–0 to also bring his record up to 41–1. Finally, the long-awaited rematch was made official for March 16, 1974 in Durán's native Panama.

== The fight ==
For the second time in a row, de Jesús would score an opening round knockdown, dropping Durán with a left hook during the first minute of the round. Durán arose from the knockdown and unlike their previous fight, fought aggressively and by the third round, had taken control of the fight. In the final minute of the seventh round Durán scored a knockdown of his own after he landed a barrage of punches finishing with a right hand after which De Jesús crumpled to the ground, though he survived the round despite a furious rally from Durán. A clearly exhausted de Jesús would make it to the 11th round, though Durán sent him down again following a five-punch combination, though he narrowly missed beating the referee's 10-count and Durán was named winner by knockout.

== Fight card ==
Confirmed bouts:

Weight Class	Weight		vs.		Method	Round	Notes
Lightweight	135 lbs.	Roberto Durán	def.	Esteban de Jesús	KO	11/15	^{Note 1}
Bantamweight	118 lbs.	Marcos Britton	def.	Jorge Madrigal	TKO	1/10
Featherweight	126 lbs.	Mario Mendoza	def.	Enrique Maxwell	KO	7/10
Featherweight	126 lbs.	Rodolfo Francis	def.	Norberto Reyes Blanquicet	TKO	1/10

^Note 1 For WBA and The Ring Lightweight titles

== Broadcasting ==
Country	Broadcaster
United Kingdom	ITV
United States	ABC

Preceded by vs. Armando Mendoza	Roberto Durán's bouts 16 March 1974	Succeeded by vs. Flash Gallego
Preceded by vs. Alfonso Frazer	Esteban de Jesús's bouts 16 March 1974	Succeeded by vs. Gerardo Ferrat
