= Esteban de Jesús =

Puerto Rican boxer (1950–1989)

Personal information
- Nickname: Vita
- Nationality: Puerto Rican
- Born: August 2, 1950 Carolina, Puerto Rico
- Died: May 11, 1989 (aged 38) San Juan, Puerto Rico
- Height: 5 ft 4 1/2 in (164 cm)
- Weight: Lightweight; Light welterweight

Boxing career
- Reach: 67 in (170 cm)
- Stance: Orthodox

Boxing record
- Total fights: 62
- Wins: 57
- Win by KO: 32
- Losses: 5

Esteban de Jesús (August 2, 1950 – May 11, 1989) was a Puerto Rican boxer who reigned as the WBC lightweight champion from 1976 to 1978. De Jesús, a native of the town of Carolina, Puerto Rico, was a gymmate of Wilfred Benítez and was trained by Benitez's father, Gregorio Benitez. He was the first boxer to defeat Roberto Durán as a pro, and the only fighter to defeat Duran during his lightweight reign. His career was mired in controversy, problems, and scandals.

== Professional career ==
De Jesús debuted as a professional in 1969, he won his first twenty fights, thirteen by knockout. He then stepped up in class, for the first time, when he boxed future world title challenger Josue Marquez in 1971, beating him in a twelve-round decision to claim the Puerto Rican national Lightweight championship.. His next fight was a fourth-round knockout victory over Victor Ortíz. After that, there was a rematch with Marquez, who was beaten again, also over twelve rounds, to retain the Puerto Rican Lightweight title.

Next came his first international fight, in Caracas, Venezuela, against the future four-time world title challenger Leonel Hernandez. De Jesús won the ten round fight by unanimous decision in what was the start of a four fight tour of Venezuela. That Venezuelan campaign ended with a ten-round decision loss against former world champion Antonio Gomez in Caracas.

1972 was a pivotal year in de Jesús' career. He won six fights in a row, including a twelve-round knockout win in a third fight with Marquez to again retain the Puerto Rican Lightweight title, and a ten-round decision over Doug McClendon. Despite all the wins, he was virtually unknown to most boxing fans. That changed quickly in his last fight of 1972 against the undefeated new world's Lightweight champion Roberto Durán at the Madison Square Garden arena. In a televised bout that marked the beginning of the "Durán - de Jesús trilogy", de Jesús dropped Durán in round one and went on to inflict Durán's first defeat in a ten-round decision.

In 1973, he was rewarded for his efforts, receiving a chance to challenge Ray Lampkin for the North American Boxing Federation lightweight belt. He won the vacant title by beating Lampkin in a twelve-round decision. He went on to beat Johnny Gant and Raul Montoya in ten-round decisions and beat Lampkin by decision in a rematch in New York. He finished 1973 with a first-round knockout win over fringe contender Al Foster.

He began 1974 by knocking out former world Jr. Welterweight champion Alfonso "Peppermint" Frazer in ten rounds in San Juan, Puerto Rico, after which he traveled to Panama City to receive his first world title shot and, at the same time, face Durán in the second fight of their trilogy. He once again dropped Durán in round one, but this time Durán rebounded and dominated the bout, retaining the title in an eleventh-round knockout. He recovered from that defeat with two more wins before the end of the year.

In 1975, he went up in weight briefly, and after beating Jesse Lara by a knockout in three, he returned to Panama City to challenge Colombia's Antonio Cervantes for the world's Jr. Welterweight title, losing in a fifteen-round decision. He beat Rudy Barros by knockout in round five to end that year, and started 1976 by beating Valentin Ramos by knockout in round two.

Next came his third world title try when the WBC's world Lightweight champion Ishimatsu Suzuki of Japan traveled to Puerto Rico to defend his title against de Jesús. The third time proved to be the charm for de Jesús, who won the world title by beating Suzuki in a fifteen-round decision. He retained the title against Hector Medina with a knockout in round seven.

De Jesús admitted publicly to using drugs during his boxing career. He began using cocaine and heroin early in his boxing career with an older brother, Enrique.

In 1977, he retained the title against Buzzsaw Yamabe by knockout in round six and against Vicente Mijares Saldivar by knockout in round eleven.

1978 began with the third and final chapter of his trilogy with Durán. In a title unification bout in Las Vegas, which displayed Durán at the peak of his power, Durán systematically broke down de Jesús resulting in a twelfth-round knockout.

De Jesús rebounded with three wins before the end of that year, including one over former world title challenger Edwin Viruet.

In 1979, he had two more wins, including one over Jimmy Blevins. After beating José Vallejo by a knockout in round seven in San Juan to start 1980, he traveled to Bloomington, Minnesota, to challenge Saoul Mamby for Mamby's WBC world Jr. Welterweight title, in the major supporting event of the Larry Holmes-Scott Le Doux world heavyweight championship bout's undercard. In what turned out to be his last fight, he was beaten by a knockout in thirteen rounds.

His record was 57 wins and 5 losses, with 32 wins by knockout.

== Crime, commuted sentence and death ==
On November 27, 1980, in what became a famous case in Puerto Rico, after having injected himself with cocaine, de Jesús was involved in a traffic dispute with 17-year-old Roberto Cintron Gonzalez, which ended in de Jesús fatally shooting Gonzalez in the head. De Jesús was sentenced to life in prison.

In 1985, he learned that his brother Enrique, with whom he had shared needles, had died of AIDS. De Jesús tested positive for the virus, and symptoms began to appear. He died in San Juan, Puerto Rico on May 11, 1989, aged 38, of an AIDS-related illness.

== Professional boxing record ==
62 fights	57 wins	5 losses
By knockout	32	3
By decision	25	2

No.	Result	Record	Opponent	Type	Round, time	Date	Location	Notes
62	Loss	57–5	Saoul Mamby	TKO	13 (15)	1980-07-07	Metropolitan Sports Center, Bloomington, Minnesota, U.S.	For WBC super lightweight title
61	Win	57–4	José Vallejo	KO	7 (10)	1980-05-10	San Juan, Puerto Rico	
60	Win	56–4	Ruby Ortiz	UD	10 (10)	1979-11-09	Madison Square Garden, New York City, New York, U.S.	
59	Win	55–4	Jimmy Blevins	UD	10 (10)	1979-10-04	Felt Forum, New York City, New York, U.S.	
58	Win	54–4	Edwin Viruet	SD	10 (10)	1978-10-27	Madison Square Garden, New York City, New York, U.S.	
57	Win	53–4	Chuchu Hernandez	TKO	2 (?)	1978-07-08	San Juan, Puerto Rico	
56	Win	52–4	Pablo Baez	TKO	3 (10)	1978-06-03	Roberto Clemente Coliseum, San Juan, Puerto Rico	
55	Loss	51–4	Roberto Durán	TKO	12 (15)	1978-01-21	Caesars Palace, Paradise, Nevada, U.S.	Lost WBC lightweight title; For WBA and The Ring lightweight titles
54	Win	51–3	James Brackett	PTS	10 (10)	1977-09-10	Roberto Clemente Coliseum, San Juan, Puerto Rico	
53	Win	50–3	Vicente Mijares	KO	11 (15)	1977-06-25	Juan Ramón Loubriel Stadium, Bayamon, Puerto Rico	Retained WBC lightweight title
52	Win	49–3	Buzzsaw Yamabe	TKO	6 (15)	1977-02-12	Juan Ramón Loubriel Stadium, Bayamon, Puerto Rico	Retained WBC lightweight title
51	Win	48–3	Hector Julio Medina	KO	7 (15)	1976-09-10	Juan Ramón Loubriel Stadium, Bayamon, Puerto Rico	Retained WBC lightweight title
50	Win	47–3	Guts Ishimatsu	UD	15 (15)	1976-05-08	Juan Ramón Loubriel Stadium, Bayamon, Puerto Rico	Won WBC lightweight title
49	Win	46–3	Valente Ramos	TKO	2 (?)	1976-03-06	Hiram Bithorn Stadium, San Juan, Puerto Rico	
48	Win	45–3	Rudy Barro	TKO	5 (?)	1975-10-11	Roberto Clemente Coliseum, San Juan, Puerto Rico	
47	Loss	44–3	Antonio Cervantes	UD	15 (15)	1975-05-17	Gimnasio Nuevo Panama, Panama City, Panama	For WBA super lightweight title
46	Win	44–2	Jesse Lara	KO	3 (?)	1975-03-15	El Poliedro, Caracas, Venezuela	
45	Win	43–2	Javier Ayala	PTS	10 (10)	1974-09-02	Roberto Clemente Coliseum, San Juan, Puerto Rico	
44	Win	42–2	Gerardo Ferrat	TKO	5 (?)	1974-06-10	San Juan, Puerto Rico	
43	Loss	41–2	Roberto Durán	KO	11 (15)	1974-03-16	Gimnasio Nuevo Panama, Panama City, Panama	For WBA lightweight title
42	Win	41–1	Alfonso Frazer	KO	10 (10)	1974-01-07	Roberto Clemente Coliseum, San Juan, Puerto Rico	
41	Win	40–1	Al Foster	KO	1 (10)	1973-11-22	San Juan, Puerto Rico	
40	Win	39–1	Miguel Mayan	PTS	10 (10)	1973-10-29	San Juan, Puerto Rico	
39	Win	38–1	Radames Checo	KO	1 (12)	1973-09-08	Gimnasio Nuevo Panama, Panama City, Panama	
38	Win	37–1	Ray Lampkin	UD	12 (12)	1973-07-14	Felt Forum, New York City, New York, U.S.	Retained NABF lightweight title
37	Win	36–1	Raul Montoya	PTS	10 (10)	1973-05-21	Roberto Clemente Coliseum, San Juan, Puerto Rico	
36	Win	35–1	Johnny Gant	UD	10 (10)	1973-04-16	San Juan, Puerto Rico	
35	Win	34–1	Ray Lampkin	UD	12 (12)	1973-02-16	Roberto Clemente Coliseum, San Juan, Puerto Rico	Won vacant NABF lightweight title
34	Win	33–1	Roberto Durán	UD	10 (10)	1972-11-17	Madison Square Garden, New York City, New York, U.S.	
33	Win	32–1	Doc McClendon	PTS	10 (10)	1972-10-30	San Juan, Puerto Rico	
32	Win	31–1	Raimundo Dias	PTS	10 (10)	1972-09-18	San Juan, Puerto Rico	
31	Win	30–1	Chuck Wilburn	UD	10 (10)	1972-07-28	Madison Square Garden, New York City, New York, U.S.	
30	Win	29–1	Angel Robinson Garcia	PTS	10 (10)	1972-07-08	San Juan, Puerto Rico	
29	Win	28–1	Josue Marquez	TKO	12 (12)	1972-05-01	Felt Forum, New York City, New York, U.S.	Retained Puerto Rican lightweight title
28	Win	27–1	George Foster	TKO	8 (10)	1972-04-10	Felt Forum, New York City, New York, U.S.	
27	Win	26–1	Percy Hayles	UD	10 (10)	1972-02-18	Hiram Bithorn Stadium, San Juan, Puerto Rico	
26	Win	25–1	Milton Mendez	KO	5 (?)	1971-11-30	Caracas, Venezuela	
25	Win	24–1	Johnny Harp	UD	10 (10)	1971-11-19	Parque Isidoro García, Mayaguez, Puerto Rico	
24	Win	23–1	Frank Leroy	KO	5 (10)	1971-10-30	La Cancha Country Club, San Juan, Puerto Rico	
23	Win	22–1	Josue Marquez	UD	12 (12)	1971-09-04	Hiram Bithorn Stadium, San Juan, Puerto Rico	Retained Puerto Rican lightweight title
22	Win	21–1	Victor Ortiz	TKO	5 (10)	1971-08-07	Hiram Bithorn Stadium, San Juan, Puerto Rico	
21	Win	20–1	Josue Marquez	PTS	12 (12)	1971-07-24	San Juan, Puerto Rico	Won Puerto Rican lightweight title
20	Win	19–1	Armando Mendoza	TKO	6 (10)	1971-06-05	Nuevo Circo, Caracas, Venezuela	
19	Win	18–1	Leonel Hernandez	UD	10 (10)	1971-05-03	Palacio de Deportes, Caracas, Venezuela	
18	Win	17–1	Gustavo Briceno	UD	10 (10)	1971-04-24	La Cancha Country Club, San Juan, Puerto Rico	
17	Loss	16–1	Antonio Gómez	UD	10 (10)	1971-02-27	Nuevo Circo, Caracas, Venezuela	
16	Win	16–0	Jose Llanos	KO	7 (10)	1970-10-24	Hiram Bithorn Stadium, San Juan, Puerto Rico	
15	Win	15–0	Johnny Sandoval	UD	10 (10)	1970-08-22	La Cancha Country Club, San Juan, Puerto Rico	
14	Win	14–0	Jose Jimenez	TKO	5 (10)	1970-07-30	Hiram Bithorn Stadium, San Juan, Puerto Rico	
13	Win	13–0	Coverly Kid Daniels	KO	2 (?)	1970-05-20	Parque Isidoro García, Mayaguez, Puerto Rico	
12	Win	12–0	Ike Estrada	KO	2 (?)	1970-05-02	La Cancha Country Club, San Juan, Puerto Rico	
11	Win	11–0	Jose Jimenez	PTS	10 (10)	1970-04-30	Ponce, Puerto Rico	
10	Win	10–0	Bobby Parnell	TKO	1 (10)	1970-03-28	La Cancha Country Club, San Juan, Puerto Rico	
9	Win	9–0	Braulio Rodriguez	TKO	8 (10)	1970-02-28	La Cancha Country Club, San Juan, Puerto Rico	
8	Win	8–0	Chino Guerrero	TKO	3 (10)	1970-02-14	La Cancha Country Club, San Juan, Puerto Rico	
7	Win	7–0	Ramon Dominguez	TKO	2 (10)	1970-01-24	La Cancha Country Club, San Juan, Puerto Rico	
6	Win	6–0	Ivelaw Eastman	KO	5 (6)	1969-11-22	Country Club Stadium, Carolina, Puerto Rico	
5	Win	5–0	Tommy Sheffield	TKO	2 (6)	1969-10-18	San Juan, Puerto Rico	
4	Win	4–0	Ramon Montes	TKO	1 (6)	1969-09-27	La Cancha Country Club, San Juan, Puerto Rico	
3	Win	3–0	Johnny Sandoval	UD	6 (6)	1969-08-23	La Cancha Country Club, San Juan, Puerto Rico	
2	Win	2–0	Francisco Maldonado	KO	3 (6)	1969-08-02	La Cancha Country Club, San Juan, Puerto Rico	
1	Win	1–0	Braulio Rodriguez	TKO	4 (4)	1969-07-19	Hiram Bithorn Stadium, San Juan, Puerto Rico	

== See also ==
- List of world lightweight boxing champions
- List of Puerto Rican boxing world champions
- Sports in Puerto Rico
- Afro–Puerto Ricans

Sporting positions
Regional boxing titles
Vacant Title last held by Chango Carmona	NABF lightweight champion February 16, 1973 – 1973; Vacated	Vacant Title next held by Ray Lampkin
World boxing titles
Preceded by Guts Ishimatsu	WBC lightweight champion May 8, 1976 – January 21, 1978	Succeeded by Roberto Durán
Lightweight status
Preceded by Carlos Teo Cruz	Latest born world champion to die May 12, 1989 – December 1, 1997	Succeeded by Edwin Rosario
