= Adolfo Viruet =

Puerto Rican boxer

- Born: 29 January 1952 (age 74); Hoboken, New Jersey
- Citizenship: United States
- Occupation: boxer

Adolfo Viruet (born 29 January 1952 in Hoboken, New Jersey) is a retired Puerto Rican and NABF junior welterweight champion boxer. He fought five world champions.

== Career ==
Becoming professional on October 30, 1969, at age 18, Viruet was a contender in the light welterweight and welterweight divisions during the late 1970s and early 1980s, fighting such opponents as Roberto Durán, Sugar Ray Leonard, Donald Curry, Bruce Curry, Pete Ranzany and Luis Resto. He fought left-handed. He retired in 1982 with a final record of 23-6-1.

Viruet is 16-0-0 (5 KOs) as a Light-Welterweight.

Viruet had long spurts of inactivity, with no bouts from November 1970 to April 1972, and only one bout in 1974. He had no professional boxing activity because of his broken left hand. During this time he was training in his gym in NY and Hoboken NJ.

In August 1975 in Las Vegas, Viruet 16-0-0 (5 KOs) upset (W Unan Dec 12) United States Light-Welterweight Champion and #3 WBC-ranked Monroe Brooks, who was 25-1-3 (15 KOs) coming into the contest.

He also was the first trainer of Arturo Gatti.

== Personal life ==
Viruet grew up in The Bronx. His brother, Edwin Viruet, was also a professional boxer.
