= Roberto Durán =

Panamanian boxer (born 1951)

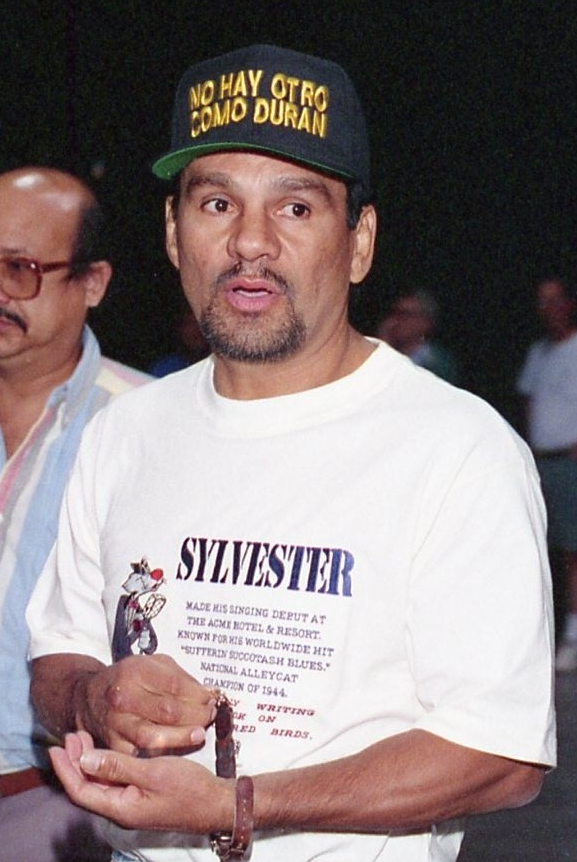
- Durán before his 1994 fight with Vinny Pazienza

Personal information
- Nicknames: Manos de Piedra ("Hands of Stone"); El Cholo
- Born: Roberto Carlos Durán Samaniego; June 16, 1951 (age 75) Guararé, Panama
- Height: 5 ft 7 in (170 cm)
- Weight: Lightweight; Welterweight; Light middleweight; Middleweight; Super middleweight

Boxing career
- Reach: 66 in (168 cm)
- Stance: Orthodox

Boxing record
- Total fights: 119
- Wins: 103
- Win by KO: 70
- Losses: 16

Roberto Carlos Durán Samaniego (born June 16, 1951) is a Panamanian former professional boxer who competed from 1968 to 2001. He held world championships in four weight classes: lightweight, welterweight, light middleweight and middleweight. Duran also reigned as the undisputed lightweight champion. He is also the second boxer to have competed over a span of five decades, the first being Jack Johnson. Durán was known as a versatile, technical brawler and pressure fighter, which earned him the nickname "Manos de Piedra" ("Hands of Stone") for his formidable punching power and excellent defense. Durán is regarded by many as one of the greatest boxers of all time, and the greatest Latino boxer of all time.

The Sporting News recognized Durán as the Fighter of the Decade for the 1970s. In 2002, Durán was voted by The Ring magazine as the fifth greatest fighter of the last 80 years, while boxing historian Bert Sugar rated him as the eighth greatest fighter of all time. The Associated Press voted him as the best lightweight of the 20th century, with many considering him the greatest lightweight of all time. Durán retired for good in January 2002 at age 50, following a car crash in Argentina in October 2001, after which he had required life saving surgery. He had previously retired in November 1980, June 1984 and August 1998, only to change his mind. Durán ended his career with a professional record of 119 fights, 103 wins, and 70 knockouts. From May 1971 up until his second fight against Sugar Ray Leonard in November 1980, Durán was trained by legendary boxing trainer Ray Arcel.

== Early life and amateur career ==
Roberto Durán was born on June 16, 1951, in Guararé, Panama. His mother, Clara Samaniego, was a native of Guararé and his father, Margarito Duran, an American of Mexican heritage was stationed in Panama for the U.S. Army at the time of Roberto's birth. He was raised in the slums of El Chorrillo in the district "La Casa de Piedra" (The House of Stone), in Panama City. He began sparring with experienced boxers at the Neco de La Guardia gymnasium when he was only eight years old. He had the nickname "Cholo" because of his mixed heritage.

Durán competed as an amateur beginning in February 1965. He compiled a record of 29–3 (other sources say 18–3 or 13–3), with all 3 losses coming in Durán's first 3 amateur fights.

== Professional career ==
=== Lightweight ===
Durán made his professional debut in February 1968 at the age of 16. He was given the nickname "Manos de Piedra", "hands of stone," by Panamanian boxing writer Alfonso Castillo, after defeating Benny Huertas on September 13, 1971. Following this bout, he was then trained by Ray Arcel.

Durán won his first 31 consecutive professional fights, and scored knockout victories over future Featherweight Champion Ernesto Marcel and former Super Featherweight Champion Hiroshi Kobayashi. He fought his first title bout in June 1972, where he defeated Ken Buchanan at Madison Square Garden for the WBA Lightweight Championship. Durán, as a 2-to-1 underdog, scored a knockdown against the defending champion just fifteen seconds into the opening round and battered him throughout the bout. He was well ahead on all three cards as the bell rang to end the 13th round, at which time Durán (apparently not hearing the bell) continued to throw a couple of extra punches as Buchanan lay on the ropes. As Durán continued punching, the referee, Johnny LoBianco, grabbed him to pull him away. He pulled down on Durán's arms, which led to a seemingly accidental low blow. Buchanan dropped to the canvas in pain. His trainer Gil Clancy later said he had believed the blow to have been caused by a knee. Durán was not disqualified from the bout; instead, he was deemed as winner by thirteenth-round technical knockout. Columnist Red Smith of The New York Times wrote that LoBianco had to award the victory to Durán, even if the punch was a low blow, as "anything short of pulling a knife is regarded indulgently" in American boxing. Buchanan said he left the fight "with sore balls".

Durán followed up on his title winning performance with several non-title matches. Later that year, in another non-title bout, he lost a ten-round decision to Esteban De Jesús. Durán got back on track with successful title defenses against Jimmy Robertson, Hector Thompson and future Lightweight Champion Guts Ishimatsu. In 1974, Durán avenged his loss to De Jesús with a brutal eleventh round knock out. In 1976, he defeated future Light Welterweight Champion Saoul Mamby. Overall, Durán made twelve successful defenses of his title (eleven coming by knockout) and amassed a record of 62–1. His last defense was in 1978, when Durán fought a third bout with De Jesus in a unification match wherein Durán once again knocked out De Jesus and captured his WBC Lightweight Championship. Durán later visited De Jesús in 1989 when De Jesús was dying of AIDS. “When I see him there so thin, my tears run out because he used to be a muscular guy," Durán said. "I start crying and I hug him, and I kiss him and I tell my daughter to kiss him.” The picture of their embrace was widely distributed, at a time when AIDS patients faced significant stigma.

Durán gave up the Undisputed Lightweight Championship in February 1979.

=== Welterweight and The Brawl in Montreal ===
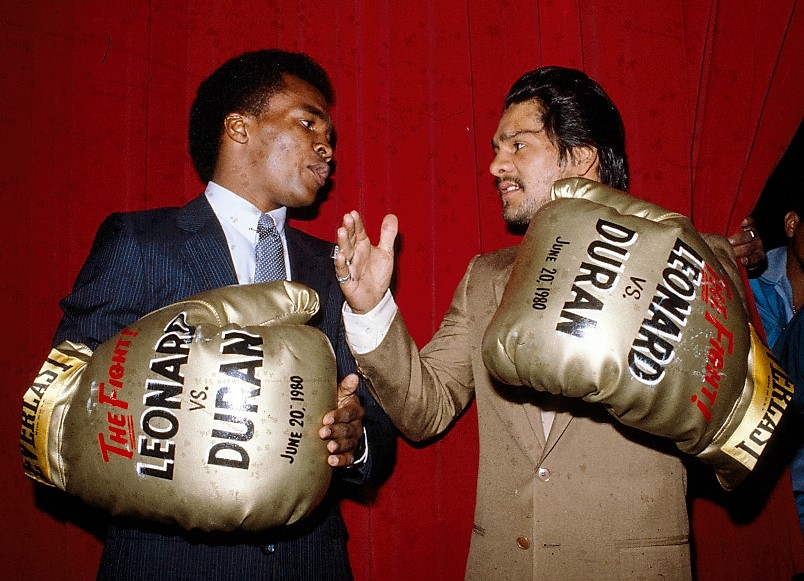
Leonard and Durán posing with oversized boxing gloves before June 20, 1980, fight

Vacating the Lightweight title was a buildup for an attempt at the Welterweight title. Durán earned wins against former WBC Welterweight Champion Carlos Palomino and Zeferino Gonzales, among others. These victories set the stage for a title bout against then-undefeated WBC Welterweight Champion Sugar Ray Leonard. The venue chosen was the Olympic Stadium in Montreal (the same location where Leonard won an Olympic gold medal during the 1976 Summer Olympics). Durán resented the fact that he was getting only one-fifth of the money that Leonard was getting, despite the fact that Durán was entering the bout with an incredible 71–1 record and seen by many as the best boxer of the decade of the 1970s. To the surprise of Leonard and his camp, who had expected a warm homecoming from the place where Leonard had won Olympic gold, Leonard only got a mixed reception in Montreal, while Durán was incredibly popular with the crowd, with Leonard later admitting that Durán's popularity in Canada "threw me for a loop". On June 20, 1980, Durán captured the WBC Welterweight title by defeating Leonard via a 15-round unanimous decision (145–144, 148–147, 146–144), although it was incorrectly announced as a majority decision in the ring with the 148–147 scorecard being incorrectly announced as 147–147. The fight became known as "The Brawl in Montreal".

==== "No Más" in New Orleans ====
After defeating Leonard in Montreal, Durán gained iconic status in his home country, Panama. Leonard initiated the rematch clause and asked for the fight to be the following November. In their second fight, Leonard successfully changed his tactics, using more footwork and movement than he had in their first fight, and Durán was unable to get Leonard against the ropes. During the seventh round, after Leonard had gained a slight lead on the scorecards, he began taunting and mocking Durán. Towards the end of the eighth round, Durán suddenly stopped fighting, and according to referee Octavio Meyran and ABC commentator Howard Cosell, Durán repeatedly said "No más" ("no more"), which was denied by Durán, his cornermen Ray Arcel and Freddie Brown, and his manager Carlos Eleta, with Durán claiming he had said "No quiero pelear con el payaso" ("I do not want to fight with this clown [Leonard]"). According to Meyran, in addition to saying "No más", Durán also said in broken English "I don't box anymore". In a 2016 interview, Durán claimed that what he actually said was, "No sigo" ("I won't go on"). For a brief time after the "No más" debacle, Durán retired from boxing, but soon changed his mind, not wanting to end his career on such a bad note.

=== Light middleweight and middleweight ===
He took some time to recover from that fight and gained even more weight to contend for the WBC Light Middleweight title, but losing in his first attempt at a championship in that division on January 30, 1982, against Wilfred Benítez by a 15-round unanimous decision; this after having defeated Nino Gonzalez and Luigi Minchillo, two rated Light Middleweights, both by ten-round decisions in non-title bouts. Durán was also to lose his comeback fight in September 1982 in Detroit. Kirkland Laing, from London, shocked the boxing world, producing the type of display his talents promised yet he so rarely produced, taking the split decision. After being relegated to a 10-round walk out win over Englishman Jimmy Batten at The Battle of The Champions in Miami, Durán signed with promoter Bob Arum. This marked the beginning of a comeback in which he beat former world champion and now hall of famer José Cuevas via a fourth round knock-out, which earned him a second crack at the light middleweight title, this time against WBA Champion Davey Moore.

The WBA title bout took place at Madison Square Garden on June 16, 1983, which also happened to be Durán's 32nd birthday. The still inexperienced Moore (12–0) was game through the first three rounds, but by the 4th, Durán said he knew Moore couldn't hurt him, and an onslaught began. The pro-Durán crowd at ringside cheered as Durán relentlessly punished Moore. By the end of the sixth round, Moore's eye had swollen shut and he was floored near the end of the seventh. Finally the fight was stopped in the eighth round as Moore was taking a horrific beating and Durán won his third world title. After the victory, Durán was hoisted up in the air as the crowd sang "Happy Birthday" to a sobbing Durán.

Durán later fought for the World Middleweight Championship, meeting Marvelous Marvin Hagler in Las Vegas on November 10, 1983. During the fight, Duran broke his hand and lost in a very competitive fight that went the full fifteen rounds. After 13 rounds, two of the judges had Durán one point ahead, and the other judge had it even. Hagler fought tenaciously to win the final two rounds and get a unanimous decision victory. The judges' scores were 144–142, 144–143, and 146–145. Despite the loss, Durán became the second man to take Hagler to a fifteen-round decision (Vito Antuofermo was the other) and the only one to do so while Hagler was the world champion.

In June 1984, Durán was stripped of his Light Middleweight title when the WBA did not approve of his fight with WBC Champion Thomas "Hitman" Hearns and took away recognition of Durán as world champion the moment Durán stepped into the ring to box Hearns. Hearns dropped Durán twice in the first round and as he rose to his feet after the second knockdown, which ended the round, the former champion did not know where his corner was. Hearns went on to knock Durán down a third time in the second round and the fight was stopped, marking the first time in his career that Durán had been knocked out in a fight (the "No Más" fight was officially recorded as a technical knockout, because Durán quit). Durán then retired for a second time, but changed his mind over a year later, and was back fighting in early 1986.

Durán did not contend another title fight until 1989, but made the shot count when he won the WBC Middleweight title from Iran Barkley in February. The fight is considered one of Durán's greatest achievements, as the 37-year-old former lightweight champion took the middleweight crown, his fourth title. In a tough, back-and-forth fight, Durán knocked Barkley down in the eleventh round and Durán won a split decision (118–112, 116–112, 113–116). The bout was named the 1989 "Fight of the Year" by The Ring.

=== Super middleweight ===
Duran moved up to super middleweight for a third fight with Sugar Ray Leonard in December 1989 (a fight dubbed Uno Más — One More — by promoters). Leonard's WBC super-middleweight title was on the line, although Leonard's camp insisted that the fight with Durán be at a 162lbs catchweight instead of the 168lbs super-middleweight limit that Durán favoured. In the end, both weighed in below the 160lbs middleweight limit. Durán was uncharacteristically flat for most of what was a strange fight. Although Leonard won the fight by a wide unanimous decision (120–110, 119–109, 116–111), by the end of the fight Leonard looked the worse for wear as he had suffered several bad cuts. Leonard's lip was busted by a headbutt in the fourth round, his left eye was cut in the eleventh round and his right eye was cut in the twelfth round. The cuts required more than 60 stitches. Durán didn't fight again until 1991, so had given up his WBC middleweight crown that he had won against Barkley. Durán seemed to be in decline after the third fight against Leonard, but he persisted and worked his way into title shots for the lesser IBC super-middleweight and middleweight titles in 1994, 1995 and 1996.

Durán fought Vinny Pazienza twice, in June 1994 and January 1995, for the IBC Super Middleweight Championship, with Pazienza winning both times by unanimous decision. In the first fight, Durán put Pazienza down in Rounds 2 and 5, but referee Joe Cortez controversially ruled the Round 2 knockdown to be a slip. The first fight divided the people watching as some felt that Durán had won a close fight, but others felt that Pazienza had won either narrowly or widely after finishing strongly in the last five rounds. The second fight was more lopsided in Pazienza's favour, as despite the official judges giving Pazienza the win by scores of 116–112, 117–111 and 118–110, the TV commentators expressed puzzlement at the closeness of the official scoring as they thought that Pazienza had won every round in a 120–108 shutout.

In 1996, Durán fought Héctor Camacho for the vacant IBC Middleweight Championship. At the end of the fight, fans and TV commentators seemed in complete agreement that Durán had won the fight in an excellent performance, but the three judges saw the fight very differently and awarded Camacho the victory by a very controversial unanimous decision. Durán's old rival, Sugar Ray Leonard, commentating at ringside, was baffled at the scoring and called it an early Christmas gift for Camacho, with the result motivating Leonard enough to come out of a 6-year boxing retirement to face Camacho himself in 1997. In 1997, Durán was defeated by former champion Jorge Castro in Argentina. Durán then fought Castro in a rematch bout in Panama and won via unanimous decision, maintaining his unbeaten record in Panama.

In 1998, at the age of 47, he challenged 28-year-old WBA Middleweight Champion William Joppy. Joppy, a trim, quick-fisted fighter, battered Durán to defeat in just 3 rounds. It was Durán's most emphatic loss since the Hearns fight, over a decade earlier. Durán then announced his retirement for the third time in August 1998, but soon changed his mind and was back fighting in March 1999.

In June 2000, Durán avenged a previous loss to Pat Lawlor from 9 years before and won the NBA Super Middleweight Championship on his 49th birthday. He lost the title a year later to Héctor Camacho in a rematch bout and in what would be Durán's final fight.

== Retirement ==
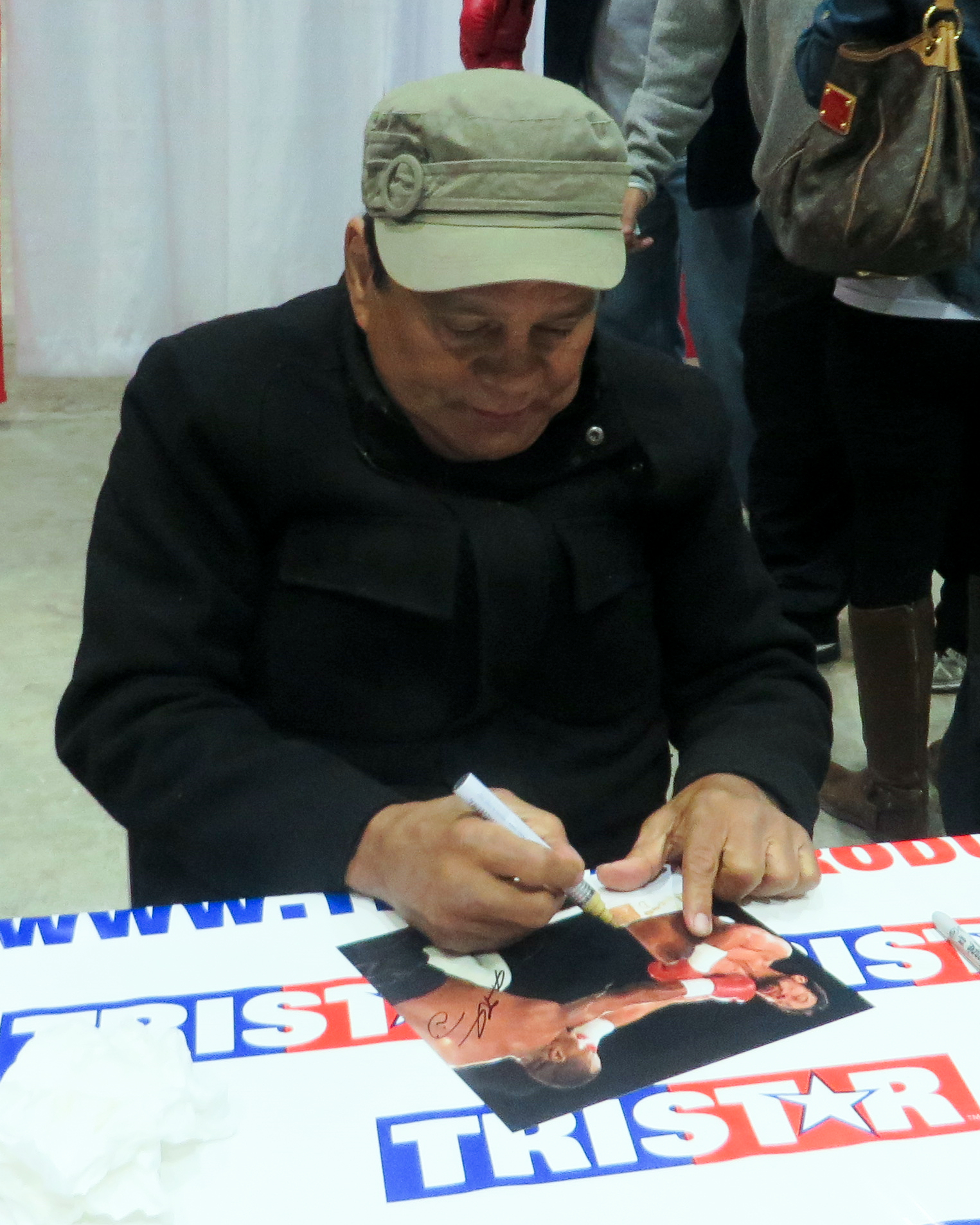
Durán signs autographs at a Houston sports collectors show in January 2014.

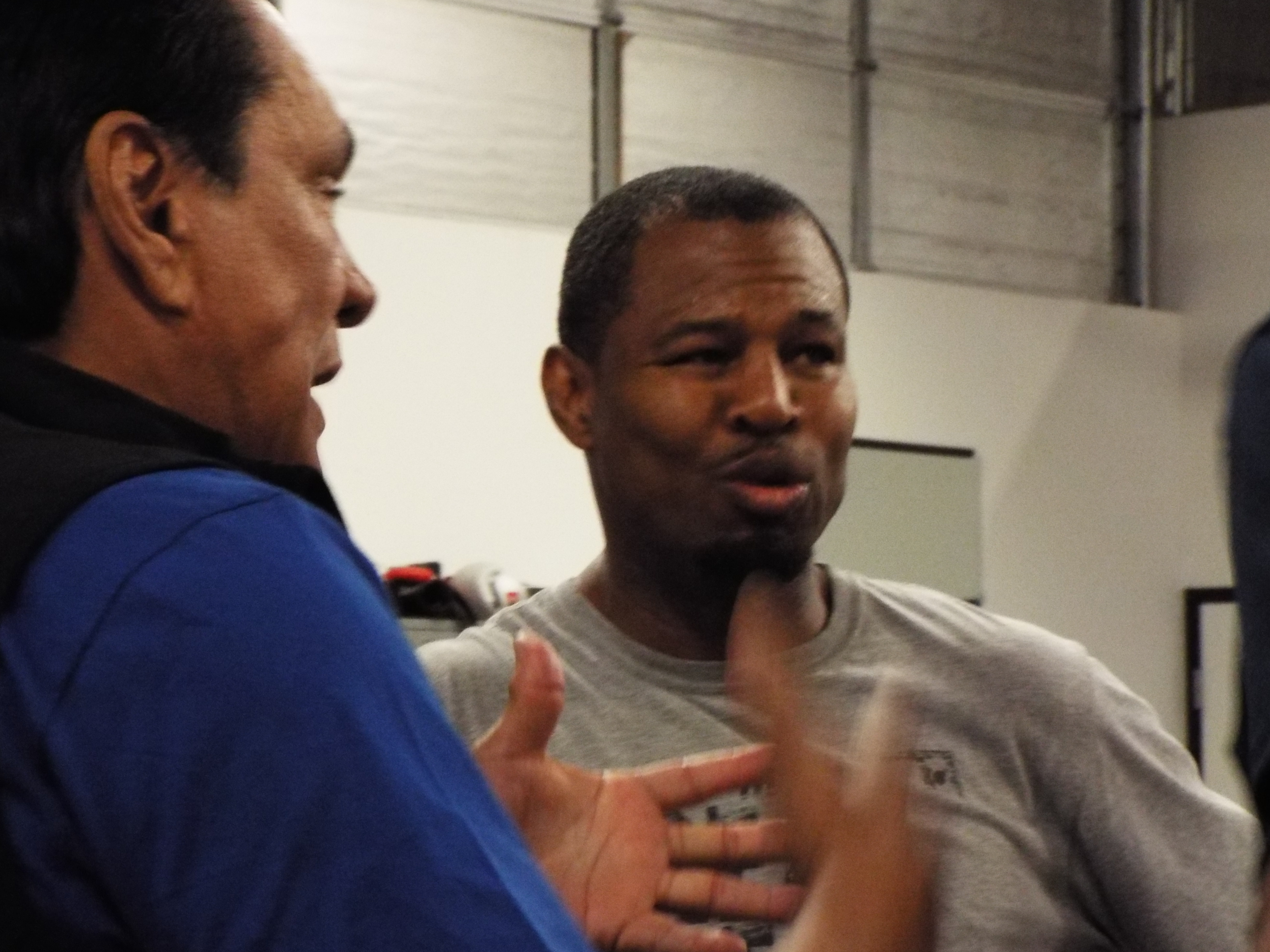
Durán training Shane Mosley for his fight against David Avanesyan, 2016

In October 2001, Durán traveled to Argentina to promote a salsa music CD that he had just released. While there, he was involved in a car crash and required life-saving surgery. After that incident, he announced his retirement from boxing at the age of 50.

Announcing his retirement, Durán cited the weight issues of his friend, Argentinian football legend Diego Maradona, as motivation for getting back in shape, stating "as of now, I am exercising so that when the [retirement] honors arrive the people will see me in shape. I don't want to [look] like Maradona did, all fat."

Durán's five world title belts, which he won in four different divisions, were stolen from his house in Panama in 1993 during a robbery allegedly staged by his brother-in-law, who gave them to memorabilia seller Luis González Báez, who stood trial for trying to sell stolen goods. González Báez allegedly sold the belts to undercover FBI agents. He alleged that Durán authorized the sale of the five belts to him during a time that Durán was facing financial trouble. On September 23, 2003, a federal judge in Florida ordered the five belts returned to Durán.

His 70 wins by knockout place him in an exclusive group of boxers who have won 50 or more fights by knockout. He is ranked number 28 on The Ring's list of 100 greatest punchers of all time.

On October 14, 2006, Durán was inducted into the World Boxing Hall of Fame in Riverside, California, and on June 10, 2007, into the International Boxing Hall of Fame in Canastota, New York.

In June 2020, Durán was diagnosed with COVID-19 after going to hospital with common cold symptoms. Durán underwent treatment for the disease. Coincidentally, the diagnosis came on the 48th anniversary of Durán's first world title victory against Ken Buchanan, which took place on June 26, 1972. He was released from the hospital weeks later.

Today he is the brand ambassador of Panama Blue, Panama's premium bottled water.

Durán is a licensed ultralight aircraft pilot in Panama. He flew a Quick Silver MX model.

Durán's daughter, Irichelle Durán, was a professional boxer herself who garnered a record of one win and two losses in three bouts, with one win by knockout. She is a resident of Puerto Rico.

In March 2024, it was revealed that Durán suffers a heart problem known as atrioventricular blockage, He had surgery on Monday 18 March in Panama to have a pacemaker placed in his chest.

== In media and popular culture ==
=== Film ===
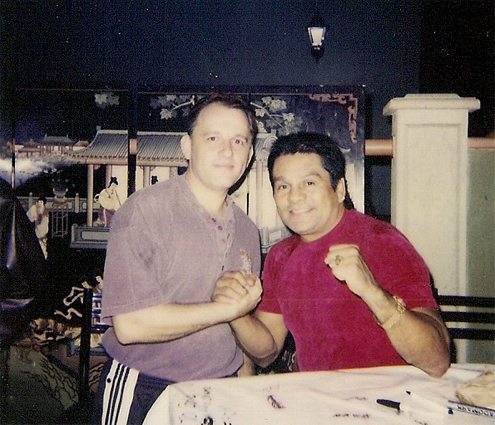
Durán (right) with writer Prvoslav Vujcic (left)

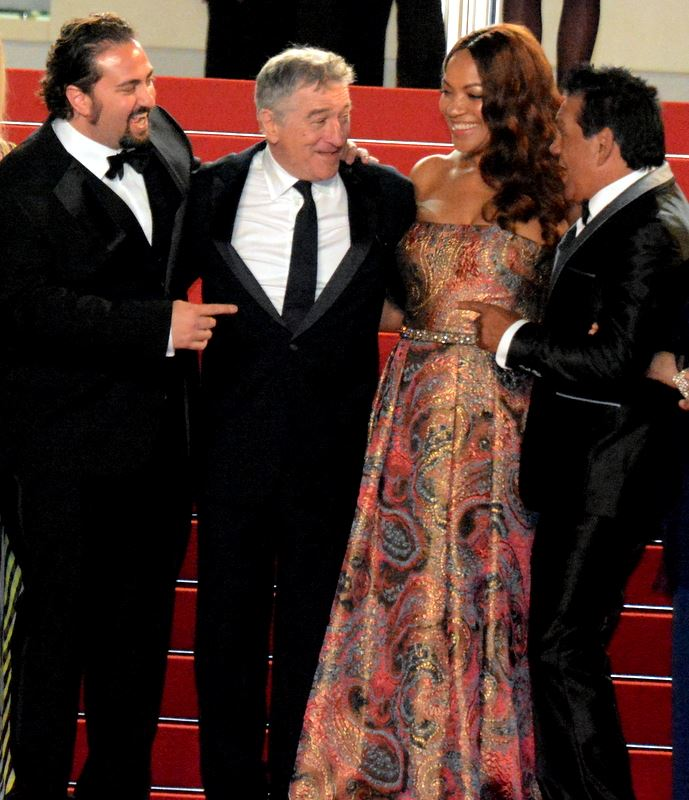
Durán (right) attending the screening of Hands of Stone at the 2016 Cannes Film Festival, with director Jonathan Jakubowicz, actor Robert De Niro and De Niro's wife Grace Hightower.

Durán's first appearance in a movie was in the 1979 film Rocky II as a lightning-fast sparring partner for Rocky Balboa. Outside of this, Durán had a minor role in Harlem Nights. Al Pacino was inspired by Durán in developing his characterization of Tony Montana in Scarface.

Durán's life and boxing career are told in the documentary Los puños de una nación ("The Fists of a Nation") by Panamanian filmmaker Pituka Ortega-Heilbron. Durán also appears very briefly during an interview for the documentary The Panama Deception (1992), in which he recounts his experience during the United States invasion of Panama.

The biopic Hands of Stone stars Édgar Ramírez as Durán, Robert De Niro as Ray Arcel and Usher as Sugar Ray Leonard, and was released on August 26, 2016.

The Kings Is a four part mini series, that shows rise of Roberto Durán, Marvelous Marvin Hagler, Thomas "The Hitman" Hearns, and Sugar Ray Leonard. That ushered in one of the greatest eras in boxing.

=== Television ===
Durán played the drug lord Jesús Maroto in Miami Vice season two, episode 19.

In "Corporate Warriors", the fourth episode of the second season of the hit American crime drama CSI: NY, Durán is mentioned by the medical examiner while discussing a dead man found to have bone grafts put in his hands to boost his punching power.

=== Music ===
The song "The Eyes of Roberto Durán" by Tom Russell, from the album The Long Way Around, contains the lyric, "Panama City – it's three in the morning; they're talking 'bout the Hands of Stone."

Durán is mentioned in the third verse of Nas' original demo for It Ain't Hard to Tell in the line: "Metaphors of murder man, hittin' like Roberto Durán, hold the mic in my hand, my lifespan."

The musician Jackie Leven recorded a song ("Museum of Childhood") that explores the events of the second world title fight between Durán and Sugar Ray Leonard.

Jazz musician Miles Davis, an avid boxing fan, recorded a tribute to Roberto Durán titled "Duran".

Durán is also mentioned in the third verse of Paul Thorn's "Hammer and Nail," based on Thorn's nationally televised fight with Durán:

I climbed in the ring with Roberto Durán and the punches began to rain down
He hit me with a dozen hard uppercuts and my corner threw in the towel
I asked him why he had to knock me out and he summed it up real well
He said, 'I'd rather be a hammer than a nail'

Texas rockabilly band Reverend Horton Heat mentions Durán in their song "Eat Steak," off of their album Smoke 'Em If You Got 'Em.

Durán is mentioned in the salsa song "Pa'l Bailador" by Colombian singer Joe Arroyo in 1989, "A Roberto Duran, Aya en Panama, Mano de Piedra!" (To Roberto Duran, in Panama, Hands of Stones!)

Durán is referenced multiple times in the song "Uno Mas" by Alex Soria's band Chino.

Durán's 1983 fight with Davey Moore is referenced in the 2014 single, "The Possum," by American songwriter, Sun Kil Moon (i.e. Mark Kozelek), who often writes about boxers. Kozelek sings: "They threw hard vicious guttural B-flats that shook their opponent / Like a tough Roberto "Hands of Stone" Durán, in the seventh round / Davey Moore, June 16, 1983..."

Durán himself was a Salsa singer once, leading an orchestra named "Felicidad" after his wife. They recorded albums and frequented television shows in Latin America.

Durán is also mentioned by former rap duo Max and Sam (consisting of sports analyst Max Kellerman and his brother Sam) in their song 'Young Man Rumble' with the line "Got skills got stamina got Hands of Stone like the champ from Panama."

Durán is indirectly referred to in Kevin Morby's song "This Is a Photograph", in which Morby's father's struggle with aging is likened to Durán's career, from his early bravado to the "No Más" fight against Sugar Ray Leonard.

Now time's the undefeated
The heavyweight champ
Laughing in his face
As it dances like Sugar Ray
Used to be, "C'mon, c'mon"
But now, "No mas, no mas"

== Professional boxing record ==
119 fights	103 wins	16 losses
By knockout	70	4
By decision	33	12

No.	Result	Record	Opponent	Type	Round, time	Date	Age	Location	Notes
119	Loss	103–16	Héctor Camacho	UD	12	Jul 14, 2001	50 years, 15 days	Pepsi Center, Denver, Colorado, U.S.	Lost NBA super middleweight title
118	Win	103–15	Patrick Goossen	UD	10	Aug 12, 2000	49 years, 57 days	Yakama Legends Casino, Toppenish, Washington, U.S.	
117	Win	102–15	Pat Lawlor	UD	12	Jun 16, 2000	49 years, 0 days	Gimnasio Nuevo Panama, Juan Díaz, Panama	Won NBA super middleweight title
116	Loss	101–15	Omar Gonzalez	UD	10	Mar 6, 1999	47 years, 263 days	Mar del Plata, Buenos Aires, Argentina	
115	Loss	101–14	William Joppy	TKO	3 (12), 2:54	Aug 28, 1998	47 years, 73 days	Las Vegas Hilton, Winchester, Nevada, U.S.	For WBA middleweight title
114	Win	101–13	Felix Jose Hernandez	UD	10	Jan 31, 1998	46 years, 229 days	Gimnasio Nuevo Panama, Panama City, Panama	
113	Win	100–13	David Radford	UD	8	Nov 15, 1997	46 years, 152 days	Carousel Casino, Hammanskraal, South Africa	
112	Win	99–13	Jorge Castro	UD	10	Jun 14, 1997	45 years, 363 days	Gimnasio Nuevo Panama, Panama City, Panama	
111	Loss	98–13	Jorge Castro	UD	10	Feb 15, 1997	45 years, 244 days	Mar del Plata, Argentina	
110	Win	98–12	Mike Culbert	TKO	6 (10), 2:24	Sep 27, 1996	45 years, 103 days	Mountaineer Casino Racetrack and Resort, Chester, West Virginia, U.S.	
109	Win	97–12	Ariel Cruz	KO	1 (10)	Aug 31, 1996	45 years, 76 days	Gimnasio Nuevo Panama, Panama City, Panama	
108	Loss	96–12	Héctor Camacho	UD	12	Jun 22, 1996	45 years, 6 days	Etess Arena, Atlantic City, New Jersey, U.S.	For vacant IBC middleweight title
107	Win	96–11	Ray Domenge	UD	10	Feb 20, 1996	44 years, 249 days	Mahi Shrine Auditorium, Miami, Florida, U.S.	
106	Win	95–11	Wilbur Garst	TKO	4 (10), 2:14	Dec 21, 1995	44 years, 188 days	War Memorial Auditorium, Fort Lauderdale, Florida, U.S.	
105	Win	94–11	Roni Martinez	TKO	7 (10), 2:59	Jun 10, 1995	43 years, 359 days	Municipal Auditorium, Kansas City, Missouri, U.S.	
104	Loss	93–11	Vinny Pazienza	UD	12	Jan 14, 1995	43 years, 212 days	Convention Hall, Atlantic City, New Jersey, U.S.	For IBC super middleweight title
103	Win	93–10	Heath Todd	TKO	6 (10), 3:00	Oct 18, 1994	43 years, 124 days	Casino Magic, Bay St. Louis, Mississippi, U.S.	
102	Loss	92–10	Vinny Pazienza	UD	12	Jun 25, 1994	43 years, 9 days	MGM Grand Garden Arena, Paradise, Nevada, U.S.	For vacant IBC super middleweight title
101	Win	92–9	Terry Thomas	TKO	4 (10), 1:02	Mar 29, 1994	42 years, 286 days	Casino Magic, Bay St. Louis, Mississippi, U.S.	
100	Win	91–9	Carlos Montero	UD	10	Feb 22, 1994	42 years, 251 days	Marseille, France	
99	Win	90–9	Tony Menefee	TKO	8 (10)	Dec 14, 1993	42 years, 181 days	Casino Magic, Bay St. Louis, Mississippi, U.S.	
98	Win	89–9	Sean Fitzgerald	KO	6 (10), 1:43	Aug 17, 1993	42 years, 62 days	Casino Magic, Bay St. Louis, Mississippi, U.S.	
97	Win	88–9	Jacques LeBlanc	UD	10	Jun 29, 1993	42 years, 13 days	Casino Magic, Bay St. Louis, Mississippi, U.S.	
96	Win	87–9	Ken Hulsey	KO	2 (10), 2:45	Dec 17, 1992	41 years, 184 days	CSU Convocation Center, Cleveland, Ohio, U.S.	
95	Win	86–9	Tony Biglen	UD	10	Sep 30, 1992	41 years, 106 days	Memorial Auditorium, Buffalo, New York, U.S.	
94	Loss	85–9	Pat Lawlor	TKO	6 (10), 1:50	Mar 18, 1991	39 years, 275 days	The Mirage, Paradise, Nevada, U.S.	
93	Loss	85–8	Sugar Ray Leonard	UD	12	Dec 7, 1989	38 years, 174 days	The Mirage, Paradise, Nevada, U.S.	For WBC super middleweight title
92	Win	85–7	Iran Barkley	SD	12	Feb 24, 1989	37 years, 253 days	Convention Hall, Atlantic City, New Jersey, U.S.	Won WBC middleweight title
91	Win	84–7	Jeff Lanas	SD	10	Oct 1, 1988	37 years, 107 days	International Amphitheatre, Chicago, Illinois, U.S.	
90	Win	83–7	Paul Thorn	RTD	6 (10), 3:00	Apr 14, 1988	36 years, 303 days	Tropicana, Atlantic City, New Jersey, U.S.	
89	Win	82–7	Ricky Stackhouse	UD	10	Feb 5, 1988	36 years, 234 days	Convention Hall, Atlantic City, New Jersey, U.S.	
88	Win	81–7	Juan Carlos Giménez	UD	10	Sep 12, 1987	36 years, 88 days	James L. Knight Convention Center, Miami Beach, Florida, U.S.	
87	Win	80–7	Victor Claudio	UD	10	May 16, 1987	35 years, 334 days	Convention Center, Miami Beach, Florida, U.S.	
86	Loss	79–7	Robbie Sims	SD	10	Jun 23, 1986	35 years, 7 days	Caesars Palace, Paradise, Nevada, U.S.	
85	Win	79–6	Jorge Suero	KO	2 (10), 1:45	Apr 18, 1986	34 years, 306 days	Gimnasio Nuevo Panama, Panama City, Panama	
84	Win	78–6	Manuel Zambrano	KO	2 (10), 2:57	Jan 31, 1986	34 years, 229 days	Gimnasio Nuevo Panama, Panama City, Panama	
83	Loss	77–6	Thomas Hearns	KO	2 (12), 1:05	Jun 15, 1984	32 years, 365 days	Caesars Palace, Paradise, Nevada, U.S.	For WBC super welterweight title
82	Loss	77–5	Marvelous Marvin Hagler	UD	15	Nov 10, 1983	32 years, 147 days	Caesars Palace, Paradise, Nevada, U.S.	For WBA, WBC, IBF, and The Ring middleweight titles
81	Win	77–4	Davey Moore	TKO	8 (15), 2:02	Jun 16, 1983	32 years, 0 days	Madison Square Garden, New York City, New York, U.S.	Won WBA super welterweight title
80	Win	76–4	José Cuevas	TKO	4 (12), 2:26	Jan 29, 1983	31 years, 227 days	Memorial Sports Arena, Los Angeles, California, U.S.	
79	Win	75–4	Jimmy Batten	UD	10	Nov 12, 1982	31 years, 149 days	Orange Bowl, Miami, Florida, U.S.	
78	Loss	74–4	Kirkland Laing	SD	10	Sep 4, 1982	31 years, 80 days	Cobo Hall, Detroit, Michigan, U.S.	
77	Loss	74–3	Wilfred Benítez	UD	15	Jan 30, 1982	30 years, 228 days	Caesars Palace, Paradise, Nevada, U.S.	For WBC super welterweight title
76	Win	74–2	Luigi Minchillo	UD	10	Sep 26, 1981	30 years, 102 days	Caesars Palace, Paradise, Nevada, U.S.	
75	Win	73–2	Nino Gonzalez	UD	10	Aug 9, 1981	30 years, 54 days	Public Auditorium, Cleveland, Ohio, U.S.	
74	Loss	72–2	Sugar Ray Leonard	TKO	8 (15), 2:44	Nov 25, 1980	29 years, 162 days	Superdome, New Orleans, Louisiana, U.S.	Lost WBC and The Ring welterweight titles
73	Win	72–1	Sugar Ray Leonard	UD	15	Jun 20, 1980	29 years, 4 days	Olympic Stadium, Montreal, Quebec, Canada	Won WBC and The Ring welterweight titles
72	Win	71–1	Wellington Wheatley	TKO	6 (10)	Feb 24, 1980	28 years, 253 days	Tropicana Las Vegas, Paradise, Nevada, U.S.	
71	Win	70–1	Joseph Nsubuga	RTD	4 (10), 3:00	Jan 13, 1980	28 years, 211 days	Caesars Palace, Paradise, Nevada, U.S.	
70	Win	69–1	Zeferino Gonzalez	UD	10	Sep 28, 1979	28 years, 104 days	Caesars Palace, Paradise, Nevada, U.S.	
69	Win	68–1	Carlos Palomino	UD	10	Jun 22, 1979	28 years, 6 days	Madison Square Garden, New York City, New York, U.S.	
68	Win	67–1	Jimmy Heair	UD	10	Apr 8, 1979	28 years, 53 days	Caesars Palace, Paradise, Nevada, U.S.	
67	Win	66–1	Monroe Brooks	KO	8 (12), 1:59	Dec 8, 1978	27 years, 175 days	Madison Square Garden, New York City, New York, U.S.	
66	Win	65–1	Ezequiel Obando	KO	2 (10), 1:09	Sep 1, 1978	27 years, 77 days	Gimnasio Nuevo Panama, Panama City, Panama	
65	Win	64–1	Adolfo Viruet	UD	10	Apr 27, 1978	26 years, 315 days	Madison Square Garden, New York City, New York, U.S.	
64	Win	63–1	Esteban de Jesús	TKO	12 (15), 2:32	Jan 21, 1978	26 years, 219 days	Caesars Palace, Paradise, Nevada, U.S.	Retained WBA and The Ring lightweight titles; Won WBC lightweight title
63	Win	62–1	Edwin Viruet	UD	15	Sep 17, 1977	26 years, 93 days	Spectrum, Philadelphia, Pennsylvania, U.S.	Retained WBA and The Ring lightweight titles
62	Win	61–1	Bernardo Diaz	KO	1 (10), 1:29	Aug 6, 1977	26 years, 51 days	Gimnasio Nuevo Panama, Panama City, Panama	
61	Win	60–1	Javier Muniz	UD	10	May 16, 1977	25 years, 334 days	Capital Centre, Landover, Maryland, U.S.	
60	Win	59–1	Vilomar Fernandez	KO	13 (15), 2:10	Jan 29, 1977	25 years, 227 days	Fontainbleau, Miami Beach, Florida, U.S.	Retained WBA and The Ring lightweight titles
59	Win	58–1	Alvaro Rojas	KO	1 (15), 2:17	Oct 15, 1976	25 years, 121 days	Sportatorium, Pembroke Pines, Florida, U.S.	Retained WBA and The Ring lightweight titles
58	Win	57–1	Emiliano Villa	TKO	7 (10), 2:00	Jul 31, 1976	25 years, 45 days	Gimnasio Nuevo Panama, Panama City, Panama	
57	Win	56–1	Lou Bizzarro	KO	14 (15), 2:15	May 23, 1976	24 years, 342 days	County Field House, Erie, Pennsylvania, U.S.	Retained WBA and The Ring lightweight titles
56	Win	55–1	Saoul Mamby	UD	10	May 4, 1976	24 years, 323 days	Miami Beach, Florida, U.S.	
55	Win	54–1	Leoncio Ortiz	KO	15 (15), 2:39	Dec 20, 1975	24 years, 187 days	Roberto Clemente Coliseum, San Juan, Puerto Rico	Retained WBA and The Ring lightweight titles
54	Win	53–1	Edwin Viruet	UD	10	Sep 30, 1975	24 years, 106 days	Nassau Veterans Memorial Coliseum, Hempstead, New York, U.S.	
53	Win	52–1	Alirio Acuna	KO	3 (10)	Sep 13, 1975	24 years, 89 days	Gimnasio Jose D. Crespo, Chitré, Panama	
52	Win	51–1	Pepe El Toro	KO	1 (10), 2:00	Aug 2, 1975	24 years, 47 days	Roberto Clemente Stadium, Managua, Nicaragua	
51	Win	50–1	Jose Peterson	TKO	1 (10), 1:02	Jun 3, 1975	23 years, 352 days	Convention Center, Miami Beach, Florida, U.S.	
50	Win	49–1	Ray Lampkin	KO	14 (15), 0:39	Mar 2, 1975	23 years, 259 days	Gimnasio Nuevo Panama, Panama City, Panama	Retained WBA and The Ring lightweight titles
49	Win	48–1	Andres Salgado	KO	1 (10), 1:00	Feb 15, 1975	23 years, 244 days	Gimnasio Nuevo Panama, Panama City, Panama	
48	Win	47–1	Masataka Takayama	KO	1 (15), 1:40	Dec 21, 1974	23 years, 188 days	Plaza de Toros El Zapote, San José, Costa Rica	Retained WBA and The Ring lightweight titles
47	Win	46–1	Adalberto Vanegas	KO	1 (10)	Nov 16, 1974	23 years, 153 days	Gimnasio Nuevo Panama, Panama City, Panama	
46	Win	45–1	Jose Vasquez	KO	2 (10)	Oct 31, 1974	23 years, 137 days	Gimnasio Eddie Cortez, San José, Costa Rica	
45	Win	44–1	Hector Matta	UD	10	Sep 2, 1974	23 years, 78 days	Roberto Clemente Coliseum, San Juan, Puerto Rico	
44	Win	43–1	Flash Gallego	TKO	7 (10), 2:35	Jul 6, 1974	23 years, 20 days	Gimnasio Nuevo Panama, Panama City, Panama	
43	Win	42–1	Esteban de Jesús	KO	11 (15), 1:11	Mar 16, 1974	22 years, 273 days	Gimnasio Nuevo Panama, Panama City, Panama	Retained WBA and The Ring lightweight titles
42	Win	41–1	Armando Mendoza	TKO	3 (10), 1:50	Feb 16, 1974	22 years, 245 days	Gimnasio Nuevo Panama, Panama City, Panama	
41	Win	40–1	Leonard Tavarez	TKO	4 (10)	Jan 21, 1974	22 years, 219 days	Palais des Sports, Paris, France	
40	Win	39–1	Tony Garcia	KO	3 (10)	Dec 1, 1973	22 years, 168 days	Gimnasio Escuela Normal, Santiago de Veraguas, Panama	
39	Win	38–1	Guts Ishimatsu	TKO	10 (15), 2:10	Sep 8, 1973	22 years, 84 days	Gimnasio Nuevo Panama, Panama City, Panama	Retained WBA and The Ring lightweight titles
38	Win	37–1	Doc McClendon	UD	10	Aug 4, 1973	22 years, 49 days	Roberto Clemente Coliseum, San Juan, Puerto Rico	
37	Win	36–1	Hector Thompson	TKO	8 (15), 2:15	Jun 2, 1973	21 years, 351 days	Gimnasio Nuevo Panama, Panama City, Panama	Retained WBA and The Ring lightweight titles
36	Win	35–1	Gerardo Ferrat	TKO	2 (10), 2:45	Apr 14, 1973	21 years, 302 days	Gimnasio Nuevo Panama, Panama City, Panama	
35	Win	34–1	Javier Ayala	UD	10	Mar 17, 1973	21 years, 274 days	Memorial Sports Arena, Los Angeles, California, U.S.	
34	Win	33–1	Juan Medina	TKO	7 (10), 1:22	Feb 22, 1973	21 years, 251 days	Grand Olympic Auditorium, Los Angeles, California, U.S.	
33	Win	32–1	Jimmy Robertson	KO	5 (15)	Jan 20, 1973	21 years, 218 days	Gimnasio Nuevo Panama, Panama City, Panama	Retained WBA and The Ring lightweight titles
32	Loss	31–1	Esteban de Jesús	UD	10	Nov 17, 1972	21 years, 154 days	Madison Square Garden, New York City, New York, U.S.	
31	Win	31–0	Lupe Ramirez	KO	1 (10), 3:03	Oct 28, 1972	21 years, 134 days	Gimnasio Nuevo Panama, Panama City, Panama	
30	Win	30–0	Greg Potter	KO	1 (10), 1:58	Sep 2, 1972	21 years, 78 days	Gimnasio Nuevo Panama, Panama City, Panama	
29	Win	29–0	Ken Buchanan	TKO	13 (15)	Jun 26, 1972	21 years, 10 days	Madison Square Garden, New York City, New York, U.S.	Won WBA and The Ring lightweight titles
28	Win	28–0	Francisco Munoz	TKO	1 (10), 2:34	Mar 10, 1972	20 years, 268 days	Gimnasio Nuevo Panama, Panama City, Panama	
27	Win	27–0	Angel Robinson Garcia	UD	10	Jan 15, 1972	20 years, 213 days	Gimnasio Nuevo Panama, Panama City, Panama	
26	Win	26–0	Hiroshi Kobayashi	KO	7 (10), 0:30	Oct 16, 1971	20 years, 122 days	Gimnasio Nuevo Panama, Panama City, Panama	
25	Win	25–0	Benny Huertas	TKO	1 (10), 1:06	Sep 13, 1971	20 years, 89 days	Madison Square Garden, New York City, New York, U.S.	
24	Win	24–0	Fermin Soto	TKO	3 (10)	Jul 18, 1971	20 years, 32 days	Monterrey, Mexico	
23	Win	23–0	Lloyd Marshall	TKO	6 (10), 1:37	May 29, 1971	19 years, 347 days	Gimnasio Nuevo Panama, Panama City, Panama	
22	Win	22–0	Jose Acosta	KO	1 (10), 1:55	Mar 21, 1971	19 years, 278 days	Gimnasio Nuevo Panama, Panama City, Panama	
21	Win	21–0	Jose Angel Herrera	KO	6 (10)	Jan 10, 1971	19 years, 208 days	Toreo, Monterrey, Mexico	
20	Win	20–0	Ignacio Castaneda	TKO	3 (10)	Oct 18, 1970	19 years, 124 days	Gimnasio Nuevo Panamá, Panama City, Panama	
19	Win	19–0	Marvin Castaneda	KO	1 (10), 1:30	Sep 5, 1970	19 years, 81 days	Gimnasio Municipal, Puerto Armuelles, Panama	
18	Win	18–0	Clemente Mucino	KO	6 (10), 2:18	Jul 18, 1970	19 years, 32 days	Arena de Colón, Colón, Panama	
17	Win	17–0	Ernesto Marcel	TKO	10 (10)	May 16, 1970	18 years, 334 days	Gimnasio Nuevo Panama, Panama City, Panama	
16	Win	16–0	Felipe Torres	UD	10	Mar 28, 1970	18 years, 285 days	Mexico City, Mexico	
15	Win	15–0	Luis Patino	KO	8 (10)	Nov 23, 1969	18 years, 160 days	Gimnasio Neco de la Guardia, Panama City, Panama	
14	Win	14–0	Serafin Garcia	TKO	5 (8)	Sep 21, 1969	18 years, 97 days	Gimnasio Neco de la Guardia, Panama City, Panama	
13	Win	13–0	Adolfo Osses	TKO	7 (8)	Jun 22, 1969	18 years, 6 days	Gimnasio Neco de la Guardia, Panama City, Panama	
12	Win	12–0	Jacinto Garcia	TKO	4 (8)	May 18, 1969	17 years, 336 days	Gimnasio Neco de la Guardia, Panama City, Panama	
11	Win	11–0	Eduardo Frutos	UD	6	Feb 1, 1969	17 years, 230 days	Estadio Nacional, Panama City, Panama	
10	Win	10–0	Alberto Brand	TKO	4 (6), 2:50	Jan 19, 1969	17 years, 217 days	Gimnasio Neco de la Guardia, Panama City, Panama	
9	Win	9–0	Carlos Howard	TKO	1 (6)	Dec 7, 1968	17 years, 174 days	Gimnasio Neco de la Guardia, Panama City, Panama	
8	Win	8–0	Juan Gondola	KO	2 (6)	Nov 16, 1968	17 years, 153 days	Arena de Colón, Colón, Panama	
7	Win	7–0	Cesar De Leon	KO	1 (6), 1:20	Sep 22, 1968	17 years, 98 days	Gimnasio Neco de la Guardia, Panama City, Panama	
6	Win	6–0	Leroy Carghill	KO	1 (6)	Aug 25, 1968	17 years, 70 days	Gimnasio Neco de la Guardia, Panama City, Panama	
5	Win	5–0	Enrique Jacobo	KO	1 (6)	Aug 10, 1968	17 years, 55 days	Panama City, Panama	
4	Win	4–0	Eduardo Morales	KO	1 (4), 3:00	Jun 30, 1968	17 years, 14 days	Gimnasio Neco de la Guardia, Panama City, Panama	
3	Win	3–0	Manuel Jimenez	KO	1 (4)	Jun 15, 1968	16 years, 365 days	Arena de Colón, Colón, Panama	
2	Win	2–0	Juan Gondola	KO	1 (4)	May 14, 1968	16 years, 333 days	Colón, Panama	
1	Win	1–0	Carlos Mendoza	UD	4	Feb 23, 1968	16 years, 252 days	Arena de Colón, Colón, Panama	

== Exhibition boxing record ==
1 fight	0 wins	0 losses
Non-scored	1	

No.	Result	Record	Opponent	Type	Round, time	Date	Age	Location	Notes
1	—N/a	0–0 (1)	Danny Morgan	—N/a	3	Aug 14, 1989	38 years, 59 days	Lawlor Events Center, Reno, Nevada, U.S.	Non-scored bout; Durán was wearing a headgear

== Titles in boxing ==
=== Major world titles ===
- WBA lightweight champion (135 lbs)
- WBC lightweight champion (135 lbs)
- WBC welterweight champion (147 lbs)
- WBA super welterweight champion (154 lbs)
- WBC middleweight champion (160 lbs)

=== The Ring magazine titles ===
- The Ring lightweight champion (135 lbs)
- The Ring welterweight champion (147 lbs)

=== Minor world titles ===
- NBA super middleweight champion (168 lbs)

=== Undisputed titles ===
- Undisputed lightweight champion

== See also ==
- List of undisputed boxing champions
- List of boxing families
- List of boxing quadruple champions
- List of Panamanians

== Bibliography ==
- Giudice, Christian (2006). Hands of Stone: The Life and Legend of Roberto Durán. Milo Books. ISBN 1-903854-55-5.

Sporting positions
World boxing titles
Preceded by Ken Buchanan	WBA lightweight champion June 26, 1972 – February 2, 1979; Vacated	Vacant Title next held by Ernesto España
Preceded by Ken Buchanan	The Ring lightweight champion June 26, 1972 – 1979; Vacated	Vacant Title next held by Jim Watt
Preceded by Esteban De Jesús	WBC lightweight champion January 21, 1978 – February 7, 1979; Vacated	Vacant Title next held by Jim Watt
Vacant Title last held by Ken Buchanan	Undisputed lightweight champion January 21, 1978 – February 2, 1979; Titles fragmented	Vacant Title next held by Pernell Whitaker
Preceded by Sugar Ray Leonard	WBC welterweight champion June 20, 1980 – November 25, 1980	Succeeded by Sugar Ray Leonard
Preceded by Sugar Ray Leonard	The Ring welterweight champion June 20, 1980 – November 25, 1980	Succeeded by Sugar Ray Leonard
Preceded by Davey Moore	WBA super welterweight champion June 16, 1983 – June 15, 1984; Stripped	Vacant Title next held by Mike McCallum
Preceded by Iran Barkley	WBC middleweight champion February 24, 1989 – January 11, 1990; Vacated	Vacant Title next held by Julian Jackson
Awards
Previous: Bobby Chacon	The Ring Comeback of the Year; 1983	Next: Marvin Johnson
Previous: Tony Lopez vs. Rocky Lockridge	The Ring Fight of the Year vs. Iran Barkley; 1989	Next: Julio César Chávez vs. Meldrick Taylor
Preceded by Michael Dokes	The Ring Comeback of the Year; 1989	Succeeded by Tony Lopez
Quadruple weight status
Preceded by Sugar Ray Leonard	Oldest living world champion February 24, 1989 – present	Incumbent
Triple weight status
Preceded by Emile Griffith	Oldest living world champion July 23, 2013 – present	Incumbent
Middleweight status
Preceded by Nino Benvenuti	Oldest living world champion May 20, 2025 – present	Incumbent
