= Edwin Viruet =

Puerto Rican-American boxer

Personal information
- Nationality: Puerto Rico
- Born: Edwin Viruet; 20 August 1950 (age 75) Arecibo, Puerto Rico
- Height: 5 ft 8 in (173 cm)
- Weight: Lightweight

Boxing career
- Reach: 71″

Boxing record
- Total fights: 39
- Wins: 31
- Win by KO: 14
- Losses: 6
- Draws: 2

Edwin Viruet (born 20 August 1950 in New York) is a retired professional boxer from Puerto Rico. His brother Adolfo was also a professional boxer.

Viruet made his professional debut in 1969. Among his early opponents were Saoul Mamby, a future world light-welterweight champion, against whom he earned a draw; and Alfredo Escalera, a future world super featherweight champion, against whom he won a decision. Viruet also defeated Vilomar Fernandez.

In 1975, Viruet was matched with Roberto Durán, the reigning world lightweight champion, in a non-title fight. Viruet lost by a unanimous decision. Two years later he fought Durán again, this time with Durán's world title on the line, and again lost a unanimous decision.

Viruet continued to fight top contenders, losing to Esteban De Jesús and Edwin Rosario but defeating Josue Marquez by tenth round knockout. He finally retired in 1983.

== Academy ==
As of 2024, Viruet ran the Edwin Viruet Boxing academy in the Bronx.
