= Ray Lampkin =

American boxer (1947–2026)

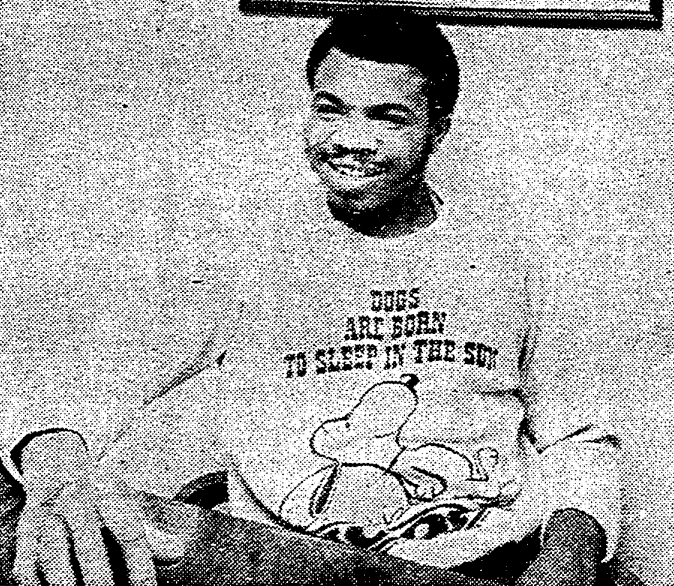
Lampkin in 1974

Ray Lampkin Jr. (November 18, 1947 – June 2, 2026) was an American professional boxer who lost a 1975 World Boxing Association (WBA) lightweight title fight to Roberto Durán in Panama. Lampkin lasted fourteen rounds against the hard-hitting Duran.

== Biography ==
Lampkin was born in Ward County, Texas, on November 18, 1947, and grew up in Portland, Oregon.

He won the North American Boxing Federation lightweight title fight but later lost it against Esteban de Jesús at the Felt Forum in New York City. He finished his career with a total of 35 wins (16 by knock out), six losses (two by knock out), and one draw. Lampkin was inducted into the Oregon Sports Hall of Fame.

Lampkin died in Portland, Oregon on June 2, 2026, at the age of 78.
