= Antonio Amaya (boxer) =

Panamanian boxer and singer (1945–2025)

Personal information
- Nationality: Panamanian
- Born: 1945 Colon, Panama
- Died: January 16, 2025

Boxing career
- Weight class: Featherweight, Junior Lightweight

Boxing record
- Total fights: 77
- Wins: 48
- Win by KO: 10
- Losses: 22

Antonio "El Buchi" Amaya Góndola (1945 – 26 January 2025) was a Panamanian professional boxer in the Junior Lightweight division and professional singer. In 1969, 1970 and 1974, he came very close to winning a world title in world championship fights, and as a consequence, was later nicknamed as an "uncrowned champion" by some critics and experts. Amaya died on 26 January 2025, at the age of 79.

The World Boxing Association described Amaya as an "honorary world champion". He was a member of the music band, Los Morenos Alegres de Colon, whose "The Happy Black People of Colon" song became a hit and who were widely recognised in Panama with a song named after him, "Amaya Sufre del Córazon" ("Amaya Has a Broken Heart").

Amaya was trained by Isaac Kresh, who was also the trainer of Ismael Laguna, Ernesto Marcel and Enrique Pinder, among others.

== Career ==
Amaya represented Panama at the 1963 Pan American Games boxing competition in Brazil. He contested in 77 professional fights held in 14 countries. His manager was Carlos Eleta.

Amaya debuted as a professional on 18 August 1963, when he defeated Herbert Locke by a third-round knockout at the Gimnasio Neco de la Guardia in Panama City. Amaya won his first ten contests, including a fifth-round disqualification victory against Federico Bell on 19 April 1964 at Gimnasio Nacional in a rematch between him and Bell.

On 9 August 1963, Amaya suffered the first blemish on his professional record, when held to a ten-rounds draw (tie) by another Panamanian prospect of the time, the hard-hitting Carlos Rios, who had a record of ten wins and two losses with all ten wins by knockout, in a fight that was held at the Gimnasio Nacional in Panama City, as the main event of the day's boxing show there.

Amaya won his next contest after meeting Rios, and then, in November 1964 traveled to Venezuela for his first fight abroad, which was held on 16 November 1964, against Cesar Castillo, a prospect with 5 wins and 2 losses, in Maracaibo. Amaya tasted defeat as a professional for the first time, being deemed a loser by decision after ten rounds of fighting.

Amaya had better luck in his next fight, as he contested Carlos Rios in a rematch, this time for the Panamanian Featherweight title, on 20 December 1964, at the Estadio Olimpico ("Olympic Stadium") in Panama City. Amaya won the title when he scored a rare (for him) knockout win, winning in the fifth round. This was one of only ten knockout wins that Amaya amassed in 77 professional fights.

On 24 July 1965, Amaya would face Argentine Carlos Cañete, himself also a future world championship challenger. The pair boxed to a ten rounds draw at the Luna Park Stadium in Buenos Aires. Cañete had won 39 and lost 2 and drawn 1 of his 42 contests when he and Amaya duly met.

Amaya followed the draw with Caňete by winning nine bouts in a row. Included among these was a win over world ranked Rafiu King, his Asian debut with a fight in the Philippines, his first contest to take place in Mexico and various defenses of his national Featherweight championship.

During his second contest in Mexico, Amaya drew on 17 December 1966 with Mario Diaz, who had won 41, lost 9 and drawn 1 of his fifty one bouts, at Toreo de Cuatro Caminos bullring in Mexico City, to stop his nine-fight winning streak in the main event of a program that also featured a fight by the legendary Cuban-Mexican, International Boxing Hall of Fame member and multiple times world champion Jose Napoles. But Amaya immediately began a new streak, which reached five, including a win over future world champion Rene Barrientos, beaten by ten rounds decision on 22 July 1967 in Panama City. All five of those wins were on points over ten rounds, with two coming in Mexico, two in Caracas, Venezuela and the Barrientos one in Panama.

Amaya had back to back losses, outpointed by José Jimenez and by Barrientos in a rematch, (which Panamanian boxing writers of the era considered a "robbery" against Amaya) before embarking on another three-fight win streak. This included two wins over the world-ranked Puerto Rican, Frankie Narvaez, one time at the Madison Square Garden in New York, New York, constituting Amaya's debut as a professional boxer in the United States on 20 August 1968 and the second time on their rematch, which also constituted Amaya's debut in a foreign country as a professional boxer, since it was held at the Hiram Bithorn Stadium in San Juan, Puerto Rico, Amaya winning in Puerto Rico on 23 September of the same year. Both contests with Narvaez were ten-rounds decision wins for Amaya, who was then ranked among the top Junior Lightweights of the world by the World Boxing Association.

=== First world title fight ===
On 4 April 1969, Amaya faced Hiroshi Kobayashi, the Japanese WBA world Junior Lightweight champion, for the local boxer's world title, at Tokyo, Japan. In what the New York Times described as a "free swinging" fifteen-rounds bout, Amaya lost a very close, split decision.

This is the bout that garnered Amaya the moniker of "uncrowned champion". Kobayashi himself later admitted, after the contest, that he thought the fair scoring would have been a draw, as he told the Associated Press.

=== Second world title fight ===
Amaya won four more fights, all on points, including one over Raimundo Dias on 20 October 1969 at the Madison Square Garden in New York, before the long- awaited for rematch with Kobayashi was set. On 23 August 1970, at Korakuen Hall in Tokyo, their rematch took place, once again, for the WBA"s world Junior Lightweight title. In an extremely close affair, Kobayashi was again deemed winner, this time by a unanimous decision, with the scoring of 72–71 by referee Nick Pope, 73–71 by judge Takeo Ugo and 72–69 by judge Yusaku Yoshida. Notably, two of the scorers in this match were Japanese like the champion, giving rise to more rumors that Amaya had been, once again, robbed of a world championship. However the United States referee Nick Pope and the Associated Press scored the bout in favour of Kobayashi.

=== Moving on ===
Amaya kept busy with matches against important rivals after the Kobayashi defeats. Right after the Kobayashi rematch, Amaya met Nigerian contender Ray Adigun on 18 October 1970 at the Gimnasio Nuevo Panama (now known as "Roberto Duran Arena", named after legendary boxer Roberto Duran). The Adigun fight was a rarity in Amaya's career, as the two contenders boxed until the sixth-round, with Amaya deemed a winner by technical knockout. This was the main event of a show in which Duran himself participated, with Duran knocking out Ignacio Castaneda in the third round.

That win was followed by a trip to Costa Rica, where Amaya faced world-ranked Isaac Marin on 12 November 1970, pulling a ten-rounds decision vixtory at the Gimnasio Nacional Eddy Cortes in San Jose.

The win over Marin was followed by what was possibly Amaya's best win, when he faced former world champion and future International Boxing Hall of Fame member Ultiminio Ramos at the Plaza de Toros Monumental in Monterrey, Mexico, on a card headlined by a Duran fight, on 10 January 1971. Amaya won this contest on points after ten rounds.

After another win, this time over rival Eduardo Moreno in Costa Rica, Amaya traveled again to Monterrey, Mexico, to face Chango Carmona, a hard-hitting, future World Boxing Council world Lightweight champion, on 19 June 1971. Amaya dropped the Mexican in round three, but lost the contest via a seventh-round technical knockout.

Amaya more or less took on the shape of a boxing journeyman career-wise after the loss to Carmona, winning six, losing four and drawing one of his next eleven fights. But those fights included one against William Martinez on 10 October 1971 at Costa Rica where Amaya was stopped in round three with a broken jaw, one against Rocky Orengo at the Roberto Clemente Coliseum in San Juan, Puerto Rico, on 4 October 1973, with Amaya winning by ten-rounds decision, one against future Roberto Duran world title challenger Alvaro Rojas in Costa Rica, in which Amaya beat the hometown favorite by a close but unanimous (98–93–98–97 and 98–94) ten-rounds decision on 18 October 1973, and a November 12, 1973 bout against future WBC world Junior Lightweight champion Alfredo Escalera at the Clemente Coliseum in San Juan, which he lost by ten-rounds unanimous decision. Despite being more or less of a journeyman at this point in his career, one more world title try remained in Amaya's future.

=== Third world championship fight ===
History repeated itself when Amaya returned to Japan to again challenge for a world title, this time the WBC world Junior Lightweight (Super Featherweight) title against world champion Kuniaki Shibata, on 27 June 1974. Shibata and Amaya fought a very close contest, with Shibata retaining the title with a very close (73–70, 72–71, 70–70) majority decision, giving rise to more concerns that Amaya was, once again, robbed of a world championship by judges in Japan.

=== Rest of career ===
Amaya's descent into journeyman status accelerated after his third failed attempt at a world title, losing ten of his last seventeen contests, with four wins and three draws. Among those he faced were Miguel Montilla (a ten-rounds unanimous decision loss at Santo Domingo, Dominican Republic on 17 February 1975) and Vilomar Fernandez (another ten-rounds decision loss at Santo Domingo, on 28 April of the same year). He also lost to future Samuel Serrano world title challengers Nkosana Mgxaji (by ten-rounds decision on 21 June 1975 in East London, South Africa) and Alberto Herrera (ten-rounds decision on 28 November 1975 at Guayaquil, Ecuador) as well as to Alexis Arguello world title challenger, fellow Panamanian Diego Alcala.

The last professional boxing victory recorded by Amaya was against prospect José Salazar, who had won seven of his nine fights with a loss and a draw, to successfully defend his Panamanian national Junior Lightweight title, on 29 April 1978 in Colon. His last fight was against future WBC world Junior Welterweight title challenger, Argentina's Juan José Gimenez in a bout Amaya lost by a sixth-round technical knockout on 9 June. 1978 in Milan, Italy.

== Professional boxing record ==
Amaya had 77 bouts, of which he won 48, lost 22 and tied 7. He had a total of 10 knockout wins and 8 knockout losses in his professional boxing career.

== Personal ==
Amaya was the uncle of Panamanian world champion boxer Celestino Caballero.

== Later life ==
During 2006, Amaya met old rival Kuniaki Shibata and former WBA world featherweight champion Ernesto Marcel, this time on friendly terms, at a Panama City restaurant.

== Legacy ==
Amaya is well regarded by Panamanian sports historians. Writer Nicolas Espinoza Serrano, of La Estrella de Panama newspaper, for example, ranks him at number 9 among the ten greatest boxers from that country, behind Roberto Duran, Eusebio Pedroza, Panama Al Brown, Ismael Laguna, Hilario Zapata, Santiago Zorrilla, Ernesto Marcel and Jorge Lujan but ahead of Enrique Pinder.

The prominent Panamanian boxing trainer Rigoberto Garibaldi also considers Amaya one of the best boxers ever from Panama, and a "glory of Panamanian boxing".

== See also ==
- List of Panamanians
