= Isaac Marin =

Costa Rican boxer

Personal information
- Born: 13 February 1946 (age 79); San José, Costa Rica

Sport
- Sport: Boxing

Isaac Marin (born 13 February 1946) is a Costa Rican former professional boxer. He competed in the men's light welterweight event at the 1968 Summer Olympics.

== Professional career ==
Marin competed in 68 professional bouts. Instead of going up in weight like most boxers, Martin went down two weight divisions when he became a professional boxer. Highlights of his career include fighting Antonio Amaya, beating future world title challenger Francisco Coronado twice, future Alexis Arguello world title challenger Diego Alcala and Love Allotey, losing to former world champion Alfonso Frazer and challenging Ricardo Arredondo for the Mexican's World Boxing Council World Super Featherweight (Junior Lightweight) title, losing to Arredondo in a somewhat controversial and close but unanimous fifteen round decision with scores of 145-146, 142-146 and 141-149 in favor of Arredondo, on January 29, 1972, in the Costa Rican capital of San Jose. Later on in his career, he lost to Antonio Gomez and to Bazooka Limon.

Marin had 37 wins, 30 losses and 1 draw (tie), with 18 wins by knockout.
