= Ricardo Arredondo =

Mexican boxer

Personal information
- Born: May 26, 1949 Apatzingán, Michoacán, Mexico
- Died: September 20, 1991 (aged 42)
- Height: 5 ft 7 in (170 cm)
- Weight: Super featherweight

Boxing career
- Reach: 69 1/2 in (177 cm)
- Stance: Orthodox

Boxing record
- Total fights: 100
- Wins: 77
- Win by KO: 58
- Losses: 22
- Draws: 1

Ricardo Arredondo (May 26, 1949 in Apatzingan, Michoacán, Mexico – September 20, 1991) was a Mexican professional boxer. A former WBC super featherweight champion, he was the brother of two-time World light welterweight champion, Rene Arredondo.

== Pro career ==
Arredondo turned pro in 1968 and in 1971 challenged Hiroshi Kobayashi for the WBA super featherweight title, but lost a decision.

=== WBC Championship ===
Later that year he took on Yoshiaki Numata for the WBC Super Featherweight title, and captured the belt with a KO victory. He defended the belt five times including against Japanese challenger Morito Kashiwaba, before losing it to Kuniaki Shibata via decision in 1974.

== Professional boxing record ==
100 fights	77 wins	22 losses
By knockout	58	3
By decision	19	17
By disqualification	0	2
Draws	1	

No.	Result	Record	Opponent	Type	Round, time	Date	Location	Notes
100	Loss	77–22–1	Kim Sang-hyun	KO	6 (10)	1979-03-17	Munhwa Gymnasium, Seoul, South Korea	
99	Win	77–21–1	Robert Perez	KO	4 (10)	1979-02-26	Sam Houston Coliseum, Houston, Texas, U.S.	
98	Loss	76–21–1	Hans Henrik Palm	TKO	5 (8)	1978-05-25	Brøndbyhallen, Brondby, Denmark	
97	Loss	76–20–1	Carlos Gil	TKO	9 (?)	1977-11-24	Santo Domingo, Dominican Republic	
96	Loss	76–19–1	Miguel Montilla	PTS	10 (10)	1977-09-16	Santo Domingo, Dominican Republic	
95	Loss	76–18–1	Rogelio Castañeda	UD	10 (10)	1977-06-10	Coliseum, San Diego, California, U.S.	
94	Loss	76–17–1	Ramiro Bolanos	UD	10 (10)	1977-03-24	Olympic Auditorium, Los Angeles, California, U.S.	
93	Loss	76–16–1	Ernesto España	PTS	10 (10)	1976-11-14	Caracas, Venezuela	
92	Loss	76–15–1	Leonardo Bermudez	PTS	10 (10)	1976-10-01	Apatzingan, Mexico	
91	Win	76–14–1	Juan Rodriguez	KO	3 (?)	1976-08-22	Tuxpan, Mexico	
90	Loss	75–14–1	Humberto Gutierrez	PTS	10 (10)	1976-06-26	Los Mochis, Mexico	
89	Loss	75–13–1	Ould Makloufi	PTS	10 (10)	1976-05-08	Algiers, Algeria	
88	Win	75–12–1	Jorge Martinez	KO	7 (10)	1976-04-23	Reynosa, Mexico	
87	Win	74–12–1	Bournerges Pascasio	KO	2 (?)	1976-03-01	Minatitlan, Mexico	
86	Loss	73–12–1	Jean Baptiste Piedvache	PTS	10 (10)	1976-02-23	Paris, France	
85	Win	73–11–1	Eleuterio Herrnandez	KO	5 (?)	1976-01-25	Tapachula, Mexico	
84	Loss	72–11–1	Ramiro Bolanos	PTS	10 (10)	1975-11-28	Coliseo Juan Cabilca, Guayaquil, Ecuador	
83	Win	72–10–1	Gil Becerra	KO	6 (?)	1975-07-19	La Paz, Mexico	
82	Win	71–10–1	Jose Luis Soberanes	PTS	10 (10)	1975-05-30	Culiacan, Mexico	
81	Win	70–10–1	Miguel Aceves	KO	2 (?)	1975-05-09	Puebla, Mexico	
80	Win	69–10–1	Johnny Martinez	KO	7 (?)	1975-02-15	Morelia, Mexico	
79	Loss	68–10–1	Alfredo Escalera	DQ	8 (10)	1974-08-03	San Juan, Puerto Rico	
78	Loss	68–9–1	Kuniaki Shibata	UD	15 (15)	1974-02-28	Nihon University Auditorium, Tokyo, Japan	Lost WBC super featherweight title
77	Loss	68–8–1	Yasutsune Uehara	UD	10 (10)	1973-11-29	Onoyama Gym, Naha, Japan	
76	Win	68–7–1	Morito Kashiwaba	KO	6 (15)	1973-09-01	Nippon Budokan, Tokyo, Japan	Retained WBC super featherweight title
75	Loss	67–7–1	Jesus Alonso	UD	10 (10)	1973-07-14	Arena Coliseo, Monterrey, Mexico	
74	Loss	67–6–1	Andries Steyn	PTS	10 (10)	1973-05-26	Ellis Park Arena, Johannesburg, South Africa	
73	Win	67–5–1	Apollo Yoshio	UD	15 (15)	1973-03-06	Fukuoka Kyuden Kinen Gymnasium, Fukuoka, Japan	Retained WBC super featherweight title
72	Win	66–5–1	Susumu Okabe	KO	12 (15)	1972-09-15	Nihon University Auditorium, Tokyo, Japan	Retained WBC super featherweight title
71	Win	65–5–1	Jesus Alonso	TKO	7 (10)	1972-08-05	Palacio de los Deportes, Mexico City, Mexico	
70	Win	64–5–1	William Martinez	KO	5 (15)	1972-04-22	Arena México, Mexico City, Mexico	Retained WBC super featherweight title
69	Win	63–5–1	Isaac Marin	UD	15 (15)	1972-01-29	Estadio Eladio Rosabal Cordero, Heredia, Costa Rica	Retained WBC super featherweight title
68	Win	62–5–1	Yoshiaki Numata	KO	10 (15)	1971-10-10	Miyagi Sports Center, Sendai, Japan	Won WBC super featherweight title
67	Win	61–5–1	Enrique Pinto	KO	2 (?)	1971-08-29	Morelia, Mexico	
66	Win	60–5–1	David Duran	KO	4 (?)	1971-08-19	Chihuahua, Mexico	
65	Win	59–5–1	Lenny Brown	KO	2 (?)	1971-07-09	Ciudad Obregon, Mexico	
64	Win	58–5–1	Gato Fajardo	KO	4 (?)	1971-06-26	Los Reyes, Mexico	
63	Win	57–5–1	Samuel Reyes	KO	3 (?)	1971-06-20	Ciudad Juarez, Mexico	
62	Win	56–5–1	Pedro Valverde	TKO	4 (10)	1971-05-27	Chihuahua, Mexico	
61	Draw	55–5–1	Sigfrido Rodriguez	PTS	10 (10)	1971-05-09	Aguascalientes, Mexico	
60	Loss	55–5	Hiroshi Kobayashi	UD	15 (15)	1971-03-04	Nihon University Auditorium, Tokyo, Japan	For WBA & The Ring super featherweight titles
59	Win	55–4	Augie Pantellas	TKO	10 (10)	1971-01-18	Spectrum, Philadelphia, Pennsylvania, U.S.	
58	Win	54–4	David Duran	KO	4 (?)	1970-12-12	Apatzingan, Mexico	
57	Win	53–4	Huracan Sanchez	KO	1 (?)	1970-12-02	Oaxaca, Mexico	
56	Win	52–4	Samuel Goss	TKO	5 (10)	1970-11-17	Spectrum, Philadelphia, Pennsylvania, U.S.	
55	Win	51–4	Miguel Riasco	TKO	6 (10)	1970-10-24	Mexico City, Mexico	
54	Win	50–4	Enrique Garcia	TKO	10 (10)	1970-09-19	Mexico City, Mexico	
53	Win	49–4	Victor Federico Echegaray	TKO	10 (10)	1970-07-18	Arena México, Mexico City, Mexico	
52	Win	48–4	Joel Gomes	KO	4 (?)	1970-05-09	Mexico City, Mexico	
51	Win	47–4	Coneja Ruiz	RTD	2 (10)	1970-04-16	Gimnasio Municipal, Torreon, Mexico	
50	Win	46–4	Roberto Santana	TKO	2 (10)	1970-03-07	Arena México, Mexico City, Mexico	
49	Loss	45–4	Alfredo Marcano	MD	10 (10)	1970-01-01	Gimnasio de Mexicali, Mexicali, Mexico	
48	Win	45–3	Alfredo Marcano	PTS	10 (10)	1969-12-08	Tijuana, Mexico	
47	Win	44–3	Jet Parker	PTS	10 (10)	1969-11-20	Ciudad Obregon, Mexico	
46	Win	43–3	Curly Dequino	UD	10 (10)	1969-10-14	Honolulu International Center, Honolulu, Hawaii, U.S.	
45	Win	42–3	Felipe Torres	PTS	10 (10)	1969-09-13	Mexico City, Mexico	
44	Win	41–3	Jorge Villanueva	TKO	10 (10)	1969-08-16	Mexico City, Mexico	
43	Win	40–3	Jalapa Montes	KO	3 (10)	1969-06-14	Apatzingan, Mexico	
42	Win	39–3	Roberto Andrade	TKO	6 (?)	1969-05-26	Tijuana, Mexico	
41	Win	38–3	Flash Besande	UD	10 (10)	1969-04-22	Civic Auditorium, Honolulu, Hawaii, U.S.	
40	Win	37–3	Esteban Fabela	KO	3 (?)	1969-03-23	Mexicali, Mexico	
39	Win	36–3	Juan Baez	TKO	4 (?)	1969-03-10	Tijuana, Mexico	
38	Win	35–3	Johnny Sandoval	TKO	6 (10)	1969-02-21	Gimnasio de Mexicali, Mexicali, Mexico	
37	Win	34–3	Felipe Gonzalez	UD	10 (10)	1969-01-19	Gimnasio de Mexicali, Mexicali, Mexico	
36	Win	33–3	Guillermo Tellez	PTS	10 (10)	1968-11-30	Mexico City, Mexico	
35	Win	32–3	Billy Brown	TKO	5 (10)	1968-11-07	Olympic Auditorium, Los Angeles, California, U.S.	
34	Win	31–3	Roberto San Martin	KO	2 (10)	1968-10-10	Ciudad Obregon, Mexico	
33	Loss	30–3	Jose Luis Lopez	PTS	10 (10)	1968-09-07	Mexico City, Mexico	
32	Win	30–2	Ray Garcia	KO	9 (?)	1968-08-10	Cordoba, Mexico	
31	Win	29–2	Luis Hernandez	KO	2 (10)	1968-08-01	Cordoba, Mexico	
30	Win	28–2	Enrique Garcia	PTS	10 (10)	1968-07-27	Mexico City, Mexico	
29	Win	27–2	Antonio Rosales	KO	8 (10)	1968-07-13	Mexico City, Mexico	
28	Win	26–2	Alfredo Meneses	UD	10 (10)	1968-06-22	Mexico City, Mexico	
27	Win	25–2	Jesus Hernandez	TKO	8 (10)	1968-05-18	Mexico City, Mexico	
26	Win	24–2	Jesus Rocha	TKO	9 (10)	1968-04-20	Monterrey, Mexico	
25	Win	23–2	Kid Clay	KO	5 (?)	1968-03-28	Managua, Nicaragua	
24	Win	22–2	Luis Berrios	KO	6 (10)	1968-03-02	Managua, Nicaragua	
23	Win	21–2	Gustavo Sosa	KO	5 (10)	1968-02-18	Puebla, Mexico	
22	Loss	20–2	Raul Cruz	DQ	10 (?)	1968-01-06	Mexico City, Mexico	
21	Win	20–1	Jaime Perez	TKO	2 (?)	1967-12-06	Mexico City, Mexico	
20	Win	19–1	Emilio Olivera	TKO	4 (?)	1967-11-22	Mexico City, Mexico	
19	Win	18–1	Jose Garcia	TKO	5 (10)	1967-10-31	Auditorio Municipal, Tuxtla Gutierrez, Mexico	
18	Win	17–1	Pepe Mota	TKO	7 (?)	1967-10-11	Mexico City, Mexico	
17	Win	16–1	Gabriel Ruiz	KO	6 (?)	1967-09-06	Mexico City, Mexico	
16	Win	15–1	Ray Pino	KO	4 (10)	1967-09-01	Guamuchil, Mexico	
15	Loss	14–1	Clemente Sánchez	PTS	10 (10)	1967-08-04	Nuevo Laredo, Mexico	
14	Win	14–0	Manuel Flores	KO	5 (10)	1967-07-14	Plaza de Toros, Nuevo Laredo, Mexico	
13	Win	13–0	Raul Anaya	KO	2 (10)	1967-07-03	Auditorio Municipal, Tuxtla Gutierrez, Mexico	
12	Win	12–0	Tino Anguiano	KO	7 (?)	1967-06-01	Apatzingan, Mexico	
11	Win	11–0	Kid Clay	PTS	10 (10)	1967-04-22	Mexico City, Mexico	
10	Win	10–0	Reynaldo Mendoza	PTS	10 (10)	1967-04-09	Managua, Nicaragua	
9	Win	9–0	P E Buitrago	KO	4 (?)	1967-04-01	Santo Domingo, Dominican Republic	
8	Win	8–0	Pedro Torres	PTS	8 (8)	1967-03-22	Mexico City, Mexico	
7	Win	7–0	Raul Martinez Mora	PTS	8 (8)	1967-01-29	Toreo de Cuatro Caminos, Mexico City, Mexico	
6	Win	6–0	Pichon Contreras	TKO	6 (10)	1966-11-21	Tuxtla Gutierrez, Mexico	
5	Win	5–0	Raul Anaya	KO	3 (10)	1966-11-07	Tuxtla Gutierrez, Mexico	
4	Win	4–0	Ray Garcia	TKO	9 (10)	1966-10-24	Tuxtla Gutierrez, Mexico	
3	Win	3–0	Teobaldo Valdovinos	PTS	10 (10)	1966-08-31	Arena Coliseo, Mexico City, Mexico	
2	Win	2–0	Manuel Justo	PTS	6 (6)	1966-08-03	Mexico City, Mexico	
1	Win	1–0	Augusto Angeles	PTS	6 (6)	1966-07-16	Mexico City, Mexico	

== Personal life ==
Arredondo was in a relationship with famous Mexican TV presenter Marcela Rubiales.

== See also ==
- Notable boxing families
- List of Mexican boxing world champions
- List of world super-featherweight boxing champions

Sporting positions
World boxing titles
Preceded by Yoshiaki Numata	WBC super featherweight champion October 10, 1971 – February 28, 1974	Succeeded by Kuniaki Shibata
