= Hiroshi Kobayashi (boxer) =

Japanese boxer

Hiroshi Kobayashi 小林 弘
Personal information
- Nationality: Japanese
- Born: 23 August 1944 (age 81) Isesaki, Japan
- Height: 5 ft 6 in (168 cm)
- Weight: Featherweight; Super-featherweight

Boxing career
- Stance: Orthodox

Boxing record
- Total fights: 75
- Wins: 61
- Win by KO: 10
- Losses: 10
- Draws: 4

Hiroshi Kobayashi (小林 弘, Kobayashi Hiroshi; born 23 August 1944 in Isesaki, Gunma, Japan) is a Japanese former professional boxer who held the undisputed super-featherweight title from 1967 to 1969. He is the division's final undisputed champion of the two-belt era and is the most recent such champion as of 2026.

== Professional career ==
Kobayashi turned pro in 1962 and won the lineal, WBC, and WBA super-featherweight title in 1967 by defeating Yoshiaki Numata by 12th-round KO in a bout where Numata was down once in the 6th and three times in the 12th round. He defended his undisputed status two times before he was stripped of his WBC title on 20 January 1969 after failing to go through with an agreed rematch with Rene Barrientos (their first fight ended in a contentious draw). Kobayashi defended his remaining titles four times before losing them to Alfredo Marcano in 1971. He retired later that year after losing by knockout in the seventh round against Roberto Durán in Panama.

== Professional boxing record ==
75 fights	61 wins	10 losses
By knockout	10	4
By decision	51	6
Draws	4	

No.	Result	Record	Opponent	Type	Round, time	Date	Location	Notes
75	Loss	61–10–4	Roberto Durán	KO	7 (10)	1971-10-16	Gimnasio Nuevo, Panama City, Panama	
74	Loss	61–9–4	Alfredo Marcano	TKO	10 (15)	1971-07-29	Prefectural Gymnasium, Aomori City, Japan	Lost WBA & The Ring super-featherweight titles
73	Win	61–8–4	Ricardo Arredondo	UD	15 (15)	1971-03-04	Nihon University Auditorium, Tokyo, Japan	Retained WBA & The Ring super-featherweight titles
72	Win	60–8–4	Shozo Saijo	SD	10 (10)	1970-12-03	Nihon University Auditorium, Tokyo, Japan	
71	Win	59–8–4	Antonio Amaya	UD	15 (15)	1970-08-23	Korakuen Hall, Tokyo, Japan	Retained WBA & The Ring super-featherweight titles
70	Win	58–8–4	Ray Adigun	UD	10 (10)	1970-06-21	Korakuen Hall, Tokyo, Japan	
69	Draw	57–8–4	Hiroshi Shoji	SD	10 (10)	1970-02-15	Tokushima City, Japan	
68	Win	57–8–3	Carlos Cañete	UD	15 (15)	1969-11-09	Nihon University Auditorium, Tokyo, Japan	Retained WBA & The Ring super-featherweight titles
67	Win	56–8–3	Victor Ramos	KO	2 (10)	1969-07-07	Japan	
66	Win	55–8–3	Antonio Amaya	SD	15 (15)	1969-04-06	Kokugikan, Tokyo, Japan	Retained WBA & The Ring super-featherweight titles
65	Win	54–8–3	Turori George	UD	10 (10)	1969-01-27	Korakuen Hall, Tokyo, Japan	
64	Win	53–8–3	Jaime Valladares	UD	15 (15)	1968-10-05	Nippon Budokan, Tokyo, Japan	Retained WBA, WBC, & The Ring super-featherweight titles
63	Loss	52–8–3	Rubén Navarro	MD	10 (10)	1968-08-26	Korakuen Hall, Tokyo, Japan	
62	Win	52–7–3	Ulises Botero	KO	6 (10)	1968-07-21	Japan	
61	Loss	51–7–3	Mando Ramos	UD	10 (10)	1968-06-20	Olympic Auditorium, Los Angeles, California, U.S.	
60	Draw	51–6–3	Rene Barrientos	MD	15 (15)	1968-03-30	Nippon Budokan, Tokyo, Japan	Retained WBA, WBC, & The Ring super-featherweight titles
59	Win	51–6–2	Yoshiaki Numata	KO	12 (15)	1967-12-14	Kokugikan, Tokyo, Japan	Won WBA, WBC, & The Ring super-featherweight titles
58	Win	50–6–2	Ki Jin Song	KO	8 (10)	1967-10-16	Japan	
57	Win	49–6–2	Chang Soo Yun	KO	7 (10)	1967-09-04	Japan	
56	Win	48–6–2	Dony Tesorio	UD	10 (10)	1967-06-26	Japan	
55	Win	47–6–2	Takao Mitsuhashi	UD	10 (10)	1967-05-08	Japan	Retained Japanese featherweight title
54	Win	46–6–2	Vicente Milan Derado	UD	10 (10)	1967-02-27	Korakuen Hall, Tokyo, Japan	
53	Win	45–6–2	Kang Il Suh	UD	10 (10)	1967-02-02	Korakuen Hall, Tokyo, Japan	
52	Win	44–6–2	Chun Kyo Shin	PTS	10 (10)	1967-01-16	Japan	
51	Win	43–6–2	Del Kid Rosario	PTS	10 (10)	1966-11-28	Japan	
50	Win	42–6–2	Sumio Nobata	PTS	10 (10)	1966-11-10	Tokoname, Japan	Retained Japanese featherweight title
49	Win	41–6–2	Nobuo Chiba	PTS	10 (10)	1966-10-10	Japan	Retained Japanese featherweight title
48	Win	40–6–2	Bobby Valdez	RTD	7 (10)	1966-08-18	Olympic Auditorium, Los Angeles, California, U.S.	
47	Win	39–6–2	Delfino Rosales	KO	9 (10)	1966-07-31	Culiacan, Mexico	
46	Draw	38–6–2	Aurelio Cazares	PTS	10 (10)	1966-07-10	Sinaloa de Leyva, Mexico	
45	Loss	38–6–1	Pedro Gómez	TKO	7 (10)	1966-06-24	Nuevo Circo, Caracas, Venezuela	
44	Loss	38–5–1	Freddie Rengifo	PTS	10 (10)	1966-05-30	Nuevo Circo, Caracas, Venezuela	
43	Draw	38–4–1	Jaime Valladares	PTS	10 (10)	1966-05-14	Quito, Ecuador	
42	Win	38–4	Hiroshi Mori	PTS	10 (10)	1966-03-31	Japan	
41	Win	37–4	Shigeo Shioyama	PTS	10 (10)	1966-02-28	Japan	Retained Japanese featherweight title
40	Win	36–4	Katsutoshi Aoki	PTS	10 (10)	1966-01-27	Japan	
39	Win	35–4	Orlando Medina	PTS	10 (10)	1965-12-09	Japan	
38	Win	34–4	Sugar Cane Carreon	PTS	10 (10)	1965-10-29	Japan	
37	Win	33–4	Hyun Kim	PTS	10 (10)	1965-09-23	Japan	
36	Win	32–4	Atsushi Gunji	PTS	10 (10)	1965-08-30	Japan	Retained Japanese featherweight title
35	Win	31–4	Kunio Sakata	PTS	10 (10)	1965-07-18	Japan	
34	Win	30–4	Jong Tae Lim	PTS	10 (10)	1965-06-27	Ichinomiya, Japan	
33	Win	29–4	Shigeo Shioyama	PTS	10 (10)	1965-05-09	Japan	Retained Japanese featherweight title
32	Win	28–4	Soo Bok Kwon	KO	7 (10)	1965-03-01	Japan	
31	Win	27–4	Yuji Masuko	UD	10 (10)	1965-01-18	Japan	Retained Japanese featherweight title
30	Win	26–4	Hyun Kim	PTS	10 (10)	1964-12-12	Maebashi, Japan	
29	Win	25–4	Atsushi Gunji	PTS	10 (10)	1964-11-09	Japan	
28	Win	24–4	Yuji Masuko	PTS	10 (10)	1964-09-28	Japan	Won Japanese featherweight title
27	Win	23–4	Dong Chun Lee	PTS	10 (10)	1964-07-09	Japan	
26	Win	22–4	Kwang Joo Lee	PTS	10 (10)	1964-06-01	Japan	
25	Win	21–4	Mitsunori Seki	PTS	10 (10)	1964-04-26	Japan	
24	Win	20–4	Porte Villa	PTS	10 (10)	1964-04-13	Japan	
23	Loss	19–4	Eduardo Guerrero	PTS	10 (10)	1964-02-20	Japan	
22	Loss	19–3	Kang Il Suh	PTS	10 (10)	1964-01-26	Osaka, Japan	
21	Loss	19–2	Johnny Jamito	RTD	6 (10)	1963-11-02	Araneta Coliseum, Quezon City, Philippines	
20	Loss	19–1	Manzo Kikuchi	PTS	10 (10)	1963-08-19	Japan	For vacant Japanese featherweight title
19	Win	19–0	Toshio Shibazaki	PTS	8 (8)	1963-07-30	Japan	
18	Win	18–0	Dommy Balajada	UD	10 (10)	1963-06-24	Japan	
17	Win	17–0	Yuji Masuko	KO	2 (10)	1963-05-13	Japan	
16	Win	16–0	Teruo Hino	PTS	8 (8)	1963-05-02	Japan	
15	Win	15–0	Kazuhiro Furuya	MD	6 (6)	1963-04-04	Kokugikan, Tokyo, Japan	
14	Win	14–0	Hideo Fukuchi	UD	6 (6)	1963-03-18	Japan	
13	Win	13–0	Isamu Kato	UD	6 (6)	1963-02-19	Japan	
12	Win	12–0	Tsutomu Yoshida	UD	6 (6)	1963-01-28	Japan	
11	Win	11–0	Noriyoshi Toyoshima	UD	6 (6)	1962-12-31	Japan	
10	Win	10–0	Hisao Omori	UD	4 (4)	1962-12-15	Japan	
9	Win	9–0	Saburo Yanagi	SD	4 (4)	1962-11-29	Japan	
8	Win	8–0	Kazuo Hayasako	UD	4 (4)	1962-11-07	Korakuen Gym, Tokyo, Japan	
7	Win	7–0	Masayoshi Otake	UD	4 (4)	1962-10-16	Japan	
6	Win	6–0	Kazuyoshi Ohashi	UD	4 (4)	1962-09-25	Japan	
5	Win	5–0	Kiyokazu Komura	UD	4 (4)	1962-09-11	Japan	
4	Win	4–0	Saburo Yanagi	UD	4 (4)	1962-08-20	Japan	
3	Win	3–0	Yukichi Takase	UD	4 (4)	1962-07-30	Japan	
2	Win	2–0	Michio Ishii	TKO	2 (4)	1962-07-13	Japan	
1	Win	1–0	Hisatsugu Kyoya	MD	4 (4)	1962-07-02	Korakuen Gym, Tokyo, Japan	

== Titles in boxing ==
=== Major world titles ===
- WBA super featherweight champion (130 lbs)
- WBC super featherweight champion (130 lbs)

=== The Ring magazine titles ===
- The Ring super featherweight champion (130 lbs)

=== Regional/International titles ===
- Japanese featherweight champion (126 lbs)

=== Undisputed titles ===
- Undisputed super featherweight champion

== See also ==
- Lineal championship
- Boxing in Japan
- List of Japanese boxing world champions
- List of world super-featherweight boxing champions

Sporting positions
Regional boxing titles
Preceded by Yuji Masuko	Japanese featherweight champion 28 September 1964 – 1967; Vacated	Vacant Title next held by Nobuo Chiba
World boxing titles
Preceded by Yoshiaki Numata	WBA super featherweight champion 16 December 1967 – 29 July 1971	Succeeded by Alfredo Marcano
Preceded by Yoshiaki Numata	WBC super featherweight champion 16 December 1967 – 19 January 1969; Stripped	Vacant Title next held by Rene Barrientos
Preceded by Yoshiaki Numata	The Ring super featherweight champion 16 December 1967 – 29 July 1971	Succeeded by Alfredo Marcano
Preceded by Yoshiaki Numata	Undisputed super featherweight champion 16 December 1967 – 19 January 1969; Titles fragmented	Vacant
