= Yoshiaki Numata =

Japanese boxer (born 1945)

Yoshiaki Numata 沼田 義明
Personal information
- Nationality: Japanese
- Born: 19 April 1945 (age 81) Hokkaido, Empire of Japan (now Japan)
- Height: 5 ft 7 1/2 in (171 cm)
- Weight: Super featherweight; Lightweight

Boxing career
- Stance: Orthodox

Boxing record
- Total fights: 55
- Wins: 44
- Win by KO: 12
- Losses: 8
- Draws: 3

Yoshiaki Numata (沼田 義明, Numata Yoshiaki; born April 19, 1945 in Hokkaidō, Japan) is a former Undisputed Super Featherweight boxing champion.

== Professional career ==
Numata turned professional in 1962 and won the Lineal, WBC and WBA super featherweight world titles by defeating Flash Elorde by decision in 1967, although Numata was knocked down in the 3rd round. He lost the title in his first defense to Hiroshi Kobayashi by KO in the 12th. Numata was down once in the 6th and three times in the 12th round.

In 1969 Numata moved up weight class to challenge undisputed lightweight champion Mando Ramos, he would lose via sixth round stoppage.

In 1970 Numata captured the WBC super featherweight title with a decision over Rene Barrientos. He defended the title three times before losing the belt to Ricardo Arredondo in 1971. Numata retired a year later.

== Professional boxing record ==
55 fights	44 wins	8 losses
By knockout	12	6
By decision	32	2
Draws	3	

No.	Result	Record	Opponent	Type	Round, time	Date	Location	Notes
55	Loss	44–8–3	Kenji Iwata	KO	3 (10)	1972-03-02	Japan	
54	Loss	44–7–3	Ricardo Arredondo	KO	10 (15)	1971-10-10	Miyagi Sports Center, Sendai, Japan	Lost WBC super-featherweight title
53	Win	44–6–3	Lionel Rose	UD	15 (15)	1971-05-30	Prefectural Gymnasium, Hiroshima, Japan	Retained WBC super-featherweight title
52	Win	43–6–3	Rene Barrientos	SD	15 (15)	1971-01-03	Sunpu Arena, Shizuoka, Japan	Retained WBC super-featherweight title
51	Win	42–6–3	Raul Rojas	KO	5 (15)	1970-09-27	Nihon University Auditorium, Tokyo, Japan	Retained WBC super-featherweight title
50	Win	41–6–3	Raymond Rivera	UD	10 (10)	1970-08-16	Japan	
49	Win	40–6–3	Chang Bok Lee	PTS	10 (10)	1970-06-13	Tomakomai, Japan	
48	Win	39–6–3	Rene Barrientos	SD	15 (15)	1970-04-05	Metropolitan Gym, Tokyo, Japan	Won WBC super-featherweight title
47	Draw	38–6–3	Sumio Nobata	UD	10 (10)	1970-01-01	Japan	
46	Win	38–6–2	Jun Koiwa	KO	2 (10)	1969-11-27	Suizenji Gym, Kumamoto, Japan	
45	Loss	37–6–2	Mando Ramos	KO	6 (15)	1969-10-04	Sports Arena, Los Angeles, California, U.S.	For WBA, WBC and The Ring lightweight titles
44	Win	37–5–2	Ricardo Bermisa	UD	10 (10)	1969-07-17	Japan	
43	Draw	36–5–2	Jun Koiwa	PTS	10 (10)	1969-04-24	Japan	
42	Draw	36–5–1	Ruben Navarro	PTS	10 (10)	1968-12-05	Japan	
41	Win	36–5	Rosalava Kid	UD	10 (10)	1968-09-12	Korakuen Hall, Tokyo, Japan	
40	Win	35–5	Kang Il Suh	KO	7 (12)	1968-06-13	Japan	Won vacant OPBF super-featherweight title
39	Win	34–5	Jun Koiwa	UD	10 (10)	1968-03-21	Japan	
38	Loss	33–5	Hiroshi Kobayashi	KO	12 (15)	1967-12-14	Kuramae Kokugikan, Tokyo, Japan	Lost WBA, WBC and The Ring super-featherweight titles
37	Win	33–4	Sae Chun Lee	UD	10 (10)	1967-10-05	Sapporo, Japan	
36	Win	32–4	Gabriel Elorde	MD	15 (15)	1967-06-15	Kuramae Kokugikan, Tokyo, Japan	Won WBA, WBC and The Ring super-featherweight titles
35	Win	31–4	Chokchai KrissanachaI	UD	10 (10)	1967-03-23	Ōita, Japan	
34	Win	30–4	Kwang Joo Lee	PTS	10 (10)	1967-01-12	Japan	
33	Win	29–4	Del Kid Rosario	SD	12 (12)	1966-10-22	Japan	Retained OPBF super-featherweight title
32	Loss	28–4	Del Kid Rosario	PTS	10 (10)	1966-08-11	Japan	
31	Win	28–3	Gabriel Elorde	UD	12 (12)	1966-06-09	Nihon University Auditorium, Tokyo, Japan	Won OPBF lightweight title
30	Win	27–3	Jong Tae Lim	KO	2 (12)	1966-03-24	Ōita, Japan	Retained OPBF super-featherweight title
29	Loss	26–3	Kang Il Suh	PTS	10 (10)	1966-02-10	Japan	
28	Loss	26–2	Love Allotey	KO	4 (10)	1965-12-23	Japan	
27	Win	26–1	Antonio Paiva	PTS	10 (10)	1965-11-11	Japan	
26	Loss	25–1	Yuji Amashima	KO	4 (10)	1965-07-29	Japan	
25	Win	25–0	Hidemori Tsujimoto	PTS	10 (10)	1965-05-20	Japan	
24	Win	24–0	Larry Flaviano	PTS	12 (12)	1965-04-01	Sapporo, Japan	Won OPBF super-featherweight title
23	Win	23–0	Young Pal Lee	PTS	10 (10)	1965-01-28	Japan	
22	Win	22–0	Takeo Sugimori	PTS	10 (10)	1964-12-03	Japan	
21	Win	21–0	Atom Hatai	KO	5 (10)	1964-11-05	Japan	
20	Win	20–0	Katsumi Yabe	PTS	10 (10)	1964-09-03	Japan	
19	Win	19–0	Larry Fernando	PTS	10 (10)	1964-07-30	Sapporo, Japan	
18	Win	18–0	Lennie Campos	PTS	10 (10)	1964-05-28	Japan	
17	Win	17–0	Jae Keun Yang	PTS	10 (10)	1964-04-23	Japan	
16	Win	16–0	Pedro Adigue	PTS	10 (10)	1964-03-12	Japan	
15	Win	15–0	Yasuyuki Orito	PTS	10 (10)	1963-12-19	Sapporo, Japan	
14	Win	14–0	Katsuzo Nakamura	TKO	3 (10)	1963-11-07	Japan	
13	Win	13–0	Kenzo Shimamura	KO	4 (8)	1963-09-12	Japan	
12	Win	12–0	Noriyoshi Toyoshima	PTS	6 (6)	1963-07-11	Japan	
11	Win	11–0	Katsuhiro Sugawara	PTS	6 (6)	1963-05-30	Japan	
10	Win	10–0	Kuniaki Masuda	KO	2 (6)	1963-05-09	Japan	
9	Win	9–0	Tatsuo Hokkai	UD	4 (4)	1963-04-11	Japan	
8	Win	8–0	Yasushi Matsuzoe	UD	4 (4)	1963-03-07	Nakajima Sports Center, Sapporo, Japan	
7	Win	7–0	Susumu Akimoto	UD	4 (4)	1963-02-05	Japan	
6	Win	6–0	Hiroshi Kaneko	TKO	1 (4)	1963-01-04	Japan	
5	Win	5–0	Tadao Abe	UD	4 (4)	1962-11-24	Japan	
4	Win	4–0	Nabuyoshi Mizusaki	KO	2 (4)	1962-11-08	Japan	
3	Win	3–0	Kazuji Toji	KO	1 (4)	1962-10-18	Japan	
2	Win	2–0	Kaoru Morita	UD	4 (4)	1962-08-23	Sapporo, Japan	
1	Win	1–0	Toshio Aida	TKO	3 (4)	1962-07-26	Japan	

== Titles in boxing ==
=== Major world titles ===
- WBA super featherweight champion (130 lbs)
- WBC super featherweight champion (130 lbs) (2×)

=== The Ring magazine titles ===
- The Ring super featherweight champion (130 lbs)

=== Regional/International titles ===
- OPBF super featherweight champion (130 lbs) (2×)
- OPBF lightweight champion (135 lbs)

=== Undisputed titles ===
- Undisputed super featherweight champion

== See also ==
- List of male boxers
- Boxing in Japan
- List of Japanese boxing world champions
- List of world super-featherweight boxing champions

Sporting positions
Regional boxing titles
Preceded by Larry Flaviano	OPBF super-featherweight champion 1 April 1965 – 15 June 1967; Won world title	Vacant Title next held by Himself
Preceded by Gabriel Elorde	OPBF lightweight champion 9 June 1966 – 1966; Vacated	Vacant Title next held by Pedro Adigue
Vacant Title last held by Himself	OPBF super-featherweight champion 13 June 1968 – 1969; Vacated	Vacant Title next held by Suleman Itti Aanuchit
World boxing titles
Preceded by Gabriel Elorde	WBA super-featherweight champion 15 June 1967 – 14 December 1967	Succeeded by Hiroshi Kobayashi
Preceded by Gabriel Elorde	WBC super-featherweight champion 15 June 1967 – 14 December 1967	Succeeded by Hiroshi Kobayashi
Preceded by Gabriel Elorde	The Ring super-featherweight champion 15 June 1967 – 14 December 1967	Succeeded by Hiroshi Kobayashi
Preceded by Gabriel Elorde	Undisputed super-featherweight champion 15 June 1967 – 14 December 1967	Succeeded by Hiroshi Kobayashi
Preceded by Rene Barrientos	WBC super-featherweight champion 5 April 1970 –10 October 1971	Succeeded by Ricardo Arredondo
