= Rene Barrientos (boxer) =

Filipino boxer

Personal information
- Nationality: Filipino
- Born: Ireneo Barrientos; July 25, 1943 (age 82) Balete, Aklan, Philippines
- Weight: Super featherweight; Lightweight

Boxing career
- Stance: Southpaw

Boxing record
- Total fights: 48
- Wins: 39
- Win by KO: 14
- Losses: 7
- Draws: 2

Ireneo "Rene" Barrientos (born February 28, 1943) is a Filipino former professional boxer. He competed from 1962 to 1978 and held the WBC Lightweight and Jr. Lightweight title in 1969.

== Early life ==
Ireneo "Rene" Barrientos was born on July 25, 1943, in Balete, Aklan, the fourth of 10 children whose father was a policeman. Their father died when Barrientos was 12 years old. At 15, he joined his brothers working in the farm in Cotabato after their migration.

Like most boxers, Barrientos dropped out of school at age 17 due to poverty and worked as a mechanic's helper in a logging firm. He was promoted to the position of foreman when the company transferred its concession to Samar.

== Professional career ==
Upon his return to Cotabato, Barrientos saw upon Gabriel "Flash" Elorde's world title fight against Harold Gomes at a movie house and was fascinated by the sport of prizefighting especially that Elorde became world champion that time. He turned pro on October 2, 1962, knocking out Charlie (Carlito) Kid in the second round. He transferred to Cagayan de Oro and on February 27, 1965, he faced his idol Flash Elorde in a 12-round match for the Orient Pacific Boxing Federation lightweight title at the Cebu Coliseum. Elorde was already the world super featherweight champion at that time but his world title belt was not at stake. Barrientos fought Elorde with a tough fight for 12 rounds, but he lost a unanimous decision. After the match, Elorde commented that Barrientos will become a future champion. Barrientos went on to win over Carl Peñalosa, the father of world champions Gerry and Dodie Boy Peñalosa, twice. In the first encounter, Barrientos won by 4th-round via Technical Knockout (TKO). During the rematch, he won by unanimous decision. Both fights were held at the Cebu Coliseum. After 11 straight victories following the match with Elorde, he lost a decision then draw the rematch in succession with future junior welterweight champion Pedro Adigue Jr. on January 21 then on February 17, 1967.

On April 29, 1967, he won the Philippine super featherweight title via points decision over Raymond Rivera in a fight held in Davao City.

He battled WBC/WBA super featherweight/junior lightweight champion Hiroshi Kobayashi on March 30, 1968, in Tokyo, Japan. The fight ended in a controversial majority draw with the judge and referee from Japan scoring it a draw, while the Filipino judge saw it in favor of Barrientos. The WBC ordered an immediate rematch, which Kobayashi refused, prompting the WBC to strip the Japanese of his title and ordered the number one contender Barrientos to face the number two contender Ruben Navarro of Los Angeles, California.

Barrientos defeated Navarro by unanimous decision at the Araneta Coliseum on February 15, 1969. It was reported that Barrientos vomited an hour before the fight time, but pummeled his opponent badly to win convincingly. Barrientos’ reign as world champion lasted only more than a year as he lost a controversial split-decision to Japan's Yoshiaki Numata in Tokyo, Japan on January 3, 1971.

He retired after his majority decision win over Javier Ayala in Hawaii on July 25, 1972, after injuring his left hand. But he returned to the ring in 1978 for two more victories in fights against Filipino Joe Faune by 2nd-round KO and Thai Jong Satherigym by decision.

During Mayor Oscar Moreno's term, Barrientos offers training, advice, and guidance to Association of Boxing Alliances in the Philippines (ABAP) boxers in Cagayan de Oro City under the patronage of the said mayor. At present, Rene Barrientos manage his 3 apartments beside his family compound.

== Professional boxing record ==
48 fights	39 wins	7 losses
By knockout	14	1
By decision	25	6
Draws	2	

No.	Result	Record	Opponent	Type	Round, time	Date	Location	Notes
48	Win	39–7–2	Jong Satherigym	PTS	10 (10)	May 27, 1978	Cebu City, Philippines	
47	Win	38–7–2	Joe Faune	KO	2 (?)	February 11, 1978	Gold City Coliseum, Cagayan de Oro City, Philippines	
46	Win	37–7–2	Javier Ayala	MD	10 (10)	July 25, 1972	Honolulu International Center, Honolulu, Hawaii, US	
45	Win	36–7–2	Armando Zerpa	TKO	9 (10)	May 27, 1972	Honolulu International Center, Honolulu, Hawaii, US	
44	Win	35–7–2	Tatsunao Mitsuyama	TKO	4 (10)	June 4, 1971	Rizal Memorial Stadium, Manila, Philippines	
43	Loss	34–7–2	Yoshiaki Numata	SD	15 (15)	January 3, 1971	Sunpu Arena, Shizuoka, Japan	For WBC super-featherweight title
42	Win	34–6–2	Guts Ishimatsu	MD	10 (10)	October 29, 1970	Honolulu International Center, Honolulu, Hawaii, US	
41	Win	33–6–2	Roger Zami	TKO	7 (10)	September 29, 1970	Honolulu International Center, Honolulu, Hawaii, US	
40	Win	32–6–2	Suleman Itti Aanuchit	TKO	8 (12)	August 14, 1970	Araneta Coliseum, Quezon City, Philippines	Won OPBF super featherweight Title
39	Win	31–6–2	Shinichi Kadota	PTS	10 (10)	June 6, 1970	Araneta Coliseum, Quezon City, Philippines	
38	Loss	30–6–2	Yoshiaki Numata	SD	15 (15)	April 5, 1970	Metropolitan Gym, Japan	Lost WBC super-featherweight title
37	Win	30–5–2	Yukinori Hiraki	PTS	10 (10)	February 28, 1970	Cagayan de Oro City, Philippines	
36	Win	29–5–2	Eugenio Espinoza	UD	10 (10)	December 20, 1969	Manila, Philippines	
35	Loss	28–5–2	Adolph Pruitt	TKO	7 (10)	July 29, 1969	Honolulu International Center, Honolulu, Hawaii, US	
34	Win	28–4–2	Len Kesey	TKO	9 (10)	April 15, 1969	Honolulu International Center, Honolulu, Hawaii, US	
33	Win	27–4–2	Ruben Navarro	UD	15 (15)	February 15, 1969	Araneta Coliseum, Barangay Cubao, Quezon City, Philippines	Won vacant WBC super-featherweight title
32	Win	26–4–2	Sumio Nobata	PTS	10 (10)	December 21, 1968	Davao City, Philippines	
31	Win	25–4–2	Antonio Amaya	PTS	10 (10)	June 22, 1968	Araneta Coliseum, Barangay Cubao, Quezon City, Philippines	
30	Draw	24–4–2	Hiroshi Kobayashi	MD	15 (15)	March 30, 1968	Nippon Budokan, Japan	for the WBC & WBA super-featherweight title.
29	Win	24–4–1	Hubert Kang	PTS	10 (10)	January 14, 1968	Araneta Coliseum, Barangay Cubao, Quezon City, Philippines	
28	Win	23–4–1	Sumio Nobata	KO	6 (10)	November 13, 1967	Japan	
27	Win	22–4–1	Koji Okano	UD	10 (10)	October 23, 1967	Chiba City, Japan	
26	Loss	21–4–1	Antonio Amaya	PTS	10 (10)	July 22, 1967	Estadio Juan Demóstenes Arosemena, Panama City, Panama	
25	Win	21–3–1	Francisco Bolivar	PTS	10 (10)	June 19, 1967	Nuevo Circo, Caracas, Venezuela	
24	Win	20–3–1	Raymond Rivera	PTS	12 (12)	April 29, 1967	Davao City, Philippines	Philippines Games & Amusement Board Super Feather Title
23	Draw	19–3–1	Pedro Adigue	PTS	12 (12)	February 17, 1967	Philippines	for the OPBF Light Title
22	Loss	19–3	Pedro Adigue	PTS	12 (12)	January 21, 1967	Araneta Coliseum, Barangay Cubao, Quezon City, Philippines	for the OPBF Light Title
21	Win	19–2	Kang Il Suh	PTS	10 (10)	October 1, 1966	Manila, Philippines	
20	Win	18–2	Raymond Rivera	PTS	12 (12)	August 26, 1966	Gold City Coliseum, Cagayan de Oro City, Philippines	
19	Win	17–2	Young Terror	TKO	9 (?)	February 19, 1966	Araneta Coliseum, Barangay Cubao, Quezon City, Philippines	
18	Win	16–2	Ric Penalosa	PTS	3 (3)	January 15, 1966	Cebu Coliseum, Cebu City, Philippines	One of 3 bouts Barrientos had that day.
17	Win	15–2	Baby Paramount	PTS	3 (3)	January 15, 1966	Cebu Coliseum, Cebu City, Philippines	One of 3 bouts Barrientos had that day.
16	Win	14–2	Ely Yares	PTS	3 (3)	January 15, 1966	Cebu Coliseum, Cebu City, Philippines	One of 3 bouts Barrientos had that day.
15	Win	13–2	Love Allotey	PTS	10 (10)	November 20, 1965	Rizal Memorial Coliseum, Manila, Philippines	
14	Win	12–2	Noriyoshi Toyoshima	PTS	10 (10)	October 2, 1965	Araneta Coliseum, Barangay Cubao, Quezon City, Philippines	
13	Win	11–2	Larry Flaviano	TKO	7 (?)	August 2, 1965	Araneta Coliseum, Barangay Cubao, Quezon City, Philippines	
12	Win	10–2	Carl Penalosa	PTS	10 (10)	June 19, 1965	Cebu Coliseum, Cebu City, Philippines	
11	Win	9–2	Carl Penalosa	TKO	4 (12)	May 15, 1965	Cebu Coliseum, Cebu City, Philippines	
10	Loss	8–2	Gabriel Elorde	UD	12 (12)	February 27, 1965	Cebu Coliseum, Cebu City, Philippines	
9	Win	8–1	Francisco Balug	PTS	10 (10)	January 16, 1965	Cebu City, Philippines	
8	Win	7–1	Jose Flash Juezon	PTS	10 (10)	October 31, 1964	Philippines	
7	Win	6–1	Young Terror	PTS	12 (12)	September 19, 1964	Cagayan de Oro City, Philippines	
6	Win	5–1	Arthur Fuego	KO	3 (?)	August 25, 1964	Cagayan de Oro City, Philippines	
5	Win	4–1	Koshiro Shimoji	PTS	10 (10)	June 27, 1964	Aquino Coliseum, Davao City, Philippines	
4	Win	3–1	Rudy Perocho	KO	8 (?)	May 3, 1964	Davao City, Philippines	
3	Loss	2–1	Sampandh Laemfapha	PTS	10 (10)	March 28, 1964	Gold City Coliseum, Cagayan de Oro City, Philippines	
2	Win	2–0	Arthur Fuego	KO	3 (?)	January 25, 1964	Cagayan de Oro City, Philippines	
1	Win	1–0	Charlie Kid	KO	2 (?)	October 2, 1962	Cotabato City, Philippines	

== See also ==
- List of world super-featherweight boxing champions
- List of Filipino boxing world champions

Sporting positions
World boxing titles
Vacant Title last held by Hiroshi Kobayashi	WBC Super featherweight champion February 15, 1969 – April 5, 1970	Succeeded by Yoshiaki Numata
