= Pedro Adigue =

Filipino boxer

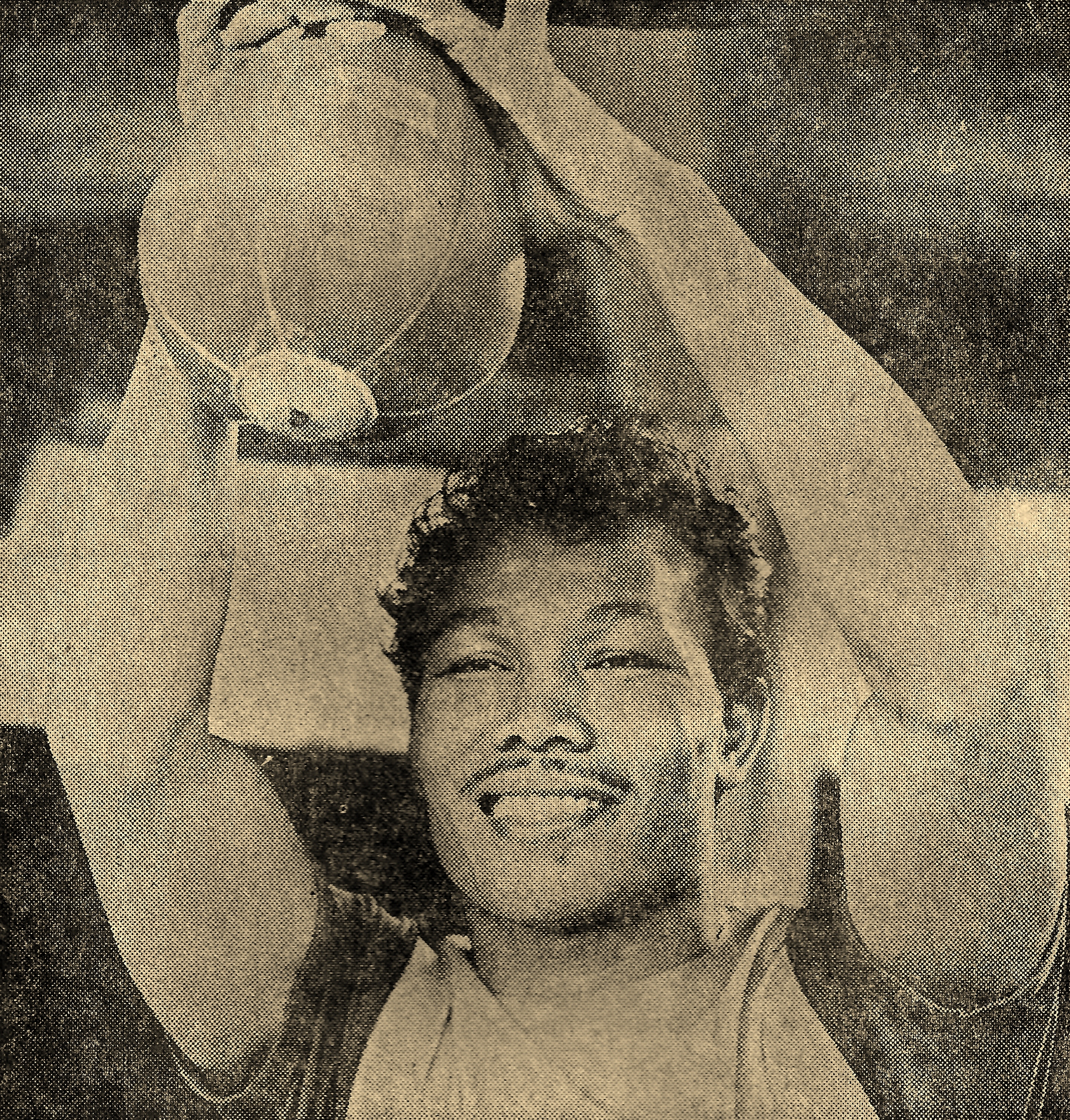
- Pedro Adigue taking a break during work-out

Personal information
- Nationality: Filipino
- Born: Pedro Adigue Jr. November 16, 1943 Palanas, Commonwealth of the Philippines
- Died: November 20, 2003 (aged 60) Manila, Philippines
- Height: 5 ft 6 in (168 cm)
- Weight: Lightweight; Light welterweight

Boxing career
- Reach: 69 1/2 in (177 cm)
- Stance: Orthodox

Boxing record
- Total fights: 65
- Wins: 37
- Win by KO: 15
- Losses: 21
- Draws: 7

Pedro Adigue Jr. (November 16, 1943 – November 20, 2003) was a world champion boxer. He came from the small town of Bontod in Palanas, Masbate, the Philippines.

== Early life ==
Pedro was born on November 16, 1943, in Bontod, Masbate, Philippines.

== Professional career ==
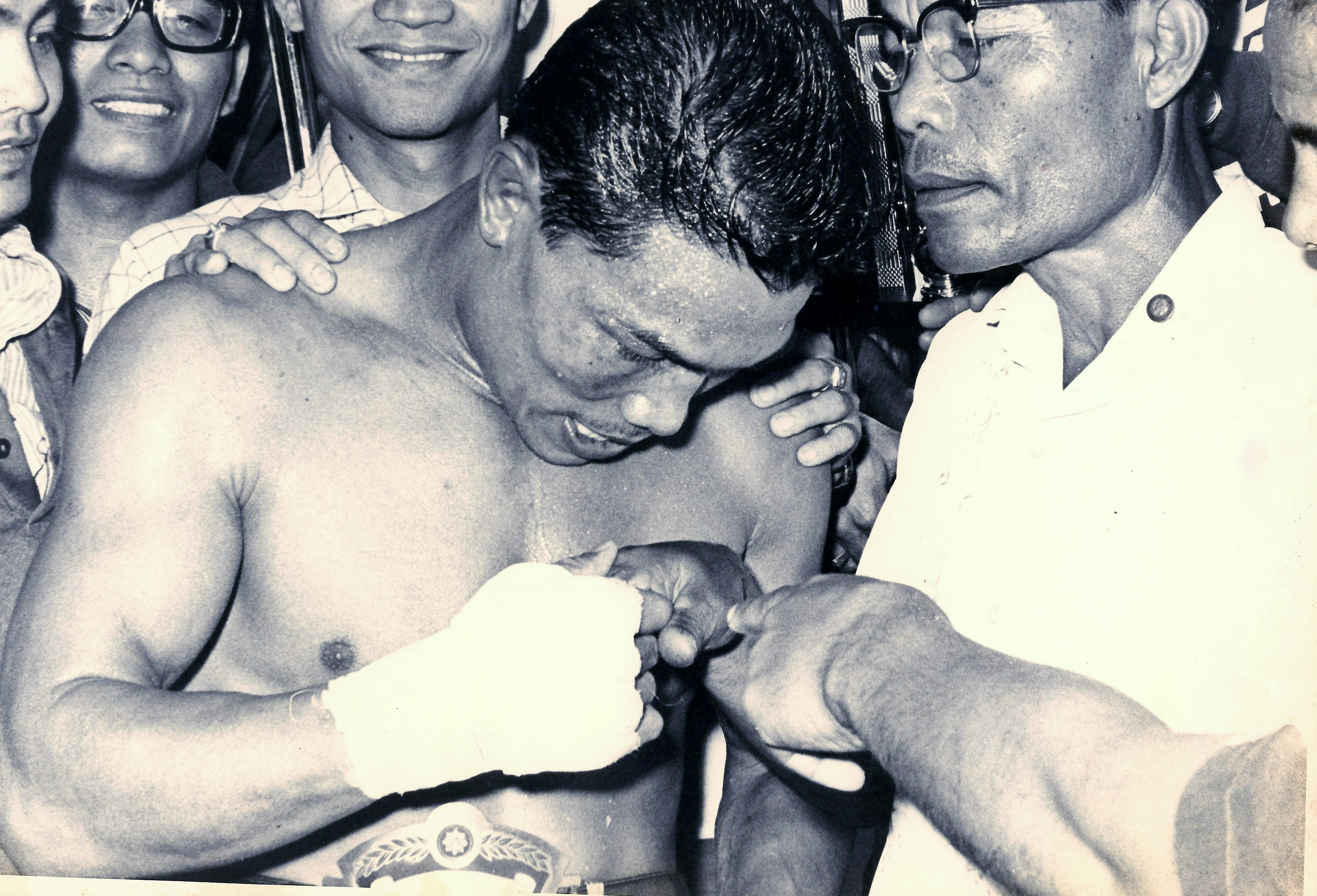
Pedro Adigue Jr. with his father

Adigue became a professional boxer on February 18, 1962. After 14 bouts (11 wins, 1 loss and 2 draws), he fought Carl Peñalosa for the Philippine lightweight title but lost on points. Adigue challenged Peñalosa again for the same title on August 2, 1965, but this time won by knockout in the 7th round. He defended his crown once with a decision win over Rudy Perucho June 10, 1966.

He then won the Oriental and Pacific Boxing Federation (OPBF) lightweight title on September 30, 1966, and defended it five times.

He then won the vacant WBC light welterweight championship in 1968 at the Araneta Coliseum in Quezon City, Philippines, when he defeated Adolph Pruitt. In his first defense on January 31, 1970, he lost the title to Bruno Arcari by a unanimous decision. He won the OPBF light welterweight title in 1973. Adigue retired in 1977.

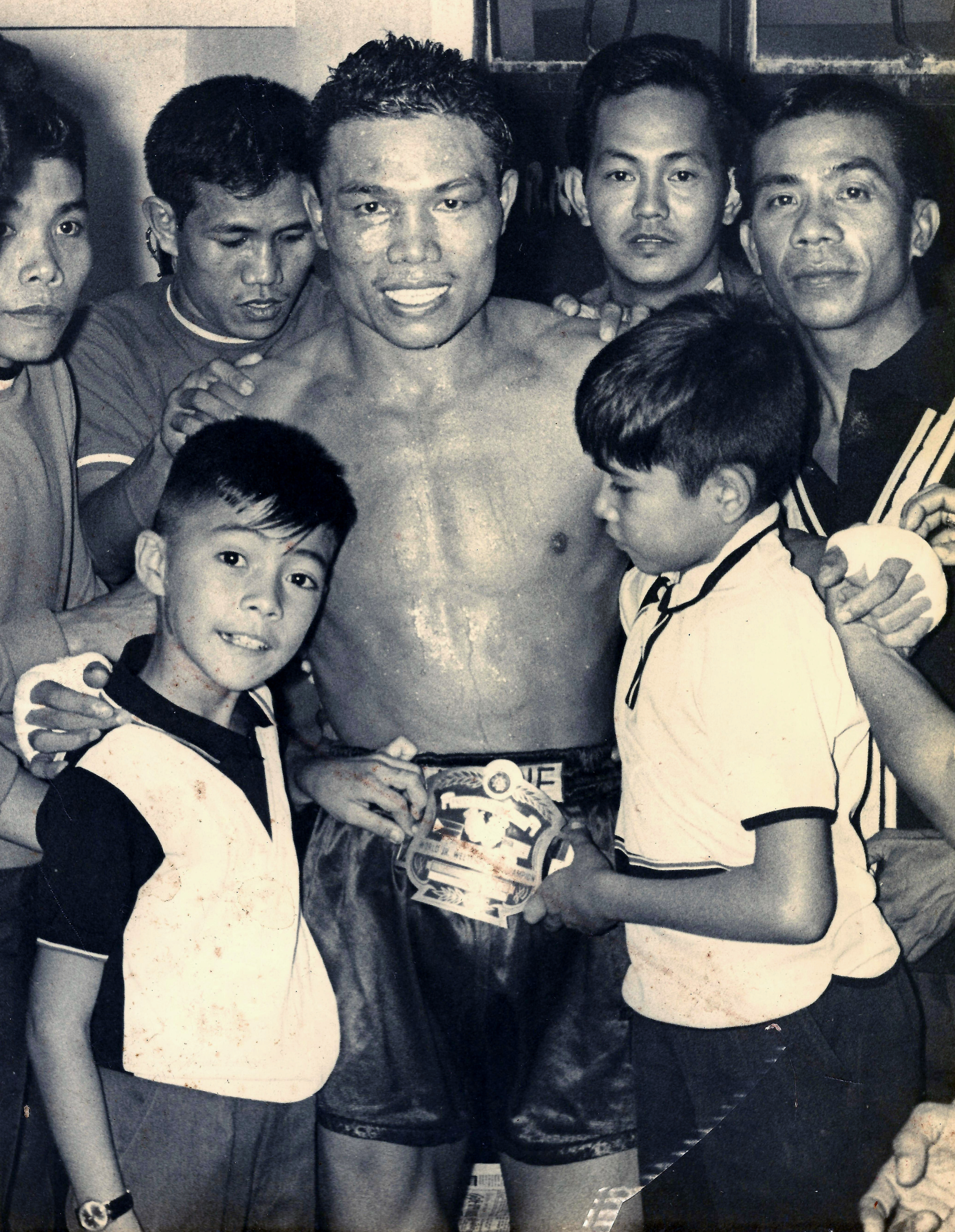
Pedro Adigue Jr after winning the WBC Jr Welterweight title against Adolph Pruitt of the USA

== Death ==
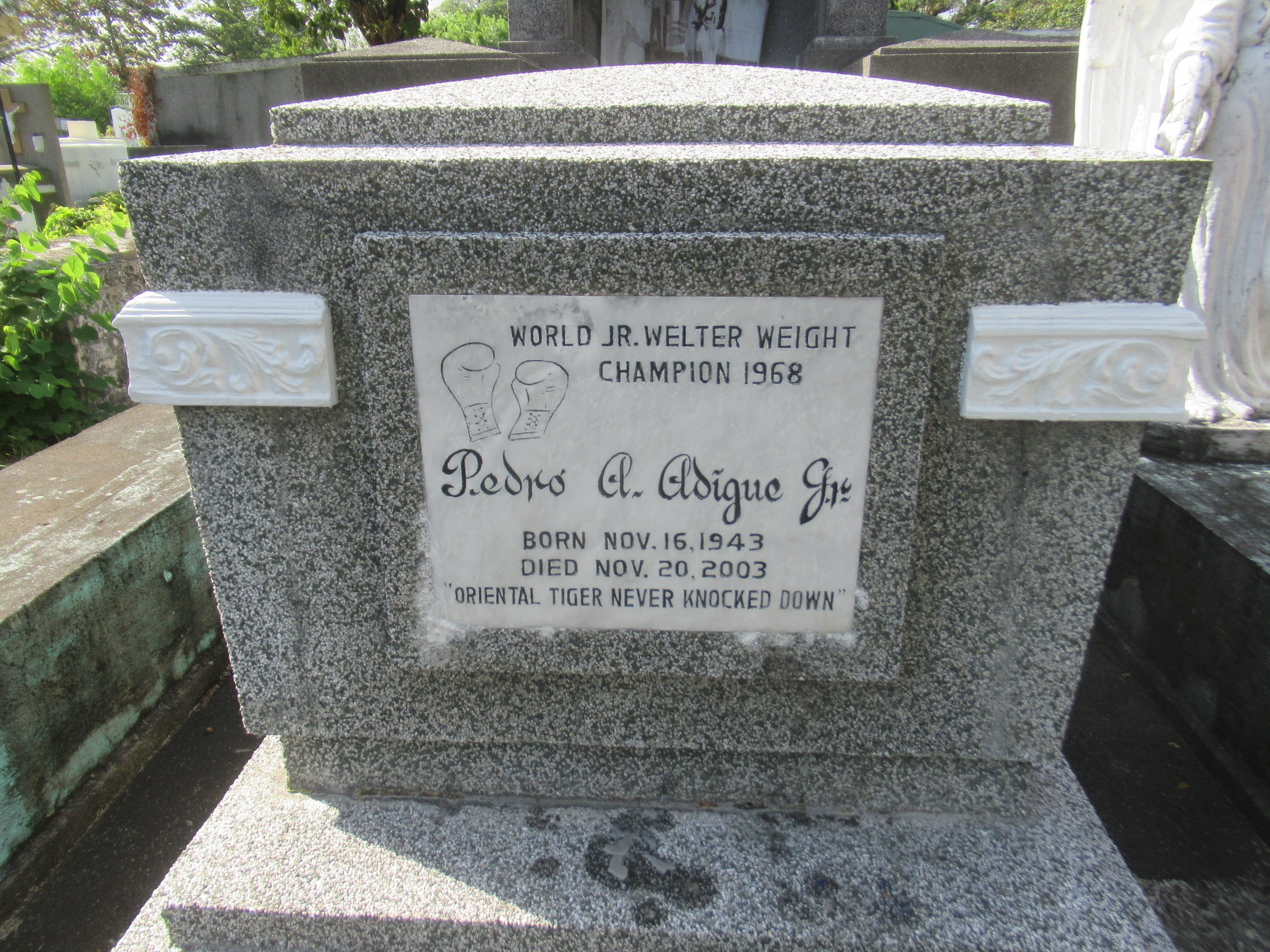
Pedro Adigue's grave at La Loma Cemetery.

Pedro died on November 20, 2003, in Rizal Medical Center, Pasig, Metro Manila, Philippines due to metastasized throat cancer.

== Professional boxing record ==
65 fights	37 wins	21 losses
By knockout	15	5
By decision	22	16
Draws	7	

No.	Result	Record	Opponent	Type	Round, time	Date	Location	Notes
65	Loss	37–21–7	(Philippines) Alberto Cruz	TKO	5	12/03/1977	Manila, Philippines	
64	Loss	37–20–7	(Philippines) Gideon Toyogon	PTS	12	18/12/1976	Balagtas, Bulacan, Philippines	Philippines GAB Welterweight Title.
63	Draw	37–19–7	(Philippines) Gideon Toyogon	TD	2	01/09/1976	Lucena City, Philippines	Philippines GAB Welterweight Title.
62	Loss	37–19–6	(Japan) Ryu Sorimachi	UD	12	16/02/1976	Japan	OPBF Welterweight Title. 53-60, 51-60, 51-60.
61	Draw	37–18–6	(Philippines) Fel Pedranza	TD	3	31/10/1975	Iloilo City, Philippines	Philippines GAB Welterweight Title.
60	Loss	37–18–5	(Australia) Hector Thompson	PTS	10	17/07/1975	Sir Hubert Murray Stadium, Port Moresby, Papua New Guinea	40-50.
59	Win	37–17–5	(Japan) Bull Kato	PTS	10	29/03/1975	(Macau) Macao	
58	Loss	36–17–5	(Philippines) Dan DeGuzman	UD	10	01/02/1975	Cabanatuan City, Philippines	
57	Loss	36–16–5	(Colombia) Antonio Cervantes	KO	5	08/06/1974	Maestranza Cesar Giron, Maracay, Venezuela	
56	Win	36–15–5	(Philippines) Dan DeGuzman	UD	10	26/01/1974	Cabanatuan City, Philippines	
55	Loss	35–15–5	(South Korea) Chang-Kil Lee	PTS	12	28/09/1973	Seoul, South Korea	OPBF Light Welterweight Title.
54	Win	35–14–5	(Thailand) Huasai Sithboonlert	PTS	12	25/07/1973	Bangkok, Thailand	OPBF Light Welterweight Title.
53	Loss	34–14–5	(Japan) Lion Furuyama	PTS	12	23/04/1973	Nihon University Auditorium, Tokyo, Japan	
52	Loss	34–13–5	(Argentina) Nicolino Locche	PTS	10	25/01/1973	Estadio Luna Park, Buenos Aires, Argentina	
51	Win	34–12–5	(Japan) Takatsune Shimizu	TKO	5	07/07/1972	Sport-O-Dome, Agana, Guam	
50	Win	33–12–5	(Japan) Lion Furuyama	PTS	10	11/09/1971	Araneta Coliseum, Quezon City, Philippines	
49	Win	32–12–5	(Australia) Graham Dicker	TKO	7	20/02/1971	Araneta Coliseum, Quezon City, Philippines	Referee stopped the bout at 2:41 of the seventh round.
48	Win	31–12–5	(Japan) Joe Tamai	KO	4	18/12/1970	Manila, Philippines	Tamai knocked out at 2:55 of the fourth round.
47	Win	30–12–5	(Italy) Johnny Infante	TKO	7	19/09/1970	Araneta Coliseum, Quezon City, Philippines	
46	Loss	29–12–5	(United States) Eddie Perkins	TKO	5	21/07/1970	Hawaii International Center, Honolulu, Hawaii, United States	
45	Loss	29–11–5	(United States) Oscar Albarado	PTS	10	02/06/1970	Hawaii International Center, Honolulu, Hawaii, United States	
44	Loss	29–10–5	(Italy) Bruno Arcari	UD	15	31/01/1970	Palazzetto dello Sport, Rome, Italy	WBC World Light Welterweight Title.
43	Win	29–9–5	(Japan) Koichi Wajima	KO	1	30/10/1969	Japan	Wajima knocked out at 2:21 of the first round.
42	Loss	28–9–5	(United States) Adolph Pruitt	TKO	5	18/02/1969	Hawaii International Center, Honolulu, Hawaii, United States	
41	Win	28–8–5	(United States) Adolph Pruitt	UD	15	14/12/1968	Araneta Coliseum, Quezon City, Philippines	WBC World Light Welterweight Title.
40	Win	27–8–5	(Japan) Benkei Fujikura	KO	2	29/08/1968	Korakuen Hall, Tokyo, Japan	Fujikura knocked out at 2:49 of the second round.
39	Win	26–8–5	(Japan) Hidemori Tsujimoto	PTS	12	07/06/1968	Araneta Coliseum, Quezon City, Philippines	OPBF Lightweight Title.
38	Win	25–8–5	(Japan) Jaguar Kakizawa	PTS	10	27/11/1967	Japan	
37	Win	24–8–5	(Philippines) Rudy Gonzalez	KO	9	07/10/1967	Manila, Philippines	
36	Win	23–8–5	(Japan) Fujio Mikami	KO	9	31/07/1967	Japan	OPBF Lightweight Title.
35	Draw	22–8–5	(Philippines) Rene Barrientos	PTS	12	17/02/1967	Philippines	OPBF Lightweight Title.
34	Win	22–8–4	(Philippines) Rene Barrientos	PTS	12	21/01/1967	Araneta Coliseum, Quezon City, Philippines	OPBF Lightweight Title.
33	Win	21–8–4	(Thailand) Charnchai Thairat	PTS	12	17/12/1966	Caloocan, Philippines	OPBF Lightweight Title.
32	Win	20–8–4	(South Korea) Boo Yong Kang	PTS	12	30/09/1966	Rizal Memorial Sports Complex, Manila, Philippines	OPBF Lightweight Title.
31	Win	19–8–4	(Philippines) Rudy Perocho	PTS	12	10/06/1966	Rizal Memorial Coliseum, Manila, Philippines	Philippines GAB Lightweight Title.
30	Loss	18–8–4	(United States) Frankie Belma	UD	10	24/03/1966	Grand Olympic Auditorium, California, United States	2-6, 0-9, 1-9.
29	Loss	18–7–4	(United States) Luis Molina	SD	10	09/12/1965	San Jose Civic, California, United States	
28	Loss	18–6–4	(Puerto Rico) Frankie Narvaez	TKO	8	11/10/1965	Hiram Bithorn Stadium, San Juan, Puerto Rico	Referee stopped the bout at 1:12 of the eighth round.
27	Win	18–5–4	(Japan) Taketeru Yoshimoto	KO	7	19/08/1965	Japan	
26	Win	17–5–4	(Philippines) Carl Penalosa	TKO	7	02/08/1965	Araneta Coliseum, Quezon City, Philippines	Philippines GAB Lightweight Title.
25	Win	16–5–4	(United States) Arthur Persley	PTS	10	22/05/1965	Araneta Coliseum, Quezon City, Philippines	
24	Win	15–5–4	(Japan) Noriyoshi Toyoshima	TKO	5	01/02/1965	Araneta Coliseum, Quezon City, Philippines	
23	Win	14–5–4	(Philippines) Ador Plaza	PTS	10	03/10/1964	Philippines	
22	Win	13–5–4	(Thailand) Somkiat Kiatmuangyom	PTS	10	11/04/1964	Philippines	
21	Draw	12–5–4	(Japan) Yasunobu Takada	PTS	10	09/04/1964	Japan	
20	Loss	12–5–3	(Japan) Yoshiaki Numata	PTS	10	12/03/1964	Japan	
19	Draw	12–4–3	(Philippines) Ric Penalosa	PTS	10	08/03/1964	Cebu Coliseum, Cebu City, Philippines	
18	Win	12–4–2	(Japan) Taketeru Yoshimoto	PTS	10	12/01/1964	Riki Sports Palace, Tokyo, Japan	
17	Loss	11–4–2	(Japan) Tsunetomi Miyamoto	PTS	10	15/12/1963	Japan	
16	Loss	11–3–2	(Japan) Teruo Kosaka	PTS	10	24/11/1963	Japan	
15	Loss	11–2–2	(Philippines) Carl Penalosa	PTS	12	20/09/1963	Cebu Coliseum, Cebu City, Philippines	Philippines GAB Lightweight Title.
14	Win	11–1–2	(South Korea) Boo Yong Kang	PTS	10	03/08/1963	Araneta Coliseum, Quezon City, Philippines	
13	Win	10–1–2	(Philippines) Buenventura Abulencia	PTS	10	15/06/1963	Rizal Memorial Sports Complex, Manila, Philippines	
12	Win	9–1–2	(Philippines) Ador Plaza	PTS	10	20/04/1963	Manila, Philippines	
11	Win	8–1–2	(Philippines) Dick Carlos	PTS	8	16/02/1963	Manila, Philippines	
10	Win	7–1–2	(Philippines) Ray Tupas	KO	5	22/12/1962	Quezon City, Philippines	
9	Win	6–1–2	(Philippines) Young Cading	KO	2	24/11/1962	Rizal Memorial Coliseum, Manila, Philippines	
8	Win	5–1–2	(Philippines) Eddie Castro	PTS	6	22/09/1962	Araneta Coliseum, Quezon City, Philippines	
7	Win	4–1–2	(Philippines) Sonny Espanol	PTS	6	07/09/1962	Manila, Philippines	
6	Draw	3–1–2	(Philippines) Del Kid Rosario	PTS	4	01/08/1962	Araneta Coliseum, Quezon City, Philippines	
5	Win	3–1–1	(Philippines) Del Kid Rosario	PTS	4	30/06/1962	Araneta Coliseum, Quezon City, Philippines	
4	Loss	2–1–1	(Philippines) Del Kid Rosario	PTS	4	29/04/1962	Manila, Philippines	
3	Win	2–0–1	(Philippines) Manny Burton	KO	3	13/04/1962	Manila, Philippines	
2	Win	1–0–1	(Philippines) Mac Valdez	KO	2	25/03/1962	Manila, Philippines	
1	Draw	0–0–1	(Philippines) Rod Doligon	PTS	4	18/02/1962	Nichols Field, Pasay, Philippines	

== See also ==
- List of world light-welterweight boxing champions
- List of Filipino boxing world champions

Sporting positions
World boxing titles
Vacant Title last held by Takeshi Fuji	WBC Light welterweight champion December 14, 1968 – January 31, 1970	Succeeded by Bruno Arcari
