= List of world super-featherweight boxing champions =

This is a list of Super featherweight boxing champions, as recognized by boxing organizations:

- The World Boxing Association (WBA), established in 1921 as the National Boxing Association (NBA).
- The World Boxing Council (WBC), established in 1963.
- The International Boxing Federation (IBF), established in 1983.
- The World Boxing Organization (WBO), established in 1988.

Reign Began	Reign Ended	Champion	Recognition
World
1921-11-18	1923-05-30	(Italy) Johnny Dundee	World
1923-05-30	1923-12-17	(United States) Jack Bernstein	World
1923-12-17	1924-06-20	(Italy) Johnny Dundee	World
1924-06-20	1925-04-01	(United States) Steve Sullivan	World
1925-04-01	1925-12-02	(United States) Mike Ballerino	World
1925-12-02	1929-12-20	(United States) Tod Morgan	World
1929-12-20	1931-07-15	(United States) Benny Bass	World
1931-07-15	1933-12-25	(Cuba) Kid Chocolate	World
1933-12-25	1934-Vacated	(United States) Frankie Klick	World
1949-12-06	1951-Vacated	(United States) Sandy Saddler	World
1959-07-20	1960-03-16	(United States) Harold Gomes	World
1960-03-16	1962-06-23	(Philippines) Flash Elorde	World
1963-02-16	1967-06-15	(Philippines) Flash Elorde	WBA/WBC
1967-06-15	1967-12-14	(Japan) Yoshiaki Numata	WBA/WBC
1967-12-14	1969-01-18	(Japan) Hiroshi Kobayashi	WBA/WBC
WBC
Title inaugurated
1963-02-16	1967-06-15	(Philippines) Gabriel Elorde	WBC
1967-06-15	1967-12-14	(Japan) Yoshiaki Numata	WBC
1967-12-14	1969-01-18-Stripped	(Japan) Hiroshi Kobayashi	WBC
1969-02-15	1970-04-05	(Philippines) Rene Barrientos	WBC
1970-04-05	1971-10-10	(Japan) Yoshiaki Numata	WBC
1971-10-10	1974-02-28	(Mexico) Ricardo Arredondo	WBC
1974-02-28	1975-07-05	(Japan) Kuniaki Shibata	WBC
1975-07-05	1978-01-28	(Puerto Rico) Alfredo Escalera	WBC
1978-01-28	1980-04-27-Vacated	(Nicaragua) Alexis Argüello	WBC
1980-12-11	1981-03-08	(Mexico) Rafael Limón	WBC
1981-03-08	1981-08-29	(Uganda) Cornelius Boza-Edwards	WBC
1981-08-29	1982-05-29	(Philippines) Rolando Navarrete	WBC
1982-05-29	1982-12-11	(Mexico) Rafael Limón	WBC
1982-12-11	1983-05-15-Stripped	(United States) Bobby Chacon	WBC
1983-08-07	1983-11-18-Vacated	(Puerto Rico) Héctor Camacho	WBC
1984-09-13	1987-08-21-Vacated	(Mexico) Julio César Chávez	WBC
1988-02-29	1994-05-07	(Ghana) Azumah Nelson	WBC
1994-05-07	1994-09-17	(United States) Jesse James Leija	WBC
1994-09-17	1995-12-01	(Mexico) Gabriel Ruelas	WBC
1995-12-01	1997-03-22	(Ghana) Azumah Nelson	WBC
1997-03-22	1998-10-03	(United States) Genaro Hernandez	WBC
1998-10-03	2002-04-20-Vacated	(United States) Floyd Mayweather Jr.	WBC
2002-08-24	2003-08-15	(Thailand) Sirimongkol Singwangcha	WBC
2003-08-15	2004-02-28	(Mexico) Jesús Chávez	WBC
2004-02-28	2004-11-27	(Mexico) Érik Morales	WBC
2004-11-27	2007-03-17	(Mexico) Marco Antonio Barrera	WBC
2007-03-17	2008-03-15	(Mexico) Juan Manuel Márquez	WBC
2008-03-15	2008-06-28-Vacated	(Philippines) Manny Pacquiao	WBC
2008-12-20	2010-03-17-Vacated	(Mexico) Humberto Soto	WBC
2010-03-17	2010-11-26	(Germany) Vitali Tajbert	WBC
2010-11-26	2012-10-27	(Japan) Takahiro Aoh	WBC
2012-10-27	2013-04-08	(Mexico) Gamaliel Diaz	WBC
2013-04-08	2015-11-21	(Japan) Takashi Miura	WBC
2015-11-21	2017-01-28	(Mexico) Francisco Vargas	WBC
2017-01-28	2021-02-20	(Mexico) Miguel Berchelt	WBC
2021-02-20	2022-04-30	(Mexico) Óscar Valdez	WBC
2022-04-30	2022-09-23-Stripped	(United States) Shakur Stevenson	WBC
2023-02-11	2024-07-06	(United States) O'Shaquie Foster	WBC
2024-07-06	2024-11-02	(Brazil) Robson Conceição	WBC
2024-11-02	Present	(United States) O'Shaquie Foster	WBC
WBA
Title inaugurated
1963-02-16	1967-06-15	(Philippines) Gabriel Elorde	WBA
1967-06-15	1967-12-14	(Japan) Yoshiaki Numata	WBA
1967-12-14	1971-03-04	(Japan) Hiroshi Kobayashi	WBA
1971-03-04	1972-04-25	(Venezuela) Alfredo Marcano	WBA
1972-04-25	1973-03-12	(Philippines) Ben Villaflor	WBA
1973-03-12	1973-10-17	(Japan) Kuniaki Shibata	WBA
1973-10-17	1976-10-16	(Philippines) Ben Villaflor	WBA
1976-10-16	1980-08-02	(Puerto Rico) Samuel Serrano	WBA
1980-08-02	1981-04-09	(Japan) Yasutsune Uehara	WBA
1981-04-09	1983-01-19	(Puerto Rico) Samuel Serrano	WBA
1983-01-19	1984-02-26	(United States) Roger Mayweather	WBA
1984-02-26	1985-05-19	(United States) Rocky Lockridge	WBA
1985-05-19	1986-05-24	(Puerto Rico) Wilfredo Gómez	WBA
1986-05-24	1986-09-27	(Panama) Alfredo Layne	WBA
1986-09-27	1991-03-15-Vacated	(South Africa) Brian Mitchell	WBA
1991-06-28	1991-06-28-Vacated	(United States) Joey Gamache	WBA
1991-11-22	1994-11-12-Vacated	(United States) Genaro Hernandez	WBA
1995-10-21	1998-09-05	(South Korea) Yong-Soo Choi	WBA
1998-09-05	1999-06-27	(Japan) Takanori Hatakeyama	WBA
1999-06-27	1999-10-31	(Mongolia) Lakva Sim	WBA
1999-10-31	2000-05-21	(South Korea) Jong-Kwon Baek	WBA
2000-05-21	2002-01-12	(Cuba) Joel Casamayor	WBA
2002-01-12	2004-01-15-Vacated	(Brazil) Acelino Freitas	WBA Super Champion
2002-04-13	2005-04-30	(Thailand) Yodsanan Sor Nanthachai	WBA Regular Champion
2005-04-30	2006-08-05	(Panama) Vicente Mosquera	WBA
2006-08-05	2008-08-31-Vacated	(Venezuela) Edwin Valero	WBA
2008-11-28	2009-10-10	(Venezuela) Jorge Linares	WBA
2009-10-10	2010-01-11	(Mexico) Juan Carlos Salgado	WBA
2010-01-11	2015-02-21	(Japan) Takashi Uchiyama	WBA
2015-02-21	2016-04-27	(Japan) Takashi Uchiyama	WBA Super Champion
2015-05-29	2016-06-24	(Dominican Republic) Javier Fortuna	WBA Regular Champion
2016-04-27	2017-10-21-Stripped	(Panama) Jezreel Corrales	WBA Super Champion
2016-06-24	2016-11-12	(United States) Jason Sosa	WBA Regular Champion
2017-10-21	2019-02-09	(Puerto Rico) Alberto Machado	WBA
2018-04-21	2019-07-27	(United States) Gervonta Davis	WBA Super Champion
2019-02-09	2019-11-23	(United States) Andrew Cancio	WBA Regular Champion
2019-11-23	2020-10-31	(Mexico) Léo Santa Cruz	WBA Super Champion
2019-11-23	2021-01-02	(Nicaragua) Rene Alvarado	WBA Regular Champion
2020-10-31	2021-08-28-Vacated	(United States) Gervonta Davis	WBA Super Champion
2021-01-02	2022-08-20	(Venezuela) Roger Gutiérrez	WBA Regular Champion/WBA
2021-01-02	2022-08-20	(Dominican Republic) Héctor García	WBA
2023-11-25	2025-12-06-Stripped	(United States) Lamont Roach Jr.	WBA
2025-12-06	2026-03-14	(United Kingdom) Jazza Dickens	WBA
2026-03-14	Present	(Republic of Ireland) Anthony Cacace	WBA
IBF
Title inaugurated
1984-04-22	1985-02-15	(South Korea) Hwan-Kil Yuh	IBF
1985-02-15	1985-07-12	(Australia) Lester Ellis	IBF
1985-07-12	1987-08-09	(Australia) Barry Michael	IBF
1987-08-09	1988-07-23	(United States) Rocky Lockridge	IBF
1988-07-23	1989-10-07	(United States) Tony Lopez	IBF
1989-10-07	1990-05-20	(Puerto Rico) John John Molina	IBF
1990-05-20	1991-09-13	(United States) Tony Lopez	IBF
1991-09-13	1991-09-13-Retired	(South Africa) Brian Mitchell	IBF
1992-02-22	1995-04-22	(Puerto Rico) John John Molina	IBF
1995-04-22	1995-07-09	(United States) Eddie Hopson	IBF
1995-07-09	1995-12-15	(United States) Tracy Harris Patterson	IBF
1995-12-15	1997-10-04-Vacated	(Canada) Arturo Gatti	IBF
1998-03-13	1999-10-23	(United States) Roberto Garcia	IBF
1999-10-23	2000-09-02-Vacated	(United States) Diego Corrales	IBF
2000-12-03	2002-08-18-Vacated	(United States) Steve Forbes	IBF
2003-02-01	2004-07-31	(United States) Carlos Hernández	IBF
2004-07-31	2004-07-31-Vacated	(Mexico) Érik Morales	IBF
2005-02-23	2005-09-17	(Australia) Robbie Peden	IBF
2005-09-17	2006-Stripped	(Mexico) Marco Antonio Barrera	IBF
2006-05-31	2006-07-29	(South Africa) Cassius Baloyi	IBF
2006-07-29	2006-11-06	(Australia) Gairy St. Clair	IBF
2006-11-06	2007-04-20	(South Africa) Malcolm Klassen	IBF
2007-04-20	2008-04-12	(South Africa) Mzonke Fana	IBF
2008-04-12	2009-04-18	(South Africa) Cassius Baloyi	IBF
2009-04-18	2009-08-22	(South Africa) Malcolm Klassen	IBF
2009-08-22	2010-02-16-Vacated	(United States) Robert Guerrero	IBF
2010-09-01	2011-05-19-Stripped	(South Africa) Mzonke Fana	IBF
2011-09-10	2013-03-09	(Mexico) Juan Carlos Salgado	IBF
2013-03-09	2014-07-10	(Dominican Republic) Argenis Mendez	IBF
2014-07-10	2015-02-10-Vacated	(Cuba) Rances Barthelemy	IBF
2015-06-13	2017-01-14	(Puerto Rico) Jose Pedraza	IBF
2017-01-14	2017-08-25-Stripped	(United States) Gervonta Davis	IBF
2017-12-09	2018-04-19-Stripped	(Japan) Kenichi Ogawa	IBF
2018-08-03	2020-01-30	(United States) Tevin Farmer	IBF
2020-01-30	2021-02-13-Stripped	(United States) Joseph Diaz	IBF
2021-11-27	2022-06-04	(Japan) Kenichi Ogawa	IBF
2022-06-04	2022-10-04-Stripped	(United Kingdom) Joe Cordina	IBF
2022-11-05	2023-04-22	(Tajikistan) Shavkat Rakhimov	IBF
2023-04-22	2024-05-18	(United Kingdom) Joe Cordina	IBF
2024-05-18	2025-01-31-Vacated	(Republic of Ireland) Anthony Cacace	IBF
2025-05-28	2026-02-28	(Mexico) Eduardo Núñez	IBF
2026-02-28	Present	(Mexico) Emanuel Navarrete	IBF
WBO
Title inaugurated
1989-04-29	1989-04-29-Vacated	(Puerto Rico) John John Molina	WBO
1989-12-09	1992-03-21	(Tunisia) Kamel Bou Ali	WBO
1992-03-21	1992-09-04	(France) Daniel Londas	WBO
1992-09-04	1994-03-05	(Denmark) Jimmi Bredahl	WBO
1994-03-05	1994-05-27-Vacated	(United States) Oscar De La Hoya	WBO
1994-09-24	1996-09-06-Vacated	(Netherlands) Regilio Tuur	WBO
1997-12-19	1998-04-01-Vacated	(United Kingdom) Barry Jones	WBO
1998-05-16	1999-08-07	(Russia) Anatoly Alexandrov	WBO
1999-08-07	2003-08-09-Vacated	(Brazil) Acelino Freitas	WBO
2004-03-06	2004-Vacated	(United States) Diego Corrales	WBO
2004-07-15	2005-04-08	(United States) Mike Anchondo	WBO
2005-04-08	2006-09-16	(Argentina) Jorge Rodrigo Barrios	WBO
2006-09-16	2008-05-15-Vacated	(Dominican Republic) Joan Guzmán	WBO
2008-05-15	2008-09-06	(United Kingdom) Alex Arthur	WBO
2008-09-06	2009-03-14	(United Kingdom) Nicky Cook	WBO
2009-03-14	2010-09-04	(Puerto Rico) Roman Martinez	WBO
2010-09-04	2011-09-Vacated	(United Kingdom) Ricky Burns	WBO
2011-11-26	2012-07-20-Stripped	(United States) Adrien Broner	WBO
2012-09-15	2013-11-09	(Puerto Rico) Román Martínez	WBO
2013-11-09	2014-10-14-Vacated	(United States) Mikey García	WBO
2014-10-14	2015-04-11	(Mexico) Orlando Salido	WBO
2015-04-11	2016-06-11	(Puerto Rico) Roman Martinez	WBO
2016-06-11	2018-05-18-Vacated	(Ukraine) Vasyl Lomachenko	WBO
2018-07-28	2019-05-25	(Japan) Masayuki Ito	WBO
2019-05-25	2021-10-23	(United States) Jamel Herring	WBO
2021-10-23	2022-09-23-Stripped	(United States) Shakur Stevenson	WBO
2023-02-03	Present	(Mexico) Emanuel Navarrete	WBO

== See also ==
- List of British world boxing champions
