= Shozo Saijo =

Japanese boxer

Personal information
- Nickname: Cinderella Boy
- Born: January 28, 1947 (age 79) Saitama, Japan
- Height: 171 cm (5 ft 7 in)
- Weight: Featherweight

Boxing career
- Stance: Orthodox

Boxing record
- Total fights: 38
- Wins: 29
- Win by KO: 8
- Losses: 7
- Draws: 2

Shozo Saijo (西城 正三, Saijō Shōzō; born January 28, 1947) is a Japanese former professional boxer from Saitama. He is a former WBA featherweight champion.

== Biography ==
Saijo made his professional debut in August, 1964, but did not show immediate promise in the ring, losing or drawing against several lowly regarded fighters. He traveled to the United States, where he fought three times before meeting WBA featherweight champion Raul Rojas in a non-title match. Saijo won by decision, and challenged Rojas for the title on September 27, 1968 in Los Angeles. He defeated Rojas for the second time, becoming the seventh Japanese boxer to win a world title, and the first Japanese boxer to win a title fighting outside Japan.

He defended the title a total of six times before losing to Antonio Gomez in 1971. He also fought in numerous non-title matches in between his defenses, including a bout against WBA super featherweight champion, Hiroshi Kobayashi, where Saijo lost by decision over 10 rounds. This was the first fight between two Japanese boxers that had possession of the world title.

Saijo retired from boxing after losing his world title, but made an ill-fated debut in the kickboxing world, where he fought muay thai champion Toshio Fujiwara. Saijo disappointed fans by turning his back towards Fujiwara at one point in their match, and he retired from all sports activities shortly afterwards. His professional boxing record was 29-7-2 (8KOs).

== See also ==
- List of featherweight boxing champions
- List of Japanese boxing world champions
- Boxing in Japan

Achievements
Preceded by Raul Rojas	WBA Featherweight Champion; September 27, 1968 - September 2, 1971	Succeeded by Antonio Gomez
Awards
Previous: Jimmy Ellis	The Ring Progress of the Year; 1968	Next: Mac Foster
