= Gabriel Elorde =

Filipino boxer (1935–1985)

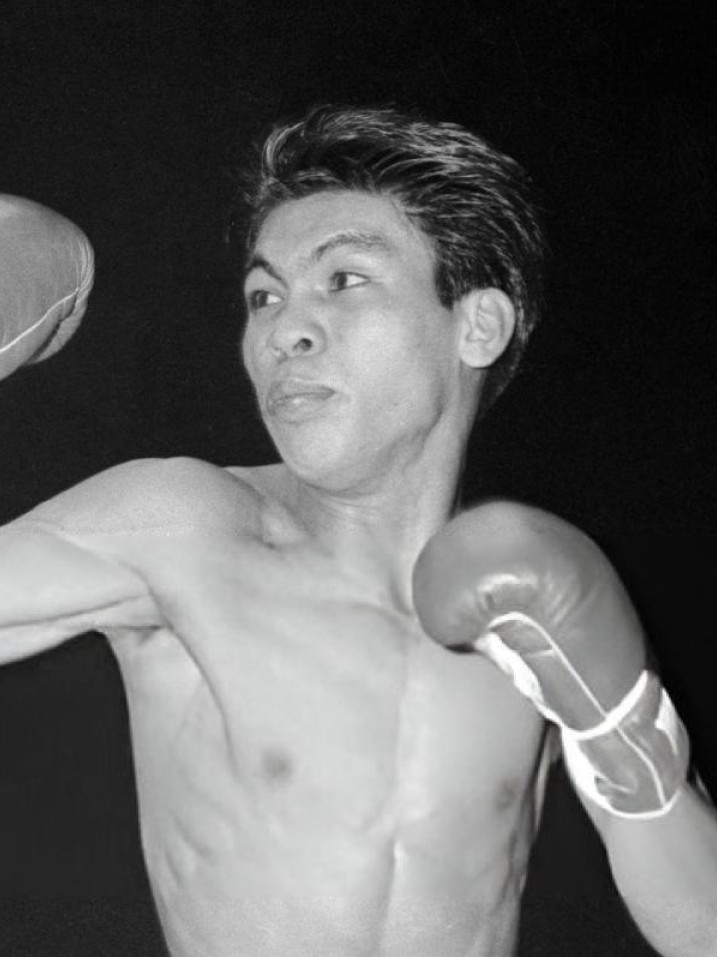
- Elorde in 1956, during his second fight against Sandy Saddler

Personal information
- Nickname: Flash
- Nationality: (Philippines) Filipino
- Born: Gabriel Elorde; March 25, 1935 Bogo, Cebu, Philippines
- Died: January 2, 1985 (aged 49) Quezon City, Philippines
- Height: 5 ft 5 1/2 in (166 cm)
- Weight: Bantamweight; Featherweight; Super featherweight; Lightweight

Boxing career
- Reach: 68 in (173 cm)
- Stance: Southpaw

Boxing record
- Total fights: 118
- Wins: 89
- Win by KO: 33
- Losses: 27
- Draws: 2
- No contests: 0

Gabriel "Flash" Elorde (March 25, 1935 – January 2, 1985) was a Filipino professional boxer. He won the lineal super featherweight title in 1960. In 1963, he won the inaugural WBC and WBA super featherweight titles. He holds the record at super featherweight division for the longest title reign, spanning seven years. Elorde is considered one of the best Filipino boxers of all time along with eight-division champion Manny Pacquiao and Pancho Villa, flyweight champion in the 1920s. He was much beloved in the Philippines as a sports and cultural icon, being the first Filipino international boxing champion since middleweight champion Ceferino Garcia.

== Fighting style ==
A southpaw, Flash Elorde was known for his boxing skills and speed. Writer Robert Lipsyte once described his style as the "subtle little temple-dancer moves". He learned Balintawak Eskrima from his father "Tatang" Elorde who was the Eskrima champion of Bohol, from whom he learned his footwork and maneuvers. Elorde's style, derived from eskrima, has been adopted by many boxers, including boxing legend and friend Muhammad Ali.

== Early life ==
Gabriel Elorde was born in the town of Bogo, Cebu. The youngest of 15 children, he came from a poor family.

Elorde finished only the 3rd grade of his elementary education and was forced to drop out due to extreme poverty. He then began to work as a bearer of bowling balls and, besides this, as a carpenter.

His love for boxing came from a friend, Lucio Laborte, a former professional boxer. Laborte taught him how to box, and Elorde quickly learned the sport and pursued his dream to become a boxer. At the time he was only 16 years old.

== Professional career ==
Elorde made his professional debut at the age of 16 on June 16, 1951, against Kid Gonzaga. The bout was held in Cebu, Philippines. The boxing newcomer stopped his foe in the 4th round.

Within a year, Elorde was able to win the national bantamweight title. His potential was evident: he was a southpaw whose major asset was his quick hands and relentless body attack on his opponents.

In his first 14 fights, he suffered 2 defeats and 1 draw before coming into his own. He defeated Tanny Campo and Hiroshi Horiguchi both in 12-round decisions to win the Philippine and Asian bantamweight titles. He also outpointed all-time great world featherweight champion Sandy Saddler in 1955 in a non-title bout.

In 1956, he was given a rematch with Saddler, this time with Saddler's featherweight title on the line. However, Elorde suffered a cut in his eye and lost the fight on a 13th-round TKO. Many boxing experts criticized Saddler, known as a very rough and vicious fighter, for the result of the bout. Jack Fiske of the San Francisco Chronicle wrote: "It was a dirty fight throughout and all the onus must be on the 126-pound champion's skinny shoulders. From this corner, it appeared highly improbable that he could have successfully defended the title ... if he hadn't resorted to all the so-called tricks in and out of the rule book."

He won the world super featherweight title on March 16, 1960, by knocking out the defending world champion Harold Gomes in seven rounds. That night, Elorde ended the country's 20-year world championship drought. The crowd estimated to be around 30,000, inside the newly built Araneta Coliseum, rushed into the ring after seeing Gomes go down to his knees at the one-minute-50-second mark of the seventh round. The event happened two decades after compatriot Ceferino Garcia, known as the father of the 'bolo punch', lost the middleweight division he lorded over until 1940.

Elorde floored Gomes in the second round with a right hook to the head. The Filipino challenger knocked down the 25-year-old Gomes again in the third and in the fifth, sending him over the ring's lower rope at the end of the round. In the next round, Gomes mounted a brief comeback, but at the start of the seventh, Elorde hammered him again, connecting with rights to the head followed by a left to the jaw that sent him down once more. Gomes got up but was floored again after receiving a combination of lefts and rights. He then met a series of combinations that led the referee Barney Ross to count him out. When Gomes recovered, he went to Elorde's corner and whispered: "It was a good fight".

He defended the crown 10 times notably against Sergio Caprari, Terou Kosaka, Johnny Bizzaro, Kang-Il Suh & Love Allotey until June 15, 1967, where he lost a majority decision to Yoshiaki Numata of Japan. This made him the longest-reigning world junior lightweight champion ever (seven years and three months).

Elorde also challenged lightweight Carlos Ortiz for his world title on two occasions. He was stopped both times by Ortiz in the 14th round.

Elorde retired with a record of 88 wins (33 KOs), 27 losses and 2 draws. He is considered the greatest super featherweight champion of all time in WBC history.

== Other ventures ==
=== Acting ===
Elorde's successful career in boxing made him into a celebrity, leading him to appear in a number of film productions such as the 1961 autobiographical movie The Flash Elorde Story where he played as himself, and in the Fernando Poe, Jr. vehicles Kapag Buhay ang Inutang (1962) and Mano-mano (1964) where he starred alongside Dolphy.

After his retirement, Elorde remained in the Philippines within the public eye. He was a prominent commercial endorser, especially for San Miguel Beer. In fact, his San Miguel Beer TV commercial (together with Bert Marcelo and Rico J. Puno), wherein he famously said the words ".... isang platitong mani" (one plate of peanuts), during 1980's it was named as one of the top ten most renowned Filipino advertisement of all time. Another commercial showed him saying the popular line "Wag namang bara-bara, Bay."

== Personal life ==
He was married to Laura Elorde in Tokyo in 1954. Her father Lope Sarreal, Sr. (born September 25, 1905 – March 14, 1995) from Imus, Cavite is enshrined in the International Boxing Hall of Fame in Canastota, New York. His sons Gabriel Jr. (Bebot), Marty and Johnny went into the world of boxing as promoters and managers. His daughters, as well as the rest of his family have been in the boxing industry since the death of the great "Flash". As a family, they have expanded the Elorde name into becoming a brand. They have made merchandise and gyms throughout the country. International endeavors are still being considered. Gabriel's widow Laura Elorde died at age 92 in May 2020 at Elorde Sports Complex in Sucat, Parañaque. She is survived by 20 grandchildren and 11 great-grandchildren.

== Death ==
" Worthy of the highest esteem and adulation. His humble beginnings did not deter him from attaining ring supremacy but instead propelled him in his quest for glory not only for himself but for his country and people."

— President Ferdinand Marcos A message of condolence January 1985

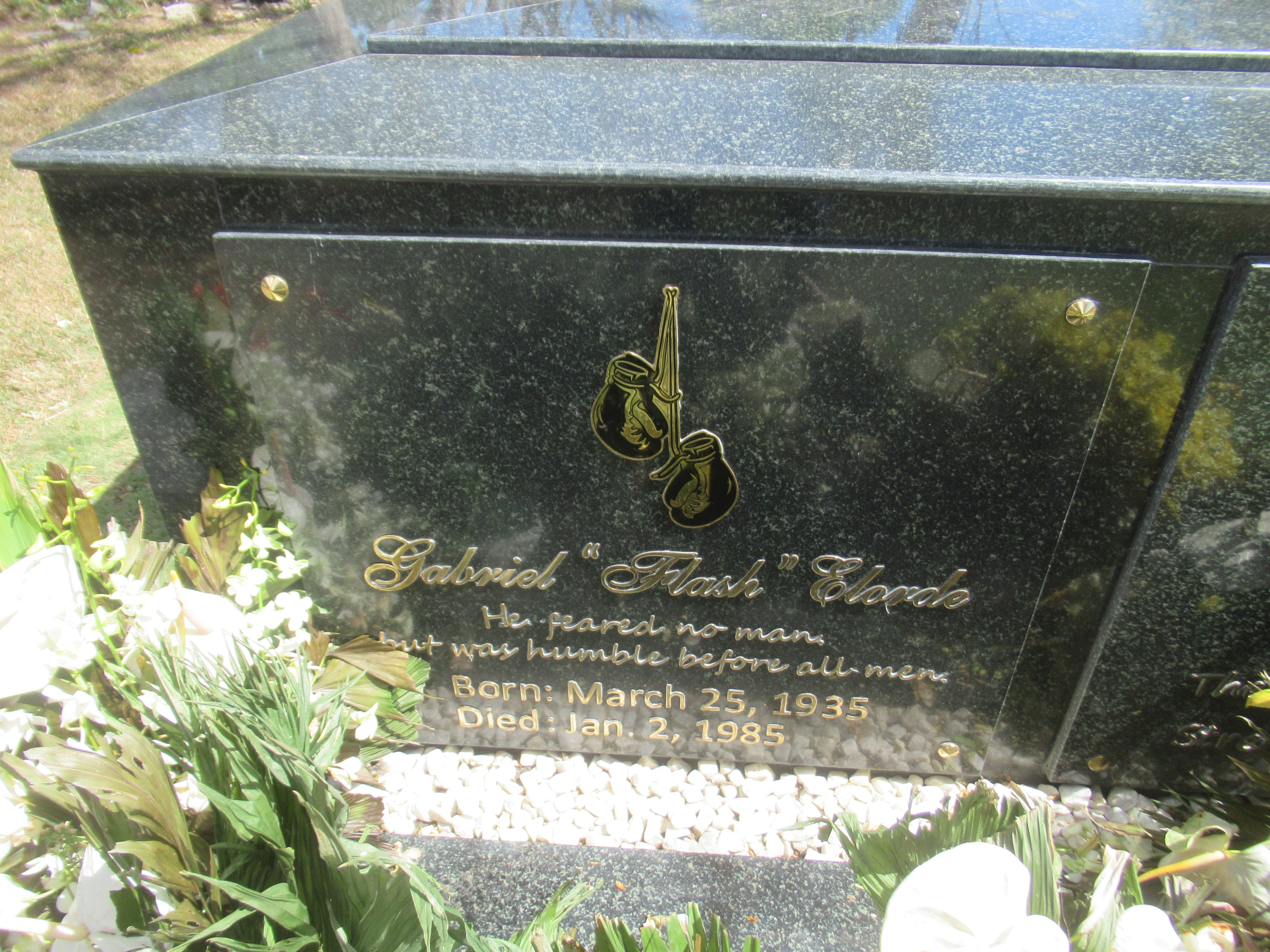
Elorde's grave at Manila Memorial Park – Sucat.

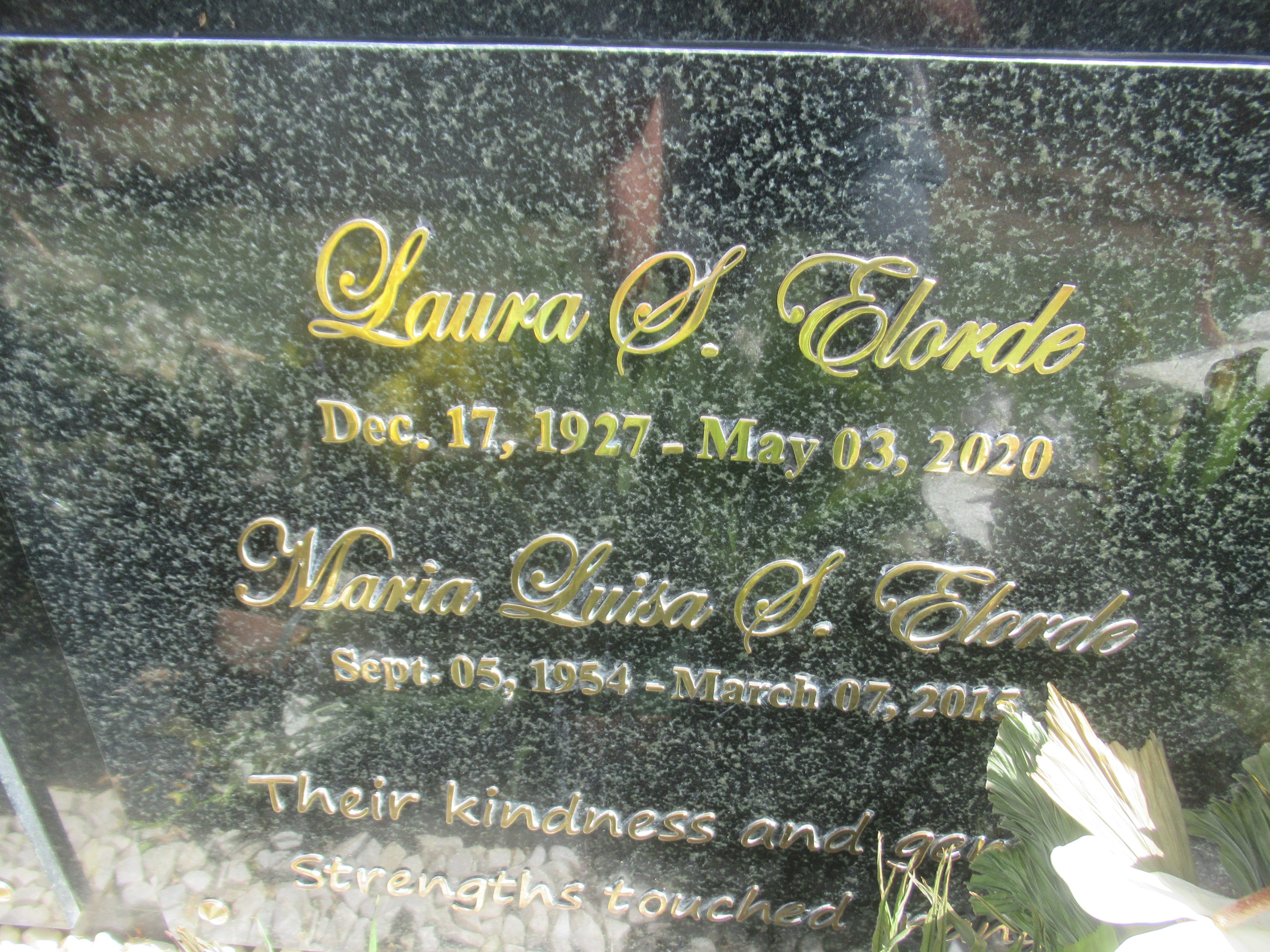
Laura Elorde's grave at Manila Memorial Park – Sucat.

Elorde died on January 2, 1985 (one day after New Year's Day 1985 celebrations) at the age of 49. Elorde had been in and out of the hospital since a cancerous left lung was discovered. Doctors said he had become a chain smoker since he gave up boxing in 1971. He and his wife Laura were buried at Manila Memorial Park - Sucat

== Legacy ==
In 1993, he became the first Asian inducted into the New York-based International Boxing Hall of Fame. He was also enshrined into the World Boxing Hall of Fame. Elorde was also voted the 78th best fighter by the Ring Magazine's writers in 2002 when the Ring Magazine's list of the 80 Best Fighters of the Last 80 Years was released.

On March 25, 2010, Elorde's family, headed by his widow Laura, commemorated his 25th death anniversary and 75th birth anniversary. They also celebrated his historical win against defending WBA junior-lightweight champion Harold Gomes that ended the RP's 20-year world championship drought.

Filipino boxers Brian Viloria, Donnie Nietes, Rodel Mayol, Marvin Sonsona and Gerry Peñalosa received an award for their contributions. Z Gorres also attended the event. Manny Pacquiao was also a special guest in the ceremony. The Gabriel "Flash" Elorde Memorial Boxing Awards & Banquet was launched in 2000 honoring the former and current boxers in the Philippines living or posthumously celebrating their victories throughout held every year.

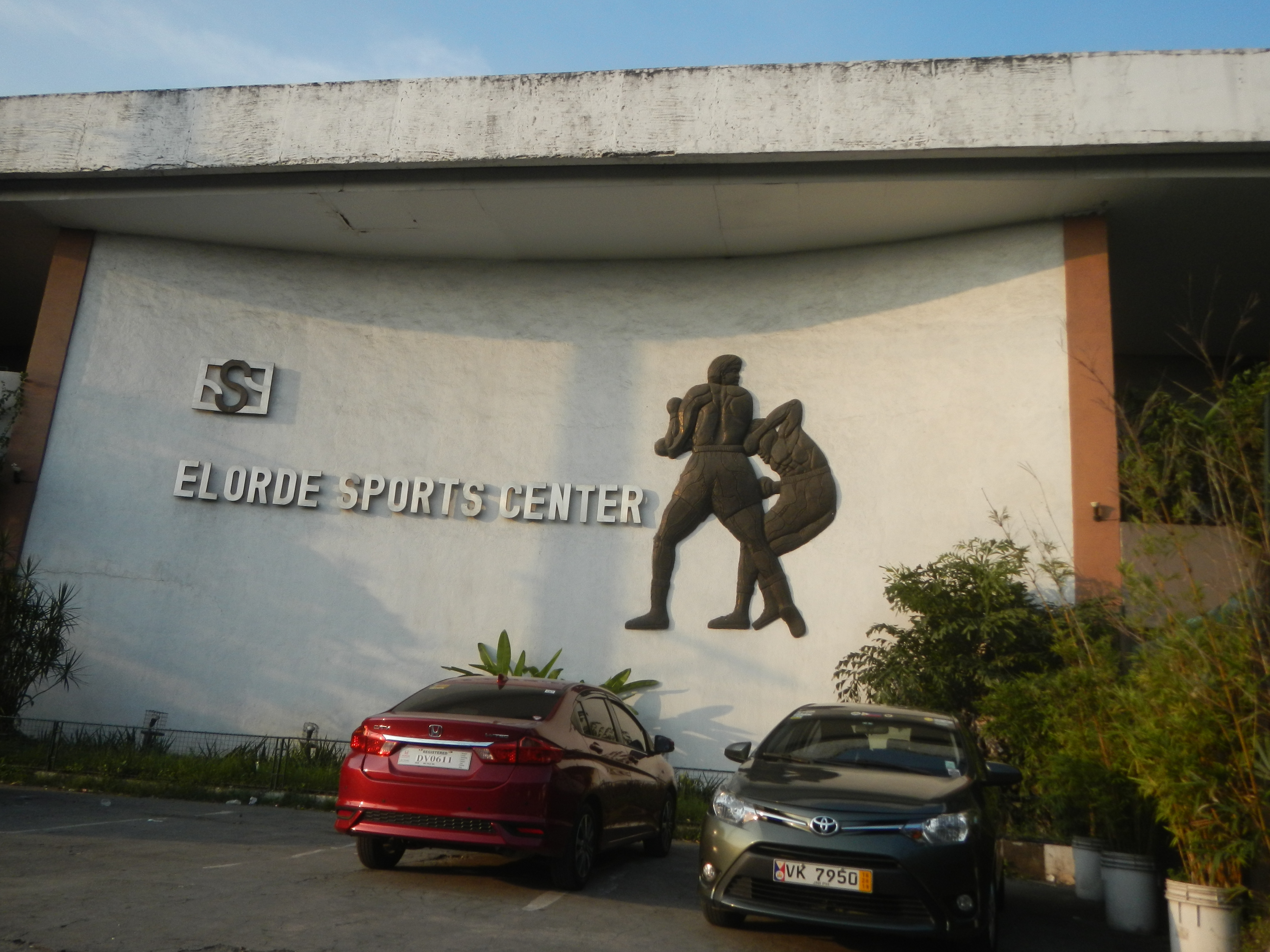
The Elorde Sports Center in Parañaque, Metro Manila, Philippines.

The Elorde Sports Center in Parañaque, founded in 1983 (two years before his death in 1985), was dedicated to him. It hosts boxing matches and future fights. It has expanded with branches in Metro Manila and nationwide.

Author James Ellroy, an avid boxing fan, named a character in his novel American Tabloid after Elorde.

== Filmography ==
- The Flash Elorde Story (1961)
- Kapag Buhay ang Inutang (1962)
- Ang Tatay Kong Kalbo (1963)
- Mano-mano (1964)
- Palad Ta ang Nagbuot (1969)
- Pamilya Dimagiba (1982)

== Professional boxing record ==
118 fights	89 wins	27 losses
By knockout	33	4
By decision	55	23
By disqualification	1	0
Draws	2	

No.	Result	Record	Opponent	Type	Round, time	Date	Location	Notes
118	Loss	89–27–2	Hiruyuki Murakami	UD	10	20 May 1971	Tokyo, Japan	
117	Win	89–26–2	Shunkichi Suemitsu	UD	10	1 Apr 1971	Manila, Metro Manila, Philippines	
116	Win	88–26–2	Isao Ichihara	KO	6 (10)	12 Feb 1971	Manila, Metro Manila, Philippines	
115	Loss	87–26–2	Isao Ichihara	UD	10	18 Dec 1970	Recreation Center, Agana, Guam	
114	Win	87–25–2	Tatsunao Mitsuyama	UD	10	31 Oct 1970	Davao City, Davao del Sur, Philippines	
113	Win	86–25–2	Chico Andrade	TKO	5 (10)	28 Aug 1970	Araneta Coliseum, Quezon City, Metro Manila, Philippines	
112	Win	85–25–2	Kenji Iwata	TKO	10	27 Jun 1970	Manila, Metro Manila, Philippines	
111	Win	84–25–2	Isao Ichihara	KO	9 (10)	16 May 1970	Manila, Metro Manila, Philippines	
110	Win	83–25–2	Munchai Rorfortor	TKO	5 (10), 2:54	1 Mar 1970	Manila, Metro Manila, Philippines	
109	Loss	82–25–2	Jaguar Kakizawa	UD	10	26 Apr 1969	Araneta Coliseum, Quezon City, Metro Manila, Philippines	
108	Loss	82–24–2	Eugenio Espinoza	UD	10	16 Feb 1969	Quito, Ecuador	
107	Loss	82–23–2	Akihisa Someya	UD	10	28 Oct 1967	Manila, Metro Manila, Philippines	
106	Loss	82–22–2	Yoshiaki Numata	MD	15	15 Jun 1967	Kokugikan, Tokyo, Japan	Lost WBA, WBC, and The Ring super featherweight titles
105	Win	82–21–2	Fujio Mikami	SD	10	25 Apr 1967	Honolulu, Hawaii, U.S.	
104	Loss	81–21–2	Carlos Ortiz	KO	14 (15), 2:01	28 Nov 1966	Madison Square Garden, New York, New York City, U.S.	For WBA, WBC, and The Ring lightweight titles
103	Win	81–20–2	Vicente Milan Derado	MD	15	22 Oct 1966	Araneta Coliseum, Quezon City, Metro Manila, Philippines	Retained WBA, WBC, and The Ring super featherweight titles
102	Win	80–20–2	Percy Hayles	UD	10	7 Aug 1966	Araneta Coliseum, Quezon City, Metro Manila, Philippines	
101	Loss	79–20–2	Yoshiaki Numata	UD	12	9 Jun 1969	Nihon University Auditorium, Tokyo, Japan	
100	Win	79–19–2	Ismael Laguna	UD	10	19 Mar 1966	Araneta Coliseum, Quezon City, Metro Manila, Philippines	
99	Win	78–19–2	Kang-Il Suh	UD	10	4 Dec 1965	Araneta Coliseum, Quezon City, Metro Manila, Philippines	Retained WBA, WBC, and The Ring super featherweight titles
98	Win	77–19–2	Frankie Narvaez	SD	10	4 Aug 1965	Madison Square Garden, New York, New York City, U.S.	
97	Win	76–19–2	Teruo Kosaka	KO	15 (15), 2:14	5 Jun 1965	Araneta Coliseum, Quezon City, Metro Manila, Philippines	Retained WBA, WBC, and The Ring super featherweight titles
96	Win	75–19–2	Rene Barrientos	UD	12	27 Feb 1965	Cebu Coliseum, Cebu City, Cebu, Philippines	
95	Win	74–19–2	Kang-Il Suh	MD	12	21 Nov 1964	Araneta Coliseum, Quezon City, Metro Manila, Philippines	
94	Win	73–19–2	Teruo Kosaka	TKO	12 (15), 1:45	27 Jul 1964	Kokugikan, Tokyo, Japan	Retained WBA, WBC, and The Ring super featherweight titles
93	Win	72–19–2	Takashi Matsumoto	UD	12	8 May 1964	Araneta Coliseum, Quezon City, Metro Manila, Philippines	
92	Loss	71–19–2	Carlos Ortiz	TKO	14 (15), 1:44	15 Feb 1964	Rizal Memorial Sports Complex, Manila, Metro Manila	For WBA, WBC, and The Ring lightweight titles
91	Win	71–18–2	Love Allotey	DQ	11 (15), 1:44	16 Nov 1963	Araneta Coliseum, Quezon City, Metro Manila, Philippines	Retained WBA, WBC, and The Ring super featherweight titles
90	Win	70–18–2	Love Allotey	UD	10	3 Aug 1963	Araneta Coliseum, Quezon City, Metro Manila, Philippines	
89	Win	69–18–2	Tsunetomi Miyamoto	TKO	9 (12), 0:45	1 Jun 1963	Manila, Metro Manila, Philippines	
88	Win	68–18–2	Johnny Bizzaro	UD	15	16 Feb 1963	Manila, Metro Manila, Philippines	Retained WBA and The Ring super featherweight titles; Won inaugural WBC super featherweight title
87	Win	67–18–2	Solomon Boysaw	UD	10	21 Dec 1962	Araneta Coliseum, Quezon City, Metro Manila, Philippines	
86	Win	66–18–2	Isarasak Puntainorasing	TKO	3 (12)	17 Nov 1962	Manila, Metro Manila, Philippines	
85	Win	65–18–2	Teruo Kosaka	UD	12	4 Aug 1962	Cebu Coliseum, Cebu City, Cebu, Philippines	
84	Win	64–18–2	Auburn Copeland	MD	15	23 Jun 1962	Rizal Memorial Sports Complex, Manila, Metro Manila, Philippines	Retained NBA super featherweight title
83	Loss	63–18–2	Teruo Kosaka	SD	12	30 Apr 1962	Korakuen Gym, Tokyo, Japan	
82	Win	63–17–2	Somkiat Kiatmuangyom	KO	2 (12)	10 Mar 1962	Rizal Memorial Sports Complex, Manila, Metro Manila, Philippines	
81	Win	62–17–2	Sergio Caprari	TKO	1 (15), 2:22	6 Dec 1961	Rizal Memorial Sports Complex, Manila, Metro Manila, Philippines	Retained NBA super featherweight title
80	Win	61–17–2	Teruo Kosaka	SD	12	2 Sep 1961	Rizal Memorial Sports Complex, Manila, Metro Manila, Philippines	
79	Win	60–17–2	Giordano Campari	UD	10	31 May 1961	Araneta Coliseum, Quezon City, Metro Manila, Philippines	
78	Win	59–17–2	Joey Lopes	UD	15	19 Mar 1961	Manila, Metro Manila, Philippines	Retained NBA super featherweight title
77	Win	58–17–2	Vicente Rivas	UD	10	16 Dec 1960	Araneta Coliseum, Quezon City, Metro Manila, Philippines	
76	Win	57–17–2	Sakuji Shinozawa	UD	12	17 Oct 1960	Rizal Memorial Sports Complex, Manila, Metro Manila, Philippines	
75	Win	56–17–2	Harold Gomes	KO	1 (15), 1:20	17 Aug 1960	Cow Palace, Daly City, California, U.S.	Retained NBA super featherweight title
74	Win	55–17–2	Hachiro Ito	TKO	5 (15), 2:43	9 Jul 1960	Araneta Coliseum, Quezon City, Metro Manila, Philippines	
73	Win	54–17–2	Harold Gomes	KO	7 (15), 1:50	16 Mar 1960	Araneta Coliseum, Quezon City, Metro Manila, Philippines	Won NBA super featherweight title
72	Win	53–17–2	Bert Somodio	UD	10	15 Dec 1959	Rizal Memorial Sports Complex, Manila, Metro Manila, Philippines	
71	Win	52–17–2	Isami Ikeyama	RTD	4 (10), 3:00	26 Nov 1959	Nihon University Auditorium, Tokyo, Japan	
70	Win	51–17–2	Hisao Kobayashi	PTS	12	7 Oct 1959	Tokyo, Japan	
69	Loss	50–17–2	Solomon Boysaw	UD	12	29 Jul 1959	Arena, Cleveland, Ohio, U.S.	
68	Loss	50–16–2	Vicente Rivas	PTS	10	15 Jun 1959	Caracas, Venezuela	
67	Win	50–15–2	Sonny Leon	PTS	10	25 May 1959	Nuevo Circo, Caracas, Venezuela	
66	Win	49–15–2	Teddy Davis	UD	10	31 Mar 1959	Civic Auditorium, Stockton, California, U.S.	
65	Loss	48–15–2	Paolo Rosi	SD	10	23 Feb 1959	Cow Palace, Daly City, California, U.S.	
64	Win	48–14–2	Takeo Sugimori	PTS	10	6 Feb 1959	Nihon University Auditorium, Tokyo, Japan	Retained OPBF lightweight title
63	Win	47–14–2	Kiyoaki Nakanishi	TKO	4 (10)	27 Dec 1958	Davao City, Davao del Sur, Philippines	
62	Win	46–14–2	Keiichi Ishikawa	RTD	6 (12), 3:00	15 Nov 1958	Rizal Memorial Sports Complex, Manila, Metro Manila, Philippines	Retained OPBF lightweight title
61	Win	45–14–2	Hisao Kobayashi	PTS	12	2 Sep 1958	Tokyo, Japan	Retained OPBF lightweight title
60	Win	44–14–2	Ike Chestnut	UD	10	10 Jun 1958	Honolulu Stadium, Honolulu, Hawaii, U.S.	
59	Win	43–14–2	Javellana Kid	UD	10	3 May 1958	Rizal Memorial Sports Complex, Manila, Metro Manila, Philippines	Retained OPBF lightweight title
58	Win	42–14–2	Hiroshi Okawa	UD	10	2 Feb 1958	Tokyo, Japan	Won OPBF lightweight title
57	Win	41–14–2	Leo Alonzo	UD	12	23 Oct 1957	Rizal Memorial Sports Complex, Manila, Metro Manila, Japa	
56	Loss	40–14–2	Shigeji Kaneko	MD	10	24 Sep 1957	Metropolitan Gym, Tokyo, Japan	
55	Win	40–13–2	Salika Yontrakit	KO	3 (10), 0:58	3 Aug 1957	Bangkok, Thailand	
54	Loss	39–13–2	Omsap Laemfapha	PTS	12	23 Jun 1957	Bangkok, Thailand	Lost OPBF lightweight title
53	Win	39–12–2	Hideto Kobayashi	PTS	12	27 Apr 1957	Nagoya, Aichi, Japan	Won vacant OPBF lightweight title
52	Win	38–12–2	Tommy Romulo	UD	12	16 Mar 1957	Rizal Memorial Sports Complex, Manila, Metro Manila, Philippines	Won Philippines Games and Amusement Board lightweight title
51	Win	37–12–2	Hidemi Wada	KO	5 (10), 1:50	5 Feb 1957	Osaka, Japan	
50	Loss	36–12–2	Miguel Berrios	UD	10	9 Nov 1956	Madison Square Garden, New York, New York City, U.S.	
49	Win	36–11–2	Luke Sandoval	KO	2 (10)	16 Oct 1956	Civic Auditorium, San Jose, California, U.S.	
48	Loss	35–11–2	Miguel Berrios	SD	10	22 Aug 1956	San Francisco Gardens, San Francisco, California, U.S.	
47	Win	35–10–2	Dave Gallardo	UD	10	24 Jul 1956	San Jose, California, U.S.	
46	Win	34–10–2	Cecil Schoonmaker	KO	9 (10), 0:27	26 Jun 1956	Stockton, California, U.S.	
45	Win	33–10–2	Gil Velarde	TKO	7 (10), 2:58	11 Jun 1956	San Francisco Gardens, San Francisco, California, U.S.	
44	Win	32–10–2	Chico Rosa	PTS	10	8 May 1956	Civic Auditorium, Stockton, California, U.S.	
43	Win	31–10–2	Cleo Lane	TKO	1 (10), 2:26	23 Apr 1956	San Francisco Gardens, San Francisco, California, U.S.	
42	Loss	30–10–2	Sandy Saddler	TKO	13 (15), 0:59	18 Jan 1956	Cow Palace, Daly City, California, U.S.	For NBA, NYSAC, and The Ring featherweight titles
41	Loss	30–9–2	Shigeji Kaneko	PTS	10	13 Oct 1955	Tokyo, Japan	
40	Win	30–8–2	Sandy Saddler	UD	10	20 Jul 1955	Rizal Memorial Sports Complex, Manila, Metro Manila, Philippines	
39	Loss	29–8–2	Leo Alonzo	SD	12	15 Jun 1955	Rizal Memorial Sports Complex, Manila, Metro Manila, Philippines	Lost Philippines Games and Amusement Board lightweight title
38	Win	29–7–2	Severino Fuentes	PTS	10	15 Apr 1955	Bullfight Arena, Manila, Metro Manila, Philippines	
37	Loss	28–7–2	Masashi Akiyama	PTS	10	12 Jan 1955	Metropolitan Gym, Tokyo, Japan	
36	Win	28–6–2	Masashi Akiyama	PTS	10	27 Nov 1954	Manila, Metro Manila, Philippines	
35	Win	27–6–2	Katsumi Kosaka	TKO	8 (12), 1:55	20 Nov 1954	Rizal Memorial Sports Complex, Manila, Metro Manila, Philippines	
34	Win	26–6–2	Yoichi Hayashi	PTS	8	2 Nov 1954	Prefectural Gymnasium, Osaka, Osaka, Japan	
33	Win	25–6–2	Tommy Romulo	PTS	12	18 Aug 1954	Manila, Metro Manila, Philippines	Won Philippines Games and Amusement Board lightweight title
32	Win	24–6–2	Roy Higa	UD	10	5 Aug 1954	Korakuen Ice Palace, Tokyo, Japan	
31	Loss	23–6–2	Shigeji Kaneko	UD	12	29 Jun 1954	Metropolitan Gym, Tokyo, Japan	For OPBF featherweight title
30	Win	23–5–2	Hiroshi Okawa	UD	12	21 Apr 1954	Kokugikan, Tokyo, Japan	
29	Win	22–5–2	Kiyoaki Nakanishi	UD	12	28 Jan 1954	Kokugikan, Tokyo, Japan	
28	Loss	21–5–2	Masashi Akiyama	UD	10	26 Nov 1953	Kokugikan, Tokyo, Japan	For Japanese lightweight title
27	Win	21–4–2	Noboru Tanaka	PTS	10	8 Oct 1953	Korakuen Gym, Tokyo, Japan	
26	Loss	20–4–2	Shigeji Kaneko	PTS	10	8 Aug 1953	Koshien Baseball Stadium, Nishinomiya, Hyogo, Japan	
25	Win	20–3–2	Akiyoshi Akanuma	UD	12	1 Jul 1953	Korakuen Ice Palace, Tokyo, Japan	Retained OPBF bantamweight title
24	Loss	19–3–2	Larry Bataan	PTS	12	20 May 1953	Manila, Metro Manila, Philippines	For OPBF featherweight title
23	Win	19–2–2	Al Cruz	PTS	10	15 Mar 1953	Manila, Metro Manila, Philippines	
22	Win	18–2–2	Willie Brown	TKO	4	18 Feb 1953	Rizal Memorial Coliseum, Manila, Metro Manila, Philippines	
21	Draw	17–2–2	Akiyoshi Akanuma	PTS	10	29 Nov 1952	Kokugikan, Tokyo, Japan	
20	Win	17–2–1	Hiroshi Horiguchi	SD	12	18 Oct 1952	Kokugikan, Tokyo, Japan	Won vacant OPBF bantamweight title
19	Win	16–2–1	Little Dundee	KO	4 (12)	12 Aug 1952	Davao City, Davao del Sur, Philippines	
18	Win	15–2–1	Tanny Campo	PTS	12	26 Jul 1952	Rizal Memorial Coliseum, Manila, Metro Manila, Philippines	
17	Win	14–2–1	Tanny Campo	PTS	8	31 May 1952	Grace Park Stadium, Caloocan, Metro Manila, Philippines	
16	Win	13–2–1	Paulito Escarlan	PTS	6	10 May 1952	Grace Park Stadium, Caloocan, Metro Manila, Philippines	
15	Win	12–2–1	Benny Escobar	PTS	8	3 May 1952	Caloocan, Metro Manila, Philippines	
14	Draw	11–2–1	Tommy Romulo	PTS	10	16 Mar 1952	Davao City, Davao del Sur, Philippines	
13	Loss	11–2	Little Dundee	PTS	8	24 Feb 1952	Davao City, Davao del Sur, Philippines	
12	Win	11–1	Tenejeros Boy	PTS	8	30 Jan 1952	Davao City, Davao del Sur, Philippines	
11	Win	10–1	Lucky Strike	KO	5	1 Dec 1951	Cebu, Philippines	
10	Loss	9–1	Kid Independence	KO	10 (10)	16 Oct 1951	Cebu, Philippines	
9	Win	9–0	Star Flores	PTS	10	15 Sep 1951	Cebu, Philippines	
8	Win	8–0	Little Patilla	KO	6	8 Sep 1951	Cebu, Philippines	
7	Win	7–0	Fighting Chavez	KO	7	20 Aug 1951	Cebu, Philippines	
6	Win	6–0	Fighting Chavez	KO	1	11 Aug 1951	Cebu, Philippines	
5	Win	5–0	Star Mercado	KO	1	28 Jul 1951	Cebu, Philippines	
4	Win	4–0	Kid Santos	KO	5	14 Jul 1951	Cebu, Philippines	
3	Win	3–0	Mike Sanchez	PTS	5	14 Jul 1951	Cebu, Philippines	
2	Win	2–0	Young Basiliano	KO	3	23 Jun 1951	Cebu, Philippines	
1	Win	1–0	Kid Gonzaga	KO	3	16 Jun 1951	Cebu, Philippines	

== Titles in boxing ==
=== Major world titles ===
- NBA (WBA) super featherweight champion (Note: The NBA was renamed the WBA during his reign.) (130 lbs)
- WBC super featherweight champion (Note: Inaugural champion.) (130 lbs)

=== The Ring magazine titles ===
- The Ring super featherweight champion (130 lbs)

=== Regional/International titles ===
- OPBF bantamweight champion (118 lbs)
- OPBF lightweight champion (135 lbs) (2×)
- Philippines Games and Amusements Board lightweight champion (135 lbs) (2×)

=== Undisputed titles ===
- Undisputed super featherweight champion

== Boxing Hall of Fame ==
- World Boxing Hall of Fame Inductee: 1988
- Philippine Sports Hall of Fame Inductee: 2010

Filipinos in the International Boxing Hall of Fame

Number	Name	Year inducted	Notes
1	Flash Elorde	1993	NBA Super featherweight (130), The Ring Super Featherweight (130), & WBC Super featherweight (130) Champion. the first Filipino boxer who ever inducted on the International Boxing Hall of Fame. Holds the record at super featherweight division for longest title reign, spanning seven years. "Modern inductee"
2	Pancho Villa	1994	NYSAC Flyweight (112), NBA Flyweight (112), The Ring Flyweight (112) Champion. First Filipino/Asian World Champion. "Old-timer inductee"
3	Lope Sarreal	2005	Asia's leading promoter, manager, and international booking agent in the years that followed World War II. Also Known as the "Grand Old Man of Philippine Boxing" produced 22 world champions during his illustrious career."Non-participants"
4	Manny Pacquiao	2025	First and only boxer to win twelve major world titles in eight different weight divisions –Flyweight (112), Super bantamweight (122), Featherweight (126), Super featherweight (130), Lightweight (135), Light welterweight (140), Welterweight (147) & Super welterweight (154), his achievements remain unparallel in the history of boxing. Also became the oldest welterweight champion in 2019 with a win against WBA champ Keith Thurman."Modern inductee"

= Indicates the person is no longer alive

== See also ==
- List of world super-featherweight boxing champions
- List of Filipino boxing world champions
- Suntukan

== Notes and references ==
=== References ===
Sporting positions
World boxing titles
Inaugural Champion	WBA Super featherweight champion February 16, 1963 – June 15, 1967	Succeeded by Yoshiaki Numata
Inaugural Champion	WBC Super featherweight champion February 16, 1963 – June 15, 1967	Succeeded by Yoshiaki Numata
Vacant Title last held by Benny Bass	Undisputed Super featherweight champion February 16, 1963 – June 15, 1967	Succeeded by Yoshiaki Numata
Vacant Title last held by Kid Chocolate	The Ring Super featherweight champion 1962 – June 15, 1967	Succeeded by Yoshiaki Numata
