= Antonio Gómez (boxer) =

Venezuelan boxer (born 1944)

Antonio Gomez
Personal information
- Nickname: El León de Cumana
- Born: 7 September 1945 (age 80) Cumaná, Venezuela
- Height: 168 cm (5 ft 6 in)
- Weight: Featherweight

Boxing career

Boxing record
- Total fights: 52
- Wins: 43
- Win by KO: 20
- Losses: 7
- Draws: 2

Antonio Gomez (born 30 September 1944) is a Venezuelan former professional boxer who fought in the featherweight division. He won the WBA world featherweight title in 1971.

== Professional career ==
Gomez made his professional debut on 28 February 1967 against Eduardo Blanco in Caracas. After scoring a knockout over Blanco, Gomez won six fights, all in Caracas, before Domingo Bastidas became the first man to beat him—scoring a third-round knockout in their 2 September 1967 contest. Gomez managed a run of eleven victories before losing to Gustavo Briceno, for his second defeat, on 4 November 1968. On 10 November 1969 Gomez defeated future Light Welterweight world champion Antonio Cervantes.

Gomez fought for the first time outside of Venezuela on 12 February 1970, when he travelled to Inglewood, California, to beat Gil Noriega by an eighth-round knockout. It was in Inglewood, on 5 September 1970, that Gomez won his first title, as he beat Fernando Sotelo for the NABF featherweight title. Gomez won four more fights, one in Mexico and three in Venezuela, before making his first world title challenge.

On 2 September 1971 Gomez travelled to Tokyo to successfully challenge the Japanese WBA world featherweight champion Shozo Saijo. Gomez knocked Saijo down three times in the fifth round before the referee called a halt to the action. Following this fight Gomez won a non-title bout over future lightweight champion Esteban De Jesus before losing a disputed decision to Raul Martinez Mora—also in a non-title fight.

The rematch between Gomez and Mora occurred on 5 February 1972—this time for the WBA title. Gomez knocked Mora down twice in the third round before ending the fight with a seventh-round knockout to retain his title. In the next defence of his title Gomez fought the Panamanian challenger Ernesto Marcel in Maracay. Gomez finished the fight with a bloody face as he lost his title to Marcel by a majority decision.

Gomez fought to a draw with Hyun Kim before travelling to Panama City to face Marcel in a rematch for the WBA title. Marcel, watched by 15,000 fans, dominated the fight and Gomez suffered so much punishment that he was unable to continue for the twelfth round. Gomez fought six more times before his final professional fight on 1 November 1975—when he fought to a draw with Miguel Betruz.

Achievements
Preceded by Shozo Saijo	WBA Featherweight Champion; 2 September 1971 – 19 August 1972	Succeeded by Ernesto Marcel
