= Ernesto Marcel =

Panamanian boxer (1948–2020)

Personal information
- Nickname: Ñato (Flat Nose)
- Born: Ernesto Marcel; 23 May 1948 Colón, Panama
- Died: 29 June 2020 (aged 72) Panama City, Panama
- Height: 168 cm (5 ft 6 in)
- Weight: Bantamweight; Featherweight

Boxing career
- Reach: 173 cm (68 in)
- Stance: Orthodox

Boxing record
- Total fights: 46
- Wins: 40
- Win by KO: 23
- Losses: 4
- Draws: 2

Ernesto Marcel (23 May 1948 – 29 June 2020) was a Panamanian professional boxer who competed from 1966 to 1974. He challenged for the WBC featherweight title in 1971 and held the WBA featherweight title from 1972 to 1974.

== Career ==
Making his professional debut as a teenager in 1966, Marcel built up a record of 31–3–1, which included a second round knockout of Bernardo Caraballo, who had previously fought Fighting Harada and Éder Jofre for world titles, and a tenth-round technical knockout loss to a young Roberto Durán, the only stoppage defeat of Marcel's career.

On 11 November 1971, Marcel faced WBC featherweight champion Kuniaki Shibata in Matsuyama, Japan, but the fight was scored a draw, meaning Shibata retained his title. Less than a year later, Marcel defeated Antonio Gómez for the WBA featherweight title, and made three successful defences of the crown. He made his fourth and final defence against Alexis Argüello on 16 February 1974, winning a unanimous decision after fifteen rounds. With a record of 40–4–2, Marcel announced his retirement from boxing after the fight, making him one of only a handful of boxers to retire as a reigning world champion.

Achievements
Preceded by Antonio Gómez	WBA featherweight champion 19 August 1972 – 31 May 1974; Retired	Vacant Title next held by Rubén Olivares
