= Alfredo Marcano =

Venezuelan boxer

Personal information
- Born: January 17, 1947 Cumaná, Venezuela
- Died: April 5, 2009 (aged 62)
- Weight: Super featherweight

Boxing career
- Stance: orthodox

Boxing record
- Total fights: 62
- Wins: 44
- Win by KO: 29
- Losses: 11
- Draws: 5
- No contests: 2

Alfredo Marcano (January 17, 1947 – April 5, 2009) was a Venezuelan professional boxer who competed from 1966 to 1975. He held the world junior lightweight title.

== Professional boxing career ==
During his career, Marcano won the WBA and lineal super featherweight titles. Marcano challenged for the WBA title on July 29, 1971, against Hiroshi Kobayashi. The fight took place in Japan—the home country of the champion. Marcano won the fight with a tenth round technical knockout. After becoming champion, Marcano returned to Venezuela to make his first defence, against the Japanese challenger Kenji Iwata, Marcano once again won with a knockout. It was to be the only defence of his title, as he lost a unanimous decision to Ben Villaflor in his next fight. After the fight Marcano went undefeated until September 1974, when he unsuccessfully challenged Bobby Chacon for the vacant WBC featherweight title—the fight ended in the ninth round with Chacon scoring a knockout. In March 1975 he was knocked out again, this time by Art Hafey, in what was to be his final fight. Maracano died in April 2009 at the age of 62.

== See also ==
- List of super featherweight boxing champions
- List of WBA world champions

Achievements
Preceded by Hiroshi Kobayashi	Lineal Super Featherweight Champion; 1971 Jul 29 – 1972 Apr 25	Succeeded by Ben Villaflor
Preceded by Hiroshi Kobayashi	WBA Super Featherweight Champion; 1971 Jul 29 – 1972 Apr 25	Succeeded by Ben Villaflor
