= Carlos Cañete =

Argentine boxer

Personal information
- Born: 16 July 1940 Buenos Aires, Argentina
- Died: 8 March 2003 (aged 62) Buenos Aires, Argentina

Sport
- Sport: Boxing
Medal record
Men's amateur boxing
Representing Argentina
Pan American Games
Silver medal – second place	1959 Chicago	Bantamweight

Carlos Cañete (16 July 1940 – 8 March 2003) was an Argentine boxer. He competed in the men's bantamweight event at the 1960 Summer Olympics.
