= Love Allotey =

Ghanaian boxer

Personal information
- Nationality: Ghanaian
- Born: Sumoo Pappoe Allotey; 16 December 1936 Accra, Ghana
- Died: 1 April 1996 (aged 59)
- Weight: feather/super feather/light/light welterweight

Boxing career

Boxing record
- Total fights: 69
- Wins: 44 (KO 7)
- Losses: 21 (KO 1)
- Draws: 4

Sumoo Pappoe 'Love' Allotey (16 December 1936- April 1996) was a Ghanaian professional feather/super feather/light/light welterweight boxer of the 1950s, '60s and '70s who won the Ghanaian featherweight title, and British Commonwealth lightweight title, and was a challenger for the British Commonwealth featherweight title against Floyd Robertson, and World Boxing Council (WBC) super featherweight title, and World Boxing Association (WBA) World super featherweight title against Gabriel "Flash" Elorde, his professional fighting weight varied from 124 1/4 lb (56.4 kg; 8 st 12.3 lb), i.e. featherweight to 135 1/2 lb (61.5 kg; 9 st 9.5 lb), i.e. light welterweight.

Allotey was a world traveller, as he fought in fifteen countries, apart from his fights in Ghana, during his professional boxing career.
