= Alfredo Escalera vs. Alexis Argüello =

Boxing competition

The Bloody Battle of Bayamon
- Date: January 28, 1978
- Venue: Juan Ramón Loubriel Stadium, Bayamón, Puerto Rico
- Title(s) on the line: WBC Super Featherweight Championship

Tale of the tape
Boxer	(Puerto Rico) Alfredo Escalera	(Nicaragua) Alexis Argüello
Nickname	El Salsero	El Flaco Explosivo
Hometown	Carolina, Puerto Rico	Managua, Nicaragua
Pre-fight record	40–7–2 (26 KO)	52–4–0 (42 KO)
Height	5 ft 8 in (1.73 m)	5 ft 10 in (1.78 m)
Weight	130 lb (59.0 kg)	129.5 lb (58.7 kg)
Style	Orthodox	Orthodox
Recognition	WBC Super Featherweight Champion	

Result
- Argüello wins by TKO in the thirteenth round

The Bloody Battle of Bayamón was a boxing fight held on January 28, 1978 at Juan Ramón Loubriel Stadium in Bayamón, Puerto Rico, between defending World Boxing Council world Jr. Lightweight champion Alfredo Escalera, and former World Boxing Association world Featherweight champion Alexis Argüello of Nicaragua. It would be their first of two fights.

== Pre-fight ==
Alexis Argüello was born and raised in Managua. He had to fight on the streets as a child to earn money, and became the WBA world Featherweight champion by defeating Rubén Olivares by a thirteenth-round knockout in Los Angeles. Because he defended his Featherweight crown successfully each time he was challenged for the title, Arguello became a mainstream star both in Latin America and the United States.

Escalera is a native of Carolina. Much like Arguello, he learned since he was a child to box and he was a member of a group of boxers from the area, like Wilfred Benítez, Wilfredo Gómez and Esteban De Jesús, to reach international fame status. He was crowned WBC world Jr. Lightweight champion on July 5, 1975 when he knocked Kuniaki Shibata out in the second round in Japan. Escalera proceeded to make ten title defenses before facing Arguello.

When the fight was announced, boxing magazines in the United States, Europe and Latin America began speculating on the fight's outcome. As a consequence, boxing fans beyond Nicaragua and Puerto Rico became interested as well, and television networks from several countries bought the rights to broadcast the bout.

During a press conference before the fight, Bayamón mayor Ramon Luis Rivera presented both fighters with the symbolic key to the city of Bayamón.

== The Fight ==
As the challenger, Arguello entered the ring first. Escalera, as was typical of him, made his entrance to the sounds of salsa music and took a snake wrapped around his neck to the ring.

Arguello started off quickly, dropping Escalera in round two. The champion got up and started answering Arguello's onslaughts with combinations of his own. Arguello felt that he needed to be extra aggressive, fearing that if the fight was a close one, Escalera would be given a points verdict should it go the fifteen round distance because Escalera was fighting in his home country. Unbeknownst to him, he was actually building a points lead on the three judges' scorecards.

Escalera, meanwhile, felt that this was a fight he could win. He had been in difficult fights before, and he had prevailed in those. While Arguello's punches were taking a toll on Escalera's skin, he kept pressing and connecting strong punches on Arguello's body. By the eighth round, however, Escalera had suffered various injuries, such as a broken nose, ear, and teeth, a closed eye and a cut on his tongue.

By round ten, the crowd seemed to feel that Escalera's chances of winning the bout were slipping away. Escalera rebounded, however, and rocked Arguello during the following three rounds, being on the verge of knocking the Nicaraguan out in the twelfth round. Escalera was apparently reinvigorated with the crowd cheering him on again. In addition, Arguello was also bleeding by this point.

In round thirteen, Arguello made one final effort, pounding Escalera with a variety of punches. Escalera began to bleed profusely again from his injuries, and referee Arthur Mercante Sr. stopped the fight, with Arguello winning the WBC world Jr. Lightweight title by a thirteenth-round knockout. The fight was described as "brutal".

== Aftermath ==
Escalera was immediately hospitalized for his injuries after the bout.

Escalera and Arguello had a rematch in Rimini, Italy on February 2, 1979. Arguello prevailed by a 13th round knockout, finishing Escalera with a left hook.

Escalera became a wrestler before returning to boxing, and had a strong comeback as a Lightweight, beating men like Maurice Watkins and Gene Hatcher before suffering a detached retina and retiring from boxing for good in 1983. He currently lives comfortably in Puerto Rico off the money he made as a fighter, and, despite losing his sight for some time due to his retinal problems, he was able to recover it after a successful eye surgery.

Alexis Argüello won the WBC Lightweight title in 1981 by defeating Jim Watt in London, England, becoming only the sixth boxer in history, and the second Hispanic one, to hold world titles in three different divisions. On November 12, 1982, he challenged Aaron Pryor for the WBA world Jr. Welterweight title. Trying to make boxing history by becoming boxing's first four division world champion, Arguello was stopped in round fourteen of that fight. A rematch was held, in September 1983, and Pryor again prevailed, by a tenth-round knockout. Arguello then joined the Contra movement in Nicaragua and was involved in civil war for a few months. He attempted boxing comebacks twice, his last fight being held in 1995. He faced drug problems, which were widely publicized by the press.

After their fights, Arguello and Escalera became good friends.

Arguello became vice-mayor of the city of Managua and expressed interest in running for President of Nicaragua. He was kidnapped at one point during his tenure as vice-mayor, but he was rescued alive. Arguello later became mayor of Managua.

In 2009, Arguello was found dead, having apparently committed suicide.
