= Alfredo Escalera =

Puerto Rican boxer (born 1952)

Personal information
- Nicknames: El Salsero; Petro
- Born: March 21, 1952 (age 74) Carolina, Puerto Rico
- Height: 5 ft 8 in (173 cm)
- Weight: Super featherweight

Boxing career
- Reach: 70 1/2 in (179 cm)
- Stance: Orthodox

Boxing record
- Total fights: 70
- Wins: 53
- Win by KO: 31
- Losses: 14
- Draws: 3

Alfredo "El Salsero" Escalera (born March 21, 1952) is a Puerto Rican former professional boxer and is the former World Boxing Council Super Featherweight world champion. A native of Carolina, his nickname was "Salsero" because he was a fan of Salsa music. Escalera and his nephew Jesus Manuel Escalera is also a 2023 Florida Boxing Hall of Fame Inductee.

== Early boxing career ==
Escalera had his first professional bout on September 4, 1970, against Bob Payzant, in Portland. He won by a knockout in round four. He would suffer his first defeat in his third fight, when faced against Doug McClendon, who beat him by a decision in six rounds on January 26, 1971, in New York. He won five bouts in a row, and then lost by decision in eight rounds to future world title challenger Edwin Viruet.

He began 1972 by losing to another future world title challenger, Diego Alcala, by knockout in round eight, but he won his three other fights that year.

In 1973, he began, once again, by losing to another future world title challenger, Miguel Montilla, by a decision in ten rounds. Before the year was over, however, he was able to avenge that defeat, defeating Montilla by a knockout in round eight, and he won seven of his eight other fights that year.

By 1974, he began climbing up the super featherweight rankings, going 8-2 that year. He beat his own future world title challenger Sigfredo Rodriguez by a knockout in round one, and former world champion Ricardo Arredondo by a disqualification in round eight.

== Champion ==
On July 4, 1975, he fought the WBC super featherweight champion Kuniaki Shibata in Mito, Japan, knocking Shibata out in round two to become the WBC super featherweight champion. Coincidentally, Escalera won his world title the same day that Angel Espada won the WBA world Welterweight championship at a fight that took place in Puerto Rico; this was the first time two Puerto Ricans became world champions the same day and as a consequence, Puerto Rico, a country that had only produced two world boxing champions in its history, doubled their number of champions in one day with Escalera and Espada's victories.

Escalera became a household name in Puerto Rico during his tenure as world champion. He appeared in television commercials and was a popular public figure.

He defended his title ten times, including wins over Ray Lunny, Sigfredo Rodriguez and Tyrone Everett. Most observers consider the Everett "win" as one of the worst decisions in boxing history, as it appeared that Everett clearly won. A rematch was being negotiated when Everett was murdered.

Escalera lost his title on January 28, 1978, to Alexis Argüello of Nicaragua by a technical knockout in round 13 in Bayamón. In this fight, Escalera suffered a broken nose and tooth, a cut on his tongue and above his left eye, and a closed right eye before submitting to Argüello. The first Arguello-Escalera encounter has been dubbed as "The Bloody Battle of Bayamon". The fight was described as "brutal".

== Post-championship career ==
Escalera and Argüello had a rematch, on February 4, 1979, in Rimini, and Escalera held a small lead on the judges' cards after 12 rounds. However, he was knocked out in round 13 by Argüello. Shortly after drawing (tying) with Antonio Cruz in ten rounds in October of that year, he announced his retirement.

In 1980, Escalera dedicated himself to the sport of professional wrestling, competing on the Puerto Rican professional wrestling circuit. However, in 1981, he launched a boxing comeback. He lost to future world light welterweight champion Gene Hatcher in San Antonio, but he beat former world title challenger Maurice Termite Watkins at "The Battle of the Champions'" undercard in Miami, to complete his 1982 boxing campaign.

In 1983, he avenged his loss to Hatcher, scoring a ten-round unanimous decision win at the Roberto Durán-Davey Moore world title fight undercard in Madison Square Garden. On September 15 of that year he lost to future world title challenger Charlie White Lighting Brown.

== Professional boxing record ==
70 fights	53 wins	14 losses
By knockout	31	4
By decision	21	10
By disqualification	1	0
Draws	3	

No.	Result	Record	Opponent	Type	Round, time	Date	Location	Notes
70	Loss	53–14–3	Charlie Brown	UD	10	1983-09-15	Madison Square Garden, New York City, New York, U.S.	
69	Win	53–13–3	Victor Babilonia	TKO	5 (10)	1983-08-12	Jai Alai Fronton, Miami, Florida, U.S.	
68	Win	52–13–3	Gene Hatcher	UD	10 (10)	1983-06-16	Madison Square Garden, New York City, New York, U.S.	
67	Win	51–13–3	Martin Rojas	UD	12 (12)	1983-05-13	Jai Alai Fronton, Miami, Florida, U.S.	Won vacant WBC Continental Americas light welterweight title
66	Win	50–13–3	Trad Thompson	KO	3 (10)	1983-03-25	Jai Alai Fronton, Miami, Florida, U.S.	
65	Loss	49–13–3	Sergio Medina	UD	10 (10)	1983-01-29	Sports Arena, Los Angeles, California, U.S.	
64	Win	49–12–3	Maurice Watkins	UD	10 (10)	1982-11-12	Miami Orange Bowl, Miami, Florida, U.S.	
63	Win	48–12–3	Guillermo Fernández	PTS	10 (10)	1982-09-18	Convention Center, Miami Beach, Florida, U.S.	
62	Win	47–12–3	Johnny Lira	MD	10 (10)	1982-07-02	Auditorium, Miami Beach, Florida, U.S.	
61	Win	46–12–3	Jesús Nava	KO	7 (10)	1982-05-21	Convention Center, Miami Beach, Florida, U.S.	
60	Loss	45–12–3	Gene Hatcher	UD	10 (10)	1982-04-09	Will Rogers Memorial Center, Fort Worth, Texas, U.S.	
59	Win	45–11–3	Clemente Munoz	PTS	10 (10)	1982-03-08	San Juan, Puerto Rico	
58	Loss	44–11–3	Angel Cruz	SD	10 (10)	1982-01-22	Felt Forum, New York City, New York, U.S.	
57	Win	44–10–3	Johnny Torres	KO	8 (10)	1981-11-21	Jai Alai Fronton, Miami, Florida, U.S.	
56	Win	43–10–3	Ruby Ortiz	PTS	10 (10)	1981-10-16	Felt Forum, New York City, New York, U.S.	
55	Draw	42–10–3	Antonio Cruz	PTS	10 (10)	1979-10-13	San Juan, Puerto Rico	
54	Loss	42–10–2	Alexis Argüello	TKO	13 (15)	1979-02-04	Sports Palace, Rimini, Italy	For WBC super featherweight title
53	Loss	42–9–2	Julio Valdez	UD	10 (10)	1978-10-27	Madison Square Garden, New York City, New York, U.S.	
52	Win	42–8–2	Larry Stanton	TKO	3 (10)	1978-07-26	Madison Square Garden, New York City, New York, U.S.	
51	Win	41–8–2	Rogelio Castañeda	UD	10 (10)	1978-06-03	Roberto Clemente Coliseum, San Juan, Puerto Rico	
50	Loss	40–8–2	Alexis Argüello	TKO	13 (15)	1978-01-28	Juan Ramón Loubriel Stadium, Bayamón, Puerto Rico	Lost WBC super featherweight title
49	Win	40–7–2	Sigfrido Rodriguez	UD	15 (15)	1977-09-10	Roberto Clemente Coliseum, San Juan, Puerto Rico	Retained WBC super featherweight title
48	Win	39–7–2	Carlos Becerril	KO	8 (15)	May 16, 1977	Capitol Center, Landover, Maryland, U.S.	Retained WBC super featherweight title
47	Win	38–7–2	Ronnie McGarvey	TKO	6 (15)	1977-03-17	Roberto Clemente Coliseum, San Juan, Puerto Rico	Retained WBC super featherweight title
46	Win	37–7–2	Tyrone Everett	SD	15 (15)	1976-11-30	Spectrum, Philadelphia, Pennsylvania, U.S.	Retained WBC super featherweight title
45	Win	36–7–2	Ray Lunny III	RTD	12 (15)	1976-09-18	Roberto Clemente Coliseum, San Juan, Puerto Rico	Retained WBC super featherweight title
44	Win	35–7–2	Buzzsaw Yamabe	UD	15 (15)	1976-07-01	City Gym, Kashihara, Japan	Retained WBC super featherweight title
43	Win	34–7–2	Buzzsaw Yamabe	TKO	6 (15)	1976-04-01	City Gym, Kashihara, Japan	Retained WBC super featherweight title
42	Win	33–7–2	José Fernandez	TKO	13 (15)	1976-02-20	Roberto Clemente Coliseum, San Juan, Puerto Rico	Retained WBC super featherweight title
41	Win	32–7–2	Sven Erik Paulsen	TKO	9 (15)	1975-12-12	Ekeberghallen, Oslo, Norway	Retained WBC super featherweight title
40	Win	31–7–2	Gaétan Hart	KO	6 (10)	1975-11-17	San Juan, Puerto Rico	
39	Draw	30–7–2	Leonel Hernandez	SD	15 (15)	1975-09-20	Poliedro, Caracas, Venezuela	Retained WBC super featherweight title
38	Win	30–7–1	Kuniaki Shibata	KO	2 (15)	1975-07-05	Kasamatsu Athletic Park Gym, Hitachinaka, Japan	Won WBC super featherweight title
37	Draw	29–7–1	Francisco Villegas	PTS	10 (10)	1975-03-31	San Juan, Puerto Rico	
36	Win	29–7	Mario Román	TKO	3 (?)	1975-02-24	Roberto Clemente Coliseum, San Juan, Puerto Rico	
35	Loss	28–7	Mario Román	TKO	2 (?)	1974-12-14	Palacio de los Deportes, Mexico City, Mexico	
34	Win	28–6	Rodriguez Valdez	KO	1 (?)	1974-11-29	Puebla, Mexico	
33	Loss	27–6	Memo Cruz	PTS	10 (10)	1974-10-28	Oaxaca, Mexico	
32	Win	27–5	Eleuterio Herrnandez	TKO	8 (10)	1974-10-18	Puebla, Mexico	
31	Win	26–5	Omar Ruben Realecio	TKO	5 (10)	1974-09-09	San Juan, Puerto Rico	
30	Win	25–5	Ricardo Arredondo	DQ	8 (10)	1974-08-03	San Juan, Puerto Rico	
29	Win	24–5	Armando Mendoza	TKO	8 (10)	1974-05-30	Roberto Clemente Coliseum, San Juan, Puerto Rico	
28	Win	23–5	Jorge Ramos	TKO	5 (10)	1974-04-01	San Juan, Puerto Rico	
27	Win	22–5	Sigfrido Rodriguez	KO	1 (10)	1974-03-03	San Juan, Puerto Rico	
26	Win	21–5	Stanley Yanachek	KO	2 (?)	1974-02-04	San Juan, Puerto Rico	
25	Win	20–5	Johnny Copeland	TKO	5 (10)	1973-12-17	Roberto Clemente Coliseum, San Juan, Puerto Rico	
24	Win	19–5	Miguel Mayan	KO	4 (?)	1973-11-30	San Juan, Puerto Rico	
23	Win	18–5	Antonio Amaya	PTS	10 (10)	1973-11-12	Roberto Clemente Coliseum, San Juan, Puerto Rico	
22	Win	17–5	José Luis López	TKO	6 (?)	1973-09-15	San Juan, Puerto Rico	
21	Win	16–5	Frankie Otero	TKO	5 (10)	1973-08-21	San Juan, Puerto Rico	
20	Win	15–5	Leo Randolph	KO	2 (?)	1973-07-21	Roberto Clemente Coliseum, San Juan, Puerto Rico	
19	Win	14–5	Miguel Montilla	TKO	8 (10)	1973-07-14	Caguas, Puerto Rico	
18	Win	13–5	Carlos Gil	KO	1 (?)	1973-05-08	San Juan, Puerto Rico	
17	Loss	12–5	Gino Febus	PTS	10 (10)	1973-04-28	Country Club Stadium, Carolina, Puerto Rico	
16	Win	12–4	Rocky Orengo	PTS	10 (10)	1973-03-31	San Juan, Puerto Rico	
15	Loss	11–4	Miguel Montilla	PTS	10 (10)	1973-03-03	San Juan, Puerto Rico	
14	Win	11–3	Miguel Morales	PTS	10 (10)	1972-09-18	San Juan, Puerto Rico	
13	Win	10–3	Carlos Penson	KO	1 (?)	1972-07-14	Ponce, Puerto Rico	
12	Win	9–3	Alejandro Falcon	KO	7 (?)	1972-06-12	San Juan, Puerto Rico	
11	Loss	8–3	Diego Alcala	KO	8 (10)	1972-02-16	Sunnyside Garden, Queens, New York, U.S.	
10	Win	8–2	Henry Ocasio	PTS	8 (8)	1971-10-26	Sunnyside Garden, Queens, New York, U.S.	
9	Loss	7–2	Edwin Viruet	PTS	8 (8)	1971-09-23	Armory, Paterson, New Jersey, U.S.	
8	Win	7–1	Reynald Cantin	PTS	10 (10)	1971-09-14	Sorel-Tracy, Quebec, Canada	
7	Win	6–1	Eddie James	MD	6 (6)	1971-09-02	Steelworkers Hall, Baltimore, Maryland, U.S.	
6	Win	5–1	Henry Ocasio	PTS	4 (4)	1971-07-26	Madison Square Garden, New York City, New York, U.S.	
5	Win	4–1	Richie Lugo	PTS	6 (6)	1971-03-30	Sunnyside Garden, Queens, New York, U.S.	
4	Win	3–1	Jimmy Jaynes	PTS	6 (6)	1971-03-24	Harvard Club, Boston, Massachusetts, U.S.	
3	Loss	2–1	Doc McClendon	PTS	6 (6)	1971-01-26	Sunnyside Garden, Queens, New York, U.S.	
2	Win	2–0	Red Walsh	UD	4 (4)	1970-12-02	Catholic Youth Center, Scranton, Pennsylvania, U.S.	
1	Win	1–0	Bob Payzant	TKO	4 (4)	1970-09-24	Exposition Building, Portland, Maine, U.S.	

== Retirement ==
After the Brown fight, Escalera announced his retirement from boxing once again. Shortly after, it was discovered that he had eyesight problems and had been fighting almost blinded for his last few fights.

Escalera now enjoys the fruits of his career in his farm in Puerto Rico. His son, Alfredo Escalera Jr., was once a boxer himself, who is based in Florida.

== Legacy ==
The avid autograph signer left a boxing record of 53 wins, 14 losses and 3 draws, with 31 wins by knockout. His two fights with Argüello are considered by many to be boxing classics, Argüello-Escalera I making The Ring magazine's list of 100 greatest fights of all time at number 67, and Argüello-Escalera II making it at number 40.

== See also ==
- Afro–Puerto Ricans
- Boxing in Puerto Rico
- List of Puerto Rican boxing world champions
- List of world super-featherweight boxing champions

Sporting positions
Regional boxing titles
Vacant Title last held by Héctor Hernández	WBC Continental Americas light welterweight champion May 13, 1983 – 1983; Vacated	Vacant Title next held by Kel Robin
World boxing titles
Preceded by Kuniaki Shibata	WBC super featherweight champion July 5, 1975 – January 28, 1978	Succeeded by Alexis Argüello
