= Bobby Rodriguez =

American boxer

Personal information
- Nationality: American
- Born: Roberto Rodriguez Deer River, Minnesota, U.S.
- Height: 5 ft 6 in (168 cm)
- Weight: Super Featherweight

Boxing career

Boxing record
- Total fights: 36
- Wins: 24
- Win by KO: 11
- Losses: 11
- Draws: 2

Bobby Rodriguez is an American retired Super Featherweight boxer from Minneapolis, Minnesota.

== Personal life ==
Bobby Rodriguez is a member of Minnesota's Rodriguez family of boxers: Rafael, Kenny, Rudy, all of whom fought professionals; brother John, who fought only as an amateur, and Cory, son of John, who is an active professional boxer at this writing. Bobby now spends his retirement training young golden glove boxers in the Leech Lake area.

== Professional career ==
Rodriguez made his professional debut on May 10, 1967, with a 4-round points defeat of Archie Bailey in Saint Paul. Rodriguez won his first 20 professional fights, losing for the first time by TKO on January 16 of 1969, when he was stopped due to cuts in the sixth round of a fight with Pete Gonzalez at Olympic Auditorium in Los Angeles. Rodriguez's record after that loss was a mediocre 4-10, and included several extended periods of inactivity. His career concluded following back-to-back losses to Rick Folstad, the first of which was for Minnesota's State Junior Welterweight title.

At his retirement Rodriguez had compiled a professional record of 24-10-2 with 11 knockouts. In the course of compiling this record Rodriguez battled such talented boxers as Ricky Sawa, Baby Luis, José Moreno, Beto Maldonado, Maurice Watkins, and the aforementioned Rick Folstad.
