= Brian Brunette =

American boxer

Brian Brunette is an American former professional boxer who competed from 1980 to 1986, challenging for the WBA light welterweight title in 1986.

== Professional career ==
Brunette made his professional debut on July 7, 1980, with a 2nd-round knockout of Wayne Grant on the undercard of the Larry Holmes-Scott LeDoux match at Met Center in Bloomington, Minnesota. Brunette won his first 23 fights, 17 of them by knockout.

On September 6, 1986, Brunette squared off against undefeated champion Patrizio Oliva in Campania, Italy for Oliva's WBA light welterweight title. Brunette lost via third-round technical knockout (TKO) in a scheduled fifteen round bout, when his manager threw in a towel to stop the bout.

Brian was managed and trained by his brothers and father.

Three months later Brunette returned to the ring for one last fight, defeating middleweight Billy Travers by 5th-round TKO. It was his final professional fight, as he retired at the age of 28 after sustaining an eye injury while preparing for a match in Johannesburg, South Africa, in 1987. His record at the time of retirement was 24-1, with 18 wins coming by knockout.

He was managed by his brother Tommy and trained by his brother, Bob.

== Professional boxing record ==
24 Wins (18 knockouts, 6 decisions), 1 Loss (1 knockout, 0 decisions)
Result	Record	Opponent	Type	Round	Date	Location	Notes
Win	--	Billy Travers	TKO	5	26/12/1986	(United States) Key West High School, Key West, Florida, U.S.	Referee stopped the bout at 0:28 of the fifth round.
Loss	46-0	(Italy) Patrizio Oliva	TKO	3	06/09/1986	Naples, Italy	WBA Light Welterweight Title. Bout stopped at 2:38 of the third round after Brunette's trainer threw in the towel.
Win	32-12-2	(Dominican Republic) Ezequiel Sanchez	KO	7	13/05/1986	(United States) Bloomington, Minnesota, U.S.	
Win	--	(United States) Lalo Gimenez	KO	3	31/01/1986	(United States) Fort Lauderdale, Florida, U.S.	Lalo knocked out at 1:22 of the third round.
Win	0-2	(United States) Jim Freeman	TKO	3	26/12/1985	(United States) Turnberry Isle Resort and Club, Miami Beach, Florida, U.S.	Referee stopped the bout at 2:10 of the third round.
Win	9-8	(United States) Steve Mitchell	UD	10	10/09/1985	(United States) Saint Paul, Minnesota, U.S.	
Win	15-2	(United States) Ken Larson	TKO	2	29/05/1985	(United States) Holiday Star Theater, Merrillville, Indiana, U.S.	
Win	13-2-1	(United States) Rudy Fuentes	KO	2	22/11/1984	(United States) Saint Paul, Minnesota, U.S.	Fuentes knocked out at 1:10 of the second round.
Win	13-9-3	(United States) Trevor Evelyn	PTS	10	08/08/1984	(United States) Saint Paul, Minnesota, U.S.	
Win	0-3	(United States) Greg Collins	KO	1	13/05/1984	(United States) Highland, Indiana, U.S.	
Win	22-4	(United States) Gary Holmgren	MD	10	01/02/1984	(United States) Saint Paul, Minnesota, U.S.	Minnesota Light Middleweight Title
Win	63-43-4	(United States) Bruce Strauss	TKO	6	08/12/1983	(United States) Saint Paul, Minnesota, U.S.	
Win	10-12-1	(United States) Larry Mayes	TKO	2	26/10/1983	(United States) Saint Paul, Minnesota, U.S.	
Win	0-9	(United States) Billy Doyle	KO	2	26/08/1983	(United States) Belcourt, North Dakota, U.S.	
Win	9-4-2	(United States) Mike Pollitt	TKO	4	23/07/1983	(United States) Saint Paul, Minnesota, U.S.	
Win	--	Steve Roake	KO	2	07/05/1983	(United States) Fargo, North Dakota, U.S.	
Win	4-16	(United States) Tony Akbar Taylor	TKO	5	12/11/1981	(United States) Saint Paul, Minnesota, U.S.	
Win	2-7-2	(United States) Larry Ward	PTS	8	06/05/1981	(United States) Saint Paul, Minnesota, U.S.	
Win	0-5-1	(United States) Nate Lenoir	KO	2	26/02/1981	(United States) Saint Paul, Minnesota, U.S.	
Win	8-18-2	(United States) Charlie Peterson	PTS	6	21/01/1981	(United States) Saint Paul, Minnesota, U.S.	
Win	1-18	(United States) Dale Gordon	PTS	4	09/12/1980	(United States) Warren, Ohio, U.S.	
Win	0-1	(United States) Darrell Ned Miller	TKO	2	11/11/1980	(United States) Saint Paul, Minnesota, U.S.	Referee stopped the bout at 2:06 of the second round.
Win	1-1	(United States) Donnie Williams	KO	1	23/09/1980	(United States) Indianapolis, Indiana, U.S.	
Win	--	(United States) Rocky Trampler	KO	2	24/07/1980	Winnipeg, Manitoba, Canada	
Win	0-1	(United States) Wayne Grant	KO	2	07/07/1980	(United States) Bloomington, Minnesota, U.S.	

== Personal life ==
Brian Brunette is married with two daughters and lives in Mendota Heights, Minnesota. Since retiring from boxing, Brunetta has worked as a manager for his family's boxing gym. He has also received his pilot's license.
