= Rafael Rodriguez (boxer) =

American boxer

Rafael Rodriguez is a retired light middleweight professional boxer from Minneapolis, Minnesota.

== Personal life ==
Rafael Rodriguez is a member of Minnesota's illustrious Rodriguez family of boxers: Bobby, Kenny, Rudy, all of whom fought as professionals; brother John, who fought only as an amateur, and Corey, son of John, who is an active professional boxer. Rafael is divorced from Barbara Seeker, they have 3 children. Elizabeth- 5 grandchildren (Kallie, Cameron, Taylor, Ricky, and Riley), Shannon- 4 grandchildren (Kara, Shon, Justin, and Joshua) Rafael II- (Rafael III) and 1 great-grandson Payton.

== Professional career ==
Rodriguez made his professional debut with a five-round points win against Casey Puskar on December 3, 1970. He remained undefeated through four professional fights, losing for the first time to 0-9 Billy Goodwin in a fourth-round knockout on March 8, 1972. Following this unexpected loss Rodriguez remained unbeaten for another three years, winning ten fights and earning one draw. By March 1975 Rodriguez was sporting a record of 14-1-1. His career after this point is difficult to characterize; he remained competitive, mixing wins and losses to the end of his career, but compiling a distinctly mediocre record of 14-20-1 before retiring in 1983 following a loss to Gary Holmgren in a fight for the Minnesota junior middleweight title. After starting his career in such compelling fashion, Rodriguez finally retired with a record of 28-20-2 with 10 wins coming by knockout. However, it must be remembered that many of Rodriguez's later fights were against notably successful boxers, some of whom he surprised by beating them.

In 2010 it was announced that Rodriguez would be a member of the inaugural class of inductees to the Minnesota Boxing Hall of Fame.
