= Boxing in Japan =

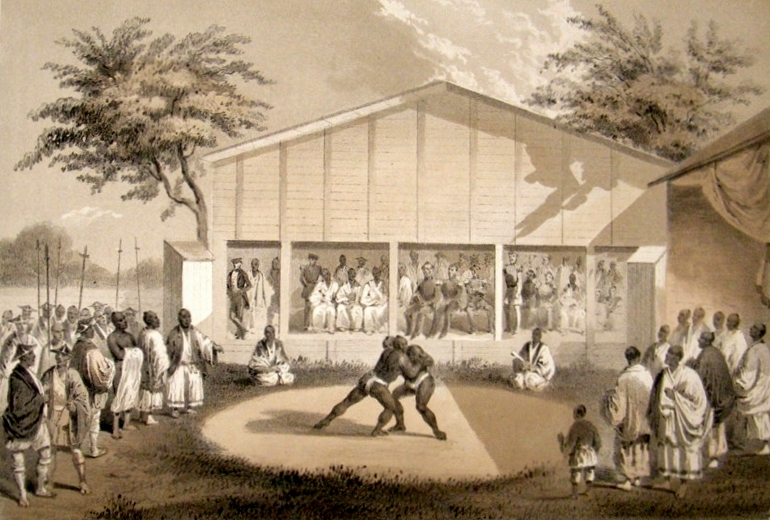
The lithograph published by D. Appleton & Company for Narrative of the Expedition of an American Squadron to the China Seas and Japan: Performed in the Years 1852, 1853, and 1854 by Francis L. Hawks

The history of boxing in Japan began in 1854 when Matthew Perry landed at Shimoda, Shizuoka soon after the Convention of Kanagawa. At that time, American sailors often engaged in sparring matches on board their ships, with their fists wrapped in thin leather. It was the first example of boxing conveyed to Japan. In addition, an ōzeki-ranked sumo wrestler named Koyanagi was summoned by the shogunate, and ordered to fight a boxer and a wrestler from the United States. There were three fought matches, using different martial arts styles, before Perry and other spectators. Koyanagi reportedly won.

Yūjirō Watanabe, known as the Father of Japanese Boxing (born 1889 or 1890)

== History ==
The first exhibition match named Western Professional Sumo (西洋大相撲) was held in Tsukiji, Tokyo in 1887. The first boxing gym Meriken Training Institute (メリケン練習所) was established in Ishikawachō, Yokohama, Kanagawa by James Hōjō (ジェームス 北條) and Toranosuke Saitō (齋藤 虎之助) in 1896. After the first tutorial book, Bōgeki Jizai Seiyō Kentōjutsu (防撃自在西洋拳闘術) was issued in 1900, followed shortly by International Jūken Club (国際柔拳倶楽部) was opened in Mikage, Kobe by Kenji Kanō in 1909.

Sadayuki Ogino, the Father of Japanese Boxing (1901–1970)

After learning boxing in San Francisco, California, since 1906, Yujiro Watanabe (渡辺勇次郎, Yūjirō Watanabe; aka Father of Japanese Boxing or Four-Round King) established Nippon Kentō Club (日本拳闘倶楽部) in Shimomeguro, Meguro, Tokyo, on December 25, 1921. Sadayuki Ogino (荻野貞行; also known as father of Japanese Boxing) from Rikkyo University began boxing under Watanabe's management. Ogino in the junior featherweight and Kinzaburō Yokoyama (横山 金三郎) in the featherweight were recognized as the first Japanese champions by Nippon Kentō Club in 1922.

Japan's first Olympic boxers

Fuji Okamoto (1905–1984)

Kintarō Usuda (1906–1980)

In the first Japanese title matches for professional boxers held in April 1924, Fuji Okamoto in the flyweight division and Kintarō Usuda in the lightweight division became titleholders. There was no clear distinction between amateur and professional around that time.

=== Inauguration of Federation ===
Simultaneously with National Student Kentō Federation (全国学生拳闘連盟) whose president was Yūjirō Watanabe, the All-Japan Amateur Federation (全日本アマチュア連盟) was established in July 1926. The first Japanese championships for amateur boxers was held by Kenji Kanō's Dai Nippon Kentōkai (大日本拳闘会) in 1927. Fuji Okamoto in the bantamweight division and Kintarō Usuda in the welterweight division participated in the 1928 Summer Olympics.

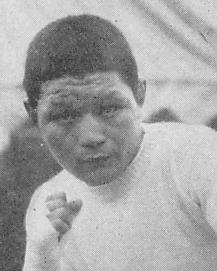
Tsuneo "Piston" Horiguchi (1914–1950)

All-Japan Professional Kentō Association (全日本プロフェッショナル拳闘協会) was founded in February 1931 in order to perform the establishment of championships and the development of professional boxers, repeated division and dissolution to become the current Japan Pro Boxing Association (JPBA). Tsuneo Horiguchi (堀口 恒男; aka Piston Horiguchi, Saint Fist; 拳聖) from Waseda University gained popularity and played an active part in those days. Although Japan's boxing was interrupted by the Pacific War, the first Japanese championships after the war was held in 1947.

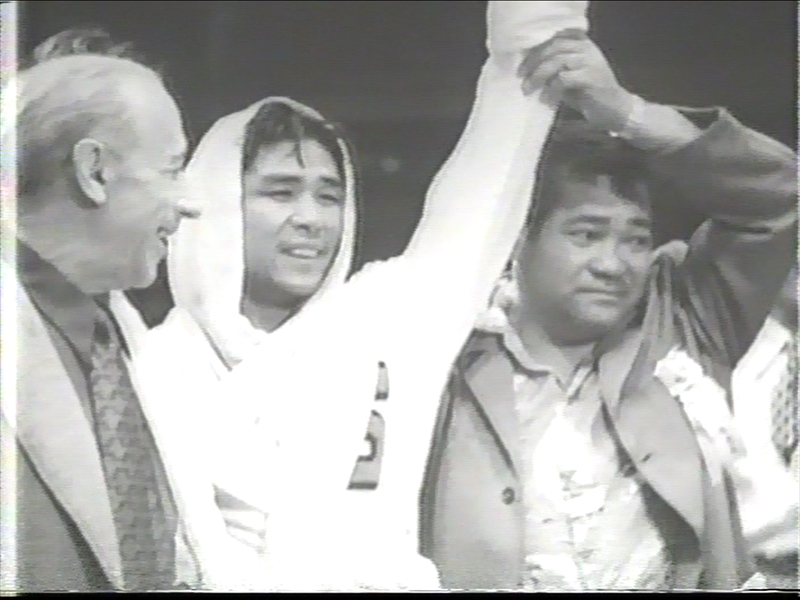
Yoshio Shirai, on the day he was crowned Japan's first world champion, 1952

=== World title match ===
Then the Japan Boxing Commission (JBC), virtually the only governing body of Japan's professional boxing, was founded in order to prepare Yoshio Shirai's world title match. Its establishment was presented at the Tokyo Kaikan on April 21, 1952. Munehide Tanabe (田邊 宗英; often written as 田辺 宗英) from Waseda University who was the founding president of Teiken Boxing Gym and the president of the Korakuen Stadium, was elected as its first commissioner.

Shirai defeated lineal champion Dado Marino via a unanimous decision in the flyweight division on May 19 of that year, while being watched by 45,000 spectators at the Korakuen Stadium, to become the Japan's first world champion.

==== WBA and WBC ====
The JBC joined the NBA (the current WBA) on January 7, 1954. They also joined the WBC since the rematch of Johnny Famechon vs. Fighting Harada on May 9, 1970. (Note: The WBC championships in Japan have always been sanctioned under the WBC's open scoring system since the world title doubleheader featuring Hozumi Hasegawa and Eagle Kyowa in November 13, 2006.)

=== Boxing Magazine ===
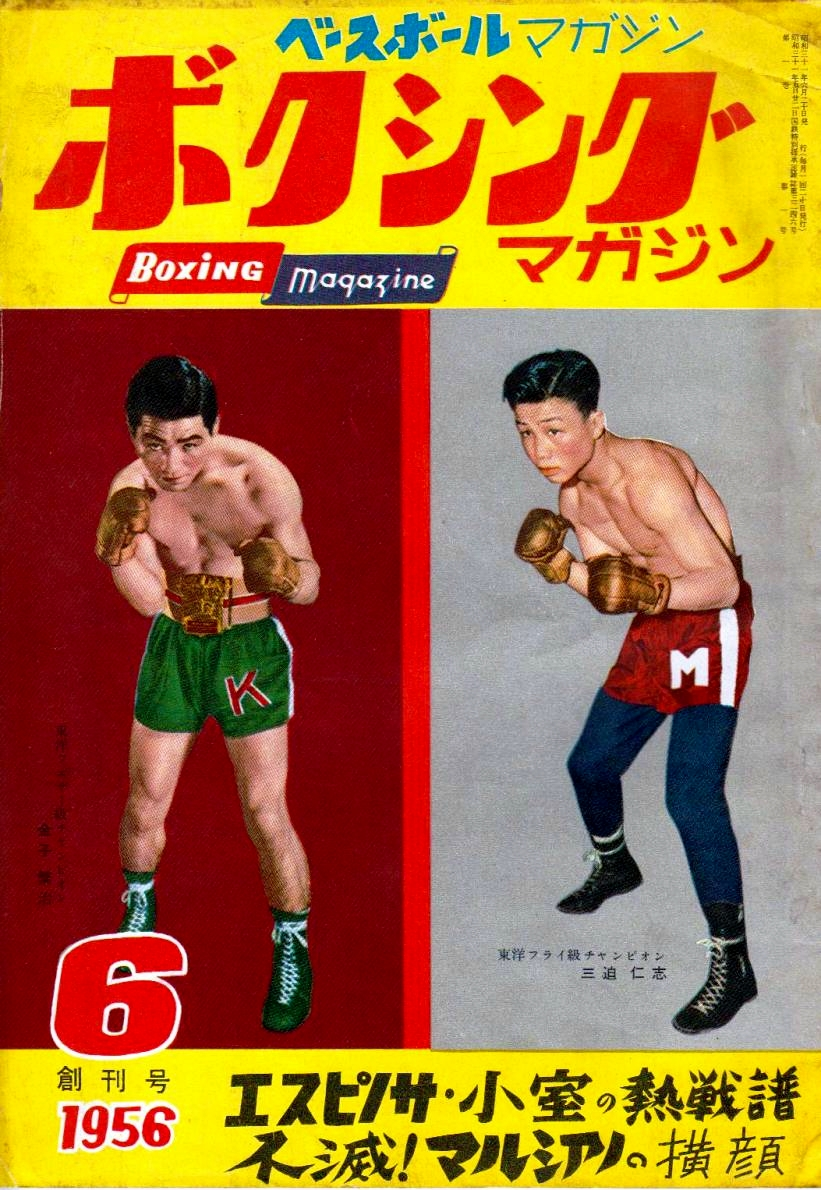
Cover of the first issue of Boxing Magazine, 1956

In June 1956, Boxing Magazine, the Japan's oldest surviving boxing journal, was launched by the Baseball Magazine Company. Currently there is only one other monthly boxing journal in Japan, called Boxing Beat. This has been renamed twice from World Boxing since 1968.

=== Pro-Am joint training ===
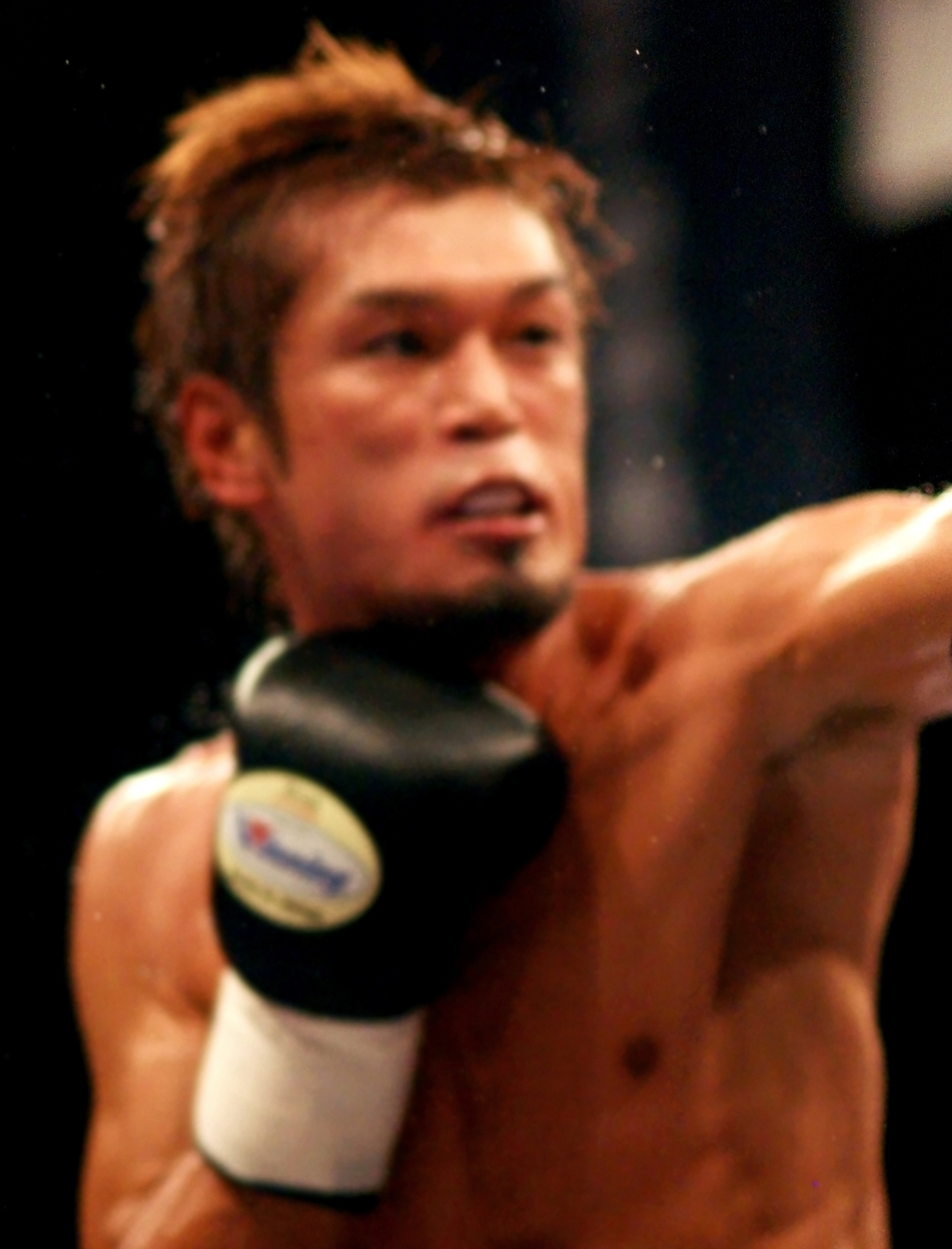
Nobuhiro Ishida, 2010

Traditionally, the different bodies of amateur and professional boxers had had no exchanges. However, they decided in 2011 to cooperate with each other, beginning with joint training.

From 2011 through 2012, the middleweight boxers had record-breaking performances both in amateur and professional boxing. Nobuhiro Ishida knocked out the previously undefeated James Kirkland at the MGM Grand Las Vegas to be awarded The Ring Upset of the Year. Ryōta Murata secured the silver medal in the World Amateur Boxing Championships in Baku, Azerbaijan to qualify for the 2012 Summer Olympics. Tadashi Yuba won his fifth Japanese title in four different weight divisions to be a quadruple champion. All those are the first records for Japan. In August 2013, Yuba picked up the Japanese super welterweight title to be a quintuple champion.

=== Television ===
Most of the world championship fights have been televised mainly on Nittere (NTV), TBS, Fuji TV, and TV Tokyo. Currently, these programs can be legally watched outside Japan via KeyHoleTV. In addition, pay-TV channels such as WOWOW and sky-A sports+ have provided boxing programs. Although Fuji TV had been withdrawn from boxing except for the late-night show since Yūji Watanabe lost to Genaro Hernández in 1992, they resumed a live boxing program in prime time from April 2013.

== Amateur boxing ==
=== Summer Olympics ===
The Summer Olympics medalists are:

| Name | Game | Medal | Weight Class |
|---|---|---|---|
| Kiyoshi Tanabe | 1960 Rome | Bronze | Flyweight |
| Takao Sakurai | 1964 Tokyo | Gold | Bantamweight |
| Eiji Morioka | 1968 Mexico | Bronze | Bantamweight |
| Satoshi Shimizu | 2012 London | Bronze | Bantamweight |
| Ryōta Murata | 2012 London | Gold | Middleweight |
| Ryomei Tanaka | 2020 Tokyo | Bronze | Flyweight |
| Tsukimi Namiki | 2020 Tokyo | Bronze | Flyweight |
| Sena Irie | 2020 Tokyo | Gold | Featherweight |

=== World Championships ===
The World Championships medalists are:

| Name | Game | Medal | Weight Class |
|---|---|---|---|
| Koki Ishii (boxer) | 1978 Belgrade | Bronze | Flyweight |
| Masatsugu Kawachi | 2007 Chicago | Bronze | Light welterweight |
| Ryōta Murata | 2011 Baku | Silver | Middleweight |

== Professional boxing ==
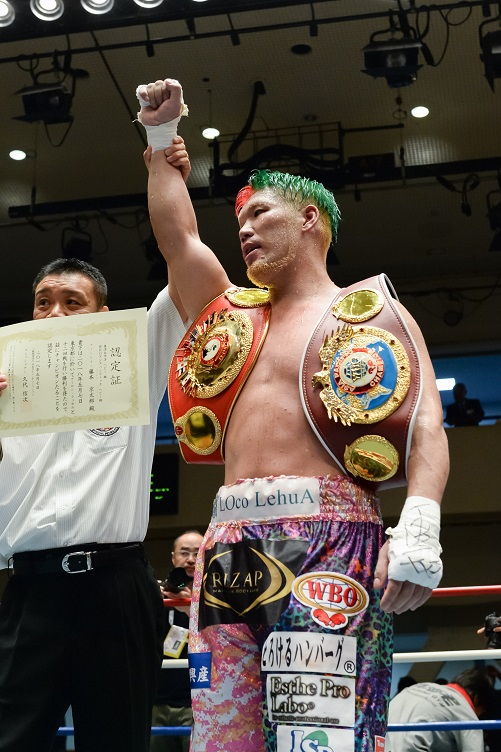
Heavyweight boxer Kyotaro Fujimoto. Retained OPBF and WBO Asia Pacific heavyweight titles in May 2018.

In Japan, every professional boxer must contract with a manager under the JBC rules, and is required to belong to a boxing gym which has exclusive management rights for boxers as a member of each regional subsidiary body of Japan Pro Boxing Association under the Japan's conventional gym system. Two professional boxers belonging to the same gym have not been allowed to fight against each other unless one of them transfers to other gym, because it might disrupt the gym system. However, it is often quite difficult for boxers to transfer between the gyms due to the matters on transfer fees, match fees and so on.

The JBC set up the Japanese heavyweight title once in 1957, but that division did not last long because there were few heavyweight boxers in Japan at that time. Therefore, they have recognized the titles and ratings only in thirteen weight divisions from minimumweight to middleweight for over fifty years. They added four weight divisions i.e. super middleweight, light heavyweight, cruiserweight and heavyweight, from September 2009. Kyōtarō Fujimoto was crowned the heavyweight champion in July 2013.

=== Tournaments ===
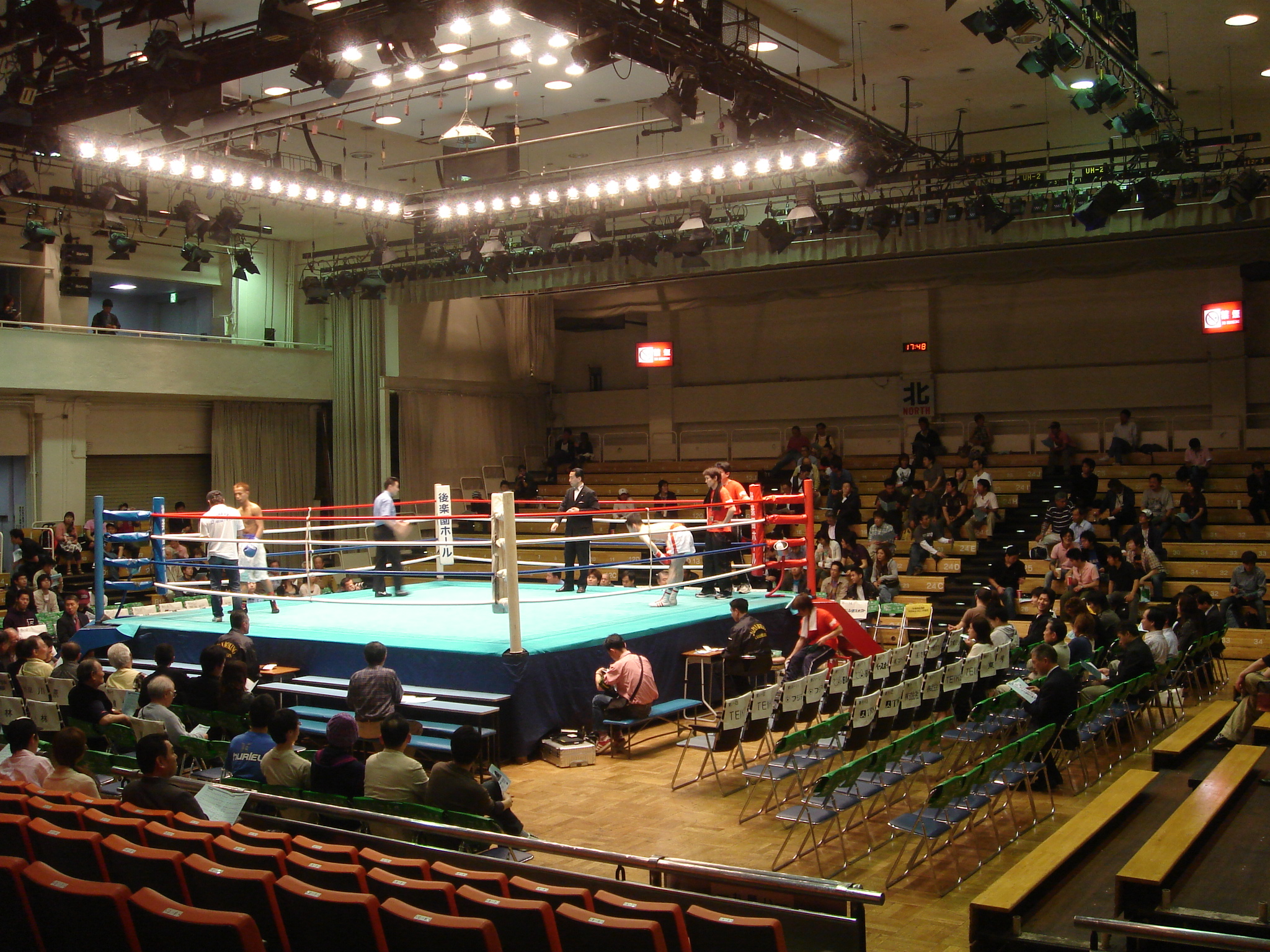
A scene from a preliminary match of the 2006 East Japan Rookie King Tournament at the Korakuen Hall in Tokyo

Currently, Japan has two major annual tournaments. One is the All-Japan Rookie King (全日本新人王, Zen-Nihon shinjin'ō) Tournament which came to be known by the popular anime/manga series Hajime no Ippo, (Note: In the All-Japan Rookie King Tournament, a boxer who unified rookie king titles of the West Japan (西日本, Nishinihon), Central Japan (中日本, Nakanihon) and Western part of Japan (西部日本, Seibu-Nihon) is promoted to the West representative (西軍代表, Seigun daihyō) and confronts the East Japan rookie king who is also the East representative (東軍代表, Tōgun daihyō) at the same time in order to decide the winner of the tournament. The West Japan rookie king can not fight against the East Japan rookie king unless he unifies all those three titles. To be exact, what is depicted as the West Japan rookie king in Hajime no Ippo ought to be the West representative.) and the other is the Japanese Title Elimination Tournament nicknamed The Strongest in Korakuen (最強後楽園, Saikyō Kōrakuen; former Class A Tournament), which is competed by "class A boxers" who have acquired a "class A license" to fight in eight or more round bouts, and whose winners would be recognized as the next mandatory challengers against each divisional Japanese champion in the annual mandatory bout series Champion Carnival. In addition to those, there are several other tournaments, such as Raging Battle (renamed from B:Tight!).

=== Boxing today ===
As of Feb 2022, Japan produced 85 male world champions and 23 female world champions. When Yōta Satō won the world title to be the twelfth world champion managed by Kyoei Boxing Gym in March 2012, Japan had had nine world champions at the same time including an "emeritus champion" and a "champion in recess". Although nine boxers except non-Japanese nationals and females were crowned world champions across the sea, it is in contrast to the status of boxing in the Philippines where 31 of 40 world champions won the title abroad as of April 2016. Katsunari Takayama fighting out of the ALA Boxing Gym of Cebu City has won the IBF title in 2013, after resigning his JBC license in 2009 in order to compete for the IBF or the WBO title outside Japan.

Japanese nationals who won world titles outside of the country (male)
| Year | Champion | Weight Class | Location | Result |
|---|---|---|---|---|
| 1968 | Shōzo Saijō | Featherweight | Los Angeles, California, United States | Won by UD |
| 1970 | Kuniaki Shibata | Featherweight | Tijuana, Baja California, Mexico | Won by RTD |
| 1973 | Kuniaki Shibata (Second tenure) | Junior lightweight | Honolulu, Hawaii, United States | Won by UD |
| 1980 | Shōji Oguma (Second tenure) | Flyweight | Seoul, South Korea | Won by KO |
| 1980 | Yasutsune Uehara | Junior lightweight (No link) | Detroit, Michigan, United States | Won by KO |
| 1981 | Tadashi Mihara | Junior middleweight | Rochester, New York, United States | Won by MD |
| 1992 | Akinobu Hiranaka | Junior welterweight | Mexico City, Federal District, Mexico | Won by TKO |
| 2013 | Katsunari Takayama (Third tenure) | Mini flyweight | Guasave, Sinaloa, Mexico | Won by UD |
| 2013 | Kōki Etō (Interim) | Flyweight | Bangkok, Thailand | Won by UD |
| 2013 | Tomoki Kameda | Bantamweight | Cebu City, Philippines | Won by UD |

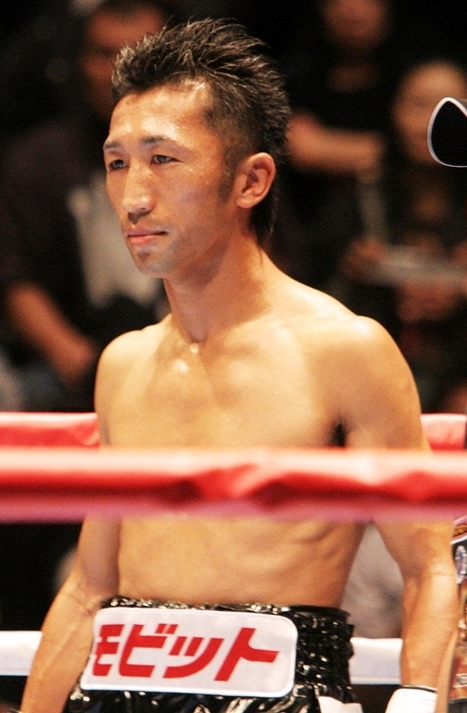
Daisuke Naitō in 2009

Japan's male world champions rarely risk their titles outside of their country. Apart from non-Japanese nationals, the thirteen champions did it, and the only four among them successfully defended their titles. That is because Japan's professional boxing has given priority to holding the fights in their own country to get paid television broadcast rights fees. Consequently, Japan's champions still remain internationally unrecognized. The broadcast rights fees have decreased under the economic downturn.

Japanese nationals' world title defenses outside of the country (male)
| Year | Champion | Weight Class | Location | Result |
|---|---|---|---|---|
| 1963 | Fighting Harada | Flyweight | Bangkok, Thailand | Lost by MD |
| 1964 | Hiroyuki Ebihara | Flyweight | Bangkok, Thailand | Lost by SD |
| 1973 | Kuniaki Shibata | Junior lightweight | Honolulu, Hawaii, United States | Lost by KO |
| 1976 | Guts Ishimatsu | Lightweight | Bayamón, Puerto Rico | Lost by UD |
| 1976 | Royal Kobayashi | Junior featherweight | Seoul, South Korea | Lost by MD |
| 1985 | Jirō Watanabe | Junior bantamweight | Daegu, South Korea | Retained by TKO |
| 2009 | Toshiaki Nishioka | Super bantamweight | Monterrey, Nuevo León, Mexico | Retained by TKO |
| 2010 | Nobuhiro Ishida (Interim) | Super welterweight | Tepic, Nayarit, Mexico | Lost by SD |
| 2011 | Akifumi Shimoda | Super bantamweight | Atlantic City, New Jersey, United States | Lost by KO |
| 2011 | Toshiaki Nishioka (Second time) | Super bantamweight | Las Vegas, Nevada, United States | Retained by UD |
| 2013 | Yōta Satō | Super flyweight | Sisaket, Thailand | Lost by TKO |
| 2013 | Takashi Miura | Super featherweight | Cancun, Mexico | Retained by UD |
| 2013 | Kōki Kameda | Bantamweight | Jeju Province, South Korea | Retained by SD |
| 2013 | Kōki Etō (Interim) | Flyweight | Chonburi, Thailand | Lost by TKO |

=== Recognition Issues ===
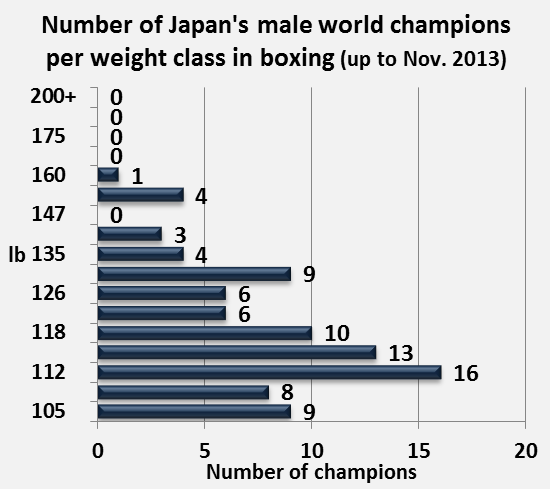
The number of Japan's male world champions per weight class up to November 2013. Champions in multiple weight classes are counted in each category. Satoshi Shingaki who became the IBF champion before April 1, 2013, and Kōki Etō who won the interim title since February 28, 2011, are not officially recognized as Japan's champions, but are included here.

Japanese boxers have very low recognition in the United States, as cable networks are generally unconcerned with the lower weight classes to which most of the Japanese boxers belong. In April 2012, The Ring's Doug Fischer outlined the following three basic conditions that are required for Japan's boxing in order to earn international recognition:

#The Japanese commission needs to recognize the WBO and the IBF.

1. Japan's top promoters need to bring in more world-class fighters from outside of Asia to challenge their fighters.
2. The Japanese titleholders need to fight each other.

— Doug Fischer, Dougie's Friday mailbag, RingTV.com

The fight between the WBC's Kazuto Ioka and the WBA's Akira Yaegashi in June 2012 was the first-ever world title unification match for Japan's world champions. The president of Japan Pro Boxing Association Hideyuki Ohashi mentioned that it could be a healthy sign for the future of Japan's boxing. Prior to that, there have been two attempts to unify the world titles. However, in the fight between the WBA's Jirō Watanabe and the WBC's Payao Poontarat, Watanabe was stripped of his WBA title before the fight since he participated in that bout under the WBC rules without being sanctioned by the WBA. The chairman of the WBA's championship committee Elias Cordova had warned on the day of the fight stating that "The minute he steps into the ring Watanabe will be stripped of his title." In the fight between the WBC's Hozumi Hasegawa and the WBO's Fernando Montiel, Montiel's WBO title was not at stake because the JBC had recognized only the WBA, WBC and its co-founder OPBF as legitimate governing organizations sanctioning championship bouts and had not allowed their boxers to fight for the other organizations' titles.

==== WBO and IBF ====
On February 28, 2011, the JBC permitted them only when a Japan's reigning world titleholder of the WBA and/or WBC was going to fight in a title unification match against a world champion of the WBO and/or IBF. However, at that time, even if a Japan's champion won, he had to vacate the newer WBO and/or IBF title after a fixed period, and a defense match for the newer title was not authorized.

The JBC announced that they would join the WBO and the IBF on April 1, 2013. Although they still do not recognize the international title and regional titles, the JBC decided to allow their boxers to fight for any world titles of the four major sanctioning bodies.

== Boxing fatalities ==
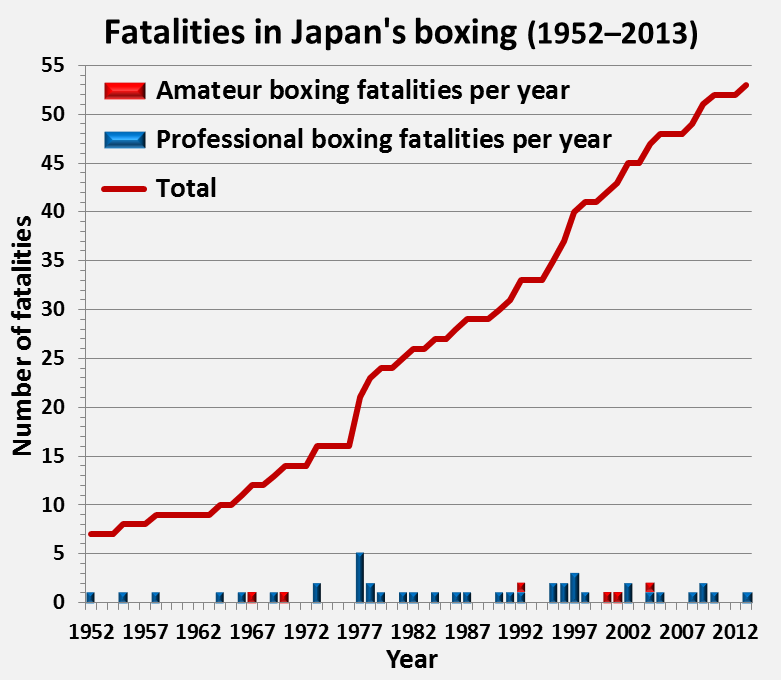
The number of fatalities in Japan's boxing, 1952–2013. The numbers include six deaths before 1952. Boxers who died after being in a coma for more than one year after the fatal fight are counted in the year the fight happened.

From 1950 through 2011, Tokyo was the city with the most boxing fatalities in the world. After the JBC's inception in April 1952, thirty-eight Japanese professional boxers died from fight injuries. In 1973, one boxer among them died after an eighth-round knockout loss in a super featherweight ten-round bout in Agana, Guam. He is the only Japanese boxer to die outside of his home country.

There were six fatal accidents before that. First, an African American died of athlete's heart after an exhibition match in Yokohama in 1902. The first Japanese fatality was the former national lightweight champion, Nobuo Kobayashi. He never regained consciousness after a ninth-round technical knockout loss at the Koshien tennis court in Nishinomiya, Hyōgo in 1930.

After the year 1952, five Japanese amateur boxers and two Thai professional boxers died due to a fight in Japan. In addition, one Japanese amateur boxer died of cerebral hemorrhage after the test for a professional boxer's license, and one Japanese professional boxer suffered a fatal cerebral hemorrhage during a sparring session. The thirty-eighth victim under the JBC's professional regulations and rules, and the fifty-third in total, died of subdural hematoma seventeen days after his first professional bout against another debutant.

== See also ==
- List of Japanese boxing world champions
- Ashita no Joe, Rokudenashi Blues and Hajime no Ippo, popular manga titles about the sport
- Japan Boxing Federation

== Bibliography ==
- Boxing Magazine editorial department, ed. (May 31, 2002). 日本プロボクシング史 世界タイトルマッチで見る50年 (Japan Pro Boxing History – 50 Years of World Title Bouts) (in Japanese). Tokyo, Japan: Baseball Magazine Sha Co., Ltd. pp. 40–41, 78, 286, 291. ISBN 978-4-583-03695-3.
- Boxing Magazine editorial department, ed. (March 1, 2004). 日本プロボクシングチャンピオン大鑑 (in Japanese). Tokyo, Japan: Baseball Magazine Sha Co., Ltd. pp. 66, 67, 172, 242, 289. ISBN 978-4-583-03784-4.
- Jake Donovan (April 2012). "Upset of the Year". The Ring. No. May 2012 issue. Pennsylvania, United States: Sports and Entertainment Publications, LLC. pp. 44–45.
- Boxing Beat editorial department (October 15, 2011). MACC Publications Inc (ed.). 村田が銀 & 五輪切符獲得. Ironman. Boxing Beat (in Japanese) (special issue). Tokyo, Japan: Fitness Sports Co., Ltd.: 109.
- Boxing Beat editorial department (February 15, 2012). MACC Publications Inc (ed.). 湯場、ついに4階級制覇成す. Ironman. Boxing Beat (in Japanese) (special issue). Tokyo, Japan: Fitness Sports Co., Ltd.: 29.
- Asazawa, Ei; Shibuya, Jun (September 10, 2007). 移籍騒動の高山、問題収束せぬまま10月に再起. Boxing Magazine (in Japanese). No. October 2007 issue. Tokyo, Japan: Baseball Magazine Sha Co., Ltd. p. 61.
- Shigeru Masuda (September 10, 2007). 熱いぞ! とてつもなく熱いぞ!! フィリピン・リングの「今」と「昔」. Boxing Magazine (in Japanese). No. October 2007 issue. Tokyo, Japan: Baseball Magazine Sha Co., Ltd. p. 55.
- Boxing Magazine editorial department (with Japan Boxing Commission, Japan Pro Boxing Association), ed. (April 30, 2005). "ボクシング百科全書 – リング禍". 日本ボクシング年鑑2005 (Japan Boxing Year Book 2005) (in Japanese). Tokyo, Japan: Baseball Magazine Sha Co., Ltd. p. 188. ISBN 978-4-583-03849-0.
