= Pete Podgorski =

American boxer

Personal information
- Born: December 1953 (age 72)

Boxing career

Boxing record
- Total fights: 38
- Wins: 22
- Win by KO: 16
- Losses: 14
- No contests: 1

Pete Podgorski (born December 1953) is a former amateur and professional - Junior Welterweight, Welterweight & light middleweight boxer, as well as a boxing official.

As an amateur, Podgorski compiled a 45-12 record, along with twenty knockouts. The 1972 C.Y.O. Catholic Youth Organization Welterweight Champion, 1973 Fox Valley, Wisconsin Golden Gloves Champion, and 1977 C.P.D. Chicago Park District Open division 156 lb. Champion also fought as a member of the United States national boxing teams. Occasionally nicknamed the "Polish Hammer" and "The Percentage Man", he is of Polish, Russian, Irish and French descent. Mothers last name was, La Montagne. As a professional boxer, Podgorski compiled a 22-14 record with sixteen knockouts

== Professional boxing record ==
22 Wins (16 knockouts, 6 decisions), 14 Losses (8 knockouts, 6 decisions), 1 No Contest
Result	Record	Opponent	Type	Round	Date	Location	Notes
Win	0-1-1	(Greece) George Nick Mavrou	KO	2	02/12/1986	Highland, Indiana, United States	
Loss	12-0-2	(Italy) Romolo Casamonica	TKO	3	25/09/1986	Paris, France	
Win	1-4	(Republic of Ireland) Tom Lally	KO	3	01/08/1986	LaPorte, Indiana, United States	Lally knocked out at 2:49 of the third round.
Win	0-0-1	(Poland) John Malars	TKO	1	22/07/1986	Highland, Indiana, United States	
Loss	6-1	(United States) Ernie Houser	TKO	2	17/06/1986	Sterling Heights, Michigan, United States	
Loss	3-2-2	(United States) Chris Bajor	UD	6	20/08/1985	Tropicana Hotel & Casino, Atlantic City, New Jersey, United States	
Win	2-2-1	(Republic of Ireland) Brandon Quarry	KO	5	12/07/1985	Cudahy, Wisconsin, United States	Mid West/Mid American Light Middleweight Titles.
Loss	26-13	(United States) Randy Mitchem	UD	8	23/04/1985	Tropicana Hotel & Casino, Atlantic City, New Jersey, United States	
Win	1-0	(Germany) Rich Herman	TKO	3	16/04/1985	Highland, Indiana, United States	
Win	1-1	(Republic of Ireland) Brandon Quarry	KO	2	20/03/1985	Cudahy, Wisconsin, United States	Quarry knocked out at 2:30 of the second round.
Win	1-0	(United States) Mike Szymanski	TKO	3	11/03/1985	Century Center, South Bend, Indiana, United States	
Loss	11-0	(United States) Jack Callahan	MD	6	22/02/1985	Hammond Civic Center, Hammond, Indiana, United States	
Loss	21-0-1	(United States) Danny Ferris	TKO	7	20/12/1984	(New York (state)) Saratoga Springs, New York, United States	Referee stopped the bout at 1:57 of the seventh round.
Win	0-2	(United States) Gary Granite	KO	2	20/11/1984	Highland, Indiana, United States	Granite knocked out at 1:15 of the second round.
Win	0-3-1	(United States) Jerry Tucker	UD	4	18/09/1984	Highland, Indiana, United States	40-36, 39-37, 40-36.
Loss	65-45-6	(United States) Bruce Strauss	SD	8	10/07/1984	Highland, Indiana, United States	
Win	0-1	(Italy) John Schirico	KO	1	13/03/1984	Highland, Indiana, United States	Schirico knocked out at 2:59 of the first round.
Loss	14-3	(United States) Arnie Wells	TKO	2	23/11/1983	Russellville, Michigan, United States	
Win	0-6-1	(United States) Jerome McKinney	KO	2	19/11/1983	Hammond Civic Center, Hammond, Indiana, United States	McKinney knocked out at 1:31 of the second round.
Loss	6-4	(United States) Gary Gibson	TKO	5	18/10/1983	Tropicana Hotel & Casino, Atlantic City, New Jersey, United States	Referee stopped the bout at 2:40 of the fifth round.
Loss	5-0	(United States) Mike Mungin	TKO	4	07/09/1983	Hammond Civic Center, Hammond, Indiana, United States	
Win	--	(Italy) John Schirico	KO	1	05/07/1983	Eagles Club, Milwaukee, Wisconsin, United States	Schirico knocked out at 0:37 of the first round.
Win	1-6	(United States) Adrian Green	UD	6	03/01/1983	Chicago, Illinois, United States	
Win	2-1	(United States) Stan Cooper	KO	4	13/12/1982	Aragon Ballroom, Chicago, Illinois, United States	
Win	--	(Republic of Ireland) Brandon Quarry	TKO	3	17/11/1982	Hammond Civic Center, Hammond, Indiana, United States	
Loss	14-1	(United States) Ronnie Shields	TKO	2	02/10/1982	Sands Atlantic City, Atlantic City, New Jersey, United States	Referee stopped the bout at 1:37 of the second round.
Loss	6-2	(United States) Harold Brazier	MD	6	28/09/1982	Holiday Star Theatre, Merrillville, Indiana, United States	
No Contest	17-21-3	(United States) Tom Tarantino	NC	2	08/12/1981	Eagles Club, Milwaukee, Wisconsin, United States	
Win	0-3-3	(United States) Jeff Gettemy	UD	4	30/11/1981	Park West Theater, Chicago, Illinois, United States	
Win	2-0	(United States) Len Santana	KO	2	03/01/1981	Des Moines, Iowa, United States	
Loss	1-0	(United States) Ralph Twinning	TKO	3	04/06/1979	Bridgeview, Illinois, United States	
Loss	0-0-1	(United States) Robert Hughes	MD	4	17/03/1979	Alumni Hall (DePaul University), Chicago, Illinois, United States	
Win	2-1	(United States) Tony Ketchinakow	PTS	4	28/02/1979	Alumni Hall (DePaul University), Chicago, Illinois, United States	
Win	0-1	(United States) Imara Epesi	KO	2	02/02/1979	Aragon Ballroom, Chicago, Illinois, United States	
Win	0-1-1	(United States) Bob Al Hughes	UD	10	06/06/1977	Chicago, Illinois, United States	
Win	1-0	(United States) Larry Johnston	KO	3	19/05/1977	Chicago, Illinois, United States	
Win	1-1	(United States) Jorge Vasquez	UD	4	07/04/1977	Chicago, Illinois, United States	
