= Kenji Kanō =

Japanese sports promoter

- 嘉納 健治
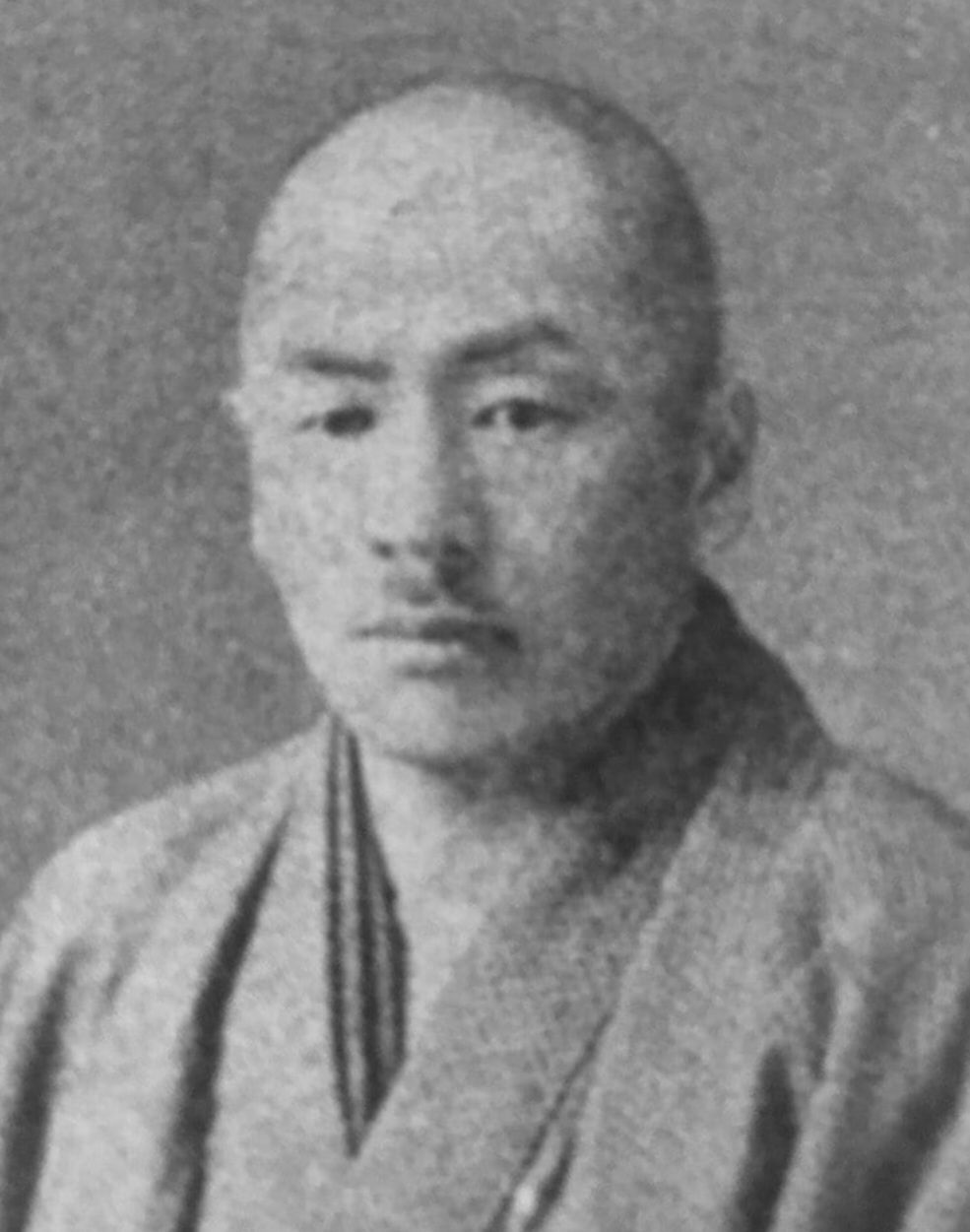
- Born: September 24, 1881; Hyōgo, Empire of Japan
- Died: October 30, 1947 (aged 77)
- Occupations: MMA promoter; boxing promoter; Founder of the Dai Nippon Boxing Association (大日本拳闘会)
- Known for: Organizing and promoting jūkken matches; Development of professional boxing in Japan

Kenji "Pisuken" Kano (嘉納 健治, Kanō Kenji, September 24, 1881 – October 30, 1947) was a Japanese yakuza and boxing and mixed martial arts promoter, the founder of the International Jūkken Club (国際柔拳倶楽部) which promoted Jūkken matches between judo practitioners and boxers. He was also the founder of the Dai Nippon Boxing Association (aka Dai Nippon Kentōkai; 大日本拳闘会). His promotional activities was instrumental to the popularization of boxing in Japan. He was the cousin of Jigorō Kanō, the founder of judo.

== Early life and education ==
Kenji Kanō was born on September 24, 1881 in Mikage, Hyōgo, (present day Kobe), Japan. He has been commonly described as a nephew to Jigorō Kanō, although research has shown he was actually a younger cousin.

He was a student on Kanō's private boarding school the Kanō Juku. As a youth, Kanō earned the nickname 'Pisuken' (ピス健), derived from 'pistol' and 'ken' (拳, fist) when he acquired a pistol from a sailor and practiced shooting to improve his marksmanship. He later became one of the most important yakuza oyabun of eastern Japan.

== Career ==
In 1909, Kanō founded the International Jūkken Club, headquartered in Hyōgo (present day Kobe), Japan. At the Jūkken club, sailors from all over the world would congregate and train. The club served as a platform for organizing and promoting hybrid matches between judo fighters and boxers. These contests were initially aimed at testing the effectiveness of judo as a combat sport against boxing while providing entertainment for Japanese audiences. Kanō's vision was to create a space where traditional and modern martial arts could coexist and evolve. Kanō also organized and promoted matches between different styles of martial arts such as, "Wrestling vs Sumo," "Judo vs Sumo," and "Judo vs Wrestling." The International Jūkken Club was a significant institution in the history of Japanese combat sports.

The International Jūkken Club eventually became the Dai Nippon Boxing Association. Kanō's efforts introduced boxing techniques to Japan, contributing to the development of the sport in the country. His fighting events helped lay the foundation for professional boxing in Japan.

Kanō's work not only popularized boxing in Japan but also helped establish a framework for hybrid competitions, also known as mixed martial arts competitions which influenced the evolution of Japanese martial arts.
