= Gary Holmgren =

American boxer

Gary Holmgren is an American former professional boxer who competed from 1974 to 1984.

== Professional career ==
Holmgren made his professional debut on May 15, 1974, with a first-round knockout win against Milton Buckley in St Paul, Minnesota. His first loss came in only his second fight, a five-round points loss to Bruce Finch, who would go on to make a name for himself as a welterweight contender. Holmgren would follow up that loss with a stretch in which he won 16 of 17 fights, including a decision win against 21-2 Rory O'Shea in 1975. Holmgren's career peaked in January 1983 when he won the Minnesota junior middleweight title by defeating Rafael Rodriguez on points in a ten-rounder. Holmgren retired afterwards, having compiled a career record of 22 wins and 5 losses, with 12 wins coming by way of knockout.

== Professional boxing record ==
22 Wins (12 knockouts, 10 decisions), 5 Losses (2 knockouts, 3 decisions)
| Result | Record | Opponent | Type | Round | Date | Location | Notes |
| Loss | 14-0 | (United States) Brian Brunette | SD | 10 | February 1, 1984 | (United States) Saint Paul, Minnesota, U.S. | Lost Minnesota light middleweight title |
| Win | 28-20-1 | (United States) Rafael Rodriguez | UD | 10 | January 25, 1983 | (United States) Saint Paul, Minnesota, U.S. | Won Minnesota light middleweight title |
| Win | 51-25-2 | (United States) Bruce Strauss | PTS | 10 | October 7, 1981 | (United States) Saint Paul, Minnesota, U.S. | |
| Win | 1-5 | (United States) Darrell "Ageless Wonder" Green | KO | 4 | May 6, 1981 | (United States) Saint Paul, Minnesota, U.S. | |
| Loss | 34-3 | (United Kingdom) Dave Boy Green | TKO | 6 | January 27, 1981 | (United Kingdom) Kensington, England | Referee stopped the bout at 2:38 of the sixth round. |
| Win | 2-5 | (United States) "Boxing" Tony Taylor | UD | 10 | October 29, 1980 | (United States) Saint Paul, Minnesota, U.S. | |
| Win | 13-18 | (United States) Emmett Atlas | KO | 2 | March 19, 1980 | (United States) Saint Paul, Minnesota, U.S. | |
| Loss | 6-3 | (United States) Tyrone Wren | PTS | 6 | June 29, 1978 | (United States) Saint Paul, Minnesota, U.S. | |
| Win | 40-31-4 | (United States) Al Franklin | UD | 10 | December 9, 1976 | (United States) Saint Paul, Minnesota, U.S. | |
| Win | 25-4-1 | (United States) Rory "Stylish Irish" O'Shea | UD | 10 | November 9, 1976 | (United States) Saint Paul, Minnesota, U.S. | |
| Win | -- | Moses Gregg | KO | 2 | October 11, 1976 | (United States) Evanston, Indiana, U.S. | |
| Win | 6-18-1 | (United States) Harvey "Candyman" Wilson | KO | 1 | August 4, 1976 | (United States) Mounds View, Minnesota, U.S. | |
| Win | 2-23-4 | (United States) Ron Pettigrew | KO | 6 | June 30, 1976 | (United States) Saint Paul, Minnesota, U.S. | |
| Win | 0-4 | (United States) Woody "Walden Tweed" Harris | UD | 6 | April 22, 1976 | (United States) Bloomington, Minnesota, U.S. | |
| Win | 3-35-2 | (United States) Jerry Wells | UD | 6 | January 22, 1976 | (United States) Saint Paul, Minnesota, U.S. | |
| Win | 2-2 | (United States) Dennis Haggerty | KO | 1 | November 25, 1975 | (United States) Globe, Arizona, U.S. | |
| Win | 0-3 | (United States) Woody "Walden Tweed" Harris | PTS | 5 | November 13, 1975 | (United States) Bloomington, Minnesota, U.S. | |
| Loss | 3-4 | (United States) Ricardo Thomatis | TKO | 3 | June 6, 1975 | (United States) Minneapolis, Minnesota, U.S. | |
| Win | 23-2-1 | (United States) Rory "Stylish Irish" O'Shea | SD | 6 | April 23, 1975 | (United States) Bloomington, Minnesota, U.S. | |
| Win | 7-4-1 | (United States) Efran Maldonado | KO | 1 | March 19, 1975 | (United States) Minneapolis, Minnesota, U.S. | |
| Win | 4-4 | (United States) Timothy "Tim" Adams | PTS | 6 | February 3, 1975 | (United States) Minneapolis, Minnesota, U.S. | |
| Win | 1-0 | (United States) Jim "Bad Ass" Hearn | KO | 4 | December 3, 1974 | (United States) Saint Paul, Minnesota, U.S. | |
| Win | 0-1 | (United States) Bobby "Bruin" Orr | KO | 1 | August 28, 1974 | (United States) Saint Paul, Minnesota, U.S. | |
| Win | 1-5 | (United States) Johnny "O.J." Simpson | TKO | 2 | July 31, 1974 | (United States) Bloomington, Minnesota, U.S. | |
| Win | -- | (United States) Maurice Sanders | TKO | 2 | June 26, 1974 | (United States) Saint Paul, Minnesota, U.S. | |
| Loss | 3-0-1 | (United States) Bruce Finch | PTS | 5 | May 23, 1974 | (United States) Minneapolis, Minnesota, U.S. | |
| Win | -- | (United States) Milton Buckley | KO | 1 | May 15, 1974 | (United States) Saint Paul, Minnesota, U.S. | |

== Retirement ==
Holmgren retired from professional boxing after 27 fights. He went on to become a firefighter, rising to captain in a 22-year career.
