= Maurice Watkins (boxer) =

American boxer

Maurice Watkins (born August 29, 1956) is a former boxer from Houston, Texas. Nicknamed Termite, he was born into a family that was in the insect killing business, and he is a professional fumigator.

== Professional Boxing Career ==
Watkins turned professional as a boxer on May 21, 1974, beating Cesar Cortez by knockout in round one at Houston. Through his career, Watkins fought some of the best fighters in the Lightweight and Jr. Welterweight divisions. He beat Marion Thomas by a knockout in round seven, Rocky Ramon by a decision in twelve, Arturo Leon by decision in ten, Bruce Strauss by knockout in three, Bobby Rodriguez by knockout in one, and others. His fight with former United States Lightweight champion Norman Goins resulted in a three-round no contest. He also lost to Olympic gold medalist Howard Davis Jr. and Alfredo Escalera. On October 2 of 1980, at the Caesars Palace hotel in Las Vegas, Nevada, he got his only world title shot, losing to Saoul Mamby by a fifteen-round decision for the WBC's world Jr. Welterweight title. He retired with 61 wins, 5 losses, 2 draws (tie), one no contest and 48 wins by knockout.

== Professional boxing record ==
61 Wins (42 knockouts, 19 decisions), 5 Losses (0 knockouts, 5 decisions), 2 Draws, 1 No Contest
Result	Record	Opponent	Type	Round	Date	Location	Notes
Win	1-1	(Mexico) Yaqui Hernandez	PTS	6	16/03/1990	Phoenix, Arizona, United States	
Win	12-10-1	(United States) Robert "The Line" Dixon	TKO	2	17/02/1990	Conroe, Texas, United States	
Win	14-3-4	(United States) Joe "Attorney" Garcia	PTS	10	11/12/1989	Pasadena Convention Center, Pasadena, Texas, United States	
Win	7-7-1	(United States) Moses "Governor" Robinson	KO	2	05/10/1989	Houston, Texas, United States	
Win	4-4	(United States) "Candlelight" Virgil Green	KO	3	10/08/1989	Billings, Montana, United States	
Win	--	(Mexico) Raymundo Lopez	KO	2	20/07/1989	Tucson Convention Center, Tucson, Arizona, United States	
Win	1-0-1	Carlos "Rocky" Gonzalez	KO	1	01/06/1989	Phoenix, Arizona, United States	
Win	6-1-1	(United States) Anthony "Two Gun" Williams	PTS	6	30/04/1989	Galveston, Texas, United States	57-57, 58-56, 57-57.
Loss	48-12-3	(Puerto Rico) Alfredo Escalera	UD	10	12/11/1982	(Florida) Orange Bowl, Miami, United States	
Win	4-14	(United States) Paul Gentry	KO	4	22/09/1982	(Texas) Houston, United States	
Win	0-1	(Mexico) Jose "J-Rod" Rodriguez	KO	10	27/08/1982	(Texas) Houston, United States	
Win	60-34-3	(United States) Bruce Strauss	KO	3	17/08/1982	Blackham Coliseum, Lafayette, Louisiana, United States	
Win	2-0	(United States) Billy "The Kid" Smith	KO	3	21/07/1982	Shreveport, Louisiana, United States	
Loss	28-12-5	(United States) Saoul Mamby	UD	15	02/10/1980	(Nevada) Caesars Palace, Las Vegas, United States	WBC World Light Welterweight Title. 140-146, 139-147, 141-147.
Win	17-24	(United States) Larry "Legend" Moore	KO	3	22/05/1980	Holland, Michigan, United States	
Win	23-25	(United States) Sammy Rookard	KO	4	06/04/1980	(Texas) Astro Arena, Houston, United States	
Win	3-2-1	(The Bahamas) Nathan "Famous" Davis	KO	3	22/03/1980	Grand Rapids, Michigan, United States	
Win	0-11	(United States) Jimmy "Wakeboard" Martinez	KO	1	09/01/1980	Holland, Michigan, United States	
Loss	11-0	(United States) Howard Davis, Jr.	UD	10	14/09/1979	Houston Summit, Houston, Texas, United States	
Win	2-8	(United States) Roberto "Baby" Perez	KO	7	15/08/1979	Beaumont Civic Center, Beaumont, Texas, United States	
Draw	9-4-1	(Dominican Republic) Teodoro Osuna	PTS	10	09/03/1979	(New York (state)) Madison Square Garden, New York City, United States	
Win	1-3-1	(United States) Richie Lee Roberts	KO	3	16/01/1979	(Texas) Houston, United States	
Win	2-1-1	(The Bahamas) Arthur "Space Odyssey" Clarke	KO	7	09/12/1978	(Texas) Houston, United States	
Win	0-6	(United States) Gary "Black" Smith	KO	5	02/11/1978	Orlando, Florida, United States	
Win	16-11-1	(United States) Rick Craney	KO	1	15/08/1978	(Texas) Houston, United States	
Win	21-19-1	(United States) Joe Medrano	KO	7	16/05/1978	(Texas) Houston, United States	
Win	1-8-2	(United States) John "Wolf" Morgan	KO	4	20/04/1978	(Texas) Houston, United States	
Win	15-6	(United States) Hilbert Stevenson	PTS	10	11/04/1978	Orlando, Florida, United States	
Win	5-1	(Puerto Rico) Benny Marquez	PTS	10	19/01/1978	(Texas) Houston, United States	
Win	10-1	(United States) Steve "Hammer" Homan	PTS	10	01/12/1977	(Texas) Houston, United States	
Win	15-10	(United States) Freddie "Stepper" Harris	PTS	10	25/10/1977	Orlando, Florida, United States	
Win	--	Cuyo Mendoza	TKO	3	27/09/1977	Orlando, Florida, United States	
Win	6-4	(Mexico) Paulino Garcia	TKO	5	22/09/1977	Curtis Hixon Hall, Tampa, Florida, United States	
Win	12-11	(Puerto Rico) Ernesto Ortega	KO	7	26/07/1977	Orlando, Florida, United States	
No Contest	17-5-1	(United States) "Stormin" Norman Goins	ND	10	22/03/1977	Memorial Coliseum, Corpus Christi, Texas, United States	
Win	7-2	(United States) Jose "Speedy" Gonzalez	PTS	10	16/02/1977	Orlando, Florida, United States	
Loss	4-10	(Mexico) Augustin Estrada	UD	10	17/11/1976	(Texas) Convention Center Arena, San Antonio, United States	90-98, 93-94, 97-98.
Win	2-2	(United States) Otto Breeding	KO	3	26/10/1976	Orlando, Florida, United States	
Win	13-11-1	(United States) Arturo Leon	UD	10	21/09/1976	Corpus Christi, Texas, United States	
Win	14-6	(United States) Rocky Ramon	PTS	12	31/08/1976	Corpus Christi, Texas, United States	
Win	4-7	(Mexico) Agustin Estrada	TKO	7	09/08/1976	(Louisiana) Municipal Auditorium, New Orleans, United States	
Win	4-3	(United States) Richie Puentes	KO	6	24/07/1976	Biloxi, Mississippi, United States	
Loss	18-5-2	(Dominican Republic) Adriano Marrero	SD	10	16/03/1976	Miami Beach Convention Center, Miami Beach, Florida, United States	
Win	2-5	(Mexico) Valente Ramos	KO	3	09/03/1976	Orlando, Florida, United States	
Win	4-4	(United States) Lamar Baskin	KO	2	24/02/1976	Albuquerque Civic Auditorium, Albuquerque, New Mexico, United States	
Win	0-1	Chamaco Cuenca	KO	5	10/02/1976	Miami Beach Convention Center, Miami Beach, Florida, United States	
Win	13-0	(Dominican Republic) Juan "and Only" Hidalgo	UD	10	20/01/1976	Miami Beach Convention Center, Miami Beach, Florida, United States	
Win	--	(United States) Bobby Flores	TKO	6	18/11/1975	(Texas) Houston, United States	
Win	9-2-1	(United States) Larry Peterson	KO	5	19/08/1975	Orlando, Florida, United States	
Win	0-1-2	(United States) Gene Prado	UD	10	29/07/1975	Circle Star Theater, San Carlos, California, United States	
Win	31-10-1	(United States) Marion "Tiger" Thomas	KO	7	16/07/1975	(Texas) Houston, United States	
Win	6-3-4	(United States) Victor de la Cruz	UD	10	17/06/1975	San Jose Civic Auditorium, San Jose, California, United States	
Win	7-4	(United States) Leroy Walker	TKO	8	21/05/1975	Circle Star Theater, San Carlos, California, United States	
Win	0-1	(Mexico) Rudy Gonzalez	PTS	10	06/05/1975	San Jose, California, United States	
Win	4-4-1	(United States) Otis Locklear	KO	3	22/04/1975	Orlando, Florida, United States	
Win	2-5	(The Bahamas) Mike Whymms	PTS	8	15/04/1975	Orlando, Florida, United States	
Win	9-2	(United States) Gilbert "Machete" Galvan	PTS	10	17/02/1975	Memorial Coliseum, Corpus Christi, Texas, United States	
Win	8-6	(United States) Dave Kibby	UD	8	29/01/1975	(California) Cow Palace, San Francisco, United States	
Win	4-4-1	(United States) Vicente Hernandez	PTS	10	17/01/1975	San Jose Civic Auditorium, San Jose, California, United States	
Win	0-2	(The Bahamas) "Sugar" Ray Sears	PTS	6	17/12/1974	Orlando, Florida, United States	
Win	--	(Mexico) Robert "Baby" Perez	KO	1	10/11/1974	Corpus Christi, Texas, United States	
Win	23-7-2	(United States) Bobby Rodriguez	KO	1	13/10/1974	Corpus Christi, Texas, United States	
Win	0-3	(United States) Ricky Ramos	KO	4	26/08/1974	Corpus Christi, Texas, United States	
Win	13-13	(United States) Nick Alfaro	PTS	8	18/08/1974	(Texas) Houston, United States	
Win	0-2	(United States) Arturo Cirillos	KO	3	05/08/1974	Corpus Christi, Texas, United States	
Win	5-9	(United States) Harvey "Candyman" Wilson	KO	6	16/07/1974	(Texas) Houston, United States	
Win	0-1	(United States) Arturo Cirillos	TKO	4	02/07/1974	(Texas) Houston, United States	
Win	1-3	(United States) Lupe Cantù	KO	3	04/06/1974	(Texas) Houston, United States	
Win	0-1	Cesar Cortez	KO	1	21/05/1974	(Texas) Houston, United States	

== After Boxing ==
After retiring, Watkins went back to Texas to work as a fumigator. In 2003, the American military, needing personnel to work rebuilding Iraq's infrastructure, contracted him as a fumigator to work on Iraqi homes that had been decaying and infected with insects during Saddam Hussein's presidency.

In 2008, writer Suzy Pepper, a former neighbor of Maurice Watkins, released "Termite", a biographical book about Watkins. Also in 2008, a movie based on the book was announced.

== In Iraq ==
After the IOC announced that Iraq would be allowed to compete in seven sports at the 2004 Olympics in Athens, including boxing, the United States military set about to find a new boxing coach for the Iraqi national boxing team. With research, they found out about Watkins' background, and invited him to coach a team of young hopefuls in Baghdad. Realizing he needed to train the team in a setting different from Baghdad, he moved his team to a city close to Baghdad, but much quieter than the capital city. He trained nine Iraqi boxers who hoped to reach the Olympics, but only Najah Ali was able to qualify for the games.
