= Tyrone Everett =

American boxer

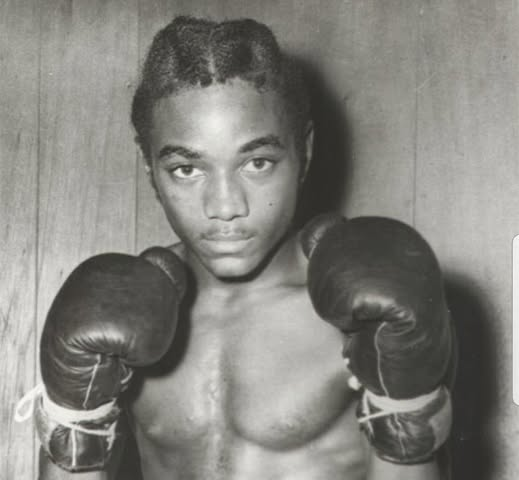
- Everett c. 1975

Personal information
- Born: Tyrone Everett; April 18, 1953 Philadelphia, Pennsylvania, United States
- Died: May 26, 1977 (aged 24) Philadelphia, Pennsylvania, United States
- Height: 5 ft 4 in (1.63 m)
- Weight: Junior lightweight

Boxing career
- Stance: Southpaw

Boxing record
- Total fights: 37
- Wins: 36
- Win by KO: 20
- Losses: 1
- Draws: 0
- No contests: 0

Tyrone Everett (April 18, 1953 – May 26, 1977) was a professional boxer from Philadelphia, Pennsylvania, United States. He was a top-rated contender in the junior lightweight division during the 1970s. His best known fight is a controversial decision loss to World Boxing Council Junior Lightweight Champion Alfredo Escalera on November 30, 1976. Everett was killed by his girlfriend on May 26, 1977, after she found him with a transvestite.

== Boxing career ==
In his early teens, Everett was inspired to start boxing after a kid who lived across the street from the Everett home showed him a boxing trophy he had won. Everett briefly quit after losing an amateur bout to Jerome Artis, but Jimmy Arthur, who trained Everett, convinced him to return to the gym.

Known as "The Mean Machine," Everett was a sublimely skilled southpaw. The Associated Press called him "a classic boxer, using the ropes, deceptive power and skillful counter-punching." In the book Philadelphia's Boxing Heritage 1876-1976, the authors stated that Everett "could do everything that champion Pernell Whitaker could do, and Everett was a harder puncher."

Everett turned professional in 1971 and eventually made enough money to buy a bar, two apartment houses and a Cadillac. "Money is the only reason I'm fighting," he once said. "Man, you gotta be out of your mind to say you like to fight. Who wants to get in the ring and get beat up?"

He also dreamed of winning a world title. "I see myself coming into the ring. I have the championship belt around my waist ... and the lights go down, and the spotlight hits me. I hear all the girls in the audience screaming, 'Whoo-eee, look at Tyrone Everett.' How can I lose with all these girls screaming at me?" Everett said.

On November 30, 1976, Everett challenged Alfredo Escalera for the World Boxing Council Junior Lightweight Championship at the Spectrum in Philadelphia. After fifteen rounds, Escalara was awarded a highly controversial split decision victory over the slick southpaw. Tom Cushman of the Philadelphia Daily News wrote:

"Tyrone Everett won the junior lightweight championship of the world last night. Won it with a whirling, artistic, courageous performance that brushed against the edges of brilliance. Tyrone was standing tall, proud, bleeding in his corner after the 15 rounds, waiting for the championship belt to be draped around his waist, when they snatched it from him. Picked him so clean it’s a wonder they didn’t take his shoes and trunks along with everything else."

Veteran boxing judge Harold Lederman listed the verdict as the most controversial decision of all-time. He said it "may be history's worst decision."

At the time of Everett's death, he was scheduled to have a rematch with Escalera in Puerto Rico in June 1977.

Everett, who had a professional record was 36-1 with 20 knockouts, was inducted into the Pennsylvania Boxing Hall of Fame in 2006.

His younger brothers, Mike and Eddie Everett, were also professional boxers. In honor of their brother, they present The Everett Brothers Award annually to an outstanding amateur boxer from Philadelphia.

== Death ==
On May 26, 1977, Everett was shot and killed by his girlfriend, Carolyn McKendrick, after she came home and found him with a transvestite named Tyrone Price.

Everett was found alone in a second-floor bedroom at McKendrick's home. He died minutes later at a hospital from a gunshot wound to the head. The bullet had struck him in the face, exited out the back of his head, went through a window and was found on the sidewalk across the street.

The Associated Press reported that packets of heroin, some marijuana and unidentified pills were found by police downstairs on the dining room table.

Everett lived with McKendrick at her row house in South Philadelphia. She was married but separated. McKendrick, a mother of two, left her husband of almost three years in 1974 and started dating Everett the following year.

McKendrick was seen leaving her house with Price shortly after the murder.

A warrant was issued for McKendrick's arrest, and she went to police headquarters with her attorney and turned herself in on May 31. She was charged with murder, possession of an instrument of crime, and possession of heroin. At the time of her arrest, McKendrick was free on probation following convictions the previous year on weapons and narcotics charges and for receiving stolen property.

Price agreed to testify against McKendrick under a grant of immunity.

During her trial, McKendrick testified that she came home earlier than expected on May 26 after helping her sister with an errand and found the door locked by a chain. "When Tyrone finally came to the door, there was sweat on his face, he was stuttering and his voice was nervous," she said. "I followed him upstairs, noticed the bed was a mess and saw some keys and change on the floor. But Tyrone denied anyone else was in the house. But I found Price hiding in my children's bedroom."

She told the court that she felt threatened when Everett raised his hand and moved toward her. McKendrick said she picked up his gun, which was on a chest of drawers, fired once and ran from the room. "I didn't know the shot had hit Tyrone," she testified. "I thought he was still coming at me."

McKendrick said she feared Everett because he regularly beat her. "He beat me at least once every two weeks," she testified, "and the beatings became more severe as he got more prominent in the ring."

The prosecution argued that McKendrick shot Everett out of anger when he refused to answer questions about who had been in the rumpled bed with him.

Price showed up in court wearing women's clothes, earrings and artificial breasts. Speaking in a high feminine voice, he testified that he sold drugs for Everett and McKendrick, who denied any involvement with drugs.

Price denied defense charges that he had been sexually involved with Everett, but he told the court that he knew four homosexuals who said they'd had sexual relationships with Everett.

He further testified that Everett taunted McKendrick and tried to strike her before he was shot, but Price placed himself between them. He told the jury that McKendrick hit him on the head with the gun and then pointed it at Everett.

On December 2, 1977, McKendrick was convicted of third-degree murder and possession of an instrument of crime, but she was acquitted on the charge of heroin possession. A jury of eight men and four women deliberated for 2½ hours before reaching the decision. On June 28, 1979, she was sentenced to five-to-ten years in prison.

== Grave ==
Everett, who had four children before he died and another one after his death, was buried in an unmarked grave at Eden Cemetery in Collingdale, Pennsylvania.

John DiSanto, a fight fan who grew up in Philadelphia, went to Eden Cemetery in 2005 to pay his respects at Everett's grave. "But I couldn't find his grave," DiSanto said. "Then I saw there was no stone or marker where he was buried, just grass. I was struck by his story and had been doing a website devoted to Philadelphia boxing history for about a year. I thought this would just be an extension of what I was doing — honoring these guys with something worth caring about."

DiSanto's website, PhillyBoxingHistory.com, established a program dedicated to placing headstones on the unmarked graves of Philadelphia boxers. Everett was the first honoree.

On December 10, 2005, members of Everett's family — his mother, Doris, and his brothers, Mike and Eddie — were on hand for the placement of Everett's headstone.
