= KeyHoleTV =

- KeyHoleTV 1.23 running on Kubuntu Linux
- Stable release: 4.25(Windows) 2.8(Mac OS 10.6) 2.1(Linux) / November 1, 2012; 12 years ago
- Operating system: Windows, Linux, Mac, iOS
- Available in: Japanese, English
- Type: P2PTV
- License: Freeware
- Website: http://www.oiseyer.com/index3-e.php

KeyHoleTV is an online television portal that links to Japanese television channels, radio stations, and user-made channels. KeyHoleTV only has a narrow selection of channels, such as TV Asahi, NHK General TV, NHK Educational TV, Fuji TV, TBS, TV Tokyo, Tokyo MX and Nippon TV. Most are analog and some of the applied channels are password protected. However, it does have the US Military's AM radio station in Japan AFN Tokyo Eagle 810.

== KeyHoleVideo ==
KeyHoleVideo is a program that functions like KeyHoleTV. The main difference is that anyone with audio/video capture hardware can broadcast their own feed. Other various options like quality control and picture-in-picture (for the broadcaster's feed) have been added. This allows broadcasters to watch as they upload while maintaining a consistent stream.

== Compatibility ==
- Windows 2000 Service Pack 4*
- Windows XP
- Windows Vista
- Windows 7
- Windows Mobile 5.0／6.0 (Viewing only)
- Mac OS X 10.4, 10.5, 10.6, 10.7, 10.8 (Viewing only)
- Linux (Viewing only)
- iPhone (Viewing only)

*Windows 2000 Service Pack 4 requires DirectX9.0c or more and GDIPlus.
