= Kuniaki Shibata =

Japanese boxer (born 1947)

Personal information
- Born: Kuniaki Shibata; March 29, 1947 (age 79) Hitachi, Japan
- Height: 5 ft 4 in (163 cm)
- Weight: Featherweight; Super-featherweight

Boxing career
- Reach: 63 1/2 in (161 cm)
- Stance: Orthodox

Boxing record
- Total fights: 56
- Wins: 47
- Win by KO: 25
- Losses: 6
- Draws: 3

Kuniaki Shibata (柴田 国明, born March 29, 1947) is a Japanese former professional boxer who competed from 1965 to 1977. He is a world champion in two weight classes, having held the World Boxing Council (WBC) and Ring magazine featherweight titles from 1970 to 1972, the World Boxing Association (WBA) and Ring magazine super-featherweight titles in 1973, and the WBC super-featherweight title from 1974 to 1975.

== Biography ==
Shibata won his debut match in 1965 with a first-round knockout, and fought for the Oriental and Pacific Boxing Federation featherweight title in 1969, but lost by sixth-round knockout. In April 1970 he challenged for the vacant Japanese featherweight title, and won by tenth-round knockout. He relinquished the title to challenge WBC featherweight champion Vicente Saldivar, and won the title when Saldivar gave up after the twelfth round.

He made his first defense by first-round knockout, and retained his title in his second defense with a draw, but lost to Clemente Sanchez in May, 1972.

Shibata moved up to super featherweight, and got his second world title shot against Lineal and WBA champion Ben Villaflor in Honolulu on March 12, 1973. He won by fifteen-round unanimous decision to capture his second world title.

Shibata made one defense in Japan before returning to the United States to fight Ben Villaflor again for his second defense. Shibata lost by knockout less than 2 minutes into the first round to lose his second world title.

On February 28, 1974, he challenged Ricardo Arredondo for the WBC super featherweight title, and won by unanimous decision for his third world title. He defended the title three times before losing to Alfredo Escalera in 1975. He attempted another comeback, but announced his retirement in 1977. His record was 47-6-3 (25 KOs).

Shibata was a short and speedy fighter, who took advantage of even the slightest openings to throw in a flurry of punches. However, he also had a very weak chin, and was very susceptible to counter punches. Five of his six career losses were by knockout. He and former WBC lightweight champion Guts Ishimatsu were gym mates, and both fighters were trained by Eddie Townsend.

== Professional boxing record ==
56 fights	47 wins	6 losses
By knockout	25	5
By decision	22	1
Draws	3	

No.	Result	Record	Opponent	Type	Round	Date	Location	Notes
56	Win	47–6–3	Al Espinosa	PTS	10	Nov 29, 1975	Korakuen Hall, Japan	
55	Win	46–6–3	Susumu Okabe	UD	10	Oct 10, 1975	Korakuen Hall, Japan	
54	Win	45–6–3	Tamio Negishi	UD	10	Mar 22, 1975	Akita City, Japan	
53	Loss	44–6–3	Alfredo Escalera	KO	2 (15), 2:56	Jul 5, 1975	Kasamatsu Athletic Park Gym, Hitachinaka, Japan	Lost WBC super-featherweight title
52	Win	44–5–3	Abdelkader Ould Makhloufi	UD	15	Mar 27, 1975	Kyuden Gym, Fukuoka, Japan	Retained WBC super-featherweight title
51	Win	43–5–3	Ramiro Bolanos	KO	15 (15), 2:29	Oct 3, 1974	Nihon University Auditorium, Japan	Retained WBC super-featherweight title
50	Win	42–5–3	Antonio Amaya	MD	15	Jun 27, 1974	Nihon University Auditorium, Japan	Retained WBC super-featherweight title
49	Win	41–5–3	Ricardo Arredondo	UD	15	Feb 28, 1974	Nihon University Auditorium, Japan	Won WBC super-featherweight title
48	Loss	40–5–3	Ben Villaflor	KO	1 (15), 1:56	Oct 17, 1973	Honolulu International Center, Honolulu, Hawaii, U.S.	Lost WBA and The Ring super-featherweight titles
47	Win	40–4–3	Nam Chul Chung	KO	2 (10), 0:49	Sep 3, 1973	Hitachi, Japan	
46	Win	39–4–3	Victor Federico Echegaray	UD	15	Jun 19, 1973	Nihon University Auditorium, Japan	Retained WBA and The Ring super-featherweight titles
45	Win	38–4–3	Ben Villaflor	UD	15	Mar 12, 1973	Honolulu International Center, Honolulu, Hawaii, U.S.	Won WBA and The Ring super-featherweight titles
44	Win	37–4–3	Kimio Shindo	KO	7 (10), 2:12	Feb 3, 1973	Sendai, Japan	
43	Loss	36–4–3	Andries Steyn	PTS	10	Oct 7, 1972	Ellis Park Tennis Stadium, Johannesburg, South Africa	
42	Win	36–3–3	Bert Nabalatan	UD	10	Jul 11, 1972	Honolulu International Center, Honolulu, Hawaii, U.S.	
41	Loss	35–3–3	Clemente Sánchez	KO	3 (15), 2:26	May 19, 1972	Nihon University Auditorium, Japan	Lost WBC and The Ring featherweight titles
40	Draw	35–2–3	Ernesto Marcel	SD	15	Nov 11, 1971	Ehime Rugby Stadium, Matsuyama, Japan	Retained WBC and The Ring featherweight titles
39	Win	35–2–2	Hyun Kim	UD	10	Aug 1, 1971	Nagoya, Japan	
38	Win	34–2–2	Raul Cruz	KO	1 (15), 3:04	Jun 3, 1971	Metropolitan Gym, Japan	Retained WBC and The Ring featherweight titles
37	Win	33–2–2	Vicente Garcia	PTS	10	Mar 7, 1971	Hitachi, Japan	
36	Win	32–2–2	Vicente Saldivar	RTD	12 (15), 3:00	Dec 11, 1970	Auditorio Municipal, Tijuana, Mexico	Won WBC and The Ring featherweight titles
35	Win	31–2–2	Hyun Kim	UD	10	Sep 9, 1970	Japan	
34	Draw	30–2–2	Jose Acosta	MD	10	Jul 8, 1970	Korakuen Hall, Japan	
33	Win	30–2–1	Yasuo Sakurai	KO	10 (10), 0:44	Apr 15, 1970	Japan	Won vacant Japanese featherweight title
32	Win	29–2–1	Felipe Torres	UD	10	Feb 4, 1970	Japan	
31	Win	28–2–1	Flash Besande	KO	3 (10), 1:56	Oct 22, 1969	Osaka, Japan	
30	Win	27–2–1	Fernando Sotelo	KO	9 (10), 1:07	Sep 10, 1969	Japan	
29	Win	26–2–1	Yoshio Ando	KO	8 (10), 2:58	Jun 11, 1969	Japan	
28	Win	25–2–1	Kid Barrios	KO	1 (10), 2:10	Apr 28, 1969	Japan	
27	Win	24–2–1	Koji Ikeda	PTS	10	Mar 24, 1969	Japan	
26	Loss	23–2–1	Hubert Kang	KO	6 (12), 1:14	Jan 15, 1969	Japan	For OPBF featherweight title
25	Win	23–1–1	Orlando Medina	UD	10	Oct 23, 1968	Korakuen Hall, Japan	
24	Draw	22–1–1	Toshiharu Mori	TD	3 (10), 0:38	Aug 14, 1968	Japan	
23	Win	22–1	Beto Maldonado	PTS	10	Jul 3, 1968	Korakuen Hall, Japan	
22	Loss	21–1	Dwight Hawkins	KO	7 (10), 1:14	Mar 27, 1968	Korakuen Hall, Japan	
21	Win	21–0	Ramiro Nides	PTS	10	Mar 1, 1968	Recreation Center, Agana, Guam	
20	Win	20–0	Tiny Palacio	KO	5 (10), 1:51	Jan 31, 1968	Japan	
19	Win	19–0	Soo Bok Kwon	KO	2 (10), 1:19	Dec 27, 1967	Japan	
18	Win	18–0	Chang Bok Lee	KO	2 (10), 1:50	Dec 5, 1967	Hitachi, Japan	
17	Win	17–0	Chang Soo Yun	RTD	9 (10), 3:00	Nov 15, 1967	Gifu, Japan	
16	Win	16–0	Roy Amolong	UD	10	Sep 20, 1967	Korakuen Hall, Japan	
15	Win	15–0	Roberto Andrade	KO	5 (10), 2:05	Aug 9, 1967	Korakuen Hall, Japan	
14	Win	14–0	Katsutoshi Aoki	KO	1 (10), 1:52	Jul 5, 1967	Japan	
13	Win	13–0	Hyun Kim	PTS	10	Mar 5, 1967	Japan	
12	Win	12–0	Hiroshi Miyata	KO	4 (10), 1:47	Feb 12, 1967	Japan	
11	Win	11–0	Alberto Reyes	PTS	10	Jan 15, 1967	Japan	
10	Win	10–0	Kenji Fuse	KO	2 (8), 1:52	Dec 11, 1966	Japan	
9	Win	9–0	Atsushi Gunji	KO	6 (8), 2:51	Oct 23, 1966	Japan	
8	Win	8–0	Masachika Tokutome	KO	5 (6), 1:16	Jan 31, 1966	Osaka, Japan	
7	Win	7–0	Takao Suzuki	KO	1 (6), 1:50	Dec 20, 1965	Japan	
6	Win	6–0	Toshihiko Nojiri	PTS	4	Nov 1, 1965	Japan	
5	Win	5–0	Yoshinobu Yokoyama	KO	1 (4), 0:34	Sep 27, 1965	Japan	
4	Win	4–0	Masaru Miyazaki	PTS	4	Sep 2, 1965	Japan	
3	Win	3–0	Norio Sugimoto	KO	1 (4), 1:40	Jul 28, 1965	Japan	
2	Win	2–0	Hitoshi Yoshino	KO	1 (4), 0:58	Apr 5, 1965	Japan	
1	Win	1–0	Seiichi Iizuka	KO	1 (4), 1:40	Mar 6, 1965	Japan	

== Titles in boxing ==
=== Major world titles ===
- WBC featherweight champion (126 lbs)
- WBA super-featherweight champion (130 lbs)
- WBC super-featherweight champion (130 lbs)

=== The Ring magazine titles ===
- The Ring featherweight champion (126 lbs)
- The Ring super featherweight champion (130 lbs)

=== Regional/International titles ===
- Japanese featherweight champion (126 lbs)

== See also ==
- List of super featherweight boxing champions
- Lineal championship
- List of WBA world champions
- List of WBC world champions
- List of Japanese boxing world champions
- Boxing in Japan

Sporting positions
World boxing titles
Preceded by Vincente Saldívar	WBC featherweight champion December 11, 1970 – May 19, 1972	Succeeded by Clemente Sánchez
Preceded by Vincente Saldívar	The Ring featherweight champion December 11, 1970 – May 19, 1972	Succeeded by Clemente Sánchez
Preceded by Ben Villaflor	WBA super-featherweight champion March 12, 1973 – October 17, 1973	Succeeded by Ben Villaflor
Preceded by Ben Villaflor	The Ring super-featherweight champion March 12, 1973 – October 17, 1973	Succeeded by Ben Villaflor
Preceded by Ricardo Arredondo	WBC super-featherweight champion February 28, 1974 – July 5, 1975	Succeeded by Alfredo Escalera
