= Bruce Strauss =

American boxer (born 1952)

Bruce Strauss (Ruben Bardot)
Personal information
- Nickname: The Mouse
- Born: Bruce Strauss; February 6, 1952 (age 74) Omaha, Nebraska, United States
- Height: 5 ft 6 in (1.68 m)
- Weight: Middleweight

Boxing career
- Stance: Orthodox

Boxing record
- Total fights: 135
- Wins: 77
- Win by KO: 55
- Losses: 53
- Draws: 5
- No contests: 0

Bruce Strauss (born February 6, 1952) is an American retired boxer who competed in the middleweight division, his nickname was The Mouse. He achieved notoriety in the 1970s and 1980s after fighting, and generally losing, to a wide variety of opponents, with him also being known for his cheery, easy-going personality. His life was made into the well-received 1997 comedy-drama film The Mouse, in which he was portrayed by actor John Savage.

Generally a middleweight using a "colorful" fighting style, Strauss opened his career on June 1, 1976, with a four-round decision win over Gary Maize (also listed as "Gary Maiza") in Oklahoma City, Oklahoma. He has estimated that he has fought over 300 times over the years, with most matches taking place through using aliases and other forms of subterfuge to get around rules. His long career took him to multiple continents and saw him facing a large group of opponents.

== Career and personal life ==
First dubbed "Mousie" during his school years in New Milford, New Jersey, Strauss began intensive bodybuilding while in high school. From his early boxing days, he was often described as a "journeyman", a title given to fighters who typically fight anyone and anywhere, often on short notice. Nevertheless, he became famous around boxing circles because of the number of fights he lost by knockout. Officially, he lost 28 fights by knockout out of a total of 53 losses, but it has been estimated that, combined with his fights using the Ruben Bardot alias, he might have actually lost more than 150 fights by knockout. He himself has made mockery of his knockout loss number, stating that he is "probably the only boxer in history that has lost by knockout on every continent."

He once joked that the only reason that he hadn't fought and lost in Antarctica was that he hated being cold. In a 1990 Kayo boxing cards set, he posed while sitting on the canvas, with black make-up covering his eye, as he held on to a ring rope. As stated before, he would sometimes use the alias of "Ruben Bardot" to obtain fights.

Strauss has revealed that he got around rules forcing boxers to wait a certain amount of time, over a month, before fighting again by measures such as donning disguises and filling his pockets with lead to change his weight class. The book Boxing in America: An Autopsy labeled him a "colorful" fighter that became "something of a legend". It remarked as well that he "made a habit of doing whatever it took to survive at times", noting how Strauss once quipped to a referee upset with Strauss' unfair low blows that "Well, it ain't fair that he's better than me, neither."

A 1997 article in The New York Times described Strauss as a "tireless but inept 'professional opponent'", while also comparing him to "the stock caricature of the cuddly loudmouthed palooka." The newspaper also stated, "For Bruce, losing isn't just a reliable way of make a living, it's his personal philosophy." Strauss has declared that most of his matches weren't done in his own name, having fought (and mostly lost) more than three hundred times in his long career in his estimation.

His career began on June 1, 1976, in Oklahoma City, Oklahoma, when Strauss debuted as a professional boxer. Outpointing Gary Maize (also listed as 'Gary Maiza') after four rounds, he soon set off on the road. His first official knockout defeat came at the hands of Mauricio Aldana on January 10, 1979, fighting in Las Vegas. Strauss also lost fights by knockout in Africa (Cameroon, South Africa), Europe (France, Germany, and Italy), South America (Peru), and Oceania (Fiji). It is unclear whether he actually lost a fight by knockout in Australia or Asia under the "Ruben Bardot" alias.

Strauss fought a number of top challengers and world champions in the middleweight division, including Charlie Weir, Bobby Czyz, Eckhard Dagge, Al Ford, Billy Collins, Mike McCallum, Marlon Starling, David Braxton, and Davey Hilton, among others. He also fought former World Lightweight Champion Harry Arroyo.

His last official fight was a six-round decision win over Terry Jesmer on November 24, 1989. The match took place in Bismarck, North Dakota inside the city's Civic Center.

Strauss officially has a record of 78 wins, 53 losses, and 6 draws (ties), although it has also been reported as 77 wins compared to 53 losses and 6 ties. He is additionally reported to have, officially, 55 knockout wins and 28 knockout losses. As remarked before, he typically fought as a middleweight and used an orthodox stance.

In 1997, a movie was released based on his career entitled The Mouse, in which actor John Savage portrayed him. Written and directed by Dan Adams, the comedy-drama film also starred actress Angelica Torn as Mary Lou Strauss, the Mouse's wife. The movie received praise from publications such as The New York Times. Also featuring comedian Rip Torn, the film featured a number of cameo appearances from well-known boxers such as Randall "Tex" Cobb, Ray Mancini, Vito Antuofermo, and Sean O'Grady.

== Professional boxing record ==
77 wins (55 knockouts, 22 decisions), 53 losses (28 knockouts, 25 decisions), 6 draws
Result	Record	Opponent	Type	Round	Date	Location	Notes
Win	13-22-2	(Canada) Terry Jesmer	UD	6	24/10/1989	Bismarck, North Dakota, United States	
Win	0-7	(United States) Dave Reynolds	KO	3	27/05/1989	Bismarck, North Dakota, United States	
Win	--	(United States) Howard Stern	KO	6	04/03/1989	Bismarck, North Dakota, United States	
Loss	37-5	(United States) Harry Arroyo	TKO	2	26/01/1989	(New York (state)) Rochester, New York, United States	
Loss	5-39	(United States) Wayne Grant	SD	6	13/08/1988	Saint Joseph, Missouri, United States	
Win	5-35	(United States) Wayne Grant	UD	6	09/04/1988	Joplin, Missouri, United States	
Win	0-4	(United States) Dave Reynolds	TKO	6	04/03/1988	Bismarck, North Dakota, United States	
Win	--	Ron Falk	KO	6	02/11/1986	Macy, Nebraska, United States	
Win	3-18	(United States) Wayne Grant	KO	8	01/11/1985	Louisville, Kentucky, United States	
Win	3-17	(United States) Wayne Grant	UD	8	01/10/1985	Lebanon Junction, Kentucky, United States	
Win	0-1	(United States) Al Bell	KO	4	14/06/1985	Louisville, Kentucky, United States	
Loss	22-1-1	(United States) Danny Ferris	UD	8	16/03/1985	(New York (state)) Troy, New York, United States	
Win	--	"Diamond" Jim McLean	PTS	4	22/02/1985	Hammond, Indiana, United States	
Win	11-13-1	(United States) Clyde Beattie	UD	8	01/02/1985	(New York (state)) Troy, New York, United States	
Loss	8-0	(United States) Ken Snider	UD	8	23/01/1985	Indianapolis, Indiana, United States	
Loss	5-0	(United States) Jeff Silva	UD	6	09/11/1984	Peoria, Illinois, United States	
Loss	7-0	(United States) Ken Snider	PTS	6	30/10/1984	Evansville, Indiana, United States	
Loss	17-1	(United States) Mike Hutchinson	KO	3	27/10/1984	Tuscaloosa, Alabama, United States	
Loss	5-0	(United States) Jack Callahan	UD	6	23/10/1984	Highland, Lake County, Indiana, United States	
Win	13-8	(United States) Pete "Polish Hammer" Podgorski	SD	8	10/07/1984	Highland, Lake County, Indiana, United States	
Draw	19-0	(United States) Danny Ferris	PTS	8	06/06/1984	Atlantic City, New Jersey, United States	5-3, 4-4, 3-4.
Win	0-12	(United States) Billy Doyle	KO	6	16/05/1984	Fort Wayne, Indiana, United States	
Win	12-7	(United States) Billy Turner	KO	3	23/03/1984	Rapid City, South Dakota, United States	
Draw	10-5-2	(United States) Mike Pollitt	PTS	6	13/03/1984	Highland, Lake County, Indiana, United States	
Loss	9-5-2	(United States) Mike Pollitt	PTS	5	07/02/1984	Highland, Lake County, Indiana, United States	
Loss	13-0	(United States) Brian Brunette	TKO	6	08/12/1983	Saint Paul, Minnesota, United States	
Loss	16-0	(Canada) Dave Hilton, Jr.	KO	3	29/07/1983	Cornwall, Ontario, Canada	
Loss	30-1-3	(Peru) Fernando Rocco Castro	KO	4	30/04/1983	Lima, Peru	
Draw	9-4-1	(United States) Mike Pollitt	PTS	6	12/04/1983	Indianapolis, Indiana, United States	
Loss	7-0	(United States) Monte Oswald	KO	3	05/03/1983	Bay City, Michigan, United States	
Loss	7-0-1	(France) Helier Custos	KO	2	24/02/1983	Paris, France	
Loss	19-2-1	(United States) Wilbert Johnson	KO	2	25/01/1983	Indianapolis, Indiana, United States	Strauss knocked out at 2:25 of the second round.
Win	--	Richard Thomas	KO	6	08/01/1983	Davenport, Iowa, United States	
Win	8-3-1	(United States) Mike Pollitt	TKO	5	08/12/1982	Omaha, Nebraska, United States	
Loss	7-3-1	(United States) Mike Pollitt	PTS	5	03/11/1982	Indianapolis, Indiana, United States	
Win	--	Fred Morris	KO	4	27/10/1982	West Fargo, North Dakota, United States	
Loss	4-5	(United States) Harlen Holden	TKO	7	13/10/1982	Chicago, Illinois, United States	Referee stopped the bout at 1:55 of the seventh round.
Loss	8-26-2	(United States) Lester Groves	SD	8	07/10/1982	Winnipeg, Manitoba, Canada	
Loss	51-4-1	(United States) Maurice Watkins	KO	3	17/08/1982	Lafayette, Louisiana, United States	
Loss	37-5-2	(Fiji) Sakaraia Ve	KO	3	03/07/1982	Suva, Fiji	
Win	12-5	(United States) Billy Turner	KO	7	24/05/1982	Deadwood, South Dakota, United States	
Loss	4-0	(United States) "Irish" Billy Collins, Jr.	KO	3	20/05/1982	Atlantic City, New Jersey, United States	
Win	0-11	(United States) Nick Wills	KO	6	20/04/1982	Fargo, North Dakota, United States	
Loss	36-6	(United States) Dale Hernandez	PTS	10	06/04/1982	Omaha, Nebraska, United States	
Loss	21-7	(Germany) Jean-Andre Emmerich	PTS	8	26/03/1982	Kiel, Schleswig-Holstein, Germany	
Win	0-3	(United States) Pete Susens	UD	6	18/03/1982	Dodge City, Kansas, United States	
Win	3-19	(United States) Larry Puchta	PTS	10	17/03/1982	Sioux Falls, South Dakota, United States	
Win	0-1	(United States) Charlie Keller	KO	7	25/02/1982	Sioux Falls, South Dakota, United States	
Loss	54-16	(Canada) Al Ford	UD	10	12/02/1982	Winnipeg, Manitoba, Canada	96-98, 95-99, 98-99.
Loss	16-1	(France) Jean-Marie Emebe	KO	3	30/01/1982	Yaounde, Cameroon	
Win	4-1	(United States) Willie Dean	KO	5	31/12/1981	Indianapolis, Indiana, United States	Dean knocked out at 1:40 of the fifth round.
Draw	11-2	(Canada) Ghyslain Deroy	PTS	10	10/12/1981	Winnipeg, Manitoba, Canada	96-97, 99-94, 98-98.
Loss	26-13-2	(United States) Larry Stanton	KO	3	30/11/1981	(New York (state)) Richmond Hill, New York, United States	
Loss	22-4	(United States) Danny Long	PTS	8	25/11/1981	Boston, Massachusetts, United States	
Win	8-26-2	(United States) Charlie Peterson	TKO	4	05/11/1981	Merrillville, Indiana, United States	Referee stopped the bout at 0:49 of the fourth round.
Win	0-2	(United States) Pete Susens	TKO	6	24/10/1981	Dodge City, Kansas, United States	
Win	0-2	(United States) Darrell Miller	KO	4	10/10/1981	Kansas City, Missouri, United States	
Loss	20-4	(United States) Gary "Hammer" Holmgren	PTS	10	07/10/1981	Saint Paul, Minnesota, United States	
Loss	25-4-1	(Germany) Eckhard Dagge	PTS	8	25/09/1981	Cologne, Nordrhein-Westfalen, Germany	
Win	--	(United States) Tommy Degen	PTS	8	20/09/1981	Grand Island, Nebraska, United States	
Loss	5-2-2	(Canada) Gordie Lawson	KO	5	04/09/1981	Vancouver, British Columbia, Canada	
Win	--	(United States) Nicky Jefferson	KO	4	28/08/1981	Omaha, Nebraska, United States	Jefferson knocked out at 2:27 of the fourth round.
Win	4-3-1	(United States) Ken Reed	KO	5	23/08/1981	Grand Island, Nebraska, United States	
Loss	4-2-2	(Canada) Gordie Lawson	PTS	8	07/08/1981	Port Alberni, British Columbia, Canada	
Win	0-1	(United States) Charlie Powell	TKO	4	23/07/1981	Winnipeg, Manitoba, Canada	
Loss	7-0	(Jamaica) Mike "Bodysnatcher" McCallum	TKO	3	19/07/1981	Warren, Ohio, United States	
Win	0-7	(United States) Nick Miller	KO	4	13/06/1981	Gary, Indiana, United States	
Win	12-29-2	(United States) Billy Goodwin	SD	10	06/06/1981	Amery, Wisconsin, United States	97-95, 96-99, 97-95.
Win	12-28-2	(Canada) Jo Jo Jackson	SD	6	08/05/1981	Winnipeg, Manitoba, Canada	
Loss	22-10-1	(United States) Bobby Plegge	PTS	8	26/04/1981	Canton, Ohio, United States	
Loss	13-1	(United States) David Braxton	TKO	4	23/04/1981	Detroit, Michigan, United States	
Win	3-3	(United States) Mark Hughes	KO	8	06/04/1981	Bloomington, Minnesota, United States	
Win	5-0-1	(United States) Jimmy Baker	PTS	6	28/03/1981	Chicago, Illinois, United States	
Loss	2-3	(United States) Mark Hughes	SD	6	19/03/1981	Saint Joseph, Missouri, United States	
Loss	13-0	(United States) Marlon "Magic Man" Starling	KO	2	09/02/1981	Hartford, Connecticut, United States	Strauss knocked out at 1:20 of the second round.
Loss	35-7	(United States) Tony McMinn	KO	5	31/01/1981	Miami, Oklahoma, United States	
Win	--	(United States) Rowan Johnson	KO	5	11/01/1981	Saint Louis, Missouri, United States	
Win	4-6	(United States) Ernie Davis	PTS	8	11/12/1980	Kansas City, Missouri, United States	
Win	0-1	(United States) Pete Susens	KO	6	01/11/1980	Wichita, Kansas, United States	
Win	--	(United States) Darrell Ned Miller	KO	5	30/10/1980	Louisville, Kentucky, United States	
Win	--	Malcolm "X" Gordon	TKO	2	28/10/1980	Indianapolis, Indiana, United States	
Loss	13-1	(United States) Danny Paul	TKO	4	30/09/1980	Niles, Illinois, United States	Referee stopped the bout at 2:34 of the fourth round.
Loss	10-0	(United States) Johnny Compo	UD	8	23/09/1980	Edmonton, Alberta, Canada	36-38, 36-38, 35-36.
Win	--	(United States) Charlie Keller	KO	10	06/09/1980	Sioux Falls, South Dakota, United States	
Win	--	Dave Holmgren	KO	6	30/08/1980	North Platte, Nebraska, United States	
Win	--	(United States) Dave Gordon	KO	5	29/08/1980	Grand Island, Nebraska, United States	
Win	0-1	(United States) Dave Grant	KO	5	24/07/1980	Winnipeg, Manitoba, Canada	Grant knocked out at 0:52 of the fifth round.
Win	0-5	(United States) Nick Miller	KO	4	18/07/1980	Grand Island, Nebraska, United States	
Loss	4-0	(United States) Bobby Czyz	KO	4	17/07/1980	Totowa, New Jersey, United States	
Win	12-4	(United States) Billy Turner	KO	5	28/06/1980	Rapid City, South Dakota, United States	
Win	0-2	(United States) Billy "The Kid Evans	KO	3	20/06/1980	Fort Wayne, Indiana, United States	
Win	0-9	(United States) Nick Wills	KO	3	18/06/1980	Struthers, Ohio, United States	
Loss	4-0-1	(United States) Charles LaCour	SD	8	13/06/1980	Nanaimo, British Columbia, Canada	
Win	6-14	(United States) Dave Bolden	PTS	8	06/06/1980	Kansas City, Missouri, United States	
Win	--	(United States) Rodney Foster	KO	3	13/05/1980	Indianapolis, Indiana, United States	
Win	--	Ron Madsap	KO	3	26/04/1980	Hastings, Iowa, United States	
Loss	27-8-1	(United States) Ralph Racine	KO	5	24/04/1980	Winnipeg, Manitoba, Canada	
Win	--	Darryl Springer	KO	4	19/04/1980	Council Bluffs, Iowa, United States	
Loss	13-1	(United States) Nino Gonzalez	TKO	8	01/04/1980	Totowa, New Jersey, United States	
Loss	75-5-4	(Argentina) Juan Jose Gimenez	KO	5	29/03/1980	Rome, Lazio, Italy	
Win	--	(United States) Ralph Jackson	TKO	2	16/03/1980	Omaha, Nebraska, United States	
Win	4-1	(United States) O'Dell Willis	PTS	6	07/03/1980	Kansas City, Missouri, United States	
Loss	7-1	(United Kingdom) Dave Simmonds	PTS	10	29/02/1980	Nanaimo, British Columbia, Canada	
Loss	16-2	(South Africa) Charlie Weir	TKO	1	09/02/1980	Johannesburg, South Africa	
Win	--	(United States) Frank Patterson	TKO	4	20/12/1979	Wichita, Kansas, United States	
Win	--	"Tiny" Tim Ellis	KO	2	14/12/1979	Evansville, Indiana, United States	
Win	--	(United States) Dave Reynolds	TKO	3	08/12/1979	Winnipeg, Manitoba, Canada	Referee stopped the bout at 1:30 of the third round.
Win	--	(United States) Billy Evans	TKO	3	02/12/1979	Muncie, Indiana, United States	
Draw	--	(The Bahamas) Macon Davis	PTS	4	27/11/1979	Miami Beach, Florida, United States	
Loss	21-7-1	(Trinidad and Tobago) Eddie Marcelle	TKO	7	16/11/1979	Mucurapo, Trinidad and Tobago	
Win	0-1	Tim Mullens	TKO	4	01/11/1979	Wichita, Kansas, United States	
Win	--	Tim Mullens	TKO	5	27/10/1979	Regina, Saskatchewan, Canada	
Win	--	(Canada) Bryan Thompson	TKO	3	09/10/1979	Winnipeg, Manitoba, Canada	Referee stopped the bout at 1:17 of the third round.
Loss	19-1	(United States) Pat Hallacy	UD	10	18/09/1979	Wichita, Kansas, United States	
Loss	1-3	(United States) Charlie Peterson	PTS	8	18/07/1979	Indianapolis, Indiana, United States	
Win	1-3	(United States) Cicero Blake	TKO	6	25/06/1979	Omaha, Nebraska, United States	
Draw	3-8	(Canada) Terry Jesmer	PTS	6	14/06/1979	Winnipeg, Manitoba, Canada	
Win	4-2	(United States) Floyd Pearson	UD	6	11/06/1979	Chicago, Illinois, United States	
Win	0-1	(Canada) Ali Ayub	TKO	8	31/05/1979	Brandon, Manitoba, Canada	Referee stopped the bout at 2:59 of the eighth round.
Win	4-3	(United States) Larry Mayes	TKO	6	12/05/1979	Wichita, Kansas, United States	
Win	0-5	(United States) Larry Puchta	PTS	5	04/05/1979	Saint Paul, Minnesota, United States	
Win	7-6-2	(United States) Clyde Spencer	TKO	5	28/04/1979	Omaha, Nebraska, United States	
Win	2-3	(United States) Ossie Quast	UD	6	20/04/1979	Winnipeg, Manitoba, Canada	29-27, 30-26, 29-26.
Loss	2-0	(United States) Steve Kruger	PTS	5	16/03/1979	Saint Paul, Minnesota, United States	
Win	--	(United States) Nick Miller	TKO	4	14/03/1979	Marshalltown, Iowa, United States	
Win	1-3	(United States) Roy Taylor	PTS	4	08/03/1979	Wichita, Kansas, United States	
Win	--	(United States) Dave Grant	KO	5	28/02/1979	Saint Paul, Minnesota, United States	
Win	2-2	(United States) Ossie Quast	PTS	6	14/02/1979	Saint Paul, Minnesota, United States	
Loss	16-5	(United States) Ivy Brown	KO	1	19/01/1979	Overland Park, Kansas, United States	
Loss	2-2	(United States) Mauricio Aldana	TKO	1	10/01/1979	Las Vegas, Nevada, United States	
Win	0-1	(United States) Bill Thompson	TKO	3	29/11/1978	Council Bluffs, Iowa, United States	
Win	0-17	(Italy) Nino Cosmo	PTS	6	21/09/1978	Jersey City, New Jersey, United States	
Win	5-2-1	(United States) Clyde Spencer	KO	3	15/11/1977	Oklahoma City, United States	
Loss	5-5	(United States) Hank Gregory	PTS	6	26/08/1976	Kansas City, Missouri, United States	
Win	1-0	(United States) Tony McMinn	KO	3	02/06/1976	Topeka, Kansas, United States	
Win	0-2	Gary Maiza ('Gary Maize')	PTS	4	01/06/1976	Oklahoma City, United States	

== See also ==
- Journeyman (boxing)
