= Corey Rodriguez =

American boxer

Corey Rodriguez is a retired professional super welterweight boxer from Minneapolis, Minnesota.

== Personal life ==
Rodriguez is a native of Minneapolis, and a graduate of Robbinsdale Cooper High School in New Hope, Minnesota

== Amateur career ==
Corey Rodriguez had a long and successful amateur career.

== Professional career ==
Rodriguez made his professional debut against John Hoffman on September 29, 2007, winning by first round TKO. He compiled four straight wins to start his career, before losing at majority decision to 10-0 Dave Peterson in 2009. Rodriguez endured a difficult stretch from his fifth through his eleventh bouts, recording two wins, three losses, and two draws during that period, culminating in a loss by technical decision to Jamal James on October 27, 2012.

Following the loss to James, Rodriguez's record in his next seven fights was 6-0-1, and he won the vacant Minnesota State Super Welterweight title against Stephen Watt in the main event of a boxing show in Minneapolis on June 13, 2014. In Rodriguez's next bout on August 2, 2014 he won a unanimous decision against 13-2-1 Brandon Quarles of Alexandria, Virginia. Following a period of inactivity Rodriguez announced his retirement at age 35 on December 31, 2014 finishing with a record of; won 12, lost 3, and drawn 3 boxing matches in his professional career.
