= Aaron Pryor vs. Alexis Argüello =

Boxing competition

The Battle of The Champions
- Date: November 12, 1982
- Venue: Miami Orange Bowl, Miami, Florida, U.S.
- Title(s) on the line: WBA and The Ring light welterweight title

Tale of the tape
Boxer	Aaron Pryor	Alexis Argüello
Nickname	The Hawk	El Flaco Explosivo ("The Explosive Thin Man")
Hometown	Cincinnati, Ohio, U.S.	Managua, Managua Department, Nicaragua
Purse	$1,600,000	$1,500,000
Pre-fight record	31–0 (29 KO)	76–4 (62 KO)
Age	27 years	30 years, 6 months
Height	5 ft 6 1/2 in (169 cm)	5 ft 10 in (178 cm)
Weight	140 lb (64 kg)	139 lb (63 kg)
Style	Orthodox	Orthodox
Recognition	WBA and The Ring; Light Welterweight Champion	WBC and The Ring; Lightweight Champion; 3-division world champion

Result
- Pryor wins via 14th-round TKO

Aaron Pryor vs. Alexis Argüello, billed as The Battle of the Champions, was a boxing fight for the WBA world Junior Welterweight title. The contest's nickname was coined by promoter Bob Arum, regarding the light welterweight boxing super match on November 12, 1982.

== Background ==
Arguello had previously won three boxing titles (at Featherweight, Junior Lightweight and Lightweight) and hoped to become the first boxer ever to win world titles in four divisions by adding the Jr. Welterweight title. The broadcaster, HBO, had televised two of Arguello's previous fights. Pryor had no previous telecasts on that network, despite a record of 31 wins and no losses, with 29 knockouts.

Both fighters had radically opposing public images. Arguello was extremely humble about his impressive accomplishments, which garnered him great admiration from both the boxing community and the media . Pryor, on the other hand, was intimidating and despite possessing great talent and having been a peer of greats Sugar Ray Leonard and Thomas Hearns, was the recipient of limited media coverage.

== The fight ==
The fight was beset with a number of controversies and odd happenings, the first coming before the bout started, when a man with a weapon tried to gain access to Arguello's dressing room. He was stopped by members of the public, and Arguello was rushed by his handlers into a shower and shielded. The man later was arrested.

The fight began without further incident. A pattern quickly emerged, as right from the opening bell Pryor charged recklessly at Arguello with combinations, while Arguello stood still in the middle of the ring, parrying or blocking Pryor's punches while counterattacking with his trademark precise, hard, straight punches. Both fighters were hurt in the first round, and each took the opportunity to punish each other.

The tone was set for the fight. Pryor tried to increase the tempo, moving more, punching more, hitting Arguello with slashing combinations while Arguello stayed true to his strategy, summarized before the fight as "I don't have to hit him many times in each round, but I do have to make sure that every time I hit him it hurts", waited for counterpunching opportunities and used both his own strength and Pryor's momentum from coming forward to try to make every blow as explosive and painful as possible. In every round each fighter would have their high points, and every round became difficult to score.

For a time Pryor looked to be gaining control of the fight and winning a string of rounds in the middle of the fight, but Arguello came back in rounds 9 through 11, particularly in round 11 where he battered Pryor with a number very hard shots, seemingly shifting the momentum of the fight in favor of Arguello. However, controversy would now raise its head for a second time that evening.

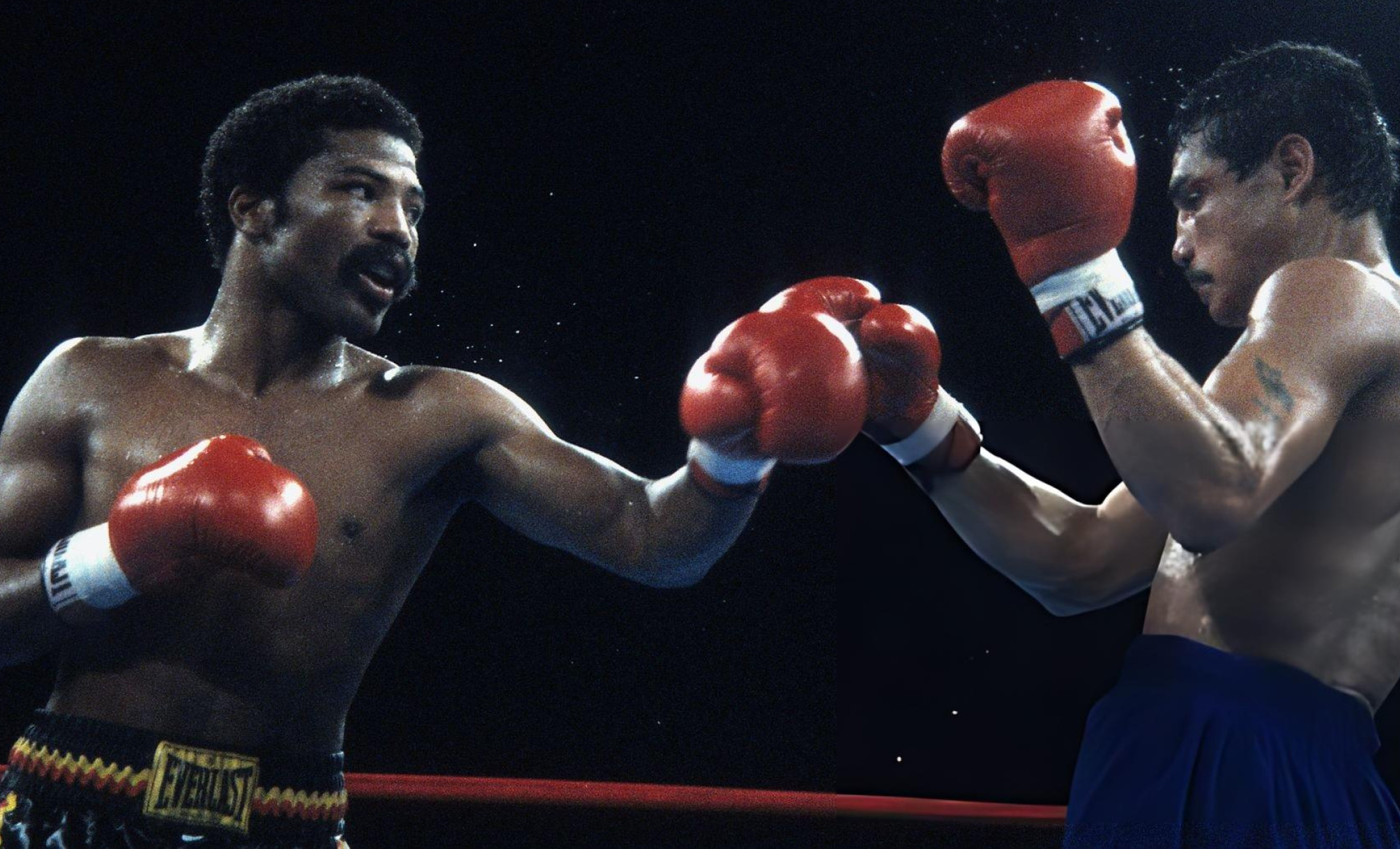

Between rounds it was noticed that a second, thus far unused water bottle was put into use in Pryor's corner. Pryor took control in the 12th round, but Arguello attempted to match him blow for blow. In the 13th round Arguello hit Pryor with a tremendous punch, easily the hardest blow of the fight, but Pryor danced away and out of trouble. Once again between rounds Pryor's cornerman, Panama Lewis, could be heard requesting the second bottle, and telling an aide "Give me the other bottle. The one I mixed", when the aide offered the water bottle that had been used throughout the rest of the fight. That happened between the 13th and the 14th rounds, but Panama Lewis gave the mixed drink to Pryor as early as the 2nd round. Pryor battered Arguello around the ring for the first minute of the round, until a hard combination drove a staggering Arguello to the ropes, where Pryor proceeded to land a brutal series of almost twenty unanswered punches that nearly sent Arguello out of the ring. The proud Arguello refused to go down, until referee Stanley Christodoulou of South Africa stepped in to stop the fight, at which point Arguello collapsed to the canvas. His cornermen rushed to his side, afraid that Arguello had been seriously hurt.

== Aftermath ==
The fight became known as the "fight of the decade" by The Ring.

Both the oddities surrounding the water bottles and Pryor's response to its use were noticed after the bout. It was also reported that Pryor did not undertake a drug test following the bout, his team responded that no-one had approached them for a urine sample. A rematch was ordered, which took place 10 months after the first bout. Both had different trainers for the rematch, with Arguello having fired Eddie Futch, blaming Futch for his loss. He later apologised to Futch, calling it "the biggest mistake of my life". Pryor's trainer Panama Lewis had lost his license for removing padding from Luis Resto's gloves before his fight with Billy Collins Jr. As a result, Pryor hired Richie Giachetti to train him for the rematch, but they had disagreements and Pryor replaced him with Emanuel Steward.

In the rematch, Pryor won by a 10th-round knockout of another exciting contest where Pryor sent Arguello to the canvas three times but Arguello staggered Pryor briefly in the second round, and both fighters retired following the bout. Driven by financial problems and cocaine addictions, both would later come out of retirement. During his comeback, Arguello knocked out former champion Billy Costello in four rounds. Pryor was also largely successful in his comebacks, although he would suffer the only loss of his career in one of them. Eventually, it was discovered during a medical test that Pryor had significantly lost vision in one of his eyes, and after that he was denied a boxing license.

Arguello entered politics later in his native Nicaragua, while Aaron Pryor became a Christian minister. Both Arguello and Pryor are members of the International Boxing Hall of Fame, and the two formed a deep friendship since their bout. Most notably, Pryor traveled to Nicaragua to support Arguello's political career, and the two met several times a year until Arguello's death, apparently by a self-inflicted gunshot, in 2009. Pryor died on October 9, 2016.

Arguello was the flag carrier for Nicaragua in the 2008 Summer Olympics.

In a 2009 documentary, former Lewis-trained boxer Luis Resto revealed that Panama Lewis would break apart antihistamine pills and pour the medicine into his water, giving him greater lung capacity in the later rounds of a fight. This revelation fueled further speculation as to whether Lewis had added an unsanctioned substance to Pryor's water in his bout with Arguello.

In 2018, both Argüello and Pryor were inducted into the Nevada Boxing Hall of Fame. Their eponymous sons Alexis Argüello, Jr. (a former Stony Brook Seawolves men's lacrosse player and later Sports Emmy Award winning CBS Sports producer) and Aaron Pryor, Jr. (a former boxer and coach) represented their fathers.

== Undercard ==
Confirmed bouts:

== Broadcasting ==
Country	Broadcaster
Mexico	Televisa
Philippines	MBS 4
Puerto Rico	Telemundo
United Kingdom	ITV
United States	HBO

Preceded by vs. Akio Kameda	Aaron Pryor's bouts 12 November 1982	Succeeded by vs. Kim Sang-hyun
Preceded by vs. Kevin Rooney	Alexis Argüello's bouts 12 November 1982	Succeeded by vs. Vilomar Fernandez
