= Ken Buchanan vs. Roberto Durán =

Boxing match

- Date: June 26, 1972
- Venue: Madison Square Garden, New York City, New York, U.S.
- Title(s) on the line: WBA and The Ring lightweight titles

Tale of the tape
Boxer	Ken Buchanan	Roberto Durán
Nickname	The Fighting Carpenter	Manos de Piedra ("Hands of Stone")
Hometown	Edinburgh, Scotland, UK	Panama City, Panama Province, Panama
Purse	$125,000	$35,000
Pre-fight record	43–1 (16 KO)	28–0 (24 KO)
Age	26 years, 11 months	21 years
Height	5 ft 7 1/2 in (171 cm)	5 ft 7 1/2 in (171 cm)
Weight	133 1/2 lb (61 kg)	132 1/4 lb (60 kg)
Style	Orthodox	Orthodox
Recognition	WBA and The Ring; Lightweight Champion	WBA; No. 1 Ranked Lightweight

Result
- Durán wins via TKO in the 13th round

Ken Buchanan vs. Roberto Durán was a professional boxing match contested on June 26, 1972, for the WBA and The Ring lightweight title.

== Background ==
In May 1972, it was announced that the reigning WBA lightweight champion would face the number-one ranked contender Roberto Durán in Madison Square Garden on June 26th, two days before Buchanan's 27th birthday. Heavily anticipated, Buchanan was given a $125,000 purse, a then-record for a fighter in the lightweight division. Buchanan had first won the lightweight title in 1970 after defeating Durán's countryman Ismael Laguna, the win propelled Buchanan into one of the boxing's top fighters and he was named the top fighter of 1970 by the American Boxing Writers' Association. The 21-year old Durán, meanwhile, was a perfect 28–0 with all but four of his wins coming by knockout and had quickly established himself as a top contender.

The brazen Durán predicted he would knockout the champion out "in 9 rounds or less", Buchanan however discredited Durán's impressive record claiming none of the fighters he had beaten previously had been a top fighter asking, "Who's He Beaten?’ He has a fair record, but he's not fought anybody. He's the No. 1 challenger, but who's he beaten? He's never fought anybody in the top ten. But the World Boxing Association told me I had to fight him because he's the No. 1 challenger. As long as he's legitimate, I'll fight the man."

Buchanan entered the fight as a slight 2–1 favorite. The fight drew a crowd of 18,821 and produced a gate of $223,901, a then-record for an indoor lightweight fight.

== The fight ==
Durán would be named the winner by technical knockout in the 13th round, but the result was highly controversial. Serving as the aggressor, Durán was able to control the fight and had built up a sizeable lead on the judge's scorecards prior to the stoppage while Buchannan struggled to both offensively and defensively. Durán would score a first round flash knockdown (the only one of the fight) after landing a right hand that caused Buchanan to place his gloves on the mat to break his fall. As the 13th and final round came to an end, both fighters continued to throw punches after the bell had sounded just before referee Johnny LoBianco could separate the pair, Durán landed a low blow that sent Buchanan down to the mat in obvious pain. Buchanan was able to get back up but had to be helped to his corner and after being checked by LoBianco, it was determined that Buchanan could not continue and the fight was stopped with Durán being named the winner by technical knockout despite Buchanan's insistence that he could continue with the fight.

== Aftermath ==
Both Durán and LoBianco maintained that Buchanan had been hit with a legal punch to the abdomen and not a low blow. Immediately after the fight LoBianco defended his decision explaining "They fought after the bell, but the punch that put Buchanan down was in the abdomen, not any lower. It was impossible for him to continue. He was groaning in terrible pain. But it wasn't that punch alone, it was a culmination. Buchanan was unable to continue." Durán meanwhile, dismissed Buchanan's claims that he had won with an illegal blow stating "A lot of boxers try to make you think they were hit low because they are losing. I won it legally." Buchanan insisted Durán had taken liberties in the fight not only with low blows, but also with headbutts and was critical of LoBianco's officiating claiming "I got no protection from the referee. No matter where I put my head, his (Duran's) head was there and it was cracking." A post-fight examination by A. Harry Kleiman of the New York State Athletic Commission backed up Buchanan's claims that he had been hit with a low blow confirming that Buchanan had "swelling of the right testicle. He’s in extreme pain."

== Fight card ==
Confirmed bouts:

Weight Class	Weight		vs.		Method	Round	Notes
Lightweight	135 lbs.	Roberto Durán	def.	Ken Buchanan (c)	TKO	13/15	^{Note 1}
Featherweight	126 lbs.	Walter Seeley	def.	David Vasquez	UD	8/8
Welterweight	147 lbs.	Marty Richardson	vs.	Tommy Roane	D	4/4
Heavyweight	200+ lbs.	Tommy Clark	def.	Manuel Collazo	UD	4/4

^Note 1 For WBA and The Ring Lightweight titles

Preceded by vs. Andries Steyn	Ken Buchanan's bouts 26 June 1972	Succeeded by vs. Carlos Ortiz
Preceded by vs. Francisco Munoz	Roberto Durán's bouts 26 June 1972	Succeeded by vs. Greg Potter
