= Ken Buchanan =

Scottish boxer (1945–2023)

Ken Buchanan MBE
- Buchanan in 1965

Personal information
- Nickname: Fighting Carpenter
- Born: 28 June 1945 Edinburgh, Scotland
- Died: 1 April 2023 (aged 77)
- Weight: Lightweight

Boxing career
- Stance: Orthodox

Boxing record
- Total fights: 69
- Wins: 61
- Win by KO: 27
- Losses: 8
Medal record
Boxing
Representing Scotland
European Championships
| Bronze medal – third place | 1965 Berlin | Featherweight |

Ken Buchanan (28 June 1945 – 1 April 2023) was a Scottish professional boxer who competed from 1965 to 1982. He held multiple championships at lightweight; the World Boxing Association (WBA) and Ring magazine titles from 1970 to 1972; and the World Boxing Council (WBC) title in 1971, briefly reigning as undisputed champion until being stripped of the WBC title four months later. At regional level he held the British title twice in 1968 and 1973, and the European title from 1974 to 1975.

== Boxing career ==
=== Early career ===
Before turning pro, Buchanan was the 1965 ABA featherweight champion. He started boxing professionally on 20 September 1965, beating Brian Tonks by a knockout in the second round in London. He spent much of the early parts of his career fighting undistinguished opponents in England. His Scottish debut came in his 17th fight, when he outpointed John McMillan over 10 rounds on 23 January 1967. Prior to that, he had also beaten Ivan Whiter by a decision in eight rounds.

=== Lightweight challenger ===
Buchanan extended his winning streak to 23 consecutive bouts before challenging Maurice Cullen on 19 February 1968 for the British lightweight title in London. He knocked Cullen out in the 11th round and became a world classified lightweight challenger.

He continued his way up the world lightweight rankings by defeating Leonard Tavarez, Angel Robinson Garcia and Whiter (in a rematch) among others, but on 29 January 1970, he found his first stone on the boxing road when he challenged future WBC junior welterweight champion Miguel Velasquez in Madrid, for the European lightweight title. Buchanan lost a 15-round decision to Velazquez, but nevertheless, he continued his ascent towards the number one spot in the rankings by beating Tavarez in a rematch, Chris Fernandez and Brian Hudson, the latter of whom was beaten by a knockout in five in a defence of the British lightweight title.

=== World champion ===
In September of that year, Buchanan travelled to Puerto Rico, where he would meet Ismael Laguna, the world lightweight champion from Panama, on 26 September 1970. Many experts believed San Juan's warm weather would affect Buchanan, but he upset those who thought that way and beat Laguna by a 15-round decision to become world's lightweight champion.

At that time, the WBA and the British Boxing Board of Control (BBBC), were in the middle of a feud, and Buchanan was not allowed to defend the WBA title fight in Great Britain. He finished 1970 beating Donato Paduano by a 10-round decision in a non-title bout on 7 December 1970.

Buchanan defeated Rubén Navarro in Los Angeles on 12 February 1971, defended the WBA championship, and acquired the vacant WBC championship.

And thus he became the undisputed world lightweight champion.

After that, Buchanan was allowed to defend the world championship fight in Great Britain. Buchanan defeated former world junior welterweight champion Carlos Morocho Hernández by knockout in round eight of a non-title bout, in Wembley on 11 May 1971.

=== Stripping of title ===
He was stripped of the WBC title for failing to defend against Pedro Carrasco on 25 June 1971.

Despite this setback, he remained the WBA world lightweight champion. Then, he flew to New York City to meet Laguna again, this time defending his world title. Buchanan retained the title with another decision over Laguna on 13 September 1971.

His next fights were a couple of non-title affairs, one in London and one in South Africa. The South African fight against Andries Steyn in Johannesburg was a mismatch with his opponent's corner throwing in the towel in the third round on 29 April 1972.

His next defence came on 26 June 1972, against Panama's greatest, the then undefeated Roberto Durán at the Madison Square Garden (MSG) in New York, in a bout which had a highly controversial ending. Durán was ahead on all three cards at the end of the 13th round, when both fighters exchanged punches after the bell. Buchanan went down, writhing in pain from a low blow, that Buchanan's trainer, Gil Clancy, said was caused by a knee to the groin. Referee Johnny LoBianco awarded the fight to Durán, insisting that the blow that took down Buchanan was "in the abdomen, not any lower" and that he felt that Buchanan would be unable to continue fighting.

The New York Times columnist Red Smith wrote that LoBianco had to award the victory to Durán, even if the punch was a low blow, as "anything short of pulling a knife is regarded indulgently" in American boxing.

=== Durán's refusal to honour the contract to face Buchanan ===
In his next fight, Buchanan beat former three-time world champion Carlos Ortiz by a knockout in six, also at Madison Square Garden on 20 September 1972.

Buchanan finished 1972 with a win over Chang Kil Lee on 4 December 1972.

On 28 June 1972, Roberto Durán signed to defend it against Buchanan on 20 October 1972. However, Durán broke that agreement when the Panamanian Government insisted he make his first defence in Panama. He did, knocking out Jimmy Robertson on 20 January 1973.

Durán also had signed a second contract with the MSG on 25 October 1972, to defend against Buchanan on or before 30 June 1973.

Once again Durán broke the agreement, and subsequently had his licence suspended by the New York State Athletic Commission on 4 April 1973. The commission also warned Durán that his title recognition would be withdrawn.

The New York State Athletic Commission had been attempting for two years (1972–1974) to get Durán to honour an agreement to fight Buchanan. But Durán refused to honour the contract.

=== Later career ===
In 1973, Buchanan started out by beating future world lightweight champion Jim Watt by a decision after 15 rounds, to regain the British lightweight title. Soon, he embarked on another international tour that included more fights in the United States, several fights in Denmark, and one fight in Canada. He won each of those fights, leading towards a challenge of European lightweight champion Antonio Puddu in Italy, and Buchanan added the European lightweight championship belt to his shelf by defeating Puddu by a decision in 15 rounds.

He retained the title by beating Tavarez for the third time, this time by a knockout in 14 at Paris, and then he travelled to Japan to fight for the world title again. This time, however, he was defeated by a decision in 15 rounds by the WBC's world champion, Guts Ishimatsu.

Buchanan re-grouped once again, and won in a defence of the European lightweight title against Giancarlo Usai by a knockout in 12. But he retired from 1976 to 1978, leaving the European lightweight title vacant.

When he returned to professional boxing in 1978, he won two straight bouts, but everything else started going backwards for him. Challenging Charlie Nash in Copenhagen, he lost by a decision in twelve. In 1980, he won two bouts in a row, but after that, he lost five bouts in a row, finally retiring for good after losing to George Feeney by a decision in eight on 25 January 1982. In 2000, he was elected to the International Boxing Hall of Fame. In 2002 he was inducted into the Scottish Sport Hall of Fame.

== Death ==
Buchanan died on 1 April 2023, at the age of 77. He had been suffering from dementia.

== Professional boxing record ==
| 69 fights | 61 wins | 8 losses |
|---|---|---|
| By knockout | 27 | 1 |
| By decision | 34 | 7 |

| No. | Result | Record | Opponent | Type | Round | Date | Location | Notes |
|---|---|---|---|---|---|---|---|---|
| 69 | Loss | 61–8 | George Feeney | PTS | 8 | 25 January 1982 | National Sporting Club, Piccadilly | |
| 68 | Loss | 61–7 | Lance Williams | PTS | 8 | 24 November 1981 | Wembley Arena, Wembley | |
| 67 | Loss | 61–6 | Langton Tinago | PTS | 10 | 4 April 1981 | National Sports Centre, Harare (Salisbury) | |
| 66 | Loss | 61–5 | Steve Early | PTS | 12 | 26 January 1981 | Tower Ballroom, Edgbaston, Birmingham | |
| 65 | Win | 61–4 | Des Gwilliam | PTS | 8 | 20 October 1980 | Bingley Hall, Birmingham | |
| 64 | Win | 60–4 | Najib Daho | KO | 7 (10) | 5 May 1980 | World Sporting Club, Mayfair | |
| 63 | Loss | 59–4 | Charlie Nash | UD | 12 | 6 December 1979 | Brondby Hallen, Brondby | For European lightweight title |
| 62 | Win | 59–3 | Eloi De Souza | PTS | 8 | 6 September 1979 | Randers Hallen, Randers | |
| 61 | Win | 58–3 | Benny Benitez | PTS | 8 | 28 June 1979 | Randers Hallen, Randers | |
| 60 | Win | 57–3 | Giancarlo Usai | TKO | 12 (15) | 25 July 1975 | Cagliari Football Stadium, Cagliari | Retained European lightweight title |
| 59 | Loss | 56–3 | Guts Ishimatsu | UD | 15 | 27 February 1975 | Metropolitan Gym | For WBC lightweight title |
| 58 | Win | 56–2 | Leonard Tavarez | TKO | 14 (15) | 16 December 1974 | Parc des Expositions, Paris | Retained European lightweight title |
| 57 | Win | 55–2 | Winston Noel | TKO | 2 (10) | 21 November 1974 | K.B. Hallen, Copenhagen | |
| 56 | Win | 54–2 | Antonio Puddu | TKO | 6 (15) | 1 May 1974 | Cagliari | Won European lightweight title |
| 55 | Win | 53–2 | Joe Tetteh | KO | 3 (10) | 4 April 1974 | K.B. Hallen, Copenhagen | |
| 54 | Win | 52–2 | Jose Peterson | PTS | 10 | 7 February 1974 | K.B. Hallen, Copenhagen | |
| 53 | Win | 51–2 | Miguel Araujo | KO | 1 (10) | 6 December 1973 | K.B. Hallen, Copenhagen | |
| 52 | Win | 50–2 | Frankie Otero | TKO | 6 (10) | 11 October 1973 | Maple Leaf Gardens, Toronto | |
| 51 | Win | 49–2 | Edwin Malave | TKO | 7 (10) | 1 September 1973 | Felt Forum, New York | |
| 50 | Win | 48–2 | Frankie Otero | UD | 10 | 29 May 1973 | Convention Center, Miami Beach | |
| 49 | Win | 47–2 | Hector Matta | PTS | 10 | 27 March 1973 | Royal Albert Hall, Kensington | |
| 48 | Win | 46–2 | Jim Watt | PTS | 15 | 29 January 1973 | Albany Hotel, Glasgow | Won British lightweight title |
| 47 | Win | 45–2 | Chang-Kil Lee | TKO | 2 (10) | 4 December 1972 | Madison Square Garden, New York | |
| 46 | Win | 44–2 | Carlos Ortiz | RTD | 6 (10) | 20 September 1972 | Madison Square Garden, New York | |
| 45 | Loss | 43–2 | Roberto Durán | TKO | 13 (15) | 26 June 1972 | Madison Square Garden, New York | Lost WBA and The Ring lightweight titles |
| 44 | Win | 43–1 | Andries Steyn | RTD | 3 (10) | 29 April 1972 | Rand Stadium, Johannesburg | |
| 43 | Win | 42–1 | Al Ford | PTS | 10 | 28 March 1972 | Empire Pool, Wembley | |
| 42 | Win | 41–1 | Ismael Laguna | UD | 15 | 13 September 1971 | Madison Square Garden, New York | Retained WBA and The Ring lightweight titles |
| 41 | Win | 40–1 | Carlos Morocho Hernández | TKO | 8 (10) | 11 May 1971 | Empire Pool, Wembley | |
| 40 | Win | 39–1 | Ruben Navarro | UD | 15 | 12 February 1971 | Sports Arena, Los Angeles | Retained WBA and The Ring lightweight titles; Won vacant WBC lightweight titles |
| 39 | Win | 38–1 | Donato Paduano | UD | 10 | 7 December 1970 | Madison Square Garden, New York | |
| 38 | Win | 37–1 | Ismael Laguna | SD | 15 | 26 September 1970 | Hiram Bithorn Stadium, San Juan | Won WBA and The Ring lightweight titles; Won vacant NYSAC lightweight title |
| 37 | Win | 36–1 | Brian Hudson | PTS | 10 | 12 May 1970 | Empire Pool, Wembley | Retained British lightweight title |
| 36 | Win | 35–1 | Chris Fernandez | PTS | 10 | 6 April 1970 | Ice Rink, Nottingham | |
| 35 | Win | 34–1 | Leonard Tavarez | PTS | 10 | 23 February 1970 | Cafe Royal, Piccadilly | |
| 34 | Loss | 33–1 | Miguel Velasquez | PTS | 15 | 29 January 1970 | Palacio de los Deportes, Madrid | For vacant European lightweight title |
| 33 | Win | 33–0 | Vincenzo Pitardi | TKO | 2 (10) | 11 November 1969 | Grosvenor House, Mayfair | |
| 32 | Win | 32–0 | Jerry Graci | TKO | 1 (10) | 14 July 1969 | Ice Rink, Nottingham | |
| 31 | Win | 31–0 | Jose Luis Tocida | PTS | 10 | 5 March 1969 | Midlands Sporting Club, Solihull | |
| 30 | Win | 30–0 | Mike Cruz | TKO | 4 (10) | 17 February 1969 | World Sporting Club, Mayfair | |
| 29 | Win | 29–0 | Frankie Narvaez | PTS | 10 | 2 January 1969 | National Sporting Club, Cafe Royal, Piccadilly | |
| 28 | Win | 28–0 | Ameur Lamine | TKO | 3 (10) | 11 December 1968 | Town Hall, Hamilton | |
| 27 | Win | 27–0 | Angel Robinson Garcia | PTS | 10 | 23 October 1968 | Grosvenor House, Mayfair | |
| 26 | Win | 26–0 | Ivan Whiter | PTS | 8 | 10 June 1968 | National Sporting Club, Piccadilly | |
| 25 | Win | 25–0 | Leonard Tavarez | PTS | 8 | 22 April 1968 | National Sporting Club, Piccadilly | |
| 24 | Win | 24–0 | Maurice Cullen | KO | 11 (15) | 19 February 1968 | Hilton Hotel, Mayfair | Won British lightweight title |
| 23 | Win | 23–0 | Jim McCormack | PTS | 12 | 30 October 1967 | National Sporting Club, Piccadilly | |
| 22 | Win | 22–0 | Al Rocca | TKO | 7 (8) | 14 September 1967 | Grosvenor House, Mayfair | |
| 21 | Win | 21–0 | Rene Roque | PTS | 8 | 26 July 1967 | Afan Lido Sports Centre, Aberavon | |
| 20 | Win | 20–0 | Winston Laud | PTS | 8 | 28 June 1967 | National Sporting Club, Piccadilly | |
| 19 | Win | 19–0 | Franco Brondi | TKO | 3 (10) | 11 May 1967 | Ice Rink, Paisley | |
| 18 | Win | 18–0 | Tommy Garrison | PTS | 10 | 14 February 1967 | Royal Albert Hall, Kensington | |
| 17 | Win | 17–0 | John McMillan | PTS | 10 | 23 January 1967 | Central Hotel, Glasgow | |
| 16 | Win | 16–0 | Phil Lundgren | PTS | 10 | 19 December 1966 | National Sporting Club, Piccadilly | |
| 15 | Win | 15–0 | Al Keen | PTS | 8 | 17 October 1966 | Town Hall, Leeds | |
| 14 | Win | 14–0 | Antonio Paiva | PTS | 10 | 17 October 1966 | National Sporting Club, Piccadilly | |
| 13 | Win | 13–0 | Mickey Laud | PTS | 8 | 8 September 1966 | Empire Pool, Wembley | |
| 12 | Win | 12–0 | Ivan Whiter | PTS | 8 | 8 August 1966 | Earls Court Arena, Kensington | |
| 11 | Win | 11–0 | Brian Smyth | TKO | 1 (8) | 12 July 1966 | Afan Lido Sports Centre, Aberavon | |
| 10 | Win | 10–0 | Junior Cassidy | PTS | 8 | 11 May 1966 | Wyvern Sporting Club (Midland Hotel), Manchester | |
| 9 | Win | 9–0 | Chris Elliott | PTS | 8 | 19 April 1966 | National Sporting Club, Piccadilly | |
| 8 | Win | 8–0 | Tommy Tiger | PTS | 8 | 4 April 1966 | National Sporting Club, Piccadilly | |
| 7 | Win | 7–0 | Manley Brown | TKO | 4 (8) | 7 March 1966 | National Sporting Club, Piccadilly | |
| 6 | Win | 6–0 | Tommy Tiger | PTS | 8 | 24 January 1966 | National Sporting Club, Piccadilly | |
| 5 | Win | 5–0 | Junior Cassidy | PTS | 8 | 13 December 1965 | National Sporting Club, Piccadilly | |
| 4 | Win | 4–0 | Joe Okezie | TKO | 3 (8) | 22 November 1965 | National Sporting Club, Piccadilly | |
| 3 | Win | 3–0 | Billy Williams | TKO | 3 (6) | 1 November 1965 | National Sporting Club, Piccadilly | |
| 2 | Win | 2–0 | Vic Woodhall | TKO | 2 (6) | 18 October 1965 | Wyvern Sporting Club (Midland Hotel), Manchester | |
| 1 | Win | 1–0 | Brian Rocky Tonks | TKO | 2 (6) | 20 September 1965 | National Sporting Club, Piccadilly | |

== Titles in boxing ==
=== Major world titles ===
- NYSAC lightweight champion (135 lbs)
- WBA lightweight champion (135 lbs)
- WBC lightweight champion (135 lbs)

=== The Ring magazine titles ===
- The Ring lightweight champion (135 lbs)

=== Regional/International titles ===
- British lightweight champion (135 lbs) (2×)
- European lightweight champion (135 lbs)

=== Undisputed titles ===
- Undisputed lightweight champion

== Statue ==
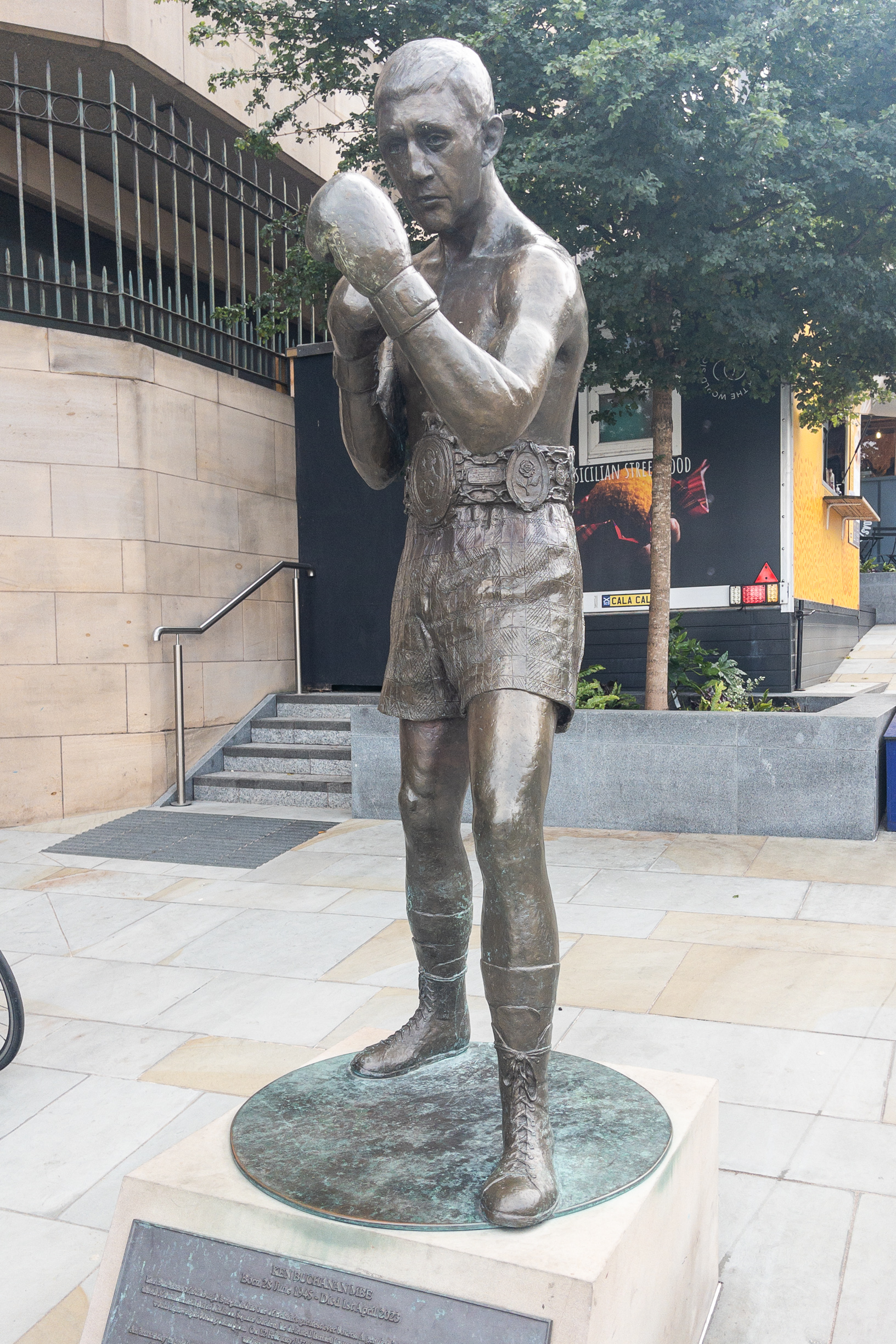
Statue of Ken Buchanan

On 14 August 2022, a statue of Ken Buchanan was unveiled on Little King Street, Edinburgh. It is located near the St James Quarter, at the top of Leith Walk. Buchanan attended the unveiling, along with many fans. It was created by Scottish sculptor Alan Herriot, and cast at Powderhall Bronze.

== See also ==
- Lineal championship
- List of world lightweight boxing champions
- List of British world boxing champions

Sporting positions
Regional boxing titles
| Preceded by Maurice Cullen | British lightweight champion 19 February 1968 – 1971; Vacated | Vacant Title next held by Willie Reilly |
| Preceded by Jim Watt | British lightweight champion 29 January 1973 – 1973; Vacated | Vacant Title next held by Jim Watt |
| Preceded by Antonio Puddu | European lightweight champion 1 May 1974 – 1976; Vacated | Vacant Title next held by Fernand Roelands |
World boxing titles
| Preceded by Ismael Laguna | WBA lightweight champion 26 September 1970 – 26 June 1972 | Succeeded by Roberto Durán |
| Preceded by Ismael Laguna | The Ring lightweight champion 26 September 1970 – 26 June 1972 | Succeeded by Roberto Durán |
| Vacant Title last held by Ismael Laguna | WBC lightweight champion 12 February 1971 – 25 June 1971; Stripped | Vacant Title next held by Pedro Carrasco |
| Vacant Title last held by Ismael Laguna | Undisputed lightweight champion 12 February 1971 – 25 June 1971; Titles fragmented | Vacant Title next held by Roberto Durán |
Records
| Previous: Terry Downes | Oldest Living British World Champion; 6 October 2017 – 1 April 2023 | Next: Jim Watt |
