= Maurice Cullen =

Maurice Cullen may refer to:

- Maurice Cullen (boxer) (1937–2001), English lightweight boxer
- Maurice Cullen (artist) (1866–1934), Canadian artist
