= Chango Carmona =

Mexican boxer

Personal information
- Nickname: Erubey
- Born: Eudibiel Guillen Chapin; September 29, 1944 (age 81) Mexico City, Mexico
- Height: 5 ft 8 in (173 cm)
- Weight: Lightweight

Boxing career
- Stance: Orthodox

Boxing record
- Total fights: 68
- Wins: 53
- Win by KO: 43
- Losses: 13
- Draws: 2

Eudibiel Guillen Chapin, better known as Chango Carmona is a Mexican former professional boxer who won the WBC lightweight title in 1972.

== Professional career ==
Carmona is believed to be the boxer who began the tradition of having a big fight on the Mexico Independence Day holiday weekend when he stopped Mando Ramos in the eighth round to win the lightweight title in Los Angeles on Sept. 15, 1972.

Chango lost a combined 4 fights to two fighters. He lost to Arturo Morales in back to back fights in 1965 and 1966, and he lost to Alfredo El Canelo Urbina back to back in 1967. He lost the WBC Lightweight title to Rodolfo González in 1972 at the Sports arena in Los Angeles.

== Professional boxing record ==
68 fights	53 wins	13 losses
By knockout	43	5
By decision	10	8
Draws	2	

No.	Result	Record	Opponent	Type	Round, time	Date	Location	Notes
68	Win	53–13–2	Francisco Candela	KO	2 (10)	1979-12-20	Acapulco, Mexico	
67	Win	52–13–2	Moy Mendez	TKO	2 (10)	1975-03-01	Ciudad Juárez, Mexico	
66	Win	51–13–2	Merced Soria	KO	2 (10)	1975-01-01	Mexico City, Mexico	
65	Loss	50–13–2	Shinichi Kadota	KO	7 (10)	1973-07-31	Honolulu International Center, Honolulu, Hawaii, U.S.	
64	Loss	50–12–2	Jimmy Heair	UD	10 (10)	1973-03-17	Sports Arena, Los Angeles, California, U.S.	
63	Loss	50–11–2	Rodolfo González	RTD	12 (15)	1972-11-10	Sports Arena, Los Angeles, California, U.S.	Lost WBC lightweight title
62	Win	50–10–2	Mando Ramos	TKO	8 (15)	1972-09-15	Memorial Coliseum, Los Angeles, California, U.S.	Won WBC lightweight title
61	Win	49–10–2	Jimmy Robertson	TKO	8 (12)	1972-07-06	Olympic Auditorium, Los Angeles, California, U.S.	Won NABF lightweight title
60	Win	48–10–2	Masataka Takayama	TKO	3 (10)	1972-05-18	Olympic Auditorium, Los Angeles, California, U.S.	
59	Win	47–10–2	Raimundo Dias	RTD	7 (10)	1972-04-04	Plaza de Toros El Toreo, Tijuana, Mexico	
58	Win	46–10–2	Eduardo Moreno	TKO	7 (12)	1972-02-12	Arena México, Mexico City, Mexico	Retained Mexican lightweight title
57	Loss	45–10–2	Raimundo Dias	TKO	5 (10)	1971-08-31	Plaza de Toros, Ciudad Juárez, Mexico	
56	Win	45–9–2	Ismael Rivera	KO	4 (10)	1971-08-06	Acapulco, Mexico	
55	Win	44–9–2	Antonio Amaya	TKO	7 (10)	1971-06-19	Monterrey, Mexico	
54	Loss	43–9–2	Ismael Laguna	UD	10 (10)	1971-04-03	Gimnasio Nuevo Panama, Panama City, Panama	
53	Win	43–8–2	Fermin Soto	PTS	12 (12)	1971-02-13	Arena México, Mexico City, Mexico	Retained Mexican lightweight title
52	Win	42–8–2	Gerardo Ferrat	KO	3 (10)	1971-01-10	Mexico City, Mexico	
51	Win	41–8–2	Arturo Lomeli	TKO	8 (12)	1970-11-17	Palacio Jai Alai, Tijuana, Mexico	Won Mexican lightweight title
50	Win	40–8–2	Jaguar Kakizawa	KO	10 (10)	1970-10-10	Mexico City, Mexico	
49	Win	39–8–2	Fermin Soto	TKO	9 (10)	1970-08-22	Mexico City, Mexico	
48	Win	38–8–2	Ray Adigun	TKO	7 (10)	1970-07-13	Tijuana, Mexico	
47	Win	37–8–2	Orlando Ribeiro	TKO	4 (10)	1970-04-11	Arena México, Mexico City, Mexico	
46	Win	36–8–2	Jose Angel Herrera	KO	5 (10)	1970-03-22	Plaza de Toros Monumental, Monterrey, Mexico	
45	Loss	35–8–2	Sugar Ramos	TKO	7 (10)	1969-09-29	Plaza de Toros El Toreo, Tijuana, Mexico	
44	Win	35–7–2	Doug Agin	KO	2 (10)	1969-09-09	Municipal Auditorium, San Antonio, Texas, U.S.	
43	Win	34–7–2	Lupe Ramirez	PTS	10 (10)	1969-08-10	Mexico City, Mexico	
42	Win	33–7–2	Alfonso Frazer	TKO	3 (10)	1969-07-26	Arena México, Mexico City, Mexico	
41	Draw	32–7–2	Genaro Soto	SD	10 (10)	1969-06-20	Municipal Auditorium, San Antonio, Texas, U.S.	
40	Win	32–7–1	Roman Blanco	KO	8 (10)	1969-05-19	Sports Arena, San Diego, California, U.S.	
39	Loss	31–7–1	Frankie Narvaez	MD	10 (10)	1969-03-21	HemisFair Arena, San Antonio, Texas, U.S.	
38	Win	31–6–1	Juan Escobar	TKO	5 (10)	1969-03-07	Acapulco, Mexico	
37	Loss	30–6–1	Hugo Rambaldi	KO	1 (10)	1968-12-21	Arena México, Mexico City, Mexico	
36	Win	30–5–1	Percy Hayles	RTD	4 (10)	1968-11-13	HemisFair Arena, San Antonio, Texas, U.S.	
35	Win	29–5–1	Norio Endo	TKO	2 (10)	1968-09-21	Arena México, Mexico City, Mexico	
34	Win	28–5–1	Renaldo Victoria	KO	3 (10)	1968-08-10	Arena México, Mexico City, Mexico	
33	Win	27–5–1	Joe Brown	TKO	4 (10)	1968-06-08	Arena México, Mexico City, Mexico	
32	Win	26–5–1	Norberto Landa	TKO	5 (10)	1968-04-01	Xalapa, Mexico	
31	Win	25–5–1	Javier Ayala	KO	3 (10)	1968-02-24	Mexico City, Mexico	
30	Loss	24–5–1	Alfredo Urbina	PTS	12 (12)	1967-10-21	Mexico City, Mexico	Lost Mexican lightweight title
29	Win	24–4–1	Arturo Lomeli	PTS	12 (12)	1967-09-04	Tijuana, Mexico	Won vacant Mexican lightweight title
28	Win	23–4–1	Chucho Garcia	PTS	10 (10)	1967-07-01	Mexico City, Mexico	
27	Loss	22–4–1	Alfredo Urbina	PTS	10 (10)	1967-05-06	Mexico City, Mexico	
26	Win	22–3–1	Baby Vasquez	PTS	10 (10)	1967-03-11	Arena México, Mexico City, Mexico	
25	Win	21–3–1	Eduardo Moreno	TKO	4 (10)	1967-02-11	Mexico City, Mexico	
24	Win	20–3–1	Roberto Gomez	KO	3 (10)	1966-11-05	Mexico City, Mexico	
23	Win	19–3–1	Juan Ortiz	TKO	5 (10)	1966-10-17	Mexico City, Mexico	
22	Win	18–3–1	Lupe Ramirez	PTS	10 (10)	1966-08-10	Mexico City, Mexico	
21	Win	17–3–1	Battling Kid	KO	5 (10)	1966-07-06	León, Mexico	
20	Win	16–3–1	Nicolas Sanchez	KO	6 (10)	1966-06-15	Mexico City, Mexico	
19	Win	15–3–1	Marcos Gomez	TKO	5 (10)	1966-03-19	Arena Coliseo, Guadalajara, Mexico	
18	Win	14–3–1	Jorge Díaz	PTS	10 (10)	1966-03-11	Querétaro, Mexico	
17	Loss	13–3–1	Arturo Morales	PTS	10 (10)	1966-01-26	Mexico City, Mexico	
16	Loss	13–2–1	Arturo Morales	PTS	10 (10)	1965-10-23	Mexico City, Mexico	
15	Win	13–1–1	Manuel Andrade	KO	5 (10)	1965-08-28	Arena México, Mexico City, Mexico	
14	Win	12–1–1	Jorge Jimenez	TKO	8 (10)	1965-07-24	Arena México, Mexico City, Mexico	
13	Draw	11–1–1	Rogelio Reyes	PTS	10 (10)	1965-05-04	Auditorio Municipal, Ciudad Juárez, Mexico	
12	Win	11–1	Lupe Ramirez	PTS	8 (8)	1965-04-17	Arena Coliseo, Mexico City, Mexico	
11	Win	10–1	Moy Mendez	KO	2 (8)	1965-03-16	Auditorio Municipal, Ciudad Juárez, Mexico	
10	Win	9–1	Gustavo Garcia	KO	5 (10)	1965-02-03	Mexico City, Mexico	
9	Win	8–1	Merced Soria	TKO	2 (6)	1965-01-09	Mexico City, Mexico	
8	Win	7–1	Joaquin Velazquez	KO	6 (10)	1964-11-11	Mexico City, Mexico	
7	Win	6–1	Gustavo Garcia	KO	8 (10)	1964-10-24	Oaxaca City, Mexico	
6	Loss	5–1	Jorge Jimenez	PTS	8 (8)	1964-10-07	Mexico City, Mexico	
5	Win	5–0	Jesus Gonzalez	TKO	2 (8)	1964-09-19	Mexico City, Mexico	
4	Win	4–0	Kid Chocolate II	KO	6 (8)	1964-08-15	Acapulco, Mexico	
3	Win	3–0	Arturo Islas	PTS	6 (6)	1964-08-01	Mexico City, Mexico	
2	Win	2–0	Joel Osorio	KO	2 (6)	1964-04-22	Mexico City, Mexico	
1	Win	1–0	Tony Lopez	PTS	6 (6)	1964-01-18	Monterrey, Mexico	

== Later life ==
He now has 7 grandchildren. two from each of his daughters and one from his son. Mitzy Munoz and Cindy Munoz from his daughter Dianey.

== See also ==
- WBC Legends of Boxing Museum
- List of Mexican boxing world champions
- List of world lightweight boxing champions

Sporting positions
Regional boxing titles
Vacant Title last held by Raúl Rodríguez	Mexican lightweight champion September 4, 1967 – October 21, 1967	Succeeded by Alfredo Urbina
Preceded by Arturo Lomeli	Mexican lightweight champion November 17, 1970 – July 6, 1972; Won NABF title	Vacant Title next held by Leoncio Ortiz
Preceded by Jimmy Robertson	NABF lightweight champion July 6, 1972 – September 15, 1972; Won world title	Vacant Title next held by Esteban de Jesús
World boxing titles
Preceded by Mando Ramos	WBC lightweight champion September 15, 1972 – November 10, 1972	Succeeded by Rodolfo González
