= Guts Ishimatsu =

Japanese boxer and media personality (1949–2026)

- ガッツ 石松
- Born: Yuji Suzuki; 5 June 1949; Awano, Tochigi Prefecture, Japan (now in Kanuma)
- Died: 2 June 2026 (aged 76); Tokyo, Japan
- Occupations: Actor, comedian, spokesperson, boxing commentator
- Boxing career
- Nicknames: Guts; Ishimatsu Suzuki
- Height: 171 cm (5 ft 7 in)
- Weight: Lightweight
- Reach: 172 cm (68 in)
- Stance: Orthodox

Boxing record
- Total fights: 51
- Wins: 31
- Win by KO: 17
- Losses: 14
- Draws: 6
- No contests: 0

Yuji Suzuki (鈴木 有二, Suzuki Yūji; 5 June 1949 – 2 June 2026), better known as Guts Ishimatsu (ガッツ 石松, Gattsu Ishimatsu) was a Japanese actor, comedian, tarento and professional boxer who competed in the Lightweight division from 1966 to 1978. He was a one-time former WBC Lightweight Champion and an OPBF Lightweight Champion.

As a boxer, he was known for his unpredictable style, sometimes marking completely unexpected victories, and often losing in extravagant fashion as well. He lost 14 of his 51 professional fights, a rather large number of losses for a world champion. Since retiring in the late 1970s, he had gained popularity as an entertainer.

Guts often appeared as a foolish boke character on television, but this was an act he put on for media purposes. As a boxing commentator, he offered precise, intelligent commentary based on his own experiences in the ring.

== Early life ==
Born Yuji Suzuki in Awano, Tochigi Prefecture (now incorporated into Kanuma) in 1949, he originally intended to be a physical education teacher, but his family's financial circumstances prevented him from pursuing higher education, leading him to move to Tokyo, where he began training in boxing while working several odd jobs.

== Boxing career ==
Guts made his professional debut in 1966. He was known primarily as a rough, undisciplined fighter early in his career, but his technique improved greatly under the tutelage of American trainer Eddie Townsend. His original ring name was Ishimatsu Suzuki, but was changed to Guts Ishimatsu, since he wanted himself to become a gutsy boxer. Earlier in his career, Guts had often given up in fights where he was losing.

He challenged Panamanian Ismael Laguna in 1970 for the WBA/WBC Lightweight Title, but lost by TKO in the 13th round. He challenged Shinichi Kadota (who had knocked out Guts only five months earlier) in 1972, and won by decision to capture the OPBF Lightweight title. After the fight, he remarked that his goal was to fight the WBA/WBC champion Ken Buchanan. Buchanan would challenge Guts three years later, when Guts was the WBC Lightweight champion.

In 1973, Guts challenged the legendary Roberto Durán in Panama for the WBA Lightweight title. Guts fought hard, but was brutally knocked out in the 10th round. Guts' manager was infuriated by Guts' loser attitude, as Guts remarked that Durán in his prime was "Too strong, I can't win", even before the fight had ended.

On 11 April 1974, Guts fought WBC Champion Rodolfo Gato González in Tokyo. González had a record of 59-5-0 (50KOs) going into the fight, as opposed to Guts' rather pathetic record of 26-11-6 (14KOs). Few expected Guts to win, but Guts fought toe-to-toe with the champion, getting a knockout win in the 8th round. Guts credited his win with being able to prepare for three extra months (González was bitten by a spider before the fight, moving the date back three months), which he used to pack on extra stamina for the fight. Guts was re-introduced to González 32 years later on a Japanese television show, where he learned that he and Gonzalez bore an uncanny number of similarities, including being born in a poor household, and succeeding as an actor after retiring from boxing as former world champions.

Guts made his first title defense in September 1974, and beat González again in November 1974 for his second title defense. The next challenger was Scotsman Ken Buchanan, who was 56-2-0 (25KOs) and had not lost in the last three years. The fight was scheduled for February 1975. Buchanan led the early and middle rounds by points, but Guts fought back in the later rounds, swinging his arms around almost blindly to slow Buchanan's pace. The fight ended lopsidedly, with Guts slugging Buchanan for the last three rounds. All three judges awarded Guts the win.

He made his fourth defense in June 1975, but he gradually realized that it was becoming harder and harder for him to maintain his weight in the Lightweight division. For his fifth defense in December 1975, Guts had to lower his weight 19 kg from his natural weight, losing 10 kg in the month before the fight. Guts lost his title in May 1976 to Esteban De Jesús by 15 round decision. The fight took place in Puerto Rico, and the country paid $200,000 (a rather large investment in the time period for a lightweight title match) to have Guts fight in Puerto Rico, showing Guts' widespread popularity at the time.

Guts moved up to Junior Welterweight (current Super Lightweight/Light Welterweight) in 1977, challenging Saensak Muangsurin, but was knocked out in the 6th round. Despite having moved up a weight class, Guts still had to shed 15 kg off his natural weight to make the weight-in. Guts retired after losing again in a non-title match on 20 June 1978. His record was 31-14-6 (17KOs).

== Post-retirement ==
Guts had begun to appear on television shows even before his boxing career had ended. He appeared on a variety show for the first time in 1974, only the day after he had become the WBC lightweight world champion. Guts became indispensable to quiz shows and game shows, where he would make the meaningless answer "OK Boku-jo" ("OK Corral") regardless of what the trivia question was actually asking. However, in certain shows, he recorded rather high scores, surprising viewers with his intelligent side. "OK Boku-jo" became the word of the year in Japan (2004), and Ishimatsu released a single CD, as well as a book describing his experiences inside and outside the ring, which became a best-seller. "OK Boku-jo" and its other variations (such as "OK No-jo", which is meant to give a negative connotation) have become immensely popular (but still completely meaningless) in Japan.

== The Guts Pose ==
Guts is credited with coining the word "Guts Pose" (ガッツポーズ, gattsu pōzu), now commonly used in the Japanese language. The word comes from the peculiar pose he struck after winning fights, where he would pump his fist up and down in the air. He has explained that his right hand shows his own joy at winning the fight, and his left hand shows his gratitude to the crowd. Japanese pitchers are often seen striking this pose after finishing a game/inning, or striking out a batter.

== Acting ==
Guts appeared in several films, both inside and outside Japan. Notables include Steven Spielberg's Empire of the Sun (1987) and Ridley Scott's Black Rain (1989). He said the only reason he started acting was so that he could be on the screen with Ken Takakura, who was his childhood idol. He has also appeared in numerous television dramas, and has occasionally attempted to write and direct films of his own.

== Death ==
On 11 June 2026, Guts Enterprise, Ishimatsu's management office announced that he died of pneumonia at a hospital in Tokyo, on 2 June, at the age of 76.

Guts has a large grave already built in the Satsuki Reien cemetery in Kanuma, Tochigi.

== See also ==
- List of WBC world champions
- List of Japanese boxing world champions
- Boxing in Japan

Achievements
Preceded by Rodolfo Gato González	WBC Lightweight Champion; 11 April 1974 – 8 May 1976	Succeeded by Esteban De Jesús
