= Rodolfo González (boxer) =

Mexican boxer (born 1945)

Personal information
- Born: 16 December 1945 (age 80) Guadalajara, Jalisco, Mexico
- Height: 5 ft 9 in (175 cm)
- Weight: Lightweight

Boxing career
- Reach: 70 in (178 cm)
- Stance: Orthodox

Boxing record
- Total fights: 89
- Wins: 80
- Win by KO: 66
- Losses: 8
- Draws: 1

Rodolfo González (born 16 December 1945) is a Mexican former professional boxer who competed from 1959 to 1974. He held the WBC lightweight title from 1972 to 1974.

== Professional career ==
González started his career very young at the age of 14, and won his first 37 bouts. On November 10, 1972, he took on Chango Carmona for the WBC Lightweight Title and won via a Corner retirement in the 13th round. González defended the title two times before losing the belt to Guts Ishimatsu on April 11, 1974, via KO in the 8 round. Later in the year he rematched Ishimatsu, but lost via TKO and retired from boxing. González was a devastating puncher and was named to Ring Magazine's list of 100 greatest punchers, and had a career record of 80-8-1 with 66 ko's.

González actually missed making it into the World Boxing Hall of Fame by one vote in 2003, of the 140 voting members. A private vote was then taken by the 10-member Executive Committee, and González was accepted by an 8-2 vote. Two members resigned in protest, and later that year many more Executive Committee members had dropped out.

== Professional boxing record ==
89 fights	80 wins	8 losses
By knockout	66	5
By decision	14	3
By disqualification	0	0
Draws	1	

No.	Result	Record	Opponent	Type	Round, time	Date	Location	Notes
89	Loss	80–8–1	Guts Ishimatsu	KO	12 (15)	1974-11-28	Prefectural Gymnasium, Osaka, Japan	For WBC lightweight title
88	Win	80–7–1	Clemente Mucino	TD	2 (10)	1974-08-26	Arena Tijuana 72, Tijuana, Mexico	
87	Loss	79–7–1	Guts Ishimatsu	KO	8 (15)	1974-04-11	Nihon University Auditorium, Tokyo, Japan	Lost WBC lightweight title
86	Win	79–6–1	Antonio Puddu	TKO	10 (15)	1973-10-27	Sports Arena, Los Angeles, California, U.S.	Retained WBC lightweight title
85	Win	78–6–1	Don Sennett	TKO	3 (10)	1973-08-30	Olympic Auditorium, Los Angeles, California, U.S.	
84	Win	77–6–1	Ruben Navarro	TKO	9 (15)	1973-03-17	Sports Arena, Los Angeles, California, U.S.	Retained WBC lightweight title
83	Win	76–6–1	José Acosta	KO	1 (10)	1972-12-16	Plaza de Toros Monumental, Monterrey, Mexico	
82	Win	75–6–1	Chango Carmona	RTD	12 (15)	1972-11-10	Sports Arena, Los Angeles, California, U.S.	Won WBC lightweight title
81	Win	74–6–1	Ruben Navarro	MD	10 (10)	1972-07-31	Convention Center, Anaheim, California, U.S.	
80	Win	73–6–1	Jimmy Robertson	UD	10 (10)	1972-04-27	Olympic Auditorium, Los Angeles, California, U.S.	
79	Win	72–6–1	Chun Kyo Shin	TKO	7 (10)	1972-03-16	Olympic Auditorium, Los Angeles, California, U.S.	
78	Win	71–6–1	Manuel Leal	TKO	7 (10)	1972-02-24	Olympic Auditorium, Los Angeles, California, U.S.	
77	Win	70–6–1	Nick Aghai	UD	10 (10)	1971-12-11	Municipal Auditorium, Long Beach, California, U.S.	
76	Win	69–6–1	Juan Collado	MD	10 (10)	1971-10-02	Devonshire Downs, Northridge, California, U.S.	
75	Win	68–6–1	Beto Gonzalez	UD	10 (10)	1971-06-02	Memorial Auditorium, Sacramento, California, U.S.	
74	Win	67–6–1	Ernesto Villaflor	KO	2 (10)	1971-04-26	Honolulu International Center, Honolulu, Hawaii, U.S.	
73	Loss	66–6–1	Antonio Cervantes	TKO	8 (10)	1970-12-17	Olympic Auditorium, Los Angeles, California, U.S.	
72	Win	66–5–1	Fermin Soto	RTD	7 (10)	1970-05-07	Olympic Auditorium, Los Angeles, California, U.S.	
71	Win	65–5–1	Javier Jimenez	TKO	6 (10)	1969-11-11	Municipal Auditorium, San Antonio, Texas, U.S.	
70	Win	64–5–1	Steve Freeman	TKO	5 (10)	1969-08-28	Olympic Auditorium, Los Angeles, California, U.S.	
69	Win	63–5–1	Julio Viera	KO	2 (10)	1969-07-03	Olympic Auditorium, Los Angeles, California, U.S.	
68	Win	62–5–1	Juan Collado	TKO	9 (10)	1969-05-15	Olympic Auditorium, Los Angeles, California, U.S.	
67	Win	61–5–1	Pete Gonzalez	TKO	4 (10)	1969-04-17	Olympic Auditorium, Los Angeles, California, U.S.	
66	Win	60–5–1	Rene Macias	TKO	9 (10)	1968-12-19	Olympic Auditorium, Los Angeles, California, U.S.	
65	Win	59–5–1	Ray Adigun	TKO	10 (10)	1968-10-03	Olympic Auditorium, Los Angeles, California, U.S.	
64	Win	58–5–1	Claudio Adame	KO	7 (10)	1967-07-19	Municipal Auditorium, Long Beach, California, U.S.	
63	Win	57–5–1	Ramon Sarmiento	KO	1 (10)	1967-05-10	Municipal Auditorium, Long Beach, California, U.S.	
62	Win	56–5–1	Marcello Cid	KO	4 (10)	1967-02-09	Olympic Auditorium, Los Angeles, California, U.S.	
61	Win	55–5–1	Daniel Valdez	UD	10 (10)	1966-11-10	Olympic Auditorium, Los Angeles, California, U.S.	
60	Loss	54–5–1	Alton Colter	UD	10 (10)	1966-10-13	Fremont Hotel and Casino, Las Vegas, Nevada, U.S.	
59	Win	54–4–1	Ray Coleman	TKO	4 (8)	1966-09-01	Fremont Hotel and Casino, Las Vegas, Nevada, U.S.	
58	Win	53–4–1	Raul Carreon	UD	8 (8)	1966-08-11	Fremont Hotel and Casino, Las Vegas, Nevada, U.S.	
57	Win	52–4–1	Ray Coleman	UD	6 (6)	1966-07-07	Fremont Hotel and Casino, Las Vegas, Nevada, U.S.	
56	Loss	51–4–1	Bobby Valdez	KO	9 (10)	1966-05-20	Arena, San Bernardino, California, U.S.	
55	Draw	51–3–1	Bobby Valdez	TD	1 (6)	1965-12-02	Olympic Auditorium, Los Angeles, California, U.S.	
54	Loss	51–3	Bobby Valdez	PTS	5 (5)	1965-11-18	Olympic Auditorium, Los Angeles, California, U.S.	
53	Loss	51–2	Licho Guerrero	TKO	10 (10)	1963-02-15	Olympic Auditorium, Los Angeles, California, U.S.	
52	Win	51–1	Babe Lopez	KO	3 (10)	1962-09-01	Arena Coliseo, Guadalajara, Mexico	
51	Win	50–1	Javier Garcia	KO	1 (?)	1962-07-27	Atotonilco el Alto, Mexico	
50	Win	49–1	Alfredo Sanchez	PTS	8 (8)	1962-07-14	Arena Coliseo, Guadalajara, Mexico	
49	Win	48–1	Evaristo Perez	KO	3 (8)	1962-06-23	Arena Coliseo, Guadalajara, Mexico	
48	Win	47–1	Ramon Gutierrez	KO	1 (?)	1962-06-19	Mazatlan, Mexico	
47	Win	46–1	Antonio Luna	PTS	8 (8)	1962-06-02	Arena Coliseo, Guadalajara, Mexico	
46	Win	45–1	Babe Lopez	PTS	8 (8)	1962-05-12	Arena Coliseo, Guadalajara, Mexico	
45	Win	44–1	Agustin Campos	TKO	9 (?)	1962-05-09	Mazatlan, Mexico	
44	Win	43–1	Evaristo Perez	PTS	8 (8)	1962-03-17	Arena Coliseo, Guadalajara, Mexico	
43	Win	42–1	Generalito Nunez	KO	4 (?)	1962-02-19	Ixtlán de los Hervores, Mexico	
42	Win	41–1	Jose Perez	KO	1 (?)	1962-01-20	Jiquilpan, Mexico	
41	Win	40–1	Ruben Ramirez	KO	3 (8)	1961-12-30	Arena Coliseo, Guadalajara, Mexico	
40	Win	39–1	Jose Luis Lopez	KO	2 (?)	1961-11-14	Jiquilpan, Mexico	
39	Win	38–1	Ramon Caviedes	KO	9 (?)	1961-10-18	Atotonilco el Alto, Mexico	
38	Loss	37–1	Jose Luis Castillo	PTS	8 (8)	1961-10-03	Arena Coliseo, Guadalajara, Mexico	
37	Win	37–0	Paco Gomez	TKO	10 (?)	1961-09-17	Mazatlan, Mexico	
36	Win	36–0	Maximo Rivera	TKO	4 (6)	1961-09-09	Arena Coliseo, Guadalajara, Mexico	
35	Win	35–0	Jose Estrada	KO	1 (?)	1961-08-28	Tepic, Mexico	
34	Win	34–0	Salvador Banuelos	PTS	6 (6)	1961-08-19	Arena Coliseo, Guadalajara, Mexico	
33	Win	33–0	El Chapo Lopez	KO	4 (?)	1961-08-14	Tepic, Mexico	
32	Win	32–0	Vaquero Montoya	TKO	6 (6)	1961-07-22	Arena Coliseo, Guadalajara, Mexico	
31	Win	31–0	El Pecas Garcia	KO	2 (?)	1961-06-07	Atemajac, Mexico	
30	Win	30–0	Jose Rojas	KO	1 (?)	1961-04-03	Atotonilco el Alto, Mexico	
29	Win	29–0	Felipe Sanchez	KO	2 (?)	1961-03-02	San Miguel, Mexico	
28	Win	28–0	Guadalupe Vargas	KO	3 (?)	1961-02-14	Guadalajara, Mexico	
27	Win	27–0	Jesus Sanchez	KO	3 (?)	1961-01-29	Ixtlán de los Hervores, Mexico	
26	Win	26–0	Rosendo Fernandez	KO	1 (?)	1961-01-12	Yurécuaro, Mexico	
25	Win	25–0	Topo Garcia	KO	1 (?)	1960-11-16	Tequila, Mexico	
24	Win	24–0	Gregorio Lopez	KO	2 (?)	1960-10-30	Guadalajara, Mexico	
23	Win	23–0	Jose Rodriguez	KO	3 (?)	1960-10-06	Tequila, Mexico	
22	Win	22–0	Kid Irapuato	KO	6 (10)	1960-09-14	Yurécuaro, Mexico	
21	Win	21–0	Serafin Garcia	KO	4 (4)	1960-08-28	Jiquilpan, Mexico	
20	Win	20–0	Torito Lopez	KO	4 (?)	1960-08-10	Jiquilpan, Mexico	
19	Win	19–0	Jose Vargas	KO	1 (?)	1960-07-17	Atotonilco el Alto, Mexico	
18	Win	18–0	Roberto Nuno	KO	3 (?)	1960-06-24	Guadalajara, Mexico	
17	Win	17–0	Gregorio Garcia	KO	1 (?)	1960-05-30	Tepic, Mexico	
16	Win	16–0	Tony Rodriguez	KO	4 (?)	1960-05-19	Guadalajara, Mexico	
15	Win	15–0	Saul Pacheco	KO	2 (?)	1960-05-05	Ixtlán de los Hervores, Mexico	
14	Win	14–0	Vicente Ruiz	KO	3 (?)	1960-04-28	Jiquilpan, Mexico	
13	Win	13–0	Roberto Nuno	KO	2 (?)	1960-04-17	Guadalajara, Mexico	
12	Win	12–0	Jose Munos	KO	2 (?)	1960-03-27	Atemajac, Mexico	
11	Win	11–0	David Rodriguez	KO	3 (?)	1960-03-14	Jiquilpan, Mexico	
10	Win	10–0	Javier Garcia	KO	1 (?)	1960-03-06	Jiquilpan, Mexico	
9	Win	9–0	Antonio Luna	KO	6 (?)	1960-02-28	Atemajac, Mexico	
8	Win	8–0	Juan Arias	KO	1 (?)	1960-02-18	Guanajuato, Mexico	
7	Win	7–0	Jose Garcia	KO	1 (?)	1960-02-04	Jiquilpan, Mexico	
6	Win	6–0	Roberto Aguilar	KO	2 (?)	1960-01-18	Atotonilco el Alto, Mexico	
5	Win	5–0	Miguel Lopez	KO	3 (?)	1960-01-03	Jiquilpan, Mexico	
4	Win	4–0	Raul Acevez	KO	3 (?)	1959-12-14	Yurécuaro, Mexico	
3	Win	3–0	Delfino Garcia	KO	2 (?)	1959-11-28	Atemajac, Mexico	
2	Win	2–0	Albino Sanchez	KO	1 (?)	1959-11-17	Atotonilco el Alto, Mexico	
1	Win	1–0	Javier Garcia	KO	1 (?)	1959-11-02	Atotonilco el Alto, Mexico	

== See also ==
- List of Mexican boxing world champions
- List of world lightweight boxing champions

Sporting positions
World boxing titles
Preceded by Chango Carmona	WBC lightweight champion November 10, 1971 – April 11, 1974	Succeeded by Guts Ishimatsu
