= Carlos Cruz (boxer) =

Dominican Republic boxer

Personal information
- Nationality: Dominican
- Born: Carlos Teófilo del Rosario Cruz; November 24, 1937 Santiago de los Caballeros, Dominican Republic
- Died: February 15, 1970 (aged 32) Caribbean Sea
- Height: 5 ft 6 1/2 in (169 cm)
- Weight: Lightweight

Boxing career
- Reach: 68 in (173 cm)
- Stance: Orthodox

Boxing record
- Total fights: 57
- Wins: 42
- Win by KO: 14
- Losses: 13
- Draws: 2

Carlos Teo Rosario Cruz (November 4, 1937 – February 15, 1970) was a boxer from the Dominican Republic. Cruz was world lightweight champion from 1968 to 1969. He is the older brother of former super bantamweight world champion of boxing, Leo Cruz.

== Amateur career ==
Cruz claimed he didn't put on his first pair of boxing gloves until his 20th birthday. He fought as an amateur from 1957 to 1959, posting a 14–3 record.

== Personal ==
Cruz's father, Francisco Rosario Almonte was an army officer in the Dominican military. Cruz met his wife, Mildred Ortiz in the town of Río Piedras in Puerto Rico. They were married in 1961 when Ortiz was 24 years old. Cruz had two children.

Cruz's younger brother, Leo Cruz, went on to become a world champion.

== Pro career ==
He started his career as a professional boxer with a loss, being defeated by decision in eight rounds by Juan José Jiménez, October 23 of 1959 in Santo Domingo. His first win came on December 3 of that year, also in Santo Domingo, with a ten-round decision win over Rafael Acevedo.

After one more win in Santo Domingo, he moved to San Juan, Puerto Rico. There, he posted a record of 7 wins and 2 losses before returning to Santo Domingo in 1962. Out of the 7 wins in Puerto Rico during that era, 5 were by knockout. In his return to Santo Domingo, he posted a decision win over Acevedo in a rematch. Towards the end of 1962, he started campaigning in the United States, particularly in New York. There, he boxed 5 times before returning to San Juan for another bout. He won 4 and drew 1 of those fights, all wins by decision.

He spent the first half of 1964 touring Australia, where he won 2 fights and lost one. He lost on points to Graham Dicker in Brisbane, stopped Guizani Rezgui in Sydney and outpointed Gilberto Biondi in Melbourne. Then he returned to Latin America, his first fight after arriving from Australia being a major step up in quality of opposition for him: In Caracas, he met fellow world champion boxer Carlos Morocho Hernández. He was knocked out in four rounds by Hernandez. On to Panama City, where he lost a ten-round decision to Julio Ruiz. He finished his year by beating Marcos Morales, a boxer of Puerto Rico during this era, at Santo Domingo.

In 1965, he was undefeated. He fought in St. Croix, in Mayagüez, in Caguas and in London among other places. He won all ten of his bouts that year.

He won 8 bouts, lost 1 and drew 1 in 1966. He drew with Jaime Valladares in Quito, and lost to Frankie Narvaez in San Juan. But he also beat former world title challenger Bunny Grant. In 1967, he avenged his loss to Narvaez, and went undefeated the rest of the year, securing his position as the world's number one challenger among Lightweights.

He won three more fights to begin 1968, and then, on June 29 in Santo Domingo, he was given his first chance to challenge for a world title. He became world Lightweight champion when he defeated Carlos Ortiz by a decision in fifteen rounds.

He defended the world title with a fifteen-round decision over Mando Ramos in Los Angeles, and then, he closed the year by winning a non-title bout in Tokyo, also by decision, in ten.

There was a rematch between Cruz and Ramos, also held in Los Angeles. The second time around, Ramos became world Lightweight champion by beating Cruz with an eleventh-round knockout. Cruz went on to win his next three bouts of 1969.

On January 17 of 1970, Cruz won his last fight. He beat Benito Juarez in San Juan by a decision in ten, and then returned to Santo Domingo.

== Professional boxing record ==
57 fights	42 wins	13 losses
By knockout	14	2
By decision	28	10
By disqualification	0	1
Draws	2	

No.	Result	Record	Opponent	Type	Round	Date	Location	Notes
57	Win	42–13–2	Benito Juarez	UD	10	Jan 17, 1970	La Cancha Country Club, San Juan, Puerto Rico	
56	Win	41–13–2	Victor Melendez	UD	10	Oct 20, 1969	Madison Square Garden, New York City, New York, U.S.	
55	Win	40–13–2	Len Kesey	TKO	4 (10)	Oct 3, 1969	Country Club Stadium, San Juan, Puerto Rico	
54	Win	39–13–2	Grady Ponder	PTS	10	Aug 9, 1969	San Juan, Puerto Rico	
53	Loss	38–13–2	Mando Ramos	TKO	11 (15)	Feb 18, 1969	Memorial Coliseum, Los Angeles, California, U.S.	Lost WBA, WBC, and The Ring lightweight titles
52	Win	38–12–2	Hidemori Tsujimoto	UD	10	Dec 19, 1968	Korakuen Hall, Japan	
51	Win	37–12–2	Mando Ramos	UD	15	Sep 27, 1968	Memorial Coliseum, Los Angeles, California, U.S.	Retained WBA, WBC, and The Ring lightweight titles
50	Win	36–12–2	Carlos Ortiz	SD	15	Jun 29, 1968	Estadio Quisqueya, Santo Domingo, Dominican Republic	Won WBA, WBC, and The Ring lightweight titles
49	Win	35–12–2	Julio Viera	UD	10	Apr 15, 1968	Country Club Arena, San Juan, Puerto Rico	
48	Win	34–12–2	Johnny Bean	TKO	2 (10)	Mar 3, 1968	Santo Domingo, Dominican Republic	
47	Win	33–12–2	Chris Fernandez	KO	9 (10)	Jan 1, 1968	Kingston, Jamaica	
46	Win	32–12–2	Kennedy Clark	UD	10	Dec 11, 1967	Hiram Bithorn Stadium, San Juan, Puerto Rico	
45	Win	31–12–2	Grady Ponder	PTS	10	Jun 23, 1967	Santo Domingo, Dominican Republic	
44	Win	30–12–2	Frankie Narvaez	PTS	10	May 5, 1967	Hiram Bithorn Stadium, San Juan, Puerto Rico	
43	Loss	29–12–2	Frankie Narvaez	SD	10	Dec 12, 1966	Hiram Bithorn Stadium, San Juan, Puerto Rico	
42	Win	29–11–2	Fernand Simard	RTD	10	Oct 1, 1966	Hiram Bithorn Stadium, San Juan, Puerto Rico	
41	Win	28–11–2	Vicente Milan Derado	SD	10	Aug 20, 1966	Hiram Bithorn Stadium, San Juan, Puerto Rico	
40	Win	27–11–2	Bunny Grant	UD	10	May 7, 1966	Hiram Bithorn Stadium, San Juan, Puerto Rico	
39	Draw	26–11–2	Jaime Valladares	PTS	10	Apr 2, 1966	Plaza de Toros, Quito, Ecuador	
38	Win	26–11–1	Vicente Milan Derado	PTS	10	Sep 4, 1965	Hiram Bithorn Stadium, San Juan, Puerto Rico	
37	Win	25–11–1	Jose Chico Veliz	PTS	10	Aug 14, 1965	Mayaguez, Puerto Rico	
36	Win	24–11–1	Frankie Taylor	PTS	10	Jul 6, 1965	Town Hall, Shoreditch, London, England, U.K.	
35	Win	23–11–1	Daniel Berrios	KO	1 (10)	Jun 18, 1965	Caguas, Puerto Rico	
34	Win	22–11–1	Alejandro Parra	TKO	4 (10)	Apr 3, 1965	Hiram Bithorn Stadium, San Juan, Puerto Rico	
33	Win	21–11–1	Criscencio Fernandez	KO	3 (10)	Feb 19, 1965	D.C. Canegata Stadium, Altona, U.S. Virgin Islands	
32	Win	20–11–1	Marcos Morales	TKO	2 (10)	Dec 12, 1964	Hiram Bithorn Stadium, San Juan, Puerto Rico	
31	Loss	19–11–1	Julio Ruiz	MD	10	Sep 20, 1964	Estadio Olimpico, Panama City, Panama	
30	Loss	19–10–1	Carlos Morocho Hernández	TKO	2 (10)	Jun 1, 1964	Caracas, Venezuela	
29	Win	19–9–1	Gilberto Biondi	PTS	12	Mar 6, 1964	Festival Hall, Melbourne, Victoria, Australia	
28	Win	18–9–1	Guizani Rezgui	TKO	11 (12)	Mar 2, 1964	Sydney Stadium, Sydney, New South Wales, Australia	
27	Loss	17–9–1	Graham Dicker	PTS	12	Feb 14, 1964	Festival Hall, Brisbane, Queensland, Australia	
26	Loss	17–8–1	Vicente Milan Derado	PTS	10	Nov 1, 1963	Madison Square Garden, New York City, New York, U.S.	
25	Win	17–7–1	Johnny Bean	PTS	10	Jul 6, 1963	San Juan, Puerto Rico	
24	Win	16–7–1	George Foster	PTS	8	Mar 2, 1963	Madison Square Garden, New York City, New York, U.S.	
23	Win	15–7–1	Roland Kellem	UD	8	Feb 5, 1963	Sunnyside Garden, New York City, New York, U.S.	
22	Win	14–7–1	Calvin Woodland	PTS	6	Jan 12, 1963	Sunnyside Garden, New York City, New York, U.S.	
21	Win	13–7–1	Candy Parilla	PTS	6	Dec 18, 1962	Sunnyside Garden, New York City, New York, U.S.	
20	Draw	12–7–1	Freddie Jackson	PTS	6	Nov 24, 1962	Gladiators' Arena, Totowa, New Jersey, U.S.	
19	Win	12–7	Sammy Burgess	PTS	10	Sep 14, 1962	Sixto Escobar Stadium, San Juan, Puerto Rico	
18	Win	11–7	Alejandro Gonzalez	PTS	6	Jun 1, 1962	Sixto Escobar Stadium, San Juan, Puerto Rico	
17	Win	10–7	Rafael Acevedo	UD	12	Feb 17, 1962	Santo Domingo, Dominican Republic	
16	Win	9–7	Jose Aneiro	TKO	8 (8)	Jan 15, 1962	Sixto Escobar Stadium, San Juan, Puerto Rico	
15	Win	8–7	Lionel Rivera	TKO	8 (10)	Oct 17, 1961	Sixto Escobar Stadium, San Juan, Puerto Rico	
14	Loss	7–7	Daniel Berrios	PTS	4	Aug 29, 1961	Channel 11 Studio, San Juan, Puerto Rico	
13	Win	7–6	Gerardo Clemente	PTS	8	Aug 26, 1961	Sixto Escobar Stadium, San Juan, Puerto Rico	
12	Loss	6–6	Vernon Lynch	PTS	10	May 26, 1961	Sixto Escobar Stadium, San Juan, Puerto Rico	
11	Loss	6–5	Daniel Berrios	DQ	2 (10)	Feb 24, 1961	Sixto Escobar Stadium, San Juan, Puerto Rico	
10	Win	6–4	Gerardo Clemente	TKO	10 (10)	Nov 25, 1960	Sixto Escobar Stadium, San Juan, Puerto Rico	
9	Loss	5–4	Daniel Berrios	PTS	10	Sep 16, 1960	Sixto Escobar Stadium, San Juan, Puerto Rico	
8	Win	5–3	Lionel Rivera	PTS	10	Sep 2, 1960	Sixto Escobar Stadium, San Juan, Puerto Rico	
7	Loss	4–3	Marcos Morales	SD	10	Jul 5, 1960	Sixto Escobar Stadium, San Juan, Puerto Rico	
6	Win	4–2	Bob Ashford	KO	3 (6)	Jun 11, 1960	Sixto Escobar Stadium, San Juan, Puerto Rico	
5	Win	3–2	Estaquio Gonzalez	TKO	5 (6)	May 29, 1960	Sixto Escobar Stadium, San Juan, Puerto Rico	
4	Loss	2–2	Daniel Berrios	PTS	10	May 6, 1960	Sixto Escobar Stadium, San Juan, Puerto Rico	
3	Win	2–1	Jesus M Serrano	PTS	6	Mar 26, 1960	Coliseo San Rafael, Santo Domingo	
2	Win	1–1	Rafael Acevedo	PTS	10	Dec 3, 1959	Santo Domingo, Dominican Republic	
1	Loss	0–1	Juan Jimenez	PTS	8	Oct 23, 1959	Santo Domingo, Dominican Republic	

== Titles in boxing ==
=== Major world titles ===
- WBA lightweight champion (135 lbs)
- WBC lightweight champion (135 lbs)

=== The Ring magazine titles ===
- The Ring lightweight champion (135 lbs)

=== Undisputed titles ===
- Undisputed lightweight champion

== Death ==
On February 15, 1970, Cruz was flying back to San Juan alongside his family for a fight against Roger Zami, when their Dominicana de Aviación DC-9 plane crashed into the waters of the Caribbean shortly after take-off, killing Cruz, his wife and two children, along with all other passengers and crew on board, which included the coach and eleven players of the Puerto Rico women's national volleyball team.

== See also ==
- List of world lightweight boxing champions

Sporting positions
World boxing titles
Preceded by Carlos Ortiz	WBA lightweight champion June 29, 1968 – February 18, 1969	Succeeded by Mando Ramos
Preceded by Carlos Ortiz	WBC lightweight champion June 29, 1968 – February 18, 1969	Succeeded by Mando Ramos
Preceded by Carlos Ortiz	The Ring lightweight champion June 29, 1968 – February 18, 1969	Succeeded by Mando Ramos
Preceded by Carlos Ortiz	Undisputed lightweight champion June 29, 1968 – February 18, 1969	Succeeded by Mando Ramos
