= Mando Ramos =

American boxer

Personal information
- Born: Armando Ramos; November 15, 1948 Long Beach, California, United States
- Died: July 6, 2008 (aged 59) San Pedro, California, United States
- Height: 5 ft 9 in (175 cm)
- Weight: Lightweight

Boxing career
- Reach: 71 1/2 in (182 cm)
- Stance: Orthodox

Boxing record
- Total fights: 49
- Wins: 37
- Win by KO: 23
- Losses: 11
- Draws: 1

Armando Ramos (November 15, 1948 – July 6, 2008) was an American professional boxer and the former Undisputed Lightweight Champion. He was born in Long Beach, California. Armando "Mando" Ramos was one of the most popular fighters in Southern California during the 1960s. Ramos was an outstanding amateur.

== Professional career ==
Mando Ramos turned pro at age 17 using a forged birth certificate. Mando went on to fight the main event at the Olympic Auditorium by his 8th pro fight. At the age of 18 Mando defeated the reigning Jr. Lightweight Champ, Japan's Hiroshi Kobayashi, in a non-title bout. When offered a re-match for the title, Ramos refused to fight for a 'Junior' title.

=== World Lightweight Champion ===
He demanded to fight dangerous Lightweight Champ Carlos Ortiz—Ortiz, who had dominated the division for over a decade. Negotiations were in place, but Ortiz was upset by 'Teo' Cruz and so Ramos took the fight to the new champ, narrowly losing in a decision. Ramos won the re-match via KO to become the youngest Lightweight Champion in history. Cruz would only live 11 more months. He died in a plane crash in January 1970 alongside the Puerto Rican national women's volleyball team at the Dominicana DC-9 air disaster.

When a Mando Ramos fight was held in Los Angeles, movie stars such as John Wayne, Bill Cosby, Kirk Douglas, Liz Taylor and Connie Stevens attended. Women caught Mandomania, and Hollywood loved 'The Wonder Boy'.

Trained by Hall of Fame trainer Jackie McCoy, Ramos fought ten World title fights, was a two-time champion and earned millions of dollars. Whilst Mickey Mantle and Joe Namath earned 100k per season, Ramos was earning 100k per fight. He was the world's highest paid teenager and his purses were larger than anyone but Muhammad Ali's. McCoy stated Mando was the most naturally talented fighter he had ever seen in his life.

== Retirement ==
Tough fights, drugs, and alcohol put the brakes on his career. By age 24 Ramos was out of boxing. With the aid of his wife, Sylvia Van Hecke, Ramos became clean and sober over his last three decades. He founded a non-profit youth organization---B.A.A.D.--boxing against alcohol and drugs— and coached, mentored, and trained inner-city at-risk youths.

Mando Ramos died suddenly at his home in San Pedro, California on July 6, 2008.

== Professional boxing record ==
49 fights	37 wins	11 losses
By knockout	23	6
By decision	14	4
By disqualification	0	1
Draws	1	

No.	Result	Record	Opponent	Type	Round	Date	Age	Location	Notes
49	Loss	37–11–1	Wayne Beale	TKO	2 (10)	Oct 29, 1975	26 years, 348 days	Silver Slipper, Las Vegas, Nevada, U.S.	
48	Win	37–10–1	Antonio Leyva	TKO	7 (10)	Oct 15, 1975	26 years, 334 days	Silver Slipper, Las Vegas, Nevada, U.S.	
47	Win	36–10–1	Tony Martinez	UD	10	Sep 2, 1975	26 years, 291 days	Red Carpet Inn, Oklahoma City, Oklahoma, U.S.	
46	Loss	35–10–1	Tony Martinez	SD	10	Jul 30, 1975	26 years, 257 days	Silver Slipper, Las Vegas, Nevada, U.S.	
45	Loss	35–9–1	Wolfgang Gans	TKO	5 (?)	Jul 12, 1974	25 years, 239 days	Palma de Mallorca, Islas Baleares, Spain	
44	Loss	35–8–1	Wolfgang Gans	KO	2 (?)	Jun 3, 1974	25 years, 200 days	Luebeck, Schleswig-Holstein, Germany	
43	Win	35–7–1	Arpad Magyar	KO	4 (?)	May 16, 1974	25 years, 182 days	Ernst Merck Halle, Hamburg, Germany	
42	Win	34–7–1	Mi Whan Kim	TKO	2 (8)	May 10, 1974	25 years, 176 days	Luebeck, Schleswig-Holstein, Germany	
41	Draw	33–7–1	Jaroslav Travnik	PTS	8	May 4, 1974	25 years, 170 days	Stadthalle, Vienna, Austria	
40	Loss	33–7	Arturo Pineda	TKO	5 (10)	Aug 9, 1973	24 years, 267 days	Olympic Auditorium, Los Angeles, California, U.S.	
39	Loss	33–6	Chango Carmona	TKO	8 (15)	Sep 15, 1972	23 years, 305 days	Memorial Coliseum, Los Angeles, California, U.S.	Lost WBC lightweight title
38	Win	33–5	Pedro Carrasco	SD	15	Jun 28, 1972	23 years, 226 days	Palacio de los Deportes, Madrid, Comunidad de Madrid, Spain	Retained WBC lightweight title
37	Win	32–5	Pedro Carrasco	SD	15	Feb 18, 1972	23 years, 95 days	Sports Arena, Los Angeles, California, U.S.	Won WBC lightweight title
36	Loss	31–5	Pedro Carrasco	DQ	12 (15)	Nov 5, 1971	22 years, 355 days	Palacio de los Deportes, Madrid, Comunidad de Madrid, Spain	For vacant WBC lightweight title
35	Win	31–4	Ruben Navarro	UD	10	Sep 30, 1971	22 years, 319 days	Olympic Auditorium, Los Angeles, California, U.S.	
34	Win	30–4	Raul Rojas	TKO	6 (10)	Dec 10, 1970	22 years, 25 days	Olympic Auditorium, Los Angeles, California, U.S.	
33	Win	29–4	Sugar Ramos	SD	10	Aug 6, 1970	21 years, 264 days	Olympic Auditorium, Los Angeles, California, U.S.	
32	Loss	28–4	Ismael Laguna	TKO	9 (15)	Mar 3, 1970	21 years, 108 days	Sports Arena, Los Angeles, California, U.S.	Lost WBA, WBC, and The Ring lightweight titles
31	Win	28–3	Raton Palacios	UD	10	Jan 13, 1970	21 years, 59 days	Municipal Auditorium, San Antonio, Texas, U.S.	
30	Win	27–3	Yoshiaki Numata	KO	6 (15)	Oct 4, 1969	20 years, 323 days	Sports Arena, Los Angeles, California, U.S.	Retained WBA, WBC, and The Ring lightweight titles
29	Win	26–3	Jerry Graci	TKO	7 (10)	May 20, 1969	20 years, 186 days	Honolulu International Center, Honolulu, Hawaii, U.S.	
28	Win	25–3	Carlos Teo Cruz	TKO	11 (15)	Feb 18, 1969	20 years, 95 days	Memorial Coliseum, Los Angeles, California, U.S.	Won WBA, WBC, and The Ring lightweight titles
27	Win	24–3	Beau Jaynes	TKO	2 (10)	Dec 12, 1968	20 years, 27 days	Olympic Auditorium, Los Angeles, California, U.S.	
26	Win	23–3	Billy Coleman	TKO	3 (10)	Oct 29, 1968	19 years, 349 days	Convention Center Arena, San Antonio, Texas, U.S.	
25	Loss	22–3	Carlos Teo Cruz	UD	15	Sep 27, 1968	19 years, 317 days	Memorial Coliseum, Los Angeles, California, U.S.	For WBA, WBC, The Ring lightweight titles
24	Win	22–2	Hiroshi Kobayashi	UD	10	Jun 20, 1968	19 years, 218 days	Olympic Auditorium, Los Angeles, California, U.S.	
23	Win	21–2	Phil Garcia	KO	9 (10)	May 2, 1968	19 years, 169 days	Olympic Auditorium, Los Angeles, California, U.S.	
22	Win	20–2	Frankie Crawford	UD	10	Feb 1, 1968	19 years, 78 days	Olympic Auditorium, Los Angeles, California, U.S.	
21	Loss	19–2	Frankie Crawford	MD	10	Oct 5, 1967	18 years, 324 days	Olympic Auditorium, Los Angeles, California, U.S.	
20	Win	19–1	Eliseo Estrada	TKO	5 (10)	Sep 14, 1967	18 years, 303 days	Olympic Auditorium, Los Angeles, California, U.S.	
19	Win	18–1	Alex Luna	TKO	2 (10)	Aug 15, 1967	18 years, 273 days	Memorial Auditorium, Sacramento, California, U.S.	
18	Loss	17–1	Kang Il Suh	UD	10	Jul 6, 1967	18 years, 233 days	Olympic Auditorium, Los Angeles, California, U.S.	
17	Win	17–0	Len Kesey	TKO	5 (10)	Jun 22, 1967	18 years, 219 days	Olympic Auditorium, Los Angeles, California, U.S.	
16	Win	16–0	Pete Gonzalez	UD	10	Mar 30, 1967	18 years, 135 days	Olympic Auditorium, Los Angeles, California, U.S.	
15	Win	15–0	Ray Echevarria	UD	10	Jan 12, 1967	18 years, 58 days	Olympic Auditorium, Los Angeles, California, U.S.	
14	Win	14–0	Al Franklin	KO	4 (10)	Nov 28, 1966	18 years, 13 days	Oakland Arena, Oakland, California, U.S.	
13	Win	13–0	Al Franklin	UD	10	Nov 17, 1966	18 years, 2 days	Olympic Auditorium, Los Angeles, California, U.S.	
12	Win	12–0	Allen Syers	TKO	5 (10)	Oct 13, 1966	17 years, 332 days	Olympic Auditorium, Los Angeles, California, U.S.	
11	Win	11–0	Jorge Baby Salazar	UD	10	Sep 8, 1966	17 years, 297 days	Olympic Auditorium, Los Angeles, California, U.S.	
10	Win	10–0	Manny Linson	KO	2 (10)	Aug 11, 1966	17 years, 269 days	Olympic Auditorium, Los Angeles, California, U.S.	
9	Win	9–0	Ray Coleman	TKO	6 (10)	Jul 21, 1966	17 years, 248 days	Olympic Auditorium, Los Angeles, California, U.S.	
8	Win	8–0	Joey Aguilar	KO	8 (10)	Jul 7, 1966	17 years, 234 days	Olympic Auditorium, Los Angeles, California, U.S.	
7	Win	7–0	Jerry Stevens	KO	1 (6)	Jun 23, 1966	17 years, 220 days	Olympic Auditorium, Los Angeles, California, U.S.	
6	Win	6–0	Bosco Basilio	UD	6	May 12, 1966	17 years, 178 days	Olympic Auditorium, Los Angeles, California, U.S.	
5	Win	5–0	Jose Barrera	KO	2 (6)	Mar 17, 1966	17 years, 122 days	Olympic Auditorium, Los Angeles, California, U.S.	
4	Win	4–0	Fidel Cruz	KO	3 (5)	Mar 3, 1966	17 years, 108 days	Olympic Auditorium, Los Angeles, California, U.S.	
3	Win	3–0	Berlin Roberts	KO	1 (5)	Jan 27, 1966	17 years, 73 days	Olympic Auditorium, Los Angeles, California, U.S.	
2	Win	2–0	Chuey Loera	KO	4 (4)	Dec 2, 1965	17 years, 17 days	Olympic Auditorium, Los Angeles, California, U.S.	
1	Win	1–0	Berlin Roberts	PTS	5	Nov 18, 1965	17 years, 3 days	Olympic Auditorium, Los Angeles, California, U.S.	

== Titles in boxing ==
=== Major world titles ===
- WBA lightweight champion (135 lbs)
- WBC lightweight champion (135 lbs) (2×)

=== The Ring magazine titles ===
- The Ring lightweight champion (135 lbs)

=== Undisputed titles ===
- Undisputed lightweight champion

== See also ==
- List of world lightweight boxing champions

Sporting positions
World boxing titles
Preceded by Carlos Cruz	WBA lightweight champion February 18, 1969 – March 3, 1970	Succeeded by Ismael Laguna
Preceded by Carlos Cruz	WBC lightweight champion February 18, 1969 – March 3, 1970	Succeeded by Ismael Laguna
Preceded by Carlos Cruz	The Ring lightweight champion February 18, 1969 – March 3, 1970	Succeeded by Ismael Laguna
Preceded by Carlos Cruz	Undisputed lightweight champion February 18, 1969 – March 3, 1970	Succeeded by Ismael Laguna
Preceded by Pedro Carrasco	WBC lightweight champion February 18, 1972 – September 15, 1972	Succeeded by Chango Carmona
