= Ismael Laguna =

Panamanian boxer (1943–2026)

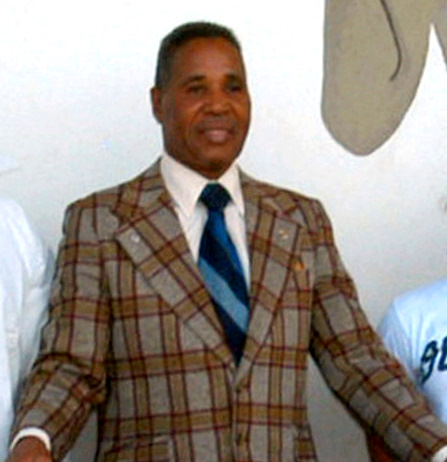
- Laguna in 2006

Personal information
- Nickname: El Tigre Colonense
- Born: Ismael Laguna Meneses; June 28, 1943 Colón, Panama
- Died: September 8, 2026 (aged 83) Panama City, Panama
- Height: 5 ft 9 in (175 cm)
- Weight: Lightweight

Boxing career
- Reach: 68 in (173 cm)
- Stance: Orthodox

Boxing record
- Total fights: 75
- Wins: 65
- Win by KO: 37
- Losses: 9
- Draws: 1

Ismael Laguna Meneses (June 28, 1943 – September 8, 2026) was a Panamanian professional boxer and two-time Undisputed Lightweight Champion. He was inducted into the International Boxing Hall of Fame in 2001.

== Professional career ==
Known as "El Tigre Colonense", Laguna was the World Lightweight Champion in 1965 and later regained the belt in 1970, but he was stripped of his WBC title prior to losing the WBA title to Ken Buchanan.

Laguna also lost 15 round decisions in two other bids to regain his lightweight title, in 1967 against Carlos Ortiz, and in 1971 to Ken Buchanan. He retired after the loss to Buchanan in 1971.

He was inducted into the International Boxing Hall of Fame in 2001.

== Death ==
Laguna died on September 8, 2026, at the age of 83. He died on the same day as Panamanian boxing coach María Toto.

== Professional boxing record ==
75 fights	65 wins	9 losses
By knockout	37	0
By decision	28	9
Draws	1	

No.	Result	Record	Opponent	Type	Round	Date	Location	Notes
75	Loss	65–9–1	Ken Buchanan	UD	15	Sep 13, 1971	Madison Square Garden, New York City, New York, U.S.	For WBA and The Ring lightweight titles
74	Loss	65–8–1	Eddie Linder	SD	10	Jun 22, 1971	Auditorium, Miami Beach, Florida, U.S.	
73	Win	65–7–1	Chango Carmona	UD	10	Apr 3, 1971	Gimnasio Nuevo Panama, Panama City, Panama	
72	Win	64–7–1	Lloyd Marshall	UD	10	Mar 6, 1971	Gimnasio Nuevo Panama, Panama City, Panama	
71	Loss	63–7–1	Ken Buchanan	SD	15	Sep 26, 1970	Hiram Bithorn Stadium, San Juan, Puerto Rico	Lost WBA and The Ring lightweight titles For vacant NYSAC lightweight title
70	Win	63–6–1	Guts Ishimatsu	TKO	13 (15)	Jun 6, 1970	Gimnasio Nuevo Panama, Panama City, Panama	Retained WBA, WBC, and The Ring lightweight titles
69	Win	62–6–1	Mando Ramos	TKO	9 (15)	Mar 3, 1970	Sports Arena, Los Angeles, California, U.S.	Won WBA, WBC, and The Ring lightweight titles
68	Win	61–6–1	Jose Luis Vallejo	TKO	3 (10)	Jan 24, 1970	Arena de Colón, Colón City, Panama	
67	Win	60–6–1	Genaro Soto	UD	10	Jul 14, 1969	Madison Square Garden, New York City, New York, U.S.	
66	Win	59–6–1	Eugenio Espinoza	UD	10	Jul 5, 1969	Estadio Juan D. Arosemena, Panama City, Panama	
65	Loss	58–6–1	Eugenio Espinoza	UD	10	May 24, 1969	Plaza de Toros, Quito, Ecuador	
64	Win	58–5–1	Maurice Tavant	PTS	10	Mar 31, 1969	Palais des Sports, Lyon, Rhône, France	
63	Win	57–5–1	Curly Aguirre	TKO	4 (10)	Mar 2, 1969	Estadio Juan D. Arosemena, Panama City, Panama	
62	Win	56–5–1	Roman Blanco	MD	10	Nov 15, 1968	Madison Square Garden, New York City, New York, U.S.	
61	Win	55–5–1	Grady Ponder	UD	10	Oct 22, 1968	Auditorium, Miami Beach, Florida, U.S.	
60	Win	54–5–1	Gabe LaMarca	TKO	8 (10)	Oct 7, 1968	Catholic Youth Center, Scranton, Pennsylvania, U.S.	
59	Win	53–5–1	Lloyd Marshall	TKO	9 (10)	Aug 20, 1968	Madison Square Garden, New York City, New York, U.S.	
58	Win	52–5–1	Victor Melendez	UD	10	Jul 17, 1968	Madison Square Garden, New York City, New York, U.S.	
57	Win	51–5–1	Frankie Narvaez	UD	10	Apr 29, 1968	Hiram Bithorn Stadium, San Juan, Puerto Rico	
56	Win	50–5–1	Bud Anderson	TKO	10 (10)	Apr 15, 1968	Arena, Philadelphia, Pennsylvania, U.S.	
55	Win	49–5–1	Ray Adigun	PTS	10	Feb 26, 1968	Paris, France	
54	Win	48–5–1	Paul Armstead	UD	10	Oct 28, 1967	Estadio Juan D. Arosemena, Panama City, Panama	
53	Loss	47–5–1	Carlos Ortiz	UD	15	Aug 16, 1967	Shea Stadium, Queens, New York City, New York, U.S.	For WBA, WBC, and The Ring lightweight titles
52	Win	47–4–1	Alfredo Urbina	UD	10	Jun 3, 1967	Estadio Juan D. Arosemena, Panama City, Panama	
51	Win	46–4–1	Vicente Rivas	KO	5 (10)	Apr 1, 1967	Estadio Juan D. Arosemena, Panama City, Panama	
50	Win	45–4–1	Frankie Narvaez	UD	12	Mar 10, 1967	Madison Square Garden, New York City, New York, U.S.	
49	Win	44–4–1	Daniel Guanin	TKO	8 (10)	Dec 3, 1966	Estadio Juan D. Arosemena, Panama City, Panama	
48	Win	43–4–1	Percy Hayles	TKO	6 (10)	Oct 1, 1966	National Stadium, Kingston, Jamaica	
47	Win	42–4–1	Al Grant	UD	10	Jul 28, 1966	Olympic Auditorium, Los Angeles, California, U.S.	
46	Loss	41–4–1	Gabriel Elorde	UD	10	Mar 19, 1966	Araneta Coliseum, Barangay Cubao, Quezon City, Metro Manila, Philippines	
45	Win	41–3–1	Carlos Hernández	TKO	8 (10)	Feb 19, 1966	Estadio Juan D. Arosemena, Panama City, Panama	
44	Loss	40–3–1	Carlos Ortiz	UD	15	Nov 13, 1965	Hiram Bithorn Stadium, San Juan, Puerto Rico	Lost WBA, WBC, and The Ring lightweight titles
43	Draw	40–2–1	Nicolino Locche	PTS	10	Jul 17, 1965	Estadio Luna Park, Buenos Aires, Distrito Federal, Argentina	
42	Win	40–2	Raul Soriano	TKO	8 (10)	Jun 19, 1965	Estadio Olimpico, Panama City, Panama	
41	Win	39–2	Carlos Ortiz	MD	15	Apr 10, 1965	Estadio Olimpico, Panama City, Panama	Won WBA, WBC, and The Ring lightweight titles
40	Win	38–2	Sebastiao Nascimento	UD	10	Dec 20, 1964	Estadio Olimpico, Panama City, Panama	
39	Win	37–2	Percy Hayles	TKO	7 (10)	Oct 25, 1964	Estadio Olimpico, Panama City, Panama	
38	Win	36–2	Vicente Milan Derado	UD	10	Aug 2, 1964	Estadio Olimpico, Panama City, Panama	
37	Win	35–2	Kid Anahuac	TKO	8 (10)	Jul 6, 1964	Sports Arena, Los Angeles, California, U.S.	
36	Loss	34–2	Vicente Saldivar	UD	10	Jun 1, 1964	Plaza de Toros, Tijuana, Baja California, Mexico	
35	Win	34–1	Angel Robinson Garcia	PTS	10	Mar 9, 1964	Palais des Sports, Paris, France	
34	Win	33–1	Oripes dos Santos	KO	7 (10)	Feb 21, 1964	Ginásio Estadual do Ibirapuera, Sao Paulo, Brazil	
33	Win	32–1	Pedro Miranda	TKO	4 (10)	Jan 26, 1964	Arena de Colón, Colón City, Panama	
32	Win	31–1	Rafiu King	UD	10	Nov 18, 1963	Palais des Sports, Paris, France	
31	Win	30–1	Antonio Herrera	TKO	6 (10)	Sep 15, 1963	Estadio Nacional, Panama City, Panama	
30	Win	29–1	Eduardo Guerrero	UD	10	Aug 25, 1963	Estadio Nacional, Panama City, Panama	
29	Win	28–1	Don Johnson	TKO	3 (10)	Jul 21, 1963	Estadio Nacional, Panama City, Panama	
28	Loss	27–1	Antonio Herrera	PTS	10	Jun 7, 1963	Plaza de Toros Santamaria, Bogota, Colombia	
27	Win	27–0	Fili Nava	KO	3 (10)	May 20, 1963	Estadio Nacional, Panama City, Panama	
26	Win	26–0	Auburn Copeland	UD	10	Mar 17, 1963	Plaza de Toros La Macarena, Panama City, Panama	
25	Win	25–0	Juan Ramirez	UD	10	Feb 22, 1963	Estadio Nacional, Panama City, Panama	
24	Win	24–0	Bobby Gray	TKO	9 (10)	Jan 20, 1963	Arena de Colón, Colón City, Panama	
23	Win	23–0	Tony Herrera	KO	2 (10)	Dec 16, 1962	Gimnasio Nacional, Panama City, Panama	
22	Win	22–0	Enrique Hitchman	KO	2 (10)	Nov 18, 1962	Gimnasio Nacional, Panama City, Panama	
21	Win	21–0	Beresford Francis	TKO	5 (10)	Oct 28, 1962	Arena de Colón, Colón City, Panama	
20	Win	20–0	Pedro Ortiz	TKO	7 (10)	Sep 16, 1962	Gimnasio Nacional, Panama City, Panama	
19	Win	19–0	Jorge Baby Salazar	TKO	6 (10)	Jul 29, 1962	Arena de Colón, Colón City, Panama	
18	Win	18–0	Carlos Celis	TKO	5 (10)	Jun 24, 1962	Arena de Colón, Colón City, Panama	
17	Win	17–0	Agustin Carmona	KO	6 (10)	Jun 10, 1962	Gimnasio Nacional, Panama City, Panama	
16	Win	16–0	Jorge Uzcategui	TKO	2 (10)	Jun 3, 1962	Arena de Colón, Colón City, Panama	
15	Win	15–0	Nelson Estrada	TKO	7 (10)	Apr 15, 1962	Arena de Colón, Colón City, Panama	
14	Win	14–0	Castor Castillo	PTS	10	Mar 2, 1962	Maracaibo, Venezuela	
13	Win	13–0	Eloy Sanchez	KO	4 (10)	Jan 14, 1962	Arena de Colón, Colón City, Panama	
12	Win	12–0	Hector Hicks	KO	5 (10)	Dec 1, 1961	Arena de Colón, Colón City, Panama	
11	Win	11–0	Euro Partides	KO	4 (10)	Oct 15, 1961	Gimnasio Nacional, Panama City, Panama	
10	Win	10–0	Enrique Hitchman	UD	10	Aug 27, 1961	Gimnasio Nacional, Panama City, Panama	
9	Win	9–0	Claudio Martínez	TKO	4 (10)	Jun 25, 1961	Arena de Colón, Colón City, Panama	
8	Win	8–0	Killer Solomon	KO	7 (10)	Jun 4, 1961	Arena de Colón, Colón City, Panama	
7	Win	7–0	Battling Escudero	KO	2 (6)	May 21, 1961	Arena de Colón, Colón City, Panama	
6	Win	6–0	Ernesto Campbell	UD	6	Apr 30, 1961	Gimnasio Nacional, Panama City, Panama	
5	Win	5–0	Jose Pacheco	KO	3 (4)	Apr 16, 1961	Gimnasio Nacional, Panama City, Panama	
4	Win	4–0	Carlos Real	SD	6	Mar 26, 1961	Gimnasio Nacional, Panama City, Panama	
3	Win	3–0	Javier Valle	UD	4	Mar 5, 1961	Gimnasio Nacional, Panama City, Panama	
2	Win	2–0	Eduardo Frutos	UD	4	Jan 22, 1961	Arena de Colón, Colón City, Panama	
1	Win	1–0	Antonio Morgan	KO	2 (4)	Aug 21, 1960	Gimnasio Nacional, Panama City, Panama	

== Titles in boxing ==
=== Major world titles ===
- WBA lightweight champion (135 lbs) (2×)
- WBC lightweight champion (135 lbs) (2×)

=== The Ring magazine titles ===
- The Ring lightweight champion (135 lbs) (2×)

=== Undisputed titles ===
- Undisputed lightweight champion (2×)

== Other honors ==
- Inducted into the International Boxing Hall of Fame (2001).
- Inducted into the World Boxing Hall of Fame (1999).

== See also ==
- Lineal championship
- List of world lightweight boxing champions

Sporting positions
World boxing titles
Preceded by Carlos Ortiz	WBA lightweight champion April 10, 1965 – November 13, 1965	Succeeded by Carlos Ortiz
Preceded by Carlos Ortiz	WBC lightweight champion April 10, 1965 – November 13, 1965	Succeeded by Carlos Ortiz
Preceded by Carlos Ortiz	The Ring lightweight champion April 10, 1965 – November 13, 1965	Succeeded by Carlos Ortiz
Preceded by Carlos Ortiz	Undisputed lightweight champion April 10, 1965 – November 13, 1965	Succeeded by Carlos Ortiz
Preceded by Mando Ramos	WBA lightweight champion March 3, 1970 – September 26, 1970	Succeeded by Ken Buchanan
Preceded by Mando Ramos	WBC lightweight champion March 3, 1970 – September 15, 1970; Stripped	Vacant Title next held by Ken Buchanan
Preceded by Mando Ramos	The Ring lightweight champion March 3, 1970 – September 26, 1970	Succeeded by Ken Buchanan
Preceded by Mando Ramos	Undisputed lightweight champion March 3, 1970 – September 15, 1970; Titles fragmented	Vacant Title next held by Ken Buchanan
