= List of world lightweight boxing champions =

This is a list of world lightweight boxing champions by organization, as recognized by four of the better-known sanctioning organizations:

- The World Boxing Association (WBA), founded in 1921 as the National Boxing Association (NBA),
- The World Boxing Council (WBC), founded in 1963,
- The International Boxing Federation (IBF), founded in 1983,
- The World Boxing Organization (WBO), founded in 1988

== World ==
Reign began	Reign ended	Champion	Recognition
29 October 1886	9 June 1893	(United States) Jack McAuliffe	Universal
After McAuliffe's retirement, the title remained inactive until 1896, when the title was won by George "Kid" Lavigne in a 17 Round KO against Dick Burge. Lavigne's victory, the first fought under the Marquess of Queensberry rules, was considered by boxing promoters of the time as the first officially recognized world Lightweight Champion.
1 June 1896	3 July 1899	(United States) George "Kid" Lavigne	Universal
3 July 1899	12 May 1902	(United States) Frank Erne	Universal
12 May 1902	4 July 1908	(United States) Joe Gans	Universal
4 July 1908	22 February 1910	(United States) Oscar "Battling" Nelson	Universal
22 February 1910	28 November 1912	(United States) Adolph "Ad" Wolgast	Universal
28 November 1912	7 July 1914	(United States) Willie Ritchie	Universal
7 July 1914	28 May 1917	(United Kingdom) Freddie Welsh	Universal
28 May 1917	15 January 1925	(United States) Benny Leonard	Universal
Following Leonard's retirement, the vacant undisputed NBA and NYSAC lightweight title was filled when Jimmy Goodrich defeated Stanislaus Loayza.
13 July 1925	7 December 1925	(United States) Jimmy Goodrich	Universal
7 December 1925	3 July 1926	(United States) Rocky Kansas	Universal
3 July 1926	17 July 1930	(United States) Sammy Mandel	NBA
17 July 1930	14 November 1930	(United States) Al Singer	Universal
14 November 1930	23 June 1933	(United States) Tony Canzoneri	Universal
23 June 1933	15 Apr 1935	(United States) Barney Ross	Universal
Ross vacated the title and campaigned as a light welterweight and welterweight. The vacant undisputed NBA and NYSAC lightweight title was filled when Tony Canzoneri defeated Lou Ambers
10 May 1935	3 September 1936	(United States) Tony Canzoneri	Universal
3 September 1936	17 July? 1938	(United States) Lou Ambers	Universal
17 August? 1938	22 August 1939	(United States) Henry Armstrong	Universal
22 August 1939	10 May 1940	(United States) Lou Ambers	NBA
10 May 1940	19 December 1941	(United States) Lew Jenkins	Universal
19 December 1941	13 November 1942	(United States) Sammy Angott	Universal
Following Angott's retirement, the NBA and NYSAC titles were disputed between Beau Jack, Bob Montgomery, and Juan Zurita as well as Angott, who later came out of retirement. Ike Williams defeats over Zurita and Montgomery, in 1945 and 1947 respectively, would become recognized as the undisputed Lightweight Champion.
18 December 1942	21 May 1943	(United States) Beau Jack	NYSAC
21 May 1943	19 November 1943	(United States) Bob Montgomery	NYSAC
19 November 1943	3 March 1944	(United States) Beau Jack	NYSAC
3 March 1944	4 August 1947	(United States) Bob Montgomery	NYSAC
27 October 1943	8 March 1944	(United States) Sammy Angott	NBA
Angott won the vacant NBA lightweight title versus Slugger White.
8 March 1944	18 April 1945	(Mexico) Juan Zurita	NBA
18 April 1945	25 May 1951	(United States) Ike Williams	Universal
Ike Williams became the undisputed champion on the 4th of August, 1947 when he knocked out Bob Montgomery, retaining his NBA title and winning Montgomery's NYSAC title.
25 May 1951	1 April 1952	(United States) Jimmy Carter	Universal
14 May 1952	15 October 1952	(Mexico) Lauro Salas	Universal
15 October 1952	6 February 1954	(United States) Jimmy Carter	Universal
5 March 1954	17 November 1954	(United States) Paddy DeMarco	Universal
17 November 1954	29 June 1955	(United States) Jimmy Carter	Universal
29 June 1955	24 August 1956	(United States) Wallace "Bud" Smith	Universal
24 August 1956	21 April 1962	(United States) Joe Brown	Universal
1963-04-07	1965-04-10	(Puerto Rico) Carlos Ortiz	WBA/WBC
1965-04-10	1965-11-13	(Panama) Ismael Laguna	WBA/WBC
1965-11-13	1968-06-29	(Puerto Rico) Carlos Ortiz	WBA/WBC
1968-06-29	1969-02-18	(Dominican Republic) Carlos Teo Cruz	WBA/WBC
1969-02-18	1970-03-03	(United States) Mando Ramos	WBA/WBC
1970-03-03	1970-09-15	(Panama) Ismael Laguna	WBA/WBC
1971-02-12	1971-06-25	(United Kingdom) Ken Buchanan	WBA/WBC

== WBC ==
Reign began	Reign ended	Champion	Recognition
1963-04-07	1965-04-10	(Puerto Rico) Carlos Ortiz	WBC
1965-04-10	1965-11-13	(Panama) Ismael Laguna	WBC
1965-11-13	1968-06-29	(Puerto Rico) Carlos Ortiz	WBC
1968-06-29	1969-02-18	(Dominican Republic) Carlos Teo Cruz	WBC
1969-02-18	1970-03-03	(United States) Mando Ramos	WBC
1970-03-03	1970-09-15-Stripped	(Panama) Ismael Laguna	WBC
1971-02-12	1971-06-25-Stripped	(United Kingdom) Ken Buchanan	WBC
1971-11-05	1972-02-18	(Spain) Pedro Carrasco	WBC
1972-02-18	1972-09-15	(United States) Mando Ramos	WBC
1972-09-15	1972-11-10	(Mexico) Chango Carmona	WBC
1972-11-10	1974-04-11	(Mexico) Rodolfo Gato González	WBC
1974-04-11	1976-05-08	(Japan) Guts Ishimatsu	WBC
1976-05-08	1978-01-21	(Puerto Rico) Esteban De Jesús	WBC
1978-01-21	1979-01-31	(Panama) Roberto Durán	WBC
Durán became WBA champion in 1972 by defeating Ken Buchanan. He unified the titles on January 21, 1978, by defeating Esteban De Jesús.
1979-04-17	1981-06-20	(United Kingdom) Jim Watt	WBC
1981-06-20	1983-Vacated	(Nicaragua) Alexis Argüello	WBC
1983-05-01	1984-11-03	(Puerto Rico) Edwin Rosario	WBC
1984-11-03	1985-08-10	(Mexico) José Luis Ramírez	WBC
1985-08-10	1987-Vacated	(Puerto Rico) Héctor Camacho	WBC
1987-07-19	1988-10-29	(Mexico) José Luis Ramírez	WBC
1988-10-29	1989	(Mexico) Julio César Chávez	WBC
1989-08-20	1991-10-05	(United States) Pernell Whitaker	WBC
1992-08-24	1995-08-19	(Mexico) Miguel Ángel González	WBC
1996-04-20	1997-03-01	(France) Jean Baptiste Mendy	WBC
1997-03-01	1998-06-13	(United States) Stevie Johnston	WBC
1998-06-13	1999-02-27	(Mexico) Cesar Bazan	WBC
1999-02-27	2000-06-17	(United States) Stevie Johnston	WBC
2000-06-17	2002-04-20	(Mexico) José Luis Castillo	WBC
2002-04-20	2003-11-01	(United States) Floyd Mayweather Jr.	WBC
2004-06-05	2005-05-07	(Mexico) José Luis Castillo	WBC
2005-05-07	2006-10-06-Stripped	(United States) Diego Corrales	WBC
2006-10-07	2007-02-01	(Cuba) Joel Casamayor	WBC
2007-02-01	2008-06-28	(United States) David Díaz	WBC
2008-06-28	2009-02-24-Vacated	(Philippines) Manny Pacquiao	WBC
2009-04-04	2010-02-09-Vacated	(Venezuela) Edwin Valero	WBC
2010-03-17	2011-07-01-Vacated	(Mexico) Humberto Soto	WBC
2011-10-15	2012-11-17	(Mexico) Antonio DeMarco	WBC
2012-11-17	2014-01-27-Stripped	(United States) Adrien Broner	WBC
2014-01-27	2014-11-10-Stripped	(United States) Omar Figueroa Jr.	WBC
2014-12-30	2016-06-12	(Venezuela) Jorge Linares	WBC
2016-06-12	2017-01-28	(Montenegro) Dejan Zlatičanin	WBC
2017-01-28	2019-04-25-Vacated	(United States) Mikey Garcia	WBC
2019-08-31	2020-10-17	(Ukraine) Vasyl Lomachenko	WBC Franchise
2019-11-09	2023-08-01-Champion in recess	(United States) Devin Haney	WBC
2023-11-16	2026-02-04-Stripped	(United States) Shakur Stevenson	WBC
2026-08-01	Present	(Mexico) William Zepeda	WBC

== WBA ==
Reign began	Reign ended	Champion	Recognition
1962-04-21	1965-04-10	(Puerto Rico) Carlos Ortiz	WBA
1965-04-10	1965-11-13	(Panama) Ismael Laguna	WBA
1965-11-13	1968-06-29	(Puerto Rico) Carlos Ortiz	WBA
1968-06-29	1969-02-18	(Dominican Republic) Carlos Teo Cruz	WBA
1969-02-18	1970-03-03	(United States) Mando Ramos	WBA
1970-03-03	1970-09-26	(Panama) Ismael Laguna	WBA
1970-09-26	1972-06-26	(United Kingdom) Ken Buchanan	WBA
1972-06-26	1979-01-31	(Panama) Roberto Durán	WBA
1979-06-16	1980-03-02	(Venezuela) Ernesto España	WBA
1980-03-02	1981-04-12	(United States) Hilmer Kenty	WBA
1981-04-12	1981-04-12	(United States) Sean O'Grady	WBA
1981-09-12	1981-12-05	(Trinidad and Tobago) Claude Noel	WBA
1981-12-05	1982-05-08	(United States) Arturo Frias	WBA
1982-05-08	1984-06-01	(United States) Ray Mancini	WBA
1984-06-01	1986-09-26	(Saint Kitts and Nevis) Livingstone Bramble	WBA
1986-09-26	1987-11-21	(Puerto Rico) Edwin Rosario	WBA
1987-11-21	1988-10-29	(Mexico) Julio César Chávez	WBA
1989-07-09	1990-04-04	(Puerto Rico) Edwin Rosario	WBA
1990-04-04	1990-08-11	(Puerto Rico) Juan Nazario	WBA
1990-08-11	1991-10-05	(United States) Pernell Whitaker	WBA
1992-06-13	1992-10-24	(United States) Joey Gamache	WBA
1992-10-24	1993-06-26	(United States) Tony Lopez	WBA
1993-06-26	1993-10-30	(South Africa) Dingaan Thobela	WBA
1993-10-30	1998-05-16	(Kyrgyzstan) Orzubek Nazarov	WBA
1998-05-16	1999-04-10	(France) Jean Baptiste Mendy	WBA
1999-04-10	1999-08-07	(France) Julien Lorcy	WBA
1999-08-07	1999-11-13	(Italy) Stefano Zoff	WBA
1999-11-13	2000-06-11	(Venezuela) Gilberto Serrano	WBA
2000-06-11	2001-07-01	(Japan) Takanori Hatakeyama	WBA
2001-07-01	2001-10-08	(France) Julien Lorcy	WBA
2001-10-08	2002-01-05	(Argentina) Raul Horacio Balbi	WBA
2002-01-05	2003-05-17	(Romania) Leonard Doroftei	WBA
2004-04-10	2004-07-17	(Mongolia) Lakva Sim	WBA
2004-07-17	2008-03-08	(United States) Juan Díaz	WBA Super Champion
2007-12-29	2008-05-19	(Nicaragua) José Alfaro	WBA Regular Champion
2008-03-08	2009-01-10-Vacated	(United States) Nate Campbell	WBA Super Champion
2008-05-19	2009-01-03	(Japan) Yusuke Kobori	WBA Regular Champion
2009-01-03	2010-05-29	(Namibia) Paulus Moses	WBA Regular Champion
2009-02-28	2012-01-05-Stripped	(Mexico) Juan Manuel Márquez	WBA Super Champion
2010-05-29	2011-02-26	(Venezuela) Miguel Acosta	WBA Regular Champion
2011-02-26	2011-12-02-Stripped	(United States) Brandon Rios	WBA Regular Champion
2013-02-28	2015-04-09-Stripped	(Cuba) Richar Abril	WBA
2015-04-09	2015-11-21	(Colombia) Darleys Perez	WBA
2015-11-21	2016-09-25	(United Kingdom) Anthony Crolla	WBA
2016-09-25	2018-05-12	(Venezuela) Jorge Linares	WBA
2018-05-12	2020-10-17	(Ukraine) Vasyl Lomachenko	WBA
2020-10-17	2021-11-27	(United States) Teófimo López	WBA
2021-11-27	2022-06-05	(Australia) George Kambosos Jr.	WBA
2022-06-05	2023-11-29-Vacated	(United States) Devin Haney	WBA
2023-11-29	2026-01-16-Stripped	(United States) Gervonta Davis	WBA
2026-10-11	Present	(United States) Floyd Schofield	WBA

== IBF ==
Reign began	Reign ended	Champion	Recognition
1984-01-30	1984-04-15	(United States) Charlie Brown	IBF
1984-04-15	1985-04-06	(United States) Harry Arroyo	IBF
1985-04-06	1986-12-05	(United States) Jimmy Paul	IBF
1986-12-05	1987-06-07	(United States) Greg Haugen	IBF
1987-06-07	1988-02-06	(United States) Vinny Pazienza	IBF
1988-02-06	1989-02-18	(United States) Greg Haugen	IBF
1989-02-18	1992-Vacated	(United States) Pernell Whitaker	IBF
Pernell Whitaker becomes the undisputed champion of the lightweight division by winning the IBF title in February, 1989, and then defeating José Luis Ramírez for the vacant WBC title on August 20, 1989, and Juan Nazario for the WBA title on August 11, 1990.
1993-01-10	1994-02-19	(United States) Freddie Pendleton	IBF
1994-02-19	1995-05-06	(United States) Rafael Ruelas	IBF
1995-05-06	1995-07	(United States) Oscar De La Hoya	IBF
1995-08-19	1997-08-02	(Australia) Philip Holiday	IBF
1997-08-02	1999-04-17	(United States) Shane Mosley	IBF
1999-08-20	2003-06-Vacated	(United States) Paul Spadafora	IBF
2003-11-22	2004-05-13	(Mexico) Javier Jáuregui	IBF
2004-05-13	2005-03-01	(Mexico) Julio Díaz	IBF
2005-06-17	2005-09-17	(United States) Leavander Johnson	IBF
2005-09-17	2007-02-03	(Mexico) Jesús Chávez	IBF
2008-02-03	2007-10-19	(Mexico) Julio Díaz	IBF
2007-10-19	2008-03-08	(United States) Juan Díaz	IBF
2008-03-08	2009-02-13-Stripped	(United States) Nate Campbell	IBF
2010-08-14	2014-09-13	(Mexico) Miguel Vazquez	IBF
2014-09-13	2015-06-26-Vacated	(United States) Mickey Bey	IBF
2015-12-18	2016-06-03-Vacated	(Cuba) Rances Barthelemy	IBF
2018-07-28	2018-10-30-Vacated	(United States) Mikey Garcia	IBF
2019-02-02	2019-12-14	(Ghana) Richard Commey	IBF
2019-12-14	2021-11-27	(United States) Teófimo López	IBF
2021-11-27	2022-06-05	(Australia) George Kambosos Jr.	IBF
2022-06-05	2023-11-29-Vacated	(United States) Devin Haney	IBF
2024-05-12	2025-06-09-Vacated	(Ukraine) Vasyl Lomachenko	IBF
2025-06-09	Present	(United States) Raymond Muratalla	IBF

== WBO ==
Reign began	Reign ended	Champion	Recognition
1989-05-06	1990-09-22	(Mexico) Mauricio Aceves	WBO
1990-09-22	1991-09-14	(South Africa) Dingaan Thobela	WBO
1992-09-25	1994	(Italy) Giovanni Parisi	WBO
1994-07-29	1996	(United States) Oscar De La Hoya	WBO
1996-04-13	2004-01-03	(Uzbekistan) Artur Grigorian	WBO
2004-01-03	2004-08-07	(Brazil) Acelino Freitas	WBO
2004-08-07	2005	(United States) Diego Corrales	WBO
2006-04-29	2007-04-28	(Brazil) Acelino Freitas	WBO
2007-04-28	2008-03-08	(United States) Juan Díaz	WBO
2008-03-08	2009-02-13-Stripped	(United States) Nate Campbell	WBO
2010-02-28	2012-01-06-Stripped	(Mexico) Juan Manuel Márquez	WBO
2012-01-06	2014-03-01	(United Kingdom) Ricky Burns	WBO
2014-03-01	2015-03-24-Vacated	(United States) Terence Crawford	WBO
2015-07-11	2017-08-26-Vacated	(United Kingdom) Terry Flanagan	WBO
2018-02-16	2018-08-25	(Mexico) Ray Beltrán	WBO
2018-08-25	2018-12-08	(Puerto Rico) Jose Pedraza	WBO
2018-12-08	2020-10-17	(Ukraine) Vasyl Lomachenko	WBO
2020-10-17	2021-11-27	(United States) Teófimo López	WBO
2021-11-27	2022-06-05	(Australia) George Kambosos Jr.	WBO
2022-06-05	2023-11-29-Vacated	(United States) Devin Haney	WBO
2024-05-18	2025-02-14	(Ukraine) Denys Berinchyk	WBO
2025-02-14	2025-06-06-Stripped	(United States) Keyshawn Davis	WBO
2025-11-22	Present	(United States) Abdullah Mason	WBO

== See also ==
- List of British world boxing champions
