= Maurice Cullen (boxer) =

English lightweight boxer

Personal information
- Nationality: British
- Born: Maurice Cullen; 30 December 1937 Wheatley Hill, County Durham, England
- Died: November 2001 County Durham, England
- Weight: Lightweight

Boxing career
- Stance: Orthodox

Boxing record
- Total fights: 55
- Wins: 45
- Win by KO: 10
- Losses: 8
- Draws: 2

Maurice Cullen (30 December 1937 – November 2001) was an English lightweight boxer, who held the British Lightweight Title, defending it four times.

== Boxing style ==
Cullen had a style that very much centred round his left jab. He had problems with his right hand during his early amateur days and this made him depend more on his left hand. He had large reserves of stamina due to an abnormally slow heart rate, known as bradycardia, and he would use his left jab to score points whilst using his mobility to keep away from his opponent's punches. This did not always lead to an attractive contest earning him the nickname the one armed bandit, and Cullen was not as popular outside his native North-East as his talent would seem to merit.

== Early life ==
He grew up in Wheatley Hill, County Durham, beginning work as an apprentice pipe fitter at the local colliery. He later move to nearby Shotton. He fought in National Coal Board boxing championships winning the featherweight title and later the lightweight title.

In 1959 he turned professional with his brother Terry as his manager. In his first professional fight, in November 1959 against Ricky Mcmasters, he won on points over six rounds.

For the next three years Cullen built up a record of 24 wins, 2 defeats and 2 draws. Of his wins in this period only one was by knockout and four by technical knockout.

== Title challenge ==
Cullen's record put him in line for a title challenge against the British lightweight champion, Dave Charnley. Charnley was a southpaw, who had held the British title since 1957, and had twice unsuccessfully fought for the world title. The fight took place on 20 May 1963 at Belle Vue, Manchester, and Charnley retained his title after fifteen rounds with a points decision. Cullen reportedly did not like fighting southpaws, but pushed Charnley all the way.

In October of the same year Carlos Ortiz, the Puerto Rican world lightweight champion, came to England for a ten-round non-title fight against Cullen at the Empire Pool, Wembley. Although Cullen was knocked down in the last round he hung on to lose on points, having given the world champion a hard fight.

== British champion ==
In the meantime, Dave Charnley, had moved up to welterweight and finally retired in December 1964, leaving the British lightweight title vacant. Following his defeat to Carlos Ortiz, Cullen had had three successive victories, and so was in a good position to contest the vacant championship. He fought the Liverpudlian Dave Coventry at Liverpool Stadium in April 1965. Cullen spent fifteen rounds back-pedalling and poking his left jab into Coventy's face without his opponent being able to do anything about it. This incensed some of the home crowd, who made their feeling clear, but Cullen easily gained the decision and became the new British lightweight champion.

Cullen fought two more bouts, gaining points victories before defending his title against Vic Andreeti, the Hoxton fighter whom he had beaten twice already. The bout was in November 1965 at Wolverhampton, and Cullen gained another fifteen-round points decision, although Andreeti and some of his supporters thought that he should have been given the decision.

Cullen then fought two more bouts, winning them both, before defending his title against Terry Edwards, a boxer with a less than impressive record. The bout was held in June 1966 at the New St James Hall, Newcastle upon Tyne. The hall was only half full, but those present witnessed Cullen winning by a technical knockout in the fifth round from a right-hand punch. With this victory Cullen won the Lonsdale Belt outright.

Cullen fought three more fights, winning two and losing the third to American Lloyd Marshall by a ninth-round knockout. He then defended his title for the third time, in a rematch against Vic Andreeti. The bout was in April 1967 at the New St James Hall, Newcastle upon Tyne. Cullen again won on points over fifteen rounds in front of a packed hall, despite a late scare due to a cut near his eye.

Cullen fought and won two more bouts, one in Helsinki, Finland and the other in Madison Square Garden, New York City. He then defended his title for the fourth time, against Ken Buchanan, a 22-year-old Scot with twenty-three straight wins to his name. The bout was in February 1968 at the Hilton Hotel, Mayfair, London. Buchanan fought a fast, aggressive fight forcing Cullen to back-pedal. He caught Cullen with a number of solid punches, putting him down twice in the sixth and twice more in the ninth. He finally caught Cullen with a flurry of punches as he started to tire in the eleventh, and after going down, Cullen was unable to beat the count. He had been replaced as champion by a boxer who would go on to be world champion. Cullen had retained the British title for nearly three years.

Cullen carried on fighting for two more years, and had seven more bouts, including a defeat in São Paulo, Brazil, and a victory and a defeat in Copenhagen, Denmark. He fought his last bout on 14 January 1970 against Victor Paul, in Solihull. As usual he won on points.

== Retirement ==
After retiring from boxing, Cullen worked in a chemical factory in Hartlepool and then became a milkman before retiring completely. In retirement he continued to keep fit, but in 1998 he collapsed while out running. He had a quadruple heart bypass operation to correct a congenital defect. He appeared to return to full fitness following his surgery, but in November 2001 he died of a heart attack.

== See also ==
- List of British lightweight boxing champions

== Sources ==
- Ken Buchanan – Lightweight Champion of the World – Ken Buchanan site with detailed bio, statistics, full fights and more
- Boxing record for Maurice Cullen from BoxRec (registration required)
- Ronnie Wharton (2005), ‘'Fighting Men of the North'’, Tempus Publishing Limited, ISBN 0-7524-3551-5
- Obituary: http://archive.thenorthernecho.co.uk/2001/12/4/152480.html
