= Frankie Narvaez =

Puerto Rican boxer

Frankie Narvaez (December 3, 1939 – April 15, 2004) was a Puerto Rican lightweight boxer from Caguas, Puerto Rico. His record was 39 wins (seven by knockout), 11 losses (one by knockout) and one draw. He beat world champions Carlos Cruz, Chango Carmona and Pedro Adigue, and lost to Panamanians Ismael Laguna and Antonio Amaya, among others.

He died in Hartford, Connecticut at the age of 64.
