= Johnny LoBianco =

American boxer

Giovanni "Johnny" LoBianco (October 7, 1915 – July 16, 2001) was an American boxing referee for over 30 years, who was referee for a number of championship fights, including several that ended controversially, most notably Roberto Durán's successful 1972 dethroning of Ken Buchanan in which LoBianco ruled Durán the victor by knockout despite having appeared to have hit Buchanan with a low blow.

Born in Sicily on October 7, 1915, LoBianco immigrated to the United States as a five-year-old and was raised in Corona, Queens. LoBianco took over his father's barber shop on Delancey Street at age 15 after his father's death. He started boxing in his teens, cutting hair during the day and fighting at night, and ended up winning 52 of his 54 professional bouts as a lightweight boxer. He became a boxing referee in 1954, and otherwise worked as a liquor salesman, continuing his boxing role until 1986.

Among the other championship fights LoBianco refereed were the 1965 fight in which José Torres won the light heavyweight title from Willie Pastrano, the March 1967 bout between Muhammad Ali and Zora Folley and Nino Benvenuti's March 1968 fight in which he regained the middleweight title from Emile Griffith.

LoBianco was best known for his role as referee in Roberto Durán's June 26, 1972, match with Ken Buchanan at Madison Square Garden for the world lightweight championship. Durán was ahead on all three cards at the end of the 13th round, at which time the fighters spent an additional 20 seconds punching each other. Buchanan was knocked down writhing in pain from a groin injury, that Buchanan's trainer, Gil Clancy, said was caused by a knee to the groin. LoBianco awarded the fight to Durán, insisting that the blow that took down Buchanan was "in the abdomen, not any lower" and that he felt that Buchanan would be unable to continue fighting. Columnist Red Smith of The New York Times wrote that LoBianco had to award the victory to Durán, even if the punch was a low blow, as "anything short of pulling a knife is regarded indulgently" in American boxing.

LoBianco died at age 85 at Southampton Hospital on July 16, 2001, due to congestive heart failure.
