= Carlos Ortiz (boxer) =

Puerto Rican boxer (1936–2022)

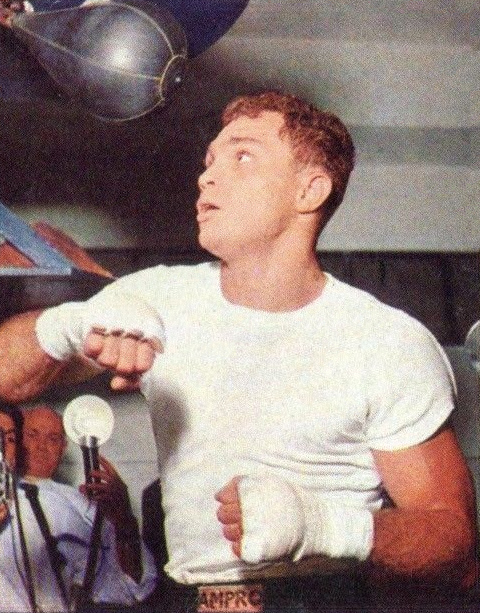
- Ortiz c. 1966

Personal information
- Nationality: Puerto Rican
- Born: 9 September 1936 Ponce, Puerto Rico
- Died: 13 June 2022 (aged 85) New York City, New York, U.S.
- Height: 5 ft 7 in (170 cm)
- Weight: Lightweight; Light welterweight

Boxing career
- Reach: 70 in (178 cm)
- Stance: Orthodox

Boxing record
- Total fights: 70
- Wins: 61
- Win by KO: 30
- Losses: 7
- Draws: 1
- No contests: 1

External audio
- You may hear Carlos Ortiz vs Kenny Lane II on YouTube

Carlos Ortiz (9 September 1936 – 13 June 2022) was a Puerto Rican professional boxer. He held world titles in lightweight and light welterweight weight divisions. Along with Félix Trinidad, Miguel Cotto, Wilfredo Gómez, Héctor Camacho, José Torres, Edwin Rosario and Wilfred Benítez, Ortiz is considered among the best Puerto Rican boxers of all time by sports journalists and analysts. As of January 2018, Ortiz holds the record for the most wins in unified lightweight title bouts in boxing history at 10.

In 1991, Ortiz was inducted into the International Boxing Hall of Fame. In 2002, Ortiz was voted by The Ring magazine as the 60th greatest fighter of the last 80 years. He held 21st place in BoxRec ranking of the greatest pound for pound boxers of all time.

== Boxing career ==
Ortiz, born in Ponce, started his professional career in 1955 with a first round knockout of Harry Bell in New York City. He moved from Puerto Rico to New York before he began boxing as a professional, he would campaign there during the first stages of his career. After 9 bouts there, he fought outside New York for the first time, moving to Massachusetts to knock Al Duarte out in 4 rounds. His next 3 bouts were also outside New York, but he stayed within the confines of New England, as they happened, once again in Massachusetts, and in New Jersey.

He returned to New York again and won 4 more bouts in a row, then made his California debut, beating Mickey Northrup by a decision in 10 rounds. 2 more fights in California and one in New York went by, after which he returned to California to meet Lou Filippo, who was subsequently inducted into the International Boxing Hall of Fame as a referee. The first time, it was declared a no-contest after 9 rounds, but in the second, Carlos prevailed, by a knockout in 9. 5 more wins followed, and then he met Johnny Busso, who handed Carlos his first loss, on a 10-round decision. That fight was held in New York, and in an immediate rematch between Ortiz and Busso, Carlos won, also by a 10-round decision, and also in New York.

Next Carlos flew to England to meet Dave Charnley, who was considered one of the top challengers of that time. Ortiz won the fight at Harringay Arena on a 10-round decision, after which promoters thought he was ready for a world title try.

=== Junior welterweight world champion ===
Carlos met Kenny Lane for the vacant world Jr. Welterweight title, in New York on the night of 12 June 1959. Lane had handed Carlos his second loss months before, winning a 10-round decision over Ortiz in Florida. This time, Carlos became the World's Jr Welterweight champion, with a TKO of Lane at the end of 2nd round. Ortiz became the first Puerto Rican world boxing champion since Sixto Escobar more than 30 years before, and only the second Puerto Rican world boxing champion ever. Unfortunately for him, not much importance was being given to that division at the time, since that division's title had been vacant for 13 years. But Carlos defended his title twice, knocking out the respected, until then undefeated Mexican puncher Battling Torres in Torres' home ground of Los Angeles, and beating Duilio Loi in 15 rounds by decision at San Francisco.

His next fight was a rematch with Loi, and it took Ortiz to Milan, Italy to defend his crown. This time, it was Loi's turn to become a world champion, winning by a 15-round decision.

After another win, Ortiz traveled to Milan once again, and met Loi in a rubber match. This time, he lost again, by 15-round decision.

=== Lightweight world champion ===
Instead of going up in weight, like most boxers throughout history have done after losing the title in their original division, Ortiz went down in weight, and challenged world champion Joe Brown (also a member of the International Boxing Hall of Fame). Ortiz won a 15-round decision over Brown on 21 April 1962 in Las Vegas, to win his second world title, this time in his second championship division. Ortiz defended with a 5-round knockout of Teruo Kosaka in Tokyo before making his Puerto Rican debut, with a 13-round knockout win over Doug Valiant to retain his title on 7 April 1963 in San Juan.

A knockout win in 14 rounds over another Hall of Famer, Gabriel Elorde, Flash in the Philippines followed, and then a rematch with Lane, this time Ortiz retaining his world Lightweight title with a 15-round decision in San Juan. But in 1965 he went to Panama and fought yet another member of the International Boxing Hall of Fame, Ismael Laguna who defeated him in 15 rounds to claim Ortiz's world Lightweight title. A rematch in San Juan followed, and Ortiz regained the world Lightweight title beating Laguna by a 15-round decision also.

1966 saw Ortiz draw with world Jr Welterweight champion Nicolino Locche in a ten-round non-title affair in Argentina, and retain his title vs Johnny Bizarro (KO in 12 in Pittsburgh), Cuban Sugar Ramos (another International Boxing Hall of Fame Member, KO in 5 rounds in Mexico City), and Filipino Flash Elorde, also by KO in 14 at a New York rematch. The Ramos fight proved controversial, because the WBC's president proclaimed at first that the punch with which Ortiz had beaten Ramos had been illegal, but he later reconsidered and gave Ortiz the title, and the knockout victory, back, with the condition that a rematch be fought in the future.

And so 1967 came, and Ortiz and Ramos met once again, this time in San Juan. Ortiz retained the title by a knockout in 4 rounds, and this time the bout went without any controversies. Then, he and Laguna fought a third time, and Ortiz retained his title by a 15-round decision in New York.

=== Later career ===
29 June 1968 proved to be Ortiz's last day as a world champion, as he lost his world lightweight title to Dominican Carlos Cruz on a 15-round decision in the Dominican Republic. Ortiz kept on fighting, but he never got another chance at a world title. He retired after losing at Madison Square Garden by a knockout in 6 rounds to Ken Buchanan. It was the only time he was stopped in his career. His final record was of 61 wins, 7 losses and 1 draw, with one bout declared a no-contest and 30 knockout wins.

Ortiz is also a member of the International Boxing Hall of Fame and he always enjoyed taking photos with his fans and signing autographs for them.

== Death ==
Carlos Ortiz died on 13 June 2022, in New York at age 85.

== Professional boxing record ==
70 fights	61 wins	7 losses
By knockout	30	1
By decision	31	6
Draws	1	
No contests	1	

No.	Result	Record	Opponent	Type	Round	Date	Location	Notes
70	Loss	61–7–1 (1)	Ken Buchanan	RTD	6 (10)	20 Sep 1972	Madison Square Garden, New York City, New York, U.S.	
69	Win	61–6–1 (1)	Johnny Copeland	KO	3 (10)	1 Aug 1972	Oklahoma City, Oklahoma, U.S.	
68	Win	60–6–1 (1)	Gerardo Ferrat	TKO	3 (10)	3 Jun 1972	International Amphitheatre, Chicago, Illinois, U.S.	
67	Win	59–6–1 (1)	Greg Potter	UD	10	1 May 1972	Inglewood Forum, Inglewood, California, U.S.	
66	Win	58–6–1 (1)	Junior Varney	TKO	7 (10)	20 Mar 1972	Ponce, Puerto Rico	
65	Win	57–6–1 (1)	Leo DiFiore	KO	2 (10)	19 Feb 1972	Hiram Bithorn Stadium, San Juan, Puerto Rico	
64	Win	56–6–1 (1)	Ivelaw Eastman	TKO	2 (10)	31 Jan 1972	Waltham, Massachusetts, U.S.	
63	Win	55–6–1 (1)	Terry Rondeau	TKO	4 (10)	20 Jan 1972	Exposition Building, Portland, Maine, U.S.	
62	Win	54–6–1 (1)	Bill Whittenburg	KO	7 (10)	8 Jan 1972	Coconut Grove Convention Center, Coconut Grove, Florida, U.S.	
61	Win	53–6–1 (1)	Jimmy Ligons	TKO	3 (10)	1 Dec 1971	Silver Slipper, Las Vegas, Nevada, U.S.	
60	Win	52–6–1 (1)	Edmundo Leite	MD	10	21 Nov 1969	Madison Square Garden, New York City, New York, U.S.	
59	Loss	51–6–1 (1)	Carlos Teo Cruz	SD	15	29 Jun 1968	Estadio Quisqueya, Santo Domingo, Dominican Republic	Lost WBA, WBC and The Ring lightweight titles
58	Win	51–5–1 (1)	Ismael Laguna	UD	15	16 Aug 1967	Shea Stadium, New York City, New York, U.S.	Retained WBA, WBC and The Ring lightweight titles
57	Win	50–5–1 (1)	Sugar Ramos	TKO	4 (15)	1 Jul 1967	Hiram Bithorn Stadium, San Juan, Puerto Rico	Retained WBA and The Ring lightweight titles Won vacant WBC lightweight title
56	Win	49–5–1 (1)	Flash Elorde	TKO	14 (15)	28 Nov 1966	Madison Square Garden, New York City, New York, U.S.	Retained WBA and The Ring lightweight titles
55	Win	48–5–1 (1)	Sugar Ramos	TKO	5 (15)	22 Oct 1966	El Toreo, Mexico City, Distrito Federal, Mexico	Retained WBA, WBC, and The Ring lightweight titles
54	Win	47–5–1 (1)	Johnny Bizzarro	TKO	12 (15)	20 Jun 1966	Pittsburgh Civic Arena, Pittsburgh, Pennsylvania, U.S.	Retained WBA, WBC, and The Ring lightweight titles
53	Draw	46–5–1 (1)	Nicolino Locche	MD	10	7 Apr 1966	Estadio Luna Park, Buenos Aires, Argentina	
52	Win	46–5 (1)	Ismael Laguna	UD	15	13 Nov 1965	Hiram Bithorn Stadium, San Juan, Puerto Rico	Won WBA, WBC, and The Ring lightweight titles
51	Loss	45–5 (1)	Ismael Laguna	MD	15	10 Apr 1965	Estadio Nacional de Panamá, Panama City, Panama	Lost WBA, WBC, and The Ring lightweight titles
50	Win	45–4 (1)	Dick Divola	TKO	1 (10)	14 Dec 1964	Boston Garden, Boston, Massachusetts, U.S.	
49	Win	44–4 (1)	Kenny Lane	UD	15	11 Apr 1964	Hiram Bithorn Stadium, San Juan, Puerto Rico	Retained WBA, WBC, and The Ring lightweight titles
48	Win	43–4 (1)	Flash Elorde	TKO	14 (15)	15 Feb 1964	Rizal Memorial Sports Complex, Manila, Metro Manila, Philippines	Retained WBA, WBC, and The Ring lightweight titles
47	Win	42–4 (1)	Maurice Cullen	PTS	10	22 Oct 1963	Empire Pool, Wembley, London, England, U.K.	
46	Win	41–4 (1)	Pete Acera	TKO	7 (10)	18 Sep 1963	Honolulu, Hawaii, U.S.	
45	Win	40–4 (1)	Doug Vaillant	TKO	13 (15)	7 Apr 1963	Hiram Bithorn Stadium, San Juan, Puerto Rico	Retained WBA and The Ring lightweight titles; Won inaugural WBC lightweight title
44	Win	39–4 (1)	Teruo Kosaka	KO	5 (15)	3 Dec 1962	Kokugikan, Tokyo, Japan	Retained NYSAC, WBA, and The Ring lightweight titles
43	Win	38–4 (1)	Kazuo Takayama	UD	10	7 Nov 1962	Korakuen Hall, Tokyo, Japan	
42	Win	37–4 (1)	Arthur Persley	UD	10	1 Aug 1962	Araneta Coliseum, Quezon City, Metro Manila, Philippines	
41	Win	36–4 (1)	Joe Brown	UD	15	21 Apr 1962	Las Vegas Convention Center, Las Vegas, Nevada, U.S.	Won NYSAC, NBA, and The Ring lightweight titles
40	Win	35–4 (1)	Paolo Rosi	UD	10	18 Nov 1961	Madison Square Garden, New York City, New York, U.S.	
39	Win	34–4 (1)	Doug Vaillant	UD	10	2 Sep 1961	Miami Beach Convention Center, Miami Beach, Florida, U.S.	
38	Loss	33–4 (1)	Duilio Loi	UD	15	10 May 1961	San Siro, Milan, Lombarida, Italy	For NYSAC and NBA light welterweight titles
37	Win	33–3 (1)	Cisco Andrade	UD	10	2 Feb 1961	Olympic Auditorium, Los Angeles, California, U.S.	
36	Loss	32–3 (1)	Duilio Loi	MD	15	1 Sep 1960	San Siro, Milan, Lombardio, Italy	Lost NYSAC and NBA light welterweight titles
35	Win	32–2 (1)	Duilio Loi	SD	15	15 Jun 1960	Cow Palace, San Francisco, California	Retained NYSAC and NBA light welterweight titles
34	Win	31–2 (1)	Battling Torres	KO	10 (15)	4 Feb 1960	Memorial Coliseum, Los Angeles, California, U.S.	Retained NYSAC and NBA light welterweight titles
33	Win	30–2 (1)	Kenny Lane	TKO	2 (15)	12 Jun 1959	Madison Square Garden, New York City, New York, U.S.	Won vacant NYSAC and NBA light welterweight titles
32	Win	29–2 (1)	Len Matthews	TKO	6 (10)	13 Apr 1959	Philadelphia Arena, Philadelphia, Pennsylvania, U.S.	
31	Loss	28–2 (1)	Kenny Lane	MD	10	31 Dec 1958	Miami Beach Convention Center, Miami Beach, Florida, U.S.	
30	Win	28–1 (1)	Dave Charnley	PTS	10	28 Oct 1958	Harringay Arena, Harringay, London, England, U.K.	
29	Win	27–1 (1)	Johnny Busso	UD	10	19 Sep 1958	Madison Square Garden, New York City, New York, U.S.	
28	Loss	26–1 (1)	Johnny Busso	SD	10	27 Jun 1958	Madison Square Garden, New York City, New York, U.S.	
27	Win	26–0 (1)	Joey Lopes	UD	10	9 May 1958	Legion Stadium, Hollywood, California, U.S.	
26	Win	25–0 (1)	Tommy Tibbs	UD	10	28 Feb 1958	Madison Square Garden, New York City, New York, U.S.	
25	Win	24–0 (1)	Harry Bell	UD	10	23 Sep 1957	St. Nicholas Arena, New York City, New York, U.S.	
24	Win	23–0 (1)	Felix Chiocca	UD	10	29 May 1957	Chicago Stadium, Chicago, Illinois, U.S.	
23	Win	22–0 (1)	Ike Vaughn	UD	10	7 May 1957	Miami Beach Convention Center, Miami Beach, Florida, U.S.	
22	Win	21–0 (1)	Lou Filippo	TKO	7 (10)	9 Apr 1957	Legion Stadium, Hollywood, California, U.S.	
21	NC	20–0 (1)	Lou Filippo	ND	9 (10)	2 Mar 1957	Legion Stadium, Hollywood, California, U.S.	
20	Win	20–0	Bobby Rogers	UD	10	23 Jan 1957	Chicago Stadium, Chicago, Illinois, U.S.	
19	Win	19–0	Gale Kerwin	UD	10	31 Dec 1956	St. Nicholas Arena, New York City, New York, U.S.	
18	Win	18–0	Philip Kim	TKO	9 (10)	15 Dec 1956	Legion Stadium, Hollywood, California, U.S.	
17	Win	17–0	Mickey Northrup	UD	10	27 Oct 1956	Legion Stadium, Hollywood, California, U.S.	
16	Win	16–0	Tommy Salem	SD	10	30 Jul 1956	St. Nicholas Arena, New York City, New York, U.S.	
15	Win	15–0	Tommy Salem	PTS	6	25 May 1956	Madison Square Garden, New York City, New York, U.S.	
14	Win	14–0	Ray Portilla	PTS	8	17 Feb 1956	Madison Square Garden, New York City, New York, U.S.	
13	Win	13–0	Ray Portilla	UD	8	9 Jan 1956	St. Nicholas Arena, New York City, New York, U.S.	
12	Win	12–0	Charley Titone	TKO	2 (8)	10 Dec 1955	Armory, Paterson, New Jersey, U.S.	
11	Win	11–0	Lem Miller	PTS	8	12 Nov 1955	Arena, Boston, Massachusetts, U.S.	
10	Win	10–0	Al Duarte	TKO	4 (6)	29 Oct 1955	Arena, Boston, Massachusetts, U.S.	
9	Win	9–0	Leroy Graham	KO	2 (6)	3 Oct 1955	St. Nicholas Arena, New York City, New York, U.S.	
8	Win	8–0	Hector Rodriguez	KO	2 (6)	19 Sep 1955	St. Nicholas Arena, New York City, New York, U.S.	
7	Win	7–0	Armand Bush	PTS	6	22 Aug 1955	St. Nicholas Arena, New York City, New York, U.S.	
6	Win	6–0	Tony DeCola	PTS	6	10 Aug 1955	Madison Square Garden, New York City, New York, U.S.	
5	Win	5–0	Jimmy DeMura	PTS	6	24 Jun 1955	War Memorial Auditorium, Syracuse, New York, U.S.	
4	Win	4–0	Juan Pacheco	KO	2 (4)	30 May 1955	St. Nicholas Arena, New York City, New York, U.S.	
3	Win	3–0	Danny Roberts	KO	3 (4)	13 May 1955	Madison Square Garden, New York City, New York, U.S.	
2	Win	2–0	Morris Hodnett	TKO	1 (4)	28 Feb 1955	St. Nicholas Arena, New York City, New York, U.S.	
1	Win	1–0	Harry Bell	KO	1 (4)	14 Feb 1955	St. Nicholas Arena, New York City, New York, U.S.	

== Titles in boxing ==
=== Major world titles ===
- NYSAC lightweight champion (135 lbs)
- NBA (WBA) lightweight champion (135 lbs) (2×)
- WBC lightweight champion (Note: Inaugural champion.) (135 lbs) (3×)
- NYSAC light welterweight champion (140 lbs)
- NBA (WBA) light welterweight champion (140 lbs)

=== The Ring magazine titles ===
- The Ring lightweight champion (135 lbs) (2×)

=== Undisputed titles ===
- Undisputed lightweight champion (3×)
- Undisputed light welterweight champion

== Legacy ==
He is recognized at Ponce's Parque de los Ponceños Ilustres in the area of sports.

== See also ==
- Lineal championship
- List of lightweight boxing champions
- List of light welterweight boxing champions
- List of WBA world champions
- List of WBC world champions
- List of undisputed boxing champions
- List of Puerto Rican boxing world champions
- List of Puerto Ricans
- Sports in Puerto Rico

== Notes and references ==
=== References ===
Sporting positions
World boxing titles
Preceded by Tippy Larkin	NYSAC light welterweight champion 12 June 1959 – 1 September 1960	Succeeded by Duilio Loi
Preceded by Johnny Jadick	NBA light welterweight champion 12 June 1959 – 1 September 1960	Succeeded by Duilio Loi
Inaugural	Undisputed light welterweight champion 12 June 1959 – 1 September 1960	Succeeded by Duilio Loi
Preceded by Joe Brown	NYSAC lightweight champion 21 August 1962 – 7 April 1963; Won inaugural WBC title	Title discontinued
Preceded by Joe Brown	NBA lightweight champion 21 August 1962 – 20 April 1965; Became WBA in 1962	Succeeded by Ismael Laguna
Preceded by Joe Brown	The Ring lightweight champion 21 August 1962 – 20 April 1965	Succeeded by Ismael Laguna
Preceded by Joe Brown	Undisputed lightweight champion 21 August 1962 – 20 April 1965	Succeeded by Ismael Laguna
Inaugural	WBC lightweight champion 7 April 1963 – 20 April 1965	Succeeded by Ismael Laguna
Preceded by Ismael Laguna	WBA lightweight champion 13 November 1965 – 29 June 1968	Succeeded by Carlos Cruz
Preceded by Ismael Laguna	WBC lightweight champion 13 November 1965 – 25 October 1966; Stripped	Vacant Title next held by Himself
Preceded by Ismael Laguna	The Ring lightweight champion 13 November 1965 – 29 June 1968	Succeeded by Carlos Cruz
Preceded by Ismael Laguna	Undisputed lightweight champion 13 November 1965 – 25 October 1966; Titles fragmented	Vacant Title next held by Himself
Vacant Title last held by Himself	WBC lightweight champion 1 July 1967 – 29 June 1968	Succeeded by Carlos Cruz
Vacant Title last held by Himself	Undisputed lightweight champion 1 July 1967 – 29 June 1968	Succeeded by Carlos Cruz
