= Percy Hayles =

Jamaican boxer (1940–1978)

Personal information
- Born: Percival Hayles; 24 October 1940 Colony of Jamaica, British Empire
- Died: 28 August 1978 (aged 37) near Kingston, Jamaica
- Weight: light/light welter/welterweight

Boxing career

Boxing record
- Total fights: 70
- Wins: 34 (KO 11)
- Losses: 30 (KO 9)
- Draws: 6

Percival Hayles (24 October 1940 – 28 August 1978) was a Jamaican professional light/light welter/welterweight boxer of the 1950s, '60s and '70s who won the British Commonwealth lightweight title, and was a challenger for the Jamaican lightweight title against Bunny Grant, and World Boxing Council (WBC) light welterweight title and World Boxing Association (WBA) World light welterweight title against Carlos "Morocho" Enrique Hernandez Ramos, his professional fighting weight varied from 132 lb (60 kg; 9 st 6 lb), i.e. lightweight to 142 lb (64 kg; 10 st 2 lb), i.e. welterweight. He was the 1964 Men's Winner of the Jamaica Sportsperson of the year. He was killed when he was hit by a motorist while riding a bicycle near Kingston, Jamaica.
