= Kobler =

Kobler is a surname. Notable people with the surname include:

- Andreas Kobler (1816–1892), German historian
- Daniel Köbler (born 1981), German politician
- Erich Kobler, German film editor and director
- Flurina Kobler, Swiss curler
- Martin Kobler (born 1953), German diplomat
- Robert Köbler (1912–1970), German organist

== See also ==
- Kobler Field, airfield in the Northern Mariana Islands
- Koblerville, settlement on the island of Saipan in the Northern Mariana Islands
- Köbler v Republik Österreich, 2003 EU lawsuit
