= Pauke =

Pauke is both a given name and a surname. Notable people with the name include:

- Pauke Meijers (1934–2013), Dutch football player
- Pauke Siaka (born 1986), Papua New Guinean cricketer
- Florian Baucke (also Pauke; 1719–1779), Silesian and Bohemian Jesuit missionary

== See also ==
- Baucke
- Bauke
