= Sport in Colombia =

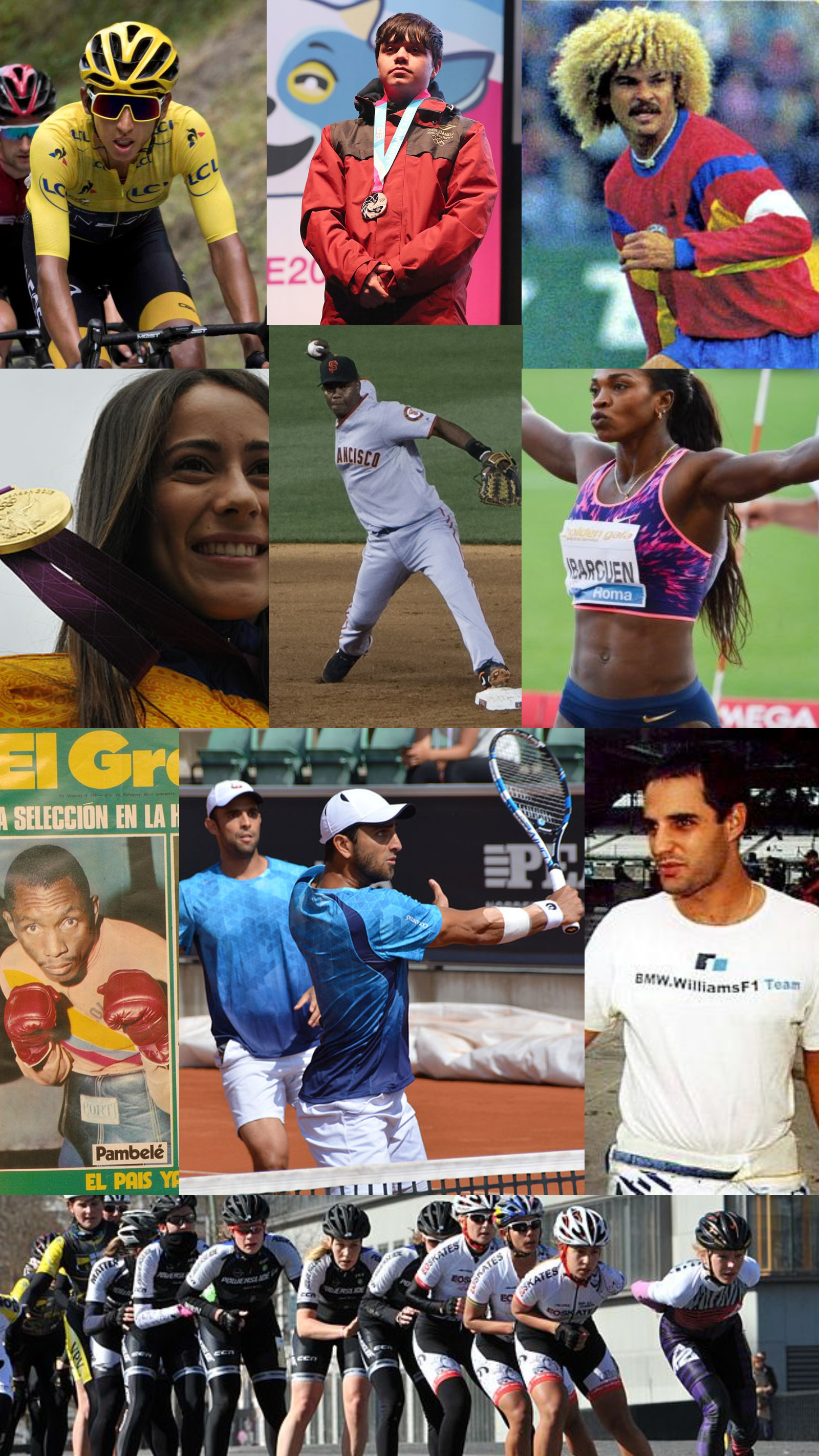
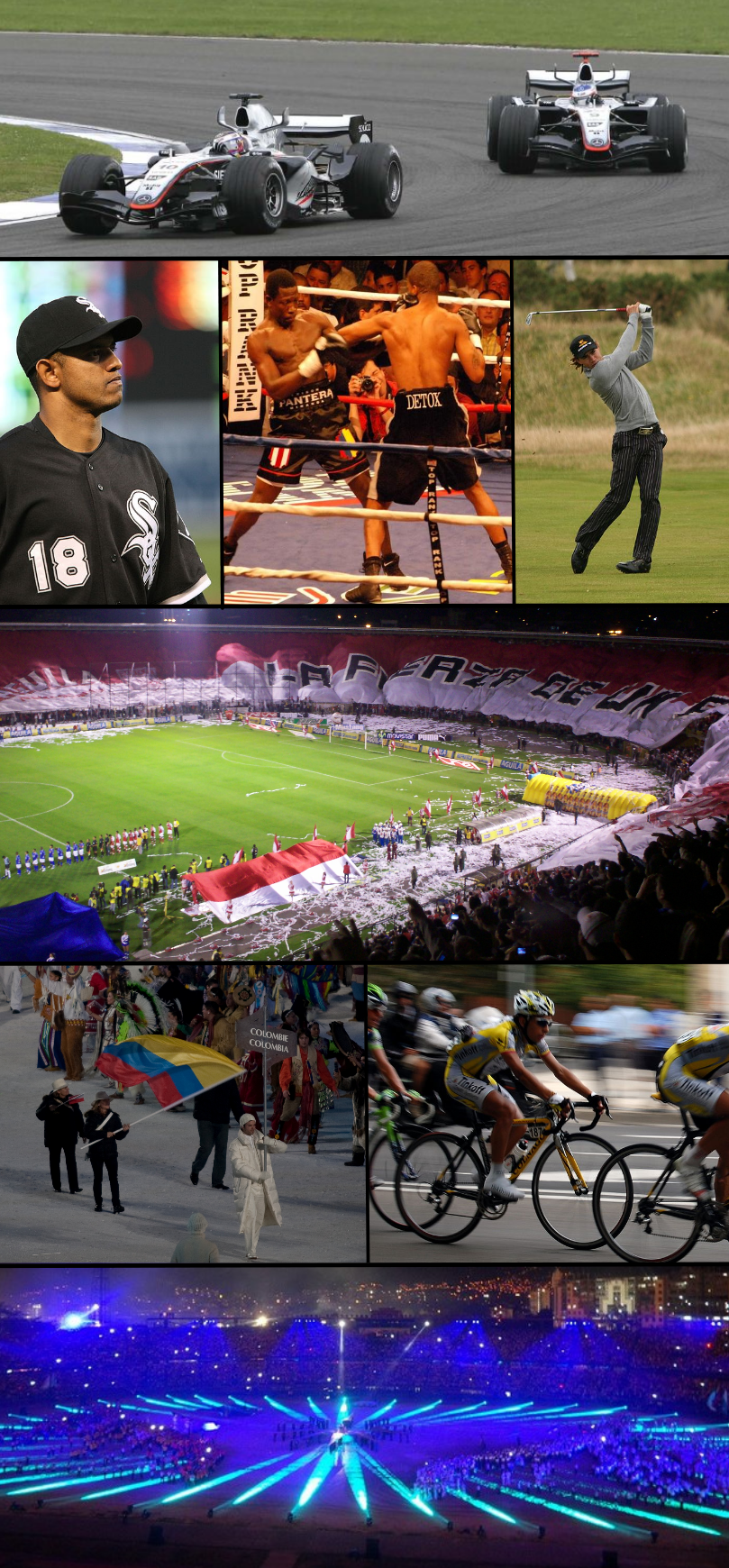
Sport in Colombia

Sports in Colombia includes professional sports leagues, as well as amateur leagues for numerous sports. Football, cycling, baseball, and roller skating are the most popular sports in Colombia. The Government of Colombia sponsors numerous individuals and teams nationally and internationally through the Ministry of Sports to enable sportspeople to represent Colombia in competition. The achievements of professional sportspeople are a source of national pride for Colombians.

== Football ==
The Colombian Football Federation was founded in 1924 and has been associated with FIFA and CONMEBOL since 1936. Colombia's national team participated in a FIFA World Cup in 1962, followed by others in 1990, 1994, 1998, 2014, 2018 and 2026. Its best presentation was in 2014, when the team reached the quarter-finals and James Rodríguez became top scorer of the tournament. The only "olympic goal" (a goal made directly from one corner shot) in the World Cup was scored for Colombia by Marcos Coll, beating legendary goalkeeper Lev Yashin in a 4–4 draw with the Soviet Union in 1962. A golden era existed for the national team from the mid-1980s towards the late 1990s when it became one of the most powerful teams in football, with a generation of talented players such as Carlos Valderrama, Andrés Escobar, René Higuita and Faustino Asprilla. Colombia was the champion of the 2001 Copa América, which they hosted and set a new record of being undefeated, conceding no goals and winning each match. Prior to that success, they were runners-up to Peru in the 1975 Copa América. Colombia was the first team to win FIFA best mover in 1993 where the achievement was first introduced (with some help from their famous 5-0 thrashing of South American powerhouse Argentina at the qualifiers for the 1994 FIFA World Cup) and the second team after Croatia to win it twice, with the second being in 2013. Colombia also hosted the 2011 FIFA U-20 World Cup and is to host the 2016 FIFA Futsal World Cup. Colombia was organized to host the 2020 Copa América with Argentina. However, on May 20, 2020, Colombia was removed due to the 2021 Colombian protests, and Argentina was later removed due to COVID-19 issues. Brazil became the host for the cup. The nation also qualified for the 1968, 1972, 1980, and 1992 Summer Olympics. Throughout the years, many Colombians have also worked for leagues in other nations. The national clubs compete in the Categoría Primera A, which also participates in international tournaments like Copa Libertadores de América upon winning or finishing in the first places. In club football, Atlético Nacional became the first Colombian club team to win the Copa Libertadores in 1989 and later in 2016. Once Caldas were the surprise winners of the 2004 Copa Libertadores and the second Colombian team to do so.

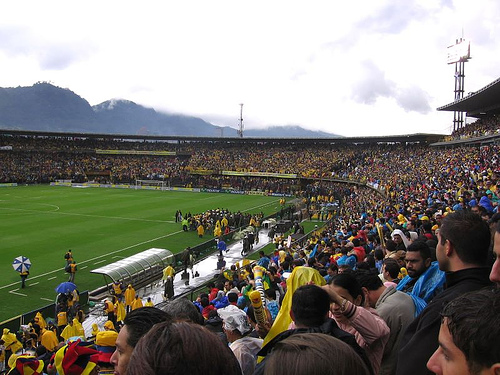
The Colombia national football team against Brazil in Bogotá, Colombia

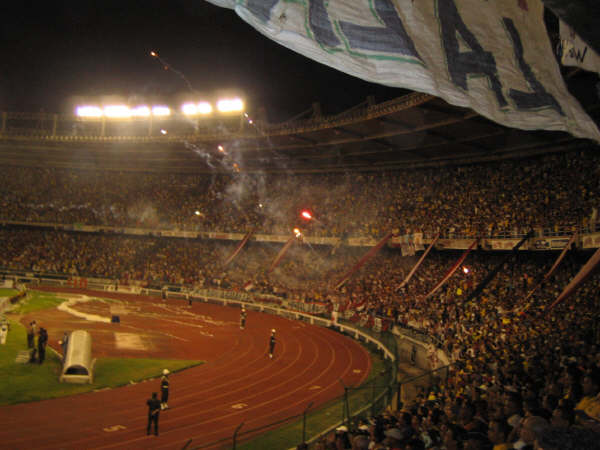
Football is the most popular sport in Colombia. In the picture, a match is being held in Barranquilla.

== Cycling ==
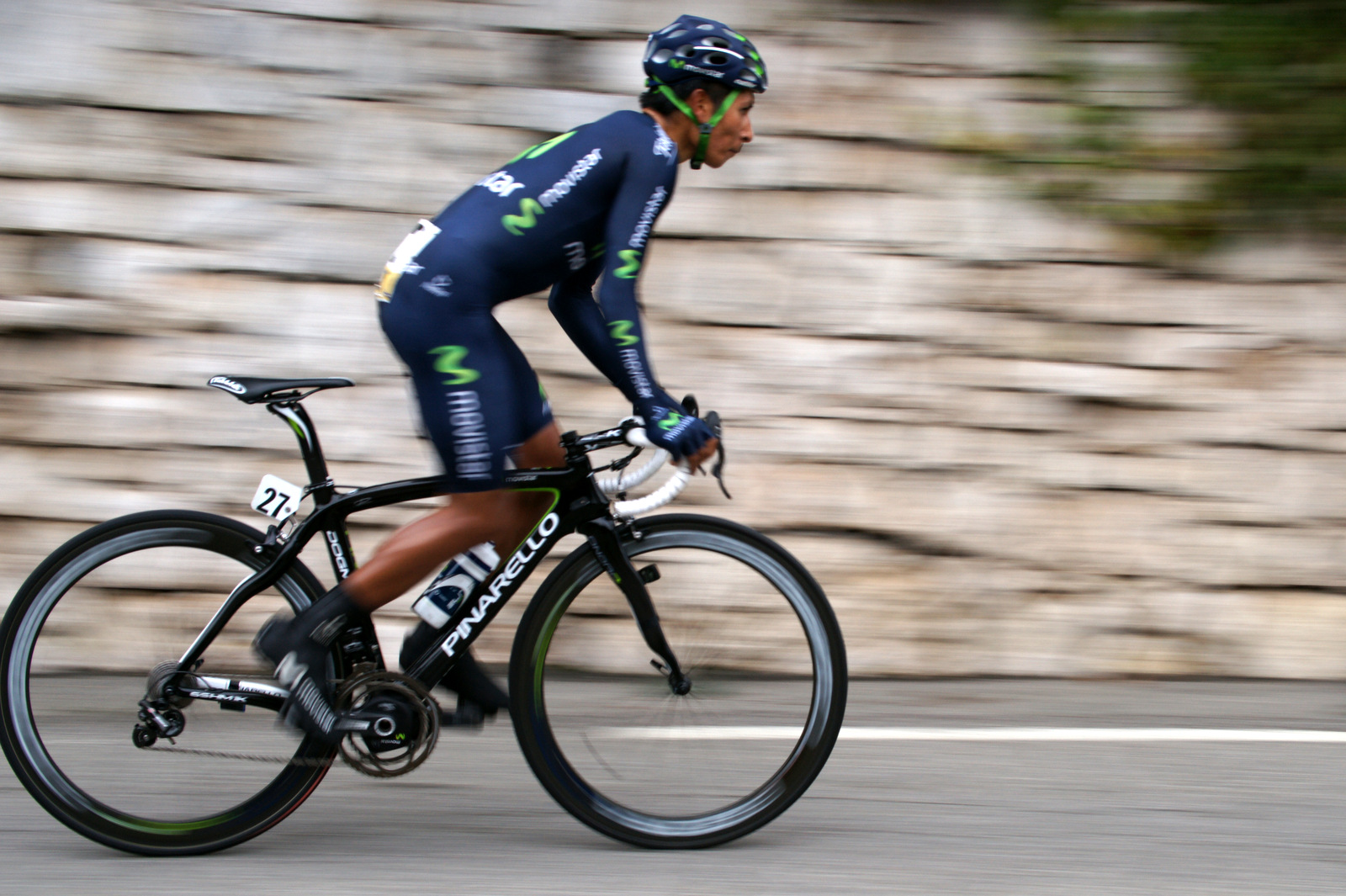
Nairo Quintana: Colombian Champion of the Giro d'Italia and the Vuelta a España.

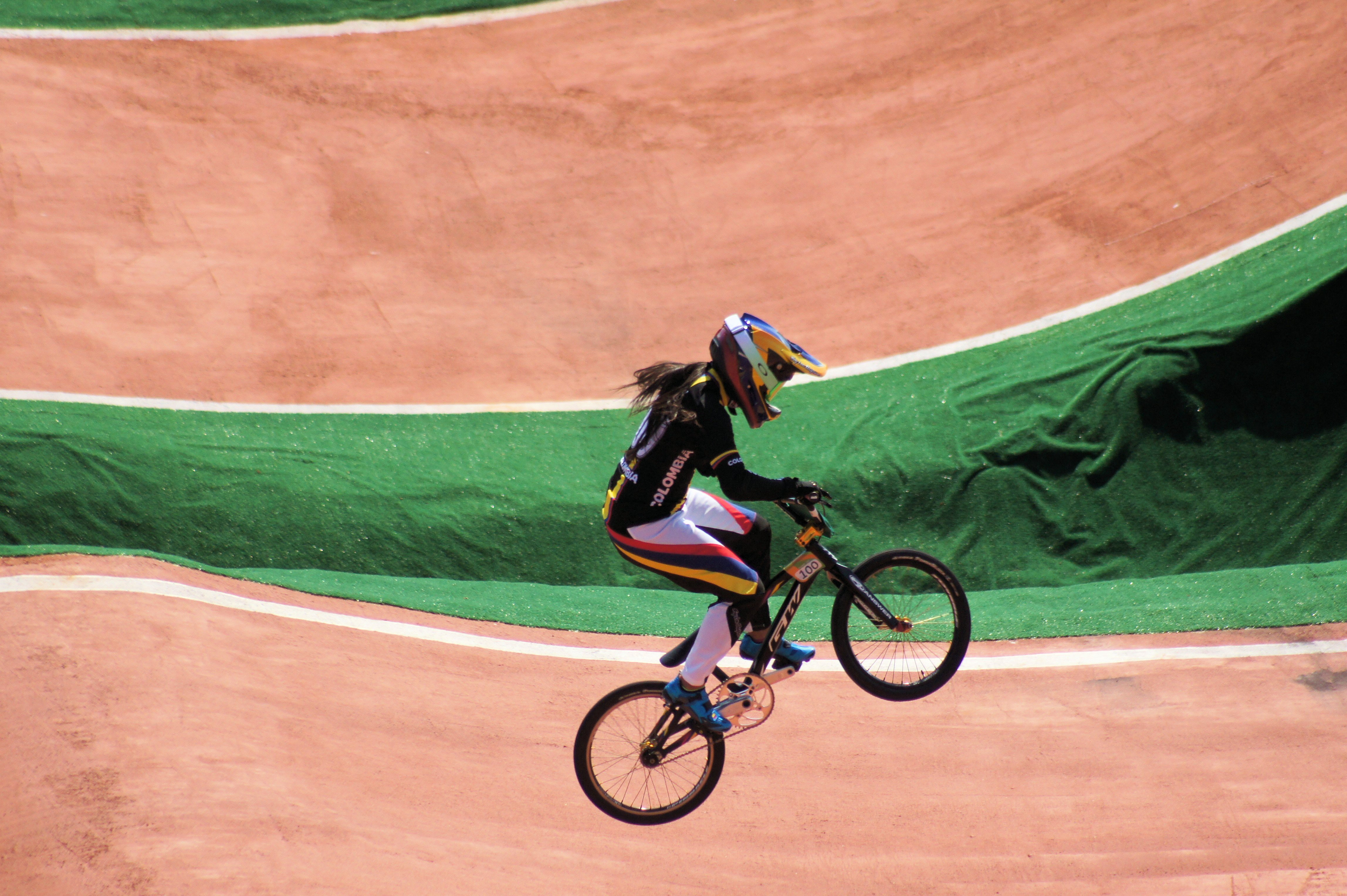
Mariana Pajón is a Colombian cyclist, two-time Olympic gold medalist and BMX World Champion.

Cycling in Colombia became very popular with the beginning of the annual Vuelta a Colombia race in 1951, followed by the annual Clásico RCN starting in 1961. The triumphs of Martín Emilio "Cochise" Rodríguez in European cycling competitions increased the sport's popularity, which in turn helped to develop the Colombian Cycling Federation. Rodriguez was followed by professional Colombian cyclists known as the "Colombian beetles", which include up to this date Luis "Lucho" Herrera, Luis Felipe Laverde, Fabio Parra, Víctor Hugo Peña, Santiago Botero, Mauricio Soler. The "escarabajo" (beetle) nickname was coined by radio announcer José Enrique Buitrago, while watching Ramón Hoyos climb a hill ahead of French professional racer José Beyaert during the 1955 Vuelta a Colombia. Colombian cycling has enjoyed a renaissance in the early 2010s, with Colombian riders enjoying international success. One of the factors cited for this success has been the establishment of the 4-72 Colombia cycling team (formerly known as Colombia es Pasión-Café de Colombia), which has developed several cyclists who have gone on to compete for UCI Worldteams. The government-backed Colombia-Coldeportes cycling team competed at the 2013 Giro d'Italia, and was the first all-Colombian team to do so for 21 years. The team aimed to secure UCI ProTeam status and compete in the Tour de France, however the team announced its disbanding in October 2015 due to the withdrawal of financial support from Coldeportes, the Colombian government's sports ministry. Riders who graduated to the UCI World Tour from the team included Esteban Chaves and Darwin Atapuma. High-profile riders emerging in this period include Nairo Quintana, Rigoberto Urán, Sergio Henao, Carlos Betancur and Mariana Pajón. The two main strongholds of the sport in Colombia are the Altiplano Cundiboyacense in the centre of the country and Antioquia in the west, both being mountainous regions. During the 1990s, the government of the Colombian capital, Bogotá introduced the Ciclovía, which became popular and were introduced later into other Colombian cities. The government of Bogotá later built Bogotá's Bike Paths Network to sponsor the practice of sports by the population and to curb the city's increasing pollution by drivers. The network extends throughout the city with bicycle use increasing five times in the city. There is an estimated 300,000 to 400,000 trips made daily in Bogotá by bicycle.

=== Champions ===
- María Luisa Calle, bronze medal winner in the 2004 Summer Olympics in Athens and World Champion.
- Fabio Parra, 3rd place in the tour de France, 1988
- Santiago Botero, Time trial world champion
- Martín Emilio "Cochise" Rodríguez, Hour world record holder and world champion in 4,000 m pursuit.
- Marlon Pérez, Youth World Champion in the points race, 1994
- Efraín Domínguez, Double world record in kilometer and 200 m pushed 1987
- Luis "Lucho" Herrera, "El jardinerito", Champion of the Dauphiné Libéré (1988, 1991) and Vuelta a España (1987), first non-European to win the Tour de France Mountains classification (1985)
- Martín Ramírez, Champion Dauphiné Libéré 1984
- Alfonso Flórez Ortiz, Champion Tour de l'Avenir 1980
- Víctor Hugo Peña, one of only three Colombian cyclists to have ever worn the yellow jersey in the Tour de France (2003).
- Rigoberto Urán, silver medal winner in the Men's Olympic Road Race, 2012 Summer Olympics, second place in the Giro d'Italia (2013, 2014), second place in the Tour de France (2017).
- Mariana Pajón, gold medal winner at the 2012 Summer Olympics in the women's BMX event, gold medal winner at the 2016 Summer Olympics in the women's BMX event.
- Carlos Oquendo, bronze medal winner at the 2012 Summer Olympics in the men's BMX event.
- Nairo Quintana, 2nd place overall in the Tour de France, 2013, 1st place overall Tour of the Basque Country, 2013, 1st place overall Vuelta a Burgos, 2013, 1st place overall Giro d'Italia 2014, winner of Tirreno–Adriatico 2015, 1st place overall Vuelta a España 2016.
- Edwin Ávila, double track cycling world champion in the points race (2011,2014).
- Esteban Chaves, second place in the Giro d'Italia (2016)
- Carlos Ramírez placed third at the 2016 Summer Olympics in men's BMX
- Iván Sosa, 1st place overall in the 2018 Vuelta a Burgos
- Fernando Gaviria wearer of the Yellow Jersey in the 2018 Tour de France
- Egan Bernal winner of the general and youth classifications in the 2019 Tour de France and 2021 Giro d'Italia

== Roller skating ==
With the introduction of inline skates in Colombia during the 1990s, roller skating became widely practiced throughout most of the main cities in the country. It was mostly popular in the main and medium size cities such as Cartagena, Cali, Bogotá, Pasto, Barrancabermeja, Barranquilla, Medellín, and Valledupar. Colombia is a hub for roller skaters. The national team is a perennial powerhouse at the World Roller Speed Skating Championships and has won the overall title nine times in the past 12 years. Colombia also exports state-of-the-art technology in this sport.

=== Notable ===
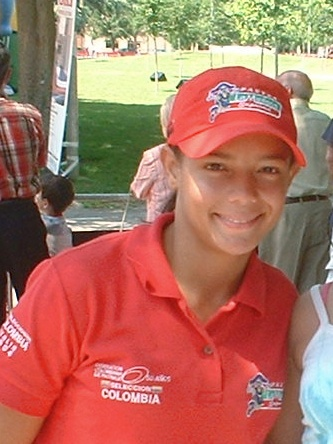
Cecilia Baena, female Inline speed skating world champion

- Claudia Ruizm Female Inline speed skating world champion 300 meters, 1990
- Luz Mery Tristan, Female Inline speed skating world champion 5,000 meters, 1990
- Guillermo Leon Botero, Inline speed skating world champion 20,000 meters, 1990
- Luis Eduardo Moreno, Inline speed skating world champion in China, 300 meters
- Liana Holguín, Female Inline speed skating world champion in China
- Andrés Felipe Muñoz, 15,000 meters Inline speed skating Junior world champion in Abruzzo, 2004 in China 2005
- Brigitte Méndez, Female Inline speed skating world champion, 15.000 m elimination, Abruzzo (Italy) 2004, Sushou (China) 2005, 1.000 m line Sushou (China) 2005
- Juan Nayib Tobón, Multiple World champion Inline speed skating in China
- Silvia Natalia Niño, Multiple Inline speed skating world champion
- Diego Rosero, Multiple Inline speed skating world champion
- Cecilia Baena, Female Inline speed skating world champion
- Berenice Moreno, Female Inline speed skating world champion
- Jorge Botero, Inline speed skating world champion
- Jennifer Caicedo, Female Inline speed skating world champion, 500 meters Duisburg (Germany), and Suzhou (China), and in Barquisimeto (Venezuela)
- Edwin Guevara, Inline speed skating world champion, 1996, 1998
- Anderson Ariza, Inline speed skating world champion, 2002
- Alexandra Vivas, Female Inline speed skating world champion, 10,000 meters (Italy) 2004
- Nelson Garzon, Inline speed skating world champion, 10,000 meters points, 2006
- Jersy Puello, Inline speed skating world champion, 200 m and 1.000 m (Italy) 2004
- Carolina Upegui, Inline speed skating world champion, 15,000 meters (Italy) 2004
- Kelly Martinez, Inline speed skating junior world champion, 15,000 meters Barquisimeto (Venezuela) 2003
- Jorge Cifuentes, Inline speed skating junior world champion, 1.000 m, 500 m J (Italy) 2004
- Martin Cardenas, National Skating Champion 100 m child (Colombia) 2003.
- Sara Vallejo World Figure Skating Champion Youth 200 m (Colombia) 2007.
- Maria Claudia salazar skating 15,000 m Youth 2007
- Ahmed Hamed 300 m skating world Champion Palestina youth 2007

== Combat sports ==
=== Boxing ===
Professional boxing in Colombia is mostly practiced in Caribbean region and the Pacific Region. Boxing in Colombia was also introduced by Europeans in the late 19th century and became popular in Latin America in the early 20th century, and in Colombia became popular in the 1960s, with the triumphs of Antonio "Kid Pambele" Cervantes who became a two time world Jr. Welterweight champion. He was then followed by boxers like Prudencio Cardona, Rodrigo Valdéz, Fidel Bassa, and many more. The success of these boxers created a fan base and many Colombians started to follow the sport. The National Boxing Commission of Colombia (Comisión Nacional de Boxeo de Colombia) was created and regulated the practice of boxing in Colombia. In the 1980s, the success of Miguel "Happy" Lora reigned in the bantam weight division (118 pounds) -WBC- from 1985 to 1988 and the silver medal in the Pan American Games of Carlos José Tamara. Another boxers have figured internationally and won some titles such as Ener Julio, Joel Julio, among others. During the 1990s, surged Irene "Mambaco" Pacheco who became a world champion in the IBF Flyweight category, and in the 2000s, Fulgencio Zúñiga current IBO Super middleweight champion, recently, Yuberjen Martinez won the silver medal in Rio 2016.

==== Champions ====
- Tomas Molinares, World Boxing champion, welter jr division (WBA) 1988
- Prudencio Cardona, World Boxing champion, light division 1982 (WBC)
- Ricardo cardona, World Boxing champion
- Elvis Álvarez, World Boxing champion, light division 1989–1990 (WBO), 1991 (WBA)
- Irene Pacheco, World Boxing champion FIB, fly division 1999
- Kermin Guardia, World Boxing champion OMB, minimum division
- Beibis Mendoza, World Boxing champion AMB, minifly division
- Camilo el "Bambino" García, World Boxing champion FIB, fly division 1992
- Daniel Reyes, World Boxing champion FIB, minimum division
- Rodrigo Valdéz WBC Middleweight Champion, Undisputed World Middleweight Champion
- Luis "Chicanero" Mendoza, World Boxing champion
- Jorge Eliecer Julio, World Boxing champion and Bronze medal 1988 Olympic Games
- Mauricio Pastrana, World Boxing champion
- Antonio Cervantes "Kid" Pambelé, World Boxing champion, welter jr
- Miguel "Happy" Lora, World Boxing champion, 1985 until 1988 (WBC)
- Fidel Bassa, World Boxing champion, light division 1987–1989 (WBA)
- Rafael "Derby" Pineda, Campeón Mundial de Boxeo Welter jr
- Ener Julio, World Boxing champion, welter jr
- Edison Miranda
- Carlos Maussa, World Boxing champion, welter jr
- Miguel "Huracán" Barrera, World Boxing champion FIB, minimum division
- Miguel "Mascara" Maturana, World Boxing champion Aficionado rooster division, Montreal, Canadá 1981
- Joel Julio
- Robinsón Pitalúa
- Clemente Rojas, bronze medal, 1972 Summer Olympics
- Alfonso Pérez, bronze medal, 1972 Summer Olympics
- Jorge Julio Rocha, bronze medal, 1988 Summer Olympics
- Yuberjen Martinez, silver medal, 2016 Summer Olympics
- Rubén "Huracán" Palacios, World Boxing champion, feather division OMB
- Juan Urango, World Boxing champion, super light division FIB

=== Olympic wrestling ===
- Albeiro García, World Champion Greco-Roman wrestling, Stockholm, 1980
- Joselio Mosquera, World Champion Greco-Roman wrestling
- Jackeline Rentería – 2008 and 2012 Olympics – Women's Freestyle – Bronze – 55 kg

== Motorsports ==
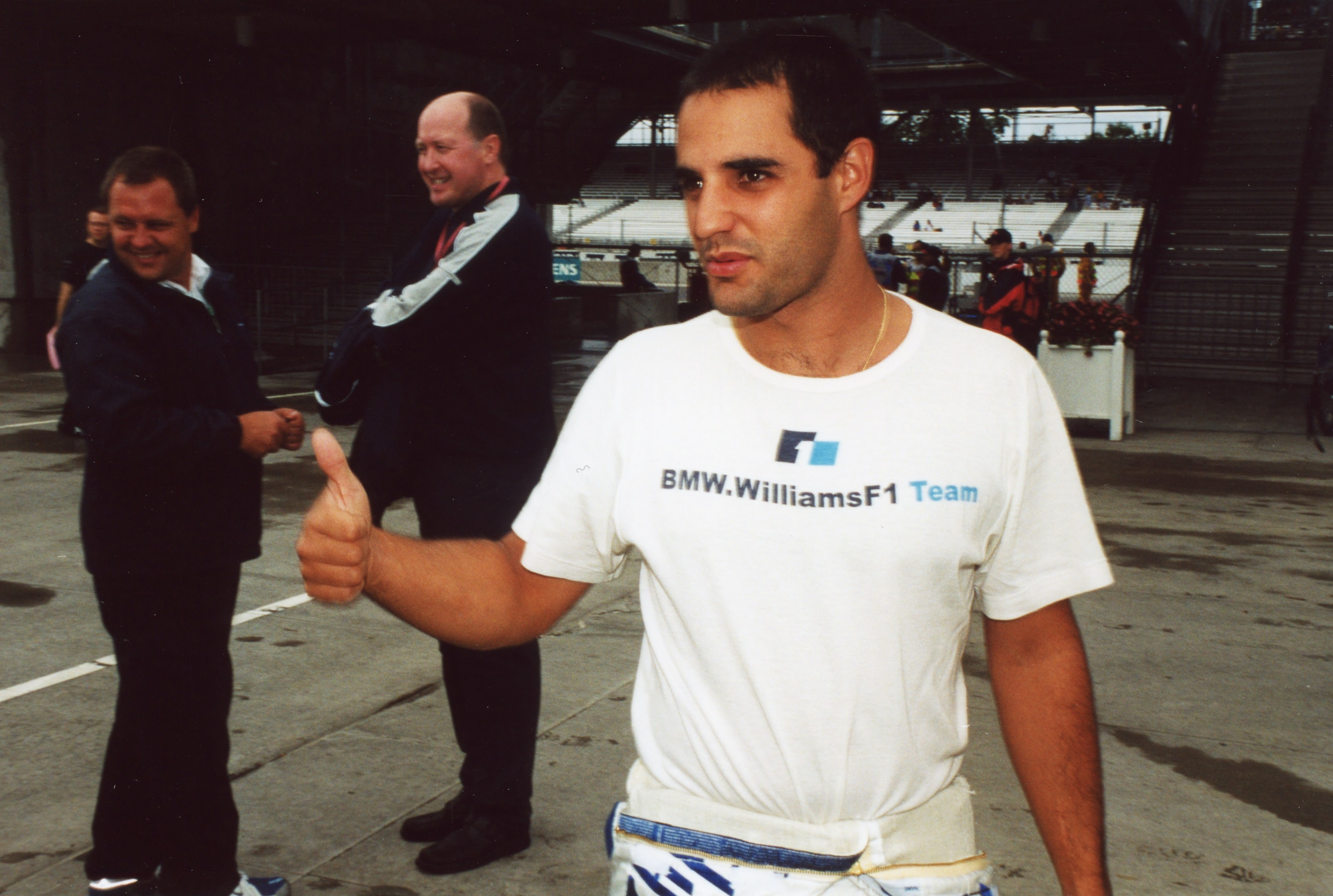
Juan Pablo Montoya gained worldwide fame participating in the most popular motorsport competitions of Europe and the United States.

- Roberto Guerrero, former Formula One and IndyCar driver
- Martin Cardenas, 250cc Grand Prix motorcycle racing rider.
- Yonny Hernández, MotoGP Grand Prix motorcycle racing rider.

Juan Pablo Montoya is the most successful racing driver from Colombia. He is one of only three drivers to have won races in American open-wheel car racing, Formula One, and NASCAR, along with Americans Dan Gurney and Mario Andretti. Montoya was the CART champion in 1999, and is a two-time winner of the Indianapolis 500, in 2000 and 2015.

== Basketball ==
Colombia hosted the 1982 Basketball World Cup, one of the most watched events the country has ever hosted. Since then, the country's basketball team has declined a bit. Throughout the decades, Colombia produced several internationally recognized players such as Juan Palacios, who has played in several of Europe's elite competitions and Braian Angola who recently became the first Colombian player Drafted in the NBA.

== Chess ==
- Miguel Cuéllar
- Boris de Greiff
- Ilse Guggenberger
- Luis Augusto Sánchez
- Alonso Zapata, Finished Second Youth World Championship 1977, Great Internacional Masters.

== Athletics ==
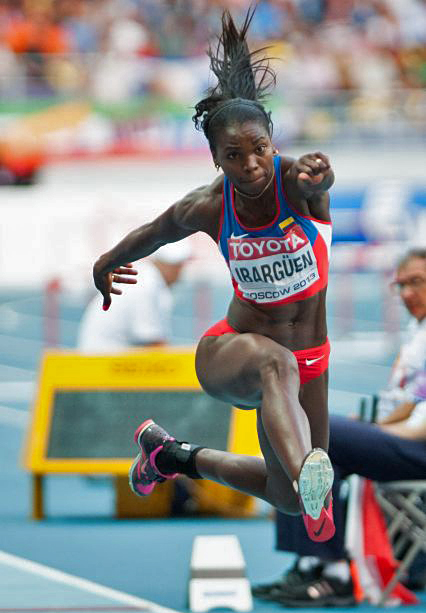
Caterine Ibargüen. Her notable achievements include a gold medal at the 2016 Summer Olympics, silver medal in the 2012 Summer Olympics, two gold medals in the IAAF World Championships in Athletics, and two gold medals in the 2011 Pan American Games and 2015 Pan American Games.

- Caterine Ibargüen, Athlete, Gold medal at the 2016 Summer Olympics, silver medal in the 2012 Summer Olympics, two gold medals in the IAAF World Championships in Athletics, and two gold medals in the 2011 Pan American Games and 2015 Pan American Games.
- Ximena Restrepo, Athletic runner, Bronze medal, 1992 Olympic Games
- Luis Fernando López, athlete, bronze medal at the 2011 World Championship in 20 km race walking
- Anthony Zambrano is a sprinter who won silver medals at the 2020 Olympic Games and the 2019 World Athletics Championships in the 400m.
- Sandra Arenas won a silver medal in the Women's 20 kilometres walk at the 2020 Olympic Games.

== Baseball ==
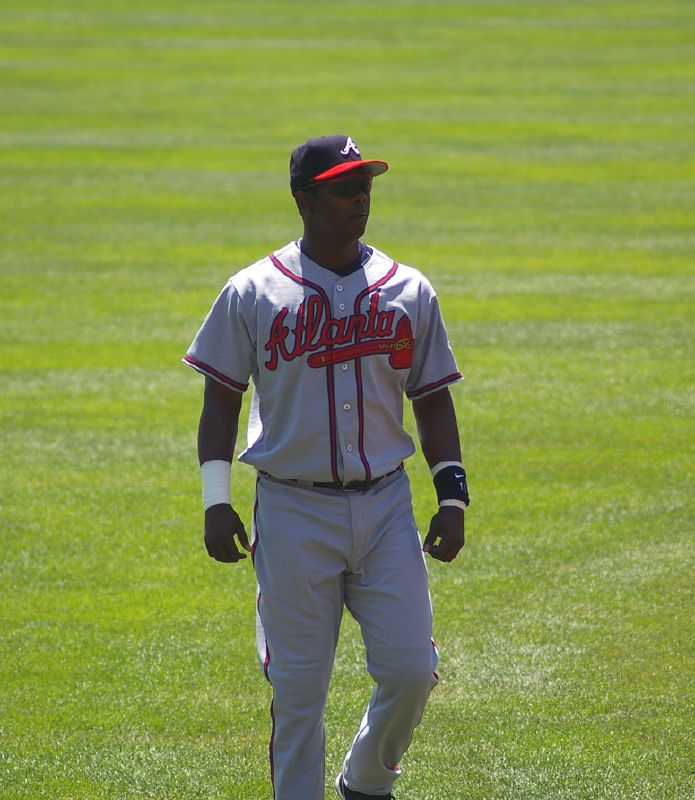
Édgar Rentería, former MLB shortstop.

Baseball grew the most in Caribbean Colombia historically, due to its greater proximity to the United States. In the 21st century, Venezuelan refugees have helped the game grow further.

- Liga Colombiana de Béisbol Profesional
- Colombia, Baseball World Cup Champions 1947, 1965
- Colombia Gold medal Bolivarian Games in Lima, Peru, 1947
- Colombia Gold medal Central American and Caribbean Games in Barranquilla, 1946
- Orlando Ramírez, Major League Baseball
- Jackie Gutiérrez, Major League Baseball player
- Jolbert Cabrera, Major League Baseball player
- Orlando Cabrera, Major League Baseball player (Champion 2004 World Series with Boston Red Sox).
- Luis Castro, Major League Baseball player
- Édgar Rentería, Major League Baseball player (Champion 1997 World Series with Florida Marlins and 2010 World Series with San Francisco Giants).
- Emiliano Fruto, Major League Baseball player, pitcher Seattle Mariners
- Ernesto Frieri, Major League Baseball player, pitcher Los Angeles Angels of Anaheim

Baseball is the most popular sport in the Caribbean region of Colombia and its the third most popular sport in Colombia after football and cycling.

=== Colombian baseball stadiums ===
Nº	Stadium	City	Capacity	Home team
1	Estadio Once de Noviembre	Cartagena de Indias	12,000	Tigres de Cartagena - Indios de Cartagena
2	Estadio 20 de Enero	Sincelejo	10,000	Toros de Sincelejo - Rancheros de Sincelejo
3	Estadio Édgar Rentería	Barranquilla	8,000	Caimanes de Barranquilla – Leones de Barranquilla – Eléctricos de Barranquilla – Vaqueros de Barranquilla
4	Estadio Luis Alberto Villegas	Medellín	8,000	Potros de Medellín – Pumas de Antioquia
5	Estadio Miguel Chávez del Valle	Cali	4,500	Azucareros del Valle
6	Estadio 18 de Junio	Montería	4.500	Vaqueros de Montería – Leones de Montería
7	Estadio Distrital Hermes Barros Cabas	Bogotá	2,700	Águilas de Bogotá/Metropolitanos de Bogotá
8	Wellingwourth May	San Andrés	2,000	Piratas de San Andrés
9	Estadio Rafael Naar	Turbaco	1,200	None
10	Estadio Rafael Hernández Pardo	Santa Marta	–	Tiburones de Santa Marta
11	Estadio Júlio Silva Bolaño	Ciénaga	3,000	None
12	Estadio Luis Támara Samudio	Tolú	1,000	None

== Bowling ==
- Jairo Ocampo, Bowling World Champion, 1974
- Armando Mariño, Bowling World Champion, 1983
- Clara Guerrero, Female Bowling World Champion, 2003, 2006, and 2009
- Luz Adriana Leal, bronze medal at the 1995 World Championship
- Sara Vargas, World Ranking Masters Champion
- Paola Gómez, bronze medal at the 2011 World Championship
- Andrés Gómez, Professional title holder
- Manuel Otalora, World Games Champion in 2009
- Anggie Ramírez, World Games Silver medalist in 2009 and 2013 Ibero-American Champion
- Laura Fonnegra, Gold Medalist at the 2010 World Youth Championship
- Santiago Mejía, Pan American Gold Medalist
- Juan Francisco Gómez, Pan-American Gold Medalist
- Juliana Franco, Bronze medal at the 2012 World Youth Championship and Pan-American Gold Medalist

== Golf ==
Currently, Camilo Villegas is the most recognized Colombian golfer in the world. He has been a PGA Tour professional in the United States since 2006. In 2008, Villegas was the first PGA Tour player in 11 years to win his first two PGA Tour events back-to-back. He is currently among the top 10 ranked golfers in the world, according to the Official World Golf Rankings. Marisa Baena was the inaugural champion of the HSBC Women's World Match Play Championship in 2005. Camilo Benedetti, Diego Vanegas, and Manuel "Manny" Villegas (the younger brother of Camilo Villegas) are currently playing professional golf in the United States on the Nationwide Tour, with hopes of eventually graduating to the PGA Tour. David Vanegas is playing on the equivalent Challenge Tour with the prospect of promotion to the European Tour.

== Weightlifting ==
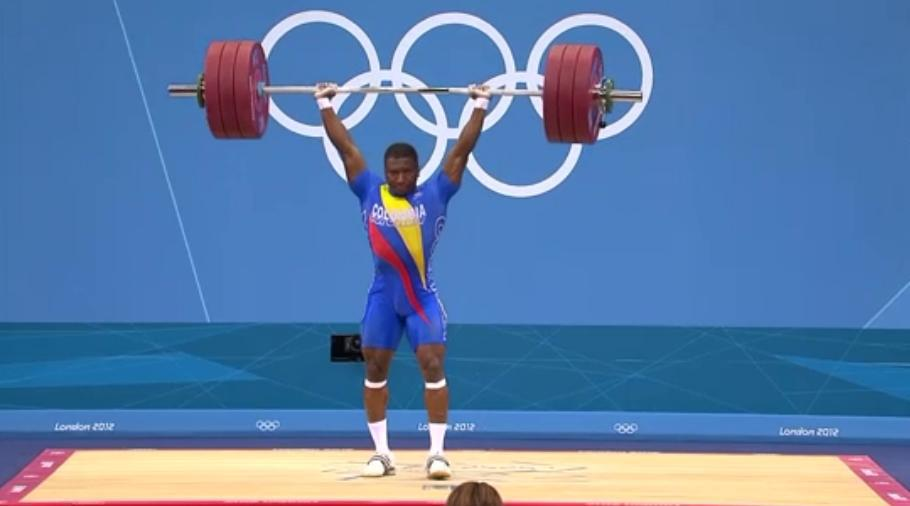
Óscar Figueroa won Olympic Gold at the 2016 Summer Olympics

- María Isabel Urrutia, female weightlifter, multiple times world champion and gold medal, 2000 Olympic Games
- Óscar Figueroa, male weightlifter, Figueroa won Olympic Gold at the 2016 Summer Olympics, silver medal winner at the 2012 Olympic Games, silver medal winner at the 2006 Santo Domingo, gold medal winner at the 2008 Callao
- Mabel Mosquera, female weightlifter, bronze medal, 2004 Olympic Games
- Diego Fernando Salazar, male weightlifter, silver medal, 2008 Olympic Games

== Rugby league ==
Although Rugby league is a minor sport in Colombia they have a national team.

== Tennis ==
- Santiago Giraldo, professional tennis player
- Alejandro Falla, professional tennis player
- Juan Sebastián Cabal, professional tennis player
- Robert Farah Maksoud, professional tennis player
- Mauricio Hadad, professional tennis player
- Fabiola Zuluaga, female professional tennis player
- Catalina Castaño, female professional tennis player
- Mariana Duque, Female Professional tennis player (as of 2016 current no.1 female tennis player in Colombia)

== Shooting ==
- Helmut Bellingrodt, Shooting world champion, 1972, 1984 Olympic Games
- Bernardo Tovar, Automatic pistol world champion in Moscow 1990 and seven-time champion of in pistol, fast shooting, and automatic pistol.

== Winter sports ==
The skating federation has started to develop ice sports, including bandy, ice hockey, short track and speed skating

== Tejo ==
Tejo is the national sport of Colombia.

== Beach volleyball ==
Colombia featured a women's national team in beach volleyball that competed at the 2018–2020 CSV Beach Volleyball Continental Cup.

== Climbing ==
Colombia is also a popular destination for technical rock climbing, with opportunities for bouldering, sport climbing, trad climbing and a mix of styles. The town of Suesca is surrounded by established rock climbs and draws climbers from all over the world.

== Athletes in other sports ==
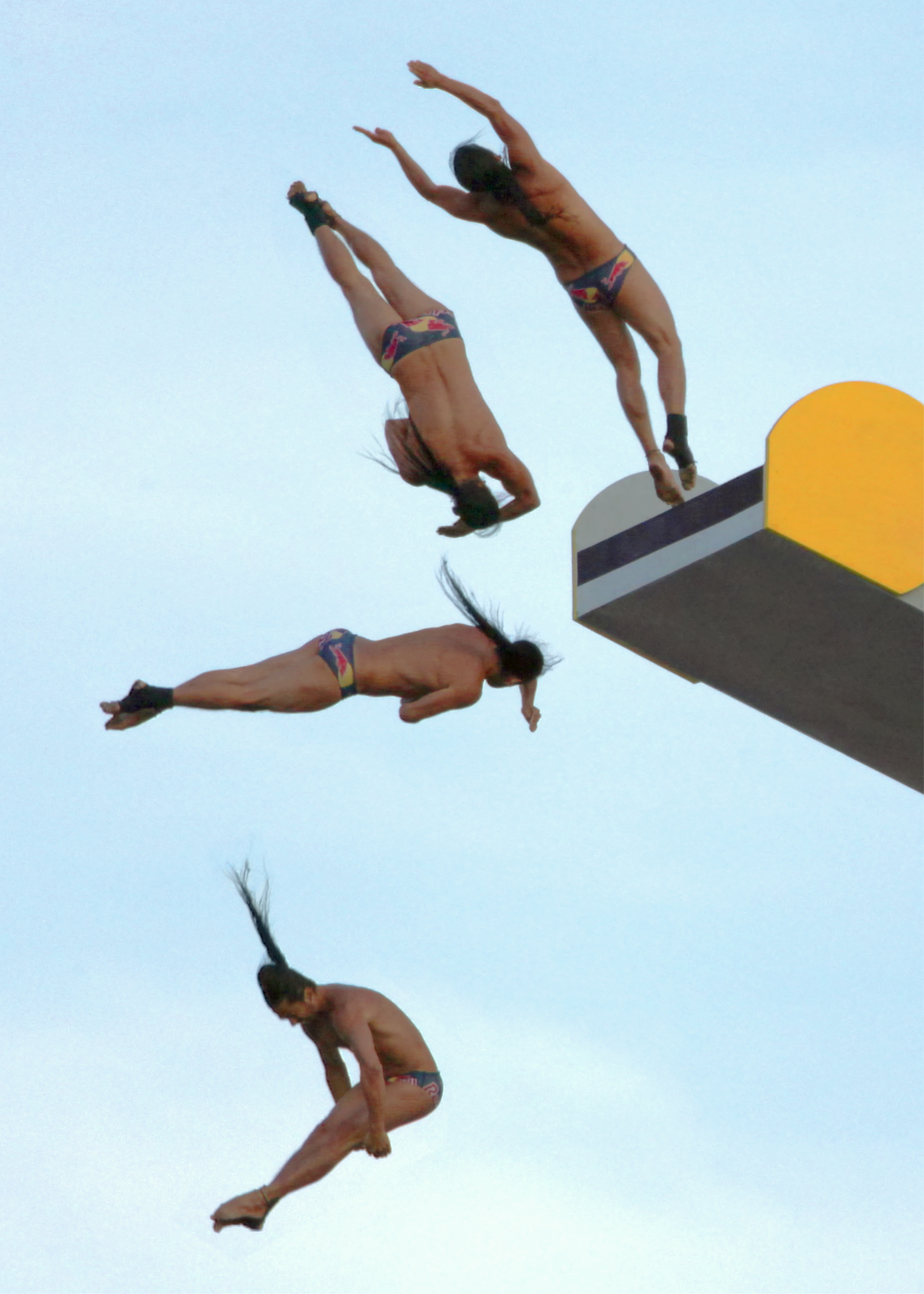
A composite dive from Orlando Duque.

- Yuri Alvear, female judoka, Bronze medal winner at 2012 Olympic Games, 3 time World Champion
- Óscar Muñoz, taekwondoka, Bronze medal winner at 2012 Olympic Games
- Orlando Duque, High Diving World Champion
- Natalia Sánchez, archer, World Championship bronze medalist
- Mauricio Rivas, fencer, World Championship bronze medalist

== Medals by Games ==
- As of the 2019 Parapan American Games

=== Global Games ===
Games	Gold	Silver	Bronze	Total
Colombia at the Deaflympics	0	0	1	1
Colombia at the INAS Global Games	7	0	2	9
Colombia at the Military World Games	0	0	1	1
Colombia at the Olympics	5	9	14	28
Colombia at the Paralympics	3	8	12	23
Colombia at the Universiade	1	3	7	11
Colombia at the World Games	29	40	26	95
Colombia at the Youth Olympic Games	7	7	5	19
Totals (8 entries)	52	67	68	187

=== Regional Games ===
Games	Gold	Silver	Bronze	Total
Colombia at the Pan American Games	136	170	262	568
Colombia at the Parapan American Games	98	113	115	326
Totals (2 entries)	234	283	377	894

=== Sub Regional Games ===
Games	Gold	Silver	Bronze	Total
Colombia at the South American Beach Games	8	9	13	30
Colombia at the South American Games	503	423	400	1,326
Colombia at the South American Para Games	33	43	47	123
Colombia at the South American Youth Games	71	53	57	181
Totals (4 entries)	615	528	517	1,660

=== Inter Regional Games ===
Games	Gold	Silver	Bronze	Total
Colombia at the ALBA Games	77	125	184	386
Colombia at the Bolivarian Games	1,399	1,313	1,067	3,779
Colombia at the Central American and Caribbean Games	530	616	656	1,802
Colombia at the Ibero American Games	0	0	1	1
Totals (4 entries)	2,006	2,054	1,908	5,968

== See also ==
- Colombia at the Olympics
