= Pelota =

== Sports ==
Pelota (Spanish for ball) can refer to the popular and shortened names for a number of ball games:

- Basque pelota
- Chaza
- Jai alai
- Mesoamerican ballgame
- Palla
- Pelota mixteca
- Valencian pilota
- Frontenis
- Pétanque
- Racketlon

== Other uses ==
- Pelota (boat), an improvised skin boat for crossing rivers.
- Protein pelota homolog a protein encoded by the PELO gene
