= Leopard Tamakuma =

Japanese boxer

Personal information
- Born: Yukito Tamakuma; January 25, 1964 (age 62) Aomori, Japan
- Height: 5 ft 8 in (173 cm)
- Weight: Flyweight

Boxing career
- Stance: Southpaw

Boxing record
- Total fights: 33
- Wins: 27
- Win by KO: 13
- Losses: 5
- Draws: 1

Yukito Tamakuma (born January 25, 1964), better known as Leopard Tamakuma, is a Japanese former professional boxer who competed from 1983 to 1991. He won the WBA flyweight title in 1990.

== Professional career ==
Tamakuma turned professional in 1983 and compiled a record of 17–4 before facing and defeating Lee Yul-woo, to win the WBA flyweight title. He would fight to a draw in his first defense against Jesús Rojas. He later lost the title to Elvis Álvarez. He retired shortly after the fight.

== Professional boxing record ==
33 fights	27 wins	5 losses
By knockout	13	1
By decision	14	4
Draws	1	

No.	Result	Record	Opponent	Type	Round, time	Date	Location	Notes
33	Loss	27–5–1	Elvis Álvarez	UD	12	Mar 14, 1991	Nippon Budokan, Tokyo, Japan	Lost WBA flyweight title
32	Draw	27–4–1	Jesús Rojas	MD	12	Dec 6, 1990	Prefectural Gymnasium, Aomori, Japan	Retained WBA flyweight title
31	Win	27–4	Lee Yul-woo	TKO	10 (12)	Jul 29, 1990	City Gymnasium, Mito, Japan	Won WBA flyweight title
30	Win	26–4	Flash Calonia	KO	10 (10)	May 10, 1990	Korakuen Hall, Tokyo, Japan	
29	Win	25–4	Rex Rapiso	KO	3 (10)	Nov 11, 1989	Korakuen Hall, Tokyo, Japan	
28	Win	24–4	Pornmongkol Hor Mahachai	KO	3 (10)	Jul 8, 1989	Korakuen Hall, Tokyo, Japan	
27	Loss	23–4	Kim Yong-kang	UD	12	Mar 5, 1989	Prefectural Gymnasium, Aomori, Japan	For WBC flyweight title
26	Win	23–3	Hisashi Tokushima	TKO	5 (10)	Jun 5, 1988	Kinki University Auditorium, Osaka, Japan	Retained Japanese flyweight title
25	Win	22–3	Toshio Aikawa	PTS	10	Feb 25, 1988	Korakuen Hall, Tokyo, Japan	Retained Japanese flyweight title
24	Win	21–3	Elysser Bautista	TKO	7 (10)	Nov 30, 1987	Korakuen Hall, Tokyo, Japan	
23	Win	20–3	Tetsumi Takeshita	KO	7 (10)	Sep 21, 1987	Korakuen Hall, Tokyo, Japan	Retained Japanese flyweight title
22	Win	19–3	Petchainart Donjadee	KO	4 (10)	Jul 20, 1987	Korakuen Hall, Tokyo, Japan	
21	Win	18–3	Koji Nishikawa	PTS	10	May 28, 1987	Korakuen Hall, Tokyo, Japan	Retained Japanese flyweight title
20	Win	17–3	Koji Nishikawa	PTS	10	Feb 26, 1987	Korakuen Hall, Tokyo, Japan	Won Japanese flyweight title
19	Win	16–3	Shin Sayama	KO	7 (10)	Nov 27, 1986	Korakuen Hall, Tokyo, Japan	
18	Win	15–3	Kentoku Nakama	PTS	8	Sep 25, 1986	Korakuen Hall, Tokyo, Japan	
17	Win	14–3	Shunichi Nakajima	PTS	6	Jul 23, 1986	Korakuen Hall, Tokyo, Japan	
16	Win	13–3	Masayuki Takahashi	KO	3 (6)	May 22, 1986	Korakuen Hall, Tokyo, Japan	
15	Win	12–3	Kazuyoshi Funaki	PTS	10	Feb 27, 1986	Korakuen Hall, Tokyo, Japan	
14	Win	11–3	Tomoo Matsumoto	TKO	4 (8)	Oct 24, 1985	Korakuen Hall, Tokyo, Japan	
13	Win	10–3	Kinya Nakamura	PTS	8	Aug 22, 1985	Korakuen Hall, Tokyo, Japan	
12	Win	9–3	Yutaka Tsunoda	KO	7 (8)	Jun 18, 1985	Korakuen Hall, Tokyo, Japan	
11	Loss	8–3	Kenji Yokozawa	MD	10	Mar 28, 1985	Korakuen Hall, Tokyo, Japan	
10	Loss	8–2	Tomohiro Kiyuna	KO	10 (10)	Dec 10, 1984	Korakuen Hall, Tokyo, Japan	
9	Win	8–1	Masaru Yoshimoto	PTS	8	Oct 12, 1984	Korakuen Hall, Tokyo, Japan	
8	Win	7–1	Hitoshi Taniuchi	KO	6 (8)	Jul 30, 1984	Korakuen Hall, Tokyo, Japan	
7	Loss	6–1	Takahiro Masaki	PTS	8	May 3, 1984	Korakuen Hall, Tokyo, Japan	
6	Win	6–0	Kazuhisa Koyama	PTS	6	Feb 22, 1984	Prefectural Gymnasium, Osaka, Japan	
5	Win	5–0	Seiji Tomari	PTS	6	Dec 17, 1983	Korakuen Hall, Tokyo, Japan	
4	Win	4–0	Kenji Yokozawa	PTS	4	Nov 10, 1983	Korakuen Hall, Tokyo, Japan	
3	Win	3–0	Koki Oko	PTS	4	Sep 27, 1983	Korakuen Hall, Tokyo, Japan	
2	Win	2–0	Takeshi Toh	PTS	4	Jul 8, 1983	Korakuen Hall, Tokyo, Japan	
1	Win	1–0	Takuto Misawa	PTS	4	May 24, 1983	Korakuen Hall, Tokyo, Japan	

== See also ==
- List of world flyweight boxing champions
- List of Japanese boxing world champions
- Boxing in Japan

Sporting positions
Regional boxing titles
Preceded by Koji Nishikawa	Japanese flyweight champion February 26, 1987 – 1988; Vacated	Vacant Title next held by Kenbun Taiho
World boxing titles
Preceded by Lee Yul-woo	WBA flyweight champion July 29, 1990 – March 14, 1991	Succeeded by Elvis Álvarez
