= Chaza =

South American racquet sport

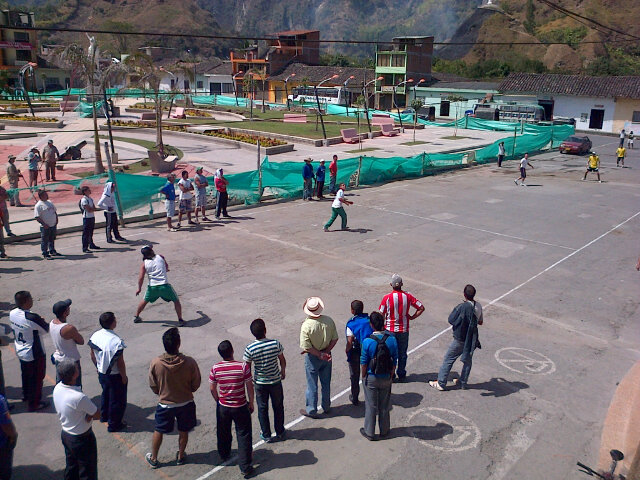
- A Chaza match at Nariño Department
- Nicknames: Tenis Pastuso (Pastuso Tennis)
- First played: 15th century

Characteristics
- Contact: No
- Team members: 4 players each team
- Type: Racquet sport
- Equipment: ball, racquet
- Venue: Outdoor

Presence
- Country or region: Colombia and Ecuador
- Olympic: No
- Paralympic: No

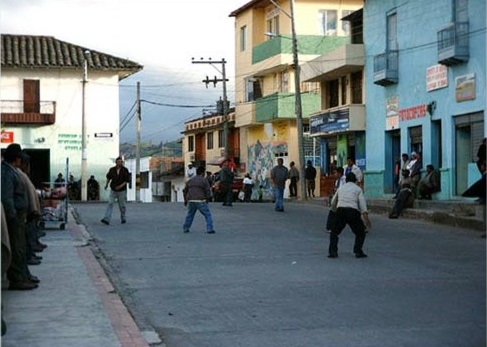
Some people playing Chaza in Puerres, Colombia

The Chaza, or pelota nacional (national ball), is a South American racquet sport (like tennis), which is practiced on a rectangular area bounded by lines. This area is divided by a line drawn on the floor that divides the playing field. It is played between two teams, each with four players. The object of the game is to launch a ball (called "bombo") by hand or racquet so that it bounces into the opponent's field without being returned.

The sport is widely practiced in Nariño, Colombia, and it is the national sport of Ecuador.

== History ==
Chaza was created in the 14th century by indigenous communities who inhabited the area that is currently on the border of Colombia and Ecuador. In the beginning it was played with a heavy leather ball, which was thrown by hand.

== Game Rules ==
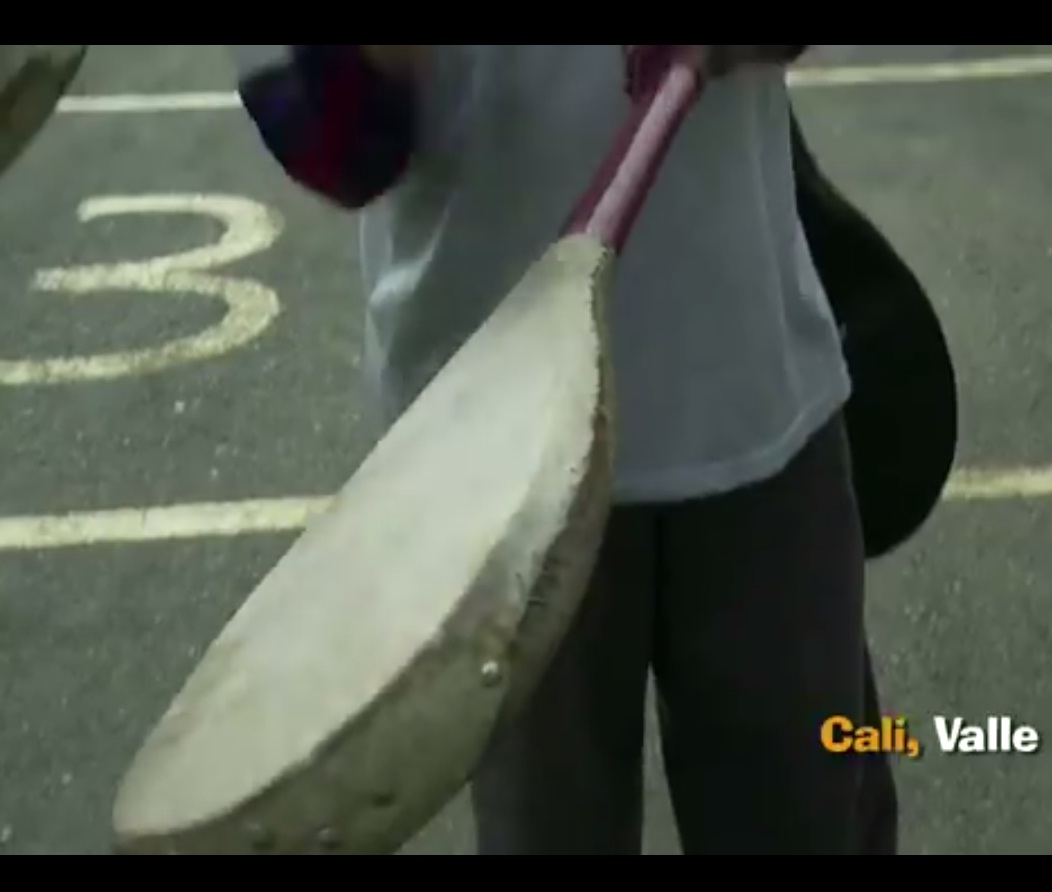
Bombo (racket) for Chaza

This game can be played with hands or with a wooden racquet, The ball is lined with goatskin and called a "bombo" weighing 70-90 grams.

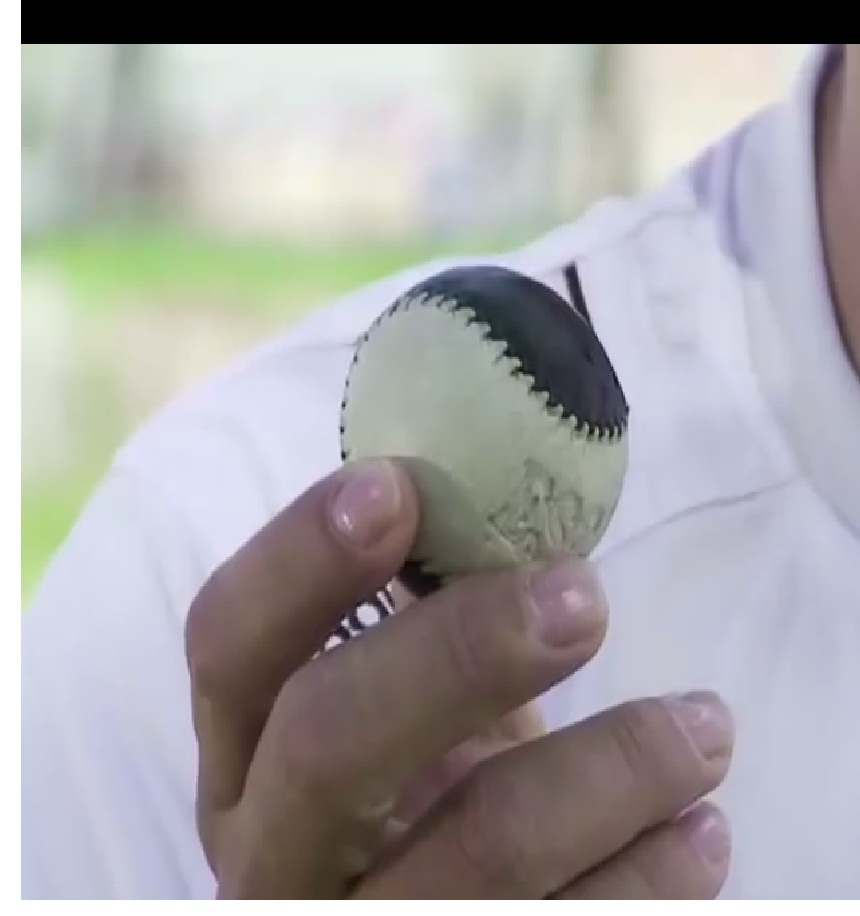
Ball for chaza

As in volleyball, players rotate, which is why the field has a line (6 on each side) indicating which position each should play.

Points are scored as for tennis, i.e., 15, 30, 40 and the point. When a team gets 6 points and maintains a minimum difference of 2 points over their rival, it wins the set. When a team wins 2 sets, it wins the game.

Each point is also scored as in tennis, looking for the opposing team to fail to return the ball before it bounces 2 times within their field.

The field is rectangular and concrete and 110 meters long and 10 meters wide, divided by a line drawn on the ground.

== See also ==
- Sport in Colombia
- Sport in Ecuador
- National sport
- Tejo
- Tennis
- Volleyball
- Pelota
