= Baucke =

Baucke is a surname. Notable people with the surname include:

- Florian Baucke (1719–1779), Silesian and Bohemian Jesuit missionary
- Johann Friedrich Wilhelm Baucke (1848–1931), New Zealand linguist, ethnologist, journalist, and interpreter

== See also ==
- Pauke
- Bauke
