= Hideki Todaka =

Japanese boxer (born 1973)

Hideki Todaka 戸高 秀樹
Personal information
- Nationality: Japanese
- Born: March 16, 1973 (age 53) Miyazaki, Miyazaki, Japan
- Height: 5 ft 4 in (163 cm)
- Weight: Super flyweight; Bantamweight

Boxing career
- Reach: 64 1/2 in (164 cm)
- Stance: Orthodox

Boxing record
- Total fights: 26
- Wins: 21
- Win by KO: 10
- Losses: 4
- Draws: 1

Hideki Todaka (戸高 秀樹, Todaka Hideki; born March 16, 1973 in Miyazaki, Japan) is a former professional boxer who fought in the super flyweight and bantamweight divisions. He is the former WBA super flyweight champion, and former WBA bantamweight interim champion.

== Early life ==
Todaka was a delinquent during his teens, getting into a number of street fights during his teens, and he dropped out of high school to begin boxing at a local gym in Miyazaki. Todaka got his professional license when he was 18, but was only able to make his debut in 1994, when he was 21, after having to recuperate from a back injury.

== Professional career ==
In June, 1996, Todaka challenged and won the Japanese light flyweight title. This was only his 10th professional bout. Todaka defended the title once in September, before returning it in November.

=== First World Title ===
In 1998, Todaka transferred from his gym in Miyazaki to a larger gym located in Nagoya. WBA super flyweight champion Satoshi Iida also trained at this gym, and Todaka often fought on the undercard of Iida's title matches.

Todaka won his fight in December, 1998 to obtain a world ranking, but Iida lost to Jesus Kiki Rojas the same day to lose his WBA Super flyweight title. Todaka became the opponent for Rojas' first defense, which was scheduled for March, 1999 in Todaka's hometown, Miyazaki.

Todaka made an aggressive start, giving the veteran champion a challenging fight in the early rounds. Todaka may have been too aggressive, as a head butt opened a cut above Rojas' left eye in the 3rd round. The bleeding did not stop, and the ring doctor ended the fight in the 4th round. The rules stated that a stoppage by an unintentional head butt caused before the 4th round would become a draw, and Rojas retained his title with a draw. Both sides immediately agreed on a rematch, which took place on July 31, 1999, in Nagoya.

=== Rematch vs. Rojas ===
In the rematch, Todaka dropped Rojas in the 2nd round with a right hook, but allowed the champion to accumulate points in the middle rounds. Todaka won back the later rounds of the fight, and the judges awarded him a close, but unanimous victory to make him the new WBA super flyweight champion.

=== 1st defense ===
The opponent for Todaka's first defense was Akihiko Nago, who was touted as the next Japanese world champion. Nago had a splendid record, winning several tournaments as an amateur, and undefeated in 15 fights as a professional.

The defense took place in Tokyo on November 7, 1999, and despite the reputation Nago had built up going into the fight, he seemed nervous in his first world title match, and was unable to land his powerful right hook. Todaka outboxed Nago for 12 rounds, and retained his title by a unanimous decision win. Nago was never able to regain his previous form after this loss.

=== 2nd defense ===
Todaka fought Yokthai Sithoar in April, 2000, for his second defense. Sithoar was a former world champion, and had fought Todaka's gymmate, Satoshi Iida, twice in world title matches.

Todaka's head was repeatedly snapped back from Sithoar's punches in the early and middle rounds, but in Round 8, Todaka's right hook caught Sithoar squarely in the head, just before the round was finished. Sithoar managed to stay standing, but could only stagger back to his own corner. Todaka took advantage of the opportunity, and pounded the Sithoar in the 9th and 10th rounds, and in the 11th round, he sent Sithoar reeling back to the ropes with a powerful punch. Sithoar could not get himself off the ropes, and the referee stopped the fight, to give Todaka an 11th-round TKO victory. Todaka was losing on all three of scorecards at the time of the stoppage.

=== Defeat ===
Almost half a year after his second defense, Todaka fought Leo Gamez in October 2000. Gamez had won world titles in three different weight classes, but it was expected to be an easy fight for Todaka, considering that Gamez was past his prime.

However, Todaka was not his usual self in the ring, as he seemed unable to see any of Gamez's punches. He was battered throughout the fight, before being knocked out by a powerful right hook from Gamez in the 7th round.

It was later revealed that Todaka was being treated for multiple sclerosis before the fight, which explains why he had so much trouble seeing Gamez's punches. In addition to his eye injury, Todaka also broke his jaw in the fight, which forced him into a long period of inactivity. He had held the WBA title for one year and two months, and it took him one year and five months to fully recover from his injuries.

=== Revenge match ===
Todaka spent all of 2001 to recover, and finally made his comeback in March 2002, winning three fights to regain his world ranking. On October 4, 2003, he met Leo Gamez again, for the WBA bantamweight interim title. It was three years since their last meeting, and the two traded blows for 12 rounds. In the end, Todaka won a close 2-1 split decision victory, avenging his previous loss, and becoming the 5th Japanese boxer to win world titles in two different weight classes.

=== Last fight and retirement ===
Todaka had planned on having a unification bout with the WBA bantamweight champion, but was unable to come to terms with promoters, and decided to make a defense instead, which was set on March 6, 2004, against Julio Zárate. Todaka had turned 30 in 2004, and no longer possessed the physical strength needed to compete at a world level. He spent the entire fight trying to catch up to the challenger, and lost by unanimous decision to lose his interim title after only five months. He announced his retirement shortly after the fight. His professional record was 21-4-1 (10KOs).

== Professional boxing record ==
26 fights	21 wins	4 losses
By knockout	10	1
By decision	11	3
Draws	1	

No.	Result	Record	Opponent	Type	Round, time	Date	Location	Notes
26	Loss	21–4–1	Julio Zárate	SD	12 (12)	2004-03-06	Super Arena, Saitama, Japan	Lost interim WBA bantamweight title
25	Win	21–3–1	Leo Gámez	SD	12 (12)	2003-10-04	Kokugikan, Tokyo, Japan	Won interim WBA bantamweight title
24	Win	20–3–1	Loedsiam Sithsoei	UD	10 (10)	2002-11-30	City Sogo Gym, Miyazaki, Japan	
23	Win	19–3–1	Wichit Khaekhunthod	KO	4 (10)	2002-08-11	International Conference Hall, Nagoya, Japan	
22	Win	18–3–1	Vesarat Kanchit	KO	3 (10)	2002-03-02	Prefectural Gymnasium, Miyazaki, Japan	
21	Loss	17–3–1	Leo Gámez	KO	7 (12)	2000-10-09	Prefectural Gymnasium, Nagoya, Japan	Lost WBA super-flyweight title
20	Win	17–2–1	Yokthai Sithoar	TKO	11 (12)	2000-04-23	Rainbow Hall, Nagoya, Japan	Retained WBA super-flyweight title
19	Win	16–2–1	Akihiko Nago	UD	12 (12)	1999-11-07	Kokugikan, Tokyo, Japan	Retained WBA super-flyweight title
18	Win	15–2–1	Jesús Rojas	UD	12 (12)	1999-07-31	Rainbow Hall, Nagoya, Japan	Won WBA super-flyweight title
17	Draw	14–2–1	Jesús Rojas	TD	4 (12)	1999-03-28	Prefectural Gymnasium, Miyazaki, Japan	For WBA super-flyweight title
16	Win	14–2	Young Soon Jang	PTS	10 (10)	1998-12-23	Prefectural Gymnasium, Nagoya, Japan	
15	Win	13–2	William Acoyong	TKO	7 (?)	1998-10-31	Nagoya, Japan	
14	Win	12–2	Joji Nobeyama	TKO	10 (10)	1998-07-26	Rainbow Hall, Nagoya, Japan	
13	Win	11–2	Hiroshi Kobayashi	PTS	8 (8)	1998-04-29	Prefectural Gymnasium, Nagoya, Japan	
12	Win	10–2	Jerry Pahayahay	UD	10 (10)	1997-04-20	Miyazaki, Japan	
11	Win	9–2	Ryuji Muramatsu	PTS	10 (10)	1996-09-16	Miyazaki, Japan	Retained Japanese light-flyweight title
10	Win	8–2	Kenzo Ando	PTS	10 (10)	1996-06-03	Green Arena, Hiroshima, Japan	Won vacant Japanese light-flyweight title
9	Win	7–2	Kenji Taniguchi	TKO	7 (?)	1996-04-14	Miyazaki, Japan	
8	Win	6–2	Shozo Yoda	KO	3 (?)	1995-09-30	Nagoya, Japan	
7	Win	5–2	Shigeharu Akitsuki	PTS	6 (6)	1995-05-14	Miyazaki, Japan	
6	Loss	4–2	Eiji Shigeyasu	PTS	6 (6)	1995-04-16	Yamaguchi City, Japan	
5	Win	4–1	Akira Murakami	KO	4 (6)	1995-03-26	Yurix, Munakata, Japan	
4	Loss	3–1	Eiji Shigeyasu	PTS	4 (4)	1994-09-17	Kitakyushu, Japan	
3	Win	3–0	Koji Fujiwara	KO	1 (?)	1994-07-31	Prefectural Gymnasium, Nagoya, Japan	
2	Win	2–0	Hiroshi Morioka	PTS	4 (4)	1994-07-15	Ōita, Japan	
1	Win	1–0	Ichitaro Takada	TKO	2 (?)	1994-06-05	Miyazaki, Japan	

== Post-retirement ==
Todaka currently trains young fighters at the Todaka boxing gym, located in Tokyo, Japan.

== See also ==
- Boxing in Japan
- List of Japanese boxing world champions
- List of world super-flyweight boxing champions

Sporting positions
Regional boxing titles
Vacant Title last held by Takashi Shiohama	Japanese light flyweight champion June 3, 1996 – 1996; Vacated	Vacant Title next held by Hidenobu Honda
World boxing titles
Preceded by Jesús Rojas	WBA super flyweight champion July 31, 1999 – October 9, 2000	Succeeded by Leo Gámez
Vacant Title last held by Eidy Moya	WBA bantamweight champion Interim title October 4, 2003 – March 6, 2004	Succeeded by Julio Zárate
