= Julio Zárate =

Mexican boxer

Personal information
- Nickname: La Sombra
- Born: August 23, 1975 (age 50) Zihuatanejo, Guerrero, Mexico
- Height: 5 ft 7 in (170 cm)
- Weight: Bantamweight; Super bantamweight

Boxing career
- Stance: Orthodox

Boxing record
- Total fights: 39
- Wins: 31
- Win by KO: 18
- Losses: 6
- Draws: 2

Julio Zárate (born August 23, 1975) is a Mexican former professional boxer.

== Professional career ==
Zárate turned professional in 1997 & compiled a record of 21–2–1 before facing & defeating Hideki Todaka, to win the WBA interim bantamweight title. He would challenge for the full title in his next fight against Volodymyr Sydorenko, he would lose via unanimous decision. Zárate would get another shot a world title in his very next fight, this time he would go on to get stopped after 7 rounds against Mahyar Monshipour

== Professional boxing record ==
39 fights	31 wins	6 losses
By knockout	18	1
By decision	13	5
Draws	2	

No.	Result	Record	Opponent	Type	Round, time	Date	Location	Notes
39	Win	31–6–2	Genaro Castorena	UD	8 (8)	2015-05-09	Monterrey, Mexico	
38	Win	30–6–2	Tomas Sierra	SD	8 (8)	2012-09-28	Arena Adolfo López Mateos, Tlalnepantla, Mexico	
37	Win	29–6–2	Francisco Dianzo	TKO	3 (12)	2012-06-07	Discoteca New York, Atlixco, Mexico	
36	Loss	28–6–2	Tomás Rojas	UD	10 (10)	2012-03-03	Auditorio Municipal, Tijuana, Mexico	
35	Win	28–5–2	Gabriel Lopez	TKO	4 (10)	2010-07-29	Discoteca Maximus Quintin, Mexico City, Mexico	
34	Draw	27–5–2	Adolfo Ramos	TD	2 (12)	2010-02-19	Gimnasio Olímpico Juan de la Barrera, Mexico City, Mexico	For vacant WBA Inter-Continental super bantamweight title
33	Win	27–5–1	Robinson Castellanos	SD	10 (10)	2009-07-01	Woda Night Club, Lomas de Sotelo, Mexico	
32	Loss	26–5–1	Jeffrey Mathebula	UD	12 (12)	2008-08-29	Carousel Casino, Hammanskraal, South Africa	
31	Win	26–4–1	Vernie Torres	TKO	4 (10)	2007-11-02	DoubleTree Hotel, Ontario, California, U.S.	
30	Win	25–4–1	Jose Navarrete	TKO	6 (12)	2007-02-23	Parque Revolucion, Culiacan, Mexico	Retained NABF super bantamweight title
29	Win	24–4–1	Giovanny Urbina	TKO	6 (12)	2006-12-23	Palacio de los Deportes, Villahermosa, Mexico	Retained NABF super bantamweight title
28	Win	23–4–1	Antonio Meza	UD	12 (12)	2006-04-08	Gimnasio de Mexicali, Mexicali, Mexico	Won vacant NABF super bantamweight title
27	Win	22–4–1	Francisco Mateos	UD	10 (10)	2005-09-30	Caliente Hipódromo, Tijuana, Mexico	
26	Loss	21–4–1	Mahyar Monshipour	RTD	8 (12)	2005-06-25	Futuroscope, Chasseneuil-du-Poitou, France	For WBA super bantamweight title
25	Loss	21–3–1	Volodymyr Sydorenko	UD	12 (12)	2005-02-26	Color Line Arena, Hamburg, Germany	For vacant WBA bantamweight title
24	Win	21–2–1	Hideki Todaka	SD	12 (12)	2004-03-06	Super Arena, Saitama, Japan	Won interim WBA bantamweight title
23	Win	20–2–1	Oscar Andrade	MD	10 (10)	Nov 15, 2003	Alamodome, San Antonio, Texas, U.S.	
22	Win	19–2–1	Cesar Ricardo Martinez	KO	4 (12)	2003-09-20	Salon La Maraka, Mexico City, Mexico	
21	Win	18–2–1	Oscar Arciniega	TKO	6 (12)	2003-07-12	Salon La Maraka, Mexico City, Mexico	
20	Draw	17–2–1	Julio Cesar Avila	TD	2 (12)	2003-03-29	El Palenque de la Feria, Pachuca, Mexico	Retained Mexican bantamweight title
19	Win	17–2	Luis Perez Vicente	TKO	8 (12)	2003-03-01	Discoteca El Triangulo, Cuernavaca, Mexico	
18	Win	16–2	Francisco Mateos	TKO	7 (12)	2002-08-30	La Boom Discoteque, Mexico City, Mexico	Won vacant Mexican bantamweight title
17	Win	15–2	Don Brockington	TKO	1 (8)	2001-07-10	Salon 21, Mexico City, Mexico	
16	Win	14–2	Julio Cesar Cardona	KO	4 (12)	2001-05-15	Mexico City, Mexico	Won vacant WBC Continental Americas bantamweight title
15	Win	13–2	Juan Carlos Lopez	KO	8 (12)	2001-01-05	Mexico City, Mexico	Retained WBC FECARBOX bantamweight title
14	Win	12–2	Erik López	TKO	10 (12)	2000-10-06	Mexico City, Mexico	Won vacant WBC FECARBOX bantamweight title
13	Win	11–2	Jose Antonio Moreno	TKO	2 (?)	2000-07-07	Mexico	
12	Win	10–2	Gerardo Rubin	TKO	3 (8)	2000-04-01	Arena México, Mexico City, Mexico	
11	Win	9–2	Marco Acevedo	TKO	1 (?)	2000-02-07	Ensenada, Mexico	
10	Win	8–2	Julio Cesar Ruiz	SD	6 (6)	1999-07-28	Salon 21, Mexico City, Mexico	
9	Win	7–2	Mucio Castillo	TD	6 (6)	1999-06-09	Salon 21, Mexico City, Mexico	
8	Win	6–2	Jorge Ramos	PTS	6 (6)	1998-11-06	Mexico	
7	Loss	5–2	Jesus Periban	PTS	6 (6)	1998-05-28	Lomas de Sotelo, Mexico	
6	Loss	5–1	Juan Carlos Brena	UD	6 (6)	1998-03-10	Discoteca La Boom, Lomas de Sotelo, Mexico	
5	Win	5–0	Victor Jimenez	PTS	6 (6)	1997-10-21	Discoteca La Boom, Lomas de Sotelo, Mexico	
4	Win	4–0	Ismael Garcia	KO	2 (?)	1997-08-15	Guadalajara, Mexico	
3	Win	3–0	Abraham Reyes	PTS	4 (4)	1997-06-03	Mexico City, Mexico	
2	Win	2–0	Abel Vargas	PTS	4 (4)	1997-04-22	Mexico	
1	Win	1–0	Enrique Reyes	TKO	2 (4)	1997-03-11	Mexico	

Sporting positions
Regional boxing titles
Vacant Title last held by Roger Gonzalez	WBC FECARBOX bantamweight champion October 6, 2000 – 2001; Vacated	Vacant Title next held by Ricardo Medina
Vacant Title last held by Genaro García	WBC Continental Americas bantamweight champion May 15, 2001 – 2001; Vacated	Vacant Title next held by Jhonny González
Vacant Title last held by Cruz Carbajal	Mexican bantamweight champion August 30, 2002 – 2014; Vacated	Vacant Title next held by Jhonny González
Vacant Title last held by Adam Carrera	NABF super bantamweight champion April 8, 2006 – 2007; Vacated	Vacant Title next held by Bernabe Concepcion
World boxing titles
Preceded by Hideki Todaka	WBA bantamweight champion Interim title March 6, 2004 – February 26, 2005; Lost bid for full title	Vacant Title next held by Poonsawat Kratingdaenggym
