= Jesús Rojas (Venezuelan boxer) =

Venezuelan boxer

Jesus Rojas
Personal information
- Nickname: Kiki
- Born: Jesus Rojas; January 31, 1964 (age 62) Río Caribe, Venezuela
- Height: 5 ft 6 in (168 cm)
- Weight: Flyweight; Super flyweight

Boxing career
- Stance: Orthodox

Boxing record
- Total fights: 51
- Wins: 36
- Win by KO: 20
- Losses: 10
- Draws: 4
- No contests: 1

Jesus 'Kiki' Rojas (born 31 January 1964) is a Venezuelan former professional boxer who competed from 1985 to 2004. He is a world champion in two weight classes, having held the World Boxing Association (WBA) flyweight title from 1989 to 1990 and the WBA super flyweight title from 1998 to 1999.

== Professional boxing career ==
Rojas turned professional in 1985 and captured the WBA flyweight title with a decision win over Fidel Bassa in 1989. He lost the title in his first defense to Yul-Woo Lee by decision in 1990. Later that year he took on Leopard Tamakuma again for the WBA flyweight title, but drew with him. He later moved up in weight and challenged WBA super flyweight title holder Yokthai Sithoar in 1997, but lost a decision. In 1998 he captured the WBA super flyweight title, with a decision win over Satoshi Iida. He lost the title in 1999 to Hideki Todaka and later retired in 2004 after a loss to Eric Morel.

== Professional boxing record ==
51 fights	36 wins	10 losses
By knockout	20	0
By decision	16	10
Draws	4	
No contests	1	

No.	Result	Record	Opponent	Type	Round, time	Date	Location	Notes
51	Loss	37–10–3 (1)	Eric Morel	UD	12	Mar 20, 2004	Coliseo Mario Morales, Guaynabo, Puerto Rico	For vacant WBO NABO super flyweight title
50	Win	37–9–3 (1)	Emilio Castro	KO	2 (10)	Nov 29, 2003	El Velodromo Teo Capriles, Caracas, Velenzuela	
49	Draw	36–9–3 (1)	Edison Torres	SD	10	Sep 8, 2003	Parcque Naciones Unidas, Caracas, Velenzuela	
48	Loss	36–9–2 (1)	Celes Kobayashi	SD	12	Sep 1, 2001	Arena, Yokohama, Japan	For WBA super flyweight title
47	Win	36–8–2 (1)	Francisco Gomez	TKO	3 (?)	Mar 20, 2001	Las Tejerias, Venezuela	
46	Win	35–8–2 (1)	Roger Guevara	TKO	1 (?)	May 21, 2000	Puerto La Cruz, Venezuela	
45	Win	34–8–2 (1)	Hideyasu Ichira	KO	7 (10)	Mar 19, 2000	International Conference Hall, Nagoya, Japan	
44	Loss	33–8–2 (1)	Hideki Todaka	UD	12	Jul 31, 1999	Rainbow Hall, Nagoya, Japan	Lost WBA super flyweight title
43	Draw	33–7–2 (1)	Hideki Todaka	TD	4 (12)	Mar 28, 1999	Prefectural Gym, Miyazaki, Japan	Retained WBA super flyweight title
42	Win	33–7–1 (1)	Satoshi Iida	UD	12	Dec 23, 1998	Aichi Prefectural Gym, Nagoya, Japan	Won WBA super flyweight title
41	Win	32–7–1 (1)	Evangelio Perez	TKO	7 (12)	Oct 3, 1998	Gimnasio Jose Beracasa, Caracas, Venezuela	Won WBA Fedelatin super flyweight title
40	Win	31–7–1 (1)	Saul Guaza	TKO	2 (?)	May 30, 1998	Los Teques, Venezuela	
39	Loss	30–7–1 (1)	Yokthai Sithoar	UD	12	Aug 8, 1997	Emerald Hotel, Bangkok, Thailand	For WBA super flyweight title
38	Win	30–6–1 (1)	David Serradas	TKO	10 (12)	May 17, 1997	Los Teques, Venezuela	Retained WBA Fedebol super flyweight title
37	Win	29–6–1 (1)	David Grimán	PTS	12	Feb 17, 1996	Los Teques, Venezuela	Retained WBA Fedebol super flyweight title; Won vacant Venezuelan super flyweight title
36	Win	28–6–1 (1)	David Grimán	PTS	12	Nov 11, 1995	Caracas, Venezuela	Won WBA Fedebol super flyweight title
35	Win	27–6–1 (1)	Takashi Oba	TKO	7 (10)	May 6, 1995	Korakuen Hall, Tokyo, Japan	
34	Loss	26–6–1 (1)	Danny Nunez	UD	12	Apr 10, 1994	Jai Alai Fronton, Miami, Florida, U.S.	For WBA Fedecentro flyweight title
33	Loss	26–5–1 (1)	Saen Sor Ploenchit	UD	12	Apr 10, 1994	Anusom Stadium, Samut Prakan, Thailand	For WBA flyweight title
32	Win	26–4–1 (1)	José Bonilla	TKO	11 (12)	Nov 26, 1993	Puerto La Cruz, Venezuela	Won WBA Fedelatin flyweight title
31	Win	25–4–1 (1)	Dunoy Pena	TKO	4 (?)	Jun 30, 1993	Caracas, Venezuela	
30	Win	24–4–1 (1)	Puma Toguchi	TKO	9 (10)	Apr 20, 1993	Tokyo, Japan	
29	Win	23–4–1 (1)	Rafael Torres	UD	10	Dec 12, 1992	Jai Alai Fronton, Miami, Florida, U.S.	
28	Win	22–4–1 (1)	Oscar Bolivar	PTS	10	Jun 27, 1992	Turmero, Venezuela	
27	Loss	21–4–1 (1)	Oscar Bolivar	UD	10	Feb 22, 1992	Grand Chaparrel, El Tigre, Venezuela	
26	Loss	21–3–1 (1)	Julio Godino	PTS	10	Apr 6, 1991	Turmero, Venezuela	
25	Draw	21–2–1 (1)	Leopard Tamakuma	MD	12	Dec 6, 1990	Prefectural Gym, Aomori, Japan	For WBA flyweight title
24	Win	21–1–1 (1)	Edison Torres	PTS	10	Aug 18, 1990	Turmero, Venezuela	
23	Loss	20–1–1 (1)	Lee Yul-woo	SD	12	Mar 10, 1990	Chungmu Gymnasium, Daejeon, South Korea	Lost WBA flyweight title
22	Win	20–0–1 (1)	Fidel Bassa	SD	12	Sep 30, 1989	Coliseo Humberto Perea, Barranquiella, Venezuela	Won WBA flyweight title
21	Win	19–0–1 (1)	Manuel Sayago	UD	10	Aug 5, 1989	Turmero, Venezuela	
20	Win	18–0–1 (1)	Pedro Jose Feliciano	KO	4 (?)	Mar 13, 1989	Turmero, Venezuela	
19	Win	17–0–1 (1)	Carlos Perez	PTS	10	Apr 15, 1989	Turmero, Venezuela	
18	Win	16–0–1 (1)	Jin Yoon Un	PTS	10	Mar 1, 1989	88 Gymnasium, Seoul, South Korea	
17	Win	15–0–1 (1)	Victoriano Hernandez	PTS	10	Jan 14, 1989	Turmero, Venezuela	
16	Win	14–0–1 (1)	Mauricio Bernal	PTS	10	Nov 26, 1988	Turmero, Venezuela	
15	Win	13–0–1 (1)	Rafael Julio	TKO	4 (?)	Jul 2, 1988	Maracaibo, Venezuela	
14	Win	12–0–1 (1)	Roger Guevara	KO	1 (?)	Jun 4, 1988	Turmero, Venezuela	
13	Win	11–0–1 (1)	Yasutaka Sakurai	KO	8 (10)	Apr 24, 1988	Korakuen Hall, Tokyo, Japan	
12	Win	10–0–1 (1)	Victoriano Hernandez	TKO	9 (?)	Mar 26, 1988	Turmero, Venezuela	
11	Win	9–0–1 (1)	Jose G Castillo	PTS	10	Feb 5, 1988	Turmero, Venezuela	
10	Win	8–0–1 (1)	Orlando Maestre	PTS	10	Aug 8, 1987	Caraballeda, Venezuela	
9	NC	7–0–1 (1)	Orlando Maestre	NC	2 (6)	Mar 21, 1987	Palo Verde, Venezuela	
8	Draw	7–0–1	Victoriano Hernandez	PTS	8	Dec 13, 1986	Porlamar, Venezuela	
7	Win	7–0	Rafael Lara	TKO	1 (?)	Nov 10, 1986	Turmero, Venezuela	
6	Win	6–0	Aquiles Guzman	PTS	6	Sep 22, 1986	Maracay, Venezuela	
5	Win	5–0	Limbor Villalobos	TKO	5 (?)	Aug 1, 1986	Palo Verde, Venezuela	
4	Win	4–0	Jesus Nieto	TKO	1 (?)	May 30, 1986	Porlamar, Venezuela	
3	Win	3–0	Juan Blanco	TKO	3 (?)	Mar 22, 1986	Macuto Sheraton Hotel, Caraballeda, Venezuela	
2	Win	2–0	Jose G Castillo	PTS	4	Oct 17, 1985	Turmero, Venezuela	
1	Win	1–0	Francisco Alavarez	PTS	4	Sep 13, 1985	Maracay, Venezuela	

== Titles in boxing ==
=== Major world titles ===
- WBA flyweight champion (112 lbs)
- WBA super flyweight champion (115 lbs)

=== Regional/International titles ===
- WBA Fedelatin flyweight champion (112 lbs)
- Venezuelan super flyweight champion (115 lbs)
- WBA Fedebol super flyweight champion (115 lbs)
- WBA Fedelatin super flyweight champion (115 lbs)

== See also ==
- List of flyweight boxing champions
- List of super-flyweight boxing champions

Achievements
Preceded by Fidel Bassa	WBA flyweight champion September 30, 1989 – March 10, 1990	Succeeded by Lee Yul-woo
Preceded by Satoshi Iida	WBA super flyweight champion December 23, 1998 – July 31, 1999	Succeeded by Hideki Todaka
