= Pelota (boat) =

Improvised hide boat used in South and Central America

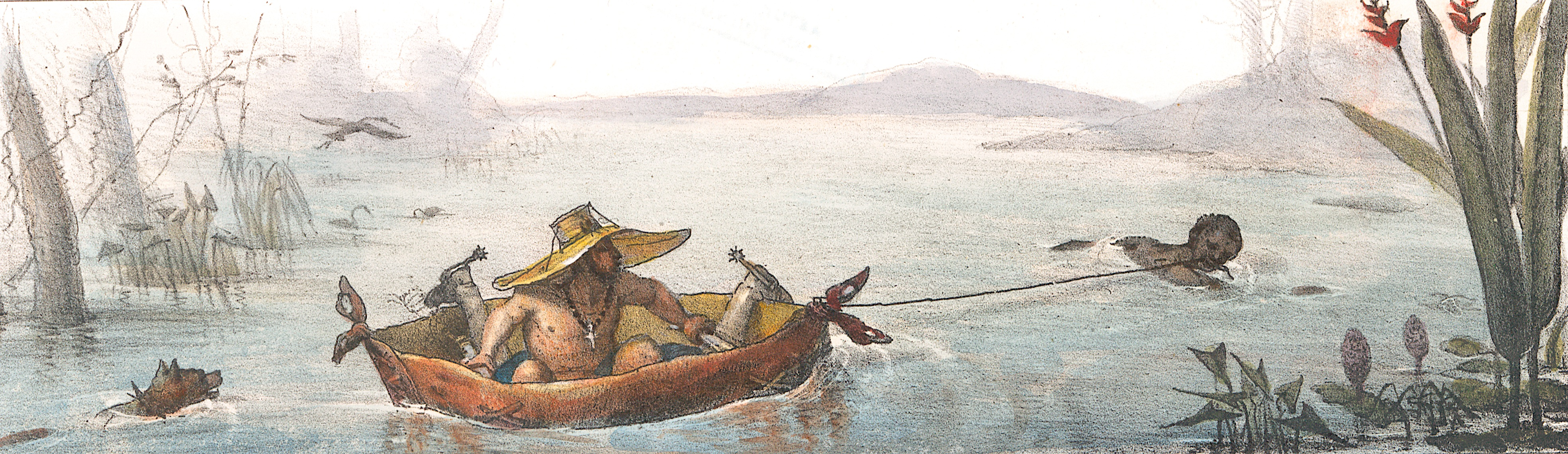
Crossing a Brazilian river in a pelota. The artist has drawn internal bracing sticks, which were not necessary and rarely used. (Jean-Baptiste Debret, Voyage Pittoresque et Historique au Brésil.) Pelota-towing was a profession.

A pelota was an improvised rawhide boat used in South and Central America for crossing rivers. It was similar in some respects to the coracle of the British Isles or the bull boat of North America, but it had little or no wooden framework or internal supporting structure, often relying entirely on the stiffness of the hide and the packing of the cargo to keep it open and afloat. Thus, the hide could be carried about on horseback and set up quickly in an emergency, a commonplace rural skill. The vessel was towed by an animal, or by a human swimmer gripping a cord with the teeth, who had to be careful not to swamp it, women being considered particularly dexterous. Pelotas could convey substantial loads—around a quarter of a ton was common—and even small artillery pieces. They continued to be used well into the 20th century.

== Necessity ==
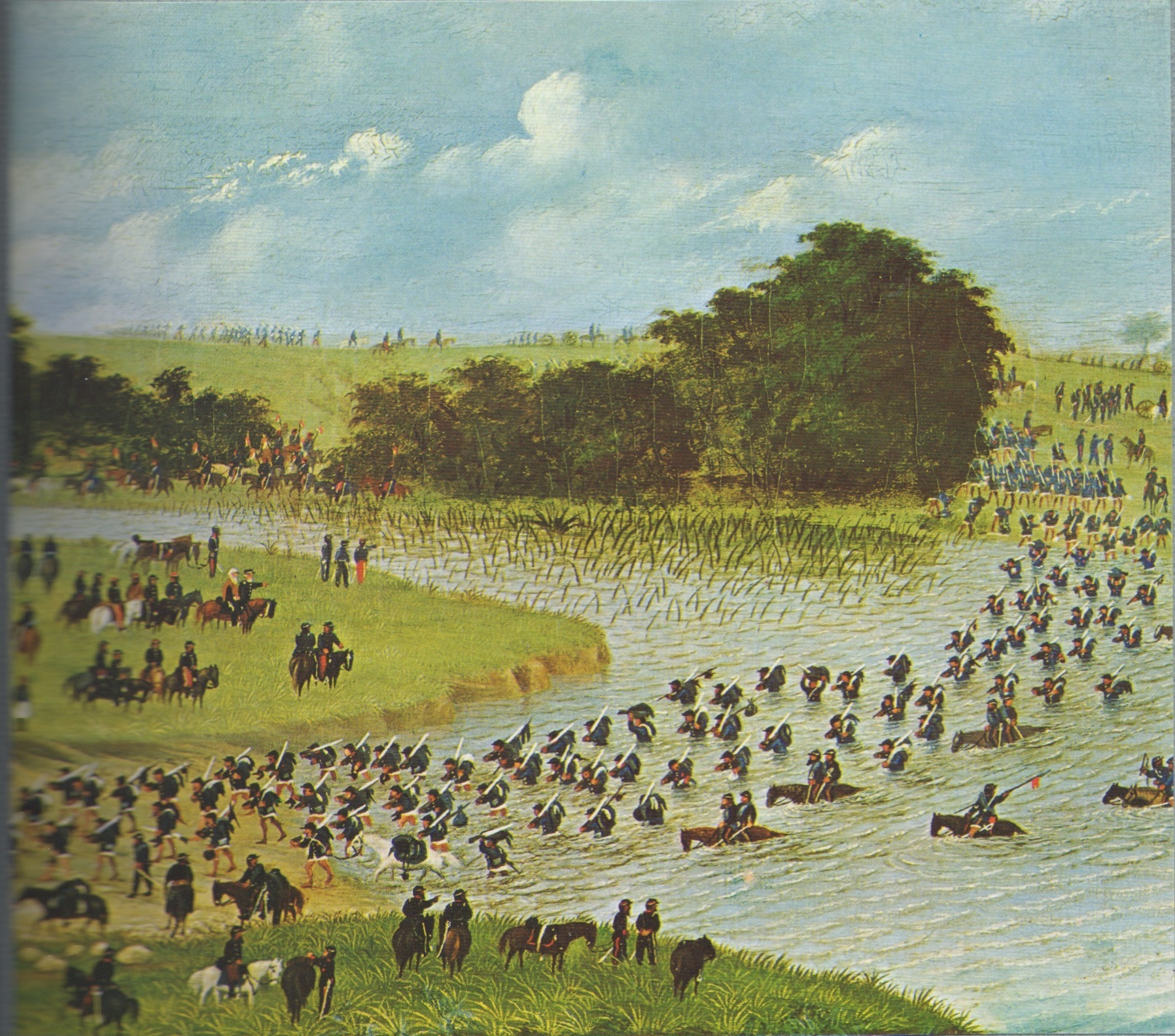
Fording the San Joaquín (detail), Cándido López, oil on canvas, Museo Nacional Histórico

There were few bridges in these regions and rivers had to be forded or, if too deep, crossed in a boat, which might well be unavailable. To cross a river in an emergency e.g. when swollen by torrential rains or during a military campaign, travellers on horseback had to employ such means as were to hand. They were unlikely to be carrying timber, which in some regions e.g. the treeless pampas might be hard to procure. Ox-hides were common, however, and many travellers were in the habit of carrying one under their saddle. (The native recado is a saddle applied in multiple superposed layers, one of which is a large square sheet of rawhide.)

Wrote botanist Augustin Saint-Hilaire:

Since I left the province of Santa Catarina [Brazil], I had travelled about six hundred leagues, and I had crossed a country cut by numerous rivers; part of this country is rich and flourishing, and yet I did not see a single bridge, sometimes I did not even find any canoe on the banks of the rivers. When this happens, the inhabitants of the country take a rawhide, they knot the four corners of it, and thus form a sort of rounded boat (pelota), to which they attach a strap. Anyone who wants to cross the water sits in this type of canoe and remains motionless while a swimmer, holding the strap between his teeth, pulls it until he reaches the other bank. I have had luggage transported in this way, often very heavy

though he was reluctant to entrust his rich collection of specimens to this means of conveyance.

== Construction ==
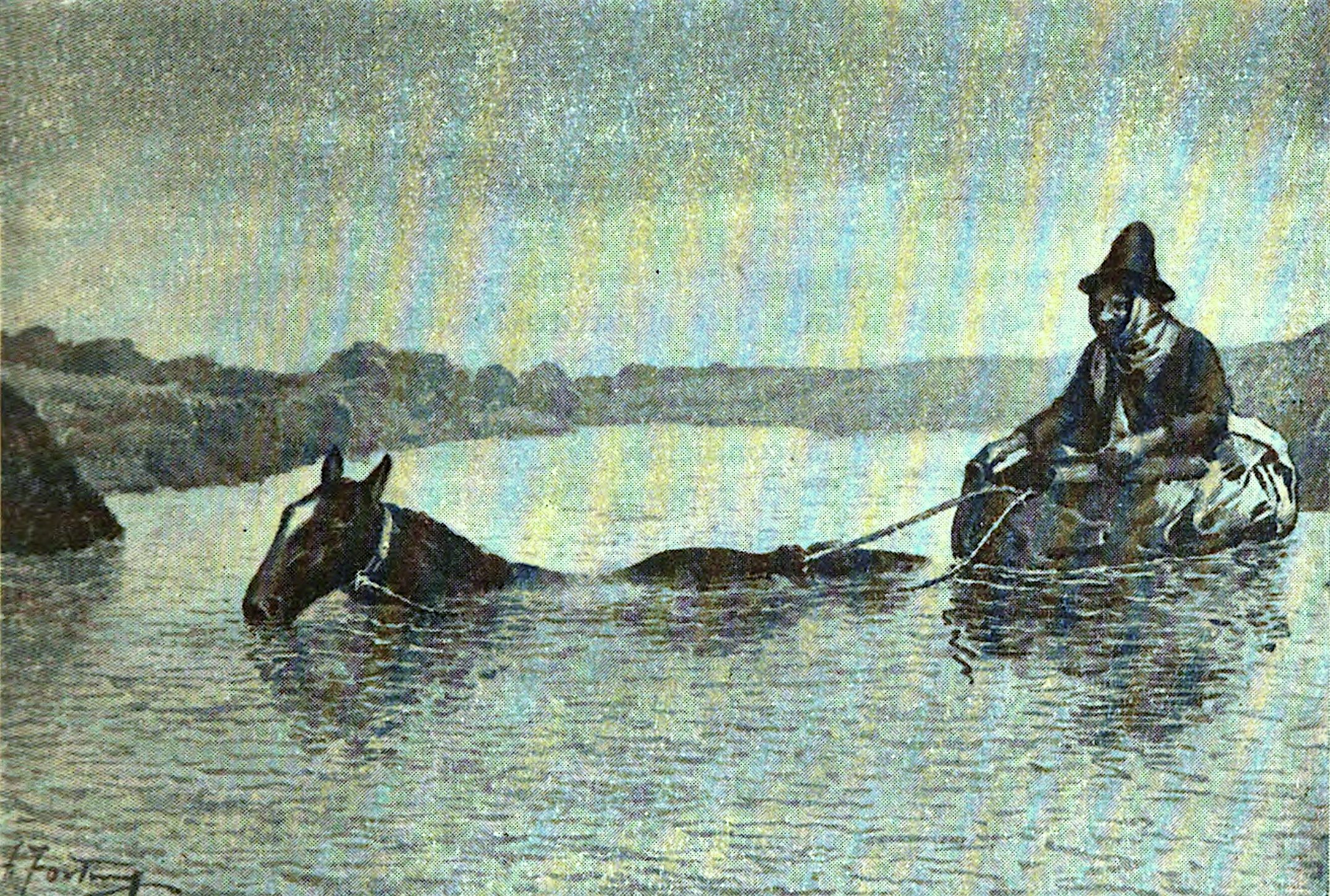
Crossing the Luján River, Argentina. The bridge - the only one in the province - often washed away.

A sun-dried rawhide is inherently rather stiff, and tends to curve preferentially with the hairy side outwards. The legs were cut off to form a roughly rectangular structure and tied at the four corners to increase its curvature.

In some cases a refinement was employed. Since animal hides were habitually dried by staking them out on the ground, they came with peg-holes along the margins. By passing a cord through these eyelets, the curvature could be further enhanced - like tightening a purse-string. The vessel has been compared to the gigantic water-lily of the Amazon. Martin Dobrizhoffer, a Jesuit missionary in Paraguay, recorded that the four sides were raised "like the upturned brim of a hat", a distance of about 2 spans. Sometimes, a few sticks were inserted for internal support, but this was not usually necessary, or always possible.

If no cowhide was available, one might be procured by slaughtering an animal on the spot and skinning it. Since this hide lacked stiffness, however, it was necessary to vary the construction. The skin was stuffed with, and tied around, a bundle of straw, and only served as a rudimentary float.

=== Stiffness ===
If the hide was allowed to get wet through, it tended to become soft and pliable, hence useless. Then it was necessary to dry it out, or to use bracing sticks if these could be found.

Félix de Azara, a Spanish colonial official whose duties compelled him to travel through remote regions and who often used the pelota to cross rivers, complained in his travel diary that torrential rains not only caused flooding but gradually made the pelota useless.

It was said that if a pelota should take too long to cross a river, as might happen if the towing swimmer grew tired, or lost his hold, the hide would soften up and the vessel might sink.

== Propulsion ==
The hide boat was towed across the river, either by a swimmer pulling a cord with his teeth, or by a bullock, or by holding onto the tail of a horse. In the Mato Grosso a second swimmer helped to guide it and push it from behind.

The French traveller de Moussy, who rode very extensively over Argentina, wrote:

This way of crossing rivers was naturally perilous, and more than one accident, sometimes fatal, was the result; but every Argentine countryman knew how to do it and did not hesitate to put it into practice.

Several other sources indicate it was an common rural skill.

=== Professional pelota towers ===
The Spanish Empire established a mail service linking Buenos Aires in the Atlantic world with Lima in the Pacific. Posts were set up at intervals along this 3,000 miles (4,800 km) route where fresh horses could be obtained and there was (very) basic sleeping accommodation. They were often beside rivers. At each place a postmaster was put in charge who was supposed to keep at least 50 horses; he or she got no salary but was rewarded with valuable legal privileges. Private voyagers were encouraged to travel with the mail, being forbidden to take their own horses.

Where the rivers were too deep to be forded the postal service appointed pasadores (passers) whose function was to carry passengers and mail across in pelotas. Pasadores were not allowed to charge much for the mail but were able to recoup themselves from the private travellers. Thus, at some places there were official pelota towers - persons who swam across rivers and pulled the boat with their teeth - whose charges were regulated by law.

The most notable crossing was at the Río del Pasage or Pasaje (today called the Juramento River), which lay on the road between Tucumán and Salta. It could be forded quite easily in the dry season, but when the waters rose it grew wide and deep, with strong currents and eventually, turbulent waves. An artillery officer wrote that the river brought down logs that endangered pelota and swimmer alike; the latter had to be adept to dodge them. He recorded that the service was still functioning in 1833; a bridge would have been much better, but had not been built owing to bureaucratic inertia. At this spot Indian women were celebrated pelota towers. It is not clear when the service ceased to function, but no bridge was built until 1926.

==== Women ====
At this pass the local women were reputed the best swimmers, their dextrous handling of the pelotas being "justly admired"; according to Sir Woodbine Parish they were extremely expert at guiding these "frail barks" across the stream; indeed according to the French geographer Martin de Moussy, in that region "they had a monopoly on this singular industry". Likewise, Domingo Faustino Sarmiento, though he grew up in a completely different part of the country, upon reading James Fenimore Cooper, remarked

When the fugitives in The Prairie arrive at a river, and Cooper describes the mysterious way in which the Pawnee gathers together the buffalo's hide, "he is making a pelota," said I to myself, — "it is a pity there is no woman to tow it," — for among us [Argentines] it is the women who tow pelotas across rivers with lassos held between their teeth.

== Sensation ==
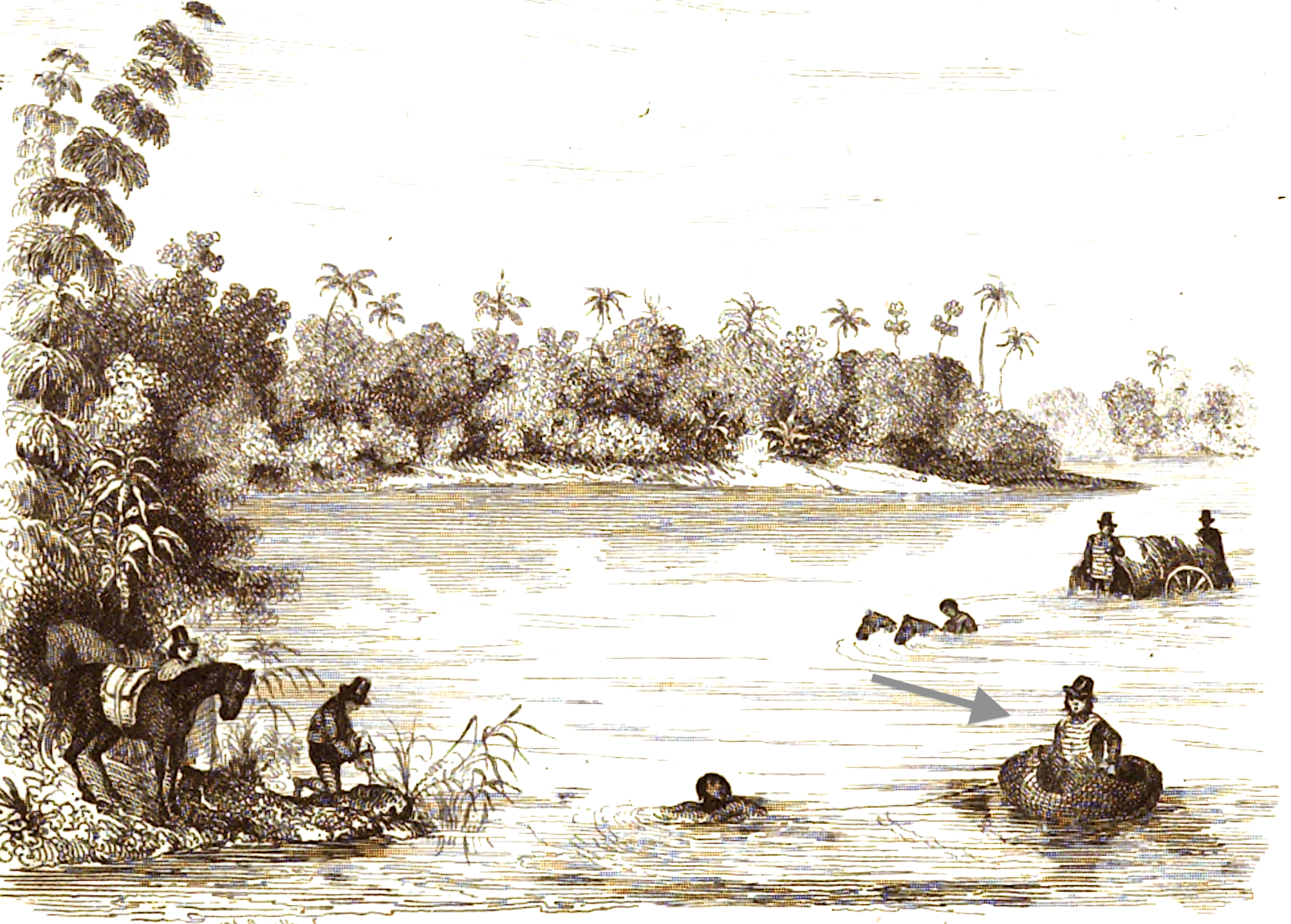
Crossing a river in Paraguay c. 1830 (d'Orbigny, Voyage Pittoresque dans les Deux Amériques)

The sensation of crossing a river in a pelota was described by naturalist Alcide d'Orbigny.

They loaded my firearms and two trunks and I sat on one of them. The towing horse lost his footing, which made me realise that the slightest movement could make me sink: I would have preferred to cross on horseback a thousand times. But, I got used to it; it seemed quite a comfortable vehicle, and I even felt disposed to cross any river, in spite of my boat's flexibility, which gave way at the slightest change of posture—it obliged me to keep perfectly still. Several times the man towing me disappeared underwater with his horse, but my boat floated on, though it became so deformed that I ended up finding myself at the bottom of a sort of funnel, where I could barely move.

It took d'Orbigny an hour to reach the opposite bank. Jesuit missionary Florian Paucke, who was towed across by a 15-year old youth, noticed that his flock was careful to see he was evenly balanced first.

The freeboard was small. "He that sits on it must keep his balance well, for on the slightest movement he will find himself underwater". That the user had to keep absolutely still to avoid rolling the contrivance, or risk sinking, was stressed by more than one author.

== Utility ==
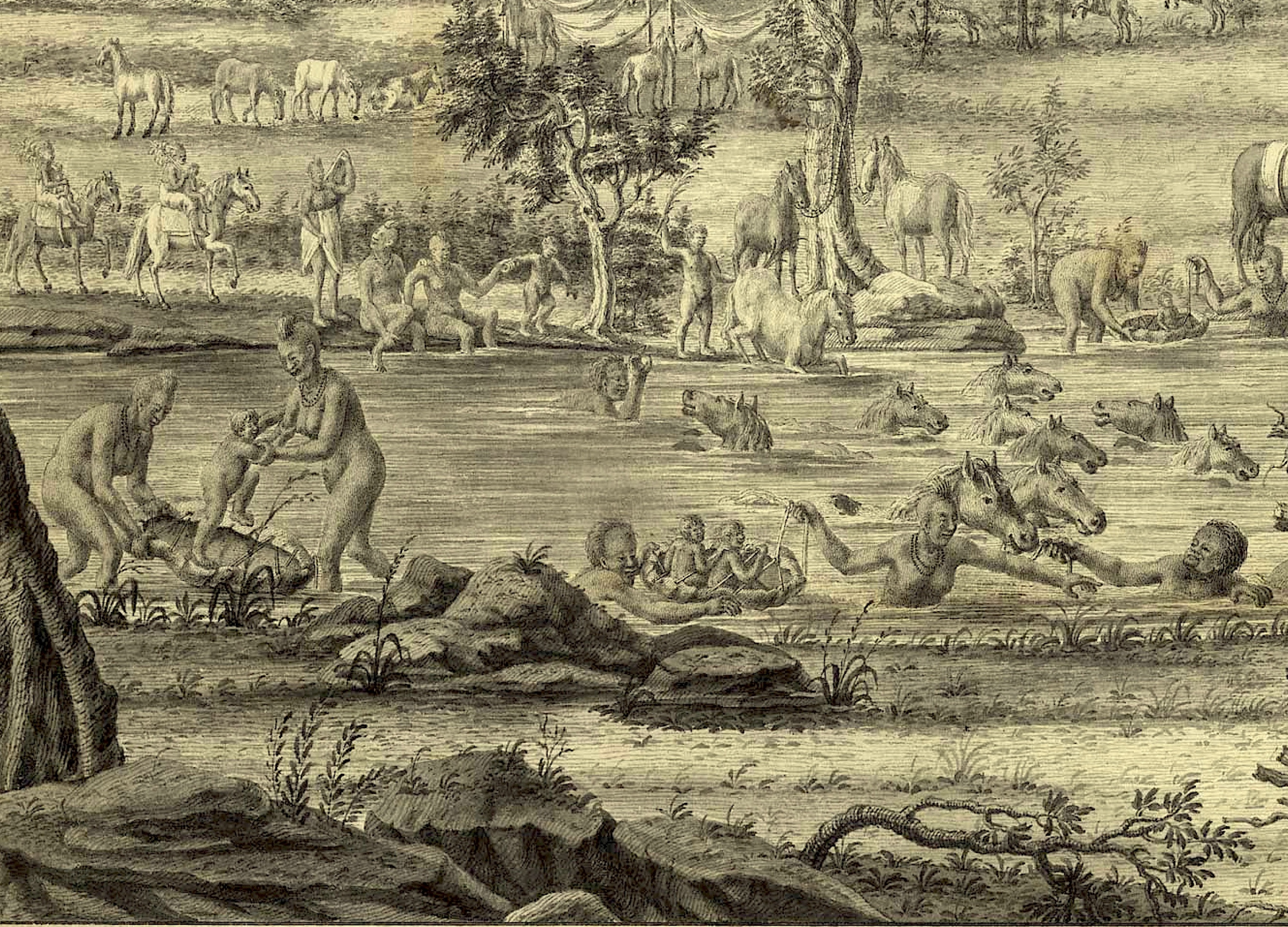
Guaicurú people crossing a river c. 1785 carrying their children in pelotas

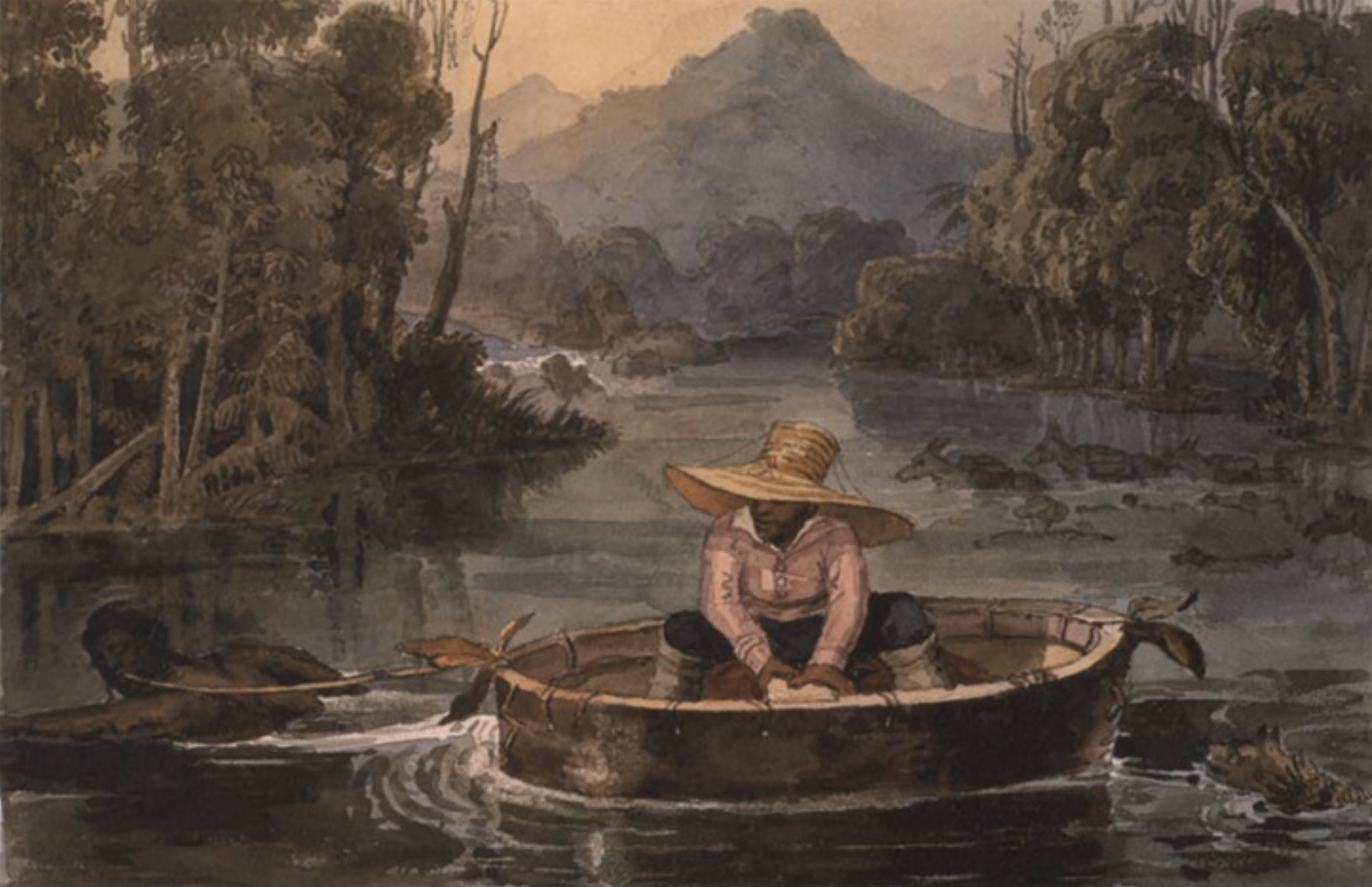
Jean-Baptiste Debret, Mineiro crossing river. In this particular example the vessel has the luxury of a wooden gunwale.

The boat served for transporting clothing and gear that one wanted to keep dry, or cargo which must not get wet e.g. ammunition.

It also served to convey those who could not swim, or would not. In the colonial era, Spanish military commanders, though they knew how to swim, held it was beneath their dignity to strip in front of the common soldiery, and were conveyed by pelota; "scorning the assistance of another person, they impel forwards by two forked boughs for oars". The Rodrigues Ferreira expedition to the Mato Grosso (c. 1785) drew indigenous people taking their children across in pelotas, propelled by pairs of women.

In the tropical Brazil they could be used for rivers that, though fordable, contained dangerous fish.

A pelota could carry two men. Azara wrote that it could easily carry a load of 16 to 25 arrobas (180 to 280) kilos. Azara felt it was safer than a native canoe, and so did Father Dobrizhoffer. Military stores and even (small) artillery pieces could be conveyed across rivers. During the Paraguayan War they were used by a Brazilian reconnaissance expedition in the Pantanal.

As noted, the postal service in colonial and newly independent Argentina appointed official pelota towers. Some of them took the mail across rivers a mile or more across.

General Manuel Belgrano recalled taking a small revolutionary army across the Corriente River in 1811 with nothing but two bad canoes and some pelotas. The river was about a cuadra (80 metres) wide, and unfordable. He noted that most of his men knew how to use a pelota, implying that it was standard rural know-how.

Not all countrymen knew how to swim, however: it depended on the region. The cavalry troopers of General Paz were from the Province of Corrientes, where everyone did. Crossing a river at night, holding on to the manes or tails of their swimming horses - their arms, ammunition, uniforms and saddles safely dry in pelotas, which they had improvised from rawhide saddle blankets - they surprised and defeated the enemy at the Battle of Caaguazú.

== Origins and diffusion ==
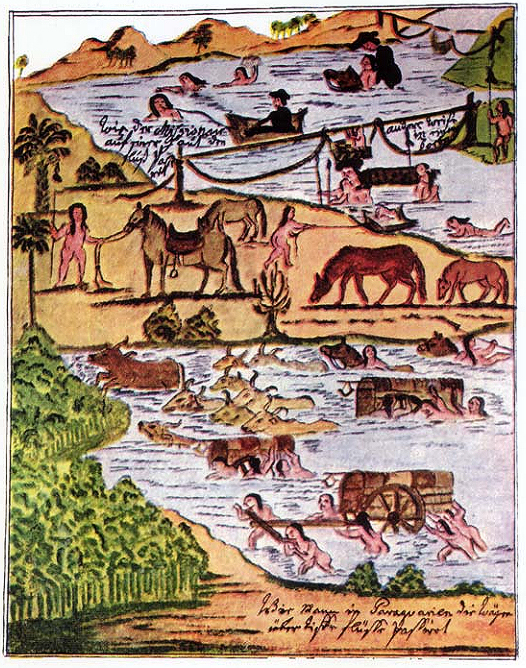
Indian modes of crossing rivers, recalled by Florian Paucke S.J. The pelota is upper centre.

Its origin is uncertain, but it may have pre-dated the Columbian exchange. Some have denied this, arguing that the indigenous peoples lacked domestic animals that could provide a large, strong hide. Another view is that they sewed several small camelid hides together: after the Spanish introduced cattle and horses, this became unnecessary.

James Hornell thought that pelota knowledge spread with human migration along the eastern seaboard of South America and inland. There is evidence it was known to an indigenous people of Patagonia who had never seen a Spaniard.

In the 1890s it could be found in most parts of Brazil, and in Central America.

Even in the 20th century the pelota could be found

on the llanos of Colombia and Venezuela, in Matto Grosso, and Rio Grande do Sul, in Uruguay, on the rivers of the pampas of the Argentine and Paraguay, and by the Mojos or Moxos of northern Bolivia. Southern Bolivia has also to be added .. Southward it ranges (or ranged) almost to the farthest limits of Patagonia.

== Classification ==
The use of inflated skins as swimming-floats (whence, raft-supports) is ancient, and widely distributed in many human cultures. However the floats are intended to be airtight, for which purpose the skin should be removed from the animal with as few incisions as possible, and must be made wet and pliable.

The pelota, on the other hand, was an open boat that resembled the coracle of the British Isles or the bull boat of North America, but lacked the internal supporting framework of those vessels, except insofar as a few sticks might be added as bracing. (Unlike the pelota, the hide of the bull boat was soft and pliable, and was applied to the supporting wicker framework with hair side facing inwards.) Since the pelota was not a permanent structure but a recourse, it can also be thought of as a skilled voyaging procedure rather than a boat.

In the classification of McGrail, the pelota together with the Mongol hide boat (below) seem to stand in a class of their own, since both were made from a single hide and kept to shape by the internal pressure of the cargo.

=== Mongolian parallel ===
The nearest parallel in human culture would appear to be the hun-t'o of medieval Mongolia. Iohannes de Plano Carpini, who went there in 1246, said:

When they come to a river, they cross it in the following manner, even if it is wide. The nobles have a circular piece of light leather, round the edge of which they make numerous loops, through which they thread a rope; they draw this up so that it makes a pouch, which they fill with their clothes and other things, pressing them down very tightly together; on top of these, in the middle, they put their saddles and other hard things. The men also sit in the middle and they tie the boat they have made in this way to the tail of a horse. They make one man swim in front with the horse to guide it...

== Nomenclature ==
There is no specific word for this vessel. The Spanish word pelota is general, meaning a round object. It is sometimes specified more precisely as pelota de cuero (hide ball), but this can still mean a football. The Dictionary of the Royal Spanish Academy has the verb pelotear, to cross a river on a pelota, but it can also mean to bounce from place to place, a victim of buck-passing bureaucracy.

In Brazil it was also called pelota, but in Bahia it was called banguê in the indigenous language.

In parts of South America the boat was called a balsa but this is an only general word that can include raft or inflatable lifejacket. Amongst the Chiquitos people of Bolivia it was called natae; amongst the Abipones of the Chaco, ñataċ.

== Eponym ==
The city of Pelotas, Brazil (pop. c. 350,000) is thought to have derived its name from the water craft, used in the 18th century for crossing a local stream.

== Sources ==
- Arenales, José (1833). Noticias históricas y descriptivas sobre el gran país del Chaco y río Bermejo; con observaciones relativas á un plan de navegación y colonización que se propone (in Spanish). Buenos Aires: Hallet y Ca.
- Azara, Félix de (1873). Viajes Inéditos: desde Santa Fe a la Asunción, al interior del Paraguay, y a los pueblos de Misiones (in Spanish). Buenos Aires: Librería de Mayo.
- Belgrano, Manuel (May 1867). "Descripción Histórica de la Antigua Provincia del Paraguay: Memoria del Jeneral Belgrano sobre su espedicion al Paraguay en 1811". La Revista de Buenos Aires: Historia Americana, Literatura y Derecho (in Spanish). Vol. 13, no. 49.
- Biscay, Acarete du (1698). An Account of a Voyage up the River de la Plata and thence over Land to Peru. London: Samuel Buckley.
- Bosé, Walter B.L. (1966). "Las postas en las provincias del Norte y Cuyo en la época del Congreso de Tucumán" (PDF). Memoria Académica (in Spanish). 15: 107–134.
- Bosé, Walter B.L. (1970). "Las postas en las provincias de Santa Fe, Entre Ríos, Corrientes y Misiones (1772-1820)" (PDF). Memoria Académica (in Spanish). 20: 87–130.
- Camara, Antonio Alves (1888). Ensaio sobre as construcções navaes indígenas do Brasil (in Portuguese). Rio de Janeiro: O. Leuzinqer & Filhos.
- Cárcano, Ramón J. (1893). Historia de los Medios de Comunicación y Transporte de la República Argentina (in Spanish). Vol. I. Buenos Aires: Félix Lajoune.
- Chome, Padre (1756). "Carta del Padre Chome S.J. al Padre Vanthiennen S.J., 26 Septiembre de 1730". Cartas edificantes, y curiosas, escritas de las missiones estrangeras, y de levante por algunos missioneros de la Compañia de Jesus (in Spanish). Vol. XIII. Translated by Diego Davin. Madrid: Imprenta de la Viuda de Manuel Fernandez, y del Supremo Consejo de la Inquisicion.
- de Moussy, Martin (1860). Description Géographique et Statistique de la Confédération Argentine (in French). Vol. II. Paris: Libraire de Firmin Didot Fréres, Fils et Cie.
- d'Orbigny, Alcide (1945). Viaje a la América Meridional (in Spanish). Vol. I. Buenos Aires: Editorial Futuro.
- Dobrizhoffer, Martin (1822). An Account of the Abipones, an Equestrian People of Paraguay. Vol. II. London: John Murray.
- Echevarría, Cecilio; Contreras, Ramón (1875). Informe acerca de la provincia de Corrientes presentado a la comisión directiva de la Exposición Nacional de Córdoba en 1871 (in Spanish). Buenos Aires.
- Hornell, James (1941). "The Pelota or Hide-Balsa of South America". Man. 41: 27–30. doi:10.2307/2791412. JSTOR 2791412.
- Hornell, James (1942). "Floats: A Study in Primitive Water-Transport". The Journal of the Royal Anthropological Institute of Great Britain and Ireland. 72 (1/2): 33–44. doi:10.2307/2844455. JSTOR 2844455.
- Hutchinson, Thomas J. (1868). The Paraná; with Incidents of the Paraguayan War and South American Recollections from 1861 to 1868. London: Edward Stanford.
- Magalhães, Mario Osorio (2017). "Pelotas". In Beatriz Ana Loner; Lorena Almeida Gill; Mario Osorio Magalhães (eds.). Dicionário de História de Pelotas (PDF) (in Portuguese) (3 ed.). Pelotas: Editora da UFPel. ISBN 978-85-517-0016-7.
- Mansilla, Lucio V. (1875). Reglamento para el ejercicio y maniobras de la infantería del Ejército Argentino (in Spanish). Buenos Aires: Imprenta y Librerías de Mayo.
- McGrail, Sean (1985). "Towards a Classification of Water Transport". World Archaeology. 16 (3, Water Craft and Water Transport): 289–303. JSTOR 124536.
- Montalbetti, Gustavo Flores (2016). "El Primer Puente sobre el Río Juramento". Enciclopedia Digital de la Provincia de Salta - Argentina (in Spanish).
- Parish, Sir Woodbine (1852). Buenos Ayres and the provinces of the Rio de la Plata (2 ed.). London: John Murray.
- Parras, Fray Pedro José de (1882). "Diario y derrotero de los viajes". Revista de la Biblioteca Pública de Buenos Aires (in Spanish). Vol. 4. Buenos Aires: Biblioteca Nacional Argentina.
- Paucke, Florian (2010). Hacia allá y para acá (PDF) (in Spanish). Translated by Wernicke, Edmundo. Santa Fe, Argentina: Ministerio de Innovación y Cultura de la Provincia de Santa Fe. ISBN 978-987-26301-0-2.
- Pimenta Bueno, Francisco Antonio (1880). Memoria justificativa dos trabalhos de que foi encarregado à provincia de Matto Grosso (in Portuguese). Rio de Janeiro: Typographia Nacional.
- Real Academia Española (2024). "Diccionario de la lengua española" (in Spanish).
- Saint-Hilaire, Augustin (1824). Histoire des Plantes du Brésil et du Paraguay (in French). Paris: Chez A. Belin.
- Sarmiento, Domingo F. (1868). Life in the Argentine Republic in the Days of the Tyrants: Or, Civilization and Barbarism. Translated by Mann, Mrs Horace. London: Sampson, Low, Son and Marston.
- Serruys, Henry (1981). "'Hun-t'o: tulum'. Floats and Containers in Mongolia and Central Asia". Bulletin of the School of Oriental and African Studies, University of London. 44 (1): 105–119. JSTOR 616298.
- Taunay, Alfredo d'Escragnolle (1868). Scenas de Viagem: Exploraçāo entre os rios Taquary e Aquidauna no districto do Miranda (in Portuguese). Rio de Janeiro: Typographia Americana.
- Udaondo, Enrique (1939). Reseña Histórica de la Villa de Luján (in Spanish). Luján, Argentina: self.
- Valle Cabral, Alfredo do (1877). "Noticia das obras manuscritas e inéditas relativas á viajem philosophica do Dr. Alexandre Rodrigues Ferreira, pelas capitanias do Grâo-Pará, Rio-Negro, Matto Grosso e Cuyabá (1783-1792)". Annaes da Bibliotheca Nacional do Rio de Janeiro (in Portuguese). Vol. III.
