= Germán Torres =

Mexican boxer (born 1957)

Personal information
- Nickname: Ozeki Torres
- Nationality: (Mexico) Mexican
- Born: Germán Torres; May 28, 1957 (age 69) Celaya, Mexico
- Height: 5 ft 5 in (165 cm)
- Weight: Light Flyweight

Boxing career
- Stance: Orthodox

Boxing record
- Total fights: 80
- Wins: 63
- Win by KO: 47
- Losses: 13
- Draws: 4
- No contests: 0

Germán Torres (born May 28, 1957) is a Mexican former world boxing champion. His nickname was Ozeki. Torres was born in Celaya, Guanajuato.

== Pro career ==
Torres turned pro in 1975 at the age of fifteen, and won the vacant WBC light flyweight title in his fifth attempt, with a decision win over Soon-Jung Kang in 1988. He had lost decisions to Hilario Zapata and Jung-Koo Chang (three times). He lost the title in his first defense to Yul-Woo Lee in 1989 by TKO.

== See also ==
- List of light-flyweight boxing champions
- List of Mexican boxing world champions

Achievements
Vacant Title last held by Chang Jung-koo	WBC light flyweight champion December 11, 1988 – March 19, 1989	Succeeded by Lee Yul-woo
