= Bauke =

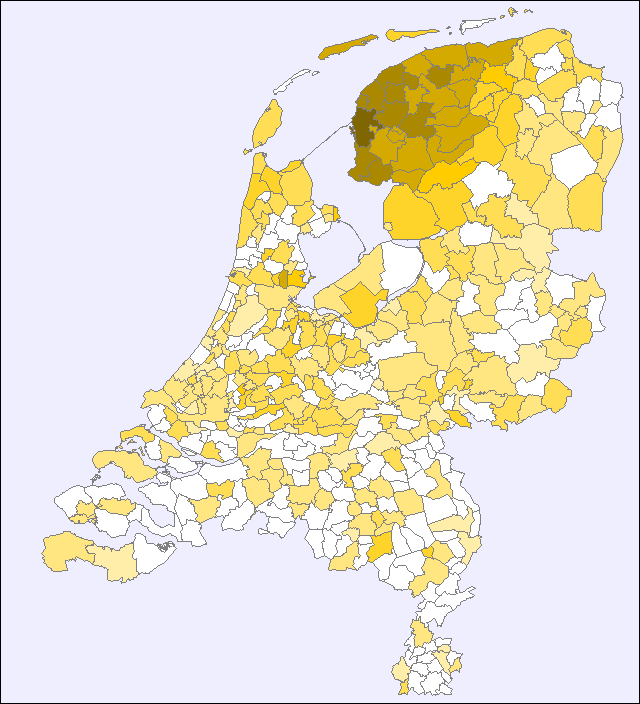
Relative distribution map of the first name “Bauke” registered at birth before 2018 in the Netherlands.

Bauke is a masculine Dutch given name. Notable people with the name include:

- Bauke Muller (born 1962), Dutch bridge player
- Bauke Mollema (born 1986), Dutch cyclist
- Bauke Roolvink (1912–1979), Dutch politician and trade union leader

== See also ==
- Baucke
