= Andreas Kobler =

Catholic historian (1816–1892)

Andreas Kobler (22 June 1816 in Mühldorf am Inn, in Bavaria – 15 November 1892 in Klagenfurt) was a Catholic historian. He made his preliminary studies at Landshut, and studied theology at Munich, where Johann Adam Möhler and Joseph Görres appear to have awakened in the young theologian his preference for the study of history.

== Biography ==
After his ordination in 1840 he was a curate on the mission for four years, after which he entered the novitiate of the Society of Jesus in Graz. Later he was sent to America on account of the disturbances of 1848 in his own country, and was attached to the New York mission for five years, being occupied mostly as professor of mathematics. Returning to Europe, he taught in Pressburg until 1857, where he was sent to Innsbruck as professor of church history.

He held this chair for fourteen years, and was rector of the college of Innsbruck from 1861 to 1866. In 1871 he became once more professor of mathematics at Linz, and for two years rector of the college there. Returning then to Innsbruck, he dedicated nine years to literary work, was appointed superior (1887) of the seminary at Klagenfurt, where he was still vigorous and active in the pulpit when he died at the age of 75.

== Bibliography ==
Kobler's literary works are for the most part on historical subjects. Besides contributions to periodicals, Kobler published:

- Florian Bauke, ein Jesuit in Paraguay ("Florian Baucke, a Jesuit in Paraguay", 1870)
- Die Aufhebung der Gesellschaft Jesu ("The Suppression of the Society of Jesus (1773)", 1873)
- Eine innere Klosterschule im IX. Jahrhundert ("An Internal Monastic School of the Ninth Century", 1876)
- Die Märtyrer und Bekenner der Gesellschaft Jesu in England während der Jahre 1550-1681 ("Jesuit Martyrs and Confessors in England, 1550-1681", 1886)
- De Maistre, fünf Briefe über den öffentlichen Unterricht in Russland (from the French, "Five Letters on Public Education in Russia" by Joseph de Maistre)
- Studien über die Klöster des Mittelalters (from the English, "Studies on Medieval Monasteries", 1867)
- Katholisches Leben im Mittelalter ("Catholic Life in the Middle Ages", from Kenelm Digby's Mores Catholici, 1887-9)
