= Fidel Bassa =

Colombian boxer (born 1962)

Personal information
- Nationality: (Colombia) Colombian
- Born: Fidel Bassa; December 18, 1962 (age 63) El Retén, Colombia
- Height: 5 ft 3 1/2 in (161 cm)
- Weight: Flyweight

Boxing career
- Stance: Orthodox

Boxing record
- Total fights: 24
- Wins: 22
- Win by KO: 15
- Losses: 1
- Draws: 1

Fidel Bassa (born 18 December 1962) is a Colombian former professional boxer. Bassa is owner and manager of Mundo Científico, a provider of educational technology and telecommunications company based in Bogota, Colombia.

He was WBA Flyweight Champion from 13 February 1987 until 30 September 1989. He won the title after defeating Hilario Zapata, and was finally defeated by Jesús Kiki Rojas.

He is remembered for his epic title fights against Dave McAuley in The King's Hall, Belfast in 1987 and 1988.

== See also ==
- List of flyweight boxing champions

Achievements
Preceded by Hilario Zapata	WBA flyweight champion February 13, 1987 – September 30, 1989	Succeeded by Jesús Kiki Rojas
