= Elvis Álvarez =

Colombian boxer (1965–1995)

Personal information
- Nationality: Colombian
- Born: February 2, 1965 Medellín, Antioquia, Colombia
- Died: July 16, 1995 (aged 30) Medellín, Antioquia, Colombia
- Weight: Flyweight; Super flyweight Bantamweight

Boxing career
- Stance: Southpaw

Boxing record
- Total fights: 42
- Wins: 31
- Win by KO: 19
- Losses: 8
- Draws: 3

Elvis Álvarez (February 2, 1965 - July 16, 1995) was a Colombian professional boxer in the flyweight division.

== Boxing career ==
Álvarez turned professional in 1985 and captured the vacant WBO flyweight title with a decision win over Miguel Mercedes in 1989, and quickly vacated his title in March 1990 due to lack of interest in belt. In 1991 he captured the WBA flyweight title with a decision win over Leopard Tamakuma, but lost it in his first defense to Yong-Kang Kim. In 1994, in his only American appearance, he lost a twelve-round decision to Junior Jones for the WBA bantamweight title. It was to be his last fight.

== Murder ==
Álvarez was shot to death on July 16, 1995, in Medellín, Colombia.

Achievements
Preceded by Inaugural Champion	WBO flyweight champion March 3, 1989 – March 1990; Vacated	Vacant Title next held by Isidro Perez
Preceded by Leopard Tamakuma	WBA flyweight champion March 14, 1991 – June 1, 1991	Succeeded by Yong-Kang Kim
