= Lee Yul-woo =

South Korean boxer (1967–2009)

Personal information
- Nickname: Hot Pepper
- Born: Lee Yul-woo; January 25, 1967 Okcheon County, South Korea
- Died: December 10, 2009 (aged 42)
- Height: 5 ft 5 in (165 cm)
- Weight: Light-flyweight; Flyweight

Boxing career
- Stance: Orthodox

Boxing record
- Total fights: 22
- Wins: 19
- Win by KO: 10
- Losses: 3

Yul-Woo Lee (January 25, 1967 – December 10, 2009) was a South Korean former professional boxer who competed from 1985 to 1990. He was a world champion in two weight classes, having held the World Boxing Council (WBC) light-flyweight title in 1989 and the World Boxing Association (WBA) flyweight title in 1990.

== Professional career ==
Lee turned pro in 1985 and captured the WBC light flyweight title with a TKO win over German Torres in 1989. He lost his belt in his first defense to Humberto González. He then moved up in weight and won a split decision over WBA flyweight title holder Jesus Kiki Rojas in 1990, but lost the belt in his first defense again to Leopard Tamakuma by TKO. He retired after the loss.

== Death ==
He passed away from pancreatic cancer in 2009.

== Professional boxing record ==
22 fights	19 wins	3 losses
By knockout	10	1
By decision	9	2

No.	Result	Record	Opponent	Type	Round	Date	Location	Notes
22	Loss	19–3	Leopard Tamakuna	TKO	10 (12), 2:21	Jul 29, 1990	City Gymnasium, Mito, Japan	Lost WBA flyweight title
21	Win	19–2	Jesús Rojas	SD	12	Mar 10, 1990	Chungmu Gymnasium, Daejeon, South Korea	Won WBA flyweight title
20	Win	18–2	Kim Yong-Kang	PTS	10	Nov 25, 1989	Busan, South Korea	
19	Loss	17–2	Humberto González	UD	12	Jun 25, 1989	Cheongju Gymnasium, Cheongju, South Korea	Lost WBC light-flyweight title
18	Win	17–1	Germán Torres	TKO	9 (12), 2:14	Mar 19, 1989	Chung Gymnasium, Daejeon, South Korea	Won WBC light-flyweight title
17	Win	16–1	Roger de Rama	KO	4 (10), 2:24	Jul 24, 1988	World Trade Center, Seoul, South Korea	
16	Win	15–1	Chae Hun-Kook	KO	3 (10), 2:47	Oct 9, 1988	Sheraton Walker Hill Hotel, Seoul, South Korea	
15	Loss	14–1	Miguel Mercedes	UD	10	May 29, 1988	Hongkuk Gymnasium, Yeosu, South Korea	
14	Win	14–0	Kim Dok-Hyun	KO	7 (10), 1:10	Mar 20, 1988	Jongha Gymnasium, Ulsan, South Korea	
13	Win	13–0	Amado Ursua	KO	5 (10), 1:40	Dec 13, 1987	Chungmu Gymnasium, Daejeon, South Korea	
12	Win	12–0	Arnulfo Melencion	KO	4 (10)	Nov 14, 1987	Palpal Gymnasium, Seoul, South Korea	
11	Win	11–0	Julio Gudino	PTS	10	Jun 28, 1987	Sunin Gymnasium, Incheon, South Korea	
10	Win	10–0	Romy Navarrete	KO	7 (10), 1:47	Apr 19, 1987	Sunin Gymnasium, Incheon, South Korea	
9	Win	9–0	Han Sang-Hyun	PTS	10	Jan 18, 1987	Pohang Gymnasium, Pohang, South Korea	
8	Win	8–0	Choi Keun-Soo	PTS	8	Nov 1, 1986	Pohang Gymnasium, Pohang, South Korea	
7	Win	7–0	Kim Sung-Kyu	PTS	8	Aug 30, 1986	Citizen Hall, Ozan, South Korea	
6	Win	6–0	Kim Chan-Yung	KO	2 (6)	Jul 27, 1986	Hongcheon, South Korea	
5	Win	5–0	Kim Jung-Hyun	KO	5 (6), 0:55	Jun 28, 1986	Pohang Indoor Gymnasium, Pohang, South Korea	
4	Win	4–0	Park Jong-Hwa	KO	2 (?)	Dec 10, 1985	Seoul, South Korea	
3	Win	3–0	Lee Sang-Jun	PTS	4	Dec 8, 1985	Seoul, South Korea	
2	Win	2–0	Choi No-Sung	PTS	4	Dec 5, 1985	Munhwa Gymnasium, Seoul, South Korea	
1	Win	1–0	Yang Dong-Pil	PTS	4	Jul 13, 1985	Chungju, South Korea	

== Titles in boxing ==
=== Major world titles ===
- WBC light-flyweight champion (108 lbs)
- WBA flyweight champion (112 lbs)

== See also ==
- List of light-flyweight boxing champions
- List of flyweight boxing champions

Sporting positions
World boxing titles
Preceded by Germán Torres	WBC light-flyweight champion March 19 – June 25, 1989	Succeeded by Humberto González
Preceded by Jesús Rojas	WBA flyweight champion March 10 – July 29, 1990	Succeeded by Leopard Tamakuma
