= Köbler v Republik Österreich =

Köbler v Austria
- Court: European Court of Justice
- Citation: (2003) C-224/01

Keywords
- Preliminary ruling

Köbler v Austria (2003) C-224/01 is an EU law case, concerning the preliminary ruling procedure in the European Union.

== Facts ==
Professors who had completed 15 years service in Austrian universities got more pay, but Professor Köbler had been in non-Austrian universities and claimed this should be considered.

The Verwaltungsgerichtshof (VGH), the highest Austrian administrative court, referred to the European Court of Justice. The ECJ Registrar suggested an earlier ruling covered the same point, and the increment was not compatible with EU law. The VGH withdrew the request, but then decided that the earlier judgment was not applicable to Prof Köbler. He then claimed damages at the Vienna Civil Court, for the VGH infringing EU law. They referred to the ECJ.

== Judgment ==
The Court of Justice held that all state organs, including the judiciary can be liable under Francovich principles. However, in this case, though the VGH was wrong, it was not sufficiently serious to warrant liability, so Prof Köbler lost. However, liability would arise only ‘in the exceptional case where the court has manifestly infringed the applicable law’. A deliberate refusal to follow EU law would result in liability.

== See also ==
- European Union law
