= Florian Baucke =

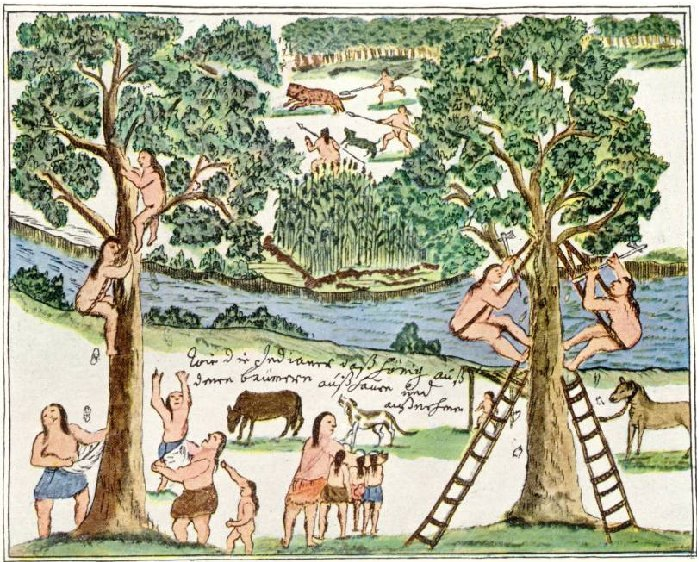
Honey harvest in a Jesuit reduction in South America, 18th Century

Florian Baucke, also Florian Paucke, Florian Pauke, Spanish: Florián Baucke (24 September 1719, Winzig (Polish: Wińsko), Silesia/Bohemian Royal Lands, (1526–1742) Habsburg monarchy (Austria) – 14 July 1779, Neuhaus (Czech: Jindřichův Hradec), Bohemia, Austria) was a Silesian and Bohemian Jesuit missionary, who recorded the native traditions of South America.

Baucke was born in Winzig, Austrian Silesia.

In 1736, he became a member of the Society of Jesus (Jesuite).

He worked mainly in the Río de la Plata, Imperial Spain, and drew and painted the customs of the region.

He returned to Austria and Bohemia in 1768. He died, aged 59, in Neuhaus, Bohemia.

His original manuscripts are in the Library of the Zwettl Abbey, Zwettl, Lower Austria.

== Sources ==
- Andreas Kobler (1816–92): Pater Florian Baucke ein Jesuit in Paraguay. 1870
- Augustin Bringmann: Pater Florian Baucke, ein deutscher Missionär in Paraguay. 1908
- Friedrich Wilhelm Bautz (1975). "Baucke (Pauke), Florian". In Bautz, Friedrich Wilhelm (ed.). Biographisch-Bibliographisches Kirchenlexikon (BBKL) (in German). Vol. 1. Hamm: Bautz. cols. 413–414. ISBN 3-88309-013-1.
- Wilhelm Kratz SJ (1953). "Baucke, Florian". Neue Deutsche Biographie (in German). Vol. 1. Berlin: Duncker & Humblot. pp. 631–632. (full text online).
