= Betulio González =

Venezuelan boxer

Personal information
- Born: Betulio Segundo González; October 24, 1949 (age 76) La Concepción, Venezuela
- Height: 5 ft 2 1/2 in (159 cm)
- Weight: Light flyweight; Flyweight

Boxing career
- Reach: 66 in (168 cm)
- Stance: Orthodox

Boxing record
- Total fights: 92
- Wins: 76
- Win by KO: 52
- Losses: 12
- Draws: 4

Betulio Segundo González (born October 24, 1949) is a former boxer from Venezuela, who is considered a national hero in Venezuela. He is considered by many to be Venezuela's greatest world champion in boxing history. A combatant of 92 bouts, he fought until eleven months before he turned forty, the mandatory age for professional fighters to retire in Venezuela.

== Professional career ==
A native of Maracaibo, Zulia State he made his professional boxing debut on April 24, 1968, knocking out Elio Monzat in the third round at Gonzalez's hometown. Gonzalez won his first ten fights, including his Caracas debut, on November 25 of that same year, with a ten-round decision over Evencio Bruguillos.

On August 1, 1969, his winning streak came to a halt, when he was held to a ten-round draw (tie), by Juan José Brizuela in Caracas. He beat Brizuela by a ten-round decision in a September 16 rematch, then challenged Hector Criollo for the Venezuelan Flyweight title on October 10. He won his first belt by knocking out Criollo in seven rounds to win the regional title.

On March 6, 1970, he suffered a somewhat surprising defeat, at the hands of Felix Marquez, who had only five prior professional fights. He was knocked out by Marquez in six rounds. He followed this with a win over Marquez by 12 rounds split decision to retain the Venezuelan flyweight title in a rematch as well as a win over Nestor Jimenez and a loss to Ignacio Espinal; both Jimenez and Espinal would later go on to fight for world titles.

On April 1, 1971, he got his first world title try, in what also was his first fight abroad. Fighting Masao Ohba in Tokyo for the WBA world Flyweight title, he dropped a fifteen-round unanimous decision.

After three more wins, he had his second chance at a world title: on November 20, he faced world champion Erbito Salavarria for his WBC world title. The fight resulted in a controversial fifteen-round draw: The Zulia State boxing commission alleged that Salavarria had been given sugar or illegal drugs during the fight, and sent the WBC a bottle with which the sugar or drugs had supposedly been administered. The WBC recognized Gonzalez to be as world champion.

He lost the title in his second defense, being handed a tenth-round knockout by Venice Borkhorsor on September 29 at Bangkok. He defeated Socrates Batoto in his lone defense.

Gonzalez had four wins in a row after that loss, and, on August 4, 1973, he became a world Flyweight champion for the second time, when he claimed the vacant WBA title by defeating Miguel Canto by a fifteen-round majority decision in Maracaibo.

On November 17, he retained the title with an eleventh-round knockout over Alberto Morales. On May 19, 1974, he faced Shoji Oguma, another world champion boxer, in a non-title, ten round bout held at Tokyo. Gonzalez prevailed by a ten-round decision. On July 20, Gonzalez fought in Italy against Franco Udella, a world Jr. Flyweight champion, and he retained the WBA world Flyweight title with a tenth-round knockout.

Oguma became the WBA world Flyweight champion when he beat Gonzalez, on November 1, with a fifteen-round split decision in Tokyo.

After one more win, Gonzalez and Canto met, this time with Canto as WBC world champion. Canto defeated Gonzalez by a fifteen-round split decision on May 24, 1975 at Monterrey, Mexico.

Gonzalez then won eight fights in a row, before fighting for the Fecarbox regional Flyweight title. On June 20, 1976, he won that title by knocking out Hildo Roche in two rounds. On November 10, he and Canto had a third match; Canto retained the WBC world Flyweight title with a fifteen-round split decision, in a fight held in Caracas.

Gonzalez won eight more fights in a row before being given another chance at becoming world Flyweight champion. On August 12, 1978, he joined the exclusive group of boxers who have become world champions three times in the same division, by defeating Guty Espadas by a fifteen-round majority decision in Caracas. This fight proved controversial as well, as Gonzalez appeared to be knocked down in the last round, but the fight's referee chose not to count it as a knockdown.

On November 4, he retained the title against the famed but maligned Chilean fighter Martin Vargas, a national hero in his country himself, with a twelfth-round knockout. Then, he and Oguma proceeded to have a third encounter, and, on January 1, 1979, they fought to a fifteen-round draw in Hamamatsu.

Gonzalez returned to Japan in July 1979, where, on July 6, he avenged his previous defeat to Oguma, by retaining the title with a twelfth-round knockout. But in his next defense, against Luis Ibarra, he lost a fifteen-round decision and the world title on November 17.

Gonzalez then embarked on another winning streak, which reached seven victories in a row, including two knockouts over future world champion Peter Mathebula, in ten and six rounds, respectively. This winning streak stopped when he challenged Juan Herrera for the WBA world Flyweight title on December 19, 1981. Trying to become a world Flyweight champion for the fourth time, Gonzalez was knocked out in seven rounds.

Santos Laciar went on to beat Herrera for the WBA world title, and, after Gonzalez got another win, the two boxing legends met, on September 14, 1982, at a Maracaibo hotel. In what turned out to be his last try at becoming world Flyweight champion for the fourth time, Gonzalez lost a split decision to the Argentine boxer.

After losing by a twelve-round decision to Alberto Castro for the Fedelatin Flyweight title on July 7, 1984, Gonzalez announced his retirement for the first time.

In 1988, however, he returned to boxing for one more fight: having lost on November 28 to future world champion Rodolfo Blanco by knockout in eight rounds, he retired, eleven months before mandatory retirement in Venezuela.

He became a household name all over Latin America during his tenures as world champion, especially after the Spanish boxing magazines Ring En Español and Guantes helped popularize him.

== Professional boxing record ==
92 fights	76 wins	12 losses
By knockout	52	4
By decision	24	8
Draws	4	

No.	Result	Record	Opponent	Type	Round, time	Date	Location	Notes
92	Loss	76–12–4	Rodolfo Blanco	TKO	8 (10)	1988-11-28	Maracaibo, Venezuela	
91	Win	76–11–4	Pedro Nieves	TKO	5 (10)	1988-10-17	Maracaibo, Venezuela	
90	Draw	75–11–4	Juan Blanco	PTS	12 (12)	1988-08-29	Maracaibo, Venezuela	For Venezuelan light flyweight title
89	Loss	75–11–3	Alberto Castro	PTS	12 (12)	1984-07-07	Maracaibo, Venezuela	For WBA Fedelatin flyweight title
88	Win	75–10–3	Alberto Alger	TKO	1 (10)	1984-05-25	Caracas, Venezuela	
87	Loss	74–10–3	Santos Laciar	SD	15 (15)	1982-08-14	Hotel del Lago Casino, Maracaibo, Venezuela	For WBA flyweight title
86	Win	74–9–3	Julio Guerrero	PTS	10 (10)	1982-06-05	Maracay, Venezuela	
85	Loss	73–9–3	Juan Herrera	TKO	7 (15)	1981-12-19	Carte Clara Baseball Park, Merida, Mexico	For WBA flyweight title
84	Win	73–8–3	Ramon L Perez	PTS	10 (10)	1981-11-21	Maracay, Venezuela	
83	Win	72–8–3	Peter Mathebula	KO	6 (10)	1981-10-04	Maracay, Venezuela	
82	Win	71–8–3	Peter Mathebula	TKO	10 (10)	1981-06-21	Maracaibo, Venezuela	
81	Win	70–8–3	Carlos Illescas	KO	2 (10)	1981-03-28	Maracaibo, Venezuela	
80	Win	69–8–3	Manuel Rios	TKO	5 (10)	1980-12-06	Maracaibo, Venezuela	
79	Win	68–8–3	Pascual Polanco	TKO	5 (10)	1980-11-14	Maracaibo, Venezuela	
78	Win	67–8–3	Arturo Gonzalez	KO	5 (10)	1980-10-31	Maracaibo, Venezuela	
77	Win	66–8–3	Elias DeLeon	PTS	10 (10)	1980-06-28	Maracaibo, Venezuela	
76	Loss	65–8–3	Luis Ibarra	UD	15 (15)	1979-11-17	Maestranza Cesar Giron, Maracay, Venezuela	Lost WBA flyweight title
75	Win	65–7–3	Shoji Oguma	KO	12 (15)	1979-07-06	Tochigi Prefectural Gym, Utsunomiya, Japan	Retained WBA flyweight title
74	Draw	64–7–3	Shoji Oguma	SD	15 (15)	1979-01-29	City Gymnasium, Hamamatsu, Japan	Retained WBA flyweight title
73	Win	64–7–2	Martín Vargas	TKO	12 (15)	1978-11-04	Maestranza Cesar Giron, Maracay, Venezuela	Retained WBA flyweight title
72	Win	63–7–2	Guty Espadas	MD	15 (15)	1978-08-12	Maestranza Cesar Giron, Maracay, Venezuela	Won WBA flyweight title
71	Win	62–7–2	Rocky Mijares	TKO	7 (10)	1978-07-08	Maracaibo, Venezuela	
70	Win	61–7–2	Pedro Campoverde	TKO	2 (10)	1978-06-17	Valencia, Venezuela	
69	Win	60–7–2	Humberto Mayorga	TKO	2 (10)	1978-05-13	Maracaibo, Venezuela	
68	Win	59–7–2	Raul Valdez	PTS	10 (10)	1978-03-04	Caracas, Venezuela	
67	Win	58–7–2	Carlos Ramon Escalante	TKO	6 (10)	1977-09-30	Maracaibo, Venezuela	
66	Win	57–7–2	Rodolfo Rodríguez	RTD	7 (10)	1977-06-25	Plaza de Toros, Maracaibo, Venezuela	
65	Win	56–7–2	Samuel Machorro	PTS	10 (10)	1977-04-16	Maracaibo, Venezuela	
64	Win	55–7–2	Prudencio Cardona	KO	3 (10)	1977-03-12	Maracaibo, Venezuela	
63	Win	54–7–2	Valentin Martinez	TKO	8 (10)	1977-02-13	Maracaibo, Venezuela	
62	Win	53–7–2	Juanito Herrera	TKO	2 (10)	1976-11-29	Maracaibo, Venezuela	
61	Loss	52–7–2	Miguel Canto	SD	15 (15)	1976-10-03	Nuevo Circo, Caracas, Venezuela	For WBC & The Ring flyweight titles
60	Win	52–6–2	Mario Chavez	KO	2 (10)	1976-08-21	Caracas, Venezuela	
59	Win	51–6–2	Robert Emerson	TKO	3 (10)	1976-07-25	Maracaibo, Venezuela	
58	Win	50–6–2	Hilde Roche	KO	2 (12)	1976-06-20	Caracas, Venezuela	Won vacant WBC FECARBOX flyweight title
57	Win	49–6–2	Felix Madrigal	TKO	2 (10)	1976-05-15	Maracaibo, Venezuela	
56	Win	48–6–2	Henry Diaz	TKO	8 (10)	1976-04-10	Caracas, Venezuela	
55	Win	47–6–2	Tony Sanchez	PTS	10 (10)	1976-02-14	Nuevo Circo, Caracas, Venezuela	
54	Win	46–6–2	Luis Torres	KO	3 (10)	1975-12-01	Caracas, Venezuela	
53	Win	45–6–2	Andres Reyes	KO	4 (10)	1975-11-15	Caracas, Venezuela	
52	Win	44–6–2	Reynaldo Romero	KO	1 (10)	1975-10-04	Caracas, Venezuela	
51	Win	43–6–2	Sergio Omar Villouta	TKO	2 (10)	1975-09-06	Caracas, Venezuela	
50	Win	42–6–2	Mariano García	TKO	2 (10)	1975-07-26	Caracas, Venezuela	
49	Loss	41–6–2	Miguel Canto	SD	15 (15)	1975-05-24	Plaza de Toros Monumental, Monterrey, Mexico	For WBC & The Ring flyweight titles
48	Win	41–5–2	Mario Mendez	KO	8 (10)	1975-02-22	Caracas, Venezuela	
47	Loss	40–5–2	Shoji Oguma	SD	15 (15)	1974-10-01	Nihon University Auditorium, Tokyo, Japan	Lost WBC flyweight title
46	Win	40–4–2	Franco Udella	TKO	10 (15)	1974-07-20	Stadio Darsena, Lignano Sabbiadoro, Italy	Retained WBC flyweight title
45	Win	39–4–2	Shoji Oguma	PTS	10 (10)	1974-05-19	City Sogo Gym, Kōriyama, Japan	
44	Win	38–4–2	Luis Cortez	TKO	2 (10)	1974-03-30	Caracas, Venezuela	
43	Win	37–4–2	Alberto Morales	TKO	11 (15)	1973-11-17	Nuevo Circo, Caracas, Venezuela	Retained WBC flyweight title
42	Win	36–4–2	Reinaldo Ramirez	KO	3 (10)	1973-09-29	Nuevo Circo, Caracas, Venezuela	
41	Win	35–4–2	Miguel Canto	MD	15 (15)	1973-08-04	Luis Aparicio Stadium, Maracaibo, Venezuela	Won vacant WBC flyweight title
40	Win	34–4–2	Ricardo Delgado	PTS	10 (10)	1973-07-10	Maracay, Venezuela	
39	Win	33–4–2	Lorenzo Gutierrez	KO	1 (10)	1973-03-10	Maracaibo, Venezuela	
38	Win	32–4–2	Osamu Haba	TKO	5 (10)	1973-01-31	Caracas, Venezuela	
37	Win	31–4–2	Rudy Billones	TKO	1 (10)	1972-11-17	Maracaibo, Venezuela	
36	Loss	30–4–2	Venice Borkhorsor	TKO	10 (15)	1972-09-29	Kittikachorn Stadium, Bangkok, Thailand	Lost WBC flyweight title
35	Win	30–3–2	Socrates Batoto	KO	4 (15)	1972-06-03	Nuevo Circo, Caracas, Venezuela	Retained WBC flyweight title
34	Win	29–3–2	Willie Pastrana	TKO	4 (10)	1972-03-15	Maracaibo, Venezuela	
33	Win	28–3–2	Salvador Lozano	TKO	6 (10)	1972-01-31	Nuevo Circo, Caracas, Venezuela	
32	Draw	27–3–2	Erbito Salavarria	SD	15 (15)	1971-11-20	Luis Aparicio Stadium, Maracaibo, Venezuela	For WBC flyweight title
31	Win	27–3–1	San Sacristan	PTS	10 (10)	1971-08-30	Caracas, Venezuela	
30	Win	26–3–1	Natalio Jimenez	PTS	10 (10)	1971-07-17	Maracaibo, Venezuela	
29	Win	25–3–1	Tony Moreno	UD	10 (10)	1971-06-05	Nuevo Circo, Caracas, Venezuela	
28	Loss	24–3–1	Masao Ohba	UD	15 (15)	1971-04-01	Nihon University Auditorium, Tokyo, Japan	For WBA flyweight title
27	Win	24–2–1	Lucio Del Rio Mosca	TKO	8 (10)	1971-01-31	Caracas, Venezuela	
26	Win	23–2–1	Bernabe Villacampo	SD	12 (12)	1970-12-21	Nuevo Circo, Caracas, Venezuela	
25	Win	22–2–1	Rodolfo Lopez	TKO	7 (10)	1970-11-30	Caracas, Venezuela	
24	Win	21–2–1	Jose Cruz Garcia	TKO	6 (10)	1970-11-02	Caracas, Venezuela	
23	Win	20–2–1	Ubaldo Duarte	PTS	10 (10)	1970-09-25	Caracas, Venezuela	
22	Win	19–2–1	Ignacio Espinal	TKO	10 (10)	1970-08-04	Caracas, Venezuela	
21	Win	18–2–1	Félix Márquez	SD	12 (12)	1970-06-05	Nuevo Circo, Caracas, Venezuela	Retained Venezuelan flyweight title
20	Loss	17–2–1	Ignacio Espinal	PTS	10 (10)	1970-05-08	Caracas, Venezuela	
19	Win	17–1–1	Nestor Jimenez	PTS	10 (10)	1970-04-17	Caracas, Venezuela	
18	Loss	16–1–1	Félix Márquez	TKO	6 (10)	1970-03-06	Nuevo Circo, Caracas, Venezuela	
17	Win	16–0–1	Plinio Hernandez	TKO	3 (10)	1970-02-20	Caracas, Venezuela	
16	Win	15–0–1	Catalino Alvarado	TKO	6 (10)	1969-12-12	Caracas, Venezuela	
15	Win	14–0–1	Ismael Escobar	KO	2 (?)	1969-11-03	Caracas, Venezuela	
14	Win	13–0–1	Hector Criollo	TKO	7 (12)	1969-10-10	Caracas, Venezuela	Won Venezuelan flyweight title
13	Win	12–0–1	Juan Jose Brizuela	PTS	10 (10)	1969-09-16	Estadio Alejandro Borges, Maracaibo, Venezuela	
12	Win	11–0–1	Ramon Bravo	KO	5 (10)	1969-09-08	Caracas, Venezuela	
11	Draw	10–0–1	Juan Jose Brizuela	PTS	10 (10)	1969-08-01	Caracas, Venezuela	
10	Win	10–0	Nelson Alarcon	PTS	10 (10)	1969-07-15	Maracaibo, Venezuela	
9	Win	9–0	Antonio Barbosa	PTS	10 (10)	1969-05-26	Maracaibo, Venezuela	
8	Win	8–0	Mario De Leon	PTS	10 (10)	1969-03-31	Maracaibo, Venezuela	
7	Win	7–0	Hilario Diaz	PTS	10 (10)	1969-02-03	Caracas, Venezuela	
6	Win	6–0	Evencio Bruguillos	PTS	10 (10)	1968-11-25	Nuevo Circo, Caracas, Venezuela	
5	Win	5–0	Hector Criollo	TKO	5 (10)	1968-10-22	Maracaibo, Venezuela	
4	Win	4–0	Pollo Lara	KO	4 (?)	1968-09-17	Maracaibo, Venezuela	
3	Win	3–0	Fernando Ramirez	TKO	3 (?)	1968-08-09	Cabimas, Venezuela	
2	Win	2–0	Jose L Hernandez	PTS	4 (4)	1968-06-26	Maracaibo, Venezuela	
1	Win	1–0	Eliseo Monzant	TKO	3 (?)	1968-04-24	Estadio Alejandro Borges, Maracaibo, Venezuela	

== See also ==
- List of world flyweight boxing champions

Sporting positions
Regional boxing titles
Preceded by Hector Criollo	Venezuelan flyweight champion October 10, 1969 – 1970; Vacated	Vacant Title next held by Luis Reyes Arnal
Vacant Title last held by Orlando Hernández	WBC FECARBOX flyweight champion June 20, 1976 – 1976; Vacated	Vacant Title next held by Orlando Maldonado
World boxing titles
Preceded by Erbito Salavarria; Stripped	WBC flyweight champion December 29, 1971 – September 29, 1972; Awarded title	Succeeded by Venice Borkhorsor
Vacant Title last held by Venice Borkhorsor	WBC flyweight champion August 4, 1973 – October 1, 1974	Succeeded by Shoji Oguma
Preceded by Guty Espadas	WBA flyweight champion August 12, 1978 – November 17, 1979	Succeeded by Luis Ibarra
