= Miguel Canto =

Mexican boxer (1948–2026)

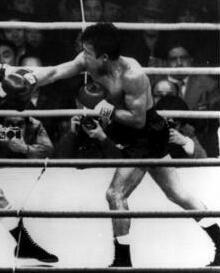
- Canto in 1975

Personal information
- Nickname: El Maestro
- Born: Miguel Angel Canto Solis; January 30, 1948 Mérida, Yucatán, Mexico
- Died: April 16, 2026 (aged 78)
- Height: 5 ft 0 1/2 in (154 cm)
- Weight: Flyweight

Boxing career
- Reach: 63 in (160 cm)
- Stance: Orthodox

Boxing record
- Total fights: 74
- Wins: 61
- Win by KO: 15
- Losses: 9
- Draws: 4

Miguel Angel Canto Solis (January 30, 1948 – April 16, 2026) was a Mexican world boxing champion who held the WBC and Lineal flyweight titles.

== Boxing life ==
Unlike many Mexican boxers, Canto was not a "slam-bang" type of boxer ("Slam-Bang" boxers are boxers whose fights are usually action-packed; Mexican boxers are usually stereotyped as "slam-bangers"). He used boxing techniques and knowledge instead of trying to score knockouts in most of his fights. Proof of this is that he only won fifteen fights by knockout, out of more than seventy professional bouts. He was a defensive expert, somewhat in the style of Willie Pep.

Canto began his professional boxing career on February 5, 1969. He became one of those rare cases in boxing, like Alexis Argüello, Henry Armstrong, Bernard Hopkins, Victor Luvi Callejas and Wilfredo Vazquez, where a boxer loses his first fight and goes on to become a world champion. He lost that day to Raul Hernandez, in Canto's hometown of Mérida, by a knockout in round three.

== First win ==
His first win came against Pedro Martinez, on May 5, 1969, by a four round decision, also at Mérida. Canto lost his next fight, but a streak of seven undefeated fights (he went 5-0-2, with 2 knockouts during that streak), led him to fight Vicente Pool on May 27, 1970, for the Yucatán state Flyweight title. Canto won his first professional belt when he outpointed Pool over twelve rounds. In his first defense, he retained the crown, with a twelve round decision over Jose Luis Cetina. After losing his next bout, a ten round, non title bout against Tarcisio Gomez, on a decision, he went on to win 21 bouts in a row, including his first bout outside Mérida (a two round knockout of Pedro Martinez in Cansahcab, Mexico), and a win over Constantino Garcia on January 22, 1972, by twelve round decision, to claim the Mexican Flyweight title. On January 31, 1973, he fought to a ten round draw (tie) against perennial contender Ignacio Espinal.

After winning his next four fights, including a rematch victory over Tarcisio Gomez, he was given his first world title try, when he fought Betulio González in Maracaibo, Venezuela, for the WBA world Flyweight title. In what was also his first fight abroad, he was outpointed by the equally legendary Gonzalez, considered by many to be Venezuela's greatest fighter of all time, on August 4, 1973.

== WBC World Flyweight Champion Reign ==
Canto won six more fights, including two Mexican title defenses, and on January 8, 1975, he faced WBC world Flyweight champion Shoji Oguma in Sendai. Canto defeated Oguma by a fifteen round decision to claim the WBC and vacant lineal flyweight titles. His dream of becoming a world champion finally realized, Canto was a busy champion, mixing several non-title bouts with his title defenses. In his next fight, he beat Espinal in a rematch by a ten round decision. In his first title defense, he avenged his loss to Betulio Gonzalez by a fifteen round decision. On August 23 of that year, he defeated OPBF champion Jiro Takada by 11th round TKO. Following that win, Canto faced Espinal for a third time and retained his title once again by a fifteen round decision. On May 15, 1976, he scored a win over former champion Susumu Hanagata. Canto eventually became a traveling world champion.

For his fifth title defense, he returned to Venezuela and defeated Gonzalez for the second time in their trilogy by a fifteen round decision. One month later, he retained the crown against Orlando Javierto, once again by fifteen round decision, in Los Angeles, California.

On April 24, 1977, he returned to Venezuela for a third time, retaining the title against Reyes Arnal by a fifteen round decision in Caracas. Two months later, he beat Kimio Furesawa by a fifteen round decision in Tokyo. Then, he and Martin Vargas fought the first of their two bouts: on September 17, 1977, Canto outpointed Vargas in his hometown of Mérida.

It was Canto's turn to travel to Vargas' hometown of Santiago, Chile, for their rematch, held on November 30 of the same year. Canto once again retained the titles with a fifteen round decision.

In 1978, Canto retained his title three times, including two rematches with Shoji Oguma, both of them held in Japan, and another fifteen round points win over Facomrom Vibonchai, in a fight held at Houston, Texas.

By this time, Canto's name had become a household name all over Latin America, thanks in part to Ring En Español, which gave Canto's fights much coverage.

On February 10, 1979, he retained his titles for a division record fourteenth time against a future world champion, Antonio Avelar, by a fifteen round decision.

On March 18, his reign came to an end, when he lost a fifteen round decision to Chan Hee Park in South Korea. On September 9 of that same year, he tried to recover his titles from Park in a rematch, but, after fifteen rounds, the fight ended in a draw.

Canto's career took a downward spiral after that fight. He won his following three fights, including wins against Olympic Bronze medalist Orlando Maldonado of Puerto Rico and former champion Sung-Jun Kim. In his 70th career fight, he lost to future world champion Gabriel Bernal. Canto avenged his loss to Bernal in his next fight, but lost the remaining three fights of his career by knockout.

After his final loss to Rodolfo Ortega, on July 24, 1982, Canto retired from boxing. He had a record of 61 wins, 9 losses and 4 draws, with 15 knockout wins.

== Death ==
Canto died on April 16, 2026, at the age of 78.

== Professional boxing record ==
74 fights	61 wins	9 losses
By knockout	15	5
By decision	45	4
By disqualification	1	0
Draws	4	

No.	Result	Record	Opponent	Type	Round, time	Date	Location	Notes
74	Loss	61–9–4	Rodolfo Ortega	TKO	9 (10)	1982-07-24	Parque Carta Clara, Mérida, Yucatán, Mexico	
73	Loss	61–8–4	Alfredo Hernandez	TKO	7 (10)	1981-10-31	Auditorio Municipal, Torreón, Coahuila, Mexico	
72	Loss	61–7–4	Candido Tellez	KO	4 (10)	1981-08-29	Villahermosa, Tabasco, Mexico	
71	Win	61–6–4	Gabriel Bernal	UD	10	1981-06-06	Mérida, Yucatán, Mexico	
70	Loss	60–6–4	Gabriel Bernal	UD	10	1981-03-29	Villahermosa, Tabasco, Mexico	
69	Win	60–5–4	Kim Sung-jun	UD	10	1981-02-22	Mérida, Yucatán, Mexico	
68	Win	59–5–4	Orlando Maldonado	DQ	6 (10)	1980-10-18	Plaza Nuevo Progreso, Guadalajara, Jalisco, Mexico	
67	Win	58–5–4	Alfredo Hernandez	UD	10	1980-08-16	Mérida, Yucatán, Mexico	
66	Draw	57–5–4	Park Chan-hee	MD	15	1979-09-09	Jamsil Gymnasium, Seoul, South Korea	For WBC and The Ring flyweight titles
65	Loss	57–5–3	Park Chan-hee	UD	15	1979-03-18	Gudeok Gymnasium, Busan, South Korea	Lost WBC and The Ring flyweight titles
64	Win	57–4–3	Antonio Avelar	UD	15	1979-02-10	Parque Carta Clara, Mérida, Yucatán, Mexico	Retained WBC and The Ring flyweight titles
63	Win	56–4–3	Facomron Vibonchai	SD	15	1978-11-20	Sam Houston Coliseum, Houston, Texas, U.S.	Retained WBC and The Ring flyweight titles
62	Win	55–4–3	Shoji Oguma	UD	15	1978-04-18	Kokugikan, Tokyo, Japan	Retained WBC and The Ring flyweight titles
61	Win	54–4–3	Shoji Oguma	SD	15	1978-01-04	City Sogo Gym, Koriyama, Japan	Retained WBC and The Ring flyweight titles
60	Win	53–4–3	Martín Vargas	UD	15	1977-11-30	Estadio Nacional, Santiago de Chile, Chile	Retained WBC and The Ring flyweight titles
59	Win	52–4–3	Martín Vargas	UD	15	1977-09-17	Parque Carta Clara, Mérida, Yucatán, Mexico	Retained WBC and The Ring flyweight titles
58	Win	51–4–3	Kimio Furesawa	UD	15	1977-06-15	Shinagawa Sports Land, Tokyo, Japan	Retained WBC and The Ring flyweight titles
57	Win	50–4–3	Luis Reyes Arnal	SD	15	1977-04-24	Nuevo Circo, Caracas, Venezuela	Retained WBC and The Ring flyweight titles
56	Win	49–4–3	Orlando Javierto	UD	15	1976-11-19	Sports Arena, Los Angeles, California, U.S.	Retained WBC and The Ring flyweight titles
55	Win	48–4–3	Betulio González	SD	15	1976-10-03	Nuevo Circo, Caracas, Venezuela	Retained WBC, and The Ring flyweight titles
54	Win	47–4–3	Susumu Hanagata	UD	15	1976-05-15	Parque Carta Clara, Mérida, Yucatán, Mexico	Retained WBC and The Ring flyweight titles
53	Win	46–4–3	Francisco Marquez	UD	10	1976-03-13	Arena México, Mexico City, Mexico	
52	Win	45–4–3	Ignacio Espinal	UD	15	1975-12-13	Parque Carta Clara, Mérida, Yucatán, Mexico	Retained WBC and The Ring flyweight titles
51	Win	44–4–3	Jiro Takada	TKO	11 (15)	1975-08-23	Parque Carta Clara, Mérida, Yucatán, Mexico	Retained WBC and The Ring flyweight titles
50	Win	43–4–3	Lupe Madera	TKO	9 (10)	1975-07-18	Cozumel, Quintana Roo, Mexico	
49	Win	42–4–3	Betulio González	SD	15	1975-05-24	Plaza de Toros Monumental, Monterrey, Nuevo León, Mexico	Retained WBC and The Ring flyweight titles
48	Win	41–4–3	Ignacio Espinal	SD	10	1975-03-08	Parque Carta Clara, Mérida, Yucatán, Mexico	
47	Win	40–4–3	Shoji Oguma	MD	15	1975-01-08	Miyagi Sports Center, Sendai, Japan	Won WBC and vacant The Ring flyweight titles
46	Win	39–4–3	Ricardo Delgado	UD	10	1974-10-25	Valladolid, Yucatán, Mexico	
45	Win	38–4–3	Alberto Morales	UD	10	1974-08-17	Arena México, Mexico City, Mexico	
44	Win	37–4–3	Pablito Jimenez	SD	10	1974-06-08	Mérida, Yucatán, Mexico	
43	Win	36–4–3	Manuel Montiel	UD	12	1974-04-27	Plaza de Toros, Mérida, Yucatán, Mexico	Retained Mexico flyweight title
42	Win	35–4–3	Tony Moreno	TKO	5 (10)	1974-02-13	Mérida, Yucatán, Mexico	
41	Win	34–4–3	Lupe Hernandez	UD	12	1973-11-17	Mérida, Yucatán, Mexico	Retained Mexico flyweight title
40	Loss	33–4–3	Betulio González	MD	15	1973-08-04	Estadio Luis Aparicio, Maracaibo, Venezuela	For vacant WBC flyweight title
39	Win	33–3–3	Chamaco Rodriguez	KO	5 (10)	1973-06-29	Chetumal, Quintana Roo, Mexico	
38	Win	32–3–3	Luis Enrique Garcia	TKO	7 (10)	1973-05-10	Villahermosa, Tabasco, Mexico	
37	Win	31–3–3	Rudy Billones	UD	10	1973-05-02	Mérida, Yucatán, Mexico	
36	Win	30–3–3	Tarcisio Gomez	KO	2 (12)	1973-03-24	Mérida, Yucatán, Mexico	Retained Mexico flyweight title
35	Draw	29–3–3	Ignacio Espinal	MD	10	1973-01-31	Mérida, Yucatán, Mexico	
34	Win	29–3–2	Alberto Morales	UD	12	1972-11-18	Plaza de Toros, Mérida, Yucatán, Mexico	Retained Mexico flyweight title
33	Win	28–3–2	Jose Antonio Corral	TKO	3 (10)	1972-09-27	Mérida, Yucatán, Mexico	
32	Win	27–3–2	Jose Luis Valencia	UD	10	1972-07-26	Mérida, Yucatán, Mexico	
31	Win	26–3–2	Ricardo Delgado	UD	12	1972-05-20	Mérida, Yucatán, Mexico	Retained Mexico flyweight title
30	Win	25–3–2	Armando Villa	TKO	4 (10)	1972-04-05	Mérida, Yucatán, Mexico	
29	Win	24–3–2	Jose Vargas	UD	10	1972-03-15	Mérida, Yucatán, Mexico	
28	Win	23–3–2	Rocky Garcia	UD	12	1972-01-22	Plaza de Toros, Mérida, Yucatán, Mexico	Won Mexico flyweight title
27	Win	22–3–2	Luis Carlos Urrunaga	UD	10	1971-12-01	Mérida, Yucatán, Mexico	
26	Win	21–3–2	Alberto Morales	UD	10	1971-10-20	Mérida, Yucatán, Mexico	
25	Win	20–3–2	Roberto Alvarez	UD	10	1971-09-01	Mérida, Yucatán, Mexico	
24	Win	19–3–2	Domingo Ledezma	UD	10	1971-07-28	Mérida, Yucatán, Mexico	
23	Win	18–3–2	Pedro Lopez	KO	3 (8)	1971-07-14	Mérida, Yucatán, Mexico	
22	Win	17–3–2	Mario Garcia	KO	10 (10)	1971-06-02	Mérida, Yucatán, Mexico	
21	Win	16–3–2	Gavilan Martinez	UD	10	1971-05-14	Tekax, Yucatán, Mexico	
20	Win	15–3–2	Jose Luis Cetina	UD	10	1971-04-29	Mérida, Yucatán, Mexico	
19	Win	14–3–2	Tigre Bracamonte	UD	8	1971-04-04	Tizimin, Yucatán, Mexico	
18	Win	13–3–2	Marcus Gomez	TKO	6 (6)	1971-03-17	Mérida, Yucatán, Mexico	
17	Win	12–3–2	Francisco Montalvo	KO	6 (8)	1971-02-14	Cansahcab, Yucatán, Mexico	
16	Win	11–3–2	Pedro Martinez	KO	2 (10)	1971-01-21	Cansahcab, Yucatán, Mexico	
15	Win	10–3–2	Jose Medrano	UD	10	1970-12-09	Mérida, Yucatán, Mexico	
14	Win	9–3–2	Arturo Velazquez	UD	10	1970-11-11	Mérida, Yucatán, Mexico	
13	Loss	8–3–2	Tarcisio Gomez	MD	10	1970-10-14	Mérida, Yucatán, Mexico	
12	Win	8–2–2	Jose Luis Cetina	UD	12	1970-06-24	Mérida, Yucatán, Mexico	
11	Win	7–2–2	Vicente Pool	UD	12	1970-05-27	Mérida, Yucatán, Mexico	
10	Draw	6–2–2	Juan Torres	MD	10	1970-04-29	Mérida, Yucatán, Mexico	
9	Win	6–2–1	Alex Basilio	KO	8 (10)	1970-04-08	Mérida, Yucatán, Mexico	
8	Win	5–2–1	Baby Albornoz	TKO	9 (10)	1970-03-21	Chetumal, Quintana Roo, Mexico	
7	Win	4–2–1	Vicente Pool	UD	10	1970-03-04	Mérida, Yucatán, Mexico	
6	Draw	3–2–1	Joe Calvario	MD	10	1970-02-04	Mérida, Yucatán, Mexico	
5	Win	3–2	Rudy Granados	UD	10	1970-01-21	Mérida, Yucatán, Mexico	
4	Win	2–2	Vicente Pool	UD	8	1969-12-06	Chetumal, Quintana Roo, Mexico	
3	Loss	1–2	Pedro Carillo	TKO	4 (6)	1969-08-13	Arena Coliseo, Mexico City, Mexico	
2	Win	1–1	Pedro Martinez	UD	4	1969-05-05	Mérida, Yucatán, Mexico	
1	Loss	0–1	Raul Hernandez	TKO	3 (4)	1969-02-05	Mérida, Yucatán	

== Honours ==
- He is a member of the International Boxing Hall of Fame.
- Canto was voted as the #1 flyweight (along with Pancho Villa) of the 20th century by the Associated Press in 1999.

== See also ==
- Lineal championship
- List of Mexican boxing world champions
- List of world flyweight boxing champions

Sporting positions
Regional boxing titles
Preceded by Rocky Garcia	Mexican flyweight champion January 22, 1972 – 1975; Vacated	Vacant Title next held by Alberto Morales
World boxing titles
Preceded by Shoji Oguma	WBC flyweight champion January 8, 1975 – March 18, 1979	Succeeded by Park Chan-hee
Vacant Title last held by Venice Borkhorsor	The Ring flyweight champion January 8, 1975 – March 18, 1979	Succeeded by Park Chan-hee
