= Antonio Avelar =

Mexican boxer (1958-2025)

Personal information
- Nickname: El Avelar
- Born: Jose Antonio Rodríguez Avelar; August 28, 1958 (age 68) Guadalajara, Jalisco, Mexico
- Height: 5 ft 7 in (173 cm)
- Weight: Lightweight; Featherweight; Bantamweight; Flyweight

Boxing career
- Reach: 72 in (183 cm)
- Stance: Orthodox

Boxing record
- Wins: 39
- Win by KO: 32
- Losses: 13
- Draws: 1

Jose Antonio Rodríguez Avelar (August 25, 1958 – April 27, 2025) was a Mexican professional boxer in the flyweight division. He was a former WBC and Lineal flyweight Champion.

== Professional career ==
In August 1980, Avelar won his first NABF Championship by knocking out Alberto Morales.

=== WBC Flyweight Championship ===
In his second attempt, Avelar won the WBC and Lineal Flyweight titles by upsetting Shoji Oguma of Japan by T.K.O. in the seventh round. On July 25, 1987, Avelar lost his last bout to an undefeated Miguel Lora for the Colombian's WBC Bantamweight Championship.

== Professional boxing record ==
53 fights	39 wins	13 losses
By knockout	32	9
By decision	5	4
By disqualification	2	0
Draws	1	

No.	Result	Record	Opponent	Type	Round, time	Date	Age	Location	Notes
53	Loss	39–13–1	Miguel Lora	KO	4 (12), 2:09	Jul 25, 1987	28 years, 331 days	Miami Marine Stadium, Key Biscayne, Florida, US	For WBC bantamweight title
52	Win	39–12–1	Wilfredo Vázquez	TKO	8 (10), 1:10	May 30, 1986	27 years, 275 days	Tamiami Fairgrounds Auditorium, Miami, Florida, US	
51	Loss	38–12–1	Arturo Mujica	TKO	4 (?)	Mar 19, 1986	27 years, 203 days	Guadalajara, Mexico	
50	Win	38–11–1	Ali Solis	KO	2 (?)	Feb 4, 1986	27 years, 160 days	La Paz, Mexico	
49	Win	37–11–1	Freddy Castillo	TKO	4 (10)	Sep 23, 1985	27 years, 26 days	Plaza de Toros El Toreo, Tijuana, Mexico	
48	Win	36–11–1	Juan Carlos Solis	KO	4 (?)	Aug 29, 1985	27 years, 1 day	Tepic, Mexico	
47	Win	35–11–1	Jose Gallegos	KO	3 (?)	Jul 22, 1985	26 years, 328 days	Tijuana, Mexico	
46	Win	34–11–1	Mario Nava	TKO	3 (?)	Jun 11, 1985	26 years, 287 days	Tijuana, Mexico	
45	Loss	33–11–1	Gilberto Román	TKO	7 (10)	Mar 30, 1985	26 years, 214 days	Auditorio del Estado, Mexicali, Mexico	
44	Win	33–10–1	Gilberto Román	DQ	5 (10)	Jan 1, 1985	26 years, 126 days	Auditorio del Estado, Mexicali, Mexico	Roman DQ'd for headbutting
43	Win	32–10–1	Diego Avila	TKO	3 (?)	Jul 14, 1984	25 years, 321 days	Tijuana, Mexico	
42	Win	31–10–1	Carlos de la Paz	TKO	4 (?)	May 14, 1984	25 years, 260 days	Tijuana, Mexico	
41	Loss	30–10–1	Fred Jackson	KO	5 (10)	May 1, 1983	24 years, 246 days	Coliseo Roberto Clemente, San Juan, Puerto Rico	
40	Win	30–9–1	Elid Fernandez	DQ	6 (?)	Dec 26, 1982	24 years, 120 days	Tuxtla Gutierrez, Mexico	
39	Loss	29–9–1	Prudencio Cardona	KO	1 (15), 2:04	Mar 20, 1982	23 years, 204 days	Estadio Tamaulipas Futbol, Tampico, Mexico	Lost WBC and The Ring flyweight titles
38	Win	29–8–1	Kim Tae-shik	KO	2 (15), 0:56	Aug 30, 1981	23 years, 2 days	Jangchung Gymnasium, Seoul, South Korea	Retained WBC and The Ring flyweight titles
37	Win	28–8–1	Shoji Oguma	KO	7 (15), 0:56	May 12, 1981	22 years, 257 days	City Gymnasium, Mito, Japan	Won WBC and The Ring flyweight titles
36	Win	27–8–1	Rocky Mijares	KO	2 (10)	Oct 18, 1980	22 years, 51 days	Plaza de Toros Nuevo Progreso, Guadalajara, Mexico	
35	Win	26–8–1	Alberto Morales	TKO	10 (12)	Aug 16, 1980	21 years, 354 days	Merida, Mexico	Won NABF flyweight title
34	Win	25–8–1	Rocky Mijares	KO	1 (10)	Jun 17, 1980	21 years, 294 days	Auditorio Municipal, Torreon, Mexico	
33	Win	24–8–1	Aniceto Vargas	KO	5 (10)	Apr 1, 1980	21 years, 217 days	Sam Houston Coliseum, Houston, Texas, US	
32	Win	23–8–1	Alfonso López	TKO	5 (10), 2:00	Feb 16, 1980	21 years, 172 days	Arena Coliseo, Mexico City, Mexico	
31	Win	22–8–1	Alfredo Hernandez	KO	2 (?)	Jan 1, 1980	21 years, 126 days	Gomez Palacio, Mexico	
30	Win	21–8–1	Adelaido Galindo	TKO	3 (10)	Dec 1, 1979	21 years, 95 days	Arena Coliseo, Mexico City, Mexico	
29	Win	20–8–1	Samuel Machorro	PTS	10	Aug 25, 1979	20 years, 362 days	Mexico City, Mexico	
28	Loss	19–8–1	Miguel Canto	UD	15	Feb 10, 1979	20 years, 166 days	Parque Carta Clara, Merida, Mexico	For WBC flyweight title
27	Loss	19–7–1	Freddy Castillo	TKO	10 (10)	Oct 21, 1978	20 years, 54 days	Merida, Mexico	
26	Win	19–6–1	Matias Marin	KO	8 (?)	Jul 29, 1978	19 years, 237 days	Merida, Mexico	
25	Win	18–6–1	Freddy Hernandez	TKO	8 (?)	Apr 22, 1978	19 years, 237 days	Auditorio Miguel Barragan, San Luis Potosi, Mexico	
24	Loss	17–6–1	Samuel Machorro	PTS	10	Jan 7, 1977	19 years, 132 days	Mexico City, Mexico	
23	Win	17–5–1	Jose Sosa	PTS	10	Oct 12, 1977	19 years, 45 days	Mexico City, Mexico	
22	Win	16–5–1	Arturo Urruzquieta	TKO	10 (10)	Sep 10, 1977	19 years, 13 days	Mexico City, Mexico	
21	Win	15–5–1	Arturo Urruzquieta	KO	2 (?)	Aug 24, 1977	18 years, 361 days	Mexico City, Mexico	
20	Win	14–5–1	Refugio Rojas	KO	5 (10)	Jun 24, 1977	18 years, 300 days	Arena Coliseo, Guadalajara, Mexico	
19	Loss	13–5–1	Gabriel Bernal	PTS	10	May 21, 1977	18 years, 266 days	Arena Coliseo, Mexico City, Mexico	
18	Draw	13–4–1	Antonio Escobar	PTS	10	Apr 2, 1977	18 years, 217 days	La Paz, Mexico	
17	Win	13–4	Pedro Camacho	TKO	6 (10)	Mar 4, 1977	18 years, 188 days	Arena Coliseo, Guadalajara, Mexico	
16	Loss	12–4	Freddy Castillo	PTS	10	Feb 4, 1977	18 years, 160 days	Arena Coliseo, Guadalajara, Mexico	
15	Win	12–3	Juan Carlos Barbosa	KO	4 (10)	Dec 17, 1976	18 years, 111 days	Arena Coliseo, Guadalajara, Mexico	
14	Loss	11–3	Juan Jose Guzman	TKO	7 (10)	Nov 12, 1976	18 years, 76 days	Arena Coliseo, Guadalajara, Mexico	
13	Win	11–2	Chango Alvarez	KO	2 (10)	Oct 8, 1976	18 years, 41 days	Arena Coliseo, Guadalajara, Mexico	
12	Win	10–2	Chango Alvarez	KO	2 (10)	Sep 17, 1976	18 years, 20 days	Arena Coliseo, Guadalajara, Mexico	
11	Win	9–2	Chango Alvarez	TKO	5 (?)	Sep 1, 1976	18 years, 4 days	San Luis Potosi, Mexico	
10	Win	8–2	Alfonso Ramirez	TKO	2 (10)	Aug 20, 1976	17 years, 358 days	Arena Coliseo, Guadalajara, Mexico	
9	Loss	7–2	Andres Reyes	RTD	3 (10)	May 14, 1976	17 years, 260 days	Arena Coliseo, Guadalajara, Mexico	
8	Win	7–1	Juanito Martinez	KO	2 (10)	Apr 9, 1976	17 years, 225 days	Arena Coliseo, Guadalajara, Mexico	
7	Loss	6–1	Juanito Martinez	KO	2 (?)	Mar 20, 1976	17 years, 205 days	La Paz, Mexico	
6	Win	6–0	Angel Felix	PTS	10	Jan 26, 1976	17 years, 151 days	La Paz, Mexico	
5	Win	5–0	Manuel Montiel	TKO	2 (?)	Jan 2, 1976	17 years, 127 days	Puerto Vallarta, Mexico	
4	Win	4–0	Raul Ochoa	PTS	10	Nov 21, 1975	17 years, 85 days	Arena Coliseo, Guadalajara, Mexico	
3	Win	3–0	Ruperto Guevara	TKO	3 (6)	Sep 19, 1975	17 years, 22 days	Arena Coliseo, Guadalajara, Mexico	
2	Win	2–0	Felipe Mayorga	PTS	4	Jul 4, 1975	16 years, 310 days	Arena Coliseo, Guadalajara, Mexico	
1	Win	1–0	Manuel Ruelas	TKO	1 (4)	Jun 6, 1975	16 years, 282 days	Arena Coliseo, Guadalajara, Mexico	

== See also ==
- List of flyweight boxing champions
- List of WBC world champions
- List of Mexican boxing world champions

Achievements
Preceded by Shoji Oguma	Lineal Flyweight Champion; 12 May 1981– 20 March 1982	Succeeded by Prudencio Cardona
Preceded by Shoji Oguma	WBC Flyweight Champion; 12 May 1981– 20 March 1982	Succeeded by Prudencio Cardona
