= Prudencio Cardona =

Colombian boxer (1951–2019)

Personal information
- Nationality: Colombian
- Born: Prudencio Cardona Cáceres; December 22, 1951 San Basilio de Palenque, Colombia
- Died: August 4, 2019 (aged 67) Barranquilla, Colombia
- Height: 5 ft 6 in (170 cm)
- Weight: Flyweight
- Children: Stephanie "Red Velvet" Cardona (b. 1992)

Boxing career
- Stance: Orthodox

Boxing record
- Total fights: 63
- Wins: 39
- Win by KO: 27
- Losses: 23
- Draws: 1

Prudencio Cardona (December 22, 1951 – August 4, 2019) was a Colombian professional boxer who was world flyweight champion. He represented his native country at the 1972 Summer Olympics in Munich, West Germany. He was the older brother of former super bantamweight world champion, Ricardo Cardona.

== Professional boxing career ==
Prudencio Cardona made his professional boxing debut on November 2, 1973, defeating Luis Ramos by a four-round decision in Barranquilla, Colombia. Twenty two days later, Cardona earned his first knockout win, knocking out Humberto Ortega in four rounds at Barranquilla. Cardona's first seven fights were in Barranquilla; he won five of these bouts by knockout.

On September 29, 1974, Cardona fought away from Barranquilla for the first time, losing his tag as an undefeated fighter when he dropped an eight-round decision to Henry Diaz in Cartagena. Seven weeks later, Prudencio Cardona had his first professional contest in Bogotá, knocking out Ben Villareal in two rounds on November 23. Cardona then won one fight and lost another before having his first bout abroad, on August 9, 1975, when he fought Luis Reyes Arnal in Caracas, Venezuela, defeating Reyes Arnal by a fifth-round knockout. Cardona won seven more fights before returning to Venezuela, where he boxed Betulio González on March 12, 1977, being knocked out in the third round.

Five victories followed his defeat at the hands of Gonzalez. These included a third-round knockout win over Villareal in a rematch, a ten-round decision over future world champion Alfonso Lopez on March 10, 1978, and another win against a future world champion, Luis Ibarra, by decision in ten rounds on June 30, at Barranquilla.

Ibarra and Cardona had an immediate rematch, on February 17, 1979, in Colón, Panama, with Ibarra avenging his loss to Cardona by a ten-round decision. On June 15 of that year, Cardona made his Asian debut, losing to future world champion Seung-Hoon Lee by a ten-round decision in South Korea.

Cardona, however, won nine of his next ten fights by knockout, including victories over Hector Patri, Steve Whitstone and Olympic bronze medalist Orlando Maldonado of Puerto Rico.

== World Flyweight championship ==
These nine wins made Cardona a ranked Flyweight on the WBC, and, on March 20, 1982, he challenged Antonio Avelar for the WBC and Lineal Flyweight titles, in Tampico, Tamaulipas, Mexico. Cardona became world champion by knocking Avelar out in the first round. He lost the titles on his first defense, however, being defeated by two division world champion and another Mexican Freddie Castillo by a fifteen-round unanimous decision on July 24, also in Mexico. Castillo went on to lose the championships to Eleoncio Mercedes.

Cardona won four of his next five bouts, the exception being a ten-round draw (tie), against Soon-Jung Kang on April 2, 1983, in South Korea. On September 15, 1984, Cardona had a chance to become world Flyweight champion for the second time, when he faced WBA world champion Santos Laciar in Argentina. Laciar defeated Cardona by a tenth-round knockout. This was the last world title fight of Cardona's career.

Cardona's career then began to take backwards turns, winning three and losing two of his next five bouts. He did win the national, Colombian Flyweight title by knocking out Toribio Velasco in three rounds on December 14, 1985. But after retaining the title against Josélo Perez on April 5, 1986, by a ten-round decision, Cardona lost his next eight bouts in a row. Included were losses to future world Bantamweight champion Orlando Canizales, who knocked Cardona out on January 30, 1987, in San Antonio, Texas, United States, a ten-round decision loss to Ray Minus on March 5 at the Bahamas, and a ten-round points loss to Juan Polo Perez on May 25 in Cartagena.

On November 27 of that year, Cardona obtained his last victory as a professional, knocking out Teofilo Centeno in the first round at Miami, Florida.

Cardona lost his next five fights before retiring. Among those that beat him were various well-known fighters, such as Dominican Tommy Valoy, then a future world title challenger, by a knockout in six in San Juan, Puerto Rico, future world champion Jose Ruiz, who beat Cardona by a ninth-round knockout on July 11, 1988, also at San Juan, and Darryl Pinckney, who knocked Cardona out in four rounds on June 27, 1992.

The fight with Pinckney turned out to be the last fight boxed by Cardona as a professional. He had also previously lost to Agapito Gómez by a second round disqualification, in Madrid, Spain.

Cardona had a professional boxing record of 40 wins, 23 losses and one draw, with 27 wins by knockout.

== Personal ==
His brother, Ricardo Cardona, was also a well-known world champion boxer, making the Cardona brothers one of the small numbers of sibling couples to have reached world championship status in the sport. He is the father of AEW wrestler Red Velvet. He died on August 4, 2019, at the age of 67.

== Professional boxing record ==
| 64 fights | 39 wins | 24 losses |
|---|---|---|
| By knockout | 27 | 8 |
| By decision | 12 | 15 |
| By disqualification | 0 | 1 |
| Draws | 1 | |

| No. | Result | Record | Opponent | Type | Round, time | Date | Location | Notes |
|---|---|---|---|---|---|---|---|---|
| 63 | Loss | 39–23–1 | Darryl Pinckney | TKO | 4 (8), 2:43 | Jun 27, 1992 | Mahi Temple Shrine Auditorium, Miami, Florida, US | |
| 62 | Loss | 39–22–1 | Jose Valdez | TKO | 7 (?) | Dec 16, 1988 | Guasave, Mexico | |
| 61 | Loss | 39–21–1 | José Ruíz Matos | KO | 9 (?) | Jul 11, 1988 | San Juan, Puerto Rico | |
| 60 | Loss | 39–20–1 | Tommy Valoy | TKO | 6 (?) | Feb 27, 1988 | Coliseo Roberto Clemente, San Juan, Puerto Rico | |
| 59 | Loss | 39–19–1 | Agapito Gomez | DQ | 2 (?) | Dec 18, 1987 | Madrid, Spain | |
| 58 | Win | 39–18–1 | Teofilo Centeno | TKO | 1 (10) | Nov 27, 1987 | Convention Center, Miami Beach, Florida, US | |
| 57 | Loss | 38–18–1 | Richard Clarke | UD | 10 | Sep 25, 1987 | Pegasus Hotel, Kingston, Jamaica | |
| 56 | Loss | 38–17–1 | Luis Monzote | SD | 10 | Sep 12, 1987 | James L. Knight Center, Miami Beach, Florida, US | |
| 55 | Loss | 38–16–1 | Juan Polo Pérez | PTS | 10 | May 25, 1987 | Cartagena, Colombia | |
| 54 | Loss | 38–15–1 | Ray Minus | PTS | 10 | Mar 6, 1987 | Nassau, Bahamas | |
| 53 | Loss | 38–14–1 | Orlando Canizales | TKO | 6 (10), 1:58 | Jan 30, 1987 | Fiesta Plaza Mall, San Antonio, Texas, US | |
| 52 | Loss | 38–13–1 | Raúl Pérez | PTS | 10 | Aug 30, 1986 | Tijuana, Mexico | |
| 51 | Loss | 38–12–1 | Jesse Williams | SD | 10 | Aug 1, 1986 | Tamiami Fairgrounds Auditorium, Miami, Florida, US | |
| 50 | Loss | 38–11–1 | Rafael Cabrera | TKO | 8 (?) | Jun 22, 1986 | Hiram Bithorn Stadium, San Juan, Puerto Rico | |
| 49 | Win | 38–10–1 | Joselo Perez | PTS | 10 | Apr 5, 1986 | Barranquilla, Colombia | Retained Colombian flyweight title |
| 48 | Loss | 37–10–1 | Juan Polo Pérez | PTS | 10 | Jan 13, 1986 | Cartagena, Colombia | |
| 47 | Win | 37–9–1 | Toribio Riasco | KO | 3 (12) | Dec 14, 1985 | Coliseo Humberto Perea, Barranquilla, Colombia | Won vacant Colombian flyweight title |
| 46 | Win | 36–9–1 | Sergio Omar Villouta | TKO | 8 (10) | Jun 29, 1985 | Barranquilla, Colombia | |
| 45 | Loss | 35–9–1 | Agustin Garcia | UD | 10 | Mar 29, 1985 | Cartagena, Colombia | |
| 44 | Win | 35–8–1 | Alfredo Gomez | KO | 2 (?) | Dec 14, 1984 | Cartagena, Colombia | |
| 43 | Loss | 34–8–1 | Santos Laciar | KO | 10 (15), 1:59 | Sep 15, 1984 | Pabellon Verde, Cordoba, Argentina | For WBA flyweight title |
| 42 | Win | 34–7–1 | Rafael Rivas | KO | 2 (?) | May 11, 1984 | Barranquilla, Colombia | |
| 41 | Win | 33–7–1 | Ernesto Sanchez | UD | 10 | Aug 13, 1983 | Gimnasio Nuevo Panama, Panama City, Panama | |
| 40 | Win | 32–7–1 | Agustin Igirio | TKO | 3 (?) | Jun 2, 1983 | Estadio Eduardo Santos, Santa Marta, Colombia | |
| 39 | Draw | 31–7–1 | Soon Jung Kang | PTS | 10 | Apr 2, 1983 | Munhwa Gymnasium, Seoul, South Korea | |
| 38 | Win | 31–7 | Bernardino Moreno | TKO | 10 (10), 1:05 | Mar 4, 1983 | Gimnasio Nuevo Panama, Panama City, Panama | |
| 37 | Loss | 30–7 | Freddy Castillo | UD | 15 | Jul 24, 1982 | Carte Clara Baseball Park, Merida, Mexico | Lost WBC and The Ring flyweight titles |
| 36 | Win | 30–6 | Antonio Avelar | KO | 1 (15), 2:04 | Mar 20, 1982 | Estadio Tamaulipas Futbol, Tampico, Mexico | Won WBC and The Ring flyweight titles |
| 35 | Win | 29–6 | Pascual Polanco | TKO | 5 (?) | Oct 30, 1981 | Coliseo Humberto Perea, Barranquilla, Colombia | |
| 34 | Win | 28–6 | Melquiades Caballero | TKO | 3 (?) | Oct 10, 1981 | San Andres, Colombia | |
| 33 | Win | 27–6 | Pastor Echavarria | KO | 1 (?) | Jul 17, 1981 | Coliseo Humberto Perea, Barranquilla, Colombia | |
| 32 | Win | 26–6 | Orlando Maldonado | KO | 5 (10) | Dec 13, 1980 | Jai Alai Fronton, Miami, Florida, US | |
| 31 | Win | 25–6 | Steve Whetstone | TKO | 1 (6) | Nov 14, 1980 | Jai Alai Fronton, Miami, Florida, US | |
| 30 | Win | 24–6 | Julio Guerrero | PTS | 10 | Jul 11, 1980 | Coliseo Humberto Perea, Barranquilla, Colombia | |
| 29 | Loss | 23–6 | Luis Tapias | UD | 12 | Apr 18, 1980 | Monteria, Colombia | For Colombia and South America flyweight titles |
| 28 | Win | 23–5 | Edelmiro Cassiani | PTS | 10 | Mar 14, 1980 | Coliseo Humberto Perea, Barranquilla, Colombia | |
| 27 | Win | 22–5 | Humberto Mayorga | UD | 10 | Aug 18, 1979 | Plaza de Toros, Maracaibo, Venezuela | |
| 26 | Loss | 21–5 | Seung-hoon Lee | PTS | 10 | May 15, 1979 | Munhwa Gymnasium, Seoul, South Korea | |
| 25 | Loss | 21–4 | Luis Ibarra | UD | 10 | Feb 17, 1979 | Arena de Colon, Colon City, Panama | |
| 24 | Win | 21–3 | Luis Ibarra | PTS | 10 | Jun 30, 1978 | Barranquilla, Colombia | |
| 23 | Win | 20–3 | Alfonso López | PTS | 10 | Mar 10, 1978 | Cartagena, Colombia | |
| 22 | Win | 19–3 | Pablito Jimenez | PTS | 10 | Dec 3, 1977 | Barranquilla, Colombia | |
| 21 | Win | 18–3 | Ben Villareal | KO | 3 (?) | Oct 28, 1977 | Barranquilla, Colombia | |
| 20 | Win | 17–3 | Maximo Rodriguez | KO | 2 (?) | Sep 1, 1977 | Barranquilla, Colombia | |
| 19 | Loss | 16–3 | Betulio González | KO | 3 (10) | Mar 12, 1977 | Maracaibo, Venezuela | |
| 18 | Win | 16–2 | Henry Diaz | PTS | 10 | Nov 7, 1976 | Plaza de Toros de Cartagena de Indias, Cartagena, Colombia | |
| 17 | Win | 15–2 | Eduardo Barragan | TKO | 5 (?) | Mar 26, 1976 | Coliseo Humberto Perea, Barranquilla, Colombia | |
| 16 | Win | 14–2 | Cesar Revollo | PTS | 10 | Feb 8, 1976 | Cartagena, Colombia | |
| 15 | Win | 13–2 | Enrique Torres | PTS | 10 | Oct 31, 1975 | Coliseo Humberto Perea, Barranquilla, Colombia | |
| 14 | Win | 12–2 | Rogelio Minott | KO | 5 (?) | Oct 4, 1975 | Barranquilla, Colombia | |
| 13 | Win | 11–2 | Ricardo Estupinan | KO | 1 (?) | Sep 5, 1975 | Barranquilla, Colombia | |
| 12 | Win | 10–2 | Luis Reyes Arnal | KO | 5 (?) | Aug 9, 1975 | Caracas, Venezuela | |
| 11 | Loss | 9–2 | Calixto Perez | PTS | 10 | May 30, 1975 | Cartagena, Colombia | |
| 10 | Win | 9–1 | Nelson Vergara | KO | 3 (?) | Apr 30, 1975 | Barranquilla, Colombia | |
| 9 | Win | 8–1 | Ben Villareal | KO | 2 (?) | Nov 23, 1974 | Bogota, Colombia | |
| 8 | Loss | 7–1 | Henry Diaz | UD | 8 | Sep 29, 1974 | Estadio 11 de Noviembre, Cartagena, Colombia | |
| 7 | Win | 7–0 | Abdon Peralta | KO | 1 (10) | Aug 17, 1974 | Coliseo Humberto Perea, Barranquilla, Colombia | |
| 6 | Win | 6–0 | Roberto Lopez | RTD | 6 (?) | Jul 5, 1974 | Coliseo Humberto Perea, Barranquilla, Colombia | |
| 5 | Win | 5–0 | Pedro Bendeck | KO | 2 (?) | Jun 13, 1974 | Barranquilla, Colombia | |
| 4 | Win | 4–0 | Eliseo Padilla | KO | 1 (?) | May 10, 1974 | Coliseo Humberto Perea, Barranquilla, Colombia | |
| 3 | Win | 3–0 | Nestor Herrera | PTS | 6 | Jan 18, 1974 | Barranquilla, Colombia | |
| 2 | Win | 2–0 | Humberto Ortega | KO | 4 (6) | Nov 24, 1973 | Coliseo Humberto Perea, Barranquilla, Colombia | |
| 1 | Win | 1–0 | Luis Ramos | TKO | 4 (6) | Nov 2, 1973 | Coliseo Humberto Perea, Barranquilla, Colombia | |

== See also ==
- List of flyweight boxing champions
- List of WBC world champions

Achievements
| Preceded by Antonio Avelar | Lineal Flyweight Champion; 20 Mar 1982 – 24 Jul 1982 | Succeeded by Freddy Castillo |
| Preceded by Antonio Avelar | The Ring Flyweight Champion; 20 Mar 1982 – 24 Jul 1982 | Succeeded by Freddy Castillo |
| Preceded by Antonio Avelar | WBC Flyweight Champion; 20 Mar 1982 – 24 Jul 1982 | Succeeded by Freddy Castillo |
