= Park Chan-hee =

South Korean boxer (born 1957)

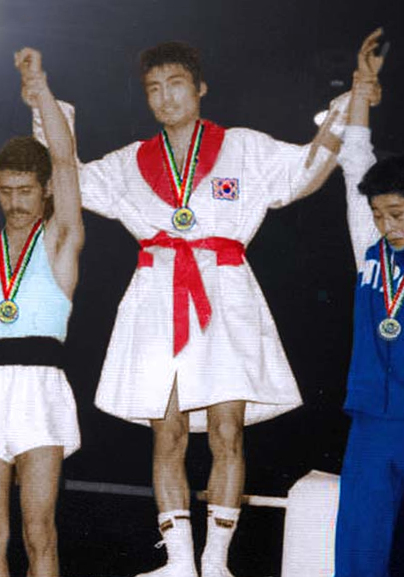
- Park (center) at the 1974 Asian Games

Personal information
- Nationality: South Korean
- Born: 23 March 1957 (age 69) Busan, First Republic of Korea (nowadays South Korea)
- Height: 5 ft 3 1/2 in (161 cm)
- Weight: Light flyweight; Flyweight

Korean name
- Hangul: 박찬희
- Hanja: 朴贊希
- RR: Bak Chanhui
- MR: Pak Ch'anhŭi

Boxing career
- Stance: Orthodox

Boxing record
- Total fights: 23
- Wins: 17
- Win by KO: 6
- Losses: 4
- Draws: 2
Medal record
Men's Boxing
Representing South Korea
Asian Games
| Gold medal – first place | 1974 Tehran | Light Flyweight |

Park Chan-hee (Korean: 박찬희; born 23 March 1957) is a retired South Korean boxer. As a professional he held the WBC and lineal titles in the flyweight division. As an amateur he won a gold medal at the 1974 Asian Games and placed fifth at the 1976 Summer Olympics.

== Amateur career ==
Park competed at the 1976 Montreal Olympic Games as a Light Flyweight for South Korea. His results were:

- Defeated Abderahim Najim (Morocco) DQ 3
- Defeated Alican Az (Turkey) 5–0
- Lost to Jorge Hernandez (Cuba) 2–3

== Professional career ==
Park turned professional in 1976 and became the WBC and lineal flyweight champion with a decision win over Miguel Canto in 1979. He lost the titles to Shoji Oguma by KO in 1980. He would attempt to regain these title by facing Oguma a further two times, losing on both occasions.

== Professional boxing record ==
| 23 fights | 17 wins | 4 losses |
|---|---|---|
| By knockout | 6 | 2 |
| By decision | 11 | 2 |
| Draws | 2 | |

| No. | Result | Record | Opponent | Type | Round, time | Date | Location | Notes |
|---|---|---|---|---|---|---|---|---|
| 23 | Loss | 17–4–2 | Wick Tengam | TKO | 4 (10) | Dec 12, 1982 | Munhwa Gymnasium, Seoul, South Korea | |
| 22 | Win | 17–3–2 | Rocky Pineda | PTS | 4 | Oct 17, 1982 | Munhwa Gymnasium, Seoul, South Korea | |
| 21 | Win | 16–3–2 | Katsuyuki Ohashi | PTS | 10 | Aug 15, 1982 | Munhwa Gymnasium, Seoul, South Korea | |
| 20 | Loss | 15–3–2 | Shoji Oguma | MD | 15 | Feb 3, 1981 | Korakuen Hall, Tokyo, Japan | For WBC and The Ring flyweight titles |
| 19 | Loss | 15–2–2 | Shoji Oguma | SD | 15 | Oct 18, 1980 | Miyagi Prefectural Gymnasium, Sendai, Japan | For WBC and The Ring flyweight titles |
| 18 | Win | 15–1–2 | Ver Libradilla | TD | 6 (10) | Jul 26, 1980 | Munhwa Gymnasium, Seoul, South Korea | |
| 17 | Loss | 14–1–2 | Shoji Oguma | KO | 9 (15) | May 18, 1980 | Jangchung Gymnasium, Seoul, South Korea | Lost WBC and The Ring flyweight titles |
| 16 | Win | 14–0–2 | Alberto Morales | UD | 15 | Apr 13, 1980 | Daegu Gymnasium, Daegu, South Korea | Retained WBC and The Ring flyweight titles |
| 15 | Win | 13–0–2 | Arnel Arrozal | UD | 15 | Feb 10, 1980 | Jangchung Gymnasium, Seoul, South Korea | Retained WBC and The Ring flyweight titles |
| 14 | Win | 12–0–2 | Guty Espadas | KO | 2 (15) | Dec 16, 1979 | Gudeok Gymnasium, Busan, South Korea | Retained WBC and The Ring flyweight titles |
| 13 | Draw | 11–0–2 | Miguel Canto | PTS | 15 | Sep 9, 1979 | Jamsil Gymnasium, Seoul, South Korea | Retained WBC and The Ring flyweight titles |
| 12 | Win | 11–0–1 | Chikara Igarashi | UD | 15 | May 20, 1979 | Jangchung Arena, Seoul, South Korea | Retained WBC and The Ring flyweight titles |
| 11 | Win | 10–0–1 | Miguel Canto | UD | 15 | Mar 18, 1979 | Gudeok Gymnasium, Busan, South Korea | Won WBC and The Ring flyweight titles |
| 10 | Draw | 9–0–1 | Siony Carupo | PTS | 10 | Feb 18, 1979 | Munhwa Gymnasium, Seoul, South Korea | |
| 9 | Win | 9–0 | Rolly Ramos | PTS | 10 | Oct 21, 1978 | Munhwa Gymnasium, Seoul, South Korea | |
| 8 | Win | 8–0 | Torayuki Nanasha | KO | 6 (10) | Sep 8, 1978 | Chungmu Gymnasium, Daejeon, South Korea | |
| 7 | Win | 7–0 | Mikio Uchida | KO | 3 (10) | Aug 12, 1978 | Munhwa Gymnasium, Seoul, South Korea | |
| 6 | Win | 6–0 | Puma Koya | KO | 2 (10) | Apr 16, 1978 | Gudeok Gymnasium, Busan, South Korea | |
| 5 | Win | 5–0 | George Pedroso | PTS | 10 | Feb 18, 1978 | Munhwa Gymnasium, Seoul, South Korea | |
| 4 | Win | 4–0 | Pedro Solo | PTS | 10 | Nov 26, 1977 | Gudeok Gymnasium, Busan, South Korea | |
| 3 | Win | 3–0 | Sang Il Jung | PTS | 10 | Oct 1, 1977 | Gudeok Gymnasium, Busan, South Korea | |
| 2 | Win | 2–0 | Yukimitsu Kondo | KO | 3 (10) | Sep 10, 1977 | Munhwa Gymnasium, Seoul, South Korea | |
| 1 | Win | 1–0 | Chuji Muto | KO | 1 (8) | Jul 9, 1977 | Gudeok Gymnasium, Busan, South Korea | |

== See also ==
- List of Korean boxers
- Lineal championship
- List of world flyweight boxing champions

Sporting positions
World boxing titles
| Preceded by Miguel Canto | WBC flyweight champion 18 March 1979 – 18 May 1980 | Succeeded by Shoji Oguma |
| Preceded by Miguel Canto | The Ring flyweight champion 18 March 1979 – 18 May 1980 | Succeeded by Shoji Oguma |
Awards
| Previous: Leon Spinks | The Ring Progress of the Year; 1979 | Next: No award given from 1980 - 1982 |
