= Guty Espadas =

Mexican boxer (born 1954)

Personal information
- Nickname: Puro Yucatán
- Nationality: (Mexico) Mexican
- Born: Gustavo Hernan Espadas Cruz; December 20, 1954 (age 71) Mérida, Yucatán, Mexico
- Weight: Lightweight; Featherweight; Super bantamweight Flyweight

Boxing career
- Stance: Orthodox

Boxing record
- Total fights: 50
- Wins: 39
- Win by KO: 28
- Losses: 6
- Draws: 5

Guty Espadas (born December 20, 1954) is a Mexican former professional boxer who won the WBA flyweight title. He is also the father of former World Champion Guty Espadas Jr.

== Early life ==
He was born to Hernan Espadas Cruz and Isabel Cruz Espadas.

== Professional career ==
He became a professional boxer in 1971.

=== WBA Flyweight Championship ===
He won the WBA Flyweight Championship on October 2, 1976, when he knocked out Alfonso Lopez in thirteen rounds. He defended the title four times before losing it to Betulio González on August 12, 1978, via a fifteen-round majority decision. He challenged twice more for world titles, although he was unsuccessful in both tries. After his final try, a tenth-round knockout loss to Payao Poontarat in 1984, he retired.

== Personal life ==
His son, Guty Espadas Jr., was a boxing champion in the Featherweight division.

== Professional boxing record ==
50 fights	39 wins	6 losses
By knockout	28	3
By decision	11	3
Draws	5	

No.	Result	Record	Opponent	Type	Round	Date	Location	Notes
50	Loss	39–6–5	Payao Poontarat	TKO	10 (12)	Mar 28, 1984	Rajadamnern Stadium, Bangkok, Thailand	For WBC super flyweight title
49	Win	39–5–5	Elid Fernandez	KO	1 (?)	Feb 11, 1984	Merida, Yucatán, Mexico	
48	Win	38–5–5	Raul Valdez	PTS	10	Nov 26, 1983	Merida, Yucatán, Mexico	
47	Win	37–5–5	Juan Diaz	TKO	6 (?)	May 14, 1983	Merida, Yucatán, Mexico	
46	Win	36–5–5	Rodolfo Ortega	KO	7 (?)	Nov 13, 1982	Merida, Yucatán, Mexico	
45	Loss	35–5–5	Eleoncio Mercedes	TKO	9 (10)	Feb 21, 1981	Merida, Yucatán, Mexico	
44	Win	35–4–5	Rodolfo Martínez	TKO	10 (10)	Dec 20, 1980	Merida, Yucatán, Mexico	
43	Win	34–4–5	Franco Torregoza	UD	10	Aug 19, 1980	Stockton, California, U.S.	
42	Loss	33–4–5	Chan Hee Park	KO	2 (15)	Dec 16, 1979	Gudeok Gymnasium, Busan, South Korea	For WBC and The Ring flyweight titles
41	Win	33–3–5	Jose Luis Cruz	TKO	6 (?)	Aug 11, 1979	Merida, Yucatán, Mexico	
40	Win	32–3–5	Bobby Ruiz	KO	7 (?)	Mar 5, 1979	Houston, Texas, U.S.	
39	Win	31–3–5	Ruben Mancilla	KO	3 (?)	Feb 10, 1979	Parque Carta Clara, Merida, Yucatán, Mexico	
38	Loss	30–3–5	Betulio González	MD	15	Aug 12, 1978	Maestranza Cesar Giron, Maracay, Venezuela	Lost WBA flyweight title
37	Win	30–2–5	Kimio Furesawa	TKO	7 (15)	Jan 2, 1978	Shinagawa Sports Land, Tokyo, Japan	Retained WBA flyweight title
36	Win	29–2–5	Alex Guido	KO	8 (15)	Nov 19, 1977	Sports Arena, Los Angeles, California, U.S.	Retained WBA flyweight title
35	Win	28–2–5	Alfonso López	TKO	13 (15)	Apr 30, 1977	Parque Carta Clara, Merida, Yucatán, Mexico	Retained WBA flyweight title
34	Win	27–2–5	Jiro Takada	KO	7 (15)	Jan 1, 1977	Nihon University Auditorium, Tokyo, Japan	Retained WBA flyweight title
33	Win	26–2–5	Alfonso López	TKO	13 (15)	Oct 2, 1976	Sports Arena, Los Angeles, California, U.S.	Won WBA flyweight title
32	Win	25–2–5	Ryuji Iwamoto	KO	2 (10)	Aug 25, 1976	Merida, Yucatán, Mexico	
31	Win	24–2–5	Al Gutierrez	TKO	4 (?)	Jul 21, 1976	Merida, Yucatán, Mexico	
30	Draw	23–2–5	Willie Jensen	SD	10	May 8, 1976	Forum, Inglewood, California, U.S.	
29	Win	23–2–4	Orlando Hernandez	TKO	1 (10)	Feb 4, 1976	Plaza de Toros, Merida, Yucatán, Mexico	
28	Win	22–2–4	Juan Jose Guzman	KO	2 (?)	Aug 6, 1975	Merida, Yucatán, Mexico	
27	Loss	21–2–4	Alberto Morales	PTS	10	Mar 29, 1975	Centro Internacional Acapulco, Acapulco, Guerrero, Mexico	
26	Loss	21–1–4	Pablito Jimenez	SD	10	Oct 5, 1974	Merida, Yucatán, Mexico	
25	Win	21–0–4	Ricardo Delgado	PTS	10	Aug 7, 1974	Merida, Yucatán, Mexico	
24	Win	20–0–4	Alfonso Aguilar	KO	2 (?)	Jun 29, 1974	Valladolid, Yucatán, Mexico	
23	Win	19–0–4	Roberto Alvarez	KO	10 (10)	Apr 27, 1974	Plaza de Toros, Merida, Yucatán, Mexico	
22	Win	18–0–4	Hector Mendieta	PTS	12	Dec 8, 1973	Merida, Yucatán, Mexico	Won vacant Yucatan State flyweight title
21	Win	17–0–4	Luis Enrique Garcia	KO	4 (?)	Nov 17, 1973	Merida, Yucatán, Mexico	
20	Draw	16–0–4	Chucho Loria	PTS	6	Oct 5, 1973	Progreso, Yucatán, Mexico	
19	Win	16–0–3	Kid Valente	TKO	7 (?)	Jun 29, 1973	Chetumal, Quintana Roo, Mexico	
18	Draw	15–0–3	Raul Tirado	PTS	10	Jan 24, 1973	Merida, Yucatán, Mexico	
17	Win	15–0–2	Daniel Acuna	KO	4 (?)	Aug 23, 1972	Merida, Yucatán, Mexico	
16	Win	14–0–2	Fortino Mendez	KO	2 (?)	Jul 26, 1972	Merida, Yucatán, Mexico	
15	Win	13–0–2	Juan Gomez	KO	1 (?)	Jun 14, 1972	Merida, Yucatán, Mexico	
14	Win	12–0–2	Kid Valente	PTS	8	May 3, 1972	Merida, Yucatán, Mexico	
13	Win	11–0–2	Kid Valente	PTS	10	Feb 4, 1972	Cozumel, Quintana Roo, Mexico	
12	Win	10–0–2	Chucho Loria	PTS	6	Jan 12, 1972	Merida, Yucatán, Mexico	
11	Win	9–0–2	Miguel Caballero	TKO	4 (6)	Dec 15, 1971	Merida, Yucatán, Mexico	
10	Win	8–0–2	Baby Salazar	KO	1 (?)	Nov 17, 1971	Merida, Yucatán, Mexico	
9	Win	7–0–2	Zorrita Kid	KO	3 (?)	Nov 5, 1971	Cozumel, Quintana Roo, Mexico	
8	Win	6–0–2	Freddy Castillo	KO	4 (?)	Sep 22, 1971	Merida, Yucatán, Mexico	
7	Draw	5–0–2	Panterita de Santa Cruz	PTS	6	Sep 15, 1971	Becal, Campeche, Mexico	
6	Draw	5–0–1	Chucho Loria	PTS	4	Jul 28, 1971	Merida, Yucatán, Mexico	
5	Win	5–0	Miguel Camargo	PTS	4	Jun 30, 1971	Merida, Yucatán, Mexico	
4	Win	4–0	Miguel Caballero	KO	4 (?)	Jun 2, 1971	Merida, Yucatán, Mexico	
3	Win	3–0	Chucho Loria	PTS	6	Apr 4, 1971	Tizimin, Yucatán, Mexico	
2	Win	2–0	Kid Tabaquito	PTS	4	Feb 4, 1971	Tekax, Yucatán, Mexico	
1	Win	1–0	RaEaga Luna	PTS	4	Jan 29, 1971	Tekax, Yucatán, Mexico	

Preceded by Alfonso Lopez	WBA Flyweight Champion; 2 Oct 1976–12 Aug 1978	Succeeded by Betulio González

== See also ==
- List of flyweight boxing champions
- List of WBA world champions
- List of Mexican boxing world champions
- Notable boxing families
