= Martín Vargas =

Chilean boxer (born 1955)

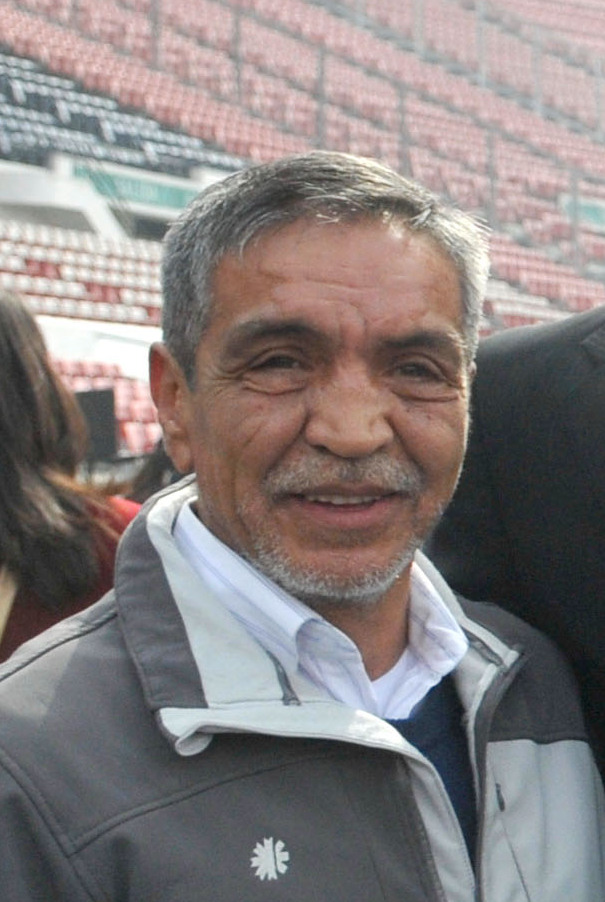

Personal information
- Born: Martín Vargas Fuentes; 24 January 1955 (age 71) Osorno, Chile
- Died: -
- Weight: Flyweight; Super flyweight

Boxing career
- Stance: Orthodox

Boxing record
- Total fights: 109
- Wins: 91
- Win by KO: 63
- Losses: 15
- Draws: 3
- No contests: 0

Martín Vargas Fuentes (born 24 January 1955) is a Chilean former professional boxer who challenged for a world title four times. As an amateur, he represented his native country at the 1972 Summer Olympics in Munich, West Germany.

== Professional career ==
On March 23, 1973, Vargas made his professional debut, beating Martín Muñoz by a decision in six rounds. He won twelve fights in a row before drawing (tying) with Nelson Muñoz on December 13, 1973. In 1974, he tasted defeat for the first time when he was knocked out in seven rounds by Alfredo Alcayaga. On October 11 of that same year, he and Alcayaga had a rematch, this time with the Chilean national flyweight title at stake. Vargas avenged his first defeat with a seven-round knockout win. One month later, he had his first fight abroad, a ten-round draw with Carlos Escalante]in Buenos Aires.

After fourteen wins in a row, Vargas had a chance to add the South American regional belt to his resume, and he did so by knocking out Gonzalo Cruz in round one on December 20, 1975 in Santiago. He defended that title twice, and after beating Carlos Escalante in their Uruguay rematch, Vargas' win streak reached 27 wins in a row.

On September 17, 1977, he fought for the world title for the first time; World Boxing Council world flyweight champion Miguel Canto defeated Vargas by a fifteen-round decision in Yucatán, Mexico. Vargas had one more win: two months after their first fight, Vargas once again challenged Canto, this time in Santiago. Canto broke the hearts of most Vargas fans on November 30, 1977 by defeating the hometown favorite, again by a fifteen-round decision.

On April 22, 1978, Vargas beat future world champion Alfonso López by a knockout in round one to defend his South American title with success. On November 4 of that year, he challenged World Boxing Association (WBA) world champion Betulio González in the champion's hometown of Maracay, Venezuela, but González retained the crown with a twelfth-round knockout victory. This defeat was followed by thirteen wins in a row, including points wins over future world champions Joey Olivo and Rafael Pedroza (cousin of Eusebio Pedroza). Vargas then traveled to Japan, where on June 1 he lost by a knockout in round eight what turned out to be his last world title bid to WBA world Junior flyweight champion Yoko Gushiken.

After the Gushiken fight, Vargas had a rather ordinary record of 21 wins and 7 losses before retiring for the first time in 1987. He did, however, add another regional title to his trophy case when he beat Delis Rojas on July 23, 1982 by a decision in twelve rounds in Miami, to earn the WBC Continental Americas flyweight title.

Following his retirement, Vargas has been cited as a significant figure in Chilean boxing. He is frequently noted for his world title challenges and remains a prominent athlete in the country's sporting history.

In 1997, ten years after his original retirement, Vargas attempted a comeback. His first fight back was videotaped by a crew making a documentary film about him, and he defeated Gerónimo Rojas by a knockout in round two on July 4. On February 7, 1998, he added the Chilean Super Flyweight title to his collection of regional titles with a first-round knockout over José Carmona. One month later, he beat Juan Lielmil, also by knockout in round one, to regain the Chilean flyweight title. But after losing to Joel García, by knockout in round one on July 31 of that same year, he decided to retire permanently.

Vargas had a record of 91 wins, 15 losses and 3 draws, his 62 knockout wins making him a member of the exclusive group of fighters who have won 50 or more fights by knockout. In addition to the documentary about his comeback, a biographical movie about him was also produced in Chile.

== 1972 Olympic results ==
Below are the results of Martín Vargas, a Chilean flyweight boxer who competed at the 1972 Munich Olympics:

- Round of 64: bye
- Round of 32: lost to Calixto Perez (Colombia) on points, 0-5.
