= Shoji Oguma =

Japanese boxer

Shoji Oguma 大熊 正二
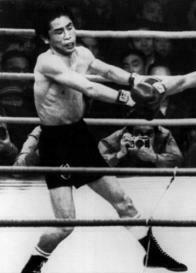
- Oguma in a match in 1975

Personal information
- Nationality: Japanese
- Born: July 22, 1951 (age 75) Kōriyama, Japan
- Height: 5 ft 3 1/2 in (161 cm)
- Weight: Flyweight; Super flyweight

Boxing career
- Stance: Southpaw

Boxing record
- Total fights: 49
- Wins: 38
- Win by KO: 20
- Losses: 10
- Draws: 1

Shoji Oguma (Japanese: 大熊 正二; born July 22, 1951) is a Japanese former professional boxer who held the WBC and Lineal titles in the Flyweight division.

== Professional career ==
Oguma turned pro in 1970 and in 1974 won the WBC Flyweight Title by winning a split decision over Betulio González. He lost the title three months later in his first defense against Miguel Canto. In 1976, Oguma challenged WBA Flyweight champion Alfonso Lopez but lost a majority decision. In 1978 he landed a rematch with WBC Flyweight champion Canto but came up short with a split decision loss. Later that year he fought his third bout with Canto, and this time lost a more clear unanimous decision to complete their trilogy.

In 1979 he rematched WBA Flyweight champion Gonzalez and the result was a draw. Later that year they fought a rematch and Gonzalez came up with the victory via a 12th-round KO in their third match.

== Winning the lineal championship ==
In 1980 Oguma landed a shot at WBC and Lineal Flyweight Champion Chan-Hee Park and KO'd Park in the 9th round to capture the titles. He defended the titles twice the same year, including a split decision over Park, and his annual performance was named Ring magazine Comeback of the Year for 1980.

In 1981 Oguma defended the titles successfully again against Park, but lost the belts in his following bout by KO to Antonio Avelar. He then moved up in weight and in 1982 took on WBA Super Flyweight Title holder Jiro Watanabe, but was TKO'd in the 12th. Oguma retired after the bout.

== Professional boxing record ==
49 fights	38 wins	10 losses
By knockout	20	4
By decision	18	6
Draws	1	

No.	Result	Record	Opponent	Type	Round, time	Date	Location	Notes
49	Loss	38–10–1	Jiro Watanabe	TKO	12 (15)	1982-11-11	City Gymnasium, Hamamatsu, Japan	For WBA super flyweight title
48	Win	38–9–1	Jackal Maruyama	PTS	10 (10)	1982-06-24	Korakuen Hall, Tokyo, Japan	
47	Win	37–9–1	Chan Young Park	UD	10 (10)	1982-03-24	Korakuen Hall, Tokyo, Japan	
46	Loss	36–9–1	Antonio Avelar	KO	7 (15)	1981-05-12	City Gymnasium, Mito, Japan	Lost WBC & The Ring flyweight titles
45	Win	36–8–1	Park Chan-hee	MD	15 (15)	1981-02-03	Korakuen Hall, Tokyo, Japan	Retained WBC & The Ring flyweight titles
44	Win	35–8–1	Park Chan-hee	SD	15 (15)	1980-10-18	Miyagi Prefectural Gymnasium, Sendai, Japan	Retained WBC & The Ring flyweight titles
43	Win	34–8–1	Kim Sung-jun	SD	15 (15)	1980-07-28	Kuramae Kokugikan, Tokyo, Japan	Retained WBC & The Ring flyweight titles
42	Win	33–8–1	Park Chan-hee	KO	9 (15)	1980-05-18	Jangchung Gymnasium, Seoul, South Korea	Won WBC & The Ring flyweight titles
41	Win	32–8–1	Chikara Igarashi	KO	8 (10)	1979-12-17	Korakuen Hall, Tokyo, Japan	
40	Loss	31–8–1	Betulio González	KO	12 (15)	1979-07-06	Tochigi Prefectural Gym, Utsunomiya, Japan	For WBA flyweight title
39	Draw	31–7–1	Betulio González	SD	15 (15)	1979-01-29	City Gymnasium, Hamamatsu, Japan	For WBA flyweight title
38	Win	31–7	Shinji Suka	KO	3 (10)	1978-11-23	Korakuen Hall, Tokyo, Japan	
37	Win	30–7	Puma Koya	PTS	10 (10)	1978-09-25	Shizuoka, Japan	
36	Loss	29–7	Miguel Canto	UD	15 (15)	1978-04-18	Kuramae Kokugikan, Tokyo, Japan	For WBC & The Ring flyweight titles
35	Loss	29–6	Miguel Canto	SD	15 (15)	1978-01-04	City Sogo Gym, Kōriyama, Japan	For WBC & The Ring flyweight titles
34	Win	29–5	Puma Koya	TKO	5 (10)	1977-08-29	Korakuen Hall, Tokyo, Japan	
33	Win	28–5	Kim Sung-jun	PTS	10 (10)	1977-02-15	Korakuen Hall, Tokyo, Japan	
32	Loss	27–5	Kimio Furesawa	KO	8 (10)	1976-12-14	Korakuen Hall, Tokyo, Japan	
31	Win	27–4	Chun Ha Park	KO	3 (10)	1976-09-07	Korakuen Hall, Tokyo, Japan	
30	Win	26–4	Dong Rae Lim	KO	4 (10)	1976-07-18	Kōriyama, Japan	
29	Loss	25–4	Alfonso López	MD	15 (15)	1976-04-21	Nihon University Auditorium, Tokyo, Japan	For WBA flyweight title
28	Win	25–3	Dommy Marolena	KO	10 (10)	1976-02-13	Korakuen Hall, Tokyo, Japan	
27	Win	24–3	Yuji Matsunaga	KO	1 (10)	1975-11-07	Korakuen Hall, Tokyo, Japan	
26	Win	23–3	Kazuo Aikawa	KO	5 (10)	1975-08-22	Korakuen Hall, Tokyo, Japan	
25	Win	22–3	Peter Noble	KO	9 (10)	1975-04-25	Korakuen Hall, Tokyo, Japan	
24	Loss	21–3	Miguel Canto	MD	15 (15)	1975-01-08	Miyagi Sports Center, Sendai, Japan	Lost WBC title, for vacant The Ring flyweight title
23	Win	21–2	Betulio González	SD	15 (15)	1974-10-01	Nihon University Auditorium, Tokyo, Japan	Won WBC flyweight title
22	Loss	20–2	Betulio González	PTS	10 (10)	1974-05-19	City Sogo Gym, Kōriyama, Japan	
21	Win	20–1	Kenji Kato	PTS	10 (10)	1974-03-24	Japan	
20	Win	19–1	Issei Sugamoto	PTS	10 (10)	1973-11-23	Japan	
19	Win	18–1	Dong Ki Cho	PTS	10 (10)	1973-09-07	Japan	
18	Win	17–1	Go Mifune	PTS	10 (10)	1973-07-02	Korakuen Hall, Tokyo, Japan	
17	Win	16–1	Tatsuo Shimizu	KO	4 (10)	1973-05-06	Utsunomiya, Japan	
16	Win	15–1	Kazuaki Koyanagi	KO	4 (8)	1973-04-05	Japan	
15	Win	14–1	Jiro Shimizu	KO	4 (8)	1973-01-18	Japan	
14	Win	13–1	Matsushi Yoshida	PTS	6 (6)	1972-09-15	Nihon University Auditorium, Tokyo, Japan	
13	Win	12–1	Hiro Hamada	PTS	8 (8)	1972-08-05	Utsunomiya, Japan	
12	Win	11–1	Seiichi Kobayashi	KO	1 (6)	1972-06-29	Japan	
11	Win	10–1	Masakuni Kawakami	PTS	6 (6)	1972-04-14	Sendai, Japan	
10	Win	9–1	Moriyuki Sasaki	KO	1 (6)	1972-03-23	Japan	
9	Win	8–1	Masamitsu Katayama	KO	2 (4)	1971-12-27	Kōriyama, Japan	
8	Win	7–1	Masao Ohara	KO	3 (4)	1971-11-18	Korakuen Hall, Tokyo, Japan	
7	Win	6–1	Kazuo Aikawa	KO	4 (4)	1971-10-14	Japan	
6	Loss	5–1	Masakuni Kawakami	PTS	4 (4)	1971-08-19	Korakuen Hall, Tokyo, Japan	
5	Win	5–0	Yoshio Tabata	PTS	4 (4)	1971-07-30	Japan	
4	Win	4–0	Toshiaki Nishio	KO	1 (4)	1971-05-13	Japan	
3	Win	3–0	Masamitsu Sugawara	PTS	4 (4)	1971-03-20	Japan	
2	Win	2–0	Kenetsuro Kikuchi	PTS	4 (4)	1971-02-12	Japan	
1	Win	1–0	Kenji Yoshii	KO	1 (4)	1970-12-26	Japan	

== See also ==
- List of southpaw stance boxers
- Lineal championship
- Boxing in Japan
- List of Japanese boxing world champions
- List of world flyweight boxing champions

Sporting positions
World boxing titles
Preceded by Betulio González	WBC flyweight champion October 1, 1974 – January 8, 1975	Succeeded by Miguel Canto
Preceded by Park Chan-hee	WBC flyweight champion May 18, 1980 – May 12, 1981	Succeeded by Antonio Avelar
Preceded by Park Chan-hee	The Ring flyweight champion May 18, 1980 – May 12, 1981	Succeeded by Antonio Avelar
