= Guty Espadas Jr. =

Mexican boxer (born 1974)

Personal information
- Nickname: Guty
- Nationality: (Mexico) Mexican
- Born: Gustavo Espadas espinosa September 2, 1974 (age 51) Mérida, Yucatán, Mexico
- Height: 5 ft 11 in (182 cm)
- Weight: Light Welterweight; Lightweight; Super Featherweight; Featherweight

Boxing career
- Reach: 73 in (185 cm)
- Stance: Orthodox

Boxing record
- Total fights: 53
- Wins: 45
- Win by KO: 28
- Losses: 8
- Draws: 0
- No contests: 0

Gustavo Espinosa Espadas Jr. (born September 2, 1974 in Mérida, Yucatán, Mexico) is a Mexican former professional boxer in the Featherweight division. He is the former WBC Featherweight Champion and the son of former WBA Flyweight Champion, Guty Espadas.

== Professional career ==
Espadas Jr. turned professional in 1992.

=== WBC Featherweight Championship ===
In 2000 won the Vacant WBC Featherweight Championship by winning a technical decision over Luisito Espinosa in the 11th round. He defended the belt once before losing a close decision to Erik Morales in 2001.

In 2003 he rematched Morales but was knocked out in the 3rd round.

He announced his retirement after sustaining a 2nd round knockout loss to Rocky Juarez in 2004, only to come out of it in 2007 by beating Moises Perez twice in the same year.

== Professional boxing record ==
53 fights	45 wins	8 losses
By knockout	28	3
By decision	17	5

No.	Result	Record	Opponent	Type	Round, time	Date	Location	Notes
53	Loss	45–8	Elio Rojas	UD	12	20 Feb 2010	Poliforum Zamna, Mérida, Mexico	For WBC featherweight title
52	Win	45–7	Juan Carlos Martínez	SD	10	4 Apr 2009	Ciudad Victoria, Tamaulipas, Mexico	
51	Win	44–7	Fredy Blandón	TD	10 (10)	20 Dec 2008	Parque Andrés Quintana Roo, Cozumel, Mexico	Unanimous TD: Unintentional head-butt cut Espadas over left eye
50	Win	43–7	Pascual Vázquez	KO	1 (10), 0:57	24 Oct 2008	Sindicato de Taxistas, Cancún, Mexico	
49	Win	42–7	Naoki Matsuda	TKO	2 (12), 1:06	31 May 2008	Centro Internacional de Convenciones, Chetumal, Mexico	
48	Win	41–7	Eduardo Robledo	KO	4 (10)	15 Dec 1997	Plaza de Toros, Cancún, Mexico	
47	Win	40–7	Moisés Pérez	TKO	11 (12)	28 Jul 2007	Sindicato de Taxistas, Cancún, Mexico	Won vacant WBC Mundo Hispano featherweight title
46	Win	39–7	Moisés Pérez	SD	10	31 Mar 2007	Centro de Cancún, Cancún, Mexico	
45	Loss	38–7	Rocky Juarez	KO	2 (12), 2:24	3 Dec 2004	Ballys Park Hotel Casino, Atlantic City, New Jersey, U.S.	For WBC Continental Americas featherweight title
44	Win	38–6	Ramón Pérez	TKO	10 (10), 2:02	23 Jul 2004	Cancún, Quintana Roo, Mexico	
43	Loss	37–6	Érik Morales	KO	3 (12), 2:58	4 Oct 2003	Staples Center, Los Angeles, California, U.S.	
42	Win	37–5	Juan Manuel Chávez	TKO	4 (10)	20 Jun 2003	Papenque del Hipódromo de Agua Caliente, Tijuana, Mexico	
41	Win	36–5	Clarence Adams	SD	12	16 Nov 2002	Mandalay Bay, Paradise, Nevada, U.S.	Won vacant WBC Continental Americas featherweight title
40	Loss	35–5	Héctor Velázquez	SD	10	25 Jun 2002	Ho-Chunk Casino, Baraboo, Wisconsin, U.S.	
39	Win	35–4	Isidro Tejedor	TKO	10 (10)	8 Feb 2002	Don Haskins Center, El Paso, Texas, U.S.	
38	Loss	34–4	William Abelyan	UD	10	5 Aug 2001	Plaza Hotel & Casino, Las Vegas, Nevada, U.S.	
37	Win	34–3	José Pablo Estrella	TKO	6 (10)	1 Jun 2001	Poliforum Zamna, Mérida, Mexico	
36	Loss	33–3	Érik Morales	UD	12	17 Feb 2001	MGM Grand Garden Arena, Paradise, Nevada, U.S.	Lost WBC featherweight title
35	Win	33–2	Wethya Sakmuangklang	UD	12	23 Jun 2000	Poliforum Zamna, Mérida, Mexico	Retained WBC featherweight title
34	Win	32–2	Luisito Espinosa	TD	11 (12), 2:40	14 Apr 2000	Poliforum Zamna, Mérida, Mexico	Won vacant WBC featherweight title; Unanimous TD: Fight stopped after accidental head-butt
33	Win	31–2	Frangky Mamuaya	TKO	1 (10), 2:17	9 Aug 1999	Arrowhead Arena, Anaheim, California, U.S.	
32	Win	30–2	Rodrigo López	TKO	4	11 Jun 1999	Gimnasio Jacinto Canek, Cancún, Mexico	
31	Win	29–2	Óscar Maldonado	KO	2 (10), 2:55	26 Apr 1999	Arrowhead Pond, Anaheim, California, U.S.	
30	Win	28–2	César Güémez	UD	10	26 Mar 1999	Plaza de Toros, Mérida, Mexico	
29	Win	27–2	Ricardo Medina	SD	10	7 Dec 1998	Great Western Forum, Inglewood, California, U.S.	
28	Win	26–2	Jesse Magaña	TD	8 (10), 3:00	20 Jun 1998	Tropicana Hotel & Casino, Paradise, Nevada, U.S.	Unanimous TD
27	Win	25–2	Agapito Sánchez	MD	10	20 Apr 1998	Great Western Forum, Inglewood, California, U.S.	
26	Win	24–2	Manuel Chávez	KO	10 (12)	14 Feb 1998	Mexico City, Distrito Federal, Mexico	Retained WBC Continental Americas featherweight title
25	Win	23–2	Héctor Javier Márquez	SD	12	13 Dec 1997	Mexico City, Distrito Federal, Mexico	Won WBC Continental Americas featherweight title
24	Win	22–2	Alfred Kotey	UD	10	12 Aug 1997	DoubleTree Hotel, Ontario, California, U.S.	
23	Win	21–2	Ramiro Sarauz	KO	2	9 Jul 1997	Mérida, Yucatán, Mexico	
22	Loss	20–2	Jesus Salud	UD	10	3 Dec 1996	Fantasy Springs Casino, Indio, California, U.S.	
21	Win	20–1	Rodrigo Cerda	UD	10	16 Sep 1996	Arizona Charlie's, Las Vegas, Nevada, U.S.	
20	Loss	19–1	Darryl Pinckney	TKO	7 (10), 0:19	10 Jun 1996	Club Rio, Phoenix, Arizona, U.S.	
19	Win	19–0	Raúl Martínez Mora	UD	10	9 Mar 1996	Mérida, Yucatán, Mexico	
18	Win	18–0	Óscar Tinajero	KO	1	23 Dec 1995	Mérida, Yucatán, Mexico	
17	Win	17–0	Benito Rodríguez	UD	10	17 Jun 1995	Mérida, Yucatán, Mexico	
16	Win	16–0	Juan Valencia	KO	2	20 May 1995	Mérida, Yucatán, Mexico	
15	Win	15–0	Luis Espinoza	TKO	5 (10)	11 Mar 1995	Mérida, Yucatán, Mexico	
14	Win	14–0	José Antonio Pachecano	KO	2	21 Nov 1995	Mérida, Yucatán, Mexico	
13	Win	13–0	César Abundis	KO	2	3 Dec 1993	Mérida, Yucatán, Mexico	
12	Win	12–0	Juan Catzin	TKO	4	29 Oct 1994	Mérida, Yucatán, Mexico	
11	Win	11–0	José Rodríguez	KO	4	22 Jul 1994	Mérida, Yucatán, Mexico	
10	Win	10–0	Orlando Rojas	PTS	8	21 May 1994	Mérida, Yucatán, Mexico	
9	Win	9–0	Alonso Zumárraga	TKO	3	5 Mar 1994	Mérida, Yucatán, Mexico	
8	Win	8–0	Candelario Morales	KO	2	5 Feb 1994	Mérida, Yucatán, Mexico	
7	Win	7–0	Manuel Carballo	KO	6	20 Nov 1993	Mérida, Yucatán, Mexico	
6	Win	6–0	Martín Palomo	KO	1	16 Oct 1993	Mérida, Yucatán, Mexico	
5	Win	5–0	Víctor Cauich	KO	1	18 Sep 1993	Mérida, Yucatán, Mexico	
4	Win	4–0	Roberto Bellos	TKO	2	28 Apr 1993	Mérida, Yucatán, Mexico	
3	Win	3–0	Santiago Martín	TKO	2	20 Mar 1993	Mérida, Yucatán, Mexico	
2	Win	2–0	José Marín	KO	2	27 Nov 1992	Mérida, Yucatán, Mexico	
1	Win	1–0	Manuel Pérez	UD	4	8 Oct 1992	Arena Deportivo San Juan, Mérida, Mexico	

== Personal life ==
Espadas's father, Guty Espadas, was the WBA Flyweight Champion during the 1970s.

Preceded by Naseem Hamed; Vacated	WBC Featherweight Champion; 14 Apr 2000 – 17 Feb 2001	Succeeded by Erik Morales

== See also ==
- Notable boxing families
- List of WBC world champions
- List of featherweight boxing champions
- List of Mexican boxing world champions
