= Félix Márquez =

Venezuelan boxer

Personal information
- Born: 20 November 1947 (age 78) Cumaná, Venezuela

Sport
- Sport: Boxing

Félix Márquez (born 20 November 1947) is a Venezuelan boxer. He competed in the men's flyweight event at the 1968 Summer Olympics.

== Professional boxing career ==
Marquez had a mostly undistinguished professional boxing career which included a record of 6 wins, 6 losses and 1 draw (tie) in 13 bouts, with 5 knockout wins and 3 knockout losses. His wins, however, included a sixth-round knockout victory over future three time world champion Betulio Gonzalez on 6 March 1970 and his losses included a 12 rounds split decision defeat to that same fighter for the Venezuelan national flyweight title in a rematch, held on 5 June of the same year.
