= Freddy Castillo =

Mexican boxer

Personal information
- Nickname: Chato Loco
- Born: Freddy Castillo; June 15, 1955 (age 71) Mérida, Yucatán, Mexico
- Height: 5 ft 3 in (160 cm)
- Weight: Light flyweight Flyweight

Boxing career
- Stance: Southpaw

Boxing record
- Total fights: 68
- Wins: 45
- Win by KO: 30
- Losses: 18
- Draws: 5

Freddy Castillo (born June 15, 1955) is a Mexican former professional boxer who competed from 1971 to 1985. He is a world champion in two weight classes, having held the World Boxing Council (WBC) light-flyweight title in 1978, and the WBC and Ring magazine flyweight titles in 1982.

== Pro career ==
Known as "Chato Loco", Castillo turned pro in 1971 and won the WBC light flyweight title with a TKO win over Luis Estaba in 1978. He lost the belt in his first defense later that year to Netrnoi Sor Vorasingh by split decision. He later moved up in weight and in 1982 won the WBC and The Ring flyweight titles with a decision win over Prudencio Cardona. He lost the titles in his first defense to Eleoncio Mercedes by split decision. He retired in 1986 after losing to Sot Chitalada for the WBC flyweight title in Kuwait City, Kuwait. He also lost to Panamanians Alfonso Lopez and Hilario Zapata

== Professional boxing record ==
68 fights	45 wins	18 losses
By knockout	30	5
By decision	14	12
By disqualification	1	1
Draws	5	

No.	Result	Record	Opponent	Type	Round, time	Date	Age	Location	Notes
68	Loss	45–18–5	Sot Chitalada	UD	12	Feb 22, 1986	29 years, 252 days	El Saba Al Salem Stadium, Kuwait City, Kuwait	For WBC and The Ring flyweight titles
67	Loss	45–17–5	Antonio Avelar	TKO	4 (10)	Sep 23, 1984	29 years, 100 days	Plaza de Toros El Toreo, Tijuana, Baja California, Mexico	
66	Win	45–16–5	Carlos de la Paz	KO	3 (?)	May 18, 1984	28 years, 338 days	Cancun, Quintana Roo, Mexico	
65	Win	44–16–5	Artemio Ruiz	KO	5 (?)	Oct 27, 1984	29 years, 134 days	Merida, Yucatán, Mexico	
64	Win	43–16–5	Arturo Tebaqui	TKO	6 (?)	Apr 7, 1984	28 years, 297 days	Merida, Yucatán, Mexico	
63	Win	42–16–5	Jose Luis Cruz	TKO	1 (?)	Feb 11, 1984	28 years, 241 days	Merida, Yucatán, Mexico	
62	Win	41–16–5	Arturo Mujica	TKO	6 (?)	Nov 26, 1983	28 years, 164 days	Merida, Yucatán, Mexico	
61	Loss	40–16–5	Luis Fernando Hernandez	TKO	3 (?)	Aug 15, 1983	28 years, 64 days	Tijuana, Baja California, Mexico	
60	Draw	40–15–5	Candido Tellez	PTS	10	May 28, 1983	27 years, 347 days	Tijuana, Baja California, Mexico	
59	Loss	40–15–4	Eleoncio Mercedes	SD	15	Nov 6, 1982	27 years, 144 days	Olympic Auditorium, Los Angeles, California, U.S.	Lost WBC and The Ring flyweight titles
58	Win	40–14–4	Prudencio Cardona	UD	15	Jul 24, 1982	27 years, 39 days	Carte Clara Baseball Park, Merida, Yucatán, Mexico	Won WBC and The Ring flyweight titles
57	Win	39–14–4	Lupe Acosta	PTS	12	Feb 26, 1982	26 years, 256 days	Culiacan, Sinaloa, Mexico	Retained NABF flyweight title
56	Win	38–14–4	Javier Lucas	PTS	10	Sep 26, 1981	26 years, 103 days	Carte Clara Baseball Park, Merida, Yucatán, Mexico	
55	Win	37–14–4	Gabriel Bernal	TKO	8 (12)	Aug 22, 1981	26 years, 68 days	Villahermosa, Tabasco, Mexico	Won vacant NABF flyweight title
54	Win	36–14–4	Jorge de Jesus	TKO	4 (10)	Jul 17, 1981	26 years, 32 days	Villahermosa, Tabasco, Mexico	
53	Win	35–14–4	Nestor Obregon	TKO	6 (?)	May 15, 1981	25 years, 334 days	Villahermosa, Tabasco, Mexico	
52	Win	34–14–4	Javier Lucas	PTS	10	Apr 24, 1981	25 years, 313 days	Acapulco, Guerrero, Mexico	
51	Loss	33–14–4	Jose Gallegos	PTS	12	Mar 30, 1981	25 years, 288 days	Reynosa, Tamaulipas, Mexico	For Mexico flyweight title
50	Win	33–13–4	Gabriel Bernal	PTS	10	Jan 30, 1981	25 years, 229 days	Villahermosa, Tabasco, Mexico	
49	Win	32–13–4	Alfredo Hernandez	PTS	10	Dec 20, 1980	25 years, 188 days	Merida, Yucatán, Mexico	
48	Loss	31–13–4	Amado Ursua	TKO	3 (?)	Oct 25, 1980	25 years, 132 days	Mexico City, Distrito Federal, Mexico	
47	Win	31–12–4	Samuel Machorro	TKO	6 (?)	Sep 6, 1980	25 years, 83 days	Mexico City, Distrito Federal, Mexico	
46	Loss	30–12–4	Alfonso Lopez	PTS	10	Apr 26, 1980	24 years, 316 days	Merida, Yucatán, Mexico	
45	Win	30–11–4	Elid Fernandez	KO	4 (?)	Feb 10, 1980	24 years, 240 days	Plaza de Toros San Roque, Tuxtla Gutierrez, Chiapas, Mexico	
44	Win	29–11–4	Ramon Balbino Soria	TKO	6 (10)	Nov 10, 1979	24 years, 148 days	Estadio Luna Park, Buenos Aires, Distrito Federal, Argentina	
43	Draw	28–11–4	Rodolfo Rodriguez	PTS	10	Oct 27, 1979	24 years, 134 days	Estadio Luna Park, Buenos Aires, Distrito Federal, Argentina	
42	Loss	28–11–3	Jose Gallegos	PTS	12	Sep 17, 1979	24 years, 94 days	Monterrey, Nuevo León, Mexico	For vacant Mexico flyweight title
41	Loss	28–10–3	Hilario Zapata	UD	12	Jun 23, 1979	24 years, 8 days	Gimnasio Nuevo Panama, Panama City, Panama	
40	Loss	28–9–3	Jose Gallegos	PTS	10	Mar 5, 1979	23 years, 263 days	Houston, Texas, U.S.	
39	Win	28–8–3	Antonio Avelar	TKO	10 (10)	Oct 21, 1978	23 years, 128 days	Merida, Yucatán, Mexico	
38	Win	27–8–3	Juan Alvarez	TKO	10 (?)	Jul 29, 1978	23 years, 44 days	Merida, Yucatán, Mexico	
37	Loss	26–8–3	Netrnoi Sor Vorasingh	SD	15	May 6, 1978	22 years, 325 days	Bangkok, Thailand	Lost WBC light flyweight title
36	Win	26–7–3	Luis Estaba	TKO	14 (15), 2:30	Feb 19, 1978	22 years, 249 days	Nuevo Circo, Caracas, Venezuela	Won WBC light flyweight title
35	Win	25–7–3	Wilberth Canche	TKO	3 (?)	Sep 17, 1977	22 years, 94 days	Parque Carta Clara, Merida, Yucatán, Mexico	
34	Win	24–7–3	Aureliano Sanchez	KO	3 (?)	Aug 14, 1977	22 years, 60 days	Tenosique, Tabasco, Mexico	
33	Win	23–7–3	Pedro Flores	DQ	8 (?)	Jul 6, 1977	22 years, 21 days	Merida, Yucatán, Mexico	
32	Win	22–7–3	Adelaido Galindo	TKO	8 (?)	Apr 30, 1977	21 years, 319 days	Parque Carta Clara, Merida, Yucatán, Mexico	
31	Win	21–7–3	Juan Jose Guzman	PTS	10	Mar 25, 1977	21 years, 283 days	Arena Coliseo, Guadalajara, Jalisco, Mexico	Not to be confused with Juan Guzman
30	Win	20–7–3	Antonio Avelar	PTS	10	Feb 4, 1977	21 years, 234 days	Arena Coliseo, Guadalajara, Jalisco, Mexico	
29	Win	19–7–3	Freddy Polanco	KO	1 (?)	Jan 15, 1977	21 years, 214 days	Acapulco, Guerrero, Mexico	
28	Win	18–7–3	Arturo Delgado	PTS	10	Sep 14, 1976	21 years, 91 days	Cancun, Quintana Roo, Mexico	
27	Loss	17–7–3	Freddy Hernandez	TKO	5 (?)	Feb 4, 1976	20 years, 234 days	Plaza de Toros, Merida, Yucatán, Mexico	
26	Win	17–6–3	Juan Zarate	TKO	2 (?)	Aug 6, 1975	20 years, 52 days	Merida, Yucatán, Mexico	
25	Win	16–6–3	Frankie Granados	KO	3 (?)	Jul 7, 1975	20 years, 22 days	Merida, Yucatán, Mexico	
24	Win	15–6–3	Rocky Thompson	KO	1 (?)	May 7, 1975	19 years, 326 days	Merida, Yucatán, Mexico	
23	Loss	14–6–3	Juan Diaz	DQ	4 (?)	Jan 9, 1975	19 years, 208 days	Merida, Yucatán, Mexico	
22	Win	14–5–3	Jose Curiel	TKO	3 (?)	Oct 5, 1974	19 years, 112 days	Merida, Yucatán, Mexico	
21	Win	13–5–3	Rancherito Hernandez	KO	3 (?)	Sep 7, 1974	19 years, 84 days	Merida, Yucatán, Mexico	
20	Win	12–5–3	Jose Mendoza	KO	7 (?)	Aug 23, 1974	19 years, 69 days	Valladolid, Yucatán, Mexico	
19	Win	11–5–3	Chucho Loria	KO	7 (?)	Jul 20, 1974	19 years, 35 days	Valladolid, Yucatán, Mexico	
18	Loss	10–5–3	Luis Enrique Garcia	PTS	10	Mar 23, 1974	18 years, 281 days	Merida, Yucatán, Mexico	
17	Win	10–4–3	Gonzalo Gonzalez	PTS	8	Sep 8, 1973	18 years, 85 days	Merida, Yucatán, Mexico	
16	Loss	9–4–3	Evelio Munoz	PTS	8	Aug 19, 1973	18 years, 65 days	Merida, Yucatán, Mexico	
15	Win	9–3–3	Kid Valente	PTS	8	Jul 8, 1973	18 years, 23 days	Merida, Yucatán, Mexico	
14	Loss	8–3–3	Chucho Loria	PTS	8	Jun 22, 1973	18 years, 7 days	Merida, Yucatán, Mexico	
13	Win	8–2–3	Baby Gil	KO	2 (?)	May 21, 1973	17 years, 340 days	Merida, Yucatán, Mexico	
12	Win	7–2–3	Kid Copetes	KO	4 (?)	Apr 25, 1973	17 years, 314 days	Merida, Yucatán, Mexico	
11	Draw	6–2–3	Chucho Loria	PTS	6	Mar 8, 1973	17 years, 266 days	Progreso, Yucatán, Mexico	
10	Win	6–2–2	Lupe Madera	PTS	6	Oct 5, 1972	17 years, 112 days	Merida, Yucatán, Mexico	
9	Draw	5–2–2	Chucho Loria	PTS	6	Aug 23, 1972	17 years, 69 days	Merida, Yucatán, Mexico	
8	Win	5–2–1	Gonzalo Gonzalez	PTS	6	Jun 2, 1972	16 years, 353 days	Progreso, Yucatán, Mexico	
7	Draw	4–2–1	Irving Cetina	PTS	6	May 3, 1972	16 years, 323 days	Merida, Yucatán, Mexico	
6	Win	4–2	Miguel Camargo	KO	4 (?)	Jan 28, 1972	16 years, 227 days	Chetumal, Quintana Roo, Mexico	
5	Loss	3–2	Romulo Cortes	PTS	4	Jan 12, 1972	16 years, 211 days	Merida, Yucatán, Mexico	
4	Win	3–1	Magallo Lozada	PTS	4	Dec 1, 1971	16 years, 169 days	Merida, Yucatán, Mexico	
3	Win	2–1	Agustin Cruz	KO	1 (?)	Nov 8, 1971	16 years, 146 days	Tenosique, Tabasco, Mexico	
2	Win	1–1	Ranulfo Cano	KO	4 (?)	Oct 20, 1971	16 years, 127 days	Merida, Yucatán, Mexico	
1	Loss	0–1	Guty Espadas	KO	4 (?)	Sep 22, 1971	16 years, 99 days	Merida, Yucatán, Mexico	

== Titles in boxing ==
=== Major world titles ===
- WBC light flyweight champion (108 lbs)
- WBC flyweight champion (112 lbs)

=== The Ring magazine titles ===
- The Ring flyweight champion (112 lbs)

=== Regional/International titles ===
- NABF flyweight champion (112 lbs)

== See also ==
- List of flyweight boxing champions
- List of light flyweight boxing champions
- List of WBC world champions
- List of Mexican boxing world champions

Sporting positions
World boxing titles
Preceded by Luis Estaba	WBC light flyweight champion February 19 – May 6, 1978	Succeeded by Netrnoi Sor Vorasingh
Preceded by Prudencio Cardona	WBC flyweight champion July 24 – November 6, 1982	Succeeded by Eleoncio Mercedes
Preceded by Prudencio Cardona	The Ring flyweight champion July 24 – November 6, 1982	Succeeded by Eleoncio Mercedes
