= Chon Romero =

Panamanian sportsreporter (born c.1940)

- Born: c. 1940; Panama
- Occupations: Sportswriter, sportscaster, author
- Known for: Spanish-language commentator on HBO Latino boxing broadcasts
- Notable work: Roberto Durán y Julio César Chávez: Los Dos Mejores Púgiles Latinos del Milenio ¿Quién Fue El Mejor Boxeador?

Chon Romero (born c. 1940) is a Panamanian sportswriter and sportscaster. He was one of two sportscasters on HBO Latino, commenting on HBO Boxing telecasts.

Romero does not speak English; he worked on the network's Spanish telecasts of major boxing events, which were carried live, concurrent with their English telecasts on HBO.

Romero is also a blogger and book writer, his comments being published on Soloboxeo.com and Latinoboxing.com.

In 2001, Romero wrote a book named Roberto Durán y Julio César Chávez: Los Dos Mejores Pugiles Latinos del Milenio Quien Fue El Mejor Boxeador?. in this book, he discussed his opinion about who was better between Roberto Durán, a Panamanian multiple time world champion, and Julio César Chávez, a Mexican multiple time world champion. He also credited Wilfredo Gómez, Félix Trinidad, Wilfred Benítez, Carlos Monzon and Ricardo López as being other great Latino fighters in this book.

For many years, Romero published a boxing magazine from New York, New York, named Guantes. This magazine was published from Brooklyn and reached various states where there are large Hispanic populations as well as Hispanic countries in North America, Central and South America and the Caribbean.
