= Miguel Mercedes =

Dominican boxer

Personal information
- Nationality: Dominican Republic
- Weight: Flyweight; Super-flyweight
- Relative: Eleoncio Mercedes (brother)

Boxing career

Boxing record
- Total fights: 21
- Wins: 14
- Win by KO: 10
- Losses: 7
- Draws: 0
- No contests: 0

Miguel Mercedes is a Dominican former professional boxer who competed from 1983 to 1994, challenging for the WBO flyweight title in 1989, but lost to Elvis Álvarez.

Mercedes was born in the Dominican Republic. He was the brother of Eleoncio Mercedes, an Olympic boxer.
