= Venice Borkhorsor =

Thai boxer

Personal information
- Nickname: The Nakhon ghost
- Born: Prawet Ponchiengkwang (ประเวศ พลเชียงขวาง); April 6, 1950 (age 76) Tha Uthen, Nakhon Phanom, Thailand
- Height: 5 ft 4 in (163 cm)
- Weight: Flyweight; Bantamweight

Boxing career
- Stance: Southpaw

Boxing record
- Total fights: 57
- Wins: 49
- Win by KO: 36
- Losses: 8

Venice Borkhorsor (born April 6, 1950 in Nakhon Phanom) is a boxer from Thailand.

== Boxing career ==
Borkhorsor was a warrior with a strong punch. He won 49 of 57 bouts and scored 36 knockouts. During his career, he won the WBC Flyweight Championship of the World, his first and most prestigious title, the OPBF Bantamweight Championship, the Bantamweight Championship of Thailand and the Flyweight Championship of Thailand.

He was managed by Chana Supkaew, under whom he maintained a record with few losses.

Borkhorsor started his more competitive boxing career in Bangkok around May 1968, in his first year obtaining seven knockouts in his first nine fights. In his first five years of fighting, he lost only one of his more competitive matches.

His single loss in his early career was against Patjai Srijantopas in his first attempt at the Thai flyweight title. He lost the ten round bout on points in Bangkok on May 31, 1969, only one year into his career fighting in Bangkok.

In his second attempt, Borkhorser won the Thai flyweight title in July 1970, at the age of 21 by defeating Ratanasak Vayupak in a ninth round TKO on July 17, 1970 in Bangkok, Thailand.

He obtained the WBC World Flyweight Title on September 29, 1972 by defeating Betulio González in Bangkok, Thailand in a tenth round TKO and later defeating the Lineal Flyweight Champion Erbito Salavarria. He vacated the title following his last fight against Julio Guerrero on July 10, 1973.

Borkhorsor attempted unsuccessfully to take the World Bantamweight Title on October 13, 1973 from Rafael Herrera, losing in a fifteen round split decision on October 15, 1973.

== Later career and retirement from boxing ==
He held the OPBF Bantamweight title on February 11, 1975, when he defeated Bok-soo Hwang in a ninth round knockout in Bangkok.

He took the Thai Bantamweight title on July 27, 1979 from Duanesan Lukklongjan in a seventh round knockout in Bangkok, Thailand.

His single loss by knockout in the fourth round against Detkat Kiatboonyong, holder of the Thai Bantamweight title, on January 22, 1980 may have precipitated his retirement. He retired with an exceptional record from more competitive boxing in August 1980, at the age of only thirty.

In his career, he had an astounding .63 knockout percentage, a figure that was even higher in his first year of competition. His dominance and quick rise to fame may have been partially explained by his southpaw stance.

== Professional boxing record ==
57 fights	49 wins	8 losses
By knockout	36	1
By decision	13	7

No.	Result	Record	Opponent	Type	Round, time	Date	Location	Notes
57	Win	49–8	Suriya Patumwadee	KO	6 (10)	Aug 11, 1980	Bangkok, Thailand	
56	Loss	48–8	Detkat Kiatboonyong	KO	4 (?)	Jan 22, 1980	Bangkok, Thailand	
55	Loss	48–7	Neptali Alamag	UD	10	Dec 7, 1979	Rizal Memorial Coliseum, Manila, Philippines	
54	Win	48–6	Sang Bong Lee	KO	6 (10)	Oct 21, 1979	Munhwa Gymnasium, Seoul, South Korea	
53	Win	47–6	Duanesan Lukklongjan	KO	7 (10)	Jul 27, 1979	Bangkok, Thailand	Won vacant Thai bantamweight title
52	Win	46–6	Tony Tris	PTS	10	Mar 25, 1979	Caracas, Venezuela	
51	Win	45–6	Freddy Perez Acosta	KO	7 (10)	Feb 7, 1979	Caracas, Venezuela	
50	Loss	44–6	Paul Ferreri	UD	10	May 11, 1978	Melbourne Town Hall, Melbourne, Australia	
49	Win	44–5	Eduardo Abrogar	KO	6 (?)	Jun 22, 1977	Bangkok, Thailand	
48	Win	43–5	Yung Shik Kim	PTS	10	Oct 12, 1976	Bangkok, Thailand	
47	Loss	42–5	Hong Soo-hwan	PTS	12	May 30, 1976	Busan, South Korea	Lost OPBF bantamweight title
46	Loss	42–4	Rodolfo Martínez	SD	15	Jan 30, 1976	Hua Mark Indoor Stadium, Bangkok, Thailand	For WBC bantamweight title
45	Win	42–3	Koo Doung Kim	KO	5 (?)	Nov 28, 1975	Bangkok, Thailand	
44	Win	41–3	Saeng Keun Koh	PTS	10	Sep 21, 1975	Jangchung Gymnasium, Seoul, South Korea	
43	Win	40–3	Sutan Rambing	KO	3 (?)	Jul 25, 1975	Bangkok, Thailand	
42	Win	39–3	Bok Soo Hwang	KO	9 (12)	Feb 11, 1975	Bangkok, Thailand	Retained OPBF bantamweight title
41	Win	38–3	Conrado Vasquez	UD	12	Nov 22, 1974	Lumpinee Boxing Stadium, Bangkok, Thailand	Won vacant OPBF bantamweight title
40	Win	37–3	Saul Montana	PTS	10	Sep 17, 1974	Lumpinee Boxing Stadium, Bangkok, Thailand	
39	Win	36–3	Al Diaz	KO	4 (?)	Jul 6, 1974	Bangkok, Thailand	
38	Win	35–3	Joe Gumede	TKO	10 (10)	Mar 23, 1974	Arena Coliseo, Mexico City, Mexico	
37	Loss	34–3	Saul Montana	PTS	10	Feb 23, 1974	Arena Coliseo, Monterrey, Mexico	
36	Loss	34–2	Rafael Herrera	SD	15	Oct 13, 1973	The Forum, Inglewood, California, U.S.	For WBC bantamweight title
35	Win	34–1	Julio Guerrero	KO	6 (10)	Jul 10, 1973	Plaza de Toros El Toreo, Tijuana, Mexico	
34	Win	33–1	Erbito Salavarria	UD	15	Feb 9, 1973	Kittikachorn Stadium, Bangkok, Thailand	Retained WBC flyweight title; Won The Ring flyweight title
33	Win	32–1	Ben Salah Abdesselem	KO	2 (10)	Dec 15, 1972	Bangkok, Thailand	
32	Win	31–1	Betulio González	TKO	10 (15), 2:10	Sep 29, 1972	Kittikachorn Stadium, Bangkok, Thailand	Won WBC flyweight title
31	Win	30–1	Chit Wiseera	KO	5 (?)	Aug 4, 1972	Bangkok, Thailand	
30	Win	29–1	San Sacristan	KO	7 (?)	Jun 9, 1972	Bangkok, Thailand	
29	Win	28–1	Fernando Cabanela	PTS	10	Feb 15, 1972	Kittikachorn Stadium, Bangkok, Thailand	
28	Win	27–1	Snappy Asano	PTS	10	Dec 17, 1971	Bangkok, Thailand	
27	Win	26–1	Johnny Agbon	KO	8 (10)	Oct 19, 1971	Bangkok, Thailand	
26	Win	25–1	Chong Ho Moon	KO	6 (?)	Sep 14, 1971	Lumpinee Boxing Stadium, Bangkok, Thailand	
25	Win	24–1	Johnny Agbon	UD	10	Jul 9, 1971	Bangkok, Thailand	
24	Win	23–1	Rudy Billones	KO	8 (?)	Jun 4, 1971	Bangkok, Thailand	
23	Win	22–1	Dong Ki Cho	KO	8 (?)	Apr 2, 1971	Bangkok, Thailand	
22	Win	21–1	Shigeru Taremizu	KO	1 (10)	Mar 2, 1971	Bangkok, Thailand	
21	Win	20–1	Meonfan Rorsorpor	KO	3 (?)	Dec 30, 1970	Ayutthaya, Thailand	
20	Win	19–1	Harry Hayes	TKO	2 (10)	Dec 1, 1970	Lumpinee Boxing Stadium, Bangkok, Thailand	
19	Win	18–1	Catalino Flores	KO	4 (?)	Oct 16, 1970	Bangkok, Thailand	
18	Win	17–1	Carlos Rebanacos	KO	6 (?)	Aug 23, 1970	Bangkok, Thailand	
17	Win	16–1	Ratanasak Vayupak	KO	9 (10)	Jul 17, 1970	Bangkok, Thailand	Won vacant Thai flyweight title
16	Win	15–1	Wittaya Pleonjit	KO	3 (?)	Apr 6, 1970	Bangkok, Thailand	
15	Win	14–1	Lekpetch Luknakornchaisri	KO	7 (?)	Mar 4, 1970	Ratchaburi, Thailand	
14	Win	13–1	Wittayanoi Singhyodfah	KO	2 (?)	Jan 17, 1970	Bangkok, Thailand	
13	Win	12–1	Sak Saklaemthong	KO	6 (8)	Dec 18, 1969	Rajadamnern Stadium, Bangkok, Thailand	
12	Win	11–1	Somrerk Rorsorpor	PTS	8	Sep 26, 1969	Bangkok, Thailand	
11	Win	10–1	Chaythong Singchiopleong	PTS	8	Jul 27, 1969	Bangkok, Thailand	
10	Loss	9–1	Patjai Srijantopas	PTS	10	May 31, 1969	Bangkok, Thailand	For vacant Thai flyweight title
9	Win	9–0	Voravit S Pichitchai	KO	3 (?)	Mar 1, 1969	Bangkok, Thailand	
8	Win	8–0	Sornthong Singkhonkaen	KO	3 (?)	Feb 8, 1969	Bangkok, Thailand	
7	Win	7–0	Lekpetch Luknakornchaisri	KO	2 (?)	Jan 4, 1969	Bangkok, Thailand	
6	Win	6–0	Adnoi Singprasert	KO	2 (?)	Nov 23, 1968	Bangkok, Thailand	
5	Win	5–0	Sak Saklaemthong	PTS	8	Oct 12, 1968	Bangkok, Thailand	
4	Win	4–0	Tinkajorn Dejkajorn	PTS	6	Jul 27, 1968	Bangkok, Thailand	
3	Win	3–0	Sampan Singbanbung	KO	5 (?)	Jul 6, 1968	Bangkok, Thailand	
2	Win	2–0	Krongsak Muangrayong	KO	2 (?)	Jun 1, 1968	Bangkok, Thailand	
1	Win	1–0	Chan Chanasak	KO	2 (6)	May 5, 1968	Bangkok, Thailand	

== See also ==
- List of southpaw stance boxers
- Lineal championship
- List of world flyweight boxing champions

Sporting positions
Regional boxing titles
Vacant Title last held by Patjai Srijantopas	Thai flyweight champion July 17, 1970 – 1971; Vacated	Vacant Title next held by Wittaya Pleonjit
Vacant Title last held by Hong Soo-hwan	OPBF bantamweight champion November 22, 1974 – May 30, 1976	Succeeded by Hong Soo-hwan
Vacant Title last held by Somkiat Sukhothai	Thai bantamweight champion July 27, 1979 – 1980; Vacated	Vacant Title next held by Prabtoranee Luklampakchee
World boxing titles
Preceded by Betulio González	WBC flyweight champion September 29, 1972 – July 10, 1973; Vacated	Vacant Title next held by Betulio González
Preceded by Erbito Salavarria	The Ring flyweight champion February 9, 1973 – July 10, 1973; Vacated	Vacant Title next held by Miguel Canto
