= Gabriel Bernal =

Mexican boxer

Personal information
- Born: March 24, 1956 (age 70) Cruz Grande, Mexico
- Died: 14 June 2014 (aged 58)
- Height: 5 ft 2 1/2 in (159 cm)
- Weight: Flyweight

Boxing career
- Reach: 68 in (173 cm)
- Stance: Southpaw

Boxing record
- Total fights: 60
- Wins: 43
- Win by KO: 28
- Losses: 14
- Draws: 3

Gabriel Bernal (24 March 1956 - June 12, 2014) was a Mexican professional boxer. He was the WBC and Lineal Flyweight Champion for six months in 1984 and a super champion in the ring in the 1970s.

== Pro career ==
Bernal came from Cruz Grande, Mexico. He was a top-ten Flyweight contender when he went to Tokyo to face the hometown favorite Koji Kobayashi for the WBC, The Ring and Lineal Flyweight Championships. Bernal would defeat Kobayashi by second-round knockout. Two months later, Bernal successfully defended his titles in Nîmes, France, defeating Antoine Montero by an eleventh-round knockout. This was significant because the previous six WBC Flyweight Champions had all lost their title in their first defence.

Bernal is remembered for his series of fights with Thailand's Sot Chitalada. For Bernal's second defense, he went to Bangkok to face Chitalada. He lost a twelve-round decision on 8 October 1984. Eight months later, Bernal travelled back to Bangkok in an attempt to wrest the title from Chitalada. On 22 June 1985, Bernal fought Chitalada to a draw after twelve rounds, and Chitalada kept the title. Bernal had one more shot eighteen months later, travelling again to Bangkok, where on 10 December 1986 he lost another twelve-round decision to Chitalada. It was his final attempt to win the Flyweight title.

Bernal fought for another six years, but was never the same fighter. On 11 April 1992 he lost a 12-round decision to former WBC Bantamweight Champion, Miguel Lora. He fought once more before retiring, finishing his career with a record of 43-14-3 and 28 KOs.

== Professional boxing record ==
60 fights	43 wins	14 losses
By knockout	28	4
By decision	15	10
Draws	3	

No.	Result	Record	Opponent	Type	Round, time	Date	Location	Notes
60	Loss	43–14–3	Miguel Lora	PTS	10	12 Apr 1992	Bogotá, Colombia	
59	Win	43–13–3	Gabriel Ocampo	KO	2	18 Oct 1991	Mexico	
58	Loss	42–13–3	Armando Castro	TKO	5 (12)	5 Sep 1990	Mexico City, Distrito Federal, Mexico	For vacant Mexican super-flyweight title
57	Loss	42–12–3	Armando Salazar	SD	12	12 May 1990	Mexico City, Distrito Federal, Mexico	For Mexican super-flyweight title
56	Win	42–11–3	Francisco González	KO	5	16 Feb 1990	Acapulco, Guerrero, Mexico	
55	Win	41–11–3	Francisco Rosas	PTS	10	15 Dec 1989	Villahermosa, Tabasco, Mexico	
54	Loss	40–11–3	Ramón Arreola	UD	10	30 Sep 1988	Mazatlán, Sinaloa, Mexico	
53	Loss	40–10–3	Sot Chitalada	UD	12	10 Dec 1986	Hua Mark Indoor Stadium, Bangkok, Thailand	For WBC and The Ring flyweight titles
52	Win	40–9–3	Jorge de Jesús	KO	2 (10)	1 May 1986	Auditorio Municipal, Torreón, Mexico	
51	Win	39–9–3	Ray Medel	PTS	10	12 Dec 1985	Sam Houston Coliseum, Houston, Texas, U.S.	
50	Draw	38–9–3	Sot Chitalada	MD	12	22 Jun 1985	National Stadium Gymnasium, Bangkok, Thailand	For WBC and The Ring flyweight titles
49	Loss	38–9–2	Sot Chitalada	SD	12	8 Oct 1984	National Stadium Gymnasium, Bangkok, Thailand	Lost WBC and The Ring flyweight titles
48	Win	38–8–2	Antoine Montero	TKO	11 (12)	1 Jun 1984	Arènes de Nîmes, Nîmes, France	Retained WBC and The Ring flyweight titles
47	Win	37–8–2	Kōji Kobayashi	KO	2 (12), 2:37	9 Apr 1984	Korakuen Hall, Tokyo, Japan	Won WBC and The Ring flyweight titles
46	Win	36–8–2	Ernesto Guevara	TKO	2 (10)	27 Jan 1984	Auditorio Municipal, Torreón, Mexico	
45	Win	35–8–2	Enrique Castro	TKO	2 (10)	19 Oct 1983	Showboat Hotel and Casino, Las Vegas, Nevada, U.S.	
44	Win	34–8–2	Jose Torres	SD	10	20 Apr 1983	Civic Auditorium, San Jose, California, U.S.	
43	Win	33–8–2	Homero Guel	KO	3	5 Feb 1983	Ciudad Victoria, Tamaulipas, Mexico	
42	Win	32–8–2	Pascual Polanco	KO	3 (10), 0:43	16 Nov 1982	Sam Houston Coliseum, Houston, Texas, U.S.	
41	Win	31–8–2	Javier Lucas	KO	5, 0:47	14 Aug 1982	Arena Coliseo, Mexico City, Mexico	
40	Win	30–8–2	Alfredo Hernández	PTS	10	2 Apr 1982	Gimnasio Municipal, Torreón, Mexico	
39	Win	29–8–2	Arturo Tebaqui	KO	3	20 Mar 1982	Mexico City, Distrito Federal, Mexico	
38	Win	28–8–2	Lupe Acosta	PTS	10	22 Nov 1981	Los Mochis, Sinaloa, Mexico	
37	Loss	27–8–2	Freddy Castillo	TKO	8 (12)	22 Aug 1981	Villahermosa, Tabasco, Mexico	For vacant NABF flyweight title
36	Loss	27–7–2	Miguel Canto	PTS	10	6 Jun 1981	Mérida, Yucatán, Mexico	
35	Win	27–6–2	Miguel Canto	PTS	10	21 Mar 1981	Villahermosa, Tabasco, Mexico	
34	Loss	26–6–2	Freddy Castillo	PTS	10	30 Jan 1981	Villahermosa, Tabasco, Mexico	
33	Draw	26–5–2	Luis Aguilar	PTS	10	13 Dec 1980	Tuxtla Gutiérrez, Chiapas, Mexico	
32	Win	26–5–1	Armando Pérez	KO	5	29 Feb 1980	Acapulco, Guerrero, Mexico	
31	Win	25–5–1	Armando Pérez	TKO	1	1 Sep 1979	Mexico City, Distrito Federal, Mexico	
30	Win	24–5–1	José Sosa	TKO	9	14 Jul 1979	Mexico City, Distrito Federal, Mexico	
29	Win	23–5–1	Juan Álvarez	UD	10	31 Mar 1979	Plaza de Toros Calafia, Mexicali, Mexico	
28	Win	22–5–1	Raúl Pérez	KO	2	8 Dec 1978	Coatzacoalcos, Veracruz, Mexico	
27	Win	21–5–1	José Gallegos	PTS	10	12 Aug 1978	Mexico City, Distrito Federal, Mexico	
26	Loss	20–5–1	Valentín Martínez	PTS	12	21 Jan 1978	Mexico City, Distrito Federal, Mexico	For Mexican flyweight title
25	Win	20–4–1	Santiago Pérez	PTS	10	8 Dec 1977	Coatzacoalcos, Veracruz, Mexico	
24	Win	19–4–1	Raúl Valdez	PTS	10	12 Nov 1977	Mexico City, Distrito Federal, Mexico	
23	Draw	18–4–1	Raúl Valdez	PTS	10	10 Sep 1977	Mexico City, Distrito Federal, Mexico	
22	Win	18–4	Rafael Gandarilla	TKO	2	2 Jul 1977	Mexico City, Distrito Federal, Mexico	
21	Win	17–4	Antonio Avelar	PTS	10	21 May 1977	Arena Coliseo, Mexico City, Mexico	
20	Loss	16–4	Raúl Valdez	PTS	10	15 Dec 1976	Mexico City, Distrito Federal, Mexico	
19	Win	16–3	Ángel Félix	KO	9	15 Oct 1976	Mexico City, Distrito Federal, Mexico	
18	Win	15–3	José Gallegos	PTS	10	8 Oct 1976	Mexico City, Distrito Federal, Mexico	
17	Win	14–3	Abundio Cortes	KO	7 (10)	25 Aug 1976	Mérida, Yucatán, Mexico	
16	Win	13–3	Frankie Granados	TKO	2	9 Jun 1976	Mexico City, Distrito Federal, Mexico	
15	Win	12–3	Sergio Martínez	TKO	5	1 May 1976	Mexico City, Distrito Federal, Mexico	
14	Loss	11–3	Arturo Delgado	TKO	6	28 Feb 1976	Mexico City, Distrito Federal, Mexico	
13	Win	11–2	Víctor Presa	KO	2	4 Feb 1976	Mexico City, Distrito Federal, Mexico	
12	Win	10–2	Rodolfo López	TKO	7	17 Jan 1976	Mexico City, Distrito Federal, Mexico	
11	Win	9–2	Mario Espitia	KO	6	7 Dec 1975	Mexico City, Distrito Federal, Mexico	
10	Win	8–2	Santiago Pérez	TKO	1	5 Nov 1975	Mexico City, Distrito Federal, Mexico	
9	Win	7–2	Juan Díaz	PTS	10	17 Sep 1975	Mexico City, Distrito Federal, Mexico	
8	Loss	6–2	Frankie Granados	TKO	10	28 May 1975	Mexico City, Distrito Federal, Mexico	
7	Win	6–1	Juan Granados	KO	6	26 Apr 1975	Mexico City, Distrito Federal, Mexico	
6	Win	5–1	Enrique Valdez	PTS	6	4 Dec 1974	Mexico City, Distrito Federal, Mexico	
5	Win	4–1	Joel Gatica	KO	2	15 Nov 1974	Zihuatanejo, Guerrero, Mexico	
4	Win	3–1	Arturo Patiño	TKO	6	12 Oct 1974	Arena Coliseo, Mexico City, Mexico	
3	Win	2–1	Juan Valencia	PTS	6	15 May 1974	Mexico City, Distrito Federal, Mexico	
2	Loss	1–1	Sergio Martínez	PTS	6	30 Mar 1974	Mexico City, Distrito Federal, Mexico	
1	Win	1–0	Leonardo Martínez	KO	2	6 Mar 1974	Mexico City, Distrito Federal, Mexico	

== See also ==
- List of flyweight boxing champions
- List of WBC world champions
- List of Mexican boxing world champions

Achievements
Preceded by Koji Kobayashi	Lineal Flyweight Champion; 9 April 1984–8 October 1984	Succeeded by Sot Chitalada
Preceded by Koji Kobayashi	The Ring Flyweight Champion; 9 April 1984–8 October 1984	Succeeded by Sot Chitalada
Preceded by Koji Kobayashi	WBC Flyweight Champion; 9 April 1984–8 October 1984	Succeeded by Sot Chitalada
