= Guantes =

Guantes was a Spanish-language boxing magazine that was produced from Panama and later from New York City. The magazine's name means gloves in Spanish.

== Profile ==
The publisher of Guantes was Hispano American Publications. Chon Romero served as the editor-in-chief of the magazine for a long time. Guantes covered news from the boxing world with a special reference to hispanic boxing news. Each issue of the magazine featured the top ten boxers worldwide. Ring En Español, which stopped production in 1985, was the main competitor of the magazine.

Guantes held yearly award ceremonies to reward reigning world boxing champions. These ceremonies were usually celebrated at New York's restaurant, Victor's Cafe. Many corporate giants have sponsored the event: for many years, the event was called the Timex / Guantes awards, at other times, the Roblex | Guantes award.
