= Eleoncio Mercedes =

Dominican Republic boxer (1957-1985)

Personal information
- Nationality: Dominican
- Born: 12 September 1957 La Romana, Dominican Republic
- Died: 22 December 1985 (aged 28) Dominican Republic
- Height: 5 ft 6 in (168 cm)
- Weight: Flyweight
- Relative: Miguel Mercedes (brother)

Boxing career
- Stance: Orthodox

Boxing record
- Total fights: 28
- Wins: 14
- Win by KO: 3
- Losses: 12
- Draws: 2
Medal record
Men's Boxing
Representing Dominican Republic
Pan American Games
Silver medal – second place	1975 Mexico	Light Flyweight

Eleoncio Mercedes (September 12, 1957 – December 22, 1985) was a Dominican boxer, who was world champion in the Flyweight division.

== Amateur career ==
As an amateur he competed for his native country at the 1976 Summer Olympics in Montreal, Quebec, Canada. He was stopped in the first round of his opening round bout to Aleksandr Tkachenko of the Soviet Union. Mercedes was the flag bearer for the Dominican Republic in the 1976 opening ceremony.

== Pro career ==
Born in La Romana, Mercedes campaigned most of his career in the western United States and in Mexico. He debuted as a professional boxer on July 2 of 1978 with a win over Darryl Jones in Stockton. He suffered his first defeat when he lost by a decision in Las Vegas to future world champion Joey Olivo, in Mercedes' third bout as a paid fighter.

Mercedes' first of 11 fights in a row in Mexico came in 1979, when he lost by a knockout in seven rounds to Juan Díaz. During that span of 11 fights in Mexico, he went 6-3-2, fighting in such places as Mexico City, Monterrey and Reynosa. He lost to Candido Tellez but also beat former world champion Guty Espadas, by a knockout in nine during that span.

His first fight in the Dominican Republic was a 1982 rematch with Diaz, held in Santo Domingo. He won the fight by a decision in twelve rounds, to avenge his defeat at the hands of Diaz. Up until that moment, Mercedes' record was of 10 wins, 6 losses and 2 draws, reason why it was a little surprising to his fans when the WBC announced it would give Mercedes a chance at becoming a world champion, against two time world champion Freddie Castillo, who was in his second reign. The two boxers met on November 6 of 1982, at Los Angeles. Mercedes caused another surprise among many boxing fans by defeating Castillo by a decision in 15 rounds and becoming WBC and Lineal Flyweight champion.

In his first defense, Mercedes put the titles on the line against the British boxer Charlie Magri. In round seven, the fight had to be stopped because of a cut suffered by Mercedes, which had been determined to be from a punch by Magri. Mercedes then lost his world Flyweight championships by a technical knockout in that round.

After that, Mercedes kept on boxing, but had mixed fortunes. He managed to beat future world title challenger Alonzo Gonzalez by a decision, but lost to future world champion, Mexican German Torres by a knockout in the ninth round. Mercedes also lost a twelve-round decision to future world champion Raul Jibaro Perez, as well as being knocked out in the sixth round by former world Bantamweight champion Alberto Davila.

== Death ==
A few days before Christmas in 1985, Mercedes was shot and killed by a policeman in his native La Romana, aged 28, after allegedly pulling a gun on the policeman. Mercedes had been drinking in a bar when he was shot to death. Confusion exists as to how this incident took place as some sources state the altercation happened after a car accident.

== Professional boxing record ==
28 fights	14 wins	12 losses
By knockout	3	5
By decision	10	6
By disqualification	1	1
Draws	2	

No.	Result	Record	Opponent	Type	Round, time	Date	Location	Notes
28	Loss	14–12–2	Alberto Dávila	RTD	6 (10)	Nov 7, 1985	Olympic Auditorium, Los Angeles, California, U.S.	
27	Loss	14–11–2	Raúl Pérez	UD	10	Sep 23, 1985	Plaza de Toros El Toreo, Tijuana, Mexico	
26	Loss	14–10–2	Joel Meza	PTS	10	Oct 26, 1984	Mazatlan, Mexico	
25	Loss	14–9–2	Jong Kwan Chung	KO	5 (10), 2:24	Jul 22, 1984	Changchung Gymnasium, Seoul, South Korea	
24	Loss	14–8–2	Germán Torres	TKO	9 (10), 2:24	Mar 15, 1984	Olympic Auditorium, Los Angeles, California, U.S.	
23	Win	14–7–2	Alonzo Gonzalez	PTS	10	Dec 8, 1983	Olympic Auditorium, Los Angeles, California, U.S.	
22	Win	13–7–2	Javier Brown	DQ	4 (?)	Jul 2, 1983	La Romana, Dominican Republic	
21	Loss	12–7–2	Charlie Magri	TKO	7 (12), 1:14	Mar 15, 1983	Wembley Arena, Wembley, England, U.K.	Lost WBC and The Ring flyweight titles
20	Win	12–6–2	Freddy Castillo	SD	15	Nov 6, 1982	Olympic Auditorium, Los Angeles, California, U.S.	Won WBC and The Ring flyweight titles
19	Win	11–6–2	Juan Diaz	UD	12	Jul 17, 1982	La Romana, Dominican Republic	
18	Win	10–6–2	Antonio Escobar	TKO	10 (?)	Feb 13, 1982	Mexico City, Mexico	
17	Win	9–6–2	Juan Guzman	TKO	1 (?)	Sep 8, 1981	La Romana, Dominican Republic	
16	Loss	8–6–2	Candido Tellez	DQ	2 (?)	Jun 20, 1981	Mexico City, Mexico	
15	Win	8–5–2	Jorge Herrera	PTS	10	May 9, 1981	Mexico City, Mexico	
14	Win	7–5–2	Jose Herrera	PTS	10	Apr 3, 1981	Mexico City, Mexico	
13	Win	6–5–2	Guty Espadas	TKO	9 (10)	Feb 21, 1981	Merida, Mexico	
12	Draw	5–5–2	Jorge de Jesus	PTS	10	Jan 3, 1981	Mexico City, Mexico	
11	Draw	5–5–1	Jose Luis Cruz	PTS	10	Nov 1, 1980	Mexico City, Mexico	
10	Win	5–5	Rafael Morales	PTS	10	Sep 6, 1980	Mexico City, Mexico	
9	Win	4–5	Baldomero Santos	PTS	10	Jan 25, 1980	Monterrey, Mexico	
8	Loss	3–5	Jose Gallegos	PTS	10	Dec 21, 1979	Reynosa, Mexico	
7	Loss	3–4	Juan Diaz	TKO	7 (?)	Sep 29, 1979	Mexico City, Mexico	
6	Loss	3–3	Adelaido Galindo	UD	10	Mar 10, 1979	Forum, Inglewood, California, U.S.	
5	Win	3–2	Chocolate Reyes	SD	10	Nov 29, 1978	Silver Slipper, Las Vegas, Nevada, U.S.	
4	Loss	2–2	Aaron Morua	SD	10	Aug 30, 1978	Silver Slipper, Las Vegas, Nevada, U.S.	
3	Loss	2–1	Joey Olivo	UD	10	Aug 10, 1978	Olympic Auditorium, Los Angeles, California, U.S.	
2	Win	2–0	Juan Garcia	PTS	5	Jul 13, 1978	Olympic Auditorium, Los Angeles, California, U.S.	
1	Win	1–0	Darryl Jones	PTS	6	Jul 2, 1978	Memorial Civic Auditorium, Stockton, California, U.S.	

== Honors ==
The Polideportivo Eleoncio Mercedes Coliseum in La Romana, which opened in 1983, is named after him.

== See also ==
- List of world flyweight boxing champions
- List of people from the Dominican Republic

Sporting positions
World boxing titles
Preceded by Freddy Castillo	WBC flyweight champion 6 November 1982 – 15 March 1983	Succeeded by Charlie Magri
Preceded by Freddy Castillo	The Ring flyweight champion 6 November 1982 – 15 March 1983	Succeeded by Charlie Magri
