= Ring En Español =

Spanish language boxing magazine

The Ring En Español is a Spanish version of boxing publication The Ring magazine. Ring En Español was originally published from 1977 to 1985. Originally published from Caracas and later from Panama, it moved in 1981 to Miami, to Editorial America (currently owned by Televisa), the same editorial house that oversaw the production of Cosmopolitans Spanish version.

Although Ring En Español covered every boxing event worldwide, it concentrated more than anything else on Hispanic boxers, helping boxers like Wilfred Benítez, Wilfredo Gómez, Julio César Chávez, Eusebio Pedroza, Roberto Durán, Santos Laciar, Antonio Cervantes, Pipino Cuevas, Ossie Ocasio, Lupe Pintor, Rafael "Bazooka" Limón, Edwin Rosario, Héctor Camacho, Salvador Sanchez, Hilario Zapata and many others become international household names.

The unstable Latin American economy combined with rising magazine production costs and other factors caused The Ring En Español to come off the newsstands after the October 1985 edition. Lupe Pintor was featured on the magazine's last cover, having won the WBC Super Bantamweight championship of the world by defeating Juan Meza the previous August in Mexico City, Mexico.

The Ring en Español's top competitor was Guantes.

Starting in June 2019, The Ring magazine started publishing a Spanish version of the magazine, only in digital format.
