= Alfonso López (Panamanian boxer) =

Panamanian world Flyweight champion boxer

Personal information
- Nickname: Piedrita
- Born: 8 January 1953 (age 73) Chepigana, Panama
- Height: 1.60 m (5 ft 3 in)
- Weight: Flyweight

Boxing career

Boxing record
- Total fights: 59
- Wins: 39
- Win by KO: 21
- Losses: 18
- Draws: 2

Alfonso López (born 8 January 1953) is a Panamanian former professional boxer who competed from 1971 to 1985. He held the WBA flyweight title in 1976.

== Professional career ==
López boxed professionally from 1971 to 1985, compiling a record of 39 wins, 18 losses and 2 draws (ties), 21 wins and 8 losses coming by knockout. He had wins over Erbito Salavarria twice, including winning the WBA world Flyweight title with a fifteenth-round knockout on February 27, 1976 in Manila, Shoji Oguma, future multiple time world champion and hall of famer Hilario Zapata and Freddy Castillo in Castillo's hometown of Mérida, Yucatán, Mexico.

== Succession ==
Achievements
Preceded by Erbito Salavarria	WBA Flyweight Champion; 1976 Feb 27 – 1976 Oct 2	Succeeded by Guty Espadas
