= Alberto Morales (boxer) =

Mexican boxer (born 1948)

Personal information
- Born: 27 April 1948 (age 76); Acapulco, Mexico

Sport
- Sport: Boxing

Alberto Morales (born 27 April 1948) is a Mexican boxer. He competed in the men's light flyweight event at the 1968 Summer Olympics.
