= List of world flyweight boxing champions =

This is a list of world flyweight boxing champions, as recognized by the four major sanctioning organizations in boxing:

- The World Boxing Association (WBA), established in 1921 as the National Boxing Association (NBA). The WBA often recognize up to two world champions in a given weight class; Super champion and Regular champion.
- The World Boxing Council (WBC), established in 1963.
- The International Boxing Federation (IBF), established in 1983.
- The World Boxing Organization (WBO), established in 1988.

== World ==
Reign Began	Reign Ended	Champion	Recognition
Title inaugurated
11 April 1913	2 June 1913	Sid Smith	Universal
The organization which eventually became the British Boxing Board of Control recognized the flyweight division in 1911 and declared Sid Smith the first champion. Smith's bout with Eugene Criqui of France on 11 April 1913, was the first international flyweight championship contest.
2 June 1913	26 January 1914	Bill Ladbury	Universal
26 January 1914	15 May 1914	Percy Jones	Universal
Jones stripped of title after failing to make weight for a defense against Tancy Lee.
25 January 1915	18 October 1915	Tancy Lee	Universal
18 October 1915	14 February 1916	Joe Symonds	Universal
14 February 1916	18 June 1923	Jimmy Wilde	Universal
When Jimmy Wilde defeated American flyweight champion the Young Zulu Kid by an 11 round KO for the title in London on 18 December 1916, he was recognized in both Europe and America as the world flyweight champion.
18 June 1923	14 July 1925	Pancho Villa	Universal
Pancho Villa's death on 14 July 1925, following a loss to Jimmy "Baby Face" McLarnin on July 4, caused the title to be vacated. A bout on 22 August 1925, between Fidel La Barba and American Flyweight Champion Frankie Genaro saw the title go to La Barba who defeated Genaro in a 10-round decision.
15 July 1925	22 August 1925	Frankie Genaro	NYSAC
22 August 1925	25 August 1927-Vacated	Fidel LaBarba	Universal
The title again became vacant when Fidel La Barba retired to attend Stanford University in 1927. Soon after, several fighters claimed different versions of the title and it remained disputed until 1937. Of the champions who initially emerged following Barba's retirement Pinky Silverberg was the first when he briefly reigned as the NBA champion after his victory over Ruby Bradley via DQ on 22 October 1927, until he was stripped in December of 1927 when the NBA instead decided to hold a flyweight tournament for the title. After stripping Silverberg, the NBA did not include the former champion in the tournament. Instead, on 28 November 1927, Frenchy Belanger and Frankie Genaro fought a 10 round elimination bout where Belanger won via split decision. Belanger then advanced into a vacant title fight on 19 December 1927 where he defeated Ernie Jarvis, becoming the new NBA flyweight champion. The NYSAC held their own separate tournament in which Corporal Izzy Schwartz would ultimately win the vacated NYSAC title on 16 December 1927 when he defeated Newsboy Brown, who also went on to claim the California flyweight title by defeating Johnny McCoy in his first fight after the loss.
22 October 1927	3 December 1927-Stripped ^{4}	Pinky Silverberg	NBA
16 December 1927	22 August 1929 ^{2}	Corporal Izzy Schwartz	NSYAC
Schwartz was defeated by Willie LaMorte on 22 August 1929 when attempting to defend his NYSAC version of the title; however, the NYSAC refused to recognize LaMorte as champion when it was revealed that both boxers were being handled by the same manager.
19 December 1927	6 February 1928	Frenchy Belanger	NBA
6 February 1928	2 March 1929	Frankie Genaro	NBA
2 March 1929	18 April 1929	Emile Pladner	NBA/IBU
18 April 1929	26 October 1931	Frankie Genaro	NBA/IBU
There was much confusion about who was the real champion and in order to create a consensus champion; NBA champion Frankie Genaro and NYSAC champion Midget Wolgast met in the ring 20 December 1930 for the undisputed championship in Madison Square Garden. The encounter ended in a 15 round split decision draw with both champions retaining their titles. Rather than having another fight to clear the air, both fighters moved on and Wolgast lost to Small Montana while Genaro lost to Victor Perez
22 August 1929	3 Sep 1929-Stripped	Willie LaMorte	NYSAC
21 Mar 1930	16 September 1935	Midget Wolgast	NYSAC
Wolgast had won an 18-man tournament defeating Black Bill on 21 March 1930, in the tournament finals, for the vacant NYSAC flyweight title and in his first title defense defeated LaMorte, who had been claiming the championship since his victory over then NYSAC champion Corporal Izzy Schwartz.
26 October 1931	31 October 1932	Victor "Young" Perez	NBA/IBU
31 October 1932	9 September 1935	Jackie Brown	NBA/IBU/British
After Brown was sent to prison for four months for assault on 6 July 1934, he was stripped by the NBA for contravening their rules on 17 September. He maintained his British flyweight title, but the NBA were not the only ones to strip the champion as the IBU stripped Brown of the title when Brown did not honor a rematch with Velentin Anglemann after they fought to a draw for his world title. The organisation then matched Velentin Angelmann and Kid David for the vacant title. The IBU later stripped Angelmann for losing a bout to Peter Kane.
9 September 1935	19 January 1937	Benny Lynch	NBA/British
16 September 1935	19 January 1937	Small Montana	NYSAC
19 January 1937	29 June 1938 ^{4}	Benny Lynch	Universal
Lynch defeated Jackie Brown for his British title as well as for the vacant NBA title. Lynch and Montana then faced off for the undisputed championship, this being the first undisputed fight in the weight class in seven years as well as being between the consensus #1 and #2 fighters of the division; the vacant Ring Magazine flyweight title was also on the line for the fighters. The title was vacated when Lynch failed the weight requirement to qualify for the flyweight division and surrendered the title. Peter Kane defeated Jackie Jurich on 22 September 1938 to win the NBA championship, while the NYSAC title was discontinued.
22 September 1938	11 December 1939-Stripped	Peter Kane	NBA
Kane was stripped of the NBA and The Ring (magazine) titles on 11 December 11 1939, but the IBU continued to recognize him as champion.
11 December 1939	14 October 1943-Stripped	Little Dado	NBA
The NBA proclaimed Dado as champion in 1939. After one defense Dado could no longer make weight and was eventually stripped of the title.			
14 October 1943	31 July 1947	Jackie Paterson	Universal
Paterson stripped of his title by the NBA and the BBBofC because he was unable to make weight for a title defense against Dado Marino.
20 October 1947	30 March 1950	Rinty Monaghan	Universal
Monaghan wins the NBA and BBBofC titles by defeating Dado Marino on 20 October 1947. He wins universal recognition of champion after defeating Jackie Paterson on 23 March 1948. The title is vacated after Monaghan announces his retirement due to chronic bronchitis on 30 March 1950. The title is won by Terry Allen defeating Honore Pratesi in London, England by a 15-round decision on April 25.
25 April 1950	1 August 1950	Terry Allen	Universal
1 August 1950	19 May 1952	Dado Marino	Universal
19 May 1952	26 November 1954	Yoshio Shirai	Universal
26 November 1954	16 April 1960	Pascual Pérez	Universal
16 April 1960	10 October 1962	Pone Kingpetch	Universal
10 October 1962	12 January 1963	Masahiko "Fighting" Harada	Universal
12 January 1963	18 July 1963	Pone Kingpetch	Universal
18 July 1963	23 September 1964	Hiroyuki Ebihara	Universal
23 September 1964	23 April 1965	Pone Kingpetch	Universal
23 April 1965	14 June 1966	Salvatore Burruni	Universal
14 June 1966	30 December 1966	Walter McGowan	Lineal
30 December 1966	23 February 1969	Chartchai Chionoi	Lineal

== IBF ==
Reign Began	Reign Ended	Champion	Recognition
Title inaugurated
1983-12-24	1985-12-20	(South Korea) Kwon Soon-chun	IBF
1985-12-20	1986-04-27	(South Korea) Chung Jong-kwan	IBF
1986-04-27	1986-08-02	(South Korea) Jung Bi-won	IBF
1986-08-02	1987-02-22	(South Korea) Shin Hi-sup	IBF
1987-02-22	1987-09-05	(Philippines) Dodie Boy Peñalosa	IBF
1987-09-05	1988-01-16	(South Korea) Chang-Ho Choi	IBF
1988-01-16	1988-10-05	(Philippines) Rolando Bohol	IBF
1988-10-05	1989-06-07	(United Kingdom) Duke McKenzie	IBF
1989-06-07	1992-06-11	(United Kingdom) Dave McAuley	IBF
1992-06-11	1992-11-29	(Colombia) Rodolfo Blanco	IBF
1992-11-29	1994-11-25-Retired	(Thailand) Pichit Sitbangprachan	IBF
1995-02-18	1995-04-22	(Colombia) Francisco Tejedor	IBF
1995-04-22	1996-01-01-Vacated	(United States) Danny Romero	IBF
1996-05-04	1998-09-07-Vacated	(United States) Mark Johnson	IBF
1999-04-10	2004-12-16	(Colombia) Irene Pacheco	IBF
2004-12-16	2007-07-07	(Armenia) Vic Darchinyan	IBF
2007-07-07	2009-07-14-Vacated	(Philippines) Nonito Donaire	IBF
2009-11-20	2014-01-13-Vacated	(South Africa) Moruti Mthalane	IBF
2014-01-22	2016-05-25	(Thailand) Amnat Ruenroeng	IBF
2016-05-25	2016-12-21-Vacated	(Philippines) John Riel Casimero	IBF
2017-04-29	2018-04-11-Vacated	(Philippines) Donnie Nietes	IBF
2018-07-15	2021-04-30	(South Africa) Moruti Mthalane	IBF
2021-04-30	2023-12-16	(United Kingdom) Sunny Edwards	IBF
2023-12-16	2024-03-27	(United States) Jesse Rodriguez	IBF
2024-08-09	2025-03-29	(Mexico) Ángel Ayala	IBF
2025-03-29	Present	(Japan) Masamichi Yabuki	IBF

== WBC ==
Reign Began	Reign Ended	Champion	Recognition
Title inaugurated
1963-09-18	1964-01-23	(Japan) Hiroyuki Ebihara	WBC
1964-01-23	1965-04-23	(Thailand) Pone Kingpetch	WBC
1965-04-23	1965-11-18-Stripped	(Italy) Salvatore Burruni	WBC
1966-03-01	1968-10-02-Retired	(Argentina) Horacio Accavallo	WBC
1968-11-10	1969-02-23	(Thailand) Chartchai Chionoi	WBC
1969-02-23	1970-03-20	(Mexico) Efren Torres	WBC
1970-03-20	1970-12-07	(Thailand) Chartchai Chionoi	WBC
1970-12-07	1971-12-29-Stripped	(Philippines) Erbito Salavarria	WBC
1972-06-03	1972-09-29	(Venezuela) Betulio González	WBC
1972-09-29	1973-07-10-Vacated	(Thailand) Venice Borkhorsor	WBC
1973-08-04	1974-10-01	(Venezuela) Betulio González	WBC
1974-10-01	1975-01-08	(Japan) Shoji Oguma	WBC
1975-01-08	1979-03-18	(Mexico) Miguel Canto	WBC
1979-03-18	1980-05-18	(South Korea) Chan-Hee Park	WBC
1980-05-18	1981-05-12	(Japan) Shoji Oguma	WBC
1981-05-12	1982-03-20	(Mexico) Antonio Avelar	WBC
1982-03-20	1982-07-24	(Colombia) Prudencio Cardona	WBC
1982-07-24	1982-11-06	(Mexico) Freddy Castillo	WBC
1982-11-06	1983-03-15	(Dominican Republic) Eleoncio Mercedes	WBC
1983-03-15	1983-09-27	(United Kingdom) Charlie Magri	WBC
1983-09-27	1984-01-18	(Philippines) Frank Cedeno	WBC
1984-01-18	1984-04-09	(Japan) Koji Kobayashi	WBC
1984-04-09	1984-10-08	(Mexico) Gabriel Bernal	WBC
1984-10-08	1988-07-24	(Thailand) Sot Chitalada	WBC
1988-07-24	1989-06-03	(South Korea) Yong-Kang Kim	WBC
1989-06-03	1991-02-15	(Thailand) Sot Chitalada	WBC
1991-02-15	1992-06-23	(Thailand) Muangchai Kittikasem	WBC
1992-06-23	1997-11-12	(Russia) Yuri Arbachakov	WBC
1997-11-12	1998-12-04	(Thailand) Chatchai Sasakul	WBC
1998-12-04	1999-09-17-Stripped	(Philippines) Manny Pacquiao	WBC
1999-09-17	2000-05-19	(Thailand) Medgoen Singsurat	WBC
2000-05-19	2001-03-02	(Philippines) Malcolm Tuñacao	WBC
2001-03-02	2007-07-18	(Thailand) Pongsaklek Wonjongkam	WBC
2007-07-18	2009-11-29	(Japan) Daisuke Naito	WBC
2009-11-29	2010-03-27	(Japan) Kōki Kameda	WBC
2010-03-27	2012-03-02	(Thailand) Pongsaklek Wonjongkam	WBC
2012-03-02	2012-07-16	(Philippines) Sonny Boy Jaro	WBC
2012-07-16	2013-04-08	(Japan) Toshiyuki Igarashi	WBC
2013-04-08	2014-09-05	(Japan) Akira Yaegashi	WBC
2014-09-05	2016-09-29-Vacated	(Nicaragua) Román González	WBC
2017-03-04	2017-05-20	(Mexico) Juan Hernández	WBC
2017-05-20	2018-04-14-Stripped	(Japan) Daigo Higa	WBC
2018-04-15	2018-12-22	(Nicaragua) Cristofer Rosales	WBC
2018-12-22	2019-10-05	(United Kingdom) Charlie Edwards	WBC
2019-12-20	2024-05-22	(Mexico) Julio Cesar Martinez	WBC
2024-10-13	2025-07-30	(Japan) Kenshiro Teraji	WBC
2025-07-30	Present	(Mexico) Ricardo Sandoval	WBC

== WBA ==
Reign Began	Reign Ended	Champion	Recognition
Title inaugurated
1962-10-02	1963-01-12	(Japan) Fighting Harada	WBA
1963-01-12	1963-12-18	(Thailand) Pone Kingpetch	WBA
1963-12-18	1964-01-23	(Japan) Hiroyuki Ebihara	WBA
1964-01-23	1965-04-23	(Thailand) Pone Kingpetch	WBA
1965-04-23	1965-11-01-Stripped	(Italy) Salvatore Burruni	WBA
1966-03-01	1968-10-02-Retired	(Argentina) Horacio Accavallo	WBA
1969-03-30	1969-10-19	(Japan) Hiroyuki Ebihara	WBA
1969-10-19	1970-04-05	(Philippines) Bernabe Villacampo	WBA
1970-04-05	1970-10-22	(Thailand) Berkrerk Chartvanchai	WBA
1970-10-22	1973-01-24-Died	(Japan) Masao Ohba	WBA
1973-05-17	1974-10-18	(Thailand) Chartchai Chionoi	WBA
1974-10-18	1975-04-01	(Japan) Susumu Hanagata	WBA
1975-04-01	1976-02-27	(Philippines) Erbito Salavarria	WBA
1976-02-27	1976-10-02	(Panama) Alfonso Lopez	WBA
1976-10-02	1978-08-12	(Mexico) Guty Espadas	WBA
1978-08-12	1979-11-17	(Venezuela) Betulio González	WBA
1979-11-17	1980-02-17	(Panama) Luis Ibarra	WBA
1980-02-17	1980-12-13	(South Korea) Tae-Shik Kim	WBA
1980-12-13	1981-03-28	(South Africa) Peter Mathebula	WBA
1981-03-28	1981-06-06	(Argentina) Santos Benigno Laciar	WBA
1981-06-06	1981-09-26	(Panama) Luis Ibarra	WBA
1981-09-26	1982-05-01	(Mexico) Juan Herrera	WBA
1982-05-01	1985-07-19-Vacated	(Argentina) Santos Benigno Laciar	WBA
1985-10-05	1987-02-13	(Panama) Hilario Zapata	WBA
1987-02-13	1989-09-30	(Colombia) Fidel Bassa	WBA
1989-09-30	1990-03-10	(Venezuela) Jesus Kiki Rojas	WBA
1990-03-10	1990-07-29	(South Korea) Yul-Woo Lee	WBA
1990-07-29	1991-03-14	(Japan) Leopard Tamakuma	WBA
1991-03-14	1991-06-01	(Colombia) Elvis Álvarez	WBA
1991-06-01	1992-09-26	(South Korea) Yong-Kang Kim	WBA
1992-09-26	1992-12-15	(Venezuela) Aquiles Guzman	WBA
1992-12-15	1994-02-13	(Venezuela) David Griman	WBA
1994-02-13	1996-11-24	(Thailand) Saen Sor Ploenchit	WBA
1996-11-24	1998-05-29	(Venezuela) Jose Bonilla	WBA
1998-05-29	1999-03-13	(Argentina) Hugo Rafael Soto	WBA
1999-03-13	1999-09-03	(Venezuela) Leo Gamez	WBA
1999-09-03	2000-08-05	(Thailand) Sornpichai Kratingdaenggym	WBA
2000-08-05	2003-12-06	(United States) Eric Morel	WBA
2003-12-06	2007-03-18-Stripped	(Venezuela) Lorenzo Parra	WBA
2007-03-19	2008-12-31	(Japan) Takefumi Sakata	WBA
2008-12-31	2010-02-07	(Thailand) Denkaosan Kaovichit	WBA
2010-02-07	2011-01-04-Vacated	(Japan) Daiki Kameda	WBA
2011-01-04	2011-04-02	(Panama) Luis Concepcion	WBA
2011-04-02	2012-11-17	(Mexico) Hernan Marquez	WBA
2012-11-17	2013-04-06	(United States) Brian Viloria	WBA Super Champion
2012-11-17	2015-04-22	(Argentina) Juan Carlos Reveco	WBA Regular Champion
2013-04-06	2016-09-14-Vacated	(Mexico) Juan Francisco Estrada	WBA Super Champion
2015-04-22	2017-09-11-Vacated	(Japan) Kazuto Ioka	WBA Regular Champion
2018-02-24	2024-01-23	(Ukraine) Artem Dalakian	WBA Super Champion
2024-01-23	2025-03-13	(Japan) Seigo Yuri Akui	WBA
2024-10-13	2025-07-30	(Japan) Kenshiro Teraji	WBA
2025-07-30	Present	(Mexico) Ricardo Sandoval	WBA

== WBO ==
Reign Began	Reign Ended	Champion	Recognition
Title inaugurated
1989-03-03	1990-03-Vacated	(Colombia) Elvis Álvarez	WBO
1990-08-18	1992-03-18	(Mexico) Isidro Perez	WBO
1992-03-18	1993-05-15	(United Kingdom) Pat Clinton	WBO
1993-05-15	1995-02-11	(South Africa) Jacob Matlala	WBO
1995-02-11	1996-12-13	(Mexico) Alberto Jiménez	WBO
1996-12-13	1998-08-14	(Argentina) Carlos Gabriel Salazar	WBO
1998-08-14	1999-04-23	(Mexico) Ruben Sánchez León	WBO
1999-04-23	1999-Vacated	(Spain) José Antonio López Bueno	WBO
1999-12-18	2000-12-15	(Mexico) Isidro García	WBO
2000-12-15	2001-09-08-Vacated	(Mexico) Fernando Montiel	WBO
2002-05-04	2002-07-13	(Nicaragua) Adonis Rivas	WBO
2002-07-13	2010-05-14-Vacated	(Argentina) Omar Andres Narvaez	WBO
2010-06-12	2011-07-16	(Mexico) Julio César Miranda	WBO
2011-07-16	2013-04-06	(United States) Brian Viloria	WBO
2013-04-06	2016-09-14-Vacated	(Mexico) Juan Francisco Estrada	WBO
2016-11-05	2017-06-28	(China) Zou Shiming	WBO
2017-06-28	2018-09-24	(Japan) Sho Kimura	WBO
2018-09-24	2020-01-31-Vacated	(Japan) Kosei Tanaka	WBO
2020-11-06	2022-10-27-Vacated	(Japan) Junto Nakatani	WBO
2023-04-08	2024-03-29	(United States) Jesse Rodriguez	WBO
2024-07-20	Present	(United States) Anthony Olascuaga	WBO

== See also ==
- List of British world boxing champions
