= Horacio Accavallo =

Argentine boxer (1934–2022)

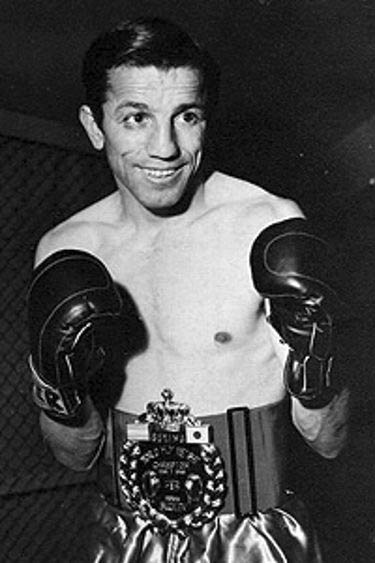

Personal information
- Nickname: Roquiño
- Born: Horacio Enrique Accavallo; 14 October 1934 Buenos Aires, Argentina
- Died: 14 September 2022 (aged 87)
- Height: 5 ft 1 1/2 in (156 cm)
- Weight: Flyweight

Boxing career
- Stance: Southpaw

Boxing record
- Total fights: 83
- Wins: 75
- Win by KO: 34
- Losses: 2
- Draws: 6

Horacio Enrique Accavallo (14 October 1934 – 14 September 2022) was an Argentine professional boxer who competed from 1956 until 1967. He held the undisputed World Boxing Association (WBA) and World Boxing Council (WBC) flyweight titles from 1966 to 1968.

== Professional career ==
Accavallo fought mainly in Argentina. On 1 March 1966, he won the vacant WBA & WBC world flyweight championship by outpointing Katsuyoshi Takayama on 15-round split decision in Tokyo, Japan. Accavallo had been the second contender for the world flyweight title held by Salvatore Burruni. The WBA & WBC had mandated that Burruni fight Hiroyuki Ebihara (the first contender). But Burruni chose to defend the title against Rocky Gattellari. The WBA & WBC stripped the champion of his crown and sanctioned the Accavallo - Katsuyoshi Takayama (the third contender) match for the title. Accavallo retired as the reigning WBA champion after escaping with a controversial 15 round majority decision victory over former world flyweight champion Hiroyuki Ebihara.

== Professional boxing record ==
83 fights	75 wins	2 losses
By knockout	34	1
By decision	40	1
By disqualification	1	0
Draws	6	

No.	Result	Record	Opponent	Type	Round, time	Date	Location	Notes
83	Win	75–2–6	Hiroyuki Ebihara	MD	15	12 Aug 1967	Estadio Luna Park, Buenos Aires, Argentina	Retained WBA flyweight title
82	Win	74–2–6	Heleno Vitor Ferreira	PTS	10	8 Jul 1967	Buenos Aires, Argentina	
81	Loss	73–2–6	Kiyoshi Tanabe	TKO	6 (10), 2:22	20 Feb 1967	Karakuen Hall, Tokyo, Japan	
80	Win	73–1–6	Efren Torres	UD	15	10 Dec 1966	Estadio Luna Park, Buenos Aires, Argentina	Retained WBA flyweight title
79	Win	72–1–6	Ursino Bernal	RTD	7 (10)	7 Oct 1966	Club Defensores de Villa Luján, San Miguel, Argentina	
78	Win	71–1–6	Juan Carlos Moreyra	PTS	10	23 Sep 1966	Concordia, Entre Ríos, Argentina	
77	Win	70–1–6	Hiroyuki Ebihara	UD	15	15 Jul 1966	Estadio Luna Park, Buenos Aires, Argentina	Retained WBA and WBC flyweight titles
76	Win	69–1–6	Pedro Hermógenes Guevara	KO	9 (10)	13 May 1966	Necochea, Buenos Aires, Argentina	
75	Win	68–1–6	Ursino Bernal	PTS	10	22 Apr 1966	Tres Arroyos, Buenos Aires, Argentina	
74	Win	67–1–6	Katsuyoshi Takayama	SD	15	1 Mar 1966	Nippon Budokan, Tokyo, Japan	Won vacant WBA and WBC flyweight titles
73	Win	66–1–6	Ursino Bernal	KO	8 (10)	17 Dec 1965	Asunción, Paraguay	
72	Win	65–1–6	Juan Carlos Moreyra	TKO	6 (10)	19 Nov 1965	Mendoza, Mendoza, Argentina	
71	Win	64–1–6	Pedro Hermógenes Guevara	TKO	8 (10)	20 Aug 1965	Río Cuarto, Córdoba, Argentina	
70	Win	63–1–6	Salvatore Burruni	UD	10	7 Aug 1965	Estadio Luna Park, Buenos Aires, Argentina	
69	Win	62–1–6	Ursino Bernal	PTS	10	16 Jul 1965	Río Cuarto, Córdoba, Argentina	
68	Win	61–1–6	Juan Carlos Moreyra	PTS	10	2 Jul 1965	Bahía Blanca, Buenos Aires, Argentina	
67	Win	60–1–6	Ursino Bernal	PTS	10	19 Jun 1965	Estadio Norte, Rosario, Santa Fe, Argentina	
66	Win	59–1–6	Juan Carlos Moreyra	KO	8 (10)	8 May 1965	Estadio Norte, Rosario, Santa Fe, Argentina	
65	Win	58–1–6	Demetrio Carbajal	KO	9 (10)	9 Apr 1965	Mar del Plata, Buenos Aires, Argentina	
64	Win	57–1–6	Nelson Alarcón	PTS	12	12 Dec 1964	Estadio Luna Park, Buenos Aires, Argentina	Retained Argentina flyweight title
63	Win	56–1–6	Eugenio Hurtado	TKO	6 (10)	26 Sep 1964	Estadio Luna Park, Buenos Aires, Argentina	
62	Win	55–1–6	Juan Carlos Moreyra	PTS	10	30 Jul 1964	Mar del Plata, Buenos Aires, Argentina	
61	Win	54–1–6	Juan Carlos Moreyra	PTS	10	3 Jul 1964	Río Gallegos, Santa Cruz, Argentina	
60	Win	53–1–6	Juan Carlos Moreyra	UD	10	12 Jun 1964	Club de Gimnasia y Esgrima La Plata, La Plata, Argentina	
59	Win	52–1–6	Eugenio Hurtado	UD	10	16 May 1964	Estadio Luna Park, Buenos Aires, Argentina	
58	Win	51–1–6	Armando Mansilla	TKO	5 (10)	21 Mar 1964	Salta, Salta, Argentina	
57	Win	50–1–6	Julio Romero	TKO	8 (10)	7 Feb 1964	Mar del Plata, Buenos Aires, Argentina	
56	Win	49–1–6	Abelardo Martínez	TKO	8 (10)	15 Jan 1964	Bahía Blanca, Buenos Aires, Argentina	
55	Win	48–1–6	Demetrio Carbajal	TKO	11 (12)	26 Oct 1963	Buenos Aires, Argentina	Retained Argentina flyweight title
54	Win	47–1–6	Julio Romero	PTS	10	10 Oct 1963	Estadio Norte, Rosario, Santa Fe, Argentina	
53	Win	46–1–6	Ursino Bernal	KO	8 (10)	28 Sep 1963	La Emilia, Buenos Aires, Argentina	
52	Win	45–1–6	Júpiter Mansilla	PTS	15	7 Sep 1963	Estadio Luna Park, Buenos Aires, Argentina	Retained South American flyweight title
51	Win	44–1–6	Fidel Folch	TKO	4 (10)	2 Aug 1963	San Miguel de Tucumán, Tucumán, Argentina	
50	Win	43–1–6	Armando Mansilla	PTS	10	13 Jul 1963	Mar del Plata, Buenos Aires, Argentina	
49	Win	42–1–6	Ramón Arias	UD	10	22 Jun 1963	Estadio Luna Park, Buenos Aires, Argentina	
48	Win	41–1–6	Fidel Folch	TKO	5 (10)	24 May 1963	Estadio Norte, Rosario, Santa Fe, Argentina	
47	Win	40–1–6	Armando Mansilla	PTS	10	10 May 1963	San Carlos de Bolívar, Buenos Aires, Argentina	
46	Win	39–1–6	Júpiter Mansilla	PTS	10	6 Apr 1963	Buenos Aires, Argentina	
45	Win	38–1–6	Júpiter Mansilla	PTS	10	16 Nov 1962	Palacio Peñarol, Montevideo, Uruguay	
44	Win	37–1–6	Carlos Omar Rodríguez	PTS	12	8 Sep 1962	Buenos Aires, Argentina	Retained Argentina flyweight title
43	Win	36–1–6	Jesús Hernández	TKO	9 (10)	21 Jul 1962	Buenos Aires, Argentina	
42	Win	35–1–6	Demetrio Carbajal	PTS	10	19 May 1962	Estadio Luna Park, Buenos Aires, Argentina	
41	Win	34–1–6	Salvatore Manca	DQ	8 (10)	14 Apr 1962	Estadio Luna Park, Buenos Aires, Argentina	
40	Win	33–1–6	Jesús Hernández	PTS	10	12 Dec 1961	Buenos Aires, Argentina	
39	Win	32–1–6	Júpiter Mansilla	PTS	15	7 Oct 1961	Estadio Luna Park, Buenos Aires, Argentina	Won vacant South American flyweight title
38	Win	31–1–6	Carlos Omar Rodríguez	PTS	12	1 Jul 1961	Estadio Luna Park, Buenos Aires, Argentina	Won Argentina flyweight title
37	Win	30–1–6	Juan Carlos Acebal	PTS	10	8 Apr 1961	Pergamino, Buenos Aires, Argentina	
36	Win	29–1–6	Carlos Miranda	PTS	10	22 Oct 1960	Estadio Luna Park, Buenos Aires, Argentina	
35	Win	28–1–6	Julio Barrera	KO	5 (10)	7 Sep 1960	Estadio Luna Park, Buenos Aires, Argentina	
34	Draw	27–1–6	Giacomo Spano	PTS	10	1 Jul 1960	Estadio Luna Park, Buenos Aires, Argentina	
33	Win	27–1–5	Antonio Gómez	TKO	7 (10)	9 Apr 1960	Estadio Luna Park, Buenos Aires, Argentina	
32	Loss	26–1–5	Salvatore Burruni	PTS	10	1 Aug 1959	Sassari, Sardinia, Italy	
31	Win	26–0–5	Giacomo Spano	PTS	10	30 May 1959	Cagliari, Sardinia, Italy	
30	Draw	25–0–5	Pablo Osuna	PTS	10	1 May 1959	Cagliari, Sardinia, Italy	
29	Win	25–0–4	Salvatore Manca	PTS	10	13 Apr 1959	Bergamo, Lombardy, Italy	
28	Draw	24–0–4	Salvatore Manca	PTS	10	12 Feb 1959	Rome, Lazio, Italy	
27	Draw	24–0–3	Giacomo Spano	PTS	10	5 Feb 1959	Cagliari, Sardinia, Italy	
26	Win	24–0–2	Angelo Rampin	PTS	8	14 Jan 1959	Milan, Lombardy, Italy	
25	Win	23–0–2	Francisco Carreno	PTS	10	12 Dec 1958	Cagliari, Sardinia, Italy	
24	Win	22–0–2	Giacomo Spano	PTS	10	20 Nov 1958	Sassari, Sardinia, Italy	
23	Win	21–0–2	Salvatore Burruni	PTS	8	12 Oct 1958	Stadio Amsicora, Cagliari, Sardinia, Italy	
22	Win	20–0–2	Ricardo Valdez	TKO	9 (10)	27 Aug 1958	Buenos Aires, Argentina	
21	Win	19–0–2	Avelino Romero	TKO	5 (10)	9 Jul 1958	Buenos Aires, Argentina	
20	Win	18–0–2	Hector Coria	TKO	8 (10)	13 May 1958	San Miguel de Tucumán, Argentina	
19	Win	17–0–2	Vicente Bruno	TKO	7 (10)	1 Apr 1958	San Miguel, Argentina	
18	Win	16–0–2	Juan Carlos Acebal	PTS	10	17 Jan 1958	Valentin Alsina, Argentina	
17	Win	15–0–2	Eduardo Lliuzzi	KO	6 (10)	6 Dec 1957	Valentin Alsina, Argentina	
16	Win	14–0–2	Hector Barrera	PTS	10	9 Nov 1957	Valentin Alsina, Argentina	
15	Win	13–0–2	Ramon Juarez	PTS	10	16 Aug 1957	San Miguel de Tucumán, Argentina	
14	Win	12–0–2	Marcelo Quiroga	TKO	6 (10)	15 May 1957	Buenos Aires, Argentina	
13	Win	11–0–2	Abraham Esteban	PTS	10	20 Apr 1957	Lanus, Argentina	
12	Draw	10–0–2	German Escudero	PTS	10	30 Mar 1957	C.A. San Lorenzo de Almagro, Buenos Aires, Argentina	
11	Win	10–0–1	Jose Costa	KO	4 (10)	22 Feb 1957	Lanus, Argentina	
10	Win	9–0–1	Carlos Cappozzuca	RTD	3 (10)	1 Feb 1957	Martínez, Argentina	
9	Win	8–0–1	Carlos Romero Luque	KO	7 (8)	25 Jan 1957	Lanus, Argentina	
8	Win	7–0–1	Hector Coria	KO	6 (8)	11 Jan 1957	Lanus, Argentina	
7	Win	6–0–1	Alfredo Rios	KO	4 (8)	28 Dec 1956	Buenos Aires, Argentina	
6	Draw	5–0–1	Luis Angel Jimenez	PTS	8	5 Dec 1956	Buenos Aires, Argentina	
5	Win	5–0	Lorenzo Ordenes	KO	2 (8)	30 Nov 1956	Valentin Alsina, Argentina	
4	Win	4–0	Cecilio Serantes	TKO	7 (8)	16 Nov 1956	Valentin Alsina, Argentina	
3	Win	3–0	Pablo Sosa	KO	3 (8)	12 Oct 1956	Martinez, Argentina	
2	Win	2–0	Mario Cabrera	KO	4 (6)	5 Oct 1956	Buenos Aires, Argentina	
1	Win	1–0	Emilio Avila	TKO	5 (6)	21 Sep 1956	Buenos Aires, Argentina	

== Titles in boxing ==
=== Major world titles ===
- WBA flyweight champion (112 lbs)
- WBC flyweight champion (112 lbs)

=== Regional/International titles ===
- Argentina flyweight champion (112 lbs)
- South American flyweight champion (112 lbs)

=== Undisputed titles ===
- Undisputed flyweight champion

== See also ==
- List of flyweight boxing champions

Sporting positions
World boxing titles
Vacant Title last held by Salvatore Burruni	WBA flyweight champion 1 March 1966 – 2 October 1968; Retired	Vacant Title next held by Hiroyuki Ebihara
Vacant Title last held by Salvatore Burruni	WBC flyweight champion 1 March 1966 – 2 October 1968; Retired	Vacant Title next held by Chartchai Chionoi
Vacant Title last held by Salvatore Burruni	Undisputed flyweight champion 1 March 1966 – 2 October 1968; Retired	Vacant
Vacant Title last held by Salvatore Burruni	Awards	
Preceded by Bernardo Otaño	Olimpia de Oro; 1966	Succeeded by Roberto De Vicenzo
