= Hiroyuki Ebihara =

Japanese boxer

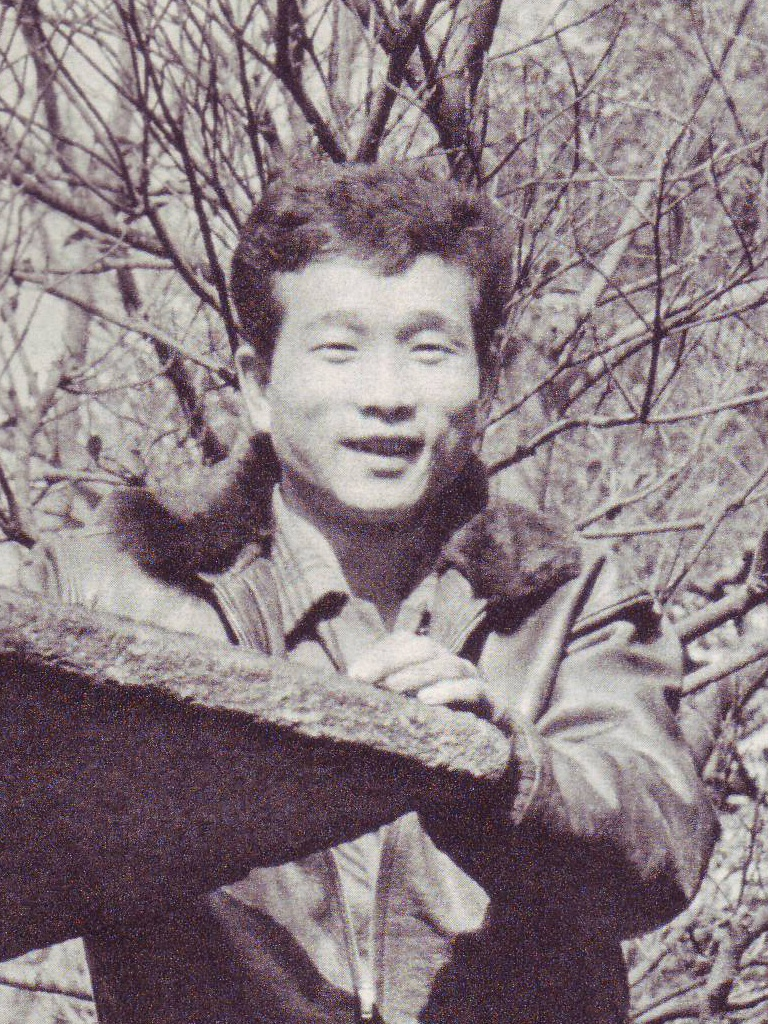
- Ebihara in 1962

Personal information
- Nickname: Razor Punch
- Born: Hiroyuki Matsuda; March 26, 1940 Fussa, Tokyo, Japan
- Died: April 20, 1991 (aged 51) Tokyo, Japan
- Height: 5 ft 4 in (163 cm)
- Weight: Flyweight

Boxing career
- Stance: Southpaw

Boxing record
- Total fights: 68
- Wins: 62
- Win by KO: 33
- Losses: 5
- Draws: 1

Hiroyuki Ebihara (海老原 博幸, Ebihara Hiroyuki; March 26, 1940 – April 20, 1991) was a Japanese former professional boxer who competed from 1959 to 1969. He held the WBA, WBC, and The Ring flyweight titles from 1963 to 1964 and the WBA flyweight title again in 1969. Yuri Arbachakov used the ring name Yuri Ebihara in honor of him and the Pokémon Ebiwalar (エビワラー, Ebiwarā), known as Hitmonchan in English, is named after him.

== Professional boxing record ==
68 fights	62 wins	5 losses
By knockout	33	0
By decision	29	5
Draws	1	

No.	Result	Record	Opponent	Type	Round	Date	Location	Notes
68	Loss	62–5–1	Bernabe Villacampo	UD	15	Oct 19, 1969	Prefectural Gymnasium, Osaka, Osaka, Japan	Lost WBA flyweight title
67	Win	62–4–1	Jose Garcia Lopez	KO	2 (10)	Jun 30, 1969	Prefectural Gymnasium, Okayama City, Okayama, Japan	
66	Win	61–4–1	Jose Severino	UD	15	Mar 30, 1969	Nakajima Sports Center, Sapporo, Hokkaido, Japan	Won vacant WBA flyweight title
65	Win	60–4–1	Ely Axinto	KO	3 (10)	Dec 23, 1968	Sendai, Miyagi, Japan	
64	Win	59–4–1	Bart Limin	KO	7 (10)	Jul 29, 1968	Tokyo, Japan	
63	Win	58–4–1	Rudy Ventura	PTS	10	May 20, 1968	Tokuyama, Yamaguchi, Japan	
62	Win	57–4–1	Yuzo Narumi	UD	10	Apr 8, 1968	Tokyo, Japan	
61	Win	56–4–1	Manuel Magallanes	RTD	4 (10)	Mar 4, 1968	Tokyo, Japan	
60	Loss	55–4–1	Horacio Accavallo	MD	15	Aug 12, 1967	Estadio Luna Park, Buenos Aires, Distrito Federal, Argentina	For WBA flyweight title
59	Win	55–3–1	Un Mo Oh	KO	5 (10)	Jul 10, 1967	Tokyo, Japan	
58	Win	54–3–1	Manuelo Balaba	UD	10	May 22, 1967	Tokyo, Japan	
57	Win	53–3–1	Speedy Hayase	PTS	10	Apr 10, 1967	Tokyo, Japan	
56	Loss	52–3–1	Horacio Accavallo	UD	15	Jul 15, 1966	Estadio Luna Park, Buenos Aires, Distrito Federal, Argentina	For WBA and WBC flyweight titles
55	Win	52–2–1	Dio Espinosa	KO	3 (10)	Apr 24, 1966	Tokyo, Japan	
54	Win	51–2–1	Bonny Boromeo	PTS	10	Nov 14, 1965	Toyota, Aichi, Japan	
53	Win	50–2–1	Un Mo Oh	TKO	6 (10)	Aug 15, 1965	Tokyo, Japan	
52	Win	49–2–1	Yoshio Nakane	PTS	10	Jul 4, 1965	Tokyo, Japan	
51	Win	48–2–1	Efren Torres	TKO	7 (12)	May 7, 1965	Memorial Coliseum, Los Angeles, California, U.S.	
50	Win	47–2–1	Shigeo Nirasawa	TKO	7 (10)	Mar 28, 1965	Tokyo, Japan	
49	Win	46–2–1	Hideki Osaka	TKO	3 (10)	Mar 13, 1965	Kure, Hiroshima, Japan	
48	Win	45–2–1	Katsuo Haga	PTS	10	Feb 7, 1965	Tokyo, Japan	
47	Win	44–2–1	Takeshi Nakamura	PTS	10	Jan 3, 1965	Tokyo, Japan	
46	Win	43–2–1	Hi Soo Kang	PTS	10	Nov 1, 1964	Nagoya, Aichi, Japan	
45	Win	42–2–1	Ric Magramo	PTS	10	Sep 7, 1964	Tokyo, Japan	
44	Win	41–2–1	Kung-Kang Nam	KO	10 (10)	Jul 19, 1964	Osaka, Osaka, Japan	
43	Win	40–2–1	Efren Torres	SD	12	Apr 30, 1964	Olympic Auditorium, Los Angeles, California, U.S.	
42	Win	39–2–1	Fabian Esquivel	UD	10	Mar 19, 1964	Olympic Auditorium, Los Angeles, California, U.S.	
41	Loss	38–2–1	Pone Kingpetch	SD	15	Jan 23, 1964	Rajadamnern Stadium, Bangkok, Thailand	Lost WBA, WBC, and The Ring flyweight titles
40	Win	38–1–1	Henry Acido	KO	10 (10)	Nov 20, 1963	Nagoya, Aichi, Japan	
39	Win	37–1–1	Pone Kingpetch	KO	1 (15)	Sep 18, 1963	Metropolitan Gym, Tokyo, Japan	Won WBA, WBC, and The Ring flyweight titles
38	Win	36–1–1	Masao Ogawa	TKO	9 (10)	Aug 1, 1963	Tokyo, Japan	
37	Win	35–1–1	Young Bonnie	KO	1 (10)	Jul 17, 1963	Tokyo, Japan	
36	Win	34–1–1	Billy Brown	UD	10	Mar 27, 1963	Tokyo, Japan	
35	Win	33–1–1	Vic Campo	UD	10	Feb 1, 1963	City Gymnasium, Hachioji, Tokyo, Japan	
34	Win	32–1–1	Chartchai Chionoi	UD	12	Dec 31, 1962	Yasaka Hall, Kyoto, Kyoto, Japan	
33	Win	31–1–1	Roberto Luna	KO	3 (10)	Dec 6, 1962	Tokyo, Japan	
32	Win	30–1–1	Manuel Magallanes	UD	10	Nov 21, 1962	Tokyo, Japan	
31	Win	29–1–1	Narongrit Jalengkabo	KO	3 (10)	Oct 26, 1962	Tokyo, Japan	
30	Win	28–1–1	Shinsuke Taniwaki	TKO	1 (10)	Sep 28, 1962	Otemae Hall, Osaka, Osaka, Japan	
29	Win	27–1–1	Ray Perez	KO	8 (10)	Sep 6, 1962	Tokyo, Japan	
28	Win	26–1–1	Little Rufe	KO	3 (10)	Aug 13, 1962	Tokyo, Japan	
27	Win	25–1–1	Cherngchai Laemfapha	KO	2 (10)	Jul 27, 1962	Tokyo, Japan	
26	Win	24–1–1	Katsuo Haga	UD	10	May 4, 1962	Tokyo, Japan	
25	Win	23–1–1	Ray Ortiz	KO	3 (10)	Apr 12, 1962	Tokyo, Japan	
24	Win	22–1–1	Takeshi Nakamura	UD	10	Mar 9, 1962	Tokyo, Japan	
23	Win	21–1–1	Marcel Juban	RTD	6 (10)	Feb 8, 1962	Tokyo, Japan	
22	Win	20–1–1	Sombang Banbung	KO	4 (10)	Jan 6, 1962	Tokyo, Japan	
21	Win	19–1–1	Kazuyoshi Yamakawa	TKO	1 (10)	Dec 15, 1961	Tokyo, Japan	
20	Win	18–1–1	Johnny Jamito	MD	10	Oct 30, 1961	Tokyo, Japan	
19	Win	17–1–1	Shigeru Ito	KO	2 (10)	Sep 29, 1961	Tokyo, Japan	
18	Win	16–1–1	Singtong Por Tor	UD	10	Aug 27, 1961	Tokyo, Japan	
17	Win	15–1–1	Hajime Taroura	KO	3 (10)	Jul 28, 1961	Tokyo, Japan	
16	Win	14–1–1	Seinosuke Tsuchiya	UD	6	Jun 27, 1961	Kokugikan, Tokyo, Japan	
15	Win	13–1–1	Yoshikatsu Furukawa	TKO	3 (10)	Jun 9, 1961	Tokyo, Japan	
14	Draw	12–1–1	Takeshi Nakamura	PTS	6	May 18, 1961	Tokyo, Japan	
13	Win	12–1	Katsutoshi Aoki	KO	2 (6)	Apr 5, 1961	Tokyo, Japan	
12	Win	11–1	Kinichiro Toyama	UD	6	Feb 22, 1961	Tokyo, Japan	
11	Win	10–1	Shigeo Nirasawa	UD	6	Jan 27, 1961	Tokyo, Japan	
10	Loss	9–1	Fighting Harada	PTS	6	Dec 24, 1960	Tokyo, Japan	
9	Win	9–0	Masayuki Matsuzawa	TKO	2 (4)	Dec 11, 1960	Tokyo, Japan	
8	Win	8–0	Takeshi Nakamura	MD	4	Nov 23, 1960	Tokyo, Japan	
7	Win	7–0	Nagao Nagahata	KO	1 (4)	Nov 7, 1960	Tokyo, Japan	
6	Win	6–0	Kazutoshi Oi	UD	4	Oct 26, 1960	Tokyo, Japan	
5	Win	5–0	Masayuki Matsuzawa	UD	4	Aug 29, 1960	Korakuen Baseball Stadium, Tokyo, Japan	
4	Win	4–0	Kiyoshi Fujio	TKO	1 (4)	Jun 17, 1960	Tokyo, Japan	
3	Win	3–0	Shoichi Saito	PTS	4	Oct 16, 1959	Tokyo, Japan	
2	Win	2–0	Yasuhiko Murai	PTS	4	Oct 1, 1959	Tokyo, Japan	
1	Win	1–0	Kazuhiko Kurihara	KO	4 (4)	Sep 20, 1959	Tokyo, Japan	

== Titles in boxing ==
=== Major world titles ===
- WBA flyweight champion (112 lbs) (2×)
- WBC flyweight champion (112 lbs)

=== The Ring magazine titles ===
- The Ring flyweight champion (112 lbs)

=== Undisputed titles ===
- Undisputed flyweight champion

== See also ==
- List of flyweight boxing champions
- List of Japanese boxing world champions
- Boxing in Japan
- Hitmonchan

Sporting positions
World boxing titles
Preceded by Pone Kingpetch	WBA flyweight Champion; September 18, 1963 - January 23, 1964	Succeeded by Pone Kingpetch
Inaugural	WBC flyweight champion September 18, 1963 - January 23, 1964	Succeeded by Pone Kingpetch
Preceded by Pone Kingpetch	The Ring flyweight champion September 18, 1963 - January 23, 1964	Succeeded by Pone Kingpetch
Vacant Title last held by Fidel LaBarba	Undisputed flyweight champion September 18, 1963 - January 23, 1964	Succeeded by Pone Kingpetch
Vacant Title last held by Horacio Accavallo	WBA flyweight champion March 30, 1969 - October 19, 1969	Succeeded by Bernabe Villacampo
