= Fritz Chervet =

Swiss boxer (1942–2020)

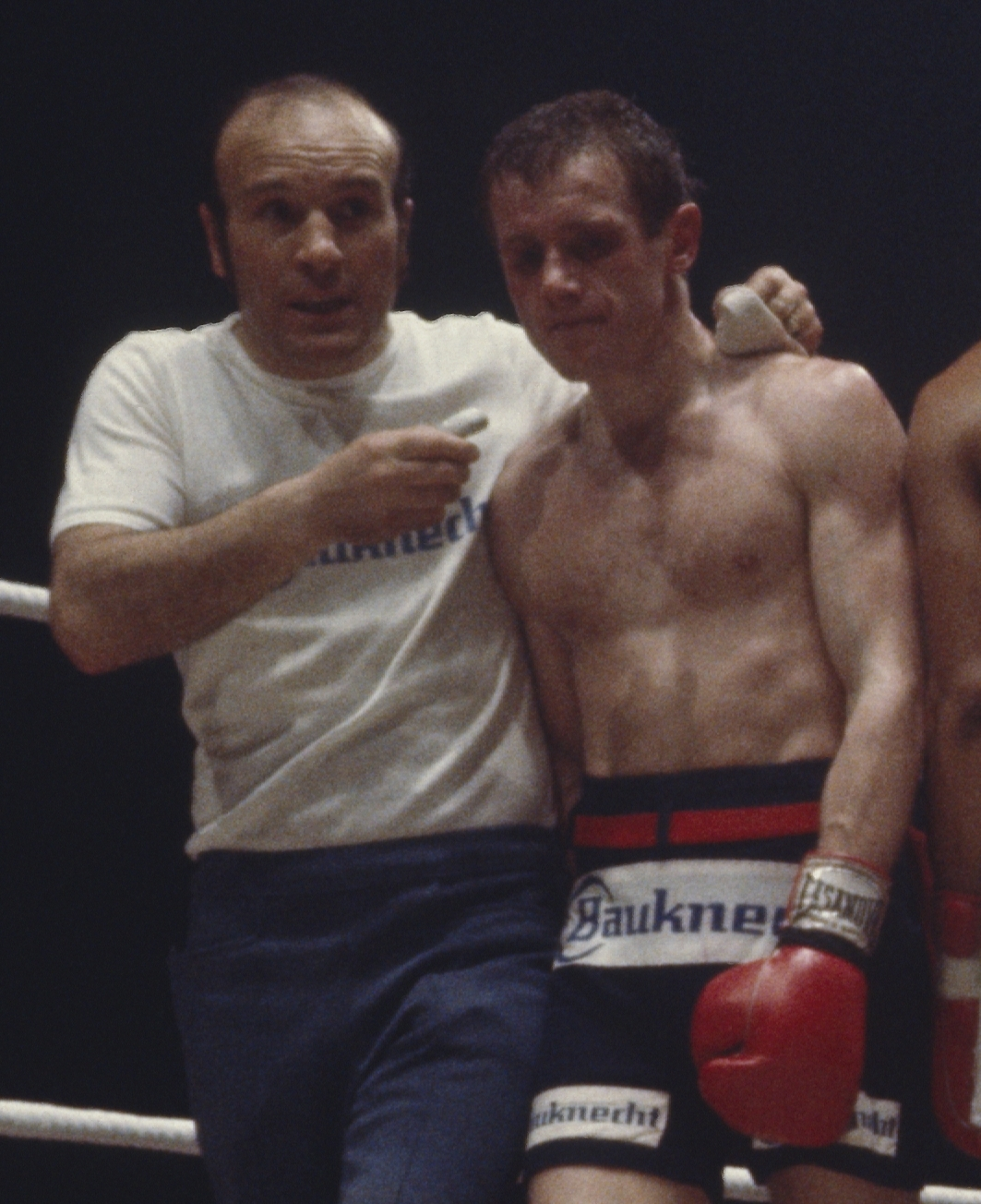
- Fritz Chervet vs Chartchai Chionoi 1974 (Com LC0566-003)

Personal information
- Nationality: Swiss
- Born: 1 October 1942 Bern, Switzerland
- Died: 29 August 2020 (aged 77) Murten, Switzerland
- Height: 5 ft 5 in (165 cm)
- Weight: Flyweight

Boxing career

Boxing record
- Total fights: 71
- Wins: 59
- Win by KO: 25
- Losses: 9
- Draws: 2
- No contests: 1

Fritz Chervet (1 October 1942 – 29 August 2020) was a Swiss professional boxer who challenged for the WBA flyweight title twice in 1973 and 1974. At regional level he held the European flyweight title twice between 1972 and 1974.

== Biography ==
Chervet's boxing career began on 18 May 1962 in Geneva against Daniel Villaume. He became the European flyweight champion on 3 March 1972 after a victory against Fernando Atzori by referee stoppage in the eleventh round. He lost the European title the next year but regained it on 26 December 1973. He was twice defeated for the world title by Chartchai Chionoi in 1973 and 1974. He retired in 1976 with a record of 59 wins, 9 losses, 2 draws, and 1 no contest. After his sporting career, he became a bailiff at the Federal Palace of Switzerland.

Fritz Chervet died on 29 August 2020 at the age of 77.
