= Efren Torres =

Mexican boxer

- Born: November 29, 1943; La Palma, Michoacán, Mexico
- Died: February 25, 2010 (aged 66)
- Nickname: El Alacrán
- Height: 1.63 m (5 ft 4 in)
- Division: Flyweight
- Stance: Orthodox

Professional boxing record
- Total: 74
- Wins: 64
- By knockout: 41
- Losses: 9
- By knockout: 3
- Draws: 1

Efren Torres (November 29, 1943 – February 25, 2010) was a Mexican world champion professional boxer in the flyweight division. Torres was born in La Palma, Michoacán Mexico in 1943. He spent most of his early life in his family town of Guadalajara.

== Professional career ==
Known as "El Alacrán", Torres turned pro in 1961 and in 1969 after two unsuccessful bids at a major title, he defeated WBC and Lineal Champion Chartchai Chionoi of Thailand by decision to become the flyweight world champion. He lost the title in his second defense to Chartchai Chionoi by decision in 1970. He retired in 1972.

== Honours ==
Torres was inducted into the World Boxing Hall of Fame in the Class of 2007.

== Professional boxing record ==
| 74 fights | 64 wins | 9 losses |
|---|---|---|
| By knockout | 41 | 3 |
| By decision | 23 | 6 |
| Draws | 1 | |

| No. | Result | Record | Opponent | Type | Round | Date | Age | Location | Notes |
|---|---|---|---|---|---|---|---|---|---|
| 74 | Win | 64–9–1 | Issac Isao Kimura | KO | 2 (10) | Apr 21, 1972 | 28 years, 144 days | Arena Coliseo, Guadalajara, Jalisco, Mexico | |
| 73 | Loss | 63–9–1 | Rubén Olivares | TKO | 4 (10) | Jul 10, 1971 | 27 years, 223 days | Auditorio del Estado, Guadalajara, Jalisco, Mexico | |
| 72 | Loss | 63–8–1 | Julio Guerrero | SD | 10 | Feb 2, 1971 | 27 years, 65 days | Auditorio Municipal, Tijuana, Baja California, Mexico | |
| 71 | Win | 63–7–1 | José Medel | KO | 4 (10) | Oct 31, 1970 | 26 years, 336 days | Arena Coliseo, Guadalajara, Jalisco, Mexico | |
| 70 | Win | 62–7–1 | Rocky Garcia | SD | 10 | Jun 28, 1970 | 26 years, 211 days | Plaza de Toros Monumental, Monterrey, Nuevo León, Mexico | |
| 69 | Loss | 61–7–1 | Chartchai Chionoi | UD | 15 | Mar 20, 1970 | 26 years, 111 days | National Stadium Gymnasium, Bangkok, Thailand | Lost WBC and The Ring flyweight titles |
| 68 | Win | 61–6–1 | Susumu Hanagata | UD | 15 | Nov 28, 1969 | 25 years, 364 days | Plaza de Toros Nuevo Progreso, Guadalajara, Jalisco, Mexico | Retained WBC and The Ring flyweight titles |
| 67 | Win | 60–6–1 | Heleno Ferreira | PTS | 10 | Sep 30, 1969 | 25 years, 305 days | Auditorio del Estado, Guadalajara, Jalisco, Mexico | |
| 66 | Loss | 59–6–1 | Susumu Hanagata | UD | 10 | Jun 19, 1969 | 25 years, 202 days | Olympic Auditorium, Los Angeles, California, U.S. | |
| 65 | Win | 59–5–1 | Chartchai Chionoi | TKO | 8 (15) | Feb 23, 1969 | 25 years, 86 days | El Toreo de Cuatro Caminos, Mexico City, Distrito Federal, Mexico | Won WBC and The Ring flyweight titles |
| 64 | Win | 58–5–1 | Apolonio Salinas | KO | 2 (10) | Nov 19, 1968 | 24 years, 356 days | Freeman Coliseum, San Antonio, Texas, U.S. | |
| 63 | Win | 57–5–1 | Daniel Gutierrez | PTS | 10 | Nov 8, 1968 | 24 years, 345 days | Reynosa, Tamaulipas, Mexico | |
| 62 | Win | 56–5–1 | Eduardo Mojica | PTS | 10 | Sep 15, 1968 | 24 years, 291 days | Mexico City, Distrito Federal, Mexico | |
| 61 | Win | 55–5–1 | Santos Sandoval | KO | 9 (10) | Aug 16, 1968 | 24 years, 261 days | Nuevo Laredo, Tamaulipas, Mexico | |
| 60 | Win | 54–5–1 | Pedro Cordero | TKO | 6 (10) | May 28, 1968 | 24 years, 181 days | Puerto Vallarta, Jalisco, Mexico | |
| 59 | Loss | 53–5–1 | Chartchai Chionoi | TKO | 13 (15) | Jan 28, 1968 | 24 years, 60 days | El Toreo de Cuatro Caminos, Mexico City, Distrito Federal, Mexico | For WBC and The Ring flyweight titles |
| 58 | Win | 53–4–1 | José Medel | PTS | 10 | Oct 7, 1967 | 23 years, 312 days | Arena Coliseo, Guadalajara, Jalisco, Mexico | |
| 57 | Win | 52–4–1 | Jupiter Mansilla | TKO | 3 (10) | Sep 16, 1967 | 23 years, 291 days | Arena Coliseo, Guadalajara, Jalisco, Mexico | |
| 56 | Win | 51–4–1 | Pornchai Poprai ngam | PTS | 10 | Jul 10, 1967 | 23 years, 223 days | Plaza de Toros, Tijuana, Baja California, Mexico | |
| 55 | Win | 50–4–1 | Octavio Gomez | KO | 5 (12) | Apr 29, 1967 | 23 years, 151 days | Arena Mexico, Mexico City, Distrito Federal, Mexico | Retained Mexico flyweight title |
| 54 | Loss | 49–4–1 | Horacio Accavallo | UD | 15 | Dec 10, 1966 | 23 years, 11 days | Estadio Luna Park, Buenos Aires, Distrito Federal, Argentina | For WBA flyweight title |
| 53 | Win | 49–3–1 | Luis Gonzalez | TKO | 2 (12) | Aug 7, 1966 | 22 years, 251 days | El Toreo de Cuatro Caminos, Mexico City, Distrito Federal, Mexico | Retained Mexico flyweight title |
| 52 | Win | 48–3–1 | Ramiro Nides | KO | 5 (12) | Jul 2, 1966 | 22 years, 215 days | Hermosillo, Sonora, Mexico | |
| 51 | Draw | 47–3–1 | Fermin Goméz | PTS | 12 | May 14, 1966 | 22 years, 166 days | Arena Coliseo, Guadalajara, Jalisco, Mexico | Retained Mexico flyweight title |
| 50 | Win | 47–3 | José López | TKO | 6 (10) | Apr 3, 1966 | 22 years, 125 days | Gimnasio de Mexicali, Mexicali, Baja California, Mexico | |
| 49 | Win | 46–3 | Manuel Tarazon | KO | 3 (10) | Mar 12, 1966 | 22 years, 103 days | Culiacan, Sinaloa, Mexico | |
| 48 | Win | 45–3 | Bob Allotey | PTS | 10 | Dec 11, 1965 | 22 years, 12 days | El Toreo de Cuatro Caminos, Mexico City, Distrito Federal, Mexico | |
| 47 | Win | 44–3 | Manuel Flores | TKO | 6 (10) | Oct 16, 1965 | 21 years, 321 days | Arena Coliseo, Guadalajara, Jalisco, Mexico | |
| 46 | Loss | 43–3 | Hiroyuki Ebihara | TKO | 7 (12) | May 7, 1965 | 21 years, 159 days | Memorial Coliseum, Los Angeles, California, U.S. | |
| 45 | Win | 43–2 | Manuel Magallanes | TKO | 2 (12) | Feb 28, 1965 | 21 years, 91 days | Plaza de Toros Monumental, Monterrey, Nuevo León, Mexico | |
| 44 | Win | 42–2 | Ismael Gutierrez | KO | 2 (12) | Jan 29, 1965 | 21 years, 61 days | Ciudad Juarez, Chihuahua, Mexico | |
| 43 | Win | 41–2 | Mauro Miranda | KO | 2 (12) | Nov 14, 1964 | 20 years, 351 days | El Toreo de Cuatro Caminos, Mexico City, Distrito Federal, Mexico | Retained Mexico flyweight title |
| 42 | Win | 40–2 | Luis Gonzalez | KO | 7 (10) | Sep 11, 1964 | 20 years, 287 days | Olympic Auditorium, Los Angeles, California, U.S. | |
| 41 | Win | 39–2 | Evaristo Salinas | PTS | 12 | Aug 15, 1964 | 20 years, 260 days | Arena Progreso, Guadalajara, Jalisco, Mexico | Retained Mexico flyweight title |
| 40 | Loss | 38–2 | Hiroyuki Ebihara | SD | 12 | Apr 30, 1964 | 20 years, 153 days | Olympic Auditorium, Los Angeles, California, U.S. | |
| 39 | Win | 38–1 | Leo Zulueta | UD | 10 | Mar 15, 1964 | 20 years, 107 days | Arena Progreso, Guadalajara, Jalisco, Mexico | |
| 38 | Win | 37–1 | Jose Hernandez | KO | 3 (10) | Feb 15, 1964 | 20 years, 78 days | Culiacan, Sinaloa, Mexico | |
| 37 | Win | 36–1 | Manuel Magallanes | TKO | 7 (10) | Feb 2, 1964 | 20 years, 65 days | El Toreo de Cuatro Caminos, Mexico City, Distrito Federal, Mexico | |
| 36 | Win | 35–1 | Fabian Esquivel | KO | 1 (12) | Nov 30, 1963 | 20 years, 1 day | El Toreo de Cuatro Caminos, Mexico City, Distrito Federal, Mexico | Won vacant Mexico flyweight title |
| 35 | Win | 34–1 | Pascual Pérez | KO | 3 (10) | Oct 19, 1963 | 19 years, 324 days | Arena Coliseo, Guadalajara, Jalisco, Mexico | |
| 34 | Win | 33–1 | Natalio Jimenez | KO | 2 (10) | Sep 28, 1963 | 19 years, 303 days | Arena Coliseo, Guadalajara, Jalisco, Mexico | |
| 33 | Win | 32–1 | Raul Veloz | KO | 1 (10) | Aug 17, 1963 | 19 years, 261 days | Ciudad Juarez, Chihuahua, Mexico | |
| 32 | Win | 31–1 | Carlos Gomez | KO | 6 (12) | Jul 6, 1963 | 19 years, 219 days | Arena Mexico, Mexico City, Distrito Federal, Mexico | |
| 31 | Win | 30–1 | Jose Valenzuela | KO | 1 (10) | Apr 21, 1963 | 19 years, 143 days | Plaza de Toros, Ciudad Juarez, Chihuahua, Mexico | |
| 30 | Win | 29–1 | Pimi Amador | KO | 1 (10) | Apr 5, 1963 | 19 years, 127 days | Olympic Auditorium, Los Angeles, California, U.S. | |
| 29 | Win | 28–1 | Changa Munoz | KO | 4 (5) | Mar 21, 1963 | 19 years, 112 days | Dodger Stadium, Los Angeles, California, U.S. | |
| 28 | Win | 27–1 | Fidel Alfaro | KO | 8 (10) | Feb 16, 1963 | 19 years, 79 days | Arena Mexico, Mexico City, Distrito Federal, Mexico | |
| 27 | Win | 26–1 | Carlos Gomez | TKO | 7 (10) | Nov 24, 1962 | 18 years, 360 days | Arena Coliseo, Guadalajara, Jalisco, Mexico | |
| 26 | Win | 25–1 | Ernesto Barrera | PTS | 10 | Oct 13, 1962 | 18 years, 318 days | Arena Coliseo, Guadalajara, Jalisco, Mexico | |
| 25 | Loss | 24–1 | Eduardo Mojica | PTS | 10 | Jul 29, 1962 | 18 years, 242 days | Managua, Nicaragua | |
| 24 | Win | 24–0 | Ernesto Barrera | PTS | 10 | Jun 9, 1962 | 18 years, 192 days | Arena Coliseo, Guadalajara, Jalisco, Mexico | |
| 23 | Win | 23–0 | Eduardo Mojica | PTS | 10 | May 5, 1962 | 18 years, 157 days | Arena Coliseo, Guadalajara, Jalisco, Mexico | |
| 22 | Win | 22–0 | Luis Mendez | PTS | 10 | Mar 3, 1962 | 18 years, 94 days | Arena Coliseo, Guadalajara, Jalisco, Mexico | |
| 21 | Win | 21–0 | Jose Valenzuela | TKO | 2 (10) | Feb 1, 1962 | 18 years, 64 days | Arena Olímpico Laguna, Gomez Palacio, Durango, Mexico | |
| 20 | Win | 20–0 | Chico Jasso | PTS | 10 | Jan 13, 1962 | 18 years, 45 days | Arena Coliseo, Guadalajara, Jalisco, Mexico | |
| 19 | Win | 19–0 | Chocolate Barrera | KO | 4 (10) | Dec 2, 1961 | 18 years, 3 days | Tepic, Nayarit, Mexico | |
| 18 | Win | 18–0 | Eduardo Mojica | PTS | 10 | Nov 11, 1961 | 17 years, 347 days | Arena Coliseo, Guadalajara, Jalisco, Mexico | |
| 17 | Win | 17–0 | Felix Padilla | PTS | 10 | Oct 7, 1961 | 17 years, 312 days | Arena Coliseo, Guadalajara, Jalisco, Mexico | |
| 16 | Win | 16–0 | Chabelo Mejia | KO | 3 (10) | Sep 16, 1961 | 17 years, 291 days | Arena Coliseo, Guadalajara, Jalisco, Mexico | |
| 15 | Win | 15–0 | Vicente Ramirez | KO | 2 (8) | Aug 19, 1961 | 17 years, 263 days | Arena Coliseo, Guadalajara, Jalisco, Mexico | |
| 14 | Win | 14–0 | Luis Lujano | RTD | 4 (8) | Jul 22, 1961 | 17 years, 235 days | Arena Coliseo, Guadalajara, Jalisco, Mexico | |
| 13 | Win | 13–0 | Kid Celaya | PTS | 10 | Apr 25, 1961 | 17 years, 147 days | Leon, Guanajuato, Mexico | |
| 12 | Win | 12–0 | Polo Ruiz | KO | 4 (10) | Mar 4, 1961 | 17 years, 95 days | Tepic, Nayarit, Mexico | |
| 11 | Win | 11–0 | Vicente Rios | PTS | 6 | Oct 22, 1960 | 16 years, 328 days | Arena Coliseo, Guadalajara, Jalisco, Mexico | |
| 10 | Win | 10–0 | Javier Paz | KO | 2 (6) | Jul 23, 1960 | 16 years, 237 days | Arena Coliseo, Guadalajara, Jalisco, Mexico | |
| 9 | Win | 9–0 | Polo Ruiz | PTS | 6 | Jul 2, 1960 | 16 years, 216 days | Arena Coliseo, Guadalajara, Jalisco, Mexico | |
| 8 | Win | 8–0 | Javier Paz | KO | 4 (6) | Mar 26, 1960 | 16 years, 118 days | Arena Coliseo, Guadalajara, Jalisco, Mexico | |
| 7 | Win | 7–0 | Servando Hernandez | TKO | 2 (8) | Feb 27, 1960 | 16 years, 90 days | Arena Colima, Colima, Colima, Mexico | |
| 6 | Win | 6–0 | Jose Tinoco | KO | 4 (?) | Dec 20, 1959 | 16 years, 21 days | Tepic, Nayarit, Mexico | |
| 5 | Win | 5–0 | Chiquilin Ramirez | KO | 1 (6) | Nov 14, 1959 | 15 years, 350 days | Arena Colima, Colima, Colima, Mexico | |
| 4 | Win | 4–0 | Vincente Rios | PTS | 4 | Oct 24, 1959 | 15 years, 329 days | Arena Coliseo, Guadalajara, Jalisco, Mexico | |
| 3 | Win | 3–0 | Ratoncito Garcia | KO | ? (6) | Sep 19, 1959 | 15 years, 294 days | Arena Colima, Colima, Colima, Mexico | |
| 2 | Win | 2–0 | Zurdo Padilla | PTS | 4 | May 16, 1959 | 15 years, 168 days | Arena Colima, Colima, Colima, Mexico | |
| 1 | Win | 1–0 | Jose Sanchez Tavio | PTS | 4 | Feb 28, 1959 | 15 years, 91 days | Arena Colima, Colima, Colima, Mexico | |

== See also ==
- List of flyweight boxing champions
- List of WBC world champions
- List of Mexican boxing world champions

Sporting positions
World boxing titles
| Preceded by Chartchai Chionoi | WBC flyweight champion February 23, 1969 – March 20, 1970 | Succeeded by Chartchai Chionoi |
| Preceded by Chartchai Chionoi | The Ring flyweight champion February 23, 1969 – March 20, 1970 | Succeeded by Chartchai Chionoi |
