= Walter McGowan =

Scottish boxer (1942-2016)

Walter McGowan MBE
Personal information
- Nationality: British
- Born: Walter Roderick McKay McGowan; 13 October 1942 Hamilton, South Lanarkshire, Scotland
- Died: 15 February 2016 (aged 73) Monklands Hospital, Airdrie, North Lanarkshire
- Weight: Flyweight

Boxing career
- Stance: Orthodox

Boxing record
- Total fights: 40
- Wins: 32
- Win by KO: 14
- Losses: 7
- Draws: 1

Walter McGowan, MBE (13 October 1942 – 15 February 2016), was a Scottish boxer born in Hamilton, South Lanarkshire. Is a former champion of the world, gaining universal recognition winning lineal + Ring flyweight world championships , EBU and BBBofC titles after defeating Salvatore Burruni in 1966.

He was the son of Thomas McGowan, who had boxed under the name of "Joe Gans".

He was a skillful boxer, who showed brilliant footwork and knew how to use the ring. However, he suffered throughout his career with cuts, often having fights stopped despite being ahead on points.

== Amateur career ==
McGowan won the 1961 Amateur Boxing Association British flyweight title, when boxing out of the Royal Albert ABC.

He suffered only two defeats in 124 amateur bouts.

== Professional career ==
He had his first professional fight in August 1961 when he fought George McDade at the Kelvin Hall, Glasgow, winning by a technical knockout in the third round.

He lost his third fight to Jackie Brown on points, but then continued to build up an impressive list of wins. In his tenth fight he fought Jackie Brown for the British and Commonwealth flyweight titles. The fight was in May 1963 at the Ice rink, Paisley, and McGowan won by a knockout in the twelfth round.

In September 1963, he defended his Commonwealth title against Kid Solomon from Jamaica. The fight was in Paisley, and McGowan won by a technical knockout in the ninth round.

In April 1964, he challenged for the European flyweight title, held by Italian, Salvatore Burruni. The fight was held in the Olympic Stadium, Rome, and McGowan suffered the second defeat of his career, losing on points over fifteen rounds.

In December 1965, he stepped up a weight and challenged for the European bantamweight title, held by Italian, Tommaso Galli. The fight was again in Rome and ended as a draw after fifteen rounds.

In June 1966, he again fought Salvatore Burruni, this time for the world flyweight championship (lineal, EBU, BBBofC and The Ring), which Burruni held. They met at the Empire Pool, Wembley, and McGowan won a fifteen-round points decision to gain that world title, despite sustaining a badly gashed eye in the seventh round. Cuts were to prove a major problem in his career.

In September 1966, he fought Alan Rudkin at the Empire Pool, for the British and Commonwealth bantamweight titles that he held. McGowan scored another fifteen-round points win, despite suffering a cut eye in the tenth round.

In December 1966, he attemptes to defend his world title against Chartchai Chionoi in Bangkok, Thailand. The Thai fighter won and took the title when McGowan suffered a badly cut nose in the ninth round, and the referee was forced to stop the fight.

The two boxers had a rematch at the Empire Pool in September 1967, but again the Thai boxer won and kept his title, when cuts to both McGowan's eyes and his forehead caused the referee to stop the fight in the seventh.

In McGowan's next fight, in May 1968, he lost his British and Commonwealth bantamweight titles to Alan Rudkin. The fight was at Belle Vue, Manchester and Rukin won by a fifteen-round points decision.

McGowan fought six more fights, all against foreign boxers, winning them all, before retiring. His last fight was in November 1969 against Domenico Antonio Chiloiro.

== Retirement ==
He became the first Scottish world-boxing champion to be so honoured when he was appointed Member of the Order of the British Empire (MBE) in the 1967 Queen's Birthday Honours List.

He was inducted into the Scottish Sports Hall of Fame in 2002, alongside the likes of Scottish boxing great Ken Buchanan.

== Later life and death ==
McGowan died at Monklands Hospital at Airdrie, North Lanarkshire on 15 February 2016. He had been in poor health in his later years and was living in a nursing home in Bellshill, North Lanarkshire.

== Professional boxing record ==
40 fights	32 wins	7 losses
By knockout	14	4
By decision	18	3
Draws	1	

No.	Result	Record	Opponent	Type	Round	Date	Location	Notes
40	Win	32–7–1	Domenico Chiloiro	PTS	8	Nov 11, 1969	Grosvenor House, Mayfair, London, England	
39	Win	31–7–1	Umberto Simbola	PTS	8	Aug 13, 1969	San Remo, Liguria, Italy	
38	Win	30–7–1	Michel Houdeau	TKO	4 (10)	Apr 28, 1969	Grosvenor House (World Sporting Club), Mayfair, London, England	
37	Win	29–7–1	Messaoud Boussaboua	PTS	8	Dec 17, 1968	Hotel Metropole Sporting Club, Brighton, Sussex, England	
36	Win	28–7–1	Marc Van Domme	TKO	7 (10)	Nov 26, 1968	Ulster Hall, Belfast, Northern Ireland	
35	Win	27–7–1	Gerard Macrez	TKO	4 (8)	Oct 23, 1968	Grosvenor House, Mayfair, London, England	
34	Loss	26–7–1	Alan Rudkin	PTS	15	May 13, 1968	King's Hall, Belle Vue, Manchester, Lancashire, England	Lost BBBofC British Area and Commonwealth bantamweight titles
33	Loss	26–6–1	Chartchai Chionoi	TKO	7 (15)	Sep 19, 1967	Empire Pool, Wembley, London, England	For WBC and The Ring flyweight titles
32	Win	26–5–1	Antoine Porcel	PTS	10	Jul 10, 1967	Grosvenor House (World Sporting Club), Mayfair, London, England	
31	Win	25–5–1	Giancarlo Centa	PTS	8	May 10, 1967	Civic Hall (Midlands Sporting Club), Solihull, West Midlands, England	
30	Win	24–5–1	Isao Miyashita	TKO	9 (15)	Mar 15, 1967	Grosvenor House (World Sporting Club), Mayfair, London, England	
29	Loss	23–5–1	Chartchai Chionoi	TKO	9 (15)	Dec 30, 1966	Kittikachorn Stadium, Bangkok, Thailand	Lost The Ring flyweight title
28	Win	23–4–1	Jose Bisbal	TKO	5 (10)	Nov 16, 1966	Grosvenor House (World Sporting Club), Mayfair, London, England	
27	Win	22–4–1	Alan Rudkin	PTS	15	Sep 6, 1966	Empire Pool, Wembley, London, England	Won vacant BBBofC British Area and Commonwealth bantamweight titles
26	Win	21–4–1	Salvatore Burruni	PTS	15	Jun 14, 1966	Empire Pool, Wembley, London, England	Won The Ring flyweight title
25	Win	20–4–1	Ernesto Miranda	PTS	8	Mar 28, 1966	Grosvenor House (World Sporting Club), Mayfair, London, England	
24	Win	19–4–1	Nevio Carbi	TKO	6 (10)	Jan 6, 1966	Grosvenor House (World Sporting Club), Mayfair, London, England	
23	Draw	18–4–1	Tommaso Galli	PTS	15	Dec 3, 1965	Palazzetto dello Sport, Roma, Lazio, Italy	For EBU bantamweight title
22	Loss	18–4	Ronnie Jones	TKO	6 (10)	Aug 20, 1965	Ice Rink, Paisley, Scotland	
21	Loss	18–3	José Medel	TKO	6 (10)	Jun 1, 1965	Empire Pool, Wembley, London, England	
20	Win	18–2	Benny Lee	PTS	10	Apr 23, 1965	Palazzetto dello Sport, Roma, Lazio, Italy	
19	Win	17–2	Felix Said Brami	PTS	10	Feb 23, 1965	Royal Albert Hall, Kensington, London, England	
18	Win	16–2	Mick Hussey	TKO	3 (10)	Jan 20, 1965	Midlands Sporting Club, Solihull, West Midlands, England	
17	Win	15–2	Luis Rodriguez	TKO	2 (10)	Nov 25, 1964	Midlands Sporting Club, Solihull, West Midlands, England	
16	Win	14–2	Natalio Jimenez	PTS	10	Sep 3, 1964	Ice Rink, Paisley, Scotland	
15	Loss	13–2	Salvatore Burruni	PTS	15	Apr 24, 1964	Stadio Olimpico, Roma, Lazio, Italy	For EBU flyweight title
14	Win	13–1	Risto Luukkonen	PTS	10	Mar 4, 1964	Ice Rink, Paisley, Scotland	
13	Win	12–1	Ric Magramo	PTS	10	Nov 28, 1963	Ice Rink, Paisley, Scotland	
12	Win	11–1	Killer Solomon	TKO	9 (15)	Sep 12, 1963	Ice Rink, Paisley, Scotland	Retained Commonwealth flyweight title
11	Win	10–1	Ray Perez	TKO	9 (10)	Jun 27, 1963	Ice Rink, Paisley, Scotland	
10	Win	9–1	Jackie Brown	KO	12 (15)	May 2, 1963	Ice Rink, Paisley, Scotland	Won BBBofC British Area and Commonwealth flyweight titles
9	Win	8–1	Bernard Jubert	PTS	8	Jan 31, 1963	Kelvin Hall, Glasgow, Scotland	
8	Win	7–1	Ray Jutras	TKO	6 (10)	Nov 14, 1962	Kelvin Hall, Glasgow, Scotland	
7	Win	6–1	René Libeer	TKO	6 (10)	Oct 16, 1962	Empire Pool, Wembley, London, England	
6	Win	5–1	Jacques Jacob	KO	6 (10)	Sep 20, 1962	Glasgow, Scotland	
5	Win	4–1	Danny Lee	PTS	8	Jun 14, 1962	Kelvin Hall, Glasgow, Scotland	
4	Win	3–1	Brian Bissmire	PTS	8	Dec 16, 1961	Kelvin Hall, Glasgow, Scotland	
3	Loss	2–1	Jackie Brown	PTS	8	Oct 25, 1961	Ice Rink, Paisley, Scotland	For BBBofC Scottish Area flyweight title
2	Win	2–0	Eddie Barraclough	PTS	8	Sep 22, 1961	Town Hall, Hamilton, Scotland	
1	Win	1–0	George McDade	TKO	3 (6)	Aug 9, 1961	Kelvin Hall, Glasgow, Scotland	

== See also ==
- List of flyweight boxing champions
- List of The Ring world champions
- List of British bantamweight boxing champions
- List of British flyweight boxing champions

Achievements
Preceded by Salvatore Burruni	Lineal Flyweight Champion; 14 June 1966 – 30 December 1966	Succeeded by Chartchai Chionoi
Preceded by Salvatore Burruni	World Flyweight Champion (recognized by EBU & BBBofC); 14 June 1966 – 30 December 1966	Succeeded by Chartchai Chionoi
Preceded by Salvatore Burruni	The Ring Flyweight Champion; 14 June 1966 – 30 December 1966	Succeeded by Chartchai Chionoi
