= Chartchai Chionoi =

Thai boxer

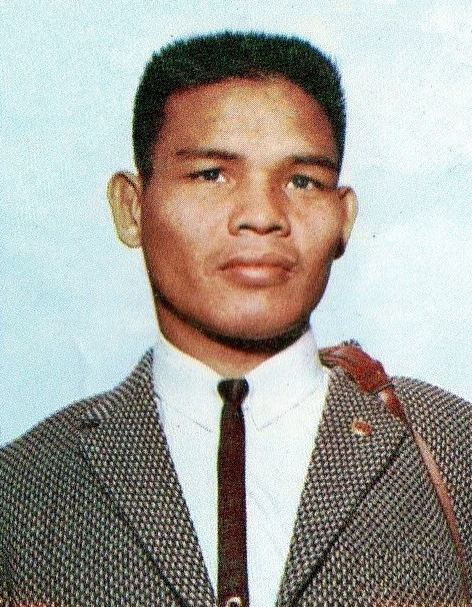
- Born: Naris Chionoi; October 10, 1942; Pathum Wan District, Bangkok, Thailand
- Died: January 21, 2018 (aged 75); Nopparat Rajathanee Hospital, Bangkok, Thailand; Pneumonia
- Native name: ชาติชาย เชี่ยวน้อย
- Nickname: Little Marciano of Asia; Marciano of Oriental
- Nationality: Thailand
- Height: 1.65 m (5 ft 5 in)
- Weight: 51 kg (112 lb; 8 st 0 lb)
- Reach: 166 cm (65 in)
- Stance: Orthodox
- Fighting out of: Pathum Thani Province, Thailand
- Years active: 1959–1975

Professional boxing record
- Total: 82
- Wins: 61
- By knockout: 36
- Losses: 18
- By knockout: 5
- Draws: 3

Other information
- Boxing record from BoxRec

Chartchai Chionoi (Thai: ชาติชาย เชี่ยวน้อย; RTGS: Chatchai Chiao-noi) a.k.a. Chartchai Laemfapha (Thai: ชาติชาย แหลมฟ้าผ่า; RTGS: Chatchai Laemfapha) or birth name Naris Chionoi (Thai: นริศ เชี่ยวน้อย; RTGS: Narit Chiao-noi; October 10, 1942 – January 21, 2018) was a Thai professional boxer, WBC world champion and WBA world champion in the flyweight division. He took the WBC World Flyweight Championship two successive times and the WBA Championship one time before finally relinquishing it.

== Early life ==
He was born into a poor family near Hua Lamphong quarter in Bangkok. Later, he moved with his family to settle down on the Thonburi side close to Wat Mai Phiren temple, where he started boxing for the first time in the event organized by the Royal Thai Navy.

== Professional career ==
Chartchai Chionoi was the second world boxing champion from Thailand, following his idol Pone Kingpetch. Unlike most Thai fighters, Chartchai was never involved in the Thai combat art Muay Thai.

Chartchai Chionoi turned pro on March 27, 1959, with a second-round knockout over Somsak Kritsanasuwan. He went 7-0-1 in his first eight pro fights, with a six-round draw against Sala Kampuch the only blemish. In his ninth professional fight, he lost a 6-round decision to Singtong Por Tor. He avenged this loss five years later with a 10-round decision against Por Tor.

Chionoi traveled to Japan for his next 11 fights, going 8 and 3 in the process. All three of his losses were by 10-round decisions, including a loss at the hands of the reigning OPBF Jr. Featherweight Champion Haruo Sakamoto. The other two fighters that defeated Chionoi during this time, Mitsunori Seki and Akira Oguchi, lost rematches with him.

After fighting in Japan for a year, Chionoi returned to his native Thailand for his next four fights, his only loss to Ernesto Miranda, whom he later defeated in a rematch.

On September 22, 1962, in Quezon City, Philippines, Chionoi met Primo Famiro for the vacant OPBF Flyweight Championship. Chionoi decisioned Famiro over twelve rounds to capture the vacant title. In July of the following year, Chionoi lost his first defense of the OPBF Flyweight Championship in a decision to Tsuyoshi Nakamura in Osaka, Japan. Nakamura made ten successful defenses of the OPBF Championship, before finally losing it in October 1969.

Chionoi went 19-2-1 over the next three years to earn his first world title shot. During that stretch, he won a 10-round decision over WBA and WBC Flyweight Champion Salvatore Burruni. Burruni had captured his world titles by defeating Chionoi's predecessor, Pone Kingpetch, in April 1965.

On December 30, 1966, Chionoi challenged the World Flyweight Champion Walter McGowan (lineal champion, recognized by EBU, BBBofC and The Ring). He stopped McGowan in the 9th round to capture the vacant WBC Flyweight Title, his first world title. Chionoi made four successful title defenses during this first reign as champion, including victories over McGowan in their rematch, and Efren Torres.

On February 23, 1969, Chionoi lost his title to Efren Torres in a rematch. The fight was stopped in the 8th round because Chionoi's left eye had swollen shut. He won two out of three fights to earn a rematch with Torres.

In March 1970 in front of over 40,000 of his countrymen, Chionoi won a 15-round unanimous decision over Torres in their rubber match, to once again claim the WBC Flyweight Championship. He won by scores of 148–142, 147-144 and 145–141. His second title reign was short lived.

In his first title defense, Chionoi was knocked out by Erbito Salavarria in the second round. Salavarria made several successful title defenses before losing the WBC Flyweight Championship; he later reigned as WBA Flyweight Champion as well.

Undeterred by losing the WBC Flyweight Championship for a second time, Chionoi went undefeated in his next six fights to secure a title shot against long time WBA Flyweight Champion Masao Ohba. On January 2, 1973, Chionoi faced Ohba in a very memorable fight. Chionoi put Ohba on the canvas early, but the champion rebounded and stopped Chionoi in the 12th round.

Ohba died in an auto accident 22 days after this fight. As a result, Chionoi was paired against Fritz Chervet in May 1973 for the vacant title. He knocked out Chervet in the 5th round to capture his third World Flyweight Championship.

Two successful defenses of his WBA Flyweight Championship followed, before Chionoi lost it on the scales in October 1974. Despite being stripped of the title, he still fought Susumu Hanagata in a fight that was for the vacant WBA Flyweight Title, at least on Hanagata's part. Hanagata stopped Chionoi in the 6th round to walk away the WBA Flyweight Champion.

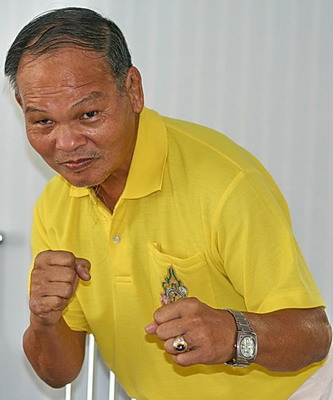
Chartchai Chionoi after retirement

After losing his third World title, Chionoi won a ten-round decision over Willie Asuncion, then lost by knockout to Rodolfo Francis in August 1975. He retired from boxing after this loss, finishing with a career record of 61-18-3 (36).

== Retirement ==
Chionoi lived a comfortable life in retirement with his wife of over 45 years, spending as much time as possible with their four children. Despite some lasting ill effects from his years as a boxer, he had fond memories of his career, and no regrets.

He had lasting effects from Parkinson's disease, including come paralysis, a by-product of his boxing career.

He died on the evening of January 21, 2018, at 75 years old.

== Professional boxing record ==
82 fights	61 wins	18 losses
By knockout	36	5
By decision	25	13
Draws	3	

No.	Result	Record	Opponent	Type	Round(s)	Date	Location	Notes
82	Loss	61–18–3	Rodolfo Francis	TKO	6 (10)	Aug 16, 1975	Gimnasio Nuevo Panama, Panama City, Panama	
81	Win	61–17–3	Willie Asuncion	PTS	10	Apr 11, 1975	Bangkok, Thailand	
80	Loss	60–17–3	Susumu Hanagata	KO	6 (15)	Oct 18, 1974	Bunka Gym, Yokohama, Kanagawa, Japan	WBA flyweight title at stake only for Hanagata after Chionoi missed weight
79	Win	60–16–3	Fritz Chervet	SD	15	Apr 27, 1974	Hallenstadion, Zurich, Switzerland	Retained WBA flyweight title
78	Loss	59–16–3	Fernando Cabanela	UD	10	Jan 29, 1974	Honolulu International Center, Honolulu, Hawaii, U.S.	
77	Win	59–15–3	Susumu Hanagata	UD	15	Oct 27, 1973	Hua Mark Indoor Stadium, Bangkok, Thailand	Retained WBA flyweight title
76	Win	58–15–3	Fritz Chervet	RTD	4 (15)	May 17, 1973	National Stadium Gymnasium, Bangkok, Thailand	Won vacant WBA flyweight title
75	Loss	57–15–3	Masao Oba	KO	12 (15)	Jan 2, 1973	Nihon University Auditorium, Tokyo, Japan	For WBA flyweight title
74	Win	57–14–3	Esteban Rangel	KO	2 (10)	Oct 18, 1972	Bangkok, Thailand	
73	Win	56–14–3	Shiomi Tanaka	PTS	10	Jul 5, 1972	Bangkok, Thailand	
72	Win	55–14–3	Edmundo Ejandra	TKO	9 (10)	Apr 5, 1972	Rajadamnern Stadium, Bangkok, Thailand	
71	Win	54–14–3	Kenji Endo	PTS	10	Jan 31, 1972	Bangkok, Thailand	
70	Win	53–14–3	Berkrerk Chartvanchai	PTS	10	Nov 15, 1971	Bangkok, Thailand	WBA flyweight title eliminator
69	Draw	52–14–3	Snappy Asano	PTS	10	Apr 19, 1971	Bangkok, Thailand	
68	Loss	52–14–2	Erbito Salavarria	TKO	2 (15)	Dec 7, 1970	Army Sports Stadium, Bangkok, Thailand	Lost WBC and The Ring flyweight titles
67	Win	52–13–2	Al Diaz	PTS	10	Jun 19, 1970	Bangkok, Thailand	
66	Win	51–13–2	Efren Torres	UD	15	Mar 20, 1970	National Stadium Gymnasium, Bangkok, Thailand	Won WBC and The Ring flyweight titles
65	Win	50–13–2	Ely Axinto	KO	6 (10)	Jan 13, 1970	Bangkok, Thailand	
64	Win	49–13–2	Rudy Alarcon	KO	9 (10)	Sep 7, 1969	Bangkok, Thailand	
63	Loss	48–13–2	Willy Del Prado	UD	10	Jun 24, 1969	Bangkok, Thailand	
62	Loss	48–12–2	Efren Torres	TKO	8 (15)	Feb 23, 1969	El Toreo de Cuatro Caminos, Mexico City, Distrito Federal, Mexico	Lost WBC and The Ring flyweight titles
61	Win	48–11–2	Bernabe Villacampo	UD	15	Nov 10, 1968	Carusathiars Stadium, Bangkok, Thailand	Retained The Ring flyweight title; Won the vacant WBC flyweight title
60	Loss	47–11–2	Eduardo Mojica	UD	10	Jun 8, 1968	Estadio Nacional, Managua, Nicaragua	
59	Win	47–10–2	Efren Torres	TKO	13 (15)	Jan 28, 1968	El Toreo de Cuatro Caminos, Mexico City, Distrito Federal, Mexico	Retained The Ring flyweight title
58	Win	46–10–2	Mimoun Ben Ali	KO	4 (10)	Dec 8, 1967	Lumpinee Boxing Stadium, Bangkok, Thailand	
57	Win	45–10–2	Walter McGowan	TKO	7 (15)	Sep 19, 1967	Empire Pool, Wembley, London, England, U.K.	Retained The Ring flyweight title
56	Win	44–10–2	Puntip Keosuriya	KO	3 (15)	Jul 26, 1967	Kittikachorn Stadium, Bangkok, Thailand	Retained The Ring flyweight title
55	Win	43–10–2	Baby Lorona	UD	10	Feb 28, 1967	Lumpinee Boxing Stadium, Bangkok, Thailand	
54	Win	42–10–2	Bonny Boromeo	TKO	4 (10)	Feb 3, 1967	Phitsanulok, Thailand	
53	Win	41–10–2	Walter McGowan	TKO	9 (15)	Dec 30, 1966	Kittikachorn Stadium, Bangkok, Thailand	Won The Ring flyweight title
52	Win	40–10–2	Terry Go	KO	6 (10)	Nov 15, 1966	Bangkok, Thailand	
51	Win	39–10–2	Saknoi Sor Kosum	KO	1 (10)	Aug 16, 1966	Bangkok, Thailand	
50	Win	38–10–2	Chaythong Singchiopleong	KO	3 (10)	May 21, 1966	Bangkok, Thailand	
49	Win	37–10–2	Clever Luna	KO	4 (10)	Apr 10, 1966	Chiang Mai, Thailand	
48	Win	36–10–2	Ernesto Miranda	PTS	10	Mar 15, 1966	Bangkok, Thailand	
47	Win	35–10–2	Salvatore Burruni	UD	10	Feb 8, 1966	Bangkok, Thailand	
46	Win	34–10–2	Pornchai Poprai ngam	KO	1 (10)	Jan 7, 1966	Bangkok, Thailand	
45	Win	33–10–2	Michel Lamora	PTS	10	Sep 28, 1965	Bangkok, Thailand	
44	Loss	32–10–2	Hajime Taroura	PTS	10	Aug 22, 1965	Tokyo, Japan	
43	Win	32–9–2	Cherry Montano	KO	2 (?)	Jul 8, 1965	Manila, Metro Manila, Philippines	
42	Win	31–9–2	Cherry Montano	KO	2 (10)	Jun 10, 1965	Manila, Metro Manila, Philippines	
41	Win	30–9–2	Rudy Villagonza	KO	3 (10)	May 12, 1965	Manila, Metro Manila, Philippines	
40	Win	29–9–2	Rudy Villagonza	TKO	4 (10)	Apr 24, 1965	Araneta Coliseum, Barangay Cubao, Quezon City, Metro Manila, Philippines	
39	Win	28–9–2	Singtong Por Tor	PTS	10	Feb 2, 1965	Bangkok, Thailand	
38	Win	27–9–2	Anandech Sithhiran	PTS	10	Sep 12, 1964	Bangkok, Thailand	
37	Loss	26–9–2	Bernardo Caraballo	PTS	10	Jul 12, 1964	Araneta Coliseum, Barangay Cubao, Quezon City, Metro Manila, Philippines	
36	Win	26–8–2	Little Paramount	KO	2 (10)	Jun 10, 1964	Araneta Coliseum, Barangay Cubao, Quezon City, Metro Manila, Philippines	
35	Win	25–8–2	Rudy Villagonza	PTS	10	Feb 8, 1964	Rizal Memorial Coliseum, Manila, Metro Manila, Philippines	
34	Win	24–8–2	Pat Gonzales	KO	7 (10)	Jan 7, 1964	Cebu, Philippines	
33	Win	23–8–2	Leo Macamlinton	PTS	10	Nov 21, 1963	Bangkok, Thailand	
32	Draw	22–8–2	Tetsuya Yamagami	PTS	10	Aug 28, 1963	Tokyo, Japan	
31	Win	22–8–1	Tadao Kawamura	PTS	10	Jul 26, 1963	Kokura Gym, Kitakyushu, Fukuoka, Japan	
30	Loss	21–8–1	Takeshi Nakamura	PTS	12	Jul 7, 1963	Osaka, Osaka, Japan	Lost OPBF flyweight title
29	Loss	21–7–1	Takeshi Nakamura	PTS	10	Jun 7, 1963	Tokyo, Japan	
28	Win	21–6–1	Seisaku Saito	TKO	8 (10)	Feb 19, 1963	Tokyo, Japan	
27	Loss	20–6–1	Hiroyuki Ebihara	UD	12	Dec 31, 1962	Yasaka Hall, Kyoto, Kyoto, Japan	
26	Win	20–5–1	Baby Espinosa	KO	6 (10)	Oct 4, 1962	Cebu, Philippines	
25	Win	19–5–1	Primo Famiro	PTS	12	Sep 22, 1962	Araneta Coliseum, Barangay Cubao, Quezon City, Metro Manila, Philippines	Won vacant OPBF flyweight title
24	Loss	18–5–1	Ernesto Miranda	PTS	10	Jul 12, 1962	Bangkok, Thailand	
23	Win	18–4–1	Mitsunori Seki	MD	10	Apr 24, 1962	Bangkok, Thailand	
22	Win	17–4–1	Kyo Noguchi	PTS	10	Dec 9, 1961	Bangkok, Thailand	
21	Win	16–4–1	Akira Oguchi	TKO	5 (10)	Sep 28, 1961	Bangkok, Thailand	
20	Win	15–4–1	Masao Ogawa	RTD	5 (10)	Sep 7, 1961	Nakajima Sports Center, Sapporo, Hokkaido, Japan	
19	Loss	14–4–1	Haruo Sakamoto	PTS	10	Aug 17, 1961	Tokyo, Japan	
18	Win	14–3–1	Masakatsu Kuroki	RTD	7 (10)	Jul 21, 1961	Abeno Gymnasium, Osaka, Osaka, Japan	
17	Loss	13–3–1	Akira Oguchi	PTS	10	Jun 8, 1961	Tokyo, Japan	
16	Win	13–2–1	Shotaro Aida	KO	2 (10)	May 15, 1961	Tokyo, Japan	
15	Win	12–2–1	Kazuyoshi Amada	TKO	6 (10)	Apr 19, 1961	Tokyo, Japan	
14	Loss	11–2–1	Mitsunori Seki	UD	10	Jan 4, 1961	Nihon University Auditorium, Tokyo, Japan	
13	Win	11–1–1	Masao Ogawa	PTS	10	Dec 4, 1960	Tokyo, Japan	
12	Win	10–1–1	Yoshikatsu Furukawa	PTS	8	Oct 19, 1960	Tokyo, Japan	
11	Win	9–1–1	Atsuto Fukumoto	TKO	2 (10)	Sep 29, 1960	Tokyo, Japan	
10	Win	8–1–1	Masanobu Kambayashi	KO	8 (10)	Sep 2, 1960	Tokyo, Japan	
9	Loss	7–1–1	Singtong Por Tor	PTS	6	Aug 1, 1960	Bangkok, Thailand	
8	Win	7–0–1	Suparit Benjamasit	KO	4 (6)	Jun 4, 1960	Bangkok, Thailand	
7	Win	6–0–1	Willy Lertrit	KO	2 (6)	Feb 2, 1960	Bangkok, Thailand	
6	Win	5–0–1	Wan Wanpho	PTS	6	Dec 29, 1959	Phnom Penh, Cambodia	
5	Win	4–0–1	Yu Samang	KO	2 (6)	Nov 1, 1959	Phnom Penh, Cambodia	
4	Win	3–0–1	Opas Rorsorpor	PTS	6	Sep 27, 1959	Bangkok, Thailand	
3	Draw	2–0–1	Sala Kampuch	PTS	6	May 31, 1959	Phnom Penh, Cambodia	
2	Win	2–0	Surin Praromdee	KO	2 (?)	Apr 8, 1959	Bangkok, Thailand	
1	Win	1–0	Somsak Kritsanasuwan	KO	2 (6)	Mar 27, 1959	Ratchaburi, Thailand	

== See also ==
- List of flyweight boxing champions
- List of WBC world champions

Sporting positions
World boxing titles
Preceded by Walter McGowan	The Ring flyweight champion December 30, 1966 – February 23, 1969	Succeeded by Efren Torres
Vacant Title last held by Horacio Accavallo	WBC flyweight champion November 10, 1968 – February 23, 1969	Succeeded by Efren Torres
Preceded by Efren Torres	WBC flyweight champion March 20, 1970 – December 7, 1970	Succeeded by Erbito Salavarria
Preceded by Efren Torres	The Ring flyweight champion March 20, 1970 – December 7, 1970	Succeeded by Erbito Salavarria
Vacant Title last held by Masao Ohba	WBA flyweight champion May 17, 1973 – October 18, 1974	Succeeded by Susumu Hanagata
