= Erbito Salavarria =

Filipino boxer

Erbito C. Salavarria
Personal information
- Nationality: Filipino
- Born: Erbito C. Salavarria; January 20, 1946 (age 80) Santa Cruz, Manila, Philippines
- Weight: Flyweight

Boxing career
- Stance: Orthodox

Boxing record
- Total fights: 54
- Wins: 40
- Win by KO: 11
- Losses: 11
- Draws: 3
- No contests: 0

Erbito Salavarria (born January 20, 1946) is a retired professional boxer from the Philippines and a former WBC, WBA and Lineal Flyweight Champion.

== Biography ==
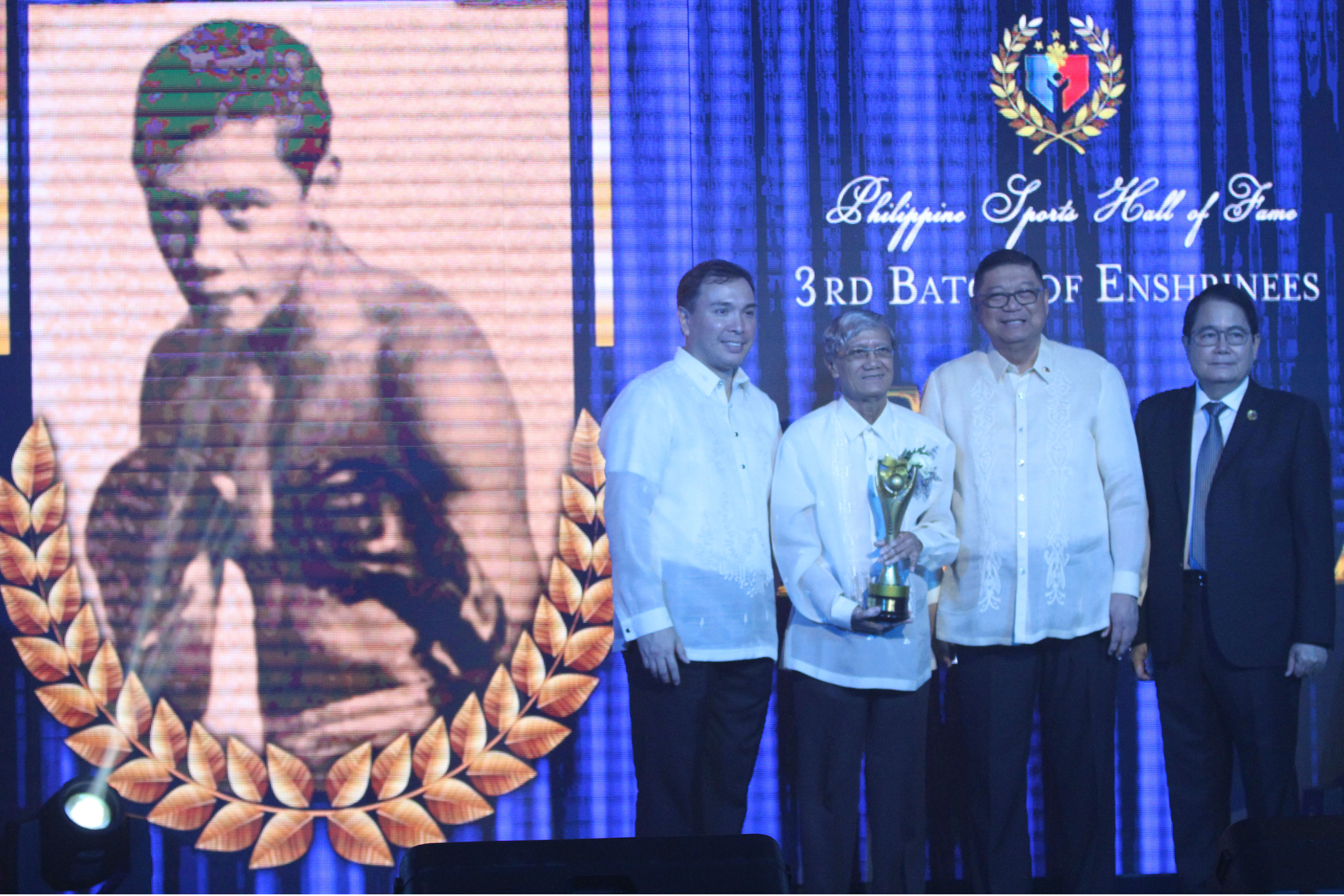
Salavarria's induction to the PSC Hall of Fame.

Salavarria made his professional debut in 1963. He captured the WBC and lineal flyweight title with a TKO win over Chartchai Chionoi in 1970. He lost the WBC title after being stripped following a draw against Betulio González in 1971.

In 1975, Salavarria captured the WBA flyweight title with a split decision win over Susumu Hanagata. He lost the belt in his first defense to Alfonso Lopez in 1976. He retired in 1978 after a comeback loss.

== Professional boxing record ==
54 fights	40 wins	11 losses
By knockout	11	3
By decision	29	8
Draws	3	

No.	Result	Record	Opponent	Type	Round(s), time	Date	Age	Location	Notes
54	Loss	40–11–3	Netrnoi Sor Vorasingh	KO	4 (?)	Dec 3, 1976	30 years, 318 days	Bangkok, Thailand	
53	Loss	40–10–3	Alfonso Lopez	TKO	15 (15), 0:33	Feb 27, 1976	30 years, 38 days	Araneta Coliseum, Barangay Cubao, Quezon City, Metro Manila, Philippines	Lost WBA flyweight title
52	Win	40–9–3	Susumu Hanagata	SD	15	Oct 7, 1975	29 years, 260 days	Bunka Gym, Yokohama, Kanagawa, Japan	Retained WBA flyweight title
51	Loss	39–9–3	Alberto Morales	SD	10	May 17, 1975	29 years, 117 days	Sports Arena, Los Angeles, California, U.S.	
50	Win	39–8–3	Susumu Hanagata	SD	15	Apr 1, 1975	29 years, 71 days	Prefectural Gymnasium, Toyama, Japan	Won WBA flyweight title
49	Win	38–8–3	Issei Sugamoto	RTD	4 (10), 3:00	Nov 15, 1973	28 years, 299 days	Rizal Memorial Coliseum, Manila, Metro Manila, Philippines	
48	Loss	37–8–3	Alfonso Lopez	UD	10	Jun 29, 1973	28 years, 160 days	Gimnasio Nuevo Panama, Panama City, Panama	
47	Win	37–7–3	Vicente Pool	TKO	6 (10)	Jun 8, 1973	28 years, 139 days	Merida, Yucatán, Mexico	
46	Win	36–7–3	Enrique Torres	UD	12	Nov 6, 1973	27 years, 290 days	Honolulu International Center, Honolulu, Hawaii, U.S.	
45	Win	35–7–3	Fortunato Hernandez	TKO	2 (10), 1:30	Sep 18, 1973	27 years, 241 days	Honolulu International Center, Honolulu, Hawaii, U.S.	
44	Loss	34–7–3	Venice Borkhorsor	UD	15	Feb 9, 1973	27 years, 20 days	Kittikachorn Stadium, Bangkok, Thailand	Lost The Ring flyweight titles; For WBC flyweight title
43	Win	34–6–3	Dong Ki Cho	UD	12	Aug 5, 1972	26 years, 198 days	CYO Gym, Davao City, Davao del Sur, Philippines	Retained OPBF and The Ring flyweight titles
42	Draw	33–6–3	Betulio González	SD	15	Nov 20, 1971	25 years, 304 days	Luis Aparicio Stadium, Maracaibo, Colombia	Retained WBC and The Ring flyweight titles
41	Win	33–6–2	Natalio Jimenez	UD	12	Sep 11, 1971	25 years, 234 days	Araneta Coliseum, Barangay Cubao, Quezon City, Metro Manila, Philippines	
40	Loss	32–6–2	Lorenzo Gutierrez	PTS	10	Jun 4, 1971	25 years, 135 days	Forum, Inglewood, California, U.S.	
39	Win	32–5–2	Susumu Hanagata	UD	15	Apr 30, 1971	25 years, 100 days	Araneta Coliseum, Barangay Cubao, Quezon City, Metro Manila, Philippines	Retained WBC and The Ring flyweight titles
38	Win	31–5–2	Harry Hayes	UD	12	Feb 20, 1971	25 years, 31 days	Araneta Coliseum, Barangay Cubao, Quezon City, Metro Manila, Philippines	
37	Win	30–5–2	Chartchai Chionoi	TKO	2 (15), 1:48	Dec 7, 1970	24 years, 321 days	Army Sports Stadium, Bangkok, Thailand	Won WBC and The Ring flyweight titles
36	Win	29–5–2	Berkrerk Chartvanchai	UD	10	Jul 25, 1970	24 years, 186 days	Araneta Coliseum, Barangay Cubao, Quezon City, Metro Manila, Philippines	
35	Win	28–5–2	Wittaya Pleonjit	UD	12	Jun 20, 1970	24 years, 151 days	Araneta Coliseum, Barangay Cubao, Quezon City, Metro Manila, Philippines	Retained OPBF flyweight title
34	Win	27–5–2	Shigeru Taremizu	KO	2 (12), 0:29	Mar 4, 1970	24 years, 43 days	Tokyo, Japan	Retained OPBF flyweight title
33	Win	26–5–2	Takeshi Nakamura	TKO	12 (12), 1:35	Oct 18, 1969	23 years, 271 days	Araneta Coliseum, Barangay Cubao, Quezon City, Metro Manila, Philippines	Won OPBF flyweight title
32	Win	25–5–2	Al Diaz	UD	12	May 17, 1969	23 years, 117 days	Araneta Coliseum, Barangay Cubao, Quezon City, Metro Manila, Philippines	Retained PG&A flyweight title
31	Win	24–5–2	Sakdinoi ETO	TKO	9 (10)	Apr 26, 1969	23 years, 96 days	Araneta Coliseum, Barangay Cubao, Quezon City, Metro Manila, Philippines	
30	Win	23–5–2	Yoshiaki Matsumoto	TKO	4 (12)	Feb 15, 1969	23 years, 26 days	Araneta Coliseum, Barangay Cubao, Quezon City, Metro Manila, Philippines	
29	Draw	22–5–2	Yoshiaki Matsumoto	PTS	10	Nov 4, 1968	22 years, 289 days	Korakuen Hall, Tokyo, Japan	
28	Win	22–5–1	Speedy Hayase	UD	10	Oct 7, 1968	22 years, 261 days	Korakuen Hall, Tokyo, Japan	
27	Win	21–5–1	Ric Magramo	MD	12	Aug 17, 1968	22 years, 210 days	Araneta Coliseum, Barangay Cubao, Quezon City, Metro Manila, Philippines	Won PG&A flyweight title
26	Win	20–5–1	Speedy Hayase	UD	10	May 16, 1968	22 years, 117 days	Araneta Coliseum, Barangay Cubao, Quezon City, Metro Manila, Philippines	
25	Loss	19–5–1	Takeshi Nakamura	SD	12	Dec 20, 1967	21 years, 334 days	Japan	For OBPF flyweight title
24	Loss	19–4–1	Ric Magramo	SD	12	Oct 14, 1967	21 years, 267 days	Araneta Coliseum, Barangay Cubao, Quezon City, Metro Manila, Philippines	Lost PG&A flyweight title
23	Win	19–3–1	Dong Ki Cho	UD	10	Aug 12, 1967	21 years, 204 days	Araneta Coliseum, Barangay Cubao, Quezon City, Metro Manila, Philippines	
22	Win	18–3–1	Ric Magramo	SD	12	May 13, 1967	21 years, 113 days	Rizal Memorial Coliseum, Manila, Philippines	Won PG&A flyweight title
21	Loss	17–3–1	Ric Magramo	UD	12	Nov 18, 1966	20 years, 302 days	Rizal Memorial Coliseum, Manila, Philippines	For PG&A flyweight title
20	Win	17–2–1	Tom Rico	UD	10	Oct 8, 1966	20 years, 261 days	Besa Boxing Arena - Plaza Lawton, Manila, Philippines	
19	Win	16–2–1	Cezar Soliman	TKO	9 (10)	Jul 22, 1966	20 years, 183 days	Rizal Memorial Coliseum, Manila, Philippines	
18	Loss	15–2–1	Al Diaz	KO	9 (10)	Apr 9, 1966	20 years, 79 days	Rizal Memorial Coliseum, Manila, Philippines	
17	Win	15–1–1	Primo Famiro	SD	10	Feb 19, 1966	20 years, 30 days	Araneta Coliseum, Barangay Cubao, Quezon City, Philippines	
16	Win	14–1–1	Henry Acido	SD	10	Jan 8, 1966	19 years, 353 days	Rizal Memorial Coliseum, Manila, Philippines	
15	Win	13–1–1	Manuelo Balaba	MD	10	Oct 15, 1965	19 years, 268 days	Rizal Memorial Coliseum, Manila, Philippines	
14	Win	12–1–1	Rudy Billones	MD	10	Aug 20, 1965	19 years, 212 days	Rizal Memorial Coliseum, Manila, Philippines	
13	Win	11–1–1	Baby Castro	UD	10	Jul 3, 1965	19 years, 164 days	Rizal Memorial Coliseum, Manila, Philippines	
12	Win	10–1–1	Speedy Castro	UD	8	Apr 24, 1965	19 years, 95 days	Araneta Coliseum, Barangay Cubao, Quezon City, Philippines	
11	Win	9–1–1	Joe Cagulada	TKO	3 (8)	Dec 5, 1964	18 years, 320 days	Rizal Memorial Coliseum, Manila, Philippines	
10	Loss	8–1–1	Johnny Bulawan	SD	8	Oct 28, 1964	18 years, 282 days	Besa Boxing Arena - Plaza Lawton, Manila, Philippines	
9	Draw	8–0–1	Ruben Dingal	PTS	6	Aug 21, 1964	18 years, 214 days	Rizal Memorial Coliseum, Manila, Philippines	
8	Win	8–0	Jessie Fernandez	UD	6	Jul 31, 1964	18 years, 193 days	ABS Studio - TV Fistorama, Pasay City, Philippines	
7	Win	7–0	Speedy Castro	UD	6	May 23, 1964	18 years, 124 days	Araneta Coliseum, Barangay Cubao, Quezon City, Philippines	
6	Win	6–0	Junio Urbina Jr.	UD	4	Apr 18, 1964	18 years, 89 days	Araneta Coliseum, Barangay Cubao, Quezon City, Philippines	
5	Win	5–0	Mar Anacay	UD	4	Feb 15, 1964	18 years, 26 days	Rizal Memorial Sports Complex, Manila, Philippines	
4	Win	4–0	Adolfo Corpuz	UD	4	Dec 27, 1971	17 years, 341 days	DZRH TV on Taft Avenue, Manila, Philippines	
3	Win	3–0	Fil Bartolome	UD	4	Dec 7, 1971	17 years, 321 days	Besa Boxing Arena - Plaza Lawton, Manila, Philippines	
2	Win	2–0	Pablito Seldon	TKO	4 (4)	Sep 14, 1971	17 years, 237 days	Besa Boxing Arena - Plaza Lawton, Manila, Philippines	
1	Win	1–0	Johnny Bulawan	PTS	4	Jun 15, 1971	17 years, 146 days	Rizal Memorial Sports Complex, Manila, Philippines	

== See also ==
- List of flyweight boxing champions
- List of WBC world champions
- List of WBA world champions

Achievements
Preceded by Chartchai Chionoi	Lineal Flyweight Champion; 1970 Dec 7 – 1973 Feb 9	Succeeded by Venice Borkhorsor
Preceded by Chartchai Chionoi	WBC Flyweight Champion; 1970 Dec 7 – 1971 Dec 29; Stripped	Succeeded by Betulio González
Preceded by Susumu Hanagata	WBA Flyweight Champion; 1975 Apr 1 – 1976 Feb 27	Succeeded by Alfonso Lopez
