= Susumu Hanagata =

Japanese boxer

Personal information
- Nationality: Japanese
- Born: 花形進; January 21, 1947 (age 79) Yokohama, Japan
- Height: 5 ft 3 1/2 in (161 cm)
- Weight: Flyweight

Boxing career
- Reach: 160 cm (63 in)
- Stance: orthodox

Boxing record
- Total fights: 65
- Wins: 41
- Win by KO: 8
- Losses: 15
- Draws: 9

Susumu Hanagata (花形進 Hanagata Susumu, born January 21, 1947) is a Japanese former professional boxer in the flyweight division. Hanagata won the WBA flyweight championship in 1974 when he defeated Thai champion Chartchai Chionoi via a sixth-round technical knockout.

== Professional boxing record ==
65 fights	41 wins	15 losses
By knockout	7	1
By decision	34	14
Draws	9	

No.	Result	Record	Opponent	Type	Round, time	Date	Location	Notes
65	Loss	41–15–9	Miguel Canto	UD	15	15 May 1976	Parque Carta Clara, Mérida, Mexico	For WBC flyweight title
64	Loss	41–14–9	Erbito Salavarria	SD	15	7 Oct 1975	Bunka Gym, Yokohama, Japan	For WBA flyweight title
63	Loss	41–13–9	Erbito Salavarria	SD	15	1 Apr 1975	City Gymnasium, Toyama, Japan	Lost WBA flyweight title
62	Win	41–12–9	Chartchai Chionoi	TKO	6 (15)	18 Oct 1974	Bunka Gym, Yokohama, Japan	Won vacant WBA flyweight title
61	Win	40–12–9	Ernie Timbal	KO	4	5 Sep 1974	City Gymnasium, Toyama, Japan	
60	Win	39–12–9	Rudy Billones	KO	3 (10)	19 Mar 1974	Korakuen Hall, Tokyo, Japan	
59	Loss	38–12–9	Chartchai Chionoi	UD	15	27 Oct 1973	Hua Mark Indoor Stadium, Bangkok, Thailand	For WBA flyweight title
58	Win	38–11–9	Mikio Nakada	UD	10	17 Jun 1973	City Gymnasium, Toyama, Japan	Retained Japanese flyweight title
57	Win	37–11–9	Daniel Pilar	PTS	10	27 Apr 1973	Hagåtña, Guam	
56	Win	36–11–9	Osamu Haba	UD	10	6 Oct 1972	Bunka Gym, Yokohama, Japan	Won Japanese flyweight title
55	Loss	35–11–9	Osamu Haba	KO	8 (10)	3 Jul 1972	Bunka Gym, Yokohama, Japan	Lost Japanese flyweight title
54	Win	35–10–9	Takeo Sukegawa	KO	2	18 May 1972	Korakuen Hall, Tokyo, Japan	
53	Loss	34–10–9	Masao Oba	MD	15	4 Mar 1972	Nihon University Auditorium, Tokyo, Japan	For WBA flyweight title
52	Win	34–9–9	Takeo Sukegawa	UD	10	6 Feb 1972	City Gymnasium, Ōdate, Japan	
51	Win	33–9–9	Mikio Nakada	SD	10	9 Dec 1971	Bunka Gym, Yokohama, Japan	
50	Win	32–9–9	Seiichi Watanuki	SD	10	23 Sep 1971	Bunka Gym, Yokohama, Japan	Retained Japanese flyweight title
49	Loss	31–9–9	Erbito Salavarria	UD	15	30 Apr 1971	Araneta Coliseum, Quezon City, Philippines	For WBC flyweight title
48	Win	31–8–9	Tatsuro Uchida	UD	10	27 Jan 1971	Bunka Gym, Yokohama, Japan	
47	Win	30–8–9	Shigeru Taremizu	UD	10	25 Nov 1970	Korakuen Hall, Tokyo, Japan	Retained Japanese flyweight title
46	Win	29–8–9	Fernando Cabanela	TD	7 (10), 2:43	24 May 1970	Korakuen Hall, Tokyo, Japan	WBC flyweight title eliminator
45	Win	28–8–9	Seiichi Watanuki	UD	10	12 Apr 1970	Bunka Gym, Yokohama, Japan	Retained Japanese flyweight title
44	Win	27–8–9	Eduardo Mojica	UD	10	11 Jan 1970	Korakuen Hall, Tokyo, Japan	
43	Loss	26–8–9	Efren Torres	UD	15	28 Nov 1969	Plaza de Toros Nuevo Progreso, Guadalajara, Mexico	For WBC flyweight title
42	Win	26–7–9	Roger Moreno	KO	4 (10)	8 Sep 1969	Korakuen Hall, Tokyo, Japan	
41	Win	25–7–9	Speedy Hayase	UD	10	4 Aug 1969	Korakuen Hall, Tokyo, Japan	Retained Japanese flyweight title
40	Win	24–7–9	Efren Torres	UD	10	19 Jun 1969	Olympic Auditorium, Los Angeles, United States	
39	Win	23–7–9	Speedy Hayase	UD	10	7 Apr 1969	Korakuen Hall, Tokyo, Japan	Won Japanese flyweight title
38	Win	22–7–9	Terry Go	PTS	10	9 Dec 1968	Korakuen Hall, Tokyo, Japan	
37	Win	21–7–9	Shoji Wada	PTS	10	21 Oct 1968	Korakuen Hall, Tokyo, Japan	
36	Win	20–7–9	Masao Oba	PTS	10	2 Sep 1968	Korakuen Hall, Tokyo, Japan	
35	Win	19–7–9	Mitsuyoshi Iritsuki	KO	4	3 Aug 1968	City Gymnasium, Kawasaki, Japan	
34	Win	18–7–9	Hisashi Orii	PTS	8	26 May 1968	Korakuen Hall, Tokyo, Japan	
33	Win	17–7–9	Kenji Ashikaga	PTS	10	29 Apr 1968	Korakuen Hall, Tokyo, Japan	
32	Win	16–7–9	Shinzaburo Kaneko	KO	8 (10)	25 Jan 1968	Korakuen Hall, Tokyo, Japan	
31	Win	15–7–9	Katsuji Ishioka	PTS	8	18 Sep 1967	Korakuen Hall, Tokyo, Japan	
30	Draw	14–7–9	Yoshiaki Matsumoto	PTS	8	17 Jul 1967	Park Arena, Yokohama, Japan	
29	Loss	14–7–8	Yoshiaki Matsumoto	PTS	8	18 Jun 1967	Korakuen Hall, Tokyo, Japan	
28	Win	14–6–8	Kyoichi Yamazaki	PTS	6	18 May 1967	Korakuen Hall, Tokyo, Japan	
27	Draw	13–6–8	Kenji Ashikaga	PTS	8	30 Mar 1967	Korakuen Hall, Tokyo, Japan	
26	Win	13–6–7	Tetsuo Yamauchi	PTS	6	8 Jan 1967	Korakuen Hall, Tokyo, Japan	
25	Loss	12–6–7	Kenji Ashikaga	PTS	6	14 Nov 1966	Korakuen Hall, Tokyo, Japan	
24	Win	12–5–7	Katsuyuki Kawabata	PTS	6	23 Oct 1966	Korakuen Hall, Tokyo, Japan	
23	Draw	11–5–7	Katsuyoshi Nakajima	PTS	6	11 Sep 1966	Korakuen Hall, Tokyo, Japan	
22	Win	11–5–6	Michio Wakayama	PTS	6	18 Aug 1966	Ito Tourist Center, Itō, Japan	
21	Win	10–5–6	Kunio Ishida	PTS	6	30 Jun 1966	Korakuen Hall, Tokyo, Japan	
20	Win	9–5–6	Goro Kawasaki	PTS	6	15 May 1966	Park Arena, Yokohama, Japan	
19	Draw	8–5–6	Katsuji Ishioka	PTS	6	11 Mar 1966	Bunka Gym, Yokohama, Japan	
18	Loss	8–5–5	Eikichi Harayama	PTS	6	3 Feb 1966	Korakuen Hall, Tokyo, Japan	
17	Draw	8–4–5	Kenji Ashikaga	PTS	6	10 Jan 1966	Korakuen Hall, Tokyo, Japan	
16	Draw	8–4–4	Haruo Tashiro	PTS	4	5 Dec 1965	Park Arena, Yokohama, Japan	
15	Loss	8–4–3	Shigeru Taremizu	PTS	4	9 Sep 1965	Korakuen Hall, Tokyo, Japan	
14	Draw	8–3–3	Yoichi Nagumo	TD	3 (4)	22 Aug 1965	Korakuen Pingpong Center, Tokyo, Japan	
13	Win	8–3–2	Shigeru Sawazaki	PTS	4	13 Jun 1965	Korakuen Hall, Tokyo, Japan	
12	Win	7–3–2	Kenji Fukuyama	PTS	4	30 May 1965	Korakuen Hall, Tokyo, Japan	
11	Win	6–3–2	Hideo Isono	PTS	4	28 Feb 1965	Park Arena, Yokohama, Japan	
10	Draw	5–3–2	Wasaburo Kokubo	PTS	4	26 Jan 1965	Riki Sports Palace, Tokyo, Japan	
9	Draw	5–3–1	Star Yasunaka	PTS	4	20 Dec 1964	Korakuen Gym, Tokyo, Japan	
8	Win	5–3	Junya Arata	PTS	4	25 Oct 1964	Korakuen Gym, Tokyo, Japan	
7	Win	4–3	Karyo Kobayashi	PTS	4	29 Jun 1964	Korakuen Gym, Tokyo, Japan	
6	Win	3–3	Junro Mori	PTS	4	5 May 1964	Riki Sports Palace, Tokyo, Japan	
5	Loss	2–3	Yoshihiro Kawakami	PTS	4	14 Apr 1964	Riki Sports Palace, Tokyo, Japan	
4	Win	2–2	Hideo Isono	PTS	4	16 Feb 1964	Park Arena, Yokohama, Japan	
3	Loss	1–2	Tetsuo Mori	PTS	4	30 Dec 1963	Korakuen Gym, Tokyo, Japan	
2	Loss	1–1	Tsuyoshi Suzuki	PTS	4	28 Nov 1963	Korakuen Gym, Tokyo, Japan	
1	Win	1–0	Kohachi Haga	PTS	4	1 Nov 1963	Park Arena, Yokohama, Japan	

== See also ==
- List of light-flyweight boxing champions
- List of Japanese boxing world champions
- Boxing in Japan

Achievements
Preceded by Chartchai Chionoi	WBA flyweight champion October 18, 1974 - April 1, 1975	Succeeded by Erbito Salavarria
