= Masao Ohba =

Japanese boxer

Personal information
- Nickname: The Eternal Champion
- Nationality: Japanese
- Born: Masao Ohba 大場政夫; October 21, 1949 Sumida, Tokyo, Japan
- Died: January 25, 1973 (aged 23) Tokyo, Japan
- Height: 5 ft 6.1 in (1.68 m)
- Weight: Flyweight

Boxing career
- Stance: Orthodox

Boxing record
- Total fights: 38
- Wins: 35
- Win by KO: 16
- Losses: 2
- Draws: 1

Masao Ohba (大場政夫, Ōba Masao; October 21, 1949 – January 25, 1973) was a Japanese professional boxer. He became the WBA flyweight World Champion on October 22, 1970, defeating the reigning champion Berkrerk Chartvanchai in Tokyo and retained the championship for an impressive 5 title straight defenses. He died in a car accident at 23, still holding his world title. He was trained by Isamu Kuwata.He is Soh Ohba's uncle. Soh's adoptive father is Masao's younger brother, Isaburo Ohba, who is 5 years younger than him. Since 1994, Isaburo has served as the chairman of the Japan Renewal Party Yokohama City Rental Supporting Members Liaison Committee, the assistant secretary general of the New Frontier Party (Japan)(NFP) Kanagawa Prefectural Union, and a temporary staff member of the NFP successor party.

== Childhood and early career ==
Ohba was born on October 21, 1949. Ohba's father was a factory worker and a compulsive gambler, causing him to know poverty from an early age. His father followed professional boxing as an avid fan which influenced Ohba's childhood aspirations and dreams. By the time Ohba was in elementary school, he dreamt of becoming a world champion, and bringing himself and his family out of poverty.

After completing middle school, he took a job in a candy shop to help support his family and trained as a boxer in the evening. He joined the Teiken Boxing Gym in 1965. Because Ohba weighed only about 105 pounds and barely stood five feet when he entered the gym, the trainers doubted that he would be successful as a professional boxer. He trained hard, putting on the seven pounds of muscle he needed to box within the flyweight range by the time he made his debut. He later had trouble making the strict flyweight limit later in his career, and at nearly five feet six inches was somewhat tall for a flyweight.

== Professional Boxing career ==
Ohba made his professional debut on November 7, 1966, at the age of 17 against Kazuyoshi Watanabe in Tokyo. Between November 1966 and August 1968, he won all but one of his first eighteen bouts, with one draw. He fought all of these matches in his hometown of Tokyo.

On December 14, 1969, he defeated Bernabe Villacampo in a non-title fight by way of a ten-round Unanimous Decision on points in Tokyo. Villicampo was Flyweight Champion at the time, making Oba's clear win an important victory, as well as an upset.

=== Taking the WBA World Flyweight Title ===
He got his first world title shot on October 22, 1970, at Nichidi Auditorium, Nihon University, in Tokyo, against Berkrerk Chartvanchai, who was the WBA World flyweight champion. He won by TKO in the 13th round before a crowd of 7000, becoming the eighth Japanese boxer to capture a world title. According to one source, the bout was postponed from its initial date when Chartvanchai took ill with a high fever. Chartvanchai was down three times before finally being called out for the full count. Enrique Jimenez refereed. Oba finished off Chartvanchai with a volley of punches to the head at 2:16 into the thirteenth round. Charvantchai had trouble making the weight limit, even after doing light exercise and taking a steam bath, which may have weakened him for the bout. Oba gained a considerable lead in points throughout the match. Chartvanchai was weakened both by a cut to his eye he received in the fourth round which gave him trouble and the efforts he took to make weight.

=== First four defenses of the WBA World Flyweight Title ===
On January 21, 1971, he defeated Swiss boxer Fritz Chervet in a non-title fight technical knockout at Korakuen Hall in Tokyo, Japan. The bout was ended after 1:31 into the eighth round.

Ohba made his first three WBA World Flyweight Championship defenses by 15-round decisions, and his 4th defense by 5th-round KO, all at Nihon University Stadium in Tokyo. He also fought four non-title matches in between his defenses, winning all of them as well. His first defense was against the great champion Betulio González on April 1, 1971, in Tokyo in a very significant fifteen round Unanimous Decision. González would hold the Venezuelan Flyweight Title, and at one time hold both the WBC and WBA World Flyweight Championships.

On August 19, 1971, he won a Unanimous Decision over Tony Moreno of San Antonio in a non-title ten round bout. The audience of 2000 were somewhat disappointed as Ohba was unable to score a knockdown against his opponent.

His second defense of the World Flyweight Title was also a fifteen-round Unanimous Decision on October 23, 1971, against Filipino boxer Fernando Cabanela. His third defense was against Japanese boxer Susumu Hanagata on March 4, 1972, in a fifteen-round mixed decision in Tokyo. Hanagata, an accomplished flyweight, would briefly take the WBA World Flyweight Title in October 1974.

His fourth WBA World Flyweight defense was against Orlando "Yango" Amores from Colón, Republic of Panamá, on June 20, 1972, in Tokyo. Ohba impressively won on a fifth-round knockout.

== Last fight, fifth defense of WBA World Flyweight Title ==
On January 2, 1973, Ohba faced the Thai veteran boxer, Chartchai Chionoi, for his fourth defense. Ohba was knocked down with a right hook in only forty seconds into the first round, and injured his right ankle while falling to the canvas. He managed to pick himself up, and his corner iced his ankle in between rounds, but Ohba limped as he exchanged punches with Chionoi.

Even with his injury, Ohba managed to overpower Chionoi in the middle rounds, often using rights to the head, and finally knocked down the challenger for the first time a 2:19 into the 12th round. Chionoi was knocked down two more times in the round, and having been knocked down three times, the bout was ruled an automatic knockout. Ohba marked a dramatic 12th-round KO win for his 5th WBA World Flyweight Title defense.

He remarked to an interviewer after the bout that "I did not expect the Thai to put up such a good fight, it was my hardest fight so far." He also noted "I did not expect the long hook that hit me first and made me groggy", and "I did not expect the second that dropped me on my pants."

== Premature death in car accident ==
On the morning of January 25, 1973, only three weeks after his last defense, Ohba died in a car accident. He was returning to the Teiken Gym where he both trained and lived. Ohba was driving his new 1973 ivory Chevrolet Corvette down an expressway in Tokyo, when he hit a heavy duty eleven ton parked truck on the shoulder of the opposite lane. His Corvette had jumped the road divider when he was unable to negotiate a turn and he was unable to regain control. He was driving around 60, in a 36-mile per hour zone and was an inexperienced driver, having only obtained his driver's license three months before the crash. He was only 23 years old, and still in possession of the WBA title. As a dutiful son, he had just bought his parents a new home. On February 5, 1973, a funeral service was held by the World Boxing Association at Korakuen Hall in Tokyo, where he had once boxed. A separate service had been held at his home in Kasuwbe, twenty miles north of Tokyo.

Ohba was dubbed "The Eternal Champion," because he was undefeated in world title bouts and died while still reigning champion. He had been planning on relinquishing his flyweight title to challenge for the bantamweight title before his death. His professional record was 35-2-1 (16KOs).

== Achievements and honors ==
Ohba was part of the 2015 class of the International Boxing Hall of Fame.

== Professional boxing record ==
38 fights	35 wins	2 losses
By knockout	16	0
By decision	19	2
Draws	1	

No.	Result	Record	Opponent	Type	Round, time	Date	Age	Location	Notes
38	Win	35–2–1	Chartchai Chionoi	KO	12 (15), 3:00	Jan 2, 1973	23 years, 73 days	Nihon University Auditorium, Japan	Retained WBA flyweight title
37	Win	34–2–1	Natalio Jimenez	KO	5 (12)	Sep 26, 1972	22 years, 341 days	Korakuen Hall, Japan	
36	Win	33–2–1	Orlando Amores	KO	5 (15), 2:00	Jun 20, 1972	22 years, 243 days	Nihon University Auditorium, Japan	Retained WBA flyweight title
35	Win	32–2–1	Susumu Hanagata	MD	15	Mar 4, 1972	22 years, 135 days	Nihon University Auditorium, Japan	Retained WBA flyweight title
34	Win	31–2–1	Fernando Cabanela	UD	15	Oct 23, 1971	22 years, 2 days	Nihon University Auditorium, Japan	Retained WBA flyweight title
33	Win	30–2–1	Tony Moreno	UD	10	Aug 19, 1971	21 years, 302 days	Korakuen Hall, Japan	
32	Win	29–2–1	Rocky Garcia	TKO	9 (10), 0:59	Jun 18, 1971	21 years, 240 days	Convention Center Arena, San Antonio, Texas, US	
31	Win	28–2–1	Betulio González	UD	15	Apr 1, 1971	21 years, 162 days	Nihon University Auditorium, Japan	Retained WBA flyweight title
30	Win	27–2–1	Fritz Chervet	TKO	8 (10), 1:31	Jan 21, 1971	21 years, 92 days	Korakuen Hall, Japan	
29	Win	26–2–1	Berkrerk Chartvanchai	KO	13 (15), 2:16	Oct 22, 1970	21 years, 1 day	Nihon University Auditorium, Japan	Won WBA flyweight title
28	Win	25–2–1	Baby Corona	KO	8 (10)	Jun 21, 1970	20 years, 243 days	Korakuen Hall, Japan	
27	Win	24–2–1	Rudy Billones	UD	10	Mar 1, 1970	20 years, 131 days	Japan	
26	Win	23–2–1	Bernabe Villacampo	UD	10	Dec 14, 1969	20 years, 54 days	Korakuen Hall, Japan	
25	Win	22–2–1	Takeshi Nakamura	UD	10	Aug 18, 1969	19 years, 301 days	Japan	
24	Win	21–2–1	Sakdinoi ETO	PTS	10	Jun 23, 1969	19 years, 245 days	Japan	
23	Win	20–2–1	Yoshiaki Matsumoto	UD	10	May 5, 1969	19 years, 196 days	Japan	
22	Win	19–2–1	Speedy Hayase	PTS	10	Mar 3, 1969	19 years, 133 days	Japan	
21	Win	18–2–1	Shuta Yoshino	PTS	10	Dec 23, 1968	19 years, 63 days	Sendai, Japan	
20	Win	17–2–1	Yuzo Narumi	PTS	10	Oct 28, 1968	19 years, 7 days	Japan	
19	Loss	16–2–1	Susumu Hanagata	UD	10	Sep 2, 1968	18 years, 317 days	Korakuen Hall, Japan	
18	Win	16–1–1	Shoji Wada	PTS	8	Aug 5, 1968	18 years, 289 days	Japan	
17	Win	15–1–1	Shoichi Fujimaki	KO	3 (10)	Jun 17, 1968	18 years, 240 days	Japan	
16	Win	14–1–1	Takeo Tamaya	TKO	4 (6)	May 13, 1968	18 years, 205 days	Japan	
15	Win	13–1–1	Shoji Wada	PTS	6	Mar 11, 1968	18 years, 142 days	Japan	
14	Win	12–1–1	Samurai Hagiri	PTS	6	Jan 8, 1968	18 years, 79 days	Korakuen Hall, Japan	
13	Win	11–1–1	Shunichi Minagawa	PTS	4	Dec 14, 1967	18 years, 54 days	Kokugikan, Japan	
12	Win	10–1–1	Toshimi Yasuda	KO	4 (4)	Nov 13, 1967	18 years, 23 days	Japan	
11	Draw	9–1–1	Snappy Asano	PTS	4	Oct 13, 1967	17 years, 357 days	Japan	
10	Win	9–1	Masao Ohara	RTD	2 (4)	Sep 22, 1967	17 years, 336 days	Japan	
9	Win	8–1	Yasuo Jo	PTS	4	Sep 3, 1967	17 years, 317 days	Japan	
8	Win	7–1	Tadashi Nishikawa	KO	1 (4)	Jul 31, 1967	17 years, 283 days	Japan	
7	Loss	6–1	Masakazu Tani	UD	4	Jun 16, 1967	17 years, 238 days	Osaka, Japan	
6	Win	6–0	Kunio Shimada	PTS	4	Apr 30, 1967	17 years, 191 days	Kokugikan, Japan	
5	Win	5–0	Kenji Otsuka	PTS	4	Mar 27, 1967	17 years, 157 days	Japan	
4	Win	4–0	Sumio Arai	RTD	3 (4)	Feb 20, 1967	17 years, 122 days	Korakuen Hall, Japan	
3	Win	3–0	Ryoichi Takahashi	KO	2 (4)	Jan 2, 1967	17 years, 73 days	Japan	
2	Win	2–0	Joji Kuroki	KO	3 (4)	Dec 12, 1966	17 years, 52 days	Japan	
1	Win	1–0	Kazuyoshi Watanabe	KO	1 (4)	Nov 7, 1966	17 years, 17 days	Japan	

== See also ==
- Toshiro Mayuzumi - Composed the entrance theme sports march and fantased.
- Shintaro Ishihara -Guest appearance on the live broadcast of the world title match.
- List of WBA world champions
- List of Japanese boxing world champions
- Boxing in Japan

Sporting positions
World boxing titles
Preceded by Berkrerk Chartvanchai	WBA flyweight champion October 22, 1970 – January 25, 1973; Died	Vacant Title next held by Chartchai Chionoi
Records
Preceded by Carlos Cruz	Latest born world champion to die January 25, 1973 – August 12, 1982	Succeeded by Salvador Sánchez
Preceded by Francisco Guilledo	Shortest living world champion January 25, 1973 – present	Incumbent
