= Flyweight =

Weight class in combat sports

Flyweight is a weight class in combat sports.

== Boxing ==
Flyweight is a class in boxing which includes fighters weighing up to and including 51 kg (112 lb) for a title fight.

=== Professional boxing ===
The flyweight division was the last of boxing's eight traditional weight classes to be established. Before 1909, anyone below featherweight was considered a bantamweight, regardless of how small the boxer. In 1911, the organization that eventually became the British Boxing Board of Control held a match that crowned Sid Smith as the first flyweight champion of the world. Jimmy Wilde, who reigned from 1916 to 1923, was the first fighter recognized both in Britain and the United States as a flyweight champion.

Other notable flyweights include Victor Perez, Pancho Villa, Walter McGowan, Pascual Pérez, Pone Kingpetch, Salvatore Burruni, Fighting Harada, Masao Ohba, Chartchai Chionoi, Efren Torres, Erbito Salavarria, Miguel Canto, Dave McAuley, Charlie Magri, Gabriel Bernal, Santos Laciar, Sot Chitalada, Yong-Kang Kim, Yuri Arbachakov, Danny Romero, Mark "Too Sharp" Johnson, Manny Pacquiao, Jorge Arce, Vic Darchinyan, Nonito Donaire, Omar Andrés Narváez, Pongsaklek Wonjongkam, Amnat Ruenroeng, Román González, Donnie Nietes, Nicola Adams.

==== World champions ====
| Sanctioning Body | Reign Began | Champion | Record | Defenses |
|---|---|---|---|---|
| WBA | October 10, 2026 | Sergio Mendoza | 29–1 (24 KO) | 0 |
| WBC | October 10, 2026 | Sergio Mendoza | 29–1 (24 KO) | 0 |
| IBF | March 29, 2025 | Masamichi Yabuki | 20–4 (18 KO) | 2 |
| WBO | July 20, 2024 | Anthony Olascuaga | 12–1 (9 KO) | 5 |

==== The Ring world rankings ====
As of August 8, 2025

Keys:

C The Ring world champion

| Rank | Name | Record | Title(s) |
|---|---|---|---|
| C | vacant | | |
| 1 | Ricardo Sandoval | 27–2 (18 KO) | WBC, WBA |
| 2 | Kenshiro Teraji | 25–2 (16 KO) | |
| 3 | Seigo Yuri Akui | 21–3–1 (11 KO) | |
| 4 | Masamichi Yabuki | 18–4 (17 KO) | IBF |
| 5 | Galal Yafai | 9–0–0–1 (7 KO) | |
| 6 | Ángel Ayala | 18–1 (8 KO) | |
| 7 | Felix Alvarado | 42–4 (35 KO) | |
| 8 | Anthony Olascuaga | 9–1 (6 KO) | WBO |
| 9 | Tobias Reyes | 17–1–1 (16 KO) | |
| 10 | Jukiya Iimura | 9–1 (2 KO) | |

==== Longest reigning world flyweight champions ====
Below is a list of longest reigning flyweight champions in boxing measured by the individual's longest reign. Career total time as champion (for multiple time champions) does not apply.

| | Name | Title reign | Title recognition | Successful defenses | Beaten opponents | Fights |
|---|---|---|---|---|---|---|
| 1. | Omar Andres Narvaez | 7 years, 10 months | WBO | 16 | 15 | |
| 2. | Jimmy Wilde | 7 years, 4 months, 4 days | World | 3 | 3 | |
| 3. | Pongsaklek Wonjongkam | 6 years, 4 months, 16 days | WBC | 17 | 16 | |
| 4. | Artem Dalakian | 5 years, 10 months, 27 days | WBA | 5 | 5 | |
| 3. | Irene Pacheco | 5 years, 8 months, 6 days | IBF | 6 | 6 | |
| 6. | Pascual Perez | 5 years, 4 months, 20 days | World | 9 | 9 | |
| 7. | Yuri Arbachakov | 5 years, 4 months, 19 days | WBC | 9 | 9 | |
| 8. | Jackie Paterson | 4 years, 9 months, 4 days | NBA | 1 | 1 | |
| 9. | Miguel Canto | 4 years, 2 months, 10 days | WBC | 14 | 11 | |
| 10. | Moruti Mthalane | 4 years, 1 month, 23 days | IBF | 4 | 4 | |
| 11. | Sot Chitalada | 3 years, 9 months, 16 days | WBC | 6 | 5 | |

=== Amateur boxing ===
==== Olympic Champions ====
===== Men's =====
- 1904: George Finnegan (USA)
- 1920: Frankie Genaro (USA)
- 1924: Fidel La Barba (USA)
- 1928: Antal Kocsis (HUN)
- 1932: István Énekes (HUN)
- 1936: Willi Kaiser (GER)
- 1948: Pascual Pérez (ARG)
- 1952: Nathan Brooks (USA)
- 1956: Terry Spinks (GBR)
- 1960: Gyula Török (HUN)
- 1964: Fernando Atzori (ITA)
- 1968: Ricardo Delgado (MEX)
- 1972: Georgi Kostadinov (BUL)
- 1976: Leo Randolph (USA)
- 1980: Petar Lessov (BUL)
- 1984: Steve McCrory (USA)
- 1988: Kim Kwang-Sun (KOR)
- 1992: Choi Chol-Su (PRK)
- 1996: Maikro Romero (CUB)
- 2000: Wijan Ponlid (THA)
- 2004: Yuriorkis Gamboa (CUB)
- 2008: Somjit Jongjohor (THA)
- 2012: Robeisy Ramirez (CUB)
- 2016: Shakhobidin Zoirov (UZB)
- 2020: Galal Yafai (GBR)
- 2024: Hasanboy Dusmatov (UZB)

===== Women's =====
- 2012: Nicola Adams (GBR)
- 2016: Nicola Adams (GBR)
- 2020: Stoyka Krasteva (BUL)

==== Pan American Champions ====
===== Men's =====
- 1951: (Argentina) Alberto Barenghi (ARG)
- 1955: (Mexico) Hilario Correa (MEX)
- 1959: (Argentina) Miguel Angel Botta (ARG)
- 1963: (Uruguay) Floreal García (URU)
- 1967: (Venezuela) Francisco Rodríguez (VEN)
- 1971: (Venezuela) Francisco Rodríguez (VEN)
- 1975: (Cuba) Ramón Duvalón (CUB)
- 1979: (Puerto Rico) Alberto Mercado (PUR)
- 1983: (Cuba) Pedro Orlando Reyes (CUB)
- 1987: (Cuba) Adalberto Regalado (CUB)
- 1991: (Cuba) José Ramos (CUB)
- 1995: (Dominican Republic) Joan Guzmán (DOM)
- 1999: (Argentina) Omar Andrés Narváez (ARG)
- 2003: (Cuba) Yuriorkis Gamboa (CUB)
- 2007: (Puerto Rico) McWilliams Arroyo (PUR)
- 2011: (Cuba) Robeisy Ramírez (CUB)
- 2015: (United States) Antonio Vargas (USA)
- 2019: (Dominican Republic) Rodrigo Marte (DOM)

== Kickboxing ==
In kickboxing, a flyweight fighter generally weighs 53 kg (116 lb) or under. The International Kickboxing Federation (IKF) Flyweight division (professional and amateur) is 112.1 lb. – 117 lb. or 50.95 kg – 53.18 kg.

In ONE Championship, the flyweight division is up to 61.2 kg (135 lb).

== Bare-knuckle boxing ==
The limit for flyweight generally differs among promotions in bare knuckle boxing:

- In Bare Knuckle Fighting Championship, the flyweight division has an upper limit of 125 lb (57 kg).
- In BKB™, the flyweight division has an upper limit of 70 kg (154 lb).

== Mixed martial arts ==
The flyweight division in mixed martial arts – as defined by the Nevada State Athletic Commission combat sports doctrine and by the Association of Boxing Commissions – groups together all competitors 125 lb (57 kg) and below. It sits between Strawweight (106 lb-115 lb) and Bantamweight (126 lb-135lb). The weight limit for Women's MMA is also 125 lb (56.7 kg).

The flyweight division in mixed martial arts refers to a number of different weight classes:

- The UFC's flyweight division, which groups competitors within 116 to 125 lb (53 to 57 kg)
- The Pancrase light flyweight division with an upper limit of 54 kg (119 lb)
- The Shooto flyweight division with an upper limit of 114.6 lb (52 kg)
- The ONE Championship's flyweight division, with upper limit at 61.2 kg (134.9 lb)
- The Road FC's flyweight division, with upper limit at 125 lb (57 kg)

=== Professional champions ===
These tables were last updated in October of 2026.

Active title reign
Active title reign (interim)

Men:

| Organization | Reign Began | Champion | Record | Defenses |
|---|---|---|---|---|
| UFC | December 6, 2025 | (Myanmar) Joshua Van | 18-2-0 (9KO 2SUB) | 2 |
| ONE Championship | April 29, 2026 | (Uzbekistan) Avazbek Kholmirzaev | 18-2-0 (9KO 6SUB) | 0 |
| Rizin FF | November 8, 2026 | (Canada) Tony Laramie | 14-3-0 (7KO 0SUB) | 0 |
| ACA | June 28, 2025 | (Russia) Azamat Pshukov | 14-3-0 (8KO 3SUB) | 0 |
| Brave CF | November 7, 2025 | (United Kingdom) Muhammad Mokaev | 16-0-0 (3KO 7SUB) | 0 |
| CFFC | September 27, 2024 | (Indonesia) Bilal Hasan | 7-0-0 (5KO 1SUB) | 2 |
| Cage Warriors | December 6, 2025 | (France) Nicolas Leblond | 13-4-0 (3KO 6SUB) | 0 |
| Pancrase | April 3, 2024 | (Japan) Seiichiro Ito | 18-4-0 (3KO 12SUB) | 0 |
| Jungle Fight | March 22, 2023 | (Brazil) Wagner Reis | 9-4-0 (7KO 1SUB) | 0 |
| LFA | March 22, 2025 | (Brazil) Eduardo Henrique | 15-2-0 (7KO 4SUB) | 2 |
| LFA | February 7, 2025 | (Brazil) Marcos Degli | 13-3-0 (8KO 4SUB) | 1 |
| LUX Fight League | February 13, 2026 | (Mexico) Paulino Siller | 17-3-0 (2KO 7SUB) | 0 |
| Oktagon MMA | June 28, 2025 | (Kazakhstan) Zhalgas Zhumagulov | 18-9-0 (8KO 1SUB) | 0 |
| DEEP | August 17, 2025 | (Japan) Yutaro Muramoto | 14-9-2 (5KO 2SUB) | 0 |

Women:

| Organization | Reign Began | Champion | Record | Defenses |
|---|---|---|---|---|
| UFC | October 3, 2026 | (Brazil) Natália Silva | 21–5–1 (5KO 7SUB) | 0 |
| PFL | October 16, 2026 | (United States) Jena Bishop | 12–3 (0KO 7SUB) | 0 |
| Invicta FC | N/A | Vacant | N/A | N/A |
| Deep Jewels | May 8, 2022 | (Japan) Rin Nakai | 28-2 (10KO 12SUB) | 0 |
| Pancrase | March 9, 2025 | (Japan) Fumika Watanabe | 3-1 (1KO 0SUB) | 0 |
| Jungle Fight | March 26, 2023 | (Brazil) Elora Dana | 8-1 (1KO 5SUB) | 2 |
| LFA | February 23, 2024 | (Canada) Shannon Clark | 7-1 (3KO 1SUB) | 2 |

== See also ==
- List of current MMA Flyweight Champions
- List of Road FC Flyweight Champions
- List of current MMA Women's Flyweight Champions
