= Joey Olivo =

American boxer and boxing trainer (born 1958)

Personal information
- Born: January 25, 1958 (age 68) San Fernando, California, U.S.
- Height: 5 ft 9 in (175 cm)
- Weight: Light flyweight; Flyweight; Super flyweight; Bantamweight

Boxing career
- Stance: Orthodox

Boxing record
- Total fights: 47
- Wins: 39
- Win by KO: 11
- Losses: 8

Joey Olivo (born January 25, 1958) is an American former professional boxer of Mexican descent who competed from 1976 to 1989. He held the WBA world light flyweight title in 1985 and challenged for the WBC world light flyweight title in 1981. At regional level he held the WBC-NABF light flyweight title in 1983; the IBF-USBA flyweight title in 1984; and the WBC-NABF flyweight title in 1988.

Olivo is the first American to hold a version of the world Junior Flyweight title.

== Biography ==
Olivo who is of Mexican descent, was a gang member in East L.A. before he started boxing as an amateur. He once worked part time as an assistant at a dental laboratory, while still fighting as a professional boxer.

== Professional boxing career ==
Olivo began boxing as a professional on June 19, 1976, when he was eighteen years and five months of age. That night, he beat Paz Mena by four-round points decision at the Inglewood Forum in Inglewood, California as part of the undercard headlined by a WBA featherweight title bout between Alexis Arguello and Sal Torres.

Olivo built a record of 15–0 (3 KOs), fighting in places like the Forum, the Silver Slipper in Las Vegas, Nevada, and the Los Angeles Sports Arena when he met the 2–0 coming in, future WBC flyweight champion Eleoncio Mercedes of the Dominican Republic at the Olympic Auditorium in Los Angeles as the headliner fight of a show promoted by Aileen Eaton. He outpointed Mercedes over ten rounds, winning by unanimous decision on August 10, 1978. Three wins later, Olivo faced the fellow future WBA light flyweight champion, Mexico's Lupe Madera, 21–8 coming into their fight, on March 5, 1979 for Madera's WBC-NABF light flyweight title in Houston, Texas. Olivo won the regional title by defeating Madera via unanimous decision over twelve rounds.

Having reached a record of 22–0 (6 KOs), Olivo had his first professional fight to be held abroad when he went to Santiago, Chile, to face Chilean Martin Vargas, 55–5–3, at the Estadio Chile on November 16, 1979. According to Olivo himself in an interview with Richard Hoffer of the Los Angeles Times in 1986, he dropped Vargas in round nine and had photographers asking him to look their way as they thought Olivo was going to win the bout. Olivo, nevertheless, lost the fight and his undefeated record by points decision over ten rounds.

His next bout was a defense of his WBC-NABF light flyweight title against future WBC flyweight champion Amado Ursua of Mexico. Ursua had 21 wins and 4 losses when the two fought on February 9, 1980 at the Olympic Auditorium on the undercard of an event headlined by Lupe Pintor's WBC bantamweight title defense against Alberto Sandoval in another show promoted by Aileen Eaton. Olivo retained the regional title with a twelve-round unanimous decision victory.

Olivo ran his record to 26–1 (7 KOs) by scoring three more victories before receiving his first world title fight. His bout with Panama's Hilario Zapata was for the WBC light flyweight title. Olivo lost by a thirteenth-round knockout to the future member of the International Boxing Hall of Fame, on February 8, 1981 at the Gimnasio Nuevo Panama (now Roberto Durán Arena) in Panama City, Panama. Olivo then lost to local prospect Reynaldo Jose Becerra by unanimous decision over ten rounds on June 15, at Caracas, Venezuela, before visiting Mexico, where he split his next two bouts beating 28–4 Candido Tellez on October 23 but then losing to future world champion German Torres, 33–5–1, via ten-round points decision on January 23, 1982, at the Arena Coliseo in Mexico City.

Back in the US, Olivo won five fights in a row, including a successful defense of his WBC-NABF light flyweight title against 6–6 trialhorse Luis Fernando Hernandez by twelve-round unanimous decision on Sunday, October 9, 1983 in Ventura, California, before facing future world title challenger Henry Brent, 8–3 coming in, in another WBC-NABF title defense for Olivo. He won this fight by twelve-round unanimous decision, losing only one round combined in all three judges' scorecards, on March 21, 1984 at the Showboat Hotel and Casino in Las Vegas, as the headlining bout of a show offered by promoter Don King's company, Don King Productions.

=== World champion ===
Olivo won one more fight and then, with a record of 34–4 (9 KOs), he once again attempted to become a light flyweight world champion when he faced the WBA champion, the Dominican Republic's Francisco Quiroz, who had a record of 11–10–1 with one no contest, when challenged by Olivo on March 29, 1985 at the Convention Center in Miami Beach, Florida. Olivo became the WBA light flyweight champion when he beat Quiroz by a close but unanimous fifteen-round decision with scores of 145–143, 144–143 and 143–142, all in favor of the Californian. With the win, Olivo became the first American world junior flyweight boxing champion in history.

Olivo's first title defense took him to South Korea, where the champion duly met challenger and South Korean national light flyweight champion Moon Jin Choi, 8–2–2 coming in, on July 28 at the Munhwa Gymnasium in Seoul. Olivo retained the title by a close but unanimous fifteen-round decision.

A return trip to South Korea meant losing his world title for Olivo, as he went back to the Asian country late in 1985 to defend the title against future International Boxing Hall of Fame member Myung Woo Yuh, who was 18–0 (4 KOs) coming into their December 8 meeting at the Municipal Stadium in Daegu. Olivo lost the bout via fifteen-round split decision with scores of 148–142 and 146–141 against him and 145–143 in his favor.

Now near the end of his professional boxing career, Olivo pulled victories over Eyüp Can and future WBO super flyweight champion Jose Quirino before winning the vacant WBC-NABF flyweight title against 10–3–1 Fernando Varguez by twelve-round unanimous decision on June 16, 1988 at the Great Western Forum in Los Angeles.

The win against Varguez was the last career win for Olivo, who next lost the WBC-NABF flyweight title in his first defense, to Mexico's former world title challenger Javier Lucas by a first-round knockout on October 3 in Tijuana and then lost one more fight before facing future IBF super flyweight champion Robert Quiroga, losing that fight, which was for the vacant WBC Continental Americas super flyweight title, by twelve-round unanimous decision on July 7, 1989 at the Sunken Gardens in San Antonio, Texas.

== Professional boxing record ==
Olivo retired with a professional boxing record of 39 wins and 8 losses in 47 bouts, with 11 wins and 2 losses by knockout.

== After boxing ==
Olivo began working as a boxing trainer at Norwalk during 1992 and has worked at the Norwalk Arts and Sports Complex since, training boxers such as world champion Abner Mares.

Sporting positions
Regional boxing titles
Preceded by Lupe Madera	WBC-NABF light flyweight champion March 5, 1979 – 1984	Vacant Title next held by Willy Salazar
Preceded by Henry Brent	IBF-USBA flyweight champion March 21, 1984 – June 1984	Vacant Title next held by Henry Brent
Vacant Title last held by Orlando Canizales	WBC-NABF flyweight champion June 16, 1988 – October 3, 1988	Succeeded by Javier Lucas
World boxing titles
Preceded by Francisco Quiroz	WBA light flyweight champion March 29, 1985 – December 8, 1985	Succeeded by Yuh Myung-woo
