= Juan Herrera (boxer) =

Mexican boxer (born 1958)

Personal information
- Nickname: Juanito
- Born: 12 January 1958 (age 68) Mérida, Yucatán, Mexico
- Weight: Flyweight

Boxing career
- Stance: Orthodox

Boxing record
- Total fights: 52
- Wins: 40
- Win by KO: 26
- Losses: 11
- Draws: 1

Juan Herrera (born 12 January 1958) is a Mexican former professional boxer who competed from 1976 to 1988. He held the WBA flyweight title from 1981 to 1982.

== Professional career ==
In September 1979, Herrera won the Yucatán State flyweight title by stopping veteran Marco Antonio Benitez in the tenth round.

=== WBA flyweight title ===
On September 26, 1981, Herrera won the WBA flyweight title by upsetting Panamanian Luis Ibarra via an eleventh round T.K.O. in Mérida, Yucatán, Mexico. He defended the title once against Venezuelan Betulio Gonzalez, before losing it to Santos Laciar, who beat him twice. The first time by thirteenth round knockout in Merida and the second time by fifteen round decision at Italy.

== Professional boxing record ==
52 fights	40 wins	11 losses
By knockout	26	4
By decision	14	7
Draws	1	

No.	Result	Record	Opponent	Type	Round, time	Date	Location	Notes
52	Loss	40–11–1	Javier Lucas	TKO	3 (10)	1988-07-23	Tijuana, Mexico	
51	Loss	40–10–1	Duke McKenzie	PTS	10 (10)	1987-12-02	Grand Hall, Wembley, England, U.K.	
50	Loss	40–9–1	Rafael Alonso	PTS	10 (10)	1987-10-17	Mérida, Mexico	
49	Win	40–8–1	Lincoln Salcedo	KO	1 (?)	1987-02-19	Guayaquil, Ecuador	
48	Loss	39–8–1	Richard Clarke	PTS	12 (12)	1986-12-05	Oceana Hotel, Kingston, Jamaica	For vacant WBC Continental Americas flyweight title
47	Loss	39–7–1	Alberto Castro	TKO	6 (10)	1986-06-28	Arena Panama Al Brown, Colón, Panama	
46	Win	39–6–1	Jorge Manuel Vera	KO	5 (?)	1986-03-15	Mérida, Mexico	
45	Win	38–6–1	Mercedes Valenzuela	TKO	6 (?)	1985-09-28	Mérida, Mexico	
44	Loss	37–6–1	Javier Lucas	RTD	9 (10)	1985-06-22	Poliforum Zamna, Mérida, Mexico	
43	Win	37–5–1	Arturo Sarmiento	KO	3 (?)	1985-05-18	Cancún, Mexico	
42	Win	36–5–1	Amado Ursua	PTS	10 (10)	1985-03-02	Mérida, Mexico	
41	Win	35–5–1	Efren Pinto	TKO	8 (?)	1984-12-08	Mérida, Mexico	
40	Loss	34–5–1	Jorge Cano	PTS	10 (10)	1984-08-11	Mexico City, Mexico	
39	Win	34–4–1	Rafael Alonso	TKO	2 (?)	1984-07-14	Mexico City, Mexico	
38	Loss	33–4–1	Santos Laciar	SD	15 (15)	1984-01-28	Palazzo Dello Sport, Marsala, Italy	For WBA flyweight title
37	Win	33–3–1	Mario González	PTS	10 (10)	1983-05-14	Mérida, Mexico	
36	Win	32–3–1	Aaron Garcia	PTS	10 (10)	1983-02-05	Mérida, Mexico	
35	Win	31–3–1	Santiago Perez	KO	5 (?)	1982-12-16	Chetumal, Mexico	
34	Win	30–3–1	Rafael Guerra	KO	3 (?)	1982-11-13	Mérida, Mexico	
33	Loss	29–3–1	Santos Laciar	TKO	13 (15)	1982-05-01	Carte Clara Baseball Park, Mérida, Mexico	Lost WBA flyweight title
32	Win	29–2–1	Betulio González	TKO	7 (15)	1981-12-19	Carte Clara Baseball Park, Mérida, Mexico	Retained WBA flyweight title
31	Win	28–2–1	Luis Ibarra	TKO	11 (15)	1981-09-26	Carte Clara Baseball Park, Mérida, Mexico	Won WBA flyweight title
30	Win	27–2–1	Elfego Lopez	TKO	7 (10)	1981-08-22	Villahermosa, Mexico	
29	Win	26–2–1	Amado Ursua	TKO	8 (10)	1981-04-26	Tuxtla Gutiérrez, Mexico	
28	Win	25–2–1	Rodolfo Martínez	UD	10 (10)	1981-02-22	Mérida, Mexico	
27	Loss	24–2–1	Jose Herrera	PTS	10 (10)	1980-11-29	Mexico City, Mexico	
26	Win	24–1–1	Jose Luis Cetina	KO	6 (?)	1980-09-20	Cozumel, Mexico	
25	Win	23–1–1	Ubaldo Gonzalez	TKO	8 (?)	1980-08-30	Mérida, Mexico	
24	Win	22–1–1	Elid Fernandez	TKO	3 (?)	1980-06-14	Mérida, Mexico	
23	Win	21–1–1	Antonio Escobar	PTS	10 (10)	1980-04-26	Mérida, Mexico	
22	Win	20–1–1	Roberto Ruiz	PTS	10 (10)	1980-02-27	Mérida, Mexico	
21	Win	19–1–1	Fidel Martinez	KO	4 (?)	1980-01-23	Mérida, Mexico	
20	Win	18–1–1	Hak Young Kim	TKO	5 (?)	1979-12-16	Gudeok Gymnasium, Busan, South Korea	
19	Win	17–1–1	Marco Antonio Benitez	PTS	12 (12)	1979-09-05	Mérida, Mexico	
18	Win	16–1–1	Miguel Gonzalez	PTS	10 (10)	1979-04-25	Mérida, Mexico	
17	Win	15–1–1	Baltazar Espana	TKO	4 (?)	1979-03-28	Mérida, Mexico	
16	Win	14–1–1	Victor Diaz	KO	8 (?)	1979-01-29	Tuxtla Gutiérrez, Mexico	
15	Win	13–1–1	Victor Diaz	TKO	5 (?)	1978-06-15	Mérida, Mexico	
14	Win	12–1–1	Juan Cardona	KO	6 (?)	1978-05-03	Mérida, Mexico	
13	Win	11–1–1	Gregorio Tiaguayuchi	KO	2 (?)	1978-04-12	Mérida, Mexico	
12	Win	10–1–1	Martin Ordonez	KO	5 (?)	1978-03-01	Mérida, Mexico	
11	Win	9–1–1	Javier Garcia	TKO	5 (?)	1978-01-21	Candelaria, Mexico	
10	Loss	8–1–1	Mario Chavez	PTS	6 (6)	1977-09-01	Olympic Auditorium, Los Angeles, California, U.S.	
9	Win	8–0–1	Guillermo Mis	PTS	8 (8)	1977-03-22	Mérida, Mexico	
8	Win	7–0–1	Eleazar Hong	PTS	6 (6)	1976-08-27	Halachó, Mexico	
7	Win	6–0–1	Alex Parra	KO	4 (?)	1976-08-04	Mérida, Mexico	
6	Win	5–0–1	Andres Cetina	PTS	6 (6)	1976-07-23	Halachó, Mexico	
5	Win	4–0–1	Ernesto Gonzalez	PTS	4 (4)	1976-05-21	Halachó, Mexico	
4	Draw	3–0–1	German Vasquez	PTS	? (4)	1976-04-12	Dzidzantún, Mexico	
3	Win	3–0	Raymundo Valdez	PTS	6 (6)	1976-03-26	Mérida, Mexico	
2	Win	2–0	German Vasquez	TKO	2 (?)	1976-03-15	Mérida, Mexico	
1	Win	1–0	Pepe Jimenez	PTS	4 (4)	1976-03-08	Mérida, Mexico	

== See also ==
- List of Mexican boxing world champions
- List of world flyweight boxing champions

Sporting positions
World boxing titles
Preceded by Luis Ibarra	WBA flyweight champion September 26, 1981 – May 1, 1982	Succeeded by Santos Laciar
