= Luis Ibarra (boxer) =

Panamanian boxer (born 1953)

Personal information
- Nickname: El Naja
- Born: Luis Ibarra Castillo; February 23, 1953 (age 73) Colón, Panama
- Weight: Flyweight

Boxing career
- Stance: Southpaw

Boxing record
- Total fights: 31
- Wins: 26
- Win by KO: 9
- Losses: 5

Luis Ibarra Castillo (born February 23, 1953) is a former Panamanian boxer who won the World Boxing Association flyweight championship. He was born in Colón, Panama.

== Pro career ==
Nicknamed "El Naja", Ibarra turned professional in 1975 and won the WBA flyweight title in 1979 when he won a decision over Betulio González. He lost the belt in his first defense when he was knocked out by Tae-Shik Kim in the 2nd round in 1980. He recaptured the WBA flyweight title with a decision win over Santos Laciar in 1981. He again lost the belt in his first defense to Juan Herrera by TKO. He retired the following year, and had a brief and unsuccessful comeback in 1989.

== Professional boxing record ==
31 fights	26 wins	5 losses
By knockout	9	3
By decision	16	2
By disqualification	1	0

No.	Result	Record	Opponent	Type	Round, time	Date	Location	Notes
31	Loss	26–5	Benedicto Murillo	TKO	6 (10)	1990-03-10	Gimnasio Yuyin Luzcando, Betania, Panama	
30	Win	26–4	Roy Thompson	UD	10 (10)	1989-11-11	Arena Panama Al Brown, Colón, Panama	
29	Loss	25–4	Pedro Romero	UD	10 (10)	1989-08-05	Arena Panama Al Brown, Colón, Panama	
28	Win	25–3	Ernesto Sanchez	MD	10 (10)	1982-03-20	Arena Panama Al Brown, Colón, Panama	
27	Loss	24–3	Juan Herrera	TKO	11 (15)	1981-09-26	Carte Clara Baseball Park, Merida, Mexico	Lost WBA flyweight title
26	Win	24–2	Santos Laciar	UD	15 (15)	1981-06-06	Estadio Luna Park, Buenos Aires, Argentina	Won WBA flyweight title
25	Win	23–2	Andrés González	KO	1 (10)	1981-04-04	Arena Panama Al Brown, Colón, Panama	
24	Win	22–2	Donald Laguna	KO	6 (10)	1981-01-17	Gimnasio Nuevo Panama, Panama City, Panama	
23	Win	21–2	Modesto Gaytan	TKO	1 (10)	1980-11-01	Arena Panama Al Brown, Colón, Panama	
22	Win	20–2	Amado Ursua	UD	10 (10)	1980-05-31	Arena Panama Al Brown, Colón, Panama	
21	Loss	19–2	Kim Tae-shik	KO	2 (15)	1980-02-17	Jangchung Gymnasium, Seoul, South Korea	Lost WBA flyweight title
20	Win	19–1	Betulio González	UD	15 (15)	1979-11-17	Maestranza Cesar Giron, Maracay, Venezuela	Won WBA flyweight title
19	Win	18–1	Maximo Rodriguez	DQ	6 (10)	1979-08-04	Arena Panama Al Brown, Colón, Panama	
18	Win	17–1	Tomas Maza	TKO	2 (10)	1979-05-05	Arena de Colon, Colón, Panama	
17	Win	16–1	Prudencio Cardona	UD	10 (10)	1979-02-17	Arena de Colon, Colón, Panama	
16	Loss	15–1	Prudencio Cardona	PTS	10 (10)	1978-06-30	Barranquilla, Colombia	
15	Win	15–0	Felix Madrigal	PTS	10 (10)	1978-01-26	Gimnasio Nacional, San Jose, Costa Rica	
14	Win	14–0	Henry Diaz	UD	10 (10)	1977-12-17	Arena de Colon, Colón, Panama	
13	Win	13–0	Rafael Pedroza	UD	10 (10)	1977-10-01	Arena de Colon, Colón, Panama	
12	Win	12–0	Felix Madrigal	TKO	6 (10)	1977-07-16	Arena de Colon, Colón, Panama	
11	Win	11–0	Mauricio Buitrago	SD	10 (10)	1977-04-01	Arena de Colon, Colón, Panama	
10	Win	10–0	Jaime Ricardo	UD	10 (10)	1977-01-28	Arena de Colon, Colón, Panama	
9	Win	9–0	Enrique Torres	UD	12 (12)	1976-10-30	Arena de Colon, Colón, Panama	Won Panamanian flyweight title
8	Win	8–0	Carlos Rios	TKO	3 (10)	1976-09-18	Gimnasio del Artes y Oficios, Panama City, Panama	
7	Win	7–0	Juan Pimentel	TKO	2 (10)	1976-09-04	Arena de Colon, Colón, Panama	
6	Win	6–0	Arnulfo Ayala	TKO	2 (6)	1976-08-07	Arena de Colon, Colón, Panama	
5	Win	5–0	Ricardo Vega	UD	6 (6)	1976-03-13	Colegio Abel Bravo, Colón, Panama	
4	Win	4–0	Ulises Morales	UD	4 (4)	1976-01-31	Gimnasio Nuevo Panama, Panama City, Panama	
3	Win	3–0	Baby San Blas III	TKO	2 (4)	1975-11-29	Gimnasio Nuevo Panama, Panama City, Panama	
2	Win	2–0	Victor Barrow	UD	4 (4)	1975-10-18	Estadio Juan D. Arosemena, Panama City, Panama	
1	Win	1–0	Antonio Walker	PTS	4 (4)	1975-07-20	Gimnasio Colegio Abel Bravo, Colón, Panama	

== See also ==
- List of southpaw stance boxers
- List of world flyweight boxing champions

Sporting positions
Regional boxing titles
Preceded by Enrique Torres	Panamanian flyweight champion October 30, 1976 – 1977; Vacated	Vacant Title next held by Pedro Romero
World boxing titles
Preceded by Betulio González	WBA flyweight champion November 17, 1979 – February 17, 1980	Succeeded by Kim Tae-shik
Preceded by Santos Laciar	WBA flyweight champion June 6, 1981 – September 26, 1981	Succeeded by Juan Herrera
