= Bernabe Villacampo =

Filipino boxer

Personal information
- Nationality: Filipino
- Born: June 11, 1943 Toledo City, Cebu, Philippines
- Died: 2022-06-04 Filipinas
- Weight: Flyweight

Boxing career
- Stance: Southpaw

Boxing record
- Total fights: 65
- Wins: 39
- Win by KO: 26
- Losses: 21
- Draws: 5

Bernabe Villacampo (Filipinas June 11, 1943 – June 4, 2022) was a Philippine boxer who took the WBA World Flyweight Championship in a fifteen round Unanimous Decision on October 19, 1969 against Japanese boxer Hiroyuki Ebihara at the Prefectural Gymnasium, in Osaka, Japan. Villacampo's business manager was Lope Sarreal Jr. A strong puncher, he knocked out opponents in 40% of the matches he won.

== Early life and career ==
Villacampo started out as a vendor selling ice drops, rice puffs, and newspapers. Hawking newspapers and working as vendors were common part time professions for young boxers, and a frequent trade of American boxers in the early twentieth century. At 19, he started boxing as an amateur in tournaments representing his school, the University of Visayas, to supplement the paltry living he made as a vendor.

By the time he turned twenty in 1963, he was clearly competing as a professional. Between August 1962 and July 1965 he fought mostly in Cebu, Philippines, his hometown, or occasionally on the Philippine's big island, Luzon. He won fourteen of his first nineteen fights during this period.

Moving up in recognition and the level of his competition, he scored an upset sixth round knockout against Japanese boxer Katsuyoshi Takayama on November 6, 1967, in Okayama, Japan.

On May 15, 1968, he fought a twelve round draw for the Oriental and Pacific Boxing Federation (OPBF) Flyweight Championship against Tsuyoshi Nakamura in Tokyo, Japan.

=== Attempt at the WBC World Flyweight Championship ===
On November 10, 1968, he made an unsuccessful attempt at the WBC Flyweight Championship against Chartchai Chionoi. He lost in a fifteen round Unanimous Decision in Bangkok, Thailand. Chionoi immediately announced his retirement after the win, his fourth title defense, stating, "I am tired of the fightgame and feel sick and unwell." Chionoi did not retire and fought on to win the title two more times before finally retiring in 1974. Chionoi survived his boxing career, though suffers from Parkinson's in his retirement.

== Taking the WBA World Flyweight Championship ==
He took the WBA World Flyweight Championship in a fifteen round unanimous decision on October 19, 1969 against Japanese boxer Hiroyuki Ebihara at the Prefectural Gymnasium, in Osaka, Japan. He stunned the enthusiastic Japanese crowd in Osaka by claiming the title against the heavy hometown favorite.

=== Boxing while WBA Flyweight Champion ===
While still champion on December 14, 1969 he was defeated in a non-title fight by Masao Oba in a ten round unanimous decision in Tokyo, Japan.

On February 7, 1970, in a non-title fight in Manila he won a ten round unanimous decision against Raton Mojica of Nicaragua.

== Losing the WBA World Flyweight Championship to Berkrerk Chartvanchai ==
In his first title defense, he lost the WBA World Flyweight Championship in a close fifteen round split decision on April 5, 1970 against Thai boxer Berkrerk Chartvanchai in Bangkok, Thailand. The loss dropped Villacampo to third in the World ratings. As the Philippines was and had been an American protectorate, many American papers covered Villacampo's loss, though in short paragraphs, with minimal detail. In a close bout, the Associated Press had the scoring 73-70 for Chartvanchai. Chartvanchai used primarily body punches and solid defense to take the title. He made Villicampo miss repeatedly and scored frequently with blows to the torso. In the eighth he opened a cut above Villacampo's eye that bothered his opponent throughout the remainder of the bout. One source noted "Villicampo...was the more aggressive but could not land telling blows." Many of Chartvanchai's best scoring punches were quick strikes to the torso after breaking out of clinches.

=== Losing to Betulio Gonzalez ===
On December 21, 1970, he entered a WBA Flyweight Title Elimination tournament. In one of his most important contests, he lost a Split Decision against future 3-time world champion Betulio Gonzalez of Venezuela in Caracas. Gonzalez was the Venezuelan Flyweight Champion at the time. Had Villacampo won the bout, he would probably have had the opportunity to meet Japanese Flyweight World Title Holder Masao Ohba for the title the following year.

On May 13, 1971, he outpointed Beaver Kajimoto in a ten round bout in Tokyo, Japan.

== Boxing for the Philippine's Game and Amusement Board's Flyweight Title ==
On January 31, 1976, he lost to Rolando Navarette, in a second round TKO in Cebu, Philippines.

On June 24, 1977, he won the Philippines Games and Amusement Board's (GAB) Flyweight Title by defeating Arnel Arrozal in a fourth round technical knockout in Manila.

On March 7, 1978 he won a fourth round knockout in an important bout against 1980 World Light Flyweight Champion Shigeo Nakajima in Tokyo, Japan.

On July 1, 1978 he fought a GAB Flyweight title fight to a twelve round draw against Julius Gonzaga at Davao City, Davao del Sur, Philippines. On August 28, 1978, he relinquished the GAB Flyweight Title, the equivalent of the Philippines National Flyweight Championship to Gonzaga against at Davao City, Davao del Sur, Philippines in a seventh of twelve round knockout.

After his fifth round knockout loss on November 24, 1979 to Danilo Inocian, at Cotabato del Sur, Philippines, he retired from boxing.

== Professional boxing record ==
65 fights	39 wins	21 losses
By knockout	26	7
By decision	12	14
By disqualification	1	0
Draws	5	

No.	Result	Record	Opponent	Type	Round, time	Date	Location	Notes
65	Loss	39–21–5	Danilo Inocian	KO	4 (10)	24 Nov 1979	General Santos, Cotabato del Sur, Philippines	
64	Loss	34–20–5	Netrnoi Sor Vorasingh	TKO	5 (10)	15 Jul 1979	Bangkok, Thailand	
63	Win	39–19–5	Suvan Silpaya	KO	4	1 Jun 1979	Lumpinee Boxing Stadium, Bangkok, Thailand	
62	Loss	38–19–5	Arnel Arrozal	KO	4 (10)	7 Apr 1979	Pampanga, Philippines	
61	Loss	38–18–5	Billy Abato	TKO	8 (10)	3 Dec 1978	Cebu Coliseum, Cebu City, Philippines	
60	Loss	38–17–5	Julius Gonzaga	KO	7 (12)	28 Aug 1978	Davao City, Davao del Sur, Philippines	Lost Philippines GAB flyweight title
59	Draw	38–16–5	Julius Gonzaga	PTS	12	1 Jul 1978	Davao City, Davao del Sur, Philippines	Retained Philippines GAB flyweight title
58	Win	38–16–4	Shigeo Nakajima	KO	4 (10), 2:23	7 Mar 1978	Tokyo, Japan	
57	Win	37–16–4	Chai Yong Muangsurin	KO	4	4 Feb 1978	Cebu Coliseum, Cebu City, Philippines	
56	Win	36–16–4	Chai Yong Muangsurin	TD	2 (10)	11 Nov 1977	Cebu Coliseum, Cebu City, Philippines	
55	Win	35–16–4	Arnel Arrozal	TKO	4 (12)	24 Jun 1977	Rizal Memorial Coliseum, Manila, Philippines	Won vacant Philippines GAB flyweight title
54	Win	34–16–4	Tony Co	KO	3	19 Feb 1977	Cagayan de Oro, Misamis Oriental, Philippines	
53	Win	33–16–4	Orlando Javierto	KO	4	9 Oct 1976	Cebu, Philippines	
52	Win	32–16–4	Franco Torregoza	TKO	4	25 Aug 1976	Cagayan de Oro, Misamis Oriental, Philippines	
51	Win	31–16–4	Ernie Jun	KO	9	1 Aug 1976	Cebu, Philippines	Uncertain of date
50	Draw	30–16–4	Ben Aldeguer	PTS	10	10 Apr 1976	Cebu, Philippines	
49	Loss	30–16–3	Ernie Jun	PTS	10	1 Mar 1976	Davao City, Davao del Sur, Philippines	Uncertain of date
48	Loss	30–15–3	Rolando Navarrete	TKO	2 (10)	31 Jan 1976	Cebu City, Cebu, Philippines	
47	Win	30–14–3	Rey Naduma Jr.	KO	4	1 Dec 1975	Cebu, Philippines	Uncertain of date
46	Win	29–14–3	Eduardo Tello	KO	8	8 Sep 1971	Culiacán, Sinaloa, Mexico	
45	Loss	28–14–3	Octavio Gómez	UD	10	27 Jul 1971	Auditorio Municipal, Tijuana, Mexico	
44	Win	28–13–3	Beaver Kajimoto	PTS	10	13 May 1971	Tokyo, Japan	
43	Win	27–13–3	Kuniaki Shimada	KO	3 (10)	11 Apr 1971	Manila, Metro Manila, Philippines	
42	Loss	26–13–3	César Deciga	SD	10	20 Jan 1971	Forum, Inglewood, California, U.S.	
41	Loss	26–12–3	Betulio González	SD	12	21 Dec 1970	Nuevo Circo, Caracas, Venezuela	
40	Win	26–11–3	Baby Corona	TKO	6 (10), 2:08	28 Aug 1970	Araneta Coliseum, Quezon City, Philippines	
39	Win	25–11–3	Seiichi Watanuki	KO	8 (10)	27 Jun 1970	Manila, Metro Manila, Philippines	
38	Loss	24–11–3	Berkrerk Chartvanchai	SD	15	5 Apr 1970	Bangkok, Thailand	Lost WBA flyweight title
37	Win	24–10–3	Eduardo Mojica	UD	10	7 Feb 1970	Araneta Coliseum, Quezon City, Philippines	
36	Loss	23–10–3	Masao Ohba	UD	10	14 Dec 1969	Korakuen Hall, Tokyo, Japan	
35	Win	23–9–3	Hiroyuki Ebihara	UD	15	19 Oct 1969	Prefectural Gymnasium, Osaka, Japan	Won WBA flyweight title
34	Win	22–9–3	Yuzo Narumi	TKO	4 (12)	23 Aug 1969	Manila, Metro Manila, Philippines	
33	Loss	21–9–3	Berkrerk Chartvanchai	PTS	10	6 May 1969	Bangkok, Thailand	
32	Win	21–8–3	Fernando Atzori	KO	7 (10)	18 Jan 1969	Manila, Metro Manila, Philippines	
31	Loss	20–8–3	Chartchai Chionoi	UD	15	10 Nov 1968	Carusathiars Stadium, Bangkok, Thailand	For WBC and The Ring flyweight titles
30	Win	20–7–3	Yuzo Narumi	RTD	6 (10), 3:00	24 Jun 1968	Tokyo, Japan	
29	Draw	19–7–3	Takeshi Nakamura	SD	12	15 May 1968	Tokyo, Japan	For OPBF flyweight title
28	Win	19–7–2	Al Diaz	PTS	10	10 Feb 1968	Rizal Memorial Coliseum, Manila, Philippines	
27	Win	18–7–2	Yoshio Nakane	TKO	6 (10), 0:53	4 Dec 1967	Tokyo, Japan	
26	Win	17–7–2	Katsuyoshi Takayama	KO	6 (10), 2:21	6 Nov 1967	Prefectural Gymnasium, Okayama, Japan	
25	Win	16–7–2	Cho Dong-ki	PTS	10	30 Sep 1967	Cebu Coliseum, Cebu City, Philippines	
24	Win	15–7–2	Al Diaz	PTS	10	17 Apr 1967	Cebu, Philippines	
23	Draw	14–7–2	Manuelo Balaba	PTS	10	19 Feb 1967	Besa Boxing Arena - Plaza Lawton, Manila, Philippines	
22	Loss	14–7–1	Ric Magramo	TKO	3	30 Sep 1966	Rizal Memorial Sports Complex, Manila, Philippines	
21	Loss	14–6–1	Manuelo Balaba	PTS	10	25 Jun 1966	Cagayan de Oro, Misamis Oriental, Philippines	
20	Draw	14–5–1	Manuelo Balaba	PTS	10	19 Feb 1966	Araneta Coliseum, Quezon City, Philippines	
19	Win	14–5	Primo Famiro	DQ	10 (10)	31 Jul 1965	Cebu Coliseum, Cebu City, Philippines	
18	Loss	13–5	Jet Parker	PTS	10	15 May 1965	Cebu Coliseum, Cebu City, Philippines	
17	Win	13–4	Speedy Hayase	TKO	6 (10)	24 Apr 1965	Cebu City, Cebu, Philippines	
16	Loss	12–4	Jet Parker	MD	10	6 Mar 1965	Cebu Coliseum, Cebu City, Philippines	
15	Win	12–3	Little Paramount	PTS	10	25 Nov 1964	Cebu, Philippines	
14	Win	11–3	Rudy Billones	KO	4	7 Nov 1964	Philippines	
13	Win	10–3	Chosei Yoshino	KO	7 (10)	27 Jun 1964	Cebu Coliseum, Cebu City, Philippines	
12	Win	9–3	Young Bonnie	PTS	10	2 May 1964	Cebu City, Cebu, Philippines	
11	Loss	8–3	Little Paramount	PTS	10	4 Apr 1964	Cebu Coliseum, Cebu City, Philippines	
10	Win	8–2	Ric Magramo	PTS	10	1 Feb 1964	Cebu City, Cebu, Philippines	
9	Win	7–2	Tom Rico	PTS	10	28 Dec 1963	Philippines	
8	Loss	6–2	Primo Famiro	PTS	10	21 Sep 1963	Araneta Coliseum, Quezon City, Philippines	
7	Loss	6–1	Ric Magramo	PTS	10	10 Aug 1963	Cebu Coliseum, Cebu City, Philippines	
6	Win	6–0	Yoshio Tanaka	KO	7	10 Jun 1963	Cebu City, Cebu, Philippines	
5	Win	5–0	Litte Rufe	KO	6	20 Apr 1963	Cebu City, Cebu, Philippines	
4	Win	4–0	Yoshio Tanaka	PTS	8	29 Dec 1962	Cebu Coliseum, Cebu City, Philippines	
3	Win	3–0	Jol Cañete	TKO	4	3 Nov 1962	Cebu Coliseum, Cebu City, Philippines	
2	Win	2–0	Eddie Gonzalez	TKO	4	13 Oct 1962	Cebu Coliseum, Cebu City, Philippines	
1	Win	1–0	Arturo Acido	TKO	3 (4)	25 Aug 1962	Cebu Coliseum, Cebu City, Philippines	

== Boxing achievements and honors ==
Achievements
Preceded by Hiroyuki Ebihara	WBA World Flyweight Boxing Champion; October 19, 1969 – April 5, 1970	Succeeded by Berkrerk Chartvanchai

In another honor, Villacampo was named fighter of the month by the World Boxing Association in December 1969.
