= Francisco Quiroz =

Dominican Republic boxer (1957–1993)

Francisco Quiroz (June 4, 1957 – May 15, 1993) was a Dominican professional boxer and WBA world Light Flyweight champion. He was born in Moca, Dominican Republic.

== Professional career ==
Quiroz became a professional boxer in 1978 and captured the WBA light flyweight title with a KO win over Lupe Madera in 1984. He defended the belt once before losing to Joey Olivo in 1985. After the loss, Quiroz fought periodically in Latin America before retiring in 1990 after five consecutive losses, becoming one of the few world champions to retire with a losing record. His record was 11-15-1 with 5 wins by knockout.

== Death ==
Quiroz was killed in a nightclub brawl in 1993.

== Professional boxing record ==
28 fights	11 wins	15 losses
By knockout	5	4
By decision	6	11
Draws	1	
No contests	1	

No.	Result	Record	Opponent	Type	Round	Date	Location	Notes
28	Loss	11–15–1 (1)	Ramon Acuna	KO	1 (?)	Nov 1, 1990	Mexico	
27	Loss	11–14–1 (1)	Israel Contreras	TKO	1 (?)	Oct 8, 1988	Maiquetia, Venezuela	
26	Loss	11–13–1 (1)	Ruben Condori	PTS	10	Sep 4, 1987	Salta, Salta, Argentina	
25	Loss	11–12–1 (1)	Agustin Garcia	PTS	10	Jul 20, 1985	Plaza de Toros de Cartagena de Indias, Cartagena, Colombia	
24	Loss	11–11–1 (1)	Joey Olivo	UD	15	Mar 29, 1985	Convention Center, Miami Beach, Florida, U.S.	Lost WBA light flyweight title
23	Win	11–10–1 (1)	Victor Sierra	KO	2 (15)	Aug 18, 1984	Gimnasio Nuevo Panama, Panama City, Panama	Retained WBA light flyweight title
22	Win	10–10–1 (1)	Lupe Madera	KO	9 (15)	May 19, 1984	Maracaibo, Venezuela	Won WBA light flyweight title
21	Win	9–10–1 (1)	Reinaldo Jose Becerra	PTS	10	Oct 8, 1983	Caracas, Venezuela	
20	Win	8–10–1 (1)	Rodolfo Rodriguez	KO	2 (10)	May 30, 1983	Caracas, Venezuela	
19	Draw	7–10–1 (1)	Orlando Maestre	PTS	10	Feb 21, 1983	Valencia, Venezuela	
18	Win	7–10 (1)	Oscar Bolivar	KO	8 (?)	Dec 11, 1982	Maracaibo, Venezuela	
17	Loss	6–10 (1)	Santiago Caballero	PTS	10	Nov 20, 1982	Caracas, Venezuela	
16	NC	6–9 (1)	Eduardo Barragan	NC	?	Aug 14, 1982	Hotel del Lago Casino, Maracaibo, Venezuela	Number of rounds unknown
15	Loss	6–9	Israel Contreras	PTS	10	Jul 5, 1982	Caracas, Venezuela	
14	Loss	6–8	Rafael Orono	PTS	10	Jun 21, 1982	Cumana, Venezuela	
13	Loss	6–7	Oscar Bolivar	PTS	10	Jun 7, 1982	Caracas, Venezuela	
12	Loss	6–6	Reinaldo Jose Becerra	PTS	10	May 17, 1982	Barquisimeto, Venezuela	
11	Loss	6–5	Ramon Antonio Nery	KO	4 (?)	Mar 7, 1982	Santo Domingo, Dominican Republic	
10	Loss	6–4	Ramon Antonio Nery	KO	3 (12)	Mar 1, 1982	Santo Domingo, Dominican Republic	For vacant Dominican Republic flyweight title
9	Loss	6–3	Sugar Baby Rojas	PTS	10	Oct 30, 1981	Coliseo Humberto Perea, Barranquilla, Colombia	
8	Loss	6–2	Ramon L Perez	PTS	10	Jun 20, 1981	San Juan, Puerto Rico	
7	Loss	6–1	Ramon L Perez	PTS	10	Mar 7, 1981	San Juan, Puerto Rico	
6	Win	6–0	Quiro Hernandez	PTS	10	Nov 10, 1980	Santo Domingo, Dominican Republic	
5	Win	5–0	Elpidio de Paula	PTS	10	Sep 26, 1980	Santo Domingo, Dominican Republic	
4	Win	4–0	Felix Burgos	PTS	6	May 24, 1980	Santo Domingo, Dominican Republic	
3	Win	3–0	Pascual Polanco	PTS	6	Jul 26, 1979	Santo Domingo, Dominican Republic	
2	Win	2–0	Julo Recio	KO	4 (?)	Apr 14, 1978	Santo Domingo, Dominican Republic	
1	Win	1–0	Prudencio Castillo	PTS	4	Feb 24, 1978	Santo Domingo, Dominican Republic	

== See also ==
- List of WBA world champions

Preceded by Lupe Madera	WBA Light Flyweight Champion; 19 May 1984 – 29 Mar 1985	Succeeded by Joey Olivo
