= Kim Tae-shik =

South Korean boxer (born 1957)

Personal information
- Born: July 4, 1957 (age 69) Mukho, Gangwon Province, South Korea
- Height: 5 ft 3 1/2 in (161 cm)
- Weight: Flyweight

Korean name
- Hangul: 김태식
- Hanja: 金泰式
- RR: Gim Taesik
- MR: Kim T'aesik

Boxing career
- Stance: Orthodox

Boxing record
- Total fights: 20
- Wins: 17
- Win by KO: 13
- Losses: 3

Kim Tae-shik (Korean: 김태식; born July 4, 1957) is a South Korean former professional boxer who competed from 1977 to 1982. He held the World Boxing Association (WBA) flyweight title in 1980.

== Professional career ==
In 1980, Kim became the WBA flyweight champion with a 2-round KO win over Luis Ibarra. He defended the belt once before losing it to Peter Mathebula by a controversial 2-1, split decision in the same year.

In 1981, Kim challenged Antonio Avelar for the WBC flyweight title but was knocked out in the second round.

In 1982, Kim defeated Roberto Ramirez in a non-title bout by split decision. However, he lost consciousness within a short time after the decision. Kim was immediately taken to hospital and had emergency surgery to remove a blood clot from his brain. He spent three days in a coma, after which Kim was forced into retirement.

== Professional boxing record ==
20 fights	17 wins	3 losses
By knockout	13	2
By decision	4	1

No.	Result	Record	Opponent	Type	Round, time	Date	Location	Notes
20	Win	17–3	Roberto Ramirez	PTS	10	Sep 4, 1982	Daegu Gymnasium, Daegu, South Korea	
19	Win	16–3	Kazuyoshi Funaki	KO	5 (10)	Feb 13, 1982	Taegu Indoor Gymnasium, Daegu, South Korea	
18	Loss	15–3	Antonio Avelar	KO	2 (15)	Aug 30, 1981	Jangchung Gymnasium, Seoul, South Korea	For WBC flyweight title
17	Win	15–2	Henry Balina	KO	2 (10)	Apr 12, 1981	Munhwa Gymnasium, Seoul, South Korea	
16	Loss	14–2	Peter Mathebula	SD	15	Dec 13, 1980	Olympic Auditorium, Los Angeles, California, U.S.	Lost WBA flyweight title
15	Win	14–1	Arnel Arrozal	UD	15	Jun 29, 1980	Jangchung Gymnasium, Seoul, South Korea	Retained WBA flyweight title
14	Win	13–1	Luis Ibarra	KO	2 (15)	Feb 17, 1980	Jangchung Gymnasium, Seoul, South Korea	Won WBA flyweight title
13	Win	12–1	Chikara Igarashi	KO	4 (10)	Nov 18, 1979	Munhwa Gymnasium, Seoul, South Korea	
12	Win	11–1	William Develos	KO	5 (10)	Aug 26, 1979	Seoul, South Korea	
11	Win	10–1	Flash Jagdon	KO	2 (10)	Mar 11, 1979	Munhwa Gymnasium, Seoul, South Korea	
10	Win	9–1	Tito Abella	KO	3 (10)	Jan 14, 1979	Gudeok Gymnasium, Busan, South Korea	
9	Win	8–1	Kriengkrai Yingsak	KO	2 (10)	Nov 18, 1978	Munhwa Gymnasium, Seoul, South Korea	
8	Win	7–1	Nobuyuki Watanabe	KO	1 (10)	Aug 3, 1978	Munhwa Gymnasium, Seoul, South Korea	
7	Win	6–1	Mikio Uchida	KO	2 (10)	May 13, 1978	Munhwa Gymnasium, Seoul, South Korea	
6	Win	5–1	Chung Woon Moon	KO	3 (6)	Feb 12, 1978	Munhwa Gymnasium, Seoul, South Korea	
5	Win	4–1	Sung Kuk Lee	KO	3 (?)	Dec 24, 1977	Seoul, South Korea	
4	Win	3–1	Chong Kyu Kim	PTS	6	Dec 19, 1977	Seoul, South Korea	
3	Win	2–1	Young Shik Moon	KO	1 (4)	Dec 16, 1977	Seoul, South Korea	
2	Win	1–1	Kap Chul Shin	PTS	4	Nov 6, 1977	Munhwa Gymnasium, Seoul, South Korea	
1	Loss	0–1	Ki Bong Koh	KO	3 (4)	Sep 30, 1977	Munhwa Gymnasium, Seoul, South Korea	

== See also ==
- List of Korean boxers
- List of world flyweight boxing champions

Sporting positions
World boxing titles
Preceded by Luis Ibarra	WBA flyweight champion February 17 – December 13, 1980	Succeeded by Peter Mathebula
