= Berkrerk Chartvanchai =

Thai boxer (1944–2022)

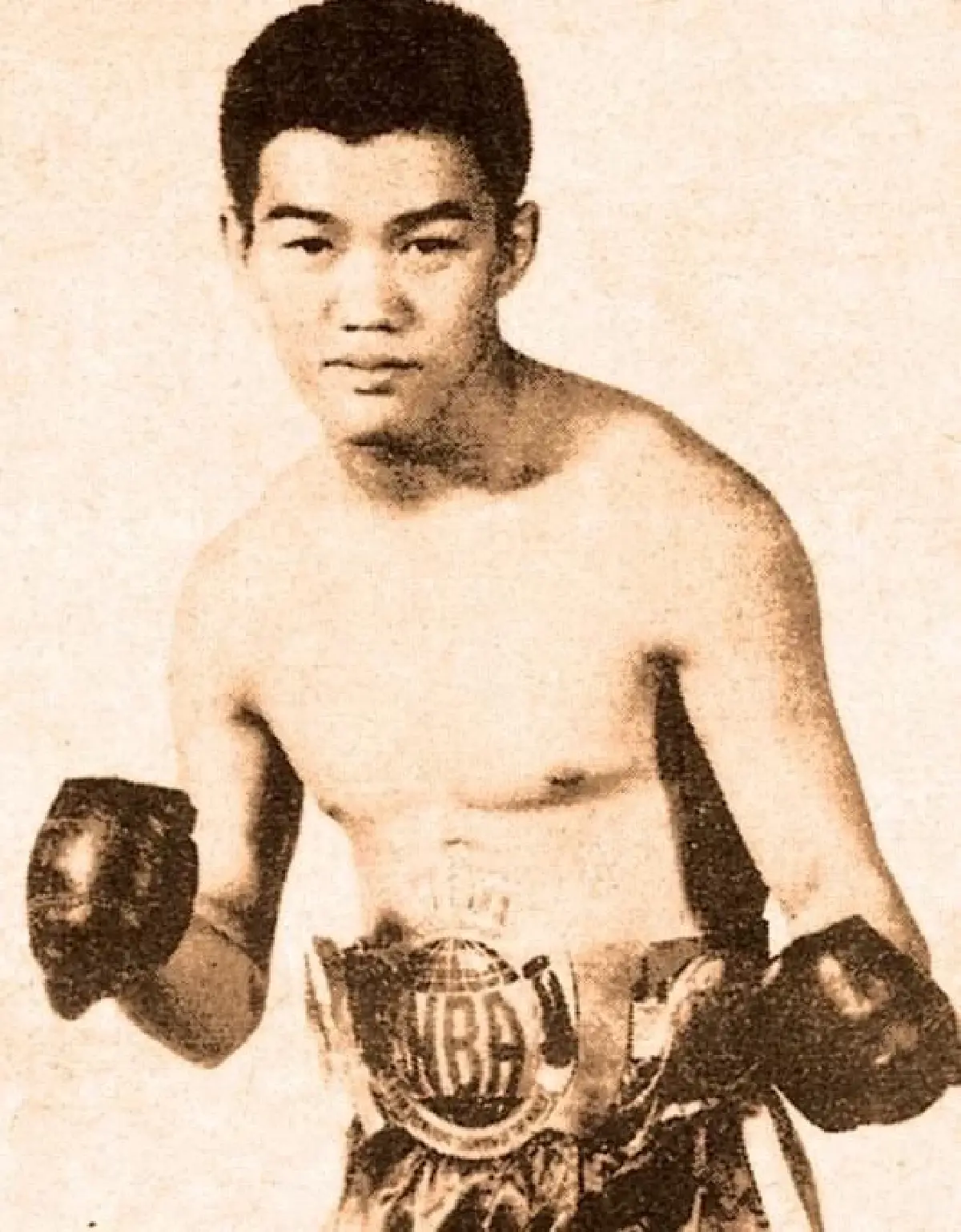
- Born: Tinapong Sae-han; October 25, 1944; Bangkok, Thailand
- Died: March 7, 2022 (aged 77)
- Native name: ติณพงษ์ แซ่ห่าน
- Other names: Tinapong Kantanakul (ติณพงษ์ กาญจนากุล); Burklerk Lookyodfah (เบิกฤกษ์ ลูกยอดฟ้า); Berkrit Singhakit (เบิกฤกษ์ สิงห์กิตติ)
- Nickname: Stinky (ไอ้เหม็น)
- Height: 168 cm (5 ft 6 in)
- Division: Light Flyweight; Flyweight; Super Flyweight; Bantamweight; Super Bantamweight
- Style: Muay Thai (Muay Khao); Boxing
- Stance: Orthodox

Professional boxing record
- Total: 24
- Wins: 16
- By knockout: 3
- Losses: 8
- By knockout: 4

Other information
- Boxing record from BoxRec

Berkrerk Chartvanchai (Thai: เบิกฤกษ์ ชาติวันชัย; October 25, 1944 – March 7, 2022) was a Thai professional Muay Thai fighter and boxer. He was a WBA World Flyweight Champion, the third Thai in history to hold a version of the World Flyweight title (The first one is Pone Kingpetch, the second is Chartchai Chionoi). In Muay Thai he was a two weight Lumpinee Stadium Champion.

== Biography and career ==
=== Early life and Muay Thai career ===
Chartvanchai was born in Thai Chinese family on October 25, 1944 in Phra Nakhon District near Memorial Bridge, Bangkok, Thailand. His real name was Tinapong Sae-han (ติณพงษ์ แซ่ห่าน) or Tinapong Hantanasirisakul (ติณพงษ์ หาญตนศิริสกุล). He started learning Muay Thai at the age of 14 from the "Sornphajon" camp and competed under the ring name "Kachachai Kingpetch". In 1962, the Lukyodfah camp was formed near his home, he moved there and was given the name "Berikrit Lukyodfah" (เบิกฤกษ์ ลูกยอดฟ้า). Later, his benefactor, Suchart Thaisit, established the Chartwanchai boxing camp with Supachai Phinthuwattana (Sarakham) as trainer.

He won the Lumpinee Stadium Flyweight championship in 1964. He then won the Lumpinee Bantamweight championship in 1966 and defended it multiple times before relinquishing his belt to switch to boxing as he was running out of opponents in Muay Thai.

=== Boxing transition ===
Berkrerk transitioned to boxing under the guidance of promoter Boonsong Kitklamsawan (head of the Srisothorn camp). He began competitive professional boxing in early 1966, and in his first twenty-seven bouts through January 1970, he won twenty-four with the remaining three as draws. Nearly all of his early bouts took place in his native Bangkok. By June 1967, he was fighting better known opponents, winning his first bout with Bernabe Villacampo on May 6, 1969, in a ten round points decision.

=== Taking the WBA World Flyweight Title ===
Chartvanchai took the WBA World Flyweight Title on April 5, 1970 against Bernabe Villacampo in a fifteen round split decision at Charusathian Stadium, Bangkok, Thailand. In a close bout, the Associated Press had the scoring 73-70 for Chartvanchai. Chartvanchai used primarily body punches and solid defense to take the title. He made Villicampo miss repeatedly and scored frequently with blows to the torso. In the eighth he opened a cut above Villacampo's eye that bothered his opponent throughout the remainder of the bout. One source noted "Villicampo...was the more aggressive but could not land telling blows." Many of Chartvanchai's best scoring punches were quick strikes to the torso after breaking out of clinches.

On July 25, 1970, in a non-title fight he lost to Filipino boxer Erbito Salavario in a non-title ten round fight in Manila. Salavario was Flyweight Champion of the Orient. Chartvantchai at 115, outweighed his opponent by two pounds.

=== Losing the WBA World Flyweight Title ===
On October 22, 1970, he lost the WBA World Flyweight Title in a thirteenth round knockout against Masao Oba in a title bout at Nichidi Auditorium in Tokyo, Japan. According to one source, the bout was postponed from its initial date when Chartvanchai took ill with a high fever. Chartvanchai was down three times in the third round before finally being called out for the full count at their bout at Nihon University. Enrique Jimenez refereed. Chartvanchai was finished off with a volley of punches to the head at 2:16 into the thirteenth round. He had trouble making the weight limit, even after doing light exercise and taking a steam bath, which may have weakened him for the bout. Oba gained a considerable lead in points throughout the match.

=== Retirement ===
After retiring he changed his real name to Berkrerk Chartvanchai. Chartvanchai studied at the Postal School, and worked as a postal employee of the Communications Authority of Thailand (CAT) until retirement in 2004. He later lived with his family at Bang Bua Thong District, Nonthaburi Province. Chartvanchai died on March 7, 2022, at the age of 77.

== Titles and accomplishments ==
=== Muay Thai ===
- Lumpinee Stadium
  - 1964 Lumpinee Stadium Flyweight (112 lbs) Champion
  - 1966 Lumpinee Stadium Bantamweight (118 lbs) title
    - Two successful title defenses

=== Boxing ===
- World Boxing Association
  - 1970 WBA Flyweight Champion

== Muay Thai record ==
Muay Thai Record
Date	Result	Opponent	Event	Location	Method	Round	Time
1973-01-15	Win	(Thailand) Chalermsak Ploenjit	Rajadamnern Stadium	Bangkok, Thailand	Decision	5	3:00
1971-10-15	Win	(Thailand) Sornnarai Lukmahlok	Lumpinee Stadium	Bangkok, Thailand	Decision	5	3:00
1968-02-26	Win	(Thailand) Sukhum Khemchart	Rajadamnern Stadium	Bangkok, Thailand	Decision	5	3:00
1967-11-04	Win	(Thailand) Weerachon Lukngamsiri	Lumpinee Stadium	Bangkok, Thailand	Decision	5	3:00
Defends the Lumpinee Stadium Bantamweight (118 lbs) title.
1967-03-28	Win	(Thailand) Weerachon Lukngamsiri	Lumpinee Stadium	Bangkok, Thailand	Decision	5	3:00
Defends the Lumpinee Stadium Bantamweight (118 lbs) title.
1967-02-21	Win	(Thailand) Sathandet Muangpathum	Lumpinee Stadium	Bangkok, Thailand	TKO	3	
1967-01-25	Win	(Thailand) Udomchai Luksuandok		Phitsanulok province, Thailand	Decision	5	3:00
1966-12-30	Win	(Thailand) Weerachon Lukngamsiri	WBA Chionoi vs McGowan, Kittikhachorn Stadium	Bangkok, Thailand	Decision	5	3:00
1966-10-18	Win	(Thailand) Lakchai Lukmatuli	Lumpinee Stadium	Bangkok, Thailand	Decision	5	3:00
Wins the Lumpinee Stadium Bantamweight (118 lbs) title.
1966-07-05	Win	(Thailand) Sathandet Muangpathum	Lumpinee Stadium	Bangkok, Thailand	Decision	5	3:00
1966-06-16	Win	(Thailand) Wiangchai Lukchaopaya	Chaopitak, Lumpinee Stadium	Bangkok, Thailand	KO	3	
1965-06-04	Win	(Thailand) Sinchainoi Laemfapha	Jompichit, Rajadamnern Stadium	Bangkok, Thailand	Decision	5	3:00
1965-04-13	Loss	(Thailand) Sornnarai Lukmahlok	Lumpinee Stadium	Bangkok, Thailand	KO (Knee to the body)	2	
1965-	Loss	(Thailand) Baiyok Laemfapha	Lumpinee Stadium	Bangkok, Thailand	Decision	5	3:00
Loses the Lumpinee Stadium Flyweight (112 lbs) title.
1965-01-26	Win	(Thailand) Kaikaew Yontrakit	Singha Asanee, Lumpinee Stadium	Bangkok, Thailand	Decision	5	3:00
1964-11-03	Win	(Thailand) Phaedcha Srichantopas	Yod Muay Thai, Lumpinee Stadium	Bangkok, Thailand	Decision	5	3:00
Defends the Lumpinee Stadium Flyweight (112 lbs) title.
1964-09-01	Win	(Thailand) Sanguansak Ittianuchit	Lumpinee Stadium	Bangkok, Thailand	KO (Elbow)	3	
1964-08-04	Win	(Thailand) Kingthong Ariphai	Chom Muay Thai, Lumpinee Stadium	Bangkok, Thailand	Decision	5	3:00
Wins the Lumpinee Stadium Flyweight (112 lbs) title.
1964-06-23	Win	(Thailand) Kaikaew Yontrakit	Singha Suradej, Lumpinee Stadium	Bangkok, Thailand	Decision	5	3:00
1964-05-19	Win	(Thailand) Chanchai Samranrat	Phruksasingh, Lumpinee Stadium	Bangkok, Thailand	Decision	5	3:00
Legend: Win Loss Draw/No contest Notes

== Professional boxing record ==
27 fights	16 wins	8 losses
By knockout	3	4
By decision	13	4
Draws	3	

No.	Result	Record	Opponent	Type	Round, time	Date	Location	Notes
24	Loss	16–8	Fernando Cabanela	KO	5 (10)	17 Dec 1973	Bangkok, Thailand	
23	Loss	16–7	Hong Soo-hwan	PTS	10	7 Oct 1973	Busan, South Korea	
22	Loss	16–6	Thanomchit Sukhothai	KO	10 (10)	31 Jul 1973	Bangkok, Thailand	
21	Loss	16–5	Zensuke Utagawa	PTS	10	7 Aug 1972	Bangkok, Thailand	
20	Win	16–5	Francisco Cruz	PTS	10	26 Jan 1972	Bangkok, Thailand	
19	Loss	15–4	Chartchai Chionoi	PTS	10	15 Nov 1971	Bangkok, Thailand	WBA flyweight title eliminator
18	Win	15–4	Yoshiaki Matsumoto	PTS	10	20 Sep 1971	Bangkok, Thailand	
17	Win	14–4	Takeo Sukegawa	TKO	8 (10)	2 Aug 1971	Bangkok, Thailand	
16	Win	13–3	Pedro Cerio	PTS	10	31 May 1971	Bangkok, Thailand	
15	Loss	12–3	Kazuyoshi Kanazawa	KO	4 (10)	1 Feb 1971	Bangkok, Thailand	
14	Loss	12–2	Masao Ohba	KO	13 (15), 2:16	22 Oct 1970	Nihon University Auditorium, Japan	Lost WBA flyweight title
13	Loss	12–1	Erbito Salavarria	UD	10	25 Jul 1970	Araneta Coliseum, Barangay Cubao, Quezon City, Philippines	
12	Win	12–0	Bernabe Villacampo	SD	15	5 Apr 1970	Bangkok, Thailand	Won WBA flyweight title
11	Win	11–0	Vil Tumulak	PTS	10	26 Jan 1970	Bangkok, Thailand	
10	Win	10–0	Felipe Gonzalez	PTS	10	13 Oct 1969	Bangkok, Thailand	
9	Win	9–0	Willy Del Prado	PTS	10	8 Aug 1969	Bangkok, Thailand	
8	Win	8–0	Kriengkrai Yingsak	PTS	10	7 Jul 1969	Rajadamnern Stadium, Bangkok, Thailand	
7	Win	7–0	Bernabe Villacampo	PTS	10	6 May 1969	Bangkok, Thailand	
6	Win	6–0	Wittayanoi Singhyodfah	KO	4 (10)	27 Mar 1969	Bangkok, Thailand	
5	Win	5–0	Ric Magramo	PTS	10	22 Jan 1969	Bangkok, Thailand	
4	Win	4–0	Jaime Pitalbo	PTS	10	13 Sep 1968	Bangkok, Thailand	
3	Win	3–0	Thawatchai Lukkarat Yothin	KO	5	11 Aug 1968	Rajadamnern Stadium, Bangkok, Thailand	
2	Win	2–0	Saknoi Sor.Kosumb	PTS	8	3 Jul 1968	Rajadamnern Stadium, Bangkok, Thailand	
1	Win	1–0	Somruk Ror.Sor.Por	KO	8	19 Dec 1967	Lumpinee Stadium, Bangkok, Thailand	

== Achievements ==
Sporting positions
World boxing titles
Preceded by Bernabe Villacampo	WBA flyweight champion April 5, 1970 – October 22, 1970	Succeeded by Masao Oba
