= Santos Laciar =

Argentine boxer (born 1959)

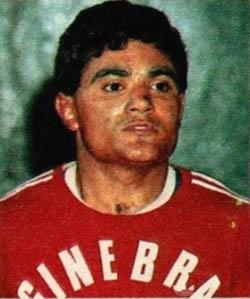
- Laciar in 1983

Personal information
- Nickname: Falucho
- Born: Santos Benigno Lacar; 31 January 1959 (age 67) Huinca Renancó, Córdoba, Argentina
- Height: 5 ft 1 in (155 cm)
- Weight: Flyweight; Super flyweight

Boxing career
- Reach: 62 1/2 in (159 cm)
- Stance: Orthodox

Boxing record
- Total fights: 101
- Wins: 79
- Win by KO: 31
- Losses: 10
- Draws: 11

Santos Benigno Laciar (born 31 January 1959), is an Argentine former professional boxer who competed from 1976 to 1990. He is a world champion in two weight classes, having held the World Boxing Association (WBA) flyweight title twice between 1981 and 1985, and the World Boxing Council (WBC) and lineal super-flyweight title in 1987.

== Biography ==
Laciar was born in Huinca Renancó, in the province of Córdoba, Argentina.

Laciar began his career in his hometown, on December 3 of 1976, knocking out Carlos Maliene in four rounds. After three more wins, all by knockout, he was faced with Alejandro Holguin, who held him to a ten-round draw, becoming the first boxer to face Laciar and not come out on the losing end. After three more wins, he drew once again, this time against Jose Ibiris, but in his next fight, he was able to take the Córdoba State Flyweight title away from Carlos Reyes Sosa in Villa María with a 12-round decision. He finished 1977 with four more wins, including a knockout in six in a rematch with Reyes Sosa.

In 1978 he had 13 fights, for an average of slightly more than one fight per month. Among his fights that year: a rematch with Ibiris, which ended in a ten-round decision win for Laciar, two fights versus contender Ramon Soria, which ended in a draw and in Laciar's first defeat, a 10-round decision loss, a fight with Luis Gerez, who drew with Laciar, and Laciar's Buenos Aires debut, a 10-round decision win over Angel Luis Fernandez.

1979 was another busy year for Laciar, boxing 13 times again during that year. He won 9 of those bouts. Among his fights in '79, a loss to future world Junior bantamweight champion Gustavo Ballas, who beat him in 10 on points, a rubber match with Ibris, resulting in another Laciar 10-round decision win, two decision losses to Raúl Pérez, and a 10-round decision win against top contender Federico Condori.

But early in 1980 Laciar started what would turn out to be a great decade for him. He was matched with Miguel Lanzarte on February 26 of that year for the vacant Argentinian flyweight title and won the bout by a decision in 12. After a draw in ten against Condori's brother Ruben, he won four straight bouts, and on August 30, he challenged for the South American flyweight title. In what was his first fight outside Argentina, he and South American champion Jaime Miranda battled to an 8-round no contest (a no contest is declared when circumstances beyond boxing cause the fight to be stopped) in Santiago, Chile. After one more win over Federico Condori, Miranda returned the favor by travelling to Laciar's country and this time, Laciar won the South American title with a 12-round decision win. Laciar finished the year by travelling to England, where he lost a 10-round decision to future world champion Charlie Magri.

In 1981, one day before his birthday, he beat Jose de la Cruz in Mar del Plata. He was already ranked number one by the WBA, and in March he flew to South Africa, where he beat Peter Mathebula on the 28th day of that month, by a knockout in seven rounds to become the world's flyweight champion. After the retirement of Carlos Monzón in 1977 and Victor Galindez in 1978, (Galindez died in 1980 in an auto race accident), Argentina was in need of a world champion boxer, and Laciar became a national hero instantly.

A rematch with Lanzarte, resulting in a 10-round non title decision win, followed, and then he fought at the Luna Park, where he lost his title to Luis Ibarra.

Ibarra lost his title in his first defense to Juan Herrera, and after 5 more bouts, Laciar challenged Herrera in the champion's hometown of Tampico, Mexico. Laciar recovered the crown by a knockout in 13 rounds, and this time, he wouldn't lose it again. He defended it for three years, after which he left it vacant. He defeated former world champion Betulio González in Maracaibo, Venezuela by a decision in 15, Steve Muchoki in Copenhagen, Denmark by a knockout in 13, Ramon Nery (a deaf-mute boxer) by a knockout in 9 at Córdoba, Shuichi Hozumi by a knockout in 2 in Japan, Hee Sup Chin, by a knockout in one in South Korea, Juan Herrera, in a rematch at Marsala, Italy, by a decision in 15, former world champion Prudencio Cardona by a knockout in 10 in Córdoba, former two-time world Junior Flyweight champion Hilario Zapata by a decision in 15 at Buenos Aires, and Antoine Monteiro, beaten by a knockout in 11 at Paris, France. After his fight with Monteiro, he decided to leave the world Flyweight championship vacant. His fame also surpassed the Argentinian borders and he became famous all over Latin America, The Ring's Spanish edition featuring him on the cover many times, as well as on posters and articles. He was also on the cover of Guantes magazine multiple times during his second period as champion.

On June 8, 1986, he and Jaime Miranda had a rubber match, Laciar winning a ten-round decision. Two months later, world Junior Bantamweight champion, Mexican Gilberto Roman, travelled to Argentina to defend his WBC and Lineal crown versus Laciar, the fight ending in a 12-round draw. Six more wins followed, including one against Hector Patri, and then on May 16 of 1987, he and Roman met again. This time the WBC chose a neutral place for the fight, but Laciar won the fight by a knockout in 11 at Reims, France, becoming a world champion for the third time. However, in his first title defense, Laciar was on the losing end of a decision against Colombian Sugar Baby Rojas in Miami.

Laciar kept on boxing and reeled off eight more straight wins, but on October 8, 1988, he was outpointed by Juan Carazo in Caguas, Puerto Rico, by a decision in 12 rounds. Two more wins and another no contest followed, and, after Carazo lost in his title try against Roman by decision, it was Laciar's turn to face the Mexican again. This time, they boxed in the Los Angeles suburb of Inglewood, California, and Roman came out victorious by a 12-round decision.

Roman would die in a car crash the next year, and all chances of a fourth bout between the two, which was a possibility that was being talked about, were dashed with Roman's death.

Laciar fought three more bouts, all in 1990, after which he decided to retire. A world-traveling boxer, Laciar had fights in twelve countries, not counting fights held at his native Argentina. The countries he visited as a professional boxer to fight at were, in the following order, Chile, the United Kingdom (specifically, England), South Africa, Mexico, Venezuela, Denmark, Japan, South Korea, Italy, France, the United States and Puerto Rico.

His final record was 79 wins, 10 losses, 11 draws and 1 fight ended in a no-contest, with 31 wins coming by knockout.

== After retirement ==
Laciar became an occasional boxing commentator for TyC Sports's Saturday night boxing show, Boxeo de Primera.

== Professional boxing record ==
101 fights	79 wins	10 losses
By knockout	31	0
By decision	48	10
Draws	11	
No contests	1	

No.	Result	Record	Opponent	Type	Round, time	Date	Location	Notes
101	Loss	79–10–11 (1)	Hugo Soto	UD	10	21 Dec 1990	Catamarca, Argentina	
100	Win	79–9–11 (1)	Ruben Condori	PTS	10	15 Sep 1990	Presidencia Roque Saenz Pena, Argentina	
99	Win	78–9–11 (1)	Juan Carlos Cortes	UD	10	27 Apr 1990	Laguna Larga, Argentina	
98	Loss	77–9–11 (1)	Gilberto Román	UD	12	12 Sep 1989	Great Western Forum, Inglewood, California, U.S.	For WBC super flyweight title
97	Win	77–8–11 (1)	Hugo Gomez	PTS	10	6 Apr 1989	Villa Carlos Paz, Argentina	
96	Win	76–8–11 (1)	Jesús Moreno	KO	3 (10)	18 Feb 1989	Villa Carlos Paz, Argentina	
95	NC	75–8–11 (1)	Raúl Ojeda	NC	1 (10)	7 Jan 1989	Villa Carlos Paz, Argentina	
94	Loss	75–8–11	Juan Carazo	SD	12	8 Oct 1988	Caguas, Puerto Rico	WBC super flyweight title eliminator
93	Win	75–7–11	Alejandrino Castaño	KO	5 (10)	24 Jun 1988	Justiniano Posse, Argentina	
92	Win	74–7–11	Ricardo Escobar Baez	PTS	10	10 Jun 1988	Viedma, Argentina	
91	Win	73–7–11	Luis Alberto Ocampo	RTD	6 (10)	7 May 1988	Buenos Aires, Argentina	
90	Win	72–7–11	Ricardo Escobar Baez	PTS	10	15 Apr 1988	Pico Truncado, Argentina	
89	Win	71–7–11	José Narvaez	PTS	10	2 Apr 1988	San Luis, Argentina	
88	Win	70–7–11	Bernardo Mendoza	KO	3 (10)	5 Mar 1988	Buenos Aires, Argentina	
87	Win	69–7–11	Juan Alberto Ivalo	KO	6 (10)	17 Feb 1988	Mar del Plata, Argentina	
86	Win	68–7–11	José Narvaez	PTS	10	10 Dec 1987	Buenos Aires, Argentina	
85	Loss	67–7–11	Sugar Baby Rojas	UD	12	8 Aug 1987	Tamiami Fairgrounds Auditorium, Miami, Florida, U.S.	Lost WBC and lineal super flyweight title
84	Win	67–6–11	Gilberto Román	TKO	11 (12), 1:10	16 May 1987	Salle René-Tys, Reims, France	Won WBC and lineal super flyweight title
83	Win	66–6–11	Alejandro Vazquez	KO	2 (10)	14 Apr 1987	Trelew, Argentina	
82	Win	65–6–11	Isaias Carvacho	KO	4 (10)	21 Mar 1987	Esquel, Argentina	
81	Win	64–6–11	José Narvaez	PTS	10	5 Mar 1987	La Rioja, Argentina	
80	Win	63–6–11	Hector Patri	PTS	10	30 Jan 1987	Mar del Plata, Argentina	
79	Win	62–6–11	Oscar Bolivar	PTS	10	8 Nov 1986	Estadio Luna Park, Buenos Aires, Argentina	
78	Win	61–6–11	José Narvaez	PTS	10	24 Oct 1986	Concepcion, Argentina	
77	Draw	60–6–11	Gilberto Román	PTS	12	30 Aug 1986	Pabellon Verde, Cordoba, Argentina	For WBC super flyweight title
76	Win	60–6–10	Alberto Pacheco	KO	8 (10)	17 Jul 1986	Santa Fe, Argentina	
75	Win	59–6–10	Jaime Miranda	PTS	10	8 Jun 1986	Estadio Luna Park, Buenos Aires, Argentina	
74	Win	58–6–10	Antoine Montero	UD	15	6 May 1985	Palais des Sports, Grenoble, France	Retained WBA flyweight title
73	Win	57–6–10	Hilario Zapata	UD	15	8 Dec 1984	Estadio Luna Park, Buenos Aires, Argentina	Retained WBA flyweight title
72	Win	56–6–10	Prudencio Cardona	KO	10 (15)	15 Sep 1984	Pabellon Verde, Cordoba, Argentina	Retained WBA flyweight title
71	Win	55–6–10	Juan Herrera	SD	15	28 Jan 1984	Palazzo Dello Sport, Marsala, Italy	Retained WBA flyweight title
70	Win	54–6–10	Juan Carlos Cortes	PTS	10	16 Dec 198	Cordoba, Argentina	
69	Win	53–6–10	Shin Hi-sup	TKO	1 (15), 1:19	17 Jul 1983	Halla Gym, Jeju, South Korea	Retained WBA flyweight title
68	Win	52–6–10	Shuichi Hozumi	TKO	2 (15), 2:52	5 May 1983	Sangyokan Gym, Shizuoka, Japan	Retained WBA flyweight title
67	Win	51–6–10	Ramón Nery	TKO	9 (15), 1:25	4 Mar 1983	Estadio Chateau Carreras, Cordoba, Argentina	Retained WBA flyweight title
66	Win	50–6–10	Rodolfo Rodriguez	PTS	10	18 Dec 1982	Estadio Luna Park, Buenos Aires, Argentina	
65	Win	49–6–10	Steve Muchoki	TKO	13 (15)	5 Nov 1982	K.B. Hallen, Copenhagen, Denmark	Retained WBA flyweight title
64	Win	48–6–10	Ramón Albers	TKO	5 (10)	9 Oct 1982	Monteros, Argentina	
63	Win	47–6–10	Betulio González	SD	15	14 Aug 1982	Hotel del Lago Casino, Maracaibo, Venezuela	Retained WBA flyweight title
62	Win	46–6–10	José Gomez	PTS	10	22 Jul 1982	Villa Carlos Paz, Argentina	
61	Win	45–6–10	Mario Paniagua	PTS	10	8 Jul 1982	Cordoba, Argentina	
60	Win	44–6–10	Domingo Aragón	PTS	10	11 Jun 1982	Huinca Renanco, Argentina	
59	Win	43–6–10	Juan Herrera	TKO	13 (15), 2:35	1 May 1982	Carte Clara Baseball Park, Merida, Mexico	Won WBA flyweight title
58	Draw	42–6–10	Rodolfo Rodriguez	PTS	10	7 Nov 1981	Estadio Luna Park, Buenos Aires, Argentina	
57	Win	42–6–9	Miguel Angel Lazarte	PTS	10	18 Sep 1981	San Miguel, Argentina	
56	Draw	41–6–9	Ruben Condori	PTS	10	18 Sep 1981	Cordoba, Argentina	
55	Win	41–6–8	Domingo Aragón	PTS	10	4 Sep 1981	Morteros, Argentina	
54	Draw	40–6–8	Rodolfo Rodriguez	PTS	10	22 Aug 1981	Estadio Luna Park, Buenos Aires, Argentina	
53	Loss	40–6–7	Luis Ibarra	UD	15	6 Jun 1981	Estadio Luna Park, Buenos Aires, Argentina	Lost WBA flyweight title
52	Win	40–5–7	Miguel Angel Lazarte	PTS	10	8 May 1981	Cordoba, Argentina	
51	Win	39–5–7	Peter Mathebula	TKO	7 (15), 2:02	28 Mar 1981	Orlando Stadium, Johannesburg, South Africa	Won WBA flyweight title
50	Win	38–5–7	José De La Cruz López	PTS	10	30 Jan 1981	Mar del Plata, Argentina	
49	Loss	37–5–7	Charlie Magri	PTS	12	8 Dec 1980	Royal Albert Hall, Kensington, England, U.K.	
48	Win	37–4–7	Jaime Miranda	PTS	12	22 Nov 1980	Villa Carlos Paz, Argentina	Won South American flyweight title
47	Win	36–4–7	Federico Condori	PTS	10	6 Nov 1980	Huinca Renanco, Argentina	
46	Draw	35–4–7	Jaime Miranda	TD	8 (12)	27 Aug 1980	Santiago, Chile	For South American flyweight title
45	Win	35–4–6	Miguel Angel Velez	RTD	6 (10)	22 Jul 1980	Villa Carlos Paz, Argentina	
44	Win	34–4–6	Adrian Roman	KO	3 (10)	6 Jun 1980	Villa Maria, Argentina	
43	Win	33–4–6	Juan José Brizuela	PTS	10	9 May 1980	Cordoba, Argentina	
42	Win	32–4–6	Domingo Aragón	PTS	10	18 Apr 1980	Cordoba, Argentina	
41	Draw	31–4–6	Ruben Condori	PTS	10	28 Mar 1980	Cordoba, Argentina	
40	Win	31–4–5	Miguel Angel Lazarte	PTS	12	27 Feb 1980	Villa Carlos Paz, Argentina	Won vacant Argentine flyweight title
39	Win	30–4–5	Federico Condori	PTS	10	7 Dec 1979	Villa Carlos Paz, Argentina	
38	Loss	29–4–5	Gustavo Ballas	PTS	10	3 Nov 1979	Estadio Luna Park, Buenos Aires, Argentina	
37	Win	29–3–5	Hector Velazquez	PTS	10	12 Oct 1979	Cordoba, Argentina	
36	Win	28–3–5	Luis Gomez	PTS	10	6 Sep 1979	Villa Carlos Paz, Argentina	
35	Draw	27–3–5	Miguel Angel Lazarte	PTS	10	22 Aug 1979	Villa Carlos Paz, Argentina	
34	Win	27–3–4	Juan Espíndola	PTS	10	22 Jun 1979	Cordoba, Argentina	
33	Loss	26–3–4	Raúl Perez	PTS	10	25 May 1979	Villa Carlos Paz, Argentina	
32	Win	26–2–4	José Flores	TKO	7 (10)	26 Apr 1979	Villa Carlos Paz, Argentina	
31	Win	25–2–4	Gilberto Lopez	PTS	10	11 Apr 1979	Villa Carlos Paz, Argentina	
30	Loss	24–2–4	Raúl Perez	PTS	10	16 Mar 1979	Huinca Renanco, Argentina	
29	Win	24–1–4	Juan Carlos Rios	PTS	10	9 Feb 1979	Villa Carlos Paz, Argentina	
28	Win	23–1–4	José Ibiris	PTS	10	26 Jan 1979	Villa Carlos Paz, Argentina	
27	Win	22–1–4	Raúl Perez	PTS	10	14 Dec 1978	Villa Carlos Paz, Argentina	Not to be confused with Raúl Pérez
26	Loss	21–1–4	Ramon Soria	PTS	10	1 Dec 1978	Ciudad Mendoza, Argentina	
25	Win	21–0–4	Felipe Rojas	KO	5 (10)	9 Nov 1978	Villa Carlos Paz, Argentina	
24	Win	20–0–4	Angel Lois Fernandez	PTS	10	21 Oct 1978	Estadio Luna Park, Buenos Aires, Argentina	
23	Draw	19–0–4	Luis Gerez	PTS	10	6 Oct 1978	Villa Maria, Argentina	
22	Win	19–0–3	José Lopez	TKO	4 (10)	20 Sep 1978	Villa Carlos Paz, Argentina	
21	Win	18–0–3	José Izquierdo	PTS	10	6 Sep 1978	Villa Carlos Paz, Argentina	
20	Win	17–0–3	Hector Barreto	PTS	10	8 Jul 1978	Huinca Renanco, Argentina	
19	Win	16–0–3	Reynaldo Romero	PTS	10	2 Jun 1978	Realico, Argentina	
18	Win	15–0–3	Carlos Aguero	PTS	10	19 May 1978	Huinca Renanco, Argentina	
17	Draw	14–0–3	Ramon Soria	PTS	10	14 Apr 1978	Huinca Renanco, Argentina	
16	Win	14–0–2	José Ibiris	PTS	10	10 Feb 1978	Huinca Renanco, Argentina	
15	Win	13–0–2	Luis Gerez	PTS	10	13 Jan 1978	} Huinca Renanco, Argentina	
14	Win	12–0–2	Enrique Navarro	TKO	6 (10)	17 Dec 1977	Realico, Argentina	
13	Win	11–0–2	José Izquierdo	PTS	10	4 Nov 1977	Huinca Renanco, Argentina	
12	Win	10–0–2	Carlos Reyes Sosa	RTD	6 (10)	22 Oct 1977	Villa Carlos Paz, Argentina	
11	Win	9–0–2	Manuel Quinteros	RTD	8 (10)	30 Sep 1977	Huinca Renanco, Argentina	
10	Win	8–0–2	Carlos Reyes Sosa	PTS	12	9 Sep 1977	Villa Maria, Argentina	
9	Draw	7–0–2	José Ibiris	PTS	10	8 Jul 1977	Huinca Renanco, Argentina	
8	Win	7–0–1	José Zárate	KO	1 (10)	18 Jun 1977	Huinca Renanco, Argentina	
7	Win	6–0–1	José Izquierdo	PTS	10	7 May 1977	Realico, Argentina	
6	Win	5–0–1	Alberto Martin	PTS	10	22 Apr 1977	Huinca Renanco, Argentina	
5	Draw	4–0–1	Alejandro Olguin	PTS	10	26 Mar 1977	Huinca Renanco, Argentina	
4	Win	4–0	José Flores	KO	4 (6)	25 Feb 1977	Huinca Renanco, Argentina	
3	Win	3–0	Amado Chavez	TKO	5 (6)	5 Feb 1977	Realico, Argentina	
2	Win	2–0	Angel Pereyra	TKO	4 (6)	15 Jan 1977	Huinca Renanco, Argentina	
1	Win	1–0	Carlos Maliene	KO	4 (6)	3 Dec 1976	Huinca Renanco, Argentina	

== Titles in boxing ==
=== Major world titles ===
- WBA flyweight champion (112 lbs) (2x)
- WBC super flyweight champion (115 lbs)

=== Regional/International titles ===
- South American flyweight champion]] (112 lbs)

== See also ==
- List of world flyweight boxing champions
- List of world super-flyweight boxing champions

Sporting positions
Regional boxing titles
Vacant Title last held by Luis Tapias	South American flyweight champion 22 November 1980 – 1980; Vacated	Vacant Title next held by Ruben Condori
World boxing titles
Preceded by Peter Mathebula	WBA flyweight champion 28 March - 6 June 1981	Succeeded by Luis Ibarra
Preceded by Juan Herrera	WBA flyweight champion 1 May 1982 - 29 July 1985; Vacated	Vacant Title next held by Hilario Zapata
Preceded by Gilberto Román	WBC super flyweight champion 16 May – 8 August 1987	Succeeded by Sugar Baby Rojas
Awards
Previous: Marcelo Alexandre	Olimpia de Oro; 1982 – 1984	Next: Hugo Porta
Previous: Carlos Monzón	Konex de Platino; 1990	Next: Julio César Vásquez
