= Shigeo Nakajima =

Japanese boxer

Shigeo Nakajima 中島 成雄
Personal information
- Nationality: Japanese
- Born: January 16, 1954 (age 72) Yūki, Ibaraki, Japan
- Height: 5 ft 3 in (160 cm)
- Weight: Light flyweight

Boxing career
- Reach: 61 1/2 in (156 cm)
- Stance: Orthodox

Boxing record
- Total fights: 19
- Wins: 13
- Win by KO: 7
- Losses: 5
- Draws: 1

Shigeo Nakajima (中島 成雄, Nakajima Shigeo; born January 16, 1954) is a retired Japanese boxer who is a former WBC junior flyweight champion. He is an alumnus of the Komazawa University.

Nakajima began boxing at Yonekura Boxing Gym at the age of a high school student. He compiled an amateur record of 80–15 (48 KOs) before turning professional.

== Professional career ==
Nakajima made his professional debut with a second-round knockout victory at the Korakuen Hall in Tokyo in July 1976, and won over the reigning Japanese junior flyweight champion Kazunori Tenryū via a third-round knockout in a non-title ten round bout in August 1977. However, he was knocked out by the former WBA flyweight champion Bernabe Villacampo with a body blow in the fourth round in March 1978. He lost on points to the future WBA junior flyweight champion Hwan-Jin Kim in August of that year.

On January 3, 1980, Nakajima fought against Kim Sung-Jun for the WBC junior flyweight title at the Korakuen Hall. Preparing for that fight, Joe Koizumi who is familiar with boxing theory and was later inducted into the International Boxing Hall of Fame and the World Boxing Hall of Fame, served as Nakajima's trainer. The gym's president Kenji Yonekura made him move to an apartment near his residence, and woke him up every morning to make him do his roadwork. In the third round, his eardrum was perforated and his ribs cracked, and he suffered a cut above his left eye. Nevertheless, Nakajima was crowned the title via a unanimous decision with his quick blows and footwork.

In his first defense in March 1980, he lost to Hilario Zapata via a close unanimous decision at the Kuramae Kokugikan in Tokyo. Yonekura protested that decision of the judges. Yet Nakajima was stopped in the eleventh round of the rematch with Zapata for that title at the Civic Center in Gifu city in September of the same year. After eight months, Nakajima suffered an eight-round knockout loss, and quit boxing.

== Professional boxing record ==
| 19 fights | 13 wins | 5 losses |
|---|---|---|
| By knockout | 7 | 3 |
| By decision | 6 | 2 |
| Draws | 1 | |

| No. | Result | Record | Opponent | Type | Round, time | Date | Location | Notes |
|---|---|---|---|---|---|---|---|---|
| 19 | Loss | 13–5–1 | Nobuyuki Watanabe | KO | 8 (10) | 1981-05-26 | Korakuen Hall, Tokyo, Japan | |
| 18 | Loss | 13–4–1 | Hilario Zapata | TKO | 11 (15) | 1980-09-17 | Civic Center, Gifu, Japan | For WBC light flyweight title |
| 17 | Loss | 13–3–1 | Hilario Zapata | UD | 15 (15) | 1980-03-24 | Kokugikan, Tokyo, Japan | Lost WBC light flyweight title |
| 16 | Win | 13–2–1 | Kim Sung-jun | UD | 15 (15) | 1980-01-03 | Korakuen Hall, Tokyo, Japan | Won WBC light flyweight title |
| 15 | Win | 12–2–1 | Hong Soo Yang | MD | 10 (10) | 1979-11-06 | Japan | |
| 14 | Win | 11–2–1 | Kubomura Tomihisa | KO | 3 (10) | 1979-06-12 | Korakuen Hall, Tokyo, Japan | |
| 13 | Win | 10–2–1 | Marciano Sekiyama | KO | 7 (10) | 1979-03-27 | Japan | |
| 12 | Loss | 9–2–1 | Kim Hwan-jin | PTS | 10 (10) | 1978-08-29 | Japan | |
| 11 | Win | 9–1–1 | Puma Koya | PTS | 10 (10) | 1978-06-30 | Japan | |
| 10 | Loss | 8–1–1 | Bernabe Villacampo | KO | 4 (10) | 1978-03-07 | Japan | |
| 9 | Win | 8–0–1 | Yukimitsu Kondo | KO | 3 (10) | 1978-01-24 | Japan | |
| 8 | Win | 7–0–1 | Torayuki Nanasha | KO | 4 (10) | 1977-11-29 | Korakuen Hall, Tokyo, Japan | |
| 7 | Win | 6–0–1 | Kazunori Tenryu | KO | 3 (10) | 1977-08-23 | Korakuen Hall, Tokyo, Japan | |
| 6 | Win | 5–0–1 | Koichi Maki | MD | 10 (10) | 1977-06-21 | Japan | |
| 5 | Win | 4–0–1 | Masayuki Kobayashi | PTS | 10 (10) | 1977-04-02 | Kokugikan, Tokyo, Japan | |
| 4 | Win | 3–0–1 | Beaver Kajimoto | PTS | 10 (10) | 1976-12-14 | Korakuen Hall, Tokyo, Japan | |
| 3 | Win | 2–0–1 | Toshiro Fujii | KO | 5 (8) | 1976-10-12 | Korakuen Hall, Tokyo, Japan | |
| 2 | Draw | 1–0–1 | Chi Bok Kim | PTS | 8 (8) | 1976-09-16 | Busan, South Korea | |
| 1 | Win | 1–0 | Shigeo Maezawa | KO | 2 (6) | 1976-07-12 | Japan | |

== Later life ==
Nakajima once serves as the president of the golf course development company, and currently acts as the executive secretary of the Pro Boxing World Champions party which is the internal organization of the Japan Pro Boxing Association (JPBA) consisting of Japan's world champions for the social contributions.

== See also ==
- Boxing in Japan
- List of Japanese boxing world champions
- List of world light-flyweight boxing champions

== Bibliography ==
- Boxing Magazine editorial department, ed. (May 31, 2002). 日本プロボクシング史 世界タイトルマッチで見る50年 (Japan Pro Boxing History – 50 Years of World Title Bouts) (in Japanese). Tokyo, Japan: Baseball Magazine Sha Co., Ltd. pp. 50–52, 297. ISBN 978-4-583-03695-3.

Sporting positions
World boxing titles
| Preceded by Kim Sung-jun | WBC light flyweight champion January 3, 1980 – March 24, 1980 | Succeeded by Hilario Zapata |
