= Peter Mathebula =

South African boxer (1952–2020)

Personal information
- Nickname: Terror
- Born: 3 July 1952 Mohlakeng, Gauteng, South Africa
- Died: 18 January 2020 (aged 67) Krugersdorp, Gauteng, South Africa
- Weight: Flyweight; Bantamweight

Boxing career
- Stance: Orthodox

Boxing record
- Total fights: 45
- Wins: 36
- Win by KO: 17
- Losses: 9

Peter Mathebula (3 July 1952 – 18 January 2020) was a South African professional boxer who held the WBA flyweight title from 1980 to 1981.

== Biography ==
After he began his professional career in 1971, Mathebula became South African flyweight champion in 1978 and bantamweight champion in 1979. In 1980 Mathebula would go on to make history by becoming the first black South African to win a world title after his victory over Kim Tae-shik. He would lose the title in his first defense to Santos Laciar on 28 March 1981.

== Professional boxing record ==
45 fights	36 wins	9 losses
By knockout	17	5
By decision	19	4

No.	Result	Record	Opponent	Type	Round, time	Date	Location	Notes
45	Win	36–9	Jacob Molefe	TKO	10 (10)	1983-08-12	Mphatlalatsane Amphitheatre, Sebokeng, South Africa	
44	Win	35–9	Mandla Booi	PTS	8 (8)	1983-04-16	Mdantsane Stadium, East London, South Africa	
43	Win	34–9	Siphiwo Fuma	PTS	8 (8)	1982-10-02	Mdantsane Stadium, East London, South Africa	
42	Loss	33–9	Matata Plaatjies	PTS	10 (10)	1982-07-05	Good Hope Centre, Cape Town, South Africa	
41	Win	33–8	Welile Nkosinkulu	KO	7 (10)	1982-04-14	Good Hope Centre, Cape Town, South Africa	
40	Win	32–8	Joseph Ngubane	PTS	8 (8)	1982-03-15	West Ridge Tennis Stadium, Durban, South Africa	
39	Loss	31–8	Betulio González	KO	6 (10)	1981-10-04	Maracay, Venezuela	
38	Loss	31–7	Betulio González	TKO	10 (10)	1981-06-21	Maracaibo, Venezuela	
37	Loss	31–6	Santos Laciar	TKO	7 (15)	1981-03-28	Orlando Stadium, Soweto, South Africa	Lost WBA flyweight title
36	Win	31–5	Kim Tae-shik	SD	15 (15)	1980-12-13	Olympic Auditorium, Los Angeles, California, U.S.	Won WBA flyweight title
35	Win	30–5	Johannes Sithebe	RTD	9 (12)	1980-09-20	Jabulani Amphitheatre, Soweto, South Africa	Retained South African flyweight title
34	Win	29–5	Godfrey Nkate	KO	4 (12)	1980-03-28	Kwa Thema Civic Centre, Springs, South Africa	Retained South African flyweight title
33	Loss	28–5	Welile Nkosinkulu	TKO	9 (12)	1979-12-08	Mdantsane Stadium, East London, South Africa	Lost South African bantamweight title
32	Win	28–4	Monde Mpulampula	KO	2 (10)	1979-09-29	Mdantsane Stadium, East London, South Africa	
31	Win	27–4	Vincent Ngcobo	TKO	5 (12)	1979-09-07	Kwa Thema Civic Centre, Springs, South Africa	Retained South African bantamweight title
30	Win	26–4	Phindile Gaika	TKO	9 (12)	1979-04-07	Showgrounds Hall, Port Elizabeth, South Africa	Retained South African flyweight title
29	Win	25–4	Leslie Pikoli	KO	8 (12)	1979-02-03	Showgrounds Hall, Port Elizabeth, South Africa	Won vacant South African bantamweight title
28	Win	24–4	Johannes Sithebe	PTS	6 (6)	1978-12-04	Curries Fountain, Durban, South Africa	
27	Win	23–4	Phindile Gaika	RTD	5 (8)	1978-08-26	Mdantsane Stadium, East London, South Africa	
26	Win	22–4	Johannes Sithebe	PTS	12 (12)	1978-04-29	Ellis Park Tennis Stadium, Johannesburg, South Africa	Won vacant South African flyweight title
25	Win	21–4	Johannes Sithebe	PTS	12 (12)	1977-11-28	West Ridge Tennis Stadium, Durban, South Africa	Retained Non White South African flyweight title
24	Win	20–4	Reuben Matewu	KO	1 (8)	1977-10-15	Mdantsane Stadium, East London, South Africa	
23	Win	19–4	Blessing Vezi	TKO	1 (8)	1977-10-03	West Ridge Tennis Stadium, Durban, South Africa	
22	Loss	18–4	Freddy Hernandez	PTS	10 (10)	1977-05-21	Wembley Stadium, Johannesburg, South Africa	
21	Win	18–3	Joe N'Gidi Junior	RTD	7 (12)	1977-05-09	West Ridge Tennis Stadium, Durban, South Africa	Retained Non White South African flyweight title
20	Win	17–3	Daniel Hlahane	PTS	6 (6)	1977-04-16	Wembley Stadium, Johannesburg, South Africa	
19	Win	16–3	Johannes Sithebe	PTS	12 (12)	1977-03-04	Loftus Versfeld Stadium, Pretoria, South Africa	Retained Non White South African flyweight title
18	Win	15–3	Leslie Pikoli	PTS	8 (8)	1976-07-17	Centenary Hall, New Brighton, South Africa	
17	Win	14–3	Richard Bassie Modise	PTS	6 (6)	1976-06-05	Jabulani Amphitheatre, Soweto, South Africa	
16	Win	13–3	Joe N'Gidi Junior	KO	10 (12)	1976-05-01	Curries Fountain, Durban, South Africa	Won Non White South African flyweight title
15	Win	12–3	Johannes Sithebe	PTS	10 (10)	1975-11-07	Boiketlong Hall, Soweto, South Africa	Retained Non White Transvaal flyweight title
14	Win	11–3	William Matlokotsi	TKO	4 (8)	1975-07-11	Uncle Tom's Hall, Orlando, South Africa	
13	Win	10–3	William Molatudi	PTS	10 (10)	1975-06-06	Kwa Thema Civic Centre, Springs, South Africa	Retained Non White Transvaal flyweight title
12	Win	9–3	Johannes Sithebe	PTS	10 (10)	1975-04-25	Boiketlong Hall, Soweto, South Africa	Won vacant Non White Transvaal flyweight title
11	Win	8–3	MacDonald Mpanza	KO	1 (8)	1975-02-21	Uncle Tom's Hall, Orlando, South Africa	
10	Win	7–3	Abendigo Hlape	TKO	2 (6)	1974-11-15	Uncle Tom's Hall, Orlando, South Africa	
9	Win	6–3	David Moyo	PTS	6 (6)	1974-08-30	Uncle Tom's Hall, Orlando, South Africa	
8	Loss	5–3	Joe N'Gidi Junior	TKO	4 (8)	1974-06-29	Curries Fountain, Durban, South Africa	
7	Win	5–2	Paulus Tshehla	PTS	4 (4)	1974-05-10	Mamelodi Community Hall, Pretoria, South Africa	
6	Win	4–2	Esau Lekepetsi	KO	1 (6)	1974-02-22	Dobsonville Community Hall, Soweto, South Africa	
5	Win	3–2	Joe N'Gidi Junior	PTS	6 (6)	1973-03-31	Curries Fountain, Durban, South Africa	
4	Loss	2–2	William Sefefe	PTS	4 (4)	1972-09-15	Dobsonville Community Hall, Soweto, South Africa	
3	Loss	2–1	Daniel Hlahane	PTS	4 (4)	1972-06-23	Boiketlong Hall, Soweto, South Africa	
2	Win	2–0	Alois Mvundla	PTS	4 (4)	1972-02-11	Boiketlong Hall, Soweto, South Africa	
1	Win	1–0	Sydwell Mhlongo	PTS	4 (4)	1971-07-10	Rabosotho Hall, Thembisa, South Africa	

== Death ==
Mathebula died in January 2020. Peter's wife Emma Mathebula, died on the eve of his funeral on 23 January 2020.

== See also ==
- List of world flyweight boxing champions

Sporting positions
Regional boxing titles
Vacant Title last held by William Molatudi	Non White Transvaal province flyweight champion April 25, 1975 – 1976; Vacated	Vacant Title next held by Johannes Sithebe
Preceded by Joe N'Gidi Junior	Non White South African flyweight champion May 1, 1976 – 1977; Vacated	Title discontinued
Vacant Title last held by Graham van der Walt	South African flyweight champion April 29, 1978 – 1980; Vacated	Vacant Title next held by Johannes Miya
Vacant Title last held by Arnold Taylor	South African bantamweight champion February 3, 1979 – December 8, 1979	Succeeded by Welile Nkosinkulu
World boxing titles
Preceded by Kim Tae-shik	WBA flyweight champion December 13, 1980 – March 28, 1981	Succeeded by Santos Laciar
