= Kim Sung-jun (boxer) =

South Korean boxer (1953–1989)

Personal information
- Nationality: South Korean
- Born: June 3, 1953 Busan, South Korea
- Died: February 3, 1989 (aged 35) Seoul, South Korea
- Height: 5 ft 2 1/2 in (159 cm)
- Weight: Light flyweight; Flyweight

Boxing career
- Stance: Orthodox

Boxing record
- Total fights: 48
- Wins: 28
- Win by KO: 13
- Losses: 14
- Draws: 6

Kim Sung-Jun (Korean: 김성준; Hanja: 金性俊; June 3, 1953 – February 3, 1989) was a boxer from South Korea.

== Professional career ==
In January, 1978, he won the Orient and Pacific Boxing Federation light flyweight title.

In September, 1978, Kim became the WBC light flyweight champion with a KO win over Netrnoi Sor Vorasingh. He defended the belt three times before losing it to Shigeo Nakajima in January, 1980.

In July, 1980, Kim unsuccessfully challenged Shoji Oguma for the WBC flyweight title, losing by a split decision.

== Professional boxing record ==
48 fights	28 wins	14 losses
By knockout	13	0
By decision	15	14
Draws	6	

No.	Result	Record	Opponent	Type	Round, time	Date	Location	Notes
48	Loss	28–14–6	Suk Chul Bae	UD	10 (10)	1982-07-11	Munhwa Gymnasium, Seoul, South Korea	
47	Win	28–13–6	Kiyoshi Nagashima	KO	9 (10)	1981-12-06	Gwangju Gymnasium, Gwangju City, South Korea	
46	Loss	27–13–6	Hong Soo Yang	PTS	10 (10)	1981-06-27	Gudeok Gymnasium, Busan, South Korea	
45	Loss	27–12–6	Hector Meléndez	PTS	10 (10)	1981-05-13	Santo Domingo, Dominican Republic	
44	Loss	27–11–6	Rafael Orono	PTS	10 (10)	1981-04-06	Caracas, Venezuela	
43	Loss	27–10–6	Miguel Canto	PTS	10 (10)	1981-02-22	Merida, Mexico	
42	Win	27–9–6	Bemi Dayodan	KO	1 (10)	1981-01-11	Daegu, South Korea	
41	Win	26–9–6	Arnel Arrozal	UD	10 (10)	1980-09-26	Munhwa Gymnasium, Seoul, South Korea	
40	Loss	25–9–6	Shoji Oguma	SD	15 (15)	1980-07-28	Kuramae Kokugikan, Tokyo, Japan	For WBC flyweight title
39	Draw	25–8–6	Hong Soo Yang	TD	6 (10)	1980-06-20	Munhwa Gymnasium, Seoul, South Korea	
38	Loss	25–8–5	Lee Seung-hoon	PTS	10 (10)	1980-05-09	Munhwa Gymnasium, Seoul, South Korea	
37	Loss	25–7–5	Shigeo Nakajima	UD	15 (15)	1980-01-03	Korakuen Hall, Tokyo, Japan	Lost WBC light-flyweight title
36	Win	25–6–5	Hector Meléndez	UD	15 (15)	1979-10-21	Munhwa Gymnasium, Seoul, South Korea	Retained WBC light-flyweight title
35	Win	24–6–5	Siony Carupo	SD	15 (15)	1979-07-28	Jangchung Gymnasium, Seoul, South Korea	Retained WBC light-flyweight title
34	Win	23–6–5	Jiro Takada	PTS	10 (10)	1979-06-03	Jangchung Gymnasium, Seoul, South Korea	
33	Draw	22–6–5	Hector Meléndez	SD	15 (15)	1979-03-31	Munhwa Gymnasium, Seoul, South Korea	Retained WBC light-flyweight title
32	Win	22–6–4	Peter Siscon	KO	4 (10)	1979-02-24	Munhwa Gymnasium, Seoul, South Korea	
31	Win	21–6–4	Ric Barimbad	PTS	10 (10)	1978-11-30	Munhwa Gymnasium, Seoul, South Korea	
30	Win	20–6–4	Netrnoi Sor Vorasingh	KO	3 (15)	1978-09-30	Munhwa Gymnasium, Seoul, South Korea	Won WBC light-flyweight title
29	Loss	19–6–4	Sang Il Jung	PTS	12 (12)	1978-07-09	Munhwa Gymnasium, Seoul, South Korea	Lost OPBF light-flyweight title
28	Win	19–5–4	Eddie Carazal	KO	10 (10)	1978-06-15	Munhwa Gymnasium, Seoul, South Korea	
27	Draw	18–5–4	Franco Torregoza	PTS	10 (10)	1978-05-06	Gudeok Gymnasium, Busan, South Korea	
26	Win	18–5–3	Kazunori Tenryu	KO	3 (12)	1978-03-25	Munhwa Gymnasium, Seoul, South Korea	Retained OPBF light-flyweight title
25	Win	17–5–3	Sang Il Jung	PTS	12 (12)	1978-01-29	Munhwa Gymnasium, Seoul, South Korea	Won OPBF light-flyweight title
24	Win	16–5–3	Kyung Ju Ha	KO	5 (10)	1977-12-28	Munhwa Gymnasium, Seoul, South Korea	
23	Win	15–5–3	Demetrio Alferez	KO	7 (10)	1977-11-04	Munhwa Gymnasium, Seoul, South Korea	
22	Win	14–5–3	Ryuji Iwamoto	PTS	10 (10)	1977-08-10	Gudeok Gymnasium, Busan, South Korea	
21	Draw	13–5–3	Yong Hyun Kim	PTS	10 (10)	1977-07-15	Munhwa Gymnasium, Seoul, South Korea	Retained South Korean light-flyweight title
20	Loss	13–5–2	Kazunori Tenryu	PTS	10 (10)	1977-04-19	Japan	
19	Win	13–4–2	Mak Dong Kim	PTS	10 (10)	1977-03-27	Daegu Gymnasium, Daegu, South Korea	Retained South Korean light-flyweight title
18	Loss	12–4–2	Shoji Oguma	PTS	10 (10)	1977-02-15	Korakuen Hall, Tokyo, Japan	
17	Win	12–3–2	Little Park	PTS	10 (10)	1977-01-22	Munhwa Gymnasium, Seoul, South Korea	Won vacant South Korean light-flyweight title
16	Win	11–3–2	Suriya Patumwadee	KO	5 (10)	1976-11-27	Cheongju Gymnasium, Cheongju, South Korea	
15	Win	10–3–2	Ki Hyung Lee	TKO	4 (10)	1976-09-01	Jangchung Gymnasium, Seoul, South Korea	
14	Draw	9–3–2	Young Hwan Kim	PTS	8 (8)	1976-06-24	Jangchung Gymnasium, Seoul, South Korea	
13	Win	9–3–1	Little Park	PTS	10 (10)	1976-01-25	Gudeok Gymnasium, Busan, South Korea	Retained South Korean light-flyweight title
12	Win	8–3–1	Ki Hyung Lee	PTS	10 (10)	1975-11-23	Gudeok Gymnasium, Busan, South Korea	Retained South Korean light-flyweight title
11	Win	7–3–1	Myung An Moon	PTS	10 (10)	1975-08-31	Gudeok Gymnasium, Busan, South Korea	Won inaugural South Korean light-flyweight title
10	Win	6–3–1	Han Soo Lee	KO	3 (8)	1975-07-23	Gudeok Gymnasium, Busan, South Korea	
9	Loss	5–3–1	Little Park	PTS	10 (10)	1975-06-07	Jangchung Gymnasium, Seoul, South Korea	
8	Win	5–2–1	Chun Woo Lee	PTS	8 (8)	1975-04-19	Gudeok Gymnasium, Busan, South Korea	
7	Win	4–2–1	Yong Keun Lee	KO	2 (8)	1975-03-30	Daegu Gymnasium, Daegu, South Korea	
6	Win	3–2–1	Yung Woon Lee	PTS	4 (4)	1974-12-28	Jangchung Gymnasium, Seoul, South Korea	
5	Win	2–2–1	Shi Ho Kim	KO	5 (6)	1974-09-04	Daegu Gymnasium, Daegu, South Korea	
4	Loss	1–2–1	Hak Soo Suh	PTS	4 (4)	1974-06-07	Gudeok Gymnasium, Busan, South Korea	
3	Win	1–1–1	Yung Woon Lee	PTS	4 (4)	1974-06-06	Gudeok Gymnasium, Busan, South Korea	
2	Draw	0–1–1	In Soo Lim	PTS	4 (4)	1972-02-05	Jangchung Gymnasium, Seoul, South Korea	
1	Loss	0–1	In Soo Lim	PTS	4 (4)	1971-12-28	Jangchung Gymnasium, Seoul, South Korea	

== Later life & death ==
After retiring, Kim experienced dementia pugilistica and financial difficulties, and on February 3, 1989, he committed suicide by leaping off a building in Seoul, South Korea.

== See also ==
- List of Korean boxers
- List of world light-flyweight boxing champions

Sporting positions
Regional boxing titles
Inaugural champion	South Korean light-flyweight champion August 31, 1975 – 1976; Vacated	Vacant Title next held by Sang Il Jung
Vacant Title last held by Sang Il Jung	South Korean light-flyweight champion January 22, 1977 – 1977; Vacated	Vacant Title next held by Yong Hyun Kim
Preceded by Sang Il Jung	OPBF light-flyweight champion January 29, 1978 – July 9, 1978	Succeeded by Sang Il Jung
World boxing titles
Preceded by Netrnoi Sor Vorasingh	WBC light-flyweight champion September 30, 1978 – January 3, 1980	Succeeded by Shigeo Nakajima
