= Tadashi Tomori =

Japanese boxer (born 1959)

Tadashi Tomori 友利 正
Personal information
- Nationality: Japanese
- Born: 28 December 1959 (age 66) Naha, Okinawa, USCAR (nowadays Japan)
- Height: 5 ft 3 in (160 cm)
- Weight: Light flyweight

Boxing career
- Stance: Orthodox

Boxing record
- Total fights: 26
- Wins: 19
- Win by KO: 5
- Losses: 7

Tadashi Tomori (友利 正, Tomori Tadashi; born December 28, 1959) is a retired Japanese boxer who is a former WBC junior flyweight champion.

== Amateur career ==
Tomori won the Japan's inter-high school championship in the 45 kg class in 1977, and compiled an amateur record of 16–4 (3 KOs) before turning professional. Hitoshi Misako who is the president of Misako Boxing Gym in Tokyo went to Okinawa, and encouraged Tomori to turn professional. After joining that gym in 1978, he made his professional debut at the Korakuen Hall in May of that year.

== Professional career ==
In March 1979, Tomori won the annual Japanese boxing series, All-Japan Rookie King Tournament in the junior flyweight division. Although he lost on points to Kazunori Tenryū in the Japanese junior flyweight title bout in November 1979, he knocked out the sixteen-time defending champion Tenryū in the first round of the return match in February 1980 to capture the title. However he lost on points to Shūichi Hozumi in his second defense in August of that year. He competed with Masaharu Inami for the vacated title, but it also ended in a failure.

Originally Tomori was an out-fighter who excelled in the speed and skill. During his professional career, he had almost mastered the in-fighting to be spotlighted. However his transformation into an in-fighter was still incomplete. So, his manager Misako made him go to the temple for the sitting meditation practice in order to discipline his mind. Tomori regained the vacant Japanese title via a close decision in October 1981, and defended it once via a unanimous decision in his first professional fight in his hometown of Naha. At that time, Misako sensed that Tomori got a boost of energy, and set a world title shot for him.

On April 13, 1982, Tomori was scheduled to fight against Amado Ursúa for the WBC junior flyweight title at the Korakuen Hall. He trained under the guidance of Eddie Townsend who signed a deal with Misako Boxing Gym in March of that year. After the champion's pre-fight open workout, Koichi Wajima, Tomori's senior in the same gym, commented that he wondered if Tomori could sustain himself for three rounds. Nevertheless, he built a lead over Ursúa until the middle of the fight throwing his sharp right crosses and left jabs. In the later rounds Ursúa fought back fiercely, but was dethroned via a split decision. Ursúa expressed dissatisfaction to the decision.

His first defense against Hilario Zapata was initially scheduled in Panama City on June 5, 1982. However it was postponed to July 20 and moved to the Ishikawa Sangyō Hall in Kanazawa, Ishikawa due to Tomori's rib injury. In that first defense, Tomori lost to Zapata via a split decision. Misako protested the decision of the judges to the WBC, and Tomori had a rematch with Zapata as a challenger at the Kuramae Kokugikan on November 30 of the same year. However Tomori who had believed his own victory in the previous fight, told that he would not be able to fight more than he did on July 20. He suffered a cut above his left eye from the sixth round, and was stopped in the eighth round after being floored in the seventh and eighth rounds. Some time after that fight, Tomori retired.

== Professional boxing record ==
26 fights	19 wins	7 losses
By knockout	5	1
By decision	14	6

No.	Result	Record	Opponent	Type	Round, time	Date	Location	Notes
26	Loss	19–7	Hilario Zapata	TKO	8 (15)	1982-11-30	Kokugikan, Tokyo, Japan	For WBC light flyweight title
25	Loss	19–6	Hilario Zapata	SD	15 (15)	1982-07-20	Sangyo Hall, Kanazawa, Japan	Lost WBC light flyweight title
24	Win	19–5	Amado Ursua	MD	15 (15)	1982-04-13	Korakuen Hall, Tokyo, Japan	Won WBC light flyweight title
23	Win	18–5	Yoshiaki Kanda	UD	10 (10)	1982-02-26	Onoyama Gym, Naha, Japan	Retained Japanese light flyweight title
22	Win	17–5	Hiroyuki Tada	PTS	10 (10)	1981-10-12	Korakuen Hall, Tokyo, Japan	Won vacant Japanese light flyweight title
21	Loss	16–5	Yong Hyun Kim	UD	10 (10)	1981-08-23	Kudok Gymnasium, Busan, South Korea	
20	Win	16–4	Ryuji Ichinomiya	KO	4 (10)	1981-04-30	Korakuen Hall, Tokyo, Japan	
19	Loss	15–4	Masaharu Inami	UD	10 (10)	1980-11-27	Korakuen Hall, Tokyo, Japan	For vacant Japanese light flyweight title
18	Loss	15–3	Shuichi Hozumi	MD	10 (10)	1980-08-29	Korakuen Hall, Tokyo, Japan	Lost Japanese light flyweight title
17	Win	15–2	Kazuyoshi Funaki	UD	10 (10)	1980-05-30	Korakuen Hall, Tokyo, Japan	Retained Japanese light flyweight title
16	Win	14–2	Puma Koya	PTS	10 (10)	1980-04-20	Korakuen Hall, Tokyo, Japan	
15	Win	13–2	Kazunori Tenryu	KO	1 (10)	1980-02-28	Korakuen Hall, Tokyo, Japan	Won Japanese light flyweight title
14	Win	12–2	Keisuke Yuguchi	KO	2 (10)	1979-12-24	Korakuen Hall, Tokyo, Japan	
13	Loss	11–2	Kazunori Tenryu	UD	10 (10)	1979-11-19	Korakuen Hall, Tokyo, Japan	For Japanese light flyweight title
12	Win	11–1	Phoenix Taniguchi	KO	7 (10)	1979-09-27	Korakuen Hall, Tokyo, Japan	
11	Win	10–1	Hammer Yoshida	PTS	8 (8)	1979-07-15	Korakuen Pingpong Center, Tokyo, Japan	
10	Loss	9–1	Puma Koya	MD	8 (8)	1979-05-24	Korakuen Hall, Tokyo, Japan	
9	Win	9–0	Jung Il Han	PTS	6 (6)	1979-04-20	Munhwa Gymnasium, Seoul, South Korea	
8	Win	8–0	Tsuguhiro Miyaoka	PTS	6 (6)	1979-03-03	Korakuen Hall, Tokyo, Japan	
7	Win	7–0	Toshikazu Higa	PTS	6 (6)	1978-12-18	Korakuen Hall, Tokyo, Japan	
6	Win	6–0	Kiyomi Sato	PTS	4 (4)	1978-11-13	Korakuen Hall, Tokyo, Japan	
5	Win	5–0	Yasufumi Ogawa	PTS	4 (4)	1978-09-28	Korakuen Hall, Tokyo, Japan	
4	Win	4–0	Kiyomi Sato	PTS	4 (4)	1978-08-25	Miyagi Sports Center, Sendai, Japan	
3	Win	3–0	Koichi Togashi	KO	1 (4)	1978-07-27	Korakuen Hall, Tokyo, Japan	
2	Win	2–0	Kiyomi Sato	PTS	4 (4)	1978-06-22	Korakuen Hall, Tokyo, Japan	
1	Win	1–0	Kanemi Takahashi	PTS	4 (4)	1978-05-25	Korakuen Hall, Tokyo, Japan	

== See also ==
- Boxing in Japan
- List of Japanese boxing world champions
- List of world light-flyweight boxing champions

== Bibliography ==
- Boxing Magazine editorial department, ed. (May 31, 2002). 日本プロボクシング史 世界タイトルマッチで見る50年 (Japan Pro Boxing History – 50 Years of World Title Bouts) (in Japanese). Tokyo, Japan: Baseball Magazine Sha Co., Ltd. pp. 55–57, 297. ISBN 978-4-583-03695-3.
- Naoki Fukuda; et al. (January 15, 2000). "友利正〜インファイトに世界への活路を見出す〜". In Boxing Magazine editorial department (ed.). The Glorious Moments 究極の栄光・世界チャンピオン名鑑 – 日本ボクシング史に輝く41人の男たち. B.B.mook; 117, sports series; No.72 (in Japanese). Tokyo, Japan: Baseball Magazine Sha Co., Ltd. pp. 62–63, 107. ISBN 978-4-583-61076-4.

Sporting positions
Regional boxing titles
Preceded by Kazunori Tenryu	Japanese light flyweight champion February 28, 1980 – August 29, 1980	Succeeded by Shuichi Hozumi
Vacant Title last held by Masaharu Inami	Japanese light flyweight champion October 12, 1981 – 1982; Vacated	Vacant Title next held by Katsumi Satō
World boxing titles
Preceded by Amado Ursua	WBC light flyweight champion April 13, 1982 – July 20, 1982	Succeeded by Hilario Zapata
