= Huinca Renancó =

- City
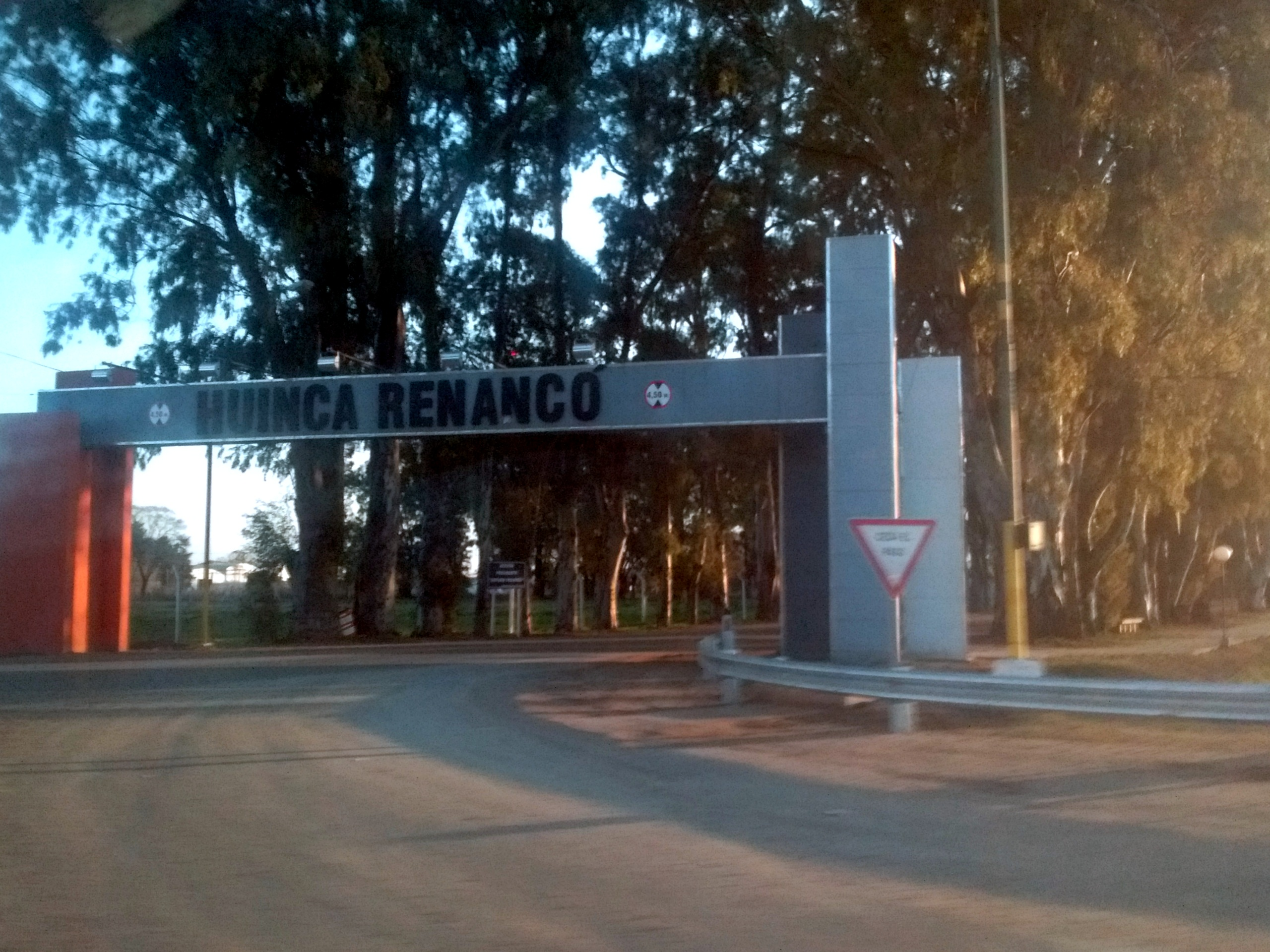
- Main entrance

- Location in Argentina
- Coordinates: 34°50′24″S 64°22′31″W
- Country: Argentina
- Province: Córdoba
- Department: General Roca

Government
  - Intendant: Ana Lucía Bolaño (UCR)
- Elevation: 183 m (600 ft)

Population (2010)
  - Total: 9,426
- Time zone: UTC−3 (ART)
- CPA base: X6270
- Dialing code: +54 02336

Huinca Renancó is a city in the province of Córdoba, Argentina.

Huinca Renanco is almost equidistant between Rio Cuarto, to the city's north, and Santa Rosa, to the city's south, via Argentina Highway 35.

== Famous Residents ==
- Santos Laciar
- Germán Sopeña
