= Ramon Nery =

Dominican Republic Flyweight boxer

Ramon Neri
Personal information
- Nickname: "Sordito"
- Nationality: Dominican
- Born: Ramon Antonio Nery; August 10, 1961 (age 64) Santiago de los Caballeros, Dominican Republic
- Weight: Flyweight

Boxing career

Boxing record
- Total fights: 24
- Wins: 19
- Win by KO: 18
- Losses: 5
- Draws: 0
- No contests: 0

Ramon Antonio Nery (born August 10, 1961, in Santiago de los Caballeros, Dominican Republic) is a Dominican former professional boxer, who was once ranked in the top ten in the world among Flyweight boxers by the World Boxing Association, and who once fought for the WBA's world Flyweight championship. At a regional level, Nery was the Dominican Republic's national Flyweight champion. Nery was born with deafness, and his boxing nickname was "sordito", which means "(little) deaf (person)" in Spanish. Nery's condition meant he had to have special lights installed on the ring's corners when he fought; that way he could tell when a round began or finished.

== Professional boxing career ==
Nery had no amateur boxing contests. He debuted as a professional on June 17, 1980, beating Felix Diaz (0–3 before their bout) at Santo Domingo, by first-round knockout. Nery build a record of 8–0, with all 8 wins by knockout (including a rematch win over Diaz, another first-round knockout on Nery's 19th birthday, on August 10, 1980) before winning by decision for the first (and only) time in his career, when the 4 wins, 4 losses Elpidio de Paula lasted ten rounds with Nery on March 27, 1981, in Santo Domingo.

Nery's next bout resulted in a huge step-up in opposition class: he faced Puerto Rican Orlando Maldonado. Maldonado had been a bronze medalist at the 1976 Summer Olympics in Montreal, Canada, and sported a 21 wins, 2 losses and 2 draws (ties) record in 25 previous fights, having boxed, among others, International Boxing Hall of Fame member and former world Flyweight champion Miguel Canto. Nery and Maldonado met on May 2, 1981, at Santo Domingo and Nery prevailed by an eighth-round knockout. That win began another knockout win streak for Nery, which this time reached nine knockouts in a row. These included two wins over future WBA world Junior Flyweight champion Francisco Quiroz, whose two losses to Nery came inside a week's span; first on March 1, 1982, for the Dominican Republic's national Flyweight championship (a fight which Nery won in the third round) and then, six days later when Nery stopped him in round four of their rematch, both fights taking place in Santo Domingo. Quiroz had 6 wins and 3 losses before Nery's two contests with him.

By then, Nery had built a fan-base not only in the Dominican Republic but also in Puerto Rico-in Puerto Rico's case, not only because of the Dominican diaspora already living there during the early 1980s, but also because Nery had fans of Puerto Rican descendance as well. In Puerto Rico, Nery's contests were covered by such media outlets as El Vocero and El Nuevo Dia newspapers.

Nery was 18–0, with 17 wins by knockout, when the WBA gave him a chance at their world Flyweight championship. On March 4, 1983, Nery had his first contest to be held abroad, when he challenged Santos Laciar at the Estadio Chateau Carreras in Cordoba, Argentina. In a war, Nery and Laciar kept throwing hard, solid punches at each other until Laciar wore the challenger down and retained the championship with a brutal, ninth-round knockout.

=== Rest of career ===
Nery awaited one year to return to a professional boxing ring, after which, on March 9, 1984, he faced the 4 wins, 6 losses Ernesto Sanchez at Santo Domingo. In what turned out to be Nery's last win as a professional boxer, he defeated Sanchez by a fourth-round knockout.

He then traveled to Panama, where, on July 14, 1984, he faced the former two-time World Boxing Council world Junior Flyweight and future WBA world Flyweight champion and International Boxing Hall of Fame member, 23 wins, 4 losses Hilario Zapata, at the Gimnasio Nuevo Panama (now Roberto Duran Arena) in Ciudad Panama. Nery dropped Zapata in round seven, but he lost by a relatively close but unanimous ten-rounds decision, with scores of 93–98, 94–97 and 96–97, all in favor of the Panamanian.

On February 2, 1985, Nery made his debut in front of his fans in Puerto Rico, when he faced the undefeated, 13 wins and one draw, future World Boxing Organization world Super Flyweight championship challenger, Puerto Rican Rafael "Baby" Caban, as part of the Victor Callejas-Seung Hoon Lee WBA world Super Bantamweight championship fight's program held at the Roberto Clemente Coliseum in San Juan. Nery lost by a ten-rounds unanimous decision.

Next, Nery made his United States professional boxing debut when faced, on May 10, 1985, with the future WBC world Bantamweight champion Miguel "Happy" Lora of Colombia, in a ten-rounds meeting held at the Tamiami Fairgrounds Auditorium in Miami, Florida. He lost to Lora by a second-round knockout.

In his last professional boxing fight, Nery fought Johnny Carter, a boxer who had previously challenged Jeff Chandler for the future International Boxing Hall of Fame member's WBA world Bantamweight championship during 1982. Nery-Carter was fought on March 18, 1986, at the Sands Casino Hotel in Atlantic City, New Jersey, United States. Carter won the bout by a fifth-round technical knockout, the contest being stopped at 2 minutes and 48 seconds of that round.

== Career in review ==
A hard-hitting, one time world title challenger, Nery retired from professional boxing with a record of 19 wins and 5 losses in 24 bouts, with 18 wins and 3 losses by way of knockout.

== See also ==
- List of Dominicans
- Mario D'Agata – another deaf professional boxer
