= Hilario Zapata =

Panamanian boxer

Personal information
- Nickname: Bujía ("Spark Plug")
- Born: August 19, 1958 (age 68) Panama City, Panama
- Height: 5 ft 6 in (168 cm)
- Weight: Light flyweight; Flyweight; Super flyweight

Boxing career
- Reach: 68 in (173 cm)
- Stance: Southpaw

Boxing record
- Total fights: 54
- Wins: 43
- Win by KO: 14
- Losses: 10
- Draws: 1

Hilario Zapata (born August 19, 1958) is a Panamanian former professional boxer who competed from 1977 to 1993. He is a world champion in two weight classes, having held the World Boxing Council (WBC) light flyweight title twice between 1980 and 1983, and the World Boxing Association (WBA) flyweight title from 1985 to 1987.

== Professional career ==
Zapata began his professional boxing career in 1977, beating Victor Lopez by a knockout in the second round. He had 2 wins in '77.

He had a fast ascent to the top, starting in 1978. By his fifth bout, on July 1, he was meeting former WBA light flyweight champion Juan Guzmán in Panama City, beating Guzman by a decision in ten. His next fight, against Yong-Hwang Kim, in South Korea, was his first fight abroad; Beating Kim by a 10-round decision on August 19. Then, he met former WBA flyweight champion Alfonso Lopez, for the vacant Latin American light flyweight belt. Zapata suffered his first loss in the fight against Lopez, when he was beaten in a 12 round decision.

He started 1979 with a fight against Ramon Perez in Puerto Rico, winning by a knockout in nine. He had three more wins in 1979, including one over two division champion Freddie Castillo, and by the end of that year he was ranked number one in the world among light flyweight challengers by the WBC.

Zapata went to Japan, winning against Shigeo Nakajima to become the WBC light flyweight champion, having defended his title 8 times.

In 1981, he and future light flyweight champion Joey Olivo fought what was the only light flyweight title bout ever broadcast on American national TV live until Michael Carbajal came along nine years later. Zapata beat Olivo by a knockout in round 13 to retain his belt, and then, defended against Rudy Crawford in a 15-round decision. He also defended his titles against German Torres and former light flyweight champion Netrnoi Sor Vorasingh.

On February 6, 1982, he lost the world title by knockout against Amado Panterita Ursua. On July 20, Zapata regained the WBC light flyweight title by beating Tomori on a 15-round decision. Then, he beat future world champion Jung-Koo Chang by a decision in 15. He closed out the year with a rematch against Tomori in Tokyo, knocking Tomori out in 8 rounds.

On March 26, 1983, Zapata and Chang met again in South Korea, and this time, Chang became world champion by knocking Zapata out in the third round. On November 9, on the Marvin Hagler vs. Roberto Durán's undercard's week, Zapata was beaten by a knockout in 10 by Harold Petty.

His career seemingly over, he quickly recovered from those back to back losses and began winning again, but this time as a flyweight. By the end of 1984, he was ranked number one by the WBA among flyweights, and on December 8 of that year, he challenged world Flyweight champion Santos Laciar. Zapata lost a 15-round decision. In 1986, after Laciar had vacated the crown, he beat Alonzo Gonzalez to win the WBA flyweight title. He defended his title 5 times, before losing it to Fidel Bassa.

In 1993, he challenged for a world title once again, but was knocked out in the first round by the WBC super flyweight champion Sung-Kil Moon.

It can also be added that Zapata's first pair of boxing gloves, when he was 12, came as a present from Duran himself.

He was inducted to the International Boxing Hall Of Fame in June 2016.

Zapata had a record of 43 wins and 10 losses, with 1 draw, and 14 wins by knockout.

== Professional boxing record ==
54 fights	43 wins	10 losses
By knockout	14	4
By decision	29	6
Draws	1	

No.	Result	Record	Opponent	Type	Round, time	Date	Location	Notes
54	Loss	43–10–1	Moon Sung-kil	TKO	1 (12), 2:54	Feb 27, 1993	Olympic Fencing Gymnasium, Seoul, South Korea	For WBC super flyweight title
53	Win	43–9–1	Noel Cogollo	UD	12	Nov 28, 1992	Gimnasio Nuevo Panama, Panama City, Panama	Won WBC FECARBOX super flyweight title
52	Win	42–9–1	Eduardo Lopez	UD	10	Oct 31, 1992	Arena Panama Al Brown, Colon City, Panama	
51	Loss	41–9–1	David Merchant	TD	7 (12)	Sep 19, 1992	Gimnasio Nuevo Panama, Panama City, Panama	For WBA Fedelatin super flyweight title
50	Win	41–8–1	Guillermo Salcedo	TKO	7 (10)	Aug 15, 1992	Gimnasio Nuevo Panama, Panama City, Panama	
49	Win	40–8–1	Juan Rios	UD	10	Aug 1, 1992	Gimnasio Nuevo Panama, Panama City, Panama	
48	Win	39–8–1	Emilio Diaz	KO	2 (10), 2:02	Feb 21, 1991	Hotel El Panama, Panama City, Panama	
47	Win	38–8–1	Genaro Manjarres	UD	10	Oct 26, 1990	Hotel El Panama, Panama City, Panama	
46	Win	37–8–1	Orlando Legal	KO	6 (10), 0:25	Sep 13, 1990	Estudios de TV 2, Panama City, Panama	
45	Win	36–8–1	Agustin Garcia	UD	10	Aug 30, 1990	Estudios de TV 2, Panama City, Panama	
44	Loss	35–8–1	Pedro Romero	SD	10	Apr 22, 1989	Arena Panama Al Brown, Colon City, Panama	
43	Loss	35–7–1	Julio Gudino	UD	10	Dec 3, 1988	Gimnasio Neco de la Guardia, Panama City, Panama	
42	Draw	35–6–1	Fidel Bassa	SD	15	Aug 15, 1987	Gimnasio Nuevo Panama, Panama City, Panama	For WBA flyweight title
41	Loss	35–6	Fidel Bassa	UD	15	Feb 13, 1987	Estadio de Tenis del Country Club, Barranquilla, Colombia	Lost WBA flyweight title
40	Win	35–5	Claudemir Carvalho Dias	UD	15	Dec 7, 1986	Hotel Quatro Rodas, Salvador, Brazil	Retained WBA flyweight title
39	Win	34–5	Alberto Castro	SD	15	Sep 13, 1986	Gimnasio Nuevo Panama, Panama City, Panama	Retained WBA flyweight title
38	Win	33–5	Dodie Boy Peñalosa	UD	15	Jul 5, 1986	University of Life Training & Recreational Arena, Pasig City, Philippines	Retained WBA flyweight title
37	Win	32–5	Shuichi Hozumi	UD	15	Apr 7, 1986	Municipal Gymnasium, Nirasaki, Japan	Retained WBA flyweight title
36	Win	31–5	Javier Lucas	UD	15	Jan 31, 1986	Gimnasio Nuevo Panama, Panama City, Panama	Retained WBA flyweight title
35	Win	30–5	Alonzo Gonzalez	UD	15	Oct 5, 1985	Gimnasio Nuevo Panama, Panama City, Panama	Won vacant WBA flyweight title
34	Win	29–5	Alonzo Gonzalez	PTS	10	Mar 29, 1985	Gimnasio Nuevo Panama, Panama City, Panama	
33	Win	28–5	Ramon E. Espinal	TKO	1 (10), 1:22	Feb 2, 1985	Gimnasio Nuevo Panama, Panama City, Panama	
32	Win	27–5	Rafael Cabrera	UD	10	Dec 28, 1984	Gimnasio Neco de la Guardia, Panama City, Panama	
31	Loss	26–5	Santos Laciar	UD	15	Dec 8, 1984	Estadio Luna Park, Buenos Aires, Argentina	For WBA flyweight title
30	Win	26–4	Alberto Castro	PTS	10	Oct 10, 1984	Porlamar, Venezuela	
29	Win	25–4	Alex Miranda	TKO	9 (10)	Sep 1, 1984	Gimnasio Nuevo Panama, Panama City, Panama	
28	Win	24–4	Ramon Nery	UD	10	Jul 14, 1984	Gimnasio Nuevo Panama, Panama City, Panama	
27	Win	23–4	Juan Polo Pérez	UD	10	Jun 23, 1984	Centro de Convenciones Atlapa, Panama City, Panama	
26	Loss	22–4	Harold Petty	TKO	10 (12), 2:38	Nov 9, 1983	Showboat Hotel and Casino Sports Pavilion, Las Vegas, Nevada, U.S.	For NABF bantamweight title
25	Loss	22–3	Chang Jung-koo	TKO	3 (15), 2:46	Mar 26, 1983	Chungmu Gymnasium, Daejeon, Japan	Lost WBC light flyweight title
24	Win	22–2	Tadashi Tomori	TKO	8 (15), 1:59	Nov 30, 1982	Kokugikan, Japan	Retained WBC light flyweight title
23	Win	21–2	Chang Jung-koo	SD	15	Sep 18, 1982	Jeonju Gymnasium, Jeonju, South Korea	Retained WBC light flyweight title
22	Win	20–2	Tadashi Tomori	SD	15	Jul 20, 1982	Sangyo Hall, Kanazawa, Japan	Won WBC light flyweight title
21	Loss	19–2	Amado Ursua	KO	2 (15), 2:47	Feb 6, 1982	Gimnasio Nuevo Panama, Panama City, Panama	Lost WBC light flyweight title
20	Win	19–1	Netrnoi Sor Vorasingh	TKO	10 (15), 2:50	Nov 5, 1981	Suranaree Stadium, Nakhon Ratchasima, Thailand	Retained WBC light flyweight title
19	Win	18–1	Germán Torres	UD	15	Aug 15, 1981	Gimnasio Nuevo Panama, Panama City, Panama	Retained WBC light flyweight title
18	Win	17–1	Rudy Crawford	UD	15	Apr 24, 1981	Cow Palace, Daly City, California, U.S.	Retained WBC light flyweight title
17	Win	16–1	Joey Olivo	RTD	13 (15)	Feb 8, 1981	Gimnasio Nuevo Panama, Panama City, Panama	Retained WBC light flyweight title
16	Win	15–1	Reinaldo Jose Becerra	MD	15	Dec 1, 1980	Nuevo Circo, Caracas, Venezuela	Retained WBC light flyweight title
15	Win	14–1	Shigeo Nakajima	TKO	11 (15), 2:56	Sep 17, 1980	Civic Center, Gifu, Japan	Retained WBC light flyweight title
14	Win	13–1	Hector Melendez	UD	15	Aug 4, 1980	Caracas, Venezuela	Retained WBC light flyweight title
13	Win	12–1	Chi Bok Kim	UD	15	Jun 7, 1980	Munhwa Gymnasium, Seoul, South Korea	Retained WBC light flyweight title
12	Win	11–1	Shigeo Nakajima	UD	15	Mar 24, 1980	Kokugikan, Japan	Won WBC light flyweight title
11	Win	10–1	Jose Ricard	TKO	7 (10), 1:00	Oct 6, 1979	Arena Panama Al Brown, Colon City, Panama	
10	Win	9–1	Freddy Castillo	UD	12	Jun 23, 1979	Gimnasio Nuevo Panama, Panama City, Panama	
9	Win	8–1	Nestor Obregon	UD	10	Apr 7, 1979	Gimnasio Nuevo Panama, Panama City, Panama	
8	Win	7–1	Ramon L. Perez	TKO	9 (10)	Jan 14, 1979	Hiram Bithorn Stadium, San Juan, Panama	
7	Loss	6–1	Alfonso López	SD	12	Nov 1, 1978	Gimnasio Nuevo Panama, Panama City, Panama	
6	Win	6–0	Young Hwan Kim	PTS	10	Aug 19, 1978	Jangchung Gymnasium, Seoul, South Korea	
5	Win	5–0	Juan Guzman	UD	10	Jul 2, 1978	Gimnasio Nuevo Panama, Panama City, Panama	
4	Win	4–0	Alfredo Thomas	TKO	3 (8)	Apr 15, 1978	Gimnasio Nuevo Panama, Panama City, Panama	
3	Win	3–0	Humberto Mayorga	PTS	6	Mar 4, 1978	Gimnasio Nuevo Panama, Panama City, Panama	
2	Win	2–0	Cesar Becerra	TKO	3 (4), 2:05	Nov 26, 1977	Gimnasio Nuevo Panama, Panama City, Panama	
1	Win	1–0	Victor Lopez	TKO	2 (4), 1:25	Oct 28, 1977	Arena de Colon, Colon City, Panama	

== Titles in boxing ==
=== Major world titles ===
- WBC light flyweight champion (108 lbs) (2x)
- WBA flyweight champion (112 lbs)

=== Regional/International titles ===
- WBC FECARBOX super flyweight champion (115 lbs)

== See also ==
- List of southpaw stance boxers
- List of world light-flyweight boxing champions
- List of world flyweight boxing champions

Sporting positions
World boxing titles
Preceded by Shigeo Nakajima	WBC light flyweight champion March 24, 1980 – February 6, 1982	Succeeded by Amado Ursua
Preceded by Tadashi Tomori	WBC light flyweight champion July 20, 1982 – March 26, 1983	Succeeded by Chang Jung-koo
Vacant Title last held by Santos Laciar	WBA flyweight champion October 5, 1985 – February 13, 1987	Succeeded by Fidel Bassa
