= Netrnoi Sor Vorasingh =

Thai boxer

Personal information
- Nationality: Thai
- Born: Net Ladnork; April 22, 1959 Bua Yai District, Thailand
- Died: December 3, 1982 (aged 23) Phang Khon District, Thailand
- Height: 149.8 cm (4 ft 11 in)
- Weight: Light flyweight; Flyweight

Boxing career
- Stance: Southpaw

Boxing record
- Total fights: 38
- Wins: 29
- Win by KO: 15
- Losses: 7
- Draws: 2
- No contests: 0

Netrnoi Sor Vorasingh (Thai: เนตรน้อย ส.วรสิงห์; April 22, 1959, in Bua Yai District, Nakhon Ratchasima Province – December 3, 1982 in Phang Khon District, Sakon Nakhon Province) was a Thai world boxing champion.

== Biography & career ==
Sor Vorasingh was born as Netr Ladnork (เนตร ลาดนอก) in poor family in Bua Yai District, Nakhon Ratchasima Province, but raised in Phang Khon District, Sakon Nakhon Province.

Sor Vorasingh turned professional in 1975 at the age of fifteen, after being unsuccessful in Muay Thai style. He had challenged championship three times, the first time with the OPBF light flyweight champion Sang-il Chun of South Korea in 1976, the result was a draw. The second time with the WBC light flyweight title holder Luis Estaba at Estaba home, Caracas, Venezuela in 1977. He was defeated via scores over 15 rounds.

For the third time in 1978, he succeeded when he won the WBC light flyweight title with a decision win over Venezuela's Freddy Castillo at Thai Army Sports Stadium, Bangkok. On September 30, 1978, Sung-Jun Kim of South Korea knocked out the 4’10” southpaw Sor Vorasingh in three rounds, making him, at nineteen years and 5 months old, the youngest fighter to ever lose a world title.

In 1981, Sor Vorasingh challenged the WBC light flyweight title holder Hilario Zapata from Panama at Suranari Military Camp, 2nd Army Area, Nakhon Ratchasima Province, but lost to a technical knockout in 10th round.

Behind the scenes of his fight with Zapata, Sor Vorasingh's camp sought supernatural assistance by consulting a shaman in Pak Thong Chai. The shaman provided guidance on the exact moments Sor Vorasingh should leave his dressing room and step into the ring, timed precisely to coincide with the release of a Khwai Thanu, a traditional Thai occult charm meant to sap the opponent's strength.

The shaman insisted that Sor Vorasingh must enter the ring after Zapata. However, due to an unexpected delay on Zapata's part, the organizers had Sor Vorasingh enter first, breaking the ritual's intended order. In a later interview, Sor Vorasingh claimed that during the bout, his arms and legs were overwhelmed by a mysterious fatigue he couldn't explain.

His final boxing match was against Samart Payakaroon, a top Muay Thai fighter making his professional boxing debut in 1982 at Lumpinee Stadium. Although Sor Vorasingh lost after ten rounds, the decision was met with boos and discontent from the crowd, as many believed he had done enough to win.

== Death ==
Sor Vorasingh died on December 3, 1982, in a motorcycle accident in his hometown Phang Khon District, just 4 months after the fight with Payakaroon. He had a record of 29 wins and 7 losses, with 15 wins by knockout.

== See also ==
- List of light-flyweight boxing champions

Achievements
| Preceded by Freddy Castillo | WBC light flyweight champion May 6, 1978 – September 30, 1978 | Succeeded by Kim Sung-jun |
Status
| Preceded by Salvador Sánchez | Latest born world champion to die December 3, 1982 – June 3, 1988 | Succeeded by Davey Moore |
