= Amado Ursua =

Mexican boxer (born 1956)

Personal information
- Nickname: Panterita
- Born: Amado Ursua; 13 September 1956 (age 69) Mexico City, Mexico
- Height: 1.65 m (5 ft 5 in)
- Weight: Bantamweight; Flyweight; Minimumweight

Boxing career
- Reach: 180 cm (71 in)
- Stance: Orthodox

Boxing record
- Total fights: 55
- Wins: 34
- Win by KO: 25
- Losses: 21

Amado Ursua (born 13 September 1956) is a Mexican former professional boxer and WBC light flyweight champion.

== Professional career ==
Amado won the Mexican National Light Flyweight title by upsetting veteran German Torres in a twelfth-round unanimous decision.

=== WBC Light Flyweight Championship ===
On February 6, 1982, in Panama City, Ursua won his WBC Light Flyweight title by upsetting a one loss Hilario Zapata by K.O. in the second round. Many had thought Amado did not have a chance against the Panamanian.

He would go on to lose his WBC title in a very controversial fifteen round Majority decision to Tadashi Tomori in Tokyo.

== See also ==
- List of Mexican boxing world champions
- List of WBC world champions
- List of light flyweight boxing champions

Preceded by Hilario Zapata	WBC Light Flyweight Champion; 6 February 1982– 13 April 1982	Succeeded by Tadashi Tomori
