= Lee Seung-hoon =

Lee Seung-hoon (Korean: 이승훈) may also refer to:

- Lee Seung-hoon (speed skater) (born 1988), South Korean speed skater.
- Yi Seung-hun (1756–1801), Korean Catholic martyr
- Lee Seung-hun (born 1938), South Korean cyclist
- Lee Seung-hoon (boxer) (born 1960), South Korean boxer
- Lee Seung-hoon (rapper) (born 1992), South Korean rapper under YG Entertainment, also known by the mononym Hoony
- Lee Seung-hoon (tennis) (born 1979), South Korean tennis player
