= Hector Acero Sánchez =

Dominican boxer (born 1966)

Personal information
- Nationality: Dominican
- Born: March 18, 1966 (age 60) Santiago de los Caballeros, Dominican Republic
- Height: 5 ft 7 in (170 cm)
- Weight: Super bantamweight

Boxing career
- Reach: 70 in (178 cm)
- Stance: Orthodox

Boxing record
- Total fights: 53
- Wins: 41
- Win by KO: 22
- Losses: 9
- Draws: 3

Hector Acero Sánchez (born March 18, 1966) is a Dominican former professional boxer who competed from 1989 to 2002. He held the WBC super bantamweight title from 1994 to 1995.

== Boxing career ==
In August 1994, he defeated Tracy Harris Patterson via split decision in a surprise upset for the WBC super bantamweight title. After winning a non-title bout against Barrington Francis in 1994, Sánchez made two defenses of his title the following year, defeating former WBA super bantamweight champion Julio Gervacio in a 12 round unanimous decision and fighting to a controversial draw against former WBC bantamweight and two-time WBC super bantamweight champion, Daniel Zaragoza. They fought again on November 6, 1995, when the WBC ordered an immediate rematch for the title. The fight was close and bloody as Zaragaza was prone to cuts throughout his career, but after 12 rounds, Sánchez lost his title via split decision.

== Professional boxing record ==
53 fights	41 wins	9 losses
By knockout	22	1
By decision	19	8
Draws	3	

No.	Result	Record	Opponent	Type	Round	Date	Location	Notes
53	Loss	41–9–3	Rocky Juarez	UD	10	Oct 19, 2002	Reliant Park, Houston, Texas, U.S.	
52	Loss	41–8–3	Juan Carlos Ramirez	UD	10	Aug 2, 2002	Ector County Coliseum, Odessa, Texas, U.S.	
51	Win	41–7–3	Victorio Abadia	UD	12	Jan 31, 2002	Days Inn, Allentown, Pennsylvania, U.S.	Retained WBC Latino featherweight title
50	Win	40–7–3	Baby Lorona Jr.	UD	12	Aug 11, 2001	Miccosukee Resort & Gaming, Miami, Florida, U.S.	Won WBC Latino featherweight title
49	Win	39–7–3	Catalino Becerra	TKO	6 (10)	Jun 16, 2000	Gimnasio Nuevo Panama, Panama City, Panama	
48	Win	38–7–3	Aldo Valtierra	TD	6 (10)	Apr 17, 2000	Casino Queen, East St. Louis, Illinois, U.S.	
47	Loss	37–7–3	Nana Yaw Konadu	PTS	10	Jun 12, 1999	Shriners Auditorium, Wilmington, Massachusetts, U.S.	
46	Loss	37–6–3	Carlos Barreto	UD	12	Oct 3, 1998	Caracas, Venezuela	For WBA interim super bantamweight title
45	Win	37–5–3	Juan Jesus Mejia	UD	8	Aug 5, 1998	Capitol Theatre, Rye, New York, U.S.	
44	Win	36–5–3	Darryl Pickney	UD	10	Feb 21, 1998	Miccosukee Resort & Gaming, Miami, Florida, U.S.	
43	Win	35–5–3	Mauricio Martínez	UD	8	Nov 28, 1997	The Blue Horizon, Philadelphia, Pennsylvania, U.S.	
42	Win	34–5–3	Mauricio Martínez	UD	8	Aug 23, 1997	Madison Square Garden, New York City, New York, U.S.	
41	Loss	33–5–3	Kennedy McKinney	UD	12	May 6, 1997	Medieval Times, Lyndhurst, New Jersey, U.S.	For IBF-USBA super bantamweight title
40	Loss	33–4–3	Érik Morales	UD	12	Jun 7, 1996	Caesars Palace, Paradise, Nevada, U.S.	For WBC-NABF super bantamweight title
39	Win	33–3–3	Rafael Rodriguez	TKO	5 (?)	Mar 23, 1996	Paramount Theater, New York City, New York, U.S.	
38	Loss	32–3–3	Daniel Zaragoza	SD	12	Nov 6, 1995	Great Western Forum, Inglewood, California, U.S.	Lost WBC super bantamweight title
37	Draw	32–2–3	Daniel Zaragoza	MD	12	Jun 2, 1995	Foxwoods Resort Casino, Ledyard, Connecticut, U.S.	Retained WBC super bantamweight title
36	Win	32–2–2	Julio Gervacio	UD	12	Mar 11, 1995	Bally's, Atlantic City, New Jersey, U.S.	Retained WBC super bantamweight title
35	Win	31–2–2	Barrington Francis	UD	10	Oct 28, 1994	Fernwood Resort, Bushkill, Pennsylvania, U.S.	
34	Win	30–2–2	Tracy Harris Patterson	SD	12	Aug 26, 1994	Bally's, Atlantic City, New Jersey, U.S.	Won WBC super bantamweight title
33	Win	29–2–2	Jose Hernandez	UD	8	May 13, 1994	Hotel Pennsylvania, New York City, New York, U.S.	
32	Loss	28–2–2	Frankie Toledo	UD	10	Mar 31, 1994	Bally's, Atlantic City, New Jersey, U.S.	
31	Draw	28–1–2	Eddie Croft	PTS	10	Dec 9, 1993	Paramount Theatre, New York City, New York, U.S.	
30	Win	28–1–1	Ishmael Sanders	SD	10	Oct 1, 1993	Ramada Hotel, New York City, New York, U.S.	Retained USA New York State super bantamweight title
29	Win	27–1–1	Darryl Pinckney	UD	10	Mar 20, 1993	Ramada Hotel, New York City, New York, U.S.	Won vacant USA New York State super bantamweight title
28	Draw	26–1–1	Victor Laureano	TD	2 (?)	Sep 4, 1992	Carolina, Puerto Rico	
27	Win	26–1	Luis Ramos	KO	3 (?)	Jul 16, 1992	Santo Domingo, Dominican Republic	
26	Win	25–1	Cesar Almonte	KO	2 (?)	Apr 5, 1992	Santiago de los Caballeros, Dominican Republic	
25	Win	24–1	Domingo Solano	PTS	10	Nov 13, 1991	Santo Domingo, Dominican Republic	
24	Loss	23–1	Jose Garcia	KO	11 (12)	Sep 5, 1991	Santo Domingo, Dominican Republic	For Dominican Republic super bantamweight title
23	Win	23–0	Fenel Solano	KO	2 (?)	May 26, 1991	Puerto Plata, Dominican Republic	
22	Win	22–0	Areil Cordoba	TKO	4 (?)	Mar 21, 1991	Santo Domingo, Dominican Republic	
21	Win	21–0	Frank Rodriguez	TKO	3 (?)	Jan 21, 1991	Santo Domingo, Dominican Republic	
20	Win	20–0	Jose Antonio Pena	TKO	5 (?)	Dec 10, 1990	Santo Domingo, Dominican Republic	
19	Win	19–0	Ricardo Pascual	PTS	10	Nov 11, 1990	Santiago de los Caballeros, Dominican Republic	
18	Win	18–0	Radamez Rodriguez	TKO	2 (?)	Oct 19, 1990	Santo Domingo, Dominican Republic	
17	Win	17–0	Cesar Almonte	TKO	8 (?)	Aug 20, 1990	Santo Domingo, Dominican Republic	
16	Win	16–0	Francisco Pena	TKO	7 (?)	Jul 1, 1990	Santo Domingo, Dominican Republic	
15	Win	15–0	Domingo Alvarez	TKO	6 (12)	May 5, 1990	Santiago de los Caballeros, Dominican Republic	Won Dominican Republic super bantamweight title
14	Win	14–0	Cesar Almonte	TKO	7 (?)	Apr 26, 1990	Santo Domingo, Dominican Republic	
13	Win	13–0	Ricardo Pascual	PTS	10	Mar 30, 1990	Santo Domingo, Dominican Republic	
12	Win	12–0	Mario Gomez	TKO	4 (?)	Mar 1, 1990	Santo Domingo, Dominican Republic	
11	Win	11–0	Luis Baoking	PTS	8	Nov 28, 1989	Santiago de los Caballeros, Dominican Republic	
10	Win	10–0	Luis Antonio Guzman	TKO	6 (?)	Oct 11, 1989	Santiago de los Caballeros, Dominican Republic	
9	Win	9–0	Luis Antonio Guzman	PTS	8	Sep 22, 1989	Palacio de los Deportes, Santiago de los Caballeros, Dominican Republic	
8	Win	8–0	Johnny Cabrera	TKO	1 (?)	Sep 6, 1989	Santo Domingo, Dominican Republic	
7	Win	7–0	Nelson Solano	TKO	3 (?)	Aug 16, 1989	Santiago de los Caballeros, Dominican Republic	
6	Win	6–0	Julian Gonzalez	PTS	6	Jul 27, 1989	Santo Domingo, Dominican Republic	
5	Win	5–0	Nelson Solano	KO	1 (?)	Jul 17, 1989	Santiago de los Caballeros, Dominican Republic	
4	Win	4–0	Julio Castro	TKO	2 (?)	Jul 1, 1989	La Romana, Dominican Republic	
3	Win	3–0	Luis Perez	TKO	5 (?)	Jun 6, 1989	Santiago de los Caballeros, Dominican Republic	
2	Win	2–0	Manuel Ramirez	TKO	2 (?)	Apr 10, 1989	Santiago de los Caballeros, Dominican Republic	
1	Win	1–0	Fernando Zayas	KO	4 (?)	Mar 10, 1989	La Romana, Dominican Republic	

== See also ==
- List of Super Bantamweight boxing champions
- List of WBC world champions

Achievements
Preceded by Tracy Harris Patterson	WBC Super Bantamweight Champion; Aug 26, 1994– Nov 06, 1995	Succeeded by Daniel Zaragoza
