= Dave McAuley =

Northern Irish boxer

Dave McAuley MBE
Personal information
- Nickname: Dave 'Boy' McAuley
- Born: David Anthony McAuley; 15 June 1961 (age 65) Larne, County Antrim, Northern Ireland
- Weight: Flyweight

Boxing career
- Stance: Orthodox

Boxing record
- Total fights: 23
- Wins: 18
- Win by KO: 8
- Losses: 3
- Draws: 2

David Anthony McAuley (born 15 June 1961, Larne, United Kingdom) is a former professional boxer from Northern Ireland who competed from 1983 to 1992. He held the IBF flyweight world title from 1989 to 1992 and challenged twice for the WBA flyweight world title in 1987 and 1988. At regional level, he held the British flyweight title in 1986.

== Boxing career ==
McAuley fought under the name Dave "Boy" McAuley and was one of the last Irish boxers to fight for a world title over 15 rounds. His lost two world title bouts to Fidel Bassa of Colombia in 1987 and 1988. On 7 June 1989, McAuley defeated Duke McKenzie for the IBF world title at Wembley Arena, London.

He successfully defended his title five times, eventually losing it on 11 June 1992 at the Sports Pavilion in Bilbao, Spain to Rodolfo Blanco. He had defeated Blanco two years previously.

McAuley was unusually tall for a flyweight, standing at 5'7".

He also had a short-lived MMA career in 1993, fighting twice under the K1 rules, winning one bout and drawing his final contest.

== Professional boxing record ==
23 fights	18 wins	3 losses
By knockout	8	1
By decision	10	2
Draws	2	

No.	Result	Record	Opponent	Type	Round, time	Date	Location	Notes
23	Loss	18–3–2	Rodolfo Blanco	UD	12	11 Jun 1992	Sports Pavilion, Bilbao, Spain	Lost IBF flyweight title
22	Win	18–2–2	Jacob Matlala	KO	10 (12)	7 Sep 1991	Leisure Centre, Belfast, Northern Ireland	Retained IBF flyweight title
21	Win	17–2–2	Pedro José Feliciano	UD	12	11 May 1991	Leisure Centre, Belfast, Northern Ireland	Retained IBF flyweight title
20	Win	16–2–2	Rodolfo Blanco	UD	12	15 Sep 1990	King's Hall, Belfast, Northern Ireland	Retained IBF flyweight title
19	Win	15–2–2	Louis Curtis	UD	12	17 Mar 1990	King's Hall, Belfast, Northern Ireland	Retained IBF flyweight title
18	Win	14–2–2	Dodie Boy Peñalosa	SD	12	8 Nov 1989	Grand Hall, London, England	Retained IBF flyweight title
17	Win	13–2–2	Duke McKenzie	UD	12	7 Jun 1989	The Arena, London, England	Won IBF flyweight title
16	Loss	12–2–2	Fidel Bassa	UD	12	26 Mar 1988	King's Hall, Belfast, Northern Ireland	For WBA flyweight title
15	Win	12–1–2	Roy Thompson	PTS	10	7 Dec 1987	Ulster Hall, Belfast, Northern Ireland	
14	Loss	11–1–2	Fidel Bassa	TKO	13 (15)	25 Apr 1987	King's Hall, Belfast, Northern Ireland	For WBA flyweight title
13	Win	11–0–2	Joe Kelly	TKO	9 (12)	20 Oct 1986	St. Andrews SC, Albany Hotel, Glasgow, Scotland	Won vacant British flyweight title
12	Win	10–0–2	Charlie Brown	TKO	1 (8)	22 Apr 1986	Ulster Hall, Belfast, Northern Ireland	
11	Win	9–0–2	Kelvin Smart	DQ	6 (8)	15 Feb 1986	RDS Arena, Dublin, Ireland	Smart disqualified for intentional low blows
10	Win	8–0–2	Bobby McDermott	TKO	10 (10)	8 Jun 1985	Loftus Road, London, England	
9	Win	7–0–2	Johnny Mack	TKO	1 (8)	3 Feb 1985	King's Hall, Belfast, Northern Ireland	
8	Win	6–0–2	Graham Clarke	TKO	4 (6)	19 Dec 1984	Ulster Hall, Belfast, Northern Ireland	
7	Win	5–0–2	Dave George	TKO	6 (8)	13 Nov 1984	Ulster Hall, Belfast, Northern Ireland	
6	Win	4–0–2	John Mwaimu	PTS	6	13 Oct 1984	King's Hall, Belfast, Northern Ireland	
5	Win	3–0–2	Roy Williams	PTS	6	17 Sep 1984	Corn Exchange, Brighton, England	
4	Draw	2–0–2	Kenny Walsh	PTS	6	27 Feb 1984	Albany Hotel, Birmingham, England	
3	Win	2–0–1	Ian Colbeck	PTS	6	25 Jan 1984	King's Hall, Belfast, Northern Ireland	
2	Win	1–0–1	Dave Smith	KO	1 (6)	16 Nov 1983	King's Hall, Belfast, Northern Ireland	
1	Draw	0–0–1	John Mwaimu	PTS	6	5 Oct 1983	Ulster Hall, Belfast, Northern Ireland	

== See also ==
- List of Irish sportspeople

Preceded by Duke McKenzie	IBF Flyweight Champion; 7 June 1989 – 11 June 1992	Succeeded by Rodolfo Blanco
