= Fabrice Benichou =

French boxer

Personal information
- Nationality: French
- Born: 5 April 1965 (age 61) Madrid, Spain
- Height: 5 ft 3 in (1.60 m)
- Weight: Bantamweight; Super Bantamweight; Featherweight

Boxing career
- Stance: Orthodox

Boxing record
- Total fights: 66
- Wins: 46
- Win by KO: 24
- Losses: 18
- Draws: 2

Fabrice Benichou (born 5 April 1965) is a Spanish-born French former professional boxer. In 1987 Benichou was rated as the #4 bantamweight in the world. He became World Champion of boxing in 1989. He is three times super bantamweight World Champion, and two times European bantamweight and featherweight champion.

== Biography ==
Benichou was born on 5 April 1965 in Madrid, Spain. He is French of Spanish-Algerian Jewish heritage.

== Amateur career ==
He reached the finals of the French National Bantamweight championship in 1984. He flew all over the world to train boxing in different countries, until take a long time training in Cuba.

== Pro boxing career ==
On 30 January 1988 he won the vacant European Bantamweight title against Thierry Jacob in a ninth-round knockout in Calais, France.

Benichou won the IBF Super Bantamweight championship on 10 March 1989 against Jose Sanabria in a twelve-round split decision. He lost his title a year later to Welcome Ncita in a bout that took place in Tel Aviv.

He contended unsuccessfully for the IBF Featherweight title on 12 September 1992 in a close 12-round split decision against Manuel Medina in France.

He resumed his boxing career briefly in late 2005.

== Professional boxing record ==
66 fights	46 wins	18 losses
By knockout	24	7
By decision	22	11
Draws	2	

No.	Result	Record	Opponent	Type	Round, time	Date	Location	Notes
66	Loss	46–18–2	Jorge Samudio	TKO	4 (10), 3:00	30 Sep 2006	Gimnasio Escolar, David, Panama	For WBC Latino featherweight title
65	Win	46–17–2	Eduardo Julio	TKO	4 (6), 0:19	3 Dec 2005	Gimnasio Auditorio, Las Tablas, Panama	
64	Loss	45–17–2	Spencer Oliver	TKO	4 (12), 2:16	31 Jan 1998	Lee Valley Leisure Centre, London, England	For European super-bantamweight title
63	Win	45–16–2	Martin Krastev	TKO	8	29 Nov 1997	Berck, Hauts-de-France, France	
62	Win	44–16–2	Valentin Dumitru	TKO	7 (8)	11 Oct 1997	Aubagne, Provence-Alpes-Côte d'Azur, France	
61	Win	43–16–2	Demir Nanev	TKO	6 (8)	19 Apr 1997	Aubagne, Provence-Alpes-Côte d'Azur, France	
60	Win	42–16–2	Luis Moreno	PTS	8	29 Mar 1997	Grande-Synthe, Hauts-de-France, France	
59	Win	41–16–2	Esteban Pérez Quiñones	PTS	8	15 Mar 1997	Metz, Grand Est, France	
58	Win	40–16–2	Juan Estupiñán	PTS	8	30 Nov 1996	Hussigny-Godbrange, Grand Est, France	
57	Win	39–16–2	Peter Buckley	PTS	8	28 Sep 1996	Broadway Theatre, London, England	
56	Win	38–16–2	Antoine Garcia	TKO	5	23 Mar 1996	Grande-Synthe, Hauts-de-France, France	
55	Draw	37–16–2	Mehdi Labdouni	PTS	10	17 Feb 1996	Berck, Hauts-de-France, France	
54	Loss	37–16–1	Arlindo de Abreu	SD	10	29 Apr 1995	Grande-Synthe, Hauts-de-France, France	For vacant French featherweight title
53	Draw	37–15–1	Billy Hardy	MD	10	4 Mar 1995	Saint-Quentin, Hauts-de-France	
52	Win	37–15	Arlindo de Abreu	MD	10	28 Jan 1995	Allauch, Provence-Alpes-Côte d'Azur, France	
51	Loss	36–15	Wayne McCullough	PTS	10	12 Nov 1994	The Point, Dublin, Ireland	
50	Win	36–14	Lee Cargle	PTS	8	30 Sep 1994	Combs-la-Ville, Île-de-France	
49	Win	35–14	Esteban Pérez Quiñones	UD	8	18 Mar 1994	Salle de la Bulle, Beausoleil, France	
48	Loss	34–14	Stéphane Haccoun	PTS	10	3 Jun 1993	Palais des Sports, Marseille, France	
47	Win	34–13	Roy Muniz	KO	2	15 Apr 1993	Tourcoing, Hauts-de-France, France	
46	Loss	33–13	Maurizio Stecca	SD	12	18 Dec 1992	Zénith d'Auvergne, Clermont-Ferrand, France	Lost European featherweight title
45	Loss	33–12	Paul Hodkinson	TKO	10 (12), 1:35	12 Sep 1992	Patinoire de Toulouse, Blagnac, France	For WBC featherweight title
44	Win	33–11	John Davidson	MD	12	29 May 1992	Amnéville, Grand Est, France	Retained European featherweight title
43	Loss	32–11	Manuel Medina	SD	12	14 Mar 1994	Espace Piscino, Antibes, France	For IBF featherweight title
42	Win	32–10	Vincenzo Limatola	TKO	10 (12)	15 Nov 1991	Arènes de Nîmes, Nîmes, Frabce	Retained European featherweight title
41	Win	31–10	Salvatore Bottiglieri	TKO	8 (12)	9 Aug 1991	La Pinede, Juan-les-Pins, France	Retained European featherweight title
40	Win	30–10	John Davidson	UD	12	25 May 1991	Brest, Brittany, France	Won vacant European featherweight title
39	Win	29–10	Jorge Alberto Pompe	PTS	8	1 Apr 1991	Stade Louis II, Fontvieille, Monaco	
38	Win	28–10	Darryl Jones	KO	1 (8), 0:42	16 Feb 1991	Deauville, Normandy, France	
37	Win	27–10	Ben Baez	TKO	7	2 Feb 1991	Les Ponts-de-Cé, Pays de la Loire, France	
36	Loss	26–10	Luis Mendoza	UD	12	18 Oct 1990	Palais omnisports de Paris-Bercy, Paris, France	For WBA super-bantamweight title
35	Win	26–9	Amos Cowart	KO	2	27 Aug 1990	Palais des Congres d'Acropolis, Nice, France	
34	Loss	25–9	Welcome Ncita	UD	12	10 Mar 1990	Hilton Hotel, Tel Aviv, Israel	Lost IBF super-bantamweight title
33	Win	25–8	Ramón Cruz	UD	12	7 Oct 1989	Bordeaux, Nouvelle-Aquitaine, France	Retained IBF super-bantamweight title
32	Win	24–8	Fransie Badenhorst	TKO	5 (12), 0:40	10 Jun 1989	Palazzo dello Sport, Frosinone, Italy	Retained IBF super-bantamweight title
31	Win	23–8	José Sanabria	SD	12	10 Mar 1989	Palais des Sports de Beaublanc, Limoges, France	Won IBF super-bantamweight title
30	Win	22–8	José Gallegos	PTS	8	20 Jan 1989	Limoges, Nouvelle-Aquitaine, France	
29	Win	21–8	Isidoro Medina	KO	2 (8)	9 Dec 1988	Rodez, Occitania, France	
28	Win	20–8	Miguel Pequeño	PTS	8	21 Nov 1988	Forges-les-Eaux, Normandy, France	
27	Loss	19–8	Raymond Armand	PTS	8	7 Nov 1988	Le Palace, Paris, France	
26	Loss	19–7	José Sanabria	TKO	10 (12), 2:50	26 Jun 1988	Pavillon Baltard, Nogent-sur-Marne, France	For IBF super-bantamweight title
25	Win	19–6	Alberto Contreras	TKO	3	24 Jun 1988	Caesars Palace, Paradise, Nevada, U.S.	
24	Win	18–6	Efren Chavez	UD	8	6 Jun 1988	Las Vegas Hilton, Paradise, Nevada, U.S.	
23	Loss	17–6	Vincenzo Belcastro	KO	3 (12)	13 Apr 1988	Busalla, Liguria, Italy	Lost European bantamweight title
22	Win	17–5	Thierry Jacob	KO	9 (12)	30 Jan 1988	Calais, Hauts-de-France, France	Won vacant European bantamweight title
21	Win	16–5	Sonny Long	PTS	8	21 Nov 1987	Salle Pierre de Coubertin, Paris, France	
20	Win	15–5	Vicente Fernández	RTD	1	5 Oct 1987	Paris, Île-de-France, France	
19	Loss	14–5	Haidar Nourredine	TKO	3	6 Jul 1987	Differdange, Esch-sur-Alzette, Luxembourg	
18	Win	14–4	Shane Silvester	TKO	3 (8)	23 Jun 1987	Paris, Île-de-France, France	
17	Win	13–4	James Tolliver	KO	1	27 Apr 1987	Paris, Île-de-France, France	
16	Win	12–4	Jean-Paul Guillard	TKO	3	14 Mar 1987	Paris, Île-de-France, France	
15	Loss	11–4	Moussa Sangare	TKO	6	13 Feb 1987	Villeurbanne, Auvergne-Rhône-Alpes, France	
14	Win	11–3	Rocky Lawlor	TKO	1 (8)	6 Feb 1987	Salle Sallusse Santoni, Antibes, France	
13	Win	10–3	Kelvin Smart	TKO	1 (8)	31 Jan 1987	Le Zénith Sud, Montpellier, France	
12	Win	9–3	Jose Otero	PTS	8	28 Nov 1986	Toulon, Provence-Alpes-Côte d'Azur, France	
11	Win	8–3	Juan Ramon Muriel	PTS	8	3 Nov 1986	Paris, Île-de-France, France	
10	Loss	7–3	Fernando Beltrán	PTS	8	15 Sep 1986	Paris, Île-de-France, France	
9	Win	7–2	Jalleleine Mastouri	PTS	6	4 Jul 1986	Porlezza, Lombardy, Italy	
8	Win	6–2	Abdoulac Diane	TKO	4	9 May 1986	Sassari, Sardinia, Italy	
7	Win	5–2	Jesse Williams	TKO	7 (8), 2:05	8 Feb 1986	Convention Center, Miami Beach, Florida, U.S.	
6	Win	4–2	Humberto Moreno	TKO	3 (4), 1:13	16 Nov 1985	Gimnasio Nuevo Panamá, Panama City, Panama	
5	Win	3–2	Gerardo Rodríguez	SD	4	19 Jul 1985	Arena Panama Al Brown, Colón, Panama	
4	Loss	2–2	Ernesto Ford	UD	6	15 Jun 1985	Gimnasio Neco de la Guardia, Panama City, Panama	
3	Loss	2–1	José Chacón	PTS	6	5 Oct 1984	Barinas, Barinas, Venezuela	
2	Win	2–0	Corrado Infanti	PTS	6	7 Aug 1984	Follonica, Tuscany, Italy	
1	Win	1–0	Claudio Tanda	PTS	6	19 Jul 1984	Pistoia, Tuscany, Italy	

== Acting career ==
A versatile actor, he is best known for the 1996 film Mo, the 2007's TV mini-series Lance of Longinus, the 2008 TV series Doom Doom, the 2009 film Mensch and the 2012 film, The World Belongs to Us.

== See also ==
- List of select Jewish boxers

Achievements
Regional boxing titles
Vacant Title last held by Louis Gomis	European Bantamweight Champion; 30 January – 13 April 1988	Succeeded by Vincenzo Belcastro
World boxing titles
Preceded by Jose Sanabria	IBF Super Bantamweight Champion; 10 March 1989 – 10 March 1990	Succeeded by Welcome Ncita
