= Pichit Sitbangprachan =

Thai boxer

- Born: Supap Hanwichachai (สุภาพ หาญวิชาชัย); January 15, 1966 (age 60); Amphoe Chatturat (now Amphoe Noen Sa-nga), Chaiyaphum province, Thailand
- Native name: พิชิต ศิษย์บางพระจันทร์
- Other names: Ai-mud phi sing (ไอ้หมัดผีสิง) "The Haunted Fist"
- Nationality: Thai
- Height: 161 cm (5 ft 3 in)
- Weight: Flyweight
- Stance: Southpaw
- Team: Onesongchai Promotion, Thailand
- Trainer: Sukjai Sappalek; Ismael Salas; Siangnow Sitbangprachan (Muay Thai)
- Years active: 1988–1994, 1996–2000

Professional boxing record
- Total: 24
- Wins: 24
- By knockout: 18

Other information
- Notable relatives: Pichit Chor Siriwat (younger brother)
- Boxing record from BoxRec

Pichit Sitbangprachan (Thai: พิชิต ศิษย์บางพระจันทร์); born Supap Hanwichachai (สุภาพ หาญวิชาชัย); 15 January 1966) is a former professional boxer and Muay Thai fighter from Thailand. He is one of just fifteen world boxing champions to retire without a loss. He is the older brother of Pichit Chor Siriwat, a former WBA Junior-flyweight champion.

== Career history ==
Pichit started his fighting career in Muay Thai where he competed until the age of 22. Training alongside his younger brother Pichitnoi Sitbangprachan. Sitbangprachan turned to professional boxing in 1988. In 1992, he captured the IBF flyweight title with a knockout victory over reigning champion Rodolfo Blanco at Imperial World Samrong in Samut Prakan. The win brought him widespread fame in Thailand, as the country had no active world boxing champions at the time.

He successfully defended the belt five times, including a notable win over Arthur Johnson, who had been trained by Angelo Dundee, at the Surat Thani Provincial Stadium in southern Thailand, and a split-decision victory against Jose Luis Zepeda in May 1994 in Ratchaburi.

Following the bout, Zepeda disputed the result and filed a request with the IBF for a rematch. The IBF granted the request, but the fight never materialized, as Sitbangprachan announced his retirement later that year, on November 25, during a press conference held at the Parliament House.

=== Comeback ===
Sitbangprachan returned to boxing in 1996 and fought and won one bout. He then returned in 2000 and fought and won two bouts before retiring for good. He retired undefeated at 24–0, with 18 knockouts, and is one of a select group of boxing world champions who were never defeated in their professional career.

=== Retirement ===
After retirement he traveled to Osaka, Japan, where he became a boxing trainer at the Ioka Boxing Gym.

At present, he works as a Muay Thai trainer in Thailand.

== Professional boxing record ==
24 fights	24 wins	0 losses
By knockout	18	0
By decision	6	0

No.	Result	Record	Opponent	Type	Round, time	Date	Location	Notes
24	Win	24–0	Oscar Vargas	KO	5 (?)	May 12, 2000	Mukdahan, Thailand	
23	Win	23–0	Marlon Arlos	PTS	10	Apr 2, 2000	Bangkok, Thailand	
22	Win	22–0	Sammy Sordilla	TKO	8 (10)	Oct 27, 1996	Laplae, Thailand	
21	Win	21–0	Jose Luis Zepeda	SD	12	May 8, 1994	Ratchaburi, Thailand	Retained IBF flyweight title
20	Win	20–0	Arthur Johnson	UD	12	Jan 23, 1994	Provincial Stadium, Surat Thani, Thailand	Retained IBF flyweight title
19	Win	19–0	Miguel Martinez	TKO	9 (12), 1:54	Oct 3, 1993	Provincial Stadium, Chaiyaphum, Thailand	Retained IBF flyweight title
18	Win	18–0	Ladislao Vazquez	TKO	5 (?)	Aug 8, 1993	Bangkok, Thailand	
17	Win	17–0	Kyung-Yung Lee	TKO	1 (12), 1:02	Jul 11, 1993	Provincial Stadium, Nakhon Sawan, Thailand	Retained IBF flyweight title
16	Win	16–0	Antonio Perez	TKO	4 (12), 2:50	Mar 6, 1993	Outdoor Stadium, Uttaradit, Thailand	Retained IBF flyweight title
15	Win	15–0	Dan Nietes	UD	10	Jan 24, 1993	Bangkok, Thailand	
14	Win	14–0	Rodolfo Blanco	KO	3 (12), 2:02	Nov 29, 1992	Imperial World Center, Samut Prakan, Thailand	Won IBF flyweight title
13	Win	13–0	Tarman Garzim	PTS	10	Oct 3, 1992	Bangkok, Thailand	
12	Win	12–0	Hak Myung Kim	TKO	2 (?)	Jul 5, 1992	Bangkok, Thailand	
11	Win	11–0	Ronnie Magramo	TKO	8 (?)	May 29, 1992	Bangkok, Thailand	
10	Win	10–0	Mario Sajulan	TKO	6 (?)	Mar 20, 1992	Bangkok, Thailand	
9	Win	9–0	Jae Suk Ahn	KO	3 (?)	Dec 27, 1991	Bangkok, Thailand	
8	Win	8–0	Sugar Ray Hynes	KO	3 (?)	Nov 5, 1991	Bangkok, Thailand	
7	Win	7–0	Sammy Tyson Pagadan	KO	3 (?)	Aug 30, 1991	Bangkok, Thailand	
6	Win	6–0	Ippo Gala	PTS	10	Jul 2, 1991	Lumpinee Boxing Stadium, Bangkok, Thailand	
5	Win	5–0	Myung Ho Kim	KO	2 (?)	Jun 14, 1991	Bangkok, Thailand	
4	Win	4–0	Hidayat	KO	3 (?)	Feb 15, 1991	Central Stadium, Ayutthaya, Thailand	
3	Win	3–0	Salaman Alamus	KO	4 (10)	Jan 4, 1991	Bangkok, Thailand	
2	Win	2–0	Hee Hwan Moon	KO	3 (?)	Nov 10, 1990	Lumpinee Boxing Stadium, Bangkok, Thailand	
1	Win	1–0	Taksin Muangsurin	KO	2 (?)	Mar 25, 1988	Lumpinee Boxing Stadium, Bangkok, Thailand	

== Muay Thai record ==
Muay Thai Record
Date	Result	Opponent	Event	Location	Method	Round	Time
1990-09-	Win	(Thailand) Rerkchai Singkongpan	Lumpinee Stadium	Bangkok, Thailand	KO	1	
1990-09-	Win	(Thailand) Pairot Wor.Wolapon	Lumpinee Stadium	Bangkok, Thailand	KO	3	
1990-08-18	Win	(Thailand) Dawden Sor.Sakkasem	Lumpinee Stadium	Bangkok, Thailand	KO (Punches)	1	
1990-07-	Win	(Thailand) Kahewa Chor.Rachachat	Lumpinee Stadium	Bangkok, Thailand	KO	2	
1990-05-21	Loss	(Thailand) Pairot Wor.Wolapon	Lumpinee Stadium	Bangkok, Thailand	Decision	5	3:00
1990-01-05	Loss	(Thailand) Makhamlek Sit Khunwaen	Lumpinee Stadium	Bangkok, Thailand	Decision	5	3:00
1989-09-19	Loss	(Thailand) Thanongchai Charoenmuang	Lumpinee Stadium	Bangkok, Thailand	Decision	5	3:00
1989-07-25	Loss	(Thailand) Paruhatnoi Sitchunthong	Lumpinee Stadium	Bangkok, Thailand	Decision	5	3:00
1989-06-13	Win	(Thailand) Chuchod Lukprabat	Lumpinee Stadium	Bangkok, Thailand	TKO	1	
1989-03-28	Loss	(Thailand) Kuekrit Sor.Nayaiam	Lumpinee Stadium	Bangkok, Thailand	Decision	5	3:00
1988-12-	Win	(Thailand) Songchainoi Por.Somjit Air	Omnoi Stadium	Samut Sakhon, Thailand	TKO	2	
1988-12-02	Win	(Thailand) Samranthong Chuchokchai	Lumpinee Stadium	Bangkok, Thailand	KO	2	
1988-11-03	Loss	(Thailand) Makhamlek Sit Khunwaen	Rajadamnern Stadium	Bangkok, Thailand	Decision	5	3:00
1988-05-03	Loss	(Thailand) Pongsiri Por Ruamrudee	Lumpinee Stadium	Bangkok, Thailand	Decision	5	3:00
1988-01-28	Win	(Thailand) Petchnamkhang Chatphol191	Rajadamnern Stadium	Bangkok, Thailand	KO (Punch)	2	
1987-12-25	Win	(Thailand) Petchdam Sitsei	Rajadamnern Stadium	Bangkok, Thailand	KO (Punch)	1	
1987-10-13	Win	(Thailand) Phannarai Pongyok		Bangkok, Thailand	KO		
1987-09-30	Win	(Thailand) Noppakun Sor.Samreangyok		Nakhon Ratchasima, Thailand	KO	4	
1987-09-25	Win	(Thailand) Sadsai Sitsamthan	Rangsit Stadium	Thailand	KO	2	
1987-08-04	Loss	(Thailand) Keukkong Fairtex	Lumpinee Stadium	Bangkok, Thailand	Decision	5	3:00
1987-06-26	Win	(Thailand) Keukkong Fairtex	Lumpinee Stadium	Bangkok, Thailand	Decision	5	3:00
1987-04-14	Win	(Thailand) Detked Fairtex	Lumpinee Stadium	Bangkok, Thailand	Decision	5	3:00
1987-02-20	Win	(Thailand) Detked Fairtex	Lumpinee Stadium	Bangkok, Thailand	KO		
1987-01-30	Win	(Thailand) Noompluk Muanglopburi	Rangsit Stadium	Thailand	KO		
Legend: Win Loss Draw/No contest Notes

Preceded by Rodolfo Blanco	IBF Flyweight Champion; 1992 Nov 29 – 1994 Nov 24; Retired	Succeeded by Francisco Tejedor
