= Peter Harris (boxer) =

Welsh boxer

Personal information
- Nationality: Welsh
- Born: Peter G. Harris; 23 August 1962 (age 64) Swansea, Wales
- Weight: Featherweight

Boxing career
- Stance: Orthodox

Boxing record
- Total fights: 33
- Wins: 16
- Win by KO: 5
- Losses: 15
- Draws: 2
- No contests: 0

Peter G. Harris (born 23 August 1962) is a Welsh former professional boxer. Harris became Wales featherweight Champion and in 1986 after defeating Kelvin Smart. He briefly held the British featherweight title in 1988 by defeating Kevin Taylor before winning the Welsh title for a second time in 1994. His last professional bout was in 1996.

== Career ==
Harris began his professional career in February 1983, suffering a defeat via a points decision to Dave Pratt. He drew a bout with Jim Harvey before winning his first professional fight in his third bout, defeating Brett Styles on points. In 1986, Harris won the Welsh flyweight title after defeating Kelvin Smart on points.

Three further victories resulted in Harris receiving a title fight against Kevin Taylor for the vacant British featherweight championship. Harris won the bout before losing the title in his first defence against Paul Hodkinson. Harris met Hodkinson in a rematch in his next bout 14 months later, although Hodkinson had won the European title by the time of the fight. Harris lost the rematch via a TKO.

Harris fought for the Welsh featherweight title two more times during his career, losing to Steve Robinson in July 1991 before winning the vacant belt for a second time by defeating Nigel Haddock in May 1994. His final professional fight took place in 1996.

== Personal life ==
Harris was born in Swansea, Wales. His son, Jay, is also a professional boxer and holds the Commonwealth, European and IBF Inter-continental flyweight titles. Harris is his son's trainer.
