= Kevin Taylor (boxer) =

British boxer

Personal information
- Nationality: British
- Born: 10 August 1963 (age 61); Rochdale, England

Sport
- Sport: Boxing

Kevin Taylor (born 10 August 1963) is a British boxer. He competed in the men's featherweight event at the 1984 Summer Olympics.

== Amateur record ==
Taylor won the 1984 Amateur Boxing Association British featherweight title, when boxing out of the Middleton & Rochdale ABC. He then represented Great Britain at the 1984 Olympic Games in the featherweight division.

== Professional record ==
15 fights	11 wins	4 losses
By knockout	4	2
By decision	7	2
Draws	0	

No.	Result	Record	Opponent	Type	Round, time	Date	Location	Notes
15	Loss	11–4	(United Kingdom) Paul Hodkinson	TKO	2 (12)	1988-12-14	(United Kingdom) Sports Centre, Kirkby, England	For BBBofC British Featherweight title.
14	Loss	11–3	(United Kingdom) Peter Harris	PTS	12	1988-02-24	(United Kingdom) Afan Lido, Port Talbot, Wales	For vacant BBBofC British Featherweight title.
13	Win	11–2	(United States) John Boyd	PTS	10	1988-02-09	(United Kingdom) St George's Hall, Bradford, Bradford, England	
12	Win	10–2	(United Kingdom) Steve Pollard	PTS	8	1987-09-22	(United Kingdom) Civic Sports Centre, Oldham, England	
11	Win	9–2	(United Kingdom) Russell Davison	PTS	10	1987-05-26	(United Kingdom) Civic Sports Centre, Oldham, England	Retained BBBofC Central Area Super featherweight title.
10	Win	8–2	(United Kingdom) Les Walsh	PTS	10	1987-03-31	(United Kingdom) Civic Sports Centre, Oldham, England	Won BBBofC Central Area Super featherweight title.
9	Win	7–2	(United Kingdom) George Jones	PTS	6	1987-01-27	(United Kingdom) The Ritz Manchester, Manchester, England	
8	Win	6–2	(United Kingdom) Mike Whalley	TKO	3 (6), 1:32	1986-11-25	(United Kingdom) The Ritz Manchester, Manchester, England	
7	Win	5–2	(United Kingdom) Jimmy Bott	PTS	6	1986-03-04	(United Kingdom) Holiday Inn Liverpool, Liverpool, England	
6	Loss	4–2	(United Kingdom) Des Gargano	PTS	6	1986-02-24	(United Kingdom) Yorkshire Executive Sports Centre, Bradford, England	
5	Win	4–1	(United Kingdom) Dean Bramhald	PTS	6	1985-10-21	(United Kingdom) Yorkshire Executive Sports Centre, Bradford, England	
4	Win	3–1	(United Kingdom) Dean Bramhald	TKO	1 (6), 1:35	1985-09-23	(United Kingdom) Yorkshire Executive Sports Centre, Bradford, England	
3	Win	2–1	(United Kingdom) Denzil Goddard	TKO	4 (6)	1985-04-22	(United Kingdom) Yorkshire Executive Sports Centre, Bradford, England	
2	Loss	1–1	(United Kingdom) John Maloney	KO	3 (8), 0:23	1985-02-18	(United Kingdom) Yorkshire Executive Sports Centre, Bradford, England	
1	Win	1–0	(United Kingdom) Mark Champney	TKO	4 (6)	1985-01-14	(United Kingdom) Yorkshire Executive Sports Centre, Bradford, England	Professional debut.
