= Marcos Villasana =

Mexican boxer

Personal information
- Born: Marcos Villasana Muñoz; June 11, 1960 (age 66) Lomas de Chapultepec, Guerrero, Mexico
- Height: 5 ft 4 in (163 cm)
- Weight: Featherweight

Boxing career
- Reach: 68 in (173 cm)
- Stance: Orthodox

Boxing record
- Total fights: 66
- Wins: 55
- Win by KO: 47
- Losses: 8
- Draws: 3

Marcos Villasana is a Mexican former professional boxer and former WBC featherweight champion.

== Professional career ==
Villasana first challenged Azumah Nelson for the WBC featherweight title, losing a narrow split decision on February 25, 1986. A rematch 18 months later was also unsuccessful, as Nelson won a unanimous decision.

Villasana fought to a draw for the WBA featherweight title against Antonio Esparragoza on June 23, 1988, with Villasana getting a point deducted for a low blow in the 5th round.

Villasana's very next bout was a third shot at the WBC featherweight title against champion Jeff Fenech, which resulted in a unanimous decision defeat. Shortly thereafter, Fenech relinquished the title and moved to the super featherweight division.

Villasana won the vacant WBC featherweight title June 2, 1990, defeating Paul Hodkinson. He successfully defended the title three times including against Ricardo Cepeda in Spain, before losing a unanimous decision rematch to Hodkinson on November 13, 1991.

== Professional boxing record ==
66 fights	55 wins	8 losses
By knockout	47	2
By decision	8	6
Draws	3	

No.	Result	Record	Opponent	Type	Round, time	Date	Location	Notes
66	Win	55–8–3	Javier Lucas	TKO	5 (10)	1993-02-28	Zihuatanejo, Mexico	
65	Loss	54–8–3	Paul Hodkinson	UD	12 (12)	1991-11-13	Maysfield Leisure Centre, Belfast, Northern Ireland, U.K.	Lost WBC featherweight title
64	Win	54–7–3	Ricardo Cepeda	UD	12 (12)	1991-08-15	Plaza de Toros de Puerto Banus, Marbella, Spain	Retained WBC featherweight title
63	Win	53–7–3	Hector Ulises Chong	UD	10 (10)	1991-07-19	Gimnasio Josué Neri Santos, Ciudad Juarez, Mexico	
62	Win	52–7–3	Rafael Zuñiga	TKO	6 (12)	1991-04-11	Arena Coliseo, Mexico City, Mexico	Retained WBC featherweight title
61	Win	51–7–3	Javier Marquez	TKO	8 (12)	1990-09-30	Plaza de Toros Calafia, Mexicali, Mexico	Retained WBC featherweight title
60	Win	50–7–3	Paul Hodkinson	TKO	8 (12)	1990-06-02	G-Mex Centre, Manchester, England, U.K.	Won vacant WBC featherweight title
59	Loss	49–7–3	Jeff Fenech	UD	12 (12)	1989-04-08	National Tennis Centre, Melbourne, Australia	For WBC featherweight title
58	Draw	49–6–3	Antonio Esparragoza	SD	12 (12)	1988-06-23	Sports Arena, Los Angeles, California, U.S.	For WBA & The Ring featherweight titles
57	Win	49–6–2	Jaime Garza	KO	5 (10)	1988-03-24	Sports Arena, Los Angeles, California, U.S.	
56	Loss	48–6–2	Azumah Nelson	UD	12 (12)	1987-08-29	Olympic Auditorium, Los Angeles, California, U.S.	For WBC featherweight title
55	Win	48–5–2	Angel Hernandez	KO	4 (10)	1987-02-05	Olympic Auditorium, Los Angeles, California, U.S.	
54	Win	47–5–2	Alberto Mercado	MD	10 (10)	1986-09-12	UIC Pavilion, Chicago, Illinois, U.S.	
53	Draw	46–5–2	Aristides Acevedo	TD	1 (10)	1986-07-03	Olympic Auditorium, Los Angeles, California, U.S.	
52	Loss	46–5–1	Azumah Nelson	MD	12 (12)	1986-02-25	Forum, Inglewood, California, U.S.	For WBC featherweight title
51	Win	46–4–1	Ricardo Varela	KO	3 (10)	1985-09-26	Olympic Auditorium, Los Angeles, California, U.S.	
50	Loss	45–4–1	Lenny Valdez	SD	10 (10)	1985-07-06	Plaza de Toros Calafia, Mexicali, Mexico	
49	Win	45–3–1	Hector Cortez	TKO	7 (10)	1985-05-02	Sports Arena, Los Angeles, California, U.S.	
48	Win	44–3–1	Antonio de la Paz	TKO	6 (12)	1984-11-17	Olympic Auditorium, Los Angeles, California, U.S.	Retained Mexican featherweight title
47	Win	43–3–1	Idabeth Rojas	TKO	9 (10)	1984-09-13	Olympic Auditorium, Los Angeles, California, U.S.	
46	Win	42–3–1	Rosendo Ramirez	TKO	1 (10)	1984-07-06	The Summit, Houston, Texas, U.S.	
45	Win	41–3–1	Tyrone Downes	TKO	4 (10)	1984-05-17	Olympic Auditorium, Los Angeles, California, U.S.	
44	Win	40–3–1	Ruben Dario Herasme	TKO	3 (10)	1984-03-31	Roberto Clemente Coliseum, San Juan, Puerto Rico	
43	Win	39–3–1	Joaquin Acuna	TKO	7 (12)	1984-03-15	Olympic Auditorium, Los Angeles, California, U.S.	Retained Mexican featherweight title
42	Win	38–3–1	Maximo Ballesteros	TKO	4 (10)	1983-12-08	Olympic Auditorium, Los Angeles, California, U.S.	
41	Win	37–3–1	Justo Garcia	TKO	5 (12)	1983-07-11	Astro Arena, Houston, Texas, U.S.	Retained Mexican featherweight title
40	Win	36–3–1	Santos Moreno	TKO	6 (12)	1983-05-06	Plaza de Toros Alberto Balderas, Ciudad Juarez, Mexico	Retained Mexican featherweight title
39	Win	35–3–1	Gerald Hayes	SD	10 (10)	1983-02-26	Freeman Coliseum, San Antonio, Texas, U.S.	
38	Win	34–3–1	Reyes Gonzalez	KO	2 (12)	1982-11-13	Mexico City, Mexico	Retained Mexican featherweight title
37	Win	33–3–1	Norberto Cabrera	KO	2 (12)	1982-08-27	Mexico City, Mexico	Retained Mexican featherweight title
36	Loss	32–3–1	Mario Miranda	TKO	8 (10)	1982-06-19	Cartagena, Colombia	
35	Win	32–2–1	Juan Paredes	KO	8 (12)	1982-03-19	Acapulco, Mexico	Retained Mexican featherweight title
34	Win	31–2–1	Justo Garcia	PTS	12 (12)	1981-12-18	Arena Coliseo, Acapulco, Mexico	Won Mexican featherweight title
33	Win	30–2–1	Miguel Angel Alvarez	PTS	10 (10)	1981-08-15	Mexico City, Mexico	
32	Win	29–2–1	Cenobio Nicolas	TKO	4 (?)	1981-06-27	Mexico City, Mexico	
31	Win	28–2–1	Federico Carreno	TKO	5 (?)	1981-04-04	Mexico City, Mexico	
30	Win	27–2–1	Artemio Ramirez	TKO	1 (?)	1981-01-31	Mexico City, Mexico	
29	Win	26–2–1	Javier Barcenas	TKO	8 (10)	1980-12-03	Mexico City, Mexico	
28	Win	25–2–1	Carlos Ibarra	TKO	9 (10)	1980-10-15	Mexico City, Mexico	
27	Win	24–2–1	Juan Jimenez	KO	2 (?)	1980-09-24	Mexico City, Mexico	
26	Win	23–2–1	Pablo Ramirez	TKO	1 (?)	1980-07-05	Mexico City, Mexico	
25	Win	22–2–1	Balam Torres	KO	4 (?)	1980-05-01	Acapulco, Mexico	
24	Win	21–2–1	Francisco Parra	KO	8 (10)	1980-03-28	Acapulco, Mexico	
23	Win	20–2–1	Jorge Morales	KO	4 (?)	1980-02-29	Apatzingan, Mexico	
22	Win	19–2–1	Agustin Macias	PTS	10 (10)	1980-01-25	Acapulco, Mexico	
21	Win	18–2–1	Ramiro Garcia	KO	8 (10)	1979-11-30	Acapulco, Mexico	
20	Loss	17–2–1	Ambrosio Luna	UD	10 (10)	1979-10-27	Mexico City, Mexico	
19	Loss	17–1–1	Artemio Ramirez	TKO	7 (10)	1979-07-14	Mexico City, Mexico	
18	Win	17–0–1	Alfonso Ramirez	PTS	10 (10)	1979-06-09	Mexico City, Mexico	
17	Win	16–0–1	Juan Jimenez	KO	8 (10)	1979-05-01	Mexico City, Mexico	
16	Win	15–0–1	Pedro Martinez	KO	4 (?)	1979-03-23	Acapulco, Mexico	
15	Win	14–0–1	Renato Campos	KO	4 (?)	1979-02-01	Acapulco, Mexico	
14	Win	13–0–1	Roberto Martinez	KO	4 (?)	1979-01-01	Acapulco, Mexico	
13	Win	12–0–1	Victor Banos	KO	1 (?)	1978-12-02	Acapulco, Mexico	
12	Win	11–0–1	Jose Jimenez	KO	3 (?)	1978-11-01	Acapulco, Mexico	
11	Win	10–0–1	Chato Nogueda	KO	2 (?)	1978-10-01	Acapulco, Mexico	
10	Win	9–0–1	Ricardo Perez	KO	9 (10)	1978-09-13	Acapulco, Mexico	
9	Win	8–0–1	Gato Clemente	KO	2 (?)	1978-09-01	Acapulco, Mexico	
8	Win	7–0–1	Arturo Cabrera	KO	3 (?)	1978-07-29	Acapulco, Mexico	
7	Win	6–0–1	Pedro Garcia	KO	6 (?)	1978-06-01	Acapulco, Mexico	
6	Draw	5–0–1	Victor Banos	PTS	10 (10)	1978-05-10	Acapulco, Mexico	
5	Win	5–0	Lucerito Montor	KO	2 (?)	1978-05-01	Acapulco, Mexico	
4	Win	4–0	David Perez	KO	1 (?)	1978-04-21	Acapulco, Mexico	
3	Win	3–0	Javier Jimenez	KO	4 (?)	1978-02-10	Acapulco, Mexico	
2	Win	2–0	Flavio Renteria	KO	1 (?)	1978-01-20	Acapulco, Mexico	
1	Win	1–0	Roberto Hernandez	KO	3 (?)	1978-01-11	Acapulco, Mexico	

== Personal life ==
Villasana's son, Marcos Villasana Jr. is also a professional boxer.

== See also ==
- List of Mexican boxing world champions
- List of world featherweight boxing champions

Sporting positions
Regional boxing titles
Preceded by Justo Garcia	Mexican featherweight champion December 18, 1991 – 1984; Vacated	Vacant Title next held by Javier Marquez
World boxing titles
Vacant Title last held by Jeff Fenech	WBC featherweight champion June 2, 1990 – November 13, 1991	Succeeded by Paul Hodkinson
