= Kelvin Smart =

Wales boxer (born 1960)

Personal information
- Nationality: Welsh
- Born: Kelvin Smart; 18 December 1960 (age 65) Caerphilly, Wales
- Weight: Flyweight; Featherweight

Boxing career
- Stance: Orthodox

Boxing record
- Total fights: 29
- Wins: 17
- Win by KO: 7
- Losses: 10
- Draws: 2
- No contests: 0

Kelvin Smart (born 12 December 1960) is a Welsh former professional boxer who competed from 1979 to 1987. He held the British flyweight title from 1982 to 1984.

== Boxing career ==
Smart began his boxing career as a promising amateur, fighting out of the Wingfield Amateur Boxing Club based in his home town of Caerphilly. In 1979 he entered the ABA Championships held at Wembley Arena in London. He reached the final where he lost to Ray Gilbody, who would later become the British bantamweight champion.

Smart turned professional in 1979, facing his first opponent, George Bailey, on 10 September in Birmingham. He stopped Bailey via technical knockout in the fourth round. Smart was active during 1979, following his opening victory with four further limited round bouts; winning each contest. Despite only having five fights under his belt, at the end of 1979 Smart was listed as second only to "Champagne" Charlie Magri in the British flyweight rankings. Smart continued his successful start to his career by beating Ian Murray in early 1980. He followed this with two wins over Iggy Jano and a win over Mohammed Younis, though when Smart and Younis were rematched a month later the referee declared the eight round match a draw. Smart took six months out before returning to the ring in November 1980 to beat Central region bantamweight champion, Steve Enwright.

Smart began 1981 with a trip to Solihull, where he took a unanimous decision over Neil McLaughlin. Three months later, on 20 June, he needed just three rounds to dispatch Eddie Glencross at an encounter at the Empire Pool in Wembley. His third and final match of the year was against Liverpudlian Jimmy Bott on the undercard of Alan Minter's swansong fight at Wembley. Of the seven bouts arranged on that night, Smart's was the shortest, with Bott knocked out in the first round. Smart's unbeaten record of 14 fights led to him being offered a shot at an eliminator for European Flyweight championship against Spain's Enrique Rodríguez. The fight was arranged for 3 March 1981 and was held on the Spaniard's home soil at Oviedo. The fight went the full twelve rounds, and Rodríguez was given the decision.

Despite suffering the first defeat of his career, Smart's was still one of the United Kingdom's top rated flyweight fighters. In the August of the previous year Charlie Magri had vacated his British flyweight title and Smart was lined up to challenge for the title against fellow Welsh fighter Dave George. The match was held on 14 September 1982 at the Empire pool in Wembley, and Smart and George were given top billing in an event that had both Colin Jones and Frank Bruno fighting on the undercard. The fight was scheduled for 15 rounds, but only lasted until the sixth when George was laid out for the count, making Smart the new British flyweight champion.

He fought just twice in 1984, both non-title competitions, against Tito Abella of the Philippines and Canadian Ian Clyde, both results going to Smart. In January 1985, Smart's first title defense of his British title was arranged. His opponent was Hugh Russell of Northern Ireland, and the bout was arranged at King's Hall in Belfast. The 12 round bout changed hands several times in the early stages until a badly swollen eye forced Smart to retire while in his corner between the sixth and seventh round. Smart took ten months out after losing his British belt, and when he returned it was to suffer an unexpected second round defeat to Ivor Jones.

Smart didn't fight throughout 1985 and on his return in January 1986, he took a narrow points decision over Midlands area bantamweight champion Rocky Lawlor. This was the final win of Smart's career. In February a return trip to Belfast saw him disqualified for a low blow against Dave McAuley, while two months later he was only able to draw against an inexperienced Joe Kelly in Glasgow. He followed this with three overseas bouts against difficult opponents; Alain Limarola and Thierry Jacob of France and Guyanese bantamweight champion Michael Parris. He completed 1986 with a challenge for the vacant Welsh featherweight title, but was outclassed by Peter Harris of Swansea. The next year Smart fought twice, losing to Fabrice Benichou in the first round and then a career ending defeat by future British featherweight champion Sean Murphy.

== Professional boxing record ==
29 fights	17 wins	10 losses
By knockout	7	5
By decision	10	4
By disqualification	0	1
Draws	2	

No.	Result	Record	Opponent	Type	Round, time	Date	Location	Notes
29	Loss	17–10–2	Sean Murphy	KO	3 (8), 1:07	22 Apr 1987	Royal Albert Hall, London, England	
28	Loss	17–9–2	Fabrice Benichou	TKO	1 (8)	31 Jan 1987	Le Zénith Sud, Montpellier, France	
27	Loss	17–8–2	Peter Harris	PTS	10	18 Nov 1986	Patti Pavilion, Swansea, Wales	For vacant Welsh Area featherweight title
26	Loss	17–7–2	Thierry Jacob	PTS	8	4 Oct 1986	Calais, Hauts-de-France, France	
25	Loss	17–6–2	Michael Parris	PTS	10	31 Aug 1986	Georgetown, Guyana	
24	Loss	17–5–2	Alain Limarola	KO	2 (8)	16 May 1986	Gymnase Principiano, Le Cannet, France	
23	Draw	17–4–2	Joe Kelly	PTS	8	21 Apr 1986	Albany Hotel, Glasgow, Scotland	
22	Loss	17–4–1	Dave McAuley	DQ	6 (8), 2:22	15 Feb 1986	The Royal Dublin Society, Dublin, Ireland	Smart disqualified due to a low blow
21	Win	17–3–1	Rocky Lawlor	PTS	8	22 Jan 1986	Midland Sc Conference Centre, Solihull, England	
20	Loss	16–3–1	Ivor Jones	KO	2 (10), 1:23	6 Nov 1984	Royal Albert Hall, London, England	
19	Loss	16–2–1	Hugh Russell	RTD	7 (12)	25 Jan 1984	King's Hall, Belfast, Northern Ireland	Lost British flyweight title
18	Win	16–1–1	Ian Clyde	PTS	10	29 Nov 1983	St David's Hall, Cardiff, Wales	
17	Win	15–1–1	Tito Abella	KO	1 (10), 0:25	27 Sep 1983	Wembley Arena, London, England	
16	Win	14–1–1	Dave George	KO	6 (15), 2:00	14 Sep 1982	Wembley Arena, London, England	Won vacant British flyweight title
15	Loss	13–1–1	Enrique Rodríguez	PTS	12	5 Mar 1982	Oviedo, Asturias, Spain	
14	Win	13–0–1	Jimmy Bott	KO	1 (8)	15 Sep 1981	Wembley Arena, London, England	
13	Win	12–0–1	Eddie Glencross	KO	3 (6), 0:55	20 Jun 1981	Wembley Empire Pool, London, England	
12	Win	11–0–1	Neil McLaughlin	UD	8	11 Mar 1981	Midlands Sporting Club, Solihull, England	
11	Win	10–0–1	Steve Enwright	TKO	4 (8), 0:45	26 Nov 1980	Midlands Sporting Club, Solihull, England	
10	Draw	9–0–1	Mohammed Younis	PTS	8	8 May 1980	Midlands Sporting Club, Solihull, England	
9	Win	9–0	Mohammed Younis	PTS	8	1 Apr 1980	Wembley Conference Centre, London, England	
8	Win	8–0	Iggy Jano	PTS	8	19 Mar 1980	Midlands Sporting Club, Solihull, England	
7	Win	7–0	Iggy Jano	PTS	6	12 Feb 1980	Eurocrest Hotel, London, England	
6	Win	6–0	Ian Murray	PTS	6	22 Jan 1980	Double Diamond Club, Caerphilly, Wales	
5	Win	5–0	Chris Moorcroft	PTS	6	28 Nov 1979	Midlands Sporting Club, Solihull, England	
4	Win	4–0	Carl Gaynor	TKO	3 (6)	19 Nov 1979	Top Rank Suite, Birmingham, England	
3	Win	3–0	Bryn Jones	PTS	6	30 Oct 1979	Double Diamond Club, Caerphilly, Wales	
2	Win	2–0	Billy Straub	PTS	6	26 Sep 1979	Midlands Sporting Club, Solihull, England	
1	Win	1–0	George Bailey	TKO	4 (6), 1:35	10 Sep 1979	Top Rank Suite, Birmingham, England	

== See also ==
- List of British flyweight boxing champions
