= Tracy Harris Patterson =

American boxer (b.1964)

Personal information
- Nickname: Caesar
- Born: Tracy Harris; December 26, 1964 (age 61) Grady, Alabama, U.S.
- Height: 5 ft 5 1/2 in (166 cm)
- Weight: Super bantamweight; Super featherweight

Boxing career
- Reach: 67 1/2 in (171 cm)
- Stance: Orthodox

Boxing record
- Total fights: 73
- Wins: 63
- Win by KO: 43
- Losses: 8
- Draws: 1

Tracy Harris Patterson (born December 26, 1964) is an American former professional boxer who competed from 1985 to 2000. He is a world champion in two weight classes, having held the World Boxing Council (WBC) super bantamweight title in 1992 to 1994, and the International Boxing Federation (IBF) junior lightweight title in 1995.

== Personal life ==
Born Tracy Harris in Grady, Alabama, he is the adopted son of former Golden Gloves and world heavyweight champion Floyd Patterson, turned Golden Gloves success into a solid pro career.

== Amateur career ==
As an amateur, Patterson won two New York Golden Gloves Championships. Patterson won both the 1984 119 lbs. Open Championship and the 1985 125 lbs. Open Championship. Patterson trained at the Huguenot Boys Club in New Paltz, New York by his adoptive father, former heavyweight champion Floyd Patterson, a two-time Golden Gloves winner.

== Professional career ==
Patterson turned pro in 1985 and captured the WBC super bantamweight title in 1992 with a TKO over Thierry Jacob. Tracy and his father Floyd are the first father and son to win world titles in boxing. He defended the title four times before losing the belt to Hector Acero Sánchez in 1994. In 1995 he captured the IBF super featherweight title by TKO'ing Eddie Hopson, but lost the belt later in the year when defending against Arturo Gatti. In 1997 he rematched Gatti, but again lost a decision. He retired in 2001 after a draw with a career record of 63–8–2.

== Professional boxing record ==
73 fights	63 wins	8 losses
By knockout	43	1
By decision	20	7
Draws	2	

No.	Result	Record	Opponent	Type	Round, time	Date	Location	Notes
73	Draw	63–8–2	Mike Tidline El	TD	4 (8)	Sep 19, 2000	Kahunaville Night Club, Wilmington, Delaware, US	
72	Loss	63–8–1	Scott Harrison	UD	10	Apr 29, 2000	Madison Square Garden, New York City, New York, US	
71	Win	63–7–1	Adam Salas	UD	8	Jan 28, 2000	The Ruins, New Orleans, Louisiana, US	
70	Loss	62–7–1	Junior Jones	MD	10	Nov 12, 1999	Orleans Hotel & Casino, Las Vegas, Nevada, US	
69	Win	62–6–1	Russell Jones	PTS	10	Jan 29, 1999	Tropicana Hotel & Casino, Atlantic City, New Jersey, US	
68	Loss	61–6–1	Gregorio Vargas	TKO	6 (12), 1:06	Jul 11, 1998	Alamodome, San Antonio, Texas, US	For IBA junior lightweight title
67	Win	61–5–1	German Castro	TKO	1 (8), 3:08	May 19, 1998	Memorial Coliseum, Corpus Christi, Texas, US	
66	Win	60–5–1	Manuel Chavez	TKO	8 (10), 2:21	Dec 20, 1997	Country Club, Reseda, California, US	
65	Win	59–5–1	Rudy Zavala	UD	10	Sep 23, 1997	Foxwoods Resort, Mashantucket, Connecticut, US	
64	Win	58–5–1	Ricardo Vazquez	KO	3 (10)	Jun 21, 1997	War Memorial Auditorium, Syracuse, New York, US	
63	Loss	57–5–1	Arturo Gatti	UD	12	Feb 22, 1997	Convention Center, Atlantic City, New Jersey, US	For IBF junior lightweight title
62	Win	57–4–1	Jose Aponte	TKO	10 (10), 1:57	Dec 6, 1996	Claridge Hotel & Casino, Atlantic City, New Jersey, US	
61	Win	56–4–1	Joseph Figueroa	PTS	10	Jul 25, 1996	Schuetzen Park, North Bergen, New Jersey, US	
60	Win	55–4–1	Harold Warren	UD	10	Apr 14, 1996	Foxwoods Resort, Mashantucket, Connecticut, US	
59	Loss	54–4–1	Arturo Gatti	UD	12	Dec 15, 1995	Madison Square Garden, New York City, New York, US	Lost IBF junior lightweight title
58	Win	54–3–1	Bruno Rabanales	KO	7 (10)	Oct 26, 1995	Marriott Ballroom, Hauppauge, New York, US	
57	Win	53–3–1	Eddie Hopson	TKO	2 (12), 1:37	Jul 9, 1995	Reno-Sparks Convention Center, Reno, Nevada, US	Won IBF junior lightweight title
56	Win	52–3–1	Jose Luis Madrid	KO	3 (?)	Mar 29, 1995	Lexington Avenue Armory, New York City, New York, US	
55	Win	51–3–1	Darryl Pinckney	UD	10	Nov 29, 1994	Resorts Hotel & Casino, Atlantic City, New Jersey, US	
54	Loss	50–3–1	Hector Acero Sánchez	SD	12	Aug 26, 1994	Ballys Park Place Hotel Casino, Atlantic City, New Jersey, US	Lost WBC super bantamweight title
53	Win	50–2–1	Richard Duran	UD	12	Apr 9, 1994	Reno Hilton, Goldwyn Ballroom, Reno, Nevada, US	Retained WBC super bantamweight title
52	Win	49–2–1	Steve Young	TKO	5 (10), 2:13	Jan 8, 1994	Friar Tuck Inn, Catskill, New York, US	
51	Win	48–2–1	Daniel Zaragoza	TKO	7 (12), 2:07	Sep 25, 1993	Mid-Hudson Civic Center, Poughkeepsie, New York, US	Retained WBC super bantamweight title
50	Win	47–2–1	Jesse Benavides	UD	12	Mar 13, 1993	McCann Recreation Center, Poughkeepsie, New York, US	Retained WBC super bantamweight title
49	Draw	46–2–1	Daniel Zaragoza	SD	12	Dec 5, 1992	Palais des Sports, Berck-sur-Mer, France	Retained WBC super bantamweight title
48	Win	46–2	Manuel Santiago	UD	10	Sep 14, 1992	Helsinki, Finland	
47	Win	45–2	Thierry Jacob	TKO	2 (12), 0:50	Jun 23, 1992	Knickerbocker Arena, Albany, New York, US	Won WBC super bantamweight title
46	Win	44–2	Angel Mayor	TKO	1 (10), 2:15	Mar 11, 1992	Paramount Theatre, New York City, New York, US	
45	Win	43–2	Fernando Ramos	KO	1 (10), 2:35	Nov 15, 1991	King Street Palace, Charleston, South Carolina, US	
44	Win	42–2	Gerardo Sanchez	TKO	4 (10)	Aug 3, 1991	Columbus Convention Center, Columbus, Ohio, US	
43	Win	41–2	Francisco Ortiz	KO	5 (10), 1:20	May 31, 1991	Kerhonkson, New York, US	
42	Win	40–2	Vidal Tellez	KO	3 (10)	Feb 4, 1991	Knickerbocker Arena, Albany, New York, US	
41	Win	39–2	Alberto Rendon	TKO	3 (10)	Dec 21, 1990	Sands Hotel & Casino, Las Vegas, Nevada, US	
40	Win	38–2	Julio Blanco	TKO	5 (10), 1:18	Sep 27, 1990	Mid-Hudson Civic Center, Poughkeepsie, New York, US	
39	Win	37–2	Sammy Ruiz	TKO	3 (10), 1:13	Jun 23, 1990	Broome County Arena, Binghamton, New York, US	
38	Win	36–2	Carlos Vergara	TKO	4 (10), 1:25	Jun 8, 1990	Roberts Street High School, Canastota, New York, US	
37	Win	35–2	Kenny Mitchell	TKO	8 (12)	Apr 19, 1990	Mid-Hudson Civic Center, Poughkeepsie, New York, US	Retained NABF super bantamweight title
36	Win	34–2	George Garcia	KO	8 (12), 1:55	Feb 8, 1990	Broome County Arena, Binghamton, New York, US	Won vacant NABF super bantamweight title
35	Win	33–2	Lee Cargle	TKO	3 (10)	Nov 3, 1989	Mid-Hudson Civic Center, Poughkeepsie, New York, US	
34	Win	32–2	Jose Luis Soto	UD	10	Sep 7, 1989	Catholic Youth Center, Scranton, Pennsylvania, US	
33	Win	31–2	Rafael Gandarilla	TKO	2 (10), 2:40	Jul 6, 1989	Mid-Hudson Civic Center, Poughkeepsie, New York, US	
32	Loss	30–2	Steve Cruz	SD	10	May 14, 1989	Trump Plaza Hotel, Atlantic City, New Jersey, US	
31	Win	30–1	Kim Jackson	TKO	7 (10)	Apr 11, 1989	Tyndall Armory, Indianapolis, Indiana, US	
30	Win	29–1	Allan Makitoki	TKO	4 (10)	Feb 17, 1989	Mid-Hudson Civic Center, Poughkeepsie, New York, US	
29	Win	28–1	Robinson Sanchez	UD	10	Dec 2, 1988	Mid-Hudson Civic Center, Poughkeepsie, New York, US	
28	Win	27–1	Mario Gonzalez	KO	2 (10)	Oct 27, 1988	Felt Forum, New York City, New York, US	
27	Win	26–1	Tony Hernandez	TKO	1 (10)	Oct 5, 1988	JJ Whispers, Orlando, Florida, US	
26	Win	25–1	Ron Thomas	TKO	3 (10)	Aug 13, 1988	Civic Arena, Saint Joseph, Missouri, US	
25	Win	24–1	Jay James	TKO	3 (10), 1:32	Jun 4, 1988	Lee County Civic Center, Fort Myers, Florida, US	
24	Win	23–1	Bobby Thomas	TKO	2 (10), 1:57	Apr 1, 1988	Peony Park Ballroom, Omaha, Nebraska, US	
23	Win	22–1	Eddie Jackson	KO	5 (?)	Feb 5, 1988	Civic Center, Glens Falls, New York, US	
22	Win	21–1	Jeff Hanna	KO	3 (10), 2:13	Jan 30, 1988	Orange County Convention Center, Orlando, Florida, US	
21	Loss	20–1	Jeff Franklin	UD	10	Oct 9, 1987	Bally's Las Vegas, Las Vegas, Nevada, US	
20	Win	20–0	Victor Gonzales	TKO	4 (8)	Aug 15, 1987	Bally's Hotel & Casino, Reno, Nevada, US	
19	Win	19–0	Silford Ashby	KO	2 (8), 1:18	Jun 30, 1987	Harrah's Marina Hotel Casino, Atlantic City, New Jersey, US	
18	Win	18–0	Sonny Long	UD	8	Apr 24, 1987	Palmer Auditorium, Davenport, Iowa, US	
17	Win	17–0	Eugene Salazar	TKO	3 (6), 1:36	Feb 6, 1987	Country Club, Reseda, California, US	
16	Win	16–0	Karry Allen	UD	8	Jan 16, 1987	Resorts International, Atlantic City, New Jersey, US	
15	Win	15–0	Richard Campbell	KO	2 (8), 1:45	Dec 13, 1986	Sterling Coliseum, Sterling, Illinois, US	
14	Win	14–0	Felix Cortez	KO	1 (6)	Dec 2, 1986	Resorts International, Atlantic City, New Jersey, US	
13	Win	13–0	Frederick Hall	TKO	1 (8), 2:50	Oct 31, 1986	Sands Casino Hotel, Atlantic City, New Jersey, US	
12	Win	12–0	Tom Elston	PTS	6	Jun 28, 1986	Williamsport Area High School, Williamsport, Pennsylvania, US	
11	Win	11–0	James Woodhouse	PTS	6	Jun 21, 1986	Sands Casino Hotel, Atlantic City, New Jersey, US	
10	Win	10–0	Ricky West	PTS	6	May 21, 1986	Thomas Crystal Gardens, Mount Clemens, Michigan, US	
9	Win	9–0	Mike Parraz	TKO	1 (?)	Mar 26, 1986	Thomas Crystal Gardens, Mount Clemens, Michigan, US	
8	Win	8–0	Darrell Jacobs	UD	6	Mar 21, 1986	Nassau Arena, Long Beach, New York, US	
7	Win	7–0	Walter Cowans	UD	6	Mar 1, 1986	Continental Regency, Peoria, Illinois, US	
6	Win	6–0	Lamont Buchanan	TKO	5 (6), 2:07	Feb 12, 1986	Tomas Crystal Gardens, Mount Clemens, Michigan, US	
5	Win	5–0	Darrell Jacobs	TKO	4 (6), 2:54	Jan 8, 1986	Harrah's Marina Hotel Casino, Atlantic City, New Jersey, US	
4	Win	4–0	Mike Brown	UD	6	Oct 30, 1985	Harrah's Marina Hotel Casino, Atlantic City, New Jersey, US	
3	Win	3–0	Paul Moore	KO	1 (4), 1:38	Sep 18, 1985	Harrah's Marina Hotel Casino, Atlantic City, New Jersey, US	
2	Win	2–0	Paul Mays	TKO	1 (4), 0:38	Jul 19, 1985	Mid-Hudson Civic Center, Poughkeepsie, New York, US	
1	Win	1–0	Ray Doughty	UD	4	Jun 19, 1985	Ice World, Totowa, New Jersey, US	

== Titles in boxing ==
=== Major world titles ===
- WBC super bantamweight champion (122 lbs)
- IBF junior lightweight champion (130 lbs)

=== Regional/International titles ===
- NABF super bantamweight champion (122 lbs)

== See also ==
- List of world super-bantamweight boxing champions
- List of world super-featherweight boxing champions

Sporting positions
Regional boxing titles
Vacant Title last held by Jesus Salud	NABF super bantamweight champion February 8, 1990 – 1991; Vacated	Vacant Title next held by Darryl Pinckney
World boxing titles
Preceded by Thierry Jacob	WBC super bantamweight champion June 23, 1992 – August 26, 1994	Succeeded by Hector Acero Sánchez
Preceded by Eddie Hopson	IBF junior lightweight champion July 9 – December 15, 1995	Succeeded by Arturo Gatti
