= Juan José Mora Municipality =

Juan José Mora Municipality Municipio Juan José Mora
- Municipality
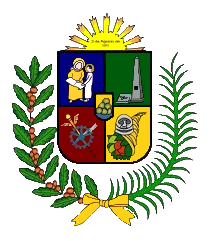
- Flag Coat of arms

- Location in Carabobo

- Location in Venezuela
- Coordinates: 10°27′27″N 68°15′34″W
- Country: Venezuela
- State: Carabobo
- Municipal seat: Morón

Government
  - Mayor: Emily Riera (PSUV)

Area
  - Total: 553.9 km^{2} (213.9 sq mi)

Population (2011)
  - Total: 69,236
  - Density: 125.0/km^{2} (323.7/sq mi)
- Time zone: UTC−4 (VET)
- Area code(s): 0242
- Website: Official website

The Juan José Mora Municipality is one of the 14 municipalities (municipios) that makes up the Venezuelan state of Carabobo and, according to the 2011 census by the National Institute of Statistics of Venezuela, the municipality has a population of 69,236. The town of Morón is the shire town of the Juan José Mora Municipality.

== Demographics ==
The Juan José Mora Municipality, according to a 2007 population estimate by the National Institute of Statistics of Venezuela, has a population of 65,239 (up from 57,701 in 2000). This amounts to 2.9% of the state's population. The municipality's population density is 144.02 inhabitants per square kilometre (373.0/sq mi).

== Government ==
The mayor of the Juan José Mora Municipality is Matson Caldera, elected on November 23, 2008, with 52% of the vote. He replaced José Gregorio Frías shortly after the elections. The municipality is divided into two parishes; Morón and Urama.

== See also ==
- Morón
- Carabobo
- Municipalities of Venezuela
