= Rodolfo Blanco =

Colombian boxer (born 1966)

Personal information
- Born: June 14, 1966 (age 60) San Onofre, Colombia
- Height: 5 ft 4 1/2 in (164 cm)
- Weight: Light flyweight; Flyweight; Super flyweight

Boxing career
- Reach: 64 in (163 cm)
- Stance: Orthodox

Boxing record
- Total fights: 53
- Wins: 30
- Win by KO: 19
- Losses: 22
- Draws: 1

Rodolfo Blanco (born June 14, 1966) is a Colombian former professional boxer who held the International Boxing Federation (IBF) flyweight title in 1992.

== Professional career ==
Blanco became a professional boxer in 1982. In 1987 he challenged Myung Woo Yuh for the World Boxing Association light flyweight title, losing by an eighth-round knockout. In 1990 he once again challenged for a world title, this time in the flyweight class. Northern Irish boxer Dave McAuley defeated Blanco by a unanimous decision to retain the IBF title. Two years later, on June 11, 1992, McAuley and Blanco met again, this time with Blanco prevailing by a unanimous decision and taking the title.

Blanco lost the title in his first defense when Thai Pichit Sitbangprachan knocked him out in three rounds on November 11, 1992. Blanco never won another world championship, although he did win the North American Boxing Federation super flyweight title in 1997. The next year he challenged Johnny Tapia for the IBF and WBO super flyweight titles, losing in twelve rounds.

Blanco continued to fight until 2002.

== Professional boxing record ==
53 fights	30 wins	22 losses
By knockout	19	8
By decision	11	14
Draws	1	

No.	Result	Record	Opponent	Type	Round, time	Date	Location	Notes
53	Loss	30–22–1	Ricardo Medina	KO	4 (10)	2002-08-10	Emerald Queen Casino, Tacoma, Washington, U.S.	
52	Loss	30–21–1	Brahim Asloum	PTS	6 (6)	2001-12-22	Zénith d'Orléans, Orléans, France	
51	Loss	30–20–1	Spend Abazi	KO	5 (8)	2001-11-16	Roskilde Congress & Sports Centre, Roskilde, Denmark	
50	Loss	30–19–1	Hector Javier Marquez	TKO	2 (?)	2001-10-05	Ciudad Juárez, Mexico	
49	Loss	30–18–1	David Toledo	PTS	8 (8)	2000-09-15	JFK High School, Paterson, New Jersey, U.S.	
48	Win	30–17–1	Orlando Gonzalez	TKO	8 (8)	2000-07-18	Fantasy Show, Miami, Florida, U.S.	
47	Loss	29–17–1	Ángel Chacón	UD	8 (8)	2000-06-24	Curt Ivy PAL Gym, Homestead, Florida, U.S.	
46	Loss	29–16–1	Danny Romero	KO	1 (10)	2000-01-08	University Arena, Albuquerque, New Mexico, U.S.	
45	Loss	29–15–1	Adan Vargas	KO	4 (10)	1999-08-21	Miccosukee Resort & Gaming, Miami, Florida, U.S.	
44	Loss	29–14–1	Eric Morel	TKO	6 (6)	1998-09-25	Foxwoods Resort Casino, Ledyard, Connecticut, U.S.	
43	Loss	29–13–1	Cuauhtemoc Gomez	UD	12 (12)	1998-08-08	Mahi Temple Shrine Auditorium, Miami, Florida, U.S.	
42	Loss	29–12–1	Johnny Tapia	UD	12 (12)	1998-02-13	University Arena, Albuquerque, New Mexico, U.S.	For IBF and WBO super-flyweight titles
41	Win	29–11–1	Antonio Jaramillo	PTS	10 (10)	1997-12-06	Oranjestad, Aruba	
40	Win	28–11–1	William Alverzo	UD	12 (12)	1997-08-07	Foxwoods Resort Casino, Ledyard, Connecticut, U.S.	Won vacant NABF super-flyweight title
39	Loss	27–11–1	David Grimán	PTS	6 (6)	1997-06-07	Mahi Temple Shrine Auditorium, Miami, Florida, U.S.	
38	Loss	27–10–1	Elias Juarez	SD	8 (8)	1997-05-10	Curt Ivy PAL Gym, Homestead, Florida, U.S.	
37	Loss	27–9–1	Tomas Cordoba	UD	10 (10)	1996-10-26	Jai Alai Fronton, Miami, Florida, U.S.	
36	Loss	27–8–1	Pichit Sitbangprachan	KO	3 (12)	1992-11-29	Imperial World Center, Samrong Nuea, Thailand	Lost IBF flyweight title
35	Win	27–7–1	Dave McAuley	UD	12 (12)	1992-06-11	Pabellón de La Casilla, Bilbao, Spain	Won IBF flyweight title
34	Win	26–7–1	Agustin Garcia	PTS	10 (10)	1991-04-20	Plaza de toros, Cartagena, Colombia	
33	Loss	25–7–1	Dave McAuley	UD	12 (12)	1990-09-15	King's Hall, Belfast, Northern Ireland	For IBF flyweight title
32	Win	25–6–1	Manuel Julio	KO	1 (?)	1990-03-09	Cartagena, Colombia	
31	Win	24–6–1	Toribio Riasco	TKO	7 (?)	1989-09-01	Plaza de toros, Cartagena, Colombia	
30	Win	23–6–1	Rafael Castro	TKO	6 (?)	1989-07-15	Cartagena, Colombia	
29	Win	22–6–1	Noel Cogollo	KO	10 (?)	1989-05-26	Montería, Colombia	
28	Win	21–6–1	Alfredo Cardales	TKO	3 (?)	1989-04-08	Barranquilla, Colombia	
27	Win	20–6–1	Betulio González	TKO	8 (10)	1988-11-28	Maracaibo, Venezuela	
26	Win	19–6–1	Felix Marti	TKO	6 (?)	1988-07-15	Salón Jumbo Country Club, Barranquilla, Colombia	
25	Win	18–6–1	Eduardo Tunon	KO	2 (10)	1988-03-25	Barranquilla, Colombia	
24	Win	17–6–1	Jose Iriarte	KO	2 (?)	1988-03-04	Santa Marta, Colombia	
23	Loss	16–6–1	Yuh Myung-woo	KO	8 (15)	1987-09-20	Gymnasium, Incheon, South Korea	For WBA light-flyweight title
22	Win	16–5–1	Rafael Ramos	TKO	3 (10)	1987-06-19	Barranquilla, Colombia	
21	Win	15–5–1	Alfredo Gomez	KO	3 (?)	1987-04-04	San Andrés, Colombia	
20	Win	14–5–1	Rafael Julio	PTS	10 (10)	1986-06-21	San Onofre, Colombia	
19	Win	13–5–1	Hermogenes Murillo	PTS	10 (10)	1986-04-30	Salón Jumbo Country Club, Barranquilla, Colombia	
18	Win	12–5–1	Felix Barrios	KO	2 (?)	1986-03-20	Barranquilla, Colombia	
17	Win	11–5–1	Agustin Garcia	PTS	10 (10)	1986-01-31	Plaza de toros, Cartagena, Colombia	Won Colombian light-flyweight title
16	Win	10–5–1	Joselo Perez	TKO	4 (?)	1985-10-18	Cartagena, Colombia	
15	Draw	9–5–1	Benedicto Murillo	PTS	10 (10)	1985-09-27	Salón Jumbo Country Club, Barranquilla, Colombia	
14	Win	9–5	Alfredo Cardales	TKO	5 (?)	1985-08-30	Barranquilla, Colombia	
13	Win	8–5	Arnold Velasquez	KO	5 (?)	1985-06-21	Barranquilla, Colombia	
12	Win	7–5	Jose Iriarte	KO	3 (?)	1985-03-21	Barranquilla, Colombia	
11	Win	6–5	Elvis Álvarez	PTS	8 (8)	1985-03-01	Barranquilla, Colombia	
10	Loss	5–5	Agustin Garcia	PTS	10 (10)	1984-07-27	Cartagena, Colombia	For Colombian light-flyweight title
9	Win	5–4	Leonardo Paredes	PTS	10 (10)	1984-03-11	Barranquilla, Colombia	
8	Win	4–4	Nelson Polanco	PTS	8 (8)	1983-09-19	Sincelejo, Colombia	
7	Win	3–4	Jaime Paternina	PTS	6 (6)	1983-09-15	Sincelejo, Colombia	
6	Win	2–4	Manuel Julio	TKO	5 (?)	1983-07-30	Sincelejo, Colombia	
5	Loss	1–4	Manuel Ariza	TD	4 (4)	1983-03-11	Sincelejo, Colombia	
4	Loss	1–3	Jorge Lugo	PTS	10 (10)	1982-11-06	Colombia	
3	Loss	1–2	Arnold Velasquez	PTS	4 (4)	1982-04-17	Cartagena, Colombia	
2	Win	1–1	Urbano Saltarin	KO	2 (?)	1982-03-20	San Onofre, Colombia	
1	Loss	0–1	Jose Iriarte	PTS	4 (4)	1982-03-05	Cartagena, Colombia	

== See also ==
- List of male boxers
- List of world flyweight boxing champions

Sporting positions
Regional boxing titles
Preceded by Agustín García	Colombian light-flyweight champion January 31, 1986 – 1987; Vacated	Vacant Title next held by Uriel Londono
Vacant Title last held by Hipolito Saucedo	NABF super-flyweight champion August 7, 1997 – 1998; Vacated	Vacant Title next held by Miguel Martinez
World boxing titles
Preceded by Dave McAuley	IBF flyweight champion June 11, 1992 – November 29, 1992	Succeeded by Pichit Sitbangprachan
