= Morón, Venezuela =

Morón
- Santa Ana de Morón
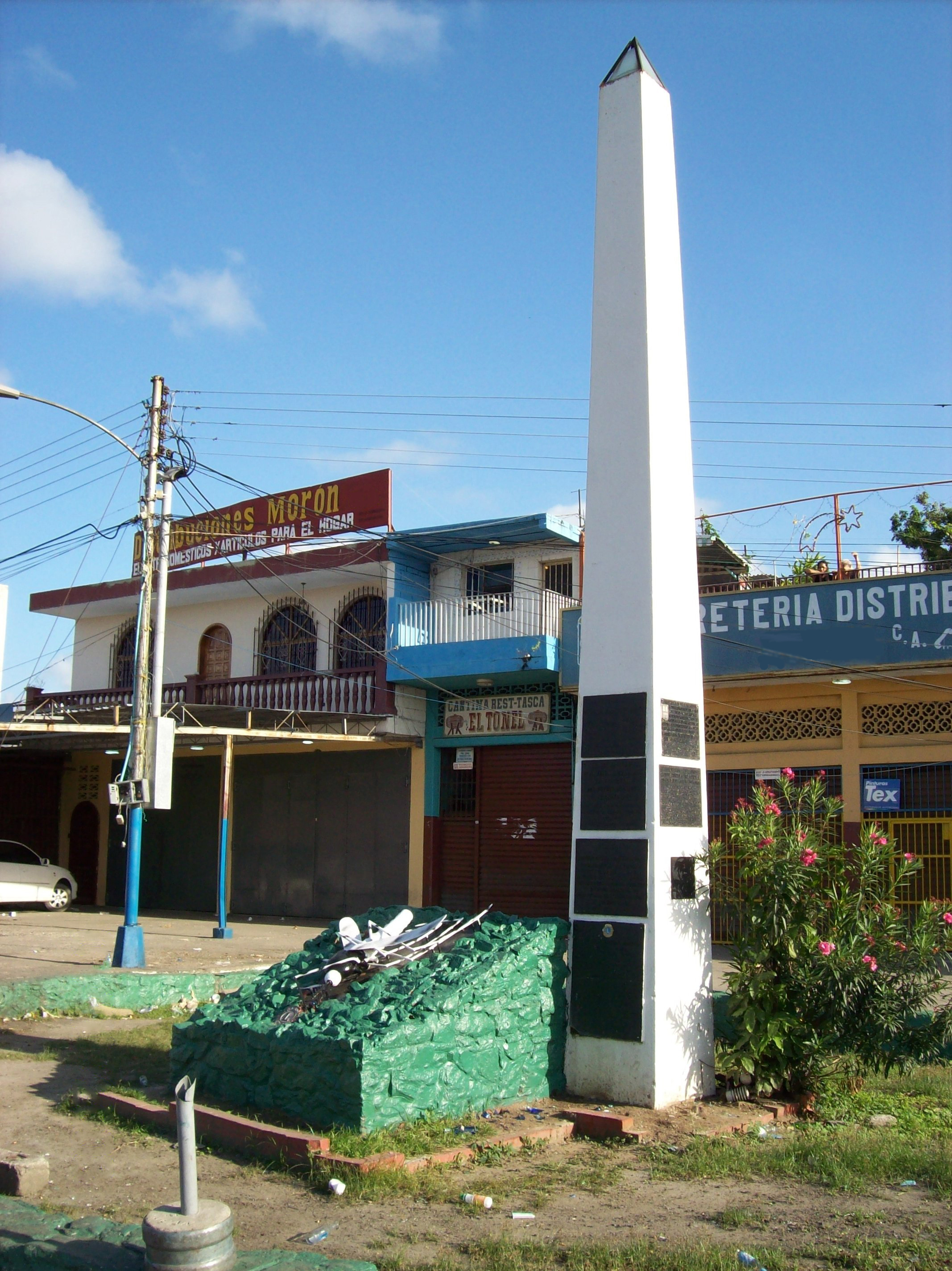

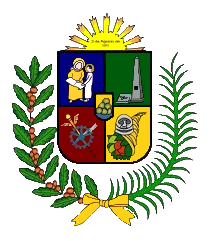
- Coat of arms

- Location within Venezuela
- Coordinates: 10°29′03″N 68°12′15″W
- Country: Venezuela
- State: Carabobo
- Municipality: Juan José Mora Municipality

Population
  - Total: 60,482
- Time zone: UTC−4 (VET)

Morón is a town located on the Caribbean coast of Carabobo state, Venezuela. It is the capital of the Juan José Mora Municipality.

Several important industries are located close by, like El Palito refinery (one of the largest in Venezuela) and the most important electricity centre of Venezuela, Planta Centro. The motorways 1 and 3 join in here and communicate the West with the centre.

== Places of interest ==
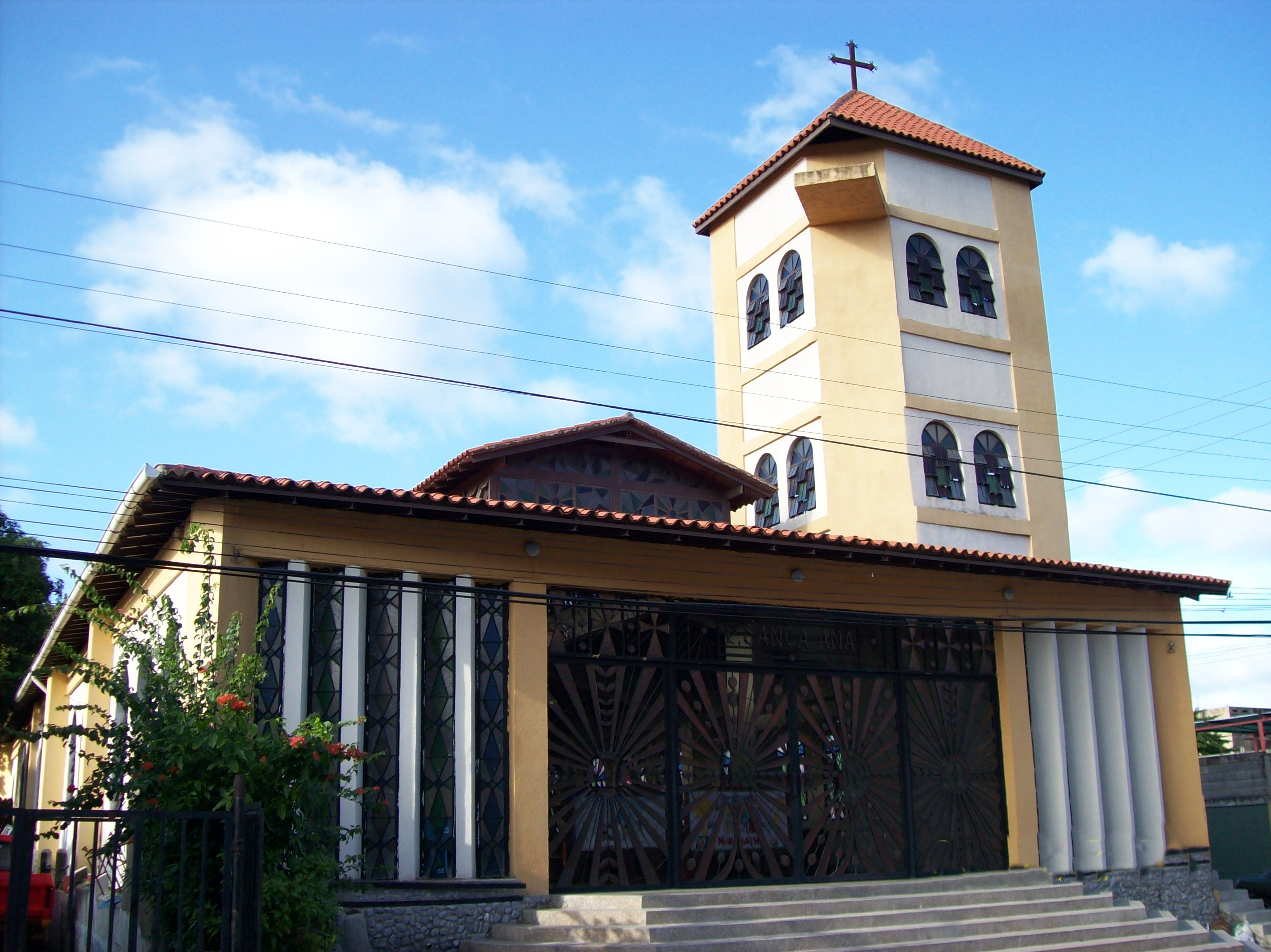
Church of Santa Ana de Morón.

- The Casa de la Cultura or Culture House in the historical centre of Morón
- The Santa Ana church
- Monument to the Mosquito (also in the city centre)

== History ==
Morón appears in the parish registers in the eighteenth century as Santa Ana de Morón. The area was a place where many black slaves who had run away. The slave Andresote took refuge in the mountains of the region and he organized revolts from there.

Morón and other towns of the area were burnt down during the Federal War in 1859.

== Namesakes ==
There are a number of other towns in Venezuela with this name.

== Notable people ==
- Jose Sanabria (born 1963), world champion boxer

== See also ==
- List of cities and towns in Venezuela
