= Thierry Jacob =

French boxer (1965–2024)

Personal information
- Born: 8 March 1965 Calais, France
- Died: 20 December 2024 (aged 59) Calais, France
- Height: 5 ft 6 1/2 in (169 cm)
- Weight: Bantamweight; Super bantamweight

Boxing career
- Stance: Southpaw

Boxing record
- Total fights: 45
- Wins: 39
- Win by KO: 20
- Losses: 6

Thierry Jacob (8 March 1965 – 20 December 2024) was a French professional boxer who competed between 1984 and 1994.

== Professional career ==
Jacob turned professional in 1984 and amassed a record of 26–2 before he unsuccessfully fought Venezuelan boxer José Sanabria, for the IBF super bantamweight world title. Jacob would get another opportunity at a world title nearly four years later, this time facing and defeating Mexican boxer Daniel Zaragoza, to win the WBC world title. Jacob would lose the title in his first defense to American boxer Tracy Harris Patterson.

== Personal life and death ==
Jacob had two sons, Romain and Joffrey, who are also professional boxers.

Thierry Jacob died in Calais on 20 December 2024, at the age of 59.

== Professional boxing record ==
45 fights	39 wins	6 losses
By knockout	20	6
By decision	17	0
By disqualification	2	0

No.	Result	Record	Opponent	Type	Round, time	Date	Location	Notes
45	Win	39–6	Edgar Orlando Ballen	PTS	8 (8)	1994-05-20	Coquelles, France	
44	Loss	38–6	Wilfredo Vázquez	KO	10 (12)	1993-06-24	Vélodrome du Lac, Bordeaux, France	For WBA super bantamweight title
43	Loss	38–5	Wilfredo Vázquez	TKO	8 (12)	1992-12-05	Palais des Sports, Berck-sur-Mer, France	For WBA super bantamweight title
42	Loss	38–4	Tracy Harris Patterson	TKO	2 (12)	1992-06-23	Knickerbocker Arena, Albany, New York, U.S.	Lost WBC super bantamweight title
41	Win	38–3	Daniel Zaragoza	UD	12 (12)	1992-03-20	Chapiteau-Vieux Fort Niculay, Calais, France	Won WBC super bantamweight title
40	Win	37–3	Francisco Gomez	KO	2 (?)	1992-01-18	Calais, France	
39	Win	36–3	Antonio Picardi	RTD	5 (12)	1991-10-06	Calais, France	Retained EBU bantamweight title
38	Win	35–3	Vincenzo Belcastro	UD	12 (12)	1991-04-28	Calais, France	Retained EBU bantamweight title
37	Win	34–3	Duke McKenzie	UD	12 (12)	1990-09-30	Salle Edgar-Quinet, Calais, France	Won vacant EBU bantamweight title
36	Win	33–3	David Long	TKO	5 (?)	1990-05-12	Calais, France	
35	Win	32–3	Raymond Armand	PTS	10 (10)	1990-03-24	Calais, France	
34	Win	31–3	Boualem Belkif	DQ	6 (?)	1990-01-20	Calais, France	
33	Win	30–3	Marvin Stone	PTS	8 (8)	1989-10-28	Calais, France	
32	Win	29–3	Billy Barton	PTS	8 (8)	1989-04-29	Calais, France	
31	Win	28–3	Jose Luis Soto	PTS	8 (8)	1989-04-10	Nogent-sur-Marne, France	
30	Win	27–3	Haidar Nourredine	DQ	3 (?)	1989-03-31	Armentières, France	
29	Loss	26–3	José Sanabria	TKO	6 (12)	1988-11-11	La Salle du Sportica, Gravelines, France	For IBF super bantamweight title
28	Win	26–2	Miguel Pequeno	KO	2 (?)	1988-10-21	Calais, France	
27	Win	25–2	Isidoro Medina	TKO	2 (?)	1988-09-24	Berck, France	
26	Win	24–2	Graham O'Malley	PTS	8 (8)	1988-09-10	Lille, France	
25	Loss	23–2	Fabrice Benichou	KO	9 (12)	1988-01-30	Calais, France	For vacant EBU bantamweight title
24	Win	23–1	Ricky West	KO	2 (?)	1987-11-14	Calais, France	
23	Win	22–1	Juan Castellanos	PTS	8 (8)	1987-10-03	L'Espace International, Gravelines, France	
22	Loss	21–1	Kelvin Seabrooks	RTD	9 (15)	1987-07-04	Calais, France	For IBF bantamweight title
21	Win	21–0	Sammy Ruiz	TKO	4 (?)	1987-05-23	Calais, France	
20	Win	20–0	Ezequiel Hernandez	PTS	10 (10)	1987-04-18	Plaza de Toros de Nimes, Nimes, France	
19	Win	19–0	Alain Limarola	TKO	5 (10)	1987-01-24	Calais, France	Won vacant French bantamweight title
18	Win	18–0	Manuel Carrasco	TKO	2 (8)	1986-11-29	Calais, France	
17	Win	17–0	Bobby McDermott	KO	3 (8)	1986-10-27	Paris, France	
16	Win	16–0	Kelvin Smart	PTS	8 (8)	1986-10-04	Calais, France	
15	Win	15–0	Blas Canovas	TKO	4 (?)	1986-09-12	Paris, France	
14	Win	14–0	Jean Pierre Chartier	TKO	3 (?)	1986-05-30	Grande-Synthe, France	
13	Win	13–0	Freddy Cruz	PTS	8 (8)	1986-05-10	Gravelines, France	
12	Win	12–0	Mohammed Bourras	TKO	3 (?)	1986-04-26	Calais, France	
11	Win	11–0	Kevin Downer	KO	5 (8)	1986-04-05	Bologna, Italy	
10	Win	10–0	German Nunez	KO	1 (?)	1986-03-17	Paris, France	
9	Win	9–0	Francisco Garcia	KO	4 (?)	1986-03-08	Calais, France	
8	Win	8–0	Eloi Kiroffo	TKO	2 (?)	1986-02-08	Lille, France	
7	Win	7–0	Jean Paul Guillard	TKO	1 (?)	1985-12-14	Calais, France	
6	Win	6–0	Eloi Kiroffo	PTS	8 (8)	1985-11-09	Calais, France	
5	Win	5–0	Vincenzo Belcastro	PTS	6 (6)	1985-10-29	Palais Omnisport de Paris-Bercy, Paris, France	
4	Win	4–0	Daniel Rodilla	PTS	6 (6)	1985-04-27	Calais, France	
3	Win	3–0	Jean Pierre Chartier	TKO	3 (?)	1985-01-26	Calais, France	
2	Win	2–0	Abdeloyal Zaouiche	TKO	3 (?)	1984-12-01	Calais, France	
1	Win	1–0	Lionel Jean	PTS	6 (6)	1984-10-20	Calais, France	

== See also ==
- Notable boxing families
- List of world super-bantamweight boxing champions

Sporting positions
Regional boxing titles
Vacant Title last held by Vincenzo Belcastro	EBU bantamweight champion 30 September 1990 – 1992; Vacated	Vacant Title next held by Johnny Bredahl
World boxing titles
Preceded by Daniel Zaragoza	WBC super bantamweight champion 20 March 1992 – 23 June 1992	Succeeded by Tracy Harris Patterson
