= John Davison (boxer) =

British former boxer

Personal information
- Nationality: British
- Born: 29 September 1958 (age 67) Newcastle upon Tyne, England
- Height: 5 ft 5 in (165 cm)
- Weight: Featherweight, super bantamweight

Boxing career

Boxing record
- Total fights: 20
- Wins: 15
- Win by KO: 9
- Losses: 5
- Draws: 0

John Davison (born 29 September 1958) is a British former boxer who held the WBC International titles at featherweight and super bantamweight, and the British title at featherweight. He also fought for the European featherweight title and the WBO world featherweight title.

== Career ==
Davison took up boxing at the age of 25 because he "wanted some trophies to put into a new cabinet he'd bought", reaching an ABA final and going on to represent England 17 times. After missing out on selection for the 1988 Seoul Olympics, he made his professional debut at the age of 29, with two wins over journeyman Des Gargano a week apart in September 1988.

After nine wins from his first ten fights, he stopped the then-unbeaten Srikoon Narachawat in the fifth round in March 1990 to take the WBC International featherweight title. He made two successful defences against Bangsaen Yodmuaydang and Hyung Jae Hwang that year, before facing Fabrice Benichou for the vacant European title in May 1991, losing a unanimous points decision. He bounced back in August 1991 with a sixth-round stoppage of Richard Savage.

In October 1991 he dropped down to super bantamweight to take Plaisakda Boonmalert's WBC International title on a split decision, suffering a broken jaw in the tenth round.

In May 1992 he challenged Benichou for the European title once again, losing to a majority decision.

In September 1992, he faced Tim Driscoll for the vacant British featherweight title in Sunderland. Davison knocked Driscoll out in the seventh round to become British champion.

In April 1993, Davison was set to challenge Rubén Darío Palacios for his WBO world featherweight title, but the Colombian was stripped of the title after being diagnosed with HIV. Steve Robinson was brought in as a late replacement in the fight for the now vacant title, and beat Davison, taking a tight split decision. The fight prompted an early day motion in parliament from Rhodri Morgan MP, commending both boxers and congratulating Robinson on the win.

In December 1993 he defended his British title against Duke McKenzie; McKenzie stopped him in the fourth round, in what proved to be Davison's final fight.

Davison went on to work as a personal trainer.
