= Duke McKenzie =

British boxer

Duke McKenzie MBE
Personal information
- Nationality: British
- Born: 5 May 1963 (age 63) Croydon, Surrey, England
- Height: 5 ft 7 in (170 cm)
- Weight: Flyweight; Bantamweight; Super-bantamweight; Featherweight
- Website: dukemckenziembe.co.uk

Boxing career
- Stance: Orthodox

Boxing record
- Total fights: 46
- Wins: 39
- Win by KO: 20
- Losses: 7

Duke McKenzie MBE (born 5 May 1963) is a British former professional boxer who competed from 1982 to 1998. He is a three-weight world champion, having held the International Boxing Federation (IBF) flyweight title from 1988 to 1989; the World Boxing Organization (WBO) bantamweight title from 1991 to 1992; and the WBO junior-featherweight title from 1992 to 1993. At regional level he held the British flyweight title from 1985 to 1988; the European flyweight title from 1986 to 1988; and the British featherweight title from 1993 to 1994. After retiring from the sport, McKenzie has worked as a boxing commentator for broadcaster ITV.

== Professional career ==
McKenzie has been British champion at two weights, a European champion once and world champion at three different weights. His professional record is 39-7 (20 by KO).

=== Flyweight ===
He won the British flyweight title (5 June 1985) with a fourth round stoppage over Danny Flynn. He later defended this against Charlie Magri (20 May 1986) and added Magri's European flyweight title.

Both titles were relinquished when McKenzie won the IBF flyweight title on 5 October 1988 with an 11th-round knockout over Rolando Bohol.

After two title defences and one non-title, McKenzie lost the IBF flyweight title to Dave McAuley on 7 June 1989 in his first defeat.

=== Bantamweight ===
An unsuccessful challenge for the European (EBU) Bantamweight title on 30 September 1990 saw McKenzie lose to Thierry Jacob of France.

On 30 June 1991 McKenzie became a world champion for a second time, winning the WBO bantamweight title with a 12-round decision over Gaby Canizales. This was lost to Rafael Del Valle on 13 May 1992 when McKenzie suffered his first knockout loss, in the first round.

=== Super bantamweight ===
On 15 October 1992 McKenzie became a three-weight world champion, beating Jesse Benavides after twelve rounds for the WBO Super Bantamweight title. On 9 June 1993, Daniel Jimenez beat McKenzie on points, in his first defence of this title.

=== Featherweight ===
On 18 December 1993 McKenzie became a four-weight regional champion, beating John Davison for the British Featherweight title. An attempt to become world champion at this division ended in a knockout loss to Steve Robinson on 1 October 1994. McKenzie's next fight was an unsuccessful challenge for Mehdi Labdouni's European featherweight title.

McKenzie's last fight, in March 1998, saw him lose in farcical circumstances in the first round to 4-4 Santiago Rojas.

== Life after boxing ==
He previously commentated on boxing for BBC Radio 5 Live and BBC television with John Rawling. He joined ITV with Rawling when boxing returned to the network in September 2005. He has also broadcast for BoxNation, Primetime and Al Jazeera. He also runs a flourishing gymnasium in Purley.

== Personal life ==
He is the brother of former British and European champion Clinton McKenzie, and former amateur boxer and politician Winston McKenzie. On 4 March 1989, Duke witnessed the Purley station rail crash, and was amongst those who helped in the aftermath.

== Professional boxing record ==
46 fights	39 wins	7 losses
By knockout	20	3
By decision	19	4

No.	Result	Record	Opponent	Type	Round, time	Date	Location	Notes
46	Loss	39–7	Santiago Rojas Alcantara	KO	1 (12), 1:04	28 Mar 1998	Crystal Palace National Sports Centre, London, England	
45	Win	39–6	Carl Allen	PTS	8	30 Jun 1997	York Hall, London, England	
44	Win	38–6	Bamana Dibateza	PTS	8	25 Mar 1997	Lewisham Theatre, London, England	
43	Win	37–6	Elvis Parsley	TKO	1	25 Jun 1996	Leisure Centre, Mansfield, England	
42	Loss	36–6	Mehdi Labdouni	PTS	12	28 Apr 1995	Fontenay-sous-Bois, France	For EBU featherweight title
41	Loss	36–5	Steve Robinson	KO	9 (12), 2:40	1 Oct 1994	National Ice Rink, Cardiff, Wales	For WBO featherweight title
40	Win	36–4	Mark Hargreaves	TKO	3 (6)	17 Aug 1994	Hillsborough Leisure Centre, Sheffield, England	
39	Win	35–4	Marcelo Rodriguez	PTS	8	29 Jan 1994	National Ice Rink, Cardiff, Wales	
38	Win	34–4	John Davison	TKO	4 (12)	18 Dec 1993	Wythenshawe Forum, Manchester, England	Won vacant British featherweight title
37	Loss	33–4	Daniel Jiménez	MD	12	9 Jun 1993	Lewisham Theatre, London, England	Lost WBO junior-featherweight title
36	Win	33–3	Jesse Benavides	UD	12	15 Oct 1992	Lewisham Theatre, London, England	Won WBO junior-featherweight title
35	Win	32–3	Peter Buckley	TKO	3 (8)	7 Sep 1992	York Hall, London, England	
34	Loss	31–3	Rafael del Valle	KO	1 (12), 1:56	13 May 1992	Royal Albert Hall, London, England	Lost WBO bantamweight title
33	Win	31–2	Wilfredo Vargas	TKO	8 (12), 0:58	25 Mar 1992	Royal Albert Hall, London, England	Retained WBO bantamweight title
32	Win	30–2	César Soto	UD	12	12 Sep 1991	Latchmere Leisure Centre, London, England	Retained WBO bantamweight title
31	Win	29–2	Gaby Canizales	UD	12	30 Jun 1991	Elephant and Castle Shopping Centre, London, England	Won WBO bantamweight title
30	Win	28–2	Chris Clarkson	TKO	5 (6)	4 Apr 1991	Town Hall, Watford, England	
29	Win	27–2	Julio Blanco	TKO	7 (10), 1:17	7 Feb 1991	Town Hall, Watford, England	
28	Win	26–2	Peter Buckley	TKO	5 (8)	10 Jan 1991	Latchmere Leisure Centre, London, England	
27	Loss	25–2	Thierry Jacob	UD	12	30 Sep 1990	Calais, France	For vacant EBU bantamweight title
26	Win	25–1	Guillermo Flores	PTS	8	8 Nov 1989	Wembley Conference Centre, London, England	
25	Win	24–1	David Moreno	PTS	10	12 Oct 1989	Elephant and Castle Shopping Centre, London, England	
24	Loss	23–1	Dave McAuley	UD	12	7 Jun 1989	Wembley Arena, London, England	Lost IBF flyweight title
23	Win	23–0	Tony DeLuca	TKO	4 (12), 2:03	8 Mar 1989	Royal Albert Hall, London, England	Retained IBF flyweight title
22	Win	22–0	Artemio Ruiz	PTS	10	30 Nov 1988	Elephant and Castle Shopping Centre, London, England	
21	Win	21–0	Rolando Bohol	TKO	11 (12), 2:25	5 Oct 1988	Wembley Conference Centre, London, England	Won IBF flyweight title
20	Win	20–0	Jose Gallegos	PTS	10	4 May 1988	Wembley Conference Centre, London, England	
19	Win	19–0	Agapito Gómez	KO	2 (12)	9 Mar 1988	Wembley Conference Centre, London, England	Retained EBU flyweight title
18	Win	18–0	Juan Herrera	PTS	10	2 Dec 1987	Wembley Conference Centre, London, England	
17	Win	17–0	Jose Manuel Diaz	PTS	8	24 Mar 1987	Wembley Arena, London, England	
16	Win	16–0	Giampiero Pinna	MD	12	17 Dec 1986	Acqui Terme, Italy	Retained EBU flyweight title
15	Win	15–0	Lee Cargle	PTS	10	19 Nov 1986	Atlantic City, New Jersey, US	
14	Win	14–0	Charlie Magri	TKO	5 (12)	20 May 1986	Royal Albert Hall, London, England	Retained British flyweight title; Won EBU flyweight title
13	Win	13–0	Sonny Long	PTS	10	19 Feb 1986	Royal Albert Hall, London, England	
12	Win	12–0	Orlando Maestre	PTS	8	16 Oct 1985	Royal Albert Hall, London, England	
11	Win	11–0	Danny Flynn	TKO	4 (12), 2:10	5 Jun 1985	Royal Albert Hall, London, England	Won vacant British flyweight title
10	Win	10–0	Julio Guerrero	PTS	8	6 Mar 1985	Royal Albert Hall, London, England	
9	Win	9–0	Gary Roberts	KO	1	23 May 1984	Grosvenor House Hotel, London, England	
8	Win	8–0	David Capo	MD	4	15 Jan 1984	Sands, Atlantic City, New Jersey, US	
7	Win	7–0	Alain Limarola	PTS	6	22 Nov 1983	Wembley Arena, London, England	
6	Win	6–0	Jerry Davis	TKO	2 (6)	18 Oct 1983	Tropicana, Atlantic City, New Jersey, US	
5	Win	5–0	Lupe Sanchez	KO	2 (6), 1:59	19 Mar 1983	Convention Center, Reno, Nevada, US	
4	Win	4–0	Gregorio Hernandez	TKO	3	3 Mar 1983	Grand Olympic Auditorium, Los Angeles, California, US	
3	Win	3–0	Dave Pearson	TKO	1	27 Feb 1983	Showboat Hotel and Casino, Las Vegas, Nevada, US	
2	Win	2–0	Andy King	TKO	2 (6), 2:30	24 Jan 1983	Hilton, London, England	
1	Win	1–0	Charlie Brown	TKO	1 (6), 2:08	23 Nov 1982	Wembley Arena, London, England	

== Titles in boxing ==
=== Major world titles ===
- IBF flyweight champion (112 lbs)
- WBO bantamweight champion (118 lbs)
- WBO super bantamweight champion (122 lbs)

=== Regional/International titles ===
- British flyweight champion (112 lbs)
- EBU flyweight champion (112 lbs)
- British featherweight champion (126 lbs)

== See also ==
- List of British world boxing champions
- List of world flyweight boxing champions
- List of world bantamweight boxing champions
- List of world super-bantamweight boxing champions
- List of boxing triple champions

Sporting positions
Regional boxing titles
Vacant Title last held by Hugh Russell	British flyweight champion 5 June 1985 – October 1986; Vacated	Vacant Title next held by Dave McAuley
Preceded by Charlie Magri	European flyweight champion 20 May 1986 – October 1988; Vacated	Vacant Title next held by Eyüp Can
Vacant Title last held by Sean Murphy	British featherweight champion 18 December 1993 – May 1994; Vacated	Vacant Title next held by Billy Hardy
World boxing titles
Preceded by Rolando Bohol	IBF flyweight champion 5 October 1988 – 7 June 1989	Succeeded by Dave McAuley
Preceded by Gaby Canizales	WBO bantamweight champion 30 June 1991 – 13 May 1992	Succeeded by Rafael del Valle
Preceded by Jesse Benavides	WBO junior featherweight champion 15 October 1992 – 9 June 1993	Succeeded by Daniel Jiménez
