= Rafael del Valle (boxer) =

Puerto Rican boxer (born 1967)

Rafael Del Valle
Personal information
- Nationality: (Puerto Rico) Puerto Rican
- Born: Rafael Del Valle; October 16, 1967 (age 59) Santurce, Puerto Rico
- Height: 5 ft 6 in (168 cm)
- Weight: Bantamweight; Super bantamweight

Boxing career
- Reach: 68 in (173 cm)
- Stance: Orthodox

Boxing record
- Total fights: 26
- Wins: 23
- Win by KO: 17
- Losses: 2
- Draws: 1
- No contests: 0
Medal record
Representing Puerto Rico
Pan American Games
Bronze medal – third place	1987 Indianapolis	Bantamweight

Rafael del Valle (born October 16, 1967) is a Puerto Rican former professional boxer who reigned, from May 13, 1992, to July 30, 1994, as the WBO's World Bantamweight champion. A puncher with a sturdy chin, del Valle was born and resides at Santurce, San Juan, Puerto Rico.

== Amateur career ==
del Valle won a bronze medal in the bantamweight category at the 1987 Pan American Games.

== Professional boxing career details ==
del Valle debuted on May 19, 1989, with a victory over the also debuting Hector Correa, at the El San Juan Hotel and Casino at Isla Verde, winning by knockout. del Valle had run his record to 11-0, 8 knockouts, when he fought former two-time world title challenger Juan Carazo, a fellow Puerto Rican, with a WBO number 1 ranking on the line. del Valle outpointed Carazo, 22-4 before their bout, over ten rounds on June 10, 1991, at San Juan, and then outpointed Luis Yampier on November 4, also at San Juan. The Yampier fight was a mismatch that served as a preparation bout for del Valle's upcoming world title challenge; Yampier was 3-4-1 compared to del Valle's 12-0 record at the time.

=== World champion ===
del Valle next traveled to England, where he faced the heavy favorite Duke McKenzie, May 13, 1992. McKenzie, the defending world champion, was 31-2 coming into their encounter, but del Valle was able to win the world title with a highlight-reel first-round knockout win.

del Valle defended the title two times, including wins over fellow Puerto Rican Wilfredo Vargas, stopped in five on March 24, 1993, and over former World Boxing Council Bantamweight world champion, Colombia's Miguel Lora, who was dropped in round ten and beaten by unanimous decision at the Roberto Clemente Coliseum in San Juan on June 19, 1993.

On July 30, 1994, del Valle once again fought in London, this time at the Bethnal Green's York Hall, where he lost for the first time in his professional boxing career, beaten on points by Al Kotey, 17-1, by 12 round unanimous decision to lose the world title.

The loss to Kotey was followed by five wins, four by knockout over mostly overmatched competition; his five rivals' combined record over that period consisted of 34 wins, 32 losses, and four draws; one of them (Miguel Ochoa) had no wins in four previous fights, and another (Alfonso Coronado) was making his debut against the former world champion. Nevertheless, those five wins led to a title try for the WBA's Fedelatin regional title, which del Valle won by knocking out Ramon Guzman, 22-4, on March 9, 1996, in Miami, Florida.

del Valle's last fight was against Mexican Enrique Sanchez, for the WBA's vacant world Super Bantamweight title. del Valle lasted the twelve round distance but lost by unanimous decision on February 8, 1998, at the Harrah's Casino in Lake Charles, Louisiana, retiring soon after.

del Valle had a record of 26 professional boxing bouts, winning 23 (17 by knockout), losing 2, both on points, and drawing (tying) once.

== See also ==
- List of bantamweight boxing champions
- List of Puerto Rican boxing world champions
- List of Puerto Ricans

Achievements
Preceded by Duke McKenzie	WBO bantamweight champion May 13, 1992 – July 30, 1994	Succeeded by Alfred Kotey
