= José Sanabria =

Venezuelan boxer

Jose Sanabria
Personal information
- Born: Jose Sanabria; February 16, 1963 (age 63) Morón, Venezuela
- Height: 5 ft 8 in (173 cm)
- Weight: Super bantamweight

Boxing career
- Reach: 65 in (165 cm)
- Stance: Orthodox

Boxing record
- Total fights: 40
- Wins: 22
- Win by KO: 12
- Losses: 15
- Draws: 3

Jose Sanabria (born February 16, 1963, in Morón, Venezuela) is a former boxer from Venezuela. He was the IBF super bantamweight champion.

== Professional career ==
Sanabria turned professional in 1984 & amassed a record of 12–2–2 before unsuccessfully challenging South Korean boxer Lee Seung-hoon, for the IBF super bantamweight title. Sanabria would go on to challenge for the same title in his next fight & this time win via TKO. He made his first defense against Italy's Vincenzo Belcastro.

== Professional boxing record ==
40 fights	22 wins	15 losses
By knockout	12	2
By decision	10	13
Draws	3	

No.	Result	Record	Opponent	Type	Round	Date	Location	Notes
40	Loss	22–15–3	Victor Llerena	PTS	10	Aug 30, 1996	Cartagena, Colombia	
39	Loss	22–14–3	Jorge Páez	TKO	6 (10)	May 4, 1996	Arrowhead Pond, Anaheim, California, U.S.	
38	Win	22–13–3	Jose Luis Ochoa	KO	4 (?)	Oct 14, 1995	Porlamar, Venezuela	
37	Loss	21–13–3	Julien Lorcy	PTS	8	Aug 23, 1995	La Palestre, Le Cannet, Alpes-Maritimes, France	
36	Loss	21–12–3	Daniel Zaragoza	UD	10	Feb 11, 1995	Jai Alai Fronton, Miami, Florida, U.S.	
35	Loss	21–11–3	Arturo Gatti	UD	12	Nov 22, 1994	Meadowlands Convention Center, Secaucus, New Jersey, U.S.	For USBA super featherweight title
34	Win	21–10–3	Giovanni Nieves	PTS	10	Sep 9, 1994	Caracas, Venezuela	
33	Loss	20–10–3	Juan Polo Perez	UD	8	May 14, 1994	Jai Alai Fronton, Miami, Florida, U.S.	
32	Loss	20–9–3	Luis Mendoza	UD	12	Nov 26, 1993	Puerto La Cruz, Venezuela	For vacant WBA Fedelatin featherweight title
31	Win	20–8–3	Manuel Vilchez	PTS	10	Oct 2, 1993	Caracas, Venezuela	
30	Draw	19–8–3	Giovanni Nieves	PTS	10	Jun 26, 1993	Maracaibo, Venezuela	
29	Win	19–8–2	Luis Zuniga	TKO	6 (?)	May 15, 1993	Caracas, Venezuela	
28	Win	18–8–2	Adelis Chirinos	TKO	8 (?)	Mar 27, 1993	Caracas, Venezuela	
27	Loss	17–8–2	Eugene Speed	SD	12	Aug 26, 1991	La Fontaine Bleue, Lanham, Maryland, U.S.	
26	Loss	17–7–2	Regilio Tuur	SD	10	Jul 23, 1991	Kushers Country Club, Monticello, New York, U.S.	
25	Loss	17–6–2	Louie Espinoza	TKO	6 (10)	Feb 15, 1991	Caesars Palace, Las Vegas, Nevada, U.S.	
24	Loss	17–5–2	Alfred Rangel	UD	10	Jul 24, 1990	Freeman Coliseum, San Antonio, Texas, U.S.	
23	Win	17–4–2	Gino Gelormino	TKO	2 (10)	May 18, 1990	Villa Roma Resort, Callicoon, New York, U.S.	
22	Loss	16–4–2	Fabrice Benichou	SD	12	Mar 10, 1989	La Salle du Sportica, Gravelines, Nord, France	Lost IBF super bantamweight title
21	Win	16–3–2	Thierry Jacob	TKO	6 (12)	Nov 11, 1988	La Salle du Sportica, Gravelines, Nord, France	Retained IBF super bantamweight title
20	Win	15–3–2	Fabrice Benichou	TKO	10 (12)	Sep 26, 1988	Pavillon Baltard, Nogent-sur-Marne, Val-de-Marne, France	Retained IBF super bantamweight title
19	Win	14–3–2	Vincenzo Belcastro	SD	12	Aug 21, 1988	Capo d'Orlando, Sicilia, Italy	Retained IBF super bantamweight title
18	Win	13–3–2	Moises Fuentes Rocha	TKO	6 (15)	May 21, 1988	Coliseo Vicente Diaz Romero, Bucaramanga, Venezuela	Won vacant IBF super bantamweight title
17	Loss	12–3–2	Seung Hoon Lee	SD	15	Dec 27, 1987	Pohang Indoor Gymnasium, Pohang, South Korea	For IBF super bantamweight title
16	Draw	12–2–2	Aaron Lopez	SD	10	Aug 28, 1987	Showboat Hotel & Casino, Sports Pavilion, Las Vegas, Nevada, U.S.	
15	Win	12–2–1	Robert Shannon	MD	10	Jul 5, 1987	Aladdin Hotel & Casino, Las Vegas, Nevada, U.S.	
14	Win	11–2–1	Hurley Snead	MD	10	Jan 23, 1987	Trump Plaza Hotel, Atlantic City, New Jersey, U.S.	
13	Win	10–2–1	Steve McCrory	TKO	5 (10)	Nov 7, 1986	Caesars Tahoe, Stateline, Nevada, U.S.	
12	Loss	9–2–1	James Pipps	UD	10	Jul 31, 1986	Atlantic City, New Jersey, U.S.	
11	Win	9–1–1	Rogelio Chacin	KO	1 (?)	Dec 21, 1985	Valencia, Venezuela	
10	Win	8–1–1	Felix Guzman	PTS	10	Sep 2, 1985	Catia La Mar, Venezuela	
9	Win	7–1–1	Luis Aparicio	TKO	2 (?)	Jun 8, 1985	Caracas, Venezuela	
8	Win	6–1–1	Ed Alcala	PTS	6	Mar 1, 1985	Venezuela	
7	Win	5–1–1	Jose Villegas	TKO	3 (?)	Sep 3, 1984	San Felipe, Venezuela	
6	Win	4–1–1	Ali Camacho	PTS	6	Aug 16, 1984	Carupano, Venezuela	
5	Win	3–1–1	Felix Benitez	TKO	2 (4)	Jul 13, 1984	Carupano, Venezuela	
4	Draw	2–1–1	Felix Benitez	PTS	4	Jun 16, 1984	Maracay, Venezuela	
3	Win	2–1	Alfonso Rendon	PTS	4	May 25, 1984	Barquisimeto, Venezuela	
2	Loss	1–1	Ali Camacho	PTS	4	Apr 13, 1984	Barquisimeto, Venezuela	
1	Win	1–0	Wilfredo Navas	PTS	4	Mar 30, 1984	Ciudad Bolivar, Venezuela	

== See also ==
- List of world super-bantamweight boxing champions

Sporting positions
World boxing titles
Vacant Title last held by Lee Seung-hoon	IBF super bantamweight champion May 21, 1988 – March 10, 1989	Succeeded by Fabrice Benichou
