= Paul Hodkinson =

English boxer (born 1965)

Personal information
- Nickname: Hoko
- Nationality: British
- Born: Paul Hodkinson; 14 September 1965 (age 60) Kirkby, Liverpool, England
- Height: 5 ft 4 in (163 cm)
- Weight: Featherweight

Boxing career
- Reach: 64 in (163 cm)
- Stance: Orthodox

Boxing record
- Total fights: 26
- Wins: 22
- Win by KO: 21
- Losses: 3
- Draws: 1

Paul Hodkinson (born 14 September 1965) is a former professional boxer. Hodkinson fought at Featherweight and is the former British, European and World (WBC) Featherweight Title holder.

== Amateur career ==
Paul Hodkinson first caught the eye as an amateur bantamweight in the 1984–85 season with a series of good displays for young England, he later controversially beat the promising Troy Birkin in a tight contest for the privilege of representing England. Hodkinson won and later represented the full international side; but John Davidson a hard hitting and mature Northerner proved a little too rugged for him and Hodkinson's ABA title campaign came to an abrupt finish in the first round.

The one round defeat prompted a rethink in the Kirkby club – whose 'old boys' included John Conteh and Joey Singleton – and Hodkinson decided it was time to stop fighting the scales and let his body find its true poundage. As a featherweight the improvement was instantaneous. He had an excellent 1986 ABA title campaign winning the Amateur Boxing Association British featherweight title, when boxing out of the Kirkby ABC and he swept aside all comers in capturing his club's first national title since Conteh's success in 1971.

With the 1986 Commonwealth Games taking place in the summer, Hodkinson was an automatic selection and in most experts' view a clear favourite for the featherweight gold. Hodkinson had other ideas, he had already decided to turn pro. His amateur days ended in acrimony with him being 'expelled' from the games panel for failing to report for training. He was in America where he was given the chance to spar with some of the top fighters in the world. Hodkinson had sparred with six world champions in the shape of Sot Chitalada, Hilario Zapata, Bernardo Pinango, Barry McGuigan, Brian Mitchell and Antonio Esparragoza.

== Professional career ==
Hodkinson turned professional with BJ Eastwood and the new team was launched at Wembley Stadium on the night Frank Bruno was beaten by Tim Witherspoon, fighting in front of the biggest live audience in decades. Hodkinson beat Mark Champney in two rounds to get his career underway. Hodkinson stopped his first seven opponents inside the distance, his most memorable win coming against former British Featherweight champion Steve Sims in the King's Hall in Belfast.

In July 1987 the same year he was voted Grandstand's Young Prospect of The Year, a title he shared with Gary Stretch. Hodkinson travelled to Panama with BJ Eastwood where he sparred with Brian Mitchell for three weeks preparing the WBA Super-featherweight king for his defence against local favourite Rocky Fernandez. Hodkinson fought and drew with Tomas Arguelles on the under card. The Panamanian was Hodkinson's toughest opponent to date but many neutral observers felt the young Liverpudlian came out on the wrong end of a 'home town' decision. Hodkinson was quick to avenge the only blemish on his record when he stopped Arguelles in six rounds the following October.

After beating the capable Dubliner Ritchie Foster in three rounds Hoko went to Wales to challenge Peter Harris for the British Featherweight title in just his 12th professional contest. He won the title and successfully defended it, stopping Kevin Taylor in two rounds in December 1988. By April the following year Hodkinson had beaten Frenchman Raymond Armand to win the vacant European title in two rounds, and won a Lonsdale belt outright when he stopped Peter Harris, defending his British title.

Hodkinson then defended his European title against rugged Frenchman Farid Benredjeb. Like Peter Harris the 'teak-tough' Algerian had never been stopped or been on the canvas before meeting Hodkinson and his French handlers, the Acaries brothers considered Benredjeb to be un-stoppable. Showing what an exciting fighter he is, Hodkinson put on a display of powerful combination punching with great accuracy and hand speed to stop the challenger. Hodkinson had outclassed the best in Europe and was ready to fight at the highest level. In March 1990 at the G-Mex Manchester Hodkinson fought in a world title final eliminator when he stopped Mexican Eduardo Montoya in three rounds, but not before he was on the canvas himself for the first time in his professional career. In the first round Hodkinson had the Mexican down twice and moved in to finish when Montoya was apparently there for the taking. Carelessly Hodkinson was caught by a sucker right hand and paid the penalty. The Mexican was not in as much trouble as he appeared to be in, and Hodkinson, misjudged the situation as did everyone else in the audience.

Unbeaten in 18 contests (17 stoppages) Hodkinson then fought for the vacant WBC featherweight title against Marcos Villasana. After seven rounds Hodkinson was ahead on points on all three judges scorecards, but was forced to retire in the eighth when he could no longer see through his swollen eyes. He had put up a solid and brave performance and proved beyond doubt that he is a world class fighter.

In October 1991 Hodkinson defended his European title and ko’d Guy Bellehigue in three rounds, before relinquishing it and concentrating on his pursuit of a world title; an objective he achieved when he comprehensively beat Villasana in a re-match in Belfast in 1991.

Hodkinson defended his title twice in 1992. After defeating a shopworn Steve Cruz in three rounds in April 1992, he travelled to France and stopped Fabrice Benichou in the 10th round of a tough fight. At the time of the stoppage, one judge had the fight level, the other two had Hoko ahead.

Perhaps the best performance of Hodkinson's career was to stop Ricardo Cepeda in the fourth round (February 1993) for his third defence. Cepeda came with a good reputation, having failed on points to beat Villasana 18 months previously, a decision which was hotly disputed at the time. However Hodkinson never allowed the Puerto Rican to settle, hitting him with a barrage of combination punches until the referee intervened.

A match with the American Kevin Kelley and British fighter Colin McMillan were mooted but Hodkinson first had to deal with WBC mandatory challenger Goyo Vargas. He stopped Hodkinson in seven rounds. Hodkinson's next fight was another defeat; this time in a WBO title fight against the Welshman Steve Robinson, when he was stopped in the final round. Hodkinson never fought again.

== Life after boxing ==
Hodkinson has been an ambassador for boxing and has appeared on A Question of Sport, Grandstand and has featured in openings with Muhammad Ali.

== Personal life ==
Hodkinson lives in Kirkby and is father of four boys Kevin, Jason, Lewis and Dylan

== Professional boxing record ==
26 fights	22 wins	3 losses
By knockout	21	3
By decision	1	0
Draws	1	

No.	Result	Record	Opponent	Type	Round, time	Date	Location	Notes
26	Loss	22–3–1	(United Kingdom) Steve Robinson	KO	12 (12), 1:40	1994-03-12	(United Kingdom) National Ice Rink, Cardiff, Wales	For WBO Featherweight title.
25	Loss	22–2–1	(Mexico) Gregorio Vargas	TKO	7 (12), 2:27	1993-04-28	(Republic of Ireland) National Stadium, Dublin, Ireland	Lost WBC Featherweight title.
24	Win	22–1–1	(United States) Ricardo Cepeda	TKO	4 (12), 0:37	1993-02-03	(United Kingdom) Earls Court Exhibition Centre, Kensington, London, England	Retained WBC Featherweight title.
23	Win	21–1–1	(France) Fabrice Benichou	TKO	10 (12), 1:35	1992-09-12	Patinoire de Toulouse, Blagnac, France	Retained WBC Featherweight title.
22	Win	20–1–1	(United States) Steve Cruz	TKO	3 (12), 1:05	1992-04-25	(United Kingdom) Maysfield Leisure Centre, Belfast, Northern Ireland	Retained WBC Featherweight title.
21	Win	19–1–1	(Mexico) Marcos Villasana	UD	12	1991-11-13	(United Kingdom) Maysfield Leisure Centre, Belfast, Northern Ireland	Won WBC Featherweight title.
20	Win	18–1–1	(France) Guy Bellehigue	KO	3 (12), 0:47	1990-10-31	(United Kingdom) Grand, Wembley, London, England	Retained EBU European Featherweight title.
19	Loss	17–1–1	(Mexico) Marcos Villasana	TKO	8 (12), 2:58	1990-06-02	(United Kingdom) Greater Manchester Exhibition Centre, Manchester, England	For WBC Featherweight title.
18	Win	17–0–1	(Mexico) Eduardo Montoya	TKO	3 (10), 0:29	1990-03-28	(United Kingdom) Greater Manchester Exhibition Centre, Manchester, England	
17	Win	16–0–1	(France) Farid Benredjeb	TKO	8 (12), 1:40	1989-12-13	(United Kingdom) Sports Centre, Kirkby, England	Retained EBU European Featherweight title.
16	Win	15–0–1	(United Kingdom) Peter Harris	TKO	9 (12)	1989-09-06	(United Kingdom) Afan Lido, Port Talbot, Wales	Retained EBU European Featherweight and BBBofC British Featherweight titles.
15	Win	14–0–1	(France) Raymond Armand	TKO	2 (12)	1989-04-12	(United Kingdom) Ulster Hall, Belfast, Northern Ireland	Won vacant EBU European Featherweight title.
14	Win	13–0–1	(United States) Johnny Carter	KO	1 (10), 2:26	1989-01-18	(United Kingdom) Royal Albert Hall, South Kensington, London, England	
13	Win	12–0–1	(United Kingdom) Kevin Taylor	TKO	2 (12)	1988-12-14	(United Kingdom) Sports Centre, Kirkby, England	Retained BBBofC British Featherweight title.
12	Win	11–0–1	(United Kingdom) Peter Harris	TKO	12 (12)	1988-05-18	(United Kingdom) Afan Lido, Port Talbot, Wales	Won BBBofC British Featherweight title.
11	Win	10–0–1	(Republic of Ireland) Richie Foster	TKO	3 (10)	1988-01-27	(United Kingdom) Ulster Hall, Belfast, Northern Ireland	
10	Win	9–0–1	(Panama) Marcos Smith	TKO	7 (8)	1987-12-07	(United Kingdom) Ulster Hall, Belfast, Northern Ireland	
9	Win	8–0–1	(Panama) Tomas Arguelles	KO	6 (8)	1987-10-19	(United Kingdom) Ulster Hall, Belfast, Northern Ireland	
8	Draw	7–0–1	(Panama) Tomas Arguelles	PTS	8	1987-07-31	Gimnasio Nuevo Panama, Panama City, Panama	
7	Win	7–0	(United Kingdom) Russell Jones	TKO	6 (8)	1987-04-25	(United Kingdom) Ulster Hall, Belfast, Northern Ireland	
6	Win	6–0	(France) Kamel Djadda	TKO	4 (8)	1987-02-26	(United Kingdom) York Hall, Bethnal Green, London, England	
5	Win	5–0	(United Kingdom) Steve Sims	KO	5 (8)	1987-01-17	(United Kingdom) Ulster Hall, Belfast, Northern Ireland	
4	Win	4–0	(United Kingdom) Craig Windsor	KO	2 (6), 1:30	1986-10-29	(United Kingdom) Ulster Hall, Belfast, Northern Ireland	
3	Win	3–0	(United Kingdom) Les Remikie	RTD	4 (6)	1986-09-29	(United Kingdom) NSC Grosvenor House, Mayfair, London, England	
2	Win	2–0	(United Kingdom) Phil Lashley	TKO	2 (6)	1986-09-17	(United Kingdom) Royal Albert Hall, South Kensington, London, England	
1	Win	1–0	(United Kingdom) Mark Champney	KO	2 (6)	19 July 1986	(United Kingdom) Wembley Stadium, Wembley, London, England	Professional debut.

== See also ==
- List of world featherweight boxing champions
- List of British world boxing champions
- List of outright winners of the Lonsdale belt

Sporting positions
Amateur boxing titles
Previous: Floyd Havard	ABA Featherweight champion 1986	Next: Peter English
Regional boxing titles
Preceded by Peter Harris	British featherweight champion 18 May 1988 – 1990; Vacated	Vacant Title next held by Sean Murphy
Vacant Title last held by Jean Marc Renard	European featherweight champion 12 April 1989 – 1991; Vacated	Vacant Title next held by Fabrice Benichou
World boxing titles
Preceded by Marcos Villasana	WBC featherweight champion 13 November 1991 – 28 April 1993	Succeeded by Gregorio Vargas
