= Eddie Hopson =

American boxer

Personal information
- Nickname: Fast
- Born: Edward Lamar Hopson; June 30, 1971 St. Louis, Missouri, U.S.
- Died: June 20, 2022 (aged 50) St. Louis, Missouri, U.S.
- Height: 5 ft 4 in (163 cm)
- Weight: Super featherweight

Boxing career
- Reach: 62 in (157 cm)
- Stance: Southpaw

Boxing record
- Total fights: 32
- Wins: 30
- Win by KO: 14
- Losses: 2

Edward Lamar Hopson (June 30, 1971 – June 20, 2022) was an American professional boxer who held the world super-featherweight title.

== Early life ==
Hopson was born to St. Louis natives, Edward and Mittie Hopson, nee Walters.

== Amateur career ==
Hopson took up boxing at the age of seven. Hopson earned a Junior Olympics gold medal in 1987, and was the National Golden Gloves Featherweight Champion the following year. Later in 1988, he won the Olympic Trials in the featherweight division; after a semifinal victory against world amateur champion Kelcie Banks, Hopson took a 3–2 decision over Carl Daniels. However, at the Olympic Boxoffs, Hopson lost to Banks in a pair of fights; because of these losses, he did not compete in the 1988 Summer Olympics.

== Professional career ==
Known as "Fast" Eddie, Hopson turned pro in 1989 and captured the vacant International Boxing Federation super featherweight title in 1995 with a knockout win over Moises Pedroza. He lost the belt in his first defense, to Tracy Harris Patterson, later that year by 2nd round technical knockout (TKO), a round in which Hopson had four knockdowns recorded against him.

== Professional boxing record ==
32 fights	30 wins	2 losses
By knockout	14	2
By decision	16	0

No.	Result	Record	Opponent	Type	Round, time	Date	Location	Notes
32	Win	30–2	Daniel Sarmiento	UD	8 (8)	1999-11-19	Grand Casino, Tunica Resorts, Mississippi, U.S.	
31	Win	29–2	Luis Alfonso Lizarraga	UD	8 (8)	1999-09-10	Grand Casino, Biloxi, Mississippi, U.S.	
30	Win	28–2	Eduardo Martinez	TKO	6 (8)	1998-03-31	Casino Magic, Bay St. Louis, Mississippi, U.S.	
29	Loss	27–2	Santos Lopez	TKO	10 (10)	1995-11-18	Boardwalk Hall, Atlantic City, New Jersey, U.S.	
28	Win	27–1	Tialano Tovar	PTS	8 (8)	1995-10-07	Boardwalk Hall, Atlantic City, New Jersey, U.S.	
27	Loss	26–1	Tracy Harris Patterson	TKO	2 (12)	1995-07-09	Reno-Sparks Convention Center, Reno, Nevada, U.S.	Lost IBF super featherweight title
26	Win	26–0	Moises Pedroza	KO	7 (12)	1995-04-22	Bally's Park Place, Atlantic City, New Jersey, U.S.	Won vacant IBF super featherweight title
25	Win	25–0	Troy Dorsey	UD	12 (12)	1994-10-27	Hilton & Towers, Washington, D.C., U.S.	Retained NABF super-featherweight title
24	Win	24–0	Ángel Aldama	TD	9 (12)	1994-08-23	Cowtown Coliseum, Fort Worth, Texas, U.S.	Retained NABF super-featherweight title
23	Win	23–0	Bryan Jones	TKO	5 (?)	1994-06-28	Meadowlands Convention Centre, Secaucus, New Jersey, U.S.	
22	Win	22–0	Alex Perez	UD	12 (12)	1994-01-04	War Memorial Auditorium, Fort Lauderdale, Florida, U.S.	Won vacant NABF super-featherweight title
21	Win	21–0	Jesus Poll	UD	10 (10)	1993-10-12	Virginia Beach, Virginia, U.S.	
20	Win	20–0	Hector Javier Monjardin	KO	6 (10)	1993-03-23	HemisFair Arena, San Antonio, Texas, U.S.	
19	Win	19–0	Alvaro Bohorquez	UD	10 (10)	1993-01-09	Houston, Texas, U.S.	
18	Win	18–0	Tony Duran	UD	8 (8)	Jul 18, 1992	The Mirage, Paradise, Nevada, U.S.	
17	Win	17–0	Robert Byrd	KO	3 (8)	May 9, 1992	The Mirage, Paradise, Nevada, U.S.	
16	Win	16–0	Daniel Hinojosa	TKO	1 (6)	1992-02-01	Caesars Palace, Paradise, Nevada, U.S.	
15	Win	15–0	Juan Batista Bisono	TKO	5 (?)	Jan 10, 1992	Paramount Theater, New York City, New York, U.S.	
14	Win	14–0	Chris Crespin	UD	6 (6)	1991-08-30	Memorial Coliseum, Corpus Christi, Texas, U.S.	
13	Win	13–0	Brad Savage	KO	1 (?)	1991-07-27	Scope Arena, Norfolk, Virginia, U.S.	
12	Win	12–0	Jesse Martinez	KO	4 (6)	1991-06-14	ARCO Arena, Sacramento, California, U.S.	
11	Win	11–0	Miguel Melendez	KO	3 (6)	1991-05-18	Reno-Sparks Convention Center, Reno, Nevada, U.S.	
10	Win	10–0	Curtis Mathis	UD	6 (6)	1991-04-20	Caesars, Atlantic City, New Jersey, U.S.	
9	Win	9–0	Willie Richardson	TKO	1 (6)	1991-01-19	Boardwalk Hall, Atlantic City, New Jersey, U.S.	
8	Win	8–0	Carlos Marquez	UD	6 (6)	1990-12-01	ARCO Arena, Sacramento, California, U.S.	
7	Win	7–0	Gerald Shelton	UD	6 (6)	1990-04-25	Triton College, River Grove, Illinois, U.S.	
6	Win	6–0	Pablo Ramos	TKO	2 (?)	1990-01-28	Trump Casino Hotel, Atlantic City, New Jersey, U.S.	
5	Win	5–0	Sonny Long	UD	6 (6)	1989-11-27	Civic Center, Providence, Rhode Island, U.S.	
4	Win	4–0	David Moreno	UD	6 (6)	1989-09-03	Civic Center, Pensacola, Florida, U.S.	
3	Win	3–0	Wilfredo De La Cruz	KO	3 (4)	1989-07-09	Showboat Hotel, Atlantic City, New Jersey, U.S.	
2	Win	2–0	Richard Garcia	TKO	1 (6)	1989-06-18	Caesars Tahoe, Stateline, Nevada, U.S.	
1	Win	1–0	Marcos Covarrubias	UD	4 (4)	Feb 4, 1989	Caesars Palace, Paradise, Nevada, U.S.	

== Death ==
Edward Hopson died June 20, 2022, in St. Louis, Missouri, due to complications with pancreatitis. His family held a small service in Spanish Lake, Missouri, and he is buried in Oak Grove Cemetery.

== See also ==
- List of southpaw stance boxers
- List of world super-featherweight boxing champions

Sporting positions
Amateur boxing titles
Previous: Donald Stokes	Golden Gloves featherweight champion 1988	Next: Oscar De La Hoya
Regional boxing titles
Vacant Title last held by Frank Avelar	NABF super-featherweight champion January 4, 1994 – 1995; Vacated	Vacant Title next held by Robert Garcia
World boxing titles
Vacant Title last held by John John Molina	IBF super-featherweight champion April 22, 1995 – July 9, 1995	Succeeded by Tracy Harris Patterson
