= Lee Seung-hoon (boxer) =

South Korean boxer (born 1960)

Personal information
- Nickname: Oriental Pearl
- Nationality: South Korean
- Born: July 26, 1960 (age 66) Cheongwon, North Chungcheong Province, South Korea
- Height: 5 ft 7.5 in (1.71 m)
- Weight: Super bantamweight

Boxing career
- Stance: Orthodox

Boxing record
- Total fights: 52
- Wins: 45
- Win by KO: 25
- Losses: 6
- Draws: 1

- Lee Seung-hoon
- Hangul: 이승훈
- Hanja: 李承勳
- RR: I Seunghun
- MR: I Sŭnghun

Lee Seung-hoon (Korean: 이승훈; Hanja: 李承勳; [i sʰɯŋ.ɸuːn]; born July 26, 1960) is a South Korean former professional boxer who competed from 1977 to 1989.

== Pro career ==
Lee early received first two losses to former WBC Light Flyweight champion Netrnoi Sor Vorasingh and future WBA Light Flyweight champion Kim Hwan-jin after making his pro debut in 1977. However, Lee won the Korean Flyweight title in 1978 and beat future WBC Flyweight champion Prudencio Cardona in a non-title bout by decision in 1979.

In 1980, he moved up in weight to super flyweight but unsuccessfully challenged Rafael Orono for the vacant WBC Super Flyweight title in Caracas, Venezuela, losing by a highly controversial split decision.

In 1981, Lee moved up to bantamweight after beating former WBC Light Flyweight champion Kim Sung-jun, and challenged Lupe Pintor for the WBC Bantamweight title in Los Angeles, United States on June 3, 1982. He had an impressive performance against the Mexican hard puncher, knocking down Pintor in the fifth round, but eventually lost via stoppage in the eleventh round.

Following the loss to Pintor, Lee moved up in weight again to super bantamweight. At super bantamweight, he defeated former WBA Super Bantamweight champion Ricardo Cardona via sixth round KO, and challenged Victor Callejas for the WBA Super Bantamweight title in San Juan, Puerto Rico on February 2, 1985. Lee got dropped in round two by Callejas and lost by a 15-rounds unanimous decision to him.

Lee was given another chance to fight for the world title when in December 1986, IBF Super Bantamweight champion Kim Ji-won announced his retirement as a professional boxer. On January 18, 1987, Lee faced OPBF champion Prayurasak Muangsurin for the vacant IBF Super Bantamweight title, and became the champion via a ninth round stoppage. Although he made three successful defenses of his title including points wins over future IBF Super Bantamweight champion Jose Sanabria, Lee was forced to vacate his title in 1988 when South Korea discontinued staging IBF title fights.

After beating former WBA Bantamweight champion Julian Solís in March 1988, Lee seized his last chance for the world title, challenging two-division world champion and future hall of famer Daniel Zaragoza for the WBC Super Bantamweight title in Yeosu, South Korea on May 29, 1988. The fight ended in a draw by the scores of 114-114, 114-112 (Lee) and 115-113 (Zaragoza).

In 1989, Lee hung up his boxing gloves for good and began his career as a boxing promoter.

Achievements
| Preceded by Kim Ji-won; Retired | IBF Super Bantamweight Champion; 18 January 1987 – 1988; Vacated | Succeeded by Jose Sanabria |
