= Barrington Francis =

Jamaican/Canadian boxer (born 1965)

Personal information
- Nationality: Jamaican/Canadian
- Born: 12 August 1965 (age 61) Jamaica
- Height: 5 ft 7 in (1.70 m)
- Weight: feather/super feather/lightweight

Boxing career
- Stance: Orthodox

Boxing record
- Total fights: 36
- Wins: 23 (KO 14)
- Losses: 9 (KO 3)
- Draws: 4

Barrington Francis (born 12 August 1965) is a Jamaican-Canadian professional feather/super feather/lightweight boxer who competed from 1985 to 1997. He won the Canada featherweight title, World Boxing Federation (WBF) featherweight title, Commonwealth featherweight title, his professional fighting weight varied from 124 lb (56 kg; 8 st 12 lb), i.e. Featherweight to 134 1/2 lb (61.0 kg; 9 st 8.5 lb), i.e. lightweight.

== Biography ==
Barrington Francis was born 12 August 1965 in Kingston, Jamaica. He came to Canada in 1972 at the age of 7 and as a citizen for many years turned professional at the age of 19 in Montreal, Canada. As a professional fighter in Montreal, he won Eastern Canadian and Canadian national (CPBF) titles in 1986 and 1988. He moved to Toronto in 1990 and in the process won NABC, Commonwealth and relinquished all other titles to become WBF world Champion in 1991. He was fighter of the year in 1988 for the Canadian professional boxing federation, Fighter of the year in 1992 for the WBF world title and the last Canadian official CPBF champion ever.
