= Miguel Lora =

Colombian boxer (born 1961)

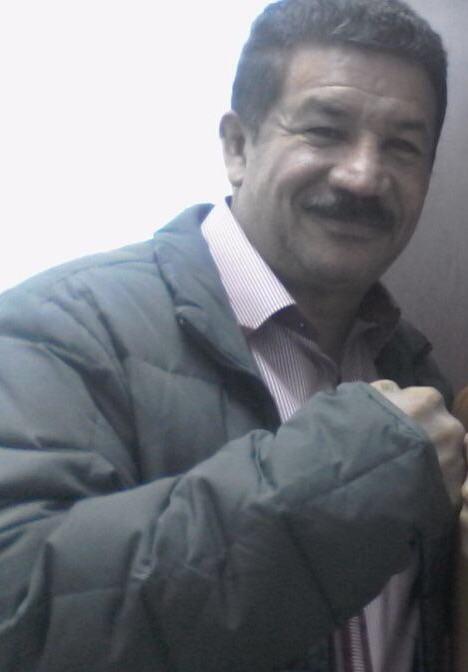
- Lora in 2015

Personal information
- Nickname: Happy
- Nationality: Colombian
- Born: Miguel Lora Escudero; April 12, 1961 (age 65) Montería, Colombia
- Height: 5 ft 6 in (168 cm)
- Weight: Super flyweight; Bantamweight

Boxing career
- Reach: 63 in (160 cm)
- Stance: Orthodox

Boxing record
- Total fights: 40
- Wins: 37
- Win by KO: 17
- Losses: 3

Miguel Lora Escudero (born April 12, 1961 in Montería, Córdoba), known as Miguel Lora or "Happy" Lora is a Colombian boxer. He reigned as the WBC bantamweight champion of the world from 1985 to 1988.

== Beginnings and world title ==
Lora started training in his native Montería and eventually represented his home department. In 1977 he won a gold medal in a local tournament. From 1980 to 1983 he won several national and regional titles. On August 9, 1985 he got his first chance to fight for the championship against Mexican Daniel Zaragoza. Lora defeated Zaragoza to become the fifth Colombian world champion.

== Memorable bouts ==
After the world title, Lora fought Puerto Rican Wilfredo Vázquez. He defended his belt eight times and fought boxers such as Alberto Davila, Antonio Avelar, Ray Minus, Lucio Omar López, until he lost against Raúl "Jíbaro" Pérez.

During the three years that Miguel "Happy" Lora kept his title, he was known for his defensive, methodical style.

== Professional boxing record ==
40 fights	37 wins	3 losses
By knockout	17	1
By decision	20	2

No.	Result	Record	Opponent	Type	Round, time	Date	Location	Notes
40	Loss	37–3	Rafael del Valle	UD	12 (12)	1993-06-19	Roberto Clemente Coliseum, San Juan, Puerto Rico	For WBO bantamweight title
39	Win	37–2	Cesar Polanco	UD	10 (10)	1993-04-23	Coliseo El Salitre, Bogotá, Colombia	
38	Win	36–2	Ricky Romero	KO	3 (10)	1992-09-26	Convention Center, Miami Beach, Florida, U.S.	
37	Win	35–2	Gabriel Bernal	PTS	10 (10)	1992-04-12	Bogotá, Colombia	
36	Win	34–2	Rolando Bohol	PTS	10 (10)	1991-08-02	Coliseo El Campin], Bogotá, Colombia	
35	Loss	33–2	Gaby Canizales	KO	2 (12)	1991-03-12	The Palace, Auburn Hills, Michigan, U.S.	For vacant WBO bantamweight title
34	Win	33–1	Bernardo Mendoza	PTS	10 (10)	1990-12-14	Montería, Colombia	
33	Win	32–1	Emilio Aponte	TKO	3 (10)	1990-08-18	Montería, Colombia	
32	Loss	31–1	Raúl Pérez	UD	12 (12)	1988-10-29	Las Vegas Hilton, Winchester, Nevada, U.S.	Lost WBC bantamweight title
31	Win	31–0	Alberto Dávila	UD	12 (12)	1988-08-01	Great Western Forum, Inglewood, California, U.S.	Retained WBC bantamweight title
30	Win	30–0	Lucio Omar Lopez	UD	12 (12)	1988-04-30	Plaza de Toros, Cartagena, Colombia	Retained WBC bantamweight title
29	Win	29–0	Ray Minus	UD	12 (12)	1987-11-27	Convention Center, Miami Beach, Florida, U.S.	Retained WBC bantamweight title
28	Win	28–0	Antonio Avelar	KO	4 (12)	1987-07-25	Marine Stadium, Key Biscayne, Florida, U.S.	Retained WBC bantamweight title
27	Win	27–0	Alberto Dávila	UD	12 (12)	1986-11-15	Estadio Metropolitano, Barranquilla, Colombia	Retained WBC bantamweight title
26	Win	26–0	Enrique Sánchez	TKO	6 (12)	1986-08-23	Convention Center, Miami Beach, Florida, U.S.	Retained WBC bantamweight title
25	Win	25–0	Wilfredo Vázquez	UD	12 (12)	1986-02-08	Convention Center, Miami Beach, Florida, U.S.	Retained WBC bantamweight title
24	Win	24–0	Daniel Zaragoza	UD	12 (12)	1985-08-09	Tamiami Fairgrounds Auditorium, Miami, Florida, U.S.	Won WBC bantamweight title
23	Win	23–0	Diego Avila	TKO	8 (10)	1985-06-07	Tamiami Fairgrounds Auditorium, Miami, Florida, U.S.	
22	Win	22–0	Ramon Antonio Nery	TKO	2 (10)	1985-05-10	Tamiami Fairgrounds Auditorium, Miami, Florida, U.S.	
21	Win	21–0	Jose Chacon	PTS	10 (10)	1984-11-24	Estadio 18 de Junio, Montería, Colombia	
20	Win	20–0	Juan Torres	PTS	10 (10)	1984-07-03	Jai Alai Fronton, Miami, Florida, U.S.	
19	Win	19–0	Edwin Rangel	PTS	10 (10)	1984-02-18	Plaza de Toros, Cartagena, Colombia	
18	Win	18–0	Juan Díaz	TKO	5 (10)	1983-12-16	Montería, Colombia	
17	Win	17–0	Pedro Romero	PTS	12 (12)	1983-09-18	Cereté, Colombia	Retained WBC Continental Americas bantamweight title
16	Win	16–0	Jose Salazar	KO	3 (?)	1983-07-30	Sincelejo, Colombia	
15	Win	15–0	Rubén Darío Palacio	PTS	12 (12)	1983-05-12	Montería, Colombia	Won vacant WBC Continental Americas bantamweight title
14	Win	14–0	Miguel Perez	PTS	12 (12)	1982-09-17	Montería, Colombia	Won Colombian super-flyweight title
13	Win	13–0	Charles Maussa	KO	7 (?)	1982-07-30	Montería, Colombia	
12	Win	12–0	Edelmiro Cassiani	KO	7 (?)	1982-02-27	Montería, Colombia	
11	Win	11–0	Luis Tapias	TKO	3 (?)	1981-12-18	Montería, Colombia	
10	Win	10–0	Carlos Osorio	PTS	10 (10)	1981-05-28	Montería, Colombia	
9	Win	9–0	Arnold Sarmiento	TKO	3 (?)	1980-12-03	Montería, Colombia	
8	Win	8–0	Juan Alvarez	PTS	10 (10)	1980-10-31	Montería, Colombia	
7	Win	7–0	Orlando Tejedor	KO	1 (10)	1980-08-14	Coliseo El Campin, Bogotá, Colombia	
6	Win	6–0	Julio Soto Solano	PTS	12 (12)	1980-06-12	Montería, Colombia	Won WBC FECARBOX super-flyweight title
5	Win	5–0	Justo Jorge	TKO	3 (?)	1980-03-28	Montería, Colombia	
4	Win	4–0	Arnold Sarmiento	KO	3 (?)	1979-12-22	Montería, Colombia	
3	Win	3–0	Tomas Maza	KO	1 (?)	1979-11-23	Coliseo de la Circunvalacion, Montería, Colombia	
2	Win	2–0	Alfredo Gomez	KO	1 (?)	1979-10-26	Coliseo de la Circunvalacion, Montería, Colombia	
1	Win	1–0	Wilfredo Ruiz	PTS	6 (6)	1979-07-27	Montería, Colombia	

== Retirement ==
After his loss to Raúl "Jíbaro" Pérez, he fought for a world title against Gaby Canizales, who won by knockout and eventually dislodged Lora's fifth cervical vertebrae. Miguel "Happy" Lora decided to retire form boxing in 1993 and since then he has been living in his native Montería, dedicated to personal business, TV shows and soap operas.

== See also ==
- List of world bantamweight boxing champions

Sporting positions
Regional boxing titles
Preceded by Julio Soto Solano	WBC FECARBOX super-flyweight champion June 12, 1980 – 1980; Vacated	Vacant Title next held by Julio Soto Solano
Preceded by Miguel Pérez	Colombian super-flyweight champion September 17, 1982 – 1983; Vacated	Vacant Title next held by Raul Ernesto Diaz
Vacant Title last held by Cardenio Ulloa	WBC Continental Americas bantamweight champion May 12, 1983 – 1984; Vacated	Vacant Title next held by Fred Jackson
World boxing titles
Preceded by Daniel Zaragoza	WBC bantamweight champion August 9, 1985 – October 29, 1988	Succeeded by Raúl Pérez
