= Park Chan-yong =

Park Chan-yong may refer to:

- Park Chan-yong (boxer) (born 1963)
- Park Chan-yong (footballer) (born 1996)
- Park Chan-yong (handballer) (born 1980)

== See also ==
- Park Chan-young (disambiguation)
