= Luis Mendoza (boxer) =

Colombian boxer

Personal information
- Nickname: Chicanero
- Born: Luis Enrique Mendoza San Onofre, Sucre, Colombia
- Weight: Bantamweight; Super bantamweight; Featherweight; Super featherweight

Boxing career
- Stance: Orthodox

Boxing record
- Total fights: 47
- Wins: 38
- Win by KO: 20
- Losses: 7
- Draws: 2

Luis Enrique Mendoza is a Colombian former professional boxer who competed between 1985 and 1998.

== Boxing career ==
=== Amateur career ===
Mendoza participated in the 1983 Pan American Games, he would lose in the first round to Dominican boxer Laureano Ramírez.

=== Professional career ===
Mendoza turned professional in 1985 & amassed a record of 26-2-2 before he challenged and beat compatriot Rubén Darío Palacio, to win the vacant WBA super bantamweight world title. Mendoza defended the title four times including against French boxer Fabrice Benichou. He would eventually lose the title to Mexico's Raúl Pérez.

== Professional boxing record ==
47 fights	38 wins	7 losses
By knockout	20	1
By decision	18	6
Draws	2	

No.	Result	Record	Opponent	Type	Round, time	Date	Location	Notes
47	Loss	38–7–2	Freddie Norwood	UD	12 (12)	1998-07-10	Miccosukee Resort & Gaming, Miami, Florida, U.S.	For WBA featherweight title
46	Win	38–6–2	Edward Barrios	PTS	10 (10)	1998-06-06	Cartagena, Colombia	
45	Loss	37–6–2	Regilio Tuur	RTD	10 (12)	1995-09-16	Sportcentrum Valkenhuizen, Arnhem, Netherlands	For WBO super featherweight title
44	Win	37–5–2	Ericel Nucamendi	MD	10 (10)	1995-07-10	Great Western Forum, Inglewood, California, U.S.	
43	Loss	36–5–2	Eloy Rojas	UD	12 (12)	1994-12-03	Coliseo El Campin, Bogota, Colombia	For WBA featherweight title
42	Win	36–4–2	Hilario Guzman	UD	10 (10)	1994-04-10	Pabellon 33 de Corferias, Bogota, Colombia	
41	Win	35–4–2	José Sanabria	UD	12 (12)	1993-11-26	Puerto La Cruz, Venezuela	Won WBA Fedelatin featherweight title
40	Loss	34–4–2	Wilfredo Vázquez	UD	12 (12)	1993-03-06	Palais des sports Marcel-Cerdan, Levallois-Perret, France	For WBA super bantamweight title
39	Win	34–3–2	Edgar Rodriguez	TKO	2 (?)	1992-11-13	Barranquilla, Colombia	
38	Win	33–3–2	Abenicio Gonzalez	TKO	4 (10)	1992-08-01	Gimnasio Nuevo Panama, Panama City, Panama	
37	Win	32–3–2	Mario Diaz	UD	10 (10)	1992-05-16	Plaza de Toros San Roque, Tuxtla Gutierrez, Mexico	
36	Loss	31–3–2	Raúl Pérez	SD	12 (12)	1991-10-07	Great Western Forum, Inglewood, California, U.S.	Lost WBA super bantamweight title
35	Win	31–2–2	Joao Cardoso	KO	7 (12)	1991-05-30	Palacio de los Deportes, Madrid, Spain	Retained WBA super bantamweight title
34	Win	30–2–2	Carlos Uribe	UD	12 (12)	1991-04-20	Plaza de Toros de Cartagena de Indias, Cartagena, Colombia	Retained WBA super bantamweight title
33	Win	29–2–2	Visan Thummong	TKO	8 (12)	1991-01-20	Panthit Plaza, Bangkok, Thailand	Retained WBA super bantamweight title
32	Win	28–2–2	Fabrice Benichou	SD	12 (12)	1990-10-18	Palais Omnisport de Paris-Bercy, Paris, France	Retained WBA super bantamweight title
31	Win	27–2–2	Rubén Darío Palacio	TKO	3 (12)	1990-09-11	Jai Alai Fronton, Miami, Florida, U.S.	Won vacant WBA super bantamweight title
30	Draw	26–2–2	Rubén Darío Palacio	SD	12 (12)	1990-05-25	Plaza de Toros de Cartagena de Indias, Cartagena, Colombia	For vacant WBA super bantamweight title
29	Draw	26–2–1	Carlos Rocha	PTS	10 (10)	1989-09-30	Coliseo Humberto Perea, Barranquilla, Colombia	
28	Loss	26–2	Juan José Estrada	UD	12 (12)	1989-07-10	Auditorio Municipal, Tijuana, Mexico	For WBA super bantamweight title
27	Win	26–1	Azael Moran	PTS	10 (10)	1989-04-15	Salon Jumbo del Country Club, Barranquilla, Colombia	
26	Win	25–1	Manuel Vilchez	PTS	10 (10)	1989-02-18	Cartagena, Colombia	
25	Win	24–1	Enrique Sanchez	TKO	6 (?)	1988-12-16	Cartagena, Colombia	
24	Win	23–1	Salatiel Palacios	KO	2 (?)	1988-09-30	Real Hotel Tennis Court, Cartagena, Colombia	
23	Win	22–1	Jaime Castellon	TKO	4 (10)	1988-09-03	Plaza de Toros de Cartagena de Indias, Cartagena, Colombia	
22	Win	21–1	Miguel Maturana	TKO	4 (?)	1988-02-26	Cartagena, Colombia	
21	Win	20–1	Enrique Sanchez	PTS	10 (10)	1987-12-18	Plaza de Toros de Cartagena de Indias, Cartagena, Colombia	
20	Win	19–1	Daniel Blanco	PTS	10 (10)	1987-09-04	Plaza de Toros de Cartagena de Indias, Cartagena, Colombia	
19	Win	18–1	Gilberto Barcenas	KO	4 (?)	1987-07-31	San Andres, Colombia	
18	Win	17–1	Moises Fuentes Rocha	PTS	10 (10)	1987-05-25	Cartagena, Colombia	Retained Colombian bantamweight title
17	Win	16–1	Eudo Bermudez	KO	3 (?)	1987-04-03	Cartagena, Colombia	
16	Win	15–1	Rafael Martinez	KO	1 (?)	1987-03-14	Cartagena, Colombia	
15	Win	14–1	Alirio Macis	KO	2 (?)	1987-02-20	Cartagena, Colombia	
14	Win	13–1	Ezequiel Hernandez	PTS	10 (10)	1986-12-21	Estadio Once de Noviembre, Cartagena, Colombia	Retained Colombian bantamweight title
13	Win	12–1	Gustavo Zabala	KO	2 (10)	1986-10-31	Monteria, Colombia	Retained Colombian bantamweight title
12	Win	11–1	Manuel Ariza	TKO	1 (10)	1986-10-03	Cartagena, Colombia	Won Colombian bantamweight title
11	Win	10–1	Albeiro Arboleda	TKO	4 (?)	1986-09-12	Cartagena, Colombia	
10	Win	9–1	Alejandro Pastrana	KO	1 (?)	1986-07-19	San Andres, Colombia	
9	Win	8–1	Manuel Salgado	PTS	6 (6)	1986-07-05	Cartagena, Colombia	
8	Win	7–1	Ezequiel Hernandez	PTS	8 (8)	1986-06-14	San Andres, Colombia	
7	Win	6–1	Tomas Maza	KO	4 (?)	1986-02-15	San Andres, Colombia	
6	Loss	5–1	Jesse Williams	PTS	6 (6)	1985-12-13	Tamiami Fairgrounds Auditorium, Miami, Florida, U.S.	
5	Win	5–0	Luis Monzote	PTS	6 (6)	1985-12-03	Tamiami Fairgrounds Auditorium, Miami, Florida, U.S.	
4	Win	4–0	Darryl Pinckney	KO	1 (4)	1985-11-15	Tamiami Fairgrounds Auditorium, Miami, Florida, U.S.	
3	Win	3–0	Valerio Zea	PTS	6 (6)	1985-04-21	Cartagena, Colombia	
2	Win	2–0	Onofre Valiente	TKO	4 (?)	1985-03-29	Barranquilla, Colombia	
1	Win	1–0	Luis Berrio	PTS	6 (6)	1985-03-01	Cartagena, Colombia	

== See also ==
- List of world super-bantamweight boxing champions

Sporting positions
World boxing titles
Vacant Title last held by Jesus Salud	WBA super bantamweight champion September 11, 1990 – October 7, 1991	Succeeded by Raúl Pérez
