= Kelvin Seabrooks =

American boxer (born 1963)

Personal information
- Born: March 10, 1963 (age 63) Charlotte, North Carolina, U.S.
- Height: 5 ft 6 in (168 cm)
- Weight: Bantamweight; Super bantamweight

Boxing career
- Reach: 65 1/2 in (166 cm)
- Stance: Orthodox

Boxing record
- Total fights: 50
- Wins: 28
- Win by KO: 23
- Losses: 22

Kelvin Seabrooks (born March 10, 1963, in Charlotte, North Carolina) is a retired American boxer who won the International Boxing Federation bantamweight title and defended it four times.

== Boxing career ==
=== Amateur career ===
Seabrooks started boxing with the local Police Athletic League at age 11. Seabrooks went to win four N.C. Golden Gloves championships. A highlight of his boxing career was winning a bronze medal at the 1980 Olympic trials; however, he didn't get to go to the Olympics. President Jimmy Carter boycotted the Summer Olympics in Moscow that year to protest the December 1979 Soviet invasion of Afghanistan.

=== Professional career ===
Seabrooks turned professional in 1981. In 1987, Seabrooks won the United States Boxing Association bantamweight championship, but gave up his title to compete in the world championship. He became the International Boxing Federation world bantamweight champion that year with a fifth-round knockout of Miguel Maturana in Cartagena, Colombia. His first title defense against Frenchman Thierry Jacob, ended in controversy as it was initially declared a draw but later ruled on as a win for Seabrooks. His next defense was more straight forward beating filipino contender Ernie Cataluna via fourth round stoppage. He would eventually lose the title to Orlando Canizales in 1988. Seabrooks retired in 1995 after six consecutive losses.

== Professional boxing record ==
50 fights	28 wins	22 losses
By knockout	23	11
By decision	5	11

No.	Result	Record	Opponent	Type	Round, time	Date	Location	Notes
50	Loss	28–22	Jimmi Bredahl	TKO	2 (8)	1995-03-17	K.B. Hallen, Copenhagen, Denmark	
49	Loss	28–21	Fontaine Cabell	TKO	7 (?)	1994-09-28	Lancaster, South Carolina, U.S.	
48	Loss	28–20	Jimmy Deoria	TKO	9 (10)	1994-04-17	Catholic Youth Center, Scranton, Pennsylvania, U.S.	
47	Loss	28–19	Pete Taliaferro	TKO	7 (10)	1992-10-03	Mississippi Coast Coliseum, Biloxi, Mississippi, U.S.	
46	Loss	28–18	Tom Johnson	RTD	7 (10)	1992-06-10	Paramount Theatre, New York, New York, U.S.	
45	Loss	28–17	Angel Mayor	UD	10 (10)	1991-12-06	Jai Alai Fronton, Miami, Florida, U.S.	
44	Win	28–16	Robert Woods	KO	5 (10)	1991-10-18	Grady Cole Center, Charlotte, North Carolina, U.S.	
43	Loss	27–16	Jesse Benavides	TKO	1 (12)	1990-05-13	Memorial Coliseum, Corpus Christi, Texas, U.S.	For USBA super bantamweight title
42	Loss	27–15	Orlando Canizales	TKO	11 (12)	1989-06-24	Harrah's Marina Hotel Casino, Atlantic City, New Jersey, U.S.	For IBF bantamweight title
41	Win	27–14	Dwayne Brooks	TKO	4 (10)	1989-04-06	True Legends Sports Bar, Charlotte, North Carolina, U.S.	
40	Loss	26–14	Orlando Canizales	TKO	15 (15)	1988-07-09	Sands Casino Hotel, Atlantic City, New Jersey, U.S.	Lost IBF bantamweight title
39	Win	26–13	Fernando Beltrán	TKO	2 (15)	1988-02-06	Stade Pierre-de-Coubertin, Paris, France	Retained IBF bantamweight title
38	Win	25–13	Ernie Cataluna	TKO	4 (15)	1987-11-18	San Cataldo, Sicilia, Italy	Retained IBF bantamweight title
37	Win	24–13	Thierry Jacob	RTD	9 (15)	1987-07-04	Calais, France	Retained IBF bantamweight title
36	Win	23–13	Miguel Maturana	KO	5 (15)	1987-05-15	Plaza de Toros de Cartagena de Indias, Cartagena, Colombia	Won vacant IBF bantamweight title
35	Win	22–13	Louis Curtis	UD	12 (12)	1987-03-01	George Washington HS Gym, Alexandria, Virginia, U.S.	Won USBA bantamweight title
34	Win	21–13	Tony Reyes	TKO	1 (10)	1986-08-15	Park Center, Charlotte, North Carolina, U.S.	
33	Win	20–13	Fred Jackson	KO	2 (10)	1986-03-10	Hordern Pavilion, Sydney, Australia	
32	Loss	19–13	Vernon Buchanan	TKO	6 (?)	1985-12-10	Harrah's Marina Hotel Casino, Atlantic City, New Jersey, U.S.	
31	Win	19–12	Rodney Bowman	TKO	3 (?)	1985-12-02	Entertainment Centre, Sydney, Australia	
30	Loss	18–12	Harold Petty	UD	12 (12)	1985-08-20	Tropicana Casino & Resort, Atlantic City, New Jersey, U.S.	For WBC Continental Americas super bantamweight title
29	Win	18–11	Frederick Reed Hall	TKO	2 (8)	1985-08-05	Sands Casino Hotel, Atlantic City, New Jersey, U.S.	
28	Loss	17–11	Tommy Cordova	UD	10 (10)	1985-05-02	Resorts Casino Hotel, Atlantic City, New Jersey, U.S.	
27	Win	17–10	Lane Killian	TKO	6 (10)	1985-03-19	Tropicana Casino & Resort, Atlantic City, New Jersey, U.S.	
26	Win	16–10	Ray Minus	TKO	3 (?)	1985-03-08	Nassau, Bahamas	
25	Loss	15–10	Calvin Grove	UD	10 (10)	1985-02-04	Sands Casino Hotel, Atlantic City, New Jersey, U.S.	
24	Loss	15–9	Patrick Cowdell	TKO	5 (10)	1984-12-05	Alexandra Pavilion, Muswell Hill, England, U.K.	
23	Win	15–8	Chester Richardson	UD	10 (10)	1984-11-14	National Guard Armory, Pikesville, Maryland, U.S.	
22	Loss	14–8	Gaby Canizales	MD	12 (12)	1984-08-25	Riverdrive Mall Parking lot, Laredo, Texas, U.S.	For USBA bantamweight title
21	Win	14–7	Lane Killian	TKO	5 (10)	1984-05-24	Maxwell House Hotel, Nashville, Tennessee, U.S.	
20	Loss	13–7	Juan Veloz	UD	10 (10)	1984-04-03	Tropicana Casino & Resort, Atlantic City, New Jersey, U.S.	
19	Loss	13–6	Myron Taylor	UD	10 (10)	1984-03-06	Tropicana Casino & Resort, Atlantic City, New Jersey, U.S.	
18	Win	13–5	David Grayton	PTS	10 (10)	1984-01-24	Tropicana Casino & Resort, Atlantic City, New Jersey, U.S.	
17	Win	12–5	Alfonso Mitchell	TKO	2 (?)	1983-12-13	Tropicana Casino & Resort, Atlantic City, New Jersey, U.S.	
16	Win	11–5	Mike Haygood	KO	2 (10)	1983-11-30	National Guard Armory, Columbia, South Carolina, U.S.	
15	Loss	10–5	Carmelo Negron	TKO	7 (10)	1983-06-21	Tropicana Casino & Resort, Atlantic City, New Jersey, U.S.	
14	Win	10–4	Wilfredo Padron	UD	10 (10)	1983-05-09	Sheraton Hotel, Charleston, South Carolina, U.S.	
13	Win	9–4	Ewart Chance	KO	3 (8)	1983-03-22	Atlantic City, New Jersey, U.S.	
12	Win	8–4	Rocky Garrett	TKO	3 (4)	1983-02-22	Sheraton Hotel, Charleston, South Carolina, U.S.	
11	Win	7–4	Terry Pizzaro	RTD	2 (6)	1983-02-15	Tropicana Casino & Resort, Atlantic City, New Jersey, U.S.	
10	Win	6–4	Gary Benton	KO	1 (?)	1982-12-16	Charlotte, North Carolina, U.S.	
9	Win	5–4	Donald Alston	KO	3 (6)	1982-10-16	Coliseum, Charlotte, North Carolina, U.S.	
8	Win	4–4	Terry Pizzaro	UD	8 (8)	1982-08-20	Orlando Sports Stadium, Orlando, Florida, U.S.	
7	Loss	3–4	Kenny Mitchell	MD	10 (10)	1982-07-17	Ballys Park Place Hotel Casino, Atlantic City, New Jersey, U.S.	
6	Loss	3–3	Jerome Coffee	UD	8 (8)	1982-06-15	Hyatt Regency Hotel, Nashville, Tennessee, U.S.	
5	Win	3–2	Mike Jeter	KO	1 (?)	1982-05-13	Anderson Recreation Center, Anderson, South Carolina, U.S.	
4	Loss	2–2	Francis Childs	PTS	4 (4)	1982-03-09	Brandywine Club, Chadds Ford, Pennsylvania, U.S.	
3	Loss	2–1	Vincent Christian	UD	4 (4)	1982-01-14	Sands Casino Hotel, Atlantic City, New Jersey, U.S.	
2	Win	2–0	Rondell Stevenson	TKO	2 (4)	1981-12-08	Sheraton Hotel, Charleston, South Carolina, U.S.	
1	Win	1–0	Peanut Hughes	KO	1 (4)	1981-10-09	Park Center, Charlotte, North Carolina, U.S.	

== Later life ==
Seabrooks retired from boxing in 1995 and was inducted into the Carolinas Boxing Hall of Fame in 2003. He later worked as a security guard at Charlotte-Mecklenburg Schools, before his retirement from the CMS in 2025, and trains boxers. He also gives motivational speeches to students. Seabrooks is also in the process of establishing a nonprofit organization called Kelvin Seabrooks Sports & Education Center, Inc., to provide mentorship, tutoring and recreational programs to help kids succeed. The center's mission will be to provide a safe haven in the community for youth to enhance their abilities and skills, leading them on the right track toward the future, said Seabrooks. Seabrooks lives with his wife in east Charlotte.

== See also ==
- List of world bantamweight boxing champions

Sporting positions
World boxing titles
Vacant Title last held by Jeff Fenech	IBF bantamweight champion May 15, 1987 – July 9, 1988	Succeeded by Orlando Canizales
Awards
Previous: Samart Payakaroon	The Ring Progress of the Year; 1987	Next: Michael Nunn
