= Antonio Esparragoza =

Venezuelan boxer (born 1959)

Personal information
- Born: 2 September 1959 Cumaná, Venezuela
- Height: 1.70 m (5 ft 7 in)
- Weight: Featherweight

Boxing career
- Stance: Orthodox

Boxing record
- Total fights: 36
- Wins: 30
- Win by KO: 27
- Losses: 2
- Draws: 4

Antonio Esparragoza Betancourt (born 2 September 1959) is a Venezuelan former boxer who is a former WBA Featherweight Champion of the World.

== Amateur career ==
Esparragoza represented Venezuela as a Featherweight at the 1980 Moscow Olympic Games. Below are the results from that tournament:

- Round of 64: bye
- Round of 32: lost to Peter Hanlon (Great Britain) by decision, 1-4

== Professional career ==
Esparragoza turned pro in 1981 and after largely fighting unproven fighters in his native Venezuela was granted a shot at Lineal & WBA Featherweight Titles holder Steve Cruz in 1987. Esparragoza pulled off an upset with a TKO in the 12th round. Esparragoza defended the titles against seven contenders before losing the belts to Yong-Kyun Park in 1991 via unanimous decision. He retired after the loss.

Due to his incredible knockout power, Esparragoza is ranked at 75 in Ring Magazine's list of 100 Greatest Punchers.

== Professional boxing record ==
36 fights	30 wins	2 losses
By knockout	27	1
By decision	3	1
Draws	4	

No.	Result	Record	Opponent	Type	Round, time	Date	Location	Notes
36	Loss	30–2–4	Park Yong-kyun	UD	12	Mar 30, 1991	Mudeungsan Hotel, Gwangju City, South Korea	Lost WBA featherweight title
35	Win	30–1–4	Chan Mok Park	UD	12	May 12, 1990	Hilton Hotel, Seoul, South Korea	Retained WBA featherweight title
34	Win	29–1–4	Eduardo Montoya	KO	5 (12), 1:30	Sep 22, 1989	Plaza de Toros Calafia, Mexicali, Mexico	Retained WBA and The Ring featherweight titles
33	Win	28–1–4	Jean Marc Renard	KO	6 (12), 2:25	Jun 2, 1989	Palais des Expositions, Namur, Belgium	Retained WBA and The Ring featherweight titles
32	Win	27–1–4	Mitsuru Sugiya	KO	10 (12), 2:07	Mar 26, 1989	Municipal Gymnasium, Kawasaki, Japan	Retained WBA and The Ring featherweight titles
31	Win	26–1–4	Jose Marmolejo	KO	8 (12), 1:26	Nov 5, 1988	Palazzo Dello Sport, Marsala, Italy	Retained WBA and The Ring featherweight titles
30	Draw	25–1–4	Marcos Villasana	SD	12	Jun 23, 1988	Sports Arena, Los Angeles, California, US	Retained WBA and The Ring featherweight titles
29	Win	25–1–3	Pascual Aranda	KO	10 (12), 2:48	Jul 26, 1987	Las Americas Arena, Houston, Texas, US	Retained WBA and The Ring featherweight titles
28	Win	24–1–3	Steve Cruz	TKO	12 (12), 2:48	Mar 6, 1987	Will Rogers Coliseum, Fort Worth, Texas, US	Won WBA and The Ring featherweight titles
27	Win	23–1–3	Octavio Quinones	RTD	3 (10), 1:52	Jan 16, 1987	Veteran's Memorial Coliseum, Phoenix, Arizona, US	
26	Draw	22–1–3	Nelson Rodriguez	PTS	10	May 19, 1986	San Juan, Puerto Rico	
25	Win	22–1–2	Bernardo Checa	KO	2 (10)	Mar 22, 1986	Turmero, Venezuela	
24	Win	21–1–2	Jose M. Ortiz	KO	2 (?)	Feb 17, 1986	Turmero, Venezuela	
23	Win	20–1–2	Johnny De La Rosa	TKO	3 (10)	May 4, 1985	Concorde Boxing Arena, Oranjestad, Aruba	
22	Win	19–1–2	Joe Rivera	KO	2 (?)	Feb 23, 1985	Santo Domingo, Dominican Republic	
21	Win	18–1–2	Jeff Roberts	KO	7 (?)	Feb 2, 1985	Coliseo Roberto Clemente, San Juan, Puerto Rico	
20	Draw	17–1–2	Bernardo Checa	PTS	10	Oct 10, 1984	Porlamar, Venezuela	
19	Win	17–1–1	Jose Guerrero	UD	10	Aug 11, 1984	Concorde Boxing Arena, Oranjestad, Aruba	
18	Win	16–1–1	Eduardo Laguna	KO	4 (?)	Jul 7, 1984	Maracaibo, Venezuela	
17	Win	15–1–1	Jose de Jesus Acosta	TKO	3 (?)	May 15, 1984	Elias Mansur Stadion, Oranjestad, Aruba	
16	Win	14–1–1	Ruben Veliz	KO	3 (?)	Dec 16, 1983	Ciudad Bolivar, Venezuela	
15	Win	13–1–1	Fabio Mosquera	KO	3 (?)	Oct 1, 1983	Caracas, Venezuela	
14	Win	12–1–1	Alberto Parra	KO	3 (?)	May 13, 1983	Porlamar, Venezuela	
13	Win	11–1–1	Jose Mosqueda	KO	7 (?)	Mar 26, 1983	Catia La Mar, Venezuela	
12	Win	10–1–1	Antonio Rodriguez	KO	3 (?)	Feb 19, 1983	Cumana, Venezuela	
11	Win	9–1–1	Freddy Pitalua	PTS	10	Nov 6, 1982	Caracas, Venezuela	
10	Draw	8–1–1	Bernardo Piñango	PTS	10	Oct 4, 1982	Caracas, Venezuela	
9	Win	8–1	Angel Torres	KO	9 (?)	Jul 26, 1982	Cumana, Venezuela	
8	Win	7–1	Tito Roque	KO	2 (?)	Jun 21, 1982	Cumana, Venezuela	
7	Win	6–1	Alejandro Garcia	KO	2 (?)	May 24, 1982	Cumana, Venezuela	
6	Win	5–1	Francisco Leta	KO	5 (?)	May 10, 1982	Cumana, Venezuela	
5	Loss	4–1	Angel Torres	KO	6 (?)	Feb 1, 1982	Caracas, Venezuela	
4	Win	4–0	David Siso	KO	3 (?)	Jan 25, 1982	Barquisimeto, Venezuela	
3	Win	3–0	Luis Solorzano	KO	2 (?)	Oct 31, 1981	Maracay, Venezuela	
2	Win	2–0	Ramon Bolivar	KO	2 (?)	Oct 1, 1981	Maracay, Venezuela	
1	Win	1–0	Anthony Wanza	KO	2 (?)	Feb 24, 1981	Cumana, Venezuela	

== See also ==
- Lineal championship
- List of featherweight boxing champions

Sporting positions
World boxing titles
Preceded by Steve Cruz	WBA Featherweight Champion; 6 March 1987 – 30 March 1991	Succeeded by Park Yong-kyun
Preceded by Steve Cruz	The Ring featherweight champion 6 March 1987 – December 1989; Title discontinued until 2002	Vacant Title next held by Marco Antonio Barrera
Preceded by Steve Cruz	Lineal featherweight champion 6 March 1987 – 30 March 1991	Succeeded by Park Yong-kyun
