= Gaby Canizales =

American boxer

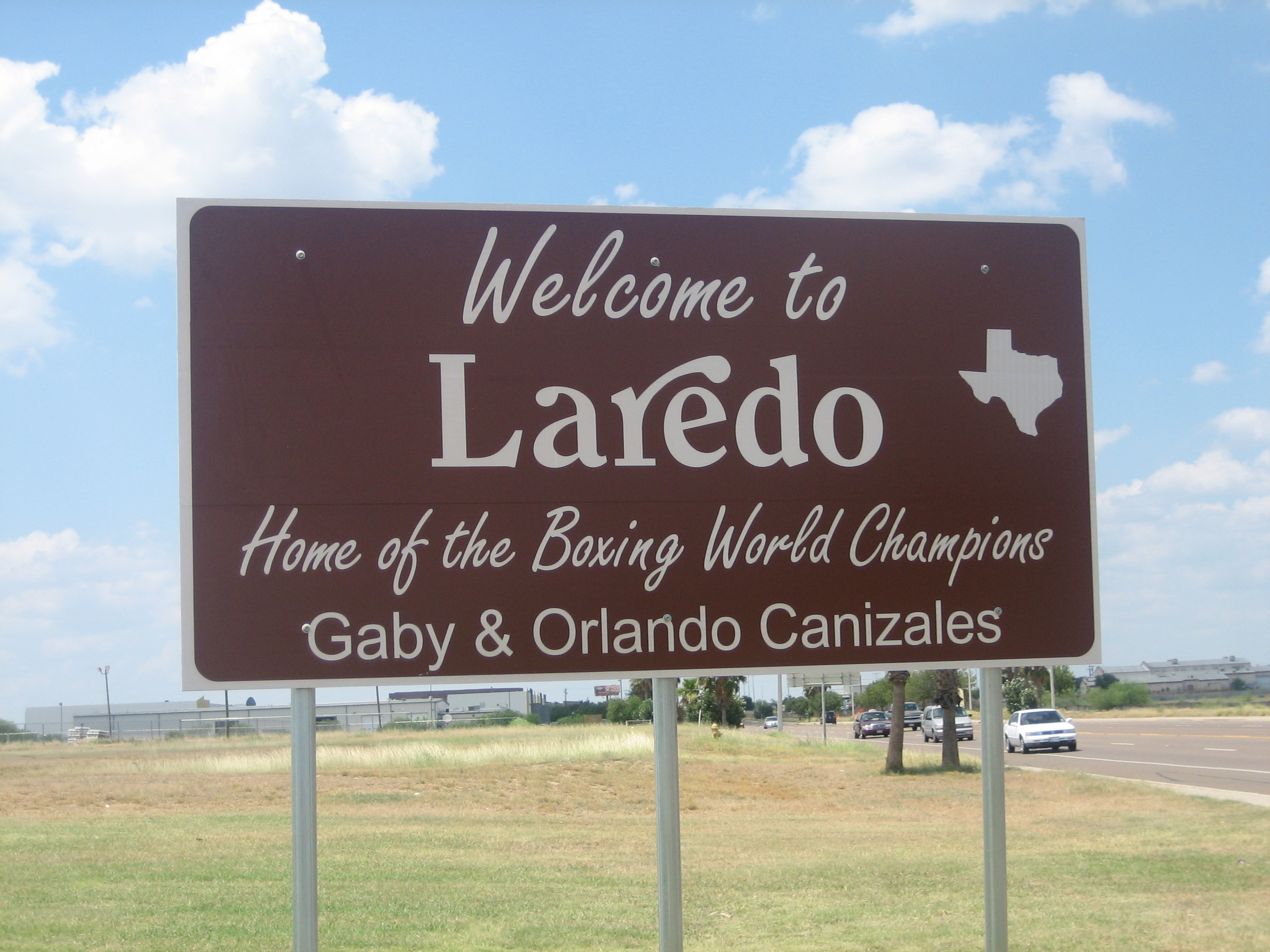
- Orlando and Gaby Canizales are honored on welcome sign in their hometown of Laredo, Texas

Personal information
- Nationality: American
- Born: Jose Canizales; May 1, 1960 (age 66) Laredo, Webb County, Texas
- Height: 5 ft 4 in (1.63 m)
- Weight: Bantamweight

Boxing career
- Reach: 65 in (165 cm)
- Stance: Orthodox

Boxing record
- Total fights: 57
- Wins: 48
- Win by KO: 36
- Losses: 8
- Draws: 1

Jose 'Gaby' Canizales (born May 1, 1960) is an American former professional boxer who won the Lineal championship in the bantamweight division.

== Early life ==
Canizales was born in Laredo in Webb County, Texas.

== Pro career ==
Canizales turned pro in 1979 and in 1983 challenged Jeff Chandler for the World Boxing Association (WBA) bantamweight title but lost a decision. In 1986 he landed a shot at Richie Sandoval for the Lineal and WBA bantamweight title. Canizales dominated, and knocked Sandoval down once in the 1st, once in the 5º, and three times in the 7th round, winning via a 7th-round knockout. He lost the belt in his first defense to Bernardo Pinango via decision. In 1990, he challenged Raúl Pérez for the World Boxing Council bantamweight title but lost a decision. In 1991, he fought Miguel Lora for the vacant World Boxing Organization bantamweight title and won via 2nd-round knockout, after being dropped in round one by the Colombian. He lost the belt in his first defense to Duke McKenzie via decision, and retired after the loss.

He is the brother of former bantamweight champion Orlando Canizales. Both brothers obtained the title of world boxing champion at the same age and weight.

The Orlando & Gaby Canizales Boxing Gym and Community Center on Guadalupe Street in Laredo is named in honor of the brothers. The facility was expanded in 2014.

== Professional boxing record ==
57 fights	48 wins	8 losses
By knockout	36	1
By decision	12	7
Draws	1	

No.	Result	Record	Opponent	Type	Round	Date	Age	Location	Notes
57	Loss	48–8–1	Duke McKenzie	UD	12	Jun 30, 1991	31 years, 60 days	Elephant & Castle Centre, Southwark, London, England, U.K.	Lost WBO bantamweight title
56	Win	48–7–1	Miguel Lora	KO	2 (12)	Mar 12, 1991	30 years, 315 days	The Palace, Auburn Hills, Michigan, U.S.	Won vacant WBO bantamweight title
55	Win	47–7–1	Felipe Torres	TKO	10 (10)	Nov 14, 1990	30 years, 197 days	Celebrity Theater, Phoenix, Arizona, U.S.	
54	Win	46–7–1	Jose Luis Soto	KO	8 (10)	Sep 7, 1990	30 years, 129 days	Municipal Auditorium, Kansas City, Missouri, U.S.	
53	Draw	45–7–1	Francisco Valdez	PTS	10	Jul 16, 1990	30 years, 76 days	Celebrity Theater, Phoenix, Arizona, U.S.	
52	Loss	45–7	Raúl Pérez	UD	12	Jan 22, 1990	29 years, 266 days	Great Western Forum, Inglewood, California, U.S.	For WBC bantamweight title
51	Win	45–6	Eduardo Lopez	TKO	5 (10)	Dec 9, 1989	29 years, 222 days	Lawlor Events Center, Reno, Nevada, U.S.	
50	Loss	44–6	Greg Richardson	UD	10	Jul 17, 1989	29 years, 77 days	Trump Plaza Hotel, Atlantic City, New Jersey, U.S.	
49	Win	44–5	Carlos Castro	KO	1 (?)	Apr 22, 1989	28 years, 356 days	The Palace, Auburn Hills, Michigan, U.S.	
48	Win	43–5	Carlos Castro	TKO	3 (12)	Dec 15, 1988	28 years, 228 days	Convention Center, Tucson, Arizona, U.S.	Won vacant USA Arizona State bantamweight title
47	Win	42–5	Alejandro Valenzuela	SD	10	Oct 17, 1988	28 years, 169 days	Convention Center, Tucson, Arizona, U.S.	
46	Win	41–5	Lucilo Nolasco	MD	10	Jul 21, 1988	28 years, 81 days	Holiday Inn Holidome, Tucson, Arizona, U.S.	
45	Win	40–5	Julio Blanco	KO	7 (10)	Jun 3, 1988	28 years, 33 days	Holiday Inn Holidome, Tucson, Arizona, U.S.	
44	Loss	39–5	Kenny Mitchell	SD	12	Mar 25, 1988	27 years, 329 days	Houston, Texas, U.S.	Lost USBA bantamweight title
43	Win	39–4	Louis Curtis	MD	12	Nov 27, 1987	27 years, 210 days	Resorts International, Atlantic City, New Jersey, U.S.	Won vacant USBA bantamweight title
42	Win	38–4	Alejandro Valenzuela	KO	3 (10)	Sep 18, 1987	27 years, 140 days	Ramada Inn East, Phoenix, Arizona, U.S.	
41	Loss	37–4	Raúl Pérez	TKO	9 (?)	Jul 6, 1987	27 years, 66 days	Tijuana, Baja California, Mexico	
40	Win	37–3	Julio Blanco	UD	10	May 5, 1987	27 years, 4 days	Fiesta Plaza Mall, San Antonio, Texas, U.S.	
39	Win	36–3	Mike Moreno	TKO	3 (10)	Mar 31, 1987	26 years, 334 days	Community Center, Tucson, Arizona, U.S.	
38	Win	35–3	Mauro Diaz	UD	10	Jan 30, 1987	26 years, 274 days	Fiesta Plaza Mall, San Antonio, Texas, U.S.	
37	Win	34–3	Armando Morales Terron	KO	2 (10)	Dec 11, 1986	26 years, 224 days	Marriot Brookhollow, Houston, Texas, U.S.	
36	Loss	33–3	Bernardo Piñango	UD	15	Jun 4, 1986	26 years, 34 days	Meadowlands Arena, East Rutherford, New Jersey, U.S.	Lost WBA and The Ring bantamweight titles
35	Win	33–2	Richie Sandoval	TKO	7 (15)	Mar 10, 1986	25 years, 313 days	Caesars Palace, Outdoor Arena, Las Vegas, Nevada, U.S.	Won WBA and The Ring bantamweight titles
34	Win	32–2	Troy Townsend	TKO	10 (10)	May 22, 1985	25 years, 21 days	Harrah's Marina Hotel Casino, Atlantic City, New Jersey, U.S.	
33	Win	31–2	Jeff Whaley	UD	10	Jan 30, 1985	24 years, 274 days	Harrah's Marina Hotel Casino, Atlantic City, New Jersey, U.S.	
32	Win	30–2	Kelvin Seabrooks	MD	12	Aug 25, 1984	24 years, 116 days	Riverdrive Mall Parking lot, Laredo, Texas, U.S.	Retained USBA bantamweight title
31	Win	29–2	Javier Diaz	TKO	2 (10)	Jun 6, 1984	24 years, 36 days	Freeman Coliseum, San Antonio, Texas, U.S.	
30	Win	28–2	Pedro Rodriguez	TKO	3 (?)	Feb 7, 1984	23 years, 282 days	Astro Arena, Houston, Texas, U.S.	
29	Win	27–2	James Pipps	TKO	6 (12)	Nov 12, 1983	23 years, 195 days	Civic Center, Beaumont, Texas, U.S.	Retained USBA bantamweight title
28	Win	26–2	Norberto Castellano	TKO	1 (10)	Oct 19, 1983	23 years, 171 days	Civic Center Arena, Laredo, Texas, U.S.	
27	Win	25–2	Ron Cisneros	TKO	10 (12)	May 13, 1983	23 years, 12 days	The Corral, Laredo, Texas, U.S.	Retained USBA bantamweight title
26	Loss	24–2	Jeff Chandler	UD	15	Mar 13, 1983	22 years, 316 days	Resorts International, Atlantic City, New Jersey, U.S.	For WBA and The Ring bantamweight titles
25	Win	24–1	Gustavo Martinez	KO	3 (10)	Nov 23, 1982	22 years, 206 days	Civic Center Arena, Laredo, Texas, U.S.	
24	Win	23–1	Jose Luis Soto	TKO	2 (10)	Oct 19, 1982	22 years, 171 days	Civic Center Arena, Laredo, Texas, U.S.	
23	Win	22–1	Franco Torregoza	TKO	10 (12)	Sep 22, 1982	22 years, 144 days	Resorts International, Atlantic City, New Jersey, U.S.	Retained USBA bantamweight title
22	Win	21–1	Jose Torres	UD	10	Aug 1, 1982	22 years, 92 days	Freeman Coliseum, San Antonio, Texas, U.S.	
21	Win	20–1	Diego Rosario	TKO	5 (12)	Jun 24, 1982	22 years, 54 days	Resorts International, Atlantic City, New Jersey, U.S.	Won USBA bantamweight title
20	Win	19–1	Ricardo Varela	UD	10	May 16, 1982	22 years, 15 days	Freeman Coliseum, San Antonio, Texas, U.S.	
19	Win	18–1	Ramon Guillen	KO	5 (?)	Apr 22, 1982	21 years, 356 days	Civic Center Arena, Laredo, Texas, U.S.	
18	Win	17–1	Juan Castellanos	PTS	12	Mar 10, 1982	21 years, 313 days	Laredo, Texas, U.S.	
17	Win	16–1	Eduardo Bonilla	KO	2 (10)	Feb 9, 1982	21 years, 284 days	Civic Center Arena, Laredo, Texas, U.S.	
16	Win	15–1	Mario Nava	PTS	10	Dec 2, 1981	21 years, 215 days	Laredo, Texas, U.S.	
15	Win	14–1	Mario Gomez	KO	10 (10)	Oct 31, 1981	21 years, 183 days	Laredo, Texas, U.S.	
14	Win	13–1	Franco Bejines	KO	2 (?)	Sep 1, 1981	21 years, 123 days	Civic Center Arena, Laredo, Texas, U.S.	
13	Win	12–1	Jorge Cruz	KO	1 (?)	Jul 27, 1981	21 years, 87 days	Laredo, Texas, U.S.	
12	Win	11–1	Elias DeLeon	KO	2 (?)	Jun 15, 1981	21 years, 45 days	Laredo, Texas, U.S.	
11	Win	10–1	Calvin Sheppard	PTS	10	May 14, 1981	21 years, 13 days	Dallas, Texas, U.S.	
10	Loss	9–1	Mario Nava	PTS	10	May 7, 1981	21 years, 6 days	Laredo, Texas, U.S.	
9	Win	9–0	Cecilio Ostos	KO	1 (?)	Mar 10, 1981	20 years, 313 days	Civic Center Arena, Laredo, Texas, U.S.	
8	Win	8–0	Miguel Medina	KO	6 (8)	Dec 5, 1980	20 years, 218 days	Memorial Coliseum, Corpus Christi, Texas, U.S.	
7	Win	7–0	Guillermo Velasquez	KO	1 (6)	Oct 14, 1980	20 years, 166 days	Civic Center Arena, Laredo, Texas, U.S.	
6	Win	6–0	Oscar Gomez	TKO	6 (6)	Sep 13, 1980	20 years, 135 days	Freeman Coliseum, San Antonio, Texas, U.S.	
5	Win	5–0	Miguel Angel Meza	KO	2 (?)	Sep 2, 1980	20 years, 124 days	Laredo, Texas, U.S.	
4	Win	4–0	Jose Salas	KO	2 (?)	Jul 15, 1980	20 years, 75 days	Laredo, Texas, U.S.	
3	Win	3–0	Polin Flores	KO	1 (?)	Jun 6, 1980	20 years, 36 days	Nuevo Laredo, Tamaulipas, Mexico	
2	Win	2–0	Jose Perez	KO	1 (?)	Jun 30, 1979	19 years, 60 days	Monclova, Coahuila de Zaragoza, Mexico	
1	Win	1–0	Juanin Bernal	KO	1 (?)	May 7, 1979	19 years, 6 days	Monclova, Coahuila de Zaragoza, Mexico	

== See also ==
- List of bantamweight boxing champions
- List of WBA world champions
- List of WBO world champions

Achievements
Preceded by Richie Sandoval	WBA bantamweight champion March 10, 1986 - June 4, 1986	Succeeded by Bernardo Pinango
Preceded by Richie Sandoval	The Ring bantamweight champion March 10, 1986 - June 4, 1986	Succeeded by Bernardo Pinango
Preceded by Richie Sandoval	Lineal Bantamweight Champion; March 10, 1986 - June 4, 1986	Succeeded by Bernardo Pinango
Vacant Title last held by Israel Contreras	WBO bantamweight champion March 12, 1991 - June 30, 1991	Succeeded by Duke McKenzie
