= Wilfredo Vázquez =

Puerto Rican boxer (born 1960)

Personal information
- Nicknames: Wil; El Orgullo de Puerto Rico ("The Pride of Puerto Rico")
- Born: Wilfredo Vázquez Olivera; August 2, 1960 (age 66) Bayamón, Puerto Rico
- Height: 5 ft 5 in (165 cm)
- Weight: Bantamweight; Super bantamweight; Featherweight; Lightweight

Boxing career
- Reach: 63 in (160 cm)
- Stance: Orthodox

Boxing record
- Total fights: 68
- Wins: 56
- Win by KO: 41
- Losses: 9
- Draws: 2
- No contests: 1

Wilfredo Vázquez Olivera (born August 2, 1960) is a Puerto Rican former professional boxer who competed from 1981 to 2002. He held world championships in three weight classes, including the World Boxing Association (WBA) bantamweight title from 1987 to 1988, the WBA super bantamweight title from 1992 to 1995, and the WBA featherweight title from 1996 to 1998. His son, Wilfredo Vázquez Jr., is also a former boxer and world champion.

== Early life and amateur career ==
Vázquez was born in Río Piedras, one of the largest districts of San Juan, but he was raised in Bayamón. Unlike most Puerto Rican boxers, he began practicing the basics of boxing when he was 18 years old. Vázquez began training in November 1978, two weeks after the death of his father, Juan Vázquez. His decision was directly influenced by his father's desire of having a son that practiced boxing. Juan Vázquez was a follower of Wilfredo Gómez and died shortly after purchasing tickets for Gomez's fight against Carlos Zarate. This affected Vázquez, who decided to mimic Gómez and win a professional world championship, drawing motivation from his accomplishments. He began training at Ruiz Soler gym, where he met several boxers that he regarded as "world class" material, but all of them failed to reach success after following other paths. As an amateur, Vázquez fought 17 times, losing three contests. He didn't pursue a spot in Puerto Rico's national boxing team, considering that at his age it would be hard to earn a spot, while being expecting to earn money quickly as a professional. Vázquez married Alice Lozada, with whom he has three sons, Wilfredo, Jr., Noel and Israel.

== Professional career ==
Vázquez debuted as a professional on January 29, 1981, training under the guidance of Manny Siaca. In this contest, he lost to William Ramos by unanimous decision in a four-round fight. After this fight, he won his first victory in his second fight, defeating Felix Cortez by knockout in two rounds. This was followed by a second knockout against Roberto Mercedes, who debuted against Vázquez. On April 30, 1981, he scored the first draw of his career, in a six-round fight against Eusebio Espinal. Vázquez's first contest outside of Puerto Rico was against Reinaldo Roque, whom he defeated by knockout in Miami, Florida. In his next match, he won the first decision of his career scoring a points victory over Herminio Adorno. Vázquez was scheduled to participate in Don King's Carnival of Champions card, where Gómez and Wilfred Benítez competed, but an injury suffered during training left him out of the event. In the last fight of this year, he defeated Pedro Alindato by knockout. On March 3, 1982, Vázquez beat Orlando Perez by points. He would fight eight more times during this year, all of them in New York City or Las Vegas. In these fights, Vázquez defeated Ion Trian, Jose Luis Martinez, Sonny Long and Rudy Perez twice. In 1983, he fought five times, winning every contest by knockout. His opponents during this time frame were: Euginio Paulino, Andres Torres, Robert Mullins, Ramón Cruz and Pedro Rodriguez. On March 17, 1984, Vázquez defeated Juan "Chiqui" Torres by knockout in the fourth round to win the vacant Puerto Rican bantamweight title. In his next fight, Vázquez received the first no contest of his career against Julio Guerrero. He closed the year defeating Javier Barajas and Norgie Castro. In 1985, Vázquez had a slow year, only fighting twice. His only contests were against Jeff Whaley and Osvaldo Acevedo, both of whom he defeated by technical knockout.

=== First title shot ===
On February 8, 1986, Vázquez received his first opportunity for a world championship against Miguel "Happy" Lora, who held the World Boxing Council's bantamweight championship. Vázquez received a knockdown the second round, before scoring one in the fourth round. After twelve rounds, the judges awarded Lora a unanimous decision. His next fight was against José "Pambelito" Cervantes, who had fought for the WBC's super bantamweight championship five years earlier. Vázquez won this contest by knockout in the third round. After losing to Antonio Avelar by eighth round knockout, he concluded the year defeating Jesus Muñiz. On March 14, 1987, Vázquez defeated Juan Carazo by technical knockout in the first round. Less than a month later, he defeated Lee Cargle in five rounds.

=== WBA bantamweight champion ===
On October 4, 1987, Vázquez earned a second titular opportunity, receiving a fight against Chan-yong Park in South Korea. He won the fight by knockout in the tenth round to become the World Boxing Association's champion. Vázquez's first defense was versus Takuya Muguruma in a card organized in Osaka. The fight was declared a draw, with one of the judges scored it 116-114 in favor of Muguruma, one 117-112 in favor of Vázquez, while the third considered it a 115-115 tie. Subsequently, he defended against Kaokor Galaxy in Thailand, losing by split decision. The scores were 112-115 and 113-115 in favor of Galaxy and 114-113 in favor of Vázquez. Three months later, he returned to action against Raúl Pérez, but lost by unanimous decision in 10 rounds. Following this defeat, Vázquez signed a contract with Felix "Tutico" Zabala who managed to secure a regional title fight against Fernie Morales. The contest was for the International Boxing Federation's Inter-Continental bantamweight championship, in twelve rounds, Vázquez earned a points victory. This was followed by a knockout victory in preparatory fight against Patrick Kamy, which was part of a card organized in Spain. On June 19, 1990, Vázquez fought against Israel Contreras, who won by knockout, earning what was regarded as an unexpected victory. After recovering from this loss, he defeated Joe Orewa to win the International Boxing Council's super bantamweight title on September 10, 1990. Vázquez closed the year with a technical knockout victory over Atenor Solar. On April 8, 1991, he defeated Paquito Openo by knockout in seven rounds.

=== WBA super bantamweight champion ===
This win earned Vázquez an opportunity for the WBA's super bantamweight championship. The fight was a rematch against Raúl Pérez and it took place on March 27, 1992. After scoring a knockdown in the second round, Vázquez defeated Pérez by technical knockout in the third, when the fight was interrupted seconds after a second knockdown. After defeating Juan Batista Bisono in a preparatory fight, Vázquez began a series of successful defenses. The first of these was a majority decision over Freddy Cruz in Italy. This was followed by victories over Thierry Jacob, Luis Enrique Mendoza, Thierry Jacob, a controversial points win against Juan Polo Perez in France, Hiroaki Yokota and Yūichi Kasai in Japan and Jae-Won Choi and Orlando Canizales in the United States. Due to his tendency of competing in title fights outside of Puerto Rico, Vázquez became known as El Viajero, Spanish for "the traveler". His fight against Canizales was recognized by Home Box Office as the best in the division. On May 13, 1995, he competed in his first defense in Bayamón, losing the fight against Antonio Cermeño by points. In his first fight since this loss, Vázquez scored a solid victory over Pablo "Mulato" Valenzuela. After this fight, he returned to action in Ponce, defeating Carlos Rocha by knockout in the first round. His last fight of the year was against Jose Luis Velazquez whom he defeated by technical knockout to win the vacant WBA Fedelatin featherweight championship.

=== WBA and lineal featherweight champion ===
On May 18, 1996, Vázquez fought Eloy Rojas for the lineal & WBA featherweight championships in Las Vegas. Rojas held the championships and entered the fight with a record of 33-1, which made him a favorite to retain the titles. Until the eleventh round, Rojas had a lead in all of the judges' scorecards, with scores of 98-92, 92-100 and 94-96. During the break between rounds, his corner told Vázquez that he was losing, surprising him since he considered that the fight was close to the point of being tied. Realizing this fact, he pressured the offensive, scoring two knockdowns which prompted the referee to stop the fight as a technical knockout. On December 7, 1996, Vázquez made his first defense of the titles against Bernardo Mendoza. He dominated the first four rounds by boxing, limiting his offense while Mendoza presented a timid offensive. During the final minute of the fifth round, Vázquez noticed an opening in Mendoza's defense and landed a combination that scored a knockdown. Mendoza was able to stand before the conclusion of the protection count, but his corner submitted following a second knockdown. On August 23, 1997, Vázquez defended against Roque Cassiani. Throughout the fight, Cassini moved his head from side to side, which resulted in multiple head butts. Due to this, Vázquez pursued the offensive but retained a cautious approach. In the tenth round, he slipped and fell to the floor as Cassini threw a punch, which was scored as a knockdown. Vázquez was eventually declared the winner by unanimous decision, with scores 118-110, 116-112 and 116-110. On November 8, 1997, he defeated Genaro Ríos to retain for the third time. In March 1998, the WBA stripped the championship from Vázquez, citing that he failed to meet the organisation's regulation by not signing a contract against their first contender, Antonio Cermeño, within the established time. He openly expressed anger over the issue, citing that a contract was solicited but not signed due to managerial differences with Don King.

==== Vázquez vs. Hamed ====
This was followed by a contest against the World Boxing Organization's champion, Naseem Hamed. The fight took place on April 18, 1998, being held in Manchester. Hamed used his speed to control the offensive, scoring four knockdowns. In the seventh round, the referee stopped the contest following a second consecutive knockdown. Vázquez's best round was the fifth, where he outscored Hamed, landing 26 punches against 4. Vázquez would lose his lineal championship to Hamed. This was the most lucrative fight of his career, when he received $600,000 as payment. This fight caused tension within his family, who were being informed by telephone of the results. From this point onwards, Vázquez began fighting sporadically.

=== Later career ===
In 2000, he returned after a year on inactivity, defeating Antonio Oscar Salas and Russell Mosley before losing to Juan Lazcano in a contest for the vacant NABF lightweight championship. On December 13, 200, he announced his retirement, but returned to action on February 22, 2002, defeating José Alfonso Rodríguez. Vázquez closed his career that year after defeating Julio César Cardona and Eddie Saenz twice, including his last fight that was held in Bayamón.

== Retirement and legacy ==
Following his first retirement, Vázquez followed a practice done also by other pugilists, such as Juan Laporte, Félix Trinidad, Julio César Chávez, Bobby Czyz, Sean O'Grady, Sugar Ray Leonard, Santos Laciar, Lennox Lewis, Roy Jones Jr. and Héctor Camacho among others, deciding to become a boxing commentator. Since he was sure that this retirement was definitive, the pugilist joined Univision and began narrating fights along the network's other sportscasters. Following his second retirement, Vázquez began working as a boxing trainer. Under this office, he has most notably trained his two sons, Wilfredo and Israel. Vázquez, Jr. debuted as a professional on December 8, 2006, being managed by Rubén Zavala and his promotion All Star Boxing. Vázquez has expressed that he didn't want his son to become a boxer, expecting him to study and develop a profession within the fields of law, but he accepted to train him after noticing real interest, despite knowing that he lacked any amateur experience. Subsequently, he noted his interest to be one half of the first father and son duo to win world championships in Puerto Rico. On September 12, 2008, Vázquez, Jr. won his first professional championship, the WBO Latino super bantamweight title, before incorporating the WBA Fedecentro super bantamweight title to his résumé two months later. On February 27, 2010, Vázquez, Jr. won the WBO's super bantamweight world championship joining his father as the third father-and-son combination to win world championships. They also became the first to do so in the same division. Israel Vázquez debuted on his brother's second defense, competing in the light flyweight division.

Outside of the championships won as an active boxer, Vázquez also received other recognitions due to his work. In 1996, he received the Frank Parilla Award from the Puerto Rico Boxing Commission, which is awarded to the boxer that is universally regarded as the best Puerto Rican Boxer of the year. He won this recognition after he made history by becoming the first boxer to win three separate titles within the same organisation, in this case the World Boxing Association. That same year, the WBA gave him the award for "Best Latin American Boxer of the Year". Vázquez subsequently commented that he expected to win the "Boxer of the Year" award that was won by Evander Holyfield, but he accepted the selection under the circumstances. He is the only Puerto Rican boxer to be honored by having a long-distance foot race named after him, with the "Maratón Wilfredo Vázquez" being held annually in Bayamón since 1988.

Prior to many of his fights, Vázquez spent months training for them at Toluca, Mexico, a city that was also favored by such other boxing luminaries as Chávez and Salvador Sánchez for such practice

== Professional boxing record ==
68 fights	56 wins	9 losses
By knockout	41	4
By decision	15	5
Draws	2	
No contests	1	

No.	Result	Record	Opponent	Type	Round, time	Date	Location	Notes
68	Win	56–9–2 (1)	Eddy Saenz	KO	2	Oct 11, 2002	Cancha Pepín Cestero, Bayamón, Puerto Rico	
67	Win	55–9–2 (1)	Eddy Saenz	TKO	4 (8)	Jun 28, 2002	Civic Center, Kissimmee, Florida, U.S.	
66	Win	54–9–2 (1)	Julio Cesar Cardona	TKO	2 (8)	Apr 12, 2002	Miccosukee Resort & Gaming, Miami, Florida, U.S.	
65	Win	53–9–2 (1)	Juan Alfonso Rodriguez	UD	8	Feb 22, 2002	Miccosukee Resort & Gaming, Miami, Florida, U.S.	
64	Loss	52–9–2 (1)	Juan Lazcano	TKO	9 (12), 0:59	Jun 16, 2000	Mandalay Bay Events Center, Paradise, Nevada, U.S.	For vacant NABF lightweight title
63	Win	52–8–2 (1)	Russell Mosley	KO	3 (8)	Apr 15, 2000	Pechanga Resort & Casino, Temecula, California, U.S.	
62	Win	51–8–2 (1)	Antonio Oscar Salas	UD	8	Mar 11, 2000	Dade College, Miami Florida, U.S.	
61	Loss	50–8–2 (1)	Naseem Hamed	TKO	7 (12), 2:29	Apr 18, 1998	NYNEX Arena, Manchester, England	For WBO featherweight title
60	Win	50–7–2 (1)	Genaro Rios	UD	12	Nov 8, 1997	Thomas & Mack Center, Paradise, Nevada, U.S.	Retained WBA featherweight title
59	Win	49–7–2 (1)	Roque Cassiani	UD	12	Jun 4, 1997	Madison Square Garden, New York City, New York, U.S.	Retained WBA featherweight title
58	Win	48–7–2 (1)	Yuji Watanabe	KO	5 (12), 0:31	Mar 30, 1997	Ryōgoku Kokugikan, Tokyo, Japan	Retained WBA featherweight title
57	Win	47–7–2 (1)	Bernardo Mendoza	KO	5 (12), 2:37	Dec 7, 1996	Fantasy Springs Resort Casino, Indio, California, U.S.	Retained WBA featherweight title
56	Win	46–7–2 (1)	Eloy Rojas	TKO	11 (12), 2:38	May 18, 1996	The Mirage, Paradise, Nevada, U.S.	Won WBA featherweight title
55	Win	45–7–2 (1)	Jose Luis Velazquez	TKO	3 (12)	Dec 9, 1995	Caribe Hilton Hotel, San Juan, Puerto Rico	Won vacant WBA Fedelatin featherweight title
54	Win	44–7–2 (1)	Carlos Rocha	KO	1 (10)	Oct 26, 1995	Ponce, Puerto Rico	
53	Win	43–7–2 (1)	Pablo Valenzuela	UD	12	Aug 26, 1995	Miami, Florida, U.S.	
52	Loss	42–7–2 (1)	Antonio Cermeño	UD	12	May 13, 1995	Coliseo Rubén Rodríguez, Bayamón, Puerto Rico	Lost WBA super bantamweight title
51	Win	42–6–2 (1)	Orlando Canizales	SD	12	Jan 7, 1995	Freeman Coliseum, San Antonio, Texas, U.S.	Retained WBA super bantamweight title
50	Win	41–6–2 (1)	Juan Polo Perez	UD	12	Oct 13, 1994	Palais des sports Marcel-Cerdan, Levallois-Perret, France	Retained WBA super bantamweight title
49	Win	40–6–2 (1)	Jae-Won Choi	TKO	2 (12), 1:46	Jul 7, 1994	The Mirage, Paradise, Nevada, U.S.	Retained WBA super bantamweight title
48	Win	39–6–2 (1)	Yūichi Kasai	TKO	1 (12), 2:05	Mar 2, 1994	Metropolitan Gymnasium, Tokyo, Japan	Retained WBA super bantamweight title
47	Win	38–6–2 (1)	Hiroaki Yokota	UD	12	Nov 18, 1993	Korakuen Hall, Tokyo, Japan	Retained WBA super bantamweight title
46	Win	37–6–2 (1)	Thierry Jacob	KO	10 (12), 1:30	Jun 24, 1993	Vélodrome, Bordeaux, France	Retained WBA super bantamweight title
45	Win	36–6–2 (1)	Luis Mendoza	UD	12	Mar 6, 1993	Palais des sports Marcel-Cerdan, Levallois-Perret, France	Retained WBA super bantamweight title
44	Win	35–6–2 (1)	Thierry Jacob	TKO	8 (12), 0:52	Dec 5, 1992	Palais des Sports, Berck, France	Retained WBA super bantamweight title
43	Win	34–6–2 (1)	Freddy Cruz	MD	12	Jun 27, 1992	Palazzetto dello Sport, Gorle, Italy	Retained WBA super bantamweight title
42	Win	33–6–2 (1)	Juan Batista Bisono	TKO	3, 2:30	May 1, 1992	Miami, Florida, U.S.	
41	Win	32–6–2 (1)	Raúl Pérez	TKO	3 (12), 2:27	Mar 27, 1992	Palacio de los Deportes, Mexico City, Mexico	Won WBA super bantamweight title
40	Win	31–6–2 (1)	Paquito Openo	KO	7	Apr 8, 1991	Great Western Forum, Inglewood, California, U.S.	
39	Win	30–6–2 (1)	Atenor Solar	TKO	2	Nov 14, 1990	Zaragoza, Spain	
38	Win	29–6–2 (1)	Joe Orewa	TKO	12 (12)	Sep 10, 1990	Great Western Forum, Inglewood, California, U.S.	Won IBC super bantamweight title
37	Loss	28–6–2 (1)	Israel Contreras	KO	1 (10), 2:57	Jun 19, 1990	Mahi Temple Shrine Auditorium, Miami, Florida, U.S.	
36	Win	28–5–2 (1)	Patrick Kamy	KO	1 (8)	Feb 9, 1990	Zaragoza, Spain	
35	Win	27–5–2 (1)	Fernie Morales	SD	12	Oct 26, 1989	El Paso, Texas, U.S.	Won vacant IBF Inter-Continental bantamweight title
34	Loss	26–5–2 (1)	Raúl Pérez	UD	10	Aug 1, 1988	Great Western Forum, Inglewood, California, U.S.	
33	Loss	26–4–2 (1)	Kaokor Galaxy	SD	12	May 9, 1988	Indoor Stadium Huamark, Bangkok, Thailand	Lost WBA bantamweight title
32	Draw	26–3–2 (1)	Takuya Muguruma	MD	12	Jan 17, 1988	Prefectural Gymnasium, Osaka, Japan	Retained WBA bantamweight title
31	Win	26–3–1 (1)	Park Chan-yong	TKO	10 (15), 2:18	Oct 4, 1987	Hilton Hotel, Seoul, South Korea	Won WBA bantamweight title
30	Win	25–3–1 (1)	Lee Cargle	TKO	5	Apr 11, 1987	San Juan, Puerto Rico	
29	Win	24–3–1 (1)	Juan Carazo	TKO	1	Mar 14, 1987	San Juan, Puerto Rico	
28	Win	23–3–1 (1)	Jesus Muniz	KO	8 (10)	Oct 4, 1986	San Juan, Puerto Rico	
27	Loss	22–3–1 (1)	Antonio Avelar	TKO	8	May 30, 1986	Tijuana, Mexico	
26	Win	22–2–1 (1)	Jose Cervantes	KO	3	May 24, 1986	Roberto Clemente Coliseum, San Juan, Puerto Rico	
25	Loss	21–2–1 (1)	Miguel Lora	UD	12	Feb 8, 1986	Convention Center, Miami Beach, Florida, U.S.	For WBC bantamweight title
24	Win	21–1–1 (1)	Osvaldo Acevedo	TKO	5 (10), 2:05	Aug 9, 1985	Tamiami Fairgrounds Auditorium, Miami, Florida, U.S.	
23	Win	20–1–1 (1)	Jeff Whaley	TKO	3 (10), 2:33	Mar 13, 1985	Broadway by the Bay Theater, Atlantic City, New Jersey, U.S.	
22	Win	19–1–1 (1)	Norgie Castro	KO	2, 1:17	Nov 3, 1984	Hiram Bithorn Stadium, San Juan, Puerto Rico	
21	Win	18–1–1 (1)	Javier Barajas	PTS	10	Sep 19, 1984	Las Vegas, Nevada, U.S.	
20	NC	17–1–1 (1)	Julio Guerrero	NC	2 (10)	Jun 23, 1984	Roberto Clemente Coliseum, San Juan, Puerto Rico	
19	Win	17–1–1	Juan Torres	KO	4 (12)	Mar 17, 1984	Hiram Bithorn Stadium, San Juan, Puerto Rico	Won vacant Puerto Rican bantamweight title
18	Win	16–1–1	Pedro Rodriguez	TKO	3	Nov 25, 1983	Caesars Palace, Paradise, Nevada, U.S.	
17	Win	15–1–1	Ramon Cruz	KO	1 (10), 2:43	Oct 22, 1983	Tropicana, Atlantic City, New Jersey, U.S.	
16	Win	14–1–1	Robert Mullins	KO	3 (10), 2:45	Jul 22, 1983	Felt Forum, New York City, New York, U.S.	
15	Win	13–1–1	Andres Torres	KO	8	May 1, 1983	Roberto Clemente Coliseum, San Juan, Puerto Rico	
14	Win	12–1–1	Euginio Paulino	TKO	5 (8), 1:14	Feb 4, 1983	Felt Forum, New York City, New York, U.S.	
13	Win	11–1–1	Rudy Perez	KO	2	Oct 9, 1982	Showboat Hotel and Casino, Las Vegas, Nevada, U.S.	
12	Win	10–1–1	Sonny Long	PTS	10	Aug 6, 1982	Felt Forum, New York City, New York, U.S.	
11	Win	9–1–1	Jose Luis Martinez	KO	2	Jun 26, 1982	Showboat Hotel and Casino, Las Vegas, Nevada, U.S.	
10	Win	8–1–1	Ion Trian	KO	2	May 30, 1982	The Aladdin, Paradise, Nevada, U.S.	
9	Win	7–1–1	Rudy Perez	PTS	6	Mar 21, 1982	Showboat Hotel and Casino, Las Vegas, Nevada, U.S.	
8	Win	6–1–1	Orlando Perez	KO	7	Mar 3, 1982	Trujillo Alto, Puerto Rico	
7	Win	5–1–1	Pedro Alindato	KO	6	Aug 29, 1981	Trujillo Alto, Puerto Rico	
6	Win	4–1–1	Herminio Adorno	PTS	6	Aug 8, 1981	Trujillo Alto, Puerto Rico	
5	Win	3–1–1	Reinaldo Roque	KO	2	Jun 13, 1981	Convention Center, Miami Beach, Florida, U.S.	
4	Draw	2–1–1	Eusebio Espinal	PTS	6	Apr 30, 1981	Trujillo Alto, Puerto Rico	
3	Win	2–1	Roberto Mercedes	KO	3	Mar 26, 1981	Bayamón, Puerto Rico	
2	Win	1–1	Felix Cortez	KO	2	Feb 26, 1981	Trujillo Alto, Puerto Rico	
1	Loss	0–1	William Ramos	PTS	4	Jan 29, 1981	Trujillo Alto, Puerto Rico	

== Titles in boxing ==
=== Major world titles ===
- WBA bantamweight champion (118 lbs)
- WBA super bantamweight champion (122 lbs)
- WBA featherweight champion (126 lbs)

=== Minor world titles ===
- IBC super bantamweight champion (122 lbs)

=== Regional/International titles ===
- IBF Inter-Continental bantamweight champion (118 lbs)
- Puerto Rican bantamweight champion (118 lbs)
- WBA Fedelatin featherweight champion (126 lbs)

== See also ==
- Notable boxing families
- List of Puerto Rican boxing world champions
- List of world bantamweight boxing champions
- List of world super-bantamweight boxing champions
- List of world featherweight boxing champions
- List of boxing triple champions

Sporting positions
Regional boxing titles
Vacant Title last held by Juan Torres	Puerto Rican bantamweight champion March 17, 1984 – February 1986; Vacated	Vacant
Vacant Title last held by Robinson Mosquera	IBF Inter-Continental bantamweight champion October 26, 1989 – February 1990; Vacated	Vacant Title next held by Juvenal Berrio
Vacant Title last held by Miguel Arrozal	WBA Fedelatin featherweight champion December 9, 1995 – May 18, 1996; Won world title	Vacant Title next held by Roque Cassiani
Minor world boxing titles
Preceded by Joe Orewa	IBC super bantamweight champion September 10, 1990 – November 1990; Vacated	Vacant Title next held by Martin Ortegon
Major world boxing titles
Preceded by Park Chan-yong	WBA bantamweight champion October 4, 1987 – May 9, 1988	Succeeded by Kaokor Galaxy
Preceded by Raúl Pérez	WBA super bantamweight champion March 27, 1992 – May 13, 1995	Succeeded by Antonio Cermeño
Preceded by Eloy Rojas	WBA featherweight champion May 18, 1996 – March 25, 1998; Stripped	Vacant Title next held by Freddie Norwood
Preceded by Eloy Rojas	Lineal featherweight champion May 18, 1996 – April 18, 1998	Succeeded by Naseem Hamed
