= Takuya Muguruma (boxer) =

Japanese boxer (born 1961)

Takuya Muguruma 六車 卓也
Personal information
- Nickname: Endless Fighter
- Nationality: Japanese
- Born: 16 January 1961 (age 65) Osaka, Osaka, Japan
- Height: 5 ft 5 1/2 in (166 cm)
- Weight: Bantamweight; Super bantamweight

Boxing career
- Stance: Orthodox

Boxing record
- Total fights: 31
- Wins: 26
- Win by KO: 20
- Losses: 3
- Draws: 2

Takuya Muguruma (六車 卓也, Muguruma Takuya; born January 16, 1961) is a retired Japanese boxer who is a former WBA bantamweight champion. He is an alumnus of the Kinki University.

Muguruma became interested in boxing at the age of a junior high school student. In high school, he belonged to the rugby club. As Muguruma was a slow runner, he was a substitute player there. He began boxing at Osaka Teiken Boxing Gym after entering the University.

== Professional career ==
Muguruma turned professional with an amateur record of 2–1 (1 KO), and made his debut with a second-round knockout victory on April 9, 1981. He won the annual Japanese boxing series, All-Japan Rookie King Tournament in the featherweight division in February 1982. He went down a weight division to capture the Japanese super bantamweight title in November 1983, and defended that title seven times in total before returning it.

Muguruma dropped down one more weight class for the scheduled fight against Bernardo Piñango for the WBA bantamweight title. However, as Piñango gave up the title, Muguruma won over Panama's Azael Moran via a fifth-round knockout after flooring him twice, to capture the vacant WBA bantamweight title in Moriguchi, Osaka on March 29, 1987.

In his first defense against Chan Young Park in Moriguchi on May 24 of that year, Muguruma was knocked down from an accidental head butt in the third round. Although Muguruma was given a two-minute rest, he could not recover from the damage until he was stopped in the eleventh round.

In September of the same year, Muguruma was tied on points with Wilfredo Vázquez in the fight for the WBA bantamweight title at the Osaka Prefectural Gymnasium. Muguruma moved back a weight class to fight against Juan José Estrada for the WBA super bantamweight title in Moriguchi in October 1988. However he suffered an eleventh round stoppage with the towel thrown in, after being floored in the fourth and eleventh rounds, and hung up his gloves.

== Professional boxing record ==
31 fights	26 wins	3 losses
By knockout	20	2
By decision	6	1
Draws	2	

No.	Result	Record	Opponent	Type	Round, time	Date	Location	Notes
31	Loss	26–3–2	Juan José Estrada	TKO	11 (12)	1988-10-16	City Gymnasium, Moriguchi, Japan	For WBA super bantamweight title
30	Draw	26–2–2	Wilfredo Vázquez	SD	12 (12)	1988-01-17	Prefectural Gymnasium, Osaka, Japan	For WBA bantamweight title
29	Win	26–2–1	Tom Ramos	KO	7 (10)	1987-09-09	Sakuranomiya Skating Rink, Osaka, Japan	
28	Loss	25–2–1	Park Chan-yong	TKO	11 (15)	1987-05-24	City Gymnasium, Moriguchi, Japan	Lost WBA bantamweight title
27	Win	25–1–1	Azael Moran	KO	5 (15)	1987-03-29	City Gymnasium, Moriguchi, Japan	Won WBA bantamweight title
26	Win	24–1–1	Kyu Chan Jo	KO	5 (10)	1986-12-03	Osaka-jō Hall, Osaka, Japan	
25	Win	23–1–1	Youn Kap Choi	KO	2 (12)	1986-08-21	Sakuranomiya Skating Rink, Osaka, Japan	
24	Win	22–1–1	Sam Yong Kim	KO	3 (10)	1986-03-30	Sports Centre, Itami, Japan	
23	Win	21–1–1	Kazuo Osamu	TKO	5 (10)	1986-02-06	Osaka-jō Hall, Osaka, Japan	Retained Japanese super bantamweight title
22	Win	20–1–1	Satoshi Okuma	KO	2 (10)	1985-10-29	Koshigaoka Park Gymnasium, Otsu, Japan	Retained Japanese super bantamweight title
21	Win	19–1–1	Satoshi Koguchi	TKO	5 (10)	1985-06-24	Sakuranomiya Skating Rink, Osaka, Japan	Retained Japanese super bantamweight title
20	Loss	18–1–1	Youn Kap Choi	SD	12 (12)	1985-03-09	Kudok Gymnasium, Busan, South Korea	For vacant OPBF super bantamweight title
19	Draw	18–0–1	Eiji Oyama	SD	10 (10)	1984-12-04	Prefectural Gymnasium, Osaka, Japan	Retained Japanese super bantamweight title
18	Win	18–0	Masahide Ikehara	KO	4 (10)	1984-09-15	Sakuranomiya Skating Rink, Osaka, Japan	Retained Japanese super bantamweight title
17	Win	17–0	Keiji Kawamura	PTS	10 (10)	1984-06-12	Korakuen Hall, Tokyo, Japan	Retained Japanese super bantamweight title
16	Win	16–0	Kaoru Yoshioka	KO	3 (10)	1984-03-15	Osaka-jō Hall, Osaka, Japan	Retained Japanese super bantamweight title
15	Win	15–0	Hiroyuki Iwamoto	RTD	4 (10)	1983-11-28	Korakuen Hall, Tokyo, Japan	Won Japanese super bantamweight title
14	Win	14–0	Shogo Tabata	KO	1 (10)	1983-09-08	Prefectural Gymnasium, Osaka, Japan	
13	Win	13–0	Kazumi Sato	KO	4 (10)	1983-05-17	Prefectural Gymnasium, Kochi, Japan	
12	Win	12–0	Fusao Imai	KO	4 (10)	1983-04-08	Korakuen Hall, Tokyo, Japan	
11	Win	11–0	Masataka Katayama	KO	2 (8)	1983-02-24	Municipal Gym, Tsu, Japan	
10	Win	10–0	Kenzo Takasugi	KO	6 (10)	1983-01-24	Prefectural Gymnasium, Osaka, Japan	
9	Win	9–0	Masayoshi Kashiwakura	UD	8 (8)	1982-10-01	Korakuen Hall, Tokyo, Japan	
8	Win	8–0	Sumihiro Suda	KO	1 (8)	1982-08-24	Prefectural Gymnasium, Kochi, Japan	
7	Win	7–0	Kenzo Takasugi	PTS	6 (6)	1982-06-19	City Gymnasium, Iizuka, Japan	
6	Win	6–0	Mitsuru Sugiya	SD	6 (6)	1982-02-15	Prefectural Gymnasium, Osaka, Japan	
5	Win	5–0	Jun Yamaguchi	KO	4 (4)	1981-12-07	Prefectural Gymnasium, Kyoto, Japan	
4	Win	4–0	Tadashi Kawano	PTS	4 (4)	1981-09-12	Sakuranomiya Skating Rink, Osaka, Japan	
3	Win	3–0	Wolf Yoshizaki	KO	1 (4)	1981-06-21	Cultural Hall, Izumi, Japan	
2	Win	2–0	Akimitsu Haruyama	PTS	4 (4)	1981-05-28	Prefectural Gymnasium, Osaka, Japan	
1	Win	1–0	Kenji Miyagi	KO	2 (4)	1981-04-09	Prefectural Gymnasium, Wakayama, Japan	

== Post-retirement ==
Subsequently, he joined Mizuno Corporation. From 2008, he was responsible for the production of the focus mitt.

== See also ==
- Boxing in Japan
- List of Japanese boxing world champions
- List of world bantamweight boxing champions

== Bibliography ==
- Boxing Magazine editorial department, ed. (May 31, 2002). 日本プロボクシング史 世界タイトルマッチで見る50年 (Japan Pro Boxing History – 50 Years of World Title Bouts) (in Japanese). Tokyo, Japan: Baseball Magazine Sha Co., Ltd. pp. 161–162, 175, 298. ISBN 978-4-583-03695-3.

Sporting positions
Regional boxing titles
Preceded by Hiroyuki Iwamoto	Japanese super bantamweight champion November 28, 1983 – 1986; Vacated	Vacant Title next held by Mark Horikoshi
World boxing titles
Vacant Title last held by Bernardo Piñango	WBA bantamweight champion March 29, 1987 – May 24, 1987	Succeeded by Park Chan-yong
