= Noree Jockygym =

Thai boxer

Personal information
- Nationality: Thai
- Born: Visan Thummong (วิสันต์ ทุ่มโมง); 18 June 1970 (age 56) Amphoe Yasothon (now Mueang Yasothon, Yasothon province), Ubon Ratchathani province, Thailand
- Weight: Junior featherweight Junior lightweight

Boxing career

Boxing record
- Total fights: 67
- Wins: 46
- Win by KO: 29
- Losses: 19
- Draws: 2
- No contests: 0

Noree Jockygym (Thai: โนรี จ๊อกกี้ยิม; born: 18 June 1970), also known as Khongdee Meekhunapparp (ของดี มีคุณภาพ), is a retired Thai professional boxer who held the WBF Junior lightweight world champion in the 1990s.

== Biography and career ==
Jockygym was born in Tambon Nam Kham Yai, Amphoe Yasothon, which was part of Ubon Ratchathani province at the time (now Yasothon province). He developed a passion for boxing from a young age. His father took him to train at Jocky Gym, located near Rama VI Bridge in Bangkok, which was owned and managed by Sommart Hongsakul.

He trained alongside notable fighters such as Samart Payakaroon and Khaosai Galaxy, and had both wins and losses against Daorung Chuvatana. At the age of 18, he won the Rajadamnern Stadium Junior Featherweight Championship, which was considered equivalent to a national title.

His breakthrough came on February 11, 1990, when he defeated Naoto Takahashi, a Japanese boxer, at the Tokyo Dome in Japan, on the undercard of the historic Mike Tyson vs. Buster Douglas fight. After winning five more fights in Thailand, he was given a chance to challenge Luis Enrique Mendoza of Colombia for the WBA Junior Featherweight World Title on January 20, 1991, at Pantip Plaza, Bangkok. Unfortunately, he was knocked out in the ninth round.

Following that, his career became inconsistent, alternating between wins and losses. He later served as a sparring partner for the rising star Saen Sor Ploenchit, due to his experience and higher weight class.

In 1997, he changed stable, joining Orathai Kanchanachoosak, a Sino-Thai businesswoman who ran a boxing gym in Bangkok's Chinatown. She had inherited the business from her father, Song Kanchanachoosak, a well-connected businessman in the area. He also changed his ring name to "Khongdee Meekhunapparp". That same year, on May 23, he challenged Shawn Simmons of the U.S. for the WBF Junior Lightweight Title at Central Plaza Pinklao, and won by a fifth-round knockout.

During this period, he regained both fame and fortune. However, his personal life deteriorated—he neglected his wife, who eventually divorced him. He was stripped of his WBF title in early 2000. His final bout took place on November 10, 2001, when he was knocked out in the third round by fellow Thai boxer Kularbdang Kiatkrerin.

== After retirement ==
After retirement, he was arrested by the police for drugs and trafficking in ya ba (tablets of methamphetamine and caffeine popular in Thailand) in 2001. He was sentenced to three years and six months in prison.

As of 2016, he was homeless. He lived around Ratchawong Pier in Chinatown, where he made a living by helping tourists and keeping watch over the safety of passengers using the Chao Phraya Express Boat. In return, people would give him small tips.

Although his relatives tried to persuade him to return to his hometown, he refused. He remained attached to the pier, as it was near the site of his former boxing gym. On the outside, he looked like a madman. But in truth, he was not insane; he was still of sound mind like any ordinary person. He simply chose to live his life that way.
