= Colin McMillan =

English boxer

Personal information
- Nickname: Sweet C
- Nationality: English
- Born: 12 February 1966 (age 60) London, England
- Weight: Featherweight

Boxing career
- Stance: Orthodox

Boxing record
- Total fights: 35
- Wins: 31
- Win by KO: 14
- Losses: 4

Colin McMillan (born 12 February 1966) is an English former professional boxer who competed from 1988 to 1997. He fought his way to the British featherweight title in 1991. After successfully defending his British title, he added the Commonwealth title in 1992 before beating Maurizio Stecca for the WBO featherweight title that same year. Known in fighting circles as Sweet C, McMillan lost his WBO belt on his first defence, when he was unable to continue against Rubén Darío Palacios due to a dislocated shoulder.

Sporting positions
Preceded by (Italy) Maurizio Stecca	WBO Featherweight Champion; 16 February 1992–26 September 1992	Succeeded by (Colombia) Rubén Darío Palacios
