= Orlando Canizales =

American boxer

Personal information
- Born: Orlando Canizales; November 25, 1965 (age 60) Laredo, Webb County, Texas, U.S.
- Height: 5 ft 4 in (163 cm)
- Weight: Bantamweight; Super bantamweight; Featherweight

Boxing career
- Reach: 65 in (165 cm)
- Stance: Orthodox

Boxing record
- Total fights: 57
- Wins: 50
- Win by KO: 37
- Losses: 5
- Draws: 1
- No contests: 1

Orlando Canizales (born November 25, 1965) is an American former professional boxer who competed from 1984 to 1999. He held the International Boxing Federation (IBF) bantamweight title from 1988 to 1994.

== Early life ==
Canizales who is of Mexican descent was born in Laredo, the seat of Webb County in South Texas. There he began training at the age of ten at the Boys and Girls Clubs of America. He is the younger brother of fellow bantamweight world champion Gaby Canizales. Both brothers obtained the title of world boxing champion at the same age and weight.

== Professional boxing career ==
Canizales turned professional in 1984 and was undefeated in twelve fights (one fight was a draw) before meeting the 1984 Olympic gold medalist Paul Gonzales in 1986. Gonzales defeated him over twelve rounds. Canizales rebounded from that defeat, however, and on July 9, 1988, he won the IBF bantamweight title by knocking out defending titlist Kelvin Seabrooks in the fifteenth round. He tied the division record for consecutive title defences at 15 set by Manuel Ortiz. His victims included old foe Gonzales, former flyweight champion Rolando Bohol, British champion Billy Hardy, and future champion Clarence "Bones" Adams. Many people incorrectly state that Orlando Canizales made 16 consecutive defences. This is due to many of them counting a no contest with Derrick Whiteboy as a title defence. No contests are not title defences however as the champion can't defend his title in a match that isn't considered to be a proper boxing contest.

In January 1995, Canizales attempted to win a title in the junior featherweight division. World Boxing Association champion Wilfredo Vazquez prevented him from doing so, winning a twelve-round split decision.

He continued fighting until 1999, when future champion Frank Toledo defeated him via ten-round split decision. He retired after that loss.

He was inducted into the International Boxing Hall of Fame on July 14, 2009. With his parents watching, an emotional Canizales approached the podium and delivered a heartfelt speech. "Boxing has taught me a lot in life -- that dedication, discipline and determination will pay off in the long run and not to be easily swayed by obstacles and bumps in the road."

The Orlando & Gaby Canizales Boxing Gym and Community Center on Guadalupe Street in Laredo is named in honor of Orlando and his brother Gaby.

== Professional boxing record ==
57 fights	50 wins	5 losses
By knockout	37	0
By decision	13	5
Draws	1	
No contests	1	

No.	Result	Record	Opponent	Type	Round, time	Date	Location	Notes
57	Loss	50–5–1 (1)	Frank Toledo	SD	10	Sep 24, 1999	The Blue Horizon, Philadelphia, Pennsylvania, U.S.	
56	Win	50–4–1 (1)	Richard De Jesus	RTD	6 (10), 3:00	Jun 4, 1999	The Blue Horizon, Philadelphia, Pennsylvania, U.S.	
55	Loss	49–4–1 (1)	Richard De Jesus	MD	10	Dec 11, 1998	The Blue Horizon, Philadelphia, Pennsylvania, U.S.	
54	Win	49–3–1 (1)	Tomas Valdez	KO	3 (10)	Oct 22, 1998	Reseda Country Club, Reseda, California, U.S.	
53	Win	48–3–1 (1)	Javier Diaz	UD	10	May 29, 1998	Sheraton Hotel, Houston, Texas, U.S.	
52	Win	47–3–1 (1)	Jose Luis Montes	KO	7 (10), 2:57	Mar 21, 1998	Congress Theatre, Chicago, Illinois, U.S.	
51	Win	46–3–1 (1)	Edwin Santana	MD	12	Jul 25, 1997	Tropicana Las Vegas, Las Vegas, Nevada, U.S.	Retained IBA featherweight title
50	Win	45–3–1 (1)	Manuel Arellano	RTD	5 (10), 3:00	May 9, 1997	Orleans Hotel and Casino, Las Vegas, Nevada, U.S.	
49	Win	44–3–1 (1)	Roland Gomez	KO	4 (10), 2:57	Mar 1, 1997	Convention Center, Atlantic City, New Jersey, U.S.	
48	Win	43–3–1 (1)	Sergio Reyes	TKO	10 (12), 0:28	Nov 3, 1996	Tokyo Bay NK Hall, Tokyo, Japan	Won vacant IBA featherweight title
47	Loss	42–3–1 (1)	Junior Jones	SD	12	Mar 23, 1996	Madison Square Garden, New York City, New York, U.S.	
46	Win	42–2–1 (1)	Julio Cesar Portillo	TKO	2 (12), 2:36	Nov 4, 1995	Caesars Palace, Las Vegas, Nevada, U.S.	
45	Win	41–2–1 (1)	Danny Aponte	TKO	7 (12), 1:49	Sep 12, 1995	Biloxi, Mississippi, U.S.	
44	Win	40–2–1 (1)	Johnny Lewus	UD	12	Jul 15, 1995	Caesars Tahoe, Stateline, Nevada, U.S.	
43	Win	39–2–1 (1)	Kino Rodriguez	KO	2 (10), 2:43	Jun 10, 1995	Municipal Auditorium, Kansas City, Missouri, U.S.	
42	Loss	38–2–1 (1)	Wilfredo Vazquez	SD	12	Jan 7, 1995	Freeman Coliseum, San Antonio, Texas, U.S.	For WBA super bantamweight title
41	Win	38–1–1 (1)	Sergio Reyes	UD	12	Oct 15, 1994	Martin Field, Laredo, Texas, U.S.	Retained IBF bantamweight title
40	Win	37–1–1 (1)	Rolando Bohol	KO	5 (12), 0:27	Jun 7, 1994	Convention Center, South Padre Island, Texas, U.S.	Retained IBF bantamweight title
39	Win	36–1–1 (1)	Gerardo Martinez	TKO	4 (12), 2:22	Feb 26, 1994	San Jose State Events Center, San Jose, California, U.S.	Retained IBF bantamweight title
38	Win	35–1–1 (1)	Juvenal Berrio	UD	12	Nov 20, 1993	Carousel Casino, Hammanskraal, South Africa	Retained IBF bantamweight title
37	NC	34–1–1 (1)	Derrick Whiteboy	KO	3 (12), 1:23	Jun 19, 1993	The Summit, Houston, Texas, U.S.	IBF bantamweight title at stake
36	Win	34–1–1	Clarence Adams	TKO	11 (12), 1:32	Mar 27, 1993	Casino Royal, Evian les Bains, France	Retained IBF bantamweight title
35	Win	33–1–1	Samuel Duran	UD	12	Sep 18, 1992	Brick Breeden Fieldhouse, Bozeman, Montana, U.S.	Retained IBF bantamweight title
34	Win	32–1–1	Fernando Ramos	KO	8 (10)	Jul 11, 1992	Stade Louis II, Fontvieille, Monaco	
33	Win	31–1–1	Francisco Alvarez	UD	12	Apr 23, 1992	Cirque d'Hiver, Paris, France	Retained IBF bantamweight title
32	Win	30–1–1	Ray Minus	TKO	11 (12), 1:45	Dec 21, 1991	Civic Center Arena, Laredo, Texas, U.S.	Retained IBF bantamweight title
31	Win	29–1–1	Fernie Morales	UD	12	Sep 21, 1991	Desert Expo Center, Indio, California, U.S.	Retained IBF bantamweight title
30	Win	28–1–1	Billy Hardy	TKO	8 (12), 1:08	May 4, 1991	Civic Center Arena, Laredo, Texas, U.S.	Retained IBF bantamweight title
29	Win	27–1–1	Francisco Ortiz	UD	10	Dec 14, 1990	Sands Hotel & Casino, Las Vegas, Nevada, U.S.	
28	Win	26–1–1	Eddie Rangel	KO	5 (12), 0:32	Aug 14, 1990	City Center, Saratoga Springs, New York, U.S.	Retained IBF bantamweight title
27	Win	25–1–1	Paul Gonzales	TKO	2 (12), 0:30	Jun 10, 1990	County Coliseum, El Paso, Texas, U.S.	Retained IBF bantamweight title
26	Win	24–1–1	Jesus Portillo	TKO	6 (?)	Apr 27, 1990	Dallas, Texas, U.S.	
25	Win	23–1–1	Billy Hardy	SD	12	Jan 24, 1990	Crowtree Leisure Centre, Sunderland, United Kingdom	Retained IBF bantamweight title
24	Win	22–1–1	Kelvin Seabrooks	TKO	11 (12), 0:47	Jun 24, 1989	Harrah's Marina Hotel Casino, Atlantic City, New Jersey, U.S.	Retained IBF bantamweight title
23	Win	21–1–1	Jimmy Navarro	KO	1 (12), 2:39	Nov 29, 1988	Freeman Coliseum, San Antonio, Texas, U.S.	Retained IBF bantamweight title
22	Win	20–1–1	Kelvin Seabrooks	TKO	15 (15), 1:03	Jul 9, 1988	Sands Atlantic City, Atlantic City, New Jersey, U.S.	Won IBF bantamweight title
21	Win	19–1–1	Louis Curtis	TKO	2 (12), 1:52	Apr 15, 1988	Atlantic City, New Jersey, U.S.	Won vacant USBA super flyweight title
20	Win	18–1–1	Armando Velasco	TKO	4 (12), 2:12	Nov 12, 1987	Houston, Texas, U.S.	Won NABF flyweight title
19	Win	17–1–1	Jose Olivares	KO	4 (10), 0:44	Sep 25, 1987	Fiesta Plaza Mall, San Antonio, Texas, U.S.	
18	Win	16–1–1	Alonzo Gonzalez	UD	10	Jun 3, 1987	San Jose Civic Auditorium, San Jose, California, U.S.	
17	Win	15–1–1	Javier Lucas	KO	9 (10), 1:51	Feb 20, 1987	San Jose Civic Auditorium, San Jose, California, U.S.	
16	Win	14–1–1	Prudencio Cardona	TKO	6 (10), 1:58	Jan 30, 1987	Fiesta Plaza Mall, San Antonio, Texas, U.S.	
15	Win	13–1–1	Jorge Vazquez	KO	2 (10), 1:58	Dec 11, 1986	Marriot Brookhollow, Houston, Texas, U.S.	
14	Win	12–1–1	Juan Garcia	KO	1 (8)	Sep 27, 1986	Bluebonnet Convention Center, Victoria, Texas, U.S.	
13	Loss	11–1–1	Paul Gonzales	UD	12	Jul 20, 1986	Caesars Tahoe, Winners All Outdoor Stadium, Stateline, Nevada, U.S.	For NABF flyweight title
12	Win	11–0–1	Javier Diaz	UD	10	May 6, 1986	La Villita Assembly Hall, San Antonio, Texas, U.S.	
11	Win	10–0–1	Cuauhtémoc Villenueva	KO	2 (6), 2:08	Mar 12, 1986	Ramada-Houston Hotel, Houston, Texas, U.S.	
10	Win	9–0–1	Jorge Fuentes Martinez	KO	5 (6)	Dec 12, 1985	Sam Houston Coliseum, Houston, Texas, U.S.	
9	Win	8–0–1	Steve Whetstone	KO	3 (6)	Nov 20, 1985	Woodlands Inn, Conroe, Texas, U.S.	
8	Win	7–0–1	Armando Castro	UD	6	Oct 18, 1985	West Martin Field, Laredo, Texas, U.S.	
7	Win	6–0–1	Rolando Luna	KO	1 (6)	Oct 9, 1985	Mezzanine Arena, Houston, Texas, U.S.	
6	Win	5–0–1	Manuel Gago	TKO	2 (6), 1:04	Jul 26, 1985	Atlantis Hotel and Casino, Atlantic City, New Jersey, U.S.	
5	Win	4–0–1	Nelson Garcia	TKO	1 (6), 2:10	May 9, 1985	Hyatt Regency Houston, Houston, Texas, U.S.	
4	Win	3–0–1	Juan Camero	TKO	1 (6)	Apr 9, 1985	Hyatt Regency Houston, Houston, Texas, U.S.	
3	Draw	2–0–1	Rogelio Leanos	PTS	4	Mar 5, 1985	Sam Houston Coliseum, Houston, Texas, U.S.	
2	Win	2–0	Reymundo Eureste	KO	1 (4), 3:08	Nov 9, 1984	Freeman Coliseum, San Antonio, Texas, U.S.	
1	Win	1–0	Juan Perez	TKO	2 (4)	Aug 25, 1984	Riverdrive Mall Parking Lot, Laredo, Texas, U.S.	

Sporting positions
Regional boxing titles
New title	USBA super flyweight champion April 15 – July 9, 1988; Vacated	Vacant Title next held by Ray Medel
World boxing titles
Preceded by Kelvin Seabrooks	IBF bantamweight champion July 9, 1988 - December 21, 1994; Vacated	Vacant Title next held by Harold Mestre
