= Rubén Darío Palacio =

Colombian boxer (1962–2003)

Personal information
- Nickname: El Huracan ("The Hurricane")
- Born: Rubén Darío Palacio Ceballos; 1 December 1962 La Sierra, Colombia
- Died: 14 November 2003 (aged 40) Medellín, Colombia
- Height: 5 ft 4 in (163 cm)
- Weight: Bantamweight; Super bantamweight; Featherweight; Super featherweight

Boxing career
- Stance: Orthodox

Boxing record
- Total fights: 58
- Wins: 45
- Win by KO: 19
- Losses: 11
- Draws: 2

Ruben Darío "El Huracán" Palacio (1 December 1962 in Puerto Nare, Antioquia – 14 November 2003 in Medellín, Colombia) was a Colombian boxer.

== Professional career ==
Palacio fought 11 years before surprisingly winning the WBO title in England with an eighth-round technical knockout of British star Colin McMillan after McMillan dislocated his shoulder on 26 September 1992.

Before that, Palacio had tried unsuccessfully to win a world title on 3 occasions and never gave up on his dream, even when he had very low points in his career (between 1984 and 1986, for example, he lost 4 out of 5 fights).

He was very much the underdog against the flashy 23-1 McMillan but Palacio had his night of glory that day in London. Ironically, he returned to England to defend his title and then he was diagnosed with the HIV virus by the British Boxing Board of Control. Palacio had to relinquish the belt he had waited so long to win and retired with a 45-11-2 (19 KO) record.

== Professional boxing record ==
| 58 fights | 45 wins | 11 losses |
|---|---|---|
| By knockout | 19 | 7 |
| By decision | 26 | 4 |
| Draws | 2 | |

| No. | Result | Record | Opponent | Type | Round, time | Date | Location | Notes |
|---|---|---|---|---|---|---|---|---|
| 58 | Win | 45–11–2 | Colin McMillan | TKO | 8 (12) | 1992-09-26 | Olympia, London, England, U.K. | Won WBO featherweight title |
| 57 | Win | 44–11–2 | Dionisio Blanco | TKO | 4 (10) | 1992-07-03 | Envigado, Colombia | |
| 56 | Win | 43–11–2 | Alberto Zuluaga | PTS | 10 (10) | 1992-04-11 | Bogotá, Colombia | |
| 55 | Loss | 42–11–2 | Mario Fuentes | TKO | 4 (10) | 1991-11-22 | Arena Naucalpan, Naucalpan, Mexico | |
| 54 | Win | 42–10–2 | Omar Gonzalez | TKO | 4 (12) | 1991-07-31 | Cartagena, Colombia | Won vacant Colombian super-featherweight title |
| 53 | Loss | 41–10–2 | Ever Beleno | PTS | 10 (10) | 1991-06-14 | Cartagena, Colombia | |
| 52 | Loss | 41–9–2 | Joon Huh | KO | 2 (10) | 1991-02-03 | Geumho Citizen Gymnasium, Yeongcheon, South Korea | |
| 51 | Win | 41–8–2 | Juan De la Cruz | TKO | 7 (10) | 1990-11-10 | Puerto Nare, Colombia | |
| 50 | Loss | 40–8–2 | Luis Mendoza | TKO | 3 (12) | 1990-09-11 | Jai Alai Fronton, Miami, Florida, U.S. | For vacant WBA super-bantamweight title |
| 49 | Draw | 40–7–2 | Luis Mendoza | SD | 12 (12) | 1990-05-25 | Plaza de toros de Cartagena, Cartagena, Colombia | For vacant WBA super-bantamweight title |
| 48 | Win | 40–7–1 | Luis Navarro | KO | 2 (?) | 1990-02-17 | Apartadó, Colombia | |
| 47 | Win | 39–7–1 | Praphan Khamcha | UD | 10 (10) | 1989-11-18 | Samut Sakhon, Thailand | |
| 46 | Win | 38–7–1 | Deus James Pemberti | PTS | 8 (8) | 1989-07-15 | Barranquilla, Colombia | |
| 45 | Win | 37–7–1 | Angel Vargas | TKO | 4 (?) | 1989-04-29 | Roberto Clemente Coliseum, San Juan, Puerto Rico | |
| 44 | Win | 36–7–1 | Daniel Blanco | KO | 3 (?) | 1989-03-03 | Medellín, Colombia | |
| 43 | Win | 35–7–1 | Gustavo Espitia | KO | 3 (?) | 1989-01-28 | Apartadó, Colombia | |
| 42 | Win | 34–7–1 | Luis Berrio | KO | 4 (?) | 1988-12-16 | Barranquilla, Colombia | |
| 41 | Win | 33–7–1 | Juan Gomez Polo | PTS | 8 (8) | 1988-12-02 | Barranquilla, Colombia | |
| 40 | Win | 32–7–1 | Alvaro Narvaez | PTS | 12 (12) | 1988-10-07 | Bello, Colombia | |
| 39 | Win | 31–7–1 | Gustavo Espitia | KO | 1 (?) | 1988-09-10 | Colombia | |
| 38 | Win | 30–7–1 | Jaime Castellon | TD | 7 (12) | 1988-05-21 | Coliseo Vicente Díaz Romero, Bucaramanga, Colombia | |
| 37 | Win | 29–7–1 | Pedro Arroyo | MD | 10 (10) | 1988-03-30 | Holiday Beach Hotel, Willemstad, Curaçao | |
| 36 | Win | 28–7–1 | Manuel Mejia | TKO | 4 (12) | 1988-02-05 | Medellín, Colombia | |
| 35 | Win | 27–7–1 | Luis Mendieta | KO | 2 (?) | 1987-12-19 | Medellín, Colombia | |
| 34 | Win | 26–7–1 | Alvaro Bohorquez | PTS | 10 (10) | 1987-10-30 | Montería, Colombia | Won vacant Colombian featherweight title |
| 33 | Win | 25–7–1 | Eduardo Rodriguez | PTS | 8 (8) | 1987-08-25 | Laredo, Colombia | |
| 32 | Loss | 24–7–1 | Rafael Zuñiga | TKO | 2 (10) | 1987-05-25 | Cartagena, Colombia | |
| 31 | Win | 24–6–1 | Ley Umba Sengi | PTS | 8 (8) | 1986-10-10 | Palazzo Dello Sport, Cesena, Italy | |
| 30 | Win | 23–6–1 | Vicente Jorge | KO | 4 (?) | 1986-09-19 | Lerici, Italy | |
| 29 | Win | 22–6–1 | Faical Naifer | PTS | 8 (8) | 1986-07-04 | Porlezza, Italy | |
| 28 | Loss | 21–6–1 | Jim McDonnell | TKO | 7 (10) | 1986-05-07 | Royal Albert Hall, London, England, U.K. | |
| 27 | Loss | 21–5–1 | Valerio Nati | PTS | 10 (10) | 1985-10-12 | Palazzo Dello Sport, Cesena, Italy | |
| 26 | Loss | 21–4–1 | Kim Ji-won | UD | 15 (15) | 1985-03-30 | Suwon Gymnasium, Suwon, South Korea | For IBF super-bantamweight title |
| 25 | Win | 21–3–1 | José Cervantes | KO | 8 (10) | 1984-12-14 | Cartagena, Colombia | |
| 24 | Loss | 20–3–1 | Tommy Valoy | KO | 11 (12) | 1984-09-03 | Sentro Deportivo Korsou, Willemstad, Curaçao | For vacant WBC Continental Americas super-bantamweight title |
| 23 | Win | 20–2–1 | Jefferson Gomez | PTS | 10 (10) | 1984-06-29 | Buenaventura, Colombia | Won vacant Colombian super-bantamweight title |
| 22 | Win | 19–2–1 | Hilario Diaz | PTS | 10 (10) | 1984-05-24 | Caracas, Venezuela | |
| 21 | Win | 18–2–1 | Mario Livingston | PTS | 10 (10) | 1984-05-11 | San Andrés, Colombia | |
| 20 | Win | 17–2–1 | Bernardino Rubio | PTS | 8 (8) | 1984-02-12 | Medellín, Colombia | |
| 19 | Draw | 16–2–1 | Pedro Barrera | PTS | 10 (10) | 1983-12-23 | Barranquilla, Colombia | |
| 18 | Win | 16–2 | Antonio Nisperuza | PTS | 10 (10) | 1983-10-05 | Turbo, Colombia | |
| 17 | Loss | 15–2 | José Cervantes | KO | 4 (?) | 1983-07-15 | Cartagena, Colombia | |
| 16 | Win | 15–1 | Carlos Garcia | KO | 6 (10) | 1983-06-06 | Colombia | |
| 15 | Loss | 14–1 | Miguel Lora | PTS | 12 (12) | 1983-05-12 | Montería, Colombia | For vacant WBC Continental Americas bantamweight title |
| 14 | Win | 14–0 | Daniel Martinez | KO | 2 (?) | 1983-03-26 | Plaza de toros de Cartagena, Cartagena, Colombia | |
| 13 | Win | 13–0 | Henry Diaz | KO | 4 (?) | 1983-03-06 | Colombia | |
| 12 | Win | 12–0 | Miguel Maturana | TKO | 10 (10) | 1982-12-18 | Plaza Monumental, Cartagena, Colombia | Retained Colombian bantamweight title |
| 11 | Win | 11–0 | Homer Meza | PTS | 12 (12) | 1982-10-30 | Medellín, Colombia | Won Colombian bantamweight title |
| 10 | Win | 10–0 | Wilson Salgado | KO | 2 (?) | 1982-06-15 | Cartagena, Colombia | |
| 9 | Win | 9–0 | Francisco Alvarez | PTS | 10 (10) | 1982-04-17 | Cartagena, Colombia | |
| 8 | Win | 8–0 | Jose Rodriguez | PTS | 10 (10) | 1982-03-05 | Cartagena, Colombia | |
| 7 | Win | 7–0 | Valerio Zea | PTS | 10 (10) | 1981-12-15 | San Onofre, Colombia | |
| 6 | Win | 6–0 | Pedro Rengifo | PTS | 10 (10) | 1981-09-18 | Colombia | |
| 5 | Win | 5–0 | Rafael Correa | PTS | 8 (8) | 1981-08-09 | Colombia | |
| 4 | Win | 4–0 | Antonio Galviz | PTS | 8 (8) | 1981-07-17 | Coliseo Humberto Perea, Barranquilla, Colombia | |
| 3 | Win | 3–0 | Hector Franklin | PTS | 6 (6) | 1981-06-21 | Colombia | |
| 2 | Win | 2–0 | Alexis Klinger | PTS | 6 (6) | 1981-05-05 | Colombia | |
| 1 | Win | 1–0 | Juan Mercado | PTS | 6 (6) | 1981-04-27 | Colombia | |

== Life after boxing ==
After relinquishing the belt, the former champion's life was a tragic downward spiral. He was arrested on drug trafficking charges in the US a year after and spent four years in jail.

== Death ==
Palacio died of AIDS in a hospital in Medellín, Colombia on 14 November 2003. He was a few weeks short of his 41st birthday.

== See also ==
- List of world featherweight boxing champions

Sporting positions
Regional boxing titles
| Preceded by Homer Meza | Colombian bantamweight champion 30 October 1982 – 1983; Vacated | Vacant Title next held by Francisco Álvarez |
| Vacant Title last held by Franklin Salas | Colombian super-bantamweight champion 29 June 1984 – 1985; Vacated | Vacant Title next held by Moises Fuentes Rocha |
| Vacant Title last held by Felipe Angulo | Colombian featherweight champion 30 October 1987 – 1989; Vacated | Vacant Title next held by Rafael Zuñiga |
| Vacant Title last held by Wilfrido Rocha | Colombian super-featherweight champion 31 July 1991 – 1989; Vacated | Vacant Title next held by Jimmy Garcia |
World boxing titles
| Preceded by Colin McMillan | WBO featherweight champion 26 September 1992 – 16 April 1993; Stripped | Vacant Title next held by Steve Robinson |
