= Park Chan-young =

Park Chan-young may refer to:

- Park Chan-young (handballer) (born 1983), South Korean handball player

== See also ==
- Park Chae-young
- Park Chan-yong (disambiguation)
