= Raúl Pérez (boxer) =

Mexican boxer

Personal information
- Nickname: Jíbaro ("Skinny one")
- Born: Raúl Ruiz Pérez; 14 February 1967 (age 59) Tijuana, Baja California, Mexico
- Height: 5 ft 11 in (180 cm)
- Weight: Bantamweight; Super bantamweight; Featherweight; Super featherweight

Boxing career
- Reach: 74 in (188 cm)
- Stance: Orthodox

Boxing record
- Total fights: 71
- Wins: 61
- Win by KO: 42
- Losses: 6
- Draws: 3
- No contests: 1

Raúl Ruiz Pérez (born 14 February 1967) is a Mexican former professional boxer who competed between 1984 and 2000. He is a world champion in two weight classes, having held the World Boxing Council (WBC) bantamweight title from 1988 to 1991 and the World Boxing Association (WBA) super bantamweight title from 1991 to 1992.

== Professional career ==
Known as "Jibaro", Perez turned pro in 1984 with a knockout victory over Jose Alvarado. Before challenging for a world title, he accumulated a record of 61-6-3, with victories over former champion Prudencio Cardona and future champions Gaby Canizales and Wilfredo Vazquez. He lost to Vazquez in a rematch.

=== WBC bantamweight title ===
In 1988, Pérez defeated Miguel Lora for the WBC bantamweight title in an extremely bloody fight in which both fighters were cut. He defended the title six times against capable challengers Lucio Omar Lopez, Cardenio Ulloa, Diego Avila, Gerardo Martinez, Jose Valdez, Candelario Carmona, and Gaby Canizales in a rematch. In 1991, he lost his title to Greg Richardson by decision.

=== WBA super bantamweight title ===
He moved up in weight later that year to defeat WBA super bantamweight title holder Luis Mendoza by decision. He lost the belt in his first defense by third round tko to Wilfredo Vazquez in a rematch.

=== Super featherweight and retirement ===
In 1993, Perez moved up to the Super featherweight division where he unsuccessfully challenged WBA champion Genaro Hernandez, losing by 8th round knockout. He remained inactive for nearly two years, and in 1995, he suffered another knockout loss to Luisito Espinoza. He retired in 2000 after a loss to Hector Velazquez.

== Professional boxing record ==
71 fights	61 wins	6 losses
By knockout	42	4
By decision	19	2
Draws	3	
No contests	1	

No.	Result	Record	Opponent	Type	Round	Date	Location	Notes
71	Loss	61–6–3 (1)	Hector Velazquez	TKO	8 (10), 1:32	18 Aug 2000	Orleans Hotel & Casino, Paradise, Nevada, U.S.	
70	Win	61–6–3 (1)	Valentin Lopez	KO	4 (12)	31 Mar 2000	Spa Resort Casino, Palm Springs, California, U.S.	Won WBC FECARBOX featherweight title
69	Win	60–5–3 (1)	Jose Luis Montes	TKO	4 (10), 2:42	15 Jan 2000	Pal Gymnasium, Homestead, Florida, U.S.	
68	Win	59–5–3 (1)	Roberto Martinez	KO	4 (?)	18 Dec 1999	Culiacán, Sinaloa, Mexico	
67	Win	58–5–3 (1)	Alejandro Ramirez	TKO	4 (?)	29 Oct 1999	Tijuana, Baja California, Mexico	
66	Win	57–5–3 (1)	Roberto Vera Ibarra	KO	3 (?)	3 Sep 1999	Tijuana, Baja California, Mexico	
65	Win	56–5–3 (1)	Juan Gutierrez	TKO	4 (10)	10 Jul 1999	Plaza de Toros Calafia, Mexicali, Baja California, Mexico	
64	Win	55–5–3 (1)	Carlos Barragan	UD	10	5 Mar 1999	Pechanga Resort & Casino, Temecula, California, U.S.	
63	Win	54–5–3 (1)	Janing Fong Kee	KO	2 (10)	15 Feb 1999	Tijuana, Baja California, Mexico	
62	Win	53–5–3 (1)	Carlos Zamora	KO	3 (?)	11 Dec 1998	Auditorio Benito Juarez, Los Mochis, Sinaloa, Mexico	
61	Win	52–5–3 (1)	Carlos Badillo	TKO	2 (?)	13 Nov 1998	Tijuana, Baja California, Mexico	
60	Win	51–5–3 (1)	Pablo Valenzuela	KO	3 (10)	8 Oct 1998	Auditorio Municipal, Tijuana, Baja California, Mexico	
59	Loss	50–5–3 (1)	Luisito Espinosa	KO	1 (10), 1:56	9 Oct 1995	Korakuen Hall, Tokyo, Japan	
58	NC	50–4–3 (1)	Rafael Meran	NC	2 (12), 1:13	18 Mar 1995	Jai Alai Fronton, Miami, Florida, U.S.	NC after Pérez was knocked out by an illegal punch in the neck
57	Loss	50–4–3	Genaro Hernández	KO	8 (12), 2:11	28 Jun 1993	Great Western Forum, Inglewood, California, U.S.	For WBA super featherweight title
56	Draw	50–3–3	Genaro Hernández	TD	1 (12), 2:38	26 Apr 1993	Great Western Forum, Inglewood, California, U.S.	For WBA super featherweight title; Fight stopped due to accidental head clash
55	Win	50–3–2	Miguel Angel Pena	TKO	8 (10)	13 Feb 1993	Jai Alai Fronton, Miami, Florida, U.S.	
54	Loss	49–3–2	Wilfredo Vázquez	TKO	3 (12), 2:27	27 Mar 1992	Palacio de los Deportes, Mexico City, Mexico	Lost WBA super bantamweight title
53	Win	49–2–2	Luis Mendoza	SD	12	7 Oct 1991	Great Western Forum, Inglewood, California, U.S.	Won WBA super bantamweight title
52	Loss	48–2–2	Greg Richardson	UD	12	25 Feb 1991	Great Western Forum, Inglewood, California, U.S.	Lost WBC bantamweight title
51	Win	48–1–2	Candelario Carmona	KO	8 (12), 2:17	17 Dec 1990	Auditorio Municipal, Tijuana, Baja California, Mexico	Retained WBC bantamweight title
50	Draw	47–1–2	Jose Valdez	SD	12	14 Sep 1990	Plaza de Toros La Sinaloense, Culiacán, Sinaloa, Mexico	Retained WBC bantamweight title
49	Win	47–1–1	Gerardo Martinez	TKO	9 (12), 0:31	7 May 1990	Great Western Forum, Inglewood, California, U.S.	Retained WBC bantamweight title
48	Win	46–1–1	Gaby Canizales	UD	12	22 Jan 1990	Great Western Forum, Inglewood, California, U.S.	Retained WBC bantamweight title
47	Win	45–1–1	Diego Avila	UD	12	23 Oct 1989	Great Western Forum, Inglewod, California, U.S.	Retained WBC bantamweight title
46	Win	44–1–1	Cardenio Ulloa	TKO	8 (12)	26 Aug 1989	Coliseo La Tortuga, Talcahuano, Chile	Retained WBC bantamweight title
45	Win	43–1–1	Lucio Omar Lopez	UD	12	9 Mar 1989	Sports Arena, Los Angeles, California, U.S.	Retained WBC bantamweight title
44	Win	42–1–1	Miguel Lora	UD	12	29 Oct 1988	Las Vegas Hilton Center, Las Vegas, Nevada, U.S.	Won WBC bantamweight title
43	Win	41–1–1	Wilfredo Vázquez	UD	10	1 Aug 1988	Great Western Forum, Inglewood, California, U.S.	
42	Win	40–1–1	Hilario Soto	KO	4 (?)	27 Jun 1988	San Luis Rio Colorado, Sonora, Mexico	
41	Win	39–1–1	Martin Lopez	KO	4	4 Apr 1988	Tijuana, Baja California, Mexico	
40	Win	38–1–1	Rodolfo Ortega	PTS	10	1 Feb 1988	Tijuana, Baja California, Mexico	
39	Win	37–1–1	Eduardo Torres	KO	1 (?)	7 Dec 1987	Arena Tijuana 72, Tijuana, Baja California, Mexico	
38	Win	36–1–1	Jorge Ramirez	PTS	10	12 Oct 1987	Tijuana, Baja California, Mexico	
37	Draw	35–1–1	Edel Geronimo	TD	3 (10), 0:26	10 Sep 1987	Sports Arena, Los Angeles, California, U.S.	
36	Win	35–1	Gaby Canizales	TKO	9 (?)	6 Jul 1987	Tijuana, Baja California, Mexico	
35	Win	34–1	Calvin Williams	KO	1 (?)	27 Apr 1987	Tijuana, Baja California, Mexico	
34	Win	33–1	Victor Moreno	KO	1 (10)	20 Mar 1987	Plaza de Tores Calafia, Mexicali, Baja California, Mexico	
33	Win	32–1	Antonio Escobar	KO	10 (10)	27 Jan 1987	Tijuana, Baja California, Mexico	
32	Win	31–1	James Manning	PTS	10	8 Dec 1986	Tijuana, Baja California, Mexico	
31	Win	30–1	Caprti Linkin	PTS	10	10 Nov 1986	Tijuana, Baja California, Mexico	
30	Win	29–1	Prudencio Cardona	PTS	10	30 Aug 1986	Tijuana, Baja California, Mexico	
29	Win	28–1	Miguel Pequeno	KO	3 (?)	8 Aug 1986	Tijuana, Baja California, Mexico	
28	Win	27–1	Diego Avila	PTS	10	18 Jul 1986	Tijuana, Baja California, Mexico	
27	Win	26–1	Eliseo Olivera	KO	2 (10)	16 Jun 1986	Arena Tijuana 72, Tijuana, Baja California, Mexico	
26	Loss	25–1	Roldolfo Ortega	PTS	10	3 May 1986	Mexico City, Distrito Federal, Mexico	
25	Win	25–0	Lucilo Nolasco	PTS	10	13 Mar 1986	Tijuana, Baja California, Mexico	
24	Win	24–0	Ubaldo Gonzalez	KO	1 (?)	24 Feb 1986	San Luis Rio Colorado, Sonora, Mexico	
23	Win	23–0	Lupe Torres	PTS	10	4 Feb 1986	La Paz, Baja California Sur, Mexico	
22	Win	22–0	Lucilo Nolasco	SD	10	10 Dec 1985	The Forum, Inglewood, California, U.S.	
21	Win	21–0	Juan Carlos Salazar	KO	7 (?)	25 Nov 1985	Tijuana, Baja California, Mexico	
20	Win	20–0	Elencio Mercedes	UD	10	23 Sep 1985	Plaza de Toros El Toreo, Tijuana, Baja California, Mexico	
19	Win	19–0	Enrique Aguilar	KO	9 (10)	12 Aug 1985	Tijuana, Baja California, Mexico	
18	Win	18–0	Pedro Rodriguez	KO	7 (?)	27 Jul 1985	Ensenada, Baja California, Mexico	
17	Win	17–0	Carlos de la Paz	KO	4 (?)	24 Jun 1985	Tijuana, Baja California, Mexico	
16	Win	16–0	Martin Garcia	KO	9 (10)	6 May 1985	Tijuana, Baja California, Mexico	
15	Win	15–0	Alberto Martinez	PTS	10	25 Mar 1985	Tijuana, Baja California, Mexico	
14	Win	14–0	Victor Moreno	KO	2 (?)	8 Mar 1985	Tijuana, Baja California, Mexico	
13	Win	13–0	Lupe Acosta	KO	4 (?)	1 Feb 1985	Tijuana, Baja California, Mexico	
12	Win	12–0	Canas Lozada	KO	6 (?)	6 Jan 1985	Tijuana, Baja California, Mexico	
11	Win	11–0	Jorge Cons	KO	3 (?)	10 Dec 1984	Tijuana, Baja California, Mexico	
10	Win	10–0	Antonio Flores	KO	4 (?)	21 Nov 1984	Tijuana, Baja California, Mexico	
9	Win	9–0	David Bautista	KO	6 (?)	27 Oct 1984	Mazatlan, Sinaloa, Mexico	
8	Win	8–0	Abraham Garcia	KO	4 (?)	1 Oct 1984	Tijuana, Baja California, Mexico	
7	Win	7–0	Jose Burbon	KO	4 (?)	13 Sep 1984	Tijuana, Baja California, Mexico	
6	Win	6–0	Estudiantes Ramirez	KO	3 (?)	29 Aug 1984	Tijuana, Baja California, Mexico	
5	Win	5–0	Rufino Logo	KO	3 (?)	17 Aug 1984	Tijuana, Baja California, Mexico	
4	Win	4–0	Zacarias Hernandez	KO	7 (?)	23 Jul 1984	Tijuana, Baja California, Mexico	
3	Win	3–0	Juan Jose Lopez	KO	4 (?)	10 Jun 1984	Tijuana, Baja California, Mexico	
2	Win	2–0	Roberto Garcia	PTS	4	12 May 1984	Tijuana, Baja California, Mexico	
1	Win	1–0	Jose Alvarado	KO	1 (?)	19 Mar 1984	Auditorio Municipal, Tijuana, Baja California, Mexico	

== Titles in boxing ==
=== Major world titles ===
- WBC bantamweight champion (118 lbs)
- WBA super bantamweight champion (122 lbs)

=== Regional/International titles ===
- WBC FECARBOX featherweight champion (126 lbs)

== See also ==
- List of Mexican boxing world champions
- List of world bantamweight boxing champions
- List of world super-bantamweight boxing champions

Sporting positions
World boxing titles
Preceded by Miguel Lora	WBC bantamweight champion 29 October 1988 – 25 February 1991	Succeeded by Greg Richardson
Preceded by Luis Mendoza	WBA super bantamweight champion 7 October 1991 – 27 March 1992	Succeeded by Wilfredo Vázquez
