= Park Yong-kyun =

South Korean boxer (born 1967)

Personal information
- Born: Park Yong-kyun; August 16, 1967 Seoul, South Korea
- Height: 1.70 m (5 ft 7 in)
- Weight: Featherweight

Boxing career
- Stance: Orthodox

Boxing record
- Total fights: 32
- Wins: 28
- Win by KO: 16
- Losses: 3
- Draws: 1

- Park Yong-kyun
- Hangul: 박영균
- Hanja: 朴永均
- RR: Bak Yeonggyun
- MR: Pak Yŏnggyun

Park Yong-kyun (born 16 August 1967) is a former Korean boxer. He was the WBA & Lineal Featherweight champion from 1991–1993.

Park is best known for his victories over Antonio Esparragoza and Eloy Rojas. Park also defeated Ever Beleno, Tae-Shik Chun, Seiji Asakawa, Masuaki Takeda, Thanomchit Kiatkriengkrai and Cris Saguid.

== Professional boxing record ==
32 fights	28 wins	3 losses
By knockout	16	0
By decision	12	3
Draws	1	

No.	Result	Record	Opponent	Type	Round, time	Date	Location	Notes
32	Loss	28–3–1	Eloy Rojas	SD	12	27 May 1995	Shinyang Park Hotel, Gwangju, South Korea	For WBA featherweight title
31	Win	28–2–1	Somsak Srichan	TKO	4 (10), 2:13	27 Aug 1994	Gangneung Gymnasium, Gangneung, South Korea	
30	Win	27–2–1	Miko Adalim	KO	5 (10), 1:44	21 May 1994	Dream Land, Seoul, South Korea	
29	Loss	26–2–1	Eloy Rojas	SD	12	4 Dec 1993	Gwangmyeong Gymnasium, Gwangmyeong, Soyth Korea	Lost WBA featherweight title
28	Win	26–1–1	Jun Tae-shik	UD	12	4 Sep 1993	Citizen Hall, Damyang, South Korea	Retained WBA featherweight title
27	Win	25–1–1	Thanomchit Kiatkriangkrai	TKO	2 (12), 2:58	20 Mar 1993	Halla Gymnasium, Jeju City, South Korea	Retained WBA featherweight title
26	Win	24–1–1	Ever Beleno	UD	12	19 Dec 1992	KBS Hall, Changwon, South Korea	Retained WBA featherweight title
25	Win	23–1–1	Giovanni Nieves	UD	12	29 Aug 1992	Hyundai Hotel, Gyeongju, South Korea	Retained WBA featherweight title
24	Win	22–1–1	Koji Matsumoto	TKO	11 (12), 0:45	25 Apr 1992	Olympic Hall, Ansan, South Korea	Retained WBA featherweight title
23	Win	21–1–1	Seiji Asakawa	KO	9 (12), 1:43	25 Jan 1992	Inchon Indoor Gymnasium, Incheon, South Korea	Retained WBA featherweight title
22	Win	20–1–1	Eloy Rojas	UD	12	14 Sep 1991	KBS Hall, Seoul, South Korea	Retained WBA featherweight title
21	Win	19–1–1	Masuaki Takeda	TKO	6 (12), 1:26	25 Jun 1991	Daegu Gymnasium, Daegu, South Korea	Retained WBA featherweight title
20	Win	18–1–1	Antonio Esparragoza	UD	12	30 Mar 1991	Mudeungsan Hotel, Gwangju, South Korea	Won WBA featherweight title
19	Win	17–1–1	Bonnie Balientos	TKO	3 (10), 1:49	2 Feb 1991	Sajik Gymnasium, Busan, South Korea	
18	Win	16–1–1	Cris Saguid	SD	12	10 Nov 1990	Cheju Indoor Gym, Jeju City, South Korea	Retained OPBF featherweight title
17	Win	15–1–1	Jimmy Sithfaidang	KO	2 (12), 1:34	21 Jul 1990	Gwangju, South Korea	Retained OPBF featherweight title
16	Win	14–1–1	Jojo Cayson	KO	8 (12), 1:35	21 Jan 1990	Munhwa Gymnasium, Seoul, South Korea	Won OPBF featherweight title
15	Win	13–1–1	Jun Young-man	PTS	10	29 Oct 1989	Daegu Gymnasium, Daegu, South Korea	Won vacant South Korean featherweight title
14	Win	12–1–1	Leon Collins	KO	9 (10), 0:10	8 Jul 1989	Daegu Gymnasium, Daegu, South Korea	
13	Loss	11–1–1	Choi Jae-won	UD	10	27 Nov 1988	Munhwa Gymnasium, Seoul, South Korea	Lost South Korean super-bantamweight title
12	Win	11–0–1	Park Young-duk	UD	10	17 Jul 1988	Munhwa Gymnasium, Seoul, South Korea	Won vacant South Korean super-bantamweight title
11	Draw	10–0–1	Park Jung-woo	PTS	10	31 Oct 1987	Iri Highschool, Iksan, South Korea	For South Korean super-bantamweight title
10	Win	10–0	Lee Jung-ho	KO	7 (8), 0:40	18 Jul 1987	Boeun Gymnasium, Boeun, South Korea	
9	Win	9–0	Kim Suk-bong	KO	3 (8), 2:10	6 Jun 1987	Hongcheon Highschool, Hongcheon, South Korea	
8	Win	8–0	Han Jae-chul	PTS	8	28 Mar 1987	Citizen Hall, Uijeongbu, South Korea	
7	Win	7–0	Nobuki Sato	KO	2 (6), 0:27	22 Feb 1937	Jamsil Gymnasium, Seoul, South Korea	
6	Win	6–0	Jo Woo-hyun	KO	1 (6), 2:45	7 Feb 1987	Munhwa Gymnasium, Seoul, South Korea	
5	Win	5–0	Jung Kyung-mo	PTS	6	28 Dec 1986	Jamsil Gymnasium, Seoul, South Korea	
4	Win	4–0	Kim In-shik	KO	2 (4), 1:25	21 Dec 1986	Jamsil Gymnasium, Seoul, South Korea	
3	Win	3–0	Kang Yong-duk	PTS	4	14 Dec 1986	Jamsil Gymnasium, Seoul, South Korea	
2	Win	2–0	Park Mun-chil	PTS	4	12 Dec 1986	Jamsil Gymnasium, Seoul, South Korea	
1	Win	1–0	Kim Hak-soo	KO	1 (4), 0:49	9 Dec 1986	Jamsil Gymnasium, Seoul, South Korea	

== See also ==
- Lineal championship
- List of Korean boxers

Sporting positions
World boxing titles
Preceded by Antonio Esparragoza	WBA Featherweight Champion; March 30, 1991 – December 4, 1993	Succeeded by Eloy Rojas
Preceded by Antonio Esparragoza	Lineal Featherweight Champion; March 30, 1991 – December 4, 1993	Succeeded by Eloy Rojas
