= Park Chan-yong (boxer) =

South Korean boxer (born 1963)

Chan-Young Park
Personal information
- Nationality: Korean
- Born: Chan Yong-Park; June 10, 1963 (age 63) Hwasun, Jeollanamdo, South Korea
- Height: 5 ft 6 in (1.68 m)
- Weight: Bantamweight; Super-bantamweight

Boxing career
- Stance: Orthodox

Boxing record
- Total fights: 40
- Wins: 33
- Win by KO: 16
- Losses: 5
- Draws: 2

Park Chan-yong (Korean: 박찬영; Hanja: 朴讃榮; born June 10, 1963 in Hwasun) is a South Korean former professional boxer who competed from 1980 to 1992. He held the WBA bantamweight title in 1987 and challenged for the WBC super-bantamweight title in 1989.

== Professional career ==
Park began his professional career in 1980. On May 24, 1987, after amassing a career record of 24–3–2 with 7 knockouts, Chan-yong was given the opportunity to challenge reigning bantamweight champion, Takuya Muguruma, for his WBA version of the world championship Mugurma's hometown of Moriguchi, Osaka, Japan. Park defeated Muguruma in the 11th round of 15 via technical knockout. Five months after he won the title, in his first title defense, he subsequently lost his championship on October 3, to Wilfredo Vázquez by technical knockout in the 10th round of 15.

After the defeat to Vázquez, Chan-yong moved up to the super-bantamweight division where after a four fight win streak, on December 3, 1989, he got another chance for a world title when he faced reigning WBC super-bantamweight champion of Mexico, Daniel Zaragoza for his championship in Incheon, South Korea. In his last chance to become a world champion again, Park put forth a great effort, losing the fight via split decision.

Chan-yong retired in 1992, after a string of knockout victories against lesser known fighters, ending his career with a record of 33–5–2 with 16 knockouts.

== Professional boxing record ==
| 40 fights | 33 wins | 5 losses |
|---|---|---|
| By knockout | 16 | 1 |
| By decision | 17 | 4 |
| Draws | 2 | |

| No. | Result | Record | Opponent | Type | Round | Date | Location | Notes |
|---|---|---|---|---|---|---|---|---|
| 40 | Win | 33–5–2 | Ronnie Quinto | KO | 2 (?) | Mar 31, 1992 | Municipal Sogo Gymnasium, Kitakyushu, Fukuoka, Japan | |
| 39 | Win | 32–5–2 | Edgar Padera | KO | 5 (?) | Dec 21, 1991 | Fukuoka, Japan | |
| 38 | Win | 31–5–2 | Rex Villaverde | KO | 1 (?) | Sep 23, 1991 | Kurume, Fukuoka, Japan | |
| 37 | Win | 30–5–2 | Al Balaba | TKO | 7 (?) | Apr 28, 1991 | Masan Gymnasium, Masan, South Korea | |
| 36 | Loss | 29–5–2 | Daniel Zaragoza | SD | 12 | Dec 3, 1989 | Sunin Gymnasium, Incheon, South Korea | For WBC super bantamweight title |
| 35 | Win | 29–4–2 | Alvaro Bohorquez | KO | 8 (10) | Aug 13, 1989 | Sunin Gymnasium, Incheon, South Korea | |
| 34 | Win | 28–4–2 | Carlos Castro | KO | 3 (10) | Apr 16, 1989 | Jeungpyeong, South Korea | |
| 33 | Win | 27–4–2 | Robby Rahangmetang | KO | 4 (10) | Nov 6, 1988 | Swiss Grand Hotel, Seoul, South Korea | |
| 32 | Win | 26–4–2 | Masakatsu Sakuma | TKO | 2 (10) | Mar 12, 1988 | Seoul, South Korea | |
| 31 | Loss | 25–4–2 | Wilfredo Vázquez | TKO | 10 (15) | Oct 4, 1987 | Hilton Hotel, Seoul, South Korea | Lost WBA bantamweight title |
| 30 | Win | 25–3–2 | Takuya Muguruma | TKO | 11 (15) | May 24, 1987 | City Gymnasium, Moriguchi, Osaka, Japan | Won WBA bantamweight title |
| 29 | Win | 24–3–2 | Little Bangoyan | PTS | 10 | Oct 19, 1986 | Seoul, South Korea | |
| 28 | Win | 23–3–2 | Norio Hasegawa | KO | 2 (10) | Feb 2, 1986 | Munhwa Gymnasium, Seoul, South Korea | |
| 27 | Win | 22–3–2 | Fel Malatag | KO | 10 (10) | Aug 25, 1985 | Munhwa Gymnasium, Seoul, South Korea | |
| 26 | Win | 21–3–2 | Edgar Apatan | PTS | 6 | Mar 31, 1985 | Seoul, South Korea | |
| 25 | Win | 20–3–2 | Ernie Cataluna | PTS | 10 | Dec 4, 1984 | Munhwa Gymnasium, Seoul, South Korea | |
| 24 | Win | 19–3–2 | Jorge Ramirez | PTS | 10 | Jul 8, 1984 | Munhwa Gymnasium, Seoul, South Korea | |
| 23 | Win | 18–3–2 | Lito Donayre | KO | 3 (10) | Jun 3, 1984 | Seoul, South Korea | |
| 22 | Win | 17–3–2 | Sakdisamai Chorsirirat | KO | 3 (10) | Feb 26, 1984 | Seoul, South Korea | |
| 21 | Win | 16–3–2 | Neptali Alamag | PTS | 10 | Nov 13, 1983 | Incheon Gymnasium, Incheon, South Korea | |
| 20 | Win | 15–3–2 | Sang Myun Choi | PTS | 8 | Oct 16, 1983 | Munhwa Gymnasium, Seoul, South Korea | |
| 19 | Loss | 14–3–2 | Khaosai Galaxy | PTS | 10 | Aug 3, 1983 | Bangkok, Thailand | |
| 18 | Win | 14–2–2 | Pablo Pepito | PTS | 10 | Jun 17, 1983 | Munhwa Gymnasium, Seoul, South Korea | |
| 17 | Win | 13–2–2 | Adan Uribe | PTS | 10 | Apr 10, 1983 | Seoul, South Korea | |
| 16 | Win | 12–2–2 | Daonoi Sithsane | KO | 7 (?) | Jan 18, 1983 | Seoul, South Korea | |
| 15 | Win | 11–2–2 | Suvan Silpaya | PTS | 10 | Oct 31, 1982 | Masan Gymnasium, Masan, South Korea | |
| 14 | Win | 10–2–2 | Flash Jagdon | PTS | 10 | Oct 3, 1982 | Seoul, South Korea | |
| 13 | Win | 9–2–2 | Chung Woo Chun | PTS | 6 | Aug 1, 1982 | Munhwa Gymnasium, Seoul, South Korea | |
| 12 | Win | 8–2–2 | Ryang Il Shin | KO | 6 (8) | May 30, 1982 | Munhwa Gymnasium, Seoul, South Korea | |
| 11 | Loss | 7–2–2 | Shoji Oguma | UD | 10 | Mar 24, 1982 | Korakuen Hall, Tokyo, Japan | |
| 10 | Draw | 7–1–2 | Sam Yong Kim | PTS | 6 | Jan 3, 1982 | Munhwa Gymnasium, Seoul, South Korea | |
| 9 | Win | 7–1–1 | Hyung Shik Ahn | PTS | 8 | Aug 13, 1981 | Gwangju Gymnasium, Gwangju City, South Korea | |
| 8 | Win | 6–1–1 | Bong Ho Lee | PTS | 8 | Jun 3, 1981 | Daegu Gymnasium, Daegu, South Korea | |
| 7 | Draw | 5–1–1 | Chan Joong Jun | PTS | 8 | Apr 4, 1981 | Chunchon Gymnasium, Chuncheon, South Korea | |
| 6 | Win | 5–1 | In Sup Bang | PTS | 8 | Jan 18, 1981 | Munhwa Gymnasium, Seoul, South Korea | |
| 5 | Loss | 4–1 | Kyung Soo Lee | PTS | 6 | Dec 7, 1980 | Munhwa Gymnasium, Seoul, South Korea | |
| 4 | Win | 4–0 | Hyung Shik Ahn | PTS | 4 | Nov 29, 1980 | Munhwa Gymnasium, Seoul, South Korea | |
| 3 | Win | 3–0 | Sang Myun Choi | PTS | 4 | Nov 23, 1980 | Munhwa Gymnasium, Seoul, South Korea | |
| 2 | Win | 2–0 | Sang Ho Choi | PTS | 4 | Nov 20, 1980 | Munhwa Gymnasium, Seoul, South Korea | |
| 1 | Win | 1–0 | Chang Sung Choi | KO | 3 (4) | Nov 18, 1980 | Munhwa Gymnasium, Seoul, South Korea | |

== See also ==
- List of Bantamweight boxing champions
- List of WBA world champions

| Preceded by Takuya Muguruma | WBA bantamweight champion May 24, 1987 – 1987 October 4, 1987 | Succeeded by Wilfredo Vazquez Sr. |
