= Eloy Rojas =

Venezuelan boxer

Personal information
- Born: Eloy David Rojas Leandro; 25 March 1967 Caracas, Venezuela
- Height: 1.68 m (5 ft 6 in)
- Weight: Featherweight

Boxing career
- Stance: Orthodox

Boxing record
- Total fights: 47
- Wins: 40
- Win by KO: 28
- Losses: 5
- Draws: 2

Eloy David Rojas Leandro (born 25 March 1967) is a Venezuelan former professional boxer in the Featherweight division.

Rojas turned pro in 1986 and won the WBA and Lineal Featherweight Titles in 1993 by defeating Yong-Kyun Park by decision. He defended the titles six times before losing them to Wilfredo Vazquez in 1996 via TKO in a fight which he was leading on all cards. Rojas never challenged for a world title again, and retired in 2005 after a loss to Herman Ngoudjo.

== See also ==
- Lineal championship

Sporting positions
World boxing titles
Preceded by Park Yong-kyun	WBA Featherweight Champion; 4 December 1993 – 18 May 1996	Succeeded by Wilfredo Vázquez
Preceded by Park Yong-kyun	Lineal Featherweight Champion; 4 December 1993 – 18 May 1996	Succeeded by Wilfredo Vázquez
