= Ray Minus =

Bahamian boxer (1964–2023)

Personal information
- Nationality: Bahamian
- Born: 3 July 1964 Nassau, Bahamas
- Died: 27 April 2023 (aged 58) Nassau, Bahamas
- Height: 5 ft 6 in (168 cm)
- Weight: bantam/super bantam/feather/super feather/light/light welterweight

Boxing career
- Reach: 63 1/2 in (161 cm)
- Stance: Orthodox

Boxing record
- Total fights: 48
- Wins: 37 (KO 27)
- Losses: 9 (KO 7)
- Draws: 1
- No contests: 1

Ray Minus (3 July 1964 – 27 April 2023) was a Bahamian professional bantam/super bantam/feather/super feather/light/light welterweight boxer of the 1980s, '90s and 2000s who won the Bahamas lightweight title, Bahamas light welterweight title, World Boxing Council (WBC) Continental Americas bantamweight title, World Boxing Association (WBA) Inter-Continental super bantamweight title, and Commonwealth bantamweight title, and was a challenger for the World Boxing Council (WBC) Continental Americas super bantamweight title against César Soto, World Boxing Council (WBC) Continental Americas lightweight title against Leavander Johnson, World Boxing Organization (WBO) bantamweight title against Israel Contreras, and International Boxing Federation (IBF) bantamweight title against Orlando Canizales, his professional fighting weight varied from 117 lb (53 kg; 8 st 5 lb), i.e. bantamweight to 140 lb (64 kg; 10 st 0 lb), i.e. light welterweight.

Minus died from amyotrophic lateral sclerosis on 27 April 2023, at the age of 58.
