= Orlando Fernandez (boxer) =

Puerto Rican boxer (born 1963)

Orlando Fernández
Personal information
- Born: January 18, 1963 (age 63) Yabucoa, Puerto Rico
- Height: 5 ft 4 in (163 cm)
- Weight: Super bantamweight; Featherweight

Boxing career
- Reach: 64 in (163 cm)
- Stance: Orthodox

Boxing record
- Total fights: 30
- Wins: 22
- Win by KO: 13
- Losses: 8

Orlando Fernandez (born January 18, 1963, in Yabucoa) is a former Puerto Rican professional boxer. He competed in the men's featherweight event at the 1984 Summer Olympics.

== Professional career ==
After turning professional in 1985, he would go to defeat former world champion Julio Gervacio by ninth-round knockout on December 15, 1989, then become WBO super bantamweight world champion on May 12, 1990, after stopping Valerio Nati in Italy. Fernandez lost his title in his fight against Jesse Benavides on May 24, 1991.

On July 14, 1996, Fernandez fought Marco Antonio Barrera for Barrera's WBO world Super Bantamweight title in Denver, Colorado, losing that fight by seventh-round knockout. He then retired after losing to Kevin Kelley in his next contest, by a tenth-round knockout on July 12, 1997, at Tunica, Mississippi.

== Professional boxing record ==
| 30 fights | 22 wins | 8 losses |
|---|---|---|
| By knockout | 13 | 2 |
| By decision | 9 | 6 |

| No. | Result | Record | Opponent | Type | Round, time | Date | Location | Notes |
|---|---|---|---|---|---|---|---|---|
| 30 | Loss | 22–8 | Kevin Kelley | KO | 10 (12) | 1997-07-12 | Sam's Town Casino, Tunica Resorts, Mississippi, U.S. | For WBU featherweight title |
| 29 | Loss | 22–7 | Marco Antonio Barrera | TKO | 7 (12) | 1996-07-14 | Mammoth Gardens, Denver, Colorado, U.S. | For WBO super-bantamweight title |
| 28 | Win | 22–6 | Leobardo Mancillas | RTD | 4 (?) | 1996-03-30 | Condado, Puerto Rico | |
| 27 | Win | 21–6 | Luis Enrique Valenzuela | TKO | 3 (10) | 1995-06-15 | Condado, Puerto Rico | |
| 26 | Win | 20–6 | Antonio Hernández | UD | 8 (8) | 1995-05-04 | Ponce, Puerto Rico | |
| 25 | Loss | 19–6 | Junior Jones | UD | 10 (10) | 1994-06-12 | Trump Plaza Hotel, Atlantic City, New Jersey, U.S. | |
| 24 | Win | 19–5 | Javier León | SD | 12 (12) | 1994-02-05 | Jai Alai Fronton, Miami, Florida, U.S. | Won vacant WBC FECARBOX featherweight title |
| 23 | Win | 18–5 | Tomas Valdez | KO | 7 (10) | 1993-10-15 | Yabucoa, Puerto Rico | |
| 22 | Win | 17–5 | Tony Wehbee | SD | 12 (12) | 1993-04-22 | Workers Club, Revesby, New South Wales, Australia | Retained WBF super-bantamweight title |
| 21 | Win | 16–5 | Felix Camacho | UD | 12 (12) | 1992-12-09 | San Juan, Puerto Rico | Won WBF super-bantamweight title |
| 20 | Win | 15–5 | Rafael Meran | TKO | 9 (10) | 1992-10-16 | Santo Domingo, Dominican Republic | |
| 19 | Win | 14–5 | Felix Camacho | UD | 10 (10) | 1992-09-04 | Isla Verde, Puerto Rico | |
| 18 | Loss | 13–5 | Carlos Uribe | UD | 10 (10) | 1992-06-07 | Teatro Monumental, Santiago, Chile | |
| 17 | Win | 13–4 | Nelson Rodriguez | PTS | 10 (10) | 1991-11-04 | San Juan, Puerto Rico | |
| 16 | Loss | 12–4 | Jesse Benavides | UD | 12 (12) | 1991-05-24 | Memorial Coliseum, Corpus Christi, Texas, U.S. | Lost WBO super-bantamweight title |
| 15 | Loss | 12–3 | Miguel Juarez | PTS | 10 (10) | 1990-11-03 | Centro Internacional Acapulco, Acapulco, Mexico | |
| 14 | Win | 12–2 | Valerio Nati | TKO | 10 (12) | 1990-05-12 | Sassari Arena, Sassari, Italy | Won WBO super-bantamweight title |
| 13 | Win | 11–2 | Julio Gervacio | KO | 9 (?) | 1989-12-15 | Yabucoa, Puerto Rico | |
| 12 | Loss | 10–2 | Ki Joon Lee | PTS | 10 (10) | 1989-06-17 | Sangju Gymnasium, Sangju, South Korea | |
| 11 | Win | 10–1 | Luis Rodriguez | KO | 2 (?) | 1988-12-09 | Santo Domingo, Dominican Republic | |
| 10 | Win | 9–1 | Atiliano Quinones | TKO | 6 (10) | 1988-10-08 | Caguas, Puerto Rico | |
| 9 | Win | 8–1 | Mario Cordero | TKO | 2 (?) | 1988-05-13 | Sands Hotel & Casino, San Juan, Puerto Rico | |
| 8 | Loss | 7–1 | Daniel Londas | PTS | 8 (8) | 1988-02-05 | Pointe-à-Pitre, Guadeloupe | |
| 7 | Win | 7–0 | Javier Pichardo | MD | 10 (10) | 1987-11-20 | Aragon Ballroom, Chicago, Illinois, U.S. | |
| 6 | Win | 6–0 | Jose Chevere | TKO | 2 (?) | 1987-03-14 | San Juan, Puerto Rico | |
| 5 | Win | 5–0 | Norgie Castro | KO | 1 (6) | 1986-06-22 | Hiram Bithorn Stadium, San Juan, Puerto Rico | |
| 4 | Win | 4–0 | Carlos Saez | PTS | 4 (4) | 1986-05-24 | Roberto Clemente Coliseum, San Juan, Puerto Rico | |
| 3 | Win | 3–0 | Jesus Cruz | TKO | 2 (4) | 1985-08-03 | Cayey, Puerto Rico | |
| 2 | Win | 2–0 | Angel Rosario | SD | 4 (4) | 1985-03-30 | Santurce, Puerto Rico | |
| 1 | Win | 1–0 | Orlando Santiago | TKO | 3 (4) | 1985-02-23 | Hato Rey, Puerto Rico | |

== See also ==
- Boxing in Puerto Rico
- List of Puerto Rican boxing world champions
- List of world super-bantamweight boxing champions

Sporting positions
Regional boxing titles
| Vacant Title last held by Glenn Ford | WBC FECARBOX featherweight champion February 5, 1994 – 1994; Vacated | Vacant Title next held by Victor Polo |
Minor world boxing titles
| Preceded by Felix Camacho | WBF super-bantamweight champion December 9, 1992 – 1994; Vacated | Vacant Title next held by Tony Wehbee |
Major world boxing titles
| Preceded by Valerio Nati | WBO super-bantamweight champion May 12, 1990 – May 24, 1991 | Succeeded by Jesse Benavides |
