= Yoddamrong Sithyodthong =

Thai boxer (1981–2011)

Personal information
- Nickname: Oh
- Born: Damrong Kongsuk; February 15, 1981 Uthai Thani, Thailand
- Died: September 3, 2011 (aged 30) Queen Savang Vadhana Memorial Hospital, Si Racha, Chonburi, Thailand
- Height: 168 cm (5 ft 6 in)
- Weight: Super-bantamweight; Featherweight

Boxing career

Boxing record
- Total fights: 51
- Wins: 43
- Win by KO: 18
- Losses: 7
- Draws: 1

Yoddamrong Sithyodthong (Thai: ยอดดำรงค์ ศิษย์ยอดธง; February 15, 1981 – September 3, 2011), also known as Yoddamrong Singwangcha (Thai: ยอดดำรงค์ สิงห์วังชา), was a Thai professional boxer who competed from 1996 to 2007 and held the WBA super-bantamweight title in 2002.

== Biography and career ==
Born in Uthai Thani province in upper central Thailand, Yoddamrong who was nicknamed Oh, used to fight Muay Thai before with grand master Yodtong "Kru Tui" Senanan as a trainer.

When switching to professional he was under the stable of popular promoter Songchai Rattanasuban.

He was short-lived as the world champion after over 12 rounds with Yober Ortega the Venezuelan title holder in Nakhon Ratchasima province on February 21, 2002. After that, he lost it immediately in the first defense in Saitama, Japan with the local challenger Osamu Sato on May 18, the same year. He lost by knockout in the eighth round. Yoddamrong is regarded as Thailand's 32nd world champion, but is the shortest reigning the title at just two months and 27 days. He is considered the first Thai to win the championship in this weight class and this organization before Somsak Sithchatchawal in 2006 and Poonsawat Kratingdaenggym in 2009.

He also had the opportunity to challenge the world champion again in same weight class with the French-Iranian holder Mahyar Monshipour on November 8, 2004, in Paris, France, but was defeated by knockout in the sixth round.

Before retiring in 2007, he had lost twice to fellow Thai the undefeated Chonlatarn Piriyapinyo in 2006 and the following year for ABCO featherweight champion.

== Life after boxing and death ==
After leaving the boxing industry, he worked as a truck driver for a brand of energy drink. He lived alone with his wife at the rental room in Bang Lamung, Chonburi province, his wife native. He was suffering from chronic lung disease from heavy smoking. Yoddamrong had an accident with his head hitting the floor in the bathroom on September 1, 2011, and two days later, at 4:40 pm, he died at the age of 30.

== See also ==
- List of WBA world champions
- List of world super-bantamweight boxing champions
