= Felix Camacho =

Felix Camacho may refer to:

- Felix Perez Camacho (born 1957), American politician and businessman
- Felix Camacho (boxer) (born 1966), Puerto Rican boxer
