= Valerio Nati =

Italian boxer (born 1956)

Personal information
- Born: 11 April 1956 (age 70) Dovadola, Emilia-Romagna, Italy
- Height: 5 ft 5 in (165 cm)
- Weight: Bantamweight; Super bantamweight; Featherweight

Boxing career
- Stance: Orthodox

Boxing record
- Total fights: 55
- Wins: 46
- Win by KO: 28
- Losses: 5
- Draws: 4

Valerio Nati (born April 11, 1956 in Dovadola, Italy) is a former Italian professional boxer. He was the World Boxing Organization's world Super Bantamweight champion.

== Professional career ==
Nati turned professional in 1978 under the management of Giorgio Bonetti. He won the Italian bantamweight title from Giuseppe Fossati in his 11th fight in 1979, and the vacant European Bantamweight title in a bout against Juan Francisco Rodríguez the following year.

Between 1981 and 1982, Nati defended his title five times in matches against Vicente Rodriguez, John Feeney, Jean-Jacques Souris, Luis De La Sagra, and Esteban Eguia. However, he struggled to get down to 118 lbs. for his fight with Fossati in 1982 and lost the title to his rival. A rematch with Fossati the following year was fought to a draw.

In 1983, Nati lost two matches for the European Boxing Union Featherweight title. The following year, Bonetti retired and Nati chose Umberto Branchini as his new manager. Between 1984 and 1987 Nati racked up 14 consecutive victories to get another shot at the European Featherweight title, which he won against Marc Amand in two rounds. After six more victories, he had a World Boxing Council Super Bantamweight title opportunity against Daniel Zaragoza, but was knocked out in the 5th round. He rebounded from the loss, challenging World Boxing Organization Super Bantamweight champion Kenny Mitchell and winning by disqualification. Nati lost in his first defense of the WBO title to Puerto Rican Orlando Fernandez, and eventually retired in 1991. From 2012 to 2014 he was a part of the World Series of Boxing Dolce & Gabbana Milano Thunder team that won the 2011–2012 World Championship in London.

== Professional boxing record ==
55 fights	46 wins	5 losses
By knockout	28	3
By decision	16	2
By disqualification	2	0
Draws	4	

No.	Result	Record	Opponent	Type	Round, time	Date	Location	Notes
55	Win	46–5–4	Esteban Perez Quinones	TKO	4 (?)	1991-08-17	Boville Ernica, Italy	
54	Loss	45–5–4	Orlando Fernandez	TKO	10 (12)	1990-05-12	Palasport Roberta Serradimigni, Sassari, Italy	Lost WBO super-bantamweight title
53	Win	45–4–4	Kenny Mitchell	DQ	4 (12)	1989-12-09	Teramo, Italy	Won WBO super-bantamweight title
52	Win	44–4–4	Ignacio Martinez	TKO	2 (?)	1989-09-29	Forlì, Italy	
51	Win	43–4–4	Dean Lynch	TKO	6 (8)	1989-05-12	Lodi, Italy	
50	Loss	42–4–4	Daniel Zaragoza	KO	5 (12)	1988-11-26	Palazzo dello sport, Forlì, Italy	For WBC super-bantamweight title
49	Win	42–3–4	Jose Gallegos	TKO	5 (?)	1988-06-04	Cagliari, Italy	
48	Win	41–3–4	Ricky West	KO	2 (?)	1988-02-27	Roberto Clemente Coliseum, San Juan, Puerto Rico	
47	Win	40–3–4	Jose Hernandez	TKO	1 (?)	1987-11-22	Trezzano sul Naviglio, Italy	
46	Win	39–3–4	Vincenzo Limatola	DQ	7 (12)	1987-07-24	Silvi, Italy	Retained European featherweight title
45	Win	38–3–4	Carlos Segura	KO	1 (?)	1987-05-22	Jesi, Italy	
44	Win	37–3–4	Marc Amand	TKO	2 (12)	1987-03-13	Forlì, Italy	Won vacant European featherweight title
43	Win	36–3–4	Chris Diaz	TKO	7 (?)	1986-10-10	Carisport, Cesena, Italy	
42	Win	35–3–4	Sonny Long	PTS	8 (8)	1986-06-20	Paris, France	
41	Win	34–3–4	John Farrell	PTS	8 (8)	1986-04-26	Palazzo Dello Sport, Lucca, Italy	
40	Win	33–3–4	Steve Cleak	TKO	4 (10)	1986-02-14	Milan, Italy	
39	Win	32–3–4	Danny Lee	TKO	2 (8)	1985-12-26	Modena, Italy	
38	Win	31–3–4	Rubén Darío Palacio	PTS	10 (10)	1985-10-12	Carisport, Cesena, Italy	
37	Win	30–3–4	Luis de la Sagra	TKO	3 (?)	1985-07-09	Forlì, Italy	
36	Win	29–3–4	Billy Hardy	TKO	4 (?)	1985-06-07	Scandicci, Italy	
35	Win	28–3–4	Julio Garcia	KO	1 (?)	1985-04-12	Forlì, Italy	
34	Win	27–3–4	Ley Umba Sengi	PTS	8 (8)	1985-03-01	Forlì, Italy	
33	Win	26–3–4	Maurizio Lupino	PTS	8 (8)	1984-10-06	Carrara, Italy	
32	Win	25–3–4	Manuel Santos	PTS	8 (8)	1984-07-02	Milan, Italy	
31	Win	24–3–4	Orlando Maldonado	TKO	5 (10)	1984-05-26	Mets Pavilion, Guaynabo, Puerto Rico	
30	Win	23–3–4	Vicente Fernandez	TKO	5 (?)	1984-04-13	Milan, Italy	
29	Loss	22–3–4	Barry McGuigan	KO	6 (12)	1983-11-16	King's Hall, Belfast, Northern Ireland, U.K.	For vacant European featherweight title
28	Loss	22–2–4	Loris Stecca	PTS	12 (12)	1983-08-05	Camaiore, Italy	For European featherweight title
27	Draw	22–1–4	Richard Saka	PTS	8 (8)	1983-06-03	Portoferraio, Italy	
26	Draw	22–1–3	Giuseppe Fossati	PTS	12 (12)	1983-02-24	Bologna, Italy	For European bantamweight title
25	Win	22–1–2	Mariano García	TKO	1 (10)	1983-01-05	Ischia, Italy	
24	Draw	21–1–2	Richard Saka	PTS	8 (8)	1982-11-10	Sassari, Italy	
23	Loss	21–1–1	Giuseppe Fossati	PTS	12 (12)	1982-04-28	Lignano Sabbiadoro, Italy	Lost European bantamweight title
22	Win	21–0–1	Esteban Eguía	TKO	5 (12)	1982-01-27	Castrocaro Terme e Terra del Sole, Italy	Retained European bantamweight title
21	Win	20–0–1	Luis de la Sagra	PTS	12 (12)	1981-11-19	Campobello di Mazara, Italy	Retained European bantamweight title
20	Win	19–0–1	Jean Jacques Souris	TKO	2 (12)	1981-09-02	Stintino, Italy	Retained European bantamweight title
19	Win	18–0–1	John Feeney	PTS	12 (12)	1981-06-17	Cervia, Italy	Retained European bantamweight title
18	Win	17–0–1	Vicente Rodriguez	KO	5 (12)	1981-04-01	Rome, Italy	Retained European bantamweight title
17	Win	16–0–1	Dominique Cesari	PTS	8 (8)	1981-02-14	Sassari, Italy	
16	Win	15–0–1	Juan Francisco Rodríguez	PTS	12 (12)	1980-12-03	Forlì, Italy	Won vacant European bantamweight title
15	Win	14–0–1	Antonio Luis Franca	TKO	5 (?)	1980-08-06	Silvi, Italy	
14	Win	13–0–1	Josias Melquiades	PTS	8 (8)	1980-05-31	Sassari, Italy	
13	Win	12–0–1	Franco Buglione	TKO	3 (12)	1980-04-24	Forlì, Italy	Retained Italian bantamweight title
12	Win	11–0–1	Claudio Tanda	KO	1 (?)	1980-03-15	Forlì, Italy	
11	Win	10–0–1	Giuseppe Fossati	UD	12 (12)	1979-11-30	Forlì, Italy	Won Italian bantamweight title
10	Draw	9–0–1	Heleno Ferreira	PTS	8 (8)	1979-10-11	Faenza, Italy	
9	Win	9–0	Luigi Tessarin	PTS	8 (8)	1979-06-08	Ravenna, Italy	
8	Win	8–0	Abdelkader Esmain	PTS	8 (8)	1979-04-14	Forlì, Italy	
7	Win	7–0	Nessim Zebelini	PTS	8 (8)	1978-12-26	PalaDozza, Bologna, Italy	
6	Win	6–0	Salvatore Laconi	TKO	3 (8)	1978-11-03	Forlì, Italy	
5	Win	5–0	Giulio Greco	KO	5 (?)	1978-10-21	Palazzo Dello Sport, Pesaro, Italy	
4	Win	4–0	Domenico Palumbo	TKO	3 (?)	1978-07-19	Municipal Stadium, Bellaria – Igea Marina, Italy	
3	Win	3–0	Antonio Luis Franca	TKO	4 (?)	1978-07-06	Lugo, Italy	
2	Win	2–0	Luigi Paravati	TKO	2 (?)	1978-05-19	Forlì, Italy	
1	Win	1–0	Domenico Palumbo	PTS	6 (6)	1978-04-07	Faenza, Italy	

== See also ==
- List of world super-bantamweight boxing champions

Sporting positions
Regional boxing titles
Preceded by Giuseppe Fossati	Italian bantamweight champion November 30, 1979 – 1980; Vacated	Vacant Title next held by Giuseppe Fossati
Vacant Title last held by Johnny Owen	European bantamweight champion December 3, 1980 – April 28, 1982	Succeeded by Giuseppe Fossati
Vacant Title last held by Jim McDonnell	European featherweight champion March 13, 1987 – 1988; Vacated	Vacant Title next held by Jean-Marc Renard
World boxing titles
Preceded by Kenny Mitchell	WBO super-bantamweight champion December 9, 1989 – May 12, 1990	Succeeded by Orlando Fernandez
