= Jesus Salud =

American boxer (born 1963)

Personal information
- Nickname: The Hawaiian Punch
- Nationality: American
- Born: Jesus Yagin Salud; May 3, 1963 (age 63) Sinait, Ilocos Sur, Philippines
- Height: 5 ft 6 in (168 cm)
- Weight: Bantamweight; Super bantamweight

Boxing career
- Reach: 65 in (165 cm)
- Stance: Orthodox

Boxing record
- Total fights: 76
- Wins: 63
- Win by KO: 38
- Losses: 13

Jesus Salud (born 3 May 1963) is a Filipino-born American former professional boxer who held the World Boxing Association (WBA) super bantamweight title from 1989 to 1990. Salud also captured the NABF title four times, as well as the WBO & IBC titles. Originally from Sinait in the Philippines, he resides in Honolulu, Hawaii After moving there at the age of 7. He grew up in the small community of Nānākuli on the leeward coastline of Oahu.

== Professional career ==
Salud began his career in Honolulu, Hawaii fighting out of the Waipahu gym under coach Al Silva. At a young age he fought in the local PAL boxing league, Golden Gloves and would go on to fight in the Junior Olympics. After fighting over 100 amateur fights, he made his pro boxing debut in 1983. Salud started his professional boxing career with a 20-0 record and eventually relocate with his family to San Diego at the beginning of 1989. In the year alone he fought 7 times, going undefeated while capturing the NABF title and eventually landing a world title fight for the WBA title.

He won the WBA super bantamweight title by disqualification on December 11, 1989, in a bout against Juan Jose Estrada. Salud was dominating the fight sending Estrada to the canvas multiple times when a string of intentional low blows from Estrada out of frustration was the cause for the disqualification. Salud was later stripped of his title by the World Boxing Association in April 1990. The WBA took Salud’s belt away for failing to defend it in Colombia against the No. 1 contender, Luis Mendoza. The controversial situation was due to the political climate in Colombia, where at the time it was unsafe due to the social involvement of the Colombian cartel that was led by Pablo Escobar. The U.S. government advised Salud's team that it was unsafe leading them to ultimately make the decision to refuse the bout and attempt to push for the fight in at a neutral location.

After being stripped of the WBA title, Salud would bounce back, becoming a 4 time NABF champion and winning the IBC & WBO titles along the way throughout his career fighting around the world. He would fight his 76th professional bout in 2002 before eventually retiring that year. Throughout the years, Salud fought the best fighters from the Bantamweight and featherweight division in that era from the likes of Marco Antonio Barrera, Kevin Kelly and Kennedy McKinney to name a few. During his career, Salud fought bouts under iconic boxing promoter Don King and the late Dr. Jerry Buss. Salud was once courted by Sylvester Stallone to be under his management early in his boxing career during the height of Stallones's "Rocky" fame run. Salud was a part of many boxing camps in southern California that included other world boxing champions like The Norris Brothers(Orlin & Terry), Oscar De La Hoya, Floyd Mayweather and Lennox Lewis.

A short time after retirement in late 2002, Salud was contacted by world renowned Boxing trainer Freddy Roach for an exhibition bout in Honolulu with his up and coming fighter and then-two division champion Manny Pacquiao. The two fighters exchanged punches in front of a full house at the Stan Sheriff arena for three rounds to the fans delight.

== Professional boxing record ==
76 fights	63 wins	13 losses
By knockout	38	4
By decision	24	9
By disqualification	1	0

No.	Result	Record	Opponent	Type	Round, time	Date	Location	Notes
76	Loss	63–13	William Abelyan	UD	10	Apr 27, 2002	Cox Convention Center, Oklahoma City, Oklahoma, U.S.	
75	Loss	63–12	Juan Carlos Ramírez	UD	10	Feb 15, 2002	Plaza de Toros, Ciudad Juárez, Mexico	
74	Win	63–11	Frangky Mamuaya	TKO	5 (10), 1:14	Dec 12, 2001	Civic Auditorium, Hilo, Hawaii, U.S.	
73	Loss	62–11	Fernando Orlando Velárdez	TKO	8 (10), 0:41	May 15, 2001	Convention Center, Honolulu, Hawaii, U.S.	
72	Loss	62–10	Marco Antonio Barrera	RTD	6 (12), 3:00	Dec 1, 2000	Venetian Hotel & Casino, Paradise, Nevada, U.S.	For WBO super bantamweight title
71	Win	62–9	Jorge Munoz	UD	8	Nov 5, 2000	Pepsi Arena, Chula Vista, California, U.S.	
70	Win	61–9	Kasmana Silehu	TKO	3 (10), 2:22	May 25, 2000	Neal S. Blaisdell Arena, Honolulu, Hawaii, U.S.	
69	Win	60–9	Amador Vasquez	UD	10	Apr 26, 1999	Arrowhead Pond, Anaheim, California, U.S.	
68	Win	59–9	Frangky Mamuaya	TKO	5 (10), 2:44	Dec 8, 1998	Neal S. Blaisdell Arena, Honolulu, Hawaii, U.S.	
67	Win	58–9	David Vazquez	TKO	2 (10), 2:28	Sep 14, 1998	Great Western Forum, Inglewood, California, U.S.	
66	Win	57–9	Kris Wuritimur	KO	5 (12), 2:51	Feb 24, 1998	Neal S. Blaisdell Arena, Honolulu, Hawaii, U.S.	Won WBO Asia Pacific super bantamweight title
65	Win	56–9	Sairung Suwansil	TKO	2 (10), 0:33	Nov 6, 1997	Neal S. Blaisdell Arena, Honolulu, Hawaii, U.S.	
64	Win	55–9	Manuel Arellano	TKO	2 (?)	Sep 1, 1997	Tijuana, Baja California, Mexico	
63	Loss	54–9	Kevin Kelley	UD	12	Mar 14, 1997	Pepsi Arena, Albany, New York, U.S.	For WBF featherweight title
62	Win	54–8	Guty Espadas Jr.	UD	10	Dec 3, 1996	Fantasy Springs Resort Casino, Indio, California, U.S.	
61	Loss	53–8	Vuyani Bungu	UD	12	Aug 20 1996	Carousel Casino, Hammanskraal, South Africa	For IBF super bantamweight title
60	Win	53–7	Michael Gallatti	TKO	4 (10), 2:01	May 31, 1996	Neal S. Blaisdell Arena, Honolulu, Hawaii, U.S.	
59	Win	52–7	Jose Luis Montes	TKO	8 (10), 1:42	Apr 9, 1996	Grand Hotel, Tijuana, Mexico	
58	Win	51–7	Jose Luis Meza	KO	3 (?)	Feb 26, 1996	Tijuana, Baja California, Mexico	
57	Loss	50–7	Antonio Cermeño	UD	12	Nov 26, 1995	Coliseo El Limon, Maracay, Venezuela	For WBA super bantamweight title
56	Win	50–6	Benito Rodriguez	TKO	10 (10), 0:52	Apr 1, 1995	Buffalo Bill's Star Arena, Primm, Nevada, U.S.	
55	Win	49–6	Cesar Decena	TKO	6 (10), 0:20	Nov 17, 1994	Neal S. Blaisdell Arena, Honolulu, Hawaii, U.S.	
54	Win	48–6	Juan Valencia	RTD	10 (12)	May 19, 1994	Neal S. Blaisdell Arena, Honolulu, Hawaii, U.S.	Retained NABF super bantamweight title
53	Win	47–6	Juan Francisco Soto	UD	10	Apr 21, 1994	Swiss Park, Chula Vista, California, U.S.	
52	Win	46–6	Max Gomez	UD	12	Feb 18, 1994	Sports Arena, San Diego, California, U.S.	Retained NABF super bantamweight title
51	Loss	45–6	Kennedy McKinney	UD	12	Oct 16, 1993	Caesars Tahoe, Stateline, Nevada, U.S.	For IBF super bantamweight title
50	Win	45–5	Troy Fletcher	TKO	1 (10), 2:37	Jul 17, 1993	The Pyramid, Memphis, Tennessee, U.S.	
49	Win	44–5	Miguel Molina	TKO	1 (12), 2:25	Mar 30, 1993	Sports Arena, San Diego, California, U.S.	Retained NABF super bantamweight title
48	Win	43–5	Jesus Poll	TKO	10 (10), 2:11	Nov 11, 1992	Sports Arena, San Diego, California, U.S.	
47	Win	42–5	Rudy Zavala	TKO	8 (12), 2:16	Jul 23, 1992	Sports Arena, San Diego, California, U.S.	Won NABF super bantamweight title
46	Loss	41–5	Welcome Ncita	UD	12	Apr 18, 1992	Palazzetto dello Sport, Treviolo, Italy	For IBF super bantamweight title
45	Win	41–4	Pablo Valenzuela	TKO	5 (10), 2:07	Dec 17, 1991	Neal S. Blaisdell Arena, Honolulu, Hawaii, U.S.	
44	Win	40–4	Darryl Pinckney	UD	12	Sep 14, 1991	Memorial Center, Maui, Hawaii, U.S.	Won NABF super bantamweight title
43	Win	39–4	Vicente Gonzalez	UD	10	Jul 5, 1991	Del Mar Fairgrounds, Del Mar, California, U.S.	
42	Win	38–4	Diego Avila	UD	10	May 31, 1991	Bloch Arena, Honolulu, Hawaii, U.S.	
41	Win	37–4	Idelfonso Bernal	KO	2 (10), 1:22	Feb 21, 1991	Sheraton Waikiki Hotel, Honolulu, Hawaii, U.S.	
40	Win	36–4	Hector Diaz	TKO	7 (10), 2:53	Dec 10, 1990	Tijuana, Baja California, Mexico	
39	Win	35–4	Francisco Valdez	TKO	6 (10), 1:01	Oct 22, 1990	Great Western Forum, Inglewood, California, U.S.	Fight stopped due to a severe cut
38	Win	34–4	Martin Ortegon	TKO	11 (12)	Jun 7, 1990	Neal S. Blaisdell Arena, Honolulu, Hawaii, U.S.	Won IBC super bantamweight title
37	Loss	33–4	Jesse Benavides	MD	10	Mar 25, 1990	Memorial Coliseum, Corpus Christi, Texas, U.S.	
36	Win	33–3	Roberto Granciosa	UD	10	Feb 2, 1990	Neal S. Blaisdell Arena, Honolulu, Hawaii, U.S.	
35	Win	32–3	Juan José Estrada	DQ	9 (12), 0:48	Dec 11, 1989	Great Western Forum, Inglewood, California, U.S.	Won WBA super bantamweight title
34	Win	31–3	Hector Diaz	UD	10	Nov 8, 1989	Neal S. Blaisdell Arena, Honolulu, Hawaii, U.S.	
33	Win	30–3	Eduardo Lopez	UD	10	Oct 19, 1989	El Cortez Hotel, San Diego, California, U.S.	
32	Win	29–3	Freddie Santos	UD	10	Jul 20, 1989	El Cortez Hotel, San Diego, California, U.S.	
31	Win	28–3	Gilberto Contreras	KO	2 (12), 2:08	May 25, 1989	Ward Field, Honolulu, Hawaii, U.S.	Retained NABF super bantamweight title
30	Win	27–3	Carlos Salinas	TKO	1 (10), 1:59	Apr 20, 1989	El Cortez Hotel, San Diego, California, U.S.	
29	Win	26–3	Ramiro Adames	KO	2 (12), 0:57	Feb 28, 1989	Great Western Forum, Inglewood, California, U.S.	Won NABF super bantamweight title
28	Win	25–3	Carlos Castro	TKO	3 (10)	Jan 19, 1989	El Cortez Hotel, San Diego, California, U.S.	
27	Loss	24–3	Carlos Romero	SD	10	Jul 27, 1988	Great Western Forum, Inglewood, California, U.S.	
26	Win	24–2	Yong Woon Park	UD	10	Jun 16, 1988	Great Western Forum, Inglewood, California, U.S.	
25	Win	23–2	Kirk Harris	KO	8 (10), 1:34	Apr 21, 1988	Great Western Forum, Inglewood, California, U.S.	
24	Loss	22–2	Mario Gomez	TKO	5 (10), 2:08	Sep 3, 1987	Great Western Forum, Inglewood, California, U.S.	Fight stopped due to a broken collarbone injury
23	Win	22–1	Allan Makitoki	UD	10	Feb 24, 1987	Sheraton Waikiki Hotel, Honolulu, Hawaii, U.S.	
22	Win	21–1	Edel Geronimo	UD	10	Nov 18, 1986	Neal S. Arena, Honolulu, Hawaii, U.S.	
21	Loss	20–1	Frankie Duarte	RTD	9 (12)	Jul 10, 1986	Great Western Forum, Inglewood, California, U.S.	For NABF bantamweight title
20	Win	20–0	Kenny Mitchell	SD	10	Apr 21, 1986	Great Western Forum, Inglewood, California, U.S.	
19	Win	19–0	Mike Phelps	TKO	10 (10), 1:22	Feb 10, 1986	Great Western Forum, Inglewood, California, U.S.	
18	Win	18–0	Hugo Partida	TKO	1 (10), 2:59	Dec 10, 1985	Neal S. Blaisdell Arena, Honolulu, Hawaii, U.S.	
17	Win	17–0	Roberto Ramirez	TKO	8 (10), 1:40	Jul 23, 1985	Neal S. Blaisdell Arena, Honolulu, Hawaii, U.S.	
16	Win	16–0	Joe Hiyas	UD	10	Jun 11, 1985	Neal S. Blaisdell Arena, Honolulu, Hawaii, U.S.	
15	Win	15–0	Pedro Rodriguez	TKO	8 (10), 1:24	May 1, 1985	Neal S. Blaisdell Arena, Honolulu, Hawaii, U.S.	
14	Win	14–0	Jeff Hanna	TKO	7 (10), 2:19	Mar 19, 1985	Neal S. Blaisdell Arena, Honolulu, Hawaii, U.S.	
13	Win	13–0	Jose Salas	TKO	4 (10), 1:57	Feb 12, 1985	Neal S. Blaisdell Arena, Honolulu, Hawaii, U.S.	
12	Win	12–0	Alfred Rangel	SD	10	Jan 22, 1985	Neal S. Blaisdell Arena, Honolulu, Hawaii, U.S.	
11	Win	11–0	Troy Townsend	UD	8	Nov 20, 1984	Neal S. Blaisdell Arena, Honolulu, Hawaii, U.S.	
10	Win	10–0	Adolfo Lopez	UD	6	Oct 16, 1984	Neal S. Blaisdell Arena, Honolulu, Hawaii, U.S.	
9	Win	9–0	Gerald Issack	TKO	4 (8)	Sep 4, 1984	Neal S. Blaisdell Arena, Honolulu, Hawaii, U.S.	
8	Win	8–0	Donny Brooks	UD	8	Aug 14, 1984	Neal S. Blaisdell Arena, Honolulu, Hawaii, U.S.	
7	Win	7–0	John Norman	TKO	5 (6), 1:29	May 22, 1984	Neal S. Blaisdell Arena, Honolulu, Hawaii, U.S.	
6	Win	6–0	Kali Muhammad	UD	6	Apr 17, 1984	Neal S. Blaisdell Arena, Honolulu, Hawaii, U.S.	
5	Win	5–0	Anthony Henry	TKO	3 (6)	Feb 15, 1984	Neal S. Blaisdell Arena, Honolulu, Hawaii, U.S.	
4	Win	4–0	Randy Dudoit	UD	6	Nov 22, 1983	Neal S. Blaisdell Arena, Honolulu, Hawaii, U.S.	
3	Win	3–0	Robert Nunez	PTS	5	Oct 4, 1983	Neal S. Blaisdell Arena, Honolulu, Hawaii, U.S.	
2	Win	2–0	Juan Rodriguez	KO	3 (4)	Aug 23, 1983	Neal S. Blaisdell Arena, Honolulu, Hawaii, U.S.	
1	Win	1–0	Cesar Zulueta	KO	2 (4), 2:36	Jun 28, 1983	Neal S. Blaisdell Arena, Honolulu, Hawaii, U.S.	

== Exhibition boxing record ==
1 fight	0 wins	1 loss
By decision	0	1

No.	Result	Record	Opponent	Type	Round, time	Date	Location	Notes
1	Loss	0–1	(Philippines) Manny Pacquiao	PTS	3	Aug 20, 2002	(United States) Neal S. Blaisdell Arena, Honolulu, Hawaii, U.S.	

== See also ==
- List of Filipino boxing world champions
- List of world super-bantamweight boxing champions

Sporting positions
Regional boxing titles
Preceded by Jesus Poll	NABF super bantamweight champion February 28, 1989 – 1989; Vacated	Vacant Title next held by Tracy Harris Patterson
Preceded by Darryl Pinckney	NABF super bantamweight champion September 14, 1991 – 1991; Vacated	Vacant Title next held by Rudy Zavala
Preceded by Rudy Zavala	NABF super bantamweight champion July 23, 1992 – 1993; Vacated	Vacant Title next held by Jesse Benavides
Vacant Title last held by Jesse Benavides	NABF super bantamweight champion February 18, 1994 – 1994; Vacated	Vacant Title next held by Erik Morales
World boxing titles
Preceded by Juan José Estrada	WBA super bantamweight champion December 11, 1989 – April 5, 1990; Stripped	Vacant Title next held by Luis Mendoza
