= Suh Sung-in =

Korean male boxer

Personal information
- Nationality: South Korean
- Born: July 18, 1959 (age 66) Seoul, South Korea
- Weight: Super bantamweight

Boxing career
- Stance: Orthodox

Boxing record
- Total fights: 27
- Wins: 22
- Win by KO: 9
- Losses: 5

- Suh Sung-in
- Hangul: 서성인
- RR: Seo Seongin
- MR: Sŏ Sŏngin

Suh Sung-in (Korean: 서성인; born July 18, 1959, in Seoul, South Korea) is a former bantamweight world champion boxer from South Korea.

== Pro career ==
In 1984, Suh became the IBF Super Bantamweight champion by beating Bobby Berna via a tenth-round TKO. He defended his title once before losing it to Kim Ji-won by a tenth-round KO in 1985.

Preceded by Bobby Berna	IBF Super Bantamweight Champion; 15 April 1984 – 3 January 1985	Succeeded by Kim Ji-won
