= Jesse Benavides =

American boxer

Personal information
- Born: November 8, 1963 (age 62) Corpus Christi, Texas, U.S.
- Height: 5 ft 4 in (163 cm)
- Weight: Super bantamweight; Featherweight

Boxing career
- Reach: 65 in (165 cm)
- Stance: Southpaw

Boxing record
- Total fights: 46
- Wins: 40
- Win by KO: 25
- Losses: 5
- Draws: 1

Jesse Benavides (born November 8, 1963, in Corpus Christi, Texas) is an American former professional boxer.

== Amateur career ==
Jesse Benavides was the 1981 National AAU (106lbs) Light Flyweight Champion and 1983 National USA/ABF (119lbs) Bantamweight Champion. Jesse Benavides was a four time Texas State Golden Gloves Champion. Jesse was the 1981 (106lbs) Light Flyweight National Golden Gloves Champion, the 1982 (112lbs) Flyweight National Golden Gloves Champion, and the 1983 (119lbs) Bantamweight National Golden Gloves Champion. Jesse was also the 1981 National Sports Festival (106lbs) Light Flyweight Champion, and the National Sports Festival (112lbs) Flyweight National Champion. Jesse was the 1983 (119lbs) Bantamweight North America Champion and competed in the 1983 World Cup in Rome, Italy. Jesse Benavides was runner up at the 1984 U.S. Olympic Trials.

== Professional career ==
Jesse Benavides began his Professional career in 1984 under manager Emanuel Steward's Kronk Gym and was trained by Tony Ayala Sr. Jesse won his first professional title, the United States Boxing Association (USBA) 122-lbs Championship, on 11/20/1987. On 05/24/1991, Jesse Benavides, won the WBO 122-lbs super bantamweight world championship, with a win over Orlando Fernandez of Puerto Rico. Jesse defended the belt once before losing it in London, England to Duke McKenzie in 1992. On 05/21/1993 Jesse Benavides won the North American Boxing Federation (NABF) 122 lbs. Championship and earned a title fight against Tracy Harris Patterson. Benavides loss a close unanimous decision. He also loss a close decision to Kevin Kelly for the WBC Featherweight Title in 1994. Benavides retired in 1996 after a KO loss to Marco Antonio Barrera for the WBO super bantamweight title.

== Professional boxing record ==
| 46 fights | 40 wins | 5 losses |
|---|---|---|
| By knockout | 25 | 2 |
| By decision | 15 | 3 |
| Draws | 1 | |

| No. | Result | Record | Opponent | Type | Round, time | Date | Location | Notes |
|---|---|---|---|---|---|---|---|---|
| 46 | Loss | 40–5–1 | Marco Antonio Barrera | KO | 3 (12) | 1996-05-04 | Arrowhead Pond, Anaheim, California, U.S. | For WBO super-bantamweight title |
| 45 | Win | 40–4–1 | Hector Ulises Chong | UD | 10 (10) | 1995-09-23 | JohnnyLand, Corpus Christi, Texas, U.S. | |
| 44 | Win | 39–4–1 | Roberto Villareal | UD | 10 (10) | 1995-05-28 | Convention Center, South Padre Island, Texas, U.S. | |
| 43 | Win | 38–4–1 | Manuel Avila | UD | 10 (10) | 1995-02-18 | Expo Center, Kingsville, Texas, U.S. | |
| 42 | Loss | 37–4–1 | Kevin Kelley | UD | 12 (12) | 1994-05-06 | Boardwalk Hall, Atlantic City, New Jersey, U.S. | For WBC featherweight title |
| 41 | Win | 37–3–1 | Jesús Sarabia | UD | 12 (12) | 1993-12-08 | Callaghan Plaza, San Antonio, Texas, U.S. | Retained NABF super-bantamweight title |
| 40 | Win | 36–3–1 | Ramiro Valero | KO | 1 (?) | 1993-07-19 | Marriott Riverwalk, San Antonio, Texas, U.S. | |
| 39 | Win | 35–3–1 | Runnell Doll | RTD | 5 (12) | 1993-05-21 | Tarrant County Convention Center, Fort Worth, Texas, U.S. | Won vacant NABF super-bantamweight title |
| 38 | Loss | 34–3–1 | Tracy Harris Patterson | UD | 12 (12) | 1993-03-13 | McCann Arena, Poughkeepsie, New York, U.S. | For WBC super-bantamweight title |
| 37 | Loss | 34–2–1 | Duke McKenzie | UD | 12 (12) | 1992-10-15 | Lewisham Theatre, London, England, U.K. | Lost WBO super-bantamweight title |
| 36 | Draw | 34–1–1 | Efrain Pintor | TD | 2 (10) | 1992-03-21 | Waco, Texas, U.S. | |
| 35 | Win | 34–1 | Fernando Ramos | TKO | 5 (12) | 1991-08-30 | Memorial Coliseum, Corpus Christi, Texas, U.S. | Retained WBO super-bantamweight title |
| 34 | Win | 33–1 | Orlando Fernandez | UD | 12 (12) | 1991-05-24 | Memorial Coliseum, Corpus Christi, Texas, U.S. | Won WBO super-bantamweight title |
| 33 | Win | 32–1 | Rafael Ortega | UD | 10 (10) | 1991-01-25 | Memorial Coliseum, Corpus Christi, Texas, U.S. | |
| 32 | Win | 31–1 | Diego Avila | UD | 10 (10) | 1990-08-13 | Memorial Coliseum, Corpus Christi, Texas, U.S. | |
| 31 | Win | 30–1 | Kelvin Seabrooks | TKO | 1 (12) | 1990-05-13 | Memorial Coliseum, Corpus Christi, Texas, U.S. | Retained USBA super-bantamweight title |
| 30 | Win | 29–1 | Jesus Salud | MD | 10 (10) | 1990-03-25 | Memorial Coliseum, Corpus Christi, Texas, U.S. | |
| 29 | Win | 28–1 | José Luis Soto | UD | 10 (10) | 1990-02-06 | New Daisy Theatre, Memphis, Tennessee, U.S. | |
| 28 | Win | 27–1 | Gary Spencer | TKO | 5 (10) | 1989-11-17 | Memorial Hall, Kansas City, Kansas, U.S. | |
| 27 | Win | 26–1 | Daniel Garcia | TKO | 9 (12) | 1989-04-28 | Holiday Inn Holidome, Tucson, Arizona, U.S. | Retained USBA super-bantamweight title |
| 26 | Win | 25–1 | Jeff Hanna | TKO | 3 (10) | 1988-12-15 | Convention Center, Tucson, Arizona, U.S. | |
| 25 | Win | 24–1 | Diego Briones Herrera | TKO | 4 (10) | 1988-11-23 | Convention Center, Tucson, Arizona, U.S. | |
| 24 | Win | 23–1 | Richard Abila | UD | 10 (10) | 1988-10-02 | Freeman Coliseum, San Antonio, Texas, U.S. | |
| 23 | Loss | 22–1 | Pedro Rubén Décima | TKO | 3 (10) | 28 Jul 1988 | Caesars Palace, Paradise, Nevada, U.S. | |
| 22 | Win | 22–0 | James Pipps | TKO | 2 (12) | 1988-05-28 | George R. Brown Convention Center, Houston, Texas, U.S. | Retained USBA super-bantamweight title |
| 21 | Win | 21–0 | Greg Richardson | SD | 12 (12) | 1987-11-20 | Sands Casino Hotel, Atlantic City, New Jersey, U.S. | Won USBA super-bantamweight title |
| 20 | Win | 20–0 | Mike Moreno | KO | 4 (10) | 1987-10-31 | Arizona Veterans Memorial Coliseum, Phoenix, Arizona, U.S. | |
| 19 | Win | 19–0 | Hugo Partida | TKO | 4 (10) | 1987-09-25 | Holiday Inn Holidome, Tucson, Arizona, U.S. | |
| 18 | Win | 18–0 | Arturo Tebaqui | TKO | 3 (10) | 1987-08-15 | Freeman Coliseum, San Antonio, Texas, U.S. | |
| 17 | Win | 17–0 | Hector Cortez | TKO | 5 (10) | 1987-05-29 | Cobo Arena, Detroit, Michigan, U.S. | |
| 16 | Win | 16–0 | John Boyd | TKO | 10 (10) | 1987-03-10 | Memorial Coliseum, Corpus Christi, Texas, U.S. | |
| 15 | Win | 15–0 | David Johnson | UD | 10 (10) | 1986-08-23 | Memorial Coliseum, Corpus Christi, Texas, U.S. | |
| 14 | Win | 14–0 | Antonio Escobar | TKO | 6 (10) | 1986-07-28 | Grahams Studio West, Phoenix, Arizona, U.S. | |
| 13 | Win | 13–0 | Alvaro Rosquero | KO | 2 (10) | 1986-06-15 | Memorial Coliseum, Corpus Christi, Texas, U.S. | |
| 12 | Win | 12–0 | Gerardo Velasquez | KO | 1 (8) | 1986-05-11 | Memorial Coliseum, Corpus Christi, Texas, U.S. | |
| 11 | Win | 11–0 | Eugenio Morgan | TKO | 3 (?) | 1986-02-10 | Laughlin, Nevada, U.S. | |
| 10 | Win | 10–0 | Juan Armienta | TKO | 1 (10) | 1985-12-13 | Fiesta Plaza Mall, San Antonio, Texas, U.S. | |
| 9 | Win | 9–0 | Eddie Petty | TKO | 3 (8) | 1985-10-24 | Cobo Arena, Detroit, Michigan, U.S. | |
| 8 | Win | 8–0 | Eddie Gonzalez | TKO | 2 (8) | 1985-09-25 | Memorial Coliseum, Corpus Christi, Texas, U.S. | |
| 7 | Win | 7–0 | Pedro Rodriguez | UD | 8 (8) | 1985-07-10 | Memorial Coliseum, Corpus Christi, Texas, U.S. | |
| 6 | Win | 6–0 | Rogelio Leanos | TKO | 6 (8) | 1985-05-21 | Memorial Coliseum, Corpus Christi, Texas, U.S. | |
| 5 | Win | 5–0 | Adolfo Lopez | MD | 6 (6) | 1985-03-31 | Riverside Resort Hotel & Casino, Laughlin, Nevada, U.S. | |
| 4 | Win | 4–0 | Agustin Soberanes | UD | 4 (4) | 1985-02-08 | Caesars Tahoe, Stateline, Nevada, U.S. | |
| 3 | Win | 3–0 | Bobby Adams | TKO | 3 (6) | 1985-01-31 | Cobo Arena, Detroit, Michigan, U.S. | |
| 2 | Win | 2–0 | Ray Espinoza | KO | 2 (6) | 1984-11-14 | Cobo Arena, Detroit, Michigan, U.S. | |
| 1 | Win | 1–0 | Tommy Valdez | KO | 1 (6) | 1984-09-27 | Memorial Coliseum, Corpus Christi, Texas, U.S. | |

== Awards ==
Jesse Benavides won the Outstanding Boxer Award of the 1982 Golden Gloves National Tournament, in 1983 Benavides was the winner of the Sullivan Award for Amateur Boxer Of the Year. In 1991 Jesse Benavides was honored to be named the recipient of the Congressional Hispanic Caucus, Medallion of Excellence Award, for Role Model of the Year in Washington DC. Jesse also was awarded WBO Fight Of The Year in 1991 at the WBO Convention.

== See also ==
- Kronk Gym
- List of southpaw stance boxers
- List of Mexican boxing world champions
- List of world super-bantamweight boxing champions

Sporting positions
Amateur boxing titles
| Previous: Robert Shannon | U.S. light-flyweight champion 1981 | Next: Mario Lesperance |
| Previous: Ronnie Rentz | Golden Gloves flyweight champion 1982 | Next: Todd Hickman |
| Previous: Meldrick Taylor | Golden Gloves bantamweight champion 1983 | Next: Robert Shannon |
| Previous: Floyd Favors | U.S. bantamweight champion 1983 | Next: Eugene Speed |
Regional boxing titles
| Preceded by Greg Richardson | USBA super-bantamweight champion November 20, 1987 – May 24, 1991; Won world title | Vacant Title next held by Sugar Baby Rojas |
| Vacant Title last held by Jesus Salud | NABF super-bantamweight champion May 21, 1993 – 1994; Vacated | Vacant Title next held by Jesus Salud |
World boxing titles
| Preceded by Orlando Fernandez | WBO super-bantamweight champion May 24, 1991 – October 15, 1992 | Succeeded by Duke McKenzie |
