= Bobby Berna =

Filipino boxer (born 1961)

Personal information
- Nationality: Filipino
- Born: Roberto Bernaldez; May 19, 1961 (age 65) Quezon City, Philippines
- Height: 5 ft 6 in (168 cm)
- Weight: Bantamweight; Super bantamweight

Boxing career
- Reach: 67 in (170 cm)
- Stance: Southpaw

Boxing record
- Total fights: 38
- Wins: 31
- Win by KO: 17
- Losses: 6
- Draws: 1

Bobby Berna (born May 19, 1961 in the Philippines) is a retired Filipino boxer.

== Professional career ==
After turning professional in 1979 he had compiled a record of 23-2-1 in 4 years before travelling to Los Angeles in 1983 to challenge Jaime Garza for the vacant WBC super bantamweight title. He was stopped by Garza in the second round and missed out on the opportunity to become champion. He rebounded by beating Suh Sung-in for the newly created IBF's inaugural super bantamweight championship. He would lose the title in his first defense in a rematch to Suh four months later. He had his final title shot against Kim Ji-Won but was unsuccessful, and he retired from the sport in 1988.

== See also ==
- List of super-bantamweight boxing champions
- List of Filipino boxing world champions

Achievements
Inaugural Champion	IBF Super Bantamweight Champion; December 4, 1983 – April 15, 1984	Succeeded by Suh Sung-in
