= Osamu Sato (boxer) =

Japanese boxer

Osamu Sato 佐藤 修
Personal information
- Nickname: Hulk
- Born: December 16, 1976 (age 49) Kobe, Hyōgo, Japan
- Height: 5 ft 7 in (170 cm)
- Weight: Super bantamweight; Featherweight

Boxing career
- Reach: 68 in (173 cm)
- Stance: Orthodox

Boxing record
- Total fights: 32
- Wins: 26
- Win by KO: 15
- Losses: 3
- Draws: 3

Osamu Sato (佐藤 修, Satō Osamu; born December 16, 1976) is a Japanese former professional boxer from Kobe, Hyogo, Japan.

== Professional career ==
Sato became the WBA super bantamweight champion of the world when he defeated Thai champion Yoddamrong Sithyodthong in 2002 via a 8th-round knockout. He lost the title in his next fight again French contender Salim Medjkoune. He retired in 2004 at the age of 26.

== Professional boxing record ==
32 fights	26 wins	3 losses
By knockout	15	1
By decision	11	2
Draws	3	

No.	Result	Record	Opponent	Type	Round, time	Date	Location	Notes
32	Loss	26–3–3	Chris John	UD	12 (12)	2004-06-04	Ariake Coliseum, Tokyo, Japan	For WBA featherweight title
31	Win	26–2–3	Dae Kyung Park	KO	2 (10)	2003-12-15	Korakuen Hall, Tokyo, Japan	
30	Draw	25–2–3	Yokthai Sithoar	SD	10 (10)	2003-07-21	Korakuen Hall, Tokyo, Japan	
29	Loss	25–2–2	Salim Medjkoune	UD	12 (12)	2002-10-09	Yoyogi National Gymnasium, Tokyo, Japan	Lost WBA super-bantamweight title
28	Win	25–1–2	Yoddamrong Sithyodthong	KO	8 (12)	2002-05-18	Super Arena, Saitama, Japan	Won WBA super-bantamweight title
27	Draw	24–1–2	Willie Jorrín	MD	12 (12)	2002-02-05	Ariake Coliseum, Tokyo, Japan	For WBC super-bantamweight title
26	Win	24–1–1	Vichit Chuwatana	TKO	11 (12)	2001-09-17	Korakuen Hall, Tokyo, Japan	Retained OBPF super-bantamweight title
25	Win	23–1–1	Manopchai Singmanasak	KO	6 (10)	2001-06-18	Korakuen Hall, Tokyo, Japan	
24	Win	22–1–1	Yong In Jo	UD	12 (12)	2001-04-16	Korakuen Hall, Tokyo, Japan	Won OBPF super-bantamweight title
23	Win	21–1–1	Kyong Soo Chung	KO	4 (10)	2000-09-18	Korakuen Hall, Tokyo, Japan	
22	Win	20–1–1	Jun Magsipoc	UD	8 (8)	2000-06-11	Ariake Coliseum, Tokyo, Japan	
21	Win	19–1–1	Yun Chul Yuh	TKO	4 (10)	2000-04-17	Korakuen Hall, Tokyo, Japan	
20	Win	18–1–1	Maximo Barro	TKO	5 (8)	2000-03-21	Japan	
19	Win	17–1–1	Nikolay Eremeev	SD	10 (10)	1999-12-20	Japan	
18	Win	16–1–1	Hitoshi Nema	TKO	7 (10)	1999-10-18	Korakuen Hall, Tokyo, Japan	
17	Win	15–1–1	Tetsuro Inoue	TKO	5 (8)	1999-06-27	Ariake Coliseum, Tokyo, Japan	
16	Win	14–1–1	Jack Carte	TKO	1 (10)	1999-05-17	Korakuen Hall, Tokyo, Japan	
15	Win	13–1–1	Edwin Gastador	SD	10 (10)	1999-03-15	Korakuen Hall, Tokyo, Japan	
14	Win	12–1–1	Yasushi Arai	TKO	7 (10)	1999-01-18	Korakuen Hall, Tokyo, Japan	
13	Win	11–1–1	Tatsuya Tojo	TKO	7 (8)	1998-11-16	Japan	
12	Win	10–1–1	Shinobu Hirado	UD	8 (8)	1998-07-20	Japan	
11	Win	9–1–1	Wataru Matsumoto	PTS	6 (6)	1998-05-18	Korakuen Hall, Tokyo, Japan	
10	Win	8–1–1	Yusuke Inoue	PTS	6 (6)	1998-03-02	Korakuen Hall, Tokyo, Japan	
9	Draw	7–1–1	Nobuhisa Coronita Doi	PTS	4 (4)	1997-09-29	Japan	
8	Win	7–1	Koji Suzuki	TKO	3 (4)	1997-08-29	Japan	
7	Win	6–1	Kazuhito Saito	KO	4 (4)	1997-07-01	Japan	
6	Win	5–1	Tetsushi Asayama	PTS	4 (4)	1997-05-02	Japan	
5	Loss	4–1	Gen Ichihashi	KO	2 (4)	1996-08-19	Japan	
4	Win	4–0	Kojiro Ebina	PTS	4 (4)	1996-07-15	Japan	
3	Win	3–0	Hiroyuki Yoneshige	PTS	4 (4)	1996-02-19	Japan	
2	Win	2–0	Michio Harasawa	KO	2 (4)	1995-11-20	Japan	
1	Win	1–0	Kazunori Osato	PTS	4 (4)	1995-09-25	Nippon Budokan, Tokyo, Japan	

== See also ==
- Boxing in Japan
- List of Japanese boxing world champions
- List of world super-bantamweight boxing champions

Sporting positions
Regional boxing titles
Preceded by Yong In Jo	OBPF super-bantamweight champion April 16, 2001 – 2001; Vacated	Vacant Title next held by Yong In Jo
World boxing titles
Preceded by Yoddamrong Sithyodthong	WBA super-bantamweight champion May 18, 2002 – October 9, 2002	Succeeded by Salim Medjkoune
