= Lee Ryol-li =

Zainichi Korean boxer (born 1982)

- Born: May 20, 1982 (age 44); Kadoma, Osaka, Japan
- Native name: Ri Retsuri (李 冽理, Japanese); Lee Yol-Li (이 열리 in South Korean); Lee Ryol-Li (리 렬리 in North Korean)
- Nationality: (North Korea) North Korean
- Height: 5 ft 8.5 in (1.74 m)
- Division: Super bantamweight Featherweight
- Reach: 68 in (173 cm)
- Fighting out of: Yokohama, Kanagawa, Japan
- Team: Yokohama Hikari Gym
- Years active: 2005–2013

Professional boxing record
- Total: 26
- Wins: 20
- By knockout: 10
- Losses: 4
- Draws: 2

Other information
- University: Korea University
- Last updated on: October 2, 2010

Lee Ryol-li (born May 20, 1982), or Retsuri Lee, is a Japanese-born North Korean retired professional boxer. He was born in Kadoma, Osaka, and lives in Yokohama, Kanagawa.

== Biography ==
Lee won his first fight by third-round KO in 2005. He won the Japanese featherweight title in 2010, and defended the title once before fighting for a world title.

He captured the WBA super bantamweight title against Thai Poonsawat Kratingdaenggym on October 2, 2010 at Korakuen Hall, Tokyo, Japan. He earned a 5 million yen bonus for the fight.

Lee is also affiliated with Chongryon, or the General Association of Korean Residents in Japan, a group of ethnic Koreans in Japan that is sympathetic to North Korea.

== See also ==
- List of WBA world champions
- List of super bantamweight boxing champions

Sporting positions
World boxing titles
Preceded by Poonsawat Kratingdaenggym	WBA super-bantamweight champion Regular title October 2, 2010 – December 10, 2010; Promoted	Vacant Title next held by Scott Quigg
Vacant Title last held by Celestino Caballero	WBA super-bantamweight champion December 10, 2010 – January 31, 2011	Succeeded by Akifumi Shimoda
