= Juan José Estrada (boxer) =

Mexican boxer

Personal information
- Nickname: Dinamita
- Born: November 28, 1963 Tijuana, Baja California, Mexico
- Died: June 21, 2015 (aged 51) Tijuana, Baja California, Mexico
- Weight: Bantamweight; Super bantamweight

Boxing career
- Stance: Orthodox

Boxing record
- Total fights: 47
- Wins: 36
- Win by KO: 30
- Losses: 11

Juan José Estrada (November 28, 1963 – June 21, 2015) was a Mexican professional boxer in the Super Bantamweight division. He was the WBA Super Bantamweight Champion.

== Professional career ==
In December 1987, Estrada won the WBC International title by stopping veteran Raul Payo Valdez in the tenth round.

=== WBA Super Bantamweight Championship ===
On May 28, 1988, Estrada won the WBA Super Bantamweight title by upsetting Bernardo Piñango over twelve rounds. He would defend the title three times against Takuya Muguruma, Jesus Poll & future champion Luis Mendoza. Estraded would lose the title to Filipino challenger Jesus Salud via disqualification in 1989.

== Professional boxing record ==
47 fights	36 wins	11 losses
By knockout	30	4
By decision	6	6
By disqualification	0	1

No.	Result	Record	Opponent	Type	Round, time	Date	Location	Notes
47	Loss	36–11	Francisco Váldez	TKO	4 (?)	1994-05-13	Tijuana, Mexico	
46	Loss	36–10	José Méndez	PTS	10 (10)	1991-02-27	Mexico City, Mexico	
45	Loss	36–9	Joe Orewa	UD	10 (10)	1990-04-07	Hilton Hotel, Winchester, Nevada, U.S.	
44	Loss	36–8	Jesus Salud	DQ	9 (12)	1989-12-11	The Forum, Inglewood, California, U.S.	Lost WBA super-bantamweight title
43	Win	36–7	Luis Mendoza	UD	12 (12)	1989-07-10	Auditorio Municipal, Tijuana, Mexico	Retained WBA super-bantamweight title
42	Win	35–7	Jesus Poll	KO	10 (12)	1989-04-04	The Forum, Inglewood, California, U.S.	Retained WBA super-bantamweight title
41	Win	34–7	Takuya Muguruma	TKO	11 (12)	1988-10-16	City Gymnasium, Moriguchi, Japan	Retained WBA super-bantamweight title
40	Win	33–7	Bernardo Piñango	SD	12 (12)	1988-05-28	Plaza de Toros, Tijuana, Mexico	Won WBA super-bantamweight title
39	Win	32–7	Luisito Espinosa	TKO	10 (12)	1988-03-14	Tijuana, Mexico	Retained WBC International bantamweight title
38	Win	31–7	Raul Valdez	TD	10 (12)	1987-12-07	Arena Tijuana 72, Tijuana, Mexico	Won WBC International bantamweight title
37	Loss	30–7	Alberto Dávila	TD	3 (10)	1987-11-03	The Forum, Inglewood, California, U.S.	
36	Loss	30–6	Lucilo Nolasco	TKO	7 (10)	1987-09-10	Sports Arena, Los Angeles, California, U.S.	
35	Win	30–5	Azael Moran	KO	2 (10)	1987-06-22	Tijuana, Mexico	
34	Win	29–5	Jose Luis Cruz	KO	3 (?)	1987-05-18	Tijuana, Mexico	
33	Win	28–5	Miguel Angel Cota	KO	4 (10)	1987-03-20	Plaza de Toros Calafia, Mexicali, Mexico	
32	Win	27–5	Edel Geronimo	UD	10 (10)	1987-02-03	The Forum, Inglewood, California, U.S.	
31	Win	26–5	Koheita Tanaka	KO	4 (?)	1986-12-08	Tijuana, Mexico	
30	Win	25–5	Rodolfo Ortega	KO	6 (?)	1986-10-27	Tijuana, Mexico	
29	Loss	24–5	Lucio Omar Lopez	PTS	10 (10)	1986-09-06	Estadio Luna Park, Buenos Aires, Argentina	
28	Loss	24–4	Jorge Ramírez	PTS	12 (12)	1986-06-16	Arena Tijuana 72, Tijuana, Mexico	
27	Win	24–3	Lupe Torres	TKO	8 (?)	1986-04-25	Tijuana, Mexico	
26	Win	23–3	Alejandro Flores	KO	5 (?)	1986-03-17	Tijuana, Mexico	
25	Win	22–3	Manuel Aguilar	TKO	9 (?)	1985-12-06	Tijuana, Mexico	
24	Loss	21–3	Manuel Aguilar	TKO	2 (?)	1985-10-14	Tijuana, Mexico	
23	Win	21–2	Ramon Jimenez	KO	4 (10)	1985-09-23	Plaza de Toros El Toreo, Tijuana, Mexico	
22	Win	20–2	Antonio Escobar	PTS	10 (10)	1985-07-27	Ensenada, Mexico	
21	Win	19–2	Jose Angel Cazares	TKO	2 (?)	1985-06-11	Tijuana, Mexico	
20	Win	18–2	Ron Cisneros	UD	10 (10)	1985-05-16	Olympic Auditorium, Los Angeles, California, U.S.	
19	Win	17–2	Felipe Mojica	KO	6 (?)	1985-04-22	Tijuana, Mexico	
18	Win	16–2	Martin Dominguez	KO	2 (?)	1985-03-14	Ensenada, Mexico	
17	Win	15–2	Pedro Rodriguez	TKO	10 (?)	1985-03-08	Tijuana, Mexico	
16	Win	14–2	Julio Valle	TKO	9 (?)	1985-02-11	Tijuana, Mexico	
15	Loss	13–2	Alberto Martínez	PTS	10 (10)	1984-12-10	Tijuana, Mexico	
14	Win	13–1	Angel Felix	TKO	3 (?)	1984-11-19	Tijuana, Mexico	
13	Win	12–1	Ubaldo Gonzalez	TKO	4 (?)	1984-10-01	Tijuana, Mexico	
12	Win	11–1	Alvino Aguilar	KO	2 (?)	1984-08-14	Tijuana, Mexico	
11	Win	10–1	Salvador Canedo	KO	6 (?)	1984-07-03	Tijuana, Mexico	
10	Win	9–1	Guadalupe Rubio	KO	2 (?)	1984-05-29	Tijuana, Mexico	
9	Loss	8–1	Salvador Canedo	TKO	2 (8)	1984-03-27	Auditorio Municipal, Tijuana, Mexico	
8	Win	8–0	Secundino Millan	KO	2 (?)	1984-03-05	Auditorio Municipal, Tijuana, Mexico	
7	Win	7–0	Jaime Martinez	TKO	2 (?)	1984-01-18	Tijuana, Mexico	
6	Win	6–0	Jose Alvarado	KO	1 (?)	1983-12-19	Ensenada, Mexico	
5	Win	5–0	Fausto Mendoza	KO	1 (?)	1983-11-28	Tijuana, Mexico	
4	Win	4–0	Jose Maytorena	KO	1 (?)	1983-10-29	Tijuana, Mexico	
3	Win	3–0	Jorge DeAlva	KO	1 (?)	1983-09-26	Tijuana, Mexico	
2	Win	2–0	Jaime Fraile	KO	1 (?)	1983-08-30	Tijuana, Mexico	
1	Win	1–0	Victor Cuevas	KO	1 (4)	1983-08-07	Arena Tijuana 72, Tijuana, Mexico	

== Death ==
On June 21, 2015, Estrada was stabbed to death in what is believed to be a family dispute, he was 51.

== See also ==
- List of Mexican boxing world champions
- List of world super-bantamweight boxing champions

Sporting positions
Regional boxing titles
Preceded by Raul Valdez	WBC International bantamweight champion December 7, 1987 – May 28, 1988; Won world title	Vacant Title next held by Wongso Indrajit
World boxing titles
Preceded by Bernardo Piñango	WBA super-bantamweight champion May 28, 1988 – December 11, 1989	Succeeded by Jesus Salud
