= List of world super-bantamweight boxing champions =

This is a list of world super-bantamweight boxing champions, as recognized by the four major sanctioning organizations in boxing:

- The World Boxing Association (WBA), established in 1921 as the National Boxing Association (NBA). The WBA often recognize up to two world champions in a given weight class; Super champion and Regular champion.
- The World Boxing Council (WBC), established in 1963.
- The International Boxing Federation (IBF), established in 1983.
- The World Boxing Organization (WBO), established in 1988.

== World ==
Reign Began	Reign Ended	Champion	Recognition
Title inaugurated
1922-09-21	1923-08-29	(United States) Jack "Kid" Wolfe	NYSAC
1923-08-29	1923-11-Vacated	(United States) Carl Duane	NYSAC

== WBC ==
Reign Began	Reign Ended	Champion	Recognition
Title inaugurated
1976-04-03	1976-10-09	(Panama) Rigoberto Riasco	WBC
1976-10-09	1976-11-24	(Japan) Royal Kobayashi	WBC
1976-11-24	1977-05-21	(South Korea) Yum Dong-kyun	WBC
1977-05-21	1983-Vacated	(Puerto Rico) Wilfredo Gómez	WBC
1983-06-15	1984-11-03	(United States) Jaime Garza	WBC
1984-11-03	1985-08-18	(Mexico) Juan Meza	WBC
1985-08-18	1986-01-18	(Mexico) Lupe Pintor	WBC
1986-01-18	1987-05-08	(Thailand) Samart Payakaroon	WBC
1987-05-08	1987-10-16-Vacated	(Australia) Jeff Fenech	WBC
1988-02-29	1990-04-23	(Mexico) Daniel Zaragoza	WBC
1990-04-23	1990-11-05	(United States) Paul Banke	WBC
1990-11-05	1991-02-03	(Argentina) Pedro Rubén Décima	WBC
1991-02-03	1991-06-14	(Japan) Kiyoshi Hatanaka	WBC
1991-06-14	1992-03-20	(Mexico) Daniel Zaragoza	WBC
1992-03-20	1992-06-23	(France) Thierry Jacob	WBC
1992-06-23	1994-08-26	(United States) Tracy Harris Patterson	WBC
1994-08-26	1995-11-06	(Dominican Republic) Hector Acero Sánchez	WBC
1995-11-06	1997-09-06	(Mexico) Daniel Zaragoza	WBC
1997-09-06	2000-02-19-Vacated	(Mexico) Erik Morales	WBC
2000-09-09	2002-11-01	(United States) Willie Jorrin	WBC
2002-11-01	2005-12-03	(Mexico) Óscar Larios	WBC
2005-12-03	2007-03-03	(Mexico) Israel Vázquez	WBC
2007-03-03	2007-08-04	(Mexico) Rafael Márquez	WBC
2007-08-04	2008-12-18-Vacated	(Mexico) Israel Vázquez	WBC
2008-12-18	2012-03-15-Vacated	(Japan) Toshiaki Nishioka	WBC
2012-04-21	2013-02-12-Vacated	(Mexico) Abner Mares	WBC
2013-04-20	2013-08-24	(Mexico) Victor Terrazas	WBC
2013-08-24	2015-11-01-Vacated	(Mexico) Leo Santa Cruz	WBC
2015-11-01	2016-02-27	(Mexico) Julio Ceja	WBC
2016-02-27	2016-09-16	(Mexico) Hugo Ruiz	WBC
2016-09-16	2016-09-16-Vacated	(Japan) Hozumi Hasegawa	WBC
2017-02-25	2020-08-13-Stripped	(Mexico) Rey Vargas	WBC
2020-09-26	2021-05-15	(Mexico) Luis Nery	WBC
2021-05-15	2021-11-27	(United States) Brandon Figueroa	WBC
2021-11-27	2023-07-25	(United States) Stephen Fulton	WBC
2023-07-25	Present	(Japan) Naoya Inoue	WBC

== WBA ==
Reign Began	Reign Ended	Champion	Recognition
Title inaugurated
1977-11-26	1978-05-07	(South Korea) Soo-Hwan Hong	WBA
1978-05-07	1980-05-04	(Colombia) Ricardo Cardona	WBA
1980-05-04	1980-08-09	(United States) Leo Randolph	WBA
1980-08-09	1982-06-12	(Argentina) Sergio Victor Palma	WBA
1982-06-12	1984-02-22	(Dominican Republic) Leonardo Cruz	WBA
1984-02-22	1984-05-26	(Italy) Loris Stecca	WBA
1984-05-26	1986-Vacated	(Puerto Rico) Victor Callejas	WBA
1987-01-16	1987-11-28	(United States) Louie Espinoza	WBA
1987-11-28	1988-02-27	(Dominican Republic) Julio Gervacio	WBA
1988-02-27	1988-05-28	(Venezuela) Bernardo Pinango	WBA
1988-05-28	1989-12-11	(Mexico) Juan Jose Estrada	WBA
1989-12-11	1990-Stripped	(Philippines) Jesus Salud	WBA
1990-09-11	1991-10-07	(Colombia) Luis Mendoza	WBA
1991-10-07	1992-03-27	(Mexico) Raúl Pérez	WBA
1992-03-27	1995-05-13	(Puerto Rico) Wilfredo Vázquez	WBA
1995-05-13	1998-Vacated	(Venezuela) Antonio Cermeno	WBA
1998-02-08	1998-12-12	(Mexico) Enrique Sánchez	WBA
1998-12-12	2000-03-04	(Mexico) Néstor Garza	WBA
2000-03-04	2001-03-23-Vacated	(United States) Clarence Adams	WBA
2001-11-17	2002-02-21	(Venezuela) Yober Ortega	WBA
2002-02-21	2002-05-18	(Thailand) Yoddamrong Sithyodthong	WBA
2002-05-18	2002-10-09	(Japan) Osamu Sato	WBA
2002-10-09	2003-07-04	(France) Salim Medjkoune	WBA
2003-07-04	2006-04-21	(France) Mahyar Monshipour	WBA
2006-04-21	2006-10-04	(Thailand) Somsak Sithchatchawal	WBA
2006-10-04	2010-12-10-Vacated	(Panama) Celestino Caballero	WBA/Unified/Super Champion
2008-11-21	2009-03-21	(Panama) Ricardo Córdoba	WBA Regular Champion
2009-03-21	2009-09-26	(Republic of Ireland) Bernard Dunne	WBA Regular Champion
2009-09-26	2010-10-02	(Thailand) Poonsawat Kratingdaenggym	WBA Regular Champion
2010-10-02	2011-01-31	(North Korea) Lee Ryol-li	WBA Regular Champion/WBA
2011-01-31	2011-07-09	(Japan) Akifumi Shimoda	WBA
2011-07-09	2012-01-20	(United States) Rico Ramos	WBA
2012-01-20	2015-10-30-Champion in Recess	(Cuba) Guillermo Rigondeaux	WBA/WBA Super Champion
2013-09-05	2016-02-27	(United Kingdom) Scott Quigg	WBA Regular Champion/WBA
2016-02-27	2016-04-07-Vacated	(United Kingdom) Carl Frampton	WBA Unified Champion
2016-05-14	2017-12-09-Stripped	(Cuba) Guillermo Rigondeaux	WBA Super Champion
2016-06-24	2017-04-09	(Venezuela) Nehomar Cermeño	WBA Regular Champion
2017-04-09	2017-09-03	(Japan) Shun Kubo	WBA Regular Champion
2017-09-03	2020-01-30	(United States) Daniel Roman	WBA Regular Champion/WBA Unified Champion
2019-10-31	2021-11-27-Stripped	(United States) Brandon Figueroa	WBA Regular Champion
2020-01-30	2023-04-08	(Uzbekistan) Murodjon Akhmadaliev	WBA Super Champion
2023-04-08	2023-12-26	(Philippines) Marlon Tapales	WBA Super Champion
2023-12-26	Present	(Japan) Naoya Inoue	WBA Super Champion

== IBF ==
Reign Began	Reign Ended	Champion	Recognition
Title inaugurated
1983-12-04	1984-04-15	(Philippines) Bobby Berna	IBF
1984-04-15	1985-01-03	(South Korea) Suh Sung-in	IBF
1985-01-03	1986-06-01-Retired	(South Korea) Kim Ji-won	IBF
1987-01-18	1987-12-27-Vacated	(South Korea) Lee Seung-hoon	IBF
1988-05-21	1989-03-10	(Venezuela) José Sanabria	IBF
1989-03-10	1990-03-10	(France) Fabrice Benichou	IBF
1990-03-10	1992-12-02	(South Africa) Welcome Ncita	IBF
1992-12-02	1994-08-20	(United States) Kennedy McKinney	IBF
1994-08-20	1999-02-06-Vacated	(South Africa) Vuyani Bungu	IBF
1999-05-29	2001-06-23	(South Africa) Lehlo Ledwaba	IBF
2001-06-23	2003-07-26-Vacated	(Philippines) Manny Pacquiao	IBF
2004-03-25	2005-12-03-Vacated	(Mexico) Israel Vázquez	IBF
2006-11-10	2008-11-21	(Canada) Steve Molitor	IBF
2008-11-21	2010-02-05-Stripped	(Panama) Celestino Caballero	IBF
2010-03-27	2011-03-26	(Canada) Steve Molitor	IBF
2011-03-26	2012-03-24	(South Africa) Takalani Ndlovu	IBF
2012-03-24	2012-07-07	(South Africa) Jeffrey Mathebula	IBF
2012-07-07	2012-10-13-Vacated	(Philippines) Nonito Donaire	IBF
2013-02-16	2013-08-17	(Colombia) Jonatan Romero	IBF
2013-08-17	2014-09-06	(Spain) Kiko Martínez	IBF
2014-09-06	2016-04-28-Vacated	(United Kingdom) Carl Frampton	IBF
2016-07-20	2016-12-31	(Dominican Republic) Jonathan Guzmán	IBF
2016-12-31	2017-09-13	(Japan) Yukinori Oguni	IBF
2017-09-13	2018-16-08	(Japan) Ryosuke Iwasa	IBF
2018-16-08	2019-04-26	(Republic of Ireland) T. J. Doheny	IBF
2019-04-26	2020-01-30	(United States) Daniel Roman	IBF
2020-01-30	2023-04-08	(Uzbekistan) Murodjon Akhmadaliev	IBF
2023-04-08	2023-12-26	(Philippines) Marlon Tapales	IBF
2023-12-26	Present	(Japan) Naoya Inoue	IBF

== WBO ==
Reign Began	Reign Ended	Champion	Recognition
Title inaugurated
1989-04-29	1989-12-09	(United States) Kenny Mitchell	WBO
1989-12-09	1990-05-12	(Italy) Valerio Nati	WBO
1990-05-12	1991-05-24	(Puerto Rico) Orlando Fernandez	WBO
1991-05-24	1992-10-15	(United States) Jesse Benavides	WBO
1992-10-15	1993-06-09	(United Kingdom) Duke McKenzie	WBO
1993-06-09	1995-03-31	(Puerto Rico) Daniel Jimenez	WBO
1995-03-31	1996-11-22	(Mexico) Marco Antonio Barrera	WBO
1996-11-22	1997-12-19	(United States) Junior Jones	WBO
1997-12-19	1998-Vacated	(United States) Kennedy McKinney	WBO
1998-10-31	2000-02-19	(Mexico) Marco Antonio Barrera	WBO
2000-02-19	2000-02-19-Vacated	(Mexico) Erik Morales	WBO
2000-06-17	2001-04-07-Vacated	(Mexico) Marco Antonio Barrera	WBO
2001-06-23	2002-08-15-Stripped	(Dominican Republic) Agapito Sanchez	WBO
2002-08-17	2005-04-22-Vacated	(Dominican Republic) Joan Guzmán	WBO
2005-10-29	2008-06-07	(Mexico) Daniel Ponce de León	WBO
2008-06-07	2010-01-23-Vacated	(Puerto Rico) Juan Manuel López	WBO
2010-02-27	2011-05-07	(Puerto Rico) Wilfredo Vázquez, Jr.	WBO
2011-05-07	2011-11-18-Vacated	(Mexico) Jorge Arce	WBO
2012-02-04	2013-04-13	(Philippines) Nonito Donaire	WBO
2013-04-13	2015-10-28-Stripped	(Cuba) Guillermo Rigondeaux	WBO
2015-12-11	2016-11-05	(Philippines) Nonito Donaire	WBO
2016-11-05	2018-04-28	(United States) Jessie Magdaleno	WBO
2018-04-28	2018-12-08	(United Kingdom) Isaac Dogboe	WBO
2018-12-08	2020-07-11-Vacated	(Mexico) Emanuel Navarrete	WBO
2020-08-01	2021-01-23	(United States) Angelo Leo	WBO
2021-01-23	2023-07-25	(United States) Stephen Fulton	WBO
2023-07-25	Present	(Japan) Naoya Inoue	WBO

== See also ==
- List of British world boxing champions
