= Salim Medjkoune =

French boxer

Personal information
- Nickname: Medje
- Nationality: French
- Born: 4 January 1972 (age 54) Aubière, France
- Height: 5 ft 5 1/2 in (166 cm)
- Weight: Bantamweight; Super bantamweight

Boxing career
- Reach: 68 in (173 cm)
- Stance: Southpaw

Boxing record
- Total fights: 49
- Wins: 43
- Win by KO: 21
- Losses: 5
- Draws: 1

Salim Medjkoune (born 4 January 1972), is a French former professional boxer who competed from 1992 to 2004. He won the World Boxing Association super bantamweight title in 2002.

== Professional career ==
Medjkoune turned professional in 1992 & amassed a record of 39-3-1 before he fought & beat Japanese boxer Osamu Sato, to win the WBA super bantamweight world title. He defended the title once against Italian boxer Vincenzo Gigliotti, before losing it to Iran's Mahyar Monshipour.

== Professional boxing record ==
49 fights	43 wins	5 losses
By knockout	21	5
By decision	21	0
By disqualification	1	0
Draws	1	

No.	Result	Record	Opponent	Type	Round, time	Date	Location	Notes
49	Loss	43–5–1	Mahyar Monshipour	TKO	8 (12)	2004-05-27	Zenith d'Auvergne, Clermont-Ferrand, France	For WBA super bantamweight title
48	Win	43–4–1	Oscar Arnaldo Toscano	DQ	3 (8)	2004-02-20	Saint-Dizier, France	
47	Win	42–4–1	Manuel Sequera	PTS	8 (8)	2003-12-16	Palais Marcel Cerdan, Levallois-Perret, France	
46	Loss	41–4–1	Mahyar Monshipour	KO	12 (12)	2003-07-04	Futuroscope, Poitiers, France	Lost WBA super bantamweight title
45	Win	41–3–1	Vincenzo Gigliotti	UD	12 (12)	2003-04-04	Maison des Sports, Clermont-Ferrand, France	Retained WBA super bantamweight title
44	Win	40–3–1	Osamu Sato	UD	12 (12)	2002-10-09	Yoyogi National Gymnasium, Tokyo, Japan	Won WBA super bantamweight title
43	Win	39–3–1	Dimitar Alipiev	KO	1 (?)	2002-08-10	Plage du Prado, Marseille, France	
42	Draw	38–3–1	Mustapha Hame	TD	4 (12)	2002-01-18	Clermont-Ferrand, France	Retained EBU super bantamweight title
41	Win	38–3	Sandor Koczak	TKO	4 (12)	2001-09-15	Hotel Atlantic Palace, Agadir, Morocco	Retained EBU super bantamweight title
40	Win	37–3	Vladimir Varhegyi	TKO	4 (6)	2001-07-03	Pont-Sainte-Maxence, France	
39	Win	36–3	Vladislav Antonov	TKO	7 (12)	2001-03-06	Maison des Sports, Clermont-Ferrand, France	Won EBU super bantamweight title
38	Win	35–3	Salem Bouaita	PTS	10 (10)	2000-12-09	Clermont-Ferrand, France	Retained French super bantamweight title
37	Win	34–3	Mustapha Hame	TKO	4 (10)	2000-08-29	Palavas-les-Flots, France	Won vacant French super bantamweight title
36	Win	33–3	Imrich Parlagi	TKO	4 (?)	2000-06-03	Royat, France	
35	Loss	32–3	Michael Brodie	TKO	9 (12)	2000-02-26	The Sands Centre, Carlisle, England, U.K.	For EBU super bantamweight title
34	Win	32–2	Wladimir Borov	PTS	10 (10)	1999-12-04	Clermont-Ferrand, France	
33	Win	31–2	Kevin Gerowski	PTS	6 (6)	1999-10-01	York Hall, Bethnal Green, England, U.K.	
32	Win	30–2	Peter Buckley	PTS	6 (6)	1999-07-15	Werrington Sports Centre, Peterborough, England, U.K.	
31	Loss	29–2	Michael Brodie	TKO	9 (12)	1999-03-13	Bowlers Exhibition Centre, Manchester, England, U.K.	For EBU super bantamweight title
30	Win	29–1	Martin Krastev	TKO	2 (?)	1998-11-07	Royat, France	
29	Win	28–1	Peter Buckley	PTS	6 (6)	1998-04-11	Elephant & Castle Centre, Southwark, England, U.K.	
28	Win	27–1	Wilson Acuna	PTS	8 (8)	1998-03-14	Vichy, France	
27	Win	26–1	Demir Nanev	TKO	4 (6)	1998-01-31	Lee Valley Leisure Centre, Picketts Lock, England, U.K.	
26	Win	25–1	Kamel Guerfi	PTS	8 (8)	1997-05-31	Clermont-Ferrand, France	
25	Win	24–1	Narcisse Nzolandima	PTS	8 (8)	1997-04-26	Moulins, France	
24	Win	23–1	Marian Stoica	KO	4 (?)	1997-03-01	Halle Georges Carpentier, Paris, France	
23	Loss	22–1	Martin Krastev	KO	1 (12)	1996-12-29	Maison des Sports, Clermont-Ferrand, France	Lost EBU super bantamweight title
22	Win	21–1	Mauricio Bernal	TKO	5 (?)	1996-11-02	Palais Marcel Cerdan, Levallois-Perret, France	
21	Win	21–0	Vincenzo Belcastro	TKO	8 (12)	1996-07-11	Castello Sforzesco, Pavia, Lombardia, Italy	Won EBU super bantamweight title
20	Win	20–0	Ahmed Kamel Djerbal	TKO	4 (6)	1996-04-20	Palais Marcel Cerdan, Levallois-Perret, France	
19	Win	19–0	Valentin Kirov	KO	3 (?)	1996-03-23	Courpière, France	
18	Win	18–0	Pape Diouf	TKO	2 (?)	1995-12-18	Abidjan, Ivory Coast	
17	Win	17–0	Fernando Lugo	KO	4 (?)	1995-11-25	Vichy, France	
16	Win	16–0	Christian Sextius	PTS	8 (8)	1995-06-27	Palais Marcel Cerdan, Levallois-Perret, France	
15	Win	15–0	Akim Ouchen	PTS	10 (10)	1995-03-24	Royat, France	Won vacant French bantamweight title
14	Win	14–0	Antonio Duarte	TKO	2 (8)	1995-01-03	Épernay, France	
13	Win	13–0	Jean Marc Cammalieri	PTS	8 (8)	1994-11-25	Romorantin-Lanthenay, France	
12	Win	12–0	Conn McMullen	PTS	8 (8)	1994-11-04	Aubière, France	
11	Win	11–0	Josef Masiar	TKO	5 (?)	1994-05-07	Billom, France	
10	Win	10–0	Jean Marc Cammalieri	PTS	8 (8)	1994-02-04	Courpière, France	
9	Win	9–0	Jacky Sery	TKO	1 (?)	1993-12-18	Aubière, France	
8	Win	8–0	Fernando Lugo	PTS	8 (8)	1993-11-26	Vichy, France	
7	Win	7–0	Habib Sahour	PTS	6 (6)	1993-06-18	Aulnay-sous-Bois, France	
6	Win	6–0	Kamel Guerfi	PTS	6 (6)	1993-04-24	Le Puy-en-Velay, France	
5	Win	5–0	Jeno Kolompar	KO	2 (?)	1993-03-26	Courpière, France	
4	Win	4–0	Mahfoud Bengoufa	TKO	3 (?)	1993-02-19	Royat, France	
3	Win	3–0	Harun Ince	PTS	6 (6)	1993-01-30	Aubière, France	
2	Win	2–0	Kamel Tine	KO	2 (?)	1992-12-18	Zenith d'Auvergne, Clermont-Ferrand, France	
1	Win	1–0	Valery Boucher	PTS	6 (6)	1992-11-27	Cusset, France	

== See also ==
- List of world super-bantamweight boxing champions

Sporting positions
Regional boxing titles
Preceded by Vincenzo Belcastro	EBU super bantamweight champion 11 July 1996 – 29 December 1996	Succeeded by Martin Krastev
Preceded by Vladislav Antonov	EBU super bantamweight champion 6 March 2001 – 2002; Vacated	Vacant Title next held by Mahyar Monshipour
World boxing titles
Preceded by Osamu Sato	WBA super bantamweight champion 9 October 2002 – 4 July 2003	Succeeded by Mahyar Monshipour
