= Kim Ji-won (boxer) =

South Korean boxer (born 1959)

Personal information
- Nationality: South Korean
- Born: 6 August 1959 (age 67) Seoul, South Korea
- Height: 5 ft 7 in (1.70 m)
- Weight: Super bantamweight

Boxing career
- Stance: Southpaw

Boxing record
- Total fights: 18
- Wins: 16
- Win by KO: 7
- Draws: 2
Medal record
Representing South Korea
Men's Boxing
Asian Amateur Championships
Gold medal – first place	Bombay 1980	Flyweight

- Kim Ji-won
- Hangul: 김지원
- Hanja: 金知元
- RR: Gim Jiwon
- MR: Kim Chiwŏn

Kim Ji-won (Korean: 김지원; Hanja: 金知元; born 6 August 1959 in Seoul) is a former South Korean boxer who was an unbeaten world champion in the super bantamweight division. He is one of just fifteen world boxing champions to retire without a loss.

== Amateur career ==
Kim began garnering attention in 1978 when he won the flyweight (-51 kg) gold medal at the Asian Junior Amateur Boxing Championships in Karachi, Pakistan.

In 1979, Kim won the gold medal in the flyweight division at the CISM Amateur Boxing Championships in Caracas, Venezuela, beating Oudahi Mohammad Amin of Algeria via first-round knockout in the final bout.

In February 1980, Kim participated in the Asian Amateur Boxing Championships held in Bombay, India. There he captured the gold medal in the flyweight division. In April 1980, Kim won the flyweight gold medal at the King's Cup Boxing, beating future World Amateur Boxing Championship bronze medalist Constantin Titoiu of Romania in the final bout.

In 1981, Kim won the bantamweight gold medal at the King's Cup Boxing, defeating future Commonwealth Games gold medalist Hussein Khalili of Kenya in the final.

== Pro career ==
On 17 May 1983 the southpaw defeated Chun Chan-jung for the Korean super bantamweight title. Four months later he fought Little Bangoyan for the vacant Oriental and Pacific Boxing Federation (OPBF) title, capturing it with a twelve-round decision. For the next year Kim made five defenses of his OPBF title against the likes of Lito Cortez (KO 2), Rolando Navarro (PTS 12), and Fel Malatag (TKO 6).

On 3 January 1985, he fought countryman and reigning International Boxing Federation super bantamweight champion Suh Sung-in. Kim won via a tenth round stoppage. Kim would make four successful defenses of his title against future WBO featherweight champion Ruben Dario Palacios (W15, 30 March 1985), former IBF super bantamweight champions Bobby Berna (KO 4, 28 June 1985) and Suh Sung-in (KO 1, 9 October 1985), and Rudy Casicas (KO 2, 2 May 1986).

In December 1986, he retired from boxing in order to become a theatrical actor and singer, finishing with a record of 16 wins, no losses, and two draws, both draws coming from the same boxer. He would become one of the few world champions to retire undefeated.

== Personal life ==
Kim has one sister, Ji-Sook, the Grand Bell Award winning actress, and one brother, Ji-Woon who is a world-acclaimed filmmaker.

== Professional boxing record ==
18 fights	16 wins	0 losses
By knockout	7	0
By decision	9	0
Draws	2	

No.	Result	Record	Opponent	Type	Round	Date	Location	Notes
18	Win	16–0–2	Rudy Casicas	TKO	2 (15)	Jun 1, 1986	Incheon Gymnasium, Incheon, South Korea	Retained IBF super-bantamweight title
17	Win	15–0–2	Suh Sung-in	KO	1 (15)	Oct 9, 1985	Chungbuk Gymnasium, Cheongju, South Korea	Retained IBF super-bantamweight title
16	Win	14–0–2	Bobby Berna	KO	4 (15)	Jun 28, 1985	Gudeok Gymnasium, Busan, South Korea	Retained IBF super-bantamweight title
15	Win	13–0–2	Rubén Darío Palacio	UD	15	Mar 30, 1985	Suwon Gymnasium, Suwon, South Korea	Retained IBF super-bantamweight title
14	Win	12–0–2	Suh Sung-in	KO	10 (15)	Jan 3, 1985	Munhwa Gymnasium, Seoul, South Korea	Won IBF super-bantamweight title
13	Win	11–0–2	Fel Malatag	TKO	6 (12)	Sep 15, 1984	Pohang Gymnasium, Pohang, South Korea	Retained OPBF super-bantamweight title
12	Win	10–0–2	Rolando Navarro	PTS	12	Apr 8, 1984	Cheongju Gymnasium, Cheongju, South Korea	Retained OPBF super-bantamweight title
11	Win	9–0–2	Saipa Monod	KO	4 (12)	Feb 12, 1984	Daegu Gymnasium, Daegu, South Korea	Retained OPBF super-bantamweight title
10	Win	8–0–2	Lito Cortez	KO	2 (12)	Dec 11, 1983	Citizen Hall, Uijeongbu City, South Korea	Retained OPBF super-bantamweight title
9	Win	7–0–2	Little Bangoyan	UD	12	Oct 29, 1983	Uijeongbu City, South Korea	Won vacant OPBF super-bantamweight title
8	Win	6–0–2	Chan Joong Jun	PTS	10	Sep 18, 1983	Chiak Gymnasium, Wonju, South Korea	Won South Korea super-bantamweight title
7	Draw	5–0–2	Neptali Alamag	PTS	10	May 17, 1983	Munhwa Gymnasium, Seoul, South Korea	
6	Win	5–0–1	Sandy Noora	PTS	10	Feb 27, 1983	Munhwa Gymnasium, Seoul, South Korea	
5	Win	4–0–1	Yoo Kyung Huh	PTS	10	Dec 12, 1982	Munhwa Gymnasium, Seoul, South Korea	
4	Draw	3–0–1	Neptali Alamag	SD	10	Sep 10, 1982	Araneta Coliseum, Barangay Cubao, Quezon City, Metro Manila, Philippines	
3	Win	3–0	Efren Quinta	PTS	10	Apr 17, 1982	Munhwa Gymnasium, Seoul, South Korea	
2	Win	2–0	Danilo Inocian	PTS	10	Feb 28, 1982	Munhwa Gymnasium, Seoul, South Korea	
1	Win	1–0	Hyung Shik Ahn	PTS	8	Jan 24, 1982	Munhwa Gymnasium, Seoul, South Korea	

Preceded by Suh Sung-in	IBF Super Bantamweight Champion; 3 Jan 1985 – 1986; Retired	Succeeded by Lee Seung-hoon
