= Kenny Mitchell =

American boxer (born 1960)

Personal information
- Nickname: Machine Gun
- Born: February 7, 1960 (age 66) Charleston, South Carolina, U.S.
- Height: 5 ft 2 in (157 cm)
- Weight: Bantamweight; Super bantamweight

Boxing career
- Reach: 64 in (163 cm)
- Stance: Orthodox

Boxing record
- Total fights: 40
- Wins: 22
- Win by KO: 5
- Losses: 15
- Draws: 3

Kenny Mitchell (born February 7, 1960, in Stockton, California) is a former professional boxer.

== Amateur career ==
Mitchell won the New York Golden Gloves three times. He won the 112 lb Open Championships in 1978, 1979 and 1980. Mitchell was defeated in the 1977 112 lb Sub-Novice Championship by Gino Gelormino. Mitchell trained at the Morrisania Youth Center in 1977 and 1978. In 1979 and 1980 Mitchell trained at the Fort Apache Boys Club. Both Gyms are located in the Bronx, New York.

== Professional career ==
Mitchell began his career in 1981. He would lose to future world champion Jesus Salud in 1986. In 1989 captured the Newly Created and vacant WBO super bantamweight title with a win over Julio Gervacio by decision. He defended the belt once against South African contender Simon Skosana, before losing it to Valerio Nati in later in 1989 by disqualification. In the bout, Mitchell was DQ'ed for illegal use of his head. The result was initially listed as a technical decision for Nati amidst a lot of controversy, but finally ended up being ruled a DQ. Mitchell retired in 1995 after being knocked out by Erik Morales.

== Professional boxing record ==
40 fights	22 wins	15 losses
By knockout	5	4
By decision	17	9
By disqualification	0	2
Draws	3	

No.	Result	Record	Opponent	Type	Round, time	Date	Location	Notes
40	Loss	22–15–3	Erik Morales	TKO	2 (12)	1995-12-18	Tijuana, Mexico	For NABF super-bantamweight title
39	Loss	22–14–3	Johnny Bredahl	PTS	8 (8)	1995-03-17	K.B. Hallen, Copenhagen, Denmark	
38	Loss	22–13–3	Angel Manfredy	PTS	6 (6)	1994-08-09	Mystic Lake Casino Hotel, Prior Lake, Minnesota, U.S.	
37	Win	22–12–3	Jose Luis Gonzales	UD	6 (6)	1994-06-17	Jasper, Tennessee, U.S.	
36	Loss	21–12–3	Welcome Ncita	KO	2 (10)	1994-02-19	Carousel Casino, Hammanskraal, South Africa	
35	Win	21–11–3	Miguel Torres	PTS	6 (6)	1993-09-23	Biloxi Belle Casino, Biloxi, Mississippi, U.S.	
34	Loss	20–11–3	Enrique Jupiter	TKO	4 (?)	1992-12-05	Toreo de Cuatro Caminos, Mexico City, Mexico	
33	Loss	20–10–3	Juan Valencia	DQ	4 (?)	1992-05-22	Toreo de Cuatro Caminos, Mexico City, Mexico	
32	Loss	20–9–3	Tracy Harris Patterson	TKO	8 (12)	1990-04-19	Mid-Hudson Civic Center, Poughkeepsie, New York, U.S.	For NABF super-bantamweight title
31	Loss	20–8–3	Valerio Nati	DQ	4 (12)	1989-12-09	Teramo, Italy	Lost WBO super-bantamweight title
30	Win	20–7–3	Simon Skosana	UD	12 (12)	1989-09-09	Roberto Clemente Coliseum, San Juan, Puerto Rico	Retained WBO super-bantamweight title
29	Win	19–7–3	Julio Gervacio	UD	12 (12)	1989-04-29	Roberto Clemente Coliseum, San Juan, Puerto Rico	Won inaugural WBO super-bantamweight title
28	Win	18–7–3	Roland Gomez	UD	12 (12)	1989-02-13	The Forum, Inglewood, California, U.S.	Retained USBA bantamweight title
27	Win	17–7–3	Gilberto Contreras	RTD	8 (12)	1988-07-13	The Forum, Inglewood, California, U.S.	Retained USBA bantamweight title
26	Win	16–7–3	Gaby Canizales	SD	12 (12)	1988-03-25	George R. Brown Convention Center, Houston, Texas, U.S.	Won USBA bantamweight title
25	Loss	15–7–3	Luigi Camputaro	PTS	10 (10)	1987-11-27	Veterans Memorial Coliseum, New Haven, Connecticut, U.S.	
24	Draw	15–6–3	Lucilo Nolasco	TD	8 (10)	1986-08-13	The Forum, Inglewood, California, U.S.	
23	Loss	15–6–2	Jesus Salud	SD	10 (10)	1986-04-21	The Forum, Inglewood, California, U.S.	
22	Win	15–5–2	Tony Montoya	TKO	1 (10)	1986-02-10	The Forum, Inglewood, California, U.S.	
21	Win	14–5–2	Jeff Whaley	TKO	8 (10)	1986-01-13	The Forum, Inglewood, California, U.S.	
20	Loss	13–5–2	Julian Solís	UD	10 (10)	1984-12-08	Hiram Bithorn Stadium, San Juan, Puerto Rico	
19	Win	13–4–2	Pedro Alindato	SD	12 (12)	1984-09-13	Felt Forum, New York City, New York, U.S.	Won vacant New York State bantamweight title
18	Draw	12–4–2	Pedro Alindato	PTS	8 (8)	1984-01-15	Resorts Casino Hotel, Atlantic City, New Jersey, U.S.	
17	Loss	12–4–1	Mike Ayala	UD	12 (12)	1983-04-29	Freeman Coliseum, San Antonio, Texas, U.S.	For NABF super-bantamweight title
16	Loss	12–3–1	Lenny Valdez	UD	10 (10)	1983-01-27	Showboat Hotel and Casino, Las Vegas, Nevada, U.S.	
15	Win	12–2–1	Jeff Roberts	UD	8 (8)	1982-10-23	Boardwalk Hall, Atlantic City, New Jersey, U.S.	
14	Win	11–2–1	Kelvin Seabrooks	MD	10 (10)	1982-07-17	Bally's Park Place, Atlantic City, New Jersey, U.S.	
13	Draw	10–2–1	Gaybon Yekiso	PTS	8 (8)	1982-04-26	Ellis Park Stadium, Johannesburg, South Africa	
12	Win	10–2	Robert Mullins	UD	10 (10)	1982-03-05	Tropicana Hotel & Casino, Atlantic City, New Jersey, U.S.	
11	Loss	9–2	Derrik Holmes	MD	10 (10)	1982-01-07	Sands Casino Hotel, Atlantic City, New Jersey, U.S.	
10	Win	9–1	Angel Marrero	UD	8 (8)	1981-10-31	Sands Casino Hotel, Atlantic City, New Jersey, U.S.	
9	Win	8–1	Carlos Bejarano	PTS	8	Oct 3, 1981	Bally's Park Place, Atlantic City, New Jersey, U.S.	
8	Win	7–1	Adan Uribe	UD	6	1981-07-21	Golden Hall, San Diego, California, U.S.	
7	Win	6–1	Ian Clyde	PTS	6	1981-06-11	Los Angeles, California, U.S.	
6	Win	5–1	Jose Panulaya	TKO	6 (8)	1981-06-05	Auditorium, Oakland, California, U.S.	
5	Loss	4–1	Mario Savala	UD	6	1981-05-08	Memorial Auditorium, Sacramento, California, U.S.	
4	Win	4–0	Mario Cortez	TKO	4 (?)	1981-04-17	Stockton, California, U.S.	
3	Win	3–0	James Manning	SD	8	1981-03-26	Multnomah County Expo Center, Portland, Oregon, U.S.	
2	Win	2–0	Nestor Obregon	PTS	8	1981-02-12	Olympic Auditorium, Los Angeles, California, U.S.	
1	Win	1–0	Mario Savala	MD	6	1981-01-13	Memorial Auditorium, Sacramento, California, U.S.	

== See also ==
- List of world super-bantamweight boxing champions

Sporting positions
Regional boxing titles
New title	New York State bantamweight champion September 13, 1984 – April 29, 1989; Won world title	Vacant Title next held by Juan Domínguez
Preceded by Gaby Canizales	USBA bantamweight champion March 25, 1988 – April 29, 1989; Won world title	Vacant Title next held by Eddie Rangel
World boxing titles
Inaugural champion	WBO super-bantamweight champion April 29, 1989 – December 9, 1989	Succeeded by Valerio Nati
