= Alexis Argüello vs. Ray Mancini =

Boxing match contested in 1981

Lightweight Lightning at Bally's
- Date: October 3, 1981
- Venue: Bally's Park Place, Atlantic City, New Jersey, U.S.
- Title(s) on the line: WBC and The Ring lightweight titles

Tale of the tape
Boxer	Alexis Argüello	Ray Mancini
Nickname	El Flaco Explosivo ("The Explosive Thin Man")	Boom Boom
Hometown	Managua, Nicaragua	Youngstown, Ohio, U.S.
Purse	$400,000	$100,000
Pre-fight record	67–5 (54 KO)	20–0 (15 KO)
Age	29 years, 5 months	20 years, 6 months
Height	5 ft 10 in (178 cm)	5 ft 4 1/2 in (164 cm)
Weight	135 lb (61 kg)	134 lb (61 kg)
Style	Orthodox	Orthodox
Recognition	WBC and The Ring; Lightweight Champion; 3-division world champion	WBC; No. 3 Ranked Lightweight; NABF lightweight champion

Result
- Argüello wins via 14th-round technical knockout

Alexis Argüello vs. Ray Mancini, billed as Lightweight Lightning at Bally's, was a professional boxing match contested on October 3, 1981, for the WBC lightweight title.

== Background ==
20-year old undefeated prospect Ray Mancini had risen up the lightweight ranks and become legitimate title contender in the proceeding months in 1981. First by winning the NABF lightweight title from Jorge Morales in May and then successfully defending the title in July against fellow lightweight contender and future world champion José Luis Ramírez. Following his victory over Ramírez, Mancini signed on to face reigning WBC lightweight champion Alexis Argüello. Argüello had won the title the previous month from Jim Watt, becoming a world champion in three divisions, and had subsequently agreed to face the winner of the Mancini–Ramírez fight.

Argüello, a veteran of 75 fights and having 15 consecutive title fights, came into the bout as a 3–1 favorite, but nevertheless affirmed that he would not take Mancini lightly, opining that it would be the "toughest fight of my career."

== Fight details ==
The fight was a close one with Mancini getting off to a fast start, taking most of the early rounds on the judge's scorecards. However, after the fifth round, Argüello rebounded and took the next several and following the tenth round, the two fighters were practically neck and neck, with Mancini holding leading on one scorecard, Argüello leading on another and the two tied on the third. With the fight still in the balance, Argüello would seize control of the fight in the closing seconds of the 12th round when he caught Mancini flush with a big right hand that sent Mancini to his right knee for the fight's first knockdown. With Mancini surviving the knockdown and convincing his corner to allow him to continue, he would go back out for the 13th round, Argüello would dominate the round, leading to Mancini's manager Dave Wolf to nearly throw in the towel before being stopped by the head trainer Murphy Griffith. Then, about halfway through the 14th round, Argüello stunned Mancini with a left-right-left combination before landing a big right hook that sent Mancini down again. After the knockdown, referee Tony Perez immediately waved the fight off, giving Argüello the victory by technical knockout at 1:44 of the 14th round.

== Fight card ==
Confirmed bouts:

Weight Class	Weight		vs.		Method	Round	Notes
Lightweight	135 lbs.	Alexis Argüello (c)	def.	Ray Mancini	TKO	14/15	^{note 1}
Super Middleweight	168 lbs.	Alex Ramos	def.	Fermin Guzman	TKO	6/10
Featherweight	126 lbs.	Kenny Mitchell	def.	Carlos Bejarano	PTS	8
Cruiserweight	190 lbs.	Randy Stephens	def.	Fred Brown	TKO	2/8
Welterweight	147 lbs.	Jeff Passero	def.	Evaristo Primero	TKO	3/8

^Note 1 For WBC and The Ring Lightweight Titles

== Broadcasting ==
Country	Broadcaster
United States	CBS

Preceded by vs. Jim Watt	Alexis Argüello's bouts 3 October 1981	Succeeded by vs. Roberto Elizondo
Preceded by vs. José Luis Ramírez	Ray Mancini's bouts 3 October 1981	Succeeded by vs. Manuel Abedoy
