= Alex Ramos =

Puerto Rican boxer

Personal information
- Nickname: Bronx Bomber
- Nationality: Puerto Rican
- Born: Alex Ramos; January 17, 1961 Manhattan, New York, U.S.
- Height: 5 ft 10 in (1.78 m)
- Weight: Middleweight

Boxing career
- Stance: Orthodox

Boxing record
- Total fights: 51
- Wins: 39
- Win by KO: 24
- Losses: 10
- Draws: 2

Alex Ramos (born January 17, 1961) is a former middleweight boxer from the 1980s. A native of Manhattan, New York, whose parents were from Puerto Rico, Ramos won four Golden Gloves titles in New York City in the late 1970s (1977–1980) and was on the USA Boxing team from 1978 to 1980. Ramos was nicknamed "The Bronx Bomber" after Joe Louis, whose nickname was "The Brown Bomber".

Ramos turned pro after his amateur career was abruptly ended by President Jimmy Carter's decision to boycott the 1980 Summer Olympics in Moscow due to the Russian invasion of Afghanistan. Upon turning pro, Ramos was the first professional boxer who was managed by Shelly Finkel. Alex Ramos later went on to win the International Boxing Federation USBA Middleweight title when he defeated Curtis Parker in 1984.

After Ramos's retirement, he fell victim to alcohol/substance abuse and found himself living on the streets, which ultimately led to Ramos entering rehab. He then went on to form the Retired Boxer's Foundation (a non-profit foundation) with the help of Jacquie Richardson.

== Amateur career ==
Ramos had an amateur record of 143-15 (132 KOs). Ramos won four New York Golden Gloves Championships. Ramos won the 1977 147 lb Sub-Novice Championship, defeating Julian Kelly in the finals; the 1978 160 lb Open Championship over Norberto Sabater; the 1979 160 lb Open Championship over Noel Tucker and the 1980 156 lb Open Championship over Ramon Nieto. Ramos trained at the Jerome Boxing Club in the Bronx, New York, in 1977 and 1978. In 1979 and 1980 Ramos trained at the Bronxchester Boys Club in the Bronx, New York.

Ramos's amateur career highlights include winning the 1979 National Amateur Athletic Union Championship for the 165 lb division and the 1979 Intercity Golden Gloves in the 156 lb. division.

Ramos originally intended to fly on LOT Polish Airlines Flight 7, where several of his teammates were killed, but stayed to participate in the 1980 National Golden Gloves.

== Professional boxing career ==
Ramos began his professional boxing career on November 8, 1980, by defeating Steve Arvin by a fifth round knockout in Stateline, Nevada.

Ramos won his first five fights by knockout. These bouts included four fights in the eastern United States and one in Texas. On March 28, 1981, in Syracuse, New York, Dan Snyder became the first boxer to go the scheduled distance with Ramos, who beat Snyder by a six-round decision.

On May 23, 1981, Ramos had his first professional fight abroad when he beat Donnie Long by an eight rounds decision in San Remo, Italy. His next fight, on June 21 of the same year, marked his Atlantic City debut, when he defeated Mike Sacchetti, also by an eight rounds decision. Ramos would fight in Atlantic City several times during his career.

Ramos won six more fights, including a victory over Norberto Sabater, before suffering his first loss, being knocked out in round eight by Ted Sanders on August 18, 1982, in Atlantic City. He then fought Tony Cerda to a ten-round draw (tie) on December 22.

After those two setbacks, however, Ramos became a ranked middleweight by virtue of three straight victories, including a ten-round decision over future world light-heavyweight champion J.B. Williamson on May 1 in Atlantic City. Despite losing his next fight, against future world super middleweight champion Murray Sutherland by a ten-round decision, Ramos was by then held along with the highest ranked middleweights of the era, such as Mustafa Hamsho, Wilford Scypion, Juan Roldán, John Mugabi, Curtis Parker and others.

After knocking out Wilbur Henderson in three rounds on February 8, 1984, in Atlantic City, Ramos challenged Parker for his first career title, the regional, United States Boxing Association Middleweight championship. He won the title by beating Parker over twelve rounds by a unanimous decision on April 25 of that year, in Atlantic City.

A world title fight against Marvin Hagler probably loomed ahead for Ramos after his victory over Parker. Many fans in the United States took interest in Ramos thanks in part to coverage by such magazines as the Ring and KO, and his career was also covered in Puerto Rico by newspapers such as El Nuevo Dia and El Vocero. A ten-round draw against fringe contender John Collins, however, proved to be the first obstacle for that match to take place. The second, and arguably largest, obstacle for Ramos to challenge Hagler for the World Middleweight Championship came when he lost his USBA Middleweight title, on November 24, by a knockout in round nine against James Kinchen (who years later lost to Thomas Hearns over twelve rounds in a WBO world title bout) in Stateline.

In 1984, Ramos relocated to Scottsdale, Arizona.

After losing to Kinchen, Ramos got back on the contender's list by winning four out of his next five bouts, which included victories over J.J. Cotrell and former Thomas Hearns challenger Fred Hutchings, whom he knocked out in five rounds on August 16, 1986, in Stockton, California.

This victory gave him a try for the California state middleweight title, held by future world champion Michael Nunn. The two boxers met on November 21 in Reseda, with Nunn gaining a twelve-round decision.

After winning two of his three next fights, and after Nunn had vacated the belt, Ramos got a second chance to win the California win. This time, he was knocked out in eight rounds by Tim Williams.

After another victory, Ramos got his third chance at the California Middleweight title, being outpointed by Alphonso Long after twelve rounds on February 3, 1988.

Ramos won ten of his next twelve bouts over the next six years, finally earning him a shot for another middleweight title. On November 5, 1994, he fought Jorge Fernando Castro in Argentina for the WBA Middleweight title. He defeated Ramos by a second-round knockout. Ramos is now retired.

== Professional boxing record ==
39 Wins (24 knockouts, 15 decisions), 10 Losses (6 knockouts, 4 decisions), 2 Draws
Result	Record	Opponent	Type	Round	Date	Location	Notes
Loss	94-4-2	(Argentina) Jorge Fernando Castro	KO	2	05/11/1994	Gimnasio Municipal, Caleta Olivia, Argentina	WBA World Middleweight Title. Ramos knocked out at 1:13 of the second round.
Win	0-8	(United States) Anthony Montana	TD	5	06/09/1994	Memphis, Tennessee, United States	
Win	1-13-1	(United States) Larry McFadden	TKO	2	27/08/1994	Veteran's Coliseum, Cedar Rapids, Iowa, United States	
Win	4-14	(United States) Willie Perry	UD	8	15/08/1994	Fort Mitchell, Kentucky, United States	
Win	0-1	(United States) Steve "Cleveland" Brown	KO	2	18/07/1994	Louisville, Kentucky, United States	
Win	22-19-1	(United States) Steve Langley	UD	10	08/06/1994	Pico Rivera, California, United States	
Win	0-3	(United States) James "Pitch" Black	KO	4	02/05/1994	Kansas City, Kansas, United States	
Win	10-2-2	(United States) Sean "Match Maker" Gibbons	TKO	5	30/04/1994	Lincoln, Nebraska, United States	
Win	19-100-3	(United States) Reggie Strickland	PTS	8	25/04/1994	Des Moines, Iowa, United States	
Win	1-11	(United States) Billy Pryor	TKO	2	07/04/1994	Council Bluffs, Iowa, United States	
Loss	9-1	(Ecuador) Segundo Mercado	TKO	4	09/02/1991	(New York (state)) Madison Square Garden, New York City, United States	Referee stopped the bout at 1:07 of the fourth round.
Win	16-11-1	(United States) Roberto Rosiles	TKO	5	27/11/1990	Reseda Country Club, Reseda, California, United States	
Win	11-8	(Cuba) Ali Sanchez	PTS	10	30/10/1990	Reseda Country Club, Reseda, California, United States	
Loss	21-6-2	(United States) Al "Bumblebee" Long	PTS	12	03/02/1988	Riverside, California, United States	California Light Middleweight Title.
Win	10-7-3	(United States) Roderick Starks	UD	10	03/12/1987	Marriott Hotel, Irvine, California, United States	96-93, 98-92, 96-93.
Loss	12-3-1	(United States) Tim "Modern Outsider" Williams	TKO	8	29/09/1987	Reseda Country Club, Reseda, California, United States	California Middleweight Title.
Loss	25-1	(United States) Darnell "Hard" Knox	TKO	10	11/08/1987	Bally's Las Vegas, Las Vegas, Nevada, United States	
Win	18-6	(United States) Charles "Machine Gun" Carter	UD	10	29/04/1987	Sportsman of Stanislaus Club, Modesto, California, United States	
Win	10-4	(United States) Ron "Mitch" Daniels	KO	2	31/03/1987	Reseda Country Club, Reseda, California, United States	Daniels knocked out at 0:57 of the second round.
Loss	19-0	(United States) Michael Nunn	UD	12	21/11/1986	Reseda Country Club, Reseda, California, United States	California Middleweight Title. 108-120, 108-120, 109-119.
Win	30-4	(United States) Fred "Pumper" Hutchings	KO	5	16/08/1986	Stockton, California, United States	
Loss	17-6	(United States) Charles "Machine Gun" Carter	PTS	10	08/05/1986	Oakland, California, United States	
Win	23-22-4	(United States) JJ Cottrell	KO	1	18/12/1985	Arco Arena, Sacramento, California, United States	
Win	5-1	(United States) Nathan Dryer	KO	7	12/07/1985	Phoenix, Arizona, United States	
Win	--	Karl Buchanan	KO	2	14/06/1985	Phoenix, Arizona, United States	
Loss	33-0-2	(United States) James "The Heat" Kinchen	KO	9	24/11/1984	Caesars Tahoe, Stateline, Nevada, United States	IBF USBA Middleweight Title. Ramos knocked out at 0:50 of the ninth round.
Draw	31-1	(United States) John "Jackie" Collins	PTS	10	10/06/1984	Depaul University Alumni Hall, Chicago, Illinois, United States	
Win	25-5	(United States) Curtis Parker	PTS	12	25/04/1984	Harrah's Atlantic City, Atlantic City, New Jersey, United States	IBF USBA Middleweight Title.
Win	12-6-2	(United States) Wilbur Henderson	KO	3	08/02/1984	Harrah's Atlantic City, Atlantic City, New Jersey, United States	
Win	6-2-2	(United States) Ronnie "Jackie" Robinson	KO	4	14/12/1983	Ice World, Totowa, New Jersey, United States	
Loss	39-10-1	(United Kingdom) Murray Sutherland	UD	10	13/09/1983	Playboy Hotel and Casino, Atlantic City, New Jersey, United States	
Win	19-13-3	(United States) James Waire	TKO	10	30/06/1983	Atlantic City, New Jersey, United States	
Win	13-0	(United States) JB Williamson	UD	10	01/05/1983	Atlantic City, New Jersey, United States	
Win	21-1	(United States) Mark Frazie	PTS	10	26/03/1983	Atlantic City, New Jersey, United States	
Draw	14-2-2	(United States) Tony Cerda	PTS	10	22/12/1982	Caesars Tahoe, Stateline, Nevada, United States	97-93, 95-95, 94-97.
Loss	8-15-4	(United States) Ted Sanders	KO	8	18/08/1982	Resorts Casino Hotel, Atlantic City, New Jersey, United States	
Win	21-2	(Canada) Wayne Caplette	KO	4	16/05/1982	Harrah's Atlantic City, Atlantic City, New Jersey, United States	
Win	6-4-1	(United States) Jimmy "Schoolboy" Baker	KO	5	19/04/1982	Resorts Casino Hotel, Atlantic City, New Jersey, United States	
Win	5-5	(United States) Charlie Hecker	KO	8	17/02/1982	(New York (state)) Westchester County Center, White Plains, New York, United States	
Win	20-1	(United States) Norberto Sabater	UD	10	14/11/1981	Sands Atlantic City, Atlantic City, New Jersey, United States	
Win	7-21-1	(Dominican Republic) Fermin Guzman	TKO	6 (10)	Oct 3, 1981	Bally's Atlantic City, Atlantic City, New Jersey, United States	
Win	10-4-1	(United States) Rocky Fabrizio	TKO	4	20/08/1981	Ice World, Totowa, New Jersey, United States	Referee stopped the bout at 0:44 of the fourth round.
Win	10-1	(United States) Mike Sacchetti	PTS	8	21/06/1981	Playboy Hotel and Casino, Atlantic City, New Jersey, United States	
Win	19-1	(United States) Danny Long	PTS	8	23/05/1981	Sanremo, Italy	
Win	8-3-1	(United States) "Dollar" Bill Tuttle	UD	8	16/04/1981	Ice World, Totowa, New Jersey, United States	
Win	12-14	(United States) "Dancin" Dan Snyder	PTS	6	28/03/1981	(New York (state)) Carrier Dome, Syracuse, New York, United States	
Win	22-7-1	(United States) Marciano Bernardi	TKO	2	08/02/1981	Playboy Club, McAfee, New Jersey, United States	
Win	1-2	(United States) Jose "Birdie" Pacheco	KO	5	16/01/1981	HemisFair Arena, San Antonio, Texas, United States	Pacheco knocked out at 0:41 of the fifth round.
Win	2-6	(United States) Leo "The Lion" Martinez	KO	1	20/12/1980	(New York (state)) Kingsbridge Armory, Bronx, New York, United States	
Win	3-28-1	(United States) Johnny "Reb" Davis	TKO	4	25/11/1980	Hartford Civic Center, Hartford, Connecticut, United States	
Win	12-3	(United States) Steve Arvin	KO	5	08/11/1980	Stateline, Nevada, United States	

== Life after boxing ==
Ramos began working in the sport of boxing doing other things inside the sport. In 1998, he established the Retired Boxers Foundation whose mission is to assist retired professional boxers in the transition from their glorious days in the ring to a dignified retirement. Among other celebrities who became involved in the organizations are Bo Derek, Mickey Rooney, Lolita Davidovich, Col. Bob Sheridan, Ron Shelton, James Carville and many others.

In February 1999, Alberto Lugo, whom Ramos had known as a neighbor in his youth, was arrested and charged with the assault of three women. When arrested, he told the police he was Alex Ramos. The alleged impostor was found guilty of rape, sodomy and kidnapping. Ramos' private life was severely affected by the Lugo case: since Lugo had told detectives that he was Alex Ramos, many people actually believed Ramos to be a rapist. After Lugo was sentenced and publicly identified as Alberto Lugo, however, Ramos' name was cleared from any rape suspicions.

Ramos relocated to Simi Valley, California, where he lived for a long period before returning to New York to begin the Retired Boxers Foundation. While in Simi Valley, he struggled with drugs and alcohol, but he was able to successfully recover from both addictions.

Ramos had a professional boxing record of 39 wins, 10 losses and 2 draws, with 24 wins by knockout.
