= Julio Gervacio =

Dominican Republic boxer (born 1967)

Julio Antonio Gervacio (born 1967) is a former boxer and world Super Bantamweight champion from the Dominican Republic.

As a child, he relocated to Puerto Rico. He always expressed pride in his national background; and he considered himself a Dominican-Puerto Rican. In fact, he usually took both the flags of Puerto Rico and the Dominican Republic to most of his fights.

== Boxing career ==
Gervacio had an award-winning amateur boxing career. His professional career as a boxer took off on December 21, 1985, after he knocked out Felix Llanos during the first round at Caguas. After two more wins, he participated, alongside Juan Carazo, at an undercard held in Curaçao on May 30, 1986.

On June 22, he knocked out Pedro Arroyo in three rounds, as part of an undercard headlined by Azumah Nelson's successful world Featherweight championship defense against Gervacio's Dominican countryman Danilo Cabrera. That win triggered off a streak of fourteen wins in a row, twelve of them by knockout, including a tenth-round knockout over future Fabrice Benichou and Welcome Ncita world title challenger Ramon "Panadero" Cruz, leading Gervacio to a match for the world championship.

WBA world Super Bantamweight champion Louie Espinoza of Phoenix, Arizona, had defeated boxer Tommy Valoy by a knockout after a four-round match at the Arizona Veterans Memorial Coliseum to win the vacant world title. Many fans attended the November 27, 1987, world championship fight between Gervacio and Espinoza. Gervacio became a world champion by defeating Espinoza with a relatively close (scores of 117–114, 116-113 and 116–112) but unanimous decision over Espinoza at San Juan's Roberto Clemente Coliseum.

On his first attempt to defend his newly acquired title, his undefeated record and world title were lost to Bernardo Pinango after a split decision (scores of 113–114, 114-115 and 114–113).

Despite reeling off four wins in a row after his first defeat, Gervacio's career began to slide after losing to Pinango. In his next world title attempt for the world Super Bantamweight title, he lost by a twelve-round unanimous decision to Kenny Mitchell on April 29, 1989.

At his next bout held in Yabucoa, Puerto Rico on December 15, 1989, he lost by knockout for the first time in his career, sustaining a broken jaw and requiring hospitalization after being defeated by Orlando Fernandez after nine-round match. The days following the fight, Gervacio had to undergo reconstructive jaw surgery, having to be fed with intravenous cables.

Although he would never regain his title, Gervacio nevertheless reeled off ten straight wins after that defeat. Among the boxers he beat during that streak were some top ranked fighters such as former Jiro Watanabe world title challenger Julio Soto Solano, Pepillo Valdez, Lee Cargle and Lorenzo Tiznado, among others.

When given another chance to win a world title on March 11 of 1995, he lost to WBC Super Bantamweight incumbent Hector Acero Sanchez by a twelve-round unanimous decision.

His next fight on March 25, 1996, against Sergio Pena was his debut in his birth country and it was for the Dominican Super Bantamweight title. It resulted in a seven-round no contest decision. Gervacio lost his next three matches all by knockout, including one against future world champion Juan Manuel Márquez

At his final professional match held on October 4, 1997, he lost to former Cuban amateur boxer and future world champion Joel Casamayor. Gervacio retired with a record of 32 wins, 7 losses and 1 draw, with 24 wins by knockout.

== Illegal immigration arrest ==
On June 20, 2011, Gervacio, who identified himself as Julio Antonio Gervacio-Lynch, was arrested in Aguadilla, Puerto Rico by U.S. Customs and Border Protection officers after he illegally entered Puerto Rico (and thus also the United States) after crossing the Mona Channel that separates the island from the Dominican Republic aboard a rickety fishing boat commonly known as a yola by locals. Criminal and immigration records showed that Gervacio was convicted by a New York court in 2002 for conspiracy to distribute narcotics and was deported from the United States by orders from an immigration judge in 2009. The cases, including Gervacio-Lynch’s, were handed over to the U.S. Attorney’s Office for the District of Puerto Rico. While illegal re-entry after deportation can result in up to 20 years in prison—subject to an individual's criminal record—his specific sentencing details remain undisclosed in public records. The operation also led to the arrest of two U.S. citizens accused of harboring and transporting the group, underscoring ongoing federal crackdowns on human smuggling in the area.

Preceded by Louie Espinoza	WBA Super Bantamweight Champion; 28 Nov 1987– 27 Feb 1988	Succeeded by Bernardo Pinango
