= Welcome Ncita =

South African boxer

Personal information
- Nickname: The Hawk
- Nationality: South African
- Born: 25 October 1965 (age 60) Mdantsane, South Africa
- Height: 5 ft 5.5 in (1.66 m)

Boxing career
- Stance: Southpaw

Boxing record
- Total fights: 44
- Wins: 40
- Win by KO: 21
- Losses: 3
- Draws: 1

Welcome Ncita (born 21 October 1965) is a South African retired professional boxer and former IBF Super Bantamweight Champion.

== Professional career ==
Known as "The Hawk", Ncita turned professional in 1984 and in 1990 captured the International Boxing Federation Super Bantamweight Title with a victory over Fabrice Benichou in a bout that took place in Tel Aviv. Ncita defended the title six times before losing it to Kennedy McKinney in 1992. He lost a rematch by decision to McKinney in 1994, a fight in which McKinney was knocked down in round five, but Ncita's left eye swelled shut midway through the bout. Ncita retired in 1998. Welcome therefore had settled with his wife Noletu Ncita who is a Master Practitioner in Real Estate(MPRE) and the owner of Noletu Ncita Properties which had recently started in January 2023. Welcome and Noletu have an elder son Ray ncita and three daughters, Brewell Ncita, Latoya Ncita and Buhle Ncita.

== Professional boxing record ==
44 fights	40 wins	3 losses
By knockout	21	2
By decision	19	1
Draws	1	

No.	Result	Record	Opponent	Type	Round, time	Date	Location	Notes
44	Draw	40–3–1	Steve Robinson	SD	12	3 Oct 1998	Sisa Dukashe Stadium, East London, South Africa	For WBO Inter-Continental featherweight title
43	Loss	40–3	Héctor Lizárraga	RTD	10 (12), 3:00	13 Dec 1997	Amphitheater, Pompano Beach, Florida, U.S.	For vacant IBF featherweight title
42	Win	40–2	Narciso Valenzuela Romo	KO	3 (10), 1:34	25 Jan 1997	Carousel Casino, Hammanskraal, South Africa	
41	Win	39–2	Mike Deveney	PTS	8	29 Jun 1996	Fort Hare University Hall, Alice, South Africa	
40	Win	38–2	Manuel Santiago	UD	10	2 Apr 1996	Civic Center, Providence, Rhode Island, U.S.	
39	Win	37–2	Peter Harris	TKO	3 (10)	26 Sep 1995	Carousel Casino, Hammanskraal, South Africa	
38	Win	36–2	Carlos Rocha	KO	1 (10)	10 Jun 1995	Fort Hare University Hall, Alice, South Africa	
37	Win	35–2	Roberto Apolinario Godoy	KO	2 (10), 2:46	1 Apr 1995	Superbowl, Sun City, South Africa	
36	Loss	34–2	Kennedy McKinney	MD	12	16 Apr 1994	Convention Centre, South Padre Island, Texas, U.S.	For IBF super bantamweight title
35	Win	34–1	Kenny Mitchell	KO	2 (10)	19 Feb 1994	Carousel Casino, Hammanskraal, South Africa	
34	Win	33–1	Eddie Rangel	TKO	3 (10), 1:38	16 Oct 1993	Caesars Tahoe, Stateline, Nevada, U.S.	
33	Loss	32–1	Kennedy McKinney	KO	11 (12), 2:48	2 Dec 1992	Teatro Tenda, Tortolì, Italy	Lost IBF super bantamweight title
32	Win	32–0	Jesus Salud	UD	12	18 Apr 1992	Palazzetto dello Sport, Treviolo, Italy	Retained IBF super bantamweight title
31	Win	31–0	Sugar Baby Rojas	SD	12	18 Sep 1991	Superbowl, Sun City, South Africa	Retained IBF super bantamweight title
30	Win	30–0	Hurley Snead	UD	12	15 Jun 1991	HemisFair Arena, San Antonio, Texas, U.S.	Retained IBF super bantamweight title
29	Win	29–0	Sugar Baby Rojas	SD	12	27 Feb 1991	Casino de la Vallee, Saint-Vincent, Italy	Retained IBF super bantamweight title
28	Win	28–0	Gerardo López	KO	8 (12), 2:14	29 Sep 1990	Pallazzo del Ghiacchio, Aosta, Italy	Retained IBF super bantamweight title
27	Win	27–0	Ramón Cruz	TKO	7 (12), 2:04	2 Jun 1990	Regatta Club, Rome, Italy	Retained IBF super bantamweight title
26	Win	26–0	Fabrice Benichou	UD	12	10 Mar 1990	Hilton Hotel, Tel Aviv, Israel	Won IBF super bantamweight title
25	Win	25–0	Vidal Téllez	RTD	5 (10)	5 Aug 1989	Superbowl, Sun City, South Africa	
24	Win	24–0	Miguel Pequeno	TKO	5 (10)	2 Jul 1989	Stadio Ezio Scida, Crotone, Italy	
23	Win	23–0	Julio César Cardona	KO	3 (10)	6 May 1989	Stadio Nicola De Simone, Syracuse, Italy	
22	Win	22–0	Jaime Olvera	TKO	2 (8)	18 Dec 1988	Expo Center, Orlando, Florida, U.S.	
21	Win	21–0	Juan Rodríguez	UD	10	4 Jun 1988	Standard Bank Arena, Johannesburg, South Africa	
20	Win	20–0	Lincoln Salcedo	TKO	7 (10), 0:10	20 Feb 1988	Gimnasio Nuevo Panama, Panama City, Panama	
19	Win	19–0	Johannes Miya	PTS	12	4 Oct 1987	Feather Market Hall, Port Elizabeth, South Africa	Retained South African flyweight title
18	Win	18–0	Johannes Miya	PTS	10	23 Jun 1987	Standard Bank Arena, Johannesburg, South Africa	
17	Win	17–0	Victor Sonaba	UD	12	26 Apr 1987	Mdantsane Stadium, East London, South African	Retained South African flyweight title
16	Win	16–0	Lee Cargle	UD	10	7 Feb 1987	Superbowl, Sun City, South Africa	
15	Win	15–0	Alex Miranda	PTS	8	22 Nov 1986	Rand Stadium, Johannesburg, South Africa	
14	Win	14–0	Ricky Diaz	KO	3 (8), 2:18	30 Oct 1986	Civic Center, Hartford, Connecticut, U.S.	
13	Win	13–0	Kirk Morris	TKO	7 (12)	31 Mar 1986	Mdantsane Stadium, East London, South Africa	Retained South African flyweight title
12	Win	12–0	Johannes Miya	SD	12	15 Mar 1986	Feather Market Hall, Port Elizabeth, South Africa	Won South African flyweight title
11	Win	11–0	Fraser Ndzandze	TKO	7 (10)	30 Nov 1985	Mdanstane Stadium, East London, South Africa	Won Cape flyweight title
10	Win	10–0	Basil Ndlazulwana	TKO	2 (6)	1 Jun 1985	Mdantsane Stadium, East London, South Africa	
9	Win	9–0	Thembisile Koti	TKO	3 (6)	1 Jun 1985	Mdantsane Stadium, East London, South Africa	
8	Win	8–0	Gilbert Makenete	PTS	6	18 May 1985	Independence Stadium, Mthatha, South Africa	
7	Win	7–0	Xolile Krabane	TKO	5 (6)	9 Feb 1985	Community Hall, Duncan Village, South Africa	
6	Win	6–0	Cosmo Ziqu	PTS	6	8 Dec 1984	BRU Grounds, East London, South Africa	
5	Win	5–0	Sizwe Jokiwe	TKO	3 (4)	8 Sep 1984	Community Hall, Duncan Village, South Africa	
4	Win	4–0	Mxolisi Majaja	PTS	4	21 Jul 1984	Community Hall, Duncan Village, South Africa	
3	Win	3–0	Mandisi Zangqa	TKO	3 (4)	19 May 1984	Msobomvu Hall, Butterworth, South Africa	
2	Win	2–0	Bisto Rulashe	PTS	4	5 May 1984	Zwelitsha Community Hall, King William's Town, South Africa	
1	Win	1–0	Vuyani Mgxaso	PTS	4	31 Mar 1984	Community Hall, Duncan Village, South Africa	

Achievements
Preceded by Fabrice Benichou	IBF Super Bantamweight Champion; 10 Mar 1990– 2 Dec 1992	Succeeded by Kennedy McKinney
