= Felix Camacho (boxer) =

Puerto Rican professional boxer

Personal information
- Nickname: Showtime
- Born: Felix Camacho Matías; June 27, 1966 (age 60) Bayamón, Puerto Rico
- Weight: Super bantamweight

Boxing career

Boxing record
- Total fights: 26
- Wins: 20
- Win by KO: 7
- Losses: 6

Felix Camacho Matías (born June 27, 1966, in Bayamón, Puerto Rico) is a Puerto Rican former professional boxer. A one time world title challenger, he is the younger brother of the better known, International Boxing Hall of Fame member Hector Camacho and the uncle of Hector Camacho Jr. He won a minor championship from the WBF, an organization with little recognition among boxing experts, personalities and fans worldwide.

Camacho's boxing nickname is "Showtime".

== Professional boxing career ==
Camacho began his professional boxing career on June 25, 1988, beating the 1 win, 3 losses Dan Fiello by four rounds decision in a bout that was refereed by Steve Smoger, at the Tropicana Hotel and Casino in Atlantic City, New Jersey, as part of a boxing show headlined by a contest between his brother Hector and Reyes Cruz.

Camacho had his home country debut on his second fight, when he faced 1 win, 8 losses Jaime Castellano on October 22, 1988, in Bayamón, as part of another undercard headlined by his older brother Hector. Camacho won by four rounds decision.

Camacho won his first nine bouts; with four of those wins by knockout. In the process, he recorded his first professional knockout victory in his fourth professional contest, when he beat Cuban Tony Frontela, a fighter with a 2 wins, 2 losses record, at the Sonesta Sanibel Harbour Resort at Fort Myers, Florida, on June 11, 1989, by a fifth-round technical knockout.

On January 29, 1990, the 9 wins, 0 losses Camacho boxed at the Trump Plaza Hotel and Casino in Atlantic City, being defeated in a minor upset, by the 7 wins, 11 losses and 4 draws (ties) Sammy Ruiz by a six rounds judges' majority decision. One judge scored the fight a tie, while the two others saw Ruiz win it, therefore giving Camacho his first defeat as a professional boxer.

Two more wins followed his first loss before Camacho scored what was perhaps the biggest win of his career: faced with the then 4 wins, 10 losses and 2 ties Darryl Pinckney, Camacho scored a 12 rounds split-decision points win, with two judges seeing him as the winner and one seeing him as the loser, to lift the Florida State Super Bantamweight championship on June 30, 1990, at the Lee County Civic Center in North Fort Myers. Despite finishing his career with a losing record, Pinckney scored big wins over world champions Prudencio Cardona, Junior Jones and Guty Espadas Jr.

On November 27, 1991, Camacho boxed with José "Yungo" Badillo, who was undefeated in seven previous contests, in San Juan. He lost to Badillo by an extremely close, eight rounds unanimous decision, losing by one point on two of the judges' scorecards and by two on the third card. Badillo would later challenge Tom Johnson and Naseem Hamed for world championships, losing to both.

After one win following the Badillo loss, Camacho met the 12-3 Mexican, Alberto Cepeda, for the WBF Super-Bantamweight championship, on May 27, 1992, in San Juan. Camacho won the lightly regarded title by a ninth-round knockout.

Camacho then fought Orlando Fernandez, a former WBO world Super-Bantamweight champion, on September 4, 1992, at San Juan. Camacho lost a relatively close but unanimous ten rounds decision to his 13 wins, 5 losses opponent in a contest which the WBF did not regard as a championship fight. The closeness and competitiveness of their first bout led Camacho and Fernandez to have a rematch soon afterwards, this time with Camacho's WBF Super Bantamweight title on the line. Their rematch was held on December 9, 1992, in San Juan and this time, Fernandez won more comprehensively, winning by a twelve-rounds unanimous decision by scores of 117–112 on two of the judges' scorecards and 116–112 on the third one.

== World title fight ==
Two wins followed the second loss to Fernandez, and then, Camacho was ranked in the Super Bantamweight division by the IBF, one of boxing's four major recognized world championship organizations. In November 1994, Camacho traveled to South Africa, where on November 19 of that year, he challenged IBF world champion, the 24 wins, 2 losses Vuyani Bungu at the Carousel Casino at Hammanskraal. Camacho won a couple of rounds on the judges' scorecards, but he still lost by a twelve rounds unanimous decision, with scores of 119–110, 117-111 and 118–111, all against him.

== Rest of career ==
Camacho fought sporadically after his world title try. In the next sixteen years, he held four contests, winning three and losing his last one, which was held when he was 44 years old already, on September 11, 2009, against the 5 wins, 2 losses and 1 draw Adrian Perez. Camacho, who had been without a fight for almost one decade, lost that fight by six rounds unanimous decision, at the Fort Myers Skatium in Fort Myers.

== Professional boxing record ==
Camacho won 20 and lost 6 of his fights, with 7 wins and 0 losses by knockout.

== Run ins with the law ==
In 2005, Camacho was convicted of 12 burglary and grand theft charges and sentenced to five years in jail.

Camacho was later sentenced to fifteen years in jail for burglary and theft.

== Health problems ==
Camacho suffers from residual head trauma and dementia related to his boxing career.

== Personal life ==
Camacho dated a woman named Betsy Santiago. He has two children.
