= Poonsawat Kratingdaenggym =

Thai boxer

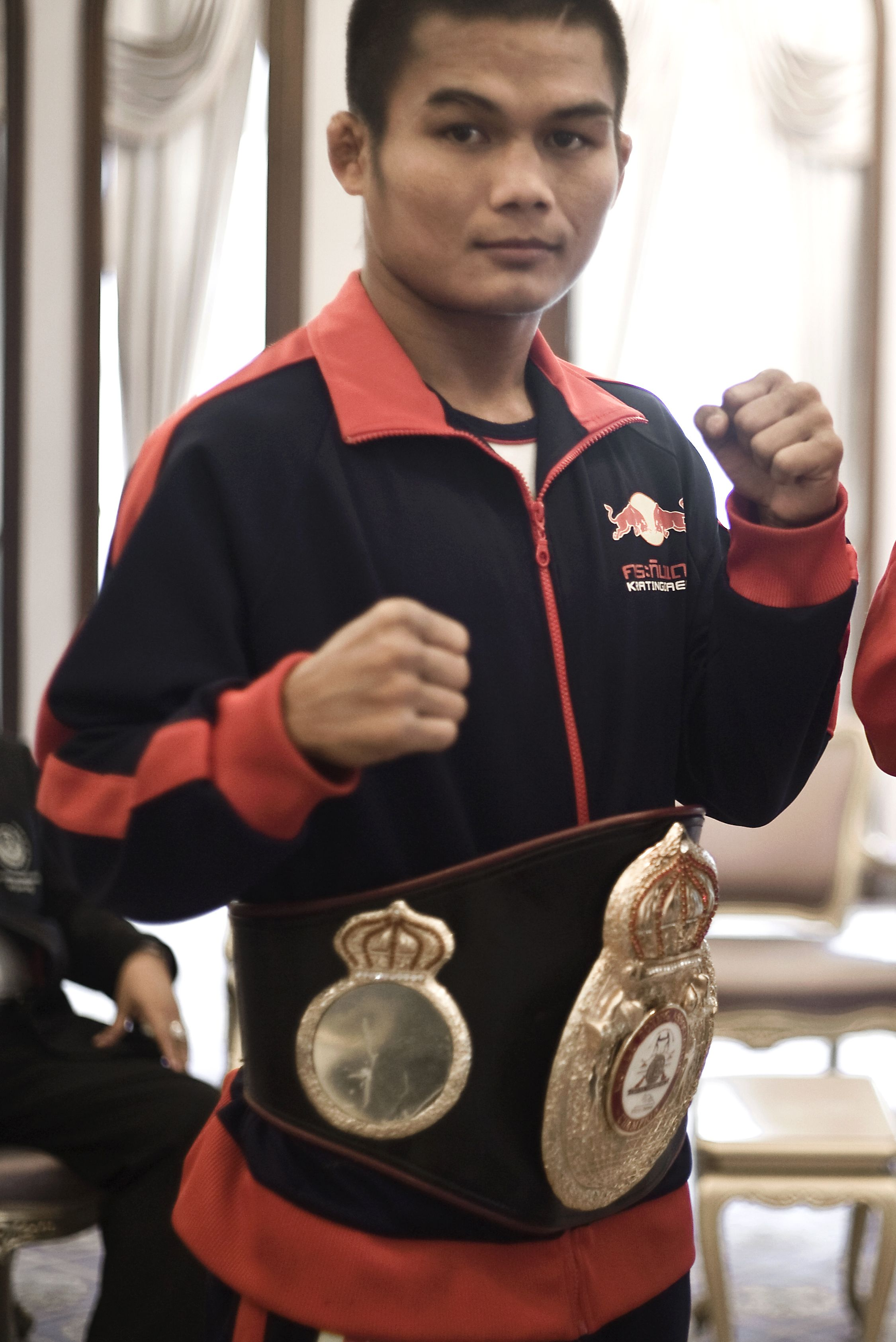

Personal information
- Nicknames: Thaipoon; The Junior Tank ("ไอ้รถถังจูเนียร์"); Thai Tycoon
- Born: Chalermwong Udomna; 20 November 1980 (age 45) Amphoe Phu Phan, Sakon Nakhon Province, Thailand
- Weight: Bantamweight; Super bantamweight

Boxing career
- Stance: Orthodox

Boxing record
- Total fights: 44
- Wins: 42
- Win by KO: 30
- Losses: 2
- Draws: 0
- No contests: 0

Chalermwong Udomna (Thai: เฉลิมวงศ์ อุดมนา; formerly Prakob Udomna (ประกอบ อุดมนา)), who boxes as Poonsawat Kratingdaenggym, (พูนสวัสดิ์ กระทิงแดงยิม; born 20 November 1980) is a retired professional boxer from Thailand who fought in the Super bantamweight (also known as Junior featherweight) division. He is a former WBA Regular Bantamweight and Super Bantamweight World Champion, and a former PABA regional Bantamweight and Superbantamweight.

== Career ==
Poonsawat fought under the management of Niwat Laosuwanwat, who also managed legendary Thai boxer Khaosai Galaxy, the former WBA Junior bantamweight World Champion.

On 26 September 2009 Poonsawat defeated Irish boxer Bernard Dunne in the 3rd round to claim the WBA World Super bantamweight title. Then Poonsawat defended his title two more times until May 2010.

On 2 October 2010 Poonsawat lost to Ryol Li Lee in a stunning upset. This was his first loss since July 2006 against Volodymyr Sydorenko.

Poonsawat was scheduled to face Cuba's Guillermo Rigondeaux in an attempt to regain the WBA Super bantamweight title. However, on 14 December 2012, following Olympic-style drug testing, he failed a medical examination and was ruled unfit to compete. Initial rumors suggested he had tested positive for HIV, but it was later confirmed that he was suffering from thalassemia, a blood disorder that impairs red blood cell function and causes anemia. As a result, his boxing career came to an end.

== See also ==
- List of WBA world champions
- List of super bantamweight boxing champions

Sporting positions
Interim World boxing titles
Vacant Title last held by Julio Zarate	WBA bantamweight champion Interim title 31 August 2005 – 15 July 2006; Lost bid for WBA title	Vacant Title next held by Nehomar Cermeno
Vacant Title last held by Ricardo Cordoba	WBA super-bantamweight champion Interim title April 30, 2009 – September 26, 2009; Won Regular title	Vacant Title next held by Guillermo Rigondeaux
World boxing titles
Preceded by Bernard Dunne	WBA super-bantamweight champion Regular title September 26, 2009 – 2 October 2010	Succeeded by Ryol Li Lee
