= Teiken Boxing Gym =

Japanese traditional boxing club

Teiken Boxing Gym 帝拳ボクシングジム
- Formation: 1926; 100 years ago
- Type: Japan-based boxing club
- Legal status: Active
- Headquarters: Tokyo, Japan
- Location: Kagurazaka, Shinjuku, Tokyo
- Coordinates: 35°42′3″N 139°44′32.3″E
- Official language: Japanese (Note: Nobu Ikushima and Akemi Irie have served as Las Vegas-based U.S. coordinator for Teiken Promotions over years.)
- Founder: Sadayuki Ogino
- Founding president: Munehide Tanabe
- Current president: Akihiko Honda
- Representative: Tsuyoshi Hamada
- Key people: Haru Nagano (manager); Isamu Kuwata (ex-trainer); Sendai Tanaka (ex-trainer); Yūichi Kasai (trainer); Shin Yamato (trainer)
- Website: TEIKEN.COM

The founder of Teiken Boxing Gym, Sadayuki Ogino (1901–1970), during his career as an active junior featherweight boxer.

Teiken Boxing Gym (帝拳ボクシングジム) is a Japanese traditional boxing club based in the Kagurazaka neighborhood of Shinjuku, Tokyo, Japan. Dating back to 1926, Teiken Boxing Gym manages professional boxers as a member of the East Japan Boxing Association (東日本ボクシング協会; abbreviated as JPBA-east), a subsidiary body of Japan Pro Boxing Association (日本プロボクシング協会; abbreviated as JPBA). (Note: In Japan, every professional boxer must contract with a manager under the Japan Boxing Commission rules, and is required to belong to a boxing gym which has exclusive management rights for boxers under the Japan's conventional gym system.) Its president is the International Boxing Hall of Famer Akihiko Honda (本田 明彦), its representative is Tsuyoshi Hamada (浜田 剛史), and the long-time female manager is Haru Nagano (長野 ハル). In order to distinguish from three related clubs i.e. Osaka Teiken Boxing Gym, Fukuoka Teiken Boxing Gym, and Hachinohe Teiken Boxing Gym, it is often referred to as "Teiken (Boxing) Gym in Tokyo" or "Tokyo's Teiken (Boxing) Gym".

Teiken Promotions Inc. in Sakae-chō, Kita, Tokyo, also headed by the boxing promoter Akihiko Honda, is the managerial and promotional company for the Teiken Boxing Gyms and other worldwide professional boxers, as well as supervising the boxers' training. While Teiken Promotions has so far directed world champions such as Jirō Watanabe who belonged to Osaka Teiken Boxing Gym, (Note: In addition to Watanabe, Takuya Muguruma and Jōichirō Tatsuyoshi belonged to Osaka Teiken Boxing Gym which was established in January 1964 by its founder president Kiyoshi Yoshii who learned the know-how of the management of the boxing gym from Akira Honda, and whose son Hiroshi Yoshii succeeded the president in March 2005.) Genaro Hernández, David Griman, José Luis Bueno, Eloy Rojas, César Bazán, Alexander Muñoz, Edwin Valero, Román González et al., Teiken Boxing Gym has brought up similarly the world champions Masao Ōba, Tsuyoshi Hamada, Jorge Linares, Toshiaki Nishioka, Takahiro Aō, Akifumi Shimoda, Shinsuke Yamanaka, Toshiyuki Igarashi, Takashi Miura et al.

Besides, Teiken Promotions has provided boxing television programs on Nippon Television (under the auspices of the Hochi Shimbun), Nittele G+ and WOWOW. This article primarily focuses on Teiken Boxing Gym in Tokyo, while featuring the major activities of Teiken Promotions.

== History ==
=== Early 20th century ===
When Yūjirō Watanabe (渡辺 勇次郎) who learned boxing in San Francisco, California, United States since 1906 to bring it to Japan established Nippon Kentō Club (日本拳闘倶楽部) as the first genuine boxing gym in Shimomeguro, Meguro, Tokyo on December 25, 1921, Sadayuki Ogino (荻野 貞行; born in Gunma Prefecture) whose father lived in the United States and who aimed at becoming a trading merchant while studying at Rikkyo University, started boxing there under Watanabe's management. Ogino, a right-handed boxer known by his quick spear-like cross, was recognized as the Japanese junior featherweight champion by Nippon Kentō Club in 1922. That was one of the first boxing titles in Japan authorized at two weight divisions. His professional record was 8–2 (1 KO) with 9 draws, 2 exhibition matches, and one more match whose result is unknown. Since the gym collapsed in the Great Kantō earthquake, Ogino went on a visit to Shanghai, China with three boxers in spite of Watanabe's objection, in 1924. That first overseas expedition for Japanese boxers became an opportunity for the birth of Teiken Boxing Gym. Ogino also appeared in the Japan's first boxing movie Tetsuwan (鉄腕) in 1926.

Teiken Boxing Gym separated from Nippon Kentō Club was founded under Ogino's direction as Teikoku Kentō Association Kendōsha (帝国拳闘協会拳道社), commonly shortened as Teikoku Kentō Association (帝国拳闘協会), in 1926. Evaluated as a good referee as well, Ogino also did the writing work. Munehide Tanabe (田邊 宗英; born in Yamanashi Prefecture, often written as 田辺 宗英) from Waseda University who became the president of the Korakuen Stadium later, and was also appointed as the first commissioner of the Japan Boxing Commission in April 1952, assumed the position of its founding president. Teiken Boxing Gym in Tokyo is the second oldest surviving boxing gym in Japan, next to Tokyo Kentōkai (東京拳闘会), as of December 2013.

After All-Japan Professional Kentō Association (全日本プロフェッショナル拳闘協会) for the establishment of championships and the development of professional boxers was formed in February 1931, as Teiken Boxing Gym, one of its members, declared their secession in April 1932, the association was divided into two factions. Since Matsutarō Shōriki who owned the Yomiuri Shimbun released that they would hold the Japan–France confrontation matches with inviting world-class boxers from France in April 1933, two factions were reintegrated as an All-Japan Kentō Federation (全日本拳闘連盟) which was dissolved in 1937.

=== Mid-20th century ===
The first president of Teiken Boxing Gym, Munehide Tanabe (1881–1957, in the middle of the back row). The two in the front row are Yoshio Shirai (on the left) and Pascual Pérez, at the reception for their world title match.

Then Akira Honda (本田 明), the founding manager of Teiken Boxing Gym, who also acted as the chief director of Japan Kentō Association (日本拳闘協会; established in 1946 and dissolved in 1952 after having renamed twice) from 1948 and the founder president of Japan Boxing Association (日本ボクシング協会; the predecessor of the current Japan Pro Boxing Association) from 1962, was inaugurated as the president of Teiken Boxing Gym.

The 1960s when the distinctive Japanese and OPBF champions (Note: In principle, the Japan Boxing Commission which is virtually the only governing body of Japan's professional boxing had recognized only the WBA, WBC and OPBF as legitimate governing organizations sanctioning championship bouts until April 2013.) such as Kazuo Takayama, Teruo Kosaka, Kenji Fukuchi, Makoto Watanabe and Morio Kaneda won popularity has been termed as the "Golden Age" of Teiken Boxing Gym, as well as Japan's boxing of the same time having been called so. Kazuo Takayama's first world title shot against Davey Moore attracted 20,000 spectators at the Korakuen Stadium in August 1960. Teruo Kosaka's third world title shot against Gabriel Elorde which was his last match was watched by the audience of 33,000 at the Araneta Coliseum in Quezon City, Philippines in June 1965. Today Yūjirō Watanabe, Sadayuki Ogino and Akira Honda are respectively referred to as "Father of Japanese Boxing", "Mother of Japanese Boxing" and "Emperor of Japanese Boxing".

=== Late 20th century ===
When Akira Honda died as the president of Teiken Boxing Gym in Tokyo in 1964, his son Akihiko Honda took possession of that post at the age of seventeen with the help of Haru Nagano. In 1970 when Honda was a Rikkyo University's student at the age of twenty-two, Masao Ōba managed by him gained the first world title for Teiken Boxing Gym in the flyweight division. He is the current president of Teiken Boxing Gym in Tokyo as well as Teiken Promotions.

Teiken Boxing Gym has continued a clear contractual relationship, the development of the boxers which does not give them a title shot in a hurry, and the steady promotion corresponding to each boxer's ability. They have given their boxers high rewards. As one example, Tsuyoshi Hamada's match fee for his second defense in July 1987 was 299,600 dollars in the amount of time.

Honda promoted two of Mike Tyson's fights for the world heavyweight title both at the Tokyo Dome. The number of spectators of the fight against Buster Douglas in 1990 was 51,600, while its audience rating was 38.3 percent. Jimmy Lennon Jr. handled the ring announcements. As for the fight against Tony Tubbs in 1988, the attendance was 51,000 and the rating was 28.8 percent. Those two fights hold the top two attendance records in Japan's boxing history. Realizing a first world title tripleheader in Japan in 1998, Honda continuously carried it out seven times until April 2013.

=== 2000s ===
World champions managed by Teiken Boxing Gym
- Masao Ōba: WBA flyweight
- Tsuyoshi Hamada: WBC junior welterweight
- Jorge Linares: WBC featherweight WBA super featherweight
- Toshiaki Nishioka: WBC super bantamweight
- Takahiro Aō: WBC super featherweight WBC featherweight
- Akifumi Shimoda: WBA super bantamweight
- Shinsuke Yamanaka: WBC bantamweight
- Toshiyuki Igarashi: WBC flyweight The Ring flyweight
- Takashi Miura: WBC super featherweight

Leading world champions promoted by Teiken Promotions
- Genaro Hernández: WBA super featherweight WBC super featherweight
- David Griman: WBA flyweight
- José Luis Bueno: WBC super flyweight
- Eloy Rojas: WBA featherweight
- César Bazán: WBC lightweight
- Alexander Muñoz: WBA super flyweight
- Edwin Valero: WBA super featherweight WBC lightweight
- Román González: WBA minimumweight WBA light flyweight
- Carlos Cuadras: WBC super flyweight

World champions from Osaka Teiken Boxing Gym promoted by Teiken Promotions
- Jirō Watanabe: WBA super flyweight WBC super flyweight
- Takuya Muguruma: WBA bantamweight
- Jōichirō Tatsuyoshi: WBC bantamweight

In March 2007 Teiken Boxing Gym in Tokyo announced Tsuyoshi Hamada would take office as the representative of Teiken Promotions, while Honda would promote their boxers in the international market as the president. Shortly thereafter, Naoki Matsuda who was then uncrowned scored an epoch-making victory by knocking out Rodolfo López in Cancún, Quintana Roo, Mexico.

When Takahiro Aō won the world title on March 12, 2009, Teiken Boxing Gym in Tokyo had simultaneously three active world champions. From that time, journalists of sports papers and others came to write it again as the "Golden Age" of Teiken Boxing Gym. However the fatal accident later mentioned in the section entitled #Two fatalities occurred during a Japanese title match just nine days after that, and Teiken Boxing Gym in Tokyo became comparatively estranged from worldly things.

At that time, the leading trainers in Teiken Boxing Gym in Tokyo were Sendai Tanaka and Yūichi Kasai. Tanaka who studied with the International Boxing Hall of Famer Amílcar Brusa is proficient in the Spanish language and had ever served as Marco Antonio Barrera's trainer. He guided Edwin Valero, Jorge Linares, Román González and Takahiro Aō to the world titles, while coaching the world title challengers Motoki Sasaki and Kōji Satō, the then Japanese champions Daisuke Nakagawa and Yoshihiro Kamegai, and the future world champion Carlos Cuadras et al. He also helped Yūichi Kasai. Kasai led Toshiaki Nishioka, Akifumi Shimoda, Toshiyuki Igarashi and Takashi Miura to their world titles, while training the former mixed martial artist Hiromitsu Miura et al. In addition, there are Shin Yamato, Yūji Nakano and several other trainers coaching boxers including the world champion Shinsuke Yamanaka, the future International champion Yasutaka Ishimoto and the current/former OPBF/Japanese champions. Since autumn 2009, Masahiko Nakamura has served as the strength and conditioning coach for the gym. He is responsible for trunk strengthening to balance their bodies.

The world title doubleheader on October 10, 2009, was also broadcast live on Azteca in Mexico, in addition to Japan and Venezuela.

=== 2010s ===
The world title doubleheader on April 30, 2010, was broadcast live in three countries, and that on October 24 of the same year was carried live on Japan's NTV and the United Kingdom's Sky Sports, and relayed also in Mexico, Venezuela and Nicaragua.

Although Takahiro Aō and Jorge Linares lost their world titles in the latter half of 2009, when Akifumi Shimoda became the sixth world champion for Teiken Boxing Gym in Tokyo in January 2011, there came to be three active world champions at the same time in the gym again. (Note: Two of them were in the same weight division. However, they had not been allowed to fight against each other under the conventional gym system.)

One month before the sixth world title tripleheader for Teiken Promotions in April 2011, Honda unofficially announced two plans in the mid-2011 for Akifumi Shimoda and Toshiaki Nishioka to fight in the United States. Soon after that, Tōhoku earthquake occurred. Confirming the intentions of all participating boxers in that tripleheader, Honda considered their safety at the top priority. Then, preparing for the blackout, he made effort to secure by themselves the necessary minimum electric power for the live telecast and for operating the venue facilities, in consultation with Nippon Television which would broadcast the fights. However, he decided to refund all previous tickets and change the venue from the Ryōgoku Kokugikan in Tokyo to the World Memorial Hall in Kobe, Hyōgo for the risk management. That tripleheader event was relayed in the United States, Argentina, Italy and other countries, in addition to Japan's NTV and Mexico's Televisa.

After that, Honda stated that it would be difficult for a while to hold events in Japan, due to power problems in the metropolitan area caused by the earthquake. In May of that year, Teiken Boxing Gym in Tokyo officially announced three matches from May through July in Mexico and the United States including Akifumi Shimoda's mandatory defense against Rico Ramos as the HBO televised co-main event to Paul Williams vs. Erislandy Lara at the Boardwalk Hall in Atlantic City, New Jersey, staged by Goossen Tutor Promotions in association with Golden Boy Promotions and Teiken Promotions. In July of the same year, they released a world title doubleheader featuring Toshiaki Nishioka and Román González at the MGM Grand Hotel and Casino in October, presented by Teiken Promotions in association with Top Rank and Zanfer Promotions. Since around that year, the gym has been more aggressively seeking opportunities for their boxers to fight outside Japan, while exploring new venues inside of the country. As of July 2012, they had had four reigning world champions. From the beginning of 2013, most of the leading boxers are often coached by Ismael Salas and Miguel Diaz in Las Vegas, Nevada.

== Two fatalities ==
On March 21, 2009, the minimumweight boxer of Teiken Boxing Gym in Tokyo, and Hosei University alumni Masatate Tsuji (born in 1978) lost his first title shot via a final round knockout in a ten-round bout in the thirtieth edition of the annual Japanese boxing series, the Champion Carnival at the Korakuen Hall. In October 2008, Tsuji who made a professional debut on October 19, 2002, had won the other annual series Japanese title elimination tournament nicknamed "The Strongest in Korakuen" (最強後楽園) with the winner becoming the next mandatory challenger against the Japanese titleholder at the Champion Carnival, after defeating Akira Yaegashi in its semi-final match. In the scores until the ninth round of his fight in March 2009, all three judges gave a five to six point advantage for Tsuji. However fizzled from around three quarters, he lost consciousness just after the fight. Although Tsuji was taken to the hospital directly from the ring of the Korakuen Hall by the ambulance to undergo craniotomy immediately due to the acute subdural hematoma, he died without regaining consciousness on March 24, 2009. His final records were 31–19 (10 KOs) in amateur bouts, and 12–2 (3 KOs) with 2 draws in professional bouts. Tsuji now rests in peace on the Seto Inland Sea coast in his home city Hiroshima. Prior to that, the former Japanese lightweight champion Nobuo Kobayashi (born in 1910) of Teiken Boxing Gym has become the first boxing fatality in Japan at the Koshien tennis court in Nishinomiya, Hyōgo on September 1, 1930. Therefore, that was the second death for Teiken Boxing Gym as a result of injuries suffered in the ring.

After Tsuji's fatality, Teiken Boxing Gym in Tokyo refrained from activities such as the advertisement and the recruitment of trainees, and closed their homepage. Besides, all six promising young boxers of Teiken Boxing Gym who had been slated to compete in the East Japan Rookie King Tournament in 2010, declined to participate in it. Such circumstances caused the criticism or the guess and even the rumor that Teiken Boxing Gym in Tokyo might close.

As Tsuyoshi Hamada told later, several boxers had fought wearing boxing shorts with Tsuji's name on them. Yoshihiro Kamegai and Shinsuke Yamanaka who both fought on the undercard of Tsuji's final match earned their first Japanese title shots wearing such shorts in the first half of 2010. Past the second death anniversary of Tsuji, Teiken Boxing Gym in Tokyo resumed the official website after the prior notice.

== World champions ==
Following above mentioned Masao Ōba (1970), Tsuyoshi Hamada won the world title in the junior welterweight division in 1986. While there were several multiple-time world title challengers such as Kazuo Takayama (1960, 1961), Teruo Kosaka (1962, 1964, 1965), Shūichi Hozumi (1983, 1986), Fujio Ozaki (1988, 1989), Shirō Yahiro (1993, 1996, 1998) and Yūichi Kasai (1994, 1996, 1997), no one got a world championship belt in Teiken Boxing Gym in Tokyo for about twenty-one years, although the boxers promoted by Honda such as Genaro Hernández (1991, 1997), David Griman (1992), José Luis Bueno (1993), Eloy Rojas (1993), César Bazán (1998), Alexander Muñoz (2002, 2007), Edwin Valero (2006, 2009), and Román González (2008, 2011) were crowned the world champions. On the other hand, in Osaka Teiken Boxing Gym, Jirō Watanabe (1982, 1984), Takuya Muguruma (1987) and Jōichirō Tatsuyoshi (1991, 1993, 1997) captured it from 1980s to 1990s. In those days, Teiken Boxing Gym in Tokyo's trainer Isamu Kuwata and Osaka Teiken Boxing Gym's trainer Jun'ichi Okubo were presented with the Eddie Townsend Award in 1992 and 1993, respectively.

Meantime, the boxers continued training under the supervision of Honda, and under the instruction of trainers including Yūichi Kasai who retired as a boxer in 1997 and Sendai Tanaka who signed a deal with Teiken Boxing Gym in Tokyo in May 2003. They have a strong solidarity as a team, where each individual loves the gym. Once Jorge Linares (2007, twice in 2008) earned his first world title shot in the featherweight division in Las Vegas, Nevada, (Note: Jorge Linares, accepting the invitation of Honda, has belonged to Teiken Boxing Gym in Tokyo since his professional debut in a six-round bout in Japan in 2002. Linares who signed a contract with Golden Boy Promotions in September 2009, is still managed by Teiken Boxing Gym in Tokyo. Teiken Promotions serves as a co-promoter in his matches in the United States.) Toshiaki Nishioka (2008), Takahiro Aō (2009, 2010), Akifumi Shimoda (2011), Shinsuke Yamanaka (2011), Toshiyuki Igarashi (2012) and Takashi Miura (2013) secured it.

== Bibliography ==
- Andre, Sam; Fleischer, Nat; Rafael, Don (December 2001). An Illustrated History of Boxing (2001/sixth revised and updated ed.). New York, New York: Citadel Press. pp. 284, 288, 335, 385, 389, 404, 407, 427, 429–430, 433, 444, 449. ISBN 978-0-8065-2201-2.
- Johnson, John; Long, Bill (February 2008). Tyson-Douglas: The Inside Story of the Upset of the Century. Herndon, Virginia: Potomac Books. pp. 9, 46. ISBN 9781597974806.
- McNeil, William F. (September 2014). The Rise of Mike Tyson, Heavyweight. Jefferson, North Carolina: McFarland & Company. pp. 219–220. ISBN 9781476618029.
- Boxing Magazineial department, ed. (May 31, 2002). 日本プロボクシング史 世界タイトルマッチで見る50年 (Japan Pro Boxing History – 50 Years of World Title Bouts) (in Japanese). Tokyo, Japan: Baseball Magazine Sha Co., Ltd. pp. 40, 75, 286, 291. ISBN 978-4-583-03695-3.
- Boxing Magazineial department, ed. (March 1, 2004). 日本プロボクシングチャンピオン大鑑 (in Japanese). Tokyo, Japan: Baseball Magazine Sha Co., Ltd. pp. 66, 67, 242, 289. ISBN 978-4-583-03784-4.
- Toshio Ninomiya (June 9, 2011). 3人の世界王者。帝拳ジム、最強の秘密. Sports Graphic Number. ナンバーノンフィクション99 (in Japanese). 32 (12). Tokyo, Japan: Bungeishunju: 80, 82–83.
- Boxing Beat editorial department (June 15, 2011). MACC Publications Inc (ed.). "帝拳ジムの海外進出戦略". Ironman. Boxing Beat (in Japanese) (special issue). Tokyo, Japan: Fitness Sports Co., Ltd.: 16–17.
- Boxing Beat editorial department (October 15, 2011). MACC Publications Inc (ed.). Ironman. Boxing Beat (in Japanese) (special issue). Tokyo, Japan: Fitness Sports Co., Ltd.: 15, 45.
