= Akihiko Honda =

Japanese professional boxing promoter (born 1947)

- Japanese: 本田 明彦
- Born: September 9, 1947 (age 79)
- Education: Rikkyo University (graduated in 1969)
- Occupation: Boxing promoter
- Years active: 1964–present
- Organization: Teiken Promotions
- Known for: Promotion of the two Mike Tyson fights against Tony Tubbs and James Douglas; Promoting boxers such as Masao Ōba, Jirō Watanabe, Genaro Hernández, Eloy Rojas, Jorge Linares, Edwin Valero and Román González among others
- Notable work: Hozumi Hasegawa vs. Fernando Montiel, Nonito Donaire vs. Toshiaki Nishioka, Nihito Arakawa vs. Omar Figueroa, etc.
- Television: World Premium Boxing on Nippon Television; Excite Match on WOWOW
- Parent: Akira Honda (father)
- Awards: International Boxing Hall of Fame
- Website: TEIKEN.COM

Akihiko Honda (本田 明彦, Honda Akihiko; born September 9, 1947) is a Japanese professional boxing promoter who was inducted into the World Boxing Hall of Fame in 2008, and was also selected as an inductee into the International Boxing Hall of Fame in 2009.

== 1964 to 1990s ==
Honda has served as the president of the Teiken Promotions and Teiken Boxing Gym in Tokyo, Japan since 1964. Honda's motto "Pro Deo et Patria" implying "for God and Country" in Latin phrase is also that of Rikkyo University (also known as St. Paul's University) which Teiken Boxing Gym's founder Sadayuki Ogino and Honda graduated from. At the age of twenty-two in 1970, Honda guided Masao Ōba to the world title, and later promoted the two of Mike Tyson's fights in 1988 and 1990. He also realized the first world title tripleheader in Japan in 1998.

In the 1990s, in addition to the world title fights of Genaro Hernández, Jose Luis Bueno, Eloy Rojas et al., Honda staged the fights of Yūichi Kasai (including his world title clash), Jōichirō Tatsuyoshi et al. in the United States. In 1999, Honda who was asked what to do to improve Japan's professional boxing responded as follows:

1. First and foremost, making good boxers. Good cards are unable to be made without them.
2. Raising awareness to consider boxing as an intellectual sport and to evaluate the technical aspects.
3. Educating trainers.
4. Creating an environment where boxers' efforts will be rewarded.
5. Official announcements of the match fees for that.
6. In addition, increasing the value of the Japanese titles.

— Akihiko Honda, =我がボクシング改革論, Nippon Sports Publishing Co., Ltd.

== 2000s to 2010s ==
While making contributions to those issues over years, Honda worked on the world title fights of Cesar Bazan (since the 1990s), Edwin Valero et al. in the 2000s. In July 2007, he sent Jorge Linares to Las Vegas, Nevada, to successfully fight for and win his first world title. He became the Japan's eighth world champion to be crowned across the sea. In April 2010, Honda arranged the de facto unification match Hozumi Hasegawa vs. Fernando Montiel. At that time, Montiel's WBO title was not at stake under the policies of the Japan Boxing Commission. Hasegawa had wished to move to the featherweight division from more than two months ago, but he asked Honda to negotiate saying that he wanted to fight against Montiel even if his match fee would decline (Honda actually did not do it though). The Japan's oldest surviving boxing journal Boxing Magazine placed that fight as the best card in Japan's boxing history as of April 2010. Montiel received the second highest purse following Mike Tyson among the world champions fought in Japan.

Honda-promoted Akifumi Shimoda, who was the tenth Japanese boxer to risk his world championship belt outside Japan, lost his world title at the Boardwalk Hall in Atlantic City in July 2011. Then Honda promoted the world title doubleheader headlined by Toshiaki Nishioka vs. Rafael Márquez at the MGM Grand Marquee Ballroom in Las Vegas in association with Top Rank and Zanfer Promotions in October 2011. Román González promoted by Honda also made his United States debut on that card aired live on Fox Sports Net/Deportes, Japan's WOWOW, and Mexico's TV Azteca. The realization of that card owes much to a trust relationship with Bob Arum, the support of WOWOW which celebrated the twentieth anniversary at that time, and the popularity of Márquez. Nishioka's defense in the United States was planned from around 2009. Although Japan's professional boxing has some negative background, that was an aggressive overseas expansion in order to get higher status as a world champion. Honda made Nishioka the first Japanese boxer who defended the world title in the United States. That victory broke the sense of stagnation of Japan's professional boxing and gave it a hope.

In addition to above mentioned Ōba, Nishioka and Linares, Honda has also promoted Jirō Watanabe (Osaka Teiken Boxing Gym), Tsuyoshi Hamada, Genaro Hernandez, Eloy Rojas, Edwin Valero, Jorge Linares, Román González et al. He currently manages Jorge Linares, Takahiro Aō, Akifumi Shimoda, Shinsuke Yamanaka, Toshiyuki Igarashi, Takashi Miura, Yoshihiro Kamegai, Ryōta Murata among others. His aim is to promote mega-fights in the United States, and bring up successful boxers who could be elected to the Hall of Fame.

== Bibliography ==
- Johnson, John; Long, Bill (February 2008). Tyson-Douglas: The Inside Story of the Upset of the Century. Herndon, Virginia: Potomac Books. pp. 9, 46. ISBN 9781597974806.
- McNeil, William F. (September 2014). The Rise of Mike Tyson, Heavyweight. Jefferson, North Carolina: McFarland & Company. pp. 219–220. ISBN 9781476618029.
- Masahiro Miyazaki; et al. (April 10, 2010). Boxing Magazine (in Japanese). No. April 2010 issue. Tokyo, Japan: Baseball Magazine Sha Co., Ltd. pp. 5, 10.
- Isao Hara (October 5, 2011). 西岡利晃が本場アメリカで認められた理由 (in Japanese). Sportiva (Shueisha). pp. 1–2. Archived from the original on October 7, 2011.
