= Yūichi Kasai =

Japanese boxer and trainer

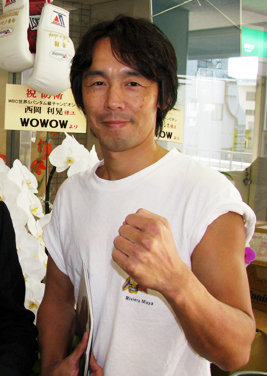
- Kasai at Teiken Boxing Gym in 2010

Personal information
- Nationality: Japanese
- Born: Yūichi Kasai; Japanese: 葛西 裕一; 17 November 1969 (age 56) Yokohama, Kanagawa, Japan
- Height: 5 ft 9 in (1.75 m)
- Weight: Junior Featherweight

Boxing career
- Stance: Orthodox

Boxing record
- Total fights: 29
- Wins: 24
- Win by KO: 16
- Losses: 4
- Draws: 1

Yūichi Kasai (葛西 裕一, Kasai Yūichi; born November 17, 1969) is a Japanese boxing trainer and a former three-time world title challenger in the junior featherweight division.

== Biography ==
Kasai was born in Yokohama, Kanagawa Prefecture, Japan, and trained in Judo as a child before he began boxing at the age of a high school student. He won the Japan's inter-high school championship in the bantamweight division in 1987.

=== Professional boxing career ===
Dropping out of the Senshu University in one year with an amateur record of 44–4 (24 KOs), Kasai made his professional debut as a boxer managed by the Teiken Boxing Gym at the Korakuen Hall on August 12, 1989.

After winning the sixth edition of the annual Japanese boxing series, the Class A Tournament in the junior featherweight division in November 1991, he experienced three away matches in the first half of 1992. With the promotion by the gym's president Akihiko Honda, he studied boxing in the United States. At first he trained in Los Angeles from February 1992, and won via a third-round knockout at the Great Western Forum in Inglewood, California. Then he learned under the instruction of Miguel Diaz at the Top Rank Gym while staying in Las Vegas, Nevada, and won two fights there at the Thomas & Mack Center and the Mirage. Back then two Japanese boxers fought only in one match in Las Vegas, but no Japanese stayed there and fought twice.

Kasai gained the Japanese junior featherweight title via a second-round knockout on September 5, 1992, and defended it twice. Miguel Diaz supported him as a chief second also in the fights in Japan. He was tied on points with the former Olympian Abraham Torres in April 1993, and won on points against Jerome Coffee in October of that year.

In March 1994 Kasai fought against the WBA world junior featherweight champion Wilfredo Vázquez as an undefeated challenger at the Tokyo Metropolitan Gymnasium where he was knocked out at two minutes five seconds of the first round. Making expeditions for the following fights, he won via a second-round knockout in Maracay, Venezuela in June, and won via a seventh round technical decision at the Neal S. Blaisdell Center in Honolulu in July of that year. Although he lost in a fight for the WBA Fedelatin junior featherweight title via a sixth-round technical knockout in Caracas, Venezuela in September of the same year, he captured the OPBF junior featherweight title in the next fight on February 4, 1995, and defended it once.

Then while staying in Las Vegas again, after winning two matches at the Caesars Palace and the MGM Grand Las Vegas, Kasai was defeated in the showdown for the WBA world junior featherweight title against Antonio Cermeño via a unanimous decision at the Aladdin on December 21, 1996. He lost successively his third title shot against Cermeño via a final round knockout while being watched by 15,000 spectators at the Yokohama Arena on July 26, 1997, and finally he retired as a boxer.

=== Post-retirement ===
Currently Kasai acts as a trainer of the Teiken Boxing Gym in Tokyo. He guided Toshiaki Nishioka whom he has coached for nearly ten years, to the world title in 2008, and was presented with the nineteenth Eddie Townsend Award that year. In 2011, Akifumi Shimoda trained by Kasai was crowned the world champion. Shimoda is the Teiken Boxing Gym's second boxer following Masao Ohba who became a world champion from a walk-in boxer with no experience. From 2012 through 2013, Toshiyuki Igarashi and Takashi Miura also secured the world titles under Kasai.

Kasai also serves as a commentator of the boxing broadcast on Nippon Television including Nittele G+.

== Bibliography ==
- Boxing Magazine editorial department, ed. (May 31, 2002). 日本プロボクシング史 世界タイトルマッチで見る50年 (Japan Pro Boxing History – 50 Years of World Title Bouts) (in Japanese). Tokyo, Japan: Baseball Magazine Sha Co., Ltd. pp. 177–179, 294. ISBN 978-4-583-03695-3.
- Minoru Sase (March 20, 1993). 葛西裕一の世界獲り. Keiba Saikyō no hōsoku (in Japanese) (special issue). Tokyo, Japan: KK Bestsellers Co., Ltd.: 3–4.
