= Sendai Tanaka =

Japanese boxing trainer

- Japanese: 田中 繊大
- Born: March 26, 1972 (age 53); Yamoto, Higashimatsushima, Miyagi, Japan
- Occupation: Boxing trainer
- Years active: 1995–present
- Known for: Training boxers such as Marco Antonio Barrera, Erik Morales, Lorenzo Parra, Edwin Valero, Jorge Linares, Román González, Takahiro Aō among others
- Notable work: Naseem Hamed vs. Marco Antonio Barrera,

Sendai Tanaka (田中 繊大, Tanaka Sendai; born March 26, 1972) is a Japanese boxing trainer. He is one of the few outstanding trainers from Asia, and has a reputation especially for his focus mitts training.

== Early career ==
Tanaka was born in Yamoto, Miyagi (current Yamoto, Higashimatsushima, Miyagi), Japan. At age fourteen when he was in the third grade of high school in 1986, he learned boxing from a former boxer from Chuo University who lived near his family home. He joined Sendai Gym (current Shin-Nihon Sendai Boxing Gym) in the first year of Miyagi Prefectural Fisheries High School. Having finished his five-year amateur career with a record of 18–5, Tanaka won his professional debut in April 1991, and compiled a 2–3–1 record in the featherweight and lightweight divisions by February 1994.

Tanaka had adored Sadahiro Gonohe, the president of Hachinohe Teiken Boxing Gym, who is known as a theorist. After his retirement as a boxer, Tanaka started training with Gonohe at his gym to become a boxing trainer. Gonohe taught him how to train with focus mitts there. The gym had a Mexican trainer, and Latinos visited there. At first he had been studying Spanish on his own. Then, a Mexican Spanish teacher, an acquaintance at the gym, came to give him lessons for free. Tanaka also actively participated in the Spanish-speaking people's parties and masses, where he got acquainted with an Argentine family. He lived together with them like a homestay for over a year.

== Mexico, United States and Argentina ==
By February 1995, Tanaka had mastered Spanish language. He went to Mexico for practice with about 7,100 dollars (in the amount of time) earned by part-time job. He began working in Mexico, but his final destination was Argentina. Tanaka loves Argentina, and boxing in that country. Whenever Tanaka has time to spare, he headed from Mexico to Argentina.

When Tanaka was twenty-two years old, then twenty-one-year-old Marco Antonio Barrera came to the gym where he was training, and asked for his focus mitts workout. Barrera was to fight for the world title for the first time in March 1995. After training for the day, Tanaka agreed to become his co-trainer with Rudy Pérez (1955–2013) in response to his request. Barrera won that first world title shot. Successively, Tanaka guided him to a victory in the fight against Naseem Hamed in April 2001. During Barrera's rest period, Tanaka observed the teaching methods of a variety of trainers. He learned at gatherings and conferences in Mexico, the United States and Argentina. He also received their guidance to learn the techniques, and coached boxers there.

When he started living in Mexico, he heard boxers trained by the International Boxing Hall of Famer Argentine Amílcar Brusa (1922–2011) saying that they could have lived a happy boxer life since Brusa was in their corners. When Brusa had coached the Golden Boy-promoted boxers in Los Angeles and Big Bear City, California, Tanaka studied under him. Tanaka recognized Brusa as the best master and called him Maestro. He received his guidance every time he met Brusa.

== Japan ==
In December 2002, Akihiko Honda who has been looking for excellent trainers who can bring out the boxers' ability all over the world, requested him to become a trainer of his Teiken Boxing Gym. Tanaka started to coach in Japan at times other than Barrera's training, and signed a deal with Teiken Boxing Gym in May 2003. While instructing Jorge Linares intensively, he made some other boxers spar with Barrera, or made them participate in his training camps. In Linares' first world title shot in Las Vegas, Nevada in July 2007, Tanaka served as the chief second among Rudy Pérez, Rudy Hernández and Kenny Adams. Just before the gong sounded, Tanaka tapped on his back saying that "Thanks for making me a second of the world champion. Let's go". Tanaka later told that he changed the plan during the fight and Linares neatly ran it since he was a superior boxer.

Tanaka has so far trained the world champions such as Erik Morales, Lorenzo Parra, Edwin Valero, Jorge Linares, Román González, Takahiro Aō et al. In March 2011, Tanaka's hometown Higashimatsushima was devastated by the Tōhoku earthquake. His two-story family home's first floor was submerged by the tsunami. Although his family was safe, his nearby relatives were swallowed by the tsunami. However, since Aō's first defense was scheduled in early April, Tanaka remained in Tokyo saying nothing about it, and continued training. Tanaka had been chosen for the twenty-second Eddie Townsend Award in 2011, but declined it for personal reasons.

Every morning, he has been running and training his abdominal muscles. While he worked as an employee of Teiken Boxing Gym, he also hoped to train boxers in various countries and improve his skill as a boxing trainer. Tanaka visited Brusa in Santa Fe, Argentina in January 2010. He daily went to the boxing gym with Brusa to coach boxers there. After they finished all boxers' workout, Brusa make Tanaka wear gloves to train him. Then, they went to the sports gym run by Brusa's daughter, and talked about the history of boxing or Brusa's own in his room within that gym. He has continued to be a trainer in order to become a trainer similar to Amílcar Brusa.

Tanaka wanted to receive the long-term guidance from Brusa, but could not have that time. When he heard that Rudy Pérez had suffered from a severe disease, he canceled the contract with Teiken Boxing Gym and left Japan for Mexico. He wanted to come back in the original intention not to be puffed up in the comfortable situation.

== Bibliography ==
- Minoru Suenaga (February 5, 2008). "おじさんは知らないイケてる Business Person – 田中繊大". Nikkei Business Associé (in Japanese) (of February 5, 2008). Tokyo, Japan: Nikkei Business Publications: 104–107.
- Sendai Tanaka (April 10, 2010). アルゼンチン・ボクシング紀行. Boxing Magazine (in Japanese). No. April 2010 issue. Tokyo, Japan: Baseball Magazine Sha Co., Ltd. pp. 76–77.
- Masahiro Miyazaki (September 10, 2007). 田中繊大「最後の一押し」それがセコンドであり、トレーナーの仕事. Boxing Magazine (in Japanese). No. October 2007 issue. Tokyo, Japan: Baseball Magazine Sha Co., Ltd. pp. 56–57.
