= Alejandro Pérez =

Alejandro Pérez may refer to:

- Alejandro Pérez (footballer, born 1975) (Alejandro Pérez Macías), Mexican football manager and former defender
- Álex Pérez (footballer, born 1985) (Alejandro Pérez Aracil), Spanish footballer
- Álex Pérez (footballer, born 1991) (Alejandro Pérez Navarro), Spanish footballer
- Alejandro Pérez (fighter) (born 1989), Mexican mixed martial artist
- Alejandro Pérez (boxer) (born 2000), Mexican American boxer and singer
- Alejandro Perez, a character played by Tony Plana in Desperate Housewives
