= Rico Ramos =

American boxer

Personal information
- Nickname: Suavecito
- Nationality: American
- Born: Rico Dashon Ramos; June 20, 1987 (age 39) Los Angeles, California, U.S.
- Height: 5 ft 5 in (165 cm)
- Weight: Super bantamweight; Featherweight

Boxing career
- Reach: 67 in (170 cm)
- Stance: Orthodox

Boxing record
- Total fights: 36
- Wins: 30
- Win by KO: 14
- Losses: 6

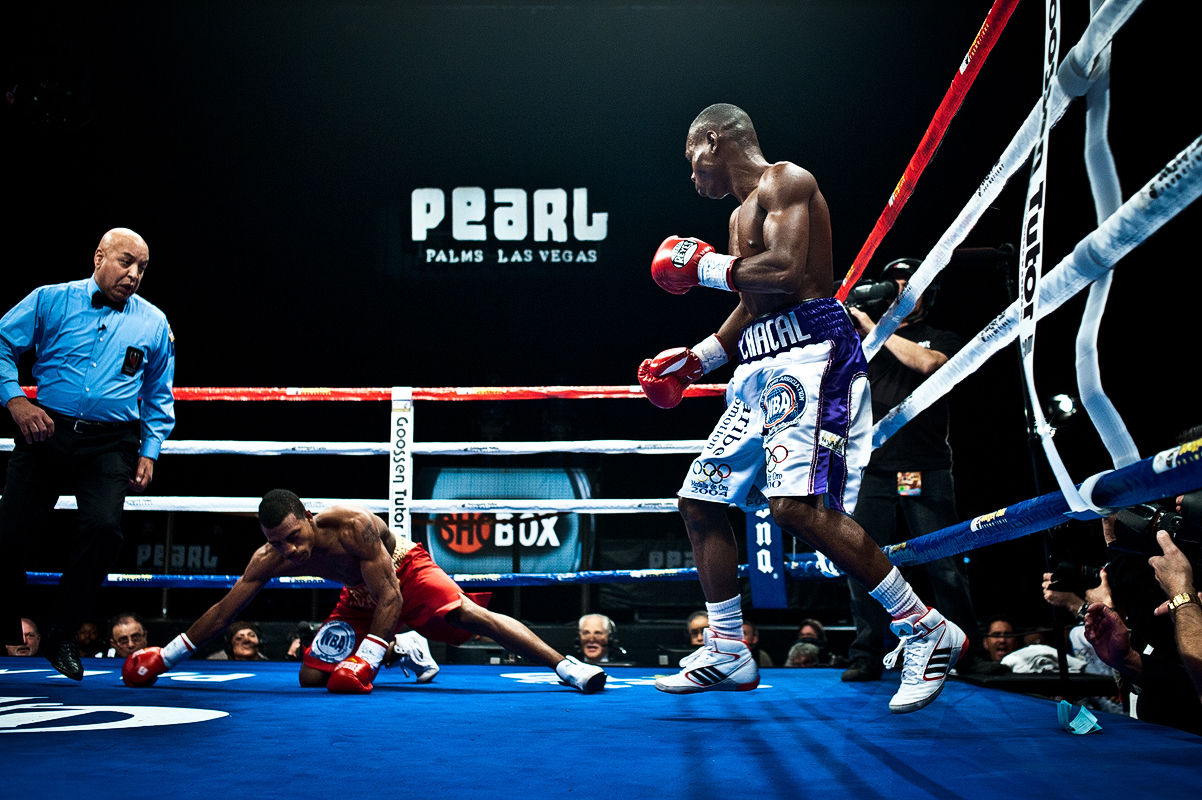

Rico Dashon Ramos (born June 20, 1987) is an American professional boxer of Puerto Rican descent. He is a former WBA world super bantamweight champion.

== Amateur career ==
Ramos began boxing when he was 8 years old at South LA's Broadway Boxing Gym. During his amateur career he was an Olympic alternate and won the 2007 National PAL championship. In November 2008, Ramos asked Darnell Walker to train him after he suffered a severe hand injury. While Ramos was under Walker's instruction, he went undefeated, capturing the WBO/NABO Title by defeating Alejandro Pérez.

In 2007 he also was the runner up at the U.S. National Championships, losing to U.S. Olympian Raynell Williams.

== Professional career ==
Currently Ramos is promoted by Goossen Tutor Promotions and managed by Al Haymon.

On March 5, 2010 Rico got a 4th round K.O. over veteran Cecilio Santos, on ESPN's Friday Night Fights.

On November 8, 2010 Rico got a 2nd round K.O. over Heriberto Ruiz in North Carolina. Rico then claimed his 19th win in a tough fight against Alejandro Valdez by unanimous decision in Atlantic City, taking his next step towards his dream of becoming world champion.

=== WBA Super Bantamweight Championship ===
He fought for Akifumi Shimoda's WBA super bantamweight title at the Boardwalk Hall in Atlantic City, New Jersey, United States on July 9, 2011. He defeated Akifumi Shimoda by KO in the 7th round to win the WBA title.

== Professional boxing record ==
36 fights	30 wins	6 losses
By knockout	14	2
By decision	16	4

No.	Result	Record	Opponent	Type	Round, time	Date	Location	Notes
36	Loss	30–6	Jessie Magdaleno	UD	10	23 Mar 2019	The Hangar, Costa Mesa, California, U.S.	For vacant WBC USNBC featherweight title
35	Win	30–5	Daniel Olea	UD	8	28 Sep 2018	Oracle Arena, Oakland, California, U.S.	
34	Win	29–5	Christian Esquivel	RTD	5 (8), 3:00	28 Apr 2018	Celebrity Theatre, Phoenix, Arizona, U.S.	
33	Win	28–5	Juan Antonio Lopez	UD	10	15 Jul 2017	Wild Horse Pass Hotel & Casino, Chandler, Arizona, U.S.	Won vacant NABA super bantamweight title
32	Win	27–5	Erik Ruiz	UD	10	11 Mar 2017	Downtown Las Vegas Event Center, Las Vegas, Nevada, U.S.	
31	Win	26–5	Prosper Ankrah	KO	3 (8), 2:29	24 Sep 2016	Los Angeles Badminton Club, El Monte, California, U.S.	
30	Win	25–5	Justin Savi	UD	8	11 Jun 2016	Los Angeles Badminton Club, El Monte, California, U.S.	
29	Loss	24–5	Claudio Marrero	KO	3 (10), 0:20	25 Jul 2015	Pearl Theater, Las Vegas, Nevada, U.S.	
28	Win	24–4	Juan Ruiz	UD	8	11 Dec 2014	Pechanga Resort & Casino, Temecula, California, U.S.	
27	Loss	23–4	Jesús Cuellar	UD	12	2 May 2014	The Joint, Las Vegas, Nevada, U.S.	For WBA interim featherweight title
26	Win	23–3	Jonathan Arrellano	UD	10	24 Jan 2014	Little Creek Casino Resort, Shelton, Washington, U.S.	
25	Win	22–3	Carlos Velásquez	KO	10 (10), 1:36	7 Sep 2013	Fantasy Springs Resort Casino, Indio, California, U.S.	
24	Loss	21–3	Óscar González	UD	10	12 Apr 2013	Little Creek Casino Resort, Shelton, Washington, U.S.	
23	Loss	21–2	Ronny Rios	UD	10	11 Jan 2013	Fantasy Springs Resort Casino, Indio, California, U.S.	Won vacant NABF featherweight title
22	Win	21–1	Efrain Esquivias Jr.	MD	8	23 Jun 2012	Sportsmans Lodge, Studio City, California, U.S.	
21	Loss	20–1	Guillermo Rigondeaux	KO	6 (12), 1:29	20 Jan 2012	Pearl Theater, Las Vegas, Nevada, U.S.	Lost WBA super bantamweight title
20	Win	20–0	Akifumi Shimoda	KO	7 (12), 2:46	9 Jul 2011	Boardwalk Hall, Atlantic City, New Jersey, U.S.	Won WBA super bantamweight title
19	Win	19–0	Alejandro Valdez	UD	10	11 Feb 2011	Bally's, Atlantic City, New Jersey, U.S.	
18	Win	18–0	Heriberto Ruiz	KO	2 (10), 1:03	8 Nov 2010	Corrosion Hangar, Camp Lejuene, North Carolina, U.S.	
17	Win	17–0	Cuauhtemoc Vargas	UD	8	23 Jul 2010	Tachi Palace, Lemoore, California, U.S.	Retained WBO Youth super bantamweight title
16	Win	16–0	Reynaldo Lopez	UD	8	24 Apr 2010	Citizens Business Bank Arena, Ontario, California, U.S.	
15	Win	15–0	Cecilio Santos	KO	4 (8), 1:19	5 Mar 2010	Pechanga Resort & Casino, Temecula, California, U.S.	Retained WBO Youth super bantamweight title
14	Win	14–0	Alejandro Pérez	UD	8	28 Nov 2009	Pechanga Resort & Casino, Temecula, California, U.S.	Won vacant WBO Youth super bantamweight title
13	Win	13–0	Kermin Guardia	UD	6	26 Sep 2009	Staples Center, Los Angeles, California, U.S.	
12	Win	12–0	Victor Martinez	KO	3 (8), 1:46	12 Sep 2009	Pechanga Resort & Casino, Temecula, California, U.S.	
11	Win	11–0	Juan Jose Beltran	RTD	4 (6), 3:00	16 Jul 2009	Tachi Palace, Lemoore, California, U.S.	
10	Win	10–0	Trinidad Mendoza	TKO	3 (6), 1:57	16 May 2009	Oracle Arena, Oakland, California, U.S.	
9	Win	9–0	Gino Escamilla	UD	6	11 Apr 2009	Mandalay Bay Events Center, Las Vegas, Nevada, U.S.	
8	Win	8–0	Torrence Daniels	UD	6	23 Oct 2008	Tachi Palace, Lemoore, California, U.S.	
7	Win	7–0	Manuel Sarabia	TKO	1 (6), 1:31	25 Sep 2008	Soboba Casino, San Jacinto, California, U.S.	
6	Win	6–0	Alvaro Muro	TKO	3 (6), 1:42	11 Sep 2008	SAP Center, San Jose, California U.S.	
5	Win	5–0	Jonathan Velardez	UD	4	16 Jul 2008	Pechanga Resort & Casino, Temecula, California, U.S.	
4	Win	4–0	Harvey Phillips	RTD	1 (4), 3:00	26 Jun 2008	Tachi Palace, Lemoore, California, U.S.	
3	Win	3–0	Jerry Mondragon	TKO	2 (4), 2:43	5 Jun 2008	SAP Center, San Jose, California, U.S.	
2	Win	2–0	Denis Moreno	TKO	2 (4), 1:29	17 May 2008	Star of the Desert Arena, Primm, Nevada, U.S.	
1	Win	1–0	Samuel Jude Yniguez	UD	4	20 Mar 2008	SAP Center, San Jose California, U.S.	

== See also ==
- List of super-bantamweight boxing champions

Achievements
Preceded by Akifumi Shimoda	WBA super-bantamweight champion July 9, 2011 – January 20, 2012	Succeeded by Guillermo Rigondeaux
