= Óscar Larios =

Mexican boxer

Personal information
- Nickname: Chololo
- Born: Óscar Larios; 1 November 1976 (age 50) Zapopan, Mexico
- Height: 5 ft 7 in (170 cm)
- Weight: Super bantamweight; Featherweight

Boxing career
- Reach: 69 1/2 in (177 cm)
- Stance: Orthodox

Boxing record
- Total fights: 71
- Wins: 63
- Win by KO: 39
- Losses: 7
- Draws: 1

Óscar Larios (born 1 November 1976) is a Mexican former professional boxer who competed from 1994 to 2009. He is a world champion in two weight classes, having held the WBC super bantamweight title from 2002 to 2004 and the WBC featherweight title from 2008 to 2009.

== Professional career ==
Promoted by Oscar De La Hoya, Larios began his career at 17 and dropped early losses to Israel Vázquez by KO in the 1st round and Agapito Sánchez by TKO in the 5th prior to hitting his stride as he accumulated a record of 39-2 before his first world title.

=== WBC Super Bantamweight Championship ===
In 2001, Larios challenged undefeated WBC Super Bantamweight title holder Willie Jorrín and lost a disputed 12-round decision. Due to Jorrin's lack of activity, Larios fought Vázquez for the interim WBC Super Bantamweight Title and his earlier loss to Vázquez by scoring a TKO in the 12th round. Several months later, Larios again took on Jorrin and avenged the earlier defeat by defeating Jorrin by TKO in the 1st round.

Larios went on to defend his title 7 times (along with 3 non-title fights), including a victory over Nedal Hussein and two wins over fan favorite Wayne McCullough. He then took on Vázquez yet again but was dominated this time, dropping the trilogy capper by KO 3 and thus losing his title. In July 2006, Larios moved up to Super Featherweight to take on then three-division world champion Manny Pacquiao, a Filipino boxer highly capable of besting opponents by KO. Larios fought bravely, but was dominated by the much smaller Pacquiao and was dropped twice en route to losing a 12-round decision.

=== Move to Featherweight ===
==== Interim WBC Featherweight Championship ====
On July 21, 2007, Jorge Linares of Venezuela defeated him by KO in the 10th round for the WBC Interim featherweight title in Las Vegas, Nevada, Nevada. After the fight with Linares, Larios was diagnosed with a minor subdural hematoma, bleeding of the brain, putting any hopes of a future boxing career in jeopardy. Larios eventually returned to boxing, but remains under medical suspension throughout the United States.

Later on February 22, 2008, Larios won his latest match by unanimous decision against Arturo Gomez.

In May 2008, Larios defeated Feider Viloria via fifth-round TKO for the vacant Interim WBC Featherweight title, commissioned when reigning titlist Jorge Linares was unavailable to fight Viloria due to injury. On August 2, 2008, in Zapopan, Jalisco, Larios made his first defense of the WBC interim featherweight title, defeating Marlon Aguilar by seventh-round knockout. The bout was competitive for several rounds, but Larious took command of the fight, knocking Aguilar down at the end of the sixth round and knocking him out in the seventh round.

=== WBC Featherweight Championship ===
Larios inherited the full-pledge WBC featherweight title when Linares relinquished it to move up in weight.

He won his first defense of his title with a split decision win over Takahiro Ao on October 16, 2008. Despite being floored in the 4th round, Larios managed to outbox the Japanese challenger for the victory.

The two fighters met again on March 12, 2009. Like in the previous encounter, the matches resulted in a decision. But this time, it was in Aoh's favor.

== Professional boxing record ==
71 fights	63 wins	7 losses
By knockout	39	4
By decision	24	3
Draws	1	

No.	Result	Record	Opponent	Type	Round, time	Date	Location	Notes
71	Loss	63–7–1	Takahiro Ao	UD	12	12 Mar 2009	Korakuen Hall, Tokyo, Japan	Lost WBC featherweight title
70	Win	63–6–1	Takahiro Ao	SD	12	16 Oct 2008	Yoyogi First Gym, Tokyo, Japan	Retained WBC featherweight title
69	Win	62–6–1	Marlon Aguilar	KO	7 (12), 2:30	2 Aug 2008	Auditorio Benito Juárez, Zapopan, Jalisco, Mexico	Retained WBC interim featherweight title
68	Win	61–6–1	Feider Viloria	TKO	5 (12), 0:24	31 May 2008	Centro Internacional de Convenciones, Chetumal, Quintana Roo, Mexico	Won vacant WBC interim featherweight title
67	Win	60–6–1	Arturo Gomez	UD	12	22 Feb 2008	Salon Marbet Plus, Ciudad Nezahualcoyotl, Mexico	Won vacant WBC Latino super featherweight title
66	Loss	59–6–1	Jorge Linares	TKO	10 (12), 2:37	21 Jul 2007	Mandalay Bay Resort & Casino, Las Vegas, Nevada, U.S.	For vacant WBC interim featherweight title
65	Win	59–5–1	Luis Cid Pacheco	UD	10	31 Mar 2007	Centro de Cancun, Cancun, Quintina Roo, Mexico	
64	Win	58–5–1	Ramon Mendez	UD	10	14 Dec 2006	Salón de Eventos Los Fresnos, Tepic, Nayarit, Mexico	
63	Win	57–5–1	Roberto Bonilla	TKO	4 (10), 1:40	6 Oct 2006	Desert Diamond Casino, Tucson, Arizona, U.S.	
62	Loss	56–5–1	Manny Pacquiao	UD	12	2 Jul 2006	Araneta Coliseum, Cubao, Quezon City, Metro Manila, Philippines	For WBC International super featherweight title
61	Loss	56–4–1	Israel Vázquez	TKO	3 (12), 2:52	3 Dec 2005	Mandalay Bay Resort & Casino, Las Vegas, Nevada, U.S.	Lost WBC super bantamweight title
60	Win	56–3–1	Wayne McCullough	RTD	10 (12), 3:00	16 Jul 2005	MGM Grand, Las Vegas, Nevada, U.S.	Retained WBC super bantamweight title
59	Win	55–3–1	Wayne McCullough	UD	12	10 Feb 2005	Palace Indian Gaming Center, Lemoore, California, U.S.	Retained WBC super bantamweight title
58	Win	54–3–1	Nedal Hussein	UD	12	17 Nov 2004	MGM Grand, Las Vegas, Nevada, U.S.	Retained WBC super bantamweight title
57	Win	53–3–1	Ivan Alvarez	UD	10	20 Aug 2004	Isleta Casino & Resort, Albuquerque, New Mexico, U.S.	
56	Win	52–3–1	Jesus Salvador Perez	UD	10	11 Jun 2004	Sundance Square, Fort Worth, Texas, U.S.	
55	Win	51–3–1	Shigeru Nakazato	UD	12	6 Mar 2004	Super Arena, Saitama, Tokyo, Japan	Retained WBC super bantamweight title
54	Win	50–3–1	Napapol Sor Rungvisai	TKO	10 (12), 2:26	22 Nov 2003	Olympic Auditorium, Los Angeles, California, U.S.	Retained WBC super bantamweight title
53	Win	49–3–1	Kozo Ishii	TKO	2 (12), 2:02	7 Sep 2003	Rainbow Hall, Nagoya, Aichi, Japan	Retained WBC super bantamweight title
52	Win	48–3–1	Shigeru Nakazato	UD	12	26 Apr 2003	Kokugikan, Tokyo, Japan	Retained WBC super bantamweight title
51	Win	47–3–1	Marcos Licona	UD	10	16 Jan 2003	Olympic Auditorium, Los Angeles, California, U.S.	
50	Win	46–3–1	Willie Jorrín	TKO	1 (12), 1:28	1 Nov 2002	Arco Arena, Sacramento, California, U.S.	Won WBC super bantamweight title
49	Win	45–3–1	Manabu Fukushima	TKO	8 (12), 2:27	24 Aug 2002	Kokugikan, Tokyo, Japan	Retained WBC interim super bantamweight title
48	Win	44–3–1	Israel Vázquez	TKO	12 (12), 1:57	17 May 2002	Memorial Auditorium, Sacramento, California, U.S.	Won vacant WBC interim super bantamweight title
47	Win	43–3–1	Darryl Pinckney	UD	8	8 Mar 2002	Civic Center, Kissimmee, Florida, U.S.	
46	Win	42–3–1	Ivan Alvarez	UD	12	7 Dec 2001	Miccosukee Indian Gaming Resort, Miami, Florida, U.S.	Retained WBC FECARBOX super bantamweight title
45	Win	41–3–1	Ángel Chacón	UD	12	19 Oct 2001	Civic Center, Kissimmee, Florida, U.S.	Won WBA Fedecentro and WBC FECARBOX super bantamweight titles
44	Win	40–3–1	John Lowey	UD	10	17 Mar 2001	Convention Center, Albuquerque, New Mexico, U.S.	
43	Loss	39–3–1	Willie Jorrín	UD	12	19 Jan 2001	Arco Arena, Sacramento, California, U.S.	For WBC super bantamweight title
42	Win	39–2–1	Sammy Ventura	KO	1 (12)	16 Sep 2000	Mexico City, Distrito Federal, Mexico	Retained Mexico super bantamweight title
41	Win	38–2–1	César Soto	UD	12	24 Jun 2000	Peppermill Hotel & Casino, Reno, Nevada, U.S.	
40	Win	37–2–1	Saul Briseno	TKO	10 (12)	17 Dec 1999	Arena Coliseo, Guadalajara, Jalisco, Mexico	Retained Mexico super bantamweight title
39	Win	36–2–1	Jorge Munoz Jr.	TKO	12 (12)	15 Oct 1999	Plaza de Toros Calafia, Mexicali, Baja California, Mexico	Retained Mexico super bantamweight title
38	Win	35–2–1	Sammy Ventura	KO	2 (12)	3 Sep 1999	Arena Coliseo, Guadalajara, Jalisco, Mexico	Retained Mexico super bantamweight title
37	Win	34–2–1	Agustin Lorenzo	TKO	6 (12)	25 Jun 1999	Guadalajara, Jalisco, Mexico	Retained Mexico super bantamweight title
36	Win	33–2–1	Saul Briseno	UD	12	15 May 1999	Arena Coliseo, Mexico City, Distrito Federal, Mexico	Retained Mexico super bantamweight title
35	Win	32–2–1	Miguel Angel Escamilla	TKO	10 (12), 3:00	9 Apr 1999	Pechanga Entertainment Center, Temecula, California, U.S.	Retained Mexico super bantamweight title
34	Win	31–2–1	Alberto Martinez	KO	4 (12)	12 Feb 1999	Guadalajara, Jalisco, Mexico	Retained Mexico super bantamweight title
33	Win	30–2–1	Javier Calderon	TKO	2 (12)	21 Nov 1998	Reynosa, Tamaulipas, Mexico	Won Mexico super bantamweight title
32	Loss	29–2–1	Agapito Sánchez	TKO	5 (12)	23 Oct 1998	Hotel Costa Club, Acapulco, Guerrero, Mexico	For WBO Inter–Continental super bantamweight title
31	Win	29–1–1	Pedro Ramirez	TKO	2	9 Oct 1998	Guadalajara, Jalisco, Mexico	
30	Win	28–1–1	Gregorio Medina	TKO	2 (12)	11 Sep 1998	Guadalajara, Jalisco, Mexico	
29	Win	27–1–1	Antonio Ramirez	PTS	8	15 Aug 1998	Olympic Auditorium, Los Angeles, California, U.S.	
28	Win	26–1–1	Pedro Ayala	KO	2	31 Jul 1998	Guadalajara, Jalisco, Mexico	
27	Win	25–1–1	Javier Lucas	TKO	7	6 Jun 1998	Mexico City, Distrito Federal, Mexico	
26	Win	24–1–1	Ulises Flores	TKO	7	21 Mar 1998	Mexico City, Distrito Federal, Mexico	
25	Win	23–1–1	Miguel Ochoa	KO	2	5 Dec 1997	Guadalajara, Jalisco, Mexico	
24	Win	22–1–1	Jose Francisco Sarabia	SD	10	18 Sep 1997	Arena Mexico, Mexico City, Distrito Federal, Mexico	
23	Draw	21–1–1	Carlos Madrid	TD	1	1 Aug 1997	Guadalajara, Jalisco, Mexico	
22	Win	21–1	Israel Melendez	TKO	2 (12)	4 Jul 1997	Guadalajara, Jalisco, Mexico	Won Sinaloa State super bantamweight title
21	Loss	20–1	Israel Vázquez	KO	1 (10)	12 Apr 1997	Arena Coliseo, Mexico City, Distrito Federal, Mexico	
20	Win	20–0	Valente Flores	KO	2	31 Jan 1997	Ocotlan, Jalisco, Mexico	
19	Win	19–0	Carlos Madrid	KO	4	29 Dec 1996	Guadalajara, Jalisco, Mexico	
18	Win	18–0	Jose Rodriguez	TKO	2 (12)	22 Nov 1996	Guadalajara, Jalisco, Mexico	
17	Win	17–0	Israel Melendez	PTS	10	6 Sep 1996	Guadalajara, Jalisco, Mexico	
16	Win	16–0	Arturo Gonzalez	TKO	2	5 Jul 1996	Guadalajara, Jalisco, Mexico	
15	Win	15–0	Marco Mora	KO	2	24 May 1996	Guadalajara, Jalisco, Mexico	
14	Win	14–0	Alvaro Garcia	KO	1 (8)	9 May 1996	Guadalajara, Jalisco, Mexico	
13	Win	13–0	Oscar Galindo	PTS	8	29 Mar 1996	Guadalajara, Jalisco, Mexico	
12	Win	12–0	Eustolio Albino	KO	2	1 Mar 1996	Arena Coliseo, Guadalajara, Jalisco, Mexico	
11	Win	11–0	Roberto Vera Ibarra	PTS	4	10 Nov 1995	Guadalajara, Jalisco, Mexico	
10	Win	10–0	Manuel Ramirez	KO	3	23 Sep 1995	Convention Center, Sacramento, California, U.S.	
9	Win	9–0	Cecilio Marino Jimenez	PTS	4	26 Aug 1995	Mexico City, Distrito Federal, Mexico	
8	Win	8–0	Jose Aldas	KO	5	30 Jun 1995	Guadalajara, Jalisco, Mexico	
7	Win	7–0	Gabino Reyes	TKO	4	17 Mar 1995	Guadalajara, Jalisco, Mexico	
6	Win	6–0	Fernando Ramirez	KO	2	18 Feb 1995	Guadalajara, Jalisco, Mexico	
5	Win	5–0	Juan Macias	TKO	2	6 Feb 1995	Guadalajara, Jalisco, Mexico	
4	Win	4–0	Ismael Garcia	KO	3 (6)	18 Jun 1994	Zapopan, Jalisco, Mexico	
3	Win	3–0	Fernando Vega	PTS	4	23 Apr 1994	Zapopan, Jalisco, Mexico	
2	Win	2–0	Pedro Lopez	KO	3	18 Feb 1994	Zapopan, Jalisco, Mexico	
1	Win	1–0	David Garcia	KO	1	15 Jan 1994	Guadalajara, Jalisco, Mexico	

== Titles in boxing ==
=== Major world titles ===
- WBC super-bantamweight champion (122 lbs)
- WBC featherweight champion (126 lbs)

=== Major interim world titles ===
- WBC interim super bantamweight champion (122 lbs)
- WBC interim featherweight champion (126 lbs)

=== Regional/International titles ===
- Mexico super bantamweight champion (122 lbs)
- WBA Fedecentro super bantamweight champion (122 lbs)
- WBC FECARBOX super bantamweight champion (122 lbs)
- WBC Latino super featherweight champion (130 lbs)

== Pay-per-view bouts ==
United States
Date	Fight	Billing	Buys	Network	Revenue
2 July 2006	Pacquiao vs. Larios	Mano-A-Mano	120,000	Top Rank	$4,794,000

== See also ==
- List of super-bantamweight boxing champions
- List of featherweight boxing champions
- List of Mexican boxing world champions

Sporting positions
World boxing titles
New title	WBC super bantamweight champion Interim title 17 May 2002 – 1 November 2002; Won full title	Vacant Title next held by Toshiaki Nishioka
Preceded by Willie Jorrín	WBC super bantamweight champion 1 November 2002 – 3 December 2005	Succeeded by Israel Vázquez
Vacant Title last held by Humberto Soto	WBC featherweight champion Interim title 31 May 2008 – 13 August 2008; Promoted	Vacant Title next held by Óscar Escandón
Preceded by Jorge Linares; Vacated	WBC featherweight champion 13 August 2008 – 12 March 2009	Succeeded by Takahiro Ao
