= Toshiaki Nishioka =

Japanese boxer

Toshiaki Nishioka 西岡 利晃
Personal information
- Nicknames: Speed King; Monster Left
- Born: July 25, 1976 (age 50) Kakogawa, Hyōgo, Japan
- Height: 5 ft 6 1/2 in (169 cm)
- Weight: Bantamweight; Super-bantamweight

Boxing career
- Reach: 68 1/2 in (174 cm)
- Stance: Southpaw

Boxing record
- Total fights: 47
- Wins: 39
- Win by KO: 24
- Losses: 5
- Draws: 3

Toshiaki Nishioka (西岡 利晃, Nishioka Toshiaki; born July 25, 1976) is a Japanese former professional boxer who competed from 1994 to 2012. He held the WBC super-bantamweight title from 2008 to 2012, and challenged for the WBO and The Ring super-bantamweight titles in his final-fight. Nishioka is known for his series of fights against Veeraphol Nakonluang-Promotion, with two of their four encounters ending in draws. Unlike many of Japan's other world champions, Nishioka willingly fought outside of his own country.

== Early life and career ==
Nishioka was born in Kakogawa, Hyōgo, Japan, in July 1976, and has one younger sister. He started boxing at age ten when he was in the fifth grade of elementary school on the recommendation of his father who runs a tavern. He compiled an amateur record of 10–2. Since before his professional debut, Nishioka had served as a sparring partner of the reigning WBC bantamweight champion Yasuei Yakushiji.

Nicknamed "Speed King", Nishioka won his professional debut by a first-round knockout in Himeji, Hyōgo, on December 11, 1994. But he was knocked out in the fourth round of the next fight at the Korakuen Hall, and was carried out on a stretcher. Nishioka won the annual Japanese boxing series, West Japan Rookie King Tournament in the super bantamweight division at the Osaka Prefectural Gymnasium in September 1995. Winning over the Central Japan rookie king in the next fight at the Nagoya Civic Assembly Hall, he fought against the rookie king of the Western part of Japan in Fukuoka in December of the same year. Though Nishioka was convinced of his victory, the judges were in favor of his opponent.

During his early career, Nishioka was expected to be Joichiro Tatsuyoshi's successor, and served as his sparring partner for two years since 1996. Nishioka went down a weight division to capture the Japanese bantamweight title at the Osaka Municipal Central Gymnasium on December 29, 1998, the last day when Tatsuyoshi was a world champion. Although Nishioka was knocked down once when away from the clinch in the first round, he twice floored his opponent while wearing a confident and defiant smile in the second round to be crowned, and defended the title twice before returning it.

=== Rivalry with Sahaprom, injuries ===
In June 2000, Nishioka challenged the WBC bantamweight champion Veeraphol Nakonluang-Promotion in Takasago, Hyōgo, and lost via a unanimous decision. He had belonged to the JM Kakogawa Gym until that fight, and has been managed by the Teiken Boxing Gym in Tokyo under Akihiko Honda's supervision and Yūichi Kasai's guidance since September 2000.

The second world title shot was watched by 12,000 spectators at the Yokohama Arena in September 2001, and was a very close fight in which the scores were 115–113 for Nishioka, 116–113 for Veeraphol, and 114–114 even. Nishioka suffered an Achilles tendon rupture twice during that year. In December 2002, he returned to the ring for the first time in fifteen months to gain a first-round knockout victory at the Mandalay Bay Resort and Casino in Las Vegas, Nevada. However his style was totally different from the previous one. He challenged Veeraphol for the third time at the Ryōgoku Kokugikan in October 2003, but the result was a draw by a hometown decision. In his fourth world title shot against Veeraphol in March 2004, he lost via a unanimous decision by a wide margin of points at the Saitama Super Arena.

After that defeat in 2004, Nishioka received a greeting card, with the Japanese message Kono michi yori ikiru michi nashi (この道より生きる道なし) written by painter Atsumu Yamamoto; the phrase can be interpreted as: "No way to live other than this way", which encouraged him. While Honda advised him to retire, and set subsequent matches to convince him, Nishioka, who had remained aloof and proud as a boxer and had not trained with gym mates, decided to run with younger fellow boxers to strengthen his mind. He also attended Marco Antonio Barrera's training camp on the West Coast of the United States.

=== Marriage and recovery ===
Nishioka got married in January 2005, and they have a daughter born in 2006. Nishioka went back to the super bantamweight division, and continued fighting mainly in Japan, besides a second-round technical knockout victory at the Palais des Sports in Marseille, France, in April 2005, and a fourth-round knockout victory (with a left-hand punch to the body) at The Joint in Las Vegas, Nevada, in November 2006. Nishioka noticed that the former motion before the Achilles tendon injury came back in the pivot of his ankle from around the fight in November 2006. His trainer Kasai also felt that Nishioka's foot recovered to its original condition, and his thinking and fighting style progressed significantly from around the fight in December 2007 or in April 2008.

After the fight in December 2007, Nishioka stayed at his wife's parents' home in Amagasaki, Hyōgo. With the consent of his wife and her father, he decided to live separate from his wife and daughter to focus on boxing alone. When he returned to Tokyo and told Honda about it, he was told that the possibility that his fifth world title was determined to be less than ten percent and that he should bring her back immediately. The discomfort in his foot completely disappeared in the beginning of 2008. From that year, he is registered as a resident in Amagasaki where his own house has been completed in 2012. Usually, Nishioka trains while living a solo life in Tokyo, and his wife and daughter live in Amagasaki. After each of Nishioka's fights, he spends time together with his family in Amagasaki. Nishioka later recalled that transfer to the Teiken Boxing Gym and marriage have been his major turning points.

=== WBC super bantamweight champion ===
Nishioka captured the WBC super bantamweight interim title against Thai's Napapol Kiatisakchokchai at the Pacifico Yokohama on September 15, 2008. Just after the fight, Veeraphol whom he fought four times, and who served as Napapol's special coach, climbed into the ring to congratulate Nishioka. Nishioka inherited the fullversion of the WBC super bantamweight title on December 18 of that year, when its previous holder, Israel Vázquez, was stripped for medical reasons. He defended that title by knocking out Mexico's Genaro García in the final round, again at the Pacifico Yokohama on January 3, 2009.

On May 23, 2009, Nishioka successfully defended his title against Jhonny González in front of 12,000 spectators mostly cheering for González at the Monterrey Arena in Mexico which had an outbreak of the H1N1 influenza. Nishioka recovered from a knockdown on the first round and went to knock out González in the third round. Nishioka's left blows including his left crosses have often been called Monster Left from those days. He succeeded in the third defense via a third-round technical knockout (TKO) against Ivan Hernández at the Yoyogi National Gymnasium on October 10 of the same year. Nishioka was presented with the 2009 WBC Knockout of the Year. He defeated Filipino Balweg Bangoyan via a fifth-round technical knockout at the Nippon Budokan on April 30, 2010 to have four consecutive title defenses all by knockout. The effects of trunk strengthening from the late 2009 have appeared, his balance has improved markedly.

On October 24 of the same year, Nishioka fought a mandatory bout against Rendall Munroe at the Ryōgoku Kokugikan, and defeated him by a convincing unanimous decision to extend his defending streak to five matches. Nishioka strongly desired a unification match with the other organizations' champion especially after that. When Nishioka was named Japan's Fighter of the Year in 2010, he received a video message from Fernando Montiel demanding a fight at the awards ceremony in January 2011. Nishioka said he was willing to fight anytime soon afterward and his camp intended to arrange a match, but the contract was not finalized as Montiel lost to Nonito Donaire in February. On April 8, 2011, he knocked out Argentina's Mauricio Javier Muñoz in the ninth round in his sixth defense which was moved from the Ryōgoku Kokugikan in Tokyo to the World Memorial Hall in Kobe due to the Tōhoku earthquake.

In his seventh defense on October 1, 2011, Nishioka fought against Rafael Márquez, who had been marked as one of his targets from around October 2003, at the MGM Grand Marquee Ballroom in Las Vegas. Márquez's long, well-extended jabs were effective in the early rounds. At the end of four rounds, all three judges scored it identically at 39–37 in favor of Márquez. Nishioka fully concentrated every second from the beginning of the fight. He landed well-timed left and right blows while circling right to nullify Márquez's right cross, and although not in principle for a southpaw, often circling left to negate Márquez's left hook and to throw his quicker and sharper angled left, to win the bout by a unanimous decision. Although Márquez did not admit his defeat and demanded a rematch, there was no disgust nor booing among the spectators.

In March 2012, Nishioka competed with Yuriorkis Gamboa for The Ring pound for pound Top 10, and barely missed it. The WBC granted Nishioka the Emeritus Champion status on March 15, 2012.

Nishioka lost to Nonito Donaire by technical knockout in 1:54 in the ninth round at the Home Depot Center in Carson, California on October 13, 2012. He had been ranked the number one super bantamweight in the world by The Ring, but was dropped to number three after the fight.

=== Retirement ===
About a month following his bout with Donaire, Nishioka announced his retirement from boxing.

== Professional boxing record ==
47 fights	39 wins	5 losses
By knockout	24	2
By decision	14	3
By disqualification	1	0
Draws	3	

No.	Result	Record	Opponent	Type	Round, time	Date	Location	Notes
47	Loss	39–5–3	Nonito Donaire	TKO	9 (12), 1:54	2012-10-13	Home Depot Center, Carson, California, U.S.	For WBO and vacant The Ring super-bantamweight titles
46	Win	39–4–3	Rafael Márquez	UD	12	2011-10-01	MGM Grand Marquee Ballroom, Paradise, Nevada, U.S.	Retained WBC super-bantamweight title
45	Win	38–4–3	Mauricio Javier Muñoz	KO	9 (12), 3:07	2011-04-08	World Memorial Hall, Kobe, Japan	Retained WBC super-bantamweight title
44	Win	37–4–3	Rendall Munroe	UD	12	2010-10-24	Ryōgoku Kokugikan, Tokyo, Japan	Retained WBC super-bantamweight title
43	Win	36–4–3	Balweg Bangoyan	TKO	5 (12), 1:14	2010-04-30	Nippon Budokan, Tokyo, Japan	Retained WBC super-bantamweight title
42	Win	35–4–3	Ivan Hernández	RTD	3 (12), 3:00	2009-10-10	Yoyogi National Gymnasium, Tokyo, Japan	Retained WBC super-bantamweight title
41	Win	34–4–3	Jhonny González	TKO	3 (12), 1:20	2009-05-23	Monterrey Arena, Monterrey, Mexico	Retained WBC super-bantamweight title
40	Win	33–4–3	Genaro García	TKO	12 (12), 0:57	2009-01-03	Pacifico, Yokohama, Japan	Retained WBC super-bantamweight title
39	Win	32–4–3	Napapol Kiatisakchokchai	UD	12	2008-09-15	Pacifico, Yokohama, Japan	Won WBC interim super-bantamweight title
38	Win	31–4–3	Jesús García	TKO	3 (8), 0:43	2008-04-19	Korakuen Hall, Tokyo, Japan	
37	Win	30–4–3	Pederito Laurente	KO	9 (10), 0:48	2007-12-15	Korakuen Hall, Tokyo, Japan	
36	Win	29–4–3	Jean Javier Sotelo	KO	7 (10), 0:23	2007-08-11	Korakuen Hall, Tokyo, Japan	
35	Win	28–4–3	José Alonso	KO	4 (8), 2:59	2006-11-16	The Joint, Paradise, Nevada, U.S.	
34	Win	27–4–3	Hugo Vargas	UD	10	2006-02-04	Korakuen Hall, Tokyo, Japan	
33	Win	26–4–3	Pederito Laurente	UD	10	2005-09-03	Korakuen Hall, Tokyo, Japan	
32	Win	25–4–3	Mustapha Abahraouhi	TKO	2 (8), 2:00	2005-04-29	Palais des sports, Marseille, France	
31	Win	24–4–3	Yoshikane Nakajima	UD	10	2004-10-30	Ryōgoku Kokugikan, Tokyo, Japan	
30	Loss	23–4–3	Veeraphol Sahaprom	UD	12	2004-03-06	Super Arena, Saitama, Japan	For WBC bantamweight title
29	Draw	23–3–3	Veeraphol Sahaprom	SD	12	2003-10-04	Ryōgoku Kokugikan, Tokyo, Japan	For WBC bantamweight title
28	Win	23–3–2	Evangelio Pérez	KO	1 (6), 1:32	7 Dec 2002	Mandalay Bay Events Center, Paradise, Nevada, U.S.	
27	Draw	22–3–2	Veeraphol Sahaprom	SD	12	2001-09-01	Yokohama Arena, Kanagawa, Japan	For WBC bantamweight title
26	Win	22–3–1	Sammy Ventura	KO	1 (10), 2:00	2001-03-11	Yokohama Arena, Kanagawa, Japan	
25	Win	21–3–1	Gerardo Martínez	UD	10	2000-11-05	Korakuen Hall, Tokyo, Japan	
24	Loss	20–3–1	Veeraphol Sahaprom	UD	12	2000-06-25	city gymnasium, Takasago, Japan	For WBC bantamweight title
23	Win	20–2–1	Rodel Llanita	KO	2 (10), 2:51	2000-03-12	Ryōgoku Kokugikan, Tokyo, Japan	
22	Win	19–2–1	Taiji Okamoto	UD	10	1999-12-19	City Gymnasium, Takasago, Japan	Retained Japanese bantamweight title
21	Win	18–2–1	Yodsingh Chuwatana	TKO	4 (10), 1:13	1999-08-07	Korakuen Hall, Tokyo, Japan	
20	Win	17–2–1	Shigeru Nakazato	TKO	8 (10), 1:21	1999-04-24	Kakogawa, Japan	Retained Japanese bantamweight title
19	Win	16–2–1	Jun'ichi Watanabe	KO	2 (10), 1:55	1998-12-29	Municipal Central Gymnasium, Osaka, Japan	Won vacant Japanese bantamweight title
18	Win	15–2–1	Joel Avila	KO	2 (10), 0:23	1998-09-23	General Gymnasium, Takasago, Japan	
17	Win	14–2–1	Jack Siahaya	KO	1 (10), 0:43	1998-06-29	Prefectural Gymnasium, Osaka, Japan	
16	Win	13–2–1	Julio César Cardona	DQ	5 (10), 2:58	1998-03-08	Yokohama Arena, Yokohama, Japan	Cardona disqualified for repeated low blows
15	Win	12–2–1	Dong-Soo Kim	TKO	4 (10), 3:01	1997-11-22	Osaka-jō Hall, Osaka, Japan	
14	Draw	11–2–1	Fernando Montilla	SD	10	1997-08-30	Himeji, Japan	
13	Win	11–2	Joel Junio	KO	2 (10), 2:53	1997-04-14	Prefectural Gymnasium, Osaka, Japan	
12	Win	10–2	Fuzi Armes	KO	6 (10), 2:40	1997-02-23	Himeji, Japan	
11	Win	9–2	Ahmad Fandi	UD	10	1996-10-19	Kobe, Japan	
10	Win	8–2	Donaldo Estella	UD	6	1996-08-25	Himeji, Japan	
9	Win	7–2	Reynante Rojo	UD	8	1996-05-19	Okinoerabujima, Japan	
8	Loss	6–2	Momotarō Kitajima	MD	6	1995-12-16	Fukuoka, Japan	
7	Win	6–1	Shin Kashiramoto	UD	6	1995-10-29	Civic Assembly Hall, Nagoya, Japan	
6	Win	5–1	Isao Ohno	UD	6	1995-09-18	Prefectural Gymnasium, Osaka, Japan	
5	Win	4–1	Hiroyasu Uchida	KO	1 (4), 1:31	1995-08-15	Prefectural Gymnasium, Osaka, Japan	
4	Win	3–1	Nobuyuki Kihara	UD	4	1995-06-17	Himeji, Japan	
3	Win	2–1	Shigeaki Nakamasa	KO	1 (4), 2:41	1995-03-25	Himeji, Japan	
2	Loss	1–1	Masahiko Nakamura	KO	4 (4), 2:12	1995-02-04	Korakuen Hall, Tokyo, Japan	
1	Win	1–0	Yūkō Shishido	KO	1 (4), 2:55	1994-12-11	Himeji, Japan	

== Titles in boxing ==
=== Major world titles ===
- WBC super bantamweight champion (122 lbs)

=== Interim world titles ===
- WBC interim super bantamweight champion (122 lbs)

=== Regional/International titles ===
- Japanese bantamweight champion (118 lbs)

=== Honorary titles ===
- WBC Emeritus Champion

== See also ==
- List of WBC world champions
- List of super bantamweight boxing champions
- List of Japanese boxing world champions
- Boxing in Japan

== Bibliography ==
- Masahiro Miyazaki (April 10, 2010). "The Biography 世界チャンピオンの肖像 天才は孤高の隘路を歩き続ける". Boxing Magazine (in Japanese). No. April 2010 issue. Tokyo, Japan: Baseball Magazine Sha Co., Ltd. pp. 16–18.
- Boxing Magazine editorial department, ed. (March 1, 2004). "西岡利晃". 日本プロボクシングチャンピオン大鑑 (in Japanese). Tokyo, Japan: Baseball Magazine Sha Co., Ltd. p. 223. ISBN 978-4-583-03784-4.
- Toshiki Sunohara (April 27, 1999). ポスト辰吉を狙う国内バンタム級. World Boxing (in Japanese) (special issue). Tokyo, Japan: Nippon Sports Publishing Co., Ltd.: 43.
- ライバルをぶっ倒せ!. World Boxing (in Japanese) (special issue). Tokyo, Japan: Nippon Sports Publishing Co., Ltd.: 8 April 18, 2000.
- Boxing Magazine editorial department, ed. (May 31, 2002). 日本プロボクシング史 世界タイトルマッチで見る50年 (Japan Pro Boxing History – 50 Years of World Title Bouts) (in Japanese). Tokyo, Japan: Baseball Magazine Sha Co., Ltd. p. 170. ISBN 978-4-583-03695-3.
- Joe Koizumi (October 15, 2011). MACC Publications Inc (ed.). ジョー小泉のボクシングは技術だ. Ironman. Boxing Beat (in Japanese) (special issue). Tokyo, Japan: Fitness Sports Co., Ltd.: 94.
- Boxing Magazine editorial department (with Japan Boxing Commission, Japan Pro Boxing Association), ed. (April 30, 2005). "2004年出場選手全戦績". 日本ボクシング年鑑2005 (Japan Boxing Year Book 2005) (in Japanese). Tokyo, Japan: Baseball Magazine Sha Co., Ltd. p. 133. ISBN 978-4-583-03849-0.

Sporting positions
Regional boxing titles
Vacant Title last held by Shin Yamato	Japanese bantamweight champion December 29, 1998 – March 2000; Vacated	Vacant Title next held by Nobuaki Naka
World boxing titles
Vacant Title last held by Óscar Larios	WBC super-bantamweight champion Interim title September 15, 2008 – December 18, 2008; Promoted	Vacant Title next held by Julio Ceja
Preceded by Israel Vázquez stripped	WBC super-bantamweight champion December 18, 2008 – March 15, 2012; Status changed	Vacant Title next held by Abner Mares
