= René Arredondo =

Mexican boxer

Personal information
- Born: 15 June 1961 (age 65) Apatzingan, Mexico
- Weight: Welterweight; Light welterweight

Boxing career

Boxing record
- Total fights: 58
- Wins: 46
- Win by KO: 40
- Losses: 12
- Draws: 0

René Arredondo (born 15 June 1961) is a Mexican former WBC Jr. Welterweight champion.

== Early life ==
Arredondo was born 15 June 1961 in Apatzingan, Mexico. He is the younger brother of former World Champion Ricardo Arredondo, and Roberto Arredondo who fought under the name of "Chiba Arredondo" in Japan.

== Career ==
Arredondo turned professional in 1979. He mainly fought in Mexico for first three years, then moved the main battlefield to the United States since 1983, and won the World Boxing Council (WBC) junior welterweight title by beating Lonnie Smith via the fifth round on a technical knockout (TKO) in 1986. He lost the title in his first defense against Tsuyoshi Hamada on a first-round KO.

In 1987 he rematched Hamada and regained the title in the sixth round on a TKO. In his first defense, he again lost the title to Roger Mayweather via the sixth round on a TKO. However, Arredondo continued to fight, capturing the North American Boxing Organization (NABO) light middleweight title against Jeff Leggett via a 10th-round TKO in Tijuana, Baja California in August 1995, Mexico.

Arredondo retired in 1997. He is currently working in Los Angeles at several boxing gyms, where he has a thriving personal training business. He is also married with two grown children.

== See also ==
- WBC Legends of Boxing Museum
- List of WBC world champions
- List of Mexican boxing world champions
- List of super lightweight boxing champions
- List of boxing families

Preceded by Lonnie Smith	WBC Junior Welterweight Champion; 5 May 1986–24 July 1986	Succeeded by Tsuyoshi Hamada
Preceded by Tsuyoshi Hamada	WBC Junior Welterweight Champion; 22 July 1987–12 November 1987	Succeeded by Roger Mayweather
