= Willie Jorrín =

American boxer

Personal information
- Born: Guillermo Jaime Jorrín; November 12, 1969 (age 56) Sacramento, California, U.S.
- Height: 5 ft 5 1/2 in (166 cm)
- Weight: Super bantamweight

Boxing career
- Reach: 68 in (173 cm)
- Stance: Orthodox

Boxing record
- Total fights: 32
- Wins: 29
- Win by KO: 13
- Losses: 2
- Draws: 1

Guillermo Jaime Jorrín (born November 12, 1969), known as Willie Jorrín, is a Mexican-American former professional boxer who competed from 1993 to 2003. He held the WBC super bantamweight title from 2000 to 2002. Jorrín was trained by five-time Trainer of the Year Freddie Roach.

== Amateur career ==
Jorrín lost to Wayne McCullough as an amateur in Portland, Oregon.

== Professional career ==
Willie made his professional debut on February 12, 1993, with a first round knockout victory over Esau Diegues. This was the first of three consecutive first-round knockout victories for Jorrín. On October 1 of that year, Pat Chávez became the first person to go the distance with Jorrín, losing a six-round decision to the Sacramento fighter.

He faced Enrique Jupiter on June 7, 1997. Jupiter was a ranked contender and Jorrín beat him by a ten-round unanimous decision. Jorrín then became a ranked challenger by the WBC. Jorrin outpointed Juan Luis Torres, also over ten rounds, on December 4, 1997.

Jorrín won all three of his fights in 1998, including a four-round knockout over Enrique Valenzuela. He kept his winning ways in 1999, winning three fights, among them, a twelve-round decision over Aristead Clayton and a five-round knockout over Juan Luis Torres in a rematch. After those wins, he was ranked as the world's number one contender by the WBC.

=== WBC Super Bantamweight Championship ===
In September 2000, Jorrín took on the road, going to Manchester, England, where he became world champion by beating Michael Brodie on September 9 with a majority decision for the WBC's world Super Bantamweight title.

For his first defense, he won over Óscar Larios by decision in twelve back home in Sacramento on an ESPN televised fight on January 19, 2001. He then went to Japan, where he dropped Osamu Sato in round three of his second defense, but was only given a draw (tie) by the judges on February 5, 2002. Then Willie lost to Larios in a rematch, Jorrín lost his WBC's world title.

Jorrín started a quest to try to recover his world title almost immediately, and on April 25, 2003, he beat John Hoffman by a knockout in two rounds at Rosemont, Illinois. In his next fight, on November 6 at Phoenix, however, he suffered a setback, losing by unanimous decision in ten rounds to Christian Favela. He retired after that contest.

== Professional boxing record ==
32 fights	29 wins	2 losses
By knockout	13	1
By decision	16	1
Draws	1	

No.	Result	Record	Opponent	Type	Round, time	Date	Location	Notes
32	Loss	29–2–1	Cristian Favela	MD	10 (10)	2003-11-06	Celebrity Theatre, Phoenix, Arizona, U.S.	
31	Win	29–1–1	John Hoffman	TKO	2 (8)	2003-04-25	Ramada Inn, Rosemont, Illinois, U.S.	
30	Loss	28–1–1	Óscar Larios	TKO	1 (12)	2002-11-01	ARCO Arena, Sacramento, California, U.S.	Lost WBC super-bantamweight title
29	Draw	28–0–1	Osamu Sato	MD	12 (12)	2002-02-05	Ariake Coliseum, Tokyo, Japan	Retained WBC super-bantamweight title
28	Win	28–0	Óscar Larios	UD	12 (12)	2001-01-19	ARCO Arena, Sacramento, California, U.S.	Retained WBC super-bantamweight title
27	Win	27–0	Michael Brodie	MD	12 (12)	2000-09-09	Bowlers Exhibition Centre, Manchester, England, U.K.	Won vacant WBC super-bantamweight title
26	Win	26–0	Marcos Badillo	UD	10 (10)	2000-06-09	Feather Falls Casino, Oroville, California, U.S.	
25	Win	25–0	Juan Luis Torres	TD	5 (10)	1999-10-12	Cache Creek Casino Resort, Brooks, California, U.S.	
24	Win	24–0	Aristead Clayton	SD	12 (12)	1999-07-02	Radisson Hotel, Sacramento, California, U.S.	Won NABF super-bantamweight title
23	Win	23–0	Edgar Garcia	UD	10 (10)	1999-03-28	Radisson Hotel, Sacramento, California, U.S.	
22	Win	22–0	Julio Cesar Cardona	KO	2 (10)	1998-08-20	ARCO Arena, Sacramento, California, U.S.	
21	Win	21–0	Antonio Oscar Salas	KO	5 (8)	1998-05-09	ARCO Arena, Sacramento, California, U.S.	
20	Win	20–0	Luis Enrique Valenzuela	KO	4 (10)	1998-03-30	Radisson Hotel, Sacramento, California, U.S.	
19	Win	19–0	Juan Luis Torres	UD	10 (10)	1997-12-04	Memorial Auditorium, Sacramento, California, U.S.	
18	Win	18–0	Juan Manuel Chavez	UD	10 (10)	1997-08-22	Memorial Auditorium, Sacramento, California, U.S.	
17	Win	17–0	Enrique Jupiter	PTS	10 (10)	1997-06-07	ARCO Arena, Sacramento, California, U.S.	
16	Win	16–0	Jorge Parra	TKO	7 (10)	1997-02-10	Memorial Auditorium, Sacramento, California, U.S.	
15	Win	15–0	Jose Manjarrez	UD	10 (10)	1996-11-14	Memorial Auditorium, Sacramento, California, U.S.	
14	Win	14–0	Roberto Lopez	SD	10 (10)	1996-07-01	Radisson Hotel, Sacramento, California, U.S.	
13	Win	13–0	Juan Carlos Salazar	KO	2 (10)	1996-04-22	Radisson Hotel, Sacramento, California, U.S.	
12	Win	12–0	Antonio Ramirez	UD	10 (10)	1996-03-18	Radisson Hotel, Sacramento, California, U.S.	
11	Win	11–0	Lazaro Padilla	KO	5 (10)	1995-11-21	Radisson Hotel, Sacramento, California, U.S.	
10	Win	10–0	Max Maldonado	KO	8 (10)	1995-05-13	ARCO Arena, Sacramento, California, U.S.	
9	Win	9–0	Victor Manuel Flores	TKO	3 (6)	1995-01-28	Reno Hilton, Reno, Nevada, U.S.	
8	Win	8–0	Fernando Sanchez	UD	6 (6)	1994-11-10	Reno Hilton, Reno, Nevada, U.S.	
7	Win	7–0	Ernesto Medina	TKO	2 (?)	1994-08-02	Cache Creek Casino Resort, Brooks, California, U.S.	
6	Win	6–0	Julio Sanchez Leon	UD	6 (6)	1994-04-09	Reno Hilton, Reno, Nevada, U.S.	
5	Win	5–0	David Munoz	UD	8 (8)	1994-03-08	Radisson Hotel, Sacramento, California, U.S.	
4	Win	4–0	Pat Chavez	UD	6 (6)	1993-10-01	ARCO Arena, Sacramento, California, U.S.	
3	Win	3–0	Ralph Chavez	KO	1 (?)	1993-08-27	ARCO Arena, Sacramento, California, U.S.	
2	Win	2–0	Marco Vargas	KO	1 (6)	1993-05-17	Radisson Hotel, Sacramento, California, U.S.	
1	Win	1–0	Esau Dieguez	KO	1 (4)	1993-02-12	ARCO Arena, Sacramento, California, U.S.	

== See also ==
- List of Mexican boxing world champions
- List of world super-bantamweight boxing champions

Sporting positions
Regional boxing titles
Preceded by Aristead Clayton	NABF super-bantamweight champion July 2, 1999 – 2000; Vacated	Vacant Title next held by Roberto López
World boxing titles
Vacant Title last held by Erik Morales	WBC super-bantamweight champion September 9, 2000 – November 1, 2002	Succeeded by Óscar Larios
