= Manny Pacquiao vs. Óscar Larios =

2006 boxing match

Mano-A-Mano
- Date: July 2, 2006
- Venue: Araneta Coliseum, Quezon City, Philippines
- Titles on the line: WBC International super featherweight title

Tale of the tape
Boxer	Manny Pacquiao	Óscar Larios
Nickname	"Pac-Man"	"Chololo"
Hometown	General Santos, Soccsksargen, Philippines	Zapopan, Jalisco, Mexico
Pre-fight record	41–3–2 (32 KO)	56–4–1 (36 KO)
Age	27 years, 6 months	29 years, 8 months
Height	5 ft 6 1/2 in (169 cm)	5 ft 8 in (173 cm)
Weight	129 1/2 lb (59 kg)	129 lb (59 kg)
Style	Southpaw	Orthodox
Recognition	WBC/WBO/The Ring; No. 1 Ranked Super Featherweight; WBA; No. 2 Ranked Super Featherweight; IBF; No. 4 Ranked Super Featherweight; WBC International super featherweight champion The Ring No. 3 ranked pound-for-pound fighter 3-division world champion	WBC; No. 1 Ranked Super Bantamweight; WBO; No. 11 Ranked Super Bantamweight; The Ring; No. 2 Ranked Super Bantamweight; Former WBC super bantamweight champion

Result
- Pacquiao wins via 12-round unanimous decision (117-110, 118-108, 120-106)

Manny Pacquiao vs. Óscar Larios, billed as Mano-A-Mano, was a professional boxing super featherweight fight held on July 2, 2006, at the Araneta Coliseum, Quezon City, in the Philippines and was a production of ABS-CBN Sports and promoted by Manny Pacquiao's MP Promotions and Golden Boy Promotions.

== Background ==
The judges were Humbert Furgoni from France, Daniel van de Wiele from Belgium, and Noppharat Srichharoen from Thailand with referee Bruce McTavish and ring announcer Michael Buffer. It was aired in the Philippines on free-to-air national television network ABS-CBN, worldwide through The Filipino Channel, and through pay per view on In Demand, DirecTV, and Sky Cable.

== The fight ==
Pacquiao won the fight via unanimous decision, knocking down Larios two times. The three judges scored the fight 117–110, 118–108 and 120–106 all for Pacquiao.

== Aftermath ==
On July 3, 2006, the day after winning the fight against Larios, President Gloria Macapagal Arroyo personally bestowed the Order of Lakandula with the rank of "Champion for Life" (Kampeon Habambuhay) and the plaque of appreciation to Pacquiao in a simple ceremony at the Presidential Study of Malacañang Palace.

== Reception ==
Many people criticized the bout for its expensive tickets. A few days before the fight, more than half of the seats were not sold. Because of this, ABS-CBN gave away millions worth of tickets for free and offered the remaining tickets directly to Filipino celebrities, politicians, and businessmen. In the end, the tickets were sold out with an earning of 96.2 million pesos. The fight sold 120,000 pay per view (PPV) in the United States generating a total of US$4.79 million.

The bout is currently the 17th most watched television broadcasts in the Philippines with a rating of 54.4% based on the data of AGB Nielsen Philippines.

== Undercard ==
Confirmed bouts:

Weight Class		vs.		Method	Round	Time	Notes
Mini-flyweight	(Philippines) Manny Pacquiao (c)	def.	(Mexico) Óscar Larios	UD	12	3:00	^{Note 1}
Bantamweight	(Philippines) Gerry Penalosa	def.	(Mexico) Tomas Rojas	UD	10	3:00
Featherweight	(Philippines) Jimrex Jaca	def.	(Mexico) Hector Javier Marquez	TD	7/10	2:08	^{Note 2}
Super Bantamweight	(Philippines) Micheal Domingo	draw	(Mexico) Alejandro Montiel	TKO	7 (10)	1:04
Lightweight	(Australia) Czar Amonsot	def.	(Mexico) Silverio Ortiz	UD	10	3:00
Super bantamweight	(Philippines) Jhonel Lastimosa	draw	(Philippines) Glenn Poras	UD	8	3:00	^{Note 3}
Lightweight	(Philippines) Dennis Laurente	def.	(Russia) Rustam Nugaev	UD	8	0:53
Bantamweight	(Philippines) Ernel Fontanilla	def.	(Philippines) Jundy Maraon	TD	2 (8)	0:52
flyweight	(Philippines) Richie Mepranum	def.	(Philippines) Noli James Maquilan	SD	6/6

^Note 1 For WBC International super featherweight title
^Note 2 Fight stopped due to resulting cut above Jaca's left eye in round 7.
^Note 4 Fight stopped after Chouhan was unable to continue due to a severe cut title

== Broadcasting ==
Country	Broadcaster
Mexico	TV Azteca
Philippines	ABS-CBN
United Kingdom	Sky Sports
United States	DirecTV

Preceded by vs. Erik Morales II	Manny Pacquiao's bouts July 2, 2006	Succeeded by vs. Erik Morales III
Preceded by vs. Israel Vázquez	Oscar Larios' bouts July 2, 2006	Succeeded by vs. Roberto Bonilla
