= Tsuyoshi Hamada =

Japanese boxer (born 1960)

Tsuyoshi Hamada 浜田 剛史
Personal information
- Nationality: Japanese
- Born: Tsuyoshi Hamada; Japanese: 浜田 剛 29 November 1960 (age 65) Nakagasuku, USCAR (nowadays Nakagasuku, Okinawa, Japan)
- Height: 5 ft 7 in (1.70 m)
- Weight: junior welterweight

Boxing career
- Stance: southpaw

Boxing record
- Total fights: 24
- Wins: 21
- Win by KO: 19
- Losses: 2
- No contests: 1

Tsuyoshi Hamada (浜田 剛史, Hamada Tsuyoshi; born November 29, 1960) is a retired Japanese professional boxer who is a former WBC world junior welterweight champion.

== Biography ==
Hamada was born in Nakagusuku, Okinawa, and began boxing at the age of fifteen. He won the Japan's inter-high school championship in the featherweight division in 1978. He had an amateur record of 37–6 (28 KOs).

=== Professional boxing career ===
Having turned professional in 1979, he made his debut under his real name Tsuyoshi Hamada, written as 浜田 剛, in Tokyo on May 21. His ring name was changed into 浜田 剛史, pronounced the same, in 1983.

Hamada fractured his left hand four times since 1981, and received bone grafting twice. Then, he was not able to fight for two years. Hanging his left arm with a triangular bandage, he hit a punching bag only with his right fist. In 1984, after two away matches in Los Angeles, Hamada fought against the former WBA world lightweight champion Claude Noel to knock him out in the fourth round at the Korakuen Hall on September 9. He gained the Japanese lightweight title on December 2 of that year. In 1985, after setting a Japanese record of fifteen consecutive knockout wins, he also captured the OPBF lightweight title in Naha, Okinawa, in the next fight on July 7. However, as he had damaged the meniscus of his right knee before that match, his boxing career was interrupted again. Originally Hamada excelled in the left cross, but during a long period that he underwent medical treatment for his fist injury, he intensively practiced the right hook which brought him a championship belt.

On July 24, 1986, Hamada moved up in weight division and knocked out René Arredondo who exceeded him four inches respectively in height and reach, in the first round to gain the WBC world junior welterweight title. In his first defense on December 2 of that year, he beat Ronnie Shields who had 270 amateur fights including a victory over Thomas Hearns, by a split decision. On July 22, 1987, he rematched Arredondo in his second defense where he lost the title via a sixth-round technical knockout. Those three world title matches were all held at the Ryōgoku Kokugikan in Tokyo, and one million spectators altogether attended them. He aimed at the recapture of the title, but opted for retirement, because his right knee injury did not recover and because Arredondo had been no longer a champion after losing to Roger Mayweather in his first defense.

=== Personal life and post-retirement ===
The following anecdote shows the strength of his intention. Three months before the fight for the world title in 1986, a meniscus injury which requires a surgery was discovered as a result of the arthroscopy of his right knee. Although Hamada was aware that the anesthetic effect would not persist, he asked a doctor to do it immediately and had surgery without complaining of a pain. As of twenty years after retirement, his knee still aches. "My body is always painful. I recognize being painful is my body, so I am all right," Hamada says with smile.

Currently Hamada is a commentator of the boxing broadcast on Nippon Television and WOWOW. He monthly writes a review which analyzes the world's leading boxers for the Japanese boxing magazine Boxing Beat, and is also the representative director of the company that manufactures and sells health foods and supplements. Since March 14, 2007, he is the representative of the Teiken Promotions that is a relevant organization to the Teiken Boxing Gym to which he had belonged during his career as a boxer.

The main protagonist of the manga Hajime no Ippo, Makunouchi Ippo is loosely based on Hamada.

== See also ==
- List of WBC world champions
- List of super lightweight boxing champions

== Bibliography ==
- Boxing Magazine editorial department, ed. (May 31, 2002). 日本プロボクシング史 世界タイトルマッチで見る50年 (Japan Pro Boxing History – 50 Years of World Title Bouts) (in Japanese). Tokyo, Japan: Baseball Magazine Sha Co., Ltd. pp. 256–257, 297. ISBN 978-4-583-03695-3.

Preceded by René Arredondo	WBC Junior Welterweight Champion; July 24, 1986–July 22, 1987	Succeeded by René Arredondo
