= Takahiro Ao =

Japanese boxer (born 1984)

Personal information
- Born: 粟生 隆寛; 6 April 1984 (age 42) Ichihara, Chiba, Japan
- Height: 5 ft 6 1/2 in (169 cm)
- Weight: Featherweight; Super-featherweight; Lightweight

Boxing career
- Reach: 68 1/2 in (174 cm)
- Stance: Southpaw

Boxing record
- Total fights: 33
- Wins: 28
- Win by KO: 12
- Losses: 3
- Draws: 1
- No contests: 1

Takahiro Ao (粟生 隆寛, Aō Takahiro; born 6 April 1984) is a Japanese former professional boxer who competed from 2003 to 2018. He is a world champion in two weight classes, having held the World Boxing Council (WBC) featherweight title in 2009 and the WBC super-featherweight title from 2010 to 2012.

== Professional career ==
Ao turned professional in September 2003 at the Korakuen Hall, Tokyo. In his debut Ao defeated fellow Japanese boxer Hiroshi Kashihara with a second round knockout.

Ao is managed by the Teiken Boxing Gym in Tokyo, and trains under Sendai Tanaka's guidance. He has often attended Marco Antonio Barrera's training camp since 2003, because he was appreciated for his speed and heavy fists, and served as Barrera's chief sparring partner in August 2007.

After thirteen unbeaten fights, Ao beat Koji Umetsu for the Japanese featherweight title in March 2007.

Ao lost via split decision to champion Óscar Larios on 16 October 2008. Despite flooring Larios in the 4th round, Ao managed to lose a decision in the close and contested bout.

Fortunate for him, Ao got another chance at Larios' title on 12 March 2009. There, he applied more offensive tactics which resulted Larios dropping in the 12th round. Ao won the match by unanimous decision. On his first defense of the title held on July 14 that same year, Ao lost to Elio Rojas by unanimous decision.

== Professional boxing record ==
33 fights	28 wins	3 losses
By knockout	12	0
By decision	16	3
Draws	1	
No contests	1	

No.	Result	Record	Opponent	Type	Round, time	Date	Location	Notes
33	Win	28–3–1 (1)	Gamaliel Diaz	UD	8	1 Mar 2018	Kokugikan, Tokyo, Japan	
32	NC	27–3–1 (1)	Raymundo Beltran	NC	12	1 May 2015	The Cosmopolitan of Las Vegas, Las Vegas, Nevada, US	For vacant WBO lightweight title
31	Win	27–3–1	Juan Carlos Salgado	UD	10	22 Oct 2014	Yoyogi#2 Gymnasium, Tokyo, Japan	
30	Win	26–3–1	Marco Antonio López	UD	10	23 Apr 2014	Osaka-Jo Hall, Osaka, Japan	
29	Win	25–3–1	Edgar Alejandro Lomeli	KO	1 (10), 3:03	10 Nov 2013	Kokugikan, Tokyo, Japan	
28	Win	24–3–1	Hardy Paredes	KO	2 (10), 2:51	13 Jul 2013	Hollywood Park Casino, Inglewood, California, US	
27	Loss	23–3–1	Gamaliel Díaz	UD	12	27 Oct 2012	Tokyo International Forum, Tokyo, Japan	Lost WBC super-featherweight title
26	Win	23–2–1	Terdsak Kokietgym	UD	12	6 Apr 2012	Tokyo International Forum, Tokyo, Japan	Retained WBC super-featherweight title
25	Win	22–2–1	Devis Boschiero	SD	12	6 Nov 2011	Yoyogi National Gymnasium, Tokyo, Japan	Retained WBC super-featherweight title
24	Win	21–2–1	Humberto Gutiérrez	KO	4 (12), 1:06	8 Apr 2011	World Memorial Hall, Kobe, Japan	Retained WBC super-featherweight title
23	Win	20–2–1	Vitali Tajbert	UD	12	26 Nov 2010	Nippon Gaishi Hall, Nagoya, Japan	Won WBC super-featherweight title
22	Win	19–2–1	Whyber García	TKO	8 (10), 1:48	30 Apr 2010	Nippon Budokan, Tokyo, Japan	
21	Win	18–2–1	Feider Viloria	UD	10	18 Dec 2009	World Memorial Hall, Kobe, Japan	
20	Loss	17–2–1	Elio Rojas	UD	12	14 Jul 2009	Korakuen Hall, Tokyo, Japan	Lost WBC featherweight title
19	Win	17–1–1	Óscar Larios	UD	12	12 Mar 2009	Korakuen Hall, Tokyo, Japan	Won WBC featherweight title
18	Loss	16–1–1	Óscar Larios	SD	12	16 Oct 2008	Yoyogi National Gymnasium, Tokyo, Japan	For WBC featherweight title
17	Draw	16–0–1	Hiroyuki Enoki	UD	12	5 Apr 2008	JCB Hall, Tokyo, Japan	For Japanese and OBPF featherweight titles
16	Win	16–0	Noriyuki Ueno	UD	10	3 Nov 2007	Korakuen Hall, Tokyo, Japan	Retained Japanese featherweight title
15	Win	15–0	Keisuke Akiba	UD	10	7 Jul 2007	Korakuen Hall, Tokyo, Japan	Retained Japanese featherweight title
14	Win	14–0	Koji Umetsu	UD	10	3 Mar 2007	Korakuen Hall, Tokyo, Japan	Won Japanese featherweight title
13	Win	13–0	Gabriel Pérez	TKO	6 (6), 1:27	13 Nov 2006	Nippon Budokan, Tokyo, Japan	
12	Win	12–0	Francisco Dianzo	UD	10	3 Jun 2006	Korakuen Hall, Tokyo, Japan	
11	Win	11–0	Oswaldo Juarez	KO	2 (6), 2:14	25 Mar 2006	World Memorial Hall, Kobe, Japan	
10	Win	10–0	Richard Carrillo	UD	10	7 Jan 2006	Korakuen Hall, Tokyo, Japan	
9	Win	9–0	Jae-Choon Moon	TKO	1 (6), 2:54	25 Sep 2005	Yokohama Arena, Yokohama, Japan	
8	Win	8–0	Yoshinori Miyata	UD	10	2 Jul 2005	Korakuen Hall, Tokyo, Japan	
7	Win	7–0	Mario Rodríguez	UD	6	16 April 2005	Nippon Budokan, Tokyo, Japan	
6	Win	6–0	Sang-Chan Na	KO	1 (10), 3:07	5 Feb 2005	Korakuen Hall, Tokyo, Japan	
5	Win	5–0	Yosuke Sato	UD	8	2 Oct 2004	Korakuen Hall, Tokyo, Japan	
4	Win	4–0	Hisami Kitahara	TKO	5 (8), 2:22	1 May 2004	Korakuen Hall, Tokyo, Japan	
3	Win	3–0	Nilyon Nuñez	KO	3 (6), 1:23	31 Jan 2004	Poliedro de Caracas, Caracas, Venezuela	
2	Win	2–0	Takashi Saryo	KO	1 (6), 2:26	6 Dec 2003	Korakuen Hall, Tokyo, Japan	
1	Win	1–0	Hiroshi Kashihara	TKO	2 (6), 0:49	6 Sep 2003	Korakuen Hall, Tokyo, Japan	

== Titles in boxing ==
=== Major world titles ===
- WBC featherweight champion (126 lbs)
- WBC super featherweight champion (130 lbs)

=== Regional/International titles ===
- Japanese featherweight champion (126 lbs)

== See also ==
- List of world featherweight boxing champions
- List of world super-featherweight boxing champions
- List of Japanese boxing world champions
- Boxing in Japan

Sporting positions
World boxing titles
Preceded by Óscar Larios	WBC featherweight champion 12 March 2009 – 14 July 2009	Succeeded by Elio Rojas
Preceded by Vitali Tajbert	WBC super-featherweight champion 26 November 2010 – 27 October 2012	Succeeded by Gamaliel Díaz
