= Akifumi Shimoda =

Japanese boxer

Personal information
- Nationality: Japanese
- Born: 下田昭文; September 11, 1984 (age 41) Sapporo, Japan
- Height: 5 ft 7 1/2 in (171 cm)
- Weight: Super bantamweight

Boxing career
- Reach: 65 in (165 cm)
- Stance: Southpaw

Boxing record
- Total fights: 39
- Wins: 31
- Win by KO: 14
- Losses: 6
- Draws: 2

Akifumi Shimoda (下田 昭文, Shimoda, Akifumi; born September 11, 1984) is a Featherweight boxer from Japan and the former world champion of WBA at Super bantamweight. He was born in Sapporo, Hokkaido and grew up in Kure City in Hiroshima Prefecture. He currently lives in Tokyo. Shimoda has trained under Yūichi Kasai's instruction at the Teiken Boxing Gym in Tokyo.

== Biography ==
Akifumi Shimoda was born in Kure city of Hiroshima Prefecture, Japan on September 11, 1984.

=== Debut ===
Shimoda turned professional in 2003. On January 18, 2003, he fought against Kazumasa Watanabe, and won his debut via the first round knockout on 18 January. After this victory, won eleven straight victories.

=== Winning national and international title ===
On April 9, 2007, Shimoda captured the Japanese super bantamweight title and defended it four times. On March 28, 2010, Shimoda captured the OPBF super bantamweight title, then defended it once.

=== Winning the world title ===
Shimoda won the WBA super bantamweight title from Korean Ryol Li Lee via a twelfth round unanimous decision in the latter's first title defence in Tokyo at the Ariake Coliseum on January 31, 2011. He would lose the title in his first defense against Rico Ramos.

== Professional boxing record ==
39 fights	31 wins	6 losses
By knockout	14	2
By decision	17	4
Draws	2	

No.	Result	Record	Opponent	Type	Round, time	Date	Location	Notes
39	Loss	31–6–2	Shota Hayashi	UD	10 (10)	2016-12-31	Memorial Center, Gifu, Japan	For Japanese Featherweight title
38	Win	31–5–2	Gadwin Tubigon	TKO	2 (8)	2016-10-01	Korakuen Hall, Tokyo, Japan	
37	Loss	30–5–2	Satoshi Hosono	SD	10 (10)	2015-12-29	Ariake Coliseum, Tokyo, Japan	For Japanese Featherweight title
36	Win	30–4–2	Jerry Nardo	TKO	5 (10)	2015-10-03	Korakuen Hall, Tokyo, Japan	
35	Win	29–4–2	Gosuke Seki	UD	8 (8)	2015-06-06	Korakuen Hall, Tokyo, Japan	
34	Loss	28–4–2	Marvin Sonsona	KO	3 (12) 1:17	2014-02-22	Cotai Arena, Macau	
33	Win	28–3–2	Alejandro Hernandez	UD	10	2013-09-07	Korakuen Hall, Tokyo, Japan	
32	Draw	27–3–2	Roli Gasca	MD	10	2013-04-06	Korakuen Hall, Tokyo, Japan	
31	Win	27–3–1	Hugo Partida	TKO	9 (10) 1:18	2012-11-14	Korakuen Hall, Tokyo, Japan	
30	Win	26–3–1	Richard Betos	UD	10	2012-08-04	Korakuen Hall, Tokyo, Japan	
29	Win	25–3–1	Azael Gonzalez	TKO	10 (10) 1:00	2012-04-16	Korakuen Hall, Tokyo, Japan	
28	Win	24–3–1	Jonel Alibio	UD	10	2011-12-03	Korakuen Hall, Tokyo, Japan	
27	Loss	23–3–1	Rico Ramos	KO	7 (12) 2:46	2011-07-09	Boardwalk Hall, Atlantic City, New Jersey, U.S.	Lost WBA super bantamweight title
26	Win	23–2–1	Ryol Li Lee	UD	12	2011-01-31	Ariake Coliseum, Tokyo, Japan	Won WBA super bantamweight title
25	Win	22–2–1	Chang-Hyun Son	TD	5 (12) 0:34	2010-08-07	Korakuen Hall, Tokyo, Japan	Retained OPBF Super Bantamweight title
24	Win	21–2–1	Hiromasa Ohashi	UD	12	2010-03-28	International Conference Hall, Nagoya, Aichi, Japan	Won OPBF Super Bantamweight title
23	Win	20–2–1	Sanghiran Lukbanyai	TKO	6 (8) 2:23	2009-10-10	Yoyogi National Gymnasium, Tokyo, Japan	
22	Win	19–2–1	Mauricio Becerril	TKO	1 (8) 2:15	2009-06-27	Plaza de Toros, Nuevo Laredo, Tamaulipas, Mexico	
21	Draw	18–2–1	Jose Arboleda	TD	3 (10) 1:08	2009-02-21	Korakuen Hall, Tokyo, Japan	
20	Loss	18–2	Kazuma Miura	TD	8 (10) 0:38	2008-10-04	Korakuen Hall, Tokyo, Japan	Lost Japanese Super Bantamweight title
19	Win	18–1	Daisuke Yamanaka	UD	10	2008-04-05	JCB Hall, Tokyo, Japan	Retained Japanese Super Bantamweight title
18	Win	17–1	Hidenori Kobayashi	UD	10	2007-12-01	Korakuen Hall, Tokyo, Japan	Retained Japanese Super Bantamweight title
17	Win	16–1	Yu Enya	UD	10	2007-08-04	Korakuen Hall, Tokyo, Japan	Retained Japanese Super Bantamweight title
16	Win	15–1	Daisuke Yamanaka	UD	10	2007-04-09	Korakuen Hall, Tokyo, Japan	Won Japanese Super Bantamweight title
15	Win	14–1	Sonny Gonzales	UD	6	2006-11-13	Nippon Budokan, Tokyo, Japan	
14	Win	13–1	Gerardo Martinez	TKO	7 (10) 2:10	2006-06-03	Korakuen Hall, Tokyo, Japan	
13	Loss	12–1	Mikihito Seto	MD	10	2006-02-04	Korakuen Hall, Tokyo, Japan	
12	Win	12–0	Tsutomu Odajima	UD	10	2005-11-05	Korakuen Hall, Tokyo, Japan	
11	Win	11–0	Dechsayarm Sithpordam	UD	8	2005-09-03	Korakuen Hall, Tokyo, Japan	
10	Win	10–0	Shusaku Ino	RTD	4 (8) 3:00	2005-07-02	Korakuen Hall, Tokyo, Japan	
9	Win	9–0	Takuma Shiraishi	TKO	8 (8) 0:42	2005-02-05	Korakuen Hall, Tokyo, Japan	
8	Win	8–0	Takayuki Takeshita	UD	6	2004-10-02	Korakuen Hall, Tokyo, Japan	
7	Win	7–0	Hiroshi Sasaki	TKO	4 (6) 1:41	2004-07-03	Korakuen Hall, Tokyo, Japan	
6	Win	6–0	Kazunori Takayama	UD	6	2003-11-02	Korakuen Hall, Tokyo, Japan	
5	Win	5–0	Fumihiro Karikomi	KO	3 (4) 2:10	2003-09-26	Korakuen Hall, Tokyo, Japan	
4	Win	4–0	Hironari Miyahara	KO	2 (4) 1:38	2003-07-29	Korakuen Hall, Tokyo, Japan	
3	Win	3–0	Hiroya Kawashima	TKO	1 (4) 0:50	2003-06-13	Korakuen Hall, Tokyo, Japan	
2	Win	2–0	Kenshi Kinoshita	UD	4	2003-04-17	Korakuen Hall, Tokyo, Japan	
1	Win	1–0	Kazumasa Watanabe	KO	1 (4) 2:08	2003-01-18	Korakuen Hall, Tokyo, Japan	pro debut

== Titles ==
- 60th East Japan Freshman Tournament Bantamweight winner (November 2, 2003)
- 32nd Japanese Super bantamweight champion (Defences: 4)
- 37th OPBF Super bantamweight champion (Defences: 1)
- 31st WBA World Super bantamweight champion (Defences: 0)

== Awards ==
- 2007 Fresh fighter Award (Japanese Boxing Commission / December 17, 2007)

== See also ==
- List of world super-bantamweight boxing champions
- List of Japanese boxing world champions
- Boxing in Japan

Sporting positions
Regional boxing titles
Preceded by Daisuke Yamanaka	Japanese super bantamweight champion April 9, 2007 – October 4, 2008	Succeeded by Kazuma Miura
World boxing titles
Preceded by Lee Ryol-li	WBA super bantamweight champion January 31, 2011 – July 9, 2011	Succeeded by Rico Ramos
