= Miguel Díaz (boxing) =

Argentine boxer (born 1938)

Miguel Angel Diaz (born 1938) is an Argentine boxing trainer who has trained fighters from Latin America and from the United States.

== Coaching career ==
Diaz was selected to receive the Futch–Condon Award for the 1999 Trainer of the Year by the Boxing Writers Association of America, and was inducted into the World Boxing Hall of Fame on November 15, 2008.

Diaz began boxing when he was eight years old, and experienced twenty-seven amateur outings, but had a very short career as a professional boxer, having only one fight and then retired from boxing as a fighter.

Diaz moved to Los Angeles, California, where he established the Miguel Diaz boxing gym. One of his first world champions was Pedro Decima. He also trained Erik Morales who knocked Daniel Zaragoza out in eleven rounds at El Paso, Texas for the WBC world Bantamweight championship. Diaz then began traveling between Los Angeles and Tijuana to help train Morales. Miguel Diaz also served as a cutman and co-trainer for Diego 'Chico' Corrales and Floyd 'Money' Mayweather, which led to a conflict when the two fighters faced each other. Diaz chose to work in Corrales' corner instead of staying with Mayweather, with whom he had a longer relationship. Mayweather remained professional but made it clear that he would not work with Diaz again if he made this choice. Diaz, confident in Corrales' victory and with a larger role and a bigger share of the fighter’s purse, opted to support Corrales. However, Mayweather dominated the fight and won. Following this decision, Diaz no longer worked with either Corrales or Mayweather, resulting in a significant loss of income, as Mayweather went on to become one of the highest-grossing fighters in boxing history.

He went on to help train Fernando Vargas for a number of fights and established a second Miguel Diaz boxing gym, located in Las Vegas, Nevada.

Diaz later resided part-time in Puerto Rico, where he helped train brothers Miguel Angel and José Miguel Cotto as well as Daniel Jimenez, among others. Miguel Cotto reached world championship status, winning the WBO Junior Welterweight crown and later was inducted into the International Boxing Hall of Fame. He also coached Marcos Maidana.
