= Alejandro Pérez (boxer) =

American boxer

Personal information
- Nickname: El Alacrán
- Born: Alejandro Pérez; May 3, 1986 (age 40) Salinas, California
- Height: 5 ft 7 in (172 cm)
- Weight: Super Featherweight; Featherweight

Boxing career
- Reach: 72 in (183 cm)
- Stance: Orthodox

Boxing record
- Total fights: 24
- Wins: 19
- Win by KO: 13
- Losses: 4
- Draws: 1
- No contests: 0

Alejandro Pérez (born May 3, 1986) is an American professional boxer in the Super Featherweight division.

== Pro career ==
On March 25, 2011 Alejandro Pérez upset title contender Antonio Escalante, the bout was televised on TeleFutura.
