= Eddie Townsend =

American boxing trainer (1914–1988)

Edward "Eddie" Townsend
- Born: October 5, 1914; Honolulu, Territory of Hawaii
- Died: February 1, 1988 (aged 73); Osaka, Japan
- Years active: 1962–1988
- Known for: Boxing trainer in Japan

Edward "Eddie" Townsend (October 5, 1914 – February 1, 1988) was an American professional boxing trainer.

He is revered in Japan for training several boxing world champions. An award given to boxing trainers was established in his honor and a boxing gym in Osaka, bears his name.

== Biography ==
Townsend was born to a Japanese mother and an American father in Honolulu, Territory of Hawaii. His mother lived in Yamaguchi Prefecture, before immigrating to the United States and his father worked as a lawyer.

He began boxing at age 14 and was undefeated in 12 fights as a professional, before losing his 13th bout the day before the Japanese attack on Pearl Harbor (December 6, 1941). Townsend's American friends quickly deserted him after learning that he was half Japanese and Townsend decided to end his professional career to become a trainer.

Townsend first traveled to Japan in 1962 at the invitation of Japanese professional wrestler Rikidōzan, who wanted Townsend to teach boxing at the Rikigym. However, this did not last for long, as Rikidōzan was fatally stabbed in December, 1963. Coincidentally, the stabbing took place on the anniversary day of the attack on Pearl Harbor.

Shortly after Rikidōzan's death, Townsend was reunited with third-generation Japanese American boxer, Takeshi Fuji, who had been friends with Townsend in Honolulu. He became Fuji's trainer and his name first became known in the Japanese boxing world when Fuji became world champion in 1967. Townsend went on to single-handedly train a total of six world champions, along with numerous other regional title-holders. Both his skill as a trainer and his amicable personality made him the most respected trainer in Japanese boxing.

Townsend's final trainee was Hiroki Ioka, who captured the WBC minimumweight title on October 18, 1987. By this time, Townsend was suffering from cancer and had to look on from a wheelchair as Ioka trained for his first title defense. Townsend was determined to see Ioka make his first defense, and entered the arena with Ioka on a hospital bed. However, his condition seriously worsened before the start of the match and had to be rushed back to the hospital immediately. He died shortly after hearing that Ioka had won by 12th-round TKO.

== Legacy ==
Townsend remains one of the most famous trainers in Japanese boxing history, and the Eddie Townsend Award was established in his honor in 1990. The award is given each year to the trainer that has contributed the most to Japanese boxing.

The Eddie Townsend Gym was founded in Osaka, and a memorial statue was erected in Shirahama, Wakayama, which was said to be Townsend's favorite place to visit in Japan.

A play titled EDDIE was written in his honor, and is often performed in Japanese schools.

== World champions trained by Eddie Townsend ==
- Takeshi Fuji
- Hiroyuki Ebihara
- Kuniaki Shibata
- Guts Ishimatsu
- Tadashi Tomori
- Hiroki Ioka
