= Steve Hearon =

American boxer and convicted murderer

Personal information
- Nationality: United States
- Born: John Davis Jr. 1953 (age 72–73)
- Weight: Welterweight

Boxing career

Boxing record
- Total fights: 28
- Wins: 24
- Win by KO: 18
- Losses: 4

John Davis Jr. (born 1953) who boxed professionally under the ring name Steve Hearon, is an American former professional boxer and convicted murderer. While Davis (as Hearon) never fought for a world title, he held several significant wins as a boxer, including one over future WBC world Junior Welterweight champion, Bruce Curry.

== Criminal record ==
Davis was convicted of the 1976 murder of 48 year old William Brownell, a man whose body was found battered in his Wilshire district (Los Angeles) apartment.

In 1977, according to police investigations, Davis was also involved in an armed robbery, for which he was convicted. He was also convicted, in 1988, of second degree robbery.

Davis was also convicted for the murder of 48 year old Claude Hill.

Over the years, some evidence has surfaced suggesting that all three of Davis' victims were homosexual men. Davis was sent to a jail in Colorado, from where he escaped to begin a career as a boxer.

== Professional boxing career ==
Davis, as Hearon, began his professional boxing career on Tuesday, November 13, 1979, at the Sam Houston Coliseum in Houston, Texas, when he took on Ronnie Ford, an opponent who had 1 win and 2 losses in 3 previous boxing contests. Davis won by six rounds unanimous decision.

Davis ran his record to 12 wins without a loss before losing in his thirteenth contest, nine of those wins by knockout. Most of those victories came against mediocre opposition, the possible exception being a 8-1 prospect named Greg Young, beaten by Davis by first-round knockout at the Sheraton Twin Towers hotel in Orlando, Florida as the main event of a program held on April 18, 1981.

For his next contest, Davis met the 11 wins, 2 losses Armando Ramirez of Los Angeles at the Blaisdell Center Arena in Honolulu, Hawaii. In an action-packed contest, Davis dropped Ramirez but was dropped himself twice and lost by ten-rounds unanimous decision on April 30, 1981.

Now 12–1 after thirteen fights, Davis fought future WBC world Welterweight champion Milton McCrory, 13-0 himself, on June 25, 1981, at the Astrodome in Houston, as part of a program that included a major world-titles double-header featuring Thomas Hearns versus Pablo Baez for Hearns' WBA's world Welterweight championship and Ayub Kalule versus Sugar Ray Leonard for Kalule's WBA world Junior Middleweight championship. McCrory beat Davis by an eighth-round technical knockout.

On his next contest, Davis achieved what is considered his best win as a professional, when he faced future WBC world Junior Welterweight champion, the 24 wins, 6 losses Texan Bruce Curry at the Billy Bob's Texas' Dallas location on August 4, 1981. Davis beat the future world champion by a seventh-round technical knockout. After this win, Davis (as Hearon) was ranked among the top ten in the Junior-Welterweights division by the WBC.

Three further wins against non-notable opponents followed, after which Davis was matched with Ernesto Herrera, who at 22 wins, 11 losses and 3 draws (ties) was mostly remembered for having unsuccessfully challenged Eusebio Pedroza for Pedroza's WBA world Featherweight championship. Herrera had also faced Arturo Leon, Frankie Baltazar, Gonzalo Montellano, James "Bubba" Busceme, and Edwin "Chapo" Rosario in his career; Herrera would later meet others such as Jose Luis Ramirez, Julio Cesar Chavez and Sammy Ayala, losing to each of them. On January 28, 1982, at the Shamrock Hilton Hotel in Houston, Davis beat Herrera by a third-round knockout.

After a victory over a fighter named Anthony Collins, Davis fought Sal Lopez. Lopez was a hard-hitting, 23 wins and 2 losses prospect who had faced, among others, Pete Ranzany. Davis handled Lopez by a second-round knockout on April 13, 1982, at the Memorial Auditorium in Sacramento, California. A win over former Aaron Pryor WBA world Junior Welterweight championship challenger Lennox Blackmoore followed, Davis winning a close, 10-rounds split decision at the Astro Arena in Houston, on June 21, 1982.

By now, Davis (as Steve Hearon) was ranked number one by the WBC at the Junior Welterweight division. A fight for the WBC world Junior Welterweight championship against Saoul Mamby loomed ahead. But Mamby lost his title to Leroy Haley, who in turn lost it to Davis' former ring-victim Bruce Curry. A rematch between Curry and Davis (Hearon) was now near taking place.

But, after four wins over mostly obscure opposition, he faced a future world champion in Lupe Aquino, as part of a program featuring a main event with Larry Holmes, the WBC world Heavyweight champion, defending his title against challenger Scott Frank. Aquino sported a record of 21 wins and 1 loss into this fight, and he beat Davis when he landed a punch which opened, on Davis, a cut which bled too profusely for Davis to continue, being defeated by a fifth-round technical knockout on September 10, 1983, at Atlantic City, New Jersey.

Still ranked number 1 by the WBC, and being considered their mandatory challenger to world champion Curry despite the loss to Aquino, Davis faced the 2 wins, 3 losses Eduardo Dominguez in what was supposed to be a confidence-rebuilding match for Davis, as part of an undercard which was held at the Caesars Palace hotel in Las Vegas, Nevada on November 25, 1983, and which included a fight by Aquino himself and meetings between Ray Mancini and Johnny Torres and Larry Holmes and Marvis Frazier. Dominguez, however, caused an upset when he landed a punch that re-opened the cut Davis had suffered in his previous match against Aquino and had the fight awarded to him (Dominguez) by a second-round technical knockout. Due mainly to legal reasons, this turned out to be Davis' last professional fight as a boxer.

Considered by experts, fans and rivals alike as a hard-punching prospect, Davis had a record of 24 wins and 4 losses as a professional boxer, with 18 wins and 3 losses by knockout.

== Later on ==
Davis was later recognized by an FBI agent after spotting him, and he was sent back to jail. In 2004, his problems with the law continued when he was convicted of aggravated assault; that latter conviction was ratified during 2006. He is currently serving a 24 years sentence for the latter crime.

== See also ==
- Reggie Gross
- Clifford Etienne
- Rubin Carter
