= Bruce Curry =

American boxer (born 1956)

Personal information
- Born: March 29, 1956 (age 70) Marlin, Texas, U.S.
- Height: 5 ft 9.5 in (176 cm)
- Weight: Light welterweight

Boxing career
- Reach: 67 in (170 cm)
- Stance: Orthodox

Boxing record
- Total fights: 41
- Wins: 33
- Win by KO: 17
- Losses: 8

Bruce Curry (born March 29, 1956, in Marlin, Texas), is an American former professional boxer. He was the WBC Super Lightweight Champion from 1983 to 1984.

== Family ==
Curry is the oldest of three brothers, all of whom were boxers. His younger brother is Donald Curry, who won four belts in the welterweight category (WBC, WBA, IBF and The Ring), one in the light middleweight category (WBC), and was inducted into the International Boxing Hall of Fame).

== Amateur career ==
Curry was a two-time Texas Golden Gloves Champion and runner-up to Sugar Ray Leonard at the 1976 U.S. Olympic Boxing Trials. Curry reportedly had an amateur record of 315-11. During his amateur career he was trained by Wesley Gale Parker.

== Professional career ==
Curry turned professional in 1976 and won his first fourteen professional fights. On November 18, 1977, he fought Wilfred Benítez, the former WBA Junior Welterweight Champion. Curry knocked Benitez down three times but lost by a controversial ten-round split decision due to the scoring system.

He signed to fight Minoru Sugiya in Japan on January 26, 1978. He was then offered a rematch with Benitez, which would take place a mere 11 days later, on February 4. He decided to go take both fights. He knocked out Sugiya in three rounds and then flew back to the U.S. for the Benitez fight, which Benitez won by a ten-round majority decision. Benitez trained harder for the rematch and Curry was travel-worn. "I just wanted to get it done and go to bed," Curry said. "I should have sent out for coffee."

Curry won his next two fights and then lost back-to-back fights, getting stopped in nine rounds by Domingo Ayala and losing to Adolfo Viruet by a ten-round decision. Curry put together three straight wins and then fought Thomas Hearns, who was 19-0 with 18 knockouts. The 6' 1" Hearns stopped Curry in three rounds, however, the fight is best remembered in boxing circles as a rare but true example of "going down swinging," with Curry punching valiantly even as he fell to the canvas.

He won eleven of his next thirteen fights and then got his first world title shot. On May 18, 1983, Curry beat Leroy Haley by a twelve-round unanimous decision to win the WBC Super Lightweight Championship. Curry's younger brother, Donald, won the WBA Welterweight Championship several months earlier. They were the first pair of brothers to hold world titles simultaneously. Another Curry brother, Graylin, was also a professional boxer.

Curry made two successful title defenses, knocking out Hidekazu Akai in seven rounds and winning a rematch with Haley by a twelve-round split decision. On January 29, 1984, Curry lost the title by a tenth-round knockout to Billy Costello.

On February 2, 1984, Curry was arrested in Las Vegas, Nevada, after he fired several shots at his trainer, Jesse Reid, following an altercation at a gym. He had fought with Reid after blaming him for his loss to Costello. Curry was charged with assault with a deadly weapon and carrying a concealed weapon.

Curry was found innocent by reason of insanity and ordered confined to a mental hospital until he was no longer a threat to society. He was released on March 26, 1985, after a team of three psychiatrists said he was no longer mentally ill.

Curry fought just one more time, defeating Tomas Garcia by a ten-round decision on April 29, 1986. He finished with a record of 35-8 with 17 knockouts.

== Professional boxing record ==
41 fights	33 wins	8 losses
By knockout	17	5
By decision	16	3

No.	Result	Record	Opponent	Type	Round, time	Date	Location	Notes
41	Win	33–8	Tomas Negro Garcia	MD	8 (8)	1986-04-29	Casa de Amistad, Harlingen, Texas, U.S.	
40	Loss	32–8	Billy Costello	TKO	10 (12)	1984-01-29	Civic Center, Beaumont, Texas, U.S.	Lost WBC super lightweight title
39	Win	32–7	Leroy Haley	SD	12 (12)	1983-10-19	Showboat Hotel & Casino, Sports Pavilion, Las Vegas, Nevada, U.S.	Retained WBC super lightweight title
38	Win	31–7	Hidekazu Akai	TKO	7 (12)	1983-07-07	Kinki University Auditorium, Osaka, Japan	Retained WBC super lightweight title
37	Win	30–7	Leroy Haley	UD	12 (12)	1983-05-18	Dunes Hotel & Casino, Outdoor Arena, Las Vegas, Nevada, U.S.	Won WBC super lightweight title
36	Win	29–7	Tyrone Rackley	TKO	1 (10)	1983-03-19	Reno-Sparks Convention Center, Reno, Nevada, U.S.	
35	Win	28–7	Ronnie Shields	UD	12 (12)	1982-11-17	Civic Arena, Saint Joseph, Missouri, U.S.	Won USBA super lightweight title
34	Win	27–7	Danny Favella	KO	8 (10)	1982-03-25	Showboat Hotel and Casino, Sports Pavilion, Las Vegas, Nevada, U.S.	
33	Win	26–7	Edward Nuno	UD	10 (10)	1982-01-26	Showboat Hotel and Casino, Sports Pavilion, Las Vegas, Nevada, U.S.	
32	Win	25–7	Mark Ibanez	UD	10 (10)	1981-12-01	Blaisdell Center Arena, Honolulu, Hawaii, U.S.	
31	Loss	24–7	Steve Hearon	TKO	7 (12)	1981-08-04	Billy Bob's Texas, Fort Worth, Fort Worth, Texas, U.S.	
30	Win	24–6	Pablo Gomez	TKO	4 (10)	1981-06-02	Billy Bob's Texas, Fort Worth, Fort Worth, Texas, U.S.	
29	Win	23–6	Alejo Rodriguez	PTS	10 (10)	1981-01-15	Will Rogers Coliseum, Fort Worth, Texas, U.S.	
28	Win	22–6	Andres Ramirez	TKO	3 (10)	1980-09-25	Caesars Palace, Sports Pavilion, Las Vegas, Nevada, U.S.	
27	Loss	21–6	Greg Stephens	KO	11 (12)	1980-06-03	Aladdin, Las Vegas, Nevada, U.S.	Lost NABF super lightweight title
26	Win	21–5	Jimmy Jackson	KO	7 (10)	1980-01-18	Sahara, Las Vegas, Nevada, U.S.	
25	Win	20–5	Greg Stephens	UD	10 (10)	1979-09-25	Sahara, Las Vegas, Nevada, U.S.	
24	Loss	19–5	Thomas Hearns	KO	3 (10)	1979-06-28	Olympia Stadium, Detroit, Michigan, U.S.	
23	Win	19–4	Willie Rodriguez	KO	10 (12)	1979-04-14	Superdome, New Orleans, Louisiana, U.S.	Retained NABF super lightweight title
22	Win	18–4	Clinton McKenzie	UD	10 (10)	1979-02-24	Caesars Palace, Las Vegas, Nevada, U.S.	Retained USBA super welterweight title
21	Win	17–4	Wade Hinnant	SD	10 (10)	1978-12-05	Spectrum, Philadelphia, Pennsylvania, U.S.	
20	Loss	16–4	Adolfo Viruet	UD	10 (10)	1978-10-27	Madison Square Garden, New York City, New York, U.S.	
19	Loss	16–3	Domingo Ayala	TKO	9 (?)	1978-09-09	Hiram Bithorn Stadium, San Juan, Puerto Rico	
18	Win	16–2	Monroe Brooks	TKO	9 (12)	1978-04-07	Olympic Auditorium, Los Angeles, California, U.S.	Won NABF super lightweight title
17	Win	15–2	Luis Resto	TKO	2 (10)	1978-03-18	Aladdin, Las Vegas, Nevada, U.S.	
16	Loss	14–2	Wilfred Benítez	MD	10 (10)	1978-02-04	Madison Square Garden, New York City, New York, U.S.	
15	Win	14–1	Minoru Sugiya	TKO	3 (10)	1978-01-26	Japan	
14	Loss	13–1	Wilfred Benítez	SD	10 (10)	1977-11-18	Madison Square Garden, New York City, New York, U.S.	
13	Win	13–0	Julio Gomez	KO	3 (10)	1977-10-19	Stockton Memorial Civic Auditorium, Stockton, California, U.S.	
12	Win	12–0	Lion Furuyama	TKO	5 (10)	1977-07-17	Korakuen Hall, Tokyo, Japan	
11	Win	11–0	Rudy Barro	TKO	8 (10)	1977-05-25	Stockton, California, U.S.	
10	Win	10–0	Juan Antonio Merlo	UD	8 (8)	1977-05-21	Stade Louis II, Fontvieille, Monaco	
9	Win	9–0	Buffalo Suzuki	KO	7 (10)	1977-05-15	Japan	
8	Win	8–0	Rafael Rodriguez	SD	11 (10)	1977-04-15	Dickinson High School, Jersey City, New Jersey, U.S.	Fighters fought sudden death round, and the fight featured open scoring.
7	Win	7–0	Jimmy Jackson	UD	10 (10)	1977-04-04	Sahara, Las Vegas, Nevada, U.S.	
6	Win	6–0	Freddie Washington	UD	8 (8)	1977-02-21	Sahara, Las Vegas, Nevada, U.S.	
5	Win	5–0	Clarence Howard	TKO	3 (8)	1976-11-10	Silver Slipper, Las Vegas, Nevada, U.S.	
4	Win	4–0	Chris Gonzalez	TKO	1 (5)	1976-11-04	Olympic Auditorium, Los Angeles, California, U.S.	
3	Win	3–0	Jorge Morales	UD	6 (6)	1976-10-27	Silver Slipper, Las Vegas, Nevada, U.S.	
2	Win	2–0	Willie Hearne	KO	1 (?)	1976-10-05	Circle Star Theater, San Carlos, California, U.S.	
1	Win	1–0	Bruce Henderson	PTS	5 (5)	1976-09-09	Olympic Auditorium, Los Angeles, California, U.S.	

== See also ==
- Notable boxing families
- List of world light-welterweight boxing champions

Sporting positions
Regional boxing titles
Preceded by Monroe Brooks	NABF super lightweight champion April 7, 1978 – 1978; Vacated	Vacant Title next held by Willie Rodriguez
Preceded by Willie Rodriguez	NABF super lightweight champion April 14, 1979 – 1979; Vacated	Vacant Title next held by Nick Furlano
World boxing titles
Preceded by Leroy Haley	WBC super lightweight champion May 18, 1983 – January 29, 1984	Succeeded by Billy Costello
