= Alexis Argüello vs. Billy Costello =

Boxing match

A Gentlemen's Disagreement
- Date: February 9, 1986
- Venue: Lawlor Events Center, Reno, Nevada, U.S.

Tale of the tape
Boxer	Alexis Argüello	Billy Costello
Nickname	El Flaco Explosivo ("The Explosive Thin Man")	
Hometown	Managua, Nicaragua	Kingston, New York, U.S.
Purse	$200,000	$80,000
Pre-fight record	75–7 (61 KO)	31–1 (17 KO)
Age	33 years, 9 months	29 years, 9 months
Height	5 ft 10 in (178 cm)	5 ft 8 1/2 in (174 cm)
Weight	143 lb (65 kg)	144 lb (65 kg)
Style	Orthodox	Orthodox
Recognition	3-division world champion	The Ring; No. 3 Ranked Light Welterweight; Former WBC super lightweight champion

Result
- Argüello wins via 4th-round technical knockout

Alexis Argüello vs. Billy Costello, billed as A Gentlemen's Disagreement, was a professional boxing match contested on February 9, 1986.

== Background ==
Three-division boxing champion Alexis Argüello had tearfully announced his retirement following a second loss to Aaron Pryor in September 1983. However, in July 1985, Argüello returned to a boxing training camp based in New Hampshire with hopes of making a comeback. Though he had not made an official decision yet Argüello mentioned to the New York Times that he felt like "a million bucks". One month later, Argüello would officially announce his return to boxing. Argüello who reportedly owed the IRS $70,000 in debt, denied he was making a comeback due to his financial problems instead claiming that he was returning to the sport because he "didn't want to get old knowing I could have done it." Argüello and his manager Bill Miller both revealed hopes to face then-WBC super lightweight champion Billy Costello, but Costello would drop the title just ten days later in an upset loss to Lonnie Smith Costello would announce his retirement immediately after the loss, but ended it after only six days, claiming he "couldn't go out a loser" and vowing to "win his title back."

In late August, Argüello officially returned to boxing after winning a six-round exhibition bout in Lowell, Massachusetts against local fighter Manuel Madera. Following this, Argüello's first professional fight was announced to take place in Anchorage, Alaska against undefeated prospect Andy Nance on October 5, though it was later postponed until October 25, and Nance was replaced by Pat Jefferson after Nance suffered a cut while training. Argüello would win his comeback fight in dominating fashion, knocking out Jefferson in the fifth round after sending him down two other times in the same round. On December 13, 1985, Costello would win his comeback fight against Rick Kiaser via second-round knockout.

This would lead to Argüello and Costello being matched up against each other on February 9, 1986, at the Lawlor Events Center in Reno, Nevada in what was super lightweight title eliminator bout, though both fighters fought slightly above the super lightweight limit of 140 pounds. Argüello was installed as a 2–1 favorite by oddsmakers.

== Fight Details ==
Argüello got off to a very poor start as Costello controlled the first three rounds, effectively counterpunching and landing jabs and body shots at will. Costello entered the fourth round having won every round on each of the official judge's scorecards, however, one minute into the round, Costello missed a big right hand that Argüello countered with a big right of his own that caught Costello flush and sent him crashing down to the mat. Costello would answer referee Mills Lane's 10-count and continue the fight, but was clearly dazed from the blow as Argüello rushed in with a frenzied combination while Costello was on the ropes. Costello attempted to fight back but could not defend himself against Argüello's onslaught, causing Lane to step in and stop the fight at 1:42 of the round.

== Fight card ==
Confirmed bouts:

Weight Class	Weight		vs.		Method	Round
Welterweight	147 lbs.	Alexis Argüello	def.	Billy Costello	TKO	4/10
Super Lightweight	140 lbs.	Laurie Mann	def.	Dennis Mulholland	MD	10
Lightweight	135 lbs.	Vinnie Costello	def.	Caesar Alanis	TKO	4/10
Super Lightweight	140 lbs.	Jesse Lopez	def.	Gerardo Venzor	KO	3/8
Bantamweight	118 lbs.	George Evans	def.	Alberto R Pereyra	TKO	3/6
Welterweight	147 lbs.	John Shepherd	def.	Bobby Sinibaldi	KO	3/6
Heavyweight	200+ lbs.	Bob Dietlemeier	def.	Paul Bradshaw	TKO	3/4

== Broadcasting ==
Country	Broadcaster
United States	CBS

Preceded by vs. Pat Jefferson	Alexis Argüello's bouts 9 February 1986	Succeeded by vs. Jorge Palomares
Preceded by vs. Rick Kaiser	Billy Costello's bouts 9 February 1986	Succeeded by vs. Marvin Ladson
