= Ricky Young =

American boxer (born 1960)

- Born: July 7, 1960 (age 66); Savannah, Georgia, U.S.
- Years active: 1983–1986
- Website: www.ricksalist.com

Ricky Young (born 1960) is an American former professional super lightweight boxer from New York City, who had 21 fights with 6 KO's and 17 wins.

== Early life ==
Born in July 1960 in Savannah, Georgia, U.S., Ricky Young spent most of his early life in a housing project in Harlem. After graduating high school, Young lived with his parents and two younger sisters while working as a carpenter's assistant. Young's father worked as a bookkeeper and his mother worked as a trimmer in a clothing factory.

== Career ==
Young started his career after deciding to start going to the gym to get in shape. Young quickly started to discover his talent for boxing and began to nurture it. Ricky Young says he was influenced by the success of Sugar Ray Robinson and Muhammad Ali, and used this inspiration to fuel his discipline to train on a daily basis.

Ricky's trainer was Bobby McQuillar, an American former professional lightweight boxer, who had 44 fights with 17 KO's and 38 wins. McQuillar is known for beating three men who went on to hold world titles, Joe Brown, Jimmy Carter and Sandy Saddler. McQuillar trained Young at Gleason's Gymnasium on West 30th Street and 8th Avenue.

Some of Young's notable fights included a 1986 fight against Buddy McGirt at Madison Square Garden with Mike Tyson on undercard. Young also retired Leroy Haley in 1985 at the Madison Square Garden Felt Forum where Mike Tyson was undercard and co-featured by Iran Barkley. Young also fought Angel Cruz in 1985 at the Madison Square Garden Felt Forum for USA NYS Super Lightweight Title with Iran Barkley on undercard.

After his boxing career, Ricky went on to run the boxing program at Columbia University from 1996 - 2007.

== Professional boxing record ==
17 Wins (6 knockouts 11 decisions), 4 Losses
Result	Record	Opponent	Type	Date	Location
Loss	17-4	Vincent Releford	UD	1986-12-26	Trump Plaza Hotel, Atlantic City
Win	17-3	David Taylor	UD	1986-09-25	Felt Forum, New York
Loss	16-3	James McGirt	TKO	1986-05-20	Madison Square Garden, New York
Win	15-2	Leroy Haley	PTS	1985-12-06	Felt Forum, New York
Loss	15-2	Angel Cruz	UD	1985-11-01	Felt Forum, New York
Win	15-1	David Taylor	UD	1985-09-19	Felt Forum, New York
Win	14-1	Vilomar Fernandez	SD	1985-06-28	Felt Forum, New York
Win	13-1	Nelson Ortiz	MD	1985-04-12	Felt Forum, New York
Win	12-1	Freddie Pendleton	SD	1985-01-19	Felt Forum, New York
Win	11-1	Bryant Ware	PTS	1984-11-14	Felt Forum, New York
Loss	10-1	Angel Cruz	UD	1984-08-23	Felt Forum, New York
Win	10-0	Cumba Valentine	KO	1984-08-09	Felt Forum, New York
Win	9-0	Norberto Velez	PTS	1984-06-29	Felt Forum, New York
Win	8-0	Rodney Moore	TKO	1984-05-25	Felt Forum, New York
Win	7-0	Edgar Rodriguez	KO	1984-04-13	Felt Forum, New York
Win	6-0	James Singleton	KO	1984-03-12	Felt Forum, New York
Win	5-0	Tony Baldwin	KO	1984-02-17	Felt Forum, New York
Win	4-0	Emmett Decker	PTS	1984-01-20	Felt Forum, New York
Win	3-0	Greg Brooks	PTS	1983-12-02	Ridgewood Grove, Queens
Win	2-0	Terry Young	KO	1983-07-29	Brooklyn
Win	1-0	D J Turner	KO	1983-05-27	Felt Forum, New York
