= Jesse Reid (boxing trainer) =

American boxer

Personal information
- Nationality: (United States) American

Boxing career

Jesse Reid is a boxer and Hall of Fame trainer. His former students include world champions Roger Mayweather, Lamon Brewster, Johnny Tapia, Orlando Canizales, Reggie Johnson and Bruce Curry. He has trained 23 World Champions and developed over 40 world-rated boxers.

== Fighters trained ==
Among the boxers and/or boxing world champions who have trained under Jesse Reid at some point in their career are:

- Craig "Pressure" Parker
- Oscar Albarado
- Vincent Boulware
- Lamon Brewster
- Jesse Burnett
- Hector Camacho
- Gaby Canizales
- Orlando Canizales
- Bruce Curry
- Tye Fields
- Rodolfo Gonzalez
- Roger Mayweather
- Craig Parker
- John Ricker
- Malik Scott
- Paul Spadafora
- Johnny Tapia
- Frank Tate
