= Kim Sang-hyun (boxer) =

South Korean boxer

Personal information
- Nationality: (South Korea) South Korean
- Born: January 18, 1955 (age 71) Busan, South Korea
- Height: 5 ft 9 in (1.75 m)
- Weight: Light Welterweight

Boxing career
- Stance: Southpaw

Boxing record
- Total fights: 49
- Wins: 42
- Win by KO: 25
- Losses: 4
- Draws: 3
- No contests: 0

- Kim Sang-hyun
- Hangul: 김상현
- Hanja: 金相賢
- RR: Gim Sanghyeon
- MR: Kim Sanghyŏn

Kim Sang-hyun (Korean: 김상현; Hanja: 金相賢; born January 18, 1955, in Busan, South Korea) is a former boxer from South Korea.

== Career ==
Kim won the Orient and Pacific Boxing Federation light welterweight title in 1978 and became the WBC light welterweight champion with a technical KO win over Saensak Muangsurin, who set a world record by winning the world title in only his 3rd professional fight. He defended the belt twice before losing it to Saoul Mamby in 1980. In 1981, Kim defeated Thomas Americo to regain the OPBF regional belt. In 1983, Kim unsuccessfully challenged Aaron Pryor for the WBA light welterweight title, losing by TKO at 0:37 of round 3. He retired after the bout.

Preceded by Saensak Muangsurin	WBC Light Welterweight Champion; 30 December 1978 – 23 February 1980	Succeeded by Saoul Mamby
