= Billy Costello (boxer) =

American boxer

Personal information
- Born: William Donald Castiglioni; April 10, 1956 Kingston, New York, U.S.
- Died: June 29, 2011 (aged 55) Kingston, New York, U.S.
- Height: 5 ft 8 1/2 in (174 cm)
- Weight: Light welterweight

Boxing career
- Reach: 71 in (180 cm)
- Stance: Orthodox

Boxing record
- Total fights: 42
- Wins: 40
- Win by KO: 23
- Losses: 2

Billy Costello (born William Donald Castiglioni; April 10, 1956 – June 29, 2011) was a professional boxer in the United States.

== Early life ==
Costello was born in Kingston, New York, on April 10, 1956, to a Sicilian father and a mother of Native American, Italian and African American descent, as one of nine children. Costello was active in the Boy Scouts. He played third base on the Kingston High School baseball team and had originally hoped for a career as a professional baseball player.

== Amateur career ==
Billy Costello won the 1978 135 pound New York Golden Gloves Open Championship. Costello stopped Raymond Johnson of the United Block Association in the second round to win the Championship. Costello began boxing in the Police Athletic League program in Kingston, and later trained at the Castle Hill Athletic Club in the Bronx, New York.

== Professional career ==
During his career, he was managed by Mike Jones, who was also famous for managing Gerry Cooney and Wilford Scypion. Costello fought a lot of his early professional bouts around the Hudson Valley-NYC area, after a successful amateur career that culminated in a Golden Gloves award. The Kew Gardens section of Queens, New York eventually became his home, at least while he was champion. But before winning a title, he put together an early undefeated streak, which included a 10-round decision over Willie Rodriguez on CBS television in November 1982. He and his management then became closely associated with the CBS network, which aired several of his fights.

The one and only title he held in his career, the WBC junior welterweight title, was won by knocking out Bruce Curry in the 10th round in January 1984 in front of a pro-Curry crowd in Beaumont, Texas. He would then make three defenses of the belt, all in Kingston, and all by 12-round unanimous decision. His first foe as champion was Ronnie Shields, with whom he traded first-round knockdowns before eventually securing the points win. Next was former WBC 140-lb. champion and veteran Saoul Mamby, who replaced Leroy Haley, another former possessor of Costello's belt, on five days notice. Costello defeated ex-champion Mamby by unanimous decision.

His next fight was finally against Leroy Haley. The result was a unanimous win over 12 rounds for Costello. Next, a Denver, Colorado fighter named Lonnie 'Lightning' Smith defeated him, knocking down and cutting the defending champion en route to an eighth-round stoppage in New York City to claim the title in August 1985. Smith recovered from a first-round knockdown himself and dropped Costello five times before the fight was over.

Billy kept coming back, next fighting three-time champion Alexis Argüello in February 1986. Arguello, behind on points, stopped Costello in Round 4 after knocking him down. Costello then took some time off from the ring, fighting on a sporadic 'here-and-there' basis until the early 1990s. In his last bout in 1999, he defeated former world champion Juan Laporte by ten round decision in a Pay Per View fight, avenging a 1986 loss to LaPorte by his brother Vinnie. All in all, Costello's professional career had lasted an astounding 20 years, from 1979 to 1999, and ended with a win over a former world champion. His respectable career had only two losses, both to world champions.

Costello is perhaps best remembered for his stoppage loss to Alexis Arguello.

== Professional boxing record ==
42 fights	40 wins	2 losses
By knockout	23	2
By decision	17	0

No.	Result	Record	Opponent	Type	Round, time	Date	Location	Notes
42	Win	40–2	Juan Laporte	SD	10 (10)	1999-06-18	Crown Coliseum, Fayetteville, North Carolina, U.S.	
41	Win	39–2	Marvin Ladson	TKO	3 (10)	1997-01-22	The Ritz, Raleigh, North Carolina, U.S.	
40	Win	38–2	Tim Scott	UD	10 (10)	1995-05-31	Civic Center, Raleigh, North Carolina, U.S.	
39	Win	37–2	Jeff Passero	TKO	10 (10)	1995-04-28	Music Fair, Westbury, New York, U.S.	
38	Win	36–2	Bobby Elkins	KO	6 (10)	1994-09-13	Music Fair, Westbury, New York, U.S.	
37	Win	35–2	Robert Hightower	PTS	10 (10)	1994-01-28	Kingston, New York, U.S.	
36	Win	34–2	Bernard Boisvert	TKO	6 (10)	1993-11-11	Huntington Hilton Hotel, Melville, New York, U.S.	
35	Win	33–2	Juan Carlos Romero	UD	8 (8)	1993-06-18	Holiday Inn Crowne Plaza, White Plains, New York, U.S.	
34	Win	32–2	Marvin Ladson	TKO	4 (10)	1992-06-27	Mahi Temple Shrine Auditorium, Miami, Florida, U.S.	
33	Loss	31–2	Alexis Argüello	TKO	4 (10)	1986-02-09	Lawlor Events Center, Reno, Nevada, U.S.	
32	Win	31–1	Rick Kaiser	KO	2 (10)	1985-12-13	Midtown Neighborhood Center, Kingston, New York, U.S.	
31	Loss	30–1	Lonnie Smith	TKO	8 (12)	1985-08-21	Madison Square Garden, New York City, New York, U.S.	Lost WBC super lightweight title
30	Win	30–0	Leroy Haley	UD	12 (12)	1985-02-16	Midtown Neighborhood Center, Kingston, New York, U.S.	Retained WBC super lightweight title
29	Win	29–0	Saoul Mamby	UD	12 (12)	1984-11-03	Midtown Neighborhood Center, Kingston, New York, U.S.	Retained WBC super lightweight title
28	Win	28–0	Ronnie Shields	UD	12 (12)	1984-07-15	Municipal Auditorium, Kingston, New York, U.S.	Retained WBC super lightweight title
27	Win	27–0	Bruce Curry	TKO	10 (12)	1984-01-29	Civic Center, Beaumont, Texas, U.S.	Won WBC super lightweight title
26	Win	26–0	Mike Essett	KO	4 (10)	1983-12-21	War Memorial Auditorium, Syracuse, New York, U.S.	
25	Win	25–0	Clemente Rojas	TKO	5 (10)	1983-09-30	Kingston, New York, U.S.	
24	Win	24–0	Carl Crowley	TKO	3 (10)	1983-04-16	Municipal Auditorium, Kingston, New York, U.S.	
23	Win	23–0	Willie Rodriguez	UD	10 (10)	1982-11-07	Municipal Auditorium, Kingston, New York, U.S.	
22	Win	22–0	Dominic Fox	KO	2 (10)	1982-10-08	Municipal Auditorium, Kingston, New York, U.S.	
21	Win	21–0	Felix Favella	TKO	3 (10)	1982-05-23	Caesars Palace Sports Pavilion, Paradise, Nevada, U.S.	
20	Win	20–0	Bob Harvey	SD	10 (10)	1982-04-14	Westchester County Center, White Plains, New York, U.S.	
19	Win	19–0	Raul Hernandez	TKO	6 (8)	1982-02-17	Westchester County Center, White Plains, New York, U.S.	
18	Win	18–0	Chico Rosa	TKO	1 (8)	1981-12-05	Playboy Hotel & Casino, Atlantic City, New Jersey, U.S.	
17	Win	17–0	Rosendo Ramirez	UD	8 (8)	1981-07-18	Imperial Palace, Paradise, Nevada, U.S.	
16	Win	16–0	Trevor Evelyn	TKO	5 (10)	1981-04-24	Westchester County Center, White Plains, New York, U.S.	
15	Win	15–0	Marvin Jenkins	UD	10 (10)	1981-03-18	Westchester County Center, White Plains, New York, U.S.	
14	Win	14–0	Charles Thomas	KO	2 (?)	1981-01-21	Westchester County Center, White Plains, New York, U.S.	
13	Win	13–0	Orlando Montalvo	UD	8 (8)	1980-10-24	Nassau Coliseum, Uniondale, New York, U.S.	
12	Win	12–0	Jose Green	TKO	7 (8)	1980-10-02	Long Island Arena, Commack, New York, U.S.	
11	Win	11–0	Paul Moore	KO	1 (?)	1980-09-17	Westchester County Center, White Plains, New York, U.S.	
10	Win	10–0	Rick Stinnie	PTS	6 (6)	1980-05-14	Westchester County Center, White Plains, New York, U.S.	
9	Win	9–0	Richie Garland	TKO	5 (6)	1980-05-04	Concord Resort Hotel, Kiamesha Lake, New York, U.S.	
8	Win	8–0	Kato Ali	TKO	3 (6)	1980-04-16	Westchester County Center, White Plains, New York, U.S.	
7	Win	7–0	Kato Ali	SD	6 (6)	1980-02-13	Westchester County Center, White Plains, New York, U.S.	
6	Win	6–0	Marvin Edwards	TKO	1 (6)	1979-12-05	Westchester County Center, White Plains, New York, U.S.	
5	Win	5–0	George Casher	PTS	4 (4)	1979-10-26	Madison Square Garden, New York City, New York, U.S.	
4	Win	4–0	John Jones	TKO	2 (4)	1979-10-19	Long Island Arena, Commack, New York, U.S.	
3	Win	3–0	Dave Bolden	PTS	4 (4)	1979-10-12	Nassau Coliseum, Uniondale, New York, U.S.	
2	Win	2–0	Jose Gonzalez	KO	3 (4)	1979-09-12	Westchester County Center, White Plains, New York, U.S.	
1	Win	1–0	Angel Ortiz	UD	4 (4)	1979-08-22	Felt Forum, New York City, New York, U.S.	

== Life After Boxing ==
In retirement, Costello worked as a home contractor, active in building and road construction. Costello also served as the volunteer director of the Kingston PAL Boxing Club in Kingston, New York. On evenings and weekends, Costello remained active in pro boxing as a professional boxing judge and referee in New York State at many sanctioned events. There is a Billy Costello Boxing Gym in Kingston, and Costello was involved in boxing shows in the area.

== Book ==
Billy Costello's championship run was the subject of Thomas Hauser's "The Black Lights: Inside the World of Professional Boxing." One of the most widely heralded books ever written on boxing, Hauser appeared in the Costello training camp during last minute negotiations for a televised bout with substitute challenger Saoul Mamby, was given access to the contractual negotiations, and painted a literary portrait of the inside wheels of boxing as it affected Costello.

== Personal life ==
Costello lived most of his life in Kingston, New York. He also lived in Kew Gardens (Queens), New York during much of his reign as champion. He then retired from boxing & moved to New Paltz, New York, a small village in Ulster County, New York near Costello's hometown of Kingston, New York. Costello eventually settled back in his hometown of Kingston, New York where he lived until his death. He was married and divorced, and had a son and a daughter, who survive him. He was close with his younger brother Mario 'Vinnie' Costello, a noted professional super featherweight boxer from 1981 to 1990 with a pro record of 20-2-2 but who never fought for a title, who trained with his brother under the late Victor Vallee, who also trained Gerry Cooney.

== Death ==
According to his mother, Dolores, Costello died of lung cancer at a hospital in his native Kingston on June 29, 2011. He was 55. He was survived by: his parents, Dolores and Billy Costello Sr.; a daughter, Christine Costello, and a son, Brandon, from his marriage to his wife, Jane, which ended in divorce; four living brothers, Stephen, Mario 'Vinnie' Costello, Anthony, and Glenn; and two sisters, Vicky Costello and Tammy Moody.

== See also ==
- List of world light-welterweight boxing champions

Sporting positions
World boxing titles
Preceded by Bruce Curry	WBC super lightweight champion January 29, 1984 – August 21, 1985	Succeeded by Lonnie Smith
