= List of WBC world champions =

This is a list of WBC world champions, showing every world champion certificated by the World Boxing Council (WBC). The WBC is one of the four major governing bodies in professional boxing, and certifies world champions in 18 different weight classes. In 1963, the year of its foundation, the WBC inaugurated titles in all divisions with the exception of light flyweight, super flyweight, super bantamweight, super middleweight, cruiserweight and bridgerweight, which were inaugurated in the subsequent decades. The most recent title inaugurated by the WBC is in the bridgerweight division in 2021.

Boxers who won the title but were stripped due to the title bout being overturned to a no contest are not listed.

| Current champion |
| Most consecutive title defenses |

== Heavyweight ==
| No. | Name | Reign | Defenses |
|---|---|---|---|
| 1 | Sonny Liston (def. Floyd Patterson) | 22 Jul 1963 – 25 Feb 1964 | 0 |
| 2 | Muhammad Ali | 25 Feb 1964 – 6 Mar 1969 | 9 |
Ali was stripped of the title due to being suspended for refusing to be inducted in the U.S. Army.
| 3 | Joe Frazier (def. Jimmy Ellis) | 16 Feb 1970 – 22 Jan 1973 | 4 |
| 4 | George Foreman | 22 Jan 1973 – 30 Oct 1974 | 2 |
| 5 | Muhammad Ali (2) | 30 Oct 1974 – 15 Feb 1978 | 10 |
| 6 | Leon Spinks | 15 Feb – 18 Mar 1978 | 0 |
Spinks was stripped of the title for pursuing a rematch against Muhammad Ali instead of a bout against mandatory challenger Ken Norton.
| 7 | Ken Norton (no. 1 contender promoted) | 18 Mar – 9 Jun 1978 | 0 |
| 8 | Larry Holmes | 9 Jun 1978 – 11 Dec 1983 | 16 |
Holmes vacated the title after a dispute with his promoter Don King over the proposed purse for a fight against mandatory challenger Greg Page.
| 9 | Tim Witherspoon (def. Greg Page) | 9 Mar – 31 Aug 1984 | 0 |
| 10 | Pinklon Thomas | 31 Aug 1984 – 22 Mar 1986 | 1 |
| 11 | Trevor Berbick | 22 Mar – 22 Nov 1986 | 0 |
| 12 | Mike Tyson | 22 Nov 1986 – 11 Feb 1990 | 9 |
| 13 | Buster Douglas | 11 Feb – 25 Oct 1990 | 0 |
| 14 | Evander Holyfield | 25 Oct 1990 – 13 Nov 1992 | 2 |
| 15 | Riddick Bowe | 13 Nov – 14 Dec 1992 | 0 |
Bowe vacated the title instead of fighting mandatory challenger Lennox Lewis, then dumped his WBC belt in a trash bin during a news conference in London.
| 16 | Lennox Lewis (no. 1 contender promoted) | 14 Dec 1992 – 24 Sep 1994 | 3 |
| 17 | Oliver McCall | 24 Sep 1994 – 2 Sep 1995 | 1 |
| 18 | Frank Bruno | 2 Sep 1995 – 16 Mar 1996 | 0 |
| 19 | Mike Tyson (2) | 16 Mar – 24 Sep 1996 | 0 |
Tyson vacated the title to pursue a bout against Evander Holyfield instead of mandatory challenger Lennox Lewis.
| 20 | Lennox Lewis (2) (def. Oliver McCall) | 7 Feb 1997 – 22 Apr 2001 | 9 |
| 21 | Hasim Rahman | 22 Apr – 17 Nov 2001 | 0 |
| 22 | Lennox Lewis (3) | 17 Nov 2001 – 6 Feb 2004 | 2 |
Lewis retired as champion and chose not to rematch Vitali Klitschko ahead of a WBC-mandated 1 March deadline to accept the bout.
| 23 | Vitali Klitschko (def. Corrie Sanders) | 24 Apr 2004 – 9 Nov 2005 | 1 |
Klitschko announced his retirement after withdrawing from a bout against Hasim Rahman due to injuries.
| 24 | Hasim Rahman (2) (interim champion promoted) | 9 Nov 2005 – 12 Aug 2006 | 1 |
| 25 | Oleg Maskaev | 12 Aug 2006 – 8 Mar 2008 | 1 |
| 26 | Samuel Peter | 8 Mar – 11 Oct 2008 | 0 |
| 27 | Vitali Klitschko (2) | 11 Oct 2008 – 16 Dec 2013 | 9 |
Klitschko vacated the title to focus on his career in politics in Ukraine.
| 28 | Bermane Stiverne (def. Chris Arreola) | 10 May 2014 – 17 Jan 2015 | 0 |
| 29 | Deontay Wilder | 17 Jan 2015 – 22 Feb 2020 | 10 |
| 30 | Tyson Fury | 22 Feb 2020 – 18 May 2024 | 3 |
| 31 | Oleksandr Usyk | 18 May 2024 – 26 Jun 2026 | 3 |
Usyk vacated the title.
| 32 | Agit Kabayel (interim champion promoted) | 27 Jun 2026 – present | 0 |

== Bridgerweight ==
| No. | Name | Reign | Defenses |
|---|---|---|---|
| 1 | Óscar Rivas (def. Ryan Rozicki) | 22 Oct 2021 – 6 Jan 2023 | 0 |
Rivas is declared champion in recess after suffering an injury.
| 2 | Łukasz Różański (def. Alen Babić) | 22 Apr 2023 – 24 May 2024 | 0 |
| 3 | Lawrence Okolie | 24 May – 8 Oct 2024 | 0 |
Okolie vacated the title to move up to heavyweight.
| 4 | Kevin Lerena (interim champion promoted) | 8 Oct 2024 – 30 May 2026 | 1 |
| 5 | Ryad Merhy | 30 May 2026 – Present | 0 |

== Cruiserweight ==
| No. | Name | Reign | Defenses |
|---|---|---|---|
| 1 | Marvin Camel (def. Mate Parlov) | 31 Mar – 25 Nov 1980 | 0 |
| 2 | Carlos de León | 25 Nov 1980 – 27 Jun 1982 | 1 |
| 3 | S. T. Gordon | 27 Jun 1982 – 17 Jul 1983 | 1 |
| 4 | Carlos de León (2) | 17 Jul 1983 – 6 Jun 1985 | 3 |
| 5 | Alfonso Ratliff | 6 Jun – 21 Sep 1985 | 0 |
| 6 | Bernard Benton | 21 Sep 1985 – 22 Mar 1986 | 0 |
| 7 | Carlos de León (3) | 22 Mar 1986 – 9 Apr 1988 | 3 |
| 8 | Evander Holyfield | 9 Apr – Dec 1988 | 0 |
Holyfield vacated to move up to heavyweight full time.
| 9 | Carlos de León (4) (def. Sammy Reeson) | 17 May 1989 – 27 Jul 1990 | 1 |
| 10 | Massimiliano Duran | 27 Jul 1990 – 20 Jul 1991 | 1 |
| 11 | Anaclet Wamba | 20 Jul 1991 – 19 April 1996 | 7 |
Wamba is stripped of the title for being overweight before his fight against Marcelo Domínguez.
| 12 | Marcelo Domínguez (interim champion promoted) | 25 May 1996 – 21 Feb 1998 | 3 |
| 13 | Juan Carlos Gómez | 21 Feb 1998 – 19 Feb 2002 | 10 |
Gómez vacated the title to move up to heavyweight.
| 14 | Wayne Braithwaite (def. Vincenzo Cantatore) | 11 Oct 2002 – 2 Apr 2005 | 3 |
| 15 | Jean-Marc Mormeck | 2 Apr 2005 – 7 Jan 2006 | 0 |
| 16 | O'Neil Bell | 7 Jan 2006 – 17 Mar 2007 | 0 |
| 17 | Jean-Marc Mormeck (2) | 17 Mar – 10 Nov 2007 | 0 |
| 18 | David Haye | 10 Nov 2007 – 12 May 2008 | 1 |
Haye vacated the title to move up to heavyweight.
| 19 | Giacobbe Fragomeni (def. Rudolf Kraj) | 24 Oct 2008 – 21 Nov 2009 | 1 |
| 20 | Zsolt Erdei | 21 Nov 2009 – 22 Jan 2010 | 0 |
Erdei vacates the title to move back down to light heavyweight.
| 21 | Krzysztof Włodarczyk (def. Giacobbe Fragomeni) | 15 May 2010 – 27 Sep 2014 | 6 |
| 22 | Grigory Drozd | 27 Sep 2014 – 16 Mar 2016 | 1 |
Drozd is declared champion in recess due to injury.
| 23 | Tony Bellew (def. Ilunga Makabu) | 29 May 2016 – 28 Mar 2017 | 1 |
Bellew was stripped of the title and named Emeritus champion after moving up to heavyweight.
| 24 | Mairis Briedis (def. Marco Huck) | 1 Apr 2017 – 27 Jan 2018 | 1 |
| 25 | Oleksandr Usyk | 27 Jan 2018 – 4 Jun 2019 | 2 |
Usyk was stripped of the title and named champion in recess after moving up to heavyweight.
| 26 | Ilunga Makabu (def. Michał Cieślak) | 31 Jan 2020 – 26 Feb 2023 | 2 |
| 27 | Badou Jack | 26 Feb – 16 Sep 2023 | 0 |
Jack is declared champion in recess after opting to challenge the WBC bridgerweight title.
| 28 | Noel Mikaelian (def. Ilunga Makabu) | 4 Nov 2023 – 11 Dec 2024 | 0 |
Mikaelian is declared champion in recess due to inactivity.
| 29 | Badou Jack (2) (reinstated) | 11 Dec 2024 – 13 Dec 2025 | 1 |
| 30 | Noel Mikaelian (2) | 13 Dec 2025 – 14 Sep 2026 | 0 |
Mikaelian is stripped of the title for failing to fight mandatory challenger David Benavidez.
| 31 | Michał Cieślak (interim champion promoted) | 14 Sep 2026 – present | 0 |

== Light heavyweight ==
| No. | Name | Reign | Defenses |
|---|---|---|---|
| 1 | Harold Johnson (awarded the inaugural title) | 14 Feb – 1 Jun 1963 | 0 |
| 2 | Willie Pastrano | 1 Jun 1963 – 30 Mar 1965 | 2 |
| 3 | José Torres | 30 Mar 1965 – 16 Dec 1966 | 3 |
| 4 | Dick Tiger | 16 Dec 1966 – 24 May 1968 | 2 |
| 5 | Bob Foster | 24 May 1968 – 9 Aug 1974 | 14 |
Foster was stripped of the title after failing to make a defense against number one contender John Conteh.
| 6 | John Conteh (def. Jorge Ahumada) | 1 Oct 1974 – 18 May 1977 | 3 |
Conteh was stripped of the title after refusing to fight Jesse Burnett, alleging he was forced to sign the contract at gunpoint.
| 7 | Miguel Ángel Cuello (def. Jesse Burnett) | 21 May 1977 – 8 Jan 1978 | 0 |
| 8 | Mate Parlov | 8 Jan – 2 Dec 1978 | 1 |
| 9 | Marvin Johnson | 2 Dec 1978 – 22 Apr 1979 | 0 |
| 10 | Matthew Saad Muhammad | 22 Apr 1979 – 19 Dec 1981 | 8 |
| 11 | Dwight Muhammad Qawi | 19 Dec 1981 – 18 Mar 1983 | 3 |
| 12 | Michael Spinks | 18 Mar 1983 – 9 Oct 1985 | 4 |
Spinks, who had won the IBF heavyweight title the previous month against Larry Holmes, was stripped of the WBC light heavyweight title due to the WBC's policy against fighters holding world titles in multiple divisions at the same time.
| 13 | J. B. Williamson (def. Prince Mama Mohammed) | 10 Dec 1985 – 30 Apr 1986 | 0 |
| 14 | Dennis Andries | 30 Apr 1986 – 7 Mar 1987 | 1 |
| 15 | Thomas Hearns | 7 Mar – 6 Aug 1987 | 0 |
Hearns vacated the title to fight Juan Roldán for the vacant WBC middleweight title.
| 16 | Donny Lalonde (def. Eddie Davis) | 27 Nov 1987 – 7 Nov 1988 | 1 |
| 17 | Sugar Ray Leonard | 7 Nov – 15 Nov 1988 | 0 |
Leonard vacated the title because he was unsure whether he would continue his boxing career.
| 18 | Dennis Andries (2) (def. Tony Willis) | 21 Feb – 24 Jun 1989 | 0 |
| 19 | Jeff Harding | 24 Jun 1989 – 28 Jul 1990 | 2 |
| 20 | Dennis Andries (3) | 28 Jul 1990 – 11 Sep 1991 | 2 |
| 21 | Jeff Harding (2) | 11 Sep 1991 – 23 Jul 1994 | 2 |
| 22 | Mike McCallum | 23 Jul 1994 – 16 Jun 1995 | 1 |
| 23 | Fabrice Tiozzo | 16 Jun 1995 – 13 Jan 1997 | 1 |
Tiozzo is stripped of the title after failing to meet the defense deadline.
| 24 | Roy Jones Jr. (interim champion promoted) | 13 Jan – 21 Mar 1997 | 0 |
| 25 | Montell Griffin | 21 Mar – 7 Aug 1997 | 0 |
| 26 | Roy Jones Jr. (2) | 7 Aug – 5 Nov 1997 | 0 |
Jones vacated the title after his mandatory challenger Michael Nunn's promoter won a purse bid with the intent to stage it as a pay-per-view fight on Request TV, a rival platform to HBO, which Jones was contractually tied to.
| 27 | Graciano Rocchigiani (def. Michael Nunn) | 21 Mar – Jun 1998 | 0 |
Rocchigiani was demoted to interim champion upon Roy Jones Jr.'s request to be reinstated as champion.
| 28 | Roy Jones Jr. (3) (reinstated) | Jun 1998 – 4 Apr 2003 | 11 |
In June 1998, the WBC stripped Rocchigiani of the title and reinstated Jones Jr. without having to fight him. Rocchigiani then filed a lawsuit and won the case. The federal judge issued a decree to strip Jones Jr. and award Rocchigiani a total amount of $30,598,628 in damages.
| 29 | Antonio Tarver (def. Montell Griffin) | 26 Apr – 8 Nov 2003 | 0 |
| 30 | Roy Jones Jr. (4) | 8 Nov 2003 – 15 May 2004 | 0 |
| 31 | Antonio Tarver (2) | 15 May – 4 Nov 2004 | 0 |
Tarver vacates the title to fight Glen Johnson instead of his mandatory challenger Paul Briggs.
| 32 | Tomasz Adamek (def. Paul Briggs) | 21 May 2005 – 3 Feb 2007 | 2 |
| 33 | Chad Dawson | 3 Feb 2007 – 11 Jul 2008 | 3 |
Dawson vacated the title to pursue a bout against Antonio Tarver instead of interim champion Adrian Diaconu.
| 34 | Adrian Diaconu (interim champion promoted) | 11 Jul 2008 – 19 Jun 2009 | 0 |
| 35 | Jean Pascal | 19 Jun 2009 – 21 May 2011 | 2 |
| 36 | Bernard Hopkins | 21 May 2011 – 28 Apr 2012 | 0 |
| 37 | Chad Dawson (2) | 28 Apr 2012 – 8 Jun 2013 | 0 |
| 38 | Adonis Stevenson | 8 Jun 2013 – 1 Dec 2018 | 9 |
| 39 | Oleksandr Gvozdyk | 1 Dec 2018 – 18 Oct 2019 | 1 |
| 40 | Artur Beterbiev | 18 Oct 2019 – 22 Feb 2025 | 6 |
| 41 | Dmitry Bivol | 22 Feb – 7 Apr 2025 | 0 |
Bivol vacated the title to pursue a trilogy against Artur Beterbiev instead of fighting interim champion David Benavidez.
| 42 | David Benavidez (interim champion promoted) | 7 Apr 2025 – 9 Oct 2026 | 1 |
Benavidez vacated the title stay at cruiserweight.
| 43 | Willy Hutchinson (def. Joshua Buatsi) | 7 Nov 2026 – present | 0 |

== Super middleweight ==
| No. | Name | Reign | Defenses |
|---|---|---|---|
| 1 | Sugar Ray Leonard (def. Donny Lalonde) | 7 Nov 1988 – 27 Aug 1990 | 2 |
Leonard vacates the title citing that he is underweight for the division.
| 2 | Mauro Galvano (def. Dario Matteoni) | 15 Dec 1990 – 3 Oct 1992 | 2 |
| 3 | Nigel Benn | 3 Oct 1992 – 2 Mar 1996 | 9 |
| 4 | Thulani Malinga | 2 Mar – 6 Jul 1996 | 0 |
| 5 | Vincenzo Nardiello | 6 Jul – 12 Oct 1996 | 0 |
| 6 | Robin Reid | 12 Oct 1996 – 19 Dec 1997 | 3 |
| 7 | Thulani Malinga (2) | 19 Dec 1997 – 27 Mar 1998 | 0 |
| 8 | Richie Woodhall | 27 Mar 1998 – 23 Oct 1999 | 2 |
| 9 | Markus Beyer | 23 Oct 1999 – 6 May 2000 | 1 |
| 10 | Glenn Catley | 6 May – 1 Sep 2000 | 0 |
| 11 | Dingaan Thobela | 1 Sep – 15 Dec 2000 | 0 |
| 12 | Dave Hilton Jr. | 15 Dec 2000 – 1 May 2001 | 0 |
Hilton was stripped of the title after being convicted of sexually assaulting two teenaged girls.
| 13 | Éric Lucas (def. Glenn Catley) | 10 Jul 2001 – 5 Apr 2003 | 3 |
| 14 | Markus Beyer (2) | 5 Apr 2003 – 5 Jun 2004 | 2 |
| 15 | Cristian Sanavia | 5 Jun – 9 Oct 2004 | 0 |
| 16 | Markus Beyer (3) | 9 Oct 2004 – 14 Oct 2006 | 5 |
| 17 | Mikkel Kessler | 14 Oct 2006 – 3 Nov 2007 | 1 |
| 18 | Joe Calzaghe | 3 Nov 2007 – 28 Jun 2008 | 0 |
Calzaghe vacated the title to pursue a fight with Roy Jones Jr. instead of mandatory challenger Carl Froch.
| 19 | Carl Froch (def. Jean Pascal) | 6 Dec 2008 – 24 Apr 2010 | 2 |
| 20 | Mikkel Kessler (2) | 24 Apr – 6 Sep 2010 | 0 |
Kessler, who withdrew from the Super Six World Boxing Classic due to an eye injury, was stripped of the title and is designated by the WBC as Champion Emeritus.
| 21 | Carl Froch (2) (def. Arthur Abraham) | 27 Nov 2010 – 17 Dec 2011 | 1 |
| 22 | Andre Ward | 17 Dec 2011 – 11 Apr 2013 | 1 |
Ward is stripped of the title and is designated by the WBC as Champion Emeritus unbeknownst to him.
| 23 | Sakio Bika (def. Marco Antonio Peribán) | 22 Jun 2013 – 16 Aug 2014 | 1 |
| 24 | Anthony Dirrell | 16 Aug 2014 – 24 Apr 2015 | 0 |
| 25 | Badou Jack | 24 Apr 2015 – 18 Jan 2017 | 3 |
Jack vacated the title to move up to light heavyweight.
| 26 | David Benavidez (def. Ronald Gavril) | 8 Sep 2017 – 3 Oct 2018 | 1 |
Benavidez was stripped of the title after testing positive for cocaine and was named champion in recess.
| 27 | Anthony Dirrell (2) (def. Avni Yildirim) | 23 Feb – 28 Sep 2019 | 0 |
| 28 | David Benavidez (2) | 28 Sep 2019 – 14 Aug 2020 | 0 |
Benavidez was stripped of the title after failing to make weight for his fight against Roamer Alexis Angulo.
| 29 | Canelo Álvarez (def. Callum Smith) | 19 Dec 2020 – 13 Sep 2025 | 9 |
| 30 | Terence Crawford | 13 Sep – 3 Dec 2025 | 0 |
Crawford was stripped of the title for failing to pay the sanctioning fees. On 27 January 2026, interim champion M'billi was promoted to world champion.
| 31 | Christian M'billi (interim champion promoted) | 27 Jan – 31 Oct 2026 | 0 |
| 32 | Canelo Álvarez (2) | 31 Oct 2026 – present | 0 |

== Middleweight ==
| No. | Name | Reign | Defenses |
|---|---|---|---|
| 1 | Dick Tiger (def. Gene Fullmer) | 10 Aug – 7 Dec 1963 | 0 |
| 2 | Joey Giardello | 7 Dec 1963 – 21 Oct 1965 | 1 |
| 3 | Dick Tiger (2) | 21 Oct 1965 – 25 Apr 1966 | 0 |
| 4 | Emile Griffith | 25 Apr 1966 – 4 Mar 1968 | 2 |
| 5 | Nino Benvenuti | 4 Mar 1968 – 7 Nov 1970 | 4 |
| 6 | Carlos Monzón | 7 Nov 1970 – 23 Apr 1974 | 9 |
Monzón is stripped of his title for not fighting his mandatory challenger Rodrigo Valdéz.
| 7 | Rodrigo Valdéz (def. Bennie Briscoe) | 25 May 1974 – 26 Jun 1976 | 4 |
| 8 | Carlos Monzón (2) | 26 Jun 1976 – 29 Aug 1977 | 1 |
Monzón retires.
| 9 | Rodrigo Valdéz (2) (def. Bennie Briscoe) | 5 Nov 1977 – 22 Apr 1978 | 0 |
| 10 | Hugo Corro | 22 Apr 1978 – 30 Jun 1979 | 2 |
| 11 | Vito Antuofermo | 30 Jun 1979 – 16 Mar 1980 | 1 |
| 12 | Alan Minter | 16 Mar – 27 Sep 1980 | 1 |
| 13 | Marvin Hagler | 27 Sep 1980 – 6 Apr 1987 | 12 |
| 14 | Sugar Ray Leonard | 6 Apr – 27 May 1987 | 0 |
Leonard retires.
| 15 | Thomas Hearns (def. Juan Roldán) | 29 Oct 1987 – 6 Jun 1988 | 0 |
| 16 | Iran Barkley | 6 Jun 1988 – 24 Feb 1989 | 0 |
| 17 | Roberto Durán | 24 Feb 1989 – 11 Jan 1990 | 0 |
Durán is stripped of the title for not defending the title within the required 10 months.
| 18 | Julian Jackson (def. Herol Graham) | 24 Nov 1990 – 8 May 1993 | 4 |
| 19 | Gerald McClellan | 8 May 1993 – 5 Jan 1995 | 3 |
McClellan vacates his title to move up and challenge Nigel Benn for his WBC super middleweight title.
| 20 | Julian Jackson (2) (def. Agostino Cardamone) | 17 Mar – 19 Aug 1995 | 0 |
| 21 | Quincy Taylor | 19 Aug 1995 – 16 Mar 1996 | 0 |
| 22 | Keith Holmes | 16 Mar 1996 – 2 May 1998 | 2 |
| 23 | Hacine Cherifi | 2 May 1998 – 24 Apr 1999 | 0 |
| 24 | Keith Holmes (2) | 24 Apr 1999 – 14 Apr 2001 | 2 |
| 25 | Bernard Hopkins | 14 Apr 2001 – 16 Jul 2005 | 7 |
| 26 | Jermain Taylor | 16 Jul 2005 – 29 Sep 2007 | 4 |
| 27 | Kelly Pavlik | 29 Sep 2007 – 17 Apr 2010 | 3 |
| 28 | Sergio Martínez | 17 Apr 2010 – 18 Jan 2011 | 1 |
Martínez is stripped for not fighting his mandatory challenger Sebastian Zbik.
| 29 | Sebastian Zbik (interim champion promoted) | 18 Jan – 4 Jun 2011 | 0 |
| 30 | Julio César Chávez Jr. | 4 Jun 2011 – 15 Sep 2012 | 3 |
| 31 | Sergio Martínez (2) | 15 Sep 2012 – 7 Jun 2014 | 1 |
| 32 | Miguel Cotto | 7 Jun 2014 – 17 Nov 2015 | 1 |
Cotto is stripped of his title for not abiding WBC's rules and regulations. Some sources tell that it was because he refused to pay the sanctioning fee.
| 33 | Canelo Álvarez (def. Miguel Cotto) | 21 Nov 2015 – 18 May 2016 | 1 |
Álvarez vacated his title to avoid WBC's deadline on the ongoing negotiation with Gennady Golovkin.
| 34 | Gennady Golovkin (interim champion promoted) | 18 May 2016 – 15 Sep 2018 | 4 |
| 35 | Canelo Álvarez (2) | 15 Sep 2018 – 26 Jun 2019 | 1 |
Álvarez is designated by the WBC as Franchise champion.
| 36 | Jermall Charlo (interim champion promoted) | 26 Jun 2019 – 7 May 2024 | 4 |
Charlo is stripped of the title.
| 37 | Carlos Adames (interim champion promoted) | 7 May 2024 – present | 3 |

== Super welterweight ==
| No. | Name | Reign | Defenses |
|---|---|---|---|
| 1 | Denny Moyer (def. Stan Harrington) | 19 Feb – 29 Apr 1963 | 0 |
| 2 | Ralph Dupas | 29 Apr – 7 Sep 1963 | 1 |
| 3 | Sandro Mazzinghi | 7 Sep 1963 – 18 Jun 1965 | 3 |
| 4 | Nino Benvenuti | 18 Jun 1965 – 25 Jun 1966 | 1 |
| 5 | Kim Ki-Soo | 25 Jun 1966 – 26 May 1968 | 2 |
| 6 | Sandro Mazzinghi (2) | 26 May – 8 Nov 1968 | 1 |
Mazzinghi is stripped of his title by the WBC after his bout against Freddie Little resulted in a no contest.
| 7 | Freddie Little (def. Stanley Hayward) | 17 Mar 1969 – 9 Jul 1970 | 2 |
| 8 | Carmelo Bossi | 9 Jul 1970 – 31 Oct 1971 | 1 |
| 9 | Koichi Wajima | 31 Oct 1971 – 4 Jun 1974 | 6 |
| 10 | Oscar Albarado | 4 Jun 1974 – 21 Jan 1975 | 1 |
| 11 | Koichi Wajima (2) | 21 Jan – 6 Mar 1975 | 0 |
Wajima is stripped of his title on WBC's February ratings posted on 6 March for choosing to fight Yuh Jae-doo who was not ranked by the WBC.
| 12 | Miguel de Oliveira (def. José Durán) | 7 May – 13 Nov 1975 | 0 |
| 13 | Elisha Obed | 13 Nov 1975 – 18 Jun 1976 | 2 |
| 14 | Eckhard Dagge | 18 Jun 1976 – 6 Aug 1977 | 2 |
| 15 | Rocky Mattioli | 6 Aug 1977 – 4 Mar 1979 | 2 |
| 16 | Maurice Hope | 4 Mar 1979 – 23 May 1981 | 3 |
| 17 | Wilfred Benítez | 23 May 1981 – 3 Dec 1982 | 2 |
| 18 | Thomas Hearns | 3 Dec 1982 – 24 Oct 1986 | 4 |
Hearns vacates his title to move up in weight class.
| 19 | Duane Thomas (def. John Mugabi) | 5 Dec 1986 – 12 Jul 1987 | 0 |
| 20 | Lupe Aquino | 12 Jul – 2 Oct 1987 | 0 |
| 21 | Gianfranco Rosi | 2 Oct 1987 – 8 Jul 1988 | 1 |
| 22 | Donald Curry | 8 Jul 1988 – 11 Feb 1989 | 0 |
| 23 | René Jacquot | 11 Feb – 8 Jul 1989 | 0 |
| 24 | John Mugabi | 8 Jul 1989 – 31 Mar 1990 | 0 |
| 25 | Terry Norris | 31 Mar 1990 – 18 Dec 1993 | 10 |
| 26 | Simon Brown | 18 Dec 1993 – 7 May 1994 | 1 |
| 27 | Terry Norris (2) | 7 May – 12 Nov 1994 | 0 |
| 28 | Luis Santana | 12 Nov 1994 – 19 Aug 1995 | 1 |
| 29 | Terry Norris (3) | 19 Aug 1995 – 6 Dec 1997 | 6 |
| 30 | Keith Mullings | 6 Dec 1997 – 29 Jan 1999 | 1 |
| 31 | Javier Castillejo | 29 Jan 1999 – 28 Jun 2001 | 5 |
| 32 | Oscar De La Hoya | 28 Jun 2001 – 13 Sep 2003 | 2 |
| 33 | Shane Mosley | 13 Sep 2003 – 13 Mar 2004 | 0 |
| 34 | Winky Wright | 13 Mar 2004 – 5 Mar 2005 | 1 |
Wright vacates the title to move up to middleweight.
| 35 | Javier Castillejo (2) (interim champion promoted) | 5 Mar – 31 May 2005 | 0 |
Castillejo was stripped of the title for refusing to fight his mandatory challenger Ricardo Mayorga.
| 36 | Ricardo Mayorga (def. Michele Piccirillo) | 13 Aug 2005 – 6 May 2006 | 0 |
| 37 | Oscar De La Hoya (2) | 6 May 2006 – 5 May 2007 | 0 |
| 38 | Floyd Mayweather Jr. | 5 May – 2 July 2007 | 0 |
Mayweather Jr. vacates the title to focus in the welterweight division.
| 39 | Vernon Forrest (def. Carlos Baldomir) | 28 Jul 2007 – 7 Jun 2008 | 1 |
| 40 | Sergio Mora | 7 Jun – 13 Sep 2008 | 0 |
| 41 | Vernon Forrest (2) | 13 Sep 2008 – 21 May 2009 | 0 |
Forrest is stripped of his title because of a rib injury that prevented him from defending his title.
| 42 | Sergio Martínez (interim champion promoted) | 21 May 2009 – 16 Jun 2010 | 0 |
Martínez vacates his title to stay at middleweight.
| 43 | Manny Pacquiao (def. Antonio Margarito) | 14 Nov 2010 – 8 Feb 2011 | 0 |
Pacquiao vacates his title to move back down to welterweight.
| 44 | Canelo Álvarez (def. Matthew Hatton) | 5 Mar 2011 – 14 Sep 2013 | 6 |
| 45 | Floyd Mayweather Jr. (2) | 14 Sep 2013 – 2 Nov 2015 | 1 |
Mayweather Jr. announced his retirement on 12 September 2015 but the title was officially vacated 2 months after. He was also designated by the WBC as Champion Emeritus.
| 46 | Jermell Charlo (def. John Jackson) | 21 May 2016 – 22 Dec 2018 | 3 |
| 47 | Tony Harrison | 22 Dec 2018 – 21 Dec 2019 | 0 |
| 48 | Jermell Charlo (2) | 21 Dec 2019 – 26 Jan 2024 | 3 |
Charlo is designated by the WBC as champion in recess.
| 49 | Sebastian Fundora (def. Tim Tszyu) | 30 Mar 2024 – present | 4 |

== Welterweight ==
| No. | Name | Reign | Defenses |
|---|---|---|---|
| 1 | Emile Griffith (awarded inaugural title) | Feb – 21 Mar 1963 | 0 |
| 2 | Luis Manuel Rodríguez | 21 Mar – 8 Jun 1963 | 0 |
| 3 | Emile Griffith (2) | 8 Jun 1963 – 1 Aug 1966 | 5 |
Griffith moves up and wins the WBA, WBC, and The Ring middleweight titles; He then loses the lawsuit to retain his WBC welterweight title.
| 4 | Curtis Cokes (def. Manuel Gonzalez) | 24 Aug 1966 – 18 Apr 1969 | 4 |
| 5 | José Nápoles | 18 Apr 1969 – 3 Dec 1970 | 3 |
| 6 | Billy Backus | 3 Dec 1970 – 4 Jun 1971 | 0 |
| 7 | José Nápoles (2) | 4 Jun 1971 – 6 Dec 1975 | 10 |
| 8 | John H. Stracey | 6 Dec 1975 – 22 Jun 1976 | 1 |
| 9 | Carlos Palomino | 22 Jun 1976 – 14 Jan 1979 | 7 |
| 10 | Wilfred Benítez | 14 Jan – 30 Nov 1979 | 1 |
| 11 | Sugar Ray Leonard | 30 Nov 1979 – 20 Jun 1980 | 1 |
| 12 | Roberto Durán | 20 Jun – 25 Nov 1980 | 0 |
| 13 | Sugar Ray Leonard (2) | 25 Nov 1980 – 9 Nov 1982 | 3 |
Leonard retires for the first time.
| 14 | Milton McCrory (def. Colin Jones) | 13 Aug 1983 – 6 Dec 1985 | 4 |
| 15 | Donald Curry | 6 Dec 1985 – 27 Sep 1986 | 0 |
| 16 | Lloyd Honeyghan | 27 Sep 1986 – 28 Oct 1987 | 3 |
| 17 | Jorge Vaca | 28 Oct 1987 – 29 Mar 1988 | 0 |
| 18 | Lloyd Honeyghan (2) | 29 Mar 1988 – 4 Feb 1989 | 1 |
| 19 | Marlon Starling | 4 Feb 1989 – 19 Aug 1990 | 1 |
| 20 | Maurice Blocker | 19 Aug 1990 – 18 Mar 1991 | 0 |
| 21 | Simon Brown | 18 Mar – 29 Nov 1991 | 0 |
| 22 | Buddy McGirt | 29 Nov 1991 – 6 Mar 1993 | 2 |
| 23 | Pernell Whitaker | 6 Mar 1993 – 12 Apr 1997 | 8 |
| 24 | Oscar De La Hoya | 12 Apr 1997 – 17 Sep 1999 | 7 |
| 25 | Félix Trinidad | 17 Sep 1999 – 20 Mar 2000 | 0 |
Trinidad vacates his title to stay at super welterweight.
| 26 | Oscar De La Hoya (2) (no. 1 contender promoted) | 20 Mar – 17 Jun 2000 | 0 |
| 27 | Shane Mosley | 17 Jun 2000 – 26 Jan 2002 | 3 |
| 28 | Vernon Forrest | 26 Jan 2002 – 25 Jan 2003 | 1 |
| 29 | Ricardo Mayorga | 25 Jan – 13 Dec 2003 | 1 |
| 30 | Cory Spinks | 13 Dec 2003 – 5 Feb 2005 | 2 |
| 31 | Zab Judah | 5 Feb 2005 – 7 Jan 2006 | 1 |
| 32 | Carlos Baldomir | 7 Jan – 4 Nov 2006 | 1 |
| 33 | Floyd Mayweather Jr. | 4 Nov 2006 – 6 Jun 2008 | 1 |
Mayweather Jr. announces his first retirement.
| 34 | Andre Berto (def. Miguel Ángel Rodríguez) | 21 Jun 2008 – 16 Apr 2011 | 5 |
| 35 | Victor Ortiz | 16 Apr – 17 Sep 2011 | 0 |
| 36 | Floyd Mayweather Jr. (2) | 17 Sep 2011 – 2 Nov 2015 | 5 |
Mayweather Jr. announced his retirement on 12 September 2015 but the title was officially vacated 2 months after. He was also designated by the WBC as Champion Emeritus.
| 37 | Danny Garcia (def. Robert Guerrero) | 23 Jan 2016 – 4 Mar 2017 | 0 |
| 38 | Keith Thurman | 4 Mar 2017 – 24 Apr 2018 | 0 |
Thurman vacates his title due to injuries.
| 39 | Shawn Porter (def. Danny Garcia) | 8 Sep 2018 – 28 Sep 2019 | 1 |
| 40 | Errol Spence Jr. | 28 Sep 2019 – 29 Jul 2023 | 2 |
| 41 | Terence Crawford | 29 Jul 2023 – 27 May 2024 | 0 |
Crawford becomes champion in recess after opting to move up to super welterweight.
| 42 | Mario Barrios (interim champion promoted) | 18 Jun 2024 – 21 Feb 2026 | 2 |
| 43 | Ryan Garcia | 21 Feb 2026 – present | 1 |

== Super lightweight ==
| No. | Name | Reign | Defenses |
|---|---|---|---|
| 1 | Eddie Perkins (def. Roberto Cruz) | 15 Jun 1963 – 18 Jan 1965 | 2 |
| 2 | Carlos Morocho Hernández | 18 Jan 1965 – 29 Apr 1966 | 2 |
| 3 | Sandro Lopopolo | 29 Apr 1966 – 30 Apr 1967 | 1 |
| 4 | Takeshi Fuji | 30 Apr 1967 – 14 Nov 1968 | 1 |
Fuji was stripped of the title for not fighting his mandatory challenger Pedro Adigue.
| 5 | Pedro Adigue (def. Adolph Pruitt) | 14 Dec 1968 – 31 Jan 1970 | 0 |
| 6 | Bruno Arcari | 31 Jan 1970 – 2 Sep 1974 | 9 |
Arcari vacated his title to move up to welterweight.
| 7 | Perico Fernandez (def. Lion Furuyama) | 21 Sep 1974 – 15 Jul 1975 | 1 |
| 8 | Saensak Muangsurin | 15 Jul 1975 – 30 Jun 1976 | 1 |
| 9 | Miguel Velasquez | 30 June – 29 Oct 1976 | 0 |
| 10 | Saensak Muangsurin (2) | 29 Oct 1976 – 30 Dec 1978 | 7 |
| 11 | Kim Sang-Hyun | 30 Dec 1978 – 23 Feb 1980 | 2 |
| 12 | Saoul Mamby | 23 Feb 1980 – 26 Jun 1982 | 5 |
| 13 | Leroy Haley | 26 Jun 1982 – 18 May 1983 | 2 |
| 14 | Bruce Curry | 18 May 1983 – 29 Jan 1984 | 2 |
| 15 | Billy Costello | 29 Jan 1984 – 21 Aug 1985 | 3 |
| 16 | Lonnie Smith | 21 Aug 1985 – 5 May 1986 | 0 |
| 17 | René Arredondo | 5 May – 24 Jul 1986 | 0 |
| 18 | Tsuyoshi Hamada | 24 Jul 1986 – 22 Jul 1987 | 1 |
| 19 | René Arredondo (2) | 22 Jul – 12 Nov 1987 | 0 |
| 20 | Roger Mayweather | 12 Nov 1987 – 13 May 1989 | 4 |
| 21 | Julio César Chávez | 13 May 1989 – 29 Jan 1994 | 12 |
| 22 | Frankie Randall | 29 Jan – 7 May 1994 | 0 |
| 23 | Julio César Chávez (2) | 7 May 1994 – 7 Jun 1996 | 4 |
| 24 | Oscar De La Hoya | 7 Jun 1996 – 17 Jun 1997 | 1 |
De La Hoya vacates the title to stay at welterweight. The title is vacated on WBC's May ratings posted on 17 June.
| 25 | Kostya Tszyu (def. Miguel Ángel González) | 21 Aug 1999 – 9 Oct 2003 | 7 |
Tszyu is stripped of the title and is designated by the WBC as Champion Emeritus.
| 26 | Arturo Gatti (def. Gianluca Branco) | 24 Jan 2004 – 25 Jun 2005 | 2 |
| 27 | Floyd Mayweather Jr. | 25 Jun 2005 – 23 Mar 2006 | 0 |
Mayweather Jr. vacates the title to stay at welterweight.
| 28 | Junior Witter (def. DeMarcus Corley) | 15 Sep 2006 – 10 May 2008 | 2 |
| 29 | Timothy Bradley | 10 May 2008 – 28 Apr 2009 | 2 |
Bradley is stripped of his title for refusing to fight his mandatory challenger Devon Alexander.
| 30 | Devon Alexander (def. Junior Witter) | 1 Aug 2009 – 20 Jan 2011 | 2 |
| 31 | Timothy Bradley (2) | 29 Jan – 29 Jul 2011 | 0 |
Bradley is declared champion in recess for not defending it within six months.
| 32 | Érik Morales (def. Pablo César Cano) | 17 Sep 2011 – 23 Mar 2012 | 0 |
Morales came in overweight and is stripped of the title before fighting Danny Garcia. Only Garcia was eligible to win the title.
| 33 | Danny Garcia (def. Érik Morales) | 24 Mar 2012 – 11 Jun 2015 | 5 |
García is stripped of the title for refusing to fight his mandatory challenger Viktor Postol.
| 34 | Viktor Postol (def. Lucas Matthysse) | 3 Oct 2015 – 23 Jul 2016 | 0 |
| 35 | Terence Crawford | 23 Jul 2016 – 13 Feb 2018 | 3 |
Crawford wanted to move up to welterweight. The title is vacated on WBC's February 2018 rankings.
| 36 | José Ramírez (def. Amir Imam) | 17 Mar 2018 – 22 May 2021 | 4 |
| 37 | Josh Taylor | 22 May 2021 – 1 Jul 2022 | 1 |
Taylor vacates the title.
| 38 | Regis Prograis (def. Jose Zepeda) | 26 Nov 2022 – 9 Dec 2023 | 1 |
| 39 | Devin Haney | 9 Dec 2023 – 24 Jun 2024 | 0 |
Haney is declared champion in recess.
| 40 | Alberto Puello (interim champion promoted) | 24 Jun 2024 – 12 Jul 2025 | 1 |
| 41 | Subriel Matías | 12 Jul 2025 – 10 Jan 2026 | 0 |
| 42 | Dalton Smith | 10 Jan 2026 – present | 1 |

== Lightweight ==
| No. | Name | Reign | Defenses |
|---|---|---|---|
| 1 | Carlos Ortiz (def. Douglas Vaillant) | 7 Apr 1963 – 10 Apr 1965 | 3 |
| 2 | Ismael Laguna | 10 Apr – 13 Nov 1965 | 0 |
| 3 | Carlos Ortiz (2) | 13 Nov 1965 – 25 Oct 1966 | 2 |
Ortiz was stripped of the title after the WBC accused the referee for his title defense against Sugar Ramos, of doing a long count.
| 4 | Carlos Ortiz (3) (def. Sugar Ramos) | 1 Jul 1967 – 29 Jun 1968 | 1 |
| 5 | Carlos Cruz | 29 Jun 1968 – 18 Feb 1969 | 1 |
| 6 | Mando Ramos | 18 Feb 1969 – 3 Mar 1970 | 1 |
| 7 | Ismael Laguna (2) | 3 Mar – 16 Sep 1970 | 1 |
Laguna is stripped of the title.
| 8 | Ken Buchanan (def. Rubén Navarro) | 12 Feb – 25 Jun 1971 | 0 |
Buchanan is stripped of the title for failing to defend his title against Pedro Carrasco.
| 9 | Pedro Carrasco (def. Mando Ramos) | 5 Nov 1971 – 18 Feb 1972 | 0 |
| 10 | Mando Ramos (2) | 18 Feb – 15 Sep 1972 | 1 |
| 11 | Chango Carmona | 15 Sep – 10 Nov 1972 | 0 |
| 12 | Rodolfo González | 10 No 1972 – 11 Apr 1974 | 2 |
| 13 | Guts Ishimatsu | 11 Apr 1974 – 8 May 1976 | 5 |
| 14 | Esteban de Jesús | 8 May 1976 – 21 Jan 1978 | 3 |
| 15 | Roberto Durán | 21 Jan 1978 – 7 Feb 1979 | 0 |
Durán vacates the title to move up to welterweight.
| 16 | Jim Watt (def. Alfredo Pitalua) | 17 Apr 1979 – 20 Jun 1981 | 4 |
| 17 | Alexis Argüello | 20 Jun 1981 – 15 Feb 1983 | 4 |
Argüello vacates the title to move up to super lightweight.
| 18 | Edwin Rosario (def. José Luis Ramírez) | 1 May 1983 – 3 Nov 1984 | 2 |
| 19 | José Luis Ramírez | 3 Nov 1984 – 29 Apr 1987 | 0 |
| 20 | Héctor Camacho | 10 Aug 1985 – 29 Apr 1987 | 2 |
Camacho is stripped of the title for failing to make a title defense.
| 21 | José Luis Ramírez (2) (def. Terrence Alli) | 19 Jul 1987 – 29 Oct 1988 | 2 |
| 22 | Julio César Chávez | 29 Oct 1988 – 25 Jun 1989 | 0 |
Chávez won the WBC super lightweight title on 13 May. The earliest report of the lightweight title being vacated was on 25 June 1989.
| 23 | Pernell Whitaker (def. José Luis Ramírez) | 20 Aug 1989 – 13 Apr 1992 | 6 |
Whitaker vacates the title to move up to super lightweight.
| 24 | Miguel Ángel González (def. Wilfrido Rocha) | 24 Aug 1992 – 29 Feb 1996 | 10 |
González vacates his title to move up to super lightweight. The earliest report of the lightweight title being vacated was on 29 February 1996.
| 25 | Jean Baptiste Mendy (def. Lamar Murphy) | 20 Apr 1996 – 1 Mar 1997 | 0 |
| 26 | Stevie Johnston | 1 Mar 1997 – 13 Jun 1998 | 3 |
| 27 | César Bazán | 13 Jun 1998 – 27 Feb 1999 | 2 |
| 28 | Stevie Johnston (2) | 27 Feb 1999 – 17 Jun 2000 | 4 |
| 29 | José Luis Castillo | 17 Jun 2000 – 20 Apr 2002 | 3 |
| 30 | Floyd Mayweather Jr. | 20 Apr 2002 – 30 May 2004 | 3 |
José Luis Castillo and Juan Lazcano was originally fighting for the interim title but was later changed for the vacant world title on 30 May, just days after Mayweather Jr. won at the super lightweight division.
| 31 | José Luis Castillo (2) (def. Juan Lazcano) | 5 Jun 2004 – 7 May 2005 | 2 |
| 32 | Diego Corrales | 7 May 2005 – 6 Oct 2006 | 0 |
Corrales is stripped of the title for being overweight in his fight against Casamayor.
| 33 | Joel Casamayor (def. Diego Corrales) | 7 Oct 2006 – 22 Feb 2007 | 0 |
Casamayor is stripped of the title for refusing to fight his mandatory challenger.
| 34 | David Díaz (interim champion promoted) | 22 Feb 2007 – 28 Jun 2008 | 1 |
| 35 | Manny Pacquiao | 28 Jun 2008 – 24 Feb 2009 | 0 |
Pacquiao vacates the title to move up to super lightweight.
| 36 | Edwin Valero (def. Antonio Pitalúa) | 4 Apr 2009 – 9 Feb 2010 | 2 |
Valero is declared champion in recess after receiving a deep cut in his fight against Antonio DeMarco.
| 37 | Humberto Soto (def. David Díaz) | 13 Mar 2010 – 1 Jul 2011 | 4 |
Soto vacates the title to move up to super lightweight.
| 38 | Antonio DeMarco (def. Jorge Linares) | 15 Oct 2011 – 17 Nov 2012 | 2 |
| 39 | Adrien Broner | 17 Nov 2012 – 29 Jan 2014 | 1 |
Broner is stripped of his title for failing to defend his title for almost a year.
| 40 | Omar Figueroa Jr. (interim champion promoted) | 29 Jan – 10 Nov 2014 | 2 |
Figueroa Jr. is declared champion in recess because of injury.
| 41 | Jorge Linares (def. Javier Prieto) | 30 Dec 2014 – 22 Feb 2016 | 2 |
Linares is declared champion in recess because of fractured hand.
| 42 | Dejan Zlatičanin (def. Franklin Mamani) | 11 Jun 2016 – 28 Jan 2017 | 0 |
| 43 | Mikey Garcia | 28 Jan 2017 – 25 Apr 2019 | 1 |
Garcia vacates the title to move up to welterweight.
| 44 | Vasiliy Lomachenko (def. Luke Campbell) | 31 Aug – 23 Oct 2019 | 0 |
Lomachenko is designated by the WBC as Franchise champion.
| 45 | Devin Haney (interim champion promoted) | 23 Oct – 12 Dec 2019 | 1 |
Haney is declared champion in recess after injuring his right shoulder.
| 46 | Devin Haney (2) (reinstated) | 22 Apr 2020 – 1 Aug 2023 | 6 |
Haney is declared champion in recess after opting to challenge for the WBC super lightweight title.
| 47 | Shakur Stevenson (def. Edwin De Los Santos) | 16 Nov 2023 – 4 Feb 2026 | 3 |
Stevenson is stripped of the title days after winning the WBO super lightweight title.
| 48 | William Zepeda (def. Lamont Roach Jr.) | 1 Aug 2026 – present | 0 |

== Super featherweight ==
| No. | Name | Reign | Defenses |
|---|---|---|---|
| 1 | Gabriel Elorde (def. Johnny Bizzaro) | 16 Feb 1963 – 15 Jun 1967 | 5 |
| 2 | Yoshiaki Numata | 15 Jun – 14 Dec 1967 | 0 |
| 3 | Hiroshi Kobayashi | 14 Dec 1967 – 20 Jan 1969 | 2 |
Kobayashi is stripped of the title for refusing to fight René Barrientos.
| 4 | Rene Barrientos (def. Rubén Navarro) | 15 Feb 1969 – 5 Apr 1970 | 0 |
| 5 | Yoshiaki Numata (2) | 5 Apr 1970 – 10 Oct 1971 | 3 |
| 6 | Ricardo Arredondo | 10 Oct 1971 – 28 Feb 1974 | 5 |
| 7 | Kuniaki Shibata | 28 Feb 1974 – 5 Jul 1975 | 3 |
| 8 | Alfredo Escalera | 5 Jul 1975 – 28 Jan 1978 | 10 |
| 9 | Alexis Argüello | 28 Jan 1978 – 1 Nov 1980 | 8 |
Argüello vacates the title to move up to lightweight. The title is declared vacant on WBC's ranking released on 1 November.
| 10 | Rafael Limón (def. Idelfonso Bethelmy) | 11 Dec 1980 – 8 Mar 1981 | 0 |
| 11 | Cornelius Boza-Edwards | 8 Mar – 29 Aug 1981 | 1 |
| 12 | Rolando Navarrete | 29 Aug 1981 – 29 May 1982 | 1 |
| 13 | Rafael Limón (2) | 29 May – 11 Dec 1982 | 1 |
| 14 | Bobby Chacon | 11 Dec 1982 – 27 Jun 1983 | 1 |
Chacon is stripped of the title for refusing to fight his mandatory challenger.
| 15 | Héctor Camacho (def. Rafael Limón) | 7 Aug 1983 – 6 Jul 1984 | 1 |
Camacho vacates the title to move up to lightweight.
| 16 | Julio César Chávez (def. Mario Martínez) | 13 Sep 1984 – 29 Dec 1987 | 9 |
Chávez vacates the title to stay at lightweight. The title is vacated on WBC's ratings released on 29 December.
| 17 | Azumah Nelson (def. Mario Martínez) | 29 Feb 1988 – 7 May 1994 | 10 |
| 18 | Jesse James Leija | 7 May – 17 Sep 1994 | 0 |
| 19 | Gabriel Ruelas | 17 Sep 1994 – 1 Dec 1995 | 2 |
| 20 | Azumah Nelson (2) | 1 Dec 1995 – 22 Mar 1997 | 1 |
| 21 | Genaro Hernández | 22 Mar 1997 – 3 Oct 1998 | 3 |
| 22 | Floyd Mayweather Jr. | 3 Oct 1998 – 14 May 2002 | 8 |
Mayweather Jr. vacates the title to stay at lightweight. The title is vacated on WBC's ratings released on 14 May.
| 23 | Sirimongkol Singwangcha (def. Kengo Nagashima) | 24 Aug 2002 – 15 Aug 2003 | 1 |
| 24 | Jesús Chávez | 15 Aug 2003 – 28 Feb 2004 | 0 |
| 25 | Érik Morales | 28 Feb – 27 Nov 2004 | 1 |
| 26 | Marco Antonio Barrera | 27 Nov 2004 – 17 Mar 2007 | 4 |
| 27 | Juan Manuel Márquez | 17 Mar 2007 – 15 Mar 2008 | 1 |
| 28 | Manny Pacquiao | 15 Mar – 16 Jul 2008 | 0 |
Pacquiao vacates the title to stay at lightweight.
| 29 | Humberto Soto (def. Francisco Lorenzo) | 20 Dec 2008 – 18 Mar 2010 | 3 |
Soto vacates the title to stay at lightweight.
| 30 | Vitali Tajbert (interim champion promoted) | 18 Mar – 26 Nov 2010 | 1 |
| 31 | Takahiro Ao | 26 Nov 2010 – 27 Oct 2012 | 3 |
| 32 | Gamaliel Díaz | 27 Oct 2012 – 8 Apr 2013 | 0 |
| 33 | Takashi Miura | 8 Apr 2013 – 21 Nov 2015 | 4 |
| 34 | Francisco Vargas | 21 Nov 2015 – 28 Jan 2017 | 1 |
| 35 | Miguel Berchelt | 28 Jan 2017 – 20 Feb 2021 | 6 |
| 36 | Óscar Valdez | 20 Feb 2021 – 30 Apr 2022 | 1 |
| 37 | Shakur Stevenson | 30 Apr – 22 Sep 2022 | 0 |
Stevenson was stripped of the title after missing weight in his fight against mandatory challenger Robson Conceição.
| 38 | O'Shaquie Foster (def. Rey Vargas) | 11 Feb 2023 – 6 Jul 2024 | 2 |
| 39 | Robson Conceição | 6 Jul – 2 Nov 2024 | 0 |
| 40 | O'Shaquie Foster (2) | 2 Nov 2024 – present | 2 |

== Featherweight ==
| No. | Name | Reign | Defenses |
|---|---|---|---|
| 1 | Sugar Ramos (def. Davey Moore) | 21 Mar 1963 – 26 Sep 1964 | 3 |
| 2 | Vicente Saldívar | 26 Sep 1964 – 14 Oct 1967 | 7 |
Saldívar retires for the first time.
| 3 | Howard Winstone (def. Mitsunori Seki) | 23 Jan – 24 Jul 1968 | 0 |
| 4 | José Legrá | 24 Jul 1968 – 21 Jan 1969 | 0 |
| 5 | Johnny Famechon | 21 Jan 1969 – 9 May 1970 | 2 |
| 6 | Vicente Saldívar (2) | 9 May – 11 Dec 1970 | 0 |
| 7 | Kuniaki Shibata | 11 Dec 1970 – 19 May 1972 | 2 |
| 8 | Clemente Sánchez | 19 May – 16 Dec 1972 | 0 |
Sánchez is stripped of the title after failing to make weight against José Legrá.
| 9 | José Legrá (2) (def. Clemente Sánchez) | 16 Dec 1972 – 5 May 1973 | 0 |
| 10 | Éder Jofre | 5 May 1973 – 17 Jun 1974 | 1 |
Jofre is stripped of the title due to inactivity.
| 11 | Bobby Chacon (def. Alfredo Marcano) | 7 Sep 1974 – 20 Jun 1975 | 1 |
| 12 | Rubén Olivares | 20 Jun – 20 Sep 1975 | 0 |
| 13 | David Kotei | 20 Sep 1975 – 13 Nov 1976 | 2 |
| 14 | Danny López | 13 Nov 1976 – 2 Feb 1980 | 8 |
| 15 | Salvador Sánchez | 2 Feb 1980 – 12 Aug 1982 | 9 |
Sánchez died thus making the title vacant.
| 16 | Juan Laporte (def. Mario Miranda) | 15 Sep 1982 – 31 Mar 1984 | 2 |
| 17 | Wilfredo Gómez | 31 Mar – 8 Dec 1984 | 0 |
| 18 | Azumah Nelson | 8 Dec 1984 – 27 Jan 1988 | 6 |
Nelson vacates the title to move up to super featherweight.
| 19 | Jeff Fenech (def. Victor Callejas) | 7 Mar 1988 – 18 Apr 1990 | 3 |
Fenech vacates the title to move up to super featherweight.
| 20 | Marcos Villasana (def. Paul Hodkinson) | 2 Jun 1990 – 14 Nov 1991 | 3 |
| 21 | Paul Hodkinson | 14 Nov 1991 – 28 Apr 1993 | 3 |
| 22 | Gregorio Vargas | 28 Apr – 4 Dec 1993 | 0 |
| 23 | Kevin Kelley | 4 Dec 1993 – 7 Jan 1995 | 2 |
| 24 | Alejandro González | 7 Jan – 23 Sep 1995 | 2 |
| 25 | Manuel Medina | 23 Sep – 11 Dec 1995 | 0 |
| 26 | Luisito Espinosa | 11 Dec 1995 – 15 May 1999 | 7 |
| 27 | César Soto | 15 May – 22 Oct 1999 | 0 |
| 28 | Naseem Hamed | 22 Oct 1999 – 9 Jan 2000 | 0 |
Hamed vacates the title due to his commitment to his WBO title.
| 29 | Guty Espadas Jr. (def. Luisito Espinosa) | 14 Apr 2000 – 17 Feb 2001 | 1 |
| 30 | Érik Morales | 17 Feb 2001 – 22 Jun 2002 | 1 |
| 31 | Marco Antonio Barrera | 22 Jun 2002 | 0 |
Barrera declines the title after winning against Morales.
| 32 | Érik Morales (2) (def. Paulie Ayala) | 16 Nov 2002 – 5 Oct 2003 | 2 |
Morales vacates the title to move up to super featherweight.
| 33 | Chi In-Jin (def. Michael Brodie) | 10 Apr 2004 – 29 Jan 2006 | 3 |
| 34 | Takashi Koshimoto | 29 Jan – 30 Jul 2006 | 0 |
| 35 | Rodolfo López | 30 Jul – 17 Dec 2006 | 0 |
| 36 | Chi In-Jin (2) | 17 Dec 2006 – 31 Jul 2007 | 0 |
Chi vacates the title.
| 37 | Jorge Linares (interim champion promoted) | 31 Jul 2007 – 13 Aug 2008 | 1 |
Linares vacates the title to move up to super featherweight.
| 38 | Óscar Larios (interim champion promoted) | 13 Aug 2008 – 12 Mar 2009 | 2 |
| 39 | Takahiro Ao | 12 Mar – 14 Jul 2009 | 0 |
| 40 | Elio Rojas | 14 Jul 2009 – 27 Sep 2010 | 1 |
Rojas injured his hand and required surgery. The title was later vacated when a bout between Hozumi Hasegawa and Juan Carlos Burgos was announced for the vacant title. Rojas was then declared champion in recess during WBC's convention held on November.
| 41 | Hozumi Hasegawa (def. Juan Carlos Burgos) | 26 Nov 2010 – 8 Apr 2011 | 0 |
| 42 | Jhonny González | 8 Apr 2011 – 14 Sep 2012 | 4 |
| 43 | Daniel Ponce de León | 14 Sep 2012 – 4 May 2013 | 0 |
| 44 | Abner Mares | 4 May – 24 Aug 2013 | 0 |
| 45 | Jhonny González (2) | 24 Aug 2013 – 28 Mar 2015 | 2 |
| 46 | Gary Russell Jr. | 28 Mar 2015 – 22 Jan 2022 | 5 |
| 47 | Mark Magsayo | 22 Jan – 9 Jul 2022 | 0 |
| 48 | Rey Vargas | 9 Jul 2022 – 18 Oct 2024 | 1 |
Vargas is declared champion in recess.
| 49 | Brandon Figueroa (interim champion promoted) | 18 Oct 2024 – 1 Feb 2025 | 0 |
| 50 | Stephen Fulton | 1 Feb – 12 Dec 2025 | 0 |
Fulton vacated the title to stay at the higher weight classes.
| 51 | Bruce Carrington (def. Carlos Castro) | 31 Jan 2026 – present | 1 |

== Super bantamweight ==
| No. | Name | Reign | Defenses |
|---|---|---|---|
| 1 | Rigoberto Riasco (def. Philip Waruinge) | 3 Apr – 9 Oct 1976 | 2 |
| 2 | Royal Kobayashi | 9 Oct – 24 Nov 1976 | 0 |
| 3 | Yum Dong-Kyun | 24 Nov 1976 – 21 May 1977 | 1 |
| 4 | Wilfredo Gómez | 21 May 1977 – 26 May 1983 | 17 |
Gómez vacates the title to move up to featherweight.
| 5 | Jaime Garza (def. Bobby Berna) | 15 Jun 1983 – 3 Nov 1984 | 1 |
| 6 | Juan Meza | 3 Nov 1984 – 18 Aug 1985 | 1 |
| 7 | Lupe Pintor | 18 Aug 1985 – 18 Jan 1986 | 0 |
| 8 | Samart Payakaroon | 18 Jan 1986 – 8 May 1987 | 1 |
| 9 | Jeff Fenech | 8 May 1987 – 27 Jan 1988 | 2 |
Fenech vacates the title to move up to featherweight.
| 10 | Daniel Zaragoza (def. Carlos Zárate) | 29 Feb 1988 – 23 Apr 1990 | 5 |
| 11 | Paul Banke | 23 Apr – 5 Nov 1990 | 1 |
| 12 | Pedro Rubén Décima | 5 Nov 1990 – 23 Feb 1991 | 0 |
| 13 | Kiyoshi Hatanaka | 23 Feb – 24 Jun 1991 | 0 |
| 14 | Daniel Zaragoza (2) | 24 Jun 1991 – 20 Mar 1992 | 2 |
| 15 | Thierry Jacob | 20 Mar – 23 Jun 1992 | 0 |
| 16 | Tracy Harris Patterson | 23 Jun 1992 – 26 Aug 1994 | 4 |
| 17 | Hector Acero Sánchez | 26 Aug 1994 – 6 Nov 1995 | 2 |
| 18 | Daniel Zaragoza (3) | 6 Nov 1995 – 6 Sep 1997 | 4 |
| 19 | Érik Morales | 6 Sep 1997 – 20 Jul 2000 | 9 |
Morales vacates the title to move up to featherweight.
| 20 | Willie Jorrín (def. Michael Brodie) | 9 Sep 2000 – 1 Nov 2002 | 2 |
| 21 | Óscar Larios | 1 Nov 2002 – 12 Dec 2005 | 7 |
| 22 | Israel Vázquez | 12 Dec 2005 – 3 Mar 2007 | 2 |
| 23 | Rafael Márquez | 3 Mar – Aug 2007 | 0 |
| 24 | Israel Vázquez (2) | 4 Aug 2007 – 18 Dec 2008 | 1 |
Vázquez is stripped of the title after failing to defend the title due to a detached retina.
| 25 | Toshiaki Nishioka (interim champion promoted) | 18 Dec 2008 – 15 Mar 2012 | 7 |
Nishioka is designated by the WBC as Champion Emeritus.
| 26 | Abner Mares (def. Eric Morel) | 21 Apr 2012 – 31 Jan 2013 | 1 |
Mares vacates the title to move up to featherweight.
| 27 | Victor Terrazas (def. Cristian Mijares) | 20 Apr – 24 Aug 2013 | 0 |
| 28 | Léo Santa Cruz | 24 Aug 2013 – 1 Nov 2015 | 4 |
Santa Cruz vacates the title to stay at featherweight.
| 29 | Julio Ceja (interim champion promoted) | 1 Nov 2015 – 27 Feb 2016 | 0 |
| 30 | Hugo Ruiz | 27 Feb – 16 Sep 2016 | 0 |
| 31 | Hozumi Hasegawa | 16 Sep – 9 Dec 2016 | 0 |
Hasegawa retires.
| 32 | Rey Vargas (def. Gavin McDonnell) | 25 Feb 2017 – 14 Aug 2020 | 5 |
Vargas is declared champion in recess after breaking his leg.
| 33 | Luis Nery (def. Aarón Alameda) | 26 Sep 2020 – 15 May 2021 | 0 |
| 34 | Brandon Figueroa | 15 May – 27 Nov 2021 | 0 |
| 35 | Stephen Fulton | 27 Nov 2021 – 25 Jul 2023 | 1 |
| 36 | Naoya Inoue | 25 Jul 2023 – present | 8 |

== Bantamweight ==
| No. | Name | Reign | Defenses |
|---|---|---|---|
| 1 | Éder Jofre (def. Katsutoshi Aoki) | 4 Apr 1963 – 18 May 1965 | 2 |
| 2 | Fighting Harada | 18 May 1965 – 27 Feb 1968 | 4 |
| 3 | Lionel Rose | 27 Feb 1968 – 22 Aug 1969 | 3 |
| 4 | Rubén Olivares | 22 Aug 1969 – 16 Oct 1970 | 2 |
| 5 | Chucho Castillo | 16 Oct 1970 – 2 Apr 1971 | 0 |
| 6 | Rubén Olivares (2) | 2 Apr 1971 – 19 Mar 1972 | 2 |
| 7 | Rafael Herrera | 19 Mar – 29 Jul 1972 | 0 |
| 8 | Enrique Pinder | 29 Jul 1972 – 5 Jan 1973 | 0 |
Pinder was stripped of the title for failing to defend it against the number one contender within six months of winning it.
| 9 | Rafael Herrera (2) (def. Rodolfo Martínez) | 14 Apr 1973 – 7 Dec 1974 | 2 |
| 10 | Rodolfo Martínez | 7 Dec 1974 – 8 May 1976 | 3 |
| 11 | Carlos Zárate | 8 May 1976 – 3 Jun 1979 | 9 |
| 12 | Lupe Pintor | 3 Jun 1979 – 9 Jul 1983 | 8 |
Pintor was stripped of the title after failing to defend it in over a year.
| 13 | Alberto Dávila (interim champion promoted) | 1 Sep 1983 – 23 Mar 1985 | 1 |
Dávila was stripped of the title for injuring his back resulting in failing to defend the title. The title was declared vacant in WBC's March rankings released on 23 March.
| 14 | Daniel Zaragoza (def. Fred Jackson) | 4 May – 9 Aug 1985 | 0 |
| 15 | Miguel Lora | 9 Aug 1985 – 29 Oct 1988 | 7 |
| 16 | Raúl Pérez | 29 Oct 1988 – 25 Feb 1991 | 7 |
| 17 | Greg Richardson | 25 Feb – 19 Sep 1991 | 1 |
| 18 | Joichiro Tatsuyoshi | 19 Sep 1991 – 17 Sep 1992 | 0 |
| 19 | Victor Rabanales | 17 Sep 1992 – 28 Mar 1993 | 1 |
| 20 | Byun Jung-Il | 28 Mar – 23 Dec 1993 | 1 |
| 21 | Yasuei Yakushiji | 23 Dec 1993 – 30 Jul 1995 | 4 |
| 22 | Wayne McCullough | 30 Jul 1995 – 11 Jan 1997 | 2 |
The title is vacated automatically when McCullough stepped on the ring against WBC super bantamweight champion Daniel Zaragoza.
| 23 | Sirimongkol Singmanasak (interim champion promoted) | 11 Jan – 22 Nov 1997 | 3 |
| 24 | Joichiro Tatsuyoshi (2) | 22 Nov 1997 – 29 Dec 1998 | 2 |
| 25 | Veeraphol Sahaprom | 29 Dec 1998 – 16 Apr 2005 | 14 |
| 26 | Hozumi Hasegawa | 16 Apr 2005 – 30 Apr 2010 | 10 |
| 27 | Fernando Montiel | 30 Apr 2010 – 19 Feb 2011 | 1 |
| 28 | Nonito Donaire | 19 Feb – 22 Oct 2011 | 1 |
Donaire vacates the title to move up to super bantamweight.
| 29 | Shinsuke Yamanaka (def. Christian Esquivel) | 6 Nov 2011 – 15 Aug 2017 | 12 |
| 30 | Luis Nery | 15 Aug 2017 – 28 Feb 2018 | 0 |
Nery was stripped of the title after failing to make weight the day before his rematch against Shinsuke Yamanaka.
| 31 | Nordine Oubaali (def. Rau'shee Warren) | 19 Jan 2019 – 13 Nov 2020 | 2 |
Oubaali was declared champion in recess after testing positive for COVID-19.
| 32 | Nordine Oubaali (2) (reinstated) | 10 Jan – 29 May 2021 | 0 |
| 33 | Nonito Donaire (2) | 29 May 2021 – 7 Jun 2022 | 1 |
| 34 | Naoya Inoue | 7 Jun 2022 – 13 Jan 2023 | 1 |
Inoue vacates the title to move up to super bantamweight.
| 35 | Alexandro Santiago (def. Nonito Donaire) | 29 Jul 2023 – 24 Feb 2024 | 0 |
| 36 | Junto Nakatani | 24 Feb 2024 – 18 Sep 2025 | 4 |
Nakatani vacates the title to move up to super bantamweight.
| 37 | Takuma Inoue (def. Tenshin Nasukawa) | 24 Nov 2025 – present | 2 |

== Super flyweight ==
| No. | Name | Reign | Defenses |
|---|---|---|---|
| 1 | Rafael Orono (def. Lee Seung-Hoon) | 2 Feb 1980 – 24 Jan 1981 | 3 |
| 2 | Kim Chul-Ho | 24 Jan 1981 – 28 Nov 1982 | 5 |
| 3 | Rafael Orono (2) | 28 Nov 1982 – 27 Nov 1983 | 3 |
| 4 | Payao Poontarat | 27 Nov 1983 – 5 Jul 1984 | 1 |
| 5 | Jiro Watanabe | 5 Jul 1984 – 30 Mar 1986 | 4 |
| 6 | Gilberto Román | 30 Mar 1986 – 16 May 1987 | 6 |
| 7 | Santos Laciar | 16 May – 8 Aug 1987 | 0 |
| 8 | Sugar Baby Rojas | 8 Aug 1987 – 8 Apr 1988 | 1 |
| 9 | Gilberto Román (2) | 8 Apr 1988 – 7 Nov 1989 | 5 |
| 10 | Nana Konadu | 7 Nov 1989 – 20 Jan 1990 | 0 |
| 11 | Moon Sung-Kil | 20 Jan 1990 – 13 Nov 1993 | 9 |
| 12 | José Luis Bueno | 13 Nov 1993 – 4 May 1994 | 0 |
| 13 | Hiroshi Kawashima | 4 May 1994 – 20 Feb 1997 | 6 |
| 14 | Gerry Peñalosa | 20 Feb 1997 – 29 Aug 1998 | 3 |
| 15 | Choi In-Joo | 29 Aug 1998 – 27 Aug 2000 | 5 |
| 16 | Masamori Tokuyama | 27 Aug 2000 – 28 Jun 2004 | 8 |
| 17 | Katsushige Kawashima | 28 Jun 2004 – 18 Jul 2005 | 2 |
| 18 | Masamori Tokuyama (2) | 18 Jul 2005 – 6 Dec 2006 | 1 |
Tokuyama vacated the title and announced his retirement.
| 19 | Cristian Mijares (interim champion promoted) | 6 Dec 2006 – 1 Nov 2008 | 7 |
| 20 | Vic Darchinyan | 1 Nov 2008 – 3 Aug 2010 | 3 |
Darchinyan vacated the title to move up to bantamweight and is designated by the WBC as Champion Emeritus.
| 21 | Tomás Rojas (def. Kohei Kono) | 20 Sep 2010 – 10 Aug 2011 | 2 |
| 22 | Suriyan Sor Rungvisai | 19 Aug 2011 – 27 Mar 2012 | 1 |
| 23 | Yota Sato | 27 Mar 2012 – 3 May 2013 | 2 |
| 24 | Srisaket Sor Rungvisai | 3 May 2013 – 31 May 2014 | 1 |
| 25 | Carlos Cuadras | 31 May 2014 – 10 Sep 2016 | 6 |
| 26 | Román González | 10 Sep 2016 – 18 Mar 2017 | 0 |
| 27 | Srisaket Sor Rungvisai (2) | 18 Mar 2017 – 26 Apr 2019 | 3 |
| 28 | Juan Francisco Estrada | 26 Apr 2019 – 26 Mar 2021 | 3 |
Estrada is designated as Franchise champion to avoid his mandatory obligation and pursued an immediate rematch with Román González.
| 29 | Jesse Rodriguez (def. Carlos Cuadras) | 5 Feb – 26 Oct 2022 | 2 |
Rodríguez vacated the title to move down to flyweight.
| 30 | Juan Francisco Estrada (2) (def. Román González) | 3 Dec 2022 – 29 Jun 2024 | 0 |
| 31 | Jesse Rodríguez (2) | 29 Jun 2024 – 9 Jun 2026 | 3 |
Rodríguez vacated the title to move up to bantamweight.
| 32 | Ricardo Malajika (def. Tomoya Tsuboi) | 27 Sep 2026 – present | 0 |

== Flyweight ==
| No. | Name | Reign | Defenses |
|---|---|---|---|
| 1 | Pone Kingpetch (awarded inaugural title) | 14 Feb – 18 Sep 1963 | 0 |
| 2 | Hiroyuki Ebihara | 18 Sep 1963 – 23 Jan 1964 | 0 |
| 3 | Pone Kingpetch (2) | 23 Jan 1964 – 23 Apr 1965 | 0 |
| 4 | Salvatore Burruni | 23 Apr – 19 Nov 1965 | 0 |
Burruni was stripped of the title for failing to defend it against Hiroyuki Ebihara.
| 5 | Horacio Accavallo (def. Katsuyoshi Takayama) | 1 Mar 1966 – 2 Oct 1968 | 1 |
Accavallo retired.
| 6 | Chartchai Chionoi (def. Bernabe Villacampo) | 10 Nov 1968 – 23 Feb 1969 | 4 |
| 7 | Efren Torres | 23 Feb 1969 – 20 Mar 1970 | 1 |
| 8 | Chartchai Chionoi (2) | 20 Mar – 7 Dec 1970 | 0 |
| 9 | Erbito Salavarria | 7 Dec 1970 – 29 Dec 1971 | 2 |
Salavarria was stripped of the title after a liquid he drank between rounds during his 20 November 1971 bout against Betulio González tested positive for amphetamine. González was then awarded the title.
| 10 | Betulio González (awarded title) | 29 Dec 1971 – 29 Sep 1972 | 1 |
| 11 | Venice Borkhorsor | 29 Sep 1972 – 11 Jul 1973 | 1 |
Borkhorsor vacated the title to move up to bantamweight.
| 12 | Betulio González (2) (def. Miguel Canto) | 4 Aug 1973 – 1 Oct 1974 | 2 |
| 13 | Shoji Oguma | 1 Oct 1974 – 8 Jan 1975 | 0 |
| 14 | Miguel Canto | 8 Jan 1975 – 18 Mar 1979 | 14 |
| 15 | Park Chan-Hee | 18 Mar 1979 – 18 May 1980 | 5 |
| 16 | Shoji Oguma (2) | 18 May 1980 – 12 May 1981 | 3 |
| 17 | Antonio Avelar | 12 May 1981 – 20 Mar 1982 | 1 |
| 18 | Prudencio Cardona | 20 Mar – 24 Jul 1982 | 0 |
| 19 | Freddy Castillo | 24 Jul – 6 Nov 1982 | 0 |
| 20 | Eleoncio Mercedes | 6 Nov 1982 – 15 Mar 1983 | 0 |
| 21 | Charlie Magri | 15 Mar – 27 Sep 1983 | 0 |
| 22 | Frank Cedeno | 27 Sep 1983 – 18 Jan 1984 | 0 |
| 23 | Kōji Kobayashi | 18 Jan – 9 Apr 1984 | 0 |
| 24 | Gabriel Bernal | 9 Apr – 8 Oct 1984 | 1 |
| 25 | Sot Chitalada | 8 Oct 1984 – 24 Jul 1988 | 6 |
| 26 | Kim Yong-Kang | 24 Jul 1988 – 3 Jun 1989 | 2 |
| 27 | Sot Chitalada (2) | 3 Jun 1989 – 15 Feb 1991 | 4 |
| 28 | Muangchai Kittikasem | 15 Feb 1991 – 23 Jun 1992 | 3 |
| 29 | Yuri Arbachakov | 23 Jun 1992 – 12 Nov 1997 | 9 |
| 30 | Chatchai Singwangcha | 12 Nov 1997 – 4 Dec 1998 | 4 |
| 31 | Manny Pacquiao | 4 Dec 1998 – 16 Sep 1999 | 1 |
Pacquiao was stripped of the title after failing to make weight the day before his bout against Medgoen Singsurat.
| 32 | Medgoen Singsurat (def. Manny Pacquiao) | 17 Sep 1999 – 19 May 2000 | 1 |
| 33 | Malcolm Tuñacao | 19 May 2000 – 2 Mar 2001 | 1 |
| 34 | Pongsaklek Wonjongkam | 2 Mar 2001 – 18 Jul 2007 | 17 |
| 35 | Daisuke Naito | 18 Jul 2007 – 29 Nov 2009 | 5 |
| 36 | Kōki Kameda | 29 Nov 2009 – 27 Mar 2010 | 0 |
| 37 | Pongsaklek Wonjongkam (2) | 27 Mar 2010 – 2 Mar 2012 | 4 |
| 38 | Sonny Boy Jaro | 2 Mar – 16 Jul 2012 | 0 |
| 39 | Toshiyuki Igarashi | 16 Jul 2012 – 8 Apr 2013 | 1 |
| 40 | Akira Yaegashi | 8 Apr 2013 – 5 Sep 2014 | 3 |
| 41 | Román González | 5 Sep 2014 – 1 Oct 2016 | 4 |
González vacated the title in favor of his WBC super flyweight title.
| 42 | Juan Hernández Navarrete (def. Nawaphon Sor Rungvisai) | 4 Mar – 20 May 2017 | 0 |
| 43 | Daigo Higa | 20 May 2017 – 14 Apr 2018 | 2 |
Higa was stripped of the title for failing to make weight the day before his bout against Cristofer Rosales.
| 44 | Cristofer Rosales (def. Daigo Higa) | 15 Apr – 22 Dec 2018 | 1 |
| 45 | Charlie Edwards | 22 Dec 2018 – 4 Oct 2019 | 2 |
Edwards vacated the title over concerns of not being able to make weight.
| 46 | Julio Cesar Martínez (def. Cristofer Rosales) | 20 Dec 2019 – 22 May 2024 | 6 |
Martínez vacated the title to move up to super flyweight.
| 47 | Kenshiro Teraji (def. Cristofer Rosales) | 13 Oct 2024 – 30 Jul 2025 | 1 |
| 48 | Ricardo Sandoval | 30 Jul 2025 – 10 Oct 2026 | 0 |
| 49 | Sergio Mendoza | 10 Oct 2026 – present | 0 |

== Light flyweight ==
| No. | Name | Reign | Defenses |
|---|---|---|---|
| 1 | Franco Udella (def. Valentin Martinez) | 4 Apr – 29 Aug 1975 | 1 |
Udella was stripped of the title after withdrawing from a 12 September bout against Rafael Lovera due to a fever.
| 2 | Luis Estaba (def. Rafael Lovera) | 13 Sep 1975 – 19 Feb 1978 | 11 |
| 3 | Freddy Castillo | 19 Feb – 6 May 1978 | 0 |
| 4 | Netrnoi Sor Vorasingh | 6 May – 30 Sep 1978 | 1 |
| 5 | Kim Sung-Jun | 30 Sep 1978 – 3 Jan 1980 | 3 |
| 6 | Shigeo Nakajima | 3 Jan – 24 Mar 1980 | 0 |
| 7 | Hilario Zapata | 24 Ma 1980 – 6 Feb 1982 | 8 |
| 8 | Amado Ursua | 6 Feb – 13 Apr 1982 | 0 |
| 9 | Tadashi Tomori | 13 Apr – 20 Jul 1982 | 0 |
| 10 | Hilario Zapata (2) | 20 Jul 1982 – 26 Mar 1983 | 2 |
| 11 | Chang Jung-Koo | 26 Mar 1983 – 14 Oct 1988 | 15 |
Jung-koo vacates the title due to being exhausted by chronic insomnia.
| 12 | Germán Torres (def. Kang Soon-Jung) | 11 Dec 1988 – 19 Mar 1989 | 0 |
| 13 | Lee Yul-Woo | 19 Mar – 25 Jun 1989 | 0 |
| 14 | Humberto González | 25 Jun 1989 – 19 Dec 1990 | 5 |
| 15 | Rolando Pascua | 19 Dec 1990 – 25 Mar 1991 | 0 |
| 16 | Melchor Cob Castro | 25 Mar – 3 Jun 1991 | 0 |
| 17 | Humberto González (2) | 3 Jun 1991 – 13 Mar 1993 | 4 |
| 18 | Michael Carbajal | 13 Mar 1993 – 19 Feb 1994 | 2 |
| 19 | Humberto González (3) | 19 Feb 1994 – 15 Jul 1995 | 3 |
| 20 | Saman Sorjaturong | 15 Jul 1995 – 17 Oct 1999 | 10 |
| 21 | Choi Yo-Sam | 17 Oct 1999 – 6 Jul 2002 | 3 |
| 22 | Jorge Arce | 6 Jul 2002 – 23 Feb 2005 | 7 |
The title is vacated when a report of a bout for the vacant title was released on 23 February.
| 23 | Eric Ortiz (def. José Antonio Aguirre) | 11 Mar – 10 Sep 2005 | 0 |
| 24 | Brian Viloria | 10 Sep 2005 – 10 Aug 2006 | 1 |
| 25 | Omar Niño Romero | 10 Aug 2006 – 1 Feb 2007 | 0 |
Niño was stripped of his title after testing positive for methamphetamine following his rematch against Brian Viloria on 18 Nov 2006.
| 26 | Édgar Sosa (def. Brian Viloria) | 14 Apr 2007 – 21 Nov 2009 | 10 |
| 27 | Rodel Mayol | 21 Nov 2009 – 19 Jun 2010 | 1 |
| 28 | Omar Niño Romero (2) | 19 Jun – 6 Nov 2010 | 1 |
| 29 | Gilberto Keb Baas | 6 Nov 2010 – 30 Apr 2011 | 1 |
| 30 | Adrián Hernández | 30 Apr – 23 Dec 2011 | 1 |
| 31 | Kompayak Porpramook | 23 Dec 2011 – 6 Oct 2012 | 1 |
| 32 | Adrián Hernández (2) | 6 Oct 2012 – 6 Apr 2014 | 4 |
| 33 | Naoya Inoue | 6 Apr – 3 Nov 2014 | 1 |
Inoue vacates the title to move up to super flyweight.
| 34 | Pedro Guevara (def. Akira Yaegashi) | 30 Dec 2014 – 28 Nov 2015 | 2 |
| 35 | Yu Kimura | 28 Nov 2015 – 4 Mar 2016 | 0 |
| 36 | Ganigan López | 4 Mar 2016 – 20 May 2017 | 1 |
| 37 | Kenshiro Teraji | 20 May 2017 – 22 Sep 2021 | 8 |
| 38 | Masamichi Yabuki | 22 Sep 2021 – 19 Mar 2022 | 0 |
| 39 | Kenshiro Teraji (2) | 19 Mar 2022 – 15 Jul 2024 | 4 |
Teraji vacates the title to move up to flyweight.
| 40 | Panya Pradabsri (def. Carlos Cañizales) | 26 Dec 2024 – 1 Aug 2025 | 0 |
| 41 | Carlos Cañizales | 1 Aug – 28 Nov 2025 | 0 |
Cañizales is declared champion in recess.
| 42 | Knockout CP Freshmart (def. Junior Zarate) | 4 Dec 2025 – 15 Mar 2026 | 0 |
| 43 | Shokichi Iwata | 15 Mar 2026 – present | 1 |

== Strawweight ==
| No. | Name | Reign | Defenses |
|---|---|---|---|
| 1 | Hiroki Ioka (def. Mai Thomburifarm) | 18 Oct 1987 – 13 Nov 1988 | 2 |
| 2 | Napa Kiatwanchai | 13 Nov 1988 – 12 Nov 1989 | 2 |
| 3 | Choi Jum-Hwan | 12 Nov 1989 – 7 Feb 1990 | 0 |
| 4 | Hideyuki Ohashi | 7 Feb – 25 Oct 1990 | 1 |
| 5 | Ricardo López | 25 Oct 1990 – 28 Sep 1999 | 21 |
López is stripped of the title when he challenged for the IBF light flyweight title.
| 6 | Wandee Singwangcha (interim champion promoted) | 28 Sep 1999 – 11 Feb 2000 | 0 |
| 7 | José Antonio Aguirre | 11 Feb 2000 – 10 Jan 2004 | 7 |
| 8 | Eagle Den Junlaphan | 10 Jan – 18 Dec 2004 | 1 |
| 9 | Isaac Bustos | 18 Dec 2004 – 4 Apr 2005 | 0 |
| 10 | Katsunari Takayama | 4 Apr – 6 Aug 2005 | 0 |
| 11 | Eagle Den Junlaphan (2) | 6 Aug 2005 – 29 Nov 2007 | 4 |
| 12 | Oleydong Sithsamerchai | 29 Nov 2007 – 11 Feb 2011 | 6 |
| 13 | Kazuto Ioka | 11 Feb 2011 – 1 Jul 2012 | 3 |
Ioka, the unified WBA & WBC strawweight champion, vacated the title because both sanctioning bodies were requiring him to make different mandatory defenses of his titles.
| 14 | Xiong Chaozhong (def. Javier Martínez Resendiz) | 24 Nov 2012 – 5 Feb 2014 | 2 |
| 15 | Oswaldo Novoa | 5 Feb – 6 Nov 2014 | 1 |
| 16 | Wanheng Menayothin | 6 Nov 2014 – 27 Nov 2020 | 12 |
| 17 | Panya Pradabsri | 27 Nov 2020 – 7 Oct 2023 | 4 |
| 18 | Yudai Shigeoka | 7 Oct 2023 – 31 Mar 2024 | 0 |
| 19 | Melvin Jerusalem | 31 Mar 2024 – 16 May 2026 | 3 |
| 20 | Siyakholwa Kuse | 16 May 2026 – present | 0 |

== See also ==
- List of current world boxing champions
- List of undisputed boxing champions
- List of WBA world champions
- List of IBF world champions
- List of WBO world champions
- List of The Ring world champions
- List of NYSAC world champions
- List of WBC female world champions
- List of IBO world champions
- List of current WBC international champions
- List of current WBC youth world champions
