= Leroy Haley =

American boxer (1952–2018)

Personal information
- Nickname: Irish
- Born: December 27, 1952 Garland County, Arkansas, U.S.
- Died: November 1, 2018 (aged 65) St. Louis, Missouri, U.S.
- Height: 5 ft 4 1/2 in (164 cm)
- Weight: Light welterweight

Boxing career
- Reach: 69 in (175 cm)
- Stance: Orthodox

Boxing record
- Total fights: 57
- Wins: 48
- Win by KO: 15
- Losses: 6
- Draws: 2
- No contests: 1

Leroy "Irish" Haley Jr. (December 27, 1952 – November 1, 2018) was an American light welterweight boxer.

== Early life ==
Born in Garland County, Arkansas, he was the fourth child of Leroy Haley Sr. and Bobbie Wallace-Haley. Haley moved to Las Vegas, where in 1971 he graduated from Rancho High School.

== Professional career ==
Haley turned professional in 1973 and captured the WBC light welterweight title with a split decision win over Saoul Mamby in 1982. He defended the belt twice before losing it to Bruce Curry by decision the following year. He lost a split decision in a rematch later that year. He retired in 1985 after two consecutive losses, including a loss to champion Billy Costello.

== Professional boxing record ==
57 fights	48 wins	6 losses
By knockout	15	1
By decision	33	5
Draws	2	
No contests	1	

No.	Result	Record	Opponent	Type	Round, time	Date	Location	Notes
57	Loss	48–6–2 (1)	Ricky Young	UD	10 (10)	1985-12-06	Felt Forum, New York City, New York, U.S.	
56	Loss	48–5–2 (1)	Billy Costello	UD	12 (12)	1985-02-16	Midtown Neighborhood Center, Kingston, New York, U.S.	For WBC super lightweight title
55	Win	48–4–2 (1)	Chuck Peralta	UD	10 (10)	1984-07-18	Riviera Hotel & Casino, Winchester, Nevada, U.S.	
54	Loss	47–4–2 (1)	Bruce Curry	SD	12 (12)	1983-10-19	Showboat Hotel and Casino Sports Pavilion, Las Vegas, Nevada, U.S.	For WBC super lightweight title
53	Loss	47–3–2 (1)	Bruce Curry	UD	12 (12)	1983-05-18	Dunes Hotel & Casino Outdoor Arena, Paradise, Nevada, U.S.	Lost WBC super lightweight title
52	Win	47–2–2 (1)	Saoul Mamby	UD	12 (12)	1983-02-13	Public Hall, Cleveland, Ohio, U.S.	Retained WBC super lightweight title
51	Win	46–2–2 (1)	Juan Jose Gimenez	UD	15 (15)	1982-10-20	Public Hall, Cleveland, Ohio, U.S.	Retained WBC super lightweight title
50	Win	45–2–2 (1)	Saoul Mamby	SD	15 (15)	1982-06-26	Front Row Theater, Highland Heights, Ohio, U.S.	Won WBC super lightweight title
49	Win	44–2–2 (1)	Robert Bo Moody	TKO	3 (10)	1981-11-14	Public Hall, Cleveland, Ohio, U.S.	
48	Win	43–2–2 (1)	Willie Rodriguez	UD	12 (12)	1981-04-11	Caesars Palace Sports Pavilion, Paradise, Nevada, U.S.	Won NABF super lightweight title
47	Win	42–2–2 (1)	Jaime Nava	TKO	6 (10)	1981-01-14	Silver Slipper, Paradise, Nevada, U.S.	
46	Win	41–2–2 (1)	Rocky Ramon	UD	12 (12)	1980-10-15	Silver Slipper, Paradise, Nevada, U.S.	
45	Win	40–2–2 (1)	German Cuello	UD	12 (12)	1979-12-05	Silver Slipper, Paradise, Nevada, U.S.	
44	Win	39–2–2 (1)	Modesto Concepcion	TKO	10 (10)	1979-09-13	Celebrity Theatre, Phoenix, Arizona, U.S.	
43	Win	38–2–2 (1)	Hector Julio Rivera	UD	10 (10)	1979-08-02	Celebrity Theatre, Phoenix, Arizona, U.S.	
42	Win	37–2–2 (1)	Javier Ayala	UD	10 (10)	1979-06-27	Silver Slipper, Paradise, Nevada, U.S.	
41	Draw	36–2–2 (1)	Modesto Concepcion	TD	4 (10)	1979-06-15	Sahara Hotel, Winchester, Nevada, U.S.	
40	Loss	36–2–1 (1)	Willie Rodriguez	TKO	12 (12)	1979-02-02	Rockne Hall, Allentown, Pennsylvania, U.S.	For NABF super lightweight title
39	Win	36–1–1 (1)	German Cuello	KO	10 (12)	1978-11-01	Silver Slipper, Paradise, Nevada, U.S.	
38	Win	35–1–1 (1)	Tony Martinez	KO	3 (10)	1978-08-09	Silver Slipper, Paradise, Nevada, U.S.	
37	NC	34–1–1 (1)	Jorge Morales	NC	9 (10)	1978-05-17	Silver Slipper, Paradise, Nevada, U.S.	
36	Win	34–1–1	Augustin Estrada	PTS	10 (10)	1978-03-08	Silver Slipper, Paradise, Nevada, U.S.	
35	Win	33–1–1	Hector Julio Rivera	TKO	8 (10)	1978-01-04	Silver Slipper, Paradise, Nevada, U.S.	
34	Win	32–1–1	David Bernal	UD	10 (10)	1977-11-02	Marina Hotel, Las Vegas, Nevada, U.S.	
33	Win	31–1–1	Victor Hernandez	UD	10 (10)	1977-10-19	Marina Hotel, Las Vegas, Nevada, U.S.	
32	Win	30–1–1	Leonardo Bermudez	UD	12 (12)	1977-05-04	Silver Slipper, Paradise, Nevada, U.S.	
31	Draw	29–1–1	Leonardo Bermudez	SD	10 (10)	1977-04-06	Silver Slipper, Paradise, Nevada, U.S.	
30	Win	29–1	Augustin Estrada	UD	10 (10)	1977-02-02	Silver Slipper, Paradise, Nevada, U.S.	
29	Win	28–1	Earl Young	UD	10 (10)	1976-12-01	Silver Slipper, Paradise, Nevada, U.S.	
28	Win	27–1	Pedro Constancio	UD	10 (10)	1976-09-08	Silver Slipper, Paradise, Nevada, U.S.	
27	Win	26–1	Rudy Barro	UD	10 (10)	1976-08-18	Silver Slipper, Paradise, Nevada, U.S.	
26	Win	25–1	Andres Lovera	UD	10 (10)	1976-06-30	Silver Slipper, Paradise, Nevada, U.S.	
25	Win	24–1	Gene Prado	UD	10 (10)	1976-06-02	Silver Slipper, Paradise, Nevada, U.S.	
24	Win	23–1	Rafael Nunez	UD	8 (8)	1976-05-11	Silver Slipper, Paradise, Nevada, U.S.	
23	Win	22–1	Alejo Sanchez	UD	8 (8)	1976-05-05	Silver Slipper, Paradise, Nevada, U.S.	
22	Win	21–1	Gene Prado	UD	10 (10)	1975-09-17	Silver Slipper, Paradise, Nevada, U.S.	
21	Win	20–1	Eddie Murray	UD	8 (8)	1975-08-27	Silver Slipper, Paradise, Nevada, U.S.	
20	Loss	19–1	Roy Holloway	SD	8 (8)	1975-05-14	Silver Slipper, Paradise, Nevada, U.S.	
19	Win	19–0	Roy Holloway	UD	8 (8)	1975-03-26	Silver Slipper, Paradise, Nevada, U.S.	
18	Win	18–0	Carmelo Enriquez	KO	1 (6)	1975-02-05	Silver Slipper, Paradise, Nevada, U.S.	
17	Win	17–0	Brad Silas	TKO	6 (6)	1975-01-22	Silver Slipper, Paradise, Nevada, U.S.	
16	Win	16–0	Larry Contru	KO	2 (6)	1974-12-11	Silver Slipper, Paradise, Nevada, U.S.	
15	Win	15–0	Danny Stenado	TKO	3 (6)	1974-11-20	Silver Slipper, Paradise, Nevada, U.S.	
14	Win	14–0	Earl Young	UD	6 (6)	1974-03-20	Circus Circus Hippodrome Theater, Winchester, Nevada, U.S.	
13	Win	13–0	Carlos Barragan Vasquez	KO	4 (8)	1973-12-19	Circus Circus Hippodrome Theater, Winchester, Nevada, U.S.	
12	Win	12–0	Daniel Castro	UD	8 (8)	1973-11-21	Circus Circus Hippodrome Theater, Winchester, Nevada, U.S.	
11	Win	11–0	Abby Espinoza	KO	5 (8)	1973-10-25	Sahara Tahoe Hotel, Stateline, Nevada, U.S.	
10	Win	10–0	Demetrio Salazar	TKO	5 (6)	1973-10-03	Circus Circus Hippodrome Theater, Winchester, Nevada, U.S.	
9	Win	9–0	Victor Abraham	UD	6 (6)	1973-09-19	Circus Circus Hippodrome Theater, Winchester, Nevada, U.S.	
8	Win	8–0	Jose Fernandez	KO	5 (8)	1973-09-05	Silver Slipper, Paradise, Nevada, U.S.	
7	Win	7–0	Felipe Mendez	UD	6 (6)	1973-08-27	Circus Circus Hippodrome Theater, Winchester, Nevada, U.S.	
6	Win	6–0	Moses Carbin	UD	5 (5)	1973-08-06	Circus Circus Hippodrome Theater, Winchester, Nevada, U.S.	
5	Win	5–0	Bart Spencer	KO	3 (5)	1973-07-09	Circus Circus Hippodrome Theater, Winchester, Nevada, U.S.	
4	Win	4–0	Demetrio Salazar	UD	8 (8)	1973-06-27	Silver Slipper, Paradise, Nevada, U.S.	
3	Win	3–0	Ezra Davis	UD	4 (4)	1973-06-13	Silver Slipper, Paradise, Nevada, U.S.	
2	Win	2–0	Joe Falcone	UD	5 (5)	1973-05-23	Silver Slipper, Paradise, Nevada, U.S.	
1	Win	1–0	Manny Castillo	UD	4 (4)	1973-05-09	Silver Slipper, Paradise, Nevada, U.S.	

== Death ==
Haley died in November 2018.

== See also ==
- List of world light-welterweight boxing champions

Sporting positions
Regional boxing titles
Vacant Title last held by Nick Furlano	NABF super lightweight champion April 11, 1981 – 1982; Vacated	Vacant Title next held by Ronnie Shields
World boxing titles
Preceded by Saoul Mamby	WBC super lightweight champion June 26, 1982 – May 18, 1983	Succeeded by Bruce Curry
