= Ronnie Shields =

American boxer and boxing trainer

Ronnie Shields (born June 6, 1958 in Port Arthur, Texas) is a former professional boxer in the featherweight division and is currently a boxing trainer.

== Amateur career ==
Shields had a stellar amateur career. In 1974 he was the National Junior Olympics Featherweight champion. In 1975 he was the National Golden Gloves Featherweight champion. In 1976 and 1978 he was the National Golden Gloves Light welterweight champion.

Shields intended to fly on LOT Polish Airlines Flight 7, where several of his teammates would later be killed, but got sick. His trainer said:

That was close. Ronnie was supposed to be on the trip. He was confirmed. The team officials called Monday to give me the itinerary and that's when I had to tell them he was too sick to go."

Both some amateur results and pro results can be found at www.boxrec.com under his boxing name Ronnie Shields.

== Pro career ==
Shields turned pro in 1980. After winning 14 out of his first 15 bouts, Shields fought tougher competition and defeated tough journeymen like Pete Podgorski and contender Saoul Mamby. Then, in 1984 Shields challenged Billy Costello for the WBC light welterweight title, but lost a decision. In 1986 he took on Tsuyoshi Hamada in Japan for the WBC light welterweight title, but lost a split decision. He retired in 1988.

== Trainer ==
After his boxing career, Shields became a trainer in the sport based in Stafford, Texas. Among the fighters he has worked with are:

- Mike Tyson
- Evander Holyfield
- David Tua
- Pernell Whitaker
- Vernon Forrest
- Arturo Gatti
- Juan Díaz
- Kassim Ouma
- Egerton Marcus
- Dominick Guinn
- Raúl Márquez
- Jesse James Leija
- Jesús Chávez
- Kermit Cintron
- Vanes Martirosyan
- Romallis Ellis
- Tomasz Adamek
- Chris Arreola
- Jermell Charlo
- Artur Szpilka

His current stable includes:

- Erislandy Lara
- Jermall Charlo
- Brian Vera
- Edwin Rodríguez
- Mike Lee
- Steve Lovett
- Guillermo Rigondeaux
- Efe Ajagba
- Austin Dulay
- Sena Agbeko
- Filip “El Animal” Hrgović
- Brian Norman Jr.
- Errol “The Truth” Spence Jr

== Awards and recognition ==
- World Boxing Hall of Fame's Trainer of the Year (2003)
