= Lonnie Smith (boxer) =

American boxer

Personal information
- Nickname: Lightning
- Born: Harlan Alonso Smith; November 25, 1962 (age 63) Denver, Colorado, U.S.
- Height: 5 ft 7 1/2 in (171 cm)
- Weight: Light welterweight; Welterweight

Boxing career
- Reach: 68 1/2 in (174 cm)
- Stance: Orthodox

Boxing record
- Total fights: 53
- Wins: 44
- Win by KO: 26
- Losses: 7
- Draws: 2

Harlan Alonso Smith (born November 5, 1962, in Denver, Colorado), known as Lonnie Smith, is an American boxer at Welterweight. He was the WBC Junior Welterweight World Champion when he knocked out the previously undefeated and reigning champion Billy Costello in August 1985.

== Professional career ==
Known as "Lightning" Lonnie, Smith turned pro in 1980 and lost once in his first 22 fights, before he had a win over undefeated Billy Costello to capture the WBC Light Welterweight world title in 1985. He lost the title in his first defense to Rene Arredondo via 5th round TKO.

=== Julio César Chávez fight ===
In 1991 he took on WBC Light Welterweight Title holder Julio César Chávez, but lost a one-sided decision.

Before their bout, the two had a confrontation at McCarran International Airport when Chavez arrived in Las Vegas. This was recorded by Showtime channel's television camera people and shown to viewers before their actual ring encounter.

Smith never again fought for a title, and retired in 1999 after a loss to Diosbelys Hurtado with a record of 45-6-2.

== Professional boxing record ==
53 fights	44 wins	7 losses
By knockout	26	2
By decision	18	5
Draws	2	

No.	Result	Record	Opponent	Type	Round, time	Date	Location	Notes
53	Loss	44–7–2	Diosbelys Hurtado	UD	10 (10)	1999-06-19	Miccosukee Resort & Gaming, Miami, Florida, U.S.	
52	Win	44–6–2	Clarence Barnes	KO	8 (10)	1998-10-30	Hyatt Regency, Tampa, Florida, U.S.	
51	Win	43–6–2	Gilberto Flores	SD	10 (10)	1998-08-15	Odeum, Villa Park, Illinois, U.S.	
50	Win	42–6–2	Reggie Strickland	UD	10 (10)	1998-05-22	Odeum, Villa Park, Illinois, U.S.	
49	Win	41–6–2	Walter Cowans	KO	1 (10)	1998-03-14	Palace Theater, Altoona, Iowa, U.S.	
48	Win	40–6–2	Francisco Barra	TKO	2 (12)	1997-10-29	Sports Arena, San Diego, California, U.S.	
47	Win	39–6–2	Miguel González	KO	5 (10)	1997-04-23	Tropicana, Paradise, Nevada, U.S.	
46	Win	38–6–2	Dennis Allen	UD	10 (10)	1997-02-13	The Aladdin, Paradise, Nevada, U.S.	
45	Win	37–6–2	Sean Crowdus	TKO	3 (?)	1995-08-18	Regency Hotel, Denver, Colorado, U.S.	
44	Win	36–6–2	Jason Wilson	KO	1 (?)	1995-06-09	Peel's Palace, Erlanger, Kentucky, U.S.	
43	Win	35–6–2	Cornell Colbert	TKO	2 (?)	1995-05-12	Peel's Palace, Erlanger, Kentucky, U.S.	
42	Win	34–6–2	Walter Cowans	TKO	1 (10)	1995-04-07	Peel's Palace, Erlanger, Kentucky, U.S.	
41	Win	33–6–2	Marvin Ladson	TKO	2 (10)	1994-10-04	New Daisy Beale, Memphis, Tennessee, U.S.	
40	Win	32–6–2	Jerry Strickland	KO	1 (?)	1994-05-27	Denver, Colorado, U.S.	
39	Win	31–6–2	Tyrone Mack	TKO	6 (10)	1994-02-12	Convention Center, Des Moines, Iowa, U.S.	
38	Loss	30–6–2	Ike Quartey	PTS	10 (10)	1993-10-16	Palais des sports Marcel-Cerdan, Levallois-Perret, France	
37	Loss	30–5–2	Wilfredo Rivera	UD	10 (10)	1993-06-28	Great Western Forum, Inglewood, California, U.S.	
36	Draw	30–4–2	Derrell Coley	MD	10 (10)	1993-05-17	Great Western Forum, Inglewood, California, U.S.	
35	Win	30–4–1	Jorge Hernandez	TKO	2 (?)	1992-12-18	Guadalajara, Mexico	
34	Win	29–4–1	Ismael Diaz	UD	10 (10)	1992-11-24	Country Club, Reseda, California, U.S.	
33	Loss	28–4–1	Julio César Chávez	UD	12 (12)	1991-09-14	The Mirage, Paradise, Nevada, U.S.	For WBC super lightweight title
32	Win	28–3–1	Darren McGrew	TKO	7 (10)	1991-04-07	Diplomat Hotel, Hollywood, Florida, U.S.	
31	Win	27–3–1	Eduardo Valdez	TKO	2 (10)	1990-12-08	Convention Center, Atlantic City, New Jersey, U.S.	
30	Win	26–3–1	Antonio Garcia	UD	10 (10)	1990-10-23	The Aladdin, Paradise, Nevada, U.S.	
29	Win	25–3–1	Henry Anaya Jr	RTD	10 (12)	1990-08-20	Dunes Hotel, Paradise, Nevada, U.S.	Won vacant NABF welterweight title
28	Win	24–3–1	Juan Soberanes	UD	10 (10)	1990-02-16	International Amphitheatre, Chicago, Illinois, U.S.	
27	Win	23–3–1	Roberto Urias	KO	3 (?)	1989-03-16	San Diego, California, U.S.	
26	Win	22–3–1	Ron Villa	TKO	10 (10)	1987-05-08	Denver, Colorado, U.S.	
25	Loss	21–3–1	Andy Nance	SD	10 (10)	1986-12-04	Circle Star Theater, San Carlos, California, U.S.	
24	Loss	21–2–1	René Arredondo	TKO	5 (12)	1986-05-05	Olympic Auditorium, Los Angeles, California, U.S.	Lost WBC super lightweight title
23	Win	21–1–1	Billy Costello	TKO	8 (12)	1985-08-21	Madison Square Garden, New York City, New York, U.S.	Won WBC super lightweight title
22	Win	20–1–1	Joey Soler	UD	10 (10)	1985-05-21	Tropicana Casino & Resort, Atlantic City, New Jersey, U.S.	
21	Win	19–1–1	Frank Montgomery	UD	12 (12)	1984-10-04	Resorts International, Atlantic City, New Jersey, U.S.	
20	Win	18–1–1	Thomas Baker	TKO	9 (10)	1984-07-17	Resorts International, Atlantic City, New Jersey, U.S.	
19	Loss	17–1–1	Todd Longmuir	RTD	7 (10)	1984-05-17	Resorts International, Atlantic City, New Jersey, U.S.	
18	Win	17–0–1	Danny Sanchez	UD	10 (10)	1984-04-26	Resorts International, Atlantic City, New Jersey, U.S.	
17	Win	16–0–1	Forrest Winchester	PTS	10 (10)	1984-03-01	Resorts International, Atlantic City, New Jersey, U.S.	
16	Win	15–0–1	Thomas Baker	UD	8 (8)	1984-01-14	Resorts International, Atlantic City, New Jersey, U.S.	
15	Win	14–0–1	Victor Flores	UD	8 (8)	1982-12-15	Aragon Ballroom, Chicago, Illinois, U.S.	
14	Win	13–0–1	Bobby Jones	UD	8 (8)	1982-08-14	Stouffers Ballroom, Cleveland, Ohio, U.S.	
13	Win	12–0–1	Eugene Ellington	UD	6 (6)	1982-06-26	Front Row Theater, Highland Heights, Ohio, U.S.	
12	Win	11–0–1	Nate Stewart	PTS	6 (6)	1982-04-09	Stouffer's Inn, Cleveland, Ohio, U.S.	
11	Win	10–0–1	C B Brown	TKO	2 (6)	1982-03-21	Playboy Hotel & Casino, Atlantic City, New Jersey, U.S.	
10	Win	9–0–1	Carl Williams	KO	4 (6)	1982-02-24	Playboy Hotel & Casino, Atlantic City, New Jersey, U.S.	
9	Win	8–0–1	Dennis Shea	KO	2 (?)	1982-02-05	Mammoth Gardens, Denver, Colorado, U.S.	
8	Draw	7–0–1	Terry Butler	PTS	6 (6)	1981-08-09	Public Hall, Cleveland, Ohio, U.S.	
7	Win	7–0	Victor Hernandez	PTS	8 (8)	1981-07-01	Silver Slipper, Paradise, Nevada, U.S.	
6	Win	6–0	Bobby Krueger	TKO	1 (?)	1981-06-27	Hacienda Hotel, Paradise, Nevada, U.S.	
5	Win	5–0	Elias Rodriguez	TKO	2 (6)	1981-04-11	Caesars Palace Sports Pavilion, Paradise, Nevada, U.S.	
4	Win	4–0	George Crawford	PTS	4 (4)	1981-03-22	Caesars Palace Sports Pavilion, Paradise, Nevada, U.S.	
3	Win	3–0	Danny Cruz	PTS	4 (4)	1980-10-02	Caesars Palace, Paradise, Nevada, U.S.	
2	Win	2–0	Alberto Sevilla	TKO	1 (4)	1980-08-22	Caesars Palace Sports Pavilion, Paradise, Nevada, U.S.	
1	Win	1–0	Daniel Munoz	KO	2 (4)	1980-08-08	Caesars Palace Sports Pavilion, Paradise, Nevada, U.S.	

== See also ==
- List of world light-welterweight boxing champions

Sporting positions
Regional boxing titles
Vacant Title last held by Aaron Davis	NABF welterweight champion August 20, 1990 – 1990; Vacated	Vacant Title next held by David Gonzalez
World boxing titles
Preceded by Billy Costello	WBC super lightweight champion August 21, 1985 – May 5, 1986	Succeeded by René Arredondo
