= Saoul Mamby =

American boxer (1947–2019)

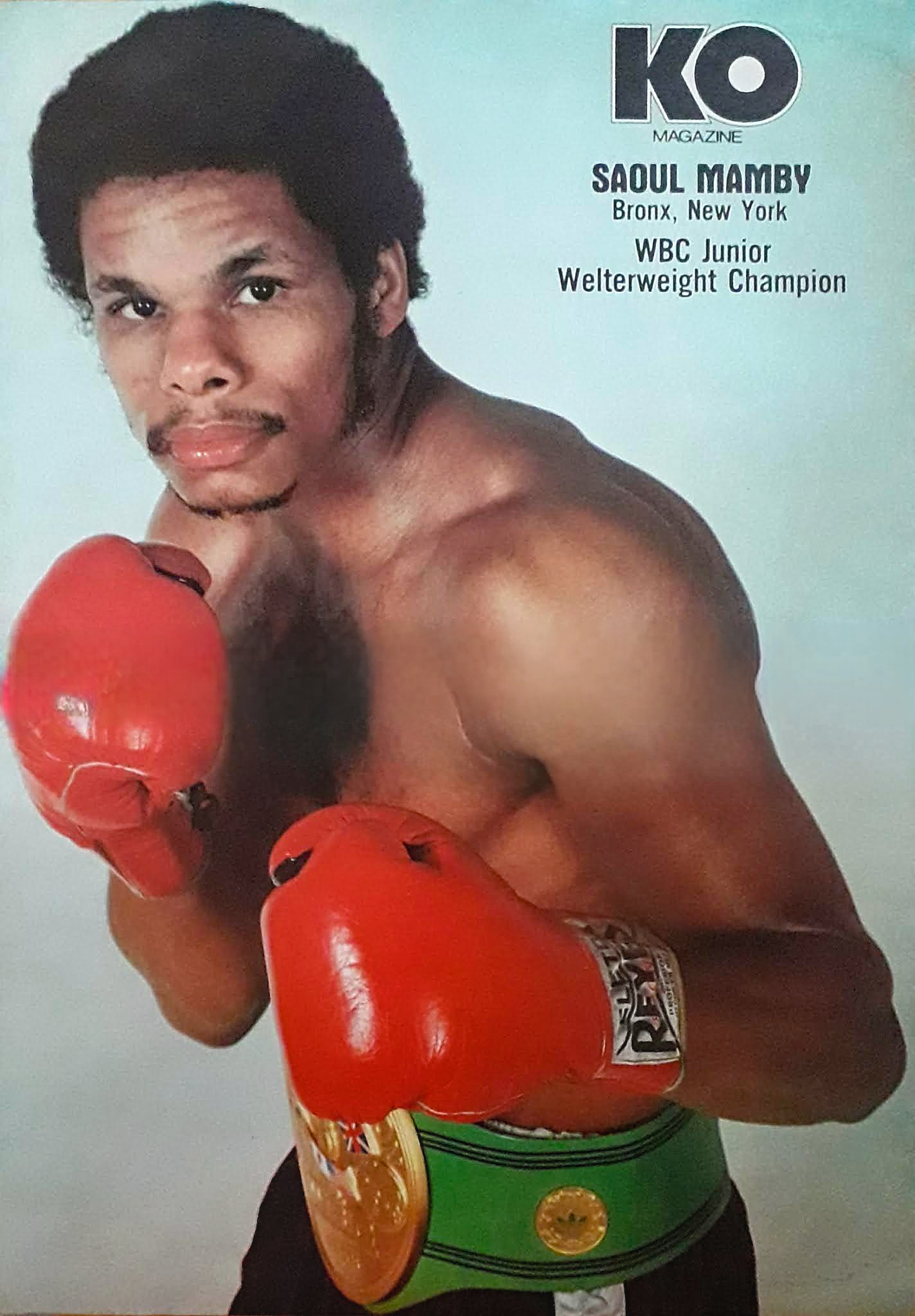
- Mamby c. 1982

Personal information
- Born: Saoul Paul Mamby; June 4, 1947 Bronx, New York, U.S
- Died: December 19, 2019 (aged 72)
- Height: 5 ft 8 in (173 cm)
- Weight: Light welterweight; Welterweight

Boxing career
- Reach: 70 in (178 cm)
- Stance: Orthodox

Boxing record
- Total fights: 85
- Wins: 45
- Win by KO: 18
- Losses: 34
- Draws: 6

Saoul Paul Mamby (June 4, 1947 – December 19, 2019) was an American professional boxer who fought between 1969 and 2008. He held the WBC super lightweight title from 1980 to 1982.

== Personal ==
Mamby was born in South Bronx, New York, to Victoria, of Spanish descent, and father, Robert, from Jamaica. He converted to Judaism at age 4, and went to Hebrew School at the Bronx's Mount Horeb Synagogue.

Mamby became interested in boxing while on vacation in Jamaica. He began his boxing career in 1963 at the age of sixteen, fighting in the Golden Gloves in 1965 and 1966. He compiled an amateur record of 25–5 before turning pro in 1969.

Mamby was a soldier in the U.S. Army and served in Vietnam during the Vietnam War in 1968.

== Boxing career ==
He held the WBC super lightweight title once, starting his 2 1/2-year reign in February 1980 by going to South Korea to stop titlist Kim Sang-Hyun in the 14th round. After that, he made five successful defenses, travelling to Indonesia and Nigeria in the process. He stopped former WBC lightweight champion Esteban De Jesús in the 13th round in July 1980 on the Holmes-LeDoux undercard and decisioned Termite Watkins over 15 on the Holmes-Ali undercard. He won a 15-round nod over Jo Kimpuani on yet another undercard for a Larry Holmes fight against Leon Spinks. He then went to Indonesia to decision Thomas Americo.

In his last bout leaving the ring as champion, he decisioned Obisia Nwankpa in Nigeria.

He was to fight WBA champion Aaron Pryor in the summer of 1982 for a unification bout in the super lightweight division, but instead fought and lost his WBC title by split decision to Leroy Haley in June of that year.

He would play the role of world title challenger twice more, once in a rematch with Haley in February 1983 which he lost in a 12-round unanimous decision. He then challenged new champion Billy Costello in November 1984 but lost another 12-round unanimous decision.

Other boxers Mamby fought include Roberto Durán to whom he lost by points in a non-title fight in 1976, and Saensak Muangsurin to whom he lost in a 15-round decision in Thailand in 1977 in an attempt to win Muangsurin's WBC 140 lb (64 kg) title.

Mamby continued to fight into his 50s, and was forced to retire by the California State athletic commission following his last loss in 2000.

=== Comeback at 60 ===
At the age of 60, Mamby announced a comeback which was to have taken place in Lapwai, Idaho at the Pi-Nee-Waus Community Center of the Nez Perce Tribe, in a card that was subsequently canceled.

Mamby fought several weeks later, weighing 149 1/2 pounds (67 kilograms) and lost a ten-round decision to journeyman fighter Anthony Osbourne in the Cayman Islands. As a result, Mamby became one of the oldest boxers to appear in an officially sanctioned bout. It was Mamby's eleventh loss in his last 14 fights.

Mamby was known for his ability to take punches well; in 85 professional bouts, he was stopped only once, that by an opponent who was several years younger, Derell Coley, in 1993. On June 23, 2024, Mamby was inducted into the Florida Boxing Hall of Fame.

== See also ==
- List of WBC world champions
- List of select Jewish boxers
- List of Afro-Latinos

Sporting positions
World boxing titles
| Preceded by Kim Sang-hyun | WBC super lightweight champion February 23, 1980 – June 26, 1982 | Succeeded by Leroy Haley |
