= Naoya Inoue vs. Paul Butler =

Boxing competition

Undisputed
- Date: 13 December 2022
- Venue: Ariake Arena, Tokyo, Japan
- Title(s) on the line: WBA (Super), WBC, IBF, WBO, and The Ring Undisputed bantamweight titles

Tale of the tape
Boxer	Naoya Inoue	Paul Butler
Nickname	The Monster	Baby Faced Assassin
Hometown	Zama, Kanagawa, Japan	Ellesmere Port, Cheshire, England
Pre-fight record	23–0 (20 KO)	34–2 (15 KO)
Height	5 ft 5 in (165 cm)	5 ft 6 in (168 cm)
Weight	117.9 lb (53 kg)	118 lb (54 kg)
Style	Orthodox	Orthodox
Recognition	WBA (Super), WBC, IBF, and The Ring Bantamweight champion The Ring No. 2 ranked pound-for-pound fighter 3-division world champion	WBO Bantamweight champion

Result
- Inoue wins via 11th round KO

Naoya Inoue vs. Paul Butler, billed as Undisputed, was a bantamweight unification professional boxing match contested between WBA (Super), WBC, IBF, and The Ring champion, Naoya Inoue, and WBO champion, Paul Butler. Inoue knocked out Butler and became the first undisputed bantamweight champion in the four-belt era and the first since Enrique Pinder beat Rafael Herrera in 1972. The bout took place on 13 December 2022, at Ariake Arena in Tokyo, Japan.

== Background ==
Naoya Inoue emerged as the winner of the 2018–19 World Boxing Super Series, when he defeated WBA (Super) champion Nonito Donaire in the final via unanimous decision on 7 November 2019 to unify the WBA (Super), IBF and The Ring bantamweight titles. Inoue would defend his unified titles three times – against challengers Jason Moloney, Michael Dasmariñas and Aran Dipaen – before facing Donaire, who had since won the WBC title, in a rematch on 7 June 2022. Inoue prevailed via second-round technical knockout to unify three of the four major world titles in the bantamweight division and retain his undefeated record.

John Riel Casimero had captured the WBO bantamweight title on 30 November 2019 with a third-round technical knockout victory over Zolani Tete, and a unification clash between Inoue and Casimero had been scheduled for 25 April 2020; however, the fight was ultimately cancelled due to the COVID-19 pandemic. Casimero reigned as the WBO champion until 4 May 2022, when he was stripped by the WBO after twice failing to defend the title against mandatory challenger Paul Butler. Butler, who had defeated Jonas Sultan via unanimous decision twelve days earlier to win the WBO interim title, was elevated to become the full WBO champion, making him a two-time bantamweight champion, having previously held the IBF title in 2014.

== The fight ==
Inoue defeated Paul Butler via 11th-round TKO to become the first undisputed bantamweight champion in boxing’s four-belt era, as he showcased a dominant offense against Butler, who was a very defensive opponent. From the opening bell, Inoue pressed the action, displayed his power, variety and sharp accuracy, targeting both the head and body. Butler mostly adopted a defensive, survival-focused strategy. The fight was largely one-sided, as Butler’s unwillingness to engage made the early rounds appear like a sparring session, though Inoue did apply pressure continuously. In the eleventh, Inoue finally broke through. He jabbed Butler into a corner, landed a hard right hand to the body, followed by an 11-punch flurry to the head, flooring Butler. He could not beat the referee’s count, resulting in a technical knockout at 1:09 of the round. Inoue was up 100–90 on all three scorecards at the time of the stoppage. Butler did not land a single punch in the first round. He landed a total of 38 of 301 punches thrown (12.6%) and Inoue landed 151 of 665 (22.7%).

With this win, Inoue became the first undisputed bantamweight champion since Enrique Pinder in 1972 and the first undisputed bantamweight champion in four-belt era. He also became the first-ever Japanese and Asian boxer to claim undisputed championship status in the three- or four-belt era, as well as the first and only boxer in history to defeat all four major sanctioning organisation champions by knockout. And with this win, he also set the new record for the most wins in unified title bouts in bantamweight history, at 7, surpassing the great bantamweight legend Rubén Olivares. Inoue vacated all five titles on 13 January 2023, as he moved up to super bantamweight.

== Fight card ==
Main card (ESPN+)
Weight class				Method	Round	Time	Notes
Bantamweight	Naoya Inoue (c)	def.	Paul Butler (c)	KO	11/12	1:09	(Note: For WBA (Super), WBC, IBF, WBO, and The Ring bantamweight titles)
Super Lightweight	Andy Hiraoka (c)	def.	Min Ho Jung	TKO	8/12	2:06	(Note: For WBO Asia Pacific super lightweight title)
Super Bantamweight	Yoshiki Takei (c)	def.	Bruno Tarimo	TKO	11/12	2:17	(Note: For OPBF super bantamweight title)
Super Bantamweight	Peter McGrail	def.	Hironori Miyake	KO	2/8	2:00
Super Bantamweight	Takuma Inoue	def.	Jake Bornea	TKO	8/10	2:48
Featherweight	Satoshi Shimizu	def.	Landy Cris Leon	RTD	2/8	3:00

== Broadcasting ==
Country/Region	Free-to-air	Cable/Satellite	PPV	Stream
Japan (host)	—N/a			dTV
United States	—N/a			ESPN+
Australia	—N/a			Main Event, Kayo
