= Chucho Castillo =

Mexican boxer (1944–2013)

Personal information
- Nickname: Chucho
- Born: Jesús Castillo Aguillera; June 17, 1944 Nuevo Valle de Moreno, Guanajuato, Mexico
- Died: January 15, 2013 (aged 68) Mexico City, Mexico
- Height: 5 ft 4 in (163 cm)
- Weight: Bantamweight

Boxing career
- Reach: 70 in (178 cm)
- Stance: Orthodox

Boxing record
- Total fights: 66
- Wins: 47
- Win by KO: 23
- Losses: 17
- Draws: 2

Jesús Castillo Aguilera (June 17, 1944 – January 15, 2013) was a Mexican professional boxer. Better known as Chucho Castillo, he was the Undisputed, WBA and WBC bantamweight world champion in 1970.

Castillo and Rubén Olivares sustained one of the most important rivalries in the history of Mexican boxing. Castillo was described by the boxing book The Ring: Boxing In The 20th Century as quiet and sullen, while Olivares was more of an outgoing partygoer, according to the book. The personality contrast made fans very interested in their matches.

== Early career ==
Castillo was born in Nuevo Valle de Moreno, a small town in the municipality of León, Guanajuato, Mexico. He made his professional debut on 26 April 1962 against Carlos Navarrete, suffering his first loss by a decision after six rounds. His next bout was his first win, outpointing Arnulfo Daza in eight rounds. Castillo built a record of 24 wins and 7 losses, with 11 knockout wins, before facing José Medel for the Mexican Bantamweight title on 29 April 1967. He won the title on points after the twelve rounds, retaining it twice and also winning an additional seven non-title bouts before his first world title challenge. Among the fighters he beat during that streak were Jesus Pimentel and Memo Tellez, who had beaten Castillo twice before.

=== Lineal, WBC & WBA Bantamweight Championship ===
Castillo made his first world title attempt against Australia's Lionel Rose, the first Aboriginal Australian ever to win a world title. The fight was held on 6 December 1968 at the Forum in Inglewood, where Rose won a very unpopular fifteen-round decision in front of a decidedly pro-Castillo crowd, causing a riot. Castillo had eight bouts in 1969, going 5-1-2 during that period. He beat future world champion Rafael Herrera to defend his Mexican title, had a ten-round draw in Tokyo with Ushiwakamaru Harada, drew with Medel, and split two decisions with Raul Cruz.

=== Castillo vs. Olivares ===
In 1970, Castillo was given a second world title chance when he and Olivares clashed to begin their three fight rivalry, with all three fights taking place at the Forum in Inglewood. On 18 April, Olivares retained the crown by outpointing over Castillo. However, a rematch between the two fighters took place on 16 October. Castillo cut Olivares in round one, and when it was determined that Olivares could not continue in Round 14, Castillo was declared winner by a technical knockout, winning the world bantamweight championship. After one non-title win, Castillo met Olivares for a third time on 3 April 1971, when Olivares recovered the crown by outpointing Castillo despite suffering an early knockdown.

==== Later in career ====
Castillo went on fighting until 1975, but his record from the third Olivares fight until his retirement was a rather ordinary one of 5 wins and 7 losses. He lost to former or future world champions Enrique Pinder, Bobby Chacon, and Danny "Little Red" Lopez. After losing to Ernesto Herrera on 12 December 1975, he retired.

== Professional boxing record ==
66 fights	47 wins	17 losses
By knockout	23	6
By decision	23	11
By disqualification	1	0
Draws	2	

No.	Result	Record	Opponent	Type	Round, time	Date	Location	Notes
66	Loss	47–17–2	Ernesto Herrera	PTS	10 (10)	1975-12-12	Laredo, Texas, U.S.	
65	Loss	47–16–2	Danny Lopez	TKO	2 (10)	1975-04-24	Olympic Auditorium, Los Angeles, California, U.S.	
64	Win	47–15–2	Rafael Ortega	UD	10 (10)	1974-09-14	Arena México, Mexico City, Mexico	
63	Loss	46–15–2	Vicente Blanco	PTS	10 (10)	1974-06-22	Estadio Metropolitano, León, Nicaragua	
62	Win	46–14–2	Victor Rodrigo	PTS	10 (10)	1974-05-14	Ciudad Juárez, Mexico	
61	Loss	45–14–2	Bobby Chacon	TKO	10 (10)	1973-04-28	Great Western Forum, Inglewood, California, U.S.	
60	Loss	45–13–2	José Luis Soto	PTS	10 (10)	1973-03-02	Culiacán, Mexico	
59	Loss	45–12–2	Enrique Pinder	MD	10 (10)	1972-11-14	Great Western Forum, Inglewood, California, U.S.	
58	Win	45–11–2	Earl Large	UD	10 (10)	1972-06-06	Plaza de Toros, Ciudad Juárez, Mexico	
57	Win	44–11–2	Jose Lopez	KO	1 (10)	1972-01-01	Mexico	
56	Loss	43–11–2	Rafael Herrera	SD	12 (12)	1971-08-23	Great Western Forum, Inglewood, California, U.S.	For NABF bantamweight title
55	Win	43–10–2	Earl Large	MD	10 (10)	1971-08-04	Plaza de Toros, Ciudad Juárez, Mexico	
54	Loss	42–10–2	Rubén Olivares	UD	15 (15)	1971-04-02	Great Western Forum, Inglewood, California, U.S.	Lost WBA, WBC & The Ring bantamweight titles
53	Win	42–9–2	Felipe Ursua	TKO	6 (10)	1971-02-28	Monterrey, Mexico	
52	Win	41–9–2	Rubén Olivares	TKO	14 (15)	1970-10-16	Great Western Forum, Inglewood, California, U.S.	Won WBA, WBC & The Ring bantamweight titles
51	Win	40–9–2	Rogelio Lara	UD	12 (12)	1970-08-14	Great Western Forum, Inglewood, California, U.S.	Won NABF bantamweight title
50	Loss	39–9–2	Rubén Olivares	UD	15 (15)	1970-04-18	Great Western Forum, Inglewood, California, U.S.	For WBA, WBC & The Ring bantamweight titles
49	Win	39–8–2	Raul Cruz	UD	10 (10)	1969-12-12	Great Western Forum, Inglewood, California, U.S.	
48	Loss	38–8–2	Raul Cruz	MD	12 (12)	1969-10-17	Great Western Forum, Inglewood, California, U.S.	
47	Draw	38–7–2	José Medel	PTS	12 (12)	1969-09-30	Plaza de Toros, Ciudad Juárez, Mexico	Retained Mexican bantamweight title
46	Win	38–7–1	Alberto Jangalay	TKO	5 (?)	1969-07-26	Arena México, Mexico City, Mexico	
45	Win	37–7–1	Ernie Cruz	KO	5 (10)	1969-06-29	Plaza de Toros México, Mexico City, Mexico	
44	Win	36–7–1	Seiichi Watanuki	KO	4 (10)	1969-06-10	Plaza de Toros, Ciudad Juárez, Mexico	
43	Draw	35–7–1	Ushiwakamaru Harada	MD	10 (10)	1969-04-16	Japan	
42	Win	35–7	Rafael Herrera	TKO	3 (12)	1969-02-15	Plaza de Toros Monumental, Monterrey, Mexico	Retained Mexican bantamweight title
41	Loss	34–7	Lionel Rose	SD	15 (15)	1968-12-06	Great Western Forum, Inglewood, California, U.S.	For WBA, WBC & The Ring bantamweight titles
40	Win	34–6	Evan Armstrong	TKO	2 (10)	1968-08-28	Great Western Forum, Inglewood, California, U.S.	
39	Win	33–6	Jesús Pimentel	UD	12 (12)	1968-06-14	Great Western Forum, Inglewood, California, U.S.	
38	Win	32–6	Guillermo Tellez	TKO	11 (12)	1968-05-14	Plaza de Toros, Ciudad Juárez, Mexico	Retained Mexican bantamweight title
37	Win	31–6	Yoshio Nakane	UD	12 (12)	1968-03-31	Plaza de Toros, Ciudad Juárez, Mexico	
36	Win	30–6	Jose Valdez	PTS	10 (10)	1968-03-06	León, Mexico	
35	Win	29–6	Miguel Castro	TKO	6 (12)	1967-11-26	Plaza de Toros, Ciudad Juárez, Mexico	Retained Mexican bantamweight title
34	Win	28–6	Bernardo Caraballo	RTD	7 (10)	1967-10-14	Estadio Azteca, Mexico City, Mexico	
33	Win	27–6	Pornchai Poprai ngam	KO	5 (10)	1967-08-14	Tijuana, Mexico	
32	Win	26–6	José Medel	UD	12 (12)	1967-04-29	Arena México, Mexico City, Mexico	Won Mexican bantamweight title
31	Win	25–6	Miguel Castro	PTS	10 (10)	1966-12-17	Toreo de Cuatro Caminos, Miguel Hidalgo, Mexico	
30	Win	24–6	Waldomiro Pinto	KO	3 (10)	1966-11-13	Plaza de Toros, Ciudad Juárez, Mexico	
29	Win	23–6	Jerry Stokes	KO	2 (10)	1966-08-27	Mexico City, Mexico	
28	Win	22–6	Edmundo Esparza	TKO	3 (10)	1966-07-27	Plaza de Toros, Ciudad Juárez, Mexico	
27	Loss	21–6	Guillermo Tellez	TKO	6 (10)	1966-06-06	Mexico City, Mexico	
26	Win	21–5	Jesús Hernández	TKO	7 (10)	1966-05-22	Mexico City, Mexico	
25	Loss	20–5	Miguel Castro	TKO	5 (10)	1966-03-19	Mexico City, Mexico	
24	Win	20–4	Lenny Brice	PTS	10 (10)	1965-11-20	Arena Coliseo, Guadalajara, Mexico	
23	Loss	19–4	Guillermo Tellez	TKO	5 (10)	1965-09-25	Arena Coliseo, Mexico City, Mexico	
22	Win	19–3	Jesús Hernández	TKO	6 (10)	1965-08-07	Mexico City, Mexico	
21	Win	18–3	Edmundo Esparza	TKO	2 (10)	1965-06-15	Plaza de Toros, Ciudad Juárez, Mexico	
20	Win	17–3	Daniel Valdez	PTS	10 (10)	1965-03-24	Arena Coliseo, Mexico City, Mexico	
19	Win	16–3	Goyo Sanchez	KO	1 (10)	1965-03-03	Mexico City, Mexico	
18	Win	15–3	Salvador Reyes	PTS	4 (4)	1964-11-25	Arena Puebla, Puebla, Mexico	
17	Loss	14–3	Jose Gonzalez	TD	7 (10)	1964-11-11	Mexico City, Mexico	
16	Loss	14–2	Zorrito Castanon	TKO	10 (10)	1964-10-17	Oaxaca, Mexico	
15	Win	14–1	Adalberto Martinez	TKO	8 (10)	1964-09-30	Mexico City, Mexico	
14	Win	13–1	Genaro Gaytan	PTS	10 (10)	1964-07-08	Mexico City, Mexico	
13	Win	12–1	Emiliano Olvera	PTS	10 (10)	1964-06-13	Mexico City, Mexico	
12	Win	11–1	Jose Gonzalez	TKO	8 (10)	1964-05-23	Mexico City, Mexico	
11	Win	10–1	Samuel Castillo	PTS	8 (8)	1964-03-18	Mexico City, Mexico	
10	Win	9–1	Chucho Cardenas	DQ	3 (8)	1964-01-01	Acapulco, Mexico	
9	Win	8–1	Juan Carlos Villanueva	PTS	8 (8)	1963-11-21	Mexico	
8	Win	7–1	Felipe Silva	PTS	6 (6)	1963-10-20	Mexico City, Mexico	
7	Win	6–1	Catarino Lopez	PTS	6 (6)	1963-09-14	Mexico City, Mexico	
6	Win	5–1	Samuel Castillo	TKO	9 (10)	1963-09-02	Oaxaca, Mexico	
5	Win	4–1	Eduardo Torres	PTS	6 (6)	1963-06-15	Mexico City, Mexico	
4	Win	3–1	Pichon Contreras	KO	10 (10)	1963-03-02	Oaxaca, Mexico	
3	Win	2–1	Zurdo Suarez	PTS	10 (10)	1962-10-20	Oaxaca, Mexico	
2	Win	1–1	Arnulfo Daza	PTS	8 (8)	1962-08-11	Oaxaca, Mexico	
1	Loss	0–1	Carlos Navarrete	PTS	6 (6)	1962-04-25	Mexico City, Mexico	

== Titles in boxing ==
=== Major world titles ===
- WBA bantamweight champion (118 lbs)
- WBC bantamweight champion (118 lbs)

=== The Ring magazine titles ===
- The Ring bantamweight champion (118 lbs)

=== Regional/International titles ===
- NABF bantamweight champion (118 lbs)
- Mexican bantamweight champion (118 lbs)

=== Undisputed titles ===
- Undisputed bantamweight champion

== Death ==
Castillo died at the age of 68 in Mexico City due to complications from a surgery.

== See also ==
- Lineal championship
- List of Mexican boxing world champions
- List of world bantamweight boxing champions

Sporting positions
Regional boxing titles
Preceded by José Medel	Mexican bantamweight champion April 29, 1967 – 1970; Vacated	Vacant Title next held by Alfredo Meneses
New title	NABF bantamweight champion August 14, 1970 – 1970; Vacated	Vacant Title next held by Rafael Herrera
World boxing titles
Preceded by Rubén Olivares	WBA bantamweight champion October 16, 1970 – April 2, 1971	Succeeded by Rubén Olivares
Preceded by Rubén Olivares	WBC bantamweight champion October 16, 1970 – April 2, 1971	Succeeded by Rubén Olivares
Preceded by Rubén Olivares	The Ring bantamweight champion October 16, 1970 – April 2, 1971	Succeeded by Rubén Olivares
Preceded by Rubén Olivares	Undisputed bantamweight champion October 16, 1970 – April 2, 1971	Succeeded by Rubén Olivares
