= List of Mexican boxing world champions =

In Mexico, boxing is considered a major sport. Mexico ranks second worldwide between countries with the most boxing world champions.

== Boxing in Mexico ==
Boxing is a particular means of demonstrating rivalry not only between fans of individual boxers, but also between native-born Mexicans, between Mexicans and people of other nations.

== List of world champions ==
- Note: This list does not include Mexican women world boxing champions such as Jackie Nava.
- M Major Organization
- U Undisputed World Championship
- L Lineal World Championship

This compendium uses the same parameters used by the Mexico Boxing Commission to classify champions. Minor, regular and interim titlists are not included.

Number	Name	Date	Titles	Successful defenses
−	Solly Smith †	October 4, 1897	Featherweight (L & M)	2
1	Battling Shaw †	February 20, 1933	Light welterweight (L & M)	0
2	Baby Arizmendi	August 30, 1934	Featherweight (M)	0
−	Richie Lemos †	July 1, 1941	Featherweight (M)	0
−	Manuel Ortiz †	August 7, 1942	Bantamweight (U, L, M & M)	19
3	Juan Zurita	March 8, 1944	Lightweight (M)	0
4	Lauro Salas	May 14, 1952	Lightweight (U, L, M & M)	0
5	Raúl Macías	March 9, 1955	Bantamweight (M)	2
6	José Becerra	July 8, 1959	Bantamweight (U, L, M & M)	2
7	Sugar Ramos †	March 21, 1963	Featherweight (U, L, M & M)	3
8	Vicente Saldivar	September 26, 1964	Featherweight (U, L, M & M)	7
−	Raul Rojas †	March 28, 1968	Featherweight (M)	0
−	Mando Ramos †	February 18, 1969	Lightweight (M & M)	2
9	Efren Torres	February 23, 1969	Flyweight (L & M)	1
10	José Nápoles †	April 18, 1969	Welterweight (L, M & M)	13
11	Rubén Olivares	August 22, 1969	Bantamweight (U, L, M & M), Featherweight (M & M)	4, 0
12	Chucho Castillo	October 16, 1970	Bantamweight (U, L, M & M)	0
13	Ricardo Arredondo	October 10, 1971	Super featherweight (M)	5
14	Rafael Herrera	March 19, 1972	Bantamweight (U, L, M & M)	2
15	Clemente Sánchez	May 19, 1972	Featherweight (L & M)	0
16	Chango Carmona	September 15, 1972	Lightweight (M)	0
17	Rodolfo González	November 10, 1972	Lightweight (M)	2
18	Romeo Anaya	January 20, 1973	Bantamweight (L & M)	2
−	Bobby Chacon †	September 7, 1974	Featherweight (M), Super featherweight (M)	1, 1 (2)
19	Rodolfo Martínez	December 7, 1974	Bantamweight (M)	4
−	Oscar Albarado	June 4, 1974	Light middleweight (L, M & M)	1
20	Miguel Canto	January 8, 1975	Flyweight (L & M)	14
21	Alfonso Zamora	March 14, 1975	Bantamweight (L & M)	5
22	Carlos Zárate	May 8, 1976	Bantamweight (M)	9
23	Carlos Palomino	June 22, 1976	Welterweight (L & M)	7
24	Pipino Cuevas	July 17, 1976	Welterweight (M)	11
25	Guty Espadas	October 2, 1976	Flyweight (M)	4
−	Danny Lopez †	November 6, 1976	Featherweight (M)	8
26	Freddy Castillo	February 19, 1978	Light flyweight (M), Flyweight (L & M)	0
27	Lupe Pintor	June 3, 1979	Bantamweight (M), Super bantamweight (M)	8, 0
28	Salvador Sánchez	February 2, 1980	Featherweight (L & M)	9
29	Rafael Limón	December 11, 1980	Super featherweight (M)	2
30	Antonio Avelar	May 12, 1981	Flyweight (L & M)	1
31	Pedro Flores	March 8, 1981	Light flyweight (M)	0
32	Juan Herrera	September 26, 1981	Flyweight (M)	1
33	Amado Ursua	February 6, 1982	Light flyweight (M)	0
−	Arturo Frias †	December 5, 1981	Lightweight (M)	0
−	Jaime Garza †	June 15, 1983	Super bantamweight (M)	1
34	Lupe Madera	July 10, 1983	Light flyweight (M)	1
−	Alberto Dávila †	September 1, 1983	Bantamweight (M)	1
−	Richie Sandoval †	April 7, 1984	Bantamweight (L & M)	2
35	Gabriel Bernal	April 9, 1984	Flyweight (L & M)	1
36	Juan Meza	November 3, 1984	Super bantamweight (M)	1
37	Julio César Chávez	September 13, 1984	Super featherweight (M), Lightweight (L, M & M), Light welterweight (L, M & M)	9, 2, 16 (27)
38	José Luis Ramírez	November 3, 1984	Lightweight (M)	2
−	Joey Olivo †	March 29, 1985	Light flyweight (M)	1
39	Daniel Zaragoza	May 4, 1985	Bantamweight (M), Super bantamweight (M)	0, 11
−	Gaby Canizales †	March 10, 1986	Bantamweight (L, M & M)	0
40	Gilberto Román	March 30, 1986	Super flyweight (L & M)	11
−	Steve Cruz †	June 23, 1986	Featherweight (L & M)	0
41	René Arredondo	May 5, 1986	Light welterweight (M)	0
−	Louie Espinoza †	January 16, 1987	Super bantamweight (M), Featherweight (M)	2, 0
42	Lupe Aquino	July 12, 1987	Light middleweight (M)	0
43	Jorge Vaca	October 28, 1987	Welterweight (L & M)	0
44	Juan José Estrada	May 28, 1988	Super bantamweight (M)	2
45	Jorge Páez	August 4, 1988	Featherweight (M & M)	8
−	Orlando Canizales †	July 9, 1988	Bantamweight (M)	15
−	Tony Lopez †	July 23, 1988	Super featherweight (M), Lightweight (M)	5, 1 (6)
46	Raúl Pérez	August 29, 1988	Bantamweight (M), Super bantamweight (M)	6, 0
47	Germán Torres	December 11, 1988	Light flyweight (M)	0
48	Mauricio Aceves	January 20, 1989	Lightweight (M)	1
49	Genaro León	May 6, 1989	Welterweight (M)	0
50	Humberto González	June 25, 1989	Light flyweight (L, M & M)	12
−	Robert Quiroga †	April 21, 1990	Super flyweight (M)	5
51	Marcos Villasana	June 2, 1990	Featherweight (M)	3
−	Michael Carbajal †	July 29, 1990	Light flyweight (M, M & M)	11
−	Loreto Garza †	August 17, 1990	Light welterweight (M)	1
52	Isidro Pérez	August 18, 1990	Flyweight (M)	1
53	Ricardo López	October 25, 1990	Mini flyweight (L, M, M & M), Light flyweight (M)	22, 2 (24)
54	Melchor Cob Castro	March 25, 1991	Light flyweight (M & M)	0
55	Manuel Medina	August 12, 1991	Featherweight (M, M & M)	5
−	Genaro Hernández †	November 22, 1991	Super featherweight (L, M & M)	11
56	José Quirino	February 22, 1992	Super flyweight (M)	0
57	Carlos González	June 29, 1992	Light welterweight (M)	3
58	Miguel Ángel González	August 24, 1992	Lightweight (M)	10
59	Victor Rabanales	September 17, 1992	Bantamweight (M)	1
60	Julio César Borboa	January 16, 1993	Super flyweight (M)	5
61	Gregorio Vargas	April 28, 1993	Featherweight (M)	0
−	Zack Padilla †	July 7, 1993	Light welterweight (M)	4
62	José Luis Bueno	November 13, 1993	Super flyweight (L & M)	0
63	Gabriel Ruelas	February 19, 1994	Super featherweight (M)	2
−	Oscar De La Hoya †	March 5, 1994	Super featherweight (M), Lightweight (M & M), Light welterweight (L & M), Welterweight (L & M), Light middleweight (L, M & M), Middleweight (M)	1, 6, 1, 7, 2, 0 (17)
−	Jesse James Leija †	May 7, 1994	Super featherweight (M)	0
−	Johnny Tapia †	October 24, 1994	Super flyweight (M & M), Bantamweight (M & M), Featherweight (M )	13, 1, 0 (14)
64	Alejandro González	January 7, 1995	Featherweight (M)	2
65	Alberto Jiménez	February 11, 1995	Flyweight (M)	4
66	Marco Antonio Barrera	March 31, 1995	Super bantamweight (M), Featherweight (L & M), Super featherweight (M & M)	13, 2, 4 (19)
−	Danny Romero †	April 22, 1995	Flyweight (M), Super flyweight (M)	0, 2
67	José Luis López	March 13, 1996	Welterweight (M)	1
−	Raúl Márquez †	April 12, 1997	Light middleweight (M)	2
68	Jesús Chong	May 31, 1997	Light flyweight (M)	0
69	Erik Morales	September 6, 1997	Super bantamweight (M & M), Featherweight (M), Super featherweight (M & M), Light welterweight (M)	9, 3, 1, 0 (13)
70	Yori Boy Campas	December 6, 1997	Light middleweight (M)	3
71	Héctor Lizárraga	December 13, 1997	Featherweight (M)	0
72	Enrique Sánchez	February 8, 1998	Super bantamweight (M)	2
−	Roberto García †	March 13, 1998	Super featherweight (M)	2
73	César Bazán	June 13, 1998	Lightweight (M)	2
74	Ruben Sánchez León	August 14, 1998	Flyweight (M)	1
75	Jorge Arce	December 5, 1998	Light flyweight (L, M & M), Super flyweight (M), Super bantamweight (M), Bantamweight (M)	8, 0, 1, 0 (9)
76	Néstor Garza	December 12, 1998	Super bantamweight (M)	3
−	Fernando Vargas †	December 12, 1998	Light middleweight (M & M)	5
77	César Soto	May 15, 1999	Featherweight (M)	0
78	Diego Morales	June 7, 1999	Super flyweight (M)	1
−	Paulie Ayala †	June 26, 1999	Bantamweight (M)	3
79	Isidro García	December 18, 1999	Flyweight (M)	1
80	José Antonio Aguirre	February 11, 2000	Minimumweight (M)	7
81	Guty Espadas Jr.	April 14, 2000	Featherweight (M)	1
82	José Luis Castillo	June 17, 2000	Lightweight (L & M)	5
−	Willie Jorrín †	September 9, 2000	Super bantamweight (M)	2
83	Fernando Montiel	December 15, 2000	Flyweight (M), Super flyweight (M), Bantamweight (M & M)	3, 8, 2 (13)
84	Roberto Carlos Leyva	April 29, 2001	Minimumweight (M)	1
85	Cruz Carbajal	March 15, 2002	Bantamweight (M)	2
86	Antonio Margarito †	March 16, 2002	Welterweight (M, M & M)	7
87	Óscar Larios	November 1, 2002	Super bantamweight (M), Featherweight (M)	7, 1 (8)
88	Juan Manuel Márquez	February 1, 2003	Featherweight (M & M), Super featherweight (M), Lightweight (L, M & M), Junior welterweight (M)	4, 1, 3, 0 (8)
89	Rafael Márquez	February 15, 2003	Bantamweight (M), Super bantamweight (L & M)	7, 0
90	Víctor Burgos	February 15, 2003	Light flyweight (M)	2
91	Alejandro García	March 1, 2003	Light middleweight (M)	1
92	Edgar Cárdenas	May 31, 2003	Minimumweight (M)	0
93	Jesús Chávez	August 15, 2003	Super featherweight (M), Lightweight (M)	0, 0
94	Julio César González	October 18, 2003	Light heavyweight (L & M)	0
95	Javier Jáuregui	November 22, 2003	Lightweight (M)	0
96	Israel Vázquez	March 25, 2004	Super bantamweight (L, M & M)	5
97	Julio Díaz	May 13, 2004	Lightweight (M)	0
−	Juan Díaz †	July 17, 2004	Lightweight (M, M & M)	7
98	Iván Hernández	September 25, 2004	Super flyweight (M)	0
99	Isaac Bustos	December 18, 2004	Minimumweight (M)	0
100	Eric Ortiz	March 11, 2005	Light flyweight (M)	0
101	Martín Castillo	March 19, 2005	Super flyweight (M)	3
102	Hugo Cázares	April 30, 2005	Light flyweight (L & M), Super flyweight (M)	5, 2 (7)
103	Daniel Ponce de León	October 29, 2005	Super bantamweight (M), Featherweight (M)	7, 0
104	Jhonny González	October 29, 2005	Bantamweight (M), Featherweight (M)	2, 6 (8)
105	Ulises Solís	January 7, 2006	Light flyweight (M)	9
106	Rodolfo López	July 30, 2006	Featherweight (M)	0
−	David Díaz †	August 12, 2006	Lightweight (M)	1
−	Robert Guerrero †	September 2, 2006	Featherweight (M), Super featherweight (M)	2, 0
107	Omar Niño Romero	August 10, 2006	Light flyweight (M)	2
108	Édgar Sosa	April 14, 2007	Light flyweight (M)	10
109	Cristian Mijares	January 3, 2007	Super flyweight (M, M & M)	8
−	Steven Luevano †	July 14, 2007	Featherweight (M)	5
−	Sergio Mora †	June 7, 2008	Light middleweight (M)	0
110	Raúl García	June 14, 2008	Minimumweight (M & M)	5
111	Cristóbal Cruz	October 23, 2008	Featherweight (M)	3
112	Humberto Soto	December 20, 2008	Super featherweight (M), Lightweight (M)	3, 4 (7)
113	Giovani Segura	July 25, 2009	Light flyweight (L, M & M)	5
114	Juan Carlos Salgado	October 10, 2009	Super featherweight (M & M)	3
115	Orlando Salido	May 15, 2010	Featherweight (M & M), Super featherweight (M)	2, 0
116	Julio César Miranda	June 12, 2010	Flyweight (M)	3
117	Miguel Vázquez	August 14, 2010	Lightweight (M)	6
118	Tomás Rojas	September 20, 2010	Super flyweight (M)	2
119	Gilberto Keb Baas	November 7, 2010	Light flyweight (M)	1
−	Brandon Ríos †	February 26, 2011	Lightweight (M)	0
120	Hernán Márquez	April 2, 2011	Flyweight (M)	2
121	Canelo Álvarez	March 5, 2011	Light middleweight (M, M & M), Middleweight (L, M, M & M), Light heavyweight (M), Super middleweight (U, L, M, M, M & M)	6, 2, 0, 9 (17)
−	Victor Ortiz †	April 16, 2011	Welterweight (M)	0
122	Ramón García Hirales	April 30, 2011	Light flyweight (M)	0
123	Adrián Hernández	April 30, 2011	Light flyweight (M)	5
124	Julio César Chávez Jr.	June 4, 2011	Middleweight (M)	3
125	Abner Mares	August 13, 2011	Bantamweight (M), Super bantamweight (M), Featherweight (M)	2, 1, 0 (3)
126	Moisés Fuentes	August 27, 2011	Minimumweight (M)	2
127	Rodrigo Guerrero	October 8, 2011	Super flyweight (M)	0
128	Antonio DeMarco	October 15, 2011	Lightweight (M)	2
129	Juan Carlos Sánchez Jr.	February 11, 2012	Super flyweight (M)	2
130	Léo Santa Cruz	June 2, 2012	Bantamweight (M), Super bantamweight (M), Featherweight (M), Super featherweight (M)	3, 4, 4, 0 (11)
131	Mario Rodríguez	September 1, 2012	Minimumweight (M)	0
132	Gamaliel Díaz	October 27, 2012	Super featherweight (M)	0
−	Mikey Garcia †	January 19, 2013	Featherweight (M), Super featherweight (M), Lightweight (M & M), Junior welterweight (L & M)	0, 1, 1, 0 (2)
133	Juan Francisco Estrada	April 6, 2013	Flyweight (M & M), Super flyweight (L, M & M)	5, 3 (8)
134	Victor Terrazas	April 20, 2013	Super bantamweight (M)	0
135	Carlos Amado Molina	September 14, 2013	Light middleweight (M)	0
−	Omar Figueroa Jr. †	January 29, 2014	Lightweight (M)	2
136	Oswaldo Novoa	February 5, 2014	Minimumweight (M)	1
137	Francisco Rodríguez Jr.	March 23, 2014	Minimumweight (M & M)	1
138	Carlos Cuadras	May 31, 2014	Super flyweight (M)	6
139	Javier Mendoza	September 20, 2014	Junior flyweight (M)	1
140	Pedro Guevara	December 30, 2014	Light flyweight (M)	2
141	Julio Ceja	November 1, 2015	Super bantamweight (M)	0
142	Francisco Vargas	November 21, 2015	Super featherweight (M)	1
143	José Argumedo	December 31, 2015	Minimumweight (M)	3
144	Hugo Ruiz	February 27, 2016	Super bantamweight (M)	0
145	Ganigan López	March 3, 2016	Light flyweight (M)	1
−	Jessie Vargas †	March 5, 2016	Welterweight (M)	0
146	Gilberto Ramírez	April 9, 2016	Super middleweight (M), Cruiserweight (M & M)	5, 2
147	Óscar Valdez	July 23, 2016	Featherweight (M), Super featherweight (M)	6, 1 (7)
−	Jessie Magdaleno †	November 5, 2016	Super bantamweight (M)	1
148	Miguel Berchelt	January 28, 2017	Super featherweight (M)	6
149	Rey Vargas	February 25, 2017	Super bantamweight (M), Featherweight (M)	5, 1 (6)
150	Juan Hernández	March 4, 2017	Flyweight (M)	0
151	Luis Nery	August 15, 2017	Bantamweight (M), Super bantamweight (M)	0, 0
−	David Benavidez †	September 8, 2017	Super middleweight (M), Light heavyweight (M), Cruiserweight (M & M)	1, 1, 0
152	Ray Beltrán	February 16, 2018	Lightweight (M)	0
−	José Ramírez †	March 17, 2018	Light welterweight (M & M)	4
153	Jaime Munguía	May 12, 2018	Light middleweight (M), Supper middleweight (M)	5, 0
−	Carlos Licona †	December 1, 2018	Minimumweight (M)	0
154	Emanuel Navarrete	December 8, 2018	Super bantamweight (M), Featherweight (M), Super featherweight (M & M)	5, 3, 4 (12)
−	Danny Roman †	April 26, 2019	Super bantamweight (M & M)	4
−	Andy Ruiz Jr. †	June 1, 2019	Heavyweight (L, M, M & M)	0
155	Elwin Soto	June 21, 2019	Light flyweight (M)	3
156	Julio Cesar Martínez	December 20, 2019	Flyweight (M)	7
−	Joseph Diaz †	January 30, 2020	Super featherweight (M)	0
−	Angelo Leo †	August 1, 2020	Super bantamweight (M), Featherweight (M)	0, 1
−	Brandon Figueroa †	May 15, 2021	Super bantamweight (M), Featherweight (M)	0, 0
−	Jesse Rodriguez †	February 5, 2022	Flyweight (M & M), Super flyweight (M, M & M), Bantamweight (M)	1, 5, 0 (6)
157	Daniel Valladares	July 1, 2022	Minimumweight (M)	1
−	Joshua Franco †	August 11, 2022	Super flyweight (M)	1
158	Luis Alberto Lopez	December 10, 2022	Featherweight (M)	3
159	Mauricio Lara	February 18, 2023	Featherweight (M)	0
160	Alexandro Santiago	July 29, 2023	Bantamweight (M)	0
161	Adrian Curiel	November 4, 2023	Light flyweight (M)	0
162	Rafael Espinoza	December 9, 2023	Featherweight (M)	4
163	Isaac Cruz	March 30, 2024	Super lightweight (M)	0
−	Sebastian Fundora †	March 30, 2024	Light middleweight (M & M)	3
−	Mario Barrios †	June 18, 2024	Welterweight (M)	1
−	Anthony Olascuaga †	July 20, 2024	Flyweight (M)	5
–	José Valenzuela †	August 3, 2024	Super lightweight (M)	0
164	Ángel Ayala	August 9, 2024	Flyweight (M)	0
165	Willibaldo García	May 23, 2025	Super flyweight (M)	0
166	Eduardo Núñez	May 28, 2025	Super featherweight (M)	1
−	Raymond Muratalla †	June 9, 2025	Lightweight (M)	2
−	Ricardo Sandoval †	July 30, 2025	Flyweight (M & M)	0
167	Christan Medina	September 14, 2025	Bantamweight (M)	0
168	José Salas	December 13, 2025	Bantamweight (M)	0
169	Armando Reséndiz	January 1, 2026	Super Middleweight (M)	0
−	Ryan Garcia †	February 21, 2026	Welterweight (M)	0
170	William Zepeda	August 1, 2026	Lightweight (M)	0
171	Sergio Mendoza	October 10, 2026	Flyweight (M & M)	0

† indicates foreigner-born boxer that represents Mexico due to parent's nationality, residence or other circumstances.
† indicates foreign boxer of Mexican heritage that doesn't represent Mexico.
† indicates Mexican-born boxer that represents another nation.

== Current titleholders ==
Name	Organization	Division	Date won
Saul Alvarez	WBC	Super middleweight	October 31,2026
Rafael Espinoza	WBO	Featherweight	December 9, 2023
Christian Medina	WBO	Bantamweight	September 14, 2025
José Salas	IBF	Bantamweight	December 13, 2025
Jaime Munguía	WBA	Super middleweight	May 2, 2026
William Zepeda	WBC	Lightweight	August 1, 2026

== See also ==
- Sport in Mexico
- List of current boxing rankings
- List of current world boxing champions
- List of boxing triple champions
- List of boxing quadruple champions
- List of boxing quintuple champions
- List of boxing sextuple champions
- List of WBA world champions
- List of WBC world champions
- List of IBF world champions
- List of WBO world champions
- List of The Ring world champions
- List of undisputed world boxing champions
- Undisputed championship (boxing)

== Notes ==
=== Men's titlists ===
I:Solly Smith at BoxRec (registration required)
II:Battling Shaw at BoxRec (registration required)
III:Richie Lemos at BoxRec (registration required)
IV:Manuel Ortiz at BoxRec (registration required)
V:Juan Zurita at BoxRec (registration required)
VI:Lauro Salas at BoxRec (registration required)
VII:Raúl Macías at BoxRec (registration required)
VIII:Jose Becerra at BoxRec (registration required)
IX:Vicente Saldivar at BoxRec (registration required)
X:Raul Rojas at BoxRec (registration required)
XI:Mando Ramos at BoxRec (registration required)
XII:Efren Torres at BoxRec (registration required)
XIII:Rubén Olivares at BoxRec (registration required)
XIV:Chucho Castillo at BoxRec (registration required)
XV:Ricardo Arredondo at BoxRec (registration required)
XVI:Rafael Herrera at BoxRec (registration required)
XVII:Clemente Sánchez at BoxRec (registration required)
XVIII:Chango Carmona at BoxRec (registration required)
XIX:Rodolfo González at BoxRec (registration required)
XX:Romeo Anaya at BoxRec (registration required)
XXI:Bobby Chacon at BoxRec (registration required)
XXII:Rodolfo Martínez at BoxRec (registration required)
XXIII:Miguel Canto at BoxRec (registration required)
XXIV:Alfonso Zamora at BoxRec (registration required)
XXV:Carlos Zárate at BoxRec (registration required)
XXVI:Carlos Palomino at BoxRec (registration required)
XXVII:Pipino Cuevas at BoxRec (registration required)
XXVIII:Guty Espadas at BoxRec (registration required)
XXIX:Danny Lopez at BoxRec (registration required)
XXX:Freddy Castillo at BoxRec (registration required)
XXXI:Lupe Pintor at BoxRec (registration required)
XXXII:Salvador Sánchez at BoxRec (registration required)
XXXIII:Rafael Limón at BoxRec (registration required)
XXXIV:Antonio Avelar at BoxRec (registration required)
XXXV:Pedro Flores at BoxRec (registration required)
XXXVI:Juan Herrera at BoxRec (registration required)
XXXVII:Amado Ursua at BoxRec (registration required)
XXXVIII:Jaime Garza at BoxRec (registration required)
XXXIX:Lupe Madera at BoxRec (registration required)
XL:Alberto Davila at BoxRec (registration required)
