= Romeo Anaya =

Mexican boxer (1946–2015)

Personal information
- Nickname: El Lacandón
- Born: Romeo Anaya Malpica; 5 April 1946 Cahuare, Chiapas, Mexico
- Died: 24 December 2015 (aged 69) Tuxtla Gutiérrez, Chiapas
- Height: 5 ft 4 1/2 in (1.64 m)
- Weight: Bantamweight; Super bantamweight

Boxing career

Boxing record
- Total fights: 72
- Wins: 50
- Win by KO: 42
- Losses: 21
- Draws: 1

Romeo Anaya (5 April 1946 – 24 December 2015) was a Mexican professional boxer who competed from 1967 to 1980, holding the Lineal and WBA bantamweight titles from 1973 to 1974.

== Professional career ==
Anaya won the Mexico bantamweight title in 1971. He became the world bantamweight champion when he defeated Lineal and WBA bantamweight champion Enrique Pinder of Panama on January 20, 1973. On November 3, 1973, Anaya met Arnold Taylor in a match refereed by Stanley Christodoulou in Johannesburg. The 14 round fight is considered by many to be one of boxing's classic fights. One South African sportswriter called it "the bloodiest fight in South African boxing history". Taylor suffered a cut and was knocked down once in round five and three times in round eight (the WBA has since adopted a rule where a fighter is automatically declared a knockout loser if he or she is knocked down three times in the same round). Nevertheless, Taylor also cut the champion, and, in round fourteen, he connected with a right hand to Anaya's jaw, sending him to the floor. Feeling that this was his moment to become a world champion, Taylor screamed to his trainers: "He's gone!" from a neutral corner. It took Anaya two minutes to get up, and Taylor won the Lineal and WBA bantamweight titles.

== Professional boxing record ==
72 fights	50 wins	21 losses
By knockout	42	15
By decision	8	6
Draws	1	

No.	Result	Record	Opponent	Type	Round, time	Date	Location	Notes
72	Loss	50–21–1	Benny Argüelles	KO	4 (10)	22 Feb 1980	Coatzacoalcos, Veracruz, Mexico	
71	Loss	50–20–1	Raúl Silva	TKO	4 (10)	20 Dec 1979	Gimnasio Nacional Eddy Cortés, San José, Costa Rica	
70	Win	50–19–1	Carmelo Montes	KO	2	19 Oct 1979	Acapulco, Guerrero, Mexico	
69	Loss	49–19–1	Rubén Valdés	TKO	7 (10)	19 May 1979	Plaza Monumental, Cartagena, Colombia	
68	Win	49–18–1	Al Hernández	KO	6	12 Feb 1979	Saltillo, Coahuila, Mexico	
67	Loss	48–18–1	Torito Meléndez	KO	1	23 Dec 1978	Matamoros, Tamaulipas, Mexico	
66	Loss	48–17–1	Rodolfo Chávez	PTS	10	2 Dec 1978	Culiacán, Sinaloa, Mexico	
65	Win	48–16–1	Bobby Flores	KO	4 (10), 1:02	17 Oct 1978	Sam Houston Coliseum, Houston, Texas, U.S.	
64	Win	47–16–1	Roberto Castillo	KO	3	25 Aug 1978	Nuevo Laredo, Tamaulipas, Mexico	
63	Loss	46–16–1	Sean O'Grady	KO	3 (10), 2:33	15 Apr 1978	Olympic Auditorium, Los Angeles, California, U.S.	
62	Win	46–15–1	Samuel Castillo	KO	3	4 Apr 1978	Veracruz, Veracruz, Mexico	
61	Loss	45–15–1	Fel Clemente	UD	10	2 Mar 1978	Stockton, California, U.S.	
60	Win	45–14–1	Roberto Castillo	KO	3	25 Jan 1978	Guanajuato, Guanajuato, Mexico	
59	Loss	44–14–1	José Ángel Cazares	KO	3	9 Dec 1977	Ciudad Juárez, Chihuahua, Mexico	
58	Loss	44–13–1	Chilango Pacheco	PTS	10	13 Oct 1977	Nuevo Laredo, Tamaulipas, Mexico	
57	Loss	44–12–1	Mike Ayala	TKO	6 (12)	25 Mar 1977	Municipal Auditorium, San Antonio, Texas, U.S.	For NABF super bantamweight title
56	Loss	44–11–1	Mario Castro	TKO	6	17 Dec 1976	Piedras Negras, Coahuila, Mexico	
55	Win	44–10–1	Ramón Guillén	TKO	8 (10)	31 Oct 1976	Nuevo Laredo, Tamaulipas, Mexico	
54	Loss	43–10–1	José Antonio Rosa	SD	10	2 Apr 1976	Shrine Expo Center, Los Angeles, California, U.S.	
53	Loss	43–9–1	Juan Antonio López	PTS	10	12 Mar 1976	Culiacán, Sinaloa, Mexico	
52	Win	43–8–1	Miguel Angel Rivera	KO	6 (10)	27 Sep 1975	Aragon Ballroom, Chicago, Illinois, U.S.	
51	Loss	42–8–1	Arnold Taylor	KO	8 (10)	27 Jun 1975	Ellis Park Tennis Stadium, Johannesburg, South Africa	
50	Win	42–7–1	Marcos Britton	TKO	2 (10)	29 Sep 1974	Auditorio Municipal, Tuxtla Gutiérrez, Mexico	
49	Loss	41–7–1	Rafael Herrera	TKO	6 (15)	25 May 1974	Palacio de los Deportes, Mexico City, Mexico	For WBC bantamweight title
48	Loss	41–6–1	Arnold Taylor	KO	14 (15)	3 Nov 1973	Rand Stadium, Johannesburg, South Africa	Lost WBA and The Ring bantamweight titles
47	Win	41–5–1	Enrique Pinder	KO	3 (15), 3:08	18 Aug 1973	Forum, Inglewood, California, U.S.	Retained WBA and The Ring bantamweight titles
46	Win	40–5–1	Jang Kyu-chul	KO	8 (10)	10 Jul 1973	Plaza de Toros El Toreo, Tijuana, Mexico	
45	Win	39–5–1	Rogelio Lara	SD	15	28 Apr 1973	Forum, Inglewood, California, U.S.	Retained WBA and The Ring bantamweight titles
44	Win	38–5–1	Jorge Torres	PTS	10	10 Mar 1973	Arena Coliseo, Guadalajara, Mexico	
43	Win	37–5–1	Enrique Pinder	KO	3 (15), 2:00	20 Jan 1973	Gimnasio Nuevo Panama, Panama City, Panama	Won WBA and The Ring bantamweight titles
42	Win	36–5–1	Salvador Martínez Carillo	TKO	6 (12)	28 Oct 1972	Auditorio Benito Juárez, Guadalajara, Mexico	Retained Mexican bantamweight title
41	Win	35–5–1	Julio Guerrero	PTS	10	18 Jun 1972	Plaza de Toros San Roque, Tuxtla Gutiérrez, Mexico	
40	Win	34–5–1	Franco Zurlo	UD	10	22 Apr 1972	Forum, Inglewood, California, U.S.	
39	Win	33–5–1	Kazuyoshi Kanazawa	KO	5 (10), 0:46	13 Feb 1972	Plaza de Toros San Roque, Tuxtla Gutiérrez, Mexico	
38	Win	32–5–1	Néstor Jiménez	PTS	10	2 Jan 1972	Plaza de Toros San Roque, Tuxtla Gutiérrez, Mexico	
37	Win	31–5–1	Alfredo Meneses	KO	12 (12)	31 Oct 1971	Plaza de Toros San Roque, Tuxtla Gutiérrez, Mexico	Won Mexican bantamweight title
36	Win	30–5–1	Carlos Mendoza	TKO	7 (10)	4 Sep 1971	Arena Coliseo, Mexico City, Mexico	
35	Loss	29–5–1	Jesús Rocha	TKO	1 (10)	19 Jun 1971	Monterrey, Nuevo León, Mexico	
34	Win	29–4–1	Mario Manrique	TKO	2 (10)	15 May 1971	Mexico City, Distrito Federal, Mexico	
33	Win	28–4–1	Memo Espinosa	PTS	10	9 Apr 1971	Acapulco, Guerrero, Mexico	
32	Win	27–4–1	Francisco Pino	TKO	4 (10)	26 Mar 1971	Acapulco, Guerrero, Mexico	
31	Loss	26–4–1	César Deciga	KO	3 (10)	13 Oct 1970	Frontón Palacio Jai Alai, Tijuana, Mexico	
30	Win	26–3–1	Hiroshi Ishibashi	TKO	1 (10)	23 Sep 1970	Ciudad Obregón, Sonora, Mexico	
29	Win	25–3–1	Alejandro López	TKO	7 (10)	8 Sep 1970	Frontón Palacio Jai Alai, Tijuana, Mexico	
28	Win	24–3–1	Víctor Ríos	TKO	5	18 Aug 1970	Huatabampo, Sonora, Mexico	
27	Loss	23–3–1	Octavio Gómez	TKO	9 (10)	27 Jun 1970	Mexico City, Distrito Federal, Mexico	
26	Win	23–2–1	Armando Villa	KO	1 (10)	19 Mar 1970	Arena Olímpico Laguna, Gómez Palacio, Mexico	
25	Win	22–2–1	Arlindo Borges	TKO	6	28 Feb 1970	Mexico City, Distrito Federal, Mexico	
24	Win	21–2–1	Felipe Ursúa	KO	2 (10)	21 Feb 1970	Mexico City, Distrito Federal, Mexico	
23	Win	20–2–1	Raúl Bolaños	KO	2 (10)	24 Jan 1970	Mexico City, Distrito Federal, Mexico	
22	Win	19–2–1	Ricardo Solís	KO	2 (10)	7 Jan 1970	Mexico City, Distrito Federal, Mexico	
21	Win	18–2–1	Memo Espinosa	KO	1	7 Dec 1969	Tuxtla Gutiérrez Chiapas, Mexico	
20	Win	17–2–1	José Cruz García	TKO	2	11 Oct 1969	Mexico City, Distrito Federal, Mexico	
19	Win	16–2–1	Jaime Pérez	TKO	3	14 Jul 1969	Tuxtla Gutiérrez, Chiapas, Mexico	
18	Win	15–2–1	Guillermo Barrera	KO	2	18 Jun 1969	Mexico City, Distrito Federal, Mexico	
17	Win	14–2–1	Armando Ramírez	TKO	2	21 May 1969	Mexico City, Distrito Federal, Mexico	
16	Win	13–2–1	Javier Coutino	KO	1	29 Mar 1969	Tapachula, Chiapas, Mexico	
15	Win	12–2–1	Jorge Reyes	TKO	2	26 Feb 1969	Mexico City, Distrito Federal, Mexico	
14	Win	11–2–1	Álex Baena	KO	5	18 Jan 1969	Tapachula, Chiapas, Mexico	
13	Win	10–2–1	Dragon Galeana	KO	1	25 Dec 1968	Acapulco, Guerrero, Mexico	
12	Win	9–2–1	Miguel Zacarías	PTS	10	11 Dec 1968	Tapachula, Chiapas, Mexico	
11	Win	8–2–1	Jerónimo Cisneros	PTS	6	30 Nov 1968	Mexico City, Distrito Federal, Mexico	
10	Draw	7–2–1	Tomás Frías	PTS	6	30 Oct 1968	Mexico City, Distrito Federal, Mexico	
9	Win	7–2	Benito Hernandez	TKO	3 (8)	18 Sep 1968	Mexico City, Distrito Federal, Mexico	
8	Win	6–2	Enrique Hernández	KO	4	14 Aug 1968	Mexico City, Distrito Federal, Mexico	
7	Loss	5–2	Álex Baena	KO	6 (10)	6 Nov 1967	Arena México, Tuxtla Gutiérrez, Mexico	
6	Win	5–1	Firpito Flores	TKO	4 (10)	23 Oct 1967	Tuxtla Gutiérrez, Chiapas, Mexico	
5	Loss	4–1	Álex Baena	PTS	10	21 Aug 1967	Tuxtla Gutiérrez, Chiapas, Mexico	
4	Win	4–0	Costeño Peña	KO	6 (10)	31 Jul 1967	Tuxtla Gutiérrez, Chiapas, Mexico	
3	Win	3–0	Battling Comiteco	TKO	5 (10)	17 Jul 1967	Arena México, Tuxtla Gutiérrez, Mexico	
2	Win	2–0	Changuito Ulloa	KO	4 (10)	3 Jul 1967	Auditorio Municipal, Tuxtla Gutiérrez, Mexico	
1	Win	1–0	Campeche Blue	KO	4 (10)	15 May 1967	Arena México, Tuxtla Gutiérrez, Mexico	Anaya fought as a late substitute; Exact date unknown

== See also ==
- List of Mexican boxing world champions
- List of WBA world champions
- List of The Ring world champions
- List of Lineal boxing champions
- List of bantamweight boxing champions

Achievements
Preceded by Enrique Pinder	WBA bantamweight champion January 20, 1973 - November 3, 1973	Succeeded by Arnold Taylor
Preceded by Enrique Pinder	The Ring bantamweight champion January 20, 1973 - November 3, 1973	Succeeded by Arnold Taylor
Preceded by Enrique Pinder	Lineal Bantamweight Champion; January 20, 1973 - November 3, 1973	Succeeded by Arnold Taylor
