= Walter Seeley =

American boxer

Walter Seeley was a professional American Super Featherweight boxer from Sayville, Long Island, New York, born in the June 11, 1941 on Lower East Side of Manhattan. Seeley turned pro on October 29, 1963 by fighting a four round draw with Mike Rosario at Sunnyside Garden Arena in Sunnyside, Queens.

Seeley's professional record was 16 wins no losses and two draws when he met tough Dominican fighter Jose Fernandez on October 8, 1971 at the Felt Forum in New York City. The bout ended in a ten round draw. Two months later on December 10, 1971 at Madison Square Garden Seeley lost for the first time in his career to Jose Fernandez by unanimous decision over ten rounds.

After the loss to Jose Fernandez Seeley ran off three straight wins including an impressive eight round decision over Davey Vasquez at Madison Square Garden on June 26, 1972. This fight was on the undercard of the Ken Buchanan, Roberto Durán Lightweight Championship fight in which Roberto Durán won the title. Seeley followed the Vasquez victory by defeating Jose Fernandez by majority twelve round decision at Madison Square Garden on August 28, 1972. Seeley captured the North American Super Featherweight title with the victory over Jose Fernandez.

Seeley would lose the North American Super Featherweight title on March 9, 1973 to world contender Sammy Goss. Seeley suffered another setback when he traveled to the west coast. On April 28, 1973 Seeley was TKO'd in two rounds by former Champion Rubén Olivares at the Forum in Inglewood, California.

Seeley returned to New York and defeated Eduardo Santiago by ten round decision at the Felt Forum in New York City. On August 27, 1973 Seeley defeated Vilomar Fernandez by ten round decision at the Felt Forum. Vilomar Fernandez is best known for defeating the great champion Alexis Argüello.

On April 2, 1977 at San Antonio, Texas as a semi-final bout of the U.S. Championship Tournament Seeley lost a ten round unanimous decision to then undefeated Ruben Castillo.

Seeley's last professional bout took place on September 30, 1979 at the William Floyd Arena in Shirley, Long Island, New York. He defeated Bobby Huff by TKO in five rounds.

Seeley boxed as a professional for sixteen years and fought many world contenders and was ranked in the top ten of the Super Featherweight division for a few years. He finished his career with thirty wins, five losses and three draws.

Seeley went on to train boxers at the Franklin Boxing Club in North Carolina, before dying on December 28, 2019, at the age of 78.
