= Enrique Pinder =

Panamanian boxer (1947–2024)

Personal information
- Nickname: La Maravilla ("The Wonder")
- Born: August 7, 1947 Panama City, Panama
- Died: June 15, 2024 (aged 76)
- Height: 5 ft 5 1/2 in (166 cm)
- Weight: Bantamweight

Boxing career
- Stance: Orthodox

Boxing record
- Total fights: 44
- Wins: 35
- Win by KO: 13
- Losses: 7
- Draws: 2

Enrique Pinder (August 7, 1947 – June 15, 2024) was a Panamanian professional boxer who competed from 1966 until 1973. He held the undisputed WBA, WBC, and The Ring bantamweight titles from 1972 to 1973.

== Professional career ==
In 1966, Pinder began his professional career successfully. In late July 1972, he boxed against Rafael Herrera for the WBA, WBC and The Ring Bantamweight championships and won by unanimous judges' decision. He was stipped of the WBC title for not facing mandatory challenger Rodolfo Martínez within six months of winning the title. He lost the WBA title in his first defense to Romeo Anaya of Mexico by knockout. After suffering back-to-back defeats in the same year, Pinder ended his career with a record of 35 wins with 13 knockouts, 7 defeats and 2 draws.

== Professional boxing record ==
44 fights	35 wins	7 losses
By knockout	13	6
By decision	22	1
Draws	2	

No.	Result	Record	Opponent	Type	Round, time	Date	Location	Notes
44	Loss	35–7–2	Francisco Villegas	UD	10	Nov 22, 1973	San Juan, Puerto Rico	
43	Loss	35–6–2	Romeo Anaya	KO	3 (15)	Aug 18, 1973	The Forum, Inglewood, California, U.S.	For WBA and The Ring bantamweight titles
42	Loss	35–5–2	Romeo Anaya	KO	3 (15)	Jan 20, 1973	Gimnasio Nuevo Panama, Panama City, Panama	Lost WBA and The Ring bantamweight titles
41	Win	35–4–2	Chucho Castillo	MD	10	Nov 14, 1972	The Forum, Inglewood, California, U.S.	
40	Win	34–4–2	Rafael Herrera	UD	15	Jul 29, 1972	Gimnasio Nuevo Panama, Panama City, Panama	Won WBA, WBC, and The Ring bantamweight titles
39	Win	33–4–2	Memo Espinosa	UD	10	Apr 22, 1972	Gimnasio Nuevo Panama, Panama City, Panama	
38	Win	32–4–2	Heleno Ferreira	UD	10	Mar 10, 1972	Gimnasio Nuevo Panama, Panama City, Panama	
37	Win	31–4–2	Senen Rios	UD	12	Jan 29, 1972	Gimnasio Nuevo Panama, Panama City, Panama	Retained Panamanian bantamweight title
36	Win	30–4–2	Justo Valdes	UD	10	Dec 18, 1971	Gimnasio Nuevo Panama, Panama City, Panama	
35	Win	29–4–2	David Vasquez	UD	12	Nov 17, 1971	Madison Square Garden, New York City, New York, U.S.	Retained NABF bantamweight title
34	Win	28–4–2	David Vasquez	UD	12	Oct 1, 1971	Felt Forum, New York City, New York, U.S.	Won NABF bantamweight title
33	Win	27–4–2	Carlos Mendoza	TKO	10 (12)	Aug 7, 1971	Gimnasio Neco de la Guardia, Panama City, Panama	Retained Panamanian bantamweight title
32	Win	26–4–2	Angel Sanchez	UD	10	Jun 27, 1971	Gimnasio Neco de la Guardia, Panama City, Panama	
31	Win	25–4–2	Adolfo Osses	UD	12	Apr 24, 1971	Gimnasio Nuevo Panama, Panama City, Panama	Retained Panamanian bantamweight title
30	Loss	24–4–2	Salvador Lozano	RTD	4 (10)	Mar 4, 1971	Gimnasio Nacional Eddy Cortés, San José, Costa Rica	
29	Win	24–3–2	Pablo Vega	UD	10	Dec 5, 1970	Gimnasio Nuevo Panama, Panama City, Panama	
28	Win	23–3–2	Luis Osses	KO	1 (12)	Oct 31, 1970	Gimnasio Nuevo Panama, Panama City, Panama	Retained Panamanian bantamweight title
27	Win	22–3–2	Nestor Jimenez	UD	10	Aug 15, 1970	Arena de Colón, Colón, Panama	
26	Win	21–3–2	Hilario Diaz	UD	10	Jul 19, 1970	Gimnasio Neco de la Guardia, Panama City, Panama	
25	Win	20–3–2	Cammy Beto	UD	12	May 31, 1970	Gimnasio Neco de la Guardia, Panama City, Panama	Won vacant Panamanian bantamweight title
24	Draw	19–3–2	Memo Rodríguez	PTS	10	Mar 20, 1970	Acapulco, Mexico	
23	Win	19–3–1	Victor Rocha	KO	3 (10)	Mar 7, 1970	Monterrey, Mexico	
22	Win	18–3–1	Antonio Munoz	KO	2 (10)	Feb 20, 1970	Acapulco, Mexico	
21	Win	17–3–1	Agustin Cedeno	KO	2 (10)	Jan 31, 1970	Arena de Colón, Colón, Panama	
20	Win	16–3–1	Eugenio Hurtado	TKO	8 (10)	Dec 20, 1969	Arena de Colón, Colón, Panama	
19	Win	15–3–1	Fernando Cuevas	KO	10 (10)	Oct 4, 1969	Arena de Colón, Colón, Panama	
18	Win	14–3–1	Carlos Real	KO	1 (10)	Aug 23, 1969	Arena de Colón, Colón, Panama	
17	Loss	13–3–1	Jose Luis Meza	KO	3 (10)	Jun 15, 1969	Gimnasio Neco de la Guardia, Panama City, Panama	
16	Loss	13–2–1	Orlando Amores	TKO	9 (10)	Apr 20, 1969	Gimnasio Neco de la Guardia, Panama City, Panama	
15	Win	13–1–1	Carlos Mendoza	SD	8	Feb 28, 1969	Arena de Colón, Colón, Panama	
14	Loss	12–1–1	Eugenio Hurtado	KO	3 (12)	Nov 17, 1968	Gimnasio Neco de la Guardia, Panama City, Panama	For Panamanian bantamweight title
13	Win	12–0–1	Carlos Zayas	UD	8	Sep 6, 1968	National Maritime Union Hall, New York City, New York, U.S.	
12	Win	11–0–1	Carlos Cruz	UD	10	Apr 7, 1968	Gimnasio Neco de la Guardia, Panama City, Panama	
11	Win	10–0–1	Felix Archer	UD	8	Feb 18, 1968	Gimnasio Nacional, Panama City, Panama	
10	Win	9–0–1	Arnold Prescott	KO	2 (8)	Feb 10, 1968	Arena de Colón, Colón, Panama	
9	Win	8–0–1	Carlos Real	UD	8	Oct 28, 1967	Estadio Juan Demóstenes Arosemena, Panama City, Panama	
8	Draw	7–0–1	Arnold Prescott	PTS	6	Aug 5, 1967	Arena de Colón, Colón, Panama	
7	Win	7–0	Carlos Real	PTS	6	May 21, 1967	Gimnasio Neco de la Guardia, Panama City, Panama	
6	Win	6–0	Herbert Locke	PTS	6	Mar 19, 1967	Gimnasio Neco de la Guardia, Panama City, Panama	
5	Win	5–0	Herbert Locke	PTS	6	Jan 22, 1967	Gimnasio Neco de la Guardia, Panama City, Panama	
4	Win	4–0	Jim Thousend	TKO	4 (6)	Dec 17, 1966	Gimnasio Neco de la Guardia, Panama City, Panama	
3	Win	3–0	Carlos Melendez	KO	1 (4)	Sep 25, 1966	Arena de Colón, Colón, Panama	
2	Win	2–0	Euclides Escobar	KO	1 (4)	Aug 27, 1966	Panama City, Panama	
1	Win	1–0	Luis Jacobo	KO	1 (4)	Aug 20, 1966	Estadio Juan Demóstenes Arosemena, Panama City, Panama	

== Titles in boxing ==
=== Major world titles ===
- WBA bantamweight champion (118 lbs)
- WBC bantamweight champion (118 lbs)

=== The Ring magazine titles ===
- The Ring bantamweight champion (118 lbs)

=== Regional/International titles ===
- NABF bantamweight champion (118 lbs)
- Panamanian bantamweight champion (118 lbs)

=== Undisputed titles ===
- Undisputed bantamweight champion

== Death ==
Pinder died on June 15, 2024, at the age of 76.

== See also ==
- List of world bantamweight boxing champions

Sporting positions
Regional boxing titles
Vacant Title last held by Ernesto Marcel	Panamanian bantamweight champion May 31, 1970 – July 29, 1972; Won world title	Vacant Title next held by Gilberto Illueca
Preceded by David Vasquez	NABF bantamweight champion October 1, 1971 – July 29, 1972; Won world title	Vacant Title next held by Rodolfo Martínez
World boxing titles
Preceded by Rafael Herrera	WBA bantamweight champion July 29, 1972 – January 20, 1973	Succeeded by Romeo Anaya
Preceded by Rafael Herrera	WBC bantamweight champion July 29, 1972 – January 5, 1973; Stripped	Vacant Title next held by Rafael Herrera
Preceded by Rafael Herrera	The Ring bantamweight champion July 29, 1972 – January 20, 1973	Succeeded by Romeo Anaya
Preceded by Rafael Herrera	Undisputed bantamweight champion July 29, 1972 – January 5, 1973; Titles fragmented	Vacant Title next held by Naoya Inoue
