= Art Hafey =

Canadian boxer

Personal information
- Nicknames: Irish Art; The Toy Tiger
- Nationality: Canadian
- Born: Art Hafey; January 17, 1951 (age 75) New Glasgow, Pictou County, Nova Scotia, Canada
- Height: 5 ft 2 in (157cm)
- Weight: Bantamweight; Featherweight

Boxing career
- Reach: 63 in (160 cm)
- Stance: Orthodox

Boxing record
- Total fights: 66
- Wins: 54
- Win by KO: 36
- Losses: 8
- Draws: 4

Art Hafey (born January 17, 1951) is a Canadian former professional featherweight boxer.

== Early life ==
Art Hafey was born in 1951, in New Glasgow, Pictou County, Nova Scotia, Canada.

== Amateur boxing career ==
Hafey's father set him on the path of amateur boxing when he was just a 12 year-old.

During his amateur career, he claimed the provincial bantamweight championship and posted a perfect 37-0 record, stopping 30 opponents inside the distance.

== Professional career ==
Hafey turned professional in 1968 at 17 years old. His first three professional years saw him stick to local venues in New Glasgow, Fredericton, and Dartmouth, where he built a fight record of 9-3-1.

A majority decision loss to Jackie Burke in 1970 denied Hafey the Canadian bantamweight championship. The following year, he campaigned in Quebec, scoring knockout victories over Paul Tope and Gary McLean while fighting to draws against Jo Jo Jackson and Pierre Deschenes across four bouts in Quebec City.

In 1972, he made the move to San Diego, California, in pursuit of taking his pro career to the next level. He teamed up with former Canadian light heavyweight champion Burke Emery and Suey Welch. Working with them in California, Hafey went 19-0-1, securing 14 wins by knockout. He fought to a five-round draw against Jewel Chappell on August 28, 1972.

He challenged Phil Hudson for the vacant North American Boxing Federation featherweight title in February 1972 in Portland. Despite knocking Hudson down in the first round, he lost by split decision.

At the March 1973 Ali-Norton fight at the San Diego Sports Arena (now Pechanga Arena), both he and his brother appeared on the undercard, with him stopping Valente Vera by knockout in the co-main event.

Hafey's first major bout in California was against Octavio Gomez in May 1973. After being knocked to the canvas twice early in the contest, he recovered to unleash a barrage that opened a deep cut above Gomez's eye, resulting in a stoppage win.

In Monterrey, Mexico, in September 1973, Hafey scored a second-round knockout of former two-time world bantamweight champion Rubén Olivares, who held a record of 72-3-1. When October rolled around, Hafey returned to Canada ranked as the number one contender for the world featherweight title, the 21-year-old fighter weighing 120 pounds. He faced Olivares again in March 1974 for the North American featherweight championship, coming up short on the scorecards in a split decision loss, even though he had dropped Olivares in the final round.

Two months after fighting Olivares, Hafey faced Alexis Argüello in May 1974 in Masaya, Nicaragua. He had earned over $70,000 in 1974 alone and purchased an apartment building as an investment.

He traveled to Caracas in March 1975 and knocked out the former junior lightweight champion of the world, Alfredo Marcano, in round four. In August 1975, he defeated future WBC and Ring featherweight champion Salvador Sánchez in Anaheim. Ring magazine listed Hafey as the number one featherweight contender at the close of 1975.

Two months removed from double hernia surgery in December 1975, Hafey faced Rodolfo Moreno in February 1976 at the Olympic Auditorium. He recovered from an early knockdown to stop Moreno with a knockout in the tenth and final round. During the fight, he sustained serious facial swelling, which his team ignored in favor of celebrating the win. The bout caused a brain hemorrhage and partial vision loss in both eyes, limiting him to three more fights.

His last career fight was against Danny Lopez, who went on to become WBC featherweight champion. He was stopped in the sixth round of the 1976 bout at the Kia Forum.

== Professional boxing record ==
66 fights	54 wins	8 losses
By knockout	36	2
By decision	18	6
Draws	4	

== Personal life ==
Lawrence Hafey, his older brother, had a professional boxing career spanning the 1960s and 1970s.

Hafey was diagnosed with the neuromuscular disease Myotonia congenita.

== Legacy ==
Art Hafey was inducted into the Nova Scotia Sport Hall of Fame in 1980.

Toy Tiger, a 2009 documentary by Bradford Little, explored the life and career of Art Hafey.

Hafey was inducted into the California Boxing Hall of Fame on June 26, 2010.
