= Rubén Olivares =

Mexican boxer

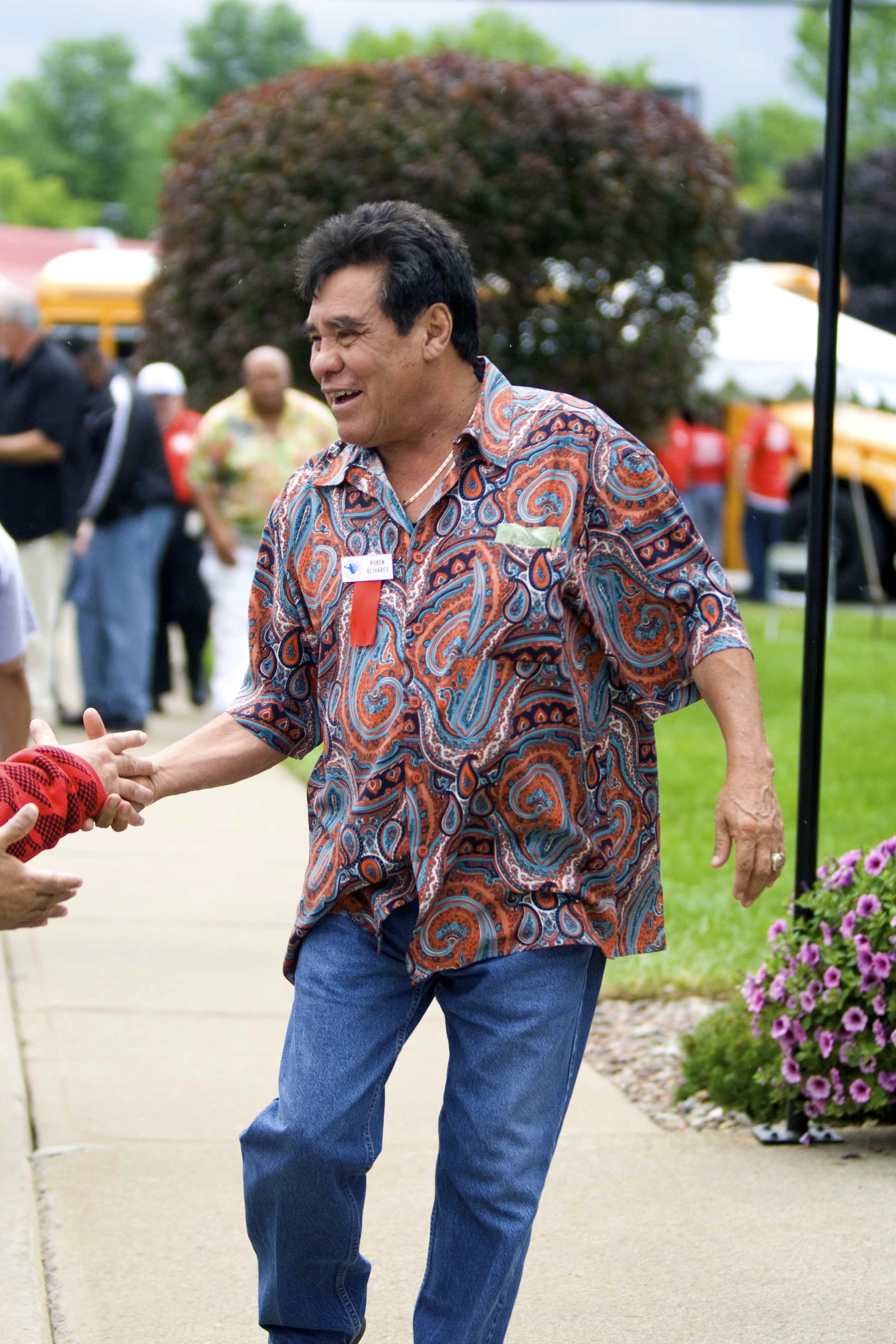
- Olivares pictured in 2010

Personal information
- Nicknames: El Púas; Rockabye; Mr. Knockout
- Born: Rubén Olivares Avila; 14 January 1947 (age 79) Iguala, Guerrero, Mexico
- Height: 5 ft 5 1/2 in (166 cm)
- Weight: Bantamweight; Featherweight

Boxing career
- Reach: 67 in (170 cm)
- Stance: Orthodox

Boxing record
- Total fights: 105
- Wins: 89
- Win by KO: 79
- Losses: 13
- Draws: 3

Rubén Olivares Avila (born January 14, 1947) is a Mexican former professional boxer and a member of the International Boxing Hall of Fame. Olivares was a world champion multiple times, and considered by many as the greatest bantamweight champion of all time. He was very popular among Mexicans, many of whom considered him to be Mexico's greatest fighter for a long period. He held the record for the most wins in unified title bouts in bantamweight history, at 6, a feat later surpassed by Naoya Inoue at 7. Olivares has also had both starring and cameo appearances in Mexican movies, and he participated in more than 100 professional bouts.

== Professional career ==
Olivares made his pro debut at the age of 17 by knocking out Freddy García in round one at Cuernavaca. With that knockout win, a streak of 22 knockout wins in a row had been set off. During that streak, he beat Tony Gallegos, Monito Aguilar and Antonio Leal, among others. It was on March 8, 1967, that Felipe González became the first one to go the distance with Olivares, when Olivares defeated him by a decision in 10 at Mexicali. Then, on July 29 of that same year, Olivares had the first spot on his record, Germán Bastidas holding him to a ten-round draw.

He had back to back rematches with González and Bastidas, knocking González out in round six on November 19, and Bastidas in round four on January 28, 1968. Then came a step up in opponent quality, when he met former world champion Salvatore Burruni in Mexico City. Olivares knocked Burruni out in three rounds. After defeating Manuel Arnal by a disqualification in six, he set off on another knockout win streak, this one reaching 21 in a row. One of the fights in that streak was against Bernabé Fernández, in Los Angeles. Olivares won his first fight abroad that day, beating Fernández in round three. On May 23, 1969, he defeated Olympic gold medalist Takao Sakurai.

=== World Bantamweight Championship ===
After accumulating a record of 51-0-1, Olivares received his first world title bout when he faced world bantamweight champion Lionel Rose, who was defending his world title that day, at the Inglewood Forum. According to boxing book The Ring: Boxing In The 20th Century, the forum's director, fearing a riot like the one that happened after Rose had beaten Chucho Castillo there might happen again, went to Olivares' locker room to express his worries, and Olivares guaranteed he wouldn't let that happen again. Olivares became the world bantamweight champion by knocking Rose out in round five on that day, August 22, 1969.

After beating Alan Rudkin in a title defense and a couple other fighters in non-title bouts, Olivares started his trilogy of bouts with arch-enemy and countryman Castillo. Olivares' knockout streak ended in that fight, but he won the first installment of the Olivares-Castillo rivalry after rising off the canvas to score a 15-round decision. After three more non-title wins, Olivares and Castillo met again, on October 16 of 1970. This time, Olivares suffered a cut in round one, and the fight was stopped in round 14, Castillo the winner and new world Bantamweight champion by a technical knockout. This was Olivares' first loss in his 62 fight career.

After one more win, Olivares and Castillo had their rubber match, on April 3, 1971. Olivares was knocked down once, but he rose to regain the World Bantamweight title in the last fight between him and Castillo with another 15-round decision. Then, he had six more knockouts in a row, including one in a non-title bout in Nicaragua, one in Nagoya, Japan while defending the crown in the rematch for a fight which took place in 1969, won by Olivares by TKO in the 2nd round. The rematch against Kazuyoshi Kanazawa was a brutal affair and in the 13th round Kanazawa seemed to be on the verge of stopping Olivares, having him pinned to the ropes and a corner. It appears Kanazawa emptied his "tank" with this last attack and before the round ended Kanazawa could hardly keep his feet, and fell clumsily after missing with an uppercut. Olivares floored Kanazawa three times in the 14th round, prompting the stoppage victory. This fight was voted as the best Japanese match of 1971. Another victory came against former champion Efren Torres, and one against Jesus Pimentel, also in round 11.

On March 19, 1972, Olivares lost the world's Bantamweight title to another countryman, Rafael Herrera, by a knockout in round eight. After defeating Godfrey Stevens in Monterrey, he and Herrera met again, with Herrera the winner by a 10-round decision.

==== Move to Featherweight ====
Next for Olivares was a move up in division, and he started to campaign in the Featherweight division by defeating Walter Seeley. On June 23 of 1973, he met future champion Bobby Chacón in the first installment of another trilogy of fights. What was contested for the NABF featherweight title, ended in round nine when Olivares knocked Chacón out. In his next fight, the 78th of his career, he suffered an upset, when unknown Art Hafey knocked him out in five rounds, but then he set off on a string of three more wins in a row, including a decision over Hafey in a rematch, before fighting for the WBA's vacant world Featherweight championship.

=== WBA Featherweight Championship ===
On July 9, 1974, Olivares became world Featherweight champion by beating Zenzuke Utagawa by a knockout in round seven. After two non-title wins, he met Alexis Argüello on November 23 of that year, losing the world title by a knockout in round 13. He was winning this fight before he gassed and was eventually stopped.

=== WBC Featherweight Championship ===
One more win, and Olivares met Chacón in the second installment of their trilogy, this time with Chacón as the WBC's world Featherweight champion. Olivares won the fight by a knockout in round two, to become world champion for the fourth time. This time, however, he also lost the title in his first defense, beaten by Ghana's David "Poison" Kotey, who became that nation's first world boxing champion ever by winning a 15-round decision against Olivares. A seven-round knockout defeat at the hands of future world champion Danny "Little Red" López followed.

Olivares won two fights in 1976 and lost one, including a victory over world title challenger Fernando Cabanela of the Philippines and a loss to another world title challenger, José Cervantes, from Colombia. In 1977, Olivares and Chacón boxed the final bout of their trilogy, and this time Chacón came out the winner, by a 10-round decision. But in 1978, Olivares found what would be the beginning of his last hurrah in his 93rd bout, as he knocked out the future 2 time world Lightweight champion José Luis Ramírez in two rounds at Ciudad Obregón, and he followed that win with wins over Shig Fukuyama and Isaac Vega.

After drawing in ten rounds with Guillermo Morales on April 22, 1979, he received what would turn out to be his last world title try: On July 21 of that year, he was knocked out in 12 rounds by WBA world Featherweight champion Eusebio Pedroza in Houston, Texas.

For the next eight years, he fought sporadically and with mixed success, until he was able to walk away from professional boxing in 1988.

== Professional boxing record ==
105 fights	89 wins	13 losses
By knockout	79	9
By decision	9	4
By disqualification	1	0
Draws	3	

No.	Result	Record	Opponent	Type	Round, time	Date	Location	Notes
105	Loss	89–13–3	Ignacio Madrid	KO	4 (10)	1988-03-12	Arena México, Mexico City, Mexico	
104	Draw	89–12–3	Roman Almaguer	MD	4	1986-02-25	The Forum, Inglewood, California, U.S.	
103	Loss	89–12–2	Margarito Marquez	SD	10	1981-11-24	La Villa Real Convention Center, McAllen, Texas, U.S.	
102	Loss	89–11–2	Rafael Gandarilla	TKO	8 (10)	1980-08-24	Sam Houston Coliseum, Houston, Texas, U.S.	
101	Win	89–10–2	Sergio Reyes	TKO	7 (10)	1980-04-25	Ciudad Deportiva, Nuevo Laredo, Tamaulipas, Mexico	
100	Win	88–10–2	Carlos Serrano	TKO	5 (10)	1980-03-07	Uptown Theatre, Chicago, Illinois, U.S.	
99	Loss	87–10–2	Eusebio Pedroza	TKO	12 (15)	1979-07-21	Sam Houston Coliseum, Houston, Texas, U.S.	For WBA featherweight title
98	Win	87–9–2	Adrian Zapanta	TKO	2 (10)	1979-06-30	Tingley Coliseum, Albuquerque, New Mexico, U.S.	
97	Draw	86–9–2	Guillermo Morales	PTS	10	1979-04-22	Plaza de Toros San Roque, Tuxtla Gutiérrez, Chiapas, Mexico	
96	Win	86–9–1	Isaac Vega	RTD	2 (10)	1978-11-20	Sam Houston Coliseum, Houston, Texas, U.S.	
95	Win	85–9–1	Shig Fukuyama	KO	2 (10)	1978-10-17	Sam Houston Coliseum, Houston, Texas, U.S.	
94	Win	84–9–1	José Luis Ramírez	TKO	2 (10)	1978-04-28	Arena, Ciudad Obregón, Sonora, Mexico	
93	Win	83–9–1	Ricky Gutierrez	UD	10	1977-12-06	Municipal Auditorium, San Antonio, Texas, U.S.	
92	Loss	82–9–1	Bobby Chacon	UD	10	1977-08-20	The Forum, Inglewood, California, U.S.	
91	Loss	82–8–1	Jose Cervantes	KO	6 (12)	1976-11-19	Sports Arena, Los Angeles, California, U.S.	
90	Win	82–7–1	Fernando Cabanela	UD	10	1976-07-30	Sports Arena, Los Angeles, California, U.S.	
89	Win	81–7–1	Pajet Lupikanet	TKO	1 (10)	1976-06-02	Sports Arena, Los Angeles, California, U.S.	
88	Loss	80–7–1	Danny Lopez	KO	7 (10)	1975-12-04	The Forum, Inglewood, California, U.S.	
87	Loss	80–6–1	David Kotey	SD	15	1975-09-20	The Forum, Inglewood, California, U.S.	Lost WBC featherweight title
86	Win	80–5–1	Bobby Chacon	TKO	2 (15)	1975-06-20	The Forum, Inglewood, California, U.S.	Won WBC featherweight title
85	Win	79–5–1	Benjamin Ortiz	KO	6 (10)	1975-04-07	Arena Tijuana 72, Tijuana, Baja California, Mexico	
84	Loss	78–5–1	Alexis Arguello	KO	13 (15)	1974-11-23	The Forum, Inglewood, California, U.S.	Lost WBA featherweight title
83	Win	78–4–1	Carlos Mendoza	TKO	6 (10)	1974-10-05	Plaza de Toros, Ciudad Juárez, Chihuahua, Mexico	
82	Win	77–4–1	Enrique Garcia	TKO	5 (10)	1974-08-31	Plaza de Toros Monumental, Monterrey, Nuevo León, Mexico	
81	Win	76–4–1	Zensuke Utagawa	KO	7 (15)	1974-07-09	The Forum, Inglewood, California, U.S.	Won vacant WBA featherweight title
80	Win	75–4–1	Adrian Zapanta	KO	2 (10)	1974-05-14	Ciudad Juárez, Chihuahua, Mexico	
79	Win	74–4–1	Art Hafey	SD	12	1974-03-04	The Forum, Inglewood, California, U.S.	
78	Win	73–4–1	Francisco Durango	UD	10	1973-12-02	Plaza de Toros Monumental, Matamoros, Tamaulipas, Mexico	
77	Loss	72–4–1	Art Hafey	KO	5 (10)	1973-09-15	Plaza de Toros Monumental, Monterrey, Nuevo León, Mexico	
76	Win	72–3–1	Bobby Chacon	RTD	9 (12)	1973-06-23	The Forum, Inglewood, California, U.S.	Won NABF featherweight title
75	Win	71–3–1	Walter Seeley	TKO	2 (10)	1973-04-28	The Forum, Inglewood, California, U.S.	
74	Loss	70–3–1	Rafael Herrera	MD	10	1972-11-14	The Forum, Inglewood, California, U.S.	
73	Win	70–2–1	Godfrey Stevens	PTS	10	1972-08-19	Estadio Universitario, Monterrey, Nuevo León, Mexico	
72	Loss	69–2–1	Rafael Herrera	KO	8 (15)	1972-03-19	Toreo de Cuatro Caminos, Mexico City, Mexico	Lost WBA, WBC, and The Ring bantamweight titles
71	Win	69–1–1	Jesús Pimentel	RTD	11 (15)	1971-12-14	The Forum, Inglewood, California, U.S.	Retained WBA, WBC, and The Ring bantamweight titles
70	Win	68–1–1	Kazuyoshi Kanazawa	KO	14 (15)	1971-10-25	Prefectural Gymnasium, Nagoya, Aichi, Japan	Retained WBA, WBC, and The Ring bantamweight titles
69	Win	67–1–1	Kid Pascualito	TKO	9 (10)	1971-08-23	The Forum, Inglewood, California, U.S.	
68	Win	66–1–1	Efren Torres	TKO	4 (10)	1971-07-10	Auditorio del Estado, Guadalajara, Jalisco, Mexico	
67	Win	65–1–1	Vicente Blanco	KO	5 (10)	1971-06-07	Estadio Somoza, Managua, Nicaragua	
66	Win	64–1–1	Tsuguo Mineyama	TKO	3 (10)	1971-05-19	Plaza de Toros El Toreo, Tijuana, Baja California, Mexico	
65	Win	63–1–1	Chucho Castillo	UD	15	1971-04-02	The Forum, Inglewood, California, U.S.	Won WBA, WBC, and The Ring bantamweight titles
64	Win	62–1–1	Chung Park	KO	6 (10)	1971-03-03	Auditorio del Estado, Guadalajara, Jalisco, Mexico	
63	Loss	61–1–1	Chucho Castillo	TKO	14 (15)	1970-10-16	The Forum, Inglewood, California, U.S.	Lost WBA, WBC, and The Ring bantamweight titles
62	Win	61–0–1	Memo Rodriguez	KO	5 (10)	1970-09-11	Acapulco, Guerrero, Mexico	
61	Win	60–0–1	Jose Arranz	TKO	3 (10)	1970-08-14	The Forum, Inglewood, California, U.S.	
60	Win	59–0–1	Shuji Chiyoda	UD	10	1970-07-22	International Amphitheatre, Chicago, Illinois, U.S.	
59	Win	58–0–1	Chucho Castillo	UD	15	1970-04-18	The Forum, Inglewood, California, U.S.	Retained WBA, WBC, and The Ring bantamweight titles
58	Win	57–0–1	Romy Guelas	RTD	5 (10)	1970-03-18	Convention Center Arena, San Antonio, Texas, U.S.	
57	Win	56–0–1	Angel Hernandez	KO	3 (10)	1970-02-22	Acámbaro, Guanajuato, Mexico	
56	Win	55–0–1	Alan Rudkin	TKO	2 (15)	1969-12-12	The Forum, Inglewood, California, U.S.	Retained WBA, WBC, and The Ring bantamweight titles
55	Win	54–0–1	Shigeyoshi Oki	KO	3 (10)	1969-10-27	Ciudad Juárez, Chihuahua, Mexico	
54	Win	53–0–1	Lionel Rose	KO	5 (15)	1969-08-22	The Forum, Inglewood, California, U.S.	Won WBA, WBC, and The Ring bantamweight titles
53	Win	52–0–1	Nene Jun	TKO	1 (10)	1969-06-29	Plaza de Toros México, Mexico City, Mexico	
52	Win	51–0–1	Takao Sakurai	TKO	6 (12)	1969-05-23	The Forum, Inglewood, California, U.S.	
51	Win	50–0–1	Frank Adame	KO	2 (10)	1969-05-06	Heroica Nogales, Sonora, Mexico	
50	Win	49–0–1	Ernie Cruz	TKO	9 (10)	1969-03-17	The Forum, Inglewood, California, U.S.	
49	Win	48–0–1	Carlos Zayas	TKO	7 (10)	1969-03-09	Plaza de Toros San Roque, Tuxtla Gutiérrez, Chiapas, Mexico	
48	Win	47–0–1	Jose Bisbal	KO	3 (10)	1969-02-23	Toreo de Cuatro Caminos, Mexico City, Mexico	
47	Win	46–0–1	Kazuyoshi Kanazawa	TKO	2 (10)	1969-01-26	Toreo de Cuatro Caminos, Mexico City, Mexico	
46	Win	45–0–1	José Medel	KO	8 (10)	1968-11-24	Estadio Universitario, Monterrey, Nuevo León, Mexico	
45	Win	44–0–1	Wally Brooks	KO	1 (10)	1968-10-11	Mexico City, Mexico	
44	Win	43–0–1	Antoine Porcel	KO	1 (10)	1968-09-15	Mexico City, Mexico	
43	Win	42–0–1	Bernabe Fernandez	TKO	3 (10)	1968-08-28	The Forum, Inglewood, California, U.S.	
42	Win	41–0–1	Tiny Palacio	TKO	6 (10)	1968-08-10	Arena México, Mexico City, Mexico	
41	Win	40–0–1	Gary Garber	TKO	5 (10)	1968-07-11	Plaza de Toros, Torreón, Coahuila, Mexico	
40	Win	39–0–1	Enrique Yepes	KO	5 (10)	1968-06-25	Xalapa, Veracruz, Mexico	
39	Win	38–0–1	Octavio Gomez	KO	5 (10)	1968-06-08	Arena México, Mexico City, Mexico	
38	Win	37–0–1	King Gavilan	KO	4 (10)	1968-05-20	Puebla, Puebla, Mexico	
37	Win	36–0–1	Manuel Arnal	DQ	5 (10)	1968-04-27	Arena México, Mexico City, Mexico	
36	Win	35–0–1	Salvatore Burruni	TKO	3 (10)	1968-03-31	Toreo de Cuatro Caminos, Mexico City, Mexico	
35	Win	34–0–1	Pornchai Poprai-ngam	TKO	9 (10)	1968-03-03	Arena, La Paz, Baja California Sur, Mexico	
34	Win	33–0–1	German Bastidas	TKO	5 (10)	1968-01-28	Toreo de Cuatro Caminos, Mexico City, Mexico	
33	Win	32–0–1	Felipe Gonzalez	RTD	6 (10)	1967-11-19	Estadio Arturo C. Nahl, La Paz, Baja California Sur, Mexico	
32	Win	31–0–1	Chamaco Castillo	KO	4 (10)	1967-11-03	Veracruz, Veracruz, Mexico	
31	Win	30–0–1	Ushiwakamaru Harada	TKO	2 (10)	1967-10-14	Estadio Azteca, Mexico City, Mexico	
30	Win	29–0–1	Gustavo Sosa	TKO	3 (10)	1967-09-20	Puebla, Puebla, Mexico	
29	Win	28–0–1	Grillito Aguilar	KO	5 (10)	1967-09-06	Poza Rica, Veracruz, Mexico	
28	Draw	27–0–1	German Bastidas	PTS	10	1967-07-29	Mexico City, Mexico	
27	Win	27–0	Angel Hernandez	KO	5 (10)	1967-07-14	León, Guanajuato, Mexico	
26	Win	26–0	Julio Guerrero	KO	4 (10)	1967-06-17	Mexico City, Mexico	
25	Win	25–0	Felipe Gonzalez	PTS	10	1967-02-26	Gimnasio de Mexicali, Mexicali, Baja California, Mexico	
24	Win	24–0	Antonio Leal	KO	1 (10)	1967-02-05	Gimnasio de Mexicali, Mexicali, Baja California, Mexico	
23	Win	23–0	Daniel Gutierrez	TKO	10 (10)	1966-12-17	Toreo de Cuatro Caminos, Mexico City, Mexico	
22	Win	22–0	Rafael Martinez	TKO	5 (?)	1966-11-09	León, Guanajuato, Mexico	
21	Win	21–0	Rafael Macias	TKO	5 (10)	1966-10-18	Mexico City, Mexico	
20	Win	20–0	Ernesto Aguilar	TKO	3 (10)	1966-10-07	Tampico, Tamaulipas, Mexico	
19	Win	19–0	Ramiro Garcia	KO	9 (10)	1966-09-17	Mexico City, Mexico	
18	Win	18–0	Oscar Rivas	TKO	3 (10)	1966-08-07	Toreo de Cuatro Caminos, Mexico City, Mexico	
17	Win	17–0	Gerardo Lujano	TKO	5 (10)	1966-07-10	Tampico, Tamaulipas, Mexico	
16	Win	16–0	German Guzman	KO	4 (10)	1966-06-24	Tampico, Tamaulipas, Mexico	
15	Win	15–0	Alfonso Jose Cazares	TKO	2 (10)	1966-06-11	Arena Coliseo, Mexico City, Mexico	
14	Win	14–0	Emeterio Campos	TKO	4 (10)	1966-05-20	Auditorio Municipal, Tampico, Tamaulipas, Mexico	
13	Win	13–0	Juan Molina	TKO	2 (10)	1966-04-23	Arena Coliseo, Mexico City, Mexico	
12	Win	12–0	Gallito Camacho	TKO	1 (10)	1966-03-12	Mexico City, Mexico	
11	Win	11–0	Eduardo Alvarado	KO	2 (10)	1966-02-16	Arena Coliseo, Mexico City, Mexico	
10	Win	10–0	Reynaldo De La Cerda	TKO	3 (10)	1966-01-28	Tampico, Tamaulipas, Mexico	
9	Win	9–0	Pablo Martinez	TKO	2 (10)	1965-11-24	Mexico City, Mexico	
8	Win	8–0	Mateo Jaimes	TKO	5 (10)	1965-10-20	Arena Coliseo, Mexico City, Mexico	
7	Win	7–0	Jorge Gomez	TKO	8 (10)	1965-09-09	Plaza de Toros, Torreón, Coahuila, Mexico	
6	Win	6–0	Nemesio Zenil	TKO	2 (8)	1965-08-14	Arena México, Mexico City, Mexico	
5	Win	5–0	Antonio Gallegos	TKO	4 (10)	1965-04-01	Arena Olímpico Laguna, Gómez Palacio, Durango, Mexico	
4	Win	4–0	Torito Silva	KO	6 (10)	1965-02-18	Arena Olímpico Laguna, Gómez Palacio, Durango, Mexico	
3	Win	3–0	Jeronimo Cisneros	TKO	3 (6)	1965-02-01	Mexico City, Mexico	
2	Win	2–0	Freddie Garcia	KO	1 (6)	1965-01-18	Cuernavaca, Morelos, Mexico	
1	Win	1–0	Isidro Sotelo	KO	1 (6)	1965-01-04	Cuernavaca, Morelos, Mexico	

== Titles in boxing ==
=== Major world titles ===
- WBA bantamweight champion (118 lbs) (2×)
- WBC bantamweight champion (118 lbs) (2×)
- WBA featherweight champion (126 lbs)
- WBC featherweight champions (126 lbs)

=== The Ring magazine titles ===
- The Ring bantamweight champion (118 lbs) (2×)

=== Regional/International titles ===
- NABF featherweight champion (126 lbs)

=== Undisputed titles ===
- Undisputed bantamweight champion (2×)

== Legacy ==
Until Julio César Chávez came onto the scene, Olivares was considered Mexico's best boxer. He became a mainstream star, and had friends in the Mexican entertainment world. He frequently performed cameos in comic Mexican films. He remains a Mexican national hero.

Olivares' acting career prolonged for 12 films, including Las Glorias del Gran Puas, a 1984 film based on Olivares' life that also starred an all star Mexican cast including Sasha Montenegro, Carmen Salinas, Manuel "Flaco" Ibáñez, Roberto Guzman, Raul Padilla, Sergio Bustamante and Rafael Inclan among others.

He had a record of 89 wins, 13 losses and 3 draws, with 79 wins by knockout. His knockout winning streaks of 22 and 21 in a row qualify as two of the longest knockout winning streaks in the history of boxing. Similarly, his 78 knockout wins make him a member of an exclusive group of boxers to have won 50 or more fights by knockout. In 2003, The Ring placed him at number twelve in their list of the greatest punchers of all time.

Olivares is a member of the International Boxing Hall of Fame.

Olivares was voted as the #1 bantamweight (along with Carlos Zárate) of the 20th century by the Associated Press in 1999.

== See also ==
- List of Mexican boxing world champions
- List of world bantamweight boxing champions
- List of world featherweight boxing champions

Sporting positions
Regional boxing titles
Vacant Title last held by Phil Hudson	NABF featherweight champion June 23, 1973 – July 9, 1974; Won world title	Vacant Title next held by Ronnie McGarvey
World boxing titles
Preceded by Lionel Rose	WBA bantamweight champion August 22, 1969 – October 16, 1970	Succeeded by Chucho Castillo
Preceded by Lionel Rose	WBC bantamweight champion August 22, 1969 – October 16, 1970	Succeeded by Chucho Castillo
Preceded by Lionel Rose	The Ring bantamweight champion August 22, 1969 – October 16, 1970	Succeeded by Chucho Castillo
Preceded by Lionel Rose	Undisputed bantamweight champion August 22, 1969 – October 16, 1970	Succeeded by Chucho Castillo
Preceded by Chucho Castillo	WBA bantamweight champion April 2, 1971 – March 19, 1972	Succeeded by Rafael Herrera
Preceded by Chucho Castillo	WBC bantamweight champion April 2, 1971 – March 19, 1972	Succeeded by Rafael Herrera
Preceded by Chucho Castillo	The Ring bantamweight champion April 2, 1971 – March 19, 1972	Succeeded by Rafael Herrera
Preceded by Chucho Castillo	Undisputed bantamweight champion April 2, 1971 – March 19, 1972	Succeeded by Rafael Herrera
Vacant Title last held by Ernesto Marcel	WBA featherweight champion July 9, 1974 – November 23, 1974	Succeeded by Alexis Argüello
Preceded by Bobby Chacon	WBC featherweight champion June 20, 1975 – September 20, 1975	Succeeded by David Kotei
