= List of world bantamweight boxing champions =

This is a list of world bantamweight boxing champions, as recognized by the four major sanctioning organizations in boxing:

- The World Boxing Association (WBA), established in 1921 as the National Boxing Association (NBA). The WBA often recognize up to two world champions in a given weight class; Super champion and Regular champion.
- The World Boxing Council (WBC), established in 1963.
- The International Boxing Federation (IBF), established in 1983.
- The World Boxing Organization (WBO), established in 1988.

World titles have been historically recognized by the International Boxing Union (IBU) from 1913-1963 and the New York State Athletic Commission (NYSAC) from 1920 to 1977. Both the IBU and the NYSAC became members of the World Boxing Council.

== World ==
Reign began	Reign ended	Champion	Recognition
Title inaugurated
1890-06-27	1891-abandoned	George Dixon	World
1894-09-15	1899-09-01-retired	Jimmy Barry	World
1899-09-12	1900-abandoned	Terry McGovern	World
1901-03-18	1901-abandoned	Harry Harris	World
1901-11-11	1903-08-13	Harry Forbes	World
1903-08-13	1904-10-17	Frankie Neil	World
1904-10-17	1905-10-vacated	Joe Bowker	World
1905-03-29	1909-01-29	Jimmy Walsh	World
1909-01-29	1909-02-22	Jimmy Reagan	World
1909-02-22	1910-02-22	Monte Attell	World
1910-02-22	1911-02-27	Frankie Conley	World
1911-02-26	1914-06-09	Johnny Coulon	World/NYSAC
1913-06-24	1914-01-31	Eddie Campi	IBU
1914-01-31	1917-01-09	Kid Williams	IBU/NYSAC
Williams lost a title match on 10 Sep 1915 to Johnny Ertle on a foul, but the NYSAC continued to officially recognize Williams as champion while allowing Ertle to claim the title.
1915-09-10	1917-01-09	Johnny Ertle	NYSAC (claim)
1917-01-09	1919-08-15	Pete Herman	NYSAC/World/NYSAC
1920-12-22	1921-07-25	Joe Lynch	NYSAC/World
1921-07-25	1921-09-23	Pete Herman	World
1921-09-23	1922-07-10	Johnny Buff	World
1922-07-10	1923-10-stripped	Joe Lynch	World
Lynch was stripped of his NYSAC title for refusing to face Joe Burman.
1923-10	1924-03-21	Joe Lynch	NBA
1923-10	1923-10-19	Joe Burman	NYSAC
1923-10-19	1924-12-19	Abe Goldstein	NYSAC/World
1924-12-19	1925-03-20	Eddie 'Cannonball' Martin	World
1925-03-20	1927-02-04-stripped	Charlie Phil Rosenberg	World/NYSAC
Rosenberg was stripped of his NBA title on 18 Oct 1926 for failing to fight Bud Taylor and then his NYSAC title on 4 Feb 1927 for missing weight in a title bout.
1926-10-18	1928-05-18-vacated	Bud Taylor	NBA
1928-05-23	1929-10-08-stripped	Bushy Graham	World/NBA
1929-06-18	1934-09-18-stripped	Panama Al Brown	NYSAC/World/NYSAC/World/NBA
1935-08-07	1935-08-26	Sixto Escobar	NBA
1935-08-26	1935-11-15	Louis Salica	World
1935-11-15	1937-09-23	Sixto Escobar	World
1937-09-23	1938-02-20	Harry Jeffra	World
1938-02-20	1939-10-27-vacated	Sixto Escobar	World
1939-10-26	1940-09-24	Georgie Pace	NBA
1939-11-17	1942-12-15	Louis Salica	NYSAC/World/NYSAC
1942-08-07	1947-01-06	Manuel Ortiz	NBA/World
1947-01-06	1947-03-11	Harold Dade	World
1947-03-11	1950-05-31	Manuel Ortiz	World
1950-05-31	1952-11-15	Vic Toweel	World
1952-11-15	1954-05-16-retired	Jimmy Carruthers	World/NBA
1954-09-19	1956-06-29	Robert Cohen	World/EBU/NYSAC
Cohen was stripped of the NBA title on 20 Dec 1954 for failing to fight Raúl Macías.
1955-03-09	1957-06-15	Raúl Macías	NBA
1956-06-29	1957-04-01	Mario D'Agata	EBU/NYSAC
1957-04-01	1959-07-08	Alphonse Halimi	EBU/NYSAC/World
1959-07-08	1960-08-30-retired	Jose Becerra	World
1960-11-18	1963-04-04	Eder Jofre	NBA/World

== IBF ==
Reign began	Reign ended	Champion	Recognition
Title inaugurated
1984-04-15	1985-04-26	(Japan) Satoshi Shingaki	IBF
1985-04-26	1987-vacated	(Australia) Jeff Fenech	IBF
1987-05-15	1988-07-09	(United States) Kelvin Seabrooks	IBF
1988-07-09	1994-10-15-vacated	(United States) Orlando Canizales	IBF
1995-01-21	1995-04-29	(Colombia) Harold Mestre	IBF
1995-04-29	1997-07-19	(South Africa) Mbulelo Botile	IBF
1997-07-19	2003-02-15	(United States) Tim Austin	IBF
2003-02-15	2007-03-16-vacated	(Mexico) Rafael Márquez	IBF
2007-07-07	2007-09-27	(Nicaragua) Luis Alberto Pérez	IBF
2007-09-27	2009-10-30	(Ghana) Joseph Agbeko	IBF
2009-10-30	2010-12-11	(Colombia) Yonnhy Perez	IBF
2010-12-11	2011-08-13	(Ghana) Joseph Agbeko	IBF
2011-08-13	2012-02-09-vacated	(Mexico) Abner Mares	IBF
2012-06-02	2013-02-12-vacated	(Mexico) Leo Santa Cruz	IBF
2013-05-11	2013-10-18-stripped	(United Kingdom) Jamie McDonnell	IBF
2013-12-21	2014-06-07	(United Kingdom) Stuart Hall	IBF
2014-06-07	2014-07-02-vacated	(United Kingdom) Paul Butler	IBF
2014-10-25	2015-11-20-stripped	(United States) Randy Caballero	IBF
2015-11-20	2017-06-10	(United Kingdom) Lee Haskins	IBF
2017-06-10	2018-02-18	(United Kingdom) Ryan Burnett	IBF
2018-05-05	2019-05-18	(Puerto Rico) Emmanuel Rodríguez	IBF
2019-05-18	2023-01-13-vacated	(Japan) Naoya Inoue	IBF
2023-08-12	2024-05-04	(Puerto Rico) Emmanuel Rodríguez	IBF
2024-05-04	2025-06-08	(Japan) Ryosuke Nishida	IBF
2025-06-08	2025-09-18-vacated	(Japan) Junto Nakatani	IBF
2025-12-13	Present	(Mexico) José Salas	IBF

== WBC ==
Reign began	Reign ended	Champion	Recognition
Title inaugurated
1963-04-04	1965-05-18	(Brazil) Eder Jofre	WBC
1965-05-18	1968-02-27	(Japan) Fighting Harada	WBC
1968-02-27	1969-08-22	(Australia) Lionel Rose	WBC
1969-08-22	1970-10-16	(Mexico) Rubén Olivares	WBC
1970-10-16	1971-04-02	(Mexico) Chucho Castillo	WBC
1971-04-02	1972-03-19	(Mexico) Rubén Olivares	WBC
1972-03-19	1972-07-29	(Mexico) Rafael Herrera	WBC
1972-07-29	1973-stripped	(Panama) Enrique Pinder	WBC
1973-04-14	1974-12-07	(Mexico) Rafael Herrera	WBC
1974-12-07	1976-05-08	(Mexico) Rodolfo Martínez	WBC
1976-05-08	1979-06-03	(Mexico) Carlos Zarate	WBC
1979-06-03	1982-06-03-vacated	(Mexico) Lupe Pintor	WBC
1983-09-01	1984-05-26-vacated	(United States) Alberto Davila	WBC
1985-05-04	1985-08-09	(Mexico) Daniel Zaragoza	WBC
1985-08-09	1988-10-29	(Colombia) Miguel Lora	WBC
1988-10-29	1991-02-25	(Mexico) Raúl Pérez	WBC
1991-02-25	1991-09-19	(United States) Greg Richardson	WBC
1991-09-19	1992-09-17	(Japan) Joichiro Tatsuyoshi	WBC
1992-09-17	1993-03-28	(Mexico) Victor Rabanales	WBC
1993-03-28	1993-12-23	(South Korea) Jung-Il Byun	WBC
1993-12-23	1995-07-30	(Japan) Yasuei Yakushiji	WBC
1995-07-30	1997-01-vacated	(Republic of Ireland) Wayne McCullough	WBC
1997-01	1997-11-22	(Thailand) Sirimongkol Singwangcha	WBC
1997-11-22	1998-12-29	(Japan) Joichiro Tatsuyoshi	WBC
1998-12-29	2005-04-16	(Thailand) Veeraphol Sahaprom	WBC
2005-04-16	2010-04-30	(Japan) Hozumi Hasegawa	WBC
2010-04-30	2011-02-19	(Mexico) Fernando Montiel	WBC
2011-02-19	2011-10-vacated	(Philippines) Nonito Donaire	WBC
2011-11-06	2017-08-15	(Japan) Shinsuke Yamanaka	WBC
2017-08-15	2018-02-28-stripped	(Mexico) Luis Nery	WBC
2019-01-19	2021-05-29	(France) Nordine Oubaali	WBC
2021-05-29	2022-06-07	(Philippines) Nonito Donaire	WBC
2022-06-07	2023-01-13-vacated	(Japan) Naoya Inoue	WBC
2023-07-29	2024-02-24	(Mexico) Alexandro Santiago	WBC
2024-02-24	2025-09-18-vacated	(Japan) Junto Nakatani	WBC
2025-11-24	Present	(Japan) Takuma Inoue	WBC

== WBA ==
Reign began	Reign ended	Champion	Recognition
Title inaugurated
1963-04-04	1965-05-18	(Brazil) Eder Jofre	WBA
1965-05-18	1968-02-27	(Japan) Fighting Harada	WBA
1968-02-27	1969-08-22	(Australia) Lionel Rose	WBA
1969-08-22	1970-10-16	(Mexico) Rubén Olivares	WBA
1970-10-16	1971-04-02	(Mexico) Chucho Castillo	WBA
1971-04-02	1972-03-19	(Mexico) Rubén Olivares	WBA
1972-03-19	1972-07-29	(Mexico) Rafael Herrera	WBA
1972-07-29	1973-01-20	(Panama) Enrique Pinder	WBA
1973-01-20	1973-11-03	(Mexico) Romeo Anaya	WBA
1973-11-03	1974-07-03	(South Africa) Arnold Taylor	WBA
1974-07-03	1975-03-14	(South Korea) Soo-Hwan Hong	WBA
1975-03-14	1977-11-19	(Mexico) Alfonso Zamora	WBA
1977-11-19	1980-08-29	(Panama) Jorge Luján	WBA
1980-08-29	1980-11-14	(Puerto Rico) Julian Solís	WBA
1980-11-14	1984-04-07	(United States) Jeff Chandler	WBA
1984-04-07	1986-03-10	(United States) Richie Sandoval	WBA
1986-03-10	1986-06-04	(United States) Gaby Canizales	WBA
1986-06-04	1987-02-03-vacated	(Venezuela) Bernardo Pinango	WBA
1987-03-29	1987-05-24	(Japan) Takuya Muguruma	WBA
1987-05-24	1987-10-04	(South Korea) Chan-yong Park	WBA
1987-10-04	1988-05-09	(Puerto Rico) Wilfredo Vazquez	WBA
1988-05-09	1988-08-14	(Thailand) Khaokor Galaxy	WBA
1988-08-14	1989-07-09	(South Korea) Sung-Kil Moon	WBA
1989-07-09	1989-10-18	(Thailand) Khaokor Galaxy	WBA
1989-10-18	1991-10-19	(Philippines) Luisito Espinosa	WBA
1991-10-19	1992-03-15	(Venezuela) Israel Contreras	WBA
1992-03-15	1992-10-09	(United States) Eddie Cook	WBA
1992-10-09	1993-10-23	(Colombia) Jorge Eliecer Julio	WBA
1993-10-23	1994-04-22	(United States) Junior Jones	WBA
1994-04-22	1994-07-16	(United States) John Michael Johnson	WBA
1994-07-16	1995-09-17	(Thailand) Daorung Chuvatana	WBA
1995-09-17	1996-01-28	(Thailand) Veeraphol Sahaprom	WBA
1996-01-28	1996-10-27	(Ghana) Nana Konadu	WBA
1996-10-27	1997-06-21	(Thailand) Daorung Chuvatana	WBA
1997-06-21	1998-12-05	(Ghana) Nana Konadu	WBA
1998-12-05	1999-06-26	(United States) Johnny Tapia	WBA
1999-06-26	2001-08-07-stripped	(United States) Paulie Ayala	WBA
2001-10-14	2002-04-19	(Venezuela) Eidy Moya	WBA
2002-04-19	2004-10-11-retired	(Denmark) Johnny Bredahl	WBA
2005-02-26	2008-05-31	(Ukraine) Wladimir Sidorenko	WBA
2008-05-31	2010-11-19	(Panama) Anselmo Moreno	WBA
2010-11-19	2014-09-26	(Panama) Anselmo Moreno	WBA Super Champion
2010-12-26	2013-12-06-vacated	(Japan) Koki Kameda	WBA Regular Champion
2014-05-31	2018-05-25	(United Kingdom) Jamie McDonnell	WBA Regular Champion
2014-09-26	2016-06-18	(Dominican Republic) Juan Carlos Payano	WBA Super Champion
2016-06-18	2017-02-10	(United States) Rau'shee Warren	WBA Super Champion
2017-02-10	2017-21-10	(Kazakhstan) Zhanat Zhakiyanov	WBA Super Champion
2017-10-21	2018-11-03	(United Kingdom) Ryan Burnett	WBA Super Champion
2018-05-25	2019-11-07	(Japan) Naoya Inoue	WBA Unified Champion
2018-11-03	2019-11-07	(Philippines) Nonito Donaire	WBA Super Champion
2019-11-07	2023-01-13-vacated	(Japan) Naoya Inoue	WBA Super Champion
2020-02-08	2021-08-14-stripped	(Cuba) Guillermo Rigondeaux	WBA Regular Champion
2023-04-08	2024-10-13	(Japan) Takuma Inoue	WBA World Champion
2024-10-13	2025-05-17-stripped	(Japan) Seiya Tsutsumi	WBA World Champion
2025-05-17	2025-12-01-stripped	(United States) Antonio Vargas	WBA World Champion
2025-12-01	2026-05-31-stripped	(Japan) Seiya Tsutsumi	WBA World Champion
2026-05-31	2026-06-13	(United States) Antonio Vargas	WBA World Champion
2026-06-13	Present	(United States) Jesse Rodriguez	WBA World Champion

== WBO ==
Reign began	Reign ended	Champion	Recognition
Title inaugurated
1989-02-03	1990-09-02-vacated	(Venezuela) Israel Contreras	WBO
1991-03-12	1991-06-30	(United States) Gaby Canizales	WBO
1991-06-30	1992-05-13	(United Kingdom) Duke McKenzie	WBO
1992-05-13	1994-07-30	(Puerto Rico) Rafael del Valle	WBO
1994-07-30	1995-10-21	(Ghana) Alfred Kotey	WBO
1995-10-21	1996-04-26	(Puerto Rico) Daniel Jimenez	WBO
1996-04-26	1996-vacated	(United Kingdom) Robbie Regan	WBO
1997-07-28	2000-01-08	(Colombia) Jorge Julio Rocha	WBO
2000-01-08	2000-05-06-vacated	(United States) Johnny Tapia	WBO
2000-09-04	2002-03-15	(Panama) Mauricio Martínez	WBO
2002-03-15	2004-05-07	(Mexico) Cruz Carbajal	WBO
2004-05-07	2005-10-29	(Thailand) Ratanachai Sor Vorapin	WBO
2005-10-29	2007-08-11	(Mexico) Jhonny González	WBO
2007-08-11	2009-04-25-vacated	(Philippines) Gerry Peñalosa	WBO
2009-04-25	2011-02-19	(Mexico) Fernando Montiel	WBO
2011-02-19	2011-11-vacated	(Philippines) Nonito Donaire	WBO
2011-11-26	2012-08-vacated	(Mexico) Jorge Arce	WBO
2012-10-20	2013-03-02	(Thailand) Pungluang Sor Singyu	WBO
2013-03-02	2013-08-01	(Namibia) Paulus Ambunda	WBO
2013-08-01	2015-04-23	(Japan) Tomoki Kameda	WBO
2015-08-07	2016-07-27	(Thailand) Pungluang Sor Singyu	WBO
2016-07-27	2017-06-22-stripped	(Philippines) Marlon Tapales	WBO
2017-06-26	2019-11-30	(South Africa) Zolani Tete	WBO
2019-11-30	2022-05-03-stripped	(Philippines) John Riel Casimero	WBO
2022-05-03	2022-12-13	(United Kingdom) Paul Butler	WBO
2022-12-13	2023-01-13-vacated	(Japan) Naoya Inoue	WBO
2023-05-13	2024-05-06	(Australia) Jason Moloney	WBO
2024-05-06	2025-09-14	(Japan) Yoshiki Takei	WBO
2025-09-14	Present	(Mexico) Christian Medina	WBO

== See also ==
- List of British world boxing champions
