= Jesús Pimentel =

Mexican boxer (born 1940)

Jesús "Little Poison" Pimentel (born February 17, 1940, in Sayula, Jalisco, Mexico) was a Mexican bantamweight boxer who fought from 1960 to 1971.

== Professional career ==
Pimentel was a fan favorite at the Los Angeles Memorial Coliseum and at The Forum due to his terrific punching power. Pimentel won 77 bouts, 68 by knockout, and lost 7.

Despite his record, Pimentel was denied a chance at the bantamweight title until he was past his prime. His last professional fight was an unsuccessful attempt to wrest the crown from all-time great bantamweight champion Rubén Olivares on December 14, 1971. Despite a valiant effort, Olivares stopped Pimentel on an eleventh round TKO.

== Honors ==
- He was selected to The Ring's list of 100 greatest punchers of all time.
- He was inducted into the World Boxing Hall of Fame.
