= Rafael Herrera =

Mexican boxer

Personal information
- Born: Rafael Herrera Lemus; January 7, 1945 (age 81) Degollado, Jalisco, Mexico
- Height: 5 ft 4 in (163 cm)
- Weight: Bantamweight

Boxing career
- Reach: 65 in (165 cm)
- Stance: Orthodox

Boxing record
- Total fights: 60
- Wins: 47
- Win by KO: 20
- Losses: 9
- Draws: 4

Rafael Herrera (born 7 January 1945) is a Mexican former professional boxer. He won the Undisputed Bantamweight Championship in 1972 and was a two-time WBC bantamweight champion.

== Professional career ==
Herrera turned pro in 1963 and in 1972 defeated Rubén Olivares by TKO to capture the Lineal, WBC and WBA bantamweight titles. He lost the titles in his first defense to Enrique Pinder. Pinder was stripped of the WBC title after this fight for failure to defend against Rodolfo Martinez. Herrera fought Martinez for the vacant WBC bantamweight title the following year and won by TKO, a fight in which Martinez down four times (twice in 4th, twice in 11th), and Herrera was down in the 8th. He defended the title twice before losing it in 1974 in a rematch with Martinez. The outcome of the bout was controversial, as Herrera was on his feet at the count of 7 after being knocked down and was asked by the referee if he could continue. Herrera nodded "yes" but a split second later the referee raised Martinez' hand and declared him the winner. Herrera lurched forward but the referee contained him. The ensuing conversation between Herrera and the referee was heard on the national TV broadcast.

== Professional boxing record ==
60 fights	47 wins	9 losses
By knockout	20	3
By decision	27	6
Draws	4	

No.	Result	Record	Opponent	Type	Round, time	Date	Location	Notes
60	Win	47–9–4	(Mexico) Alfredo Meneses	MD	4	1986-02-25	(United States) The Forum, Inglewood, California, U.S.	
59	Draw	46–9–4	(Colombia) Jose Cervantes	MD	12	1976-05-23	Maestranza Cesar Giron, Maracay, Venezuela	
58	Loss	46–9–3	(Mexico) Jose Luis Soto	UD	10	1975-11-10	Los Mochis, Mexico	
57	Loss	46–8–3	(Mexico) Octavio Gomez	UD	10	1975-07-05	(United States) Olympic Auditorium, Los Angeles, California, U.S.	
56	Loss	46–7–3	(Mexico) Rodolfo Martínez	TKO	4 (15)	1974-12-07	Plaza de Toros, Mérida, Mexico	Lost WBC bantamweight title
55	Win	46–6–3	(Mexico) Romeo Anaya	TKO	6 (15)	1974-05-25	Palacio de los Deportes, Mexico City, Mexico	Retained WBC bantamweight title
54	Win	45–6–3	(Thailand) Venice Borkhorsor	SD	15	1973-10-13	(United States) The Forum, Inglewood, California, U.S.	Retained WBC bantamweight title
53	Win	44–6–3	(Mexico) Rodolfo Martínez	TKO	12 (15)	1973-04-14	Monterrey, Mexico	Won vacant WBC bantamweight title
52	Win	43–6–3	(Mexico) Rubén Olivares	MD	10	1972-11-14	(United States) The Forum, Inglewood, California, U.S.	
51	Loss	42–6–3	(Panama) Enrique Pinder	UD	15	1972-07-29	Gimnasio Nuevo Panama, Panama City, Panama	Lost WBA, WBC, and The Ring bantamweight titles
50	Win	42–5–3	(Mexico) Rubén Olivares	KO	8 (15)	1972-03-19	Toreo de Cuatro Caminos, Mexico City, Mexico	Won WBA, WBC, and The Ring bantamweight titles
49	Win	41–5–3	(Mexico) Chucho Castillo	SD	12	1971-08-23	(United States) The Forum, Inglewood, California, U.S.	Retained NABF bantamweight title
48	Win	40–5–3	(Philippines) Modesto Boy Dayaganon	KO	2 (8)	1971-06-14	Tijuana, Mexico	
47	Win	39–5–3	(Mexico) Cesar Deciga	TKO	10 (10)	1971-04-02	(United States) The Forum, Inglewood, California, U.S.	
46	Win	38–5–3	(Mexico) Rodolfo Martinez	MD	12	1971-01-20	(United States) The Forum, Inglewood, California, U.S.	Won vacant NABF bantamweight title
45	Win	37–5–3	(Mexico) Octavio Gomez	UD	10	1970-09-05	(United States) The Forum, Inglewood, California, U.S.	
44	Win	36–5–3	(Mexico) Jose Lopez	UD	10	1970-04-18	(United States) The Forum, Inglewood, California, U.S.	
43	Win	35–5–3	(Mexico) Cesar Chuy Chavez	TKO	2 (8)	1970-03-17	Tijuana, Mexico	
42	Win	34–5–3	(Japan) Yoshiki Suda	KO	3 (10)	1970-01-20	(United States) Tijuana, Mexico	
41	Win	33–5–3	(United States) Lenny Brice	TKO	3 (10)	1969-09-25	(United States) Olympic Auditorium, Los Angeles, California, U.S.	
40	Loss	32–5–3	(Mexico) Raul Cruz	SD	10	1969-07-26	Arena Mexico, Mexico City, Mexico	
39	Draw	32–4–3	(Canada) Billy McGrandle	SD	10	1969-04-17	Edmonton, Alberta, Canada	
38	Win	32–4–2	(Mexico) Ricardo Solis	TKO	5 (10)	1969-03-29	Plaza de Toros, Torreón, Mexico	
37	Win	31–4–2	(United States) Ken Nagamine	UD	10	1969-03-04	(United States) Valley Music Theatre, Woodland Hills, California, U.S.	
36	Loss	30–4–2	(Mexico) Chucho Castillo	TKO	3 (12)	1969-02-15	Plaza de Toros Monumental, Monterrey, Mexico	For Mexico bantamweight title
35	Win	30–3–2	(United States) Jerry Stokes	UD	10	1968-12-19	(United States) Olympic Auditorium, Los Angeles, California, U.S.	
34	Win	29–3–2	(United States) Lenny Brice	UD	10	1968-11-21	(United States) Olympic Auditorium, Los Angeles, California, U.S.	
33	Win	28–3–2	(Mexico) Guillermo Tellez	TKO	9 (10)	1968-09-28	Arena Coliseo, Mexico City, Mexico	
32	Win	27–3–2	(United States) Ronnie Jones	TKO	3 (10)	1968-08-03	Arena Coliseo, Mexico City, Mexico	
31	Win	26–3–2	(Mexico) Santos Sandoval	TKO	2 (10)	1968-06-29	Arena Coliseo, Mexico City, Mexico	
30	Win	25–3–2	(Mexico) Raul Vega	UD	10	1968-03-30	Arena Mexico, Mexico City, Mexico	
29	Win	24–3–2	(Mexico) Alex Rivera	UD	10	1967-12-05	(United States) Civic Auditorium, San Jose, California, U.S.	
28	Win	23–3–2	(Mexico) Ricardo Solis	KO	5 (10)	1967-10-17	(United States) Civic Auditorium, San Jose, California, U.S.	
27	Draw	22–3–2	(Mexico) Lupe Gonzalez	TD	8 (10)	1967-09-19	(United States) Civic Auditorium, San Jose, California, U.S.	
26	Win	22–3–1	(Mexico) Elias Vargas	UD	10	1967-08-18	(United States) San Bernardino, California, U.S.	
25	Win	21–3–1	(Mexico) Elias Vargas	UD	10	1967-07-06	Arena Mexico, Mexico City, Mexico	
24	Win	20–3–1	(Mexico) Alex Rivera	UD	10	1967-06-05	(United States) Memorial Civic Auditorium, Stockton, California, U.S.	
23	Win	19–3–1	(Mexico) Antonio Perez	UD	10	1967-05-16	(United States) San Jose, California, U.S.	
22	Win	18–3–1	(Mexico) Jose Hernandez	UD	6	1967-04-06	(United States) Olympic Auditorium, Los Angeles, California, U.S.	
21	Win	17–3–1	(Mexico) Manuel Magallanes	UD	6	1967-03-02	(United States) Olympic Auditorium, Los Angeles, California, U.S.	
20	Draw	16–3–1	(Mexico) Gerardo Luna	MD	10	1967-01-21	Arena Coliseo, Mexico City, Mexico	
19	Win	16–3	(Mexico) Alfredo Meneses	UD	10	1966-11-16	Arena Coliseo, Mexico City, Mexico	
18	Win	15–3	(Mexico) Cornelio Vega	UD	10	1966-07-13	Arena Coliseo, Mexico City, Mexico	
17	Win	14–3	(Mexico) Gerardo Luna	UD	10	1966-06-08	Arena Coliseo, Mexico City, Mexico	
16	Win	13–3	(Mexico) Coruco Contreras	KO	10 (10)	1966-01-06	Arena Coliseo, Mexico City, Mexico	
15	Win	12–3	(Mexico) Coruco Contreras	KO	8 (10)	1965-11-08	Tuxtla Gutierrez, Mexico	
14	Win	11–3	(Mexico) Alfredo Meneses	UD	10	1965-10-09	Arena Coliseo, Mexico City, Mexico	
13	Loss	10–3	(Mexico) Gerardo Luna	UD	10	1965-05-01	Arena Coliseo, Mexico City, Mexico	
12	Win	10–2	(Mexico) Rogelio Rea	TKO	4 (8)	1965-04-03	Arena Mexico, Mexico City, Mexico	
11	Win	9–2	(Mexico) Cid Cardenas	UD	8	1965-01-27	Arena Coliseo, Mexico City, Mexico	
10	Win	8–2	(Mexico) Andres Molina	TKO	7 (8)	1964-11-21	Arena Coliseo, Mexico City, Mexico	
9	Win	7–2	(Mexico) Alfonso Izquierdo	UD	6	1964-10-10	Arena Coliseo, Mexico City, Mexico	
8	Win	6–2	(Mexico) Miguel Zamudio	TKO	8 (8)	1964-09-20	Arena Coliseo, Mexico City, Mexico	
7	Win	5–2	(Mexico) Jose Luis Madrid	TKO	2 (6)	1964-08-26	Arena Coliseo, Mexico City, Mexico	
6	Loss	4–2	(Mexico) Jose Luis Madrid	KO	4 (6)	1964-02-07	Poza Rica, Mexico	
5	Loss	4–1	(Mexico) Alfonso Jose Cazares	SD	6	1963-09-21	Arena Mexico, Mexico City, Mexico	
4	Win	4–0	(Mexico) David Monroy	UD	6	1963-07-13	Arena Mexico, Mexico City, Mexico	
3	Win	3–0	(United States) Wenceslao Angeles	UD	4	1963-05-25	Arena Coliseo, Mexico City, Mexico	
2	Win	2–0	(Mexico) Raul Martinez	UD	4	1963-04-17	Arena Coliseo, Mexico City, Mexico	
1	Win	1–0	(Mexico) Memo Gonzalez	UD	4	1963-03-20	Arena Coliseo, Mexico City, Mexico	

== Titles in boxing ==
=== Major world titles ===
- WBA bantamweight champion (118 lbs)
- WBC bantamweight champion (118 lbs) (2×)

=== The Ring magazine titles ===
- The Ring bantamweight champion (118 lbs)

=== Regional/International titles ===
- NABF bantamweight champion (118 lbs)

=== Undisputed titles ===
- Undisputed bantamweight champion

== Personal life ==
Born into a large working-class family, Herrera originally wanted to be a priest. In 1971 he married Leticia, his longtime wife with whom he had two daughters.

== See also ==
- List of Mexican boxing world champions
- List of world bantamweight boxing champions

Sporting positions
Regional boxing titles
Vacant Title last held by Chucho Castillo	NABF bantamweight champion January 20, 1971 – 1971; Vacated	Vacant Title next held by David Vasquez
World boxing titles
Preceded by Rubén Olivares	WBA bantamweight champion March 19, 1972 - July 29, 1972	Succeeded by Enrique Pinder
Preceded by Rubén Olivares	WBC bantamweight champion March 19, 1972 - July 29, 1972	Succeeded by Enrique Pinder
Preceded by Rubén Olivares	The Ring bantamweight champion March 19, 1972 - July 29, 1972	Succeeded by Enrique Pinder
Preceded by Rubén Olivares	Undisputed bantamweight champion March 19, 1972 - July 29, 1972	Succeeded by Enrique Pinder
Vacant Title last held by Enrique Pinder	WBC bantamweight champion April 14, 1973 - December 7, 1974	Succeeded by Rodolfo Martínez
