= Rodolfo Martínez =

Mexican boxer (born 1948)

Personal information
- Nickname: Tepito Monster
- Born: Rodolfo Martínez Estrada; 24 August 1948 (age 78) Tepito, Mexico City
- Height: 1.73 m (5 ft 8 in)
- Weight: Super featherweight Featherweight; Super bantamweight Bantamweight

Boxing career
- Reach: 183 cm (72 in)
- Stance: Orthodox

Boxing record
- Total fights: 52
- Wins: 44
- Win by KO: 35
- Losses: 7
- Draws: 1
- No contests: 0

Rodolfo Martínez Estrada (born 24 August 1948) is a Mexican former professional boxer. He is a former NABF super bantamweight, bantamweight and the WBC bantamweight champion.

== Early life ==
Martínez was born on August 28, 1946, and raised in Tepito, a borough of Mexico City. He is the eldest of six children of Alfonso Martínez and Angelina Estrada.

== Professional career ==
In June 1972, Rodolfo Martínez won his first NABF Championship by Knocking out Octavio Gomez.

=== WBC Bantamweight Championship ===
His first shot at a WBC Bantamweight Championship was on against Rafael Herrera but he would lose by T.K.O. in the twelfth round. On December 7, 1974, Martínez got his revenge and the WBC Bantamweight Championship by Knocking out Rafael Herrera in the fourth round. Rodolfo would go on to make four title defences until he lost to an undefeated Hall of Famer, the Mexican Carlos Zárate.

Preceded by Rafael Herrera	WBC Bantamweight Champion; 7 December 1974– 8 May 1976	Succeeded by Carlos Zárate

== See also ==
- List of Mexican boxing world champions
- List of WBC world champions
- List of bantamweight boxing champions
