= Danny Lopez (boxer) =

American boxer

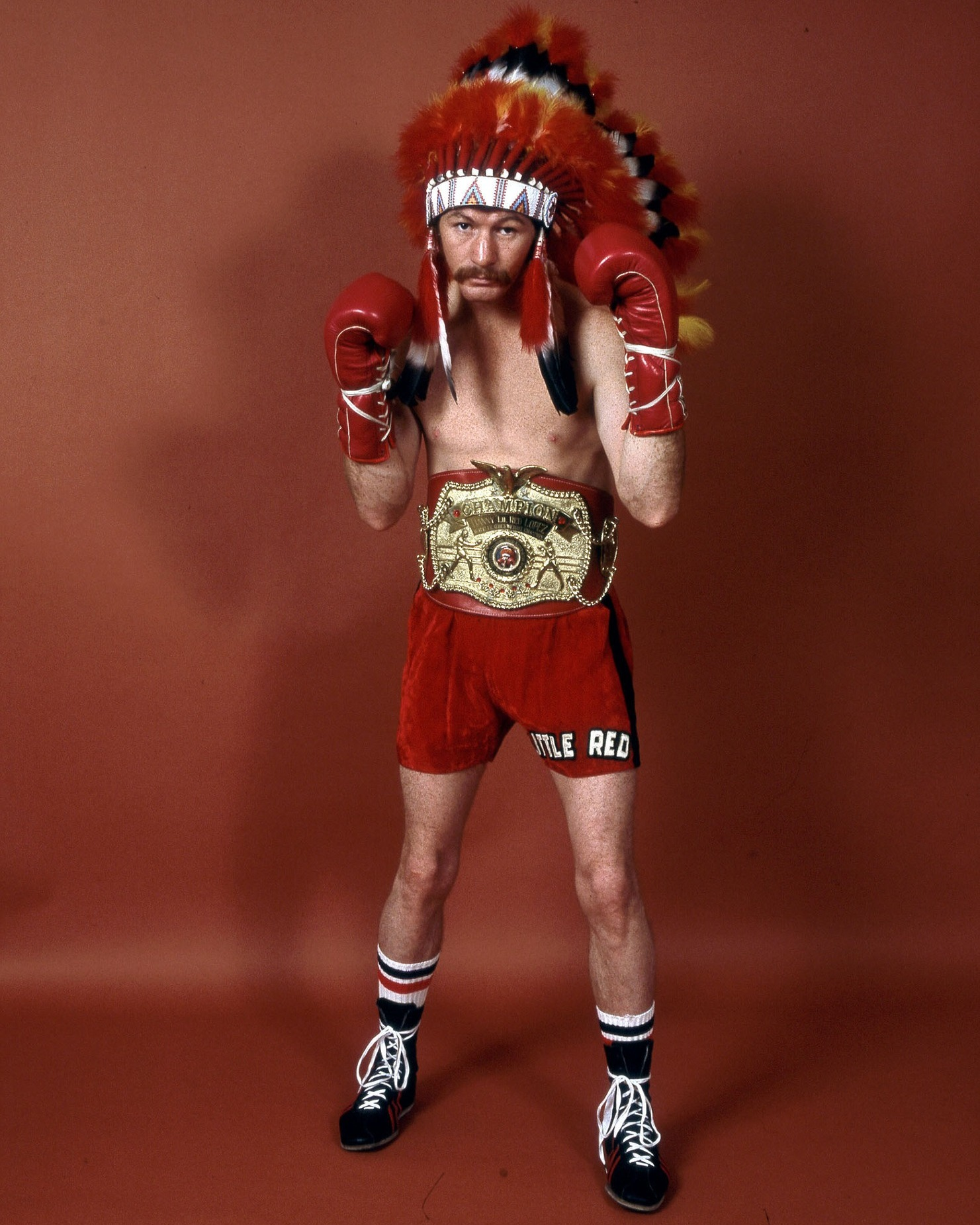
- Lopez c. 1980

Personal information
- Nickname: Little Red
- Born: July 6, 1952 (age 74) Fort Duchesne, Utah, U.S.
- Height: 5 ft 7 1/2 in (171 cm)
- Weight: Featherweight

Boxing career
- Reach: 71 in (180 cm)
- Stance: Orthodox

Boxing record
- Total fights: 48
- Wins: 42
- Win by KO: 39
- Losses: 6

Danny Lopez (born July 6, 1952) is an American former professional boxer who was the WBC featherweight champion of the world from November 1976 to February 1980. His nickname was Little Red.

Known for his tremendous punching power, in 2003 The Ring magazine rated Lopez at number 26 on their list of "100 Greatest Punchers". In 2010, Lopez was inducted into the International Boxing Hall of Fame.

== Background ==
Lopez describes himself as having Native American, Mexican, and European-American heritage. He had been moved from one foster home to another, and coming off the Uintah and Ouray Indian Reservation in Fort Duchesne, Utah, he finally found a home in Southern California. He said that his father was a Mission Indian from Northern California, that his maternal grandmother was three-quarters Ute, and that his maternal grandfather was part Irish. He is also the brother of welterweight contender Ernie Lopez. He is married to Bonnie Lopez and has three sons, Bronson, Jeremy, and Dylan.

== Pro career ==
Lopez began boxing professionally on May 27, 1971, knocking out Steve Flajole in one round at Los Angeles. He won his first 21 fights in a row by knockout, in one of the longest knockout win streaks ever. During that streak, all but one of his fights were in Los Angeles, a fact which could be credited for his popularity in the area. The only one of those 21 fights to be held outside Los Angeles took place in Honolulu, where he beat Ushiwakamaru Harada by knockout in three.

On January 17, 1974, Genzo Kurosawa became the first person to go the distance with Lopez, Lopez winning by a ten-round decision. His next fight, a month later, in Mexicali, Mexico, was his first fight abroad. He beat Memo Rodriguez by a knockout in nine rounds.

People in Los Angeles were eager to see Lopez and another up-and-coming Los Angeleno, Bobby Chacon, square off inside a ring. The fight took place on May 24, and Lopez was knocked out in the ninth round in a thrilling fight. In his next fight of note, he lost once again by a knockout in round nine, this time to Shig Furuyama.

After losing to Octavio Gómez to begin 1975, Lopez went on a roll, beginning with a knockout of Chucho Castillo in two rounds. Two more wins, and he was faced with Rubén Olivares, whom he beat by a knockout in seven rounds, after recovering from a first round knockdown himself.

In 1976, he beat Sean O'Grady by knockout in four, Gómez by knockout in three and Art Hafey by knockout in seven. Finally ranked number one by the WBC, he travelled to Ghana to challenge world Featherweight champion David Kotei in front of an estimated crowd of more than 100,000 Kotei partisans. Lopez became world champion by outpointing Kotei over 15 rounds on November 6. Due to all communication systems having been cut down in Ghana, Lopez could not get his message through to his family. They only learned he was World Champion when they picked him up at the airport one week later.

Lopez won three fights in 1977, retaining the title once, against José Torres by a knockout in round seven.

He and Kotei had a rematch on February 15 of 1978, as part of the undercard where Leon Spinks dethroned Muhammad Ali of the world Heavyweight title. Lopez knocked Kotei out in round six of their rematch, and then he retained the title against Jose DePaula by knockout in round six, and Juan Malvares (on the undercard where Ali regained the title from Spinks) by knockout in two, after recovering from a first round knockdown himself. On October 21, he had a fight with Fel Clemente, against whom he retained the world title with a four-round disqualification in Italy.

By the end of 1978, there was much talk of a "super-fight" against world Jr. Featherweight champion Wilfredo Gómez, but the bout never materialized.

His fight on March 10 of 1979 against Spain's Roberto Castañón in Salt Lake City, not only marked the first time he defended his world title in his home-state, but the first time he fought in his home-state as a professional period. He retained the crown with a two-round knockout. On June 17, 1979, at San Antonio, Lopez defeated Mike Ayala with a thrilling 15th-round knockout and retained his WBC Featherweight title for the seventh time; the exciting bout would be recognized by Ring Magazine as its Fight of the Year for 1979. Lopez went on to defend the title once more that year, knocking out Jose Caba in three rounds.

Lopez's reign as world champion came to an end on February 2, 1980, at the Arizona Veterans Memorial Coliseum in Phoenix. He met Salvador Sánchez that day, and he lost by knockout in round 13 in a one-sided affair. A rematch was fought on June 21, in Las Vegas, and that time around, Lopez was knocked out in the 14th round. He announced his retirement after that fight.

In 1985, he talked about a comeback, but decided to delay until 1992, when he was 40 years old. He lost that bout via TKO.

His record was 42 wins and 6 losses, with 39 wins by knockout.

In June 2010, Lopez and 12 other boxing personalities were inducted in the International Boxing Hall of Fame.

== Professional boxing record ==
48 fights	42 wins	6 losses
By knockout	39	5
By decision	2	1
By disqualification	1	0

No.	Result	Record	Opponent	Type	Round, time	Date	Location	Notes
48	Loss	42–6	Jorge Rodriguez	KO	2 (10), 0:37	Feb 27, 1992	Marriott Hotel, Irvine, California, U.S.	
47	Loss	42–5	Salvador Sánchez	TKO	14 (15), 1:42	Jun 21, 1980	Caesars Palace Sports Pavilion, Paradise, Nevada, U.S.	For WBC and The Ring featherweight titles
46	Loss	42–4	Salvador Sánchez	TKO	13 (15), 0:51	Feb 2, 1980	Veteran's Memorial Coliseum, Phoenix, Arizona, U.S.	Lost WBC and The Ring featherweight titles
45	Win	42–3	Jose Caba	TKO	3 (15), 1:41	Sep 25, 1979	Sports Arena, Los Angeles, California, U.S.	Retained WBC and The Ring featherweight titles
44	Win	41–3	Mike Ayala	KO	15 (15), 1:09	Jun 17, 1979	Convention Center Arena, San Antonio, Texas, U.S.	Retained WBC and The Ring featherweight titles
43	Win	40–3	Roberto Castañón	KO	2 (15), 3:02	Mar 10, 1979	Salt Palace, Salt Lake City, Utah, U.S.	Retained WBC featherweight title; Won vacant The Ring featherweight title
42	Win	39–3	Fel Clemente	DQ	4 (15), 2:15	Oct 21, 1978	Palazzo Dello Sport, Pesaro, Italy	Retained WBC featherweight title
41	Win	38–3	Juan Domingo Malvarez	KO	2 (15), 0:45	Sep 15, 1978	Superdome, New Orleans, Louisiana, U.S.	Retained WBC featherweight title
40	Win	37–3	Jose de Paula	TKO	6 (15), 1:30	Apr 23, 1978	Olympic Auditorium, Los Angeles, California, U.S.	Retained WBC featherweight title
39	Win	36–3	David Kotei	TKO	6 (15), 1:18	Feb 15, 1978	Hilton Hotel, Winchester, Nevada, U.S.	Retained WBC featherweight title
38	Win	35–3	José Torres	RTD	7 (15), 3:00	Sep 13, 1977	Olympic Auditorium, Los Angeles, California, U.S.	Retained WBC featherweight title
37	Win	34–3	Jorge Altamirano	KO	6 (10)	Aug 28, 1977	Sahara Tahoe Hotel, Stateline, Nevada, U.S.	
36	Win	33–3	Jose Olivares	KO	2 (10)	Jul 29, 1977	Coliseum, San Diego, California, U.S.	
35	Win	32–3	David Kotei	UD	15	Nov 6, 1976	Accra Sports Stadium, Accra, Ghana	Won WBC featherweight title
34	Win	31–3	Art Hafey	TKO	7 (12), 0:56	Aug 6, 1976	Forum, Inglewood, California, U.S.	
33	Win	30–3	Octavio Gomez	KO	3 (10), 1:15	Apr 28, 1976	Forum, Inglewood, California, U.S.	
32	Win	29–3	Sean O'Grady	RTD	4 (10), 3:00	Feb 25, 1976	Forum, Inglewood, California, U.S.	
31	Win	28–3	Rubén Olivares	KO	7 (10), 1:59	Dec 4, 1975	Forum, Inglewood, California, U.S.	
30	Win	27–3	Antonio Nava	TKO	6 (10), 2:09	Sep 13, 1975	Olympic Auditorium, Los Angeles, California, U.S.	
29	Win	26–3	Raul Cruz	KO	6 (10), 0:30	Jul 26, 1975	Olympic Auditorium, Los Angeles, California, U.S.	
28	Win	25–3	Chucho Castillo	TKO	2 (10), 3:00	Apr 24, 1975	Olympic Auditorium, Los Angeles, California, U.S.	
27	Loss	24–3	Octavio Gomez	UD	10	Jan 18, 1975	Convention Center, Anaheim, California, U.S.	
26	Loss	24–2	Shig Fukuyama	RTD	8 (10), 3:00	Sep 19, 1974	Olympic Auditorium, Los Angeles, California, U.S.	
25	Win	24–1	Masanao Toyoshima	KO	3 (10), 2:59	Aug 8, 1974	Olympic Auditorium, Los Angeles, California, U.S.	
24	Loss	23–1	Bobby Chacon	TKO	9 (12), 0:48	May 24, 1974	Sports Arena, Los Angeles, California, U.S.	
23	Win	23–0	Memo Rodriguez	TKO	10 (10)	Feb 3, 1974	Gimnasio de Mexicali, Mexicali, Mexico	
22	Win	22–0	Genzo Kurosawa	UD	10	Jan 17, 1974	Olympic Auditorium, Los Angeles, California, U.S.	
21	Win	21–0	Goyo Vargas	KO	1 (10), 2:59	Sep 27, 1973	Olympic Auditorium, Los Angeles, California, U.S.	
20	Win	20–0	Ushiwakamaru Harada	RTD	2 (10), 3:00	Jul 31, 1973	Honolulu International Center, Honolulu, Hawaii, U.S.	
19	Win	19–0	Juan Ordonez	KO	4 (10), 1:44	Jun 21, 1973	Olympic Auditorium, Los Angeles, California, U.S.	
18	Win	18–0	Cesar Ordonez	RTD	6 (10), 3:00	May 10, 1973	Olympic Auditorium, Los Angeles, California, U.S.	
17	Win	17–0	Kenji Endo	TKO	2 (10), 1:26	Mar 17, 1973	Sports Arena, Los Angeles, California, U.S.	
16	Win	16–0	Jorge Carrasco	KO	1 (10), 2:24	Feb 8, 1973	Olympic Auditorium, Los Angeles, California, U.S.	
15	Win	15–0	Jorge Reyes	KO	7 (10), 1:25	Oct 19, 1972	Olympic Auditorium, Los Angeles, California, U.S.	
14	Win	14–0	Yoshinobu Goto	RTD	8 (10), 3:00	Jul 27, 1972	Olympic Auditorium, Los Angeles, California, U.S.	
13	Win	13–0	Benny Rodriguez	KO	1 (10), 2:25	Jul 20, 1972	Olympic Auditorium, Los Angeles, California, U.S.	
12	Win	12–0	Jose Luis Valdovinos	TKO	4 (10)	May 11, 1972	Olympic Auditorium, Los Angeles, California, U.S.	
11	Win	11–0	Arturo Pineda	KO	4 (10), 2:59	Mar 9, 1972	Olympic Auditorium, Los Angeles, California, U.S.	
10	Win	10–0	Rafael Lopez	KO	2 (10)	Feb 18, 1972	Sports Arena, Los Angeles, California, U.S.	
9	Win	9–0	Jose Manuel Orantes	KO	2 (10)	Jan 20, 1972	Olympic Auditorium, Los Angeles, California, U.S.	
8	Win	8–0	Margarito Rios	KO	1 (6)	Nov 18, 1971	Olympic Auditorium, Los Angeles, California, U.S.	
7	Win	7–0	Frankie Granados	KO	2 (6)	Oct 14, 1971	Olympic Auditorium, Los Angeles, California, U.S.	
6	Win	6–0	Rafael Lopez	TKO	5 (8)	Sep 16, 1971	Olympic Auditorium, Los Angeles, California, U.S.	
5	Win	5–0	Modesto Ortiz	KO	4 (6)	Aug 12, 1971	Olympic Auditorium, Los Angeles, California, U.S.	
4	Win	4–0	Jose Luis Estrada	KO	3 (6), 0:35	Jul 29, 1971	Olympic Auditorium, Los Angeles, California, U.S.	
3	Win	3–0	Mauro Olivares	KO	1 (6)	Jul 8, 1971	Olympic Auditorium, Los Angeles, California, U.S.	
2	Win	2–0	Filiberto Castro	KO	1 (6)	Jun 17, 1971	Olympic Auditorium, Los Angeles, California, U.S.	
1	Win	1–0	Steve Flajole	KO	1 (6)	May 27, 1971	Olympic Auditorium, Los Angeles, California, U.S.	Professional debut

== Life After Boxing ==
After his final bout, Lopez was the object of various dedications and was active on the autograph signing circuit. He returned to live in Utah full-time, then moved to Los Angeles, where he worked as a construction worker. Today he lives in Chino Hills, California.

Lopez acted in the 1989 film "Fists of Steel".

== Honors ==
- Inducted into the California Boxing Hall of Fame – 2005
- Inducted into the International Boxing Hall of Fame – 2010

== See also ==
- Notable boxing families
- Lineal championship
- List of world featherweight boxing champions

Sporting positions
World boxing titles
Preceded by David Kotei	WBC featherweight champion November 6, 1976 - February 2, 1980	Succeeded by Salvador Sánchez
Vacant Title last held by Alexis Argüello	The Ring featherweight champion March 10, 1979 - February 2, 1980	Succeeded by Salvador Sánchez
