= Mike Ayala =

American boxer (born 1958)

Personal information
- Nickname: Cyclone
- Nationality: American
- Born: Mike Ayala; January 19, 1958 (age 68) San Antonio, Texas
- Height: 5 ft 6 in (168 cm)
- Weight: Featherweight; Super bantamweight

Boxing career
- Reach: 70 in (178 cm)
- Stance: Orthodox

Boxing record
- Total fights: 51
- Wins: 45
- Win by KO: 23
- Losses: 6
- Draws: 0
- No contests: 0

Mike Ayala (born January 19, 1958) is an American former professional boxer who competed from 1975 to 1991. He is the former NABF super bantamweight and NABF featherweight champion.

== Amateur career ==
Ayala won the 1973 National Golden Gloves flyweight championship and the 1974 National AAU bantamweight championship.

== Professional career ==
=== Championship bouts ===
On June 17, 1979, at San Antonio, Ayala and Danny Lopez fought what boxing book The Ring: Boxing in the 20th Century called one of the best fights of that year. Lopez retained the title with a 15th-round knockout, but the fight was marred by the finding afterwards that Ayala had been fighting under the influence of drugs. Nevertheless, this did not affect the fight's result, but left many to speculate about how the fight would have ended had Ayala not been drugged during it. Ayala himself admitted to have been, in his own words, "loaded" on the day of the fight. This bout was Ring Magazine's Fight of the Year for 1979.

On April 19, 1985 Ayala faced Juan Meza for the WBC super bantamweight title losing by TKO in round 6. In his final title attempt Ayala challenged WBA jr featherweight champion Louie Espinoza losing by KO in the ninth round.

== Personal life ==
Mike is the brother of former boxers Sammy, Paulie, Tony Jr. and the son of trainer Tony Ayala, Sr.

Shortly after his father Tony Ayala Sr.'s death, Ayala's teen son was diagnosed with cancer.

Ayala works as an air conditioner and heating repairman in San Antonio and he owns a local company, Mike Ayala Air Conditioning.

== See also ==
- Notable boxing families
