= The Ring: Boxing the 20th Century =

1993 book by Farhood and Weston

- Language: English
- Subject: Boxing
- Genre: Non-fiction
- Publication date: 1993
- ISBN: 0-7924-5850-8

The Ring: Boxing the 20th Century (ISBN 0-7924-5850-8) is a book that was published in 1993 by The Ring magazine editors Steve Farhood and Stanley Weston.

The book has chapters for each of the decades that comprised the 20th century, with special pages dedicated to Jack Johnson, Jimmy Wilde, Benny Leonard, Jack Dempsey, Mickey Walker, Henry Armstrong, Joe Louis, Rocky Marciano, Sugar Ray Robinson, Muhammad Ali, Roberto Durán, Sugar Ray Leonard, Barry McGuigan and Mike Tyson.

The book covers news making boxing events from 1900 to 1992, with such article names as "When the judges need judges" (about Lupe Pintor's decision win over Carlos Zarate), "Ellis in Wonderland" (when Joe Frazier conquered the world Heavyweight title knocking out Jimmy Ellis) and "Midnight for the Cinderella Man" (when Joe Louis conquered the world Heavyweight title knocking out James J. Braddock, nicknamed "Cinderella Man").
