= Arnold Taylor =

South African boxer

Personal information
- Nationality: South African
- Born: 15 July 1945 Johannesburg, Gauteng, South Africa
- Died: 22 November 1981 (aged 36)
- Height: 5 ft 7 in (170 cm)
- Weight: bantamweight

Boxing career
- Reach: 69 in (175 cm)
- Stance: Orthodox

Boxing record
- Total fights: 50
- Wins: 40
- Win by KO: 17
- Losses: 8
- Draws: 1
- No contests: 1

Arnold Taylor (15 July 1945 – 22 November 1981) was a South African boxer who held the Lineal and WBA bantamweight championships in 1973.

== Background ==
Taylor lived during the apartheid period; Born to Muriel and Joe Taylor on 15 July 1945. White South African. Taylor was a qualified confectioner, he used to work at a local bakery in Johannesburg during the day before training at night.

== Pro career ==
Arnold Taylor made his professional boxing debut on 20 May 1967, against Ray Buttle, against whom he drew after six rounds in Transvaal. His first three fights were against Buttle; he won the Transvaal Bantamweight title with a ninth-round knockout of Buttle in his second fight, held on 30 June of the same year, at Johannesburg. On 11 December, he outpointed Buttle over eight rounds in a non-title bout, also at Johannesburg.

On 19 February 1968, he won the South African Bantamweight title; in only his fourth fight, beating Andries Steyn over twelve rounds by decision. After two non-title wins, he lost the title, and suffered his first career defeat, when he was knocked out in the first round by Dennis Adams on 1 July of the same year.

After that defeat, he had eight wins in a row, including three against Herby Clark (one by knockout, one by disqualification in six rounds and one by decision), and one each over Edward Mbongwa (on 7 September 1968, in what was his first fight abroad, fought in Swaziland) and one in Lesotho over Anthony Morodi. His third win over Clark, a twelve-round decision on 12 May 1969, actually gave him the South African Lightweight division, 15 pounds (about 1.1 stone) over his natural fighting weight.

Next was a rematch with Adams. Taylor lost weight to fight Adams for the South African Featherweight title, and he avenged his first defeat, conquering his third regional title along the way, by knocking Adams out in round eight, exactly twelve days after conquering the Lightweight title. He decided to vacate the Featherweight title and concentrate on defending his Lightweight title, but he lost that title on his first defense, when rematched with Steyn, on 4 July 1969, by a knockout in round eight also.

Two wins and one defeat later, he fought Ray Buttle's brother, Mike Buttle, in a rematch for the South African Bantamweight title, on 6 December; he had beaten Mike Buttle by a fifth-round knockout three weeks before. The rematch lasted one more round, as Taylor regained the title with a sixth-round knockout.

Taylor began the 1970s with an upgrade in opposition quality, when he fought fellow world Bantamweight champion Johnny Famechon, of Australia, on 11 April 1970, at Johannesburg. In his first fight against a former or future world champion, Taylot lost a ten-round decision. In his next fight, he faced Ray Buttle once again, this time winning again with a ninth-round knockout, on 15 August, to regain the South African Featherweight title. This began a streak of nineteen wins in a row, including five in Australia (where he lived for the first half of 1971), and one in Zimbabwe. After he had reached sixteen wins in a row, he was given his first world title shot.

On 3 November 1973, Taylor met the Lineal and WBA World Bantamweight champion, Mexico's Romeo Anaya, in a match refereed by Stanley Christodoulou. The fight is considered by many one of boxing's classic fights. One South African sportswriter called it "the bloodiest fight in South African boxing history". Taylor suffered a cut and was knocked down once in round five and three times in round eight (the WBA has since adopted a rule where a fighter is automatically declared a knockout loser if he or she is knocked down three times in the same round). Nevertheless, Taylor also cut the champion, and, in round fourteen, he connected with a right hand to Anaya's jaw, sending him to the floor. Feeling that this was his moment to become a world champion, Taylor screamed to his trainers: "He's gone!" from a neutral corner. It took Anaya two minutes to get up, and Taylor won the World Bantamweight crown.

After two non-title wins (including one over future Carlos Zarate challenger Paul Ferreri), Taylor defended his title for the only time, against Soo-Hwan Hong, on 3 July 1974, also at Durban. In what is also considered by many to be another boxing classic, Taylor was once again dropped four times. He was dropped three times early in the fight, and he staged a rally from rounds ten to fifteen, constantly pinning the challenger against the ring's corners and ropes, but he was dropped for a fourth time in round fourteen, and ended up losing the title by a fifteen-round unanimous decision.

The rest of his career was mostly undistinguished. He won four fights in a row, but, after losing two fights back to back, he decided to retire. Two fights that stand out among his last six fights were a rematch with Anaya, whom he beat again, by knockout in eight rounds at Johannesburg on 27 June 1975, and his last fight, when he was knocked out in eight rounds by Vernon Sollas, on 24 November 1976. His last two fights took place in Norway and England, respectively.

== Death ==
Taylor died on 22 November 1981. While driving a motorcycle belonging to his eldest daughter Charmaine, he was involved in an accident in which he was knocked over and he died at the scene of the accident.

== Professional boxing record ==
50 fights	40 wins	8 losses
By knockout	17	3
By decision	21	5
By disqualification	2	0
Draws	1	
No contests	1	

No.	Result	Record	Opponent	Type	Round	Date	Location	Notes
50	Loss	40–8–1 (1)	Vernon Sollas	RTD	8 (10)	24 Nov 1976	Anglo-American Sporting Club, Mayfair, London, England	
49	Loss	40–7–1 (1)	Svein Erik Paulsen	PTS	10	21 Oct 1976	Messehallen, Oslo, Norway	
48	Win	40–6–1 (1)	Dave Needham	PTS	10	8 May 1976	Ellis Park Tennis Stadium, Johannesburg, Gauteng, South Africa	
47	Win	39–6–1 (1)	Romeo Anaya	KO	8 (10)	27 Jun 1975	Ellis Park Tennis Stadium, Johannesburg, Gauteng, South Africa	
46	Win	38–6–1 (1)	Lothar Abend	RTD	3 (10)	5 May 1975	Ellis Park Tennis Stadium, Johannesburg, Gauteng, South Africa	
45	Win	37–6–1 (1)	John Mitchell	TKO	4 (10)	22 Feb 1975	Ellis Park Tennis Stadium, Johannesburg, Gauteng, South Africa	
44	Loss	36–6–1 (1)	Hong Soo-hwan	UD	15	3 Jul 1974	West Ridge Tennis Stadium, Durban, KwaZulu-Natal, South Africa	Lost WBA and The Ring bantamweight titles
43	Loss	36–5–1 (1)	Lorenzo Trujillo	PTS	10	31 May 1974	Showgrounds Hall, Port Elizabeth, Eastern Cape, South Africa	
42	Win	36–4–1 (1)	Paul Ferreri	PTS	10	18 Mar 1974	Goodwood Showgrounds, Cape Town, Western Cape, South Africa	
41	Win	35–4–1 (1)	Guy Caudron	PTS	10	16 Feb 1974	Rand Stadium, Johannesburg, Gauteng, South Africa	
40	Win	34–4–1 (1)	Romeo Anaya	KO	14 (15)	3 Nov 1973	Rand Stadium, Johannesburg, Gauteng, South Africa	Won WBA and The Ring bantamweight titles
39	Win	33–4–1 (1)	Billy Waith	PTS	10	16 Jun 1973	Portuguese Hall, Turffontein, Gauteng, South Africa	
38	Win	32–4–1 (1)	Jimmy Bell	PTS	10	28 Apr 1973	Ellis Park Tennis Stadium, Johannesburg, Gauteng, South Africa	
37	Win	31–4–1 (1)	Evan Armstrong	KO	4 (10)	28 Oct 1972	Ellis Park Tennis Stadium, Johannesburg, Gauteng, South Africa	
36	Win	30–4–1 (1)	Hansie van Rooyen	KO	6 (10)	13 May 1972	Ellis Park Tennis Stadium, Johannesburg, Gauteng, South Africa	
35	Win	29–4–1 (1)	Hansie van Rooyen	PTS	12	27 Mar 1972	Wembley Stadium, Johannesburg, Johannesburg, Gauteng, South Africa	Retained South African featherweight title
34	Win	28–4–1 (1)	Ugo Poli	KO	4 (10)	29 Jan 1972	Ellis Park Tennis Stadium, Johannesburg, Gauteng, South Africa	
33	Win	27–4–1 (1)	Chris Nel	RTD	7 (10)	27 Nov 1971	Glamis Stadium, Harare (Salisbury), Rhodesia	
32	Win	26–4–1 (1)	Luis Aisa	PTS	10	30 Oct 1971	Ellis Park Tennis Stadium, Johannesburg, Gauteng, South Africa	
31	Win	25–4–1 (1)	Alberto Jangalay	PTS	10	30 Aug 1971	Festival Hall, Melbourne, Victoria, Australia	
30	Win	24–4–1 (1)	Memo Espinosa	PTS	10	3 Aug 1971	Festival Hall, Melbourne, Victoria, Australia	
29	Win	23–4–1 (1)	Turori George	PTS	10	14 Jun 1971	Festival Hall, Melbourne, Victoria, Australia	
28	Win	22–4–1 (1)	Willie Cordova	PTS	10	17 May 1971	Festival Hall, Melbourne, Victoria, Australia	
27	Win	21–4–1 (1)	Willie Cordova	PTS	10	3 May 1971	Festival Hall, Melbourne, Victoria, Australia	
26	Win	20–4–1 (1)	Chris Nel	TKO	10 (10)	29 Dec 1970	Amphitheatre, Durban, KwaZulu-Natal, South Africa	
25	Win	19–4–1 (1)	Chris Nel	RTD	7 (8)	21 Sep 1970	City Hall, Durban, KwaZulu-Natal, South Africa	
24	Win	18–4–1 (1)	Ray Buttle	TKO	8 (12)	15 Aug 1970	Ellis Park Tennis Stadium, Johannesburg, Gauteng, South Africa	Retained South African featherweight title
23	Loss	17–4–1 (1)	Johnny Famechon	PTS	10	11 Apr 1970	Ellis Park Tennis Stadium, Johannesburg, Gauteng, South Africa	
22	Win	17–3–1 (1)	Mike Buttle	TKO	6 (12)	6 Dec 1969	Ellis Park Tennis Stadium, Johannesburg, Gauteng, South Africa	Won South African bantamweight title
21	Win	16–3–1 (1)	Mike Buttle	TKO	5 (8)	15 Nov 1969	Ellis Park Tennis Stadium, Johannesburg, Gauteng, South Africa	
20	Loss	15–3–1 (1)	John O'Brien	PTS	10	30 Aug 1969	Ellis Park Tennis Stadium, Johannesburg, Gauteng, South Africa	
19	Loss	15–2–1 (1)	Andries Steyn	RTD	8 (12)	4 Jul 1969	Allan Ford Stadium, Durban, KwaZulu-Natal, South Africa	For South African lightweight title
18	Win	15–1–1 (1)	Dennis Adams	RTD	8 (12)	24 May 1969	Ellis Park Tennis Stadium, Johannesburg, Gauteng, South Africa	Retained South African featherweight title
17	Win	14–1–1 (1)	Herby Clarke	PTS	12	12 May 1969	City Hall, Durban, KwaZulu-Natal, South Africa	Won vacant South African lightweight title
16	Win	13–1–1 (1)	Herby Clarke	DQ	6 (10)	11 Apr 1969	City Hall, Durban, KwaZulu-Natal, South Africa	Clarke disqualified for biting
15	Win	12–1–1 (1)	Henri Nesi	PTS	10	15 Feb 1969	Ellis Park Tennis Stadium, Johannesburg, Gauteng, South Africa	
14	Win	11–1–1 (1)	Colin Lake	DQ	3 (10)	2 Nov 1968	Ellis Park Tennis Stadium, Johannesburg, Gauteng, South Africa	
13	Win	10–1–1 (1)	Robert Trott	TKO	3 (6)	7 Oct 1968	City Hall, Johannesburg, Gauteng, South Africa	
12	Win	9–1–1 (1)	Anthony Morodi	PTS	6	5 Oct 1968	Lesotho National Stadium, Maseru, Lesotho	
11	Win	8–1–1 (1)	Edwin Mbongwe	PTS	6	7 Sep 1968	Swaziland National Stadium, Mbabane, Swaziland	
10	Win	7–1–1 (1)	Robert Trott	PTS	8	26 Aug 1968	City Hall, Johannesburg, Gauteng, South Africa	
9	Win	6–1–1 (1)	Herby Clarke	TKO	9 (10)	12 Aug 1968	City Hall, Johannesburg, Gauteng, South Africa	
8	Loss	5–1–1 (1)	Dennis Adams	KO	1 (12)	18 Jun 1968	City Hall, Johannesburg, Gauteng, South Africa	For South African bantamweight title
7	Win	5–0–1 (1)	Gerry Joey McBride	PTS	10	3 Jun 1968	City Hall, Johannesburg, Gauteng, South Africa	
6	Win	4–0–1 (1)	Bobby Davies	PTS	10	29 Apr 1968	City Hall, Johannesburg, Gauteng, South Africa	
5	Win	3–0–1 (1)	Andries Steyn	PTS	12	19 Feb 1968	City Hall, Johannesburg, Gauteng, South Africa	Won South African featherweight title
4	Win	2–0–1 (1)	Ray Buttle	PTS	8	11 Dec 1967	City Hall, Johannesburg, Gauteng, South Africa	
3	ND	1–0–1 (1)	Robert Trott	ND	4	25 Nov 1967	Ellis Park Rugby Stadium, Johannesburg, Gauteng, South Africa	
2	Win	1–0–1	Ray Buttle	TKO	9 (10)	30 Jun 1967	City Hall, Johannesburg, Gauteng, South Africa	Won vacant South African Transvaal 'white' bantamweight title
1	Draw	0–0–1	Ray Buttle	PTS	6	20 May 1967	Piet Potgieter High School Grounds, Mokopane, North-West, South Africa	

== See also ==
- List of bantamweight boxing champions
- List of WBA world champions

Achievements
Preceded by Romeo Anaya	WBA bantamweight champion 3 November 1973 – 3 July 1974	Succeeded by Soo-Hwan Hong
Preceded by Romeo Anaya	The Ring bantamweight champion 3 November 1973 – 3 July 1974	Succeeded by Soo-Hwan Hong
Preceded by Romeo Anaya	Lineal Bantamweight Champion; 3 November 1973 – 3 July 1974	Succeeded by Soo-Hwan Hong
