= Jimmy Revie =

British boxer (1947–2026)

Personal information
- Nationality: British
- Born: 8 July 1947 Stockwell, London, England
- Died: 13 September 2026 (aged 79) England
- Weight: Super featherweight, featherweight

Boxing career
- Stance: Southpaw

Boxing record
- Total fights: 48
- Wins: 38
- Win by KO: 23
- Losses: 9
- Draws: 1

Jimmy Revie (8 July 1947 – 13 September 2026) was a British boxer who held the British featherweight title between 1969 and 1971, and unsuccessfully challenged for the European title in 1971.

== Biography ==
Born in Stockwell, London, Revie made his professional debut with fifth-round stoppage of Brian Gullefer in September 1966.

In November 1967, he stopped Hugh Baxter in an eliminator for the British junior lightweight title, going on to challenge champion Jimmy Anderson in February 1968. Having won all his previous 13 fights inside the distance, Revie suffered his first defeat to Anderson, being stopped in the ninth round.

Revie dropped down to featherweight, and won his next six fights, setting up a shot at the British title vacated by Howard Winstone against former British Empire champion John O'Brien. The fight, in March 1969, ended in Revie's favour when the referee stopped it at the end of the fifth round due to injuries to O'Brien's eyes. He was considered a contender for Johnny Famechon's world title, but never got the chance to fight for it. Revie had five non-title fights before his first defence. In October 1969, he beat European champion Tommaso Galli via a points decision, winning by half a point. Despite suffering a cut above his eye in the Galli fight, he followed this with a points win by the same margin over Ecuadorian champion Miguel Herrera 12 days later, which saw him booed out of the ring by an unimpressed crowd at the Royal Albert Hall, and a third half-point win over Algerian Abdelkader Ould Makhloufi in November. He suffered his second professional defeat in April 1970 when he was stopped in the second round by Tunisian Tahar Ben Hassen.

Revie's first defence of the British title came in September 1970, beating Alan Rudkin at the Empire Pool, Wembley, the margin again just half a point.

In January 1971, Revie challenged for José Legrá's European title at the Anglo-American Sporting Club in Piccadilly. The fight went the full 15 rounds, with Legra retaining the belt by unanimous decision.

In July 1971, Revie made the second defence of his British title against Evan Armstrong at Grosvenor House, Mayfair; With Revie well ahead on points, Armstrong knocked him out in the twelfth round to take the title.

He won his next seven fights before defeating Vernon Sollas in a British title eliminator in March 1974. After Armstrong had vacated, Revie faced Sollas again in March 1975 at the Royal Albert Hall for the vacant title; Sollas controversially stopped Revie towards the end of the fourth round, Sollas having hit Revie while he was down. Revie fought six more times, winning only twice, his last two fights defeats at the hands of Jim Watt in March 1976, and Charlie Nash two months later.

Revie had an acting role in Jim Goddard's 1980 series Fox, playing Leon Cole in the episode King Billy.

Revie died of complications from pugilistic dementia on 13 September 2026, at the age of 79.
