= Tommy Glencross =

Scottish boxer

Personal information
- Nationality: British
- Born: 31 July 1947 Glasgow, Scotland
- Died: 29 February 2008 (aged 60)
- Weight: Featherweight, lightweight

Boxing career
- Stance: Southpaw

Boxing record
- Total fights: 48
- Wins: 31
- Win by KO: 8
- Losses: 16
- Draws: 1

Tommy Glencross (31 July 1947 – 29 February 2008) was a Scottish boxer, who held the British featherweight title between 1972 and 1973, the Scottish lightweight title between 1976 and 1977, and who twice challenged for the European featherweight title.

== Career ==
Born in Anderston, Glasgow, Glencross then moved to Dalmarnock in the city's East end. He boxed as an amateur as a member of Glasgow Transport Amateur Boxing Club, where, as a left-hander without great power he was encouraged by coach Tommy Bell to fight using a southpaw stance and concentrate on boxing skills. Glencross was a finalist at the ABA Championships in 1963 in the class 'A' 7-stone division, and won Scottish amateur titles in 1966 and 1967, and represented Scotland against England in January 1967, defeating Tony Hume. In May 1967, he fought at the European Amateur Boxing Championships in Rome, going out in the quarter-finals.

He turned professional in June 1967, stopping Frank Fitzgerald on his debut. He won his first twelve fights before suffering his first loss in February 1970 when he lost a points decision to experienced Ghanaian Bob Allotey in Barcelona. Glencross won his next eleven fights, including a points win over Luis Aisa and a sixth round knockout of former Spanish champion Valentin Loren, setting him up to challenge for José Legrá's European featherweight title in February 1972 at the Bingley Hall in Birmingham, after relocating to the city and signing with promoter Alex Griffiths; Legra retained the title on a split decision.

Glencross's next fight came in September that year, a challenge for Evan Armstrong's British title; The fight went the full fifteen rounds, with Glencross winning by only half a point to take the title. A draw against Jimmy Bell and defeats to Bingo Crooks and Billy Waith followed before Glencross got a second shot at the European title in May 1973, when he faced José Antonio Jiménez in Gijón for the vacant title; Glencross lost a unanimous decision. His bad run continued four months later when he was stopped due to a cut over his left eye is the first defence of his British title against Armstrong in Glasgow. He lost again to Crooks in April 1974, retiring due to broken bone in his hand, and subsequently going missing for twenty months.

Glencross was out of the ring for almost two years before returning in 1976 at lightweight with a first-round stoppage of Martyn Galleozzie. In March 1976 he beat Tommy Wright on points to take the BBBofC Scottish Area lightweight title but in April 1976 lost to Charlie Nash on points over eight rounds. He made a successful defence of the Scottish Area title later that month against John Gillan, racking up two further wins before facing Vernon Sollas in June. Sollas stopped him in the third round, and Glencross lost all of his remaining fights before retiring in 1978, although to high quality opponents, including future world champions Cecilio Lastra and Cornelius Boza-Edwards, former British champion Joey Singleton, and future British and European champion Colin Powers.

Glencross died on 29 February 2008, aged 60.
