= Colin Lake =

Welsh boxer and jockey

Personal information
- Nationality: British
- Born: 23 November 1941 (age 84) Newport, Wales
- Weight: Super featherweight

Boxing career

Boxing record
- Total fights: 30
- Wins: 20
- Win by KO: 7
- Losses: 9
- Draws: 1

Colin Lake (born 23 November 1941) is a British former boxer and jockey who fought for the British super featherweight boxing title in 1969. He went on to become a boxing trainer.

== Career ==
Born in Newport, Wales, and raised in Holloway, London, Lake took up boxing at the age of 8 at the Blythe Mansions Boxing Club, having his first fight at the age of 10. At the age of 15 he became an apprentice jockey at Newmarket. In five years he won 7 of 28 races. He then decided to pursue a career as a professional boxer.

Lake made his professional boxing debut in October 1963, stopping Don McCrea in five rounds. He won his first seven fights before losing on points in May 1964 to Arnold Bell. In June 1964, his opponent Lyn James died after collapsing in the sixth round due to a brain injury. By May 1968 he had built up a record of 19 wins from 23 fights, before two points defeats at the hands of Jimmy Revie, and a third round disqualification for a low blow against South African bantamweight champion Arnold Taylor in Johannesburg.

Managed at the time by Terry Downes, in January 1969, Lake beat British super-featherweight champion Jimmy Anderson in a non-title fight at the York Hall, Bethnal Green, Anderson being disqualified in the sixth round for kidney punching. The victory earned Lake a shot at Anderson's title, and the two met again four weeks later at the Royal Albert Hall, Anderson retaining the title with a seventh round stoppage and winning the £500 gold championship belt outright.

Lake had two further fights, defeats to Antonio Puddu and Brian Hudson, before retiring from the sport. His professional record included 20 wins, 9 losses, and 1 draw.

He subsequently became a boxing trainer, working with boxers such as Ivor Jones, Colin Dunne, and John Ryder, as well as many amateurs at the Angel ABC in Islington.
