= List of The Ring world champions =

Boxing magazine The Ring has awarded world championships in professional boxing within each weight class from its foundation in 1922. The first Ring world title belt was awarded to heavyweight champion Jack Dempsey, and the second was awarded to flyweight champion Pancho Villa. The magazine stopped giving belts to world champions in the 1990s, but reintroduced their titles in 2001.

Boxers who won the title but were immediately stripped and the title bout being overturned to a no contest will not be listed.

Current champion
Most consecutive title defenses

== Heavyweight ==
No.	Name	Reign	Defenses
1	Jack Dempsey (awarded inaugural title)	1922 – 23 Sep 1926	2
2	Gene Tunney	23 Sep 1926 – 31 Jul 1928	2
Tunney retired.
3	Max Schmeling (def. Jack Sharkey)	12 Jun 1930 – 21 Jun 1932	1
4	Jack Sharkey	21 Jun 1932 – 29 Jun 1933	0
5	Primo Carnera	29 Jun 1933 – 14 Jun 1934	2
6	Max Baer	14 Jun 1934 – 13 Jun 1935	0
7	James J. Braddock	13 Jun 1935 – 22 Jun 1937	0
8	Joe Louis	22 Jun 1937 – 1 Mar 1949	26
Louis retired.
9	Ezzard Charles (def. Joe Louis)	27 Sep 1950 – 18 Jul 1951	4
10	Jersey Joe Walcott	18 Jul 1951 – 23 Sep 1952	1
11	Rocky Marciano	23 Sept 1952 – 27 Apr 1956	6
Marciano retired.
12	Floyd Patterson (def. Archie Moore)	30 Nov 1956 – 26 Jun 1959	4
13	Ingemar Johansson	26 Jun 1959 – 29 Jun 1960	0
14	Floyd Patterson (2)	29 Jun 1960 – 25 Sep 1962	2
15	Sonny Liston	25 Sep 1962 – 25 Feb 1964	1
16	Muhammad Ali	25 Feb 1964 – 13 Mar 1970	9
Ali was stripped of the title due to his refusal to be drafted to army service. Frazier was awarded the title in May.
17	Joe Frazier (awarded title)	May 1970 – 22 Jan 1973	4
18	George Foreman	22 Jan 1973 – 30 Oct 1974	2
19	Muhammad Ali (2)	30 Oct 1974 – 15 Feb 1978	10
20	Leon Spinks	15 Feb – 15 Sep 1978	0
21	Muhammad Ali (3)	15 Sep 1978 – 3 Jul 1979	0
Ali retired.
22	Larry Holmes (awarded The Ring title upon Mike Weaver's def. of John Tate for the WBA title, as Holmes had previously successfully defended his WBC title against Weaver)	31 Mar 1980 – 21 Sep 1985	14
23	Michael Spinks	21 Sep 1985 – 27 Jun 1988	3
24	Mike Tyson	27 Jun 1988 – 31 Dec 1989	2
New ownership discontinued the championship policy during Tyson's reign.
25	Lennox Lewis (awarded title)	2 Dec 2001 – 6 Feb 2004	2
Lewis retired as champion and chose not to accept a rematch with Vitali Klitschko before a WBC-mandated 1 March deadline to accept the bout.
26	Vitali Klitschko (def. Corrie Sanders)	24 Apr 2004 – 9 Nov 2005	1
Vitali Klitschko retired after withdrawing from a bout against Hasim Rahman due to injuries.
27	Wladimir Klitschko (def. Ruslan Chagaev)	20 Jun 2009 – 28 Nov 2015	11
28	Tyson Fury	28 Nov 2015 – 1 Feb 2018	0
Fury was stripped of the title for failing to declare an opponent by 31 January 2018, the deadline set by The Ring.
29	Tyson Fury (2) (def. Deontay Wilder)	22 Feb 2020 – 13 Aug 2022	2
Fury vacates the title.
30	Oleksandr Usyk (def. Anthony Joshua)	20 Aug 2022 – present	5

== Cruiserweight ==
No.	Name	Reign	Defenses
1	Carlos de León (awarded inaugural title)	3 Feb 1984 – 6 Jun 1985	2
2	Alfonzo Ratliff	6 Jun – 21 Sep 1985	0
3	Bernard Benton	21 Sep 1985 – 22 Mar 1986	0
4	Carlos de León (2)	22 Mar 1986 – 30 Mar 1987	2
Title is vacated because The Ring stopped recognizing the division.
5	Jean-Marc Mormeck (def. Wayne Braithwaite)	2 Apr 2005 – 7 Jan 2006	0
6	O'Neil Bell	7 Jan 2006 – 17 Mar 2007	0
7	Jean-Marc Mormeck (2)	17 Mar – 10 Nov 2007	0
8	David Haye	10 Nov 2007 – 30 Jun 2008	1
Haye expressed that he'll move up to heavyweight. The title is vacated on 30 June ratings.
9	Tomasz Adamek (def. Steve Cunningham)	11 Dec 2008 – 10 Feb 2010	2
Adamek vacated the title to stay at heavyweight.
10	Yoan Pablo Hernández (def. Steve Cunningham)	4 Feb 2012 – 23 Nov 2015	3
Hernández is stripped of the title due to inactivity.
11	Oleksandr Usyk (def. Murat Gassiev)	21 Jul 2018 – 16 Oct 2019	1
Usyk vacated the title to move up to heavyweight.
12	Mairis Briedis (def. Yuniel Dorticos)	26 Sep 2020 – 2 Jul 2022	1
13	Jai Opetaia	2 Jul 2022 – present	9

== Light heavyweight ==
No.	Name	Reign	Defenses
1	Mike McTigue (awarded inaugural title)	1924 – 23 May 1925	0
2	Paul Berlenbach	23 May 1925 – 16 Jul 1926	3
3	Jack Delaney	16 Jul 1926 – Jun 1927	1
Delaney vacates the title to move up to heavyweight.
4	Tommy Loughran (def. Mike McTigue)	7 Oct 1927 – 18 Jul 1929	5
Loughran vacates the title to move up to heavyweight.
5	Maxie Rosenbloom (def. Jimmy Slattery)	25 Jun 1930 – 16 Nov 1934	7
6	Bob Olin	16 Nov 1934 – 31 Oct 1935	0
7	John Henry Lewis	31 Oct 1935 – Jun 1939	5
Lewis retires.
8	Billy Conn (def. Melio Bettina)	13 Jul 1939 – Jun 1941	3
Conn vacates the title to move up to heavyweight.
9	Gus Lesnevich (def. Tami Mauriello)	26 Aug 1941 – 26 Jul 1948	4
10	Freddie Mills	26 Jul 1948 – 24 Jan 1950	0
11	Joey Maxim	24 Jan 1950 – 17 Dec 1952	2
12	Archie Moore	17 Dec 1952 – 12 May 1962	9
Moore vacates the title to move up to heavyweight.
13	Harold Johnson (def. Doug Jones)	12 May 1962 – 1 Jun 1963	1
14	Willie Pastrano	1 Jun 1963 – 30 Mar 1965	2
15	José Torres	30 Mar 1965 – 16 Dec 1966	3
16	Dick Tiger	16 Dec 1966 – 24 May 1968	2
17	Bob Foster	24 May 1968 – 16 Sep 1974	14
Foster retires.
18	Matthew Saad Muhammad (awarded title)	30 Nov 1979 – 19 Dec 1981	7
19	Dwight Muhammad Qawi	19 Dec 1981 – 18 Mar 1983	3
20	Michael Spinks	18 Mar 1983 – 5 Nov 1985	4
Spinks vacates all of his titles to stay at heavyweight.
21	Roy Jones Jr. (awarded title)	2 Dec 2001 – 15 May 2004	3
22	Antonio Tarver	15 May – 18 Dec 2004	0
23	Glen Johnson	18 Dec 2004 – 18 Jun 2005	0
24	Antonio Tarver (2)	18 Jun 2005 – 10 Jun 2006	1
25	Bernard Hopkins	10 Jun 2006 – 19 Apr 2008	1
26	Joe Calzaghe	19 Apr 2008 – 5 Feb 2009	1
Calzaghe retires.
27	Jean Pascal (def. Chad Dawson)	14 Aug 2010 – 21 May 2011	1
28	Bernard Hopkins (2)	21 May 2011 – 28 Apr 2012	0
29	Chad Dawson	28 Apr 2012 – 8 Jun 2013	0
30	Adonis Stevenson	8 Jun 2013 – 23 Nov 2015	6
Stevenson is stripped of the title for failing to fight a top 5 contender within 2 years of his last fight against another top 5 contender.
31	Andre Ward (def. Sergey Kovalev)	17 Jun – 21 Sep 2017	0
Ward retires.
32	Artur Beterbiev (def. Dmitry Bivol)	12 Oct 2024 – 22 Feb 2025	0
33	Dmitry Bivol	22 Feb 2025 – present	1

== Super middleweight ==
No.	Name	Reign	Defenses
1	Joe Calzaghe (def. Jeff Lacy)	4 Mar 2006 – 26 Sep 2008	3
Calzaghe vacates the title to stay at light heavyweight.
2	Andre Ward (def. Carl Froch)	17 Dec 2011 – 19 Feb 2015	2
Ward is stripped of the title for failing to schedule a fight with a top 5 contender from any weight class for two years per The Ring policy.
3	Callum Smith (def. George Groves)	28 Sep 2018 – 19 Dec 2020	2
4	Canelo Álvarez	19 Dec 2020 – 13 Sep 2025	9
5	Terence Crawford	13 Sep 2025 – 27 Jan 2026	0
Following his retirement, the title was vacated on the 27 January 2026 ratings.

== Middleweight ==
No.	Name	Reign	Defenses
1	Harry Greb (awarded inaugural title)	1924 – 26 Feb 1926	3
2	Tiger Flowers	26 Feb – 3 Dec 1926	1
3	Mickey Walker	3 Dec 1926 – 19 Jun 1931	3
Walker vacated to move up to heavyweight.
4	Marcel Thil (def. Gorilla Jones)	11 Jun 1932 – 23 Sep 1937	10
Thil retires.
5	Freddie Steele (awarded title)	23 Sep 1937 – 1938	1
Steele stripped of the title.
6	Tony Zale (def. Georgie Abrams)	28 Nov 1941 – 16 Jul 1947	1
7	Rocky Graziano	16 July 1947 – 10 Jun 1948	0
8	Tony Zale (2)	10 Jun – 21 Sep 1948	0
9	Marcel Cerdan	21 Sep 1948 – 17 Jun 1949	0
10	Jake LaMotta	17 Jun 1949 – 14 Feb 1951	2
11	Sugar Ray Robinson	14 Feb – 10 Jul 1951	0
12	Randy Turpin	10 Jul – 12 Sep 1951	0
13	Sugar Ray Robinson (2)	12 Sep 1951 – 18 Dec 1952	2
Robinson vacated the title and retired.
14	Carl Olson (def. Randy Turpin)	21 Oct 1953 – 9 Dec 1955	3
15	Sugar Ray Robinson (3)	9 Dec 1955 – 2 Jan 1957	1
16	Gene Fullmer	2 Jan – 1 May 1957	0
17	Sugar Ray Robinson (4)	1 May – 23 Sep 1957	0
18	Carmen Basilio	23 Sep 1957 – 25 Mar 1958	0
19	Sugar Ray Robinson (5)	25 Mar 1958 – 22 Jan 1960	0
20	Paul Pender	22 Jan 1960 – 11 Jul 1961	3
21	Terry Downes	11 Jul 1961 – 7 Apr 1962	0
22	Paul Pender (2)	7 Apr 1962 – 7 May 1963	0
Pender retires.
23	Dick Tiger (awarded title)	7 May – 7 Dec 1963	1
24	Joey Giardello	7 Dec 1963 – 21 Oct 1965	1
25	Dick Tiger (2)	21 Oct 1965 – 25 Apr 1966	0
26	Emile Griffith	25 Apr 1966 – 17 Apr 1967	2
27	Nino Benvenuti	17 Apr – 20 Sep 1967	0
28	Emile Griffith (2)	29 Sep 1967 – 4 Mar 1968	0
29	Nino Benvenuti (2)	4 Mar 1968 – 7 Nov 1970	4
30	Carlos Monzón	7 Nov 1970 – 29 Aug 1977	14
Monzón retires.
31	Rodrigo Valdez (def. Bennie Briscoe)	5 Nov 1977 – 22 Apr 1978	0
32	Hugo Corro	22 Apr 1978 – 30 Jun 1979	2
33	Vito Antuofermo	30 Jun 1979 – 16 Mar 1980	1
34	Alan Minter	16 Mar – 27 Sep 1980	1
35	Marvin Hagler	27 Sep 1980 – 6 Apr 1987	12
36	Sugar Ray Leonard	6 April – 27 May 1987	0
Leonard retires.
37	Sumbu Kalambay (awarded title)	6 Jul 1988 – 25 Mar 1989	2
38	Michael Nunn	25 Mar 1989 – 31 Dec 1989	1
New ownership discontinued under the championship policy during Nunn's reign.
39	Bernard Hopkins (awarded title)	2 Dec 2001 – 16 Jul 2005	6
40	Jermain Taylor	16 Jul 2005 – 29 Sep 2007	4
41	Kelly Pavlik	29 Sep 2007 – 17 Apr 2010	3
42	Sergio Martínez	17 Apr 2010 – 7 Jun 2014	6
43	Miguel Cotto	7 Jun 2014 – 21 Nov 2015	1
44	Canelo Álvarez	21 Nov 2015 – 12 Jun 2018	2
Álvarez is stripped of the title after testing positive of Clenbuterol.
45	Canelo Álvarez (2) (def. Gennady Golovkin)	15 Sep 2018 – 2 Jan 2021	1
The title is vacated one day after Álvarez vacates his last alphabet title to stay at super middleweight.

== Junior middleweight ==
No.	Name	Reign	Defenses
1	Oscar Albarado (def. Koichi Wajima)	4 Jun 1974 – 21 Jan 1975	1
2	Koichi Wajima	21 Jan – 7 Jun 1975	0
3	Yuh Jae-Doo	7 June 1975 – 17 Feb 1976	1
4	Koichi Wajima (2)	17 Feb – 18 May 1976	0
5	José Durán	18 May – 8 Oct 1976	0
6	Miguel Angel Castellini	8 Oct 1976 – 5 Mar 1977	0
7	Eddie Gazo	5 Mar 1977 – 9 Aug 1978	3
8	Masashi Kudo	9 Aug 1978 – 24 Oct 1979	3
9	Ayub Kalule	24 Oct 1979 – 25 Jun 1981	4
10	Sugar Ray Leonard	25 Jun 1981 – 1982	0
Leonard vacates the title to move back down to welterweight.
11	Thomas Hearns (def. Wilfred Benítez)	3 Dec 1982 – 24 Oct 1986	4
Hearns vacates his alphabet title to officially move up in weight class.
12	Oscar De La Hoya (def. Fernando Vargas)	14 Sep 2002 – 13 Sep 2003	1
13	Shane Mosley	13 Sep 2003 – 13 Mar 2004	0
14	Winky Wright	13 Mar 2004 – 2 Nov 2005	1
Wright stays at middleweight. The title is vacated on 2 November ratings.
15	Canelo Álvarez (def. Austin Trout)	20 Apr – 14 Sep 2013	0
16	Floyd Mayweather Jr.	14 Sep 2013 – 10 Aug 2015	0
Mayweather Jr. is stripped of the title due to inactivity in the weight class.
17	Jermell Charlo (def. Jeison Rosario)	26 Sep 2020 – 13 Jul 2024	2
Charlo is stripped due to inactivity.

== Welterweight ==
No.	Name	Reign	Defenses
1	Mickey Walker (awarded inaugural title)	1924 – 20 May 1926	2
2	Pete Latzo	20 May 1926 – 3 Jun 1927	2
3	Joe Dundee	3 Jun 1927 – 25 Jul 1929	0
4	Jackie Fields	25 Jul 1929 – 9 May 1930	0
5	Jack Thompson	9 May – 5 Sep 1930	0
6	Tommy Freeman	5 Sep 1930 – 14 Apr 1931	0
7	Jack Thompson (2)	14 Apr – 23 Oct 1931	0
8	Lou Brouillard	23 Oct 1931 – 28 Jan 1932	0
9	Jackie Fields (2)	28 Jan 1932 – 22 Feb 1933	0
10	Young Corbett III	22 February – 29 May 1933	0
11	Jimmy McLarnin	29 May 1933 – 28 May 1934	0
12	Barney Ross	28 May – 17 Sep 1934	0
13	Jimmy McLarnin (2)	17 Sep 1934 – 28 May 1935	0
14	Barney Ross (2)	28 May 1935 – 31 May 1938	2
15	Henry Armstrong	31 May 1938 – 4 Oct 1940	19
16	Fritzie Zivic	4 Oct 1940 – 29 Jul 1941	1
17	Freddie Cochrane	29 Jul 1941 – 1 Feb 1946	0
18	Marty Servo	1 Feb – 25 Sep 1946	0
Servo retires.
19	Sugar Ray Robinson (def. Tommy Bell)	20 Dec 1946 – 15 Feb 1951	5
Robinson's title is automatically vacated after winning the middleweight title.
20	Kid Gavilán (def. Billy Graham)	29 Aug 1951 – 20 Oct 1954	7
21	Johnny Saxton	20 Oct 1954 – 1 Apr 1955	0
22	Tony DeMarco	1 Apr – 10 Jun 1955	0
23	Carmen Basilio	10 Jun 1955 – 14 Mar 1956	1
24	Johnny Saxton (2)	14 Mar – 12 Sep 1956	0
25	Carmen Basilio (2)	12 Sep 1956 – 23 Sep 1957	1
Basilio vacated after winning the middleweight title.
26	Virgil Akins (def. Vince Martinez)	6 June – 5 Dec 1958	0
27	Don Jordan	5 Dec 1958 – 27 May 1960	2
28	Benny Paret	27 May 1960 – 1 Apr 1961	1
29	Emile Griffith	1 Apr – 30 Sep 1961	1
30	Benny Paret (2)	30 Sep 1961 – 24 Mar 1962	0
31	Emile Griffith (2)	24 Mar 1962 – 21 Mar 1963	2
32	Luis Manuel Rodríguez	21 Mar – 8 Jun 1963	0
33	Emile Griffith (3)	8 Jun 1963 – 1966	5
Griffith vacates the title to stay at middleweight.
34	Curtis Cokes (def. Jean Josselin)	28 Nov 1966 – 18 Apr 1969	4
35	José Nápoles	18 Apr 1969 – 3 Dec 1970	3
36	Billy Backus	3 Dec 1970 – 4 Jun 1971	0
37	José Nápoles (2)	4 Jun 1971 – 6 Dec 1975	10
38	John Stracey	6 Dec 1975 – 22 Jun 1976	1
39	Carlos Palomino	22 Jun 1976 – 14 Jan 1979	7
40	Wilfred Benítez	14 Jan – 30 Nov 1979	1
41	Sugar Ray Leonard	30 Nov 1979 – 20 Jun 1980	1
42	Roberto Durán	20 Jun – 25 Nov 1980	0
43	Sugar Ray Leonard (2)	25 Nov 1980 – 9 Nov 1982	2
Leonard retires for the first time due to an eye injury.
44	Donald Curry (def. Milton McCrory)	6 Dec 1985 – 27 Sep 1986	1
45	Lloyd Honeyghan	27 Sep 1986 – 27 Oct 1987	3
46	Jorge Vaca	27 Oct 1987 – 29 Mar 1988	0
47	Lloyd Honeyghan (2)	29 Mar 1988 – 4 Feb 1989	1
48	Marlon Starling	4 Feb – 31 Dec 1989	1
New ownership discontinued under the championship policy during Starling's reign.
49	Vernon Forrest (def. Shane Mosley)	26 Jan 2002 – 25 Jan 2003	1
50	Ricardo Mayorga	25 Jan – 13 Dec 2003	1
51	Cory Spinks	13 Dec 2003 – 5 Feb 2005	2
52	Zab Judah	5 Feb 2005 – 7 Jan 2006	1
53	Carlos Baldomir	7 Jan – 4 Nov 2006	1
54	Floyd Mayweather Jr.	4 Nov 2006 – 6 Jun 2008	1
Mayweather Jr. retires for the first time.
55	Floyd Mayweather Jr. (2) (def. Robert Guerrero)	4 May 2013 – 12 Sep 2015	4
Mayweather Jr. retires.
56	Terence Crawford (def. Errol Spence Jr.)	29 Jul 2023 – 3 Aug 2024	0
Crawford’s title was vacated after he moved up to junior middleweight.
57	Jaron Ennis (def. Eimantas Stanionis)	12 Apr – 7 Aug 2025	0
Ennis announced that he will move up to junior middleweight. The title was vacated on the 7 Aug rankings.

== Junior welterweight ==
No.	Name	Reign	Defenses
1	Mushy Callahan (awarded inaugural title)	1928 – 18 Feb 1930	1
2	Jack Berg	18 Feb 1930 – 1931	6
The Ring ended the list in 1931 and then resumed in 1962.
3	Duilio Loi (def. Eddie Perkins)	15 Dec 1962 – 24 Jan 1963	0
Loi retires.
4	Eddie Perkins (def. Roberto Cruz)	15 Jun 1963 – 18 Jan 1965	2
5	Carlos Hernández	18 Jan 1965 – 29 Apr 1966	2
6	Sandro Lopopolo	29 Apr 1966 – 30 Apr 1967	1
7	Takeshi Fuji	30 Apr 1967 – 12 Dec 1968	1
8	Nicolino Locche	12 Dec 1968 – 10 Mar 1972	5
9	Alfonso Frazer	10 Mar – 28 Oct 1972	0
10	Antonio Cervantes	28 Oct 1972 – 6 Mar 1976	10
11	Wilfred Benítez	6 Mar 1976 – 1979	3
Benítez vacates the title to move up to welterweight.
12	Antonio Cervantes (2) (def. Miguel Montilla)	18 Jan 1979 – 2 Aug 1980	2
13	Aaron Pryor	2 Aug 1980 – 26 Oct 1983	8
Pryor retires.
14	Kostya Tszyu (awarded title)	2 Dec 2001 – 4 Jun 2005	3
15	Ricky Hatton	4 Jun 2005 – 3 May 2009	5
16	Manny Pacquiao	3 May 2009 – 26 Jul 2010	0
Pacquiao vacates the title to stay at welterweight.
17	Danny Garcia (def. Amir Khan)	14 Jul 2012 – 10 Aug 2015	4
Garcia vacates the title to stay at welterweight.
18	Terence Crawford (def. Viktor Postol)	23 Jul 2016 – 18 Feb 2018	3
Crawford expressed his intentions of moving up to welterweight and vacated his alphabet titles. The title is vacated on the 18 February 2018 rankings.
19	Josh Taylor (def. Regis Prograis)	26 Oct 2019 – 10 Jun 2023	3
20	Teofimo Lopez	10 Jun 2023 – 31 Jan 2026	3
21	Shakur Stevenson	31 Jan 2026 – present	0

== Lightweight ==
No.	Name	Reign	Defenses
1	Benny Leonard (awarded inaugural title)	1924 – 15 Jan 1925	0
Leonard retires.
2	Jimmy Goodrich (def. Stanislaus Loayza)	13 Jul – 7 Dec 1925	0
3	Rocky Kansas	7 Dec 1925 – 3 Jul 1926	0
4	Sammy Mandell	3 Jul 1926 – 17 Jul 1930	2
5	Al Singer	17 Jul – 14 Nov 1930	0
6	Tony Canzoneri	14 Nov 1930 – 23 Jun 1933	4
7	Barney Ross	23 Jun 1933 – 15 Apr 1935	1
Ross vacated the title to move up to super lightweight.
8	Tony Canzoneri (2) (def. Lou Ambers)	10 May 1935 – 3 Sep 1936	1
9	Lou Ambers	3 Sep 1936 – 17 Aug 1938	2
10	Henry Armstrong	17 Aug 1938 – 22 Aug 1939	1
11	Lou Ambers (2)	22 Aug 1939 – 10 May 1940	0
12	Lew Jenkins	10 May 1940 – 19 Dec 1941	1
13	Sammy Angott	19 Dec 1941 – 13 Nov 1942	1
Angott retires.
14	Ike Williams (def. Bob Montgomery)	4 Aug 1947 – 25 May 1951	5
15	Jimmy Carter	25 May 1951 – 14 May 1952	2
16	Lauro Salas	14 May – 15 Oct 1952	0
17	Jimmy Carter (2)	15 Oct 1952 – 5 Mar 1954	3
18	Paddy DeMarco	5 Mar – 17 Nov 1954	0
19	Jimmy Carter (3)	17 Nov 1954 – 29 Jun 1955	0
20	Wallace Smith	29 Jun 1955 – 24 Aug 1956	1
21	Joe Brown	24 Aug 1956 – 21 Apr 1962	11
22	Carlos Ortiz	21 Apr 1962 – 10 Apr 1965	4
23	Ismael Laguna	10 Apr – 13 Nov 1965	0
24	Carlos Ortiz (2)	13 Nov 1965 – 29 Jun 1968	5
25	Carlos Cruz	29 Jun 1968 – 18 Feb 1969	1
26	Mando Ramos	18 Feb 1969 – 3 Mar 1970	1
27	Ismael Laguna (2)	3 Mar – 26 Sep 1970	1
28	Ken Buchanan	26 Sep 1970 – 26 Jun 1972	2
29	Roberto Durán	26 Jun 1972 – 1979	12
Durán vacates the title to move up to welterweight.
30	Jim Watt (awarded title)	12 Apr – 20 June 1981	0
31	Alexis Argüello	20 Jun 1981 – Feb 1983	4
Argüello vacates the title to move up to junior welterweight.
32	Julio César Chávez (def. José Luis Ramírez)	29 Oct 1988 – 2 Mar 1989	0
Chávez vacates the title to move up to junior welterweight.
33	Pernell Whitaker (def. José Luis Ramírez)	20 Aug – 31 Dec 1989	0
New ownership discontinued under the championship policy during Whitaker's reign.
34	Floyd Mayweather Jr. (def. José Luis Castillo)	20 Apr 2002 – 22 May 2004	3
Mayweather Jr. vacates the title to move up to junior welterweight.
35	José Luis Castillo (def. Juan Lazcano)	5 Jun 2004 – 7 May 2005	2
36	Diego Corrales	7 May 2005 – 6 Oct 2006	0
Corrales is stripped of the title for being overweight in his fight against Casamayor.
37	Joel Casamayor (def. Diego Corrales)	7 Oct 2006 – 13 Sep 2008	2
38	Juan Manuel Márquez	13 Sep 2008 – 23 Apr 2012	3
Márquez vacates the title to stay at junior welterweight.
39	Terence Crawford (def. Ray Beltrán)	29 Nov 2014 – 22 Apr 2015	0
Crawford vacates the title to stay at junior welterweight.
40	Jorge Linares (def. Anthony Crolla)	24 Sep 2016 – 13 May 2018	3
41	Vasiliy Lomachenko	13 May 2018 – 17 Oct 2020	3
42	Teófimo López	17 Oct 2020 – 27 Nov 2021	0
43	George Kambosos Jr.	27 Nov 2021 – 5 June 2022	0
44	Devin Haney	5 Jun 2022 – 29 Nov 2023	2
Haney vacated the title to move up to junior welterweight.

== Junior lightweight ==
No.	Name	Reign	Defenses
1	Steve Sullivan (def. Johnny Dundee)	20 Jun 1924 – 1 Apr 1925	2
2	Mike Ballerino	1 Apr – 2 Dec 1925	1
3	Tod Morgan	2 Dec 1925 – 20 Dec 1929	12
4	Benny Bass	20 Dec 1929 – 15 Jul 1931	0
5	Kid Chocolate	15 July 1931 – 1931	1
The Ring ended the list in 1931 and then resumed in 1962.
6	Flash Elorde (awarded title)	1962 – 14 Jun 1967	6
7	Yoshiaki Numata	15 Jun – 14 Dec 1967	0
8	Hiroshi Kobayashi	14 Dec 1967 – 29 Jul 1971	6
9	Alfredo Marcano	29 Jul 1971 – 25 Apr 1972	1
10	Ben Villaflor	25 Apr 1972 – 13 Mar 1973	1
11	Kuniaki Shibata	13 Mar – 17 Oct 1973	1
12	Ben Villaflor (2)	17 Oct 1973 – 16 Oct 1976	5
13	Samuel Serrano	16 Oct 1976 – 2 Aug 1980	10
14	Yasutsune Uehara	2 Aug 1980 – 9 Apr 1981	1
15	Samuel Serrano (2)	9 Apr 1981 – 19 Jan 1983	3
16	Roger Mayweather	19 Jan 1983 – 26 Feb 1984	2
17	Rocky Lockridge	26 Feb 1984 – 19 May 1985	2
18	Wilfredo Gómez	19 May 1985 – 24 May 1986	0
19	Alfredo Layne	24 May – 27 Sep 1986	0
20	Brian Mitchell	27 Sep 1986 – 30 Mar 1987	1
The Ring ended the list in 1986 and then resumed in 1989.
21	Manny Pacquiao (def. Juan Manuel Márquez)	15 Mar – 28 Jul 2008	0
Pacquiao vacates the title to stay at lightweight.
22	Shakur Stevenson (def. Óscar Valdez)	30 Apr – 22 Sep 2022	0
Stevenson was stripped of the title after missing weight in his fight against mandatory challenger Robson Conceição.
23	O'Shaquie Foster (def. Emanuel Navarrete)	24 Oct 2026 – present	0

== Featherweight ==
While there was no official featherweight champion between 1989 and 2002 (as The Ring awarded no titles in any division during that period), Naseem Hamed was retroactively awarded the Ring title in 2019 (the only former world champion in any division thus far to receive this honor) due to his dominance of the division and the multiple champions he beat.

No.	Name	Reign	Defenses
1	Louis Kid Kaplan (def. Danny Kramer)	2 Jan 1925 – 6 Jul 1926	3
Kaplan vacates the title.
2	Tony Canzoneri (def. Johnny Dundee)	24 Oct 1927 – 28 Sep 1928	1
3	André Routis	28 Sep 1928 – 23 Sep 1929	1
4	Christopher Battalino	23 Sep 1929 – 1 Mar 1932	5
Battalino vacates the title.
5	Kid Chocolate (def. Lew Feldman)	13 Oct 1932 – 17 Feb 1934	2
Chocolate vacates the title.
6	Freddie Miller (def. Nel Tarleton)	20 Sept 1934 – 11 May 1936	5
7	Petey Sarron	11 May 1936 – 29 Oct 1937	2
8	Henry Armstrong	29 Oct 1937 – 12 Sep 1938	0
Armstrong vacated the title to stay at the higher weight divisions.
9	Joey Archibald (def. Leo Rodak)	18 Apr 1939 – 20 May 1940	1
10	Harry Jeffra	20 May 1940 – 12 May 1941	1
11	Joey Archibald (2)	12 May – 11 Sep 1941	0
12	Chalky Wright	11 Sep 1941 – 20 Nov 1942	2
13	Willie Pep	20 Nov 1942 – 29 Oct 1948	6
14	Sandy Saddler	29 Oct 1948 – 11 Feb 1949	0
15	Willie Pep (2)	11 Feb 1949 – 8 Sep 1950	3
16	Sandy Saddler (2)	8 Sep 1950 – 21 Jan 1957	3
Saddler retires.
17	Hogan Bassey (def. Cherif Hamia)	24 Jun 1957 – 18 Mar 1959	1
18	Davey Moore	18 Mar 1959 – 21 Mar 1963	5
19	Sugar Ramos	21 Mar 1963 – 26 Sep 1964	3
20	Vicente Saldívar	26 Sep 1964 – 14 Oct 1967	7
Saldívar retired after his 7th defense.
21	Johnny Famechon (def. José Legrá)	21 Jan 1969 – 9 May 1970	2
22	Vicente Saldívar (2)	9 May – 11 Dec 1970	0
23	Kuniaki Shibata	11 Dec 1970 – 19 May 1972	2
24	Clemente Sánchez	19 May – 16 Dec 1972	0
Sánchez is stripped of the title for failing to make weight.
25	Alexis Argüello (def. Rigoberto Riasco)	31 May 1975 – 20 Jun 1977	2
Argüello vacates the title to move up to junior lightweight.
26	Danny Lopez (def. Roberto Castañón)	10 Mar 1979 – 2 Feb 1980	2
27	Salvador Sánchez	2 Feb 1980 – 12 Aug 1982	9
Sánchez died thus making the title vacant.
28	Eusebio Pedroza (awarded title)	22 Sep 1982 – 8 Jun 1985	5
29	Barry McGuigan	8 Jun 1985 – 23 Jun 1986	2
30	Steve Cruz	23 Jun 1986 – 6 Mar 1987	0
31	Antonio Esparragoza	6 Mar 1987 – 31 Dec 1989	6
New ownership discontinued under the championship policy during Esparragoza's reign.
32	Marco Antonio Barrera (def. Érik Morales)	22 Jun 2002 – 15 Nov 2003	2
33	Manny Pacquiao	15 Nov 2003 – 18 Jun 2005	2
Pacquiao vacates the title to stay at junior lightweight.
34	Mikey Garcia (def. Orlando Salido)	19 Jan – 24 Nov 2013	0
Garcia vacates the title to move up to junior lightweight.

== Junior featherweight ==
No.	Name	Reign	Defenses
1	Wilfredo Gómez (def. Nestor Jimenez)	9 Mar 1979 – May 1983	10
Gómez vacates the title to move up to featherweight.
2	Paulie Ayala (def. Bones Adams)	23 Feb 2002 – 5 May 2004	0
Ayala moved up to featherweight. The title is vacated on the 5 May 2004 ratings.
3	Israel Vázquez (def. Óscar Larios)	3 Dec 2005 – 3 Mar 2007	2
4	Rafael Márquez	3 Mar – 4 Aug 2007	0
5	Israel Vázquez (2)	4 Aug 2007 – 31 May 2009	1
Vázquez moves up to featherweight. The title is vacated on 31 May ratings.
6	Nonito Donaire (def. Toshiaki Nishioka)	13 Oct 2012 – 13 Apr 2013	1
7	Guillermo Rigondeaux	13 Apr 2013 – 9 Feb 2016	4
Rigondeaux is stripped of the title for failing to fight a top 5 contender in any division within 18 months per The Ring policy.
8	Naoya Inoue (def. Marlon Tapales)	26 Dec 2023 – present	7

== Bantamweight ==
No.	Name	Reign	Defenses
1	Eddie Martin (def. Abe Goldstein)	19 Dec 1924 – 20 Mar 1925	0
2	Charlie Phil Rosenberg	20 Mar 1925 – 4 Feb 1927	1
Rosenberg was stripped of the title for being overweight against Bushy Graham.
3	Panama Al Brown (def. Pete Sanstol)	25 Aug 1931 – 1 Jun 1935	7
4	Baltasar Sangchili	1 Jun 1935 – 29 Jun 1936	0
5	Tony Marino	29 Jun – 31 Aug 1936	0
6	Sixto Escobar	31 Aug 1936 – 23 Sep 1937	2
7	Harry Jeffra	23 Sep 1937 – 20 Feb 1938	0
8	Sixto Escobar (2)	20 Feb 1938 – 26 Oct 1939	0
Escobar vacates his title to move up to featherweight.
9	Lou Salica (def. Tommy Forte)	13 Jan 1941 – 7 Aug 1942	5
10	Manuel Ortiz	7 Aug 1942 – 6 Jan 1947	15
11	Harold Dade	6 Jan – 11 Mar 1947	0
12	Manuel Ortiz (2)	11 Mar 1947 – 31 May 1950	4
13	Vic Toweel	31 May 1950 – 15 Nov 1952	3
14	Jimmy Carruthers	15 Nov 1952 – 16 May 1954	3
Carruthers retires from boxing.
15	Robert Cohen (def. Chamroen Songkitrat)	19 Sep 1954 – 29 Jun 1956	1
16	Mario D'Agata	29 Jun 1956 – 1 Apr 1957	0
17	Alphonse Halimi	1 Apr 1957 – 8 Jul 1959	1
18	José Becerra	8 Jul 1959 – 30 Aug 1960	2
Becerra retires due to an eye injury.
19	Éder Jofre (def. Piero Rollo)	25 Mar 1961 – 17 May 1965	7
20	Fighting Harada	17 May 1965 – 26 Feb 1968	4
21	Lionel Rose	26 Feb 1968 – 22 Aug 1969	3
22	Rubén Olivares	22 Aug 1969 – 16 Oct 1970	2
23	Chucho Castillo	16 Oct 1970 – 2 Apr 1971	0
24	Rubén Olivares (2)	2 Apr 1971 – 19 Mar 1972	2
25	Rafael Herrera	19 Mar – 30 Jul 1972	0
26	Enrique Pinder	30 Jul 1972 – 20 Jan 1973	0
27	Romeo Anaya	20 Jan – 3 Nov 1973	2
28	Arnold Taylor	3 Nov 1973 – 3 Jul 1974	0
29	Hong Soo-Hwan	3 Jul 1974 – 14 Mar 1975	1
30	Alfonso Zamora	14 Mar 1975 – 19 Nov 1977	5
31	Jorge Luján	19 Nov 1977 – 29 Aug 1980	5
32	Julian Solís	29 Aug – 14 Nov 1980	0
33	Jeff Chandler	14 Nov 1980 – 7 Apr 1984	9
34	Richie Sandoval	7 Apr 1984 – 10 Mar 1986	2
35	Gaby Canizales	10 Mar – 4 Jun 1986	0
36	Bernardo Piñango	4 Jun 1986 – 13 Mar 1987	3
Piñango vacated his alphabet title to move up to junior featherweight.
37	Shinsuke Yamanaka (def. Anselmo Moreno)	16 Sep 2016 – 15 Aug 2017	1
38	Luis Nery	15 Aug – 26 Sep 2017	0
Nery tested positive for the banned substance of zilpaterol and is stripped of The Ring title however, he was not stripped of his WBC title, the fight was also not overturned into an NC. Yamanaka is reinstated.
39	Shinsuke Yamanaka (2) (reinstated)	26 Sep 2017 – 1 Mar 2018	0
Nery won against Yamanaka on their rematch, however he came in overweight for the fight, disqualifying him from winning the title. The title is declared vacant.
40	Naoya Inoue (def. Emmanuel Rodríguez)	18 May 2019 – 13 Jan 2023	6
Inoue vacates the title to move up to junior featherweight.
41	Junto Nakatani (def. Ryosuke Nishida)	8 Jun – 25 Sep 2025	0
Nakatani vacates the title to move up to junior featherweight.

== Junior bantamweight ==
No.	Name	Reign	Defenses
1	Srisaket Sor Rungvisai (def. Juan Francisco Estrada)	24 Feb 2018 – 26 Apr 2019	1
2	Juan Francisco Estrada	26 Apr 2019 – 29 Jun 2024	5
3	Jesse Rodriguez	29 Jun 2024 – 15 Jun 2026	3
Rodriguez vacated the title to stay at bantamweight.

== Flyweight ==
No.	Name	Reign	Defenses
1	Pancho Villa (def. Jimmy Wilde)	18 Jun 1923 – 14 Jul 1925	3
Title vacated because Villa died from Ludwig's angina resulting from an infection that spread to his throat.
2	Fidel LaBarba (def. Elky Clark)	21 Jan – 29 Aug 1927	0
LaBarba retired to attend Stanford College.
3	Benny Lynch (def. Small Montana)	19 Jan 1937 – 29 Jun 1938	1
Lynch was stripped when he failed to make weight for a title defense against Jackie Jurich.
4	Peter Kane (def. Jackie Jurich)	22 Sep 1938 – 1939	0
Kane was stripped of the title.
5	Jackie Paterson (def. Peter Kane)	19 June 1943 – 23 Mar 1948	1
6	Rinty Monaghan	23 March 1948 – 25 April 1950	3
Monaghan retires.
7	Terry Allen (def. Honore Pratesi)	25 Apr – 1 Aug 1950	0
8	Dado Marino	1 Aug 1950 – 19 May 1952	1
9	Yoshio Shirai	19 May 1952 – 26 Nov 1954	4
10	Pascual Perez	26 Nov 1954 – 16 Apr 1960	9
11	Pone Kingpetch	16 Apr 1960 – 10 Oct 1962	3
12	Fighting Harada	10 Oct 1962 – 12 Jan 1963	0
13	Pone Kingpetch (2)	12 Jan – 18 Sep 1963	0
14	Hiroyuki Ebihara	18 Sep 1963 – 23 Jan 1964	0
15	Pone Kingpetch (3)	23 Jan 1964 – 23 Apr 1965	0
16	Salvatore Burruni	23 Apr 1965 – 14 Jun 1966	1
17	Walter McGowan	14 Jun – 30 Dec 1966	0
18	Chartchai Chionoi	30 Dec 1966 – 23 Feb 1969	4
19	Efren Torres	23 Feb 1969 – 20 Mar 1970	1
20	Chartchai Chionoi (2)	20 Mar – 7 Dec 1970	0
21	Erbito Salavarria	7 Dec 1970 – 9 Feb 1973	3
22	Venice Borkhorsor	9 Feb – 10 Jul 1973	0
Borkhorsor vacated his WBC title to move up to bantamweight.
23	Miguel Canto (def. Shoji Oguma)	8 Jan 1975 – 18 Mar 1979	14
24	Park Chan-Hee	18 Mar 1979 – 18 May 1980	5
25	Shoji Oguma	18 May 1980 – 12 May 1981	3
26	Antonio Avelar	12 May 1981 – 20 Mar 1982	1
27	Prudencio Cardona	20 Mar – 24 Jul 1982	0
28	Freddy Castillo	24 Jul – 6 Nov 1982	0
29	Eleoncio Mercedes	6 Nov 1982 – 15 Mar 1983	0
30	Charlie Magri	15 Mar – 27 Sep 1983	0
31	Frank Cedeno	27 Sep 1983 – 18 Jan 1984	0
32	Kōji Kobayashi	18 Jan – 9 Apr 1984	0
33	Gabriel Bernal	9 Apr – 8 October 1984	1
34	Sot Chitalada	8 Oct 1984 – 24 Jul 1988	6
35	Kim Yong-Kang	24 Jul 1988 – 31 Dec 1989	1
New ownership discontinued under the championship policy during Kim's reign.
36	Pongsaklek Wonjongkam (def. Kōki Kameda)	27 Mar 2010 – 2 Mar 2012	4
37	Sonny Boy Jaro	2 Mar – 16 Jul 2012	0
38	Toshiyuki Igarashi	16 Jul 2012 – 8 Apr 2013	1
39	Akira Yaegashi	8 Apr 2013 – 5 Sep 2014	3
40	Román González	5 Sep 2014 – 1 Oct 2016	4
González vacated his title after moving up in weight and winning the WBC junior bantamweight world championship against Carlos Cuadras.

== Junior flyweight ==
No.	Name	Reign	Defenses
1	Rosendo Álvarez (def. Beibis Mendoza)	31 Mar 2003 – 2 Oct 2004	1
Álvarez was stripped of his title after coming in overweight before his rematch against Beibis Mendoza.
2	Hugo Cázares (def. Nelson Dieppa)	30 Sep 2006 – 25 Aug 2007	1
3	Iván Calderón	25 Aug 2007 – 28 Aug 2010	6
4	Giovani Segura	28 Aug 2010 – 12 Sep 2011	1
Segura vacates the title to move up to flyweight.
5	Donnie Nietes (def. Moisés Fuentes)	10 May 2014 – 3 Aug 2016	5
Nietes vacates the title to move up to flyweight.
6	Ryoichi Taguchi (def. Milan Melindo)	31 Dec 2017 – 20 May 2018	1
7	Hekkie Budler	20 May – 31 Dec 2018	0
8	Hiroto Kyoguchi	31 Dec 2018 – 1 Nov 2022	4
9	Kenshiro Teraji	1 Nov 2022 – 14 Oct 2024	3
Teraji’s title was vacated in the rankings after winning the vacant WBC flyweight title.

== Strawweight ==
No.	Name	Date	Defenses
1	Oscar Collazo (def. Knockout CP Freshmart)	16 Nov 2024 – present	3

== See also ==
- The Ring
- List of The Ring female world champions
- Lineal championship
- List of current world boxing champions
- List of current female world boxing champions
- List of undisputed world boxing champions
- List of WBA world champions
- List of WBC world champions
- List of IBF world champions
- List of WBO world champions
- List of NYSAC world champions
- List of IBO world champions
- Current The Ring pound for pound list
- List of The Ring pound for pound rankings
