= The Ring magazine Progress of the Year =

The Ring magazine was established in 1922 and gave an award for Progress of the Year from 1953 to 1988. It is given to a boxer who had made significant progress during the preceding year, or had otherwise made the most impressive jump from comparative obscurity to international prominence.

1953 – Nino Valdes
1954 – Pascual Perez
1955 – Chuck Spieser
1956 – Eddie Machen
1957 – Roy Harris (boxer)
1958 – Don Jordan
1959 – Charley Scott
1960 – Giulio Rinaldi
1961:
1962:
1963:
1964 – Vicente Saldivar
1965 – Alan Rudkin
1966 – Joe Frazier
1967 – Jimmy Ellis
1968 – Shozo Saijo
1969 – Mac Foster
1970 – George Foreman
1971 – Chris Finnegan
1972 – Bert Nabalatan
1973 – Santos Luis Rivera
1974 – Soo-Hwan Hong
1975 – Mike Colbert
1976 – Ruben Castillo
1977 – Eddie Gazo
1978 – Leon Spinks
1979 – Chan-Hee Park
1980 –
1981 –
1982 –
1983 – John Mugabi
1984 – Francisco Quiroz
1985 – Lonnie Smith
1986 – Samart Payakaroon
1987 – Kelvin Seabrooks
1988 – Michael Nunn
