= Turori George =

Cook Island/New Zealand boxer

Toro George
Personal information
- Nationality: Cook Islander/New Zealander
- Born: Turori George; 8 August 1943 (age 83) Rarotonga, Cook Islands
- Height: 5 ft 7 in (1.70 m)
- Weight: feather/super featherweight

Boxing career
- Stance: Orthodox

Boxing record
- Total fights: 54
- Wins: 36 (KO 11)
- Losses: 15 (KO 0)
- Draws: 3
Medal record
Representing New Zealand
Men's boxing
British Empire and Commonwealth Games
Bronze medal – third place	1962 Perth	Featherweight

Turori George (born 8 August 1943 in Aitutaki, Cook Islands), also known as Toro George, is a Cook Islander/New Zealander amateur featherweight and professional feather/super featherweight boxer of the 1960s and 1970s. In 1969 George fought reigning World Junior Lightweight champion Hiroshi Kobayashi (boxer) losing a ten-round decision in Japan. In 1971 George lost a ten-round decision to future World Bantamweight champion Arnold Taylor. Also in 1971 in Melbourne George successfully defended his Commonwealth Featherweight championship with a 15-round decision over British champion Evan Armstrong maybe his finest performance.

As an amateur, he won a bronze medal at featherweight, losing to eventual silver medal winner Ali Juma of Kenya in the 1962 British Empire and Commonwealth Games. As a professional, he won the New Zealand Boxing Association featherweight title, Australasian featherweight title, and Commonwealth featherweight title, his professional fighting weight varied from 123 3/4 lb (56.1 kg; 8 st 11.8 lb), i.e. featherweight to 130 3/4 lb (59.3 kg; 9 st 4.8 lb), i.e. super featherweight.
