= Vernon Sollas =

Scottish boxer (born 1954)

Personal information
- Nationality: British
- Born: 14 August 1954 (age 71)
- Weight: Featherweight

Boxing career

Boxing record
- Total fights: 33
- Wins: 25
- Win by KO: 21
- Losses: 7
- Draws: 1

Vernon Sollas (born 14 August 1954) is a Scottish former boxer, businessman and music manager, who was British featherweight champion between 1975 and 1977.

== Career ==
Sollas was from Edinburgh. His father (also called Vernon) was also a boxer; he came to Britain in 1948 from Jamaica on the well-known voyage of the Empire Windrush. He was one of a number of Jamaican boxers being brought to Britain by the promoter Mortimer 'Buddy’ Martin.

The younger Vernon Sollas fought as an amateur out of the Madison ABC, and in 1972 finished runner-up to Kirkland Laing in the ABA featherweight (51 kg) final. He turned professional in 1973 and moved base to London where he was managed by former British champion Bobby Neill, stopping John O'Rawe in his debut in February. He fought eight more times that year, including wins over Albert Amatler and Bashew Sibaca, losing only once, to George McGurk. In March 1974 he faced Jimmy Revie in a British featherweight title eliminator at the Royal Albert Hall. The fight went the full ten rounds with Revie getting the decision. He beat Sibaca again in May and in June faced British champion Evan Armstrong in a non-title fight, losing by knockout in the eighth round.

When Armstrong relinquished, Sollas was matched with Revie for the vacant title in March 1975 at the Royal Albert Hall. Sollas avenged his earlier loss, knocking Revie out in the fourth round to become British champion, at 18 years old the youngest-ever Scot to win the title.

In January 1976, Sollas won the boxing writers' 'Best Young Boxer of the Year (1975)' award.

Sollas won his next five fights, all inside the distance, and in February 1976, after being named number one challenger by the EBU, fought for Elio Cotena's European title at the York Hall, Bethnal Green. Cotena stopped him in the fourteenth round to retain the title.

Sollas won his next five, including a third round stoppage of Tommy Glencross and a win over Arnold Taylor, before being stopped in February 1977 by Les Pickett. In March that year he lost the British title in his first defence, Alan Richardson stopping him in the eighth round at Leeds Town Hall.

In July 1977, Sollas faced Dave Needham at the Wolverhampton Civic Hall. Needham knocked Sollas out in the seventh round, with Sollas unconscious for almost 15 minutes before being taken to hospital. Sollas recovered fully but announced his retirement later that night. In 33 professional fights, Sollas won 25, 21 inside the distance.

He later became a businessman based in London, including managing rock bands.
