= Hong Soo-hwan =

South Korean boxer (born 1950)

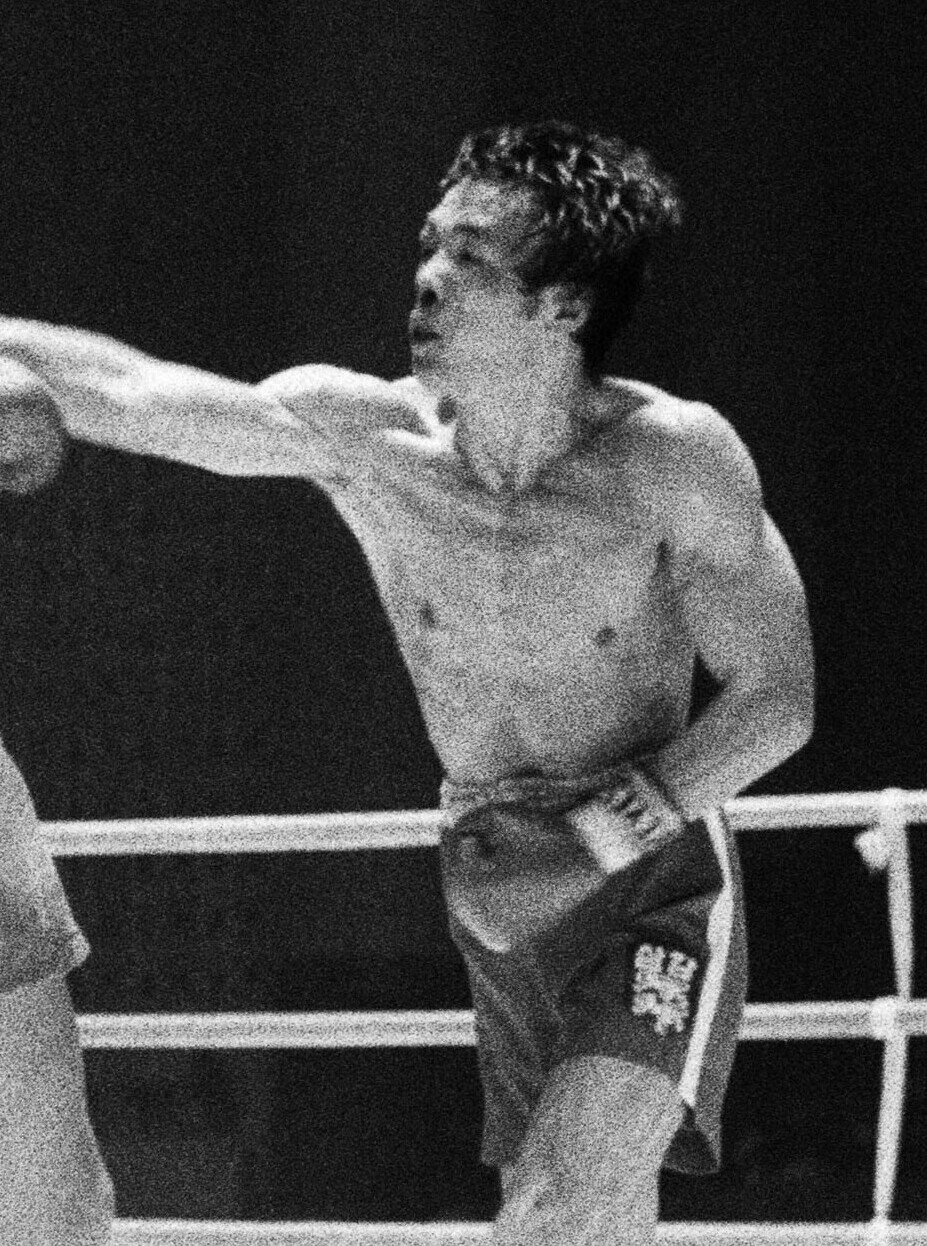
- Hong in 1976

Personal information
- Born: 홍수환; May 26, 1950 (age 76) Seoul, South Korea
- Height: 5 ft 7 in (170 cm)
- Weight: Bantamweight; Super-bantamweight

Boxing career
- Reach: 66 1/2 in (169 cm)
- Stance: Orthodox

Boxing record
- Total fights: 50
- Wins: 41
- Win by KO: 14
- Losses: 5
- Draws: 4

Hong Soo-hwan (Korean: 홍수환, born May 26, 1950) is a South Korean former professional boxer who competed between 1969 and 1980. He is a world champion in two weight classes, having held the World Boxing Association (WBA) and Ring magazine bantamweight titles from 1974 to 1975, and the WBA super-bantamweight title from 1977 to 1978.

== Professional career ==
Hong turned pro in 1969. In 1974, he won the WBA and The Ring bantamweight titles with a decision win over Arnold Taylor. During the fight, Taylor was knocked down in the 1st, 5th, and 14th rounds. Hong lost the title in his second defense to Alfonso Zamora in 1975. In 1977, he won the vacant WBA super bantamweight title by knocking out Hector Carrasquilla in the 3rd round. Despite being knocked down four times in the second round, Hong made a comeback and won in the following round. He lost the title in his second defense to Ricardo Cardona in 1978.

== Professional boxing record ==
50 fights	41 wins	5 losses
By knockout	14	3
By decision	27	2
Draws	4	

No.	Result	Record	Opponent	Type	Round	Date	Location	Notes
50	Draw	41–5–4	Yum Dong-Kyun	PTS	10	Dec 19, 1980	Jangchung Gymnasium, Seoul, South Korea	
49	Loss	41–5–3	Ricardo Cardona	TKO	12 (15), 1:23	May 6, 1978	Jangchung Gymnasium, Seoul, South Korea	Lost WBA super-bantamweight title
48	Win	41–4–3	Yu Kasahara	UD	15	Feb 1, 1978	Ryōgoku Kokugikan, Tokyo, Japan	Retained WBA super-bantamweight title
47	Win	40–4–3	Hector Carrasquilla	KO	3 (15), 1:04	Nov 26, 1977	Gimnasio Nuevo Panama, Panama City, Panama	Won inaugural WBA super-bantamweight title
46	Win	39–4–3	Futaro Tanaka	PTS	12	Oct 10, 1977	Jangchung Gymnasium, Seoul, South Korea	
45	Win	38–4–3	Yum Dong-Kyun	PTS	12	Jun 27, 1977	Seoul, South Korea	
44	Win	37–4–3	Conrado Vasquez	UD	10	Mar 15, 1977	Blaisdell Center Arena, Honolulu, Hawaii, U.S.	
43	Loss	36–4–3	Alfonso Zamora	TKO	12 (15), 2:50	Oct 16, 1976	Sunin Gymnasium, Incheon, South Korea	For WBA and The Ring bantamweight titles
42	Draw	36–3–3	Ric Quijano	PTS	10	Aug 21, 1976	Busan, South Korea	
41	Win	36–3–2	Venice Borkhorsor	PTS	12	May 30, 1976	Busan, South Korea	Won vacant OPBF bantamweight title
40	Win	35–3–2	Sutan Rambing	KO	6 (10), 1:51	Apr 6, 1976	Seoul, South Korea	
39	Win	34–3–2	Tinkajorn Dejkajorn	KO	6 (10), 2:34	Mar 28, 1976	Incheon, South Korea	
38	Win	33–3–2	Shinobu Fujita	KO	4 (10)	Feb 29, 1976	Busan, South Korea	
37	Win	32–3–2	Edwin Alarcon	TKO	4 (10)	Feb 22, 1976	Busan, South Korea	
36	Win	31–3–2	Wittaya Pleonjit	KO	4 (10), 2:17	Nov 29, 1975	Incheon, South Korea	
35	Win	30–3–2	Orlando Amores	PTS	10	Aug 30, 1975	Jangchung Gymnasium, Seoul, South Korea	
34	Win	29–3–2	John Meza	KO	2 (12), 1:47	May 21, 1975	Jangchung Gymnasium, Seoul, South Korea	
33	Loss	28–3–2	Alfonso Zamora	KO	4 (15), 2:27	Mar 14, 1975	The Forum, Inglewood, California, U.S.	Lost WBA and The Ring bantamweight titles
32	Win	28–2–2	Fernando Cabanela	SD	15	Dec 28, 1974	Jangchung Gymnasium, Seoul, South Korea	Retained WBA and The Ring bantamweight titles
31	Win	27–2–2	Noboru Konuma	PTS	12	Oct 27, 1974	Busan, South Korea	
30	Win	26–2–2	Genzo Kurosawa	PTS	12	Sep 22, 1974	Jangchung Gymnasium, Seoul, South Korea	
29	Win	25–2–2	Arnold Taylor	UD	15	Jul 3, 1974	West Ridge Tennis Stadium, Durban, South Africa	Won WBA and The Ring bantamweight titles
28	Win	24–2–2	Go Mifune	PTS	12	Apr 20, 1974	Gudeok Gymnasium, Busan, South Korea	
27	Win	23–2–2	Seiichi Watanuki	PTS	12	Feb 3, 1974	Daegu, South Korea	Retained OPBF bantamweight title
26	Win	22–2–2	Eddie Saloma	PTS	12	Nov 24, 1973	Daegu, South Korea	Won vacant OPBF bantamweight title
25	Win	21–2–2	Berkrerk Chartvanchai	PTS	10	Oct 7, 1973	Busan, South Korea	
24	Win	20–2–2	Susumu Inoue	KO	3 (10), 2:03	Aug 19, 1973	Jangchung Gymnasium, Seoul, South Korea	
23	Win	19–2–2	Thanomchit Sukhothai	TKO	8 (10), 1:46	Feb 9, 1973	Kittikachorn Stadium, Bangkok, Thailand	
22	Win	18–2–2	Ushiwakamaru Harada	PTS	10	Nov 26, 1972	Jangchung Gymnasium, Seoul, South Korea	
21	Win	17–2–2	Shigeyoshi Oki	PTS	12	Oct 1, 1972	Seoul, South Korea	Retained OPBF bantamweight title
20	Win	16–2–2	Kenji Endo	KO	1 (10), 1:46	Aug 6, 1972	Seoul, South Korea	
19	Win	15–2–2	Al Diaz	UD	12	Jun 4, 1972	Jangchung Gymnasium, Seoul, South Korea	Won vacant OPBF bantamweight title
18	Win	14–2–2	Moon Jung-Ho	PTS	10	Apr 2, 1972	Busan, South Korea	Retained South Korean bantamweight title
17	Win	13–2–2	Bae Kil-Je	PTS	10	Mar 12, 1972	Jangchung Gymnasium, Seoul, South Korea	Retained South Korean bantamweight title
16	Win	12–2–2	Park Young-Sup	KO	4 (10), 3:05	Jan 15, 1972	Jangchung Gymnasium, Seoul, South Korea	Retained South Korean bantamweight title
15	Loss	11–2–2	Colley Saloma	PTS	10	Dec 12, 1971	Agana, Guam	
14	Win	11–1–2	Saturnino Ortega	PTS	10	Nov 7, 1971	Jangchung Gymnasium, Seoul, South Korea	
13	Win	10–1–2	Moon Jung-Ho	KO	5 (10), 2:32	Sep 14, 1971	Jangchung Gymnasium, Seoul, South Korea	Won South Korean bantamweight title
12	Win	9–1–2	Jang Kyu-Chul	PTS	10	Dec 1, 1970	Jangchung Gymnasium, Seoul, South Korea	
11	Win	8–1–2	Shin Hae-Shu	PTS	8	Oct 17, 1970	Seoul, South Korea	
10	Win	7–1–2	Shintaro Oshima	KO	1 (10), 2:13	Aug 8, 1970	Yokohama, Kanagawa, Japan	
9	Loss	6–1–2	Ushiwakamaru Harada	PTS	10	Jun 9, 1970	Ōita, Ōita, Japan	
8	Draw	6–0–2	Shin Chul-Ho	PTS	10	Apr 19, 1970	Daegu, South Korea	
7	Win	6–0–1	Shin Hae-Shu	PTS	6	Mar 3, 1970	Seoul, South Korea	
6	Win	5–0–1	Baek Rak-Ki	PTS	4	Oct 6, 1969	Seoul, South Korea	
5	Win	4–0–1	Kim Yong-Tae	KO	1 (4), 1:56	Aug 7, 1969	Seoul, South Korea	
4	Win	3–0–1	Ju Hong-Taek	PTS	4	Jul 12, 1969	Jangchung Gymnasium, Seoul, South Korea	
3	Win	2–0–1	Park Young-Sap	PTS	4	Jun 21, 1969	Jangchung Gymnasium, Seoul, South Korea	
2	Win	1–0–1	Choi Chang-Soo	PTS	4	Jun 3, 1969	Jangchung Gymnasium, Seoul, South Korea	
1	Draw	0–0–1	Kim Sang-Il	PTS	4	May 10, 1969	Jangchung Gymnasium, Seoul, South Korea	

== Titles in boxing ==
=== Major world titles ===
- WBA bantamweight champion (118 lbs)
- WBA super-bantamweight champion (122 lbs)

=== The Ring magazine titles ===
- The Ring bantamweight champion (118 lbs)

=== Regional/International titles ===
- South Korean bantamweight champion (118 lbs)
- OPBF bantamweight champion (118 lbs) (3x)

== Honors ==
Hong was named The Ring's Progress of the Year fighter for 1974.

== See also ==
- List of bantamweight boxing champions
- List of super-bantamweight boxing champions

Sporting positions
World boxing titles
Preceded by Arnold Taylor	WBA bantamweight champion July 3, 1974 – March 14, 1975	Succeeded by Alfonso Zamora
Preceded by Arnold Taylor	The Ring bantamweight champion July 3, 1974 – March 14, 1975	Succeeded by Alfonso Zamora
Inaugural Champion	WBA super-bantamweight champion November 26, 1977 – May 7, 1978	Succeeded by Ricardo Cardona
Awards
Previous: Santos Luis Rivera	The Ring Progress of the Year; 1974	Next: Mike Colbert
