= Clemente Sánchez =

Mexican boxer

Personal information
- Nickname: Xicotencatl
- Born: July 9, 1947 Monterrey, Mexico
- Died: December 25, 1978 (aged 31) Monterrey, Mexico
- Weight: Featherweight

Boxing career
- Stance: Orthodox

Boxing record
- Total fights: 59
- Wins: 45
- Win by KO: 29
- Losses: 11
- Draws: 3

Clemente "Xicoténcatl" Sánchez (9 July 1947 – 25 December 1978) was a Mexican professional boxer.

== Professional career ==
Sánchez turned professional in 1963 and won the Lineal and WBC featherweight title with a 3rd-round knockout over Kuniaki Shibata in 1972. He lost the title in his first defense by a technical knockout to Jose Legra, but Sanchez had been stripped of his WBC belt after failing to make weight prior to the fight. He retired in 1975.

== Death ==
Sánchez was shot and killed in his home city of Monterrey in a traffic dispute in 1978, by a man who later identified himself to police as Carlos Rodriguez Treviño.

== Professional boxing record ==
59 fights	45 wins	11 losses
By knockout	29	1
By decision	14	10
By disqualification	2	0
Draws	3	

No.	Result	Record	Opponent	Type	Round	Date	Location	Notes
59	Loss	45–11–3	Alvaro Rojas	UD	10	Aug 24, 1975	Plaza de Toros Monumental, Monterrey, Mexico	
58	Win	45–10–3	Ramiro Bolanos	PTS	10	Jul 13, 1975	Monterrey, Mexico	
57	Win	44–10–3	Hector Munoz	PTS	10	May 2, 1975	Reynosa, Mexico	
56	Win	43–10–3	Juventino Castillo	KO	3 (?)	Apr 22, 1975	Rio Bravo, Mexico	
55	Win	42–10–3	Isaac Marin	TKO	3 (10)	Aug 31, 1974	Plaza de Toros Monumental, Monterrey, Mexico	
54	Win	41–10–3	Jose Luis Meza	DQ	5 (?)	Aug 11, 1974	La Paz, Mexico	
53	Loss	40–10–3	Victor Ortiz	PTS	10	Jul 8, 1974	San Juan, Puerto Rico	
52	Win	40–9–3	Cornelio Vega	TKO	3 (10)	Jun 30, 1974	Plaza de Toros Monumental, Matamoros, Mexico	
51	Loss	39–9–3	José Legrá	TKO	10 (15)	Dec 16, 1972	Plaza de Toros Monumental, Monterrey, Mexico	WBC featherweight title; Title only at stake for Legrá (overweight)
50	Loss	39–8–3	Enrique Garcia	UD	10	Aug 12, 1972	Monterrey, Mexico	
49	Win	39–7–3	Kuniaki Shibata	KO	3 (15)	May 19, 1972	Nihon University Auditorium, Japan	Won WBC and The Ring featherweight titles
48	Win	38–7–3	Joaquin Ulloa	KO	2 (?)	Dec 21, 1971	Valles, Mexico	
47	Win	37–7–3	Tahar Ben Hassen	TKO	8 (10)	Nov 20, 1971	Plaza de Toros Monumental, Monterrey, Mexico	
46	Win	36–7–3	Monico Martinez	TKO	5 (10)	Oct 31, 1971	Saltillo, Mexico	
45	Win	35–7–3	Jose Jimenez	TKO	3 (10)	Sep 25, 1971	Monterrey, Mexico	
44	Win	34–7–3	Armando Muliz	KO	5 (?)	Aug 3, 1971	Monclova, Mexico	
43	Win	33–7–3	Johnny Bean	KO	2 (?)	Jun 16, 1971	Monterrey, Mexico	
42	Win	32–7–3	Jesse Lara	KO	4 (?)	Mar 8, 1971	Piedras Negras, Mexico	
41	Draw	31–7–3	Love Allotey	PTS	10	Dec 25, 1970	Monterrey, Mexico	
40	Win	31–7–2	Fernando Sotelo	TKO	7 (?)	Nov 22, 1970	Monterrey, Mexico	
39	Win	30–7–2	Raul Cruz	TKO	5 (10)	Jun 28, 1970	Plaza de Toros Monumental, Monterrey, Mexico	
38	Win	29–7–2	Pedro Cruz	KO	3 (?)	Apr 17, 1970	Monclova, Mexico	
37	Win	28–7–2	Jose Valenzuela	KO	4 (10)	Feb 28, 1970	Plaza de Toros Monumental, Monterrey, Mexico	
36	Win	27–7–2	Rogelio Fernandez	TKO	5 (10)	Jan 17, 1970	Plaza de Toros Monumental, Monterrey, Mexico	
35	Win	26–7–2	Ramon Hernandez	KO	1 (?)	Nov 15, 1969	Plaza de Toros Monumental, Monterrey, Mexico	
34	Loss	25–7–2	Miguel Riasco	PTS	6 (10)	Sep 14, 1969	Plaza de Toros Monumental, Monterrey, Mexico	
33	Win	25–6–2	Raul Vega	DQ	6 (10)	Jun 28, 1969	Monterrey, Mexico	
32	Win	24–6–2	Raul Vega	KO	3 (10)	May 1, 1969	Plaza de Toros Monumental, Monterrey, Mexico	
31	Win	23–6–2	Chocolate Zambrano	TKO	7 (10)	Mar 22, 1969	Monterrey, Mexico	
30	Win	22–6–2	German Bastidas	TKO	6 (?)	Mar 8, 1969	Monterrey, Mexico	
29	Win	21–6–2	Chicharito Martinez	TKO	4 (?)	Jan 26, 1969	Rosita, Mexico	
28	Win	20–6–2	Jesus Rodriguez	TKO	1 (?)	Jan 12, 1969	Nuevo Rosita, Mexico	
27	Win	19–6–2	Santos Sandoval	KO	5 (12)	Dec 28, 1968	Monterrey, Mexico	Won Nuevo Leon State Bantamweight Title
26	Win	18–6–2	Cubano Gonzalez	TKO	4 (?)	Nov 9, 1968	Monterrey, Mexico	
25	Win	17–6–2	Manuel Barajas	KO	5 (?)	Oct 19, 1968	Monterrey, Mexico	
24	Win	16–6–2	Federico Palomares	TKO	2 (?)	Sep 21, 1968	Monterrey, Mexico	
23	Win	15–6–2	Ramon Reyes	TKO	1 (10)	Jun 22, 1968	Monterrey, Mexico	
22	Win	14–6–2	Pimi Amador	KO	3 (?)	May 3, 1968	San Nicolas, Mexico	
21	Loss	13–6–2	Rogelio Lara	PTS	10	Apr 5, 1968	Auditorio Matamoros, Matamoros, Mexico	
20	Loss	13–5–2	Rogelio Lara	PTS	10	Mar 8, 1968	Auditorio Matamoros, Matamoros, Mexico	
19	Win	13–4–2	Manuel Flores	KO	5 (?)	Feb 17, 1968	Monterrey, Mexico	
18	Win	12–4–2	Ricardo Arredondo	PTS	10	Aug 4, 1967	Nuevo Laredo, Mexico	
17	Loss	11–4–2	Jesus Rocha	PTS	10	Apr 22, 1967	Monterrey, Mexico	
16	Draw	11–3–2	Rocky Garcia	PTS	10	Mar 4, 1967	Monterrey, Mexico	
15	Loss	11–3–1	Raul Montoya	PTS	10	Jun 25, 1966	Monterrey, Mexico	
14	Win	11–2–1	Chocolate Zambrano	PTS	10	Mar 19, 1966	Arena Coliseo, Monterrey, Mexico	
13	Win	10–2–1	Chilango Gomez	PTS	10	Feb 19, 1966	Arena Coliseo, Guadalajara, Mexico	
12	Win	9–2–1	Lupe Mendez	PTS	10	Feb 5, 1966	Monterrey, Mexico	
11	Win	8–2–1	Gallito Camacho	PTS	10	Dec 2, 1965	Monterrey, Mexico	
10	Win	7–2–1	Luis Briones	PTS	10	Oct 16, 1965	Monterrey, Mexico	
9	Loss	6–2–1	Santos Sandoval	PTS	12	Jul 31, 1965	Monterrey, Mexico	
8	Win	6–1–1	Rocky Garcia	PTS	10	Apr 10, 1965	Arena Coliseo, Monterrey, Mexico	
7	Win	5–1–1	Ardilla Garcia	UD	10	Jul 3, 1964	Arena Carta Blanca, Matamoros, Mexico	
6	Win	4–1–1	Ubaldo Cruz	PTS	6	Jul 25, 1963	Monterrey, Mexico	
5	Draw	3–1–1	Chuy Rodriguez	PTS	10	Jun 30, 1963	Saltillo, Mexico	
4	Win	3–1	Ramon Garza	PTS	8	Jun 16, 1963	Salinas, Mexico	
3	Loss	2–1	Frankie Gutierrez	PTS	10	May 30, 1963	Saltillo, Mexico	
2	Win	2–0	Panchito Flores	PTS	4	May 17, 1963	Monterrey, Mexico	
1	Win	1–0	Antonio Herrera	PTS	6	Mar 23, 1963	Monterrey, Mexico	

== See also ==
- List of Mexican boxing world champions
- List of world featherweight boxing champions
- Lineal championship

Sporting positions
World boxing titles
Preceded by Kuniaki Shibata	WBC featherweight champion 19 May 1972 - 15 December 1972; Stripped, did not make weight	Vacant Title next held by José Legrá
Preceded by Kuniaki Shibata	The Ring featherweight champion 19 May 1972 - 15 December 1972; Stripped, did not make weight	Vacant Title next held by Alexis Argüello
