= Johnny Famechon =

French and Australian boxer (1945–2022)

Johnny Famechon AM
Personal information
- Nationality: Australian
- Born: Jean-Pierre Famechon; 28 March 1945 Paris, France
- Died: 4 August 2022 (aged 77) Melbourne, Australia
- Height: 5 ft 5 in (165 cm)
- Weight: Featherweight

Boxing career
- Stance: Orthodox

Boxing record
- Total fights: 67
- Wins: 56
- Win by KO: 20
- Losses: 5
- Draws: 6

Jean-Pierre Famechon AM (28 March 1945 – 4 August 2022) was a French and Australian featherweight boxer.

Famechon was the 2003 Inductee for the Australian National Boxing Hall of Fame Moderns category and was the third to be elevated to Legend status in 2012.

== Early life and boxing career ==
Famechon was born in Paris, France to French parents. He and his mother, father and younger brother moved from Paris to Ferntree Gully, Victoria, Australia a suburb of Melbourne, in 1950 when he was five. The family then moved to Middle Park another suburb of Melbourne. His mother Antoinette and younger brother Christian moved to Paris a couple of years later; John and his father Andre then moved to Richmond.

Famechon attended Salesian College (Rupertswood) and later Essendon Technical School. He met his wife Elise (née Alves), and they married at St Brigid's Church in Mordialloc in 1970. They moved to Aspendale and later Frankston and had their first child Paul in 1972, and daughter Danielle in 1974.

Famechon came from a boxing family. His father Andre won the French lightweight championship. His uncle Ray Famechon was a European Boxing Union Champion twice, French featherweight champion and fought for the World Featherweight Title. Another uncle was French flyweight champion Emile. Other uncles Alfred and Lucien were also professional boxers.

Famechon never fought as an amateur and turned professional at age 16. He was trained by Ambrose Palmer throughout his professional career. Over his twenty-year career Famechon developed a reputation for being a skilled boxer whose strength was his defence. His career record was 56 wins (20 by KO), 6 draws and 5 losses.

His first major win was over Les Dunn to become Victorian Featherweight champion in 1964, then he was Commonwealth featherweight champion in 1967 after defeating the Scot John O'Brien. He became Lineal and WBC featherweight champion on 21 January 1969 after he defeated the Cuban José Legrá on points at the Albert Hall in London.

Famechon defended his WBC featherweight title against Fighting Harada of Japan and won in a controversial points decision. In the rematch for the world title, against Harada in Japan six months later, Famechon decisively won by knocking out Harada in the fourteenth round.

He defended his WBC title on 9 May 1970 in Rome to Mexican Vicente Saldivar and after losing the fight in a close points decision, he retired soon afterwards.

== Boxing style ==
Famechon was known for his hit and don't get hit style of boxing. His defense is often compared to that of Floyd Mayweather Jr.

Famechon's style, like Mayweather's Crab style, consisted of a low lead hand and a high rear hand. The key difference being that Famechon held his rear hand in a cross guard position with the glove open to catch punches. Famechon's defense also included ducking and slipping punches.

Famechon's offensive relied heavily on the use of the lead left hand. Famechon's style was developed by his trainer and is the topic of a book co-written by Famechon titled, The Method: Fammo's Tribute to the King - Ambrose Palmer.

== Later life ==
Famechon received the Keys To The City in 1969 on his return to Australia after his World Title win against Jose Legra in London.

Famechon was the first Melburnian to become King of Moomba in 1970 when appointed by the Moomba Festival festival committee.

In 1971, he and long time friend Frank Quill, wrote his autobiography, Fammo.

Famechon was inducted into the Sport Australia Hall of Fame in 1985. He was inducted into the International Boxing Hall of Fame in Los Angeles in 1997. He also was inducted to the Australian National Boxing Hall of Fame in 2003 and to the Frankston Hall of Fame in 2008. In 2013 the Australian National Boxing Hall of Fame elevated him to Legend status.

In 1991 he was badly injured when hit by a car outside Sydney's Warwick Farm racecourse, which resulted in horrific injuries and sustained an acquired brain injury and a stroke. In December 1993 Famechon commenced a new complex brain-based multi-movement therapy rehabilitation program that resulted in his return to a near normal life some 10–12 weeks after the therapy began.

Famechon now has a bronze statue in his home town of Frankston and is only the third Australian boxer to be honoured in this way after Les Darcy and Lionel Rose.

He was appointed a Member of the Order of Australia (AM) in the 2022 Queen's Birthday Honours for significant service to boxing at the elite level.

Famechon died in Melbourne on 4 August 2022 at the age of 77.

== Professional boxing record ==
67 fights	56 wins	5 losses
By knockout	20	0
By decision	35	5
By disqualification	1	0
Draws	6	

No.	Result	Record	Opponent	Type	Round, time	Date	Location	Notes
67	Loss	56–5–6	Vicente Saldívar	UD	15	9 May 1970	PalaEur, Rome, Italy	Lost WBC and The Ring featherweight titles
66	Win	56–4–6	Arnold Taylor	PTS	10	11 Apr 1970	Ellis Park Tennis Stadium, Johannesburg, South Africa	
65	Win	55–4–6	Fighting Harada	KO	14 (15), 1:09	6 Jan 1970	Metropolitan Gym, Tokyo, Japan	Retained WBC and The Ring featherweight titles
64	Win	54–4–6	Pete Gonzalez	KO	3 (10)	9 Dec 1969	Royal Albert Hall, London, England	
63	Win	53–4–6	Miguel Herrera	PTS	10	11 Nov 1969	Royal Albert Hall, London, England	
62	Win	52–4–6	Fighting Harada	PTS	15	28 Jul 1969	Sydney Stadium, Sydney, Australia	Retained WBC and The Ring featherweight titles
61	Win	51–4–6	Jimmy Anderson	PTS	10	20 May 1969	Royal Albert Hall, London, England	
60	Win	50–4–6	Giovanni Girgenti	PTS	10	21 Apr 1969	Hilton Hotel Mayfair, London, England	
59	Win	49–4–6	José Jiménez	PTS	10	21 Mar 1969	Festival Hall, Melbourne, Australia	
58	Win	48–4–6	José Legrá	PTS	15	21 Jan 1969	Royal Albert Hall, London, England	Won WBC and vacant The Ring featherweight titles
57	Win	47–4–6	Nevio Carbi	PTS	10	18 Oct 1968	Festival Hall, Melbourne, Australia	
56	Win	46–4–6	Billy McGrandle	TKO	12 (15)	13 Sep 1968	Festival Hall, Melbourne, Australia	Retained Commonwealth British Empire featherweight title; Recognized im Australia only as for Famechon's World featherweight title claim
55	Win	45–4–6	Vincenzo Pitardi	PTS	10	26 Jul 1968	Festival Hall, Melbourne, Australia	
54	Win	44–4–6	Freddie Rengifo	TKO	10 (10), 1:07	1 Jul 1968	Sydney Stadium, Sydney, Australia	
53	Win	43–4–6	Bobby Valdez	DQ	13 (15), 1:47	20 May 1968	Sydney Stadium, Sydney, Australia	Recognized in Australia only as for the vacant World featherweight title
52	Win	42–4–6	Antonio Herrera	PTS	10	5 Apr 1968	Festival Hall, Melbourne, Australia	
51	Draw	41–4–6	René Roque	PTS	10	11 Mar 1968	Palais des Sports, Paris, France	
50	Win	41–4–5	Isao Ichihara	PTS	10	16 Feb 1968	Festival Hall, Melbourne, Australia	
49	Win	40–4–5	John O'Brien	TKO	11 (15)	24 Nov 1967	Festival Hall, Melbourne, Australia	Won Commonwealth British Empire featherweight title
48	Win	39–4–5	Michel Houdeau	TKO	6 (10)	20 Oct 1967	Festival Hall, Melbourne, Australia	
47	Win	38–4–5	Don Johnson	PTS	10	22 Sep 1967	Festival Hall, Melbourne, Australia	
46	Win	37–4–5	Gilberto Biondi	PTS	10	21 Jul 1967	Festival Hall, Melbourne, Australia	
45	Win	36–4–5	James Skelton	PTS	10	7 Jul 1967	Festival Hall, Melbourne, Australia	
44	Win	35–4–5	Lothar Abend	PTS	10	26 May 1967	Festival Hall, Melbourne, Australia	
43	Win	34–4–5	Roberto Wong	PTS	10	14 Apr 1967	Festival Hall, Melbourne, Australia	
42	Win	33–4–5	Andrea Silanos	KO	2 (10)	3 Mar 1967	Festival Hall, Melbourne, Australia	
41	Win	32–4–5	Giovanni Girgenti	PTS	10	20 Jan 1967	Festival Hall, Melbourne, Australia	
40	Draw	31–4–5	Giovanni Girgenti	PTS	10	9 Dec 1966	Festival Hall, Melbourne, Australia	
39	Win	31–4–4	José Caetano dos Santos	PTS	10	7 Oct 1966	Festival Hall, Melbourne, Australia	
38	Draw	30–4–4	Domenico Chiloiro	PTS	12	10 Jun 1966	Festival Hall, Melbourne, Australia	
37	Win	30–4–3	Noel Kunde	TKO	4 (12), 2:05	4 May 1966	Festival Hall, Brisbane, Australia	
36	Win	29–4–3	Domenico Chiloiro	PTS	15	1 Apr 1966	Festival Hall, Melbourne, Australia	Retained Australian featherweight title
35	Win	28–4–3	Noel Kunde	TKO	8 (12)	11 Mar 1966	Festival Hall, Brisbane, Australia	
34	Win	27–4–3	Carmelo Coscia	PTS	12	25 Feb 1966	Festival Hall, Melbourne, Australia	
33	Win	26–4–3	Mario Sitri	PTS	12	11 Feb 1966	Festival Hall, Melbourne, Australia	
32	Loss	25–4–3	Gilberto Biondi	PTS	12	29 Oct 1965	Festival Hall, Melbourne, Australia	
31	Win	25–3–3	Harold Hopkins	TKO	4 (12)	15 Oct 1965	Festival Hall, Melbourne, Australia	
30	Win	24–3–3	Max Murphy	KO	7 (15)	24 Sep 1965	Festival Hall, Melbourne, Australia	Retained Australian featherweight title
29	Loss	23–3–3	Max Murphy	PTS	12	19 Jun 1965	Sydney Stadium, Sydney, Australia	
28	Win	23–2–3	Singtong Por Tor	PTS	12	11 Jun 1965	Festival Hall, Melbourne, Australia	
27	Draw	22–2–3	Domenico Chiloiro	PTS	12	4 Jun 1965	Festival Hall, Melbourne, Australia	
26	Loss	22–2–2	Dion Murphy	PTS	10	1 Apr 1964	Christchurch, Canterbury, New Zealand	
25	Win	22–1–2	Domenico Chiloiro	PTS	15	19 Mar 1965	Festival Hall, Melbourne, Australia	Retained Australian featherweight title
24	Win	21–1–2	Billy Males	TKO	6 (12)	8 Feb 1965	Sydney Stadium, Sydney, Australia	
23	Win	20–1–2	Pat Gonzales	PTS	12	6 Nov 1964	Festival Hall, Melbourne, Australia	
22	Win	19–1–2	Ollie Taylor	PTS	15	18 Sep 1964	Festival Hall, Melbourne, Australia	Won vacant Australian featherweight title
21	Win	18–1–2	Max Murphy	PTS	12	28 Aug 1964	Festival Hall, Melbourne, Australia	
20	Win	17–1–2	Arthur Clarke	TKO	9 (12)	7 Aug 1964	Festival Hall, Melbourne, Australia	
19	Win	16–1–2	Les Dunn	TKO	10 (15)	22 May 1964	Festival Hall, Melbourne, Australia	Won Victoria State featherweight title
18	Win	15–1–2	Jake Gulino	PTS	12	20 Mar 1964	Festival Hall, Melbourne, Australia	
17	Win	14–1–2	Johnny Evans	TKO	7 (12)	21 Feb 1964	Festival Hall, Melbourne, Australia	
16	Win	13–1–2	Jake Gulino	PTS	12	29 Nov 1963	Festival Hall, Melbourne, Australia	
15	Win	12–1–2	Osei Renner	PTS	10	25 Oct 1963	Festival Hall, Melbourne, Australia	
14	Win	11–1–2	Jimmy Smith	PTS	10	4 Oct 1963	Festival Hall, Melbourne, Australia	
13	Win	10–1–2	Roy Spackman	PTS	8	6 Sep 1963	Festival Hall, Melbourne, Australia	
12	Win	9–1–2	Bobby Daldy	PTS	8	23 Aug 1963	Festival Hall, Melbourne, Australia	
11	Win	8–1–2	Kevin Bell	PTS	8	19 Jul 1963	Festival Hall, Melbourne, Australia	
10	Win	7–1–2	Bobby Daldy	PTS	6	19 Apr 1963	Festival Hall, Melbourne, Australia	
9	Win	6–1–2	Ken Eswards	KO	6 (6)	8 Mar 1963	Festival Hall, Melbourne, Australia	
8	Win	5–1–2	Roy Spackman	PTS	6	16 Nov 1962	Festival Hall, Melbourne, Australia	
7	Win	4–1–2	Nicky Wells	TKO	3 (4)	5 Oct 1962	Festival Hall, Melbourne, Australia	
6	Loss	3–1–2	Roy Spackman	PTS	6	22 Jun 1962	Festival Hall, Melbourne, Australia	
5	Win	3–0–2	Gordon Crooks	TKO	2 (6)	1 Jun 1962	Festival Hall, Melbourne, Australia	
4	Draw	2–0–2	Brian Levier	PTS	4	6 Apr 1962	Festival Hall, Melbourne, Australia	
3	Win	2–0–1	Peter Barnes	KO	4 (4)	15 Sep 1961	Festival Hall, Melbourne, Australia	
2	Win	1–0–1	Salvatore Casabene	TKO	2 (4)	4 Aug 1961	Festival Hall, Melbourne, Australia	
1	Draw	0–0–1	Sammy Lang	PTS	3	9 Jun 1961	Festival Hall, Melbourne, Australia	

== See also ==
- Lineal championship
- List of WBC world champions
- French Australian

Achievements
Preceded by Jose Legra	WBC Featherweight Champion; 21 January 1969 – 9 May 1970	Succeeded by Vicente Saldivar
