= Dion Murphy =

New Zealand boxer

Dion Murphy (born 30 October 1940) is a New Zealand former professional boxer who went on to manage hotels and perform as a musical entertainer with his wife Cecile. They created the ROCKONZ Hall of Fame in 2007 and an accompanying Annual Rock 'n' Roll Musical Festival celebrating the top musicians and performers of New Zealand in the 1950s, 1960s and 1970s. This festival also included Rock 'n' Roll dancing and parades and displays of classic cars from the same period. Dion and Cecile received the Key to the City of Christchurch in 2007 from the Mayor Garry Moore for their services to music in Christchurch. He and his wife produce the ROCKONZ programme and Concerts.

As a boxer, Dion won the New Zealand Boxing Association's Lightweight title by knocking out Jimmy Cassidy in eleven rounds on 10 October 1963. Murphy also has a victory over Johnny Famechon of Australia. He retired with an undefeated record of 17–0, 9 wins by knockout, and proceeded to pursue a musical producing career.

== Music producing career ==
Murphy developed eye problems that caused him to retire at age 26. He then became a musical producer, he and his wife organising RockOnz annual musical festivals in Christchurch. These festivals lasted until 2011.
