= Jimmy Anderson (boxer) =

British boxer (1942–2021)

Personal information
- Nationality: British
- Born: James Maurice Ernest Anderson; 1 October 1942 Waltham Cross, Hertfordshire, England
- Died: 21 December 2021 (aged 79) Essex, England
- Weight: Featherweight, super featherweight, lightweight

Boxing career

Boxing record
- Total fights: 37
- Wins: 27
- Win by KO: 24
- Losses: 9
- Draws: 1

James Maurice Ernest Anderson (1 October 1942 – 21 December 2021) was a British boxer who was the first holder of the British junior lightweight title, holding it from February 1968 to January 1969, and again from February 1969 until the division was abolished in 1970.

== Biography ==
Born in Waltham Cross, Hertfordshire, Anderson made his professional debut in October 1964 with a second round stoppage of Dave Savva. In October 1966 he stopped Johnny Mantle in the seventh round to win the vacant BBBofC Southern Area featherweight title.

In March 1967 he beat Japanese champion Hiroshi Shoji on points at the Royal Albert Hall. In 1968 the BBBofC recognized junior weight classes and Anderson was matched with the previously unbeaten Jimmy Revie for the British junior lightweight title, the two meeting at the Royal Albert Hall in February. Anderson stopped Revie in the ninth round to become the first British champion at the weight. In April 1968 he faced WBC World featherweight champion Howard Winstone at the Empire Pool, knocking Winstone down in the first round but losing on points over ten rounds.

Anderson made a successful defence of his British title in October against Brian Cartwright, and a second in February 1969 against Colin Lake at the Royal Albert Hall, Anderson stopping Lake in the seventh round to win the belt outright.

He lost to WBC World featherweight champion Johnny Famechon by one a quarter points in May 1969 but broke Famechon's jaw. Anderson fought a draw against American Bill Whittenburg in October. Anderson's reign as champion came to an end when the BBBofC ceased to recognize the junior lightweight division in 1970 (a British title was not contested at the weight again until 1986). He moved up to lightweight and fought twice in 1971 before retiring.

Anderson died in Essex, on 21 December 2021, aged 79. His funeral was held on 14 January 2022.
