= Billy Waith =

Welsh boxer

Personal information
- Nickname: Boy
- Nationality: (United Kingdom) British
- Born: 30 August 1950 Cardiff, Wales
- Died: 12 August 2022 (aged 71) Cardiff
- Weight: Welterweight

Boxing career
- Stance: Orthodox

Boxing record
- Total fights: 94
- Wins: 47
- Win by KO: 12
- Losses: 42
- Draws: 5
- No contests: 0

Billy Waith (30 August 1950 – 12 August 2022) was a Welsh welterweight boxer. He made an unsuccessful challenge for the British Welterweight title in 1978 against Henry Rhiney and became Wales Welterweight champion in 1982, holding it until his retirement from the sport in 1984.

== Career ==
Waith was born in Butetown in Cardiff, and was one of seven children. He was a successful amateur boxer and represented Wales in several tournaments, but after being passed over for the European Under-21 Championship he turned professional.

Waith's first professional bout, fighting at featherweight, was on 19 October 1970 when he faced Mickey Vann in Aberavon; Waith won the fight by points decision. His career as a featherweight progressed well, losing just one of his first 19 fights, the majority of them being fought at the National Sporting Club in London. During this period he also recorded the first draw of his career, when he fought Dennis Flynn at the Empire Pool as an undercard fight to the José Nápoles vs Ralph Charles WBA World Welterweight contest.

In June 1972, Waith travelled to South Africa for his first bout outside Britain. His opponent was South African lightweight champion Andries Steyn, in a ten-round fight in Johannesburg. The fight went the full ten rounds with Steyn taking the referee's decision. On his return to Britain, Waith entered a lightweight eliminator contest for a shot at the British title, facing Doncaster based fighter Howard Hayes at York Hall in London. Waith, who was floored during the contest, lost by a wide margin and decided to move out of the featherweight division.

Waith had struggled with maintaining his weight, a factor that affected his entire career, and by 1973 he was turning out as a lightweight, beating Paul Bromley by points at the Top Rank Suite in Swansea. Later that year Waith travelled to South Africa again, this time facing ex-South African featherweight champions, and future WBA bantamweight champion Arnold Taylor. Waith recorded the same result as his first trip to South Africa, a points decision loss. Waith followed the loss with three wins, before being beaten by Erik Kinnien in Oslo. Despite the loss in Norway, his three prior fights against British opponents gave Waith another chance at an eliminator for a British title, this time a 12-round contest against Scottish fighter Jim Watt. Waith fought three boxers who won world titles Arnold Taylor, Jim Watt, and Perico Fernandez defeating Fernandez by decision in Spain. Waith died on 12 August 2022.
