= Dennis Adams (boxer) =

South African boxer

Personal information
- Nationality: South African
- Born: Dennis Adams; 26 December 1934 Mayfair, Johannesburg, South Africa
- Died: 14 January 1971 (aged 36)
- Weight: fly/bantam/featherweight

Boxing career

Boxing record
- Total fights: 44
- Wins: 22 (KO 18)
- Losses: 21 (KO 12)
- No contests: 1

Dennis Adams (26 December 1934 – 14 January 1971) was a South African professional fly/bantam/featherweight boxer of the 1950s and '60s who won the Transvaal (South Africa) (White) bantamweight title, South African flyweight title, South African bantamweight title, and British Empire flyweight title, his professional fighting weight varied from 109 3/4 lb (49.8 kg; 7 st 11.8 lb), i.e. flyweight to 123 1/2 lb (56.0 kg; 8 st 11.5 lb), i.e. featherweight.
