= José Legrá =

Spanish boxer (1943–2026)

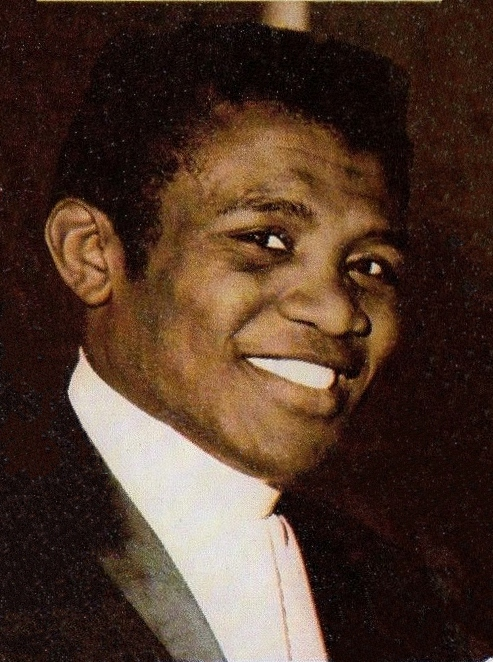
- Legrá c. 1973

Personal information
- Nickname: Pocket Cassius Clay
- Nationality: Spanish
- Born: 19 April 1943 Baracoa, Cuba
- Died: 14 July 2026 (aged 83) Madrid, Spain
- Height: 170 cm (5 ft 7 in)
- Weight: Featherweight

Boxing career
- Reach: 160 cm (63 in)
- Stance: Orthodox

Boxing record
- Total fights: 144
- Wins: 129
- Win by KO: 49
- Losses: 11
- Draws: 4
- No contests: 0

José Adolfo Legrá Utría (19 April 1943 – 14 July 2026) was a Cuban-born Spanish professional featherweight boxer. He was a two-time WBC World Featherweight Champion.

== Professional career ==
In June 1960, Legrá turned professional in Cuba winning his first fight against Pedro Pinera which he won with a points decision over four rounds. Legrá drew his next fight and lost two after that and fought a total of 34 fights in Mexico and Cuba before departing for Spain in 1963 with a record of 27–5–2.

=== Move to Spain ===
His first fight in Spain was in October 1963 against Moroccan Lazaro ben Layachi, which he won by KO in the sixth of eight rounds. Legrá then went on a run of over sixty wins between 1963 and 1967 with just one defeat on points against Welshman Howard Winstone at the Winter Gardens, Blackpool in England.

=== European title ===
Legrá won his first title belt, the vacant European Featherweight title, in December 1967 with a third-round knockout win over France's Yves Desmarets. Legrá subsequently relinquished the title without a defence.

=== WBC World title ===
Legrá first opportunity to fight for a recognised world title belt came in July 1968 when he challenged Howard Winstone again, this time for his WBC Featherweight title. Legrá floored Winstone twice in the first round of the fight. The bout was subsequently halted because Winstone had a badly swollen left eye.

He lost his WBC featherweight title on 21 January 1969 after being defeated by French-Australian Johnny Famechon on points at the Albert Hall in London.

== After Famechon ==
Legrá won two matches before losing by UD to Vicente Saldivar. Seven matches later Legrá would regain the EBU Featherweight title after beating Tommaso Galli on points. Legra would defend it five times before vacating it in 1972.

== Regaining the WBC title and retirement ==
On 16 December 1972. Legrá fought Clemente Sanchez for the vacant Featherweight title, Sanchez was stripped of the title before the fight but the title was still on the line for Legrá. Legrá TKO'd Sanchez in the tenth round to win.

Legrá lost the title in his very next fight to Brazilian Éder Jofre by Majority Decision. He would fight 3 matches after that, beating Jimmy Bell by points, losing to Alexis Arguello by KO, and beating Daniel Valdez by points.

== Personal life and death ==
In April 2020, Legra, aged 77, contracted COVID-19.

José Legra died on 14 July 2026, at the age of 83.

== Professional boxing record ==
144 fights	129 wins	11 losses
By knockout	49	3
By decision	80	8
Draws	4	

No.	Result	Record	Opponent	Type	Round	Date	Location	Notes
144	Loss	129–11–4	Alexis Argüello	TKO	1 (10)	24 November 1973	Estadio Roberto Clemente, Masaya, Nicaragua	
143	Win	129–10–4	Jimmy Bell	PTS	10	1 August 1973	Plaza de Toros del Coliseo Balear, Palma de Mallorca, Islas Baleares, Spain	
142	Loss	128–10–4	Éder Jofre	MD	15	5 May 1973	Ginasio Presidente Medici, Brasília, Distrito Federal, Brazil	Lost WBC featherweight title
141	Win	128–9–4	Clemente Sánchez	TKO	10 (15)	16 December 1972	Plaza de Toros Monumental, Monterrey, Nuevo León, Mexico	Won WBC featherweight title
140	Win	127–9–4	Daniel Vermandere	UD	15	6 October 1972	Palacio de los Deportes, Madrid, Comunidad de Madrid, Spain	Retained EBU featherweight title
139	Loss	126–9–4	Jonathan Dele	PTS	10	21 June 1972	Gran Price, Barcelona, Cataluña, Spain	
138	Win	126–8–4	Tommy Glencross	SD	15	17 May 1972	Princes Hall, Birmingham, West Midlands, England	Retained EBU featherweight title
137	Win	125–8–4	Evan Armstrong	UD	15	15 February 1972	Royal Albert Hall, Kensington, London, England	Retained EBU featherweight title
136	Win	124–8–4	Ben Salah Abdesselem	KO	1 (10)	15 January 1972	Plaza de Toros, Alicante, Comunidad Valenciana, Spain	
135	Win	123–8–4	Marius Cordier	TKO	3 (10)	26 August 1971	Alicante, Comunidad Valenciana, Spain	
134	Win	122–8–4	Giovanni Girgenti	KO	9 (15)	14 August 1971	Plaza de Toros, Alicante, Comunidad Valenciana, Spain	Retained EBU featherweight title
133	Loss	121–8–4	Tahar Ben Hassen	KO	4 (10)	21 May 1971	Palacio de los Deportes, Madrid, Comunidad de Madrid, Spain	
132	Win	121–7–4	David Pesenti	TKO	8 (10)	8 May 1971	Plaza de Toros de Vista Alegre, Bilbao, País Vasco, Spain	
131	Win	120–7–4	Marius Cordier	TKO	3 (10)	15 April 1971	Gran Price, Barcelona, Cataluña, Spain	
130	Win	119–7–4	Jimmy Revie	UD	15	25 January 1971	Anglo-American Sporting Club, Piccadilly, London, England	Retained EBU featherweight title
129	Win	118–7–4	Renato Galli	PTS	10	26 December 1970	Alicante, Comunidad Valenciana, Spain	
128	Win	117–7–4	Abel Cesar Almaraz	KO	4 (8)	12 December 1970	Santa Cruz de Tenerife, Islas Canarias, Spain	
127	Win	116–7–4	Bruno Melissano	PTS	10	14 November 1970	Madrid, Spain	
126	Win	115–7–4	Ugo Poli	PTS	10	24 October 1970	Pabellón Polideportivo del Real Madrid, Madrid, Spain	
125	Win	114–7–4	Tommaso Galli	PTS	15	26 June 1970	Palacio de los Deportes, Madrid, Comunidad de Madrid, Spain	Won EBU featherweight title
124	Win	113–7–4	Domenico Chiloiro	TKO	7 (10)	22 May 1970	Palacio de los Deportes, Madrid, Comunidad de Madrid, Spain	
123	Win	112–7–4	Rolf Kersten	TKO	1 (10)	11 April 1970	Plaza de Toros, Santa Cruz de Tenerife, Islas Canarias, Spain	
122	Win	111–7–4	Jimmy Bell	PTS	10	5 March 1970	Gran Price, Barcelona, Cataluña, Spain	
121	Win	110–7–4	Evan Armstrong	PTS	10	5 February 1970	Palacio de los Deportes, Barcelona, Cataluña, Spain	
120	Win	109–7–4	Miguel Herrera	TKO	2 (10)	11 December 1969	Palacio de los Deportes, Barcelona, Cataluña, Spain	
119	Win	108–7–4	Rey Miller	KO	2 (10)	24 October 1969	Palacio de los Deportes, Madrid, Comunidad de Madrid, Spain	
118	Loss	107–7–4	Vicente Saldivar	UD	10	18 July 1969	Forum, Inglewood, California, U.S.	
117	Win	107–6–4	Domenico Scalco	TKO	1 (8)	13 June 1969	Palacio de los Deportes, Madrid, Comunidad de Madrid, Spain	
116	Win	106–6–4	Vicente Pina	KO	4 (10)	30 May 1969	Palacio de los Deportes, Madrid, Comunidad de Madrid, Spain	
115	Loss	105–6–4	Johnny Famechon	PTS	15	21 January 1969	Royal Albert Hall, Kensington, London, England	Lost WBC featherweight title
114	Win	105–5–4	Felix Said Brami	KO	1 (10)	28 October 1968	Palais des Sports, Paris, France	
113	Win	104–5–4	Bob Allotey	PTS	10	5 October 1968	Pabellón de La Casilla, Bilbao, País Vasco, Spain	
112	Win	103–5–4	Howard Winstone	TKO	5 (15)	24 July 1968	Coney Beach Arena, Porthcawl, Wales	Won WBC featherweight title
111	Win	102–5–4	Fernando Tavares	KO	2 (10)	10 June 1968	Plaza de Toros La Manzanera, Logrono, La Rioja, Spain	
110	Win	101–5–4	Klaus Jacoby	KO	6 (10)	10 May 1968	Palacio de los Deportes, Madrid, Comunidad de Madrid, Spain	
109	Win	100–5–4	Joe Tetteh	PTS	10	25 April 1968	Gran Price, Barcelona, Cataluña, Spain	
108	Win	99–5–4	Ernesto Miranda	TKO	4 (10)	14 March 1968	Gran Price, Barcelona, Cataluña, Spain	
107	Win	98–5–4	Ernesto Miranda	PTS	10	2 February 1968	Pabellón de La Casilla, Bilbao, País Vasco, Spain	
106	Win	97–5–4	Yves Desmarets	TKO	3 (15)	22 December 1967	Palacio de los Deportes, Madrid, Comunidad de Madrid, Spain	Won vacant EBU featherweight title
105	Win	96–5–4	Benito Gallardo	TKO	3 (10)	9 November 1967	Gran Price, Barcelona, Cataluña, Spain	
104	Win	95–5–4	Paul Rourre	PTS	10	30 September 1967	Plaza de Toros, Santa Cruz de Tenerife, Islas Canarias, Spain	
103	Win	94–5–4	Fernando Tavares	TKO	7 (10)	2 September 1967	Plaza de Toros, Santa Cruz de Tenerife, Islas Canarias, Spain	
102	Win	93–5–4	Don Johnson	PTS	10	30 June 1967	Plaza de Toros de Las Ventas, Madrid, Comunidad de Madrid, Spain	
101	Win	92–5–4	Jose Luis Torcida	PTS	10	24 June 1967	Leon, Castilla y León, Spain	
100	Win	91–5–4	Paul Rourre	PTS	10	10 June 1967	Velódromo de Anoeta, San Sebastián, País Vasco, Spain	
99	Win	90–5–4	Maurice Tavant	PTS	10	2 June 1967	Palacio de los Deportes, Barcelona, Cataluña, Spain	
98	Win	89–5–4	Mohamed Ben Saouita	TKO	1 (10)	27 April 1967	Palacio de los Deportes, Barcelona, Cataluña, Spain	
97	Win	88–5–4	Ameur Lamine	PTS	10	18 March 1967	Valencia, Comunidad Valenciana, Spain	
96	Win	87–5–4	Rafiu King	PTS	10	10 March 1967	Palacio de los Deportes, Madrid, Comunidad de Madrid, Spain	
95	Win	86–5–4	Salvatore Gennatiempo	TKO	6 (10)	12 February 1967	Malaga, Andalucía, Spain	
94	Win	85–5–4	Julian Gonzalez	PTS	10	21 January 1967	Santa Cruz de Tenerife, Islas Canarias, Spain	
93	Win	84–5–4	Roger Younsi	PTS	10	14 January 1967	Plaza de Toros, Santa Cruz de Tenerife, Islas Canarias, Spain	
92	Win	83–5–4	Mohamed Halimi Laroussi	TKO	3 (10)	8 January 1967	Estadio Insular, Las Palmas, Islas Canarias, Spain	
91	Win	82–5–4	Love Allotey	PTS	12	23 December 1966	Palacio de los Deportes, Madrid, Comunidad de Madrid, Spain	
90	Win	81–5–4	Jean De Keers	KO	1 (10)	2 December 1966	Palacio de los Deportes, Madrid, Comunidad de Madrid, Spain	
89	Win	80–5–4	Hector Omar Oliva	TKO	9 (10)	24 November 1966	Palacio de los Deportes, Barcelona, Cataluña, Spain	
88	Win	79–5–4	Manuel Carvajal	PTS	10	12 November 1966	Pabellón Municipal de Deportes, Gijon, Principado de Asturias, Spain	
87	Win	78–5–4	Roberto Marthon	TKO	2 (10)	27 October 1966	Pabellón de la Feria de Muestras, Bilbao, País Vasco, Spain	
86	Win	77–5–4	Luis Segura	TKO	2 (8)	15 October 1966	Gimnasio Polideportivo, Zaragoza, Aragón, Spain	
85	Win	76–5–4	Raul Tejera	TKO	2 (10)	1 October 1966	Pabellón Municipal de Deportes, Gijon, Principado de Asturias, Spain	
84	Win	75–5–4	Julian Gonzalez	TKO	7 (8)	2 September 1966	Campo del Gas, Madrid, Comunidad de Madrid, Spain	
83	Win	74–5–4	Tommy Thompson	TKO	1 (10)	20 August 1966	Velódromo de Anoeta, San Sebastian, País Vasco, Spain	
82	Win	73–5–4	Vincenzo Pitardi	TKO	5 (10)	12 August 1966	Campo del Gas, Madrid, Comunidad de Madrid, Spain	
81	Win	72–5–4	Celmiro Rios	TKO	3 (8)	29 July 1966	Plaza de Toros de Las Arenas, Barcelona, Cataluña, Spain	
80	Win	71–5–4	Jose Riveiro	KO	7 (10)	2 July 1966	Plaza de Toros de Buenavista, Oviedo, Principado de Asturias, Spain	
79	Win	70–5–4	Jose Luis Torcida	PTS	10	4 June 1966	Santander, Cantabria, Spain	
78	Win	69–5–4	Angel Chinea	PTS	8	21 May 1966	Pabellón Velódromo, Mataro, Cataluña, Spain	
77	Win	68–5–4	Dris ben Amar	TKO	5 (10)	7 May 1966	Frontón de Anoeta, San Sebastian, País Vasco, Spain	
76	Win	67–5–4	Cristobal Gomez	PTS	8	30 April 1966	Plaza de Toros de La Malagueta, Malaga, Andalucía, Spain	
75	Win	66–5–4	Hector Omar Oliva	PTS	8	15 April 1966	Palacio de los Deportes, Madrid, Comunidad de Madrid, Spain	
74	Win	65–5–4	Jesus Zarco	PTS	10	3 April 1966	Santander, Cantabria, Spain	
73	Win	64–5–4	Oye Turpin	TKO	2 (8)	17 March 1966	Gran Price, Barcelona, Cataluña, Spain	
72	Win	63–5–4	Antonio Paiva	TKO	7 (8)	3 March 1966	Gran Price, Barcelona, Cataluña, Spain	
71	Win	62–5–4	Cristobal Gomez	PTS	8	13 February 1966	Almeria, Andalucía, Spain	
70	Win	61–5–4	Juan Rodriguez	PTS	8	6 January 1966	Terraza Albéniz, Almeria, Andalucía, Spain	
69	Win	60–5–4	Manuel Calvo	PTS	8	18 December 1965	Salamanca, Castilla y León, Spain	
68	Win	59–5–4	Manuel Calvo	PTS	8	26 November 1965	Palacio de los Deportes, Madrid, Comunidad de Madrid, Spain	
67	Win	58–5–4	Ramon Casal	PTS	8	12 November 1965	Palacio de los Deportes, Madrid, Comunidad de Madrid, Spain	
66	Win	57–5–4	Jose Bisbal	PTS	8	30 October 1965	Frontón de Anoeta, San Sebastian, País Vasco, Spain	
65	Win	56–5–4	Luis Segura	PTS	8	25 September 1965	Valladolid, Castilla y León, Spain	
64	Win	55–5–4	Juan de Leon	KO	4 (8)	19 September 1965	Frontón de Anoeta, San Sebastian, País Vasco, Spain	
63	Win	54–5–4	Tristano Tartarini	TKO	1 (8)	5 September 1965	Campo de Futbol de Pedras Brancas, Carballo, Galicia, Spain	Stopped on cuts
62	Win	53–5–4	Lope de Pablo	PTS	8	31 August 1965	Estudios de Prado del Rey, Madrid, Comunidad de Madrid, Spain	
61	Loss	52–5–4	Howard Winstone	PTS	10	22 June 1965	Winter Gardens, Blackpool, Lancashire, England	
60	Win	52–4–4	Jose Caetano dos Santos	PTS	8	2 June 1965	Palacio de los Deportes, Madrid, Comunidad de Madrid, Spain	
59	Win	51–4–4	Antonio Paiva	PTS	8	2 April 1965	Palacio de los Deportes, Madrid, Comunidad de Madrid, Spain	
58	Win	50–4–4	Miguel Calderin	PTS	8	13 March 1965	Plaza de Toros, Santa Cruz de Tenerife, Islas Canarias, Spain	
57	Win	49–4–4	Domingo Cabrera	TKO	8 (8)	6 March 1965	Plaza de Toros, Santa Cruz de Tenerife, Islas Canarias, Spain	
56	Win	48–4–4	Mario Sitri	PTS	8	26 February 1965	Palacio de los Deportes, Madrid, Comunidad de Madrid, Spain	
55	Draw	47–4–4	Angel Neches	PTS	8	30 January 1965	Frontón del Club Deportivo, Bilbao, País Vasco, Spain	
54	Win	47–4–3	Juan Pinto	PTS	8	22 January 1965	Palacio de los Deportes, Madrid, Comunidad de Madrid, Spain	
53	Win	46–4–3	Renato Galli	PTS	8	26 November 1964	Gran Price, Barcelona, Cataluña, Spain	
52	Win	45–4–3	Jose Sanchez Merayo	TKO	2 (8)	14 November 1964	Palacio de los Deportes, Madrid, Comunidad de Madrid, Spain	
51	Win	44–4–3	Luis Aisa	PTS	8	31 October 1964	Palacio de los Deportes, Madrid, Comunidad de Madrid, Spain	
50	Win	43–4–3	Antoine Licausi	PTS	8	10 October 1964	Palacio de los Deportes, Madrid, Comunidad de Madrid, Spain	
49	Win	42–4–3	Vincenzo Pitardi	PTS	8	18 September 1964	Palacio de los Deportes, Madrid, Comunidad de Madrid, Spain	
48	Win	41–4–3	Luis Aisa	PTS	10	5 September 1964	Palacio de los Deportes, Madrid, Comunidad de Madrid, Spain	
47	Win	40–4–3	Miguel Calderin	PTS	10	8 August 1964	Plaza de Toros, Valencia, Comunidad Valenciana, Spain	
46	Win	39–4–3	Rafael Gayo	PTS	8	18 July 1964	Campo de Futbol de Pedras Brancas, Carballo, Galicia, Spain	
45	Win	38–4–3	Angel Rodriguez	KO	1 (8)	2 July 1964	Plaza de Toros, Valencia, Comunidad Valenciana, Spain	
44	Win	37–4–3	Kid Tano	PTS	8	4 June 1964	Estadio Insular, Las Palmas, Islas Canarias, Spain	
43	Win	36–4–3	Kid Tano	PTS	10	23 May 1964	Estadio Insular, Las Palmas, Islas Canarias, Spain	
42	Win	35–4–3	Miguel Calderin	PTS	8	7 May 1964	Palacio de los Deportes, Madrid, Comunidad de Madrid, Spain	
41	Draw	34–4–3	Kid Tano	PTS	8	31 March 1964	Plaza de Toros, Santa Cruz de Tenerife, Islas Canarias, Spain	
40	Win	34–4–2	Jose Luis Martinez	PTS	8	14 March 1964	Frontón del Club Deportivo, Bilbao, País Vasco, Spain	
39	Win	33–4–2	Toni Alonso	PTS	8	15 February 1964	Frontón Fiesta Alegre, Madrid, Comunidad de Madrid, Spain	
38	Win	32–4–2	José Luis Biescas	PTS	8	5 February 1964	Gran Price, Barcelona, Cataluña, Spain	
37	Win	31–4–2	Jose Luis Martinez	PTS	8	11 January 1964	Frontón Fiesta Alegre, Madrid, Comunidad de Madrid, Spain	
36	Win	30–4–2	Luis Aisa	PTS	8	4 December 1963	Gran Price, Barcelona, Cataluña, Spain	
35	Win	29–4–2	Baldomero Arroyo	PTS	8	2 November 1963	Frontón Fiesta Alegre, Madrid, Comunidad de Madrid, Spain	
34	Win	28–4–2	Lazaro ben Layachi	TKO	6 (8)	26 October 1963	Madrid, Comunidad de Madrid, Spain	
33	Loss	27–4–2	Vicente Nunez	PTS	8	1 October 1963	Mexico	Exact month & date unknown
32	Win	27–3–2	Vicente Nunez	PTS	8	1 July 1963	Mexico	Exact month & date unknown
31	Draw	26–3–2	Juan Fernandez	PTS	8	1 June 1963	Mexico	Exact month & date unknown
30	Win	26–3–1	Enrique Yamuri	PTS	8	1 May 1963	Mexico	Exact month & date unknown
29	Win	25–3–1	Juan Fernandez	PTS	10	1 April 1963	Mexico	Exact month & date unknown
28	Win	24–3–1	Jimmy Escudero	PTS	10	1 March 1963	Mexico	Exact month & date unknown
27	Win	23–3–1	Pedro Soto	PTS	10	1 October 1962	Mexico	Exact month & date unknown
26	Win	22–3–1	Vicente Nunez	PTS	10	1 August 1962	Mexico	Exact month & date unknown
25	Win	21–3–1	Raimundo Pellegrino	PTS	8	1 July 1962	Mexico	Exact month & date unknown
24	Win	20–3–1	Esteban Castillo	PTS	10	1 June 1962	Mexico	Exact month & date unknown
23	Win	19–3–1	Oribazo	PTS	8	1 May 1962	Mexico	Exact month & date unknown
22	Win	18–3–1	Leopoldo Galvez	PTS	8	1 April 1962	Mexico	Exact month & date unknown
21	Win	17–3–1	Raul Nunez	PTS	8	1 March 1962	Mexico	Exact month & date unknown
20	Win	16–3–1	Luis Odio	PTS	8	1 February 1962	Mexico	Exact month & date unknown
19	Win	15–3–1	Indio del Sur	PTS	8	1 January 1962	Mexico	Exact month & date unknown
18	Loss	14–3–1	Baby Luis	PTS	10	6 October 1961	Palacio de Deportes, Havana, Cuba	
17	Win	14–2–1	Tomas Martinez	PTS	6	1 October 1961	Mexico	Exact month & date unknown
16	Win	13–2–1	Tomas Perez	PTS	6	1 September 1961	Mexico	Exact month & date unknown
15	Win	12–2–1	Huracan Diaz	KO	3 (6)	1 July 1961	Mexico	Exact month & date unknown
14	Win	11–2–1	Eugenio Gimenez	KO	3 (6)	1 June 1961	Mexico	Exact month & date unknown
13	Win	10–2–1	Jimmy Hightower	RTD	4 (6)	22 May 1961	Sir John Club, Miami, Florida, U.S.	
12	Loss	9–2–1	Angel Ley	KO	6 (8)	15 April 1961	Arena Mexico, Mexico City, Distrito Federal, Mexico	
11	Win	9–1–1	Indio Iguamo	KO	2 (8)	1 March 1961	Cuba	Exact month & date unknown
10	Win	8–1–1	Pedro Pinera	PTS	8	12 January 1961	Cuba	Exact month & date unknown
9	Loss	7–1–1	Agustin Carmona	PTS	8	7 January 1961	Havana, Cuba	
8	Win	7–0–1	Miguel Oliva	PTS	6	17 December 1960	Palacio de Deportes, Havana, Cuba	
7	Win	6–0–1	Victor Recio	TKO	3 (?)	26 November 1960	Havana, Cuba	
6	Win	5–0–1	Miguel Oliva	PTS	4	22 October 1960	Havana, Cuba	
5	Win	4–0–1	Andres Perez	TKO	2 (6)	24 September 1960	Havana, Cuba	
4	Win	3–0–1	Julian Perez	PTS	6	1 September 1960	Cuba	Exact month & date unknown
3	Draw	2–0–1	Jose Ramon Ferrer	PTS	4	20 August 1960	Havana, Cuba	
2	Win	2–0	Julian Perez	PTS	6 (?)	1 August 1960	Havana, Cuba	Exact month & date unknown
1	Win	1–0	Pedro Pinera	PTS	4	16 July 1960	Havana, Cuba	

== See also ==
- Lineal championship
- List of WBC world champions

Achievements
Preceded by Howard Winstone	WBC Featherweight Champion; 24 July 1968 – 21 January 1969	Succeeded by Johnny Famechon
Preceded by Clemente Sanchez; Stripped (failed to make weight)	WBC Featherweight Champion; 16 December 1972 – 5 May 1973	Succeeded by Eder Jofre
Preceded by Clemente Sanchez	Lineal Featherweight Champion; 16 December 1972 – 5 May 1973	Succeeded by Eder Jofre
