= John O'Brien (boxer) =

Scottish boxer, born 1937

Personal information
- Nationality: Scottish
- Born: 20 February 1937 Glasgow, Scotland
- Died: 30 March 1979 (aged 42)
- Weight: feather/super feather/light/light welterweight

Boxing career
- Stance: Southpaw

Boxing record
- Total fights: 47
- Wins: 30 (KO 15)
- Losses: 17 (KO 8)

John O'Brien (20 February 1937 – 30 March 1979 (aged 42)) born in Glasgow was a Scottish professional feather/super feather/light/light welterweight boxer of the 1960s and '70s, who won the British Commonwealth featherweight title, and was a challenger for the BBBofC British featherweight title against; Howard Winstone, and Jimmy Revie and European Boxing Union (EBU) featherweight title against Howard Winstone. His professional fighting weight varied from 124 lb (56 kg; 8 st 12 lb), i.e. featherweight to 136 lb (61.7 kg; 9 st 10.0 lb), i.e. light welterweight.
