= Alan Rudkin =

British boxer

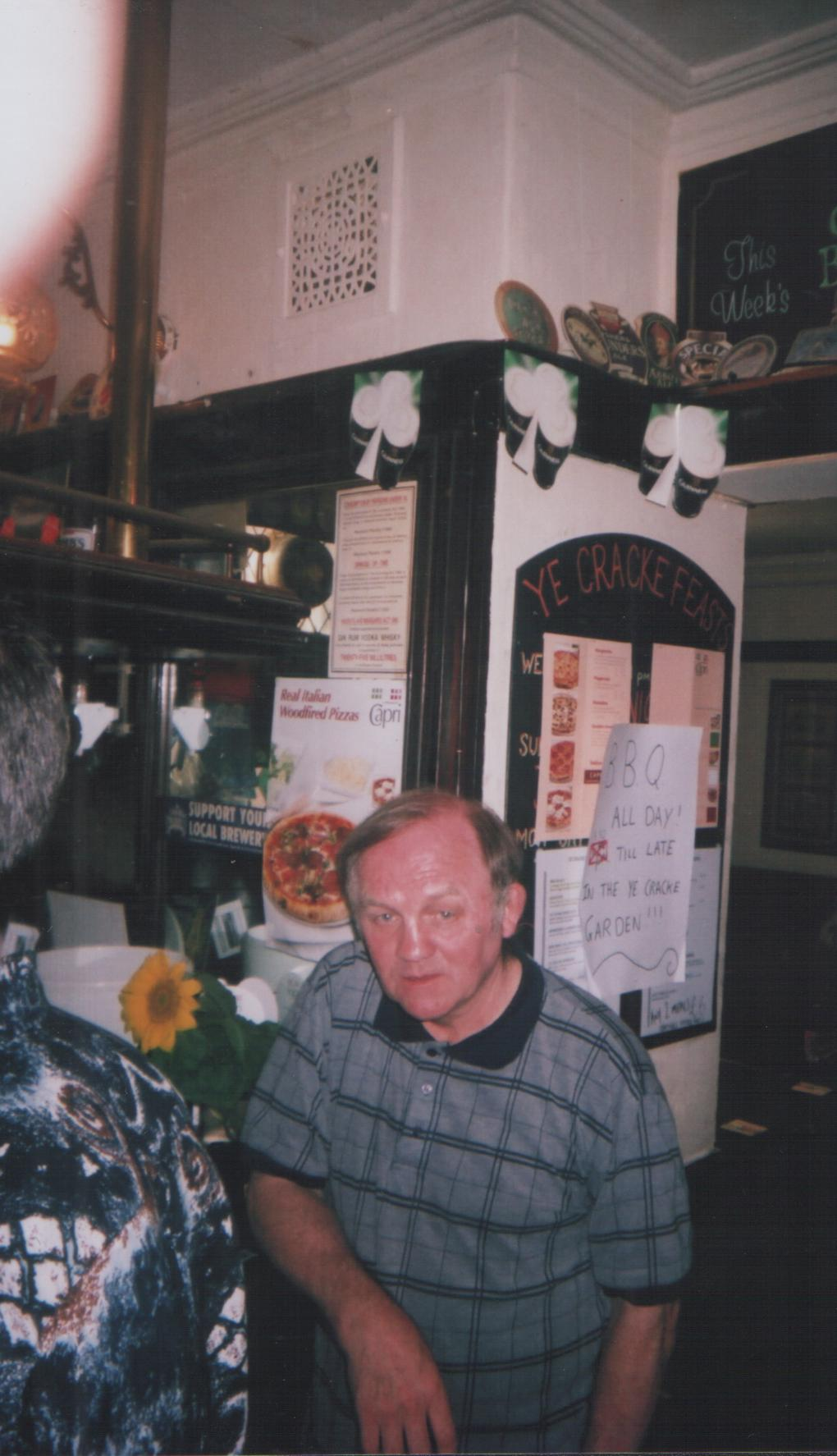

Personal information
- Nationality: British
- Born: 18 November 1941 St Asaph, Wales
- Died: 22 September 2010 (aged 68) Liverpool, England
- Weight: Bantamweight

Boxing career

Boxing record
- Total fights: 50
- Wins: 42
- Losses: 8

Alan Rudkin MBE (18 November 1941 – 22 September 2010) was a British national, Commonwealth, and European bantamweight boxing champion (1965–1970). He was born in St Asaph (Wales), as his pregnant mother was evacuated from Liverpool during the second world war. He was brought up in Dingle, Liverpool, and was a member of the Florence Institute.

Rudkin won domestic British, Commonwealth & European titles at Bantamweight where he held a Lonsdale belt & also won a British title at Featherweight. He was noted for his 2 close fights with the great Walter McGowan, each winning one.

He was a three times challenger for the undisputed World Championship, in Japan, Australia & Mexico. Rudkin appeared to be ahead on points but lost contentious decisions against both Masahiko “Fighting” Harada & Lionel Rose. He was decisively beaten by Rubén Olivares. He was appointed MBE in 1973. In 2007 the Liverpool Echo included him in its list of the 800 greatest Liverpudlians, as part of Liverpool's 800th anniversary.

He was the subject of This Is Your Life in 1972 when he was surprised by Eamonn Andrews.

Rudkin was found collapsed on Mount Street, Liverpool in the early hours of 21 September 2010. He died early on 22 September 2010, at the age of 68. The cause of death was unclear.

== See also ==
- List of British bantamweight boxing champions
