= Evan Armstrong =

Scottish boxer (1943–2017)

Personal information
- Nationality: Scottish
- Born: 15 February 1943 Ayr, Scotland
- Died: 8 July 2017 (aged 74)
- Weight: bantam/feather/super featherweight

Boxing career

Boxing record
- Total fights: 54
- Wins: 39 (KO 30)
- Losses: 14 (KO 6)
- Draws: 1

Evan Armstrong (15 February 1943 – 8 July 2017) was a Scottish professional bantam/feather/super featherweight boxer of the 1960s and 1970s, who won the British Boxing Board of Control (BBBofC) Scottish Area bantamweight title, BBBofC Scottish Area featherweight title, BBBofC British featherweight title, and Commonwealth featherweight title, and was a challenger for the BBBofC British bantamweight title against Alan Rudkin, and European Boxing Union (EBU) featherweight title against José Legrá, his professional fighting weight varied from 116 3/4 lb (53.0 kg; 8 st 4.8 lb), i.e. bantamweight to 127 1/2 lb (57.8 kg; 9 st 1.5 lb), i.e. super featherweight. Armstrong had Alzheimer's disease later in life and died at the age of 74 in late 2017.
