= José Medel =

Mexican boxer

Personal information
- Nickname: El Huitlacoche
- Nationality: (Mexico) Mexican
- Born: José Medel; March 19, 1938 Mexico City, Mexico
- Died: January 31, 2001 (aged 62)
- Height: 5 ft 4 1/2 in (164 cm)
- Weight: Lightweight; Featherweight; Bantamweight; Flyweight

Boxing career
- Reach: 67 1/2 in (171 cm)
- Stance: Orthodox

Boxing record
- Total fights: 108
- Wins: 69
- Win by KO: 44
- Losses: 31
- Draws: 8

José Medel (June 21, 1938 - January 31, 2001), sometimes introduced as Joe Medel, was a Mexican boxer in the Featherweight division. He was one of the most popular boxers from Mexico.

== Professional career ==
Medel was born in Mexico City, Mexico. In August 1959, he beat José Toluco López to win the Mexican Bantamweight Championship.

=== WBA World bantamweight title ===
His first world title shot was in Brazil against the WBA champion Eder Jofre, Medel would go on to lose the bout.

=== WBC & WBA World bantamweight titles ===
In his next title fight, Medel lost a fifteen round decision to Fighting Harada in Japan the country of the champion.

== Professional boxing record ==
69 Wins (44 knockouts, 25 decisions), 31 Losses (10 knockouts, 20 decisions, 1 disqualification), 8 Draws
Res.	Record	Opponent	Type	Round	Date	Location	Notes
Loss	69–31–8	(Japan) Royal Kobayashi	RTD	6 (10)	1974-06-09	Korakuen Hall, Tokyo, Japan	
Loss	69–30–8	(Panama) Adalides Munoz	KO	4 (10)	1973-09-29	Acapulco, Mexico	
Win	69–29–8	(Mexico) Miguel Hernandez	TKO	6 (10)	1972-04-18	Auditorio Matamoros, Matamoros, Mexico	
Loss	68–29–8	(Mexico) Salvador Martinez Carillo	PTS	10	1972-01-21	Arena Coliseo, Guadalajara, Mexico	
Loss	68–28–8	(Mexico) Jose Luis Meza	PTS	10	1971-03-27	Arena México, Mexico City, Mexico	
Loss	68–27–8	(Mexico) Efren Torres	KO	4 (10)	1970-10-31	Arena Coliseo, Guadalajara, Mexico	
Win	68–26–8	(Dominican Republic) Benito Estrella	TKO	3 (10)	1970-09-05	Arena México, Mexico City, Mexico	
Win	67–26–8	(Argentina) Ubaldo Duarte	PTS	10	1970-04-11	Arena México, Mexico City, Mexico	
Win	66–26–8	(Japan) Misao Yamane	TKO	3 (10)	1969-11-28	Plaza Nuevo Progreso, Guadalajara, Mexico	
Draw	65–26–8	(Mexico) Chucho Castillo	PTS	12	1969-09-30	Ciudad Juárez, Mexico	For Mexican bantamweight title
Loss	65–26–7	(Japan) Kazuyoshi Kanazawa	PTS	10	1969-08-07	Tokyo, Japan	
Win	65–25–7	(Japan) Shigeyoshi Oki	UD	10	1969-06-10	Plaza de Toros, Ciudad Juárez, Mexico	
Loss	64–25–7	(Mexico) Rubén Olivares	KO	8 (10)	1968-11-24	Estadio Universitario, Monterrey, Mexico	
Loss	64–24–7	(Australia) Lionel Rose	PTS	10	1968-08-28	(United States) The Forum, Inglewood, California, U.S.	
Win	64–23–7	(United Kingdom) Evan Armstrong	PTS	10	1968-03-31	El Toreo de Cuatro Caminos, Mexico City, Mexico	
Draw	63–23–7	(Japan) Masataka Uno	PTS	10	1968-02-07	Nagoya, Japan	
Loss	63–23–6	(Mexico) Efren Torres	PTS	10	1967-10-07	Arena Coliseo, Guadalajara, Mexico	
Loss	63–22–6	(Mexico) Chucho Castillo	UD	12	1967-04-29	Arena México, Mexico City, Mexico	Lost Mexican bantamweight title
Loss	63–21–6	(Japan) Fighting Harada	UD	15	1967-01-03	Aichi Prefectural Gymnasium, Nagoya, Japan	For WBA, WBC, The Ring, and lineal bantamweight titles
Win	63–20–6	(Japan) Hiroshi Otomori	TKO	7 (10)	1966-10-22	El Toreo de Cuatro Caminos, Mexico City, Mexico	
Win	62–20–6	(Mexico) Rudy Corona	TKO	6 (10)	1966-06-21	(United States) Sports Arena, Los Angeles, California, U.S.	
Win	61–20–6	(Mexico) Jesús Pimentel	UD	10	1965-12-06	(United States) Sports Arena, Los Angeles, California, U.S.	
Win	60–20–6	(United Kingdom) Walter McGowan	TKO	6 (10)	1965-06-01	(United Kingdom) Empire Pool, London, England	
Win	59–20–6	(Japan) Katsuo Saito	UD	10	1965-05-13	Nihon University Auditorium, Tokyo, Japan	
Win	58–20–6	(Mexico) Vicente Garcia	KO	9 (12)	1965-04-03	Arena México, Mexico City, Mexico	Retained Mexican bantamweight title
Win	57–20–6	(Philippines) Ray Asis	KO	3 (10)	1964-09-26	El Toreo de Cuatro Caminos, Mexico City, Mexico	
Win	56–20–6	(Mexico) Manuel Galvez	PTS	10	1964-07-10	Tampico, Mexico	
Loss	55–20–6	(Philippines) Ray Asis	SD	10	1964-04-18	Araneta Coliseum, Quezon City, Philippines	
Win	55–19–6	(Mexico) Manuel Barrios	PTS	12	1963-11-30	El Toreo de Cuatro Caminos, Mexico City, Mexico	Retained Mexican bantamweight title
Draw	54–19–6	(Japan) Tetsuro Kawai	PTS	10	1963-10-17	Kumamoto, Japan	
Win	54–19–5	(Japan) Fighting Harada	TKO	6 (10)	1963-09-26	Tokyo, Japan	
Draw	53–19–5	(Mexico) Manuel Barrios	PTS	12	1963-08-17	Ciudad Juárez, Mexico	Retained Mexican bantamweight title
Loss	53–19–4	(Mexico) Manuel Barrios	PTS	10	1963-04-21	Ciudad Juárez, Mexico	
Win	53–18–4	(Mexico) Edmundo Esparza	TKO	3 (12)	1963-02-02	Mexico City, Mexico	Retained Mexican bantamweight title
Loss	52–18–4	(Brazil) Éder Jofre	KO	6 (15)	1962-09-11	Ginásio do Ibirapuera, São Paulo, Brazil	For WBA, The Ring, and lineal bantamweight titles
Win	52–17–4	(Japan) Sadao Yaoita	PTS	10	1962-03-29	Tokyo, Japan	
Win	51–17–4	(Mexico) Ignacio Pina	TKO	11 (12)	1961-11-04	Arena México, Mexico City, Mexico	Retained Mexican bantamweight title
Win	50–17–4	(Japan) Haruo Sakamoto	PTS	10	1961-10-17	Tokyo, Japan	
Win	49–17–4	(Japan) Mitsunori Seki	PTS	5 (10)	1961-08-31	Tokyo, Japan	
Win	48–17–4	(Cuba) Felix Gutierrez	PTS	7 (10)	1961-07-29	Mexico City, Mexico	
Win	47–17–4	(United States) Hector Agundez	PTS	4 (10)	1961-06-18	Mexicali, Mexico	
Win	46–17–4	(United States) Herman Leyva Marques	SD	12	1961-03-21	(United States) Freeman Coliseum, San Antonio, Texas, U.S.	Won North American bantamweight title
Draw	45–17–4	(Cuba) Hiram Bacallao	PTS	10	1961-02-25	Arena México, Mexico City, Mexico	
Win	45–17–3	(Mexico) José Toluco López	TKO	7 (10)	1960-11-19	Mexico City, Mexico	Originally a Mexican bantamweight title bout, but López missed weight.
Win	44–17–3	(United States) Manny Elias	PTS	10	1960-10-15	Nuevo Laredo, Mexico	
Loss	43–17–3	(Brazil) Éder Jofre	KO	10 (12)	1960-08-18	(United States) Olympic Auditorium, Los Angeles, California, U.S.	
Win	43–16–3	(Mexico) Eloy Sanchez	PTS	12	1960-07-23	Mexico City, Mexico	Retained Mexican bantamweight title
Win	42–16–3	(Mexico) Monito Luna	KO	8 (10)	1960-06-09	Puebla, Mexico	
Win	41–16–3	(Philippines) Danny Kid	UD	10	1960-04-09	Mexico City, Mexico	
Win	40–16–3	(Panama) Toto Ibarra	KO	3 (10)	1960-02-20	Mexico City, Mexico	
Loss	39–16–3	(Mexico) Eloy Sanchez	PTS	10	1959-12-19	Arena Coliseo, Guadalajara, Mexico	
Loss	39–15–3	(Mexico) Ignacio Pina	PTS	10	1959-11-16	Tijuana, Mexico	
Loss	39–14–3	(Philippines) Danny Kid	SD	12	1959-09-24	(United States) Olympic Auditorium, Los Angeles, California, U.S.	For North American bantamweight title
Win	39–13–3	(Mexico) Pimi Barajas	KO	7 (10)	1959-09-12	Monterrey, Mexico	
Win	38–13–3	(Mexico) José Toluco López	PTS	12	1959-08-01	Mexico City, Mexico	Won Mexican bantamweight title
Win	37–13–3	(Mexico) Javier Garfias	TKO	8 (10)	1959-07-04	Arena Coliseo, Guadalajara, Mexico	
Win	36–13–3	(Mexico) Antonio Rosales	TKO	8 (10)	1959-06-20	Arena Coliseo, Guadalajara, Mexico	
Win	35–13–3	(United States) Hector Agundez	KO	5 (10)	1959-05-01	Mexicali, Mexico	
Win	34–13–3	(Mexico) Johnny Sarduy	KO	3 (10)	1959-04-25	Mexico City, Mexico	
Win	33–13–3	(Mexico) Mario de Leon	UD	12	1959-01-29	(United States) Olympic Auditorium, Los Angeles, California, U.S.	
Loss	32–13–3	(United States) Boots Monroe	UD	10	1959-01-08	(United States) Olympic Auditorium, Los Angeles, California, U.S.	
Win	32–12–3	(Philippines) Ross Padilla	TKO	7 (10)	1958-10-30	(United States) Olympic Auditorium, Los Angeles, California, U.S.	
Win	31–12–3	(Mexico) Eduardo Guerrero	KO	6 (10)	1958-10-11	Mexico City, Mexico	
Loss	30–12–3	(Mexico) Carlos Cardoso	PTS	10	1958-08-23	Monterrey, Mexico	
Win	30–11–3	(United States) Dwight Hawkins	KO	7 (10)	1958-06-28	Mexico City, Mexico	
Win	29–11–3	(Mexico) Jose Luis Mora	PTS	10	1958-05-24	El Toreo de Cuatro Caminos, Mexico City, Mexico	
Loss	28–11–3	(Mexico) Carlos Cardoso	PTS	10	1958-04-26	Acapulco, Mexico	
Loss	28–10–3	(Cuba) Miguel Lazu	KO	4 (10)	1958-03-22	Mexico City, Mexico	
Loss	28–9–3	(Mexico) José Becerra	PTS	10	1958-02-08	Mexico City, Mexico	
Win	28–8–3	(Mexico) Eduardo Guerrero	PTS	10	1958-01-11	Mexico City, Mexico	
Win	27–8–3	(Mexico) David Rodriguez	KO	9 (10)	1957-12-07	Monterrey, Mexico	
Win	26–8–3	(Mexico) Raul Leanos	KO	4 (10)	1957-11-23	Monterrey, Mexico	
Win	25–8–3	(Mexico) David Rodriguez	PTS	10	1957-10-30	Mexico City, Mexico	
Loss	24–8–3	(Mexico) Mario de Leon	PTS	10	1957-09-07	Arena México, Mexico City, Mexico	
Loss	24–7–3	(Mexico) David Rodriguez	PTS	10	1957-08-05	Reynosa, Mexico	
Win	24–6–3	(Mexico) Chucho Gonzalez	KO	9 (10)	1957-07-01	Reynosa, Mexico	
Win	23–6–3	(Mexico) Mario Ruiz	TKO	8 (10)	1957-05-11	Mexico City, Mexico	
Win	22–6–3	(Mexico) Kildo Martinez	KO	10	1957-04-13	Mexico City, Mexico	
Win	21–6–3	(Honduras) Percy Lightburn	KO	4 (10)	1957-03-23	Acapulco, Mexico	
Loss	20–6–3	(Mexico) José Becerra	PTS	10	1957-03-02	Mexico City, Mexico	
Loss	20–5–3	(Mexico) José Becerra	PTS	10	1957-02-09	Monterrey, Mexico	
Win	20–4–3	(Mexico) Roque Fernandez	KO	9 (10)	1957-01-12	Mexico City, Mexico	
Win	19–4–3	(Mexico) Mike Garcia	KO	2 (10)	1956-12-15	Acapulco, Mexico	
Win	18–4–3	(Mexico) Chuy Guerrero	PTS	10	1956-11-22	Plaza de Toros, Torreón, Mexico	
Loss	17–4–3	(Mexico) Jose Luis Mora	KO	8 (10)	1956-10-31	Mexico City, Mexico	
Win	17–3–3	(Mexico) Cheto Fernandez	KO	3 (10)	1956-10-06	Mexico City, Mexico	
Win	16–3–3	(Mexico) Jorge Herrera	KO	8 (10)	1956-09-11	Arena Progresso, Guadalajara, Mexico	
Draw	15–3–3	(Mexico) Roque Fernandez	PTS	10	1956-08-15	Mexico City, Mexico	
Win	15–3–2	(Mexico) Ernesto Castaneda	KO	8 (10)	1956-07-11	Mexico City, Mexico	
Win	14–3–2	(Mexico) Mike Cruz	KO	2 (10)	1956-06-30	Arena México, Mexico City, Mexico	
Win	13–3–2	(Mexico) Juancito Lopez	PTS	8	1956-05-26	Mexico City, Mexico	
Win	12–3–2	(Mexico) Roque Fernandez	KO	3 (8)	1956-05-13	Acapulco, Mexico	
Win	11–3–2	(Mexico) Tony Alamillo	KO	2 (8)	1956-04-28	Mexico City, Mexico	
Win	10–3–2	(Mexico) Fili Maya	KO	1 (8)	1956-04-11	Mexico City, Mexico	
Win	9–3–2	(Mexico) Juancito Lopez	PTS	8	1956-03-21	Mexico City, Mexico	
Win	8–3–2	(Mexico) Daniel Silva	KO	7 (8)	1956-02-29	Mexico City, Mexico	
Loss	7–3–2	(Mexico) Roberto Mar	KO	9 (10)	1955-12-17	Acapulco, Mexico	
Draw	7–2–2	(Mexico) Roberto Mar	PTS	8	1955-12-03	Acapulco, Mexico	
Win	7–2–1	(Mexico) Eleazar Gonzalez	KO	2 (8)	1955-11-19	Arena Coliseo, Mexico City, Mexico	
Win	6–2–1	(Mexico) Zurdo Arce	KO	2 (8)	1955-11-05	Acapulco, Mexico	
Win	5–2–1	(Mexico) Juan Alcantara	KO	2 (8)	1955-10-22	Mexico City, Mexico	
Loss	4–2–1	(Mexico) Zurdo Arce	DQ	1 (6)	1955-10-01	Acapulco, Mexico	
Draw	4–1–1	(Mexico) Daniel Silva	PTS	6	1955-09-21	Arena Coliseo, Mexico City, Mexico	
Win	4–1	(Mexico) Salvador Mora	KO	5 (6)	1955-08-24	Mexico City, Mexico	
Win	3–1	(Mexico) Carlos Olivares	PTS	6	1955-07-20	Arena Coliseo, Mexico City, Mexico	
Win	2–1	(Mexico) Antonio Coria	PTS	4	1955-06-18	Arena Coliseo, Mexico City, Mexico	
Win	1–1	(Mexico) Mario Gabarro	PTS	4	1955-06-04	Mexico City, Mexico	
Loss	0–1	(Mexico) Heriberto Fuentas	KO	3 (4)	1955-03-19	Mexico City, Mexico	
