= Rocky Gattellari =

Australian boxer (1941–2023)

Personal information
- Nickname: The Rock
- Nationality: Australian
- Born: Rocco Gattellari; 6 September 1941 Oppido Mamertina, Italy
- Died: 23 June 2023 (aged 81) Sydney, Australia
- Height: 160 cm (5 ft 3 in)
- Weight: 51 kg (8 st 0 lb; 112 lb)

Boxing career
- Stance: Orthodox stance

Boxing record
- Total fights: 25
- Wins: 21
- Win by KO: 12
- Losses: 3
- Draws: 1

Rocco Gattellari (6 September 1941 – 23 June 2023) was an Italian–Australian boxer, Olympian, political candidate and businessman. He was the 2010 Inductee for the Australian National Boxing Hall of Fame Veterans category.

== Olympic Games ==
Gattellari was selected in the Australian team for the 1960 Summer Olympics in Rome, Italy. He defeated Abdelkader Belghiti from Morocco before losing to eventual gold medalist Gyula Török from Hungary.

== Professional career ==
Gattellari made his professional debut on 18 September 1961. On 26 February 1962 he won the Australian flyweight championship title, which he defended twice.Gattellari defeated several accomplished boxers including Danny Lee, Orizu Obilaso, Ray Perez (three times), Natalio Jimenez, Leo Zueleta, Eduardo Mojica before challenging for the World Flyweight title.

On 2 December 1965 he contested the world flyweight title, losing to Salvatore Burruni in the 13th round. On 11 December 1967 Gattellari fought Lionel Rose for the Australian bantamweight title, losing by a knockout in the 13th round. He retired in 1968.

Gattellari made a comeback in 1979, fighting Paul Ferreri for the Australian featherweight title. He lost by a TKO in the 3rd round.

Gattellari retired with a professional record of 21 wins (12 by knockout), three losses (all knockouts) and one draw.

== Retirement ==
Upon retirement Gattellari became a restaurateur, opening Berowra Waters Inn and then Rocky's at Edgecliff. He went on to become a finance broker.

Gattellari contested the 1995 New South Wales state election as the Liberal candidate for Cabramatta. He was defeated by Labor incumbent Reba Meagher who sought an apprehended violence order against him.

Gattellari died in Sydney on 23 June 2023, at the age of 81.

== Autobiography ==
- Gattellari, Rocky (1989). The Rocky Road. William Heinemann Australia. ISBN 0-85561-241-X.
