= Bernardo Caraballo =

Colombian boxer (1942–2022)

Bernardo Caraballo (1 January 1942 – 20 January 2022) was a Colombian boxer, and perennial world title contender, of the 1960s and 70s. He was born in Cartagena.

== Professional career ==
He was the first Colombian to contest a world title. Fights included matches with Fighting Harada, Pascual Pérez, Éder Jofre, and Ernesto Marcel.

== Death ==
Caraballo died from heart disease on 20 January 2022, at the age of 80.

== Legacy ==
His name ended up being used for the uncontacted Carabayo people of Amazonas.

The Coliseo Bernardo Caraballo in Cartagena is named after him.
