= Ray Perez =

American boxer

Personal information
- Born: January 25, 1939 Honolulu, Territory of Hawaii, U.S.
- Died: March 12, 2013 (aged 74) Sydney, New South Wales, Australia
- Weight: Flyweight; Bantamweight; Featherweight

Boxing career

Boxing record
- Total fights: 62
- Wins: 33
- Win by KO: 8
- Losses: 27
- Draws: 2

Ray Perez (January 25, 1939 – March 12, 2013) was an American professional boxer who competed from 1958 to 1970. As an amateur, he competed in the men's flyweight event at the 1956 Summer Olympics. He was also the National AAU flyweight champion in 1958. Perez turned professional in 1958. During his 12 year career he fought several boxers who became world champions namely Fighting Harada, Hiroyuki Ebihara, Walter McGowan, and Lionel Rose. Perez defeated Rose in 1966.
