= Lionel Rose =

Australian boxer (1948–2011)

Lionel Rose MBE
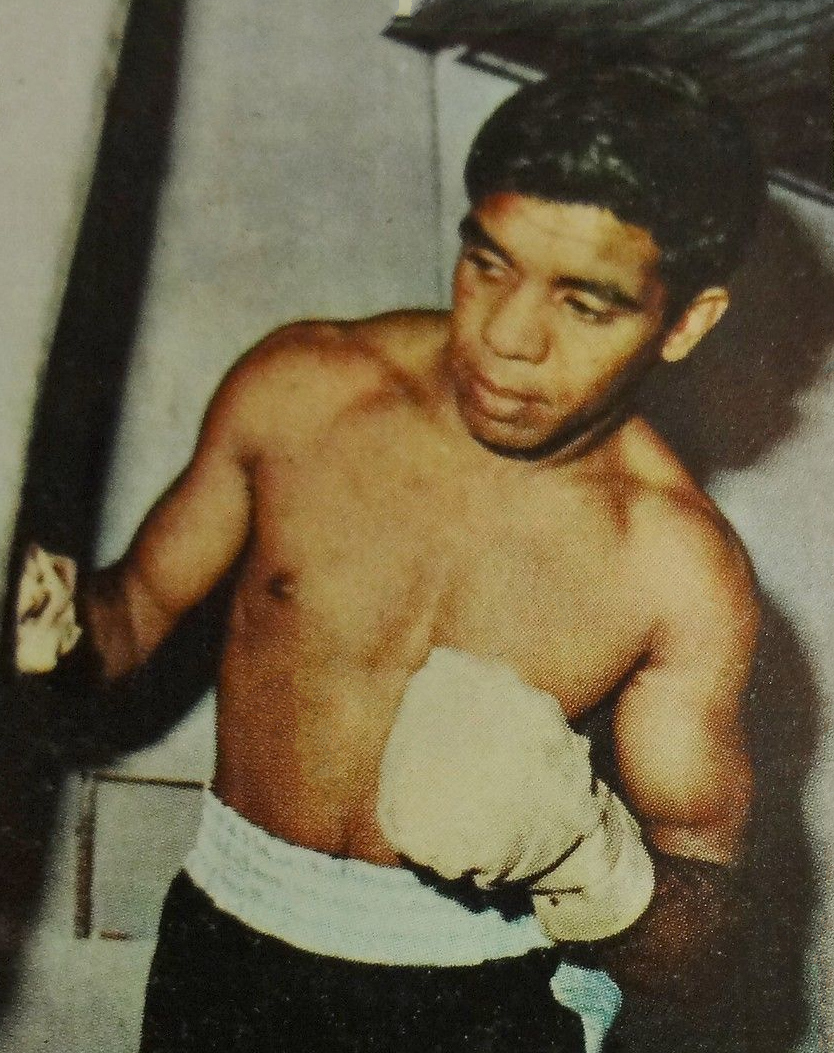
- Rose in 1968

Personal information
- Nickname: Slim
- Born: Lionel Edmund Rose; 21 June 1948 Labertouche, Victoria, Australia
- Died: 8 May 2011 (aged 62) Warragul, Victoria, Australia
- Height: 5 ft 5 1/2 in (166 cm)
- Weight: Bantamweight; Super-featherweight; Lightweight

Boxing career
- Stance: Orthodox

Boxing record
- Total fights: 53
- Wins: 42
- Win by KO: 12
- Losses: 11

Lionel Edmund Rose MBE (21 June 1948 – 8 May 2011) was an Australian professional boxer who competed from 1964 to 1976. He held the undisputed WBA, WBC, and The Ring bantamweight titles from 1968 to 1969, becoming the first Indigenous Australian to win a world title. He later became the first Indigenous Australian to be named Australian of the Year.

Rose was the 2003 inductee for the Australian National Boxing Hall of Fame "moderns" category and was the second person to be elevated to "legend" status in 2010.

== Background ==
Born and raised at Jacksons Track in Victoria as well as the town of Warragul, Rose grew up in hardship and learned to box from his father, Roy, who was a skilled fighter at local house shows. Rose was of the Gunditjmara (Dhauwurd Wurrung) people.

Later, at the age of 10, Rose was given a pair of boxing gloves by his teacher, Ian Hawkins (who observed him shadow boxing). Aged about 15, he went under the tutelage of Frank Oakes, a Warragul trainer (whose daughter Jenny he later married). He won the Australian amateur flyweight title at 15. He was the godfather to model and actress Ruby Rose.

== Professional boxing career ==
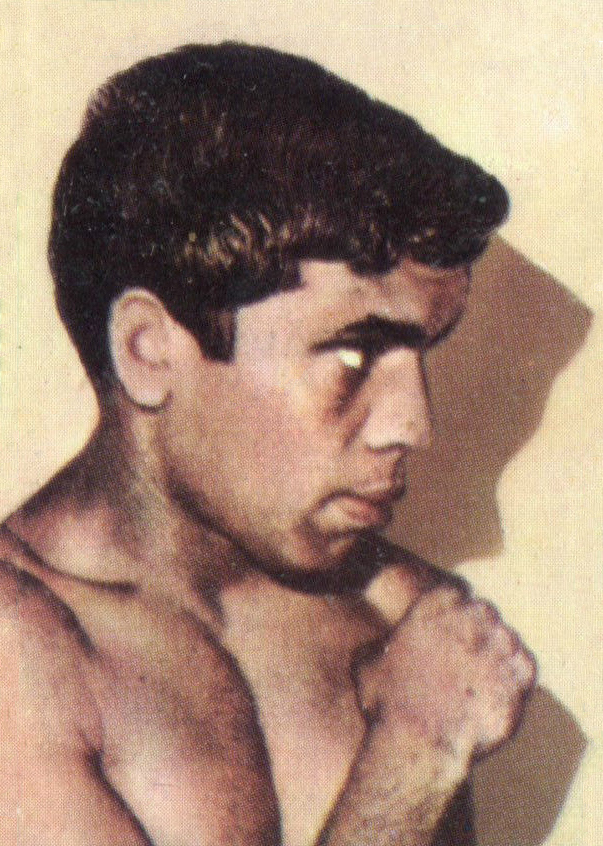
Rose c. 1969

After missing selection for the 1964 Olympic Games in Tokyo, Rose began his professional boxing career at age 16, on 9 September 1964, outpointing Mario Magris over eight rounds. This fight was in Warragul, but the majority of Rose's fights were held in Melbourne. Along the way he was helped by Jack and Shirley Rennie, in whose Melbourne home he stayed, training every day in their backyard gym.

After five wins in a row, on 23 July 1965, Rose was rematched with Singtong Por Tor, whom he had beaten in a 12-round decision. Por Tor inflicted Rose's first defeat, beating him on points in six rounds. On 14 October of the same year, he had his first fight abroad, beating Laurie Ny by a decision in 10 rounds at Christchurch, New Zealand.

Over his next nine fights, Rose had a record of eight wins and one loss, with one knockout. The lone loss in those nine fights was to Ray Perez, against whom Rose split a pair of bouts. Then at age 18, on 28 October 1966, he met Noel Kunde at Melbourne for the Australian bantamweight title. He won the title by defeating Kunde in a 15-round decision.

Rose won one more bout in 1966 and eight in 1967 (including a thirteenth-round knockout win against Rocky Gattellari to defend his Australian championship) before challenging Fighting Harada for the world bantamweight title on 26 February 1968 in Tokyo. Rose made history by becoming the first Aboriginal Australian to be a world champion boxer when he defeated Harada in a 15-round decision. This win made Rose an instant national hero in Australia and an icon among Aboriginal Australians. A public reception at Melbourne Town Hall was witnessed by a crowd of more than 10,000. On 2 July of that year, he returned to Tokyo to retain his title with a 15-round decision win over Takao Sakurai. Then, on 6 December, he met Chucho Castillo at the Inglewood Forum in Inglewood, California. Rose beat Castillo by decision, but the points verdict in favour of him infuriated many in the pro-Castillo crowd and a riot began: 14 fans and fight referee Dick Young were hospitalised for injuries received.

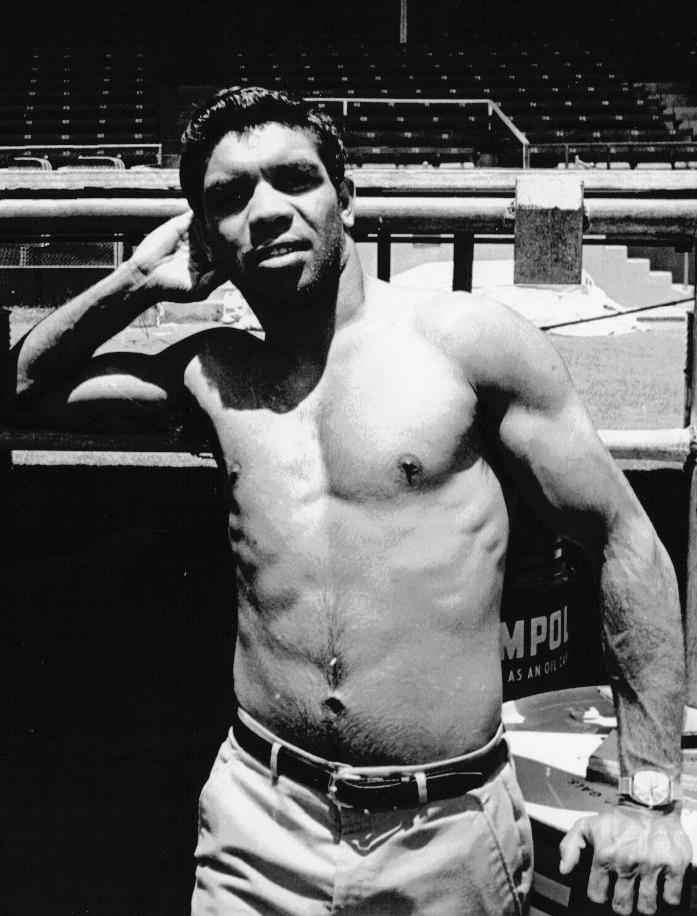
Rose in 1969

On 8 March 1969, Rose retained the title with a 15-round decision over Alan Rudkin, but five months later he returned to Inglewood, where he faced Rubén Olivares on 22 August. Rose lost the world bantamweight title to Olivares via a fifth-round knockout.

Rose continued boxing after his defeat against Olivares, but, after defeats against practically unknown fighters, many believed he was done as a prime fighter. However, he was far from finished: he upset future world lightweight champion Itshimatsu Suzuki on 10 October 1970 in a 10-round decision, and once again, he positioned himself as a world title challenger, albeit in the lightweight division, 17 pounds over the division where he crowned himself world champion.

Despite having lost to Jeff White for the Australian lightweight title, Rose got another world title try when he faced WBC world junior lightweight champion Yoshiaki Numata, on 30 May 1971 at Hiroshima. Numata beat Rose by a fifteen-round decision, and Rose announced his retirement soon after.

In 1975, he came back, but after losing four of his next six bouts, including one against Rafael Limón, Rose decided to retire for good. Rose compiled a record of 42 wins and 11 losses as a professional boxer, with 12 wins by knockout.

== Singing career ==
During his time off from boxing in the 1970s, Rose embarked on a modest singing career in Australia having hits with "I Thank You" and "Please Remember Me" in 1970. Produced and written by Johnny Young and engineered by John L Sayers, the song "I Thank You" was a top 5 nationwide hit. Comedic sports commentators Roy Slaven and H.G. Nelson played it as a substitute to the Australian national anthem during radio broadcasts of the State of Origin series and other sporting events.

It is widely thought that Rose's singing career didn't give him time to get enough preparation training in, which is why he lost bouts against so many unknown fighters (after his loss to Ruben Olivares).

Rose sang "Jackson Track" and "I Thank You", in both the SBS documentary and accompanying CD, Buried Country: The Story of Aboriginal Country Music.

=== Studio albums ===
Title	Album details
I Thank You	Released: 1970; Format: LP; Label: Festival Records (SFL-933741)
Jackson's Track	Released: 1971; Format: LP; Label: Festival Records (SFL-934166)

=== Singles ===
List of singles, with Australian chart positions
Year	Title	Peak chart positions	Album
Year	Title	AUS	Album
1969	"I Thank You" / "Pick Me Up on Your Way Down"	2	I Thank You
1970	"Please Remember Me" / "Good Old Country Song"	40	I Thank You
1970	"Little Ole You" / "Guitar Pickin' Boy"	-	I Thank You

== Retirement ==
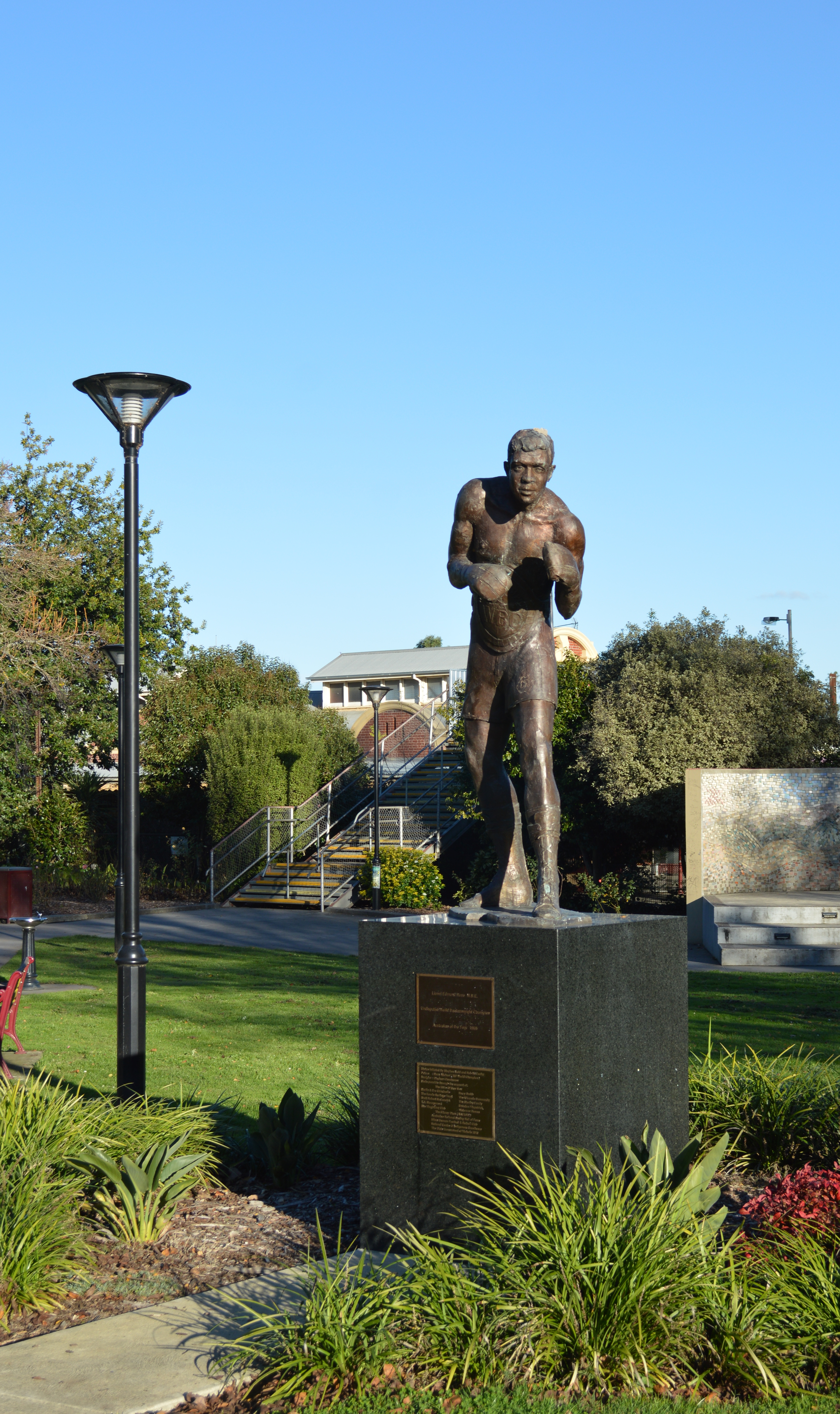
A statue of Rose in Warragul

In retirement, Rose became a successful businessman, and he enjoyed the monetary benefits his career brought him. Rose was showcased in 2002 in The Ring section 'Where are they now?'.

In 2007, Rose suffered a stroke that left him with speech and movement difficulties.

Rose died on 8 May 2011 after an illness which lasted for several months.

== Awards ==
Rose was featured in Australian author: Wendy Lewis's book of "Australia's Greatest People" in 2010.

In 1968, Lionel Rose became the first Aboriginal Australian of the Year and was appointed a Member of the Order of the British Empire (MBE) in the Birthday Honours List for services to sport.

In 1969, Lionel Rose was granted the "Key to the City of Gold Coast", only the second recipient of the city's highest honor.

In the 1960s, he won the Australian Amateur Flyweight title.

In 2003, he was an inaugural inductee in the Australian National Boxing Hall of Fame.

In 2005, he was featured on a stamp (part of the 2005 edition).

In 2005, Rose was also awarded the E9 title of 'King of the Ring'.

In 2011, he was inducted to the Victorian Aboriginal Honour Roll.

== TV and film ==
His life inspired the TV serial The Battlers (1968) about an Aboriginal boxer, played by Vincent Gill in blackface.

The TV miniseries Rose Against the Odds was produced in 1991 – a period drama of Rose's life story starring Paul Williams and Telly Savalas. It was released as a feature film in 1995.

In 2008, after nearly three years of conducting interviews with Rose, his family and friends, Melbourne filmmaker Eddie Martin premiered his feature-length documentary Lionel at the Melbourne International Film Festival. After a brief theatrical run, a shorter version of the film premiered on SBS television on 28 November 2008.

== Professional boxing record ==
53 fights	42 wins	11 losses
By knockout	12	5
By decision	30	6

No.	Result	Record	Opponent	Type	Round	Date	Location	Notes
53	Loss	42–11	Maurice Apeang	KO	2 (10)	18 Dec 1976	Une Grande Soiree Stadium, Noumea, New Caledonia	
52	Loss	42–10	Rafael Limon	TKO	3 (10)	28 Aug 1976	Forum, Inglewood, California, U.S.	
51	Win	42–9	Giuseppe Agate	TKO	3 (10)	13 Nov 1975	Olympic Swimming Stadium, Melbourne, Australia	
50	Loss	41–9	Billy Moeller	PTS	10	8 Oct 1975	Marrickville RSL Club, Sydney, Australia	
49	Loss	41–8	Blakeney Kid Matthews	MD	10	29 Aug 1975	Melbourne Olympic Pool, Melbourne, Australia	
48	Win	41–7	Bomber Uchida	PTS	10	30 Jun 1975	Merdeka Stadium, Kuala Lumpur, Malaysia	
47	Loss	40–7	Yoshiaki Numata	UD	15	30 May 1971	Prefectural Gymnasium, Hiroshima, Japan	For WBC super-featherweight title
46	Win	40–6	Tanny Cuaresma	KO	1 (10)	4 May 1971	Channel 10 Studios, Melbourne, Australia	
45	Loss	39–6	Jeff White	UD	15	12 Feb 1971	Milton Tennis Courts, Brisbane, Australia	
44	Win	39–5	Guts Ishimatsu	UD	10	10 Oct 1970	Palais Theatre, Saint Kilda, Melbourne, Australia	
43	Win	38–5	Richard Kid Borias	KO	3 (10)	4 Aug 1970	San Remo Ballroom, Melbourne, Australia	
42	Win	37–5	Freddie Wicks	PTS	10	14 Jul 1970	Eastern Suburbs Rugby League Club, Sydney, Australia	
41	Loss	36–5	Raul Cruz	UD	10	16 May 1970	Forum, Inglewood, California, U.S.	
40	Win	36–4	Don Johnson	UD	10	7 Mar 1970	White City Tennis Courts, Sydney, Australia	
39	Loss	35–4	Fernando Sotelo	KO	7 (12)	7 Dec 1969	White City Tennis Courts, Sydney, Australia	
38	Win	35–3	Vincente Garcia	KO	5 (10)	1 Nov 1969	Melbourne Olympic Velodrome, Melbourne, Australia	
37	Loss	34–3	Rubén Olivares	KO	5 (15)	22 Aug 1969	Forum, Inglewood, California, U.S.	Lost WBA, WBC, and The Ring bantamweight titles
36	Win	34–2	Ernie Cruz	MD	10	10 Jun 1969	Honolulu International Center, Honolulu, Hawaii, U.S.	
35	Win	33–2	Alan Rudkin	SD	15	8 Mar 1969	Kooyong Tennis Stadium, Melbourne, Australia	Retained WBA, WBC, and The Ring bantamweight titles
34	Win	32–2	Chucho Castillo	SD	15	6 Dec 1968	Forum, Inglewood, California, U.S.	Retained WBA, WBC, and The Ring bantamweight titles
33	Win	31–2	José Medel	MD	10	28 Aug 1968	Forum, Inglewood, California, U.S.	
32	Win	30–2	Takao Sakurai	MD	15	2 Jun 1968	Nippon Budokan, Japan	Retained WBA, WBC, and The Ring bantamweight titles
31	Win	29–2	Tommaso Galli	PTS	10	26 Apr 1968	Festival Hall, Melbourne, Australia	
30	Win	28–2	Fighting Harada	UD	15	27 Feb 1968	Nippon Budokan, Tokyo, Japan	Won WBA, WBC, and The Ring bantamweight titles
29	Win	27–2	Rocky Gattellari	KO	13 (15)	11 Dec 1967	Sydney Stadium, Sydney, Australia	
28	Win	26–2	Gary Garber	PTS	10	20 Nov 1967	Sydney Stadium, Sydney	
27	Win	25–2	Kamara Diop	TKO	3 (10)	13 Oct 1967	Festival Hall, Melbourne, Australia	
26	Win	24–2	Ronnie Jones	PTS	10	1 Sep 1967	Festival Hall, Melbourne, Australia	
25	Win	23–2	Tiny Palacio	PTS	10	28 Jul 1967	Festival Hall, Melbourne, Australia	
24	Win	22–2	Rudy Corona	PTS	10	9 Jun 1967	Festival Hall, Melbourne, Australia	
23	Win	21–2	Akihide Tamaoka	KO	6 (10)	11 May 1967	Festival Hall, Melbourne, Australia	
22	Win	20–2	Nevio Carbi	PTS	10	17 Mar 1967	Festival Hall, Melbourne, Australia	
21	Win	19–2	Felipe Gonzalez	PTS	10	18 Nov 1966	Festival Hall, Melbourne, Australia	
20	Win	18–2	Noel Kunde	PTS	15	28 Oct 1966	Festival Hall, Melbourne, Australia	
19	Win	17–2	Jackie Burke	TKO	6 (12)	14 Oct 1966	Festival Hall, Melbourne, Australia	
18	Win	16–2	Noel Kunde	PTS	12	26 Aug 1966	Festival Hall, Melbourne, Australia	
17	Win	15–2	Ray Perez	PTS	12	8 Jul 1966	Festival Hall, Melbourne, Australia	
16	Win	14–2	Flash Dumdum	PTS	12	17 Jun 1966	Festival Hall, Melbourne, Australia	
15	Win	13–2	Jerry Stokes	PTS	12	13 May 1966	Festival Hall, Melbourne, Australia	
14	Loss	12–2	Ray Perez	UD	10	4 Apr 1966	Sydney Stadium, Sydney, Australia	
13	Win	12–1	Ray Perez	UD	12	18 Feb 1966	Sydney Showgrounds, Sydney, Australia	
12	Win	11–1	Arthur Clarke	UD	8	2 Dec 1965	Sydney Showgrounds, Sydney, Australia	
11	Win	10–1	Billy Brown	UD	12	5 Nov 1965	Festival Hall, Melbourne, Australia	
10	Win	9–1	Laurie Ny	UD	10	14 Oct 1965	Christchurch, Canterbury, New Zealand	
9	Win	8–1	Billy Brown	TKO	10 (12)	1 Oct 1965	Festival Hall, Melbourne, Australia	
8	Win	7–1	Bobby Wells	TKO	8 (12)	20 Aug 1965	Festival Hall, Melbourne, Australia	
7	Win	6–1	Teddy Rainbow	PTS	12	27 Jul 1965	Saint George Rugby League Club, Sydney, Australia	
6	Loss	5–1	Singtong Por Tor	PTS	6	23 Jul 1965	Festival Hall, Melbourne, Australia	
5	Win	5–0	Singtong Por Tor	PTS	12	25 Jun 1965	Festival Hall, Melbourne, Australia	
4	Win	4–0	Jackie Bruce	TKO	1 (12)	2 Apr 1965	Festival Hall, Melbourne, Australia	
3	Win	3–0	Joe Oliveri	TKO	2 (6)	6 Nov 1964	Festival Hall, Melbourne, Australia	
2	Win	2–0	Mario Magris	PTS	8	9 Oct 1964	Festival Hall, Melbourne, Australia	
1	Win	1–0	Mario Magris	PTS	8	9 Sep 1964	Warragul, Australia	

== Titles in boxing ==
=== Major world titles ===
- WBA bantamweight champion (118 lbs)
- WBC bantamweight champion (118 lbs)

=== The Ring magazine titles ===
- The Ring bantamweight champion (118 lbs)

=== Undisputed titles ===
- Undisputed bantamweight champion

== See also ==
- List of bantamweight boxing champions
- List of WBA world champions
- List of WBC world champions
- List of The Ring world champions
- List of undisputed boxing champions

Sporting positions
World boxing titles
Preceded by Fighting Harada	WBA bantamweight champion 27 February 1968 – 22 August 1969	Succeeded by Rubén Olivares
Preceded by Fighting Harada	WBC bantamweight champion 27 February 1968 – 22 August 1969	Succeeded by Rubén Olivares
Preceded by Fighting Harada	The Ring bantamweight champion 27 February 1968 – 22 August 1969	Succeeded by Rubén Olivares
Preceded by Fighting Harada	Undisputed bantamweight champion 27 February 1968 – 22 August 1969	Succeeded by Rubén Olivares
