= Herman Leyva Marques =

American boxer

Herman Leyva Marquez (January 1, 1934 – October 3, 2006) was a professional boxer. Marques was a native of the Mexican state of Sonora, although he was raised in Stockton, California, in the United States.

Marquez was 20–10 with six knockouts and one draw as a professional from 1957 to 1962. In 1957, Marquez won the National AAU Bantamweight Championship. He fought Brazilian Eder Jofre for the World Bantamweight Title on May 4, 1962, at the Cow Palace in San Francisco. Marques was ahead on points but was knocked down twice in the 10th round of their scheduled 15-round bout and lost by technical knockout.

Marquez earned the bantamweight title shot after defeating Ignacio Pina by unanimous decision on December 15, 1961, and Carlos Hernandez by decision on October 19, 1961, in bantamweight title eliminators at the Olympic Auditorium in Los Angeles.

He won the North American Bantamweight Title on points over Baby Moe Mario on May 29, 1960, at Municipal Playground in Carson City, Nevada, and the California State Bantamweight Title by decision over Ronnie Perez on June 12, 1961, in Stockton.
