= José Toluco López =

Mexican boxer (1932–1972)

Personal information
- Nickname: Toluco
- Born: José López Hernández; June 21, 1932 El Oro, State of Mexico
- Died: December 16, 1972 (aged 40)
- Height: 5 ft 7 in (170 cm)
- Weight: Lightweight; Featherweight; Bantamweight

Boxing career
- Reach: 70 in (180 cm)
- Stance: Orthodox

Boxing record
- Total fights: 124
- Wins: 99
- Win by KO: 63
- Losses: 20
- Draws: 4
- No contests: 1

José López Hernández, also known as Toluco (June 21, 1932 – December 16, 1972) was a Mexican professional boxer. He was one of the most popular boxers from Mexico.

== Professional career ==
In May 1955, he beat Fili Nava to win the Mexican bantamweight title.

=== López vs. Monroe ===
His biggest fight came in Legion Stadium, Hollywood, California against the champion Boots Monroe. The bout was for the North American Bantamweight Championship and Before a capacity crowd Lopez "shocked" the crowd by stopping Monroe in just two rounds. Monroe got off to a good start, employing the long left jab for which he was noted. Near the end of the round, however, Toluco stepped in and nailed Monroe with a hard right and visibly shook him. In the second round, Lopez came out fast and dropped a still dazed Monroe three times before the referee "mercifully" put a stop to the beating.
