= Éder Jofre =

Brazilian boxer (1936–2022)

Eder Jofre
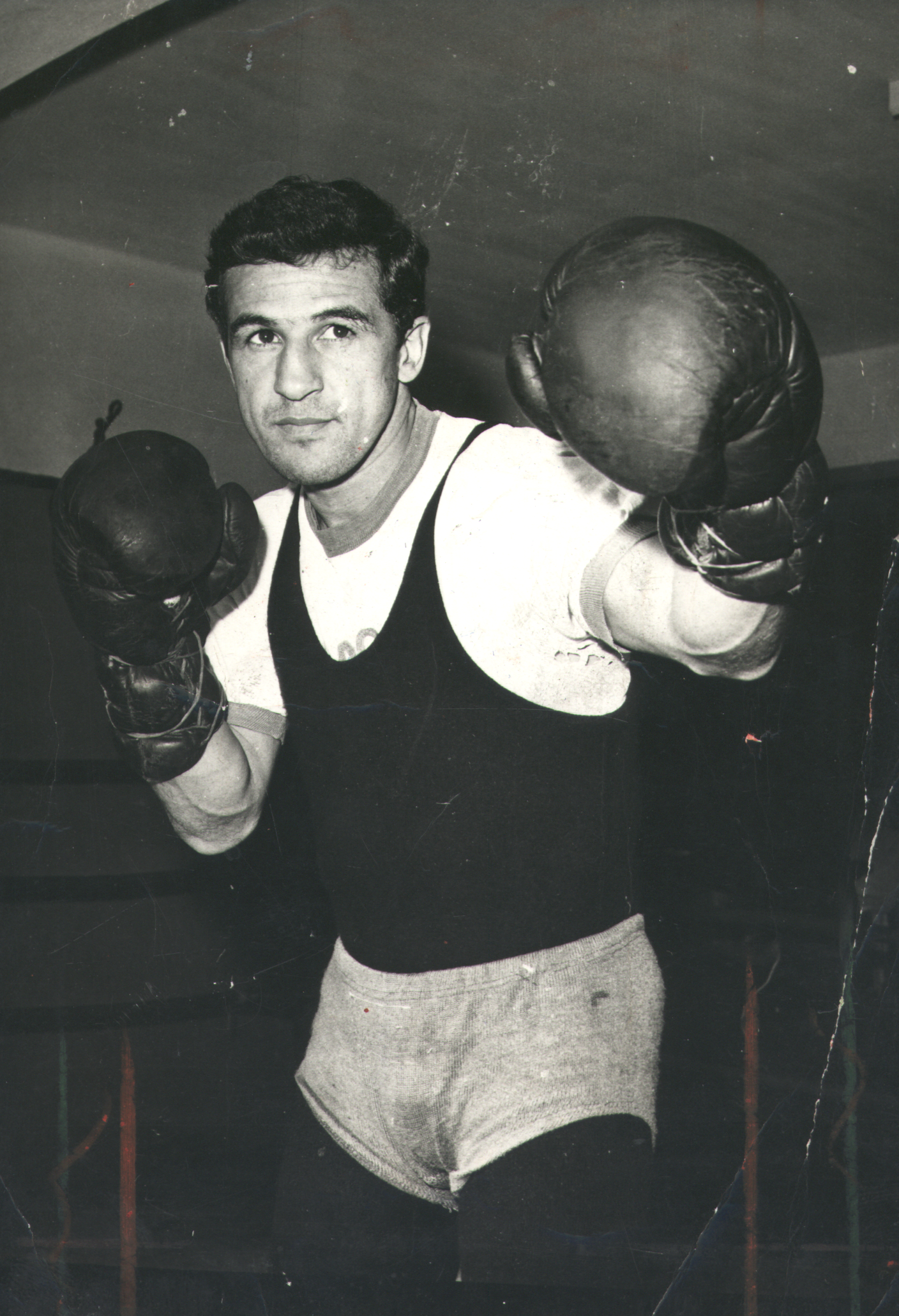
- Jofre in 1970

Personal information
- Nicknames: "Galinho de Ouro" ("Little Golden Rooster") "Jofrinho" ("Lil' Jofre")
- Born: Eder Jofre; 26 March 1936 São Paulo, Brazil
- Died: 2 October 2022 (aged 86) Embu das Artes, Brazil
- Height: 1.63 m (5 ft 4 in)
- Weight: Bantamweight; Featherweight

Boxing career
- Reach: 168 cm (66 in)
- Stance: Orthodox

Boxing record
- Total fights: 78
- Wins: 72
- Win by KO: 50
- Losses: 2
- Draws: 4

Eder Jofre (Portuguese pronunciation: [ˈɛdeʁ ˈʒofɾi]; 26 March 1936 – 2 October 2022) was a Brazilian professional boxer and architect who was both bantamweight and featherweight world champion. He is considered by many to be the greatest bantamweight boxer of all time.

In 2019, he was voted the 16th greatest boxer of all time, which made him the third greatest living boxer (behind only Roberto Durán and Sugar Ray Leonard) by "The International Boxing Research Organization". In 2002, he was named the 19th greatest fighter of the past 80 years by The Ring magazine. In 1996, he was rated the 9th greatest boxer of the previous 50 years. He is ranked #85 on Ring Magazine's 100 Greatest Punchers Of All Time list.

In 1992, Jofre was inducted into the International Boxing Hall of Fame in Canastota, New York, and remains the only Brazilian thus honored.

== Amateur career ==
Jofre represented his native country at the 1956 Summer Olympics in Melbourne, Australia.

=== Olympic results ===
- First round bye
- Defeated Thein Myint (Burma) on points
- Lost to Claudio Barrientos (Chile) on points

== Professional career ==
Éder Jofre, a son of Aristides Jofre, whose nicknames (Eder's) were "Galinho de Ouro" (="Golden Bantam") and "Jofrinho", made his professional debut on 23 March 1957, beating Raul Lopez by knockout in five rounds. He had twelve fights in 1957, including two each against Lopez, Osvaldo Perez, and Ernesto Miranda, the last of whom against whom Jofre sustained his first two record stains: two ten-round draws (ties).

In 1958, Jofre won four more fights, and then, on 14 May of that year, he had his first fight abroad, drawing in ten rounds against Ruben Caceres in Montevideo, Uruguay. On 14 November, Jose Smecca became the only man to drop Jofre in his career; Jofre got up from a first-round knockdown to knock Smecca out in seven rounds.

Jofre won eight fights in 1959, including one against two-time world title challenger Leo Espinoza and a seventh-round knockout in a rematch with Caceres.

On 19 February 1960, he fought Ernesto Miranda for the third time, this time with the South American Bantamweight title on the line. Jofre outpointed Miranda over fifteen rounds to win his first title as a professional. Jofre retained the title with a knockout in three rounds in the fourth fight with Miranda, and, after one more win, he made his U.S. debut, defeating top-ranked challenger Jose Medel by knockout in ten rounds on 16 August in Los Angeles. Next, he defeated the power-punching Ricardo Moreno (later ranked among boxing's all-time best punchers by Ring Magazine), by a knockout in the sixth round.

On 18 November of that year, Jofre became world champion, when he knocked out Eloy Sanchez in six rounds, in Los Angeles, to claim the vacant WBA World Bantamweight title.

Jofre proved to be a busy world champion, fighting top-notch fighters, both in title engagements and in non-title fights. From 1960 to 1965, he retained his title against Piero Rollo, Ramon Arias (in Caracas, Venezuela), Johnny Caldwell, Herman Marques, Jose Medel, Katsuyoshi Aoki (in Tokyo), Johnny Jamito (in Manila), and Bernardo Caraballo (in Bogotá, Colombia).

In addition, he defeated such fighters as Billy Peacock, Sadao Yaoita, and Fernando Soto in non-title bouts. After the fight with Aoki, Jofre was also recognized as World Bantamweight Champion by the WBC, therefore, becoming the Undisputed World Champion.

On 17 May 1965, his streak as an undefeated fighter was broken when he lost to "Fighting Harada" by a controversial fifteen-round split decision in Nagoya, Japan, to lose the world Bantamweight title.

After losing to Harada by unanimous decision at a rematch held in Tokyo on 1 June 1966, Jofre retired.

In 1969, he made a comeback, beating Rudy Corona by a knockout in six rounds on 26 August. After winning thirteen fights in a row, he challenged for a world title once again: on 5 May 1973, he fought Jose Legra for the Lineal and WBC featherweight titles, in Brasília. Jofre became a two-division world champion by defeating Legra with a fifteen-round majority decision.

Despite having won his second world title, Jofre realized he was nearing the end of the road as far as his boxing career was concerned. He defeated Frankie Crawford in a non-title affair and defended his world Featherweight title against fellow former world Bantamweight champion Vicente Saldivar of Mexico, in a "super fight" held at Salvador. He knocked Saldivar out in four rounds.

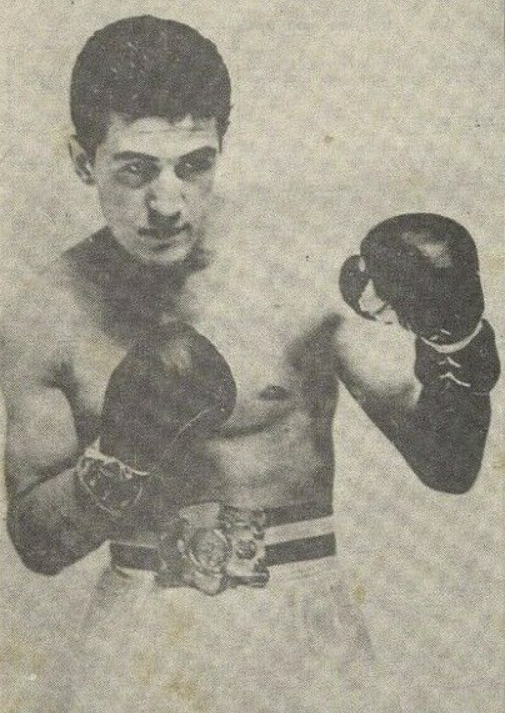
Éder Jofre in 1962

After a string of fights against lesser opponents, he retired, having beaten the Mexican Octavio Gomez by a unanimous but controversial decision (120 – 110 by judge Antonio Di, 119 – 115 by judge Adriano Carollo and 117 – 116 by judge Américo Vieira) in São Paulo on 8 October 1976. In this last fight, Jofre was slow and uncertain, and himself put in doubt the correctness of the arbiter's decision ("Digam o que disserem, eu não venci Famoso Gomez" he said to the Rio de Janeiro newspaper O Globo).

Jofre had a record of 72–2–4 (50 KOs), making him a member of the exclusive group of boxers who have won 50 or more fights by knockout.

== After boxing ==
Jofre worked in politics, serving as an alderman for the city of São Paulo for 16 years. He then worked for DERSA, a state-owned company, working with the highways of São Paulo. In 2004, a DVD of Jofre's life titled "O Grande Campeão" was released. On Jofre's 85th birthday, in 2021, the first English language biography of his life was released. The book titled "Eder Jofre: Brazil's First Boxing World Champion", by family friend and author Christopher J. Smith won the "'Book of the Year'" at the "West Coast Boxing Hall of Fame" in October 2021 at the Loews Hotel in Hollywood, California. Present at the event was Jofre and his son, Marcel, and daughter, Andrea. Jofre was in Los Angeles to be inducted into the "West Coast Boxing Hall of Fame" and on this trip he re-visited the site of his bantamweight world title victory, The Olympic Auditorium - his first visit to the venue since that evening on 18 November 1960.

== Exhibitions and calisthenics ==
Jofre occasionally came out of retirement to fight exhibitions. Some of his more noteworthy exhibitions were against Servilio de Oliveira and Alexis Arguello. In 2010, at age 74, Jofre, a physical fitness fanatic who was still the reflection of great health, put out a calisthenics video.

== Vegetarianism ==
Jofre was a vegetarian. He has been described as one of the few vegetarians ever to win a boxing world championship. He became a vegetarian at the age of 20 after reading a book that stated meat consumption was unhealthy for the body. Jofre adhered to his strict vegetarian diet from the age of 20 and commented in 2019 "I even feel disgust today when I see people eating meat... I eat pasta, rice and beans, boiled potatoes or fried and very sporadically egg. I drink milk, yogurt, curds, and honey".

== Illness and death ==
Jofre suffered from chronic traumatic encephalopathy. He was hospitalized in March 2022 at a clinic in Embu das Artes because of pneumonia. He died on 2 October due to complications from the disease. He was 86.

== Professional boxing record ==
78 fights	72 wins	2 losses
By knockout	50	0
By decision	22	2
Draws	4	

No.	Result	Record	Opponent	Type	Round, time	Date	Location	Notes
78	Win	72–2–4	Octavio Gomez	UD	12	1976-10-08	Ginásio do Ibirapuera, São Paulo, São Paulo	
77	Win	71–2–4	Juan Antonio López	UD	10	1976-08-13	Ginásio do Ibirapuera, São Paulo, São Paulo	
76	Win	70–2–4	Jose Antonio Jimenez	UD	10	1976-07-02	Ginásio do Corinthians, São Paulo, São Paulo	
75	Win	69–2–4	Pasqualino Morbidelli	KO	4 (10), 1:07	1976-05-29	Ginásio do Ibirapuera, São Paulo, São Paulo	
74	Win	68–2–4	Michel Lefevbre	KO	3 (10), 1:15	1976-05-02	Ginásio Presidente Medici, Brasília	
73	Win	67–2–4	Enzo Farinelli	KO	4 (10)	1976-02-24	Porto Alegre, Rio Grande do Sul	
72	Win	66–2–4	Niliberto Herrera	UD	10	1975-01-03	Jundiaí, São Paulo	
71	Win	65–2–4	Vicente Saldivar	KO	4 (15)	1973-10-21	Ginásio Municipal, Bauru, São Paulo	Retained WBC featherweight title
70	Win	64–2–4	Frankie Crawford	UD	10	1973-08-25	Ginásio Municipal, Bauru, São Paulo	
69	Win	63–2–4	Godfrey Stevens	KO	4 (10)	1973-07-21	Ginásio do Ibirapuera, São Paulo, São Paulo	
68	Win	62–2–4	José Legrá	MD	15	1973-05-05	Ginásio Presidente Medici, Brasília	Won WBC featherweight title
67	Win	61–2–4	Djiemai Belhadri	KO	3 (10)	1972-09-29	Ginásio do Ibirapuera, São Paulo, São Paulo	
66	Win	60–2–4	Shig Fukuyama	TKO	9 (10)	1972-08-18	Ginásio do Ibirapuera, São Paulo, São Paulo	
65	Win	59–2–4	Jose Bisbal	KO	2 (10)	1972-06-30	Ginásio do Ibirapuera, São Paulo, São Paulo	
64	Win	58–2–4	Felix Figueroa	PTS	10	1972-04-28	Ginásio do Ibirapuera, São Paulo, São Paulo	
63	Win	57–2–4	Guillermo Morales	KO	6 (10), 2:35	1972-03-24	Ginásio do Ibirapuera, São Paulo, São Paulo	
62	Win	56–2–4	Robert Porcel	KO	2 (10), 2:37	1971-10-29	Ginásio do Ibirapuera, São Paulo, São Paulo	
61	Win	55–2–4	Tony Jumao-As	PTS	10	1971-09-10	Ginásio do Ibirapuera, São Paulo, São Paulo	
60	Win	54–2–4	Domenico Chiloiro	PTS	10	1971-07-09	Ginásio do Ibirapuera, São Paulo, São Paulo	
59	Win	53–2–4	Jerry Stokes	KO	2 (10)	1971-03-26	Ginásio do Ibirapuera, São Paulo, São Paulo	
58	Win	52–2–4	Giovanni Girgenti	PTS	10	1970-11-06	Ginásio do Ibirapuera, São Paulo, São Paulo	
57	Win	51–2–4	Roberto Wong	KO	3 (10)	1970-09-25	Ginásio do Ibirapuera, São Paulo, São Paulo	
56	Win	50–2–4	Manny Elias	UD	10	1970-05-29	Ginásio do Ibirapuera, São Paulo, São Paulo	
55	Win	49–2–4	Nevio Carbi	PTS	10	1970-01-30	Ginásio do Ibirapuera, São Paulo, São Paulo	
54	Win	48–2–4	Rudy Corona	KO	6 (10)	1969-08-27	Ginásio do Ibirapuera, São Paulo, São Paulo	
53	Loss	47–2–4	Fighting Harada	UD	15	1966-05-31	Nippon Budokan, Tokyo	For WBA, WBC, and The Ring bantamweight titles
52	Draw	47–1–4	Manny Elias	PTS	10	1965-11-05	Ginásio do Ibirapuera, São Paulo, São Paulo	
51	Loss	47–1–3	Fighting Harada	SD	15	1965-05-18	Aichi Prefectural Gymnasium, Nagoya, Aichi	Lost WBA, WBC, and The Ring bantamweight titles
50	Win	47–0–3	Bernardo Caraballo	KO	7 (15), 2:50	1964-11-27	Plaza de Toros de Santamaría, Bogotá	Retained WBA, WBC, and The Ring bantamweight titles
49	Win	46–0–3	Johnny Jamito	TKO	12 (15)	1963-05-18	Araneta Coliseum, Quezon City, Metro Manila	Retained WBA, WBC, and The Ring bantamweight titles
48	Win	45–0–3	Katsutoshi Aoki	KO	3 (15), 2:12	1963-04-04	Kokugikan, Tokyo	Retained WBA, WBC, and The Ring bantamweight titles
47	Win	44–0–3	José Medel	KO	6 (15)	1962-09-11	Ginásio do Ibirapuera, São Paulo, São Paulo	Retained WBA, NYSAC, and The Ring bantamweight titles
46	Win	43–0–3	Herman Marques	TKO	10 (15), 2:15	1962-05-04	Cow Palace, Daly City, California	Retained NBA, NYSAC, and The Ring bantamweight titles
45	Win	42–0–3	Johnny Caldwell	TKO	10 (15), 2:45	1962-01-18	Ginásio do Ibirapuera, São Paulo, São Paulo	Retained NBA and The Ring bantamweight titles Won vacant NYSAC bantamweight title
44	Win	41–0–3	Fernando Gonçalves	KO	8 (10), 1:45	1961-12-06	Ginásio do Ibirapuera, São Paulo, São Paulo	
43	Win	40–0–3	Ramon Arias	TKO	7 (15)	1961-08-19	Estadio Universitario, Caracas	Retained NBA and The Ring bantamweight titles
42	Win	39–0–3	Sadao Yaoita	KO	10 (10), 2:12	1961-07-26	Ginásio do Ibirapuera, São Paulo, São Paulo	
41	Win	38–0–3	Sugar Ray	KO	2 (10)	1961-04-18	Ginásio do Estádio Pacaembu, São Paulo, São Paulo	
40	Win	37–0–3	Piero Rollo	RTD	9 (15)	1961-03-02	Botafogo Stadium, Rio de Janeiro, Rio de Janeiro	Retained NBA bantamweight title Won vacant The Ring bantamweight title
39	Win	36–0–3	Billy Peacock	KO	2 (10)	1960-12-16	Ginásio do Ibirapuera, São Paulo, São Paulo	
38	Win	35–0–3	Eloy Sanchez	KO	6 (15), 1:30	1960-11-18	Grand Olympic Auditorium, Los Angeles, California	Won vacant NBA bantamweight title
37	Win	34–0–3	Ricardo Moreno	TKO	6 (10)	1960-09-30	Ginásio do Ibirapuera, São Paulo, São Paulo	
36	Win	33–0–3	José Medel	KO	10 (12)	1960-08-18	Grand Olympic Auditorium, Los Angeles, California	
35	Win	32–0–3	Claudio Barrientos	TKO	8 (10)	1960-07-15	Ginásio do Ibirapuera, São Paulo, São Paulo	
34	Win	31–0–3	Ernesto Miranda	KO	3 (15), 2:20	1960-06-10	Ginásio do Ibirapuera, São Paulo, São Paulo	Retained South American bantamweight title
33	Win	30–0–3	Ernesto Miranda	PTS	15	1960-02-19	Ginásio do Ibirapuera, São Paulo, São Paulo	Won South American bantamweight title
32	Win	29–0–3	Danny Kid	UD	10	1959-12-12	Ginásio do Ibirapuera, São Paulo, São Paulo	
31	Win	28–0–3	Giovanni Zuddas	PTS	10	1959-10-30	Ginásio do Ibirapuera, São Paulo, São Paulo	
30	Win	27–0–3	Angel Bustos	KO	3 (10)	1959-10-09	Ginásio do Ibirapuera, São Paulo, São Paulo	
29	Win	26–0–3	Ruben Cáceres	KO	7 (10)	1959-07-31	Ginásio do Ibirapuera, São Paulo, São Paulo	
28	Win	25–0–3	Salustiano Suarez	TKO	1 (10)	1959-06-28	Estúdios TV Rio, Rio de Janeiro, Rio de Janeiro	
27	Win	24–0–3	Angel Bustos	TKO	4 (10)	1959-06-19	Ginásio do Ibirapuera, São Paulo, São Paulo	
26	Win	23–0–3	Leo Espinosa	PTS	10	1959-06-04	Ginásio do Ibirapuera, São Paulo, São Paulo	
25	Win	22–0–3	Salustiano Suarez	KO	4 (10)	1959-04-20	Ginásio do Ibirapuera, São Paulo, São Paulo	
24	Win	21–0–3	Aniceto Pereyra	PTS	10	1959-03-23	Ginásio do Ibirapuera, São Paulo, São Paulo	
23	Win	20–0–3	Roberto Castro	KO	2 (10)	1958-12-12	Ginásio do Ibirapuera, São Paulo, São Paulo	
22	Win	19–0–3	Jose Smecca	TKO	7 (10)	1958-11-14	Ginásio do Ibirapuera, São Paulo, São Paulo	
21	Win	18–0–3	Jose Casas	KO	3 (10)	1958-10-10	Ginásio do Ibirapuera, São Paulo, São Paulo	
20	Win	17–0–3	Jose Casas	PTS	10	1958-09-12	Ginásio do Ibirapuera, São Paulo, São Paulo	
19	Win	16–0–3	Roberto Olmedo	TKO	5 (10)	1958-07-18	Ginásio do Ibirapuera, São Paulo, São Paulo	
18	Win	15–0–3	Juan Carlos Acebal	KO	2 (10)	1958-07-18	Ginásio do Ibirapuera, São Paulo, São Paulo	
17	Win	14–0–3	German Escudero	KO	2 (10)	1958-06-29	Estúdios TV Rio, Rio de Janeiro, Rio de Janeiro	
16	Win	13–0–3	German Escudero	KO	2 (10)	1958-06-20	Ginásio do Ibirapuera, São Paulo, São Paulo	
15	Draw	12–0–3	Ruben Cáceres	PTS	10	1958-05-14	Palacio Peñarol, Montevideo	
14	Win	12–0–2	Cristobal Gabisans	TKO	6 (10)	1958-03-07	Ginásio do Ibirapuera, São Paulo, São Paulo	
13	Win	11–0–2	Avelino Romero	TKO	2 (10)	1958-01-29	Ginásio do Ibirapuera, São Paulo, São Paulo	
12	Win	10–0–2	Cristobal Gabisans	PTS	8	1957-12-22	Estúdios TV Rio, Rio de Janeiro, Rio de Janeiro	
11	Win	9–0–2	Adolfo Ramon Pendas	PTS	10	1957-12-13	Ginásio do Ibirapuera, São Paulo, São Paulo	
10	Win	8–0–2	Luis Angel Jimenez	KO	8 (10)	1957-10-30	Ginásio do Ibirapuera, São Paulo, São Paulo	
9	Draw	7–0–2	Ernesto Miranda	PTS	10	1957-09-06	Ginásio do Estádio Pacaembú, São Paulo, São Paulo	
8	Draw	7–0–1	Ernesto Miranda	PTS	10	1957-08-16	Ginásio do Ibirapuera, São Paulo, São Paulo	
7	Win	7–0	Raul Jaime	PTS	10	1957-07-19	Ginásio do Ibirapuera, São Paulo, São Paulo	
6	Win	6–0	Raul Jaime	PTS	10	1957-07-05	São Paulo, São Paulo	
5	Win	5–0	Juan Gonzalez	KO	5 (10)	1957-06-14	Ginásio do Ibirapuera, São Paulo, São Paulo	
4	Win	4–0	Osvaldo Perez	KO	2 (10)	1957-06-07	Ginásio do Ibirapuera, São Paulo, São Paulo	
3	Win	3–0	Osvaldo Perez	TKO	10 (10)	1957-05-24	Ginásio do Ibirapuera, São Paulo, São Paulo	
2	Win	2–0	Raul Lopez	KO	3 (10)	1957-04-26	Ginásio do Ibirapuera, São Paulo, São Paulo	
1	Win	1–0	Raul Lopez	KO	4 (6)	1957-03-29	Estádio Pacaembú, São Paulo, São Paulo	

== Titles in boxing ==
=== Major world titles ===
- NYSAC bantamweight champion (118 lbs)
- NBA (WBA) bantamweight champion (Note: The NBA was renamed the WBA during his reign.) (118 lbs)
- WBC bantamweight champion (Note: Inaugural champion) (118 lbs)
- WBC featherweight champion (126 lbs)

=== The Ring magazine titles ===
- The Ring bantamweight champion (118 lbs)

=== Regional/International titles ===
- South American bantamweight champion (118 lbs)

=== Undisputed titles ===
- Undisputed bantamweight champion

== Honors ==
He was a member of the International Boxing Hall of Fame.

He is listed #16 on "International Boxing Research Organization" all-time pound-for-pound list. In 1983, at the WBC's 20th anniversary, he was voted the greatest bantamweight of all time. He is also rated as the WBA'a all-time "super champion."

He was listed #9 on "Ring Magazine's" 50 greatest boxers of the past 50 years in 1996.

He is listed as #19 on Ring Magazine's list of the 80 Best Fighters of the Last 80 Years.

In 2003, he was listed as #85 on Ring Magazine's list of 100 greatest punchers of all time.

Jofre was ranked as the number 1 bantamweight of all time by the International Boxing Research Organization in 2006.

Éder Jofre is depicted in the 2018 biographical film 10 Segundos Para Vencer. He was portrayed by Brazilian actor Daniel de Oliveira.

In October 2021, he was inducted into the West Coast Boxing Hall of Fame.

== See also ==
- List of world bantamweight boxing champions
- List of world featherweight boxing champions

== Notes and references ==
=== References ===
Sporting positions
Regional boxing titles
Preceded by Ernesto Miranda	South American bantamweight champion 19 February 1960 – November 1960; Vacated	Vacant Title next held by Waldomiro Pinto
World boxing titles
Vacant Title last held by José Becerra	WBA bantamweight champion 18 November 1960 – 18 May 1965 NBA title until 23 August 1962	Succeeded by Fighting Harada
Vacant Title last held by José Becerra	The Ring bantamweight champion 25 March 1961 – 18 May 1965	Succeeded by Fighting Harada
Inaugural champion	WBC bantamweight champion 18 January 1962 – 18 May 1965 NYSAC title until 14 February 1963	Succeeded by Fighting Harada
Vacant Title last held by Jose Becerra	Undisputed bantamweight champion 18 January 1962 – 18 May 1965	Succeeded by Fighting Harada
Preceded by José Legrá	WBC featherweight champion 5 May 1973 – 17 June 1974; Stripped	Vacant Title next held by Bobby Chacon
