= Fighting Harada =

Japanese boxer (born 1943)

Fighting Harada ファイティング原田
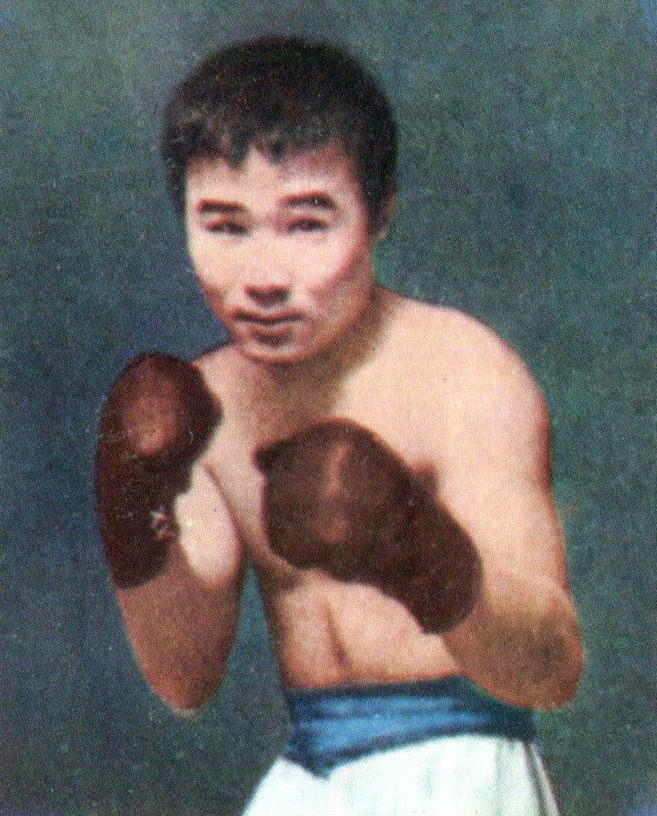

Personal information
- Nickname: Fighting
- Born: Masahiko Harada; April 5, 1943 (age 83) Setagaya, Tokyo, Japan
- Height: 5 ft 3 in (160 cm)
- Weight: Flyweight; Bantamweight; Featherweight

Boxing career
- Reach: 64 in (163 cm)
- Stance: Orthodox

Boxing record
- Total fights: 63
- Wins: 56
- Win by KO: 23
- Losses: 7

Masahiko Harada (born April 5, 1943), better known as Fighting Harada, is a Japanese former professional boxer. He is a world champion in two weight classes, having held the NYSAC, WBA, and The Ring undisputed flyweight titles from 1962 to 1963 and the WBA, WBC, and The Ring undisputed bantamweight titles from 1965 and 1968. He is currently the president of the Japanese boxing association.

Harada was arguably one of Japan's most popular boxers; his fame reached international status, and Puerto Rico's Wilfredo Gómez declared that Harada was his idol as a child. Harada was inducted into the International Boxing Hall of Fame in 1995. In 2002, he was ranked as the 32nd greatest boxer of the past 80 years by Ring magazine.

== Biography ==
Harada began fighting as a professional on February 21, 1960, knocking out Isami Masui in round four, in Tokyo. He won his first twenty four bouts. Among the notables he beat during that span were Ken Morita, who later became a respected boxing official and who was beaten by Harada on June 26 in the first round, and future world champion Hiroyuki Ebihara, who was undefeated in nine fights before meeting Harada and who was beaten by Harada on December 24, by a decision in six rounds.

On June 15, 1962, he suffered his first defeat, being beaten on points by Edmundo Esparza over ten rounds in Tokyo.

After one more win, Harada received his first world title try: on October 10 of that year, he became the Lineal and WBA world flyweight champion by knocking out Pone Kingpetch in the eleventh round, in Tokyo.

A rematch followed, and Harada lost the title in his first defense, being outpointed by Kingpetch over fifteen rounds on January 12, 1963, in Bangkok, Thailand. This was Harada's first fight outside Japan.

Harada posted four more wins in a row before losing by knockout in six to Jose Medel on September 26.

After that loss, Harada posted another winning streak, which reached seven before he was given another world title shot. Among the boxers he beat was top contenders Ray Asis, Oscar Reyes, and Katsutoshi Aoki.

On May 18, 1965, Harada extended his winning streak to eight, when he defeated Lineal, WBA and WBC bantamweight champion Eder Jofre in Nagoya, by a contested fifteen-round decision, to win his second world title. Jofre was undefeated in fifty fights coming into this bout, and considered by many of his fans to be invincible.

On November 30, he defeated perennial British contender Alan Rudkin by a fifteen-round decision to retain the title. On June 1, 1966, he and Jofre had a rematch in Tokyo, and Harada defeated Jofre in another match, by a fifteen-round decision. Losing for the second time to Harada prompted Jofre to retire; he would make a successful comeback three years later. Harada was the only boxer to beat Jofre.

After two more, non-title wins, Harada had a chance to avenge his defeat against Jose Medel. On January 3, 1967, Harada retained his world bantamweight title with a fifteen-round decision over Medel in Nagoya.

On July 4 he retained the title against Colombian Bernardo Caraballo, a fighter who was well liked in his country. Harada outpointed him over fifteen rounds.

On February 27, 1968, Lionel Rose became the first Indigenous Australian to become a world boxing champion, when he outpointed Harada over fifteen rounds in Tokyo. Having lost his world bantamweight crown, Harada then set his sights on regaining it.

He won four of his next five fights. Among those he defeated were American Dwight Hawkins and his countryman Nobuo Chiba. His lone loss during that span came at the hands of American Alton Colter by a ten-round, split decision. Then, he received another world title shot.

On July 28, 1969, after the WBA and WBC had split the world bantamweight title, Harada fought Australia's Johnny Famechon for the WBC world featherweight belt. The fight was held in Sydney, and the referee and only judge was the legendary former world featherweight champion Willie Pep. Pep scored the fight a tie (draw), but Famechon's fans rallied over the call by booing Pep, who then announced he had miscalculated his scorecard and actually had Famechon ahead, making Harada a loser by a fifteen-round decision. This fight was, nevertheless, controversial because of the nature of its ending, and the WBC clamoured for a rematch.

After a knockout win in eight rounds over Pat Gonzalez, the rematch came. Harada's management wanted the fight to be held in Tokyo, and so, on January 6, 1970, Harada and Famechon met once again, this time at Tokyo's Metropolitan Gym. Harada dropped the champion in round ten, but Famechon recovered, knocking Harada off the ring in round fourteen and retaining the title by knockout in that round. This was Harada's last fight as a professional.

Harada led a rather quiet life after retirement. In 1996, he was elected into the International Boxing Hall of Fame in Canastota, New York. Coincidentally, Wilfredo Gómez was inducted in the same ceremony. After Gómez expressed that Harada was his idol, Harada responded, using an interpreter, that Gómez had, in turn, become one of his favorite fighters as well. Eder Jofre, one of the boxers Harada beat to win world titles, is also enshrined at the IBHOF.

Masahiko Harada became president of the Japanese Boxing Commission in 2002.

On January 28, 2004, as he was driving home from his office, Harada experienced a headache and he was found to have a brain hemorrhage which required hospitalisation. By 2005 he was recovering steadily.

On November 7, 2019, he presented the Muhammad Ali Trophy to Naoya Inoue after his victory over Nonito Donaire to win the 2018–19 World Boxing Super Series – bantamweight division tournament.

== Professional boxing record ==
63 fights	56 wins	7 losses
By knockout	23	2
By decision	33	5

No.	Result	Record	Opponent	Type	Round, time	Date	Location	Notes
63	Loss	56–7	Johnny Famechon	KO	14 (15), 1:09	1970-01-06	Metropolitan Gymnasium, Tokyo, Japan	For WBC featherweight title
62	Win	56–6	Pat Gonzales	KO	8 (10), 0:17	1969-10-01	Fukui, Fukui, Japan	
61	Loss	55–6	Johnny Famechon	PTS	15	1969-07-28	Sydney Stadium, Sydney, Australia	For WBC featherweight title
60	Win	55–5	Vil Tumulak	UD	10	1969-06-04	Nagoya, Aichi, Japan	
59	Loss	54–5	Alton Colter	SD	10	1969-04-02	Tokyo, Japan	
58	Win	54–4	Roy Amolong	KO	2 (10), 1:55	1968-12-04	Tokyo, Japan	
57	Win	53–4	Nobuo Chiba	KO	7 (10), 1:13	1968-09-04	Sano, Tochigi, Japan	
56	Win	52–4	Dwight Hawkins	UD	10	1968-06-05	Tokyo, Japan	
55	Loss	51–4	Lionel Rose	UD	15	1968-02-27	Nippon Budokan, Tokyo, Japan	Lost WBA, WBC, and The Ring bantamweight titles
54	Win	51–3	Soo Bok Kwon	KO	8 (12), 0:26	1967-11-28	Okayama City, Okayama, Japan	
53	Win	50–3	Hajime Taroura	KO	2 (12), 1:52	1967-09-25	Osaka, Osaka, Japan	
52	Win	49–3	Bernardo Caraballo	UD	15	1967-07-04	Nippon Budokan, Tokyo, Japan	Retained WBA, WBC, and The Ring bantamweight titles
51	Win	48–3	Tiny Palacio	UD	12	1967-04-04	Fukuoka, Fukuoka, Japan	
50	Win	47–3	José Medel	UD	15	1967-01-03	Aichi Prefectural Gymnasium, Nagoya, Aichi, Japan	Retained WBA, WBC, and The Ring bantamweight titles
49	Win	46–3	Antonio Herrera	UD	12	1966-10-25	Osaka, Osaka, Japan	
48	Win	45–3	Dio Espinosa	UD	10	1966-08-01	Sapporo, Hokkaido, Japan	
47	Win	44–3	Éder Jofre	UD	15	1966-05-31	Nippon Budokan, Tokyo, Japan	Retained WBA, WBC, and The Ring bantamweight titles
46	Win	43–3	Soo Kang Suh	PTS	12	1966-02-15	Nagoya, Aichi, Japan	
45	Win	42–3	Alan Rudkin	UD	15	1965-11-30	Nippon Budokan, Tokyo, Japan	Retained WBA, WBC, and The Ring bantamweight titles
44	Win	41–3	Katsuo Saito	PTS	12	1965-07-28	Tokyo, Japan	
43	Win	40–3	Éder Jofre	SD	15	1965-05-18	Aichi Prefectural Gymnasium, Nagoya, Aichi, Japan	Won WBA, WBC, and The Ring bantamweight titles
42	Win	39–3	Toru Nakamura	KO	2	1965-03-04		
41	Win	38–3	Dommy Froilan	KO	6 (10), 1:20	1965-01-04	Tokyo, Japan	
40	Win	37–3	Katsutoshi Aoki	KO	3 (10), 2:54	1964-10-29	Tokyo, Japan	
39	Win	36–3	Oscar Reyes	PTS	10	1964-09-17	Tokyo, Japan	
38	Win	35–3	Ray Asis	UD	10	1964-07-06	Sports Arena, Los Angeles, California, U.S.	
37	Win	34–3	Somsak Laemfapha	KO	2 (10), 1:05	1964-02-14	Osaka, Osaka, Japan	
36	Win	33–3	Avelino Estrada	KO	5 (10), 0:51	1964-01-02	Tokyo, Japan	
35	Win	32–3	Emile de Leon	PTS	10	1963-11-25	Tokyo, Japan	
34	Loss	31–3	José Medel	TKO	6 (10), 2:28	1963-09-26	Tokyo, Japan	
33	Win	31–2	Dommy Balajada	UD	10	1963-08-07	Tokyo, Japan	
32	Win	30–2	Thira Lodjarengabe	RTD	6 (10), 3:00	1963-06-19	Nagoya, Aichi, Japan	
31	Win	29–2	Jose Cejuda	KO	1 (10), 0:28	1963-05-04	Naha, Okinawa, Japan	
30	Win	28–2	Tetsuro Kawai	UD	10	1963-03-21	Tokyo, Japan	
29	Loss	27–2	Pone Kingpetch	MD	15	1963-01-12	National Stadium Gymnasium, Bangkok, Thailand	Lost NYSAC, WBA and The Ring flyweight titles
28	Win	27–1	Pone Kingpetch	KO	11 (15), 2:50	1962-10-10	Kokugikan, Tokyo, Japan	Won NYSAC, WBA, and The Ring flyweight titles
27	Win	26–1	Little Rufe	UD	10	1962-07-23	Tokyo, Japan	
26	Loss	25–1	Edmundo Esparza	SD	10	1962-06-14	Tokyo, Japan	
25	Win	25–0	Baby Espinosa	PTS	10	1962-05-03	Korakuen Gym, Tokyo, Japan	
24	Win	24–0	Tadao Kawamura	UD	10	1962-03-18	Tokyo, Japan	
23	Win	23–0	Kozo Nagata	UD	10	1962-01-12	Tokyo, Japan	
22	Win	22–0	Ryoji Shiratori	KO	6 (8), 1:12	1961-12-10	Nagoya, Aichi, Japan	
21	Win	21–0	Akio Maki	UD	10	1961-10-09	Osaka, Osaka, Japan	
20	Win	20–0	Sombang Banbung	KO	3 (10), 2:37	1961-09-09	Tokyo, Japan	
19	Win	19–0	Akio Maki	RTD	8 (10), 3:00	1961-07-31	Tokyo, Japan	
18	Win	18–0	Shigeru Ito	UD	10	1961-06-19	Tokyo, Japan	
17	Win	17–0	Ray Perez	UD	10	1961-05-01	Tokyo, Japan	
16	Win	16–0	Yasuo Fujita	UD	6	1961-03-05	Tokyo, Japan	
15	Win	15–0	Riichi Tanaka	UD	6	1961-01-28	Tokyo, Japan	
14	Win	14–0	Tsuyoshi Nakamura	UD	6	1961-01-05	Tokyo, Japan	
13	Win	13–0	Hiroyuki Ebihara	PTS	6	1960-12-24	Tokyo, Japan	
12	Win	12–0	Yoshinori Hikita	KO	3 (4), 1:44	1960-12-11	Tokyo, Japan	
11	Win	11–0	Hachiro Arai	UD	4	1960-11-07	Tokyo, Japan	
10	Win	10–0	Sadayoshi Yoshida	KO	4 (4), 1:02	1960-10-28	Tokyo, Japan	
9	Win	9–0	Yukio Suzuki	UD	4	1960-09-01	Tokyo, Japan	
8	Win	8–0	Masaru Kodangi	RTD	3 (4), 3:00	1960-07-18	Tokyo, Japan	
7	Win	7–0	Kazuo Morita	KO	1 (4), 1:25	1960-06-24	Shinagawa Hall, Tokyo, Japan	
6	Win	6–0	Masatake Ogura	TKO	3 (4), 2:16	1960-06-10	Tokyo, Japan	
5	Win	5–0	Ken Morita	UD	4	1960-04-13	Tokyo, Japan	
4	Win	4–0	Yuichi Noguchi	UD	4	1960-04-04	Tokyo, Japan	
3	Win	3–0	Goro Iwamoto	KO	3 (4), 2:53	1960-03-27	Asakusa Hall, Tokyo, Japan	
2	Win	2–0	Mitsuo Motohashi	SD	4	1960-03-02	Tokyo, Japan	
1	Win	1–0	Isami Masui	TKO	4 (4), 2:20	1960-02-21	Tokyo, Japan	

== Titles in boxing ==
=== Major world titles ===
- NYSAC flyweight champion (112 lbs)
- WBA flyweight champion (112 lbs)
- WBA bantamweight champion (118 lbs)
- WBC bantamweight champion (118 lbs)

=== The Ring magazine titles ===
- The Ring flyweight champion (112 lbs)
- The Ring bantamweight champion (118 lbs)

=== Undisputed titles ===
- Undisputed flyweight champion
- Undisputed bantamweight champion

== See also ==
- List of flyweight boxing champions
- List of bantamweight boxing champions
- List of Japanese boxing world champions
- Boxing in Japan

Sporting positions
World boxing titles
Preceded by Pone Kingpetch	NYSAC flyweight champion October 10, 1962 – January 12, 1963	Succeeded by Pone Kingpetch
Preceded by Pone Kingpetch	WBA flyweight champion October 10, 1962 – January 12, 1963	Succeeded by Pone Kingpetch
Preceded by Pone Kingpetch	The Ring flyweight champion October 10, 1962 – January 12, 1963	Succeeded by Pone Kingpetch
Preceded by Pone Kingpetch	Undisputed flyweight champion October 10, 1962 – January 12, 1963	Succeeded by Pone Kingpetch
Preceded by Éder Jofre	WBA bantamweight champion May 18, 1965 – February 27, 1968	Succeeded by Lionel Rose
Preceded by Éder Jofre	WBC bantamweight champion May 18, 1965 – February 27, 1968	Succeeded by Lionel Rose
Preceded by Éder Jofre	The Ring bantamweight champion May 18, 1965 – February 27, 1968	Succeeded by Lionel Rose
Preceded by Éder Jofre	Undisputed bantamweight champion May 18, 1965 – February 27, 1968	Succeeded by Lionel Rose
