= Wilfredo Vázquez Jr. =

Puerto Rican boxer

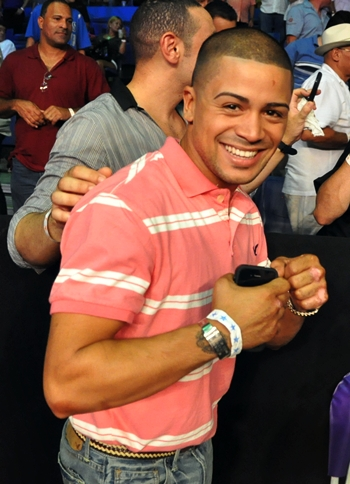
- Vázquez Jr. in 2011

Personal information
- Nicknames: Papito; WV2
- Nationality: Puerto Rican
- Born: June 18, 1984 (age 42) Bayamón, Puerto Rico
- Height: 5 ft 5 1/2 in (166 cm)
- Weight: Super bantamweight; Featherweight

Boxing career
- Reach: 66 in (168 cm)
- Stance: Orthodox

Boxing record
- Total fights: 34
- Wins: 26
- Win by KO: 20
- Losses: 7
- Draws: 1

Wilfredo Vázquez Jr. (born June 18, 1984) is a Puerto Rican former professional boxer who competed from 2006 to 2016, and held the WBO junior featherweight title from 2010 to 2011. He is the son of former world champion Wilfredo Vázquez.

== Professional career ==
Vázquez Jr. debuted as a professional in an event that took place on December 18, 2006 in Kissimmee, Florida. In this event he fought against Octavius Davis who was also debuting as a professional, Vázquez won the fight by knockout in the first round. His second professional fight was on February 2, 2007, against Daniel Lornezano in a boxing card presented in Miami, Florida. Vázquez won three more fights by knockout over the course of the first half of 2007, against Danny Esquivel, Cature Hicks Juan Camacho and Jaime Villa, on cards that took place in Kissimmee and Miami. Vázquez participated in his first fight outside Florida on August 25, 2007, in a card that took place in Bayamón, Puerto Rico. In this event, he defeated Anthony Chacon via knockout on the first round. On September 14, 2007 Wilfredo participated in a fight scheduled for six rounds for the first time in his career, he won the fight by technical knockout in the third round. On December 15, 2007, Vázquez fought Jorge Cardenas in Cancún, Mexico. The judges scored the fight as a draw, marking the first instance that he did not win in his professional career. His return to the ring was on March 28, 2008, when he fought against Corey Goodwin, winning the contest by knockout in the third round. Two months later, he defeated Moises Carrasquillo by knockout. On July 26, 2008, Vázquez defeated Felipe Almanza by disqualification. The result was determined after Almanza tried to kick Vázquez after the fourth round had concluded. His first title opportunity took place on September 12, 2008, when he fought Adolfo Landeros for the vacant WBO Latino Super Bantamweight Championship. Vázquez won the regional championship by technical knockout in the eighth round.

He returned to action on November 21, 2008, being paired against Victor Martínez in a fight for his championship and the vacant WBA Fedecentro title. Vázquez opened the fight in a slow pace, utilizing the first round as a stage to study his opponent. After the second round, Vázquez began executing the offensive more fluidly, using jabs and counterattacks to his advantage. During the second half, he continued pressuring the offensive, scoring solid combinations in the seventh stanza. Martínez improved in the ninth and tenth round, being more effective on his attack. In the following stage, Vázquez regained control of the offensive’s tempo, scoring a knockdown. This pace continued in the final round, with Martínez receiving combinations. Following one of these attacks, Vázquez connected a left hook that made Martínez fell to the canvas, unable to continue before the referee counted ten, leading to a knockout.

On March 13, 2009, Vázquez returned to action, defending the WBA Fedecentro Championship against José Ángel Beranza. Early in the fight, both pugilists exchanged punches, before Vázquez was able to employ a calm pace which favored him. Early in the third round, Beranza displayed a better offensive, but lost control of the fight’s tempo later in that round. Vázquez began the fourth round on the offensive, with this pace continuing throughout the chapter. After receiving a warning for "roughhousing" in the fifth, Beranza was unable to respond effectively during the sixth and seventh. Using this to his advantage, Vázquez pressured the offensive and established control of the fight’s tempo. Beranza was eventually deducted a point for using illegal tactics. After the twelfth round, the fight's outcome was decided by the judges, who gave scores of 118-109, 119-108 and 120-106 in favor of Vázquez. On July 17, 2009, he fought Cecilio Santos, winning by knockout in the second round. On November 20, 2009, Vázquez defended the regional title against Genaro García in a world championship eliminatory. He dominated the early stages by using jabs and moving, but García was able to pressure the fight as the rounds advanced. In the seventh round, both pugilists exchanged combinations, but Vazquez was able to score a knockdown and continued on the offensive. Consequently, the referee stopped the fight by technical knockout.

=== WBO super bantamweight champion and establishing world records ===
Vázquez's first world championship fight was scheduled for February 27, 2010, in Bayamón's Rubén Rodríguez Coliseum. His opponent was former WBO Super Flyweight titlist, Marvin Sonsona, with the WBO Super Bantamweight World Championship left vacant by Juan Manuel López being in play. The card was named Haciendo Historia (lit. "Making History") because Vázquez had an opportunity to establish several records, while Sonsona could become the youngest two-division champion in history. The first round was slow, with both boxers using it to study their opponent's tactic, Sonsona was slightly aggressive, winning the round. In the following chapter, Sonsona used straight left punches, while Vázquez injured him with a series of right punches. This pattern continued in the third, when he pinned Sonsona to the ropes and focused his offensive to the body, also bruising his opponent's left cheek. Despite being on the defensive, Sonsona was able to counter with an uppercut once. The fourth round began with Vázquez pressuring the offensive, while his opponent kept his back to the ropes intending to counter. However, Sonsona was unable to successfully connect, while throwing uppercuts. Vázquez continued on the offensive, connecting a combination to the head and liver that injured his opponent, who was unable to recover before the referee's protective count concluded. With this knockout victory, he established several boxing records, such as becoming the first fighter to win a world title without participating in a single amateur contest. The pugilist joined his father as the third father-and-son combination to win world championships, the first to do so in the same division and the first son trained by a tri-champion father to win a title. Incidentally, he also became the first boxer to win a world title, while being promoted by the son of the man that promoted his father's successful championship contests.

Vázquez's first title defense was against mandatory challenger, Zsolt Bedák. Both boxers exchanged punch combinations throughout the first six rounds. By the seventh, Bedák began showing signs of exhaustion, which tilted the fight against him. Consequently, Vázquez gained complete control of offensive, eventually scoring a knockdown in the tenth round. Bedák was able to recover before the referee's protective count concluded, but his corner submitted the fight afterwards.

== Personal life ==
Vázquez is married to Jacqueline Román, with whom he has two children, Lya M. Vázquez Román and Liaris C. Vázquez Román Initially, he began studies in law, but abandoned them in favor of boxing. Although his father, Wilfredo Vázquez, held world titles in three different divisions, he had not been interested in pursuing a professional career until this point, only entering the sport to provide income for his family. Consequently, he began training under his father when he was 21 years old, learning the basics without any amateur experience. During this timeframe, he experienced complications that made him consider leaving the sport and pursuing employment in other fields.

== Professional boxing record ==
34 fights	26 wins	7 losses
By knockout	20	2
By decision	5	5
By disqualification	1	0
Draws	1	

No.	Result	Record	Opponent	Type	Round, time	Date	Location	Notes
34	Win	26–7–1	Dunis Linan	UD	6	May 15, 2021	Hotel Villa Real, Ciudad Acuña, Mexico	
33	Win	25–7–1	Cristian Mijares	KO	3 (10)	Jun 16, 2018	Auditorio Centenario, Gómez Palacio, Mexico	
32	Loss	24–7–1	Juan Manuel López	TKO	11 (12), 2:29	Oct 29, 2016	Roberto Clemente Coliseum, San Juan, Puerto Rico	
31	Loss	24–6–1	Rafael Rivera	SD	10	Dec 5, 2015	Osceola Heritage Park, Kissimmee, Florida, U.S.	For vacant WBC FECARBOX featherweight title
30	Loss	24–5–1	Fernando Vargas	UD	8	Jun 6, 2015	Barclays Center, New York City, New York, US	
29	Win	24–4–1	Jonathan Arrellano	MD	8	Nov 1, 2014	Coliseo Héctor Solá Bezares, Caguas, Puerto Rico	Won vacant WBC–USNBC featherweight title
28	Loss	23–4–1	Marvin Sonsona	SD	10	Jun 7, 2014	Madison Square Garden, New York City, New York, U.S.	For vacant WBC-NABF featherweight title
27	Win	23–3–1	Guillermo Avila	UD	12	Sep 20, 2013	Civic Center, Kissimmee, Florida, U.S.	Won vacant WBO International super bantamweight title
26	Loss	22–3–1	Yasutaka Ishimoto	MD	10	Apr 6, 2013	Cotai Arena, Macau, SAR	Lost WBO International super bantamweight title
25	Win	22–2–1	Jonathan Oquendo	TKO	7 (12), 2:33	Oct 6, 2012	Coliseo Rubén Rodríguez, Bayamón, Puerto Rico	Won vacant WBO International super bantamweight title
24	Loss	21–2–1	Nonito Donaire	SD	12	Feb 4, 2012	Alamodome, San Antonio, Texas, U.S.	For vacant WBO super bantamweight title
23	Win	21–1–1	Roberto Carlos Leyva	KO	3 (10), 2:59	Oct 29, 2011	Mario Morales Coliseum, Guaynabo, Puerto Rico	
22	Loss	20–1–1	Jorge Arce	TKO	12 (12), 0:55	May 7, 2011	MGM Grand Garden Arena, Paradise, Nevada, U.S.	Lost WBO super bantamweight title
21	Win	20–0–1	Iván Hernández	TKO	11 (12), 0:50	Oct 16, 2010	Silver Spurs Arena, Kissimmee, Florida, U.S.	Retained WBO super bantamweight title
20	Win	19–0–1	Zsolt Bedák	TKO	10 (12), 1:12	May 29, 2010	Coliseo Rubén Rodríguez, Bayamón, Puerto Rico	Retained WBO super bantamweight title
19	Win	18–0–1	Marvin Sonsona	KO	4 (12), 2:01	Feb 27, 2010	Coliseo Rubén Rodríguez, Bayamón, Puerto Rico	Won vacant WBO super bantamweight title
18	Win	17–0–1	Genaro García	TKO	7 (12), 2:49	Nov 20, 2009	Civic Center, Kissimmee, Florida, U.S.	Retained WBO Latino interim super bantamweight title
17	Win	16–0–1	Cecilio Santos	KO	2 (12), 2:59	Jul 17, 2009	Civic Center, Kissimmee, Florida, U.S.	Retained WBO Latino interim super bantamweight title
16	Win	15–0–1	Jose Angel Beranza	UD	12	Mar 13, 2009	Civic Center, Kissimmee, Florida, U.S.	Retained WBO Latino interim super bantamweight title; Won vacant WBA Fedecentro super bantamweight title
15	Win	14–0–1	Victor Martinez	KO	12 (12), 0:29	Nov 21, 2008	Civic Center, Kissimmee, Florida, U.S.	
14	Win	13–0–1	Adolfo Landeros	TKO	8 (12), 0:45	Sep 12, 2008	Civic Center, Kissimmee, Florida, U.S.	Won vacant WBO Latino interim super bantamweight title
13	Win	12–0–1	Felipe Almanza	DQ	4 (6), 3:00	Jul 25, 2008	Civic Center, Kissimmee, Florida, U.S.	Almanza disqualified for kicking after the bell
12	Win	11–0–1	Moises Carrasquillo	KO	2 (4), 1:33	May 16, 2008	Civic Center, Kissimmee, Florida, U.S.	
11	Win	10–0–1	Corey Goodwin	KO	3 (6), 1:18	Mar 28, 2008	Civic Center, Kissimmee, Florida, U.S.	
10	Draw	9–0–1	Jorge Cardenas	MD	8	Dec 15, 2007	Plaza de Toros, Cancún, Mexico	
9	Win	9–0	Corey Goodwin	TKO	2 (6), 2:02	Nov 16, 2007	Civic Center, Kissimmee, Florida, U.S.	
8	Win	8–0	Benjamin Orozco	TKO	3 (6), 0:46	Sep 14, 2007	Civic Center, Kissimmee, Florida, U.S.	
7	Win	7–0	Anthony Chacon	KO	1 (4), 2:46	Aug 25, 2007	Coliseo Rubén Rodríguez, Bayamón, Puerto Rico	
6	Win	6–0	Jaime Villa	KO	3 (4), 1:03	Jul 20, 2007	Civic Center, Kissimmee, Florida, U.S.	
5	Win	5–0	Cature Hicks	TKO	1 (4), 2:45	Jun 1, 2007	Miccosukee Resort & Gaming, Miami, Florida, U.S.	
4	Win	4–0	Juan Camacho	TKO	1 (4), 2:35	Apr 20, 2007	Miccosukee Resort & Gaming, Miami, Florida, U.S.	
3	Win	3–0	Danny Esquivel	TKO	3 (4), 0:45	Mar 23, 2007	Civic Center, Kissimmee, Florida, U.S.	
2	Win	2–0	Daniel Lorenzana	UD	4	Feb 23, 2007	Miccosukee Resort & Gaming, Miami, Florida, U.S.	
1	Win	1–0	Octavius Davis	KO	1 (4)	Dec 8, 2006	Civic Center, Kissimmee, Florida, U.S.	

== See also ==
- List of Puerto Rican boxing world champions
- List of boxing families § Puerto Rico

Sporting positions
Regional boxing titles
Vacant Title last held by Alex de Oliveira	WBO Latino super bantamweight champion Interim title September 12, 2008 – February 27, 2010; Won world title	Vacant Title next held by Kiko Martínez
Vacant Title last held by Feider Viloria	WBA Fedecentro super bantamweight champion March 13, 2009 – July 2009; Vacated	Vacant Title next held by Jesus M Rojas
New title	WBO International super bantamweight champion October 6, 2012 – April 6, 2013	Succeeded by Yasutaka Ishimoto
Vacant Title last held by Yasutaka Ishimoto	WBO International super bantamweight champion September 20, 2013 – June 2014; Vacated	Vacant Title next held by Cesar Juarez
Vacant Title last held by Romulo Koasicha	WBC–USNBC featherweight champion November 1, 2014 – June 2015; Vacated	Vacant Title next held by Ronell Green
World boxing titles
Vacant Title last held by Juan Manuel López	WBO super bantamweight champion February 27, 2010 – May 7, 2011	Succeeded by Jorge Arce
