= Adonis Rivas =

Nicaraguan boxer

Personal information
- Nickname: Caballo ("Horse")
- Born: Adonis Antonio Rivas Ordóñez; 7 December 1972 (age 53) León, Nicaragua
- Weight: Flyweight; Super flyweight; Bantamweight

Boxing career
- Stance: Orthodox

Boxing record
- Total fights: 43
- Wins: 22
- Win by KO: 10
- Losses: 15
- Draws: 4
- No contests: 2

Adonis Antonio Rivas Ordóñez (born 7 December 1972) is a Nicaraguan former professional boxer who competed between 1995 and 2014. He is a world champion in two weight classes, having held the WBO super flyweight title from 1999 to 2001 and the WBO flyweight title in 2002.

== Professional career ==
Rivas turned professional in 1995 and captured the WBO super flyweight title with a decision win over Diego Morales in 1999. He defended the belt twice before losing it to Pedro Alcázar in 2001. He dropped down in weight in 2002 to fight for the WBO flyweight title against Jair Jimenez and won a majority decision. He lost the belt later that year to Omar Andres Narvaez. In 2005 and 2006 he lost a pair of bouts against Jorge Arce for the WBC flyweight title.

== Professional boxing record ==
43 fights	22 wins	15 losses
By knockout	10	4
By decision	12	11
Draws	4	
No contests	2	

No.	Result	Record	Opponent	Type	Round	Date	Location	Notes
43	Loss	21–15–3 (2)	Johnson Tellez	UD	6	15 Feb 2014	Puerto Salvador Allende, Managua, Nicaragua	
42	NC	21–14–3 (2)	Edwin Calixto	NC	2 (8), 1:51	22 Jun 2013	Cancha Municipal de Nagarote, Leon, Nicaragua	
41	Loss	21–14–3 (1)	Rafael Castillo	UD	8	16 Mar 2013	Plaza Los Cabros, Ciudad Sandino, Nicaragua	
40	Draw	21–13–4 (1)	Elvis Guillen	PTS	8	25 Jun 2011	Gimnasio Alexis Arguello, Managua, Nicaragua	
39	Loss	21–13–2 (1)	Ivan Pozo	UD	12	4 Mar 2011	O Porriño, Galicia, Spain	
38	Draw	21–12–3 (1)	Elvis Guillen	MD	6	6 Nov 2010	Casino La Perla, Leon, Nicaragua	
37	Loss	21–12–1 (1)	René Alvarado	UD	8	12 Mar 2010	Gimnasio, Alexis Arguello, Managua, Nicaragua	
36	Loss	21–11–1 (1)	Alvaro Perez	UD	10	23 Feb 2007	Crowne Plaza, Managua, Nicaragua	
35	Loss	21–10–1 (1)	Alejandro Valdez	UD	10	19 Aug 2006	Centro de Espectaculos Modelo, Ciudad Obregon, Mexico	
34	Win	21–9–1 (1)	Alberto Mitre	UD	10	27 May 2006	Gimnasio Universidad de Managua, Managua, Nicaragua	Won vacant WBA Fedecaribe bantamweight title
33	Loss	21–9–1 (1)	Jorge Arce	RTD	6 (12), 3:00	28 Jan 2006	Plaza de Toros, Cancún, Quintana Roo, Mexico	For WBC flyweight title
32	Loss	21–8–2 (1)	Jorge Arce	TKO	10 (12), 1:20	16 Dec 2005	Arena Monterrey, Monterrey, Mexico	For WBC interim flyweight title
31	Draw	21–7–2 (1)	Leopoldo Arrocha	MD	10	2 Sep 2005	Casino Las Vegas, Managua, Nicaragua	
30	Loss	21–7–1 (1)	Jhonny González	UD	12	17 Feb 2005	The Avalon, Hollywood, California, U.S.	For WBC Continental Americas bantamweight title
29	Win	21–6–1 (1)	David Arosemena	UD	12	30 Dec 2004	Esso-Rubenia Parqueo, Managua, Nicaragua	
28	Win	20–6–1 (1)	Erik Perez	UD	12	30 Oct 2004	Holiday Inn Hotel, Managua, Nicaragua	
27	Loss	19–6–1 (1)	Genaro García	TKO	8 (12)	22 May 2004	Plaza de Toros, Mexico City, Distrito Federal, Mexico	For WBC FECARBOX bantamweight title
26	Loss	19–5–1 (1)	Diego Morales	UD	12	27 Mar 2004	Auditorio Municipal, Tijuana, Baja California, Mexico	
25	Loss	19–4–1 (1)	José Navarro	UD	12	21 Aug 2003	HP Pavilion, San Jose, California, U.S.	For vacant WBC Continental Americas super flyweight title
24	Loss	19–3–1 (1)	Omar Naráez	UD	12	13 Jul 2002	Estadio Luna Park, Buenos Aires, Argentina	Lost WBO flyweight title
23	Win	19–2–1 (1)	Jair Jimenez	MD	12	15 Dec 2001	Estadio Nacional, Managua, Nicaragua	Won WBO interim flyweight title
22	Win	18–2–1 (1)	Javier Medina	RTD	4 (12), 3:00	15 Dec 2000	Polideportivo Espania, Managua, Nicaragua	Won WBO Latino flyweight title
21	Loss	17–2–1 (1)	Pedro Alcázar	SD	12	16 Jun 2001	Gimnasio Nueva Panama, Juan Diaz, Panama	Lost WBO super flyweight title
20	Win	17–1–1 (1)	Joel Luna Zarate	UD	12	2 Sep 2000	Estadio Nacional, Managua, Nicaragua	Retained WBO super flyweight title
19	Win	16–1–1 (1)	Pedro Morquecho	TD	11 (12)	25 Mar 2000	Estadio National, Maragua, Nicaragua	Retained WBO super flyweight title
18	Win	15–1–1 (1)	Diego Morales	UD	12	20 Nov 1999	Hardrock Hotel and Casino, Las Vegas, Nevada, U.S.	Won WBO super flyweight title
17	Win	14–1–1 (1)	Antonio Jaramillo	TKO	10 (10)	24 Jul 1999	San Jose, Costa Rica	
16	Win	13–1–1 (1)	Ovidio Mojica	KO	1 (8)	26 Jun 1999	Managua, Nicaragua	
15	Win	12–1–1 (1)	Roberto Bonilla	KO	9 (10)	12 Feb 1999	Managua, Nicaragua	
14	Win	11–1–1 (1)	Antonio Gonzalez	UD	10	2 May 1998	Gimnasio Alexis Arguello, Managua, Nicaragua	
13	NC	10–1–1 (1)	Carlos Lazo	NC	2 (10)	6 Jan 1998	Leon, Nicaragua	
12	Win	10–1–1	Jorge Luis Rocha	PTS	10	15 Aug 1997	Managua, Nicaragua	
11	Draw	10–1–1	Antonio Gonzalez	PTS	8	5 Jul 1997	Managua, Nicaragua	
10	Loss	9–1	Sergio Gonzalez	TKO	4 (8)	15 Mar 1997	Leon, Nicaragua	
9	Win	9–0	Carlos Castrillo	PTS	10	14 Dec 1996	Leon, Nicaragua	
8	Win	8–0	Carlos Lazo	KO	10 (10)	3 Aug 1996	Managua, Nicaragua	
7	Win	7–0	Ramon Bustamante	KO	5 (10)	29 Jun 1996	Leon, Nicaragua	
6	Win	6–0	Edwin Vargas	TKO	5 (10)	15 Jun 1996	Leon, Nicaragua	
5	Win	5–0	Martin Ruiz	KO	2 (6)	4 May 1996	Tijuana, Baja California, Mexico	
4	Win	4–0	Francisco Cortez	PTS	8	14 Mar 1996	Leon, Nicaragua	
3	Win	3–0	Marvin Solis	KO	4 (10)	17 Feb 1996	Managua, Nicaragua	
2	Win	2–0	Jorge Luis Rocha	PTS	6	11 Nov 1995	Leon, Nicaragua	
1	Win	1–0	Edwin Varas	TKO	3 (10)	21 Oct 1995	Leon, Nicaragua	

== Titles in boxing ==
=== Major world titles ===
- WBO flyweight champion (112 lbs)
- WBO super flyweight champion (115 lbs)

=== Interim world titles ===
- WBO interim flyweight champion (112 lbs)

=== Regional/International titles ===
- WBO Latino flyweight champion (112 lbs)
- WBA Fedacaribe bantamweight champion (118 lbs)

Sporting positions
World boxing titles
Preceded by Diego Morales	WBO super flyweight champion 20 November 1999 – 16 June 2001	Succeeded by Pedro Alcázar
New title	WBO flyweight champion Interim title 4 May 2002 – 22 June 2002; Promoted	Vacant
Vacant Title last held by Fernando Montiel	WBO flyweight champion 22 June 2002 – 13 July 2002	Succeeded by Omar Narváez
