= Pedro Alcázar =

Panamanian boxer (1975–2002)

Personal information
- Nickname: El Rockero
- Born: Guillermo Gonzalez; 16 September 1975 Zapallal, Panama
- Died: 24 June 2002 (aged 26) Las Vegas Valley, Nevada, U.S.
- Height: 5 ft 4 in (163 cm)
- Weight: Super flyweight

Boxing career
- Stance: Orthodox

Boxing record
- Total fights: 28
- Wins: 25
- Win by KO: 14
- Losses: 1
- Draws: 1
- No contests: 1

Guillermo Gonzalez, better known as Pedro "El Rockero" Alcázar (16 September 1975 in Zapayal, Panama – 24 June 2002) was a Panamanian boxer who won the WBO Super flyweight championship, and then sustained fatal injuries in the ring.

== Professional career ==
Alcázar turned professional in 1995 & compiled a record of 22–0–1 (1 NC) before beating Adonis Rivas, to win the WBO super-flyweight title. He lost his title to Fernando Montiel in Las Vegas, Nevada on 22 June 2002, in what would turn out to be his final bout.

== Professional boxing record ==
28 fights	25 wins	1 loss
By knockout	14	1
By decision	11	0
Draws	1	
No contests	1	

No.	Result	Record	Opponent	Type	Round, time	Date	Location	Notes
28	Loss	25–1–1 (1)	Fernando Montiel	TKO	6 (12)	2002-06-22	MGM Grand Garden Arena, Paradise, Nevada, U.S.	Lost WBO super-flyweight title; Alcazar passes away two days later
27	Win	25–0–1 (1)	Alfredo Toro	TKO	4 (10)	2002-04-19	Arena Panama Al Brown, Colón, Panama	
26	Win	24–0–1 (1)	Jorge Otero	UD	12 (12)	2001-10-05	Gimnasio Nuevo Panama, Panama City, Panama	Retained WBO super-flyweight title
25	Win	23–0–1 (1)	Adonis Rivas	SD	12 (12)	2001-06-16	Gimnasio Nuevo Panama, Panama City, Panama	Won WBO super-flyweight title
24	Win	22–0–1 (1)	Alex Saavedra	KO	4 (8)	2001-04-27	Salón Magnum Eventus, Panama City, Panama	
23	Win	21–0–1 (1)	Sergio Pérez	UD	12 (12)	2001-02-03	Gimnasio Nuevo Panama, Panama City, Panama	Won vacant WBO Latino super-flyweight title
22	Win	20–0–1 (1)	Jose Morales	KO	3 (10)	2000-10-28	Gimnasio Yuyin Luzcando, Panama City, Panama	
21	Draw	19–0–1 (1)	Ramon Estrada	PTS	10 (10)	2000-08-31	Hotel Melia Cariari, San Antonio, Costa Rica	
20	Win	19–0 (1)	Cristian Morales	TKO	8 (?)	2000-06-03	Hotel Melia Cariari, San Antonio, Costa Rica	
19	Win	18–0 (1)	Marcos Sanchez	MD	12 (12)	1999-11-17	Hotel El Panamá, Panama City, Panama	Won vacant WBA Fedelatin super-flyweight title
18	Win	17–0 (1)	Wilmer Jinete	UD	10 (10)	1999-09-04	Balboa Civic Center, Panama City, Panama	
17	Win	16–0 (1)	Jose Plinio Gonzalez	TKO	3 (10)	1999-01-30	Arena Panama Al Brown, Colón, Panama	
16	Win	15–0 (1)	Alex Saavedra	TKO	10 (12)	1998-05-16	Arena Panama Al Brown, Colón, Panama	Won vacant WBO Inter-Continental super-flyweight title
15	Win	14–0 (1)	Leon Salazar	TKO	7 (10)	1998-01-31	Gimnasio Nuevo Panama, Panama City, Panama	
14	NC	13–0 (1)	Edgar Monserrat	NC	10 (10)	1997-11-15	Gimnasio Nuevo Panama, Panama City, Panama	Originally a MD win for Monserrat; later ruled an NC after he failed a drug test
13	Win	13–0	Danilo Arciria	UD	8 (8)	1997-10-04	Gimnasio Chino-Panameno, Panama City, Panama	
12	Win	12–0	Virgilio Chifundo	UD	10 (10)	1997-06-14	Gimnasio Nuevo Panama, Panama City, Panama	
11	Win	11–0	Benedicto Murillo	UD	10 (10)	1996-10-11	Hipodromo Presidente Remon, Panama City, Panama	
10	Win	10–0	Rodolfo Agrazal	KO	1 (8)	1996-08-31	Gimnasio Nuevo Panama, Panama City, Panama	
9	Win	9–0	Garibaldo Morris	TKO	1 (8)	1996-08-24	Hipodromo Presidente Remon, Panama City, Panama	
8	Win	8–0	Antonio Jaramillo	UD	6 (6)	1996-06-15	Gimnasio Nuevo Panama, Panama City, Panama	
7	Win	7–0	Anel Mitre	KO	2 (6)	1996-06-01	Gimnasio Nuevo Panama, Panama City, Panama	
6	Win	6–0	Jorge Caicedo	UD	6 (6)	1996-05-03	Hipodromo Presidente Remon, Panama City, Panama	
5	Win	5–0	Eric Aguilar	TKO	3 (6)	1996-04-17	Discoteca Dreams, Panama City, Panama	
4	Win	4–0	Mauricio Santizo	TKO	2 (4)	1996-02-23	Hipodromo Presidente Remon, Panama City, Panama	
3	Win	3–0	Agustin Ortega	UD	4 (4)	1996-02-02	Arena Panama Al Brown, Colón, Panama	
2	Win	2–0	Manuel Ortega	TKO	3 (4)	1995-10-14	Panama City, Panama	
1	Win	1–0	Eric Jimenez	TKO	2 (4)	1995-09-30	Gimnasio Kiwanis, Panama City, Panama	

== Death ==
Immediately following the bout with Montiel, Alcazar was declared healthy by ringside doctors, with no visible signs of any trauma. He went sightseeing the day after the fight and was in his hotel room getting ready to fly back to Panama when he collapsed. He was taken to hospital, where he died.

This was the first time in boxing history that a boxer is known to have collapsed so long after the end of a fight. The boxing authorities have discussed compulsory medical testing for boxers up to 48 hours after a fight finishes, longer than heretofore. There was already concern following the Michael Watson case, which in the United Kingdom established the principle that the authorities have a wide responsibility for the health and safety of boxers (and also spectators). Alcazar's death highlighted the manner in which it can take an extended time before potentially life-threatening symptoms present themselves.

He was a protégé of the legendary Hall of Famer Roberto Durán, who was a pallbearer at his funeral.

== See also ==
- List of world super-flyweight boxing champions
- List of deaths due to injuries sustained in boxing

Sporting positions
Regional boxing titles
New title	WBO Inter-Continental super-flyweight champion May 16, 1998 – 1999; Vacated	Vacant Title next held by Vernie Torres
Vacant Title last held by José Bonilla	WBA Fedelatin super-flyweight champion November 17, 1999 – 1999; Vacated	Vacant Title next held by Jorge Otero
Vacant Title last held by Joel Luna Zárate	WBO Latino super-flyweight champion February 3, 2001 – June 16, 2001; Won world title	Vacant Title next held by José López
World boxing titles
Preceded by Adonis Rivas	WBO super-flyweight champion June 16, 2001 – June 22, 2002	Succeeded by Fernando Montiel
Status
Preceded by José Bonilla	Latest born world champion to die June 24, 2002 – May 7, 2007	Succeeded by Diego Corrales
