= Ciso =

Ciso may refer to:

- CISO-FM, a Canadian radio station
- Chief information security officer
- Ciso, a Flemish comics magazine who founded the Bronzen Adhemar prize

== People with the given name Ciso ==
- Ciso Morales, Filipino boxer
- Ciso Bernardo, Filipino basketball player
