= Isidro García (boxer) =

Mexican boxer (born 1976)

Isidro García Ayala
Personal information
- Nickname: El Chino
- Born: Isidro García Ayala; 15 May 1976 (age 50) Taxco de Alarcón, Mexico
- Height: 1.70 m (5 ft 7 in)
- Weight: Featherweight; Bantamweight; Flyweight

Boxing career
- Reach: 182 cm (72 in)
- Stance: Orthodox

Boxing record
- Total fights: 34
- Wins: 25
- Win by KO: 8
- Losses: 7
- Draws: 2
- No contests: 0

Isidro García Ayala (born 15 May 1976) is a Mexican former professional boxer who competed from 1994 to 2010. He held the WBO flyweight title from 1999 to 2000.

== Professional career ==
In May 1998, Isidro won the WBO NABO flyweight title by beating veteran Everardo Morales and ended up making four title defences.

=== WBO flyweight title ===
On December 18, 1999 García won the WBO Flyweight title by upsetting Puerto Rico's José López over twelve rounds. Lopez at the time was scheduled to fight Alejandro Montiel, who withdrew hours before the fight. García, a spectator on that night, agreed to fight in Montiel's stead and won, to much surprise, using borrowed equipment. He also defended his title successfully against Jose Rafael Sosa in Córdoba, Argentina.

| Preceded by Jose Lopez Bueno | WBO Flyweight Champion; 18 December 1999– 15 December 2000 | Succeeded by Fernando Montiel |

== See also ==
- List of Mexican boxing world champions
- List of WBO world champions
- List of flyweight boxing champions
