= Fernando Montiel =

Mexican boxer (born 1979)

Personal information
- Nickname: Cochulito
- Born: Fernando Montiel Martínez; March 1, 1979 (age 47) Los Mochis, Sinaloa, Mexico
- Height: 5 ft 4 in (163 cm)
- Weight: Flyweight; Super flyweight; Bantamweight; Super bantamweight; Featherweight

Boxing career
- Reach: 66 1/2 in (169 cm)
- Stance: Orthodox

Boxing record
- Total fights: 62
- Wins: 54
- Win by KO: 39
- Losses: 6
- Draws: 2

Fernando Montiel Martínez (born March 1, 1979) is a Mexican former professional boxer. He is a three-division world champion, having held the WBO flyweight title from 2001 to 2002, the WBO junior bantamweight title twice between 2002 and 2008, and the unified WBC and WBO bantamweight titles from 2010 to 2011.

== Early life ==
Fernando Montiel is the youngest child of Manuel Montiel Sr., a former professional boxer and was Fernando's trainer. Fernando has four brothers that are former professional boxers: Eduardo Montiel, Alejandro Felix Montiel, Pedro Montiel and Manuel Montiel Jr. Fernando learnt the sport of boxing in his father's gym located in Los Mochis, Sinaloa, Mexico alongside fellow boxer, Jorge "Travieso" Arce.

Regarding his nickname, Fernando explained that one of his father's sisters could not pronounce his father's name, Manuel de Jesus, when she was of younger age, so she called her brother "Cochul." The nickname was later on passed to Fernando in diminutive form, since "Cochulito" roughly translates into "Little Cochul." The nickname has no relation to a rooster, as many have argued.

== Professional career ==
=== Early years at flyweight ===
Montiel made his professional debut on December 6, 1996, at the age of 16. He accumulated a record of 20–0–1, which included a win over future champion Cruz Carbajal, before challenging WBO Flyweight Champion Isidro García. Montiel won the bout by seventh-round TKO to become champion at age 20. He defended the Flyweight title three times against Olympic medalist Zoltan Lunka, former champion Juan Domingo Córdoba and future champion Jose "Carita" Lopez.

=== Super flyweight ===
In his next bout, Montiel moved up to the super flyweight division and defeated WBO Champion Pedro Alcázar, who died as a consequence of the blows suffered during their bout. He defended the super flyweight title against Roy Doliguez and also defeated former champion Ruben Sánchez León, but then lost the title to Mark Johnson by majority decision.

Montiel won all three of his bouts in 2004 then regained the WBO title by knocking out champion Ivan Hernández, who had recently knocked out Johnson. Montiel defended his super flyweight title against Evert Briceno (21–2) and Pramuansak Posuwan (29–0–1). In his next bout, he moved up to the bantamweight division and challenged WBO Champion Jhonny González, but lost the bout by split decision. Montiel returned to the super flyweight division and continued defending his title by defeating Z Gorres (26–1–1), Cecilio Santos (22–7–2), Luis Melendez (25–2–1), and former champion Martín Castillo (33–2–0). On May 31, 2008, in San Luis Potosí, Mexico, Montiel defeated Luis Maldonado by third-round technical knockout to successfully defend his WBO title for the eighth time. Montiel knocked Maldonado down in rounds one and three and the bout was stopped during Montiel's follow-up barrage.

=== Bantamweight ===
==== WBO champion ====
In his next match, he moved up to the bantamweight division and defeated future champion Juan Alberto Rosas. On March 28, 2009, he defeated Diego Oscar Silva (24–1–3) by third round knock out to win the Interim WBO Bantamweight title. On April 25, Montiel became a three division champion after being elevated to full Bantamweight Champion.

On September 12, 2009, Montiel faced fellow Mexican Alejandro Valdez (21–3–2) at the Palenque de la Feria in Tepic, Nayarit. The bout ended via technical draw at the 3rd round. On February 13, 2010, Montiel defeated Filipino prospect Ciso Morales (14–0) via KO at the 1st round, successfully defending his WBO Bantamweight title.

==== Unified WBC and WBO champion ====
On April 30, 2010, Montiel faced WBC Bantamweight Champion Hozumi Hasegawa in Tokyo, Japan. Montiel, who was a heavy underdog leading up to the bout, knocked out Hasegawa in the fourth round, putting an end to the Japanese fighter's 5-year title reign. With the win, Montiel unified the WBC and WBO Bantamweight titles.

On October 30, 2010, Montiel successfully defended his titles against Rafael Concepción. Montiel dropped Concepcion to the canvas twice in the second round before knocking him out in the third round.

==== Losing the titles to Donaire ====
On October 4, 2010, promoter Bob Arum announced that Fernando Montiel and Nonito Donaire are on course for a February 19, 2011 bout. Before his bout with Donaire, Fernando had a 10-round non-title bout against fellow Mexican Jovanny Soto, on December 10, 2010 in Saltillo, Coahuila. Montiel defeated Soto via KO in the second round.

On February 19, 2011, the fight against Nonito Donaire took place at the Mandalay Bay in Las Vegas, Nevada. Montiel suffered his first TKO loss in the second round.

==== Further setbacks ====
Montiel announced in the Mexican media that he would return to the ring in the super bantamweight division, as he had difficulties making the 118 pound bantamweight limit during his fight against Donaire. He rebounded with wins over future champion Nehomar Cermeno and Alvaro Perez, then faced Victor Terrazas for the vacant WBC Silver Super Bantamweight title, but was defeated by 12 round decision in what was considered an upset.

After putting together an 8 fight winning streak, during which he moved up to the Featherweight division and secured a win over former champion Cristobal Cruz, he faced Lee Selby for the IBF World Featherweight Title but lost a 12 round decision. In his following fight, Montiel suffered a first round knockout loss to Jorge Lara.

== Professional boxing record ==
62 fights	54 wins	6 losses
By knockout	39	2
By decision	15	4
Draws	2	

No.	Result	Record	Opponent	Type	Round, time	Date	Location	Notes
62	Loss	54–6–2	Jorge Lara	KO	1 (10), 1:37	Apr 30, 2016	StubHub Center, Carson, California, U.S.	
61	Loss	54–5–2	Lee Selby	UD	12	Oct 14, 2015	Gila River Arena, Glendale, Arizona, U.S.	For IBF featherweight title
60	Win	54–4–2	Rogelio Jun Doliguez	UD	10	Mar 14, 2015	Auditorio Fausto Gutierrez Moreno, Tijuana, Mexico	
59	Win	53–4–2	Sergio Puente	UD	10	Nov 8, 2014	Gimnasio Nuevo León, Monterrey, Mexico	
58	Win	52–4–2	Jesus Antonio Rios	KO	1 (10), 1:36	Jul 26, 2014	Auditorio Municipal, Villaflores, Mexico	
57	Win	51–4–2	Cristóbal Cruz	MD	10	Mar 15, 2014	Palenque, Mexico	
56	Win	50–4–2	Jaderes Padua	KO	3 (12), 1:12	Jun 22, 2013	Hotel Azul, Zihuatanejo, Mexico	Retained WBC–USNBC Silver super bantamweight title
55	Win	49–4–2	Giovanni Caro	UD	12	Nov 24, 2012	Gimnasio Municipal "Josué Neri Santos", Ciudad Juárez, Mexico	Won vacant WBC–USNBC Silver super bantamweight title
54	Win	48–4–2	Arturo Santos Reyes	SD	12	Jun 9, 2012	Gimnasio Manuel Bernardo Aguirre, Chihuahua, Mexico	
53	Win	47–4–2	Angky Angkotta	KO	9 (10), 2:32	Mar 3, 2012	Mazatlán, Mexico	
52	Loss	46–4–2	Victor Terrazas	UD	12	Nov 19, 2011	Estadio Centenario, Los Mochis, Mexico	For vacant WBC Silver super bantamweight title
51	Win	46–3–2	Alvaro Perez	KO	3 (10), 1:26	Aug 20, 2011	La Cetto Vineyard, Guadalupe, Mexico	
50	Win	45–3–2	Nehomar Cermeño	RTD	3 (12), 0:10	Jun 25, 2011	Estadio Banorte, Culiacán, Mexico	
49	Loss	44–3–2	Nonito Donaire	TKO	2 (12), 2:25	Feb 19, 2011	Mandalay Bay Events Center, Paradise, Nevada, U.S.	Lost WBC and WBO bantamweight titles
48	Win	44–2–2	Jovanny Soto	KO	2 (10), 2:29	Dec 10, 2010	Gimnasio Municipal, Saltillo, Mexico	
47	Win	43–2–2	Rafael Concepción	KO	3 (12), 1:07	Jul 17, 2010	Palenque de la Feria, Tuxtla Gutiérrez, Mexico	Retained WBC and WBO bantamweight titles
46	Win	42–2–2	Hozumi Hasegawa	TKO	4 (12), 2:59	Apr 30, 2010	Nippon Budokan, Tokyo, Japan	Won WBC bantamweight title
45	Win	41–2–2	Ciso Morales	TKO	1 (12), 2:06	Feb 13, 2010	Las Vegas Hilton, Winchester, Nevada, U.S.	Retained WBO bantamweight title
44	Draw	40–2–2	Alejandro Valdez	TD	3 (10)	Sep 12, 2009	Palenque de la Feria, Tepic, Mexico	
43	Win	40–2–1	Diego Oscar Silva	KO	3 (12) 2:44	Mar 28, 2009	Bullring by the Sea, Tijuana, Mexico	Won WBO interim bantamweight title
42	Win	39–2–1	Juan Alberto Rosas	UD	10	Nov 2, 2008	Feria Nacional de San Marcos, Aguascalientes, Mexico	
41	Win	38–2–1	Luis Maldonado	TKO	3 (12) 2:58	May 31, 2008	Plaza de Toros Monumental "El Paseo", San Luis Potosí, Mexico	Retained WBO junior bantamweight title
40	Win	37–2–1	Martín Castillo	KO	4 (12) 1:56	Feb 16, 2008	MGM Grand Garden Arena, Paradise, Nevada, U.S.	Retained WBO junior bantamweight title
39	Win	36–2–1	Luis Melendez	TKO	12 (12), 1:58	Oct 4, 2007	The Joint, Paradise, Nevada, U.S.	Retained WBO junior bantamweight title
38	Win	35–2–1	Cecilio Santos	TKO	10 (12) 2:15	Jul 14, 2007	Explanada Tecate, Ciudad Obregón, Mexico	Retained WBO junior bantamweight title
37	Win	34–2–1	Z Gorres	SD	12	Feb 24, 2007	Sports Complex, Cebu City, Philippines	Retained WBO junior bantamweight title
36	Loss	33–2–1	Jhonny González	SD	12	May 27, 2006	Home Depot Center, Carson, California, U.S.	For WBO bantamweight title
35	Win	33–1–1	Pramuansak Posuwan	UD	12	Oct 29, 2005	Desert Diamond Casino, Tucson, Arizona, U.S.	Retained WBO junior bantamweight title
34	Win	32–1–1	Everth Briceno	UD	12	Jul 16, 2005	MGM Grand Garden Arena, Paradise, Nevada, U.S.	Retained WBO junior bantamweight title
33	Win	31–1–1	Ivan Hernández	KO	7 (12) 1:48	Apr 9, 2005	Don Haskins Center, El Paso, Texas, U.S.	Won WBO junior bantamweight title
32	Win	30–1–1	Reynaldo Hurtado	KO	7 (10) 1:30	Sep 3, 2004	Desert Diamond Casino, Phoenix, Arizona, U.S.	
31	Win	29–1–1	Samuel Lopez	KO	3 (10) 2:02	Apr 29, 2004	Entertainment Center, Laredo, Texas, U.S.	
30	Win	28–1–1	Roberto Lopez	TKO	3 (10) 2:38	Jan 16, 2004	Dodge Arena, Hidalgo, Texas, U.S.	
29	Loss	27–1–1	Mark Johnson	MD	12	Aug 16, 2003	Mohegan Sun Arena, Montville, Connecticut, U.S.	Lost WBO junior bantamweight title
28	Win	27–0–1	Ruben Sánchez León	TKO	2 (10) 3:00	May 9, 2003	Sports Arena, San Diego, California, U.S.	
27	Win	26–0–1	Roy Doliguez	TKO	2 (12)	Jan 18, 2003	Estadio Emilio Ibarra Almada, Los Mochis, Mexico	Retained WBO junior bantamweight title
26	Win	25–0–1	Pedro Alcázar	TKO	6 (12) 1:16	Jun 22, 2002	MGM Grand Garden Arena, Paradise, Nevada, U.S.	Won WBO junior bantamweight title
25	Win	24–0–1	José López	UD	12	Sep 8, 2001	Lawlor Events Center, Reno, Nevada, U.S.	Retained WBO flyweight title
24	Win	23–0–1	Juan Domingo Cordoba	KO	1 (12) 2:15	May 25, 2001	Discoteca El Alebrije, Acapulco, Mexico	Retained WBO flyweight title
23	Win	22–0–1	Zoltan Lunka	TKO	7 (12) 2:03	Mar 24, 2001	Rudi-Sedlmayer-Halle, Munich, Germany	Retained WBO flyweight title
22	Win	21–0–1	Isidro García	TKO	7 (12) 2:15	Dec 15, 2000	Centro de Espectáculos Modelo, Ciudad Obregón, Mexico	Won WBO flyweight title
21	Win	20–0–1	Osvaldo Guerrero	KO	8	Sep 8, 2000	Gimnasio Municipal, Ciudad Obregón, Mexico	
20	Win	19–0–1	Cruz Carbajal	TKO	4	Apr 14, 2000	Los Mochis, Mexico	
19	Win	18–0–1	Armando Correa	KO	5	Mar 17, 2000	Mexico City, Mexico	
18	Win	17–0–1	Sergio Millan	PTS	10	Dec 3, 1999	Los Mochis, Mexico	
17	Win	16–0–1	Ruben Diaz	PTS	12	Sep 11, 1999	Ciudad Obregón, Mexico	Won vacant WBA North American super flyweight title
16	Win	15–0–1	Cesar Ricardo Martinez	KO	5	Apr 16, 1999	Auditorio Benito Juárez, Los Mochis, Mexico	
15	Win	14–0–1	Jose Alonso	UD	10	Jan 29, 1999	Gimnasio Municipal, Ciudad Obregón, Mexico	
14	Win	13–0–1	Paulino Villalobos	UD	10	Oct 9, 1998	Ciudad Obregón, Mexico	
13	Draw	12–0–1	Paulino Villalobos	PTS	10	Jul 31, 1998	Ciudad Obregón, Mexico	
12	Win	12–0	Javier Varguez	PTS	10	Jun 5, 1998	Ciudad Obregón, Mexico	
11	Win	11–0	Leonardo Rodriguez	KO	3	Mar 20, 1998	Los Mochis, Mexico	
10	Win	10–0	Jose Manuel Navarro	KO	1	Feb 13, 1998	Ciudad Obregón, Mexico	
9	Win	9–0	Lorenzo Trejo	TKO	7	Dec 5, 1997	Ciudad Obregón, Mexico	
8	Win	8–0	Hugo Hernandez	TKO	1	Oct 10, 1997	Ciudad Obregón, Mexico	
7	Win	7–0	Jesus Rodriguez	TKO	1	Jul 18, 1997	Los Mochis, Mexico	
6	Win	6–0	Martin Robles	KO	2	May 16, 1997	Navojoa, Mexico	
5	Win	5–0	Manuel Vega	KO	3	Apr 30, 1997	Ciudad Obregón, Mexico	
4	Win	4–0	Maury Ayala	KO	1	Apr 18, 1997	Ciudad Obregón, Mexico	
3	Win	3–0	Noe Acosta	TKO	2	Mar 20, 1997	Ciudad Obregón, Mexico	
2	Win	2–0	Marcos Mendivil	KO	1	Feb 28, 1997	Ciudad Obregón, Mexico	
1	Win	1–0	Manuel Tamayo	TKO	2	Dec 6, 1996	Los Mochis, Mexico	Professional debut

== Titles in boxing ==
=== Major world titles ===
- WBO flyweight champion (112 lbs)
- WBO super flyweight champion (115 lbs) (2×)
- WBC bantamweight champion (118 lbs)
- WBO bantamweight champion (118 lbs)

=== Interim world titles ===
- WBO interim bantamweight champion (118 lbs)

=== Regional/International titles ===
- WBA North American super flyweight champion (115 lbs)
- USNBC Silver super bantamweight champion (122 lbs)

=== Honorary titles ===
- WBO Super Champion

== See also ==
- List of boxing triple champions
- List of Mexican boxing world champions

Sporting positions
Regional boxing titles
New title	WBA North American super flyweight champion September 11, 1999 – December 2000; Vacated	Title discontinued
New title	WBC–USNBC Silver super bantamweight champion September 24, 2012 – March 2014; Vacated	Title discontinued
World boxing titles
Preceded by Isidro García	WBO flyweight champion December 15, 2000 – June 22, 2002; Vacated	Succeeded by Adonis Rivas promoted from interim status
Preceded by Pedro Alcázar	WBO junior bantamweight champion July 22, 2002 – August 16, 2003	Succeeded by Mark Johnson
Preceded by Ivan Hernández	WBO junior bantamweight champion April 9, 2005 – February 10, 2009; Vacated	Vacant Title next held by José López
Vacant Title last held by Jorge Eliécer Julio	WBO bantamweight champion Interim title March 28, 2009 – April 25, 2009; Promoted	Vacant Title next held by Eric Morel
Preceded by Gerry Peñalosa stripped	WBO bantamweight champion April 25, 2009 – February 19, 2011	Succeeded by Nonito Donaire
Preceded by Hozumi Hasegawa	WBC bantamweight champion April 30, 2010 – February 19, 2011	Succeeded by Nonito Donaire
