= Victor Godoi =

Argentine boxer

Personal information
- Nickname: Cococho
- Born: Victor Godoi; March 31, 1975 (age 51) Comodoro Rivadavia, Argentina
- Weight: Flyweight; Super flyweight; Bantamweight

Boxing career
- Stance: Orthodox

Boxing record
- Total fights: 36
- Wins: 31
- Win by KO: 27
- Losses: 5
- Draws: 0
- No contests: 0

Victor Godoi (born March 31, 1975) is a retired Argentine boxer.

== Professional career ==
He made his professional debut on October 13, 1995, in his debut he knocked Pedro Echiguay in the first round. By the end of 1997 he had amassed a record of 24-1. He defeated, among others, former world title contenders, Victor Fuentealba and Alli Galvez. On November 7, 1998, he earned the chance to fight for the interim WBO super flyweight title, his rival was Mexican Pedro Morquecho whom Godoi beat via a split decision. After Johnny Tapia moved up to bantamweight Godoi became the full champion. Godoi lost the title in his first defense of the title against Diego Morales in what would be his only fight outside Argentina. After losing the title, he fought five more times going 2-3, he ended his career in 2005 when he lost to Jose Saez.

== See also ==
- List of super-flyweight boxing champions

Achievements
Regional boxing titles
New title	WBO super flyweight champion Latino title March 8, 1997 – November 7, 1998; Won interim world title	Vacant Title next held by Michael Carbajal
World boxing titles
New title	WBO super flyweight Champion; Interim Title; November 7, 1998 – December, 1998; Promoted	Vacant
Preceded by Johnny Tapia; Vacated	WBO super flyweight Champion; December, 1998 – June 7, 1999	Succeeded by Diego Morales
