= List of WBO world champions =

This is a list of WBO world champions, showing every world champion certified by the World Boxing Organization (WBO). The WBO is one of the four major governing bodies in professional boxing, and has awarded world championships in 17 different weight classes since 1989.

Boxers who won the title but were stripped due to the title bout being overturned to a no contest are not listed.

Current champion
Most consecutive title defenses

== Heavyweight ==
No.	Name	Reign	Defenses
1	Francesco Damiani (def. Johnny du Plooy)	6 May 1989 – 11 Jan 1991	1
2	Ray Mercer	11 Jan – 28 Dec 1991	1
Mercer was stripped of the title in December 1991 for signing for a bout against Larry Holmes instead of mandatory challenger Michael Moorer.
3	Michael Moorer (def. Bert Cooper)	15 May 1992 – 8 Feb 1993	0
Moorer vacated the title so that he could be ranked by other sanctioning bodies.
4	Tommy Morrison (def. George Foreman)	7 Jun – 29 Oct 1993	1
5	Michael Bentt	29 Oct 1993 – 19 Mar 1994	0
6	Herbie Hide	19 Mar 1994 – 11 Mar 1995	0
7	Riddick Bowe	11 Mar 1995 – 5 May 1996	1
Bowe was stripped of the title when he rejected Don King's purse offer.
8	Henry Akinwande (def. Jeremy Williams)	29 Jun 1996 – 29 Jan 1997	2
Akinwande vacated the title at the request of the WBC to become the mandatory challenger of the upcoming fight between Lennox Lewis and Oliver McCall for the vacant belt.
9	Herbie Hide (2) (def. Tony Tucker)	28 Jun 1997 – 26 Jun 1999	2
10	Vitali Klitschko	26 Jun 1999 – 1 Apr 2000	2
11	Chris Byrd	1 Apr – 14 Oct 2000	0
12	Wladimir Klitschko	14 Oct 2000 – 8 Mar 2003	5
13	Corrie Sanders	8 Mar – 7 Oct 2003	0
Sanders vacated the title to sign with Don King.
14	Lamon Brewster (def. Wladimir Klitschko)	10 Apr 2004 – 1 Apr 2006	3
15	Siarhei Liakhovich	1 Apr – 4 Nov 2006	0
16	Shannon Briggs	4 Nov 2006 – 2 Jun 2007	0
17	Sultan Ibragimov	2 Jun 2007 – 23 Feb 2008	1
18	Wladimir Klitschko (2)	23 Feb 2008 – 28 Nov 2015	14
19	Tyson Fury	28 Nov 2015 – 12 Oct 2016	0
Fury, who had previously withdrawn from a rematch against Wladimir Klitschko before testing positive in a Voluntary Anti-Doping Association (VADA) test for cocaine on 29 September, vacated the title on 12 October 2016 after testing positive a second time, citing his need to focus on treatment for depression.
20	Joseph Parker (def. Andy Ruiz Jr.)	10 Dec 2016 – 31 Mar 2018	2
21	Anthony Joshua	31 Mar 2018 – 1 Jun 2019	1
22	Andy Ruiz Jr.	1 Jun – 7 Dec 2019	0
23	Anthony Joshua (2)	7 Dec 2019 – 25 Sep 2021	1
24	Oleksandr Usyk	25 Sep 2021 – 17 Nov 2025	5
Usyk vacated the title.
25	Fabio Wardley (interim champion promoted)	17 Nov 2025 – 9 May 2026	0
26	Daniel Dubois	9 May 2026 – present	1

== Junior heavyweight ==
This weight class is designated as cruiserweight by the WBA, WBC, and IBF.

No.	Name	Reign	Defenses
1	Boone Pultz (def. Magne Havnå)	3 Dec 1989 – 17 May 1990	0
2	Magne Havnå	17 May 1990 – 1991	2
Havnå vacates the title.
3	Tyrone Booze (def. Derek Angol)	25 Jul 1992 – 13 Feb 1993	1
4	Markus Bott	13 Feb – 26 Jun 1993	0
5	Nestor Hipolito Giovannini	26 Jun 1993 – 17 Dec 1994	1
6	Dariusz Michalczewski	17 Dec 1994 – Mar 1995	0
Michalczewski vacated the title in favor of the WBO light heavyweight title, which he already held.
7	Ralf Rocchigiani (def. Carl Thompson)	10 Jun 1995 – 4 Oct 1997	6
8	Carl Thompson	4 Oct 1997 – 27 Mar 1999	2
9	Johnny Nelson	27 Mar 1999 – 22 Sep 2006	13
Nelson retired after suffering a back injury during training camp for his bout against Enzo Maccarinelli.
10	Enzo Maccarinelli (interim champion promoted)	22 Sep 2006 – 8 Mar 2008	4
11	David Haye	8 Mar – 14 Jul 2008	0
Haye vacates the title to move up to heavyweight.
12	Victor Emilio Ramírez (interim champion promoted)	Feb – 5 Dec 2009	1
13	Marco Huck	5 Dec 2009 – 14 Aug 2015	13
14	Krzysztof Głowacki	14 Aug 2015 – 17 Sep 2016	1
15	Oleksandr Usyk	17 Sep 2016 – 5 Jun 2019	6
Usyk vacated the title to move up to heavyweight.
16	Krzysztof Głowacki (2) (interim champion promoted)	5 Jun – 15 Jun 2019	0
17	Mairis Briedis	15 Jun – 25 Nov 2019	0
Briedis stripped of title for disagreeing to an immediate rematch with Głowacki.
18	Lawrence Okolie (def. Krzysztof Głowacki)	20 Mar 2021 – 27 May 2023	3
19	Chris Billam-Smith	27 May 2023 – 16 Nov 2024	2
20	Gilberto Ramírez	16 Nov 2024 – 2 May 2026	1
21	David Benavidez	2 May 2026 – present	0

== Light heavyweight ==
No.	Name	Reign	Defenses
1	Michael Moorer (def. Ramzi Hassan)	3 Dec 1988 – 1991	9
Moorer vacated the title to move up to heavyweight.
2	Leeonzer Barber (def. Tom Collins)	9 May 1991 – 10 Sep 1994	4
3	Dariusz Michalczewski	10 Sep 1994 – 10 Oct 2003	23
4	Julio César González	10 Oct 2003 – 17 Jan 2004	0
5	Zsolt Erdei	17 Jan 2004 – 13 Nov 2009	11
Erdei vacated the title to move up to cruiserweight.
6	Jürgen Brähmer (interim champion promoted)	13 Nov 2009 – 19 May 2011	2
Brähmer was stripped of the title after withdrawing from a bout against Nathan Cleverly, citing an eye injury.
7	Nathan Cleverly (interim champion promoted)	19 May 2011 – 18 Aug 2013	5
8	Sergey Kovalev	18 Aug 2013 – 19 Nov 2016	8
9	Andre Ward	19 Nov 2016 – 21 Sep 2017	1
Ward retires.
10	Sergey Kovalev (2) (def. Vyacheslav Shabranskyy)	25 Nov 2017 – 4 Aug 2018	1
11	Eleider Álvarez	4 Aug 2018 – 2 Feb 2019	0
12	Sergey Kovalev (3)	2 Feb – 2 Nov 2019	1
13	Canelo Álvarez	2 Nov – 17 Dec 2019	0
Álvarez vacated the title to move down to super middleweight.
14	Joe Smith Jr. (def. Maxim Vlasov)	10 Apr 2021 – 18 Jun 2022	1
15	Artur Beterbiev	18 Jun 2022 – 22 Feb 2025	3
16	Dmitry Bivol	22 Feb 2025 – present	0

== Super middleweight ==
No.	Name	Reign	Defenses
1	Thomas Hearns (def. James Kinchen)	4 Nov 1988 – 20 May 1991	2
Hearns's title was vacated on WBO's April 1991 ratings posted on 8 May. He later moved up to light heavyweight.
2	Chris Eubank (def. Michael Watson)	21 Sep 1991 – 18 Mar 1995	14
3	Steve Collins	18 Mar 1995 – 2 Oct 1997	7
Collins was stripped of the title in October 1997 after suffering a leg injury during training camp and subsequently withdrawing from his bout against Joe Calzaghe.
4	Joe Calzaghe (def. Chris Eubank)	11 Oct 1997 – 26 Sep 2008	21
Calzaghe, citing difficulty making weight, vacated the title after moving up to light heavyweight.
5	Denis Inkin (def. Fulgencio Zuniga)	27 Sep 2008 – 10 Jan 2009	0
6	Károly Balzsay	10 Jan – 22 Aug 2009	1
7	Robert Stieglitz	22 Aug 2009 – 25 Aug 2012	6
8	Arthur Abraham	25 Aug 2012 – 23 Mar 2013	1
9	Robert Stieglitz (2)	23 Mar 2013 – 1 Mar 2014	2
10	Arthur Abraham (2)	1 Mar 2014 – 9 Apr 2016	5
11	Gilberto Ramírez	9 Apr 2016 – 13 May 2019	5
Ramírez vacates the title to move up to light heavyweight.
12	Billy Joe Saunders (def. Shefat Isufi)	18 May 2019 – 8 May 2021	2
13	Canelo Álvarez	8 May 2021 – 13 Sep 2025	6
14	Terence Crawford	13 Sep – 21 Dec 2025	0
Crawford vacated the title five days after announcing his retirement.
15	Hamzah Sheeraz (def. Alem Begic)	23 May – 18 Sep 2026	1
Sheeraz vacated the title after refusing to fight mandatory challenger Janibek Alimkhanuly.

== Middleweight ==
No.	Name	Reign	Defenses
1	Doug DeWitt (def. Robbie Sims)	18 Apr 1989 – 29 Apr 1990	1
2	Nigel Benn	29 Apr – 18 Nov 1990	1
3	Chris Eubank	18 Nov 1990 – 17 Jul 1991	3
Eubank was expected to move up to super middleweight, the title was then reportedly vacated 1 day after.
4	Gerald McClellan (def. John Mugabi)	20 Nov 1991 – 2 Apr 1993	0
McClellan vacated the title to move up to super middleweight.
5	Chris Pyatt (def. Sumbu Kalambay)	19 May 1993 – 11 May 1994	2
6	Steve Collins	11 May 1994 – 22 Apr 1995	0
Collins vacated the title to stay super middleweight.
7	Lonnie Bradley (def. David Mendez)	19 May 1995 – 7 Nov 1997	6
Rhodes and Grant was supposedly going to fight for the interim title because of Bradley's injury, but was later changed to the vacant title.
8	Otis Grant (def. Ryan Rhodes)	13 Dec 1997 – 14 Nov 1998	1
Grant vacated the title to move up to light heavyweight and challenge Roy Jones Jr.
9	Bert Schenk (def. Freeman Barr)	30 Jan – 14 Jul 1999	1
Schenk vacated the title due to acute lumbago.
10	Jason Matthews (def. Ryan Rhodes)	17 Jul – 27 Nov 1999	0
11	Armand Krajnc	27 Nov 1999 – 6 Apr 2002	3
Krajnc vacated the title on 4 June 2001, while in a dispute with Universum Box-Promotion. However the WBO unanimously voted on 17 September 2001 that Krajnc had remained WBO champion throughout the dispute.
12	Harry Simon	6 Apr 2002 – 8 Jul 2003	0
Simon was involved in a car accident and was sidelined for 8 months resulting in being stripped of the title.
13	Héctor Velazco (interim champion promoted)	8 Jul – 13 Sep 2003	0
14	Felix Sturm	13 Sep 2003 – 5 Jun 2004	1
15	Oscar De La Hoya	5 Jun – 18 Sep 2004	0
16	Bernard Hopkins	18 Sep 2004 – 16 Jul 2005	1
17	Jermain Taylor	16 Jul 2005 – 29 Sep 2007	3
18	Kelly Pavlik	29 Sep 2007 – 17 Apr 2010	3
19	Sergio Martínez	17 Apr – 29 May 2010	0
Martínez, who held the WBC junior middleweight title at that time, was stripped of the WBO middleweight title because he missed the WBO's deadline to decide on which weight class he would continue to fight in.
20	Dmitry Pirog (def. Daniel Jacobs)	31 Jul 2010 – 25 Aug 2012	3
Pirog is stripped of title for choosing to fight Gennady Golovkin instead of mandatory challenger Hassan N'Dam N'Jikam.
21	Hassan N'Dam N'Jikam (interim champion promoted)	25 Aug – 20 Oct 2012	0
22	Peter Quillin	20 Oct 2012 – 4 Sep 2014	3
Quillin vacated the title after pulling out of his scheduled bout against mandatory challenger Matt Korobov.
23	Andy Lee (def. Matt Korobov)	13 Dec 2014 – 19 Dec 2015	0
24	Billy Joe Saunders	19 Dec 2015 – 11 Oct 2018	3
Saunders tested positive for the banned stimulant oxilofrine before his bout against mandatory challenger Demetrius Andrade and vacated the title citing his lack of time to appeal.
25	Demetrius Andrade (def. Walter Kautondokwa)	20 Oct 2018 – 26 Aug 2022	5
Andrade vacated the title to move up to super middleweight.
26	Janibek Alimkhanuly (interim champion promoted)	26 Aug 2022 – 20 Jul 2026	4
Alimkhanuly vacated the title to move up to super middleweight.
27	Denzel Bentley (interim champion promoted)	20 Jul – 30 Oct 2026	0
Bentley was stripped of the title for refusing to fight his mandatory challenger Yoenlis Hernández.

== Junior middleweight ==
No.	Name	Reign	Defenses
1	John David Jackson (def. Lupe Aquino)	8 Dec 1988 – 17 Feb 1990	1
The title was vacated after an incorrect NC call in his bout against Martin Camara.
2	John David Jackson (2) (def. Chris Pyatt)	23 Oct 1990 – 5 Aug 1993	3
Jackson vacated the title to move up to middleweight.
3	Verno Phillips (def. Lupe Aquino)	30 Oct 1993 – 22 Nov 1995	4
4	Paul Jones	22 Nov 1995 – 26 Feb 1996	0
Jones was stripped of the title after withdrawing from a bout against no. 1 contender Bronco McKart.
5	Bronco McKart (def. Santos Cardona)	1 Mar – 17 May 1996	0
6	Winky Wright	17 May 1996 – 22 Aug 1998	3
7	Harry Simon	22 Aug 1998 – 27 Nov 2001	4
Simon vacated the title to move up to middleweight.
8	Daniel Santos (def. Yori Boy Campas)	16 Mar 2002 – 3 Dec 2005	4
9	Serhiy Dzyndzyruk	3 Dec 2005 – 5 Oct 2011	6
Dzindziruk was stripped of the title due to inactivity caused by injuries.
10	Zaurbek Baysangurov (interim champion promoted)	5 Oct 2011 – 22 Jul 2013	2
Baysangurov was stripped of the title in July 2013 after withdrawing from a bout against mandatory challenger Demetrius Andrade.
11	Demetrius Andrade (def. Vanes Martirosyan)	9 Nov 2013 – 31 Jul 2015	1
Andrade was stripped of the title due to inactivity.
12	Liam Smith (def. John Thompson)	10 Oct 2015 – 17 Sep 2016	2
13	Canelo Álvarez	17 Sep 2016 – 21 May 2017	0
Álvarez intends to stay at middleweight. The title is vacated on WBO's May 2017 rankings.
14	Miguel Cotto (def. Yoshihiro Kamegai)	26 Aug – 2 Dec 2017	0
15	Sadam Ali	2 Dec 2017 – 12 May 2018	0
16	Jaime Munguía	12 May 2018 – 23 Nov 2019	5
Munguia vacated the title to move up to middleweight.
17	Patrick Teixeira (interim champion promoted)	4 Dec 2019 – 13 Feb 2021	0
18	Brian Castaño	13 Feb 2021 – 14 May 2022	1
19	Jermell Charlo	14 May 2022 – 30 Sep 2023	0
Charlo stripped of the title for fighting Canelo Álvarez instead of mandatory challenger Tim Tszyu.
20	Tim Tszyu (interim champion promoted)	30 Sep 2023 – 30 Mar 2024	1
21	Sebastian Fundora	30 Mar 2024 – 2 May 2025	1
Fundora is stripped of the title for refusing to participate in his scheduled purse bid.
22	Xander Zayas (def. Jorge Garcia Perez)	26 Jul 2025 – 27 Jun 2026	1
23	Jaron Ennis	27 Jun 2026 – present	0

== Welterweight ==
No.	Name	Reign	Defenses
1	Genaro León (def. Danny Garcia)	6 May – 28 Nov 1989	0
Léon's title was vacated on WBO's November 1989 ratings posted on 28 November.
2	Manning Galloway (def. Al Hamza)	15 Dec 1989 – 12 Feb 1993	7
3	Gert Bo Jacobsen	12 Feb – 13 Oct 1993	0
Jacobsen was stripped of the title after withdrawing from a bout against Eamonn Loughran due to suffering from the flu.
4	Eamonn Loughran (def. Lorenzo Smith)	16 Oct 1993 – 13 Apr 1996	5
5	José Luis López	13 Apr – 21 Nov 1996	1
López was stripped of the title after testing positive for marijuana.
6	Mihai Leu (def. Santiago Samaniego)	22 Feb 1997 – 1997	1
Leu retires.
7	Akhmed Kotiev (interim champion promoted)	14 Feb 1998 – 6 May 2000	4
8	Daniel Santos	6 May 2000 – 5 Dec 2001	2
Santos vacated the title to move up to junior middleweight.
9	Antonio Margarito (def. Antonio Díaz)	16 Mar 2002 – 14 Jul 2007	7
10	Paul Williams	14 Jul 2007 – 9 Feb 2008	0
11	Carlos Quintana	9 Feb – 7 Jun 2008	0
12	Paul Williams (2)	7 Jun – 14 Nov 2008	0
Williams vacated the title to move up in weight and fight for the vacant WBO interim junior middleweight title.
13	Miguel Cotto (def. Michael Jennings)	21 Feb – 14 Nov 2009	1
14	Manny Pacquiao	14 Nov 2009 – 9 Jun 2012	3
15	Timothy Bradley	9 Jun 2012 – 12 Apr 2014	2
16	Manny Pacquiao (2)	12 Apr 2014 – 2 May 2015	1
17	Floyd Mayweather Jr.	2 May – 6 Jul 2015	0
Mayweather is stripped of the title for missing the deadline to pay the WBO's sanctioning fee from his 2 May bout against Manny Pacquiao and for continuing to hold world championship titles in multiple weight classes, a violation of the WBO's rules and regulations.
18	Timothy Bradley (2) (interim champion promoted)	6 Jul 2015 – 9 Feb 2016	1
Bradley vacated the title after he chose to fight Manny Pacquiao instead of mandatory challenger Sadam Ali.
19	Jessie Vargas (def. Sadam Ali)	5 Mar – 5 Nov 2016	0
20	Manny Pacquiao (3)	5 Nov 2016 – 2 Jul 2017	0
21	Jeff Horn	2 Jul 2017 – 9 Jun 2018	1
22	Terence Crawford	9 Jun 2018 – 12 Aug 2024	7
Crawford vacated the title to stay at junior middleweight.
23	Brian Norman Jr. (interim champion promoted)	12 Aug 2024 – 22 Nov 2025	2
24	Devin Haney	22 Nov 2025 – present	0

== Junior welterweight ==
No.	Name	Reign	Defenses
1	Héctor Camacho (def. Ray Mancini)	6 Mar 1989 – 23 Feb 1991	2
2	Greg Haugen	23 Feb – 18 May 1991	0
3	Héctor Camacho (2)	18 May 1991 – 15 May 1992	0
Camacho vacated the title to challenge the WBC champion Julio Cesar Chavez.
4	Carlos González (def. Jimmy Paul)	29 Jun 1992 – 7 Jun 1993	3
5	Zack Padilla	7 Jun 1993 – 1 Jan 1995	4
Padilla was experiencing continuous severe headaches and was found to have a small blood clot near his brain. The title was vacated.
6	Sammy Fuentes (def. Fidel Avendano)	20 Feb 1995 – 9 Mar 1996	1
7	Giovanni Parisi	9 Mar 1996 – 29 May 1998	5
8	Carlos González (2)	29 May 1998 – 15 May 1999	0
9	Randall Bailey	15 May 1999 – 22 Jul 2000	2
10	Ener Julio	22 Jul 2000 – 25 Jun 2001	0
Julio vacated the title when a routine eye exam reveals that he has cataracts.
11	DeMarcus Corley (def. Felix Flores)	30 Jun 2001 – 12 Jul 2003	2
12	Zab Judah	12 Jul 2003 – 18 Jun 2004	1
Judah vacated the title to move up to the welterweight division.
13	Miguel Cotto (def. Kelson Pinto)	11 Sep 2004 – 27 Oct 2006	6
Cotto vacated the title to move up to welterweight.
14	Ricardo Torres (def. Mike Arnaoutis)	18 Nov 2006 – 5 Jul 2008	3
15	Kendall Holt	5 July 2008 – 4 Apr 2009	1
16	Timothy Bradley	4 Apr 2009 – 27 Jun 2012	3
Bradley vacated the title after moving up to welterweight.
17	Juan Manuel Márquez (interim champion promoted)	27 Jun 2012 – 12 Oct 2013	0
The WBO decided that Márquez would be allowed to enter as a champion in his fight against Timothy Bradley, but the title would be immediately declared vacated following the fight.
18	Mike Alvarado (interim champion promoted)	12 Oct – 19 Oct 2013	0
19	Ruslan Provodnikov	19 Oct 2013 – 14 Jun 2014	0
20	Chris Algieri	14 Jun – 2 Nov 2014	0
Algieri vacated the title due to moving up and challenging WBO welterweight champion Manny Pacquiao.
21	Terence Crawford (def. Thomas Dulorme)	18 Apr 2015 – 26 Oct 2017	6
Crawford vacated the title to move up to welterweight.
22	Maurice Hooker (def. Terry Flanagan)	9 Jun 2018 – 28 Jul 2019	2
23	José Ramírez	28 Jul 2019 – 22 May 2021	1
24	Josh Taylor	22 May 2021 – 10 Jun 2023	1
25	Teofimo Lopez	10 Jun 2023 – 31 Jan 2026	3
26	Shakur Stevenson	31 Jan 2026 – present	0

== Lightweight ==
No.	Name	Reign	Defenses
1	Mauricio Aceves (def. Amancio Castro)	6 May 1989 – 22 Sep 1990	1
2	Dingaan Thobela	22 Sep 1990 – 14 Jun 1992	2
Thobela's title was vacated after failing to find an opponent by 14 June; the deadline set by the WBO.
3	Giovanni Parisi (def. Javier Altamirano)	25 Sep 1992 – 23 Jan 1994	2
Parisi vacates the title to move up to junior welterweight.
4	Oscar De La Hoya (def. Jorge Páez)	29 Jul 1994 – 9 Feb 1996	6
De La Hoya vacates the title to move up to junior welterweight.
5	Artur Grigorian (def. Antonio Rivera)	13 Apr 1996 – 3 Jan 2004	17
6	Acelino Freitas	3 Jan – 7 Aug 2004	0
7	Diego Corrales	7 Aug 2004 – 14 Jan 2006	1
Corrales was stripped of the title after deciding to pursue a rematch with José Luis Castillo instead of his mandatory challenger Acelino Freitas.
8	Acelino Freitas (2) (def. Zahir Raheem)	29 Apr 2006 – 28 Apr 2007	0
9	Juan Díaz	28 Apr 2007 – 8 Mar 2008	1
10	Nate Campbell	8 Mar 2008 – 13 Feb 2009	0
Campbell was stripped of his unified IBF/WBO world titles after failing to make weight the day before his bout against Ali Funeka.
11	Juan Manuel Márquez (def. Juan Díaz)	28 Feb 2009 – 26 Jan 2012	2
Márquez is stripped of the title for moving up to junior welterweight.
12	Ricky Burns (interim champion promoted)	26 Jan 2012 – 1 Mar 2014	4
13	Terence Crawford	1 Mar 2014 – 5 Mar 2015	2
Crawford vacates the title to move up to junior welterweight.
14	Terry Flanagan (def. Jose Zepeda)	11 Jul 2015 – 26 Oct 2017	5
Flanagan vacated the title to move up to junior welterweight.
15	Ray Beltrán (def. Paulus Moses)	16 Feb – 25 Aug 2018	0
16	José Pedraza	25 Aug – 8 Dec 2018	0
17	Vasiliy Lomachenko	8 Dec 2018 – Oct 2020	2
18	Teofimo Lopez	17 Oct 2020 – 27 Nov 2021	0
19	George Kambosos Jr.	27 Nov 2021 – 5 Jun 2022	0
20	Devin Haney	5 Jun 2022 – 29 Nov 2023	2
Haney vacated the title to move up to junior welterweight.
21	Denys Berinchyk (def. Emanuel Navarrete)	18 May 2024 – 14 Feb 2025	0
22	Keyshawn Davis	14 Feb – 6 Jun 2025	0
Davis is stripped of the title for missing weight in his mandatory bout.
23	Abdullah Mason (def. Sam Noakes)	22 Nov 2025 – present	1

== Junior lightweight ==
No.	Name	Reign	Defenses
1	John John Molina (def. Juan Laporte)	29 Apr – 15 Oct 1989	0
Molina was stripped the title after fighting for the IBF title.
2	Kamel Bou Ali (def. Antonio Rivera)	9 Dec 1989 – 21 Mar 1992	2
3	Daniel Londas	21 Mar – 4 Sep 1992	0
4	Jimmi Bredahl	4 Sep 1992 – 5 Mar 1994	1
5	Oscar De La Hoya	5 Mar – 5 Jun 1994	1
De La Hoya vacated the title to move up to lightweight.
6	Regilio Tuur (def. Eugene Speed)	24 Sep 1994 – 17 Jan 1997	6
Tuur retired as the WBO junior lightweight world champion.
7	Barry Jones (def. Wilson Palacio)	19 Dec 1997 – 1998	0
Jones lost his boxing license after a brain scan found an anomaly. The WBO vacated his title before Jones regained his license.
8	Anatoly Alexandrov (def. Julien Lorcy)	16 May 1998 – 7 Aug 1999	1
9	Acelino Freitas	7 Aug 1999 – 18 Jan 2004	10
Freitas vacated the title to stay at lightweight.
10	Diego Corrales (def. Joel Casamayor)	6 Mar – 18 Jun 2004	0
Corrales vacated the title to move up to lightweight.
11	Mike Anchondo (def. Pablo Chacón)	15 Jul 2004 – 7 Apr 2005	0
Anchado was stripped of the title after failing to make weight the day before his scheduled bout against Jorge Rodrigo Barrios.
12	Jorge Rodrigo Barrios (def. Mike Anchondo)	8 Apr 2005 – 15 Sep 2006	2
Barrios was stripped of the title after failing to make weight the day before his scheduled bout against Joan Guzmán.
13	Joan Guzmán (def. Jorge Rodrigo Barrios)	16 Sep 2006 – 14 May 2008	2
Guzmán vacated the title to move up to lightweight after continued difficulties negotiating a bout against mandatory challenger Alex Arthur.
14	Alex Arthur (interim champion promoted)	14 May – 9 Sep 2008	0
15	Nicky Cook	9 Sep 2008 – 14 Mar 2009	0
16	Román Martínez	14 Mar 2009 – 4 Sep 2010	2
17	Ricky Burns	4 Sep 2010 – 13 Sep 2011	3
Burns vacated the title to move up to lightweight.
18	Adrien Broner (def. Vicente Martín Rodríguez)	26 Nov 2011 – 20 Jul 2012	1
Broner was stripped of the title after failing to make weight the day before his scheduled bout against mandatory challenger Vicente Escobedo.
19	Román Martínez (2) (def. Miguel Beltrán Jr.)	15 Sep 2012 – 9 Nov 2013	2
20	Mikey Garcia	9 Nov 2013 – 14 Oct 2014	1
Garcia vacates the title to move up to junior welterweight.
21	Orlando Salido (interim champion promoted)	14 Oct 2014 – 11 Apr 2015	0
22	Román Martínez (3)	11 Apr 2015 – 11 Jun 2016	1
23	Vasiliy Lomachenko	11 Jun 2016 – 23 May 2018	4
Lomachenko vacated the title after moving up in weight and defeating Jorge Linares for the WBA lightweight world championship.
24	Masayuki Ito (def. Christopher Díaz)	28 Jul 2018 – 25 May 2019	1
25	Jamel Herring	25 May 2019 – 23 Oct 2021	3
26	Shakur Stevenson	23 Oct 2021 – 22 Sep 2022	1
Stevenson was stripped of the title after missing weight in his fight against mandatory challenger Robson Conceição.
27	Emanuel Navarrete (def. Liam Wilson)	3 Feb 2023 – 24 Oct 2026	5
28	O'Shaquie Foster	24 Oct 2026 – present	0

== Featherweight ==
No.	Name	Reign	Defenses
1	Maurizio Stecca (def. Pedro Nolasco)	28 Jan – 11 Nov 1989	1
2	Louie Espinoza	11 Nov 1989 – 7 Apr 1990	0
3	Jorge Páez	7 Apr 1990 – 16 Jan 1991	1
Paez vacates the title to move up to junior lightweight.
4	Maurizio Stecca (2) (def. Armando Juan Reyes)	26 Jan 1991 – 16 Feb 1992	2
5	Colin McMillan	16 Feb – 26 Sep 1992	0
6	Rubén Darío Palacio	26 Sep 1992 – 16 Apr 1993	0
Palacio was stripped of the title after failing a pre-fight medical examination due to testing positive for HIV.
7	Steve Robinson (def. John Davison)	17 Apr 1993 – 30 Sep 1995	7
8	Naseem Hamed	30 Sep 1995 – 5 Oct 2000	15
Hamed vacated the title after HBO refused to approve mandatory challenger István Kovács as his opponent.
9	István Kovács (def. Antonio Díaz)	27 Jan – 16 Jun 2001	0
10	Pablo Chacón	16 Jun 2001 – 19 Oct 2002	2
11	Scott Harrison	19 Oct 2002 – 12 Jul 2003	2
12	Manuel Medina	12 Jul – 29 Nov 2003	0
13	Scott Harrison (2)	29 Nov 2003 – 6 Dec 2006	6
Harrison vacated the title after withdrawing from a bout against Nicky Cook because he could no longer make the featherweight limit.
14	Juan Manuel Márquez (interim champion promoted)	6 Dec 2006 – 3 Apr 2007	0
Márquez vacated the title to stay at junior lightweight.
15	Steven Luevano (def. Nicky Cook)	14 Jul 2007 – 23 Jan 2010	5
16	Juan Manuel López	23 Jan 2010 – 16 Apr 2011	1
17	Orlando Salido	16 Apr 2011 – 19 Jan 2013	2
18	Mikey Garcia	19 Jan – 14 Jun 2013	0
Garcia was stripped of the title after failing to make weight the day before his scheduled bout against Juan Manuel López.
19	Orlando Salido (2) (def. Orlando Cruz)	12 Oct 2013 – 28 Feb 2014	0
Salido was stripped of the title after failing to make weight the day before his scheduled bout against Vasiliy Lomachenko.
20	Vasiliy Lomachenko (def. Gary Russell Jr.)	21 Jun 2014 – 21 Jul 2016	3
Lomachenko vacated the title to stay at junior lightweight.
21	Óscar Valdez (def. Matías Rueda)	23 Jul 2016 – 2 Aug 2019	6
Valdez vacates the title to move up to junior lightweight.
22	Shakur Stevenson (def. Joet Gonzalez)	26 Oct 2019 – 7 Jul 2020	0
Stevenson vacated the title to move up to junior lightweight.
23	Emanuel Navarrete (def. Ruben Villa)	9 Oct 2020 – 9 Feb 2023	3
Navarrete vacated the title to stay at junior lightweight.
24	Robeisy Ramírez (def. Isaac Dogboe)	1 Apr – 9 Dec 2023	1
25	Rafael Espinoza	9 Dec 2023 – present	5

== Junior featherweight ==
No.	Name	Reign	Defenses
1	Kenny Mitchell (def. Julio Gervacio)	29 Apr – 9 Dec 1989	1
2	Valerio Nati	9 Dec 1989 – 12 May 1990	0
3	Orlando Fernandez	12 May 1990 – 24 May 1991	0
4	Jesse Benavides	24 May 1991 – 15 Oct 1992	1
5	Duke McKenzie	15 Oct 1992 – 9 Jun 1993	0
6	Daniel Jiménez	9 Jun 1993 – 31 Mar 1995	4
7	Marco Antonio Barrera	31 Mar 1995 – 22 Nov 1996	8
8	Junior Jones	22 Nov 1996 – 18 Apr 1997	1
9	Kennedy McKinney	18 April 1997 – 30 May 1998	0
McKinney vacated the title to challenge WBO featherweight champion Naseem Hamed however, the fight was cancelled after Hamed suffered an injury to his right hand during training.
10	Marco Antonio Barrera (2) (def. Richie Wenton)	31 Oct 1998 – 19 Feb 2000	2
11	Erik Morales	19 Feb – 24 Feb 2000	0
Morales was stripped of the title after the WBO committee disagreed with the scorecards in his bout against Barrera. Barrera was also reinstated as the champion.
12	Marco Antonio Barrera (3) (reinstated)	24 Feb 2000 – 1 Jun 2001	2
Barrera vacated the title to stay at featherweight.
13	Agapito Sánchez (def. Jorge Monsalvo)	23 Jun 2001 – 13 Aug 2002	1
Sánchez is stripped of the title for failing a pre-fight eye test.
14	Joan Guzmán (def. Fabio Daniel Oliva)	17 Aug 2002 – 4 Jul 2005	2
Guzmán vacated the title to move up to featherweight.
15	Daniel Ponce de León (def. Sod Looknongyangtoy)	29 Oct 2005 – 7 Jun 2008	6
16	Juan Manuel López	7 Jun 2008 – Jan 2010	5
López vacated the title to move up to featherweight.
17	Wilfredo Vázquez Jr. (def. Marvin Sonsona)	27 Feb 2010 –7 May 2011	2
18	Jorge Arce	7 May – 18 Nov 2011	1
Arce vacated the title to move down to bantamweight.
19	Nonito Donaire (def. Wilfredo Vázquez Jr.)	4 Feb 2012 – 13 Apr 2013	3
20	Guillermo Rigondeaux	13 Apr 2013 – 28 Oct 2015	3
Rigondeaux was stripped of the title due to inactivity.
21	Nonito Donaire (2) (def. César Juárez)	11 Dec 2015 – 5 Nov 2016	1
22	Jessie Magdaleno	5 Nov 2016 – 28 Apr 2018	1
23	Isaac Dogboe	28 Apr – 8 Dec 2018	1
24	Emanuel Navarrete	8 Dec 2018 – 11 Jul 2020	5
Navarrete vacated the title to move up to featherweight.
25	Angelo Leo (def. Tramaine Williams)	1 Aug 2020 – 23 Jan 2021	0
26	Stephen Fulton	23 Jan 2021 – 25 Jul 2023	2
27	Naoya Inoue	25 Jul 2023 – present	8

== Bantamweight ==
No.	Name	Reign	Defenses
1	Israel Contreras (def. Maurizio Lupino)	3 Feb 1989 – 20 Feb 1991	1
Contreras vacated the title in order to challenge Luisito Espinosa for the WBA title.
2	Gaby Canizales (def. Miguel Lora)	12 Mar – 30 Jun 1991	0
3	Duke McKenzie	30 Jun 1991 – 13 May 1992	2
4	Rafael del Valle	13 May 1992 – 30 Jul 1994	2
5	Alfred Kotey	30 Jul 1994 – 21 Oct 1995	2
6	Daniel Jiménez	21 Oct 1995 – 26 Apr 1996	1
7	Robbie Regan	26 Apr 1996 – 18 Jul 1997	0
Regan vacated the title due to health problems.
8	Jorge Eliécer Julio (def. Oscar Maldonado)	28 Jul 1997 – 8 Jan 2000	3
9	Johnny Tapia	8 Jan – 16 Aug 2000	1
Tapia vacated the title to fight Paulie Ayala at junior featherweight.
10	Mauricio Martínez (def. Lester Fuentes)	4 Sep 2000 – 15 Mar 2002	1
11	Cruz Carbajal	15 Mar 2002 – 7 May 2004	2
12	Ratanachai Sor Vorapin	7 May 2004 – 29 Oct 2005	1
13	Jhonny González	29 Oct 2005 – 11 Aug 2007	1
14	Gerry Peñalosa	11 Aug 2007 – 25 Apr 2009	1
Peñalosa was stripped of the title after moving up and challenging WBO junior featherweight champion Juan Manuel López.
15	Fernando Montiel (interim champion promoted)	25 Apr 2009 – 19 Feb 2011	2
16	Nonito Donaire	19 Feb – 22 Oct 2011	1
Donaire vacates the title to move up to junior featherweight.
17	Jorge Arce (def. Angky Angkotta)	26 Nov 2011 – 15 Aug 2012	0
Arce intends to stay at junior featherweight. The title is vacated on WBO's August 2012 rankings.
18	Pungluang Sor Singyu (def. A. J. Banal)	20 Oct 2012 – 2 Mar 2013	0
19	Paulus Ambunda	2 Mar – 1 Aug 2013	0
20	Tomoki Kameda	1 Aug 2013 – 23 Apr 2015	3
Kameda's request to make his fight with Jamie McDonnell a unification bout was rejected by the WBO as McDonnell was only the "regular" champion which is considered a secondary title by the WBO. As a result, Kameda relinquished his title.
21	Pungluang Sor Singyu (2) (def. Ryo Akaho)	8 Aug 2015 – 27 Jul 2016	1
22	Marlon Tapales	27 Jul 2016 – 22 Apr 2017	0
Tapales was stripped of the title after failing to make weight the day before his bout against Shohei Omori.
23	Zolani Tete (interim champion promoted)	23 Apr 2017 – 30 Nov 2019	3
24	John Riel Casimero	30 Nov 2019 – 3 May 2022	2
Casimero was stripped of the title after the fight with his mandatory challenger, Paul Butler got cancelled for the second time. According to the British Boxing Board of Control, the fight was called off due to Casimero cutting too much weight and using a sauna prior to the weigh-ins.
25	Paul Butler (interim champion promoted)	3 May – 13 Dec 2022	0
26	Naoya Inoue	13 Dec 2022 – 13 Jan 2023	0
Inoue vacated the title in order to move up to junior featherweight.
27	Jason Moloney (def. Vincent Astrolabio)	13 May 2023 – 6 May 2024	1
28	Yoshiki Takei	6 May 2024 – 14 Sep 2025	2
29	Christian Medina	14 Sep 2025 – present	1

== Junior bantamweight ==
No.	Name	Reign	Defenses
1	José Ruíz Matos (def. Bebis Rojas)	29 Apr 1989 – 22 Feb 1992	4
2	José Quirino	22 Feb – 4 Sep 1992	0
3	Johnny Bredahl	4 Sep 1992 – 16 Jul 1994	3
Bredahl was stripped of the title.
4	Johnny Tapia (def. Henry Martínez)	14 Oct 1994 – Dec 1998	13
Tapia vacates the title to move up to bantamweight.
5	Victor Godoi (interim champion promoted)	Dec 1998 – 7 Jun 1999	0
6	Diego Morales	7 Jun – 20 Nov 1999	1
7	Adonis Rivas	20 Nov 1999 – 16 Jun 2001	2
8	Pedro Alcázar	16 Jun 2001 – 22 Jun 2002	1
9	Fernando Montiel	22 Jun 2002 – 16 Aug 2003	1
10	Mark Johnson	16 Aug 2003 – 25 Sep 2004	1
11	Iván Hernández	25 Sep 2004 – 9 Apr 2005	0
12	Fernando Montiel (2)	9 Apr 2005 – 10 Feb 2009	6
Montiel reportedly was open in fighting Vic Darchinyan for the undisputed championship however, on the following day, Montiel's title was reportedly vacated.
13	José López (def. Pramuansak Posuwan)	28 Mar – 4 Sep 2009	0
14	Marvin Sonsona	4 Sep – 20 Nov 2009	0
Sonsona was stripped of the title after failing to make weight on the day of his bout against Alejandro Hernández.
15	Jorge Arce (def. Angky Angkotta)	30 Jan – Apr 2010	0
Arce vacates his title to move up to bantamweight.
16	Omar Narváez (def. Everth Briceño)	15 May 2010 – 30 Dec 2014	11
17	Naoya Inoue	30 Dec 2014 – 6 Mar 2018	7
Inoue vacates the title to move up to bantamweight.
18	Donnie Nietes (def. Kazuto Ioka)	31 Dec 2018 – 28 Feb 2019	0
Nietes vacates the title to pursue a career-defining fight.
19	Kazuto Ioka (def. Aston Palicte)	19 Jun 2019 – 15 Feb 2023	6
Ioka vacates the title to pursue a rematch with Joshua Franco.
20	Junto Nakatani (def. Andrew Moloney)	20 May – 13 Dec 2023	1
Nakatani vacates the title to move up to bantamweight.
21	Kosei Tanaka (def. Christian Bacasegua)	24 Feb – 14 Oct 2024	0
22	Phumelele Cafu	14 Oct 2024 – 19 Jul 2025	0
23	Jesse Rodriguez	19 Jul 2025 – 10 Jun 2026	1
Rodriguez vacates the title to move up to bantamweight.
24	Kenshiro Teraji (def. Israel González)	20 Jul 2026 – present	0

== Flyweight ==
No.	Name	Reign	Defenses
1	Elvis Álvarez (def. Miguel Mercedes)	3 Mar 1989 – Mar 1990	0
Álvarez vacates the title due to lack of interest in it.
2	Isidro Pérez (def. Angel Rosario)	18 Aug 1990 – 18 Mar 1992	2
3	Pat Clinton	18 Mar 1992 – 15 May 1993	1
4	Jacob Matlala	15 May 1993 – 11 Feb 1995	3
5	Alberto Jiménez	11 Feb 1995 – 13 Dec 1996	5
6	Carlos Gabriel Salazar	13 Dec 1996 – 14 Aug 1998	5
7	Rubén Sánchez León	14 Aug 1998 – 23 Apr 1999	1
8	José Antonio López Bueno	23 Apr 1999 – 1999	1
Bueno vacates the title due to an ankle injury thus preventing him from defending the title.
9	Isidro García (def. José López)	18 Dec 1999 – 15 Dec 2000	1
10	Fernando Montiel	15 Dec 2000 – 22 Jun 2002	3
Montiel's title was vacated when he stepped on the ring against Pedro Alcázar for his WBO junior bantamweight title.
11	Adonis Rivas (interim champion promoted)	22 Jun – 13 Jul 2002	0
12	Omar Narváez	13 Jul 2002 – 14 May 2010	16
Narváez vacates the title to move up to junior bantamweight.
13	Julio César Miranda (def. Richie Mepranum)	12 Jun 2010 – 16 Jul 2011	3
14	Brian Viloria	16 Jul 2011 – 6 Apr 2013	3
15	Juan Francisco Estrada	6 Apr 2013 – 14 Sep 2016	5
Estrada vacates the title to move up to junior bantamweight.
16	Zou Shiming (def. Prasitsak Phaprom)	5 Nov 2016 – 28 Jul 2017	0
17	Sho Kimura	28 Jul 2017 – 24 Sep 2018	2
18	Kosei Tanaka	24 Sep 2018 – 31 Jan 2020	3
Tanaka vacates the title to move up to junior bantamweight.
19	Junto Nakatani (def. Giemel Magramo)	6 Nov 2020 – 27 Oct 2022	2
Nakatani vacates the title to move up to junior bantamweight.
20	Jesse Rodriguez (def. Christian Gonzalez)	8 Apr 2023 – 29 Mar 2024	1
Rodriguez vacates the title to move up to junior bantamweight.
21	Anthony Olascuaga (def. Riku Kano)	20 Jul 2024 – present	6

== Junior flyweight ==
No.	Name	Reign	Defenses
1	José de Jesús (def. Fernando Martínez)	19 May 1989 – Mar 1992	3
de Jesús was stripped of the title after failing to defend it in a specific time period.
2	Josué Camacho (def. Eddie Vallejo)	31 Jul 1992 – 15 Jul 1994	1
3	Michael Carbajal	15 Jul – 12 Nov 1994	0
Carbajal is stripped of the title for failing to defend the title.
4	Paul Weir (def. Paul Oulden)	23 Nov 1994 – 18 Nov 1995	1
5	Jacob Matlala	18 Nov 1995 – 1997	2
Matlala vacates the title to fight Michael Carbajal rather than defend his title.
6	Jesús Chong (def. Eric Griffin)	31 May – 25 Aug 1997	0
7	Melchor Cob Castro	25 Aug 1997 – 17 Jan 1998	0
8	Juan Domingo Córdoba	17 Jan – 5 Dec 1998	1
9	Jorge Arce	5 Dec 1998 – 31 Jul 1999	1
10	Michael Carbajal (2)	31 Jul – Aug 1999	0
Carbajal retires.
11	Masibulele Makepula (def. Jacob Matlala)	19 Feb 2000 – 2000	0
Makepula vacates the title to move up to flyweight.
12	Nelson Dieppa (def. Andy Tabanas)	14 Apr 2001 – 30 Apr 2005	5
13	Hugo Cázares	30 Apr 2005 – 25 Aug 2007	4
14	Iván Calderón	25 Aug 2007 – 28 Aug 2010	6
15	Giovani Segura	28 Aug 2010 – 22 Apr 2011	1
Segura vacates the title to move up to flyweight.
16	Jesús Géles (interim champion promoted)	22 Apr – 30 Apr 2011	0
17	Ramón García Hirales	30 Apr – 8 Oct 2011	0
18	Donnie Nietes	8 Oct 2011 – 3 Aug 2016	9
Nietes vacates the title to move up to flyweight.
19	Kosei Tanaka (def. Moisés Fuentes)	31 Dec 2016 – 30 Nov 2017	2
Tanaka vacates the title to move up to flyweight.
20	Ángel Acosta (def. Juan Alejo)	2 Dec 2017 – 21 Jun 2019	3
21	Elwin Soto	21 Jun 2019 – 16 Oct 2021	3
22	Jonathan González	16 Oct 2021 – 19 Jun 2024	3
González vacates the title to move up to flyweight.
23	Shokichi Iwata (def. Jairo Noriega)	13 Oct 2024 – 13 Mar 2025	0
24	René Santiago	13 Mar 2025 – present	2

== Mini flyweight ==
No.	Name	Reign	Defenses
1	Rafael Torres (def. Yamil Caraballo)	30 Aug 1989 – 1993	1
Torres vacates the title.
2	Paul Weir (def. Fernando Martínez)	15 May – 16 Dec 1993	1
Weir vacates the title to move up in weight and challenge Josué Camacho for a junior flyweight world title.
4	Alex Sánchez (def. Orlando Malone)	22 Dec 1993 – 23 Aug 1997	6
4	Ricardo López	23 Aug – Aug 1997	0
After winning the title, López was stripped of the title after he stated that he would give the championship belt to his father. The WBO president at that time deemed it as a "public resignation".
5	Eric Jamili (def. Mickey Cantwell)	19 Dec 1997 – 30 May 1998	0
6	Kermin Guardia	30 May 1998 – 2001	3
Guardia vacates the title to move up to junior flyweight.
7	Jorge Mata (def. Reynaldo Frutos)	29 Jun 2002 – 28 Mar 2003	1
8	Eduardo Ray Márquez	28 Mar – 3 May 2003	0
9	Iván Calderón	3 May 2003 – 25 Aug 2007	11
Calderón's title is vacated when he won the WBO junior flyweight title.
10	Donnie Nietes (def. Pornsawan Porpramook)	30 Sep 2007 – 28 Feb 2011	4
Nietes vacates the title to move up in weight and challenge Ramón García Hirales for the WBO junior flyweight title.
11	Raúl García (interim champion promoted)	28 Feb – 27 Aug 2011	1
12	Moisés Fuentes	27 Aug 2011 – 19 Apr 2013	2
Fuentes vacates the title to move up to junior flyweight.
13	Merlito Sabillo (interim champion promoted)	19 Apr 2013 – 22 Mar 2014	2
14	Francisco Rodríguez Jr.	22 Mar – 15 Dec 2014	1
Rodríguez intends to move in weight class. The title is vacated on WBO's December 2014 rankings.
15	Katsunari Takayama (def. Go Odaira)	31 Dec 2014 – 3 Mar 2015	0
Takayama vacates his WBO title to skip his mandatory challenger in favor of a fight with former champion Fahlan Sakkreerin.
16	Kosei Tanaka (def. Julián Yedras)	30 May 2015 – 7 Apr 2016	1
Tanaka vacates the title to move up to junior flyweight.
17	Katsunari Takayama (2) (def. Riku Kano)	20 Aug 2016 – 3 Apr 2017	0
Takayama retired from professional boxing in order to concentrate on training for the 2020 Summer Olympics. Interim champion Fukura is later promoted to full champion.
18	Tatsuya Fukuhara (interim champion promoted)	14 Apr – 27 Aug 2017	0
19	Ryuya Yamanaka	27 Aug 2017 – 13 Jul 2018	1
20	Vic Saludar	13 Jul 2018 – 24 Aug 2019	1
21	Wilfredo Méndez	24 Aug 2019 – 14 Dec 2021	2
22	Masataka Taniguchi	14 Dec 2021 – 6 Jan 2023	1
23	Melvin Jerusalem	6 Jan – 27 May 2023	0
24	Oscar Collazo	27 May 2023 – 2 Nov 2026	7
Collazo vacated the title.
25	Ryūsei Matsumoto (interim champion promoted)	2 Nov 2026 – present	0

== See also ==
- List of current world boxing champions
- List of undisputed boxing champions
- List of WBA world champions
- List of WBC world champions
- List of IBF world champions
- List of The Ring world champions
- List of NYSAC world champions
- List of WBO female world champions
- List of IBO world champions
