= Diego Morales (boxer) =

Mexican boxer (born 1979)

Personal information
- Nickname: Pelucho
- Born: Diego Adán Morales; December 11, 1979 (age 46) Tijuana, Mexico
- Height: 5 ft 5 in (1.65 m)
- Weight: Lightweight

Boxing career
- Stance: Southpaw

Boxing record
- Total fights: 39
- Wins: 37
- Win by KO: 27
- Losses: 2

Diego Adán Morales (born December 11, 1979, in Tijuana, Mexico) is a Mexican former professional boxer who held the WBO super flyweight title in 1999. He is the younger sibling of Érik Morales.

== Professional boxing record ==
39 fights	37 wins	2 losses
By knockout	27	0
By decision	10	1
By disqualification	0	1

No.	Result	Record	Opponent	Type	Round, time	Date	Location	Notes
39	Win	37–2	Guadalupe Arce	TKO	4 (6), 2:18	10 Aug 2007	Polideportivo Centenario, Los Mochis, Mexico	
38	Win	36–2	Len Martinez	TKO	1 (10), 2:57	29 Oct 2005	Dodge Arena, Hidalgo, Texas, U.S.	
37	Win	35–2	Alberto Ontiveros	UD	10	14 Apr 2005	HP Pavilion, San Jose, California, U.S.	
36	Win	34–2	Alvaro Muro	TKO	6 (10), 2:22	22 Nov 2004	Auditorio Municipal, Tijuana, Mexico	
35	Win	33–2	Phillip Payne	UD	10	24 Sep 2004	Will Rogers Coliseum, Fort Worth, Texas, U.S.	
34	Win	32–2	Adonis Rivas	UD	12	27 March 2004	Auditorio Municipal, Tijuana, Mexico	
33	Win	31–2	Evangelio Pérez	TD	6 (10)	22 Nov 2003	Centro de Espectáculos Alamar, Tijuana, Mexico	
32	Win	30–2	Pablo Osuna	UD	10	31 May 2003	Auditorio Municipal, Tijuana, Mexico	
31	Win	29–2	Pedro Mora	KO	6 (10)	16 Dec 2002	Auditorio Municipal, Tijuana, Mexico	
30	Win	28–2	Cuauhtémoc Gomez	TKO	5 (10)	7 Oct 2002	Auditorio Municipal, Tijuana, Mexico	
29	Loss	27–2	Fernando Velardez	DQ	9 (12)	5 Apr 2002	Auditorio Municipal, Tijuana, Mexico	For USBA super bantamweight title
28	Win	27–1	Terry Evans	TKO	5 (10)	7 Dec 2001	Frontón Palacio Jai Alai, Tijuana, Mexico	
27	Win	26–1	Felipe Ramírez	KO	2 (10), 2:30	9 Sep 2001	Soboba Casino, San Jacinto, California, U.S.	
26	Win	25–1	Francisco Tejedor	UD	10	11 Mar 2001	Lucky Star Casino, Concho, Oklahoma, U.S.	
25	Win	24–1	Julio Cesar Cardona	KO	4 (8), 2:52	29 Nov 1996	Pepsi Arena, Chula Vista, California, U.S.	
24	Win	23–1	Len Martinez	TKO	7 (8), 0:34	1 Oct 2000	Celebrity Theatre, Phoenix, Arizona, U.S.	
23	Win	22–1	Carmelo Caceres	KO	7 (10)	26 May 2000	Tijuana, Mexico	Won WBC Youth bantamweight title
22	Win	21–1	David Burgos	TKO	2 (10)	7 Apr 2000	Auditorio Municipal, Tijuana, Mexico	
21	Win	20–1	Miguel Martínez	KO	1 (6)	11 Mar 2000	Fantasy Springs Resort Casino, Indio, California, U.S.	
20	Loss	19–1	Adonis Rivas	UD	12	20 Nov 1999	Hard Rock Hotel and Casino, Paradise, Nevada, U.S.	Lost WBO super flyweight title
19	Win	19–0	Ysaias Zamudio	TKO	9 (12), 0:15	31 Jul 1999	Plaza de Toros El Toreo, Tijuana, Mexico	Retained WBO super flyweight title
18	Win	18–0	Victor Godoi	RTD	11 (12), 0:01	7 Jun 1999	Auditorio Municipal, Tijuana, Mexico	Won WBO super flyweight title
17	Win	17–0	Manuel Barreto	PTS	6	18 Dec 1998	Mexico	
16	Win	16–0	Osvaldo Valenzuela	KO	4 (6), 1:48	12 Sep 1998	Plaza de Toros, Tijuana, Mexico	
15	Win	15–0	Julio César García	PTS	6	31 May 1998	Tijuana, Mexico	
14	Win	14–0	Fernando Espinosa Mendoza	KO	1 (?)	3 Apr 1998	Auditorio Municipal, Tijuana, Mexico	
13	Win	13–0	Roberto Muñoz	KO	1 (?)	2 Mar 1998	Tijuana, Mexico	
12	Win	12–0	Ventura Mendivil	KO	1 (6)	12 Dec 1997	Auditorio Municipal, Tijuana, Mexico	
11	Win	11–0	Andrés Ferrer	KO	4 (?)	15 Nov 1997	Mexico	
10	Win	10–0	César Rodríguez	PTS	6	17 Oct 1997	Tijuana, Mexico	
9	Win	9–0	Angel Eduardo Mata	SD	4	21 Jul 1997	Grand Hotel, Tijuana, Mexico	
8	Win	8–0	Juventino Delgado	KO	1 (?)	26 Jun 1997	Grand Hotel, Tijuana, Mexico	
7	Win	7–0	Trinidad Valenzuela	KO	2 (?)	26 May 1997	Tijuana, Mexico	
6	Win	6–0	Alfonso García	KO	1 (?)	21 Mar 1997	Tijuana, Mexico	
5	Win	5–0	Francisco Penuelas	KO	2 (?)	21 Feb 1997	Tijuana, Mexico	
4	Win	4–0	Antonio Valencia	KO	2 (?)	3 Feb 1997	Tijuana, Mexico	
3	Win	3–0	Joaquín Acosta	KO	1 (?)	9 Dec 1996	Tijuana, Mexico	
2	Win	2–0	Gabriel Martínez	KO	3 (?)	4 Nov 1996	Tijuana, Mexico	
1	Win	1–0	Sergio Vilez	TKO	1 (4)	30 Sep 1996	Tijuana, Mexico	

== See also ==
- Notable boxing families
- List of Mexican boxing world champions

Preceded by Victor Godoi	WBO Super Flyweight Champion; 7 Jun 1999 – 20 Nov 1999	Succeeded by Adonis Rivas
