= Mark Johnson (boxer) =

American boxer (born 1971)

Personal information
- Nickname: Too Sharp
- Born: Marcellus Joseph Johnson; August 13, 1971 (age 55) Washington, D.C., U.S.
- Height: 5 ft 3 in (160 cm)
- Weight: Flyweight; Super flyweight; Bantamweight

Boxing career
- Reach: 63 in (160 cm)
- Stance: Southpaw

Boxing record
- Total fights: 50
- Wins: 44
- Win by KO: 28
- Losses: 5
- No contests: 1

Marcellus Joseph Johnson (born August 13, 1971), better known as Mark "Too Sharp" Johnson, is an American former professional boxer who competed from 1990 to 2006. He is a three-time world champion in two weight classes, having held the International Boxing Federation (IBF) flyweight title from 1996 to 1999; the IBF junior-bantamweight title from 1999 to 2000; and the World Boxing Organization (WBO) junior-bantamweight title from 2003 to 2004.

A fast and skilled southpaw, Johnson reached a peak Ring magazine pound for pound ranking of fifth in 1998, and is the first African-American boxer to win a flyweight world title. In 2012 he was inducted into the International Boxing Hall of Fame.

== Amateur career ==
Johnson was an amateur standout, winning the 1989 U.S. national championships at light flyweight.

== Professional career ==
=== Flyweight ===
Johnson, defeated Francisco Tejedor to win the IBF Flyweight title in 1996. Although he never attained significant popularity due to his weight class and lack of defining fights, he went on to become one of the top pound for pound fighters in boxing for several years. Johnson conceded in a 2001 interview that his decision to manage his career independently during his peak, rather than signing with an established promoter, contributed to his inability to secure high-profile fights, "I realized I had to have some management like a Don King or a Bob Arum or a [Lou] Duva to get these fights."

=== Junior Bantamweight ===
Johnson defended that crown seven times until April 1999, when he rose to win the IBF's junior-bantamweight crown with a unanimous decision over Ratanachai Sor Vorapin at Washington, D.C.'s MCI Center (now the Capital One Arena). He defended the junior-bantamweight title twice. However, his career was interrupted when he was sentenced to a year in prison on a drug related parole violation as well as domestic assault charges involving his wife. While incarcerated, he was stripped of his IBF title due to inactivity.

=== Bantamweight ===
Johnson returned to the ring in 2001, scoring two consecutive wins. In his third fight at bantamweight Johnson lost in an upset to up and coming Rafael Marquez by split decision over 10 rounds later that year. This bout was clouded by the fact that Johnson was docked two points for holding. In the rematch the following year, Marquez took Johnson apart, winning by TKO in the 8th round. In 2003, Johnson upset WBO junior-bantamweight champion Fernando Montiel. Johnson defended that title once before losing by knockout in the 8th round to Ivan Hernández. Johnson retired following his second straight loss in February 2006 after falling by eighth-round knockout to current WBC featherweight titleholder Jhonny González.

== Professional boxing record ==
50 fights	44 wins	5 losses
By knockout	28	3
By decision	16	2
No contests	1	

No.	Result	Record	Opponent	Type	Round, time	Date	Location	Notes
50	Loss	44–5 (1)	Jhonny González	KO	8 (12), 1:08	Feb 25, 2006	Mandalay Bay Events Center, Paradise, Nevada, U.S.	
49	Loss	44–4 (1)	Iván Hernández	KO	8 (12), 2:42	Sep 25, 2004	FedExForum, Memphis, Tennessee, U.S.	Lost WBO junior bantamweight title
48	Win	44–3 (1)	Paulino Villalobos	UD	10	Jul 17, 2004	Prince George's Stadium, Bowie, Maryland, U.S.	
47	Win	43–3 (1)	Luis Bolano	KO	4 (12), 2:40	Mar 6, 2004	Foxwoods Resort Casino, Ledyard, Connecticut, U.S.	Retained WBO junior bantamweight title
46	Win	42–3 (1)	Fernando Montiel	MD	12	Aug 16, 2003	Mohegan Sun Arena, Montville, Connecticut, U.S.	Won vacant WBO junior-bantamweight title
45	Win	41–3 (1)	Ricardo Medina	UD	8	Jun 28, 2003	D.C. Armory, Washington, D.C., U.S.	
44	Loss	40–3 (1)	Rafael Márquez	TKO	8 (12), 2:41	Feb 23, 2002	Mandalay Bay Events Center, Paradise, Nevada, U.S.	For vacant USBA bantamweight title
43	Loss	40–2 (1)	Rafael Márquez	SD	10	Oct 6, 2001	Memorial Coliseum, Corpus Christi, Texas, U.S.	
42	Win	40–1 (1)	Arturo Valenzuela	TKO	6 (10), 0:20	Jul 24, 2001	Chene Park, Detroit, Michigan, U.S.	
41	Win	39–1 (1)	Sergio Perez	UD	10	Jun 8, 2001	Ho-Chunk Casino, Delton, Wisconsin, U.S.	
40	NC	38–1 (1)	Raul Juarez	NC	4 (12), 2:14	Nov 19, 1999	D.C. Armory, Washington, D.C., U.S.	IBF junior-bantamweight title at stake; NC after Juarez could not continue from an intentional low blow
39	Win	38–1	Jorge Lacierva	TD	8 (12), 2:07	Aug 13, 1999	Foxwoods Resort Casino, Ledyard, Connecticut, U.S.	Retained IBF junior-bantamweight title; Unanimous TD after Lacierva was cut from an accidental head clash
38	Win	37–1	Ratanachai Sor Vorapin	UD	12	Apr 24, 1999	MCI Center, Washington, D.C., U.S.	Won vacant IBF junior-bantamweight title
37	Win	36–1	José Laureano	TKO	6 (12), 3:00	Sep 4, 1998	Etess Arena, Atlantic City, New Jersey, U.S.	Retained IBF flyweight title
36	Win	35–1	Luis Rolon	UD	12	Jul 26, 1998	Turning Stone Resort Casino, Verona, New York, U.S.	Retained IBF flyweight title
35	Win	34–1	Arthur Johnson	KO	1 (12), 1:11	Feb 22, 1998	D.C. Armory, Washington, D.C., U.S.	Retained IBF flyweight title
34	Win	33–1	Angel Almena	UD	12	Sep 16, 1997	Municipal Auditorium, Nashville, Tennessee, U.S.	Retained IBF flyweight title
33	Win	32–1	Cecilio Espino	KO	2 (12), 3:00	Jun 1, 1997	Mohegan Sun Arena, Montville, Connecticut, U.S.	Retained IBF flyweight title
32	Win	31–1	Alejandro Montiel	UD	12	Feb 10, 1997	Great Western Forum, Inglewood, California, U.S.	Retained IBF flyweight title
31	Win	30–1	Raul Juarez	TKO	8 (12), 1:57	Aug 5, 1996	Great Western Forum, Inglewood, California, U.S.	Retained IBF flyweight title
30	Win	29–1	Francisco Tejedor	KO	1 (12), 1:35	May 4, 1996	Arrowhead Pond, Anaheim, California, U.S.	Won vacant IBF flyweight title
29	Win	28–1	Raul Rios	KO	3 (10)	Dec 11, 1995	Great Western Forum, Inglewood, California, U.S.	
28	Win	27–1	Ernest Sneed	TKO	1	Oct 15, 1995	Washington, D.C., U.S.	
27	Win	26–1	Marcos Pacheco	TKO	4	Sep 11, 1995	Great Western Forum, Inglewood, California, U.S.	
26	Win	25–1	Josué Camacho	TKO	8 (12), 2:42	Jul 15, 1995	Great Western Forum, Inglewood, California, U.S.	Retained World Boxing Board flyweight title
25	Win	24–1	Rafael Granillo	KO	5 (12), 1:56	Jun 10, 1995	Caesars Palace, Paradise, Nevada, U.S.	Retained World Boxing Board flyweight title
24	Win	23–1	Mauro Diaz	TKO	3 (12)	Apr 24, 1995	Great Western Forum, Inglewood, California, U.S.	Retained World Boxing Board flyweight title
23	Win	22–1	Leon Salazar	RTD	3 (12), 3:00	Feb 20, 1995	Great Western Forum, Inglewood, California, U.S.	Retained World Boxing Board flyweight title
22	Win	21–1	Enrique Orozco	TKO	12 (12), 1:30	Oct 22, 1994	Caesars Palace, Paradise, Nevada, U.S.	Retained World Boxing Board flyweight title
21	Win	20–1	Jose Quirino	KO	3 (12)	Jun 11, 1994	Great Western Forum, Inglewood, California, U.S.	Retained World Boxing Board flyweight title
20	Win	19–1	Javier Juarez	KO	3 (12), 2:24	May 9, 1994	Great Western Forum, Inglewood, California, U.S.	Retained World Boxing Board flyweight title
19	Win	18–1	Ancee Gedeon	PTS	10	Apr 23, 1994	D.C. Armory, Washington, D.C., U.S.	Retained World Boxing Board flyweight title
18	Win	17–1	Eduardo Ramirez	KO	2 (12)	Mar 1, 1994	Great Western Forum, Inglewood, California, U.S.	Retained World Boxing Board flyweight title
17	Win	16–1	Roberto Betillo Alvarez	UD	12	Dec 6, 1993	Great Western Forum, Inglewood, California, U.S.	Retained World Boxing Board flyweight title
16	Win	15–1	Armando Diaz	UD	12	Aug 9, 1993	Great Western Forum, Inglewood, California, U.S.	Retained World Boxing Board flyweight title
15	Win	14–1	Alberto Jimenez	SD	12	May 18, 1993	Great Western Forum, Inglewood, California, U.S.	Won vacant World Boxing Board flyweight title
14	Win	13–1	Rudy Bradley	PTS	8	Apr 5, 1993	Great Western Forum, Inglewood, California, U.S.	
13	Win	12–1	Luis Rosario	KO	2	Feb 19, 1993	Convention Center, Washington, D.C., U.S.	
12	Win	11–1	Daniel Moran	TKO	1	Nov 29, 1992	Convention Center, Washington, D.C., U.S.	
11	Win	10–1	Raul Hernandez	KO	2	Oct 3, 1992	Washington, D.C., U.S.	
10	Win	9–1	Steve Coleman	KO	1	Jun 13, 1992	Alexandria, Virginia, U.S.	
9	Win	8–1	Aureo Dominguez	UD	6	Jan 11, 1992	Convention Center, Washington, D.C., U.S.	
8	Win	7–1	Martin Llovera	KO	2 (6)	Sep 21, 1991	Washington, D.C., U.S.	
7	Win	6–1	Joe Bordley	KO	2	Jul 24, 1991	Washington, D.C., U.S.	
6	Win	5–1	Derrick Shepherd	KO	1	May 4, 1991	Washington, D.C., U.S.	
5	Win	4–1	Derrick Shepherd	PTS	6	Mar 9, 1991	Washington, D.C., U.S.	
4	Win	3–1	Darian Riley	KO	2	Feb 26, 1991	Convention Center, Washington, D.C., U.S.	
3	Win	2–1	Wayne Johnson	KO	1	Jan 11, 1991	Washington, D.C., U.S.	
2	Loss	1–1	Richie Wenton	PTS	4	Mar 17, 1990	King's Hall, Belfast, Northern Ireland	
1	Win	1–0	Ray González	KO	3 (4)	Feb 24, 1990	Palace Theatre, Lorain, Ohio, U.S.	

== Titles in boxing ==
=== Major world titles ===
- IBF flyweight champion (112 lbs)
- IBF junior bantamweight champion (115 lbs)
- WBO junior bantamweight champion (115 lbs)

=== Minor world titles ===
- WBB flyweight champion (112 lbs)

Sporting positions
Amateur boxing titles
Previous: Michael Carbajal	U.S. light-flyweight champion 1989	Next: John Herrera
Minor world boxing titles
New title	WBB flyweight champion May 18, 1993 – October 1995; Vacated	Vacant Title next held by Rubén Sánchez León
Major world boxing titles
Vacant Title last held by Danny Romero	IBF flyweight champion May 4, 1996 – September 7, 1999; Vacated	Vacant Title next held by Irene Pacheco
Vacant Title last held by Johnny Tapia	IBF junior-bantamweight champion April 24, 1999 – February 12, 2000; Vacated	Vacant Title next held by Félix Machado
Preceded by Fernando Montiel	WBO junior-bantamweight champion August 16, 2003 – September 25, 2004	Succeeded by Ivan Hernández
