= Iván Hernández (boxer) =

Mexican boxer (born 1982)

Personal information
- Nickname: Choco
- Born: Iván Hernández Rangel; November 24, 1982 (age 43) Mexico City, Mexico
- Height: 5 ft 9 in (175 cm)
- Weight: Featherweight; Super Bantamweight; Super Flyweight

Boxing career
- Reach: 72 in (181 cm)
- Stance: Orthodox

Boxing record
- Total fights: 34
- Wins: 28
- Win by KO: 17
- Losses: 5
- Draws: 1
- No contests: 0

Iván Hernández Rangel (born November 24, 1982) is a Mexican former professional boxer who competed from 2000 to 2013. He held the WBO super flyweight title from 2004 to 2005.

== Professional career ==
In August 2001, Iván won the WBC Youth flyweight title against Juan José Beltrán.

=== WBO Super Flyweight Championship ===
At only 22 years old, Hernández won the WBO super flyweight title with an upset knockout over American Mark Johnson in FedEx Forum, Memphis, Tennessee.

He lost his Championship in his first title defense to fellow Mexican Fernando Montiel.

=== WBO Super Bantamweight Championship ===
In Hernández's next fight he lost against WBO Super Bantamweight champion Wilfredo Vazquez, Jr.

== Professional boxing record ==
37 fights	28 wins	8 losses
By knockout	18	5
By decision	10	3
Draws	1	

No.	Result	Record	Opponent	Type	Round, time	Date	Location	Notes
37	Loss	28–8–1	Mario Enrique Tinoco	KO	11 (12), 1:53	Aug 30, 2013	Gimnasio Oscar 'Tigre' García, Ensenada, Mexico	Lost Mexican featherweight title
36	Win	28–7–1	Ramon Camargo Beltrán	KO	2 (12)	Jun 28, 2013	Gimnasio Oscar 'Tigre' García, Ensenada, Mexico	Won vacant Mexican featherweight title
35	Win	27–7–1	René Ruiz	UD	10	Apr 12, 2013	Gimnasio Oscar 'Tigre' García, Ensenada, Mexico	
34	Loss	26–7–1	Joel Brunker	UD	8	Jan 30, 2013	Entertainment Cenre, Sydney, Australia	
33	Loss	26–6–1	Arturo Gutíerrez	SD	10	Sep 29, 2012	Auditorio Ernesto Rufo, Rosarito, Mexico	
32	Loss	26–5–1	Wilfredo Vázquez Jr.	TKO	11 (12), 0:50	Oct 16, 2010	Silver Spurs Arena, Kissimmee, Florida, U.S.	For WBO super bantamweight title
31	Win	26–4–1	Lisandro de los Santos	TKO	5 (10)	May 28, 2010	Gimnasio Oscar 'Tigre' García, Ensenada, Mexico	
30	Win	25–4–1	Jaime Maldonado	KO	5 (10)	Mar 26, 2010	Gimnasio Oscar 'Tigre' García, Ensenada, Mexico	
29	Loss	24–4–1	Toshiaki Nishioka	RTD	3 (12), 3:00	Oct 10, 2009	Yoyogi #2 Gymnasium, Tokyo, Japan	For WBC super bantamweight title
28	Win	24–3–1	José Alberto Mendoza	KO	3 (10)	May 30, 2009	Gimnasio Oscar 'Tigre' García, Ensenada, Mexico	
27	Win	23–3–1	Azael Loera	KO	1 (6), 0:44	Apr 10, 2009	Gimnasio Germán Evers, Mazatlán, Mexico	
26	Win	22–3–1	Anyetei Laryea	UD	8	May 15, 2008	Hyatt Regency Hotel, Irvine, California, U.S.	
25	Loss	21–3–1	José Ángel Beranza	UD	10	Dec 8, 2006	Desert Diamond Casino, Tucson, Arizona, U.S.	
24	Loss	21–2–1	Israel Vázquez	RTD	4 (12), 3:00	Jun 10, 2006	Boardwalk Hall, Atlantic City, New Jersey, U.S.	For WBC super bantamweight title
23	Win	21–1–1	Roberto Carlos Leyva	MD	12	Apr 21, 2006	Gimnasio Oscar 'Tigre' García, Ensenada, Mexico	Won vacant WBC-NABF bantamweight title
22	Win	20–1–1	César Morales	UD	10	Jul 26, 2005	W.C. Handy Pavilion, Memphis, Tennessee, U.S.	
21	Loss	19–1–1	Fernando Montiel	KO	7 (12), 1:48	Apr 9, 2005	Don Haskins Center, El Paso, Texas, U.S.	Lost WBO super flyweight title
20	Win	19–0–1	Lee Cargle	UD	8	Feb 9, 2005	Isle of Capri Casino, Lula, Mississippi, U.S.	
19	Win	18–0–1	Mark Johnson	KO	8 (12), 2:42	Sep 25, 2004	FedExForum, Memphis, Tennessee, U.S.	Won WBO super flyweight title
18	Win	17–0–1	Marcos Badillo	SD	10	Jul 16, 2004	Gimnasio Oscar 'Tigre' García, Ensenada, Mexico	
17	Win	16–0–1	Brian Garcia	TKO	3 (10), 1:49	May 28, 2004	Santa Ana Star Casino, Bernalillo, New Mexico, U.S.	
16	Win	15–0–1	Oscar Martinez	TKO	1 (6), 2:09	Apr 4, 2004	Sam's Town Casino, Tunica, Mississippi, U.S.	
15	Win	14–0–1	Arturo Davalos	UD	8	Jan 24, 2004	Sam's Town Casino, Tunica, Mississippi, U.S.	
14	Win	13–0–1	Rubén Poma	KO	1 (8)	Aug 30, 2003	Sam's Town Casino, Tunica, Mississippi, U.S.	Won vacant Mid-South flyweight title
13	Draw	12–0–1	Rafael Chávez	PTS	8	Mar 22, 2003	Monumental Plaza de Toros México, Mexico City, Mexico	
12	Win	12–0	Gabriel Muñoz	PTS	12	Apr 19, 2002	Rosarito, Mexico	Won vacant WBA Fedecentro bantamweight title
11	Win	11–0	Christian Hernández	KO	3 (10)	Dec 15, 2001	Ensenada, Mexico	Won vacant WBC Youth flyweight title
10	Win	10–0	Víctor Hernández	TKO	7 (10)	Sep 28, 2001	Gimnasio Oscar 'Tigre' García, Ensenada, Mexico	
9	Win	9–0	Felipe Acosta	KO	3	May 19, 2001	Mexico	
8	Win	8–0	Raúl Gonzales	KO	6	Apr 23, 2001	Mexico	
7	Win	7–0	Ricardo Urías	PTS	6	Dec 9, 2000	Auditorio Municipal, Tijuana, Mexico	
6	Win	6–0	Aarón Sepúlveda	KO	1	Nov 3, 2000	Ensenada, Mexico	
5	Win	5–0	Manuel Yocupisio	PTS	4	Oct 18, 2000	Mexico	
4	Win	4–0	Carlos Cota	TKO	4	Sep 2, 2000	Salon Teotihuacan, Mexicali, Mexico	
3	Win	3–0	Noé Acosta	TKO	2	Aug 4, 2000	Ensenada, Mexico	
2	Win	2–0	Ambrosio Hernández	TKO	2	May 26, 2000	Mexico	
1	Win	1–0	Indalecio Valenzuela	KO	2	Apr 7, 2000	Auditorio Municipal, Tijuana, Mexico	

== See also ==
- List of Mexican boxing world champions
- List of WBO world champions
- List of super flyweight boxing champions

Preceded by Mark Johnson	WBO Super Flyweight Champion; 25 September 2004– 9 April 2005	Succeeded by Fernando Montiel
