= Marvin Sonsona =

Filipino boxer (born 1990)

Personal information
- Nickname: Marvelous
- Nationality: Filipino
- Born: Marvin Doecadez Sonsona; July 25, 1990 (age 36) General Santos, South Cotabato, Philippines
- Height: 5 ft 7 in (170 cm)
- Weight: Flyweight; Super flyweight; Super bantamweight; Featherweight

Boxing career
- Stance: Southpaw

Boxing record
- Total fights: 24
- Wins: 22
- Win by KO: 15
- Losses: 1
- Draws: 1

Marvin Doecadez Sonsona (born July 25, 1990) is a Filipino professional boxer and former WBO super flyweight champion. A relative of his named Eden Sonsona is also a boxer and a former Philippine national bantamweight champion. One of Sonsona's trainers is Nonito Donaire Sr., father and trainer of Nonito Donaire.

== Professional career ==
Sonsona started boxing at seven years of age under the tutelage of his uncle. Before fighting as a professional, he fought 150 times as an amateur.

He won his professional debut on points then knocked out his next ten opponents in short rounds. All his first opponents were unknowns but then he also knocked out former two time WBC world Champion Thai fighter Wandee Singwancha (record 57–10) via second-round KO.

Sonsona climbed up in weight to challenge José López for the WBO super flyweight title on September 5, 2009. He scored a knockdown in the fourth round and fought his way to a unanimous decision victory.

On November 20, 2009, Sonsona vacated his newly won WBO super flyweight title after not being able to make the weight limit for his first title defense. The bout still went on with the WBO title at stake but only his challenger, Alejandro Mutchuneli (22–7–1), had the chance to win. At the end of the bout, the judges had it a split decision. With the result, Sonsona set a record for the Philippine boxer who had the shortest reign as world champion: 2 months and 17 days.

On February 27, 2010, Sonsona jumped two weight divisions, challenging undefeated Wilfredo Vázquez, Jr. for the vacant WBO super-bantamweight title. Vázquez, son of former world champion Wilfredo Vázquez, defeated Sonsona by knockout in the fourth round.

On October 15, 2011, Sonsona finally back in action facing Carlos Jakolmo, Sonsona sent the Mexican boxer to the canvass during the 8th round and He defeated Jakolmo via Unanimous Decision.

Sonsona claimed a 5th round KO victory against Dominican Republic's Carlos “El Burito” Fulgencio in the main event Pinoy Knockout 1 at the Hoops Dome in Lapu-Lapu City, Cebu, Philippines on March 17, 2012. Sonsona has assured himself of a slot in the undercard of Johnriel Casimero's IBF Interim light flyweight title defense against Mexico's Sammy Gutierrez on May 13, 2012, at the Waterfront Cebu City Hotel.

== Professional boxing record ==
24 fights	22 wins	1 loss
By knockout	15	1
By decision	7	0
Draws	1	

No.	Result	Record	Opponent	Type	Round, time	Date	Location	Notes
24	Win	22–1–1	Boyce Sultan	UD	8	20 Mar 2022	Misamis Oriental, Philippines	
23	Win	21–1–1	Arief Blader	UD	6	13 May 2018	SM North EDSA, Quezon City, Philippines	
22	Win	20–1–1	Jonathan Arrellano	MD	10	6 Jun 2015	StubHub Center, Carson, California, U.S.	
21	Win	19–1–1	Wilfredo Vázquez Jr.	SD	10	7 Jun 2014	Madison Square Garden, New York City, New York, U.S.	Won vacant NABF featherweight title
20	Win	18–1–1	Akifumi Shimoda	KO	4 (12), 1:13	22 Feb 2014	Cotai Arena, Macau, SAR	Won vacant WBO International featherweight title
19	Win	17–1–1	Jason Egera	RTD	8 (10), 3:00	7 Sep 2013	Poblacion Balamban Sports Complex, Balamban, Philippines	
18	Win	16–1–1	Carlos Fulgencio	KO	5 (10), 1:41	17 Mar 2012	Hoops Dome, Lapu-Lapu City, Philippines	
17	Win	15–1–1	Carlos Joan Gaspar Jacobo	UD	10	15 Oct 2011	Hoops Dome, Lapu-Lapu City, Philippines	
16	Loss	14–1–1	Wilfredo Vázquez Jr.	KO	4 (12), 2:01	27 Feb 2010	Coliseo Rubén Rodríguez, Bayamón, Puerto Rico	For vacant WBO junior featherweight title
15	Draw	14–0–1	Alejandro Hernández	SD	12	21 Nov 2009	Casino Rama, Rama, Ontario, Canada	Sonsona loses WBO junior flyweight title after missing weight
14	Win	14–0	José López	UD	12	4 Sep 2009	Casino Rama, Rama, Ontario, Canada	Won WBO junior bantamweight title
13	Win	13–0	Wandee Singwancha	TKO	2 (12), 1:59	28 May 2009	Cebu Coliseum, Cebu City, Philippines	Won vacant WBO Oriental flyweight title
12	Win	12–0	Lowie Bantigue	TKO	3 (8), 1:22	8 May 2009	Naga Sports Complex, Naga City, Philippines	
11	Win	11–0	Liempetch Sor Veerapol	TKO	5 (10), 2:59	31 Jan 2009	Cebu Coliseum, Cebu City, Philippines	Won vacant WBO Asia Pacific Youth flyweight title
10	Win	10–0	Jason Geda	TKO	1 (10), 2:51	13 Dec 2008	Compostela Sports Complex, Compostela, Philippines	
9	Win	9–0	Edwin Picardal	KO	5 (8), 2:29	30 Nov 2008	City Sports and Cultural Complex, Mandaue City, Philippines	
8	Win	8–0	Joel Rafols	TKO	2 (10), 2:19	4 Oct 2008	Naga Sports Complex, Naga City, Philippines	
7	Win	7–0	John Naimes	KO	1 (8), 2:32	14 Sep 2008	Cebu Coliseum, Cebu City, Philippines	
6	Win	6–0	Emer Barrientos	TKO	1 (8), 1:14	26 Aug 2008	City Amphitheater, Cagayan de Oro, Philippines	
5	Win	5–0	Jerome Bontog	TKO	5 (6), 1:40	19 Jul 2008	Cebu Coliseum, Cebu City, Philippines	
4	Win	4–0	Edwin Picardal	TKO	4 (6), 1:19	29 Feb 2008	Ynares Plaza Gymnasium, Binangonan, Philippines	
3	Win	3–0	Daryl Amoncio	TKO	2 (6), 2:54	8 Dec 2007	Palawan Provincial Gym, Puerto Princesa City, Philippines	
2	Win	2–0	Noel Guliman	TKO	4 (4), 1:34	29 Sep 2007	Ynares Plaza Gymnasium, Binangonan, Philippines	
1	Win	1–0	Richard Donaire	UD	4	7 Jul 2007	Ynares Plaza Gymnasium, Binangonan, Philippines	

== See also ==
- List of southpaw stance boxers
- Notable boxing families
- List of Filipino boxing world champions
- List of world super-flyweight boxing champions

Sporting positions
Regional boxing titles
Vacant Title last held by Javier Malulan	WBO Asia Pacific Youth flyweight champion October 4, 2008 – 2010; Vacated	Vacant Title next held by Froilan Saludar
Vacant Title last held by Richie Mepranum	WBO Oriental flyweight champion May 28, 2009 – 2010; Vacated	Vacant Title next held by Ardin Diale
Vacant Title last held by Vasiliy Lomachenko	WBO International featherweight champion February 22, 2014 – 2015; Vacated	Vacant Title next held by Mark Magsayo
Vacant Title last held by Ronny Rios	NABF featherweight champion June 7, 2014 – 2015; Vacated	Vacant Title next held by Joseph Diaz
World boxing titles
Preceded by José López	WBO super-flyweight champion September 4, 2009 – November 20, 2009; Stripped, did not make weight	Vacant Title next held by Jorge Arce
