= José López (boxer) =

Puerto Rican boxer (born 1972)

Personal information
- Nickname: "Carita"
- Nationality: Puerto Rico
- Born: José Ángel López Rivera; March 29, 1972 (age 54) Trujillo Alto, Puerto Rico
- Height: 5 ft 5 in (165 cm)
- Weight: Super flyweight

Boxing career
- Stance: Orthodox

Boxing record
- Total fights: 49
- Wins: 39
- Win by KO: 32
- Losses: 8
- Draws: 2

José Ángel "Carita" López Rivera (born March 29, 1972) is a Puerto Rican former professional boxer who has competed in the flyweight and super flyweight divisions. His first professional championship was the Puerto Rican flyweight title, which won by defeating José Luis De Jesús. López's first championship opportunity was against Alberto Jiménez for the World Boxing Organization's flyweight title, in a contest that he lost by unanimous decision. This was followed by three more world championships fights, two of them for major titles. However, López lost these contests by unanimous decision. On June 23, 2001, López won the WBO Latino super flyweight title. After losing to Fernando Montiel in his fifth world title opportunity, he recurred to fight for regional championships. From 2001 to 2008, López compiled an undefeated record consisting of 14 wins and a single draw. On March 28, 2009, López defeated Pramuansak Phosuwan to win the WBO's super flyweight world championship.

== Professional career ==
López debuted on November 27, 1991, competing against Juan Cruz, in a contest that ended with a draw. In an immediate rematch, Cruz won by points. Subsequently, López defeated Daniel Pérez, Melquiades Ventura, José Ayala and Victor Cruz before losing to Andy Agosto by points. Following this fight, he defeated eleven consecutive opponents by knockout, in the process defeating José Luis De Jesús for the Puerto Rican flyweight title. Among the pugilist defeated were: Neil Swain, Julio César Acevedo, Alberto Cantú and Andres Buchito Adames. López's first world title fight was against Alberto Jiménez for the World Boxing Organization's flyweight championship, losing it by unanimous decision. He would defeat Miguel Santos, Martin Solorio, José Luis Zepeda and Fernando Valencia by knockout before receiving a second opportunity for the organism's championship. The incumbent, Carlos Gabriel Salazar, retained by unanimous decision in a fight card organized in Argentina. After winning two more fights by knockout, López fought against Isidro García for the vacant title. García, who replaced Alejandro Montiel prior to the fight, won by unanimous decision. After defeating Iván Salazar and Rafael Orozco by knockout, López moved up one division to challenge Mauricio Pastrana for the International Boxing Association's super flyweight championship, but lost by unanimous decision.

=== Regional championships ===
On June 23, 2001, López defeated Javier Cintrón by technical knockout to win the WBO Latino super flyweight title. After losing his third fight for the WBO flyweight championship to Fernando Montiel in a fight where he scored a knockdown in the ninth round, López began defending the regional title, beginning an undefeated streak of six years. On June 7, 2002, he defeated Alejandro Moreno by unanimous decision, as part of a card held in Reno, Nevada. Three months later, López was paired against Alberto Ontiveros, winning by technical knockout in three rounds. On September 19, 2003, he returned to action following a year of inactivity. In this contest, López defeated Everardo Morales by unanimous decision, winning the WBO Latino flyweight championship. On December 12, 2003, he competed against Juan Alfonso Keb Baas, receiving a draw from the judges. In his first defense of the WBO Latino title, López defeated Omar Soto by knockout in two rounds. On June 25, 2004, he defended the regional title in Puerto Rico, winning against Javier Cintrón by technical knockout. This was followed by a rematch against Keb Baas, whom he defeated by technical knockout in eleven rounds. In his only fight of 2005, López won by knockout against Luis Ángel Martínez in an unification fight, which also included the World Boxing Council's FECARBOX flyweight title. On April 1, 2006, he fought against Ilido Julio for the WBC Latino flyweight championship, winning by technical knockout. This was followed by a contest versus former world champion Kermin Guardia, whom he defeated by unanimous decision in ten rounds. On December 16, 2006, López defeated the incumbent Mexican flyweight champion, Juan Alberto Rosas, by majority decision. In his only fight of 2007, he fought Antonio María Cochero Díaz, winning by unanimous decision. On April 5, 2008, López received his second regional championship opportunity in the super flyweight limit. He challenged Juan Mercedes for the WBO Latino super flyweight title, defeating him by technical knockout in four rounds. Four months later, he was paired against Oscar Andrade, receiving a technical knockout victory. The outcome was product of referee intervention after was knocked down on three occasions. On October 4, 2008, López defended the WBO Latino super flyweight title for the first time, defeating Jonathan Pérez by technical knockout in seven rounds.

=== Winning and defending the WBO super flyweight title ===
López became the second contender for the title held by Montiel. However, Bob Arum, Montiel's promoter, announced on January 8, 2009, that he was having difficulty to make the flyweight limit, choosing to vacate the championship. Nonito Donaire, who was scheduled to fight against Montiel, was the considered López's next opponent. Ultimately, Pramuansak Phosuwan was the pugilist selected to fight for the vacant title. The card, which was held at the Coliseo Rubén Rodríguez in Bayamón, marked the first time that López fought for a world championship in Puerto Rico. In the first round both pugilists were effective in their offense, with López scoring more often. The following round, Phosuwan was able to connect while avoiding damage. After the third stanza, both fighters were more aggressive, which favored López, who connected with jabs and power punches. In the sixth, Phosuwan returned to the offensive, pushing his opponent to the ropes with combinations. Early in the following round both pugilists traded combinations, with López landing a solid punch before the recess. At this stage of the contest, Phosuwan began displaying symptoms of exhaustion. López dominated the ninth and tenths rounds, which featured pauses to fix the tape around his gloves. This pattern continued during the following chapter, Phosuwan was injured before the bell. In the last round, both traded punches and combinations, with Phosuwan being more active on the offensive. The judges presented scorecards of 116-112 and 117-111 twice, all in favor of López. In his first defense, the pugilist competed against Marvin Sonsona. However, the challenger was able to keep López on the defensive following a knockdown in the fourth round. Consequently, Sonsona received a unanimous decision of 114-111, 115-110 and 116-109. After eleven months of inactivity, López returned to activity against fellow Puerto Rican and the International Boxing Organization's flyweight champion, César Seda Jr., at a catch weight. A week before the contest, a case filed by PR Best Boxing, who claimed that they still had a fight left in his contract, was dismissed. This allowed López participation in the card organized by Javier Bustillo's Universal Promotions, which promotes Seda.

== Professional boxing record ==
52 fights	39 wins	11 losses
By knockout	32	2
By decision	7	9
Draws	2	

No.	Result	Record	Opponent	Type	Round, time	Date	Location	Notes
52	Loss	39–11–2	McJoe Arroyo	TKO	4 (10), 2:27	Sep 27, 2012	Hotel San Juan, Carolina, Puerto Rico	
51	Loss	39–10–2	Léo Santa Cruz	KO	5 (8), 2:35	Jun 3, 2011	Fantasy Springs Casino, Indio, California, U.S.	
50	Loss	39–9–2	César Seda	UD	10	Aug 27, 2010	Coliseo Dolores "Toyita" Meléndez, Juana Díaz, Puerto Rico	For vacant WBA Fedecaribe super-flyweight title
49	Loss	39–8–2	Marvin Sonsona	UD	12	Sep 4, 2009	Casino Rama, Rama, Canada	Lost WBO super-flyweight title
48	Win	39–7–2	Pramuansak Phosuwan	UD	12	Mar 28, 2009	Coliseo Rubén Rodríguez, Bayamón, Puerto Rico	Won vacant WBO super-flyweight title
47	Win	38–7–2	Jonathan Pérez	TKO	8 (12), 1:47	Oct 4, 2008	José Miguel Agrelot Coliseum, San Juan, Puerto Rico	Retained WBO Latino super-flyweight title
46	Win	37–7–2	Óscar Andrade	RTD	7 (10), 3:00	Aug 8, 2008	Coliseo Antonio R. Barceló, Toa Baja, Puerto Rico	
45	Win	36–7–2	Juan Mercedes	TKO	4 (12), 1:50	Apr 5, 2008	Roberto Clemente Coliseum, San Juan, Puerto Rico	Won WBO Latino super-flyweight title
44	Win	35–7–2	Antonio María Cochero Díaz	UD	12	Feb 16, 2007	Rock Church Auditorium, Kissimmee, Florida, U.S.	Retained WBA Fedecentro flyweight title
43	Win	34–7–2	Juan Alberto Rosas	MD	12	Dec 16, 2006	Coliseo Antonio R. Barceló, Toa Baja, Puerto Rica	Retained WBA Fedecentro and WBC Latino flyweight titles
42	Win	33–7–2	Kermin Guardia	UD	10	Aug 19, 2006	Auditorio Juan Pachín Vicéns, Ponce, Puerto Rico	Retained WBC Latino flyweight title; Won vacant WBA Fedecentro flyweight title
41	Win	32–7–2	Ilido Julio	TKO	6 (12)	Apr 1, 2006	Mario Morales Coliseum, Guaynabo, Puerto Rico	Won vacant WBC Latino flyweight title
40	Win	31–7–2	Luis Ángel Martínez	KO	8 (12), 2:49	Mar 11, 2005	Civic Center, Kissimmee, Florida, U.S.	Retained WBO Latino flyweight title; Won vacant WBC FECARBOX flyweight title
39	Win	30–7–2	Juan Alfonso Keb Baas	TKO	11 (12), 1:45	Sep 24, 2004	Miccosukee Indian Gaming Resort, Miami, Florida, U.S.	Retained WBO Latino flyweight title
38	Win	29–7–2	Javier Cintrón	TKO	3 (12), 2:35	Jun 25, 2004	Coliseo Pedrin Zorilla, San Juan, Puerto Rico	Retained WBO Latino flyweight title
37	Win	28–7–2	Omar Soto	KO	2 (12), 2:20	Apr 2, 2004	Equestrian Complex, Ocala, Florida, U.S.	Retained WBO Latino flyweight title
36	Draw	27–7–2	Juan Alfonso Keb Baas	PTS	8	Dec 2, 2003	Miccosukee Indian Gaming Resort, Miami, Florida, U.S.	
35	Win	27–7–1	Everardo Morales	UD	12	Sep 19, 2003	Civic Center, Kissimmee, Florida, U.S.	Won vacant WBO Latino flyweight title
34	Win	26–7–1	Alberto Ontiveros	TKO	3 (10), 1:33	Sep 13, 2002	Orleans Hotel & Casino, Las Vegas, Nevada, U.S.	
33	Win	25–7–1	Alejandro Moreno	UD	10	Jun 7, 2002	Eldorado Hotel Casino, Reno, Nevada, U.S.	
32	Loss	24–7–1	Fernando Montiel	UD	12	Sep 8, 2001	Lawlor Events Center, Reno, Nevada, U.S.	For WBO flyweight title
31	Win	24–6–1	Javier Cintrón	TKO	10 (12)	Jun 23, 2001	Bayamón, Puerto Rico	Won vacant WBO Latino super-flyweight title
30	Loss	23–6–1	Mauricio Pastrana	UD	12	Feb 10, 2001	Miccosukee Indian Gaming Resort, Miami, Florida, U.S.	For vacant IBA super-flyweight title
29	Win	23–5–1	Rafael Orozco	KO	1	Oct 22, 2000	Puerta de Tierra, San Juan, Puerto Rico	
28	Win	22–5–1	Iván Salazar	TKO	6	Jul 1, 2000	Bayamón, Puerto Rico	
27	Loss	21–5–1	Isidro García	UD	12	Dec 18, 1999	Fantasy Springs Casino, Indio, California, U.S.	For vacant WBO flyweight title
26	Win	21–4–1	Béla Sándor	TKO	3	Jun 4, 1999	Polideportivo Ciudad Jardín, Málaga, Spain	
25	Win	20–4–1	José Luis Velarde	TKO	2	May 23, 1998	Trujilla Alto, Puerto Rico	
24	Loss	19–4–1	Carlos Gabriel Salazar	SD	12	Mar 21, 1998	Club Acción, Presidencia Roque Sáenz Peña, Argentina	For WBO flyweight title
23	Win	19–3–1	Fernando Valencia	KO	8	Nov 10, 1997	Great Western Forum, Inglewood, California, U.S.	
22	Win	18–3–1	José Luis Zepeda	TKO	4	Jun 4, 1997	Dorado, Puerto Rico	
21	Win	17–3–1	Martín Solorio	KO	4	Feb 10, 1997	Great Western Forum, Inglewood, California, U.S.	
20	Win	16–3–1	Miguel Santos	TKO	4	Dec 13, 1996	Caguas, Puerto Rico	
19	Loss	15–3–1	Alberto Jiménez	UD	12	Jun 1, 1996	Caesars Tahoe, Stateline, Nevada, U.S.	For WBO flyweight title
18	Win	15–2–1	Wandi Asenso	TKO	1 (10)	Oct 27, 1995	Ponce, Puerto Rico	
17	Win	14–2–1	Andrés Buchito Adames	TKO	4	Jun 3, 1995	Guaynabo, Puerto Rico	
16	Win	13–2–1	Alejandro Cano	TKO	3	May 8, 1995	Condado, Puerto Rico	
15	Win	12–2–1	Mario Alberto Cruz Alfaro	TKO	2	Mar 4, 1995	San Juan, Puerto Rico	
14	Win	11–2–1	Alberto Cantú	KO	4	Dec 2, 1994	Trujillo Alto, Puerto Rico	
13	Win	10–2–1	Julio César Acevedo	TKO	8 (12)	Oct 1, 1994	Guaynabo, Puerto Rico	Retained Puerto Rican flyweight title
12	Win	9–2–1	Neil Swain	RTD	4 (6)	Jul 30, 1994	York Hall, London, England	
11	Win	8–2–1	Hector Roman	TKO	1	Apr 15, 1994	San Juan, Puerto Rico	
10	Win	7–2–1	Melquíades Ventura	TKO	2	Feb 26, 1994	Guaynabo, Puerto Rico	
9	Win	6–2–1	Félix Morales	TKO	4	Oct 15, 1993	Yabucoa, Puerto Rico	
8	Win	5–2–1	José Luis de Jesús	TKO	1 (12)	Sep 25, 1993	Guaynabo, Puerto Rico	Won vacant Puerto Rican flyweight title
7	Loss	4–2–1	Andy Agosto	PTS	6	May 15, 1993	Condado, San Juan, Puerto Rico	
6	Win	4–1–1	Víctor Cruz	KO	6	Dec 9, 1992	San Juan, Puerto Rico	
5	Win	3–1–1	José Ayala	TKO	5	Aug 22, 1992	Coliseo Rubén Rodríguez, Bayamón, Puerto Rico	
4	Win	2–1–1	Melquíades Ventura	PTS	4	May 27, 1992	San Juan, Puerto Rico	
3	Win	1–1–1	Daniel Pérez	KO	1	Mar 27, 1992	Aguadilla, Puerto Rico	
2	Loss	0–1–1	Juan Cruz	PTS	4	Feb 1, 1992	San Juan, Puerto Rico	
1	Draw	0–0–1	Juan Cruz	PTS	4	Nov 27, 1991	San Juan, Puerto Rico	

== Professional championships ==
Preceded by Fernando Montiel; Vacated	WBO Super Flyweight Champion; March 28 - September 5, 2009	Succeeded by Marvin Sonsona

== See also ==
- List of Puerto Ricans
- List of Puerto Rican boxing world champions
