= Ciso Morales =

Filipino boxer

Personal information
- Nickname: Kid Terrible
- Nationality: (Philippines) Filipino
- Born: Narciso Rosales Morales Jr. 4 November 1987 (age 38) Talibon, Bohol, Philippines
- Height: 5 ft 5 in (1.65 m)
- Weight: Bantamweight

Boxing career
- Stance: Orthodox

Boxing record
- Total fights: 15
- Wins: 14
- Win by KO: 8
- Losses: 1
- Draws: 0

Narciso Rosales Morales Jr. (born November 4, 1987, in Talibon, Bohol, Philippines), more commonly known as Ciso Morales, is a Filipino professional boxer.

Born in Talibon, Bohol, Morales currently resides in Cagayan de Oro, Misamis Oriental.

== Boxing career ==
Morales made his professional debut on February 16, 2007, defeating Ramil Nunez at the Sports Complex in Gusa, Cagayan de Oro, Misamis Oriental.

After winning his next 13 bouts, Morales compiled an undefeated record of 14 wins.

On November 13, 2009, fellow Filipino boxer Z Gorres earned a title shot defeating Luis Melendez of Colombia by unanimous decision. Gorres was scheduled to fight Fernando Montiel of Mexico for the WBO title in 2010. However, he collapsed shortly after the fight due to swelling on the left side of his brain; due to this injury, he could not box anymore. As a result, Ciso was chosen as the substitute for the bout.

The Morales-Montiel fight was one of the undercards of Pinoy Power 3. Morales was trained by Nonito Donaire Sr., father of interim WBA super flyweight champion Nonito Donaire Jr.; just like Donaire Jr. Morales faced Fernando Montiel (39–2–2) on February 13, 2010, at the Las Vegas Hilton in Paradise, Nevada. Montiel eventually defeated Morales via KO at the 1st round, ending Morales' undefeated streak.

In the final moments of the first round, a combination to the body landed by the Mexican fighter sent Morales down for the full count. As he was hit by a solid punch in the liver, Morales couldn't get up and continue to fight.

Morales has been on hiatus following his defeat to Montiel.
