= Genaro García (boxer) =

Mexican boxer (1997–2013)

- Born: September 17, 1977; Chihuahua, Mexico
- Died: June 21, 2013 (aged 35); San Lorenzo, Puebla, Mexico
- Cause of death: Gunshot wounds
- Occupation: Professional boxer
- Known for: Victim of murder

Genaro García (September 17, 1977 in Chihuahua, Mexico – June 21, 2013) was a professional boxer in the super flyweight and bantamweight divisions from 1994 to 2013, holding the World Boxing Council Fecombox regional bantamweight title from 2003 to 2007. Known by his nickname 'Poblanito', Garcia fought for world titles against Samson Dutch Boy Gym (WBF), Hozumi Hasagawa (WBC), and Luis Alberto Perez (IBF) during his career. His career record was 39 wins and 10 losses with 23 knockouts, including a seventh round knockout over Eduardo Garcia (no relation), a fighter with a winning record, in his final ring appearance in December 2012.

== Death in Mexico ==
García, 35, was beaten, and then shot four times in the head and killed after being pulled from his car by masked men in a van on June 21, 2013. His body was found on a nearby farm where he was taken and killed, located behind a church in San Lorenzo, Puebla, Mexico.

== See also ==
- List of unsolved murders (2000–present)
