= Jhonny González =

Mexican boxer (born 1981)

Personal information
- Nickname: Bombardero ("Bombardier")
- Born: Jhonny González Vera; 15 September 1981 (age 45) Pachuca, Hidalgo, Mexico
- Height: 5 ft 6 1/2 in (169 cm)
- Weight: Bantamweight; Super bantamweight; Featherweight; Super featherweight

Boxing career
- Reach: 69 in (175 cm)
- Stance: Orthodox

Boxing record
- Total fights: 82
- Wins: 69
- Win by KO: 56
- Losses: 12
- Draws: 1

Jhonny González Vera (born 15 September 1981) is a Mexican professional boxer. He is a two-time former world champion in two weight classes, having held the WBO bantamweight title from 2005 to 2007, and the WBC featherweight title twice between 2011 and 2015. Additionally, he held the IBO featherweight title from 2010 to 2011.

The name "Jhonny" originated as a misspelling of "Johnny" on his birth registration form.

== Professional career ==
=== Bantamweight ===
On 29 October 2005, González defeated Ratanachai Sor Vorapin by a technical knockout in the seventh round, for the WBO bantamweight championship. On 27 May 2006, he defended it successfully against Fernando Montiel with a 2–1 split decision.

=== Super bantamweight ===
While still holding the title he won from Sor Vorapin, Gonzalez went up in weight and attempted to capture the WBC super-bantamweight title on 16 September 2006. However, he lost to Israel Vázquez by a knockout and chose to return to bantamweight.

His second defense of his WBO bantamweight title was also successful when González beat former IBF flyweight champ Irene Pacheco on 30 March 2007. On his third defense however, González was dethroned by 35-year-old Gerry Penalosa, who knocked him out in the 7th round on 11 August 2007.

On 23 May 2009, González challenged Toshiaki Nishioka for the WBC Super Bantamweight Title in Monterrey, Mexico. González downed Nishioka in Round 1 but eventually lost by KO in Round 3, failing in his attempt to capture the Title.

After the fight against Nishioka, Gonzalez decide to change his team, he had always been trained by his father "Miguel Angel "Raton" Gonzalez", but now he is under the lessons of Ignacio Beristáin.

=== Featherweight ===
Gonzalez then decided to abandon the super bantamweight category and start visualizing himself as a featherweight world champion.

Gonzalez won the WBC International Featherweight title on 16 December 2009, against Marlon Aguilar. The fight took place at the Auditorio Plaza Condesa in Mexico City. Gonzales won the bout by TKO in round 4 and following these events, he looked for a new attempt to become a Mexican world champion. On 20 March 2010, Gonzales took on Antonio Davis at the City Discothèque in Cancun, Quintana Roo, in a WBC Featherweight Title Eliminator; the former WBO champion won by technical knockout in the second round, when the referee stopped the fight after Davis failed to respond following four consecutive knockdowns.

In his next bout, González fought Colombian Aristides Perez for the WBC FECARBOX featherweight title. González indicated that he had been training hard for the upcoming bout, seeking a world title shot. The Mexican was originally scheduled to fight Ira Terry, but the latter was replaced by Perez just a few days before the contest. The event was held in Campeche, Mexico, on 24 July 2010. The Pachuca native won the match by TKO in the second round, after knocking Perez down a few moments before.

González challenged Jackson Asiku on 15 September 2010, at the Hilton Hotel in Las Vegas, with the IBO Featherweight title on the line. The Mexican pugilist defeated his opponent by TKO in the 6th round, to win the IBO Featherweight title.

==== WBC featherweight champion ====
González visited Japan in an unstable situation after the Sendai earthquake to win the WBC Featherweight Championship via a fourth-round technical knockout over Hozumi Hasegawa as a mandatory challenger at the World Memorial Hall in Kobe on 8 April 2011.

After defending his title four times, Gonzalez lost to Daniel Ponce de Leon in a technical decision on 14 September 2012. The fight went to the judges after eight rounds when Gonzalez could not continue due to an accidental headbutt. Gonzalez had been knocked down in the 6th round.

Gonzalez won back the WBC Featherweight title with a first-round TKO over the heavily favored undefeated champion Abner Mares on 24 August 2013.

He defended the title twice before being knocked out by American Gary Russell in 4 rounds in Las Vegas.

== Professional boxing record ==
82 fights	69 wins	12 losses
By knockout	56	4
By decision	13	8
Draws	1	

No.	Result	Record	Opponent	Type	Round, time	Date	Location	Notes
82	Loss	69–12–1	Takuya Watanabe	MD	10	3 December 2022	Paradise City Plaza, Incheon, South Korea	
81	Draw	69–11–1	Jafel Perales	SD	10	3 September 2022	Mexico City, Mexico	
80	Win	69–11	Sergio Puente	RTD	4 (10), 3:00	18 December 2021	Tuza Forum, Pachuca, Mexico	
79	Win	68–11	Ramiro Blanco	UD	12	17 August 2019	Centro de Convenciones, Fresnillo, Mexico	
78	Win	67–11	Rafael Hernandez	KO	5 (12), 2:36	18 May 2019	Lienzo Charro, Saltillo, Mexico	
77	Loss	66–11	Tomás Rojas	MD	12	6 October 2018	Arena Coliseo, Mexico City, Mexico	For vacant WBC FECARBOX super featherweight title
76	Win	66–10	Marlyn Cabrera	UD	12	7 April 2018	Hotel Azul Ixtapa, Zihuatanejo, Mexico	Retained WBC Latino super featherweight title
75	Win	65–10	Irving Berry	UD	12	4 November 2017	Gimnasio Municipal "Jose Neri Santos", Ciudad Juárez, Mexico	Retained WBC Latino super featherweight title
74	Win	64–10	Jessie Cris Rosales	KO	2 (12), 2:04	22 July 2017	Lienzo Charro Parral, Parral, Mexico	Retained WBC Latino super featherweight title
73	Win	63–10	Francisco Contreras	KO	3 (12), 2:41	25 March 2017	Gimnasio Municipal "Jose Neri Santos", Ciudad Juárez, Mexico	Won vacant WBC Latino super featherweight title
72	Win	62–10	Hirotsugu Yamamoto	KO	1 (12), 2:59	24 September 2016	Grand Oasis, Cancún, Mexico	Retained WBC Silver International super featherweight title
71	Win	61–10	Christopher Martin	RTD	10 (12), 3:00	18 June 2016	Deportivo Agustín Ramos Millan, Toluca, Mexico	Retained WBC Silver International super featherweight title
70	Win	60–10	Justin Savi	TKO	2 (10), 1:45	2 April 2016	Centro de Convenciones, Tlalnepantla, Mexico	Retained WBC Silver International super featherweight title
69	Win	59–10	Hurricane Futa	UD	12	5 December 2015	Polideportivo Centenario, Los Mochis, Mexico	Won vacant WBC Silver International super featherweight title
68	Loss	58–10	Jonathan Oquendo	MD	10	12 Sep 2015	MGM Grand Garden Arena, Paradise, Nevada, U.S.	
67	Win	58–9	Kazuki Hashimoto	TKO	2 (12)	1 August 2015	Auditorio Bicentenario, Morelia, Mexico	
66	Loss	57–9	Gary Russell Jr.	TKO	4 (12), 0:37	28 March 2015	Pearl Concert Theater, Paradise, Nevada, U.S.	Lost WBC featherweight title
65	Win	57–8	Jorge Arce	TKO	11 (12), 2:43	4 October 2014	Gimnasio Polifuncional, Los Mochis, Mexico	Retained WBC featherweight title
64	Win	56–8	Clive Atwell	TD	10 (12)	24 May 2014	Grand Hotel Convention Center, Acapulco, Mexico	Retained WBC featherweight title; Unanimous TD after González cut from accidental head clash
63	Win	55–8	Abner Mares	KO	1 (12), 2:55	24 August 2013	StubHub Center, Carson, California, U.S.	Won WBC featherweight title
62	Win	54–8	Akihiko Katagiri	TKO	4 (12), 1:18	27 April 2013	Arena México, Mexico City, Mexico	
61	Win	53–8	Eusebio Osejo	UD	12	23 February 2013	Centro de Convenciones Azul Ixtapa, Zihuatanejo, Mexico	
60	Loss	52–8	Daniel Ponce de León	TD	8 (12), 2:36	15 September 2012	MGM Grand Garden Arena, Paradise, Nevada, U.S.	Lost WBC featherweight title; Unanimous TD after González cut from accidental head clash
59	Win	52–7	Elio Rojas	UD	12	28 April 2012	Grand Oasis, Cancún, Mexico	Retained WBC featherweight title
58	Win	51–7	Roinet Caballero	KO	2 (12)	3 December 2011	Arena México, Mexico City, Mexico	Retained WBC featherweight title
57	Win	50–7	Rogers Mtagwa	TKO	2 (12), 2:15	15 September 2011	County Coliseum, El Paso, Texas, U.S.	Retained WBC featherweight title
56	Win	49–7	Tomas Villa	TKO	4 (12), 0:49	9 July 2011	Boardwalk Hall, Atlantic City, New Jersey, U.S.	Retained WBC featherweight title
55	Win	48–7	Hozumi Hasegawa	TKO	4 (12), 0:58	8 April 2011	World Memorial Hall, Kobe, Japan	Won WBC featherweight title
54	Win	47–7	Santos Marimon	TKO	2 (10)	20 November 2010	Monterrey Arena, Monterrey, Mexico	
53	Win	46–7	Jackson Asiku	TKO	6 (12), 1:09	15 September 2010	Las Vegas Hilton, Winchester, Nevada, U.S.	Won IBO featherweight title
52	Win	45–7	Aristides Perez	TKO	2 (12), 2:20	24 July 2010	Campeche City, Mexico	Retained WBC FECARBOX featherweight title
51	Win	44–7	Jean Javier Sotelo	TKO	2 (12), 2:50	15 May 2010	Domo del Mar, Ciudad del Carmen, Mexico	Won WBC FECARBOX featherweight title
50	Win	43–7	Antonio Davis	TKO	2 (12), 2:31	20 March 2010	The City Discotheque, Cancún, Mexico	
49	Win	42–7	Marlon Aguilar	TKO	4 (12), 2:52	16 December 2009	El Plaza Condesa, Mexico City, Mexico	
48	Win	41–7	Jose Francisco Mendoza	KO	1 (10)	5 September 2009	Gimnasio Rodrigo M. Quevedo, Chihuahua City, Mexico	
47	Loss	40–7	Toshiaki Nishioka	TKO	3 (12), 1:20	23 May 2009	Monterrey Arena, Monterrey, Mexico	For WBC super bantamweight title
46	Win	40–6	Reynaldo Lopez	KO	4 (10), 2:17	21 November 2008	Morongo Casino Resort & Spa, Cabazon, California, U.S.	
45	Win	39–6	Leivi Brea	TKO	1 (8), 2:47	1 August 2008	Desert Diamond Casino, Phoenix, Arizona, U.S.	
44	Win	38–6	Mauricio Pastrana	TKO	4 (10), 2:32	16 May 2008	Morongo Casino Resort & Spa, Cabazon, California, U.S.	
43	Win	37–6	Edel Ruiz	KO	3 (10), 2:23	4 April 2008	Morongo Casino Resort & Spa, Cabazon, California, U.S.	
42	Win	36–6	Giovanny Urbina	TKO	2 (10), 1:00	29 February 2008	Gimnasio Rodrigo M. Quevedo, Chihuahua City, Mexico	
41	Win	35–6	Jose Angel Beranza	UD	10	16 November 2007	Cicero Stadium, Cicero, Illinois, U.S.	
40	Loss	34–6	Gerry Peñalosa	KO	7 (12), 2:45	11 August 2007	ARCO Arena, Sacramento, California, U.S.	Lost WBO bantamweight title
39	Win	34–5	Irene Pacheco	TKO	9 (12), 1:04	30 March 2007	Desert Diamond Casino, Tucson, Arizona, U.S.	Retained WBO bantamweight title
38	Loss	33–5	Israel Vázquez	TKO	10 (12), 2:09	16 September 2006	MGM Grand Garden Arena, Paradise, Nevada, U.S.	For WBC super bantamweight title
37	Win	33–4	Fernando Montiel	SD	12	27 May 2006	Home Depot Center, Carson, California, U.S.	Retained WBO bantamweight title
36	Win	32–4	Mark Johnson	KO	8 (12), 1:08	25 Feb 2006	Mandalay Bay Events Center, Paradise, Nevada, U.S.	
35	Win	31–4	Ratanachai Sor Vorapin	TKO	7 (12), 0:22	29 October 2005	Desert Diamond Casino, Tucson, Arizona, U.S.	Won WBO bantamweight title
34	Win	30–4	William Gonzalez	KO	3 (12), 3:07	1 September 2005	Desert Diamond Casino, Tucson, Arizona, U.S.	Retained WBO–NABO bantamweight title
33	Win	29–4	Adolfo Landeros	UD	10	16 June 2005	Sundance Square, Fort Worth, Texas, U.S.	
32	Win	28–4	Trinidad Mendoza	TKO	3 (10), 2:59	1 April 2005	La Villa Real Special Events Center, McAllen, Texas, U.S.	
31	Win	27–4	Adonis Rivas	UD	12	17 February 2005	Avalon, Los Angeles, California, U.S.	Retained WBC Continental Americas bantamweight title
30	Win	26–4	Gabriel Elizondo	TKO	2 (12), 2:36	18 November 2004	American Bank Center, Corpus Christi, Texas, U.S.	Retained WBC Continental Americas and WBO–NABO bantamweight titles
29	Win	25–4	Hugo Vargas	KO	3 (10), 2:08	3 September 2004	Desert Diamond Casino, Tucson, Arizona, U.S.	
28	Win	24–4	Francisco Tejedor	TKO	1 (10), 2:59	19 June 2004	Home Depot Center, Carson, California, U.S.	
27	Win	23–4	Alejandro Montiel	TKO	6 (12), 0:21	13 May 2004	Sports Arena, San Diego, California, U.S.	Won vacant WBO–NABO bantamweight title
26	Win	22–4	Roger Gonzalez	TKO	6 (10), 2:42	25 March 2004	Grand Olympic Auditorium, Los Angeles, California, U.S.	
25	Win	21–4	Moises Zamudio	TKO	5 (12), 2:18	27 February 2004	Poliforo Juan Gabriel, Ciudad Juárez, Mexico	Retained WBC Continental Americas bantamweight title
24	Win	20–4	Jorge Alberto Reyes	KO	1 (12)	10 October 2003	Poliforo Juan Gabriel, Ciudad Juárez, Mexico	Retained Mexico bantamweight title
23	Win	19–4	Ramon Leyte	TKO	4 (12), 1:05	13 June 2003	Plaza de Toros Monumental, Ciudad Juárez, Mexico	Won vacant Mexico bantamweight title
22	Win	18–4	Diego Andrade	TKO	1 (10), 1:41	28 March 2003	Poliforo Juan Gabriel, Ciudad Juárez, Mexico	
21	Win	17–4	Francisco Mateos	TKO	1 (12)	28 March 2003	Arena México, Mexico City, Mexico	Won vacant WBC Continental Americas bantamweight title
20	Win	16–4	Ruben Lopez	KO	2 (10)	31 August 2002	Arena México, Mexico City, Mexico	
19	Win	15–4	Gilberto Bolanos	RTD	6 (10), 0:10	6 July 2002	Arena México, Mexico City, Mexico	
18	Loss	14–4	Ricardo Vargas	TD	7 (12)	7 April 2002	Soboba Casino, San Jacinto, California, U.S.	Lost NABF bantamweight title; Unanimous TD
17	Loss	14–3	Ricardo Vargas	UD	10	7 April 2002	Pechanga Resort & Casino, Temecula, California, U.S.	
16	Win	14–2	Ablorh Sowah	TKO	10 (12), 2:38	26 October 2001	Pechanga Resort & Casino, Temecula, California, U.S.	Won vacant NABF bantamweight title
15	Win	13–2	Saul Briseno	TKO	8 (10)	6 September 2001	Mexico City, Mexico	
14	Win	12–2	Juan Luis Torres	TKO	4 (8), 2:29	14 July 2001	Pavilions, Houston, Texas, U.S.	
13	Win	11–2	Carlos Garcia	KO	2	25 May 2001	Ciudad Juárez, Mexico	
12	Win	10–2	Julio Cesar Avila	TKO	1 (10), 2:51	7 April 2001	Mexico City, Mexico	
11	Win	9–2	Ulises Flores	TKO	4 (10), 2:21	27 January 2001	Arena México, Mexico City, Mexico	
10	Win	8–2	Gabriel Arevalo	TKO	4 (10)	9 December 2000	Mexico City, Mexico	
9	Win	7–2	Jaime Ortiz	TKO	5	14 October 2000	Arena México, Mexico City, Mexico	
8	Win	6–2	Arturo Hernandez	KO	3 (8)	2 September 2000	Arena México, Mexico City, Mexico	
7	Win	5–2	Cecilio Marino Jimenez	TKO	4 (8), 1:05	24 June 2000	Arena México, Mexico City, Mexico	
6	Win	4–2	Francisco Paredes	PTS	6	22 April 2000	Arena México, Mexico City, Mexico	
5	Win	3–2	German Lozada	TKO	5 (6)	4 March 2000	Arena México, Mexico City, Mexico	
4	Win	2–2	Hugo Campos	TKO	4 (4)	12 February 2000	Mexico City, Mexico	
3	Win	1–2	Mario Rodriguez	PTS	4	29 January 2000	Arena México, Mexico City, Mexico	
2	Loss	0–2	Hugo Vargas	MD	4	6 November 1999	Arena México, Mexico City, Mexico	
1	Loss	0–1	Mario Perez	UD	4	14 August 1999	Arena México, Mexico City, Mexico	

== Titles in boxing ==
=== Major world titles ===
- WBO bantamweight champion (118 lbs)
- WBC featherweight champion (126 lbs) (2x)

=== Minor world titles ===
- IBO featherweight champion (126 lbs)

=== Regional/International titles ===
- NABF bantamweight champion (118 lbs)
- WBC Continental Americas bantamweight champion (118 lbs)
- Mexico bantamweight champion (118 lbs)
- WBO-NABO bantamweight champion (118 lbs)
- WBC-FECARBOX featherweight champion (126 lbs)
- WBC Silver International super featherweight champion (130 lbs)
- WBC Latino super featherweight champion (130 lbs)

== Personal life ==
González married professional wrestler Dulce García, better known as Sexy Star, in June 2015.

== See also ==
- List of WBC world champions
- List of Mexican boxing world champions

Sporting positions
Regional boxing titles
Vacant Title last held by Adan Vargas	NABF bantamweight champion 26 October 2001 – 7 April 2002	Succeeded by Ricardo Vargas
Vacant Title last held by Julio Zarate	WBC Continental Americas bantamweight champion 26 October 2001 – September 2006; Vacated	Vacant Title next held by Yonnhy Pérez
Vacant Title last held by Julio Zarate	Mexico bantamweight champion 13 June 2003 – February 2005; Vacated	Vacant Title next held by Jaime Ortiz
Vacant Title last held by Roger Gonzalez	WBO–NABO bantamweight champion 13 May 2004 – 29 October 2005; Won world title	Vacant Title next held by Abner Mares
Preceded by Jean Javier Sotelo	WBC FECARBOX featherweight champion 15 May 2010 – 8 April 2011; Won world title	Vacant Title next held by Claudio Marrero
Vacant Title last held by Eden Sonsona	WBC Silver International super featherweight champion 5 December 2015 – January 2017; Vacated	Vacant Title next held by Horacio Alfredo Cabral
Vacant Title last held by Jayson Vélez	WBC Latino super featherweight champion 25 March 2017 – present	Incumbent
Minor world boxing titles
Preceded by Jackson Asiku	IBO featherweight champion 15 September 2010 – April 2011; Vacated	Vacant Title next held by Daud Yordan
Major world boxing titles
Preceded by Ratanachai Sor Vorapin	WBO bantamweight champion 29 October 2005 – 11 August 2007	Succeeded by Gerry Peñalosa
Preceded by Hozumi Hasegawa	WBC featherweight champion 8 April 2011 – 15 September 2012	Succeeded by Daniel Ponce de León
Preceded by Abner Mares	WBC featherweight champion 24 August 2013 – 28 March 2015	Succeeded by Gary Russell Jr.
