= Joseph Agbeko =

Ghanaian boxer

Personal information
- Nickname: King Kong
- Nationality: Ghanaian
- Born: 22 March 1980 (age 46) Accra, Ghana
- Height: 1.66 m (5 ft 5 in)
- Weight: Bantamweight

Boxing career
- Reach: 166 cm (65 in)
- Stance: Orthodox

Boxing record
- Total fights: 43
- Wins: 38
- Win by KO: 28
- Losses: 5

Joseph Agbeko (born 22 March 1980) is a Ghanaian professional boxer. He is a two-time former bantamweight world champion, having held the IBF title twice between 2007 and 2011. Additionally he held the Commonwealth bantamweight title from 2004 to 2006; the IBO bantamweight title in 2013; and has challenged once for a super bantamweight world title in 2013.

== Professional career ==
On September 29, 2007, he dethroned Luis Alberto Perez to become the new IBF bantamweight titleholder. Agbeko was inactive for 1 year, 2 months and 11 days before defending his title on December 11, 2008. In a fight that had been repeatedly postponed, he defeated William Gonzalez by majority decision. On July 11, 2009, Agbeko successfully defended his IBF bantamweight title by scoring a unanimous decision win over former two division champion Vic Darchinyan. On Halloween night, October 31, 2009, Agbeko lost his IBF title by 12 round unanimous decision to 20-0 Colombian challenger Yonnhy Pérez.

=== Perez vs. Agbeko II ===
On December 11, 2010, Agbeko was given the chance to regain his IBF title when he took on Yonnhy Pérez in the semi-finals of the Showtime Bantamweight tournament, which was televised live from The Battle at the Boat series at the Emerald Queen Casino in Tacoma, Washington. Rather than brawling as he had done in his first fight with Pérez, Agbeko chose to use his boxing skills and stiff jab to cruise to a unanimous decision victory, with the judges scoring it 116–112, 117-111 and 115–113. Also on the card was Abner Mares, who defeated Vic Darchinyan via controversial split-decision to advance to the finals and a showdown with Agbeko.

=== Agbeko vs. Mares ===
"King Kong" Agbeko was scheduled to take on Abner Mares in the Bantamweight Tournament Final: Winner Takes All on Saturday, April 23, on Showtime. However, Agbeko pulled out of the fight just days prior, citing an injury, and the fight was rescheduled for August 13 in Las Vegas.

The fight ensued as scheduled on the 13th. However, the focal point of the fight became referee Russell Mora who repeatedly warned Mares for low blows without taking a point. To Agbeko's credit, despite at least 23 blows to the belt and below, he did not retaliate in kind.

Post fight, Jim Gray continued Showtime's lambasting of Mora in an interview where he plainly showed the crucial call that turned the fight, a low blow in the 11th leading to a knockdown.

In all there were two knockdowns. The first coming early could have been called a slip but a punch was landed. The second was the result of what was definitely a low blow. It is possible that without the knockdown, Mares would not have won the fight. The scoring read 115–111, 115-111 and 113-113.

=== Retirement ===
Agbeko announced his retirement from professional boxing on 14 August 2024, having not fought for four years.

== Professional boxing record ==
43 fights	38 wins	5 losses
By knockout	28	0
By decision	10	5

No.	Result	Record	Opponent	Type	Round, time	Date	Location	Notes
43	Win	38–5	(Ghana) Albert Commey	TKO	5 (10), 1:07	26 Dec 2020	Idrowhyt Event Centre, Accra, Ghana	
42	Win	37–5	(Kenya) Gabriel Ochieng	TKO	9 (12), 2:30	2 Nov 2019	Aborigenes Beach Resort, Keta, Ghana	Retained WBO Africa bantamweight title
41	Win	36–5	(Tanzania) Hashimu Zuberi	UD	12	19 Apr 2019	Aborigenes Beach Resort, Keta, Ghana	Retained WBO Africa bantamweight title
40	Win	35–5	(Ghana) Ekow Wilson	TKO	10 (12)	8 Sep 2018	Woezer Hotel, Ho, Ghana	Retained WBO Africa bantamweight title
39	Win	34–5	(Uganda) Frank Kiwalabye	UD	12	30 Mar 2018	Mission Ga School Park, Aflao, Ghana	Won vacant WBO Africa bantamweight title
38	Win	33–5	(Ghana) Abdul Malik Jabir	TKO	10 (10)	3 Nov 2017	Aborigines Beach Resort, Keta, Ghana	
37	Win	32–5	(Ghana) Martin Ahiadekey	TKO	7 (8)	14 Oct 2017	City Engineers Yard, Accra, Ghana	
36	Win	31–5	(Tanzania) Haji Juma	UD	10	28 Oct 2016	Sports Stadium, Accra, Ghana	
35	Win	30–5	(Philippines) Juanito Rubillar	TKO	4 (10), 1:31	30 May 2015	(United States) County Coliseum, El Paso, Texas, US	
34	Loss	29–5	(Cuba) Guillermo Rigondeaux	UD	12	7 Dec 2013	(United States) Boardwalk Hall, Atlantic City, New Jersey, US	For WBA (Super), WBO, and The Ring super bantamweight titles
33	Win	29–4	(Colombia) Luis Melendez	UD	12	22 Mar 2013	Sports Stadium, Accra, Ghana	Won vacant IBO bantamweight title
32	Loss	28–4	(Mexico) Abner Mares	UD	12	3 Dec 2011	(United States) Honda Center, Anaheim, California, US	For WBC Silver and IBF bantamweight titles
31	Loss	28–3	(Mexico) Abner Mares	MD	12	13 Aug 2011	(United States) The Joint, Paradise, Nevada, US	Lost IBF bantamweight title; For WBC Silver bantamweight title
30	Win	28–2	(Colombia) Yonnhy Pérez	UD	12	11 Dec 2010	(United States) Emerald Queen Casino, Tacoma, Washington, US	Won IBF bantamweight title
29	Loss	27–2	(Colombia) Yonnhy Pérez	UD	12	31 Oct 2009	(United States) Treasure Island Hotel and Casino, Paradise, Nevada, US	Lost IBF bantamweight title
28	Win	27–1	(Armenia) Vic Darchinyan	UD	12	11 Jul 2009	(United States) BankAtlantic Center, Sunrise, Florida, US	Retained IBF bantamweight title
27	Win	26–1	(Nicaragua) William Gonzalez	MD	12	11 Dec 2008	(United States) Prudential Center, Newark, New Jersey, US	Retained IBF bantamweight title
26	Win	25–1	(Nicaragua) Luis Alberto Pérez	RTD	7 (12), 3:00	29 Sep 2007	(United States) ARCO Arena, Sacramento, California, US	Won IBF bantamweight title
25	Win	24–1	(United States) Fidencio Reyes	TKO	4 (8), 1:23	9 Aug 2007	(United States) The Joint, Paradise, Nevada, US	
24	Win	23–1	(Ghana) Baba Nsor	TKO	4	23 Mar 2007	Azumah Nelson Sports Complex, Accra, Ghana	
23	Win	22–1	(Ghana) Sumaila Badu	UD	12	29 Oct 2004	Sports Stadium, Accra, Ghana	Won vacant Commonwealth bantamweight title
22	Loss	21–1	(Ukraine) Volodymyr Sydorenko	MD	12	18 May 2004	Hansehalle, Lübeck, Germany	For EBA bantamweight title
21	Win	21–0	(South Africa) Cedric Conway	TKO	6 (10)	13 Jun 2003	Sports Stadium, Accra, Ghana	
20	Win	20–0	(Benin) Charlemagne Agbotomey	TKO	4 (10), 1:02	4 Oct 2002	Globe Cinema, Accra, Ghana	
19	Win	19–0	(Romania) Sabin Bornei	TKO	6 (12), 1:30	10 May 2002	(United Kingdom) Britannia International Hotel, London, England	Retained WBF (Federation) bantamweight title
18	Win	18–0	(Uganda) Michael Kizza	TKO	2 (12)	8 Sep 2001	Kaneshie Sports Complex, Accra, Ghana	Won vacant WBF (Federation) bantamweight title
17	Win	17–0	(Cameroon) Faustin Rostand	TKO	2 (6)	27 Jul 2001	Kaneshie Sports Complex, Accra, Ghana	
16	Win	16–0	(Nigeria) Ganiyu Olafimihan	KO	2	6 Jun 2001	Ghana	
15	Win	15–0	(Ivory Coast) Moses Kennedy	KO	2	4 May 2001	Ivory Coast	
14	Win	14–0	(Nigeria) Mike Orlando	KO	4	24 Mar 2001	Nigeria	
13	Win	13–0	(Ivory Coast) Chris Bandel	KO	2	20 Mar 2001	Ivory Coast	
12	Win	12–0	(South Africa) Johannes Maisa	UD	12	14 Nov 2000	Carnival City, Brakpan, South Africa	Retained African bantamweight title
11	Win	11–0	(Benin) Arouma Yessoufou	KO	1	7 Oct 2000	Benin	
10	Win	10–0	(Togo) Laurent Zakpo	KO	2	29 Aug 2000	Benin	
9	Win	9–0	(Ghana) Ola Balougon	TKO	2 (12), 0:52	5 May 2000	Accra, Ghana	Won vacant African bantamweight title
8	Win	8–0	(Nigeria) Friday Fatunji Felix	KO	1 (10)	16 Oct 1999	Nigeria	
7	Win	7–0	(Senegal) Freddy Mutala	KO	7	19 Sep 1999	Senegal	
6	Win	6–0	(Ghana) Abdul Malik Jabir	KO	1 (12)	30 Jul 1999	Kaneshie Sports Complex, Accra, Ghana	Won vacant Ghanaian bantamweight title
5	Win	5–0	(Benin) Patrice Owai	PTS	6	4 Jun 1999	Benin	
4	Win	4–0	(Ghana) Roland Igbafei	TKO	2	1 May 1999	Accra, Ghana	
3	Win	3–0	(Ivory Coast) Ray Medoza	KO	8	4 Apr 1999	Ivory Coast	
2	Win	2–0	(Togo) Laurent Zakpo	KO	2	13 Mar 1999	Togo	
1	Win	1–0	(Ghana) Agaitor Yao	KO	1 (6)	16 Dec 1998	Kaneshie Sports Complex, Accra, Ghana	

== Honors ==
In 2010, to honor Joseph's exploits in the sport of boxing, the town of Sogakope in the Volta Region of Ghana enstooled him as a warrior chief. His enstoolment name was Togbe Kaletor I, which means 'Brave Warrior.'

Sporting positions
Regional boxing titles
Vacant Title last held by Steve Dotse	Ghanaian bantamweight champion 30 July 1999 – May 2000; Vacated	Vacant Title next held by Anyetei Laryea
Vacant Title last held by Steve Dotse	ABU bantamweight champion 5 May 2000 – September 2001; Vacated	Vacant Title next held by Friday Fatunji Felix
Vacant Title last held by Steve Molitor	Commonwealth bantamweight champion 29 October 2004 – June 2006; Vacated	Vacant Title next held by Tshifhiwa Munyai
Vacant Title last held by Duke Micah	WBO Africa bantamweight champion 30 March 2018 – present	Incumbent
Minor world boxing titles
Vacant Title last held by Steve Molitor	WBF (Federation) bantamweight champion 8 September 2001 – June 2002; Vacated	Vacant Title next held by Lubabalo Msuthu
Vacant Title last held by Anselmo Moreno	IBO bantamweight champion 22 March 2013 – December 2013; Vacated	Vacant Title next held by Juan Carlos Payano
Major world boxing titles
Preceded by Luis Alberto Pérez	IBF bantamweight champion 29 September 2007 – October 31, 2009	Succeeded by Yonnhy Pérez
Preceded by Yonnhy Pérez	IBF bantamweight champion 11 December 2010 – 13 August 2011	Succeeded by Abner Mares
