= Victor Terrazas =

Mexican boxer (born 1983)

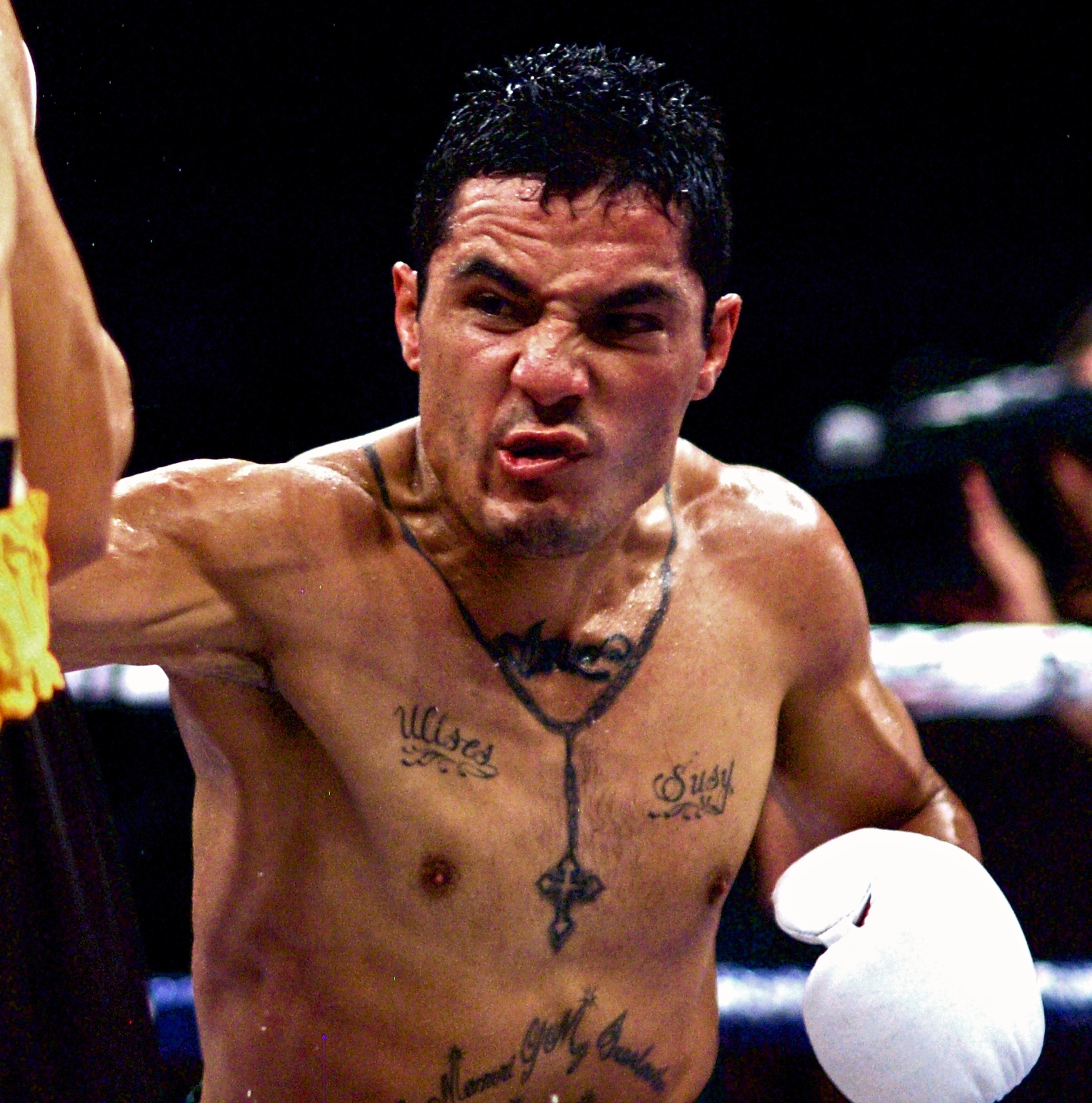
- Terrazas in 2010

Personal information
- Nickname: Vikingo
- Born: Víctor José Terrazas Martínez; 11 February 1983 (age 43) Guadalajara, Mexico
- Height: 5 ft 5 1/2 in (166 cm)
- Weight: Super bantamweight; Featherweight; Super featherweight

Boxing career
- Reach: 65 1/2 in (166 cm)
- Stance: Orthodox

Boxing record
- Total fights: 47
- Wins: 38
- Win by KO: 21
- Losses: 7
- Draws: 2

Víctor José Terrazas Martínez (born 11 February 1983) is a Mexican professional boxer and a former WBC super bantamweight champion.

== Professional career ==
Terrazas turned professional in 2003 and would lose his first fight to Adrian Tellez by second round stoppage. He worked his way up to a world title eliminator in 2010 against British boxer Rendall Munroe. In the fight he would lose his first fight in seven years by ninth round stoppage.

On 19 November 2011 Terrazas upset former world champion Fernando Montiel, to win the WBC Silver Super bantamweight Championship.

In April 2013, Terrazas defeated Christian Mijares in a close split-decision to win the vacant WBC super bantamweight title vacated by Abner Mares. Terrazas won despite being knocked down in the 12th round.

In August 2013 Terrazas would lose the title in his first defence against Leo Santa Cruz via third-round technical knockout in Los Angeles.

== Professional boxing record ==
47 fights	38 wins	7 losses
By knockout	21	6
By decision	17	1
Draws	2	

No.	Result	Record	Opponent	Type	Round, time	Date	Location	Notes
47	Loss	38–7–2	(United States) Jerrico Walton	UD	8 (8)	2019-08-23	(United States) Arabia Shrine Center, Houston	
46	Loss	38–6–2	(Puerto Rico) Jayson Vélez	TKO	4 (10)	2019-03-16	(Puerto Rico) Coliseo Rafael G Amalbert, Juncos	
45	Loss	38–5–2	(United States) Joseph Diaz	KO	3 (10)	2018-02-22	(United States) Fantasy Springs Resort Casino, Indio	For WBC-NABF featherweight title
44	Draw	38–4–2	(Spain) Andoni Gago	TD	4 (10)	2017-12-15	(Spain) Frontón Bizkaia, Bilbao	
43	Loss	38–4–1	(Mexico) Eduardo Hernández	KO	2 (12)	2016-10-22	Arena Coliseo, Mexico City	For interim WBC Latino Super featherweight title
42	Win	38–3–1	(Mexico) Cristian Arrazola	MD	8 (8)	2016-07-23	(Mexico) Oasis Hotel Complex, Cancun	
41	Loss	37–3–1	(Mexico) Léo Santa Cruz	KO	3 (12)	2013-08-24	(United States) Dignity Health Sports Park, Carson	Lost WBC Super bantamweight title
40	Win	37–2–1	(Mexico) Cristian Mijares	SD	12 (12)	2013-04-20	Mexico City Arena, Mexico City	Won vacant WBC Super bantamweight title
39	Win	36–2–1	(United States) Juan Ruiz	SD	8 (8)	2012-12-15	(United States) Toyota Center, Houston	
38	Win	35–2–1	(Mexico) Eduardo Garcia	KO	6 (10)	2012-08-11	(Mexico) Complejo Panamericano, Guadalajara	
37	Win	34–2–1	(Colombia) Jose Palma	KO	4 (12)	2012-04-14	(Mexico) Arandas Municipal Auditorium, Arandas	Retained WBC Silver Super bantamweight title
36	Win	33–2–1	(Mexico) Fernando Montiel	UD	12 (12)	2011-11-19	(Mexico) Estadio Centenario, Los Mochis	Won vacant WBC Silver Super bantamweight title
35	Win	32–2–1	(Mexico) Eduardo Becerril	TKO	4 (10)	2011-09-24	(Mexico) Auditorio del Estado, Mexicali	
34	Win	31–2–1	(Colombia) Feider Viloria	TKO	3 (12)	2011-06-25	(Mexico) Domo del Mar, Ciudad Del Carmen	Won Interim NABA Super bantamweight title
33	Win	30–2–1	(Venezuela) Nehomar Cermeño	SD	12 (12)	2011-01-29	(Mexico) Arena Coliseo, Guadalajara	
32	Win	29–2–1	(Mexico) Filomeno Jaramillo	TKO	2 (10)	2010-12-04	(Mexico) Estadio Universitario Beto Ávila, Veracruz	
31	Win	28–2–1	(Japan) Junta Sekimoto	TKO	6 (10)	2010-10-09	(Mexico) Mesón de los Deportes, Tepic	
30	Win	27–2–1	(Mexico) Hugo Pacheco	TKO	2 (4)	2010-08-28	(Mexico) Lobodome, Mazatlan	
29	Loss	26–2–1	(United Kingdom) Rendall Munroe	TKO	9 (12)	2010-04-23	(United Kingdom) Skydome, Coventry	
28	Win	26–1–1	(Mexico) Antonio Meza	RTD	2 (10)	2009-11-28	(Mexico) Coliseo Olimpico de la UG, Guadalajara	
27	Win	25–1–1	(Nicaragua) Marlon Aguilar	UD	12 (12)	2009-10-03	(Mexico) Coliseo Olimpico de la UG, Guadalajara	Won vacant WBC FECARBOX Featherweight title
26	Win	24–1–1	(Mexico) Filomeno Jaramillo	TKO	7 (12)	2009-06-27	(Mexico) Plaza de Toros, Nuevo Laredo	Won Interim Mexico Super bantamweight title
25	Win	23–1–1	(Mexico) Ramon Mendez	TKO	2 (8)	2009-02-21	(Mexico) Auditorio Benito Juárez, Zapopan	
24	Win	22–1–1	(Mexico) Carlos Medellin	TKO	5 (12)	2009-01-17	(Mexico) Foro Scotiabank, Polanco	Retained WBC FECARBOX Featherweight title
23	Win	21–1–1	(Mexico) Eder Marquez	TKO	3 (8)	2008-12-06	(Mexico) Palenque Calle 2, Zapopan	
22	Win	20–1–1	(Mexico) Francisco Valdez	TKO	5 (12)	2008-08-13	(Mexico) Foro Scotiabank, Polanco	
21	Win	19–1–1	(Mexico) Juan Carlos Martinez	UD	6 (6)	2008-05-24	(Mexico) La Feria de Santa Rita, Chihuahua	
20	Win	18–1–1	(Mexico) Edgar Riovalle	KO	7 (12)	2008-03-08	(Mexico) El Circulo, Guadalajara	Won vacant WBC FECARBOX Featherweight title
19	Win	17–1–1	(Mexico) Martin Fing	UD	10 (10)	2007-12-15	(Mexico) Auditorio Benito Juarez, Guadalajara	
18	Win	16–1–1	(Mexico) Luis Cid Pacheco	TKO	9 (10)	2007-08-18	(Mexico) Coliseo Olimpico de la UG, Guadalajara	
17	Win	15–1–1	(Mexico) Adrian Tellez	TKO	7 (10)	2007-05-19	(Mexico) Auditorio Benito Juarez, Guadalajara	
16	Win	14–1–1	(Mexico) Alberto Chuc	UD	10 (10)	2007-03-29	(Mexico) Auditorio Municipal, Tijuana	
15	Win	13–1–1	(Mexico) Jose Luis Caro	TKO	4 (8)	2007-02-17	(Mexico) Palenque de la Expo, Ciudad Obregon	
14	Win	12–1–1	(Mexico) Joaquin Vargas	TKO	5 (10)	2006-10-27	(Mexico) Arena Jalisco, Guadalajara	
13	Win	11–1–1	(Mexico) Pedro Navarrete	UD	8 (8)	2006-10-09	(Mexico) El Foro, Tijuana	
12	Win	10–1–1	(Mexico) Adrian Atanasio Vazquez	KO	2 (8)	2006-07-21	(Mexico) Arena Coliseo, Guadalajara	
11	Win	9–1–1	(Mexico) Moises Zamudio	UD	8 (8)	2006-06-17	(Mexico) Auditorio Municipal, Tijuana	
10	Win	8–1–1	(Mexico) Alfredo Camargo	TKO	3 (6)	2006-05-20	(Mexico) Plaza Los Tres Presidentes, Guaymas	
9	Win	7–1–1	(Mexico) Giovanni Caro	TKO	3 (4)	2006-02-10	(Mexico) Men´s Club, Guadalajara	
8	Draw	6–1–1	(Mexico) Saul Osuna	PTS	6 (6)	2004-12-17	Mexico City	
7	Win	6–1	(Mexico) Santos Orlando Morales	UD	4 (4)	2004-07-22	Salon 21, Mexico City	
6	Win	5–1	(Mexico) Josue Cortes	UD	4 (4)	2004-06-17	Salon 21, Mexico City	
5	Win	4–1	(Mexico) Oliver Nahum Bojorquez	MD	4 (4)	2004-05-20	Salon 21, Mexico City	
4	Win	3–1	(Mexico) Javier Hernandez	UD	4 (4)	2004-04-01	Salon 21, Mexico City	
3	Win	2–1	(Mexico) Victor Avila	SD	6 (6)	2003-10-25	(Mexico) Arena Jalisco, Guadalajara	
2	Win	1–1	(Mexico) Daniel Delgado	SD	4 (4)	2003-07-19	Mexico	
1	Loss	0–1	(Mexico) Adrian Tellez	KO	2 (4)	2003-03-13	Foro Las Americas, Mexico City	

== See also ==
- List of world super-bantamweight boxing champions
- List of Mexican boxing world champions

Sporting positions
World boxing titles
Vacant Title last held by Abner Mares	WBC super bantamweight champion 20 April 2013 – 24 August 2013	Succeeded by Léo Santa Cruz
