= Claudio Marrero =

Dominican Republic boxer

Personal information
- Born: Claudio Ezequiel Marrero Guzmán
- Height: 5 ft 8 in (173 cm)
- Weight: Featherweight; Super featherweight

Boxing career
- Reach: 68 in (173 cm)
- Stance: Southpaw

Boxing record
- Total fights: 32
- Wins: 27
- Win by KO: 19
- Losses: 5
Medal record
Men's Boxing
Representing Dominican Republic
Pan American Games
Silver medal – second place	2007 Rio de Janeiro	Bantamweight

Claudio Marrero Guzman is a Dominican professional boxer.

== Professional career ==
On 23 August 2013, Marrero lost to Jesús Cuellar for the interim WBA featherweight title on ESPN Friday Night Fights. On 29 April 2017, he won the WBA interim, and IBO featherweight titles by knocking out Carlos Zambrano in the first round. He would lose the WBA belt in his next fight by KO against Jesus Rojas.

== Professional boxing record ==
32 fights	27 wins	5 losses
By knockout	19	2
By decision	8	3

No.	Result	Record	Opponent	Type	Round, time	Date	Location	Notes
32	Win	27–5	Gonzalo Fuenzalida	TKO	5 (8), 0:43	11 Feb 2023	Alamodome, San Antonio, Texas, U.S.	
31	Win	26–5	Viktor Slavinskyi	MD	8	26 Feb 2022	The Cosmopolitan, Paradise, Nevada, U.S.	
30	Win	25–5	Luis Castillo Leal	TKO	4 (8), 2:02	4 Sep 2021	Gimnasio Juan Francisco Estrada, Hermosillo, Mexico	
29	Loss	24–5	Xavier Martinez	UD	12	24 Oct 2020	Mohegan Sun Arena, Uncasville, Connecticut, U.S.	
28	Loss	24–4	Kid Galahad	RTD	8 (12), 3:00	8 Feb 2019	FlyDSA Arena, Sheffield, England, U.K.	
27	Win	24–3	Eduardo Ramirez	UD	12	29 Jun 2019	NRG Arena, Houston, Texas, U.S.	
26	Loss	23–3	Nyambayaryn Tögstsogt	UD	12	26 Jan 2019	Barclays Center, New York City, New York, U.S.	For vacant IBO featherweight title
25	Win	23–2	Jorge Lara	KO	1 (10)	28 Apr 2018	Don Haskins Center, El Paso, Texas, U.S.	
24	Loss	22–2	Jesús Rojas	KO	7 (12)	15 Sep 2017	MGM Grand Marquee Ballroom, Paradise, Nevada, U.S.	Lost WBA interim featherweight title
23	Win	22–1	Carlos Zambrano	KO	1 (12)	29 Apr 2017	Sam's Town Hotel & Gambling Hall, Las Vegas, Nevada, U.S.	Won WBA interim, and IBO featherweight title
22	Win	21–1	Luis Hinojosa	TKO	4 (10)	21 Aug 2016	Ford Amphitheater, New York City, New York, U.S.	
21	Win	20–1	Jonathan Arrellano	UD	6	27 Feb 2016	Honda Center, Anaheim, California, U.S.	
20	Win	19–1	Rico Ramos	KO	3 (10)	25 Jul 2015	Pearl Theater, Paradise, Nevada, U.S.	
19	Win	18–1	Orlando Rizo	UD	8	20 Feb 2015	CONSOL Energy Center, Pittsburgh, Pennsylvania, U.S.	
18	Win	17–1	Ira Terry	TKO	6 (10)	21 Nov 2014	Hard Rock Hotel & Casino, Tulsa, Oklahoma, U.S.	
17	Win	16–1	Felix Perez	TKO	2 (6)	8 Aug 2014	CONSOL Energy Center, Pittsburgh, Pennsylvania, US	
16	Win	15–1	Jose Angel Beranza	UD	8	22 Feb 2014	Sands Bethlehem Event Center, Bethlehem, Pennsylvania, U.S.	
15	Loss	14–1	Jesús Cuellar	UD	12	23 Aug 2013	Turning Stone Resort Casino, Verona, New York, U.S.	For WBA interim featherweight title
14	Win	14–0	Mauricio Martínez	TKO	4 (10)	30 Nov 2012	BB&T Center, Sunrise, Florida, U.S.	
13	Win	13–0	Juan Jose Beltran	TKO	3 (10)	21 Jul 2012	Seminole Hard Rock Hotel and Casino, Hollywood, Florida, U.S.	Won WBA Fedelatin featherweight title
12	Win	12–0	Emmanuel Lucero	UD	10	18 May 2012	Seminole Hard Rock Hotel and Casino, Hollywood, Florida, U.S.	Retained WBC FECARBOX featherweight title
11	Win	11–0	Gerardo Zayas	UD	10	2 Mar 2013	Westin Diplomat Resort, Hollywood, Florida, U.S.	Retained WBC FECARBOX featherweight title
10	Win	10–0	Francis Ruiz	TKO	2 (8)	7 Jan 2012	Westin Diplomat Resort, Hollywood, Florida, U.S.	Won WBC FECARBOX featherweight title
9	Win	9–0	Charles E Jones	TKO	3 (6)	3 Dec 2011	Greensboro Coliseum, Greensboro, North Carolina, U.S.	
8	Win	8–0	Ambiorix Ciriaco	TKO	2 (6)	5 Sep 2011	Coliseo Carlos 'Teo' Cruz, Santo Domingo, Dominican Republic	
7	Win	7–0	Hipolito Rivera	TKO	4 (6)	23 Apr 2011	Miami-Dade County Fair & Exposition, Miami, Florida, U.S.	
6	Win	6–0	David Reyes	UD	4	4 Mar 2011	Pharaoh's Casino, Managua, Nicaragua	
5	Win	5–0	Jin Kelly	TKO	1 (6)	29 Nov 2010	Coliseo Pepe Mayen, San Pedro de Macorís, Dominican Republic	
4	Win	4–0	Miguelo Tavarez	KO	1 (6)	20 Nov 2010	Sosua Bay Grand Casino, Puerto Plata, Dominican Republic	
3	Win	3–0	Dionisio Rodriguez	TKO	1 (6)	16 Oct 2010	Polideportivo, San Cristóbal, Dominican Republic	
2	Win	2–0	Junior Rodriguez	TKO	1 (6)	9 Oct 2010	La Vega, Dominican Republic	
1	Win	1–0	Juan Carlos Rosario	TKO	1 (4)	18 Sep 2010	Coliseo Carlos 'Teo' Cruz, Santo Domingo, Dominican Republic	

== See also ==
- List of southpaw stance boxers

Sporting positions
Regional boxing titles
Vacant Title last held by Jhonny González	WBC FECARBOX featherweight champion 7 January 2012 – 2012; Vacated	Vacant Title next held by Andrés Gutiérrez
Vacant Title last held by Luis Del Valle	NABA featherweight champion 2 March 2012 – 2013; Vacated	Vacant Title next held by Logan McGuinness
Vacant Title last held by Nicholas Walters	WBA Fedelatin featherweight champion 21 July 2012 – 2013; Vacated	Vacant Title next held by Carlos Zambrano
New title	WBA Gold super-featherweight champion 29 June 2019 – 2019; Vacated	Vacant Title next held by Mark Urvanov
Minor World boxing titles
Vacant Title last held by Lusanda Komanisi	IBO featherweight champion 29 April 2017 – September 2017; Vacated	Vacant Title next held by Tugstsogt Nyambayar
Major World boxing titles
Preceded by Carlos Zambrano	WBA featherweight champion Interim title 29 April 2017 – 15 September 2017	Succeeded by Jesús Rojas
