= Yonnhy Pérez vs. Joseph Agbeko II =

Boxing match

The Bantamweight Tournament Semi Finals:Yonnhy Pérez vs. Joseph Agbeko II
- Date: December 11, 2010
- Venue: Emerald Queen Casino, Tacoma, Washington, U.S.
- Title(s) on the line: IBF bantamweight title

Tale of the tape
Boxer	(Colombia) Yonnhy Pérez	(Ghana) Joseph Agbeko
Nickname	"El Colombiano"	"King Kong"
Hometown	Cartagena, Caribbean Colombian, Colombia	Accra, Greater Accra, Ghana
Pre-fight record	20–0–1 (14 KO)	27–2 (22 KO)
Age	31 years, 10 months	30 years, 8 months
Height	5 ft 5 in (165 cm)	5 ft 5 in (165 cm)
Weight	118 lb (54 kg)	117 1/2 lb (53 kg)
Style	Orthodox	Orthodox
Recognition	IBF; Bantamweight Champion; The Ring; No. 3 Ranked Bantamweight	IBF; No. 2 Ranked Bantamweight; The Ring; No. 5 Ranked Bantamweight; Former bantamweight champion

Result
- Agbeko defeats Pérez via unanimous decision

Yonnhy Pérez vs. Joseph Agbeko II was a professional boxing match contested on December 11, 2010, for the IBF bantamweight championship.

== Background ==
Four bantamweight boxers participated in The Bantamweight Tournament: Winner Takes All, one of the bouts being Yonnhy Pérez vs. Joseph Agbeko II. The tournament itself was a two-stage, single-elimination tournament of 118-pounders – which began with two semifinal bouts on Saturday, Dec. 11, 2010, in the Battle at the Boat series from the Emerald Queen Casino in Tacoma, Wash.

=== Build up ===
Rather than an immediate rematch with Pérez and Mares, Pérez faced Joseph Agbeko for the second time in the first round for his IBF, which he won from him, in Showtime's upcoming bantamweight tournament while Mares faces Vic Darchinyan. The winners of both fights will face each other sometime in early 2011.

The fighters were little-known outside of boxing circles, fighting in a 118-pound division that rarely gets attention. They signed on for a single-elimination tournament. The tournament was originally scheduled for Leon, Mexico, but Showtime did a site survey and found that the cost for staging the event there - including security in a region that has been besieged by violence among the drug cartels - would be prohibitive. When no venue could be secured in Los Angeles, the event was moved to Tacoma, Wash. Pérez was the only current champion, (Vic Darchinyan was the IBO champion, but that organization lacks recognition by the International Boxing Hall of Fame, other organizations, and boxing magazines) while Agbeko had held world titles and Mares was a top contender. They had a combined record of 102-4-3 with 76 knockouts before these two bouts.

== The fights ==
In the opening bout, undefeated, world-ranked rising star Abner Mares of Guadalajara Jalisco, Mexico, faced two-division world champion Vic Darchinyan of Sydney, Australia, by way of Armenia.

In the main event, Pérez and Agbeko squared off against each other for the second time. They had fought a Fight of the Year candidate the previous October.

=== Main Event ===
Rather than brawling as he had done in his first fight with Pérez, Agbeko chose to use his boxing skills and stiff jab to cruise to a unanimous decision victory, with the judges scoring it 116–112, 117-111 and 115–113.

== Aftermath ==
Agbeko was scheduled to take on Mares in the Bantamweight Tournament Final on April 23, 2011. However, Agbeko pulled out of the fight just days prior, citing an injury, and the fight was rescheduled for August 13 in Las Vegas.

== Undercard ==
Confirmed bouts:

=== Televised ===
- Bantamweight bout: (Colombia) Yonnhy Pérez (c) vs. (Ghana) Joseph Agbeko
  - Agbeko defeats Pérez via unanimous decision.
- Bantamweight bout: (Armenia) Vic Darchinyan (c) vs. (Mexico) Abner Mares
  - Mares defeats Darchinyan via split decision.
- Super Flyweight bout: (Puerto Rico) Cesar Seda vs. (United States) Ernie Marquez
  - Seda defeats Marquez via TKO in round 1.
- Super Bantamweight bout: (United States) Chris Avalos vs. (Mexico) Cecilio Santos
  - Avalos defeats Santos via RTD at 0:01 of round 4.

== Broadcasting ==
Country	Broadcaster
United States	Showtime

Preceded by vs. Abner Mares	Yonnhy Pérez's bouts 11 December 2010	Succeeded by vs. Vic Darchinyan
Preceded by First bout	Joseph Agbeko's bouts 11 December 2010	Succeeded by vs. Abner Mares
