= Jonathan Oquendo =

Puerto Rican boxer (born 1983)

Personal information
- Nickname: Polvo
- Nationality: Puerto Rican
- Born: Jonathan Oquendo Arnaldi; August 3, 1983 (age 42) Bayamón, Puerto Rico
- Height: 5 ft 4 in (163 cm)
- Weight: Super bantamweight; Featherweight; Super featherweight

Boxing career
- Reach: 67 in (170 cm)
- Stance: Orthodox

Boxing record
- Total fights: 40
- Wins: 31
- Win by KO: 19
- Losses: 9

Jonathan Oquendo Arnaldi (born August 3, 1983) is a Puerto Rican professional boxer who has challenged twice for a world title: the WBA (Regular) featherweight title in 2015, and the WBO junior lightweight title in September 2020. He has held multiple regional titles, including the WBO–NABO junior featherweight title in 2010 and the junior lightweight version from 2018 to 2019.

== Professional career ==
Oquendo made his professional debut on June 25, 2004, scoring a third-round technical knockout (TKO) victory against Yuniel Ramos at the Civic Center in Kissimmee, Florida.

After compiling a record of 14–1 (9 KOs) he faced future two-weight world champion Juan Manuel López for the WBO Latino junior featherweight title on February 23, 2008, at the Coliseo Héctor Solá Bezares in Caguas, Puerto Rico. Oquendo suffered his second professional defeat, losing by third-round TKO. At the time of the stoppage he was behind on the scorecards, with all three judges scoring the bout in López' favor at 20–15, 19–16, and 19–17.

He bounced back from defeat with three wins, two by stoppage, before making a second attempt at the WBO Latino title, facing Jose Angel Beranza on February 27, 2010, at the Coliseo Rubén Rodríguez in Bayamón, Puerto Rico. Oquendo captured his first professional title, defeating Beranza via unanimous decision (UD) over twelve rounds, with the judges' scorecards reading 118–108, 117–109, and 114–112.

In his next fight he faced Eden Sonsona for the vacant WBO-NABO junior featherweight title on July 10, 2010, at the José Miguel Agrelot Coliseum. Oquendo captured his second regional title, defeating Sonsona via ninth-round knockout (KO). At the time of the stoppage Oquendo was ahead on two of the judges' scorecards at 75–73 and 74–73, while the third judge scored the bout 75–74 in favour of Sonsona.

Following two more KO wins he made his third attempt for the WBO Latino title, this time facing Jose Luis Araiza for the vacant title on October 1, 2011, at the Coliseo Rubén Rodríguez. Oquendo dropped his opponent to the canvas in the first round en route to a second-round KO victory.

For his next fight he returned to the Coliseo Rubén Rodríguez, facing former world champion Wilfredo Vázquez Jr. for the vacant WBO International junior featherweight title on October 6, 2012. In a fight which Oquendo was winning on the scorecards, he was forced to go down to the canvas on one knee following a series of punches in round seven. He stayed down until the referee finished the count of ten, handing him a TKO defeat.

He came back from defeat to score two wins, one by stoppage, before suffering his fourth defeat at the hands of former two-weight world champion Abner Mares in July 2014. Eight months later he faced Gabino Cota for the WBO Latino interim featherweight title on March 6 at the Civic Center in Kissimmee, Florida. Oquendo captured the interim regional title with a wide UD win over ten rounds, with two judges scoring the bout 99–91 and the third scoring it 98–92.

Following a ten-round majority decision (MD) victory against former two-weight world champion Jhonny González in September, Oquendo got his first chance to fight for a world title, challenging WBA (Regular) featherweight champion Jesús Cuellar. The bout took place on December 5, 2015, at the Barclays Center in New York City, and served as part of the undercard for the Daniel Jacobs vs. Peter Quillin world title fight. Oquendo was sent down to the canvas in the fourth round en route to a UD loss, with one judge scoring the bout a shutout at 120–107 and the other two scoring it 116–111.

After his defeat to Cuellar, Oquendo he moved up a division to junior lightweight. He scored two stoppage wins before fighting for his first title at the weight—the WBO-NABO junior lightweight title—against Jose Lopez on October 6, 2018, at the Puerto Rico Convention Center in San Juan. Oquendo suffered a knockdown in the first round, only to go on to win the bout in the seventh round after a flurry of unanswered punches forced the referee to step in and call a halt to the contest, handing Oquendo a TKO win and the regional WBO title.

Following an eight-round UD victory against Deivi Julio Bassa in a non-title fight in December, he made a defense of his title against Lamont Roach Jr., with Roach's WBO International title also on the line. The bout took place on May 4, 2019, at the T-Mobile Arena in Paradise, Nevada, and served as part of the undercard for the Canelo Álvarez vs. Daniel Jacobs world title fight. Oquendo suffered his sixth professional defeat, losing by a wide UD over ten rounds, with one judge scoring the bout 96–93 and the other two scoring it 97–92.

He came back from defeat to capture the vacant WBO Latino junior lightweight title on November 14, 2019, defeating Charles Huerta via UD over ten rounds at the Belasco Theater in Los Angeles, California, with all three judges scoring the bout 100–90.

He was set to make a second attempt at a world title, challenging WBO junior lightweight champion Jamel Herring. The bout was scheduled to take place on July 2, 2020, at the MGM Grand Conference Center, in Paradise, Nevada, however, after Herring tested positive for COVID-19, the bout was postponed to July 14. After Herring gave a negative test prior to July 14, he was given the go ahead to travel to the MGM Grand and enter 'the bubble'—a predesignated containment area at the MGM Grand for fighters, trainers and officials involved in the event—before taking another test for COVID-19. The second test, however, gave another positive result, causing the fight to be postponed once again with the new date being scheduled for September 5.

== Professional boxing record ==
40 fights	31 wins	9 losses
By knockout	19	3
By decision	12	4
By disqualification	0	2

No.	Result	Record	Opponent	Type	Round, time	Date	Location	Notes
40	Loss	31–9	Jordan White	TKO	1 (10), 1:05	May 18, 2024	Entertainment and Sports Arena, Washington, D.C., U.S.	
39	Loss	31–8	Toka Kahn Clary	UD	10	Nov 19, 2022	Twin River Event Center, Lincoln, Rhode Island, U.S.	
38	Loss	31–7	Jamel Herring	DQ	8 (12), 3:00	Sep 5, 2020	MGM Grand Conference Center, Paradise, Nevada, U.S.	For WBO junior lightweight title; Oquendo disqualified for repeated headbutts
37	Win	31–6	Charles Huerta	UD	10	Nov 14, 2019	Belasco Theatre, Los Angeles, California, U.S.	Won vacant WBO Latino junior lightweight title
36	Loss	30–6	Lamont Roach Jr.	UD	10	May 4, 2019	T-Mobile Arena, Paradise, Nevada, U.S.	Lost WBO–NABO junior lightweight title; For WBO International junior lightweight title
35	Win	30–5	Deivi Julio Bassa	UD	8	Dec 8, 2018	Coliseo Antonio R. Barcelo, Toa Baja, Puerto Rico	
34	Win	29–5	Jose Lopez	TKO	6 (10), 2:40	Oct 6, 2018	Puerto Rico Convention Center, San Juan, Puerto Rico	Won vacant WBO–NABO junior lightweight title
33	Win	28–5	Daulis Prescott	TKO	2 (8)	Aug 4, 2018	Cancha Nilmarie Santini, San Juan, Puerto Rico	
32	Win	27–5	Orlando Rizo	RTD	5 (10), 3:00	Jul 21, 2017	Sheraton Puerto Rico Hotel & Casino, San Juan, Puerto Rico	
31	Loss	26–5	Jesús Cuellar	UD	12	Dec 5, 2015	Barclays Center, New York City, New York, U.S.	For WBA (Regular) featherweight title
30	Win	26–4	Jhonny González	MD	10	Sep 12, 2015	MGM Grand Garden Arena, Paradise, Nevada, U.S.	
29	Win	25–4	Gabino Cota	UD	10	Mar 6, 2015	Civic Center, Kissimmee, Florida, U.S.	Won vacant WBO interim featherweight title
28	Loss	24–4	Abner Mares	UD	10	Jul 12, 2014	MGM Grand Garden Arena, Paradise, Nevada, U.S.	
27	Win	24–3	Guillermo Avila	UD	12	Mar 14, 2014	Civic Center, Kissimmee, Florida, U.S.	
26	Win	23–3	José Miguel Tamayo	TKO	4 (8), 0:55	Aug 17, 2013	El San Juan Resort and Casino, Carolina, Puerto Rico	
25	Loss	22–3	Wilfredo Vázquez Jr.	TKO	7 (12), 2:33	Oct 6, 2012	Coliseo Rubén Rodríguez, Bayamón, Puerto Rico	For vacant WBO International junior featherweight title
24	Win	22–2	Jose Luis Araiza	KO	2 (12), 0:56	Oct 1, 2011	Coliseo Rubé Rodríguez, Bayamón, Puerto Rico	Won vacant WBO Latino junior featherweight title
23	Win	21–2	Adolfo Landeros	KO	1 (10), 1:47	Jun 3, 2011	Coliseo Antonio R. Barcelo, Toa Baja, Puerto Rico	
22	Win	20–2	Cecilio Santos	KO	1 (10), 2:46	Jan 22, 2011	Complejo Correccional INST 1072, Bayamón, Puerto Rico	
21	Win	19–2	Eden Sonsona	TKO	9 (10), 1:05	Jul 10, 2010	José Miguel Agrelot Coliseum, San Juan, Puerto Rico	Won vacant WBO-NABO junior featherweight title
20	Win	18–2	Jose Angel Beranza	UD	12	Feb 27, 2010	Coliseo Rubén Rodríguez, Bayamón, Puerto Rico	Won vacant WBO Latino junior featherweight title
19	Win	17–2	Juan José Beltrán	TKO	2 (8), 1:34	Oct 24, 2009	Roberto Clemente Coliseum, San Juan, Puerto Rico	
18	Win	16–2	Felix Flores	TKO	5 (8), 1:57	Jun 26, 2009	Deauville Beach Resort, Miami, Florida, U.S.	
17	Win	15–2	Jose Angel Beranza	UD	10	Oct 17, 2008	Coliseo Francisco Deyda, Hatillo, Puerto Rico	
16	Loss	14–2	Juan Manuel López	TKO	3 (12), 0:39	Feb 23, 2008	Coliseo Héctor Solá Bezares, Caguas, Puerto Rico	For WBO Latino junior featherweight title
15	Win	14–1	Andrés Ledesma	TKO	2 (8), 0:37	Dec 8, 2007	MGM Grand Garden Arena, Paradise, Nevada, U.S.	
14	Win	13–1	Pedro Rincon Miranda	KO	1 (4), 1:20	Aug 25, 2007	Coliseo Rubén Rodríguez, Bayamón, Puerto Rico	
13	Loss	12–1	Oscar Andrade	DQ	6 (10), 1:38	Apr 20, 2007	Cicero Stadium, Cicero, Illinois, U.S.	Oquendo disqualified for repeated low blows
12	Win	12–0	Alejandro Montiel	TKO	1 (10), 1:50	Dec 16, 2006	Coliseo Antonio R. Barcelo, Toa Baja, Puerto Rico	
11	Win	11–0	Paulino Villalobos	UD	8	Sep 15, 2006	Aragon Ballroom, Chicago, Illinois, U.S.	
10	Win	10–0	Arturo Bracamontes	TKO	4 (6), 1:10	Jul 15, 2006	MGM Grand Garden Arena, Paradise, Nevada, U.S.	
9	Win	9–0	Torrence Daniels	UD	8	May 6, 2006	MGM Grand Garden Arena, Paradise, Nevada, U.S.	
8	Win	8–0	Terrance Roy	TKO	3 (8), 2:40	Jan 27, 2006	Cicero Stadium, Cicero, Illinois, U.S.	
7	Win	7–0	David Vasquez	KO	2 (6)	Oct 21, 2005	José Miguel Agrelot, San Juan, Puerto Rico	
6	Win	6–0	Elvis Luciano Martinez	UD	6	Sep 1, 2005	Desert Diamond Casino, Tucson, Arizona, U.S.	
5	Win	5–0	Tim Carrizales	TKO	2 (6), 0:37	Jul 16, 2005	MGM Grand Garden Arena, Paradise, Nevada, U.S.	
4	Win	4–0	Alexander Alonzo	UD	4	Apr 29, 2005	Figali Convention Center, Panama City, Panama	
3	Win	3–0	Ray Ryan	TKO	2 (4), 1:52	Mar 11, 2005	Civic Center, Kissimmee, Florida, U.S.	
2	Win	2–0	Robert DaLuz	UD	4	Feb 4, 2005	UNF Arena, Jacksonville, Florida, U.S.	
1	Win	1–0	Yuniel Ramos	TKO	3 (4), 1:37	Jun 25, 2004	Civic Center, Kissimmee, Florida, U.S.	
