= Yonnhy Pérez =

Colombian boxer (born 1979)

Personal information
- Nicknames: El Colombiano ("The Colombian")
- Nationality: Colombian
- Born: 18 January 1979 (age 47) Cartagena, Colombia
- Height: 5 ft 6 in (168 cm)
- Weight: Bantamweight

Boxing career
- Reach: 69 in (175 cm)
- Stance: Orthodox

Boxing record
- Total fights: 23
- Wins: 20
- Win by KO: 14
- Losses: 2
- Draws: 1
Medal record
Representing Colombia
Pan American Games
| Bronze medal – third place | 2003 Santo Domingo | Bantamweight |

Yonnhy Pérez (born 18 January 1979) is a Colombian former professional boxer who competed from 2005 to 2011. He held the IBF bantamweight title from 2009 to 2010, reaching a peak ranking of number three at bantamweight by The Ring magazine in December 2010.

== Professional career ==
Although born in Colombia, Pérez has fought all but one of his professional fights in the United States. He made his debut on 30 July 2005 in Tucson, Arizona at the age of 26. Pérez made a winning start to his career, knocking out Steve Lozoya in the first round.

Pérez faced his biggest challenge on 29 May 2009, when he travelled to Johannesburg, South Africa to fight Silence Mabuza in an IBF Bantamweight title eliminator. Mabuza, a native of Johannesburg, was a former world champion and had only lost to the renowned Mexican Rafael Marquez. Despite trailing on all three scorecards, Pérez was able to knock Mabuza out in the final round.

=== IBF bantamweight champion ===
In his first world title fight Pérez successfully challenged the IBF champion, Joseph Agbeko from Ghana. Agbeko, who in his previous fight defeated Vic Darchinyan, suffered a knockdown (a result of an unintentional headbutt) in the tenth round en route to losing his title to Pérez via a unanimous decision.

On 22 May 2010, Pérez, defending his IBF title for the first time, fought to a majority draw against the unbeaten Mexican Abner Mares. One judge scored the bout 115–113 in favor of Mares while the other two scored it 114–114 even, resulting in Pérez retaining his title. After the fight both boxers claimed that the decision should have gone their way, and both expressed interest in a rematch.

=== Perez vs. Agbeko II ===
Rather than an immediate rematch with Mares, Pérez faced Agbeko for a second time in the first round of Showtime's bantamweight tournament, while Mares faced Darchinyan on 11 December. Pérez went on to lose a unanimous decision to Agbeko in the match, and a technical decision (on accidental cuts) to Darchinyan on 23 April 2011. In March 2012, having not fought since the losses to Agbeko and Darchinyan, Pérez announced his retirement from boxing, citing a lack of motivation to continue in the sport.

== Professional boxing record ==
| 23 fights | 20 wins | 2 losses |
|---|---|---|
| By knockout | 14 | 0 |
| By decision | 6 | 2 |
| Draws | 1 | |

| No. | Result | Record | Opponent | Type | Round, time | Date | Location | Notes |
|---|---|---|---|---|---|---|---|---|
| 23 | Loss | 20–2–1 | (Armenia) Vic Darchinyan | TD | 5 (12), 1:07 | 23 Apr 2011 | (United States) Nokia Theatre L.A. Live, Los Angeles, California, U.S. | For vacant IBO bantamweight title; Unanimous TD after Pérez cut from accidental head clash |
| 22 | Loss | 20–1–1 | (Ghana) Joseph Agbeko | UD | 12 | 11 Dec 2010 | (United States) Emerald Queen Casino, Tacoma, Washington, U.S. | Lost IBF bantamweight title |
| 21 | Draw | 20–0–1 | (Mexico) Abner Mares | MD | 12 | 22 May 2010 | (United States) Staples Center, Los Angeles, California, U.S. | Retained IBF bantamweight title |
| 20 | Win | 20–0 | (Ghana) Joseph Agbeko | UD | 12 | 31 Oct 2009 | (United States) Treasure Island Hotel and Casino, Paradise, Nevada, U.S. | Won IBF bantamweight title |
| 19 | Win | 19–0 | (South Africa) Silence Mabuza | TKO | 12 (12), 1:06 | 29 May 2009 | Springs Indoor Arena, Johannesburg, South Africa | |
| 18 | Win | 18–0 | (United States) David Martinez | TKO | 6 (10), 2:41 | 5 Sep 2008 | (United States) Star of the Desert Arena, Primm, Nevada, U.S. | |
| 17 | Win | 17–0 | (Mexico) Oscar Andrade | UD | 10 | 27 Jun 2008 | (United States) DoubleTree, Ontario, California, U.S. | Won vacant NABF bantamweight title |
| 16 | Win | 16–0 | (Mexico) Manuel Sarabia | UD | 6 | 2 May 2008 | (United States) Home Depot Center, Carson, California, U.S. | |
| 15 | Win | 15–0 | (Mexico) Alex Becerra | KO | 4 (8), 0:39 | 1 Mar 2008 | (United States) Home Depot Center, Carson, California, U.S. | |
| 14 | Win | 14–0 | (Russia) Alexander Fedorov | TKO | 4 (10), 0:44 | 5 Oct 2007 | (United States) Omega Products International, Corona, California, U.S. | |
| 13 | Win | 13–0 | (Colombia) Antonio Maria Cochero Diaz | RTD | 2 (8), 3:00 | 7 Sep 2007 | (United States) Chumash Casino Resort, Santa Ynez, California, U.S. | |
| 12 | Win | 12–0 | (Puerto Rico) José Laureano | TKO | 3 (8), 0:19 | 28 Jul 2007 | (United States) Emerald Queen Casino, Tacoma, Washington, U.S. | |
| 11 | Win | 11–0 | (Mexico) Samuel Lopez | KO | 1 (10), 2:00 | 25 May 2007 | (United States) DoubleTree, Ontario, California, U.S. | Won vacant WBC Continental Americas bantamweight title |
| 10 | Win | 10–0 | (Mexico) Oscar Andrade | UD | 8 | 24 Mar 2007 | (United States) DoubleTree, Ontario, California, U.S. | |
| 9 | Win | 9–0 | (Puerto Rico) Luis Agosto | TKO | 2 (6), 1:08 | 23 Feb 2007 | (United States) DoubleTree, Ontario, California, U.S. | |
| 8 | Win | 8–0 | (Mexico) Arturo Bracamontes | KO | 6 | 20 Nov 2006 | (United States) DoubleTree, Ontario, California, U.S. | |
| 7 | Win | 7–0 | (Mexico) Arturo Bracamontes | UD | 6 | 16 Oct 2006 | (United States) DoubleTree, Ontario, California, U.S. | |
| 6 | Win | 6–0 | (United States) Larry Olvera | TKO | 6 (8), 2:09 | 15 Sep 2006 | (United States) Omega Products International, Corona, California, U.S. | |
| 5 | Win | 5–0 | (Mexico) Israel Navarrete | KO | 2 (6) | 14 Jul 2006 | (United States) Quiet Cannon, Montebello, California, U.S. | |
| 4 | Win | 4–0 | (Mexico) Daniel Quevedo | UD | 6 | 16 Jun 2006 | (United States) Radisson Hotel, Sacramento, California, U.S. | |
| 3 | Win | 3–0 | (Dominican Republic) Edison Morillo | RTD | 1 (6), 3:00 | 19 May 2006 | (United States) Quiet Cannon, Montebello, California, U.S. | |
| 2 | Win | 2–0 | (United States) Leshaun Blair | TKO | 4 (4), 2:09 | 1 Sep 2005 | (United States) Desert Diamond Casino, Tucson, Arizona | |
| 1 | Win | 1–0 | (United States) Steve Lozoya | TKO | 1 (4), 1:52 | 30 Jul 2005 | (United States) Desert Diamond Casino, Tucson, Arizona, U.S. | |

Sporting positions
Regional boxing titles
| Vacant Title last held by Jhonny González | WBC Continental Americas bantamweight champion 25 May 2007 – June 2008; Vacated | Vacant Title next held by Rodrigo Guerrero |
| Vacant Title last held by Alejandro Valdez | NABF bantamweight champion 27 June 2008 – May 2009; Vacated | Vacant Title next held by Mario Macias |
World boxing titles
| Preceded by Joseph Agbeko | IBF bantamweight champion 31 October 2009 – 11 December 2010 | Succeeded by Joseph Agbeko |
