= Jesús Cuellar =

Argentine boxer

Jesús Cuéllar
Personal information
- Nickname: Jinete del KO
- Born: Jesús Marcelo Andrés Cuéllar; 28 December 1986 (age 39) José C. Paz, Buenos Aires, Argentina
- Height: 5 ft 5 1/2 in (166 cm)
- Weight: Featherweight; Super featherweight

Boxing career
- Reach: 69 in (175 cm)
- Stance: Southpaw

Boxing record
- Total fights: 33
- Wins: 29
- Win by KO: 22
- Losses: 4

Jesús Marcelo Andrés Cuéllar (born 28 December 1986) is an Argentine professional boxer. He held the WBA (Regular) featherweight title from 2015 to 2016.

== Amateur career ==
Cuellar had an amateur record of 230 wins and 10 losses, and was a member of the Argentina national team.

== Professional career ==
Cuellar was trained by former world champion and 2012 Trainer of the Year, Robert García.

=== Cuellar vs. Marrero ===
On 23 August 2013, Cuellar defeated Claudio Marrero for the WBA interim featherweight title, in a close fight. Cuellar was the more aggressive fighter and scored a knockdown in the 6th round.

=== Cuellar vs. Mares ===
On 10 December 2016, Cuellar defended his WBA (Regular) featherweight title against Abner Mares who was ranked #6 by the WBA at featherweight. Mares defeated Cuellar via split decision, scoring 117–110, 116-111 and 112–115 on the scorecards.

=== Cuellar vs. Davis ===
After coming off his third loss and 2 years of layoff, Cuellar returned to the ring against Gervonta Davis. On 5 March 2018, the fight was finalized for the vacant WBA (Regular) super featherweight title. And for the fight Cuellar had to move up from featherweight to super featherweight. Prior to the fight, Alberto Machado, the WBA (Super) champion at the same weight class, was inexplicably downgraded to 'Regular' champion, and the Davis-Cuellar fight was upgraded to be for Machado's WBA (Super) super featherweight title. On 21 April 2018, Davis knocked Cuellar down three times en route to a third-round knockout win.

=== Cuellar vs. Fortuna ===
On 2 November 2019, Cuellar faced Javier Fortuna. Cuellar suffered his fourth loss as Fortuna dominated and dropped him twice en route to a second-round knockout win.

== Professional boxing record ==
33 fights	29 wins	4 losses
By knockout	22	3
By decision	7	1

No.	Result	Record	Opponent	Type	Round, time	Date	Location	Notes
33	Loss	29–4	(Dominican Republic) Javier Fortuna	KO	2 (10), 2:01	2 November 2019	(United States) MGM National Harbor, Oxon Hill, Maryland, U.S.	
32	Win	29–3	(Colombia) Carlos Padilla	KO	2 (6), 0:33	9 March 2019	(United States) Dignity Health Sports Park, Carson, California, U.S.	
31	Loss	28–3	(United States) Gervonta Davis	TKO	3 (12), 2:45	21 April 2018	(United States) Barclays Center, New York City, New York, U.S.	For vacant WBA (Super) super featherweight title
30	Loss	28–2	(Mexico) Abner Mares	SD	12	10 December 2016	(United States) Galen Center, Los Angeles, California, U.S.	Lost WBA (Regular) featherweight title
29	Win	28–1	(Puerto Rico) Jonathan Oquendo	UD	12	5 December 2015	(United States) Barclays Center, New York City, New York, U.S.	Retained WBA (Regular) featherweight title
28	Win	27–1	(Armenia) Vic Darchinyan	TKO	8 (12), 1:04	6 June 2015	(United States) StubHub Center, Carson, California, U.S.	Retained WBA (Regular) featherweight title
27	Win	26–1	(Mexico) Ruben Tamayo	TKO	5 (12), 1:48	20 December 2014	(United States) Little Creek Casino Resort, Shelton, Washington, U.S.	Retained WBA interim featherweight title
26	Win	25–1	(Puerto Rico) Juan Manuel López	KO	2 (12), 1:36	11 September 2014	(United States) The Joint, Paradise, Nevada, U.S.	Retained WBA interim featherweight title
25	Win	24–1	(United States) Rico Ramos	UD	12	2 May 2014	(United States) The Joint, Paradise, Nevada, U.S.	Retained WBA interim featherweight title
24	Win	23–1	(Dominican Republic) Claudio Marrero	UD	12	23 August 2013	(United States) Turning Stone Resort Casino, Verona, New York, U.S.	Won vacant WBA interim featherweight title
23	Win	22–1	(Argentina) Gustavo Daniel Gonzalez	TKO	1 (8), 1:58	12 December 2012	Estadio Luna Park, Buenos Aires, Argentina	
22	Win	21–1	(Colombia) Jean Javier Sotelo	TKO	1 (10), 2:59	30 November 2012	Centro Recreativo Municipal Néstor Carlos Kirchner, Mar del Plata, Argentina	
21	Win	20–1	(Argentina) Claudio Rosendo Tapia	KO	2 (10), 0:49	31 August 2012	Centro Recreativo Municipal Néstor Carlos Kirchner, Mar del Plata, Argentina	Retained FAB featherweight title; Won vacant WBA Fedelatin interim featherweight title
20	Win	19–1	(Argentina) Miguel Leonardo Caceres	MD	10	4 February 2012	Centro Recreativo Municipal Néstor Carlos Kirchner, Mar del Plata, Argentina	
19	Win	18–1	(Paraguay) Ramon Elizer Esperanza	TKO	4 (10), 1:20	25 November 2011	Centro Recreativo Municipal Néstor Carlos Kirchner, Mar del Plata, Argentina	
18	Loss	17–1	(Colombia) Óscar Escandón	TKO	7 (12), 2:59	15 October 2011	Centro Recreativo Municipal Néstor Carlos Kirchner, Mar del Plata, Argentina	
17	Win	17–0	(Argentina) Hugo Orlando Gomez	TKO	3 (12), 2:58	23 July 2011	Centro Recreativo Municipal Néstor Carlos Kirchner, Mar del Plata, Argentina	Retained WBO Latino featherweight title
16	Win	16–0	(Argentina) Ramon Armando Torres	KO	4 (10), 1:50	16 April 2011	Centro Recreativo Municipal Néstor Carlos Kirchner, Mar del Plata, Argentina	Won vacant FAB featherweight title
15	Win	15–0	(Argentina) Jose Saez	TKO	2 (12), 1:20	12 January 2011	Centro Recreativo Municipal Néstor Carlos Kirchner, Mar del Plata, Argentina	Retained WBO Latino featherweight title
14	Win	14–0	(Argentina) Diego Herminio Alejandro Sananco	RTD	8 (12), 3:00	23 October 2010	Escuela Tecnica Nº1, Salto, Argentina	Won WBO Latino featherweight title
13	Win	13–0	(Argentina) Miguel Leonardo Caceres	UD	10	21 August 2010	Club Atlético Adelante, Reconquista, Argentina	
12	Win	12–0	(Argentina) Claudio Rosendo Tapia	RTD	11 (12), 1:06	30 April 2010	Asociación Mutual del Club El Tala, San Francisco, Argentina	Retained WBO Latino interim featherweight title
11	Win	11–0	(Argentina) Lucas Rafael Baez	TKO	1 (10), 2:10	27 February 2010	Asociación Española Tiro y Deportiva Jorge Ross, La Carlota, Argentina	
10	Win	10–0	(Argentina) Luis Armando Juarez	UD	12	24 October 2009	Estadio Cubierto Municipal, Deán Funes, Argentina	Won vacant WBO Latino interim featherweight title
9	Win	9–0	(Paraguay) Victor Cardozo Coronel	TKO	9 (10), 1:49	4 September 2009	Club Atléico Jorge Newbery, Maipú, Argentina	
8	Win	8–0	(Argentina) Julio Cesar Ruiz	TKO	3 (10), 1:41	23 May 2009	Club Sarmiento, Dolores, Argentina	
7	Win	7–0	(Argentina) Cristian Javier Olmedo	TKO	3 (6), 0:58	21 March 2009	Club Sportivo, La Calera, Argentina	
6	Win	6–0	(Argentina) Marcelo Antonio Gomez	UD	6	24 January 2009	Casino y Bingo, Villa Carlos Paz, Argentina	
5	Win	5–0	(Argentina) Carlos Alberto Ibarra	TKO	2 (4), 0:07	6 December 2008	Club Social y Deportivo, San Vicente, Argentina	
4	Win	4–0	(Belgium) Pascal Bouchez	KO	1 (4), 2:09	1 November 2008	König Pilsener Arena, Oberhausen, Germany	
3	Win	3–0	(Argentina) Juan Ramon Alfonsin	KO	1 (4), 2:46	2 August 2008	Gimnasio Municipal, Pergamino, Argentina	
2	Win	2–0	(Argentina) Juan Atonio Alcaraz	RTD	1 (4), 3:00	11 July 2008	Club Deportivo Libertad, Sunchales, Argentina	
1	Win	1–0	(Argentina) Cristian Omar Gimenez	TKO	1 (4), 1:52	12 June 2008	Club Social y Deportivo, Mar de Ajó, Argentina	

Sporting positions
Regional boxing titles
New title	WBO Latino featherweight champion Interim title 24 October 2009 – 23 October 2010; Won full title	Vacant Title next held by Juan Manuel López
Vacant Title last held by Jonathan Victor Barros	WBO Latino featherweight champion 23 October 2010 – October 2011; Vacated	Vacant Title next held by Matias Rueda
Vacant Title last held by Jorge Linares	WBA Fedelatin featherweight champion Interim title 31 August 2012 – 23 August 2013; Won interim world title	Vacant
Vacant Title last held by Jonathan Victor Barros	FAB featherweight champion 16 April 2011 – October 2013; Vacated	Vacant Title next held by Matias Rueda
World boxing titles
Vacant Title last held by Javier Fortuna	WBA featherweight champion Interim title 23 August 2013 – 21 February 2015; Promoted	Vacant Title next held by Carlos Zambrano
Vacant Title last held by Nicholas Walters	WBA featherweight champion Regular title 21 February 2015 – 10 December 2016	Succeeded by Abner Mares
