= Abner Mares =

Mexican boxer (born 1985)

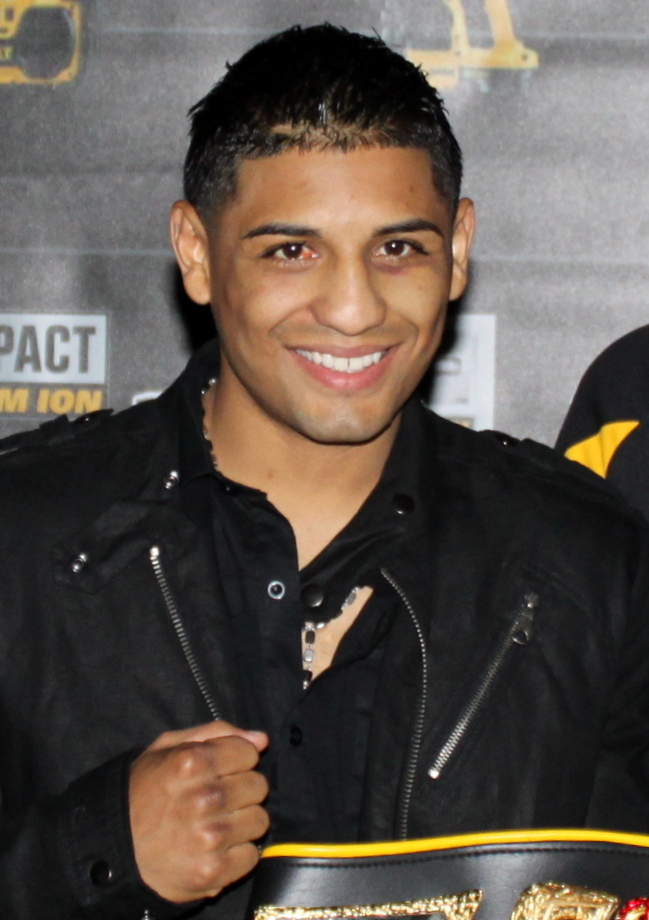
- Mares in 2010

Personal information
- Nationality: Mexican; American
- Born: Abner Mares Martínez; November 28, 1985 (age 40) Guadalajara, Jalisco, Mexico
- Height: 5 ft 4 1/2 in (164 cm)
- Weight: Bantamweight; Super bantamweight; Featherweight; Super featherweight

Boxing career
- Reach: 66 in (168 cm)
- Stance: Orthodox

Boxing record
- Total fights: 36
- Wins: 31
- Win by KO: 15
- Losses: 3
- Draws: 2
Medal record
Men's amateur boxing
Representing Mexico
Central American and Caribbean Games
Gold medal – first place	2002 San Salvador	Bantamweight
Pan American Games
Silver medal – second place	2003 Santo Domingo	Bantamweight

Abner Mares Martínez (born November 28, 1985) is a Mexican-American professional boxer who also works as a boxing analyst and commentator for Showtime. He has held multiple world championships in three weight classes, including the International Boxing Federation (IBF) bantamweight title from 2011 to 2012, the World Boxing Council (WBC) super bantamweight title from 2012 to 2013, the WBC featherweight title in 2013. He also held the World Boxing Association (WBA) (Regular version) featherweight title from 2016 to 2018. As an amateur boxer, Mares won numerous medals at international tournaments while representing Mexico. He grew up in the city of Hawaiian Gardens, California and holds dual citizenship with Mexico and the United States.

== Early life ==
Mares was born in Guadalajara, Jalisco, Mexico and at age seven his family moved to the city of Hawaiian Gardens, California. At age fifteen he was sent back to Mexico by his father.

== Amateur career ==
As an amateur, Mares compiled a record of 112–8 with 84 KOs. Mares won the U17 World Championships and the bantamweight gold medal at the Central American games 2002 beating Juan Manuel López and the silver medal in the same division in 2003 at the Pan American Games in Santo Domingo. At the Junior World Championships 2004, he finished second losing to Aibek Abdimomunov. He participated in the 2004 Summer Olympics for his native country and was defeated in the first round of the Bantamweight (54 kg) division by Hungary's Zsolt Bedák in a highly controversial decision.

=== Amateur highlights ===
- Represented Mexico at the 2004 Olympics in Athens as a Bantamweight, losing in the opening round to Zsolt Bedak of Hungary on points 27–24
- Silver medalist at the 2004 World Junior Championships
- Silver medalist at the 2003 Pan American Games, losing to Guillermo Rigondeaux, with a score of 17 - 7.
- Gold medalist at the 2002 Central American & Caribbean Games
- Gold medalist at the 2002 World Cadet Championships

== Professional career ==
In January 2005, Mares won his professional debut against Puerto Rican Luis Malave.

=== Bantamweight ===
On September 7, 2007, he won the WBO NABA Bantamweight Championship by defeating former WBO Champion Isidro García. Mares won his next three bouts before suffering an eye injury which required him to undergo surgery. He returned to the ring 10 months later by stopping Jonathan Perez. He had been trained as a professional by Hall of Famer Ignacio Beristáin, however, the two split after Mares changed promotional companies.

==== Mares vs. Perez ====
On May 22, 2010, Mares challenged undefeated IBF Bantamweight Champion and the No. 4 ranked Bantamweight Yonnhy Perez (20–0) for his title. The bout ended in a 12-round majority draw with one judge scoring it 115–113 in favor of Mares while the other two scored it 114-114 even. The majority of the press at ringside scored the bout in favor of Mares.

This marked the launch and the climb to success with world-famous trainer, Clemente Medina.

==== Bantamweight Tournament ====
===== Mares vs. Darchinyan =====
Golden Boy Promotions announced that Mares would be taking part in Showtime's four-man single elimination bantamweight tournament, which would also include Vic Darchinyan, Joseph Agbeko and Yonnhy Perez. In the first round of the tournament, Mares faced IBO Bantamweight Champion Vic Darchinyan and defeated him by a highly controversial 12 round split decision to claim the IBO Championship title and WBC Silver title.

===== Mares vs. Agbeko I =====
Mares was scheduled to face IBF Champion and No. 3 ranked Joseph Agbeko in the final round of the tournament on April 23, 2011. However, Agbeko pulled out of the fight just days prior citing an injury. The match was rescheduled for August 13, 2011. Mares fought Agbeko on August 13 on Showtime and won the title and the tournament by majority decision. However, the match was not without controversy, as Mares delivered numerous low blows during the match, with referee Russell Mora not penalizing him with point deductions for any of the blows throughout the match. The most infamous of these blows came during the 11th round of the fight, in which a low blow from Mares landed on Agbeko's cup, causing Agbeko to drop. While the low blow was clearly visible to everyone, referee Mora ruled it as a knockdown.

==== Mares vs. Agbeko II ====
On December 3, 2011, Mares and Agbeko fought a rematch due to their controversial first fight. While the second fight proved to be much less controversial, there were still several low blow warnings from the referee to Mares. Though Agbeko had moments in the fight where he outboxed Mares from the outside, Mares closed the distance and outworked Agbeko throughout the fight, and landed the more significant punches. Mares was awarded a unanimous decision win, by the scores of 118-110 from all three judges. .

=== Super Bantamweight ===
==== Super Bantamweight title ====
In Mares' next fight, he moved up to the super bantamweight division, fighting former world champion Eric Morel for the vacant WBC Super Bantamweight title. The fight took place on April 21, 2012, at a catchweight of 120 lbs. Mares effectively out worked, landed more, and landed the harder punches throughout the fight, with Morel showing significant signs of his age. Mares won a unanimous decision by the scores of 120–107, 119–109, and 119–109 to claim his first Super Bantamweight title.

==== Mares vs. Moreno ====
Mares' next fight took place on November 10, 2012, against the world No. 1 ranked bantamweight and then No.10 pound-for-pound Anselmo Moreno. Mares started the fight off fast, applying relentless pressure on Moreno, forcing Moreno to the ropes for the majority of the early rounds. Moreno still had his moments while the two were in the middle of the ring, landing clean shots, while Mares attempted to out work Moreno and attack his body while on the ropes. In the 5th round, Moreno was having success staying off the ropes when he could, and out boxing Mares in the center of the ring. Near the end of the round, Mares trapped Moreno on the ropes and landed a hard straight right hand, which ultimately sent Moreno to the canvas for the first time in his career. The following middle rounds of the fight, Mares seemed in control working the body and landing his hard overhand right, relentless pressuring Moreno for the majority of the rounds. In the 11th round, Moreno was docked a point for pushing Mares' head down while Mares rushed him on the ropes. This was seen as very controversial, given that Mares and Moreno both had been warned several times throughout the fight and only Moreno was docked a point. After the point deduction, Moreno effectively out pointed Mares in the middle of the ring during the final rounds and even successfully traded with Mares against the ropes, while Mares seemed to tire the final couple rounds.

Mares was awarded the Unanimous decision by the scores of 116–110, 116–110, and 120–106.

=== Featherweight ===
==== Mares vs. De Leon ====
Mares moved up to 126 lbs to fight WBC Featherweight champion and Ring No. 2 ranked Featherweight, Daniel Ponce de León in the Mayweather-Guerrero undercard on May 4, 2013, and knocked down de León in the second and ninth rounds en route to handing him a TKO loss at 2:20 of the ninth round, winning the WBC featherweight title in the process.

==== Mares vs. González ====
Mares defended his WBC Featherweight title against underdog former world champion Jhonny González on August 24, 2013, at the StubHub Center in Carson, California. Mares lost the fight in a first-round TKO to González. The referee stopped the fight after Mares was knocked down for the second time in the first round.

Mares would leave his management company, Espinoza Boxing Club, as well as trainer Clemente Medina. He would train with Virgil Hunter for his next fight before returning to Clemente Medina.

==== Mares vs Cuellar ====
On December 10, 2016, Mares fought Jesus Cuellar for the WBA "regular" featherweight title. Mares won tia fight via split-decision, with two of the judges scoring the fight in his favor, 117-110 and 116-111 while the third judge saw Cuellar as the winner, scoring it 115–112 in favor of the Argentine.

==== Mares vs Gutierrez ====
In his next fight, Mares fought Andres Gutierrez. Mares retained his title be winning the fight via technical decision in the tenth round.

==== Mares vs Santa Cruz ====
On June 9, 2018, Mares fought WBA super featherweight champion Leo Santa Cruz in a long-anticipated rematch. In a brutal and exciting fight, both fighters were throwing and connecting at a similar rate. All three judges agreed on who is the winner of the fight, with all three scoring it in favor Santa Cruz, 117–111, 116-112 and 115–113.

== Professional boxing record ==
36 fights	31 wins	3 losses
By knockout	15	1
By decision	16	2
Draws	2	

No.	Result	Record	Opponent	Type	Round, time	Date	Location	Notes
36	Draw	31–3–2	Miguel Flores	MD	10	Sep 4, 2022	Crypto.com Arena, Los Angeles, California, U.S.	
35	Loss	31–3–1	Léo Santa Cruz	UD	12	Jun 9, 2018	Staples Center, Los Angeles, California, U.S.	For WBA (Super) featherweight title
34	Win	31–2–1	Andrés Gutiérrez	TD	10 (12), 2:40	Oct 14, 2017	StubHub Center, Carson, California, U.S.	Retained WBA (Regular) featherweight title; Unanimous TD: Gutiérrez cut from an accidental head clash
33	Win	30–2–1	Jesús Cuellar	SD	12	Dec 10, 2016	Galen Center, Los Angeles, California, U.S.	Won WBA (Regular) featherweight title
32	Loss	29–2–1	Léo Santa Cruz	MD	12	Aug 29, 2015	Staples Center, Los Angeles, California, U.S.	For vacant WBA (Super) featherweight title
31	Win	29–1–1	Arturo Santos Reyes	UD	10	Mar 7, 2015	MGM Grand Garden Arena, Paradise, Nevada, U.S.	
30	Win	28–1–1	Jose Ramirez	RTD	5 (10), 3:00	Dec 13, 2014	MGM Grand Garden Arena, Paradise, Nevada, U.S.	
29	Win	27–1–1	Jonathan Oquendo	UD	10	Jul 12, 2014	MGM Grand Garden Arena, Paradise, Nevada, U.S.	
28	Loss	26–1–1	Jhonny González	TKO	1 (12), 1:55	Aug 24, 2013	StubHub Center, Carson, California, U.S.	Lost WBC featherweight title
27	Win	26–0–1	Daniel Ponce de León	TKO	9 (12), 2:20	May 4, 2013	MGM Grand Garden Arena, Paradise, Nevada, U.S.	Won WBC featherweight title
26	Win	25–0–1	Anselmo Moreno	UD	12	Nov 10, 2012	Staples Center, Los Angeles, California, U.S.	Retained WBC super bantamweight title
25	Win	24–0–1	Eric Morel	UD	12	Apr 21, 2012	Don Haskins Center, El Paso, Texas, U.S.	Won vacant WBC super bantamweight title
24	Win	23–0–1	Joseph Agbeko	UD	12	Dec 3, 2011	Honda Center, Anaheim, California, U.S.	Retained IBF and WBC Silver bantamweight titles
23	Win	22–0–1	Joseph Agbeko	MD	12	Aug 13, 2011	The Joint, Paradise, Nevada, U.S.	Retained WBC Silver bantamweight title; Won IBF bantamweight title
22	Win	21–0–1	Vic Darchinyan	SD	12	Dec 11, 2010	Emerald Queen Casino, Tacoma, Washington, U.S.	Won IBO and vacant WBC Silver bantamweight titles
21	Draw	20–0–1	Yonnhy Pérez	MD	12	May 22, 2010	Staples Center, Los Angeles, California, U.S.	For IBF bantamweight title
20	Win	20–0	Felipe Almanza	KO	5 (10), 2:23	Mar 25, 2010	Club Nokia, Los Angeles, California, U.S.	
19	Win	19–0	Carlos Fulgencio	KO	6 (8), 2:46	Aug 27, 2009	Club Nokia, Los Angeles, California, U.S.	
18	Win	18–0	Jonathan Perez	RTD	6 (8), 3:00	May 2, 2009	MGM Grand Garden Arena, Paradise, Nevada, U.S.	
17	Win	17–0	Jonathan Arias	UD	10	Jun 27, 2008	Morongo Casino Resort & Spa, Cabazon, California, U.S.	
16	Win	16–0	Diosdado Gabi	TKO	2 (12), 0:49	Mar 15, 2008	Mandalay Bay Events Center, Paradise, Nevada, U.S.	Retained WBO–NABO bantamweight title
15	Win	15–0	Damian David Marchiano	UD	12	Nov 17, 2007	Borgata, Atlantic City, New Jersey, U.S.	Retained WBO–NABO bantamweight title
14	Win	14–0	Isidro García	RTD	7 (12), 3:00	Sep 7, 2007	Desert Diamond Casino, Tucson, Arizona, U.S.	Won vacant WBO–NABO bantamweight title
13	Win	13–0	Saul Gutierrez	UD	6	Jul 6, 2007	Convention Center, McAllen, Texas, U.S.	
12	Win	12–0	Angel Antonio Priolo	TKO	6 (10), 1:56	Apr 20, 2007	Cicero Stadium, Cicero, Illinois, U.S.	
11	Win	11–0	Robert Allanic	RTD	8 (10), 3:00	Mar 2, 2007	New Alhambra Arena, Philadelphia, Pennsylvania, U.S.	
10	Win	10–0	Wilmer Rodriguez	TKO	4 (10), 1:45	Nov 25, 2006	Dodge Arena, Hidalgo, Texas, U.S.	
9	Win	9–0	Kevin Hudgins	UD	8	Sep 15, 2006	Aragon Ballroom, Chicago, Illinois, U.S.	
8	Win	8–0	Omar Adorno	UD	8	Feb 24, 2006	Mandalay Bay Events Center, Paradise, Nevada, U.S.	
7	Win	7–0	Yamin Mohammad	UD	8	Dec 16, 2005	Convention Center, Austin, Texas, U.S.	
6	Win	6–0	Selso Bosquez	TKO	4 (6), 2:35	Sep 17, 2005	MGM Grand Garden Arena, Paradise, Nevada, U.S.	
5	Win	5–0	Elvis Luciano Martinez	TKO	3 (6), 2:45	Jul 16, 2005	MGM Grand Garden Arena, Paradise, Nevada, U.S.	
4	Win	4–0	Baladan Trevizo	TKO	5 (6), 1:15	Jun 16, 2005	Sundance Square, Fort Worth, Texas, U.S.	
3	Win	3–0	David Vasquez	UD	6	Apr 29, 2005	Entertainment Center, Laredo, Texas, U.S.	
2	Win	2–0	Francisco Soto	KO	5 (6), 2:47	Feb 19, 2005	Staples Center, Los Angeles, California, U.S.	
1	Win	1–0	Luis Malave	TKO	2 (6), 2:00	Jan 6, 2005	Desert Diamond Casino, Tucson, Arizona, U.S.	

== Titles in boxing ==
=== Major world titles ===
- IBF bantamweight champion (118 lbs)
- WBC super bantamweight champion (122 lbs)
- WBC featherweight champion (126 lbs)

=== Secondary major world titles (Note: The secondary champion lineage lists the Regular or Unified champions while the primary champion is occupied.) ===
- WBA (Regular) featherweight champion (Note: Secondary champion from December 10, 2016 – June 9, 2018, but was never considered the primary champion.) (126 lbs)

=== Silver world titles (Note: In 2010, the WBC created the "Silver Championship", intended as a replacement for interim titles.) ===
- WBC Silver bantamweight champion (118 lbs)

=== Minor world titles ===
- IBO bantamweight champion (118 lbs)

=== Regional/International titles ===
- NABO bantamweight champion (118 lbs)

== See also ==
- List of Mexican boxing world champions

== Notes and references ==
=== Video references ===
Sporting positions
Regional boxing titles
Vacant Title last held by Jhonny González	WBO–NABO bantamweight champion September 7, 2007 – June 2008; Vacated	Vacant Title next held by Christopher Avalos
Vacant Title last held by Christian Esquivel	WBC Silver bantamweight champion December 11, 2010 – April 21, 2012; Vacated	Vacant Title next held by Tomoki Kameda
Minor world boxing titles
Vacant Title last held by Vic Darchinyan	IBO bantamweight champion December 11, 2010 – April 2011; Vacated	Vacant Title next held by Vic Darchinyan
Major world boxing titles
Preceded by Joseph Agbeko	IBF bantamweight champion August 13, 2011 – February 8, 2012; Vacated	Vacant Title next held by Léo Santa Cruz
Vacant Title last held by Toshiaki Nishioka	WBC super bantamweight champion April 21, 2012 – January 31, 2013; Vacated	Vacant Title next held by Victor Terrazas
Preceded by Daniel Ponce de León	WBC featherweight champion May 4, 2013 – August 24, 2013	Succeeded by Jhonny González
Preceded by Jesús Cuellar	WBA featherweight champion Regular title December 10, 2016 – June 9, 2018; Vacant after loss to Santa Cruz	Vacant Title next held by Jesús Rojas
