= Joseph Agbeko vs. Abner Mares =

Boxing match

Winner Takes All
- Date: August 13, 2011
- Venue: The Joint, Paradise, Nevada, U.S.
- Title(s) on the line: IBF and WBC Silver bantamweight titles

Tale of the tape
Boxer	(Ghana) Joseph Agbeko	(Mexico) Abner Mares
Nickname	"King Kong"	
Hometown	Accra, Greater Accra, Ghana	Guadalajara, Jalisco, Mexico
Pre-fight record	28–2 (22 KO)	21–0–1 (13 KO)
Age	31 years, 4 months	25 years, 8 months
Height	5 ft 6 in (168 cm)	5 ft 4 1/2 in (164 cm)
Weight	118 lb (54 kg)	117 1/2 lb (53 kg)
Style	Orthodox	Orthodox
Recognition	IBF; Bantamweight Champion; The Ring; No. 3 Ranked Bantamweight	IBF/The Ring; No. 4 Ranked Bantamweight; WBC Silver bantamweight champion

Result
- Mares defeats Agbeko by majority decision

Joseph Agbeko vs. Abner Mares, was a professional boxing match contested on August 13, 2011, for the IBF bantamweight championship.

== Background ==
The bout was held at Hard Rock Hotel and Casino, Las Vegas, Nevada, United States, and was televised on Showtime. It was billed as the Final Showtime's Bantamweight Tournament and originally planned for April 23, however, Agbeko pulled out of the fight just days prior, citing an injury, and the fight was rescheduled for August 13.

== The fight ==
The bout was marred in controversy due to the prevalence of low blows by Mares that went unpenalized by referee Russell Mora. The most infamous of these came during the 11th round, in which a low blow from Mares landed on Agbeko's cup, causing Agbeko to drop. While the low blow was clearly visible to everyone, referee Mora ruled it as a knockdown.

== Aftermath ==
Post fight, Jim Gray interviewed Mora where he denied it was low saying "First and foremost, I have to enforce the rules. Those punches were on the beltline. It's a fair punch. I have to call it fair. It would be unfair to give the other guy an advantage just because he says it's low. I saw the punch. It's on the beltline. I gotta call that a fair punch." Gray then plainly showed the crucial call that turned the fight, a low blow in the 11th leading to a knockdown, however Mora again denied that the clear low blow was low "It sure...it has a different viewpoint from looking at here in slow motion. When I saw it live, I saw that it was a fair punch on the beltline. That was my call."

Three days after the bout the IBF ordered an immediate rematch.

== Main card ==
Confirmed bouts:

- Bantamweight Championship (Mexico) Abner Mares vs. (Ghana) Joseph Agbeko
  - Mares defeats Agbeko via majority decision. (115-111, 113-113, 115–111)

=== Preliminary card ===
- Bantamweight bout (Puerto Rico) Eric Morel vs. (Mexico) Daniel Quevedo
  - Morel defeats Quevedo via technical knockout (retirement) at 3:00 of fourth round
- Light Welterweight bout (United States) Carlos Molina vs. (Mexico) Juan Montiel
  - Bout was ruled a split decision draw. (78-74, 76-76, 74–77)
- Heavyweight bout (United States) Éric Molina vs. (United States) Warren Browning
  - Molina defeats Browining via technical knockout at 0:24 of third round
- Light Welterweight bout (Cuba) Angelo Santana vs. (Russia) Ramzan Adaev
  - Santana defeats Adaev via technical knockout at 2:02 of second round.

== Broadcasting ==
Country	Broadcaster
United States	Showtime

Preceded by vs. Yonnhy Pérez	Joseph Agbeko's bouts August 13, 2011	Succeeded by Rematch
Preceded by vs. Vic Darchinyan	Abner Mares' bouts August 13, 2011	Succeeded by Rematch
