= Carlos Zambrano (boxer) =

Peruvian boxer

Personal information
- Born: Carlos Zambrano Córdova; July 12, 1984 (age 41) Chincha Alta, Peru
- Height: 5 ft 7 1/2 in (171 cm)
- Weight: Featherweight

Boxing career
- Reach: 69 in (175 cm)
- Stance: Orthodox

Boxing record
- Total fights: 29
- Wins: 27
- Win by KO: 11
- Losses: 2

Carlos Zambrano Córdova (born July 12, 1984) is a Peruvian former professional boxer. He had an amateur record of 288 wins and 6 defeats (288-6-0).

== Professional career ==
As a professional, Zambrano won the WBA interim featherweight title from Daniel Ramirez on March 28, 2015, and successfully defended it against Jose Sanmartin on August 1, 2015. He would lose the belt against Claudio Marrero on April 29, 2017. The vacant IBO featherweight title was also on the line in that bout. He would also lose his next fight against Puerto Rican Bryan Chevalier.

== Professional boxing record ==
29 fights	27 wins	2 losses
By knockout	11	2
By decision	16	0

No.	Result	Record	Opponent	Type	Round, time	Date	Location	Notes
29	Win	27–2	Luis Colmenares	UD	6	18-09-2021	Punta Hermosa, Peru	
28	Loss	26–2	Bryan Chevalier	KO	3 (8), 2:21	04-03-2021	Municipal Boxing Gym, Guaynabo, Puerto Rico	
27	Loss	26–1	Claudio Marrero	KO	1 (12), 1:30	29-04-2017	Sam's Town Hotel, Las Vegas, Nevada, U.S.	Lost interim WBA featherweight title, for IBO featherweight title
26	Win	26–0	Jose Sanmartin	UD	12	01-08-2015	Coliseo Cerrado Mauro Mina, Chincha Alta, Peru	Retained interim WBA World featherweight title
25	Win	25–0	Daniel Ramirez	UD	12	28-03-2015	Mega Plaza Norte, Lima, Peru	Won interim WBA World featherweight title
24	Win	24–0	Stalin Moran	UD	4	30-08-2014	Complejo Deportivo, Huarochirí, Peru	
23	Win	23–0	Devis Perez	KO	11 (11)	08-03-2014	Coliseo Eduardo Dibos, Lima, Peru	Won vacant WBA Fedelatin featherweight title
22	Win	22–0	Santos Marimon	TKO	5 (8), 0:49	26-10-2013	Coliseo Cerrado Mauro Mina, Chincha Alta, Peru	
21	Win	21–0	Eder Espitia	UD	8	28-09-2013	Mega Plaza Norte, Lima, Peru	
20	Win	20–0	Victor Coronado	UD	8	25-05-2013	Coliseo Cerrado Mauro Mina, Chincha Alta, Peru	
19	Win	19–0	Edilson Rio	UD	8	16-03-2013	Coliseo Miguel Grau, Callao, Peru	
18	Win	18–0	Jose Miguel Payares	TKO	7 (8)	08-12-2012	Centro Cívico de Comas, Lima, Peru	
17	Win	17–0	Diego Alberto Chaves	UD	10	27-10-2012	Coliseo Cerrado Mauro Mina, Chincha Alta, Peru	
16	Win	16–0	Alvaro Marimon	UD	9	18-08-2012	Coliseo Miguel Grau, Callao, Peru	
15	Win	15–0	Darli Goncalves Pires	UD	8	23-06-2012	Coliseo Miguel Grau, Callao, Peru	
14	Win	14–0	Willy Condor	TKO	3 (6)	14-04-2012	Coliseo Eduardo Dibos, Lima, Peru	
13	Win	13–0	Roberto Santos de Jesus	KO	2 (10)	16-04-2011	Estadio Monumental, Lima, Peru	
12	Win	12–0	Lante Addy	TKO	8 (10), 2:44	16-10-2010	Washington School, Union City, New Jersey, U.S.	
11	Win	11–0	Ramon Elizer Esperanza	TKO	1 (10), 2:35	26-06-2010	Jockey Club, Lima, Peru	
10	Win	10–0	Oscar Carrillo Villa	KO	1 (8), 2:26	27-02-2010	Coliseo Niño Heroe Manuel Bonilla, Lima, Peru	
9	Win	9–0	Carlos Francis Hernandez	MD	8	05-12-2009	Citizens Business Bank Arena, Ontario, California, U.S.	
8	Win	8–0	Jason Rorie	UD	6	18-09-2009	PAL Gym, Yonkers, New York, U.S.	
7	Win	7–0	Carlos De Jesus	TKO	2 (6)	20-06-2009	Coliseo Eduardo Dibos, Lima, Peru	
6	Win	6–0	Angel Lopez	TKO	4 (4)	15-05-2009	Yonkers Armory, Yonkers, New York, U.S.	
5	Win	5–0	Javier Dennis	KO	1 (4), 0:59	25-02-2009	Medieval Times, Lyndhurst, New Jersey, U.S.	
4	Win	4–0	Soumana Nandou Abdoulaye	UD	4	29-10-2008	Medieval Times, Lyndhurst, New Jersey, U.S.	
3	Win	3–0	Rasool Shakoor	UD	4	03-10-2008	The Blue Horizon, Philadelphia, Pennsylvania, U.S.	
2	Win	2–0	Soumana Nandou Abdoulaye	UD	4	06-08-2008	Aviator Sports and Events Center, Brooklyn, New York, U.S.	
1	Win	1–0	Jose L Guzman	UD	4	31-01-2008	Utopia Paradise Theatre, Bronx, New York, U.S.	

Sporting positions
Regional boxing titles
Vacant Title last held by Sergio Manuel Medina	South American featherweight champion October 27, 2012 – 2013; Vacated	Vacant Title next held by Roman Ruben Reynoso
Vacant Title last held by Claudio Marrero	WBA Fedelatin featherweight champion March 8, 2014 – March 28, 2015; Won interim title	Vacant Title next held by Nicolas Polanco
World boxing titles
Vacant Title last held by Jesús Cuellar	WBA featherweight champion Interim title March 28, 2015 – April 29, 2017	Succeeded by Claudio Marrero
