= Diplomat Resort & Spa Hollywood =

Hotel in Hollywood, Florida, US

Coordinates: 25.9917°N 80.1180°W

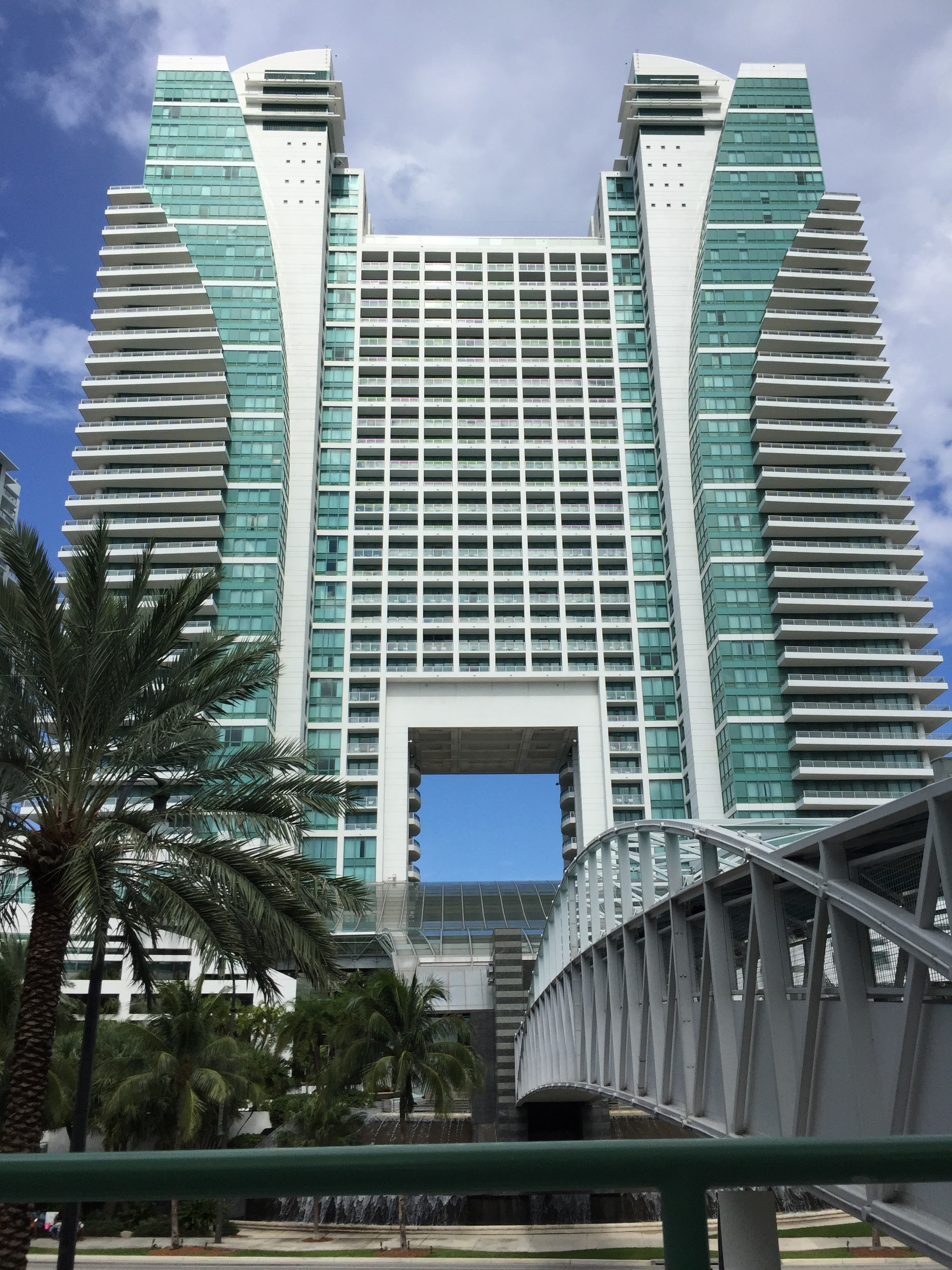
Diplomat Hotel and Spa in Hollywood, Florida

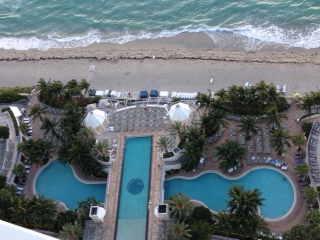
Pools and Beach at Diplomat Resort & Spa (View from 34th Floor)

The Diplomat Beach Resort Hollywood, Curio Collection by Hilton, is a beachfront resort located in Hollywood, Florida (just south of Fort Lauderdale), between the Atlantic Ocean and the Intercoastal Waterway. The hotel has two 36-stories towers with 1,000 rooms, two pools, six restaurants and lounges, beachfront location and a convention center. The Diplomat is currently owned by Thayer Lodging Group and is operated under Hilton Worldwide.

== History ==
The Diplomat Hotel/Motel was opened in 1958. It was the only hotel in its time that was located between Miami and Fort Lauderdale. Grocery store magnate Samuel N. Friedland, who founded the Food Fair chain, opened the 150-room hotel named "The Envoy." He later expanded the hotel to 350 rooms and named it "The Diplomat." Soon, the Diplomat Hotel was a successful hotel in the Hollywood Area. Hollywood celebrities which include Bing Crosby, Maurice Chevalier, Woody Allen and more stayed at the Diplomat Hotel. Harry Truman also took visits to the Diplomat. In 1984, Bob Hope and Ronald Reagan visited the Diplomat as well. Due to financial problems, The Diplomat was closed and sold to the pension fund of the United Association of Journeymen and Apprentices of the Plumbing and Pipe Fitting Industry of the United States and Canada. The Diplomat was shuttered in 1991 and demolished in 1998.

== Westin Diplomat ==
After the acquisition, Diplomat Properties, Ltd. brought in Nichols Architects (Nichols Brosch Sandoval & Associates at the time) to design the new 1,000-room convention center hotel. With the promise of a return to the glory days, by 1998 the new hotel had already booked 15 conventions through 2005, but delays in construction and permitting process postponed the hotel opening.

After much anticipation, the new Westin Diplomat Resort and Spa finally opened in 2002, with nearly 3M total square foot. It featured 998 guestrooms (including 100 suites), a 240-foot, lagoon-style pool, an Executive Club Lounge on the 33rd floor and several dining options. The adjacent 209,000 square-foot Convention Center features a 50,000 square-foot unobstructed Great Hall and four ballrooms, the largest also boasting a window with an ocean view that is 20-feet tall and 150-feet across.

The construction cost of the Westin Diplomat is estimated at $800 million. On August 29, 2014, Thayer Lodging Group bought the Westin Diplomat Resort and Spa for $535 million. In 2023, the hotel changed hands again when Trinity Real Estate Investments and Credit Suisse Asset Management acquired the hotel by a record-breaking $835 million deal. Part of the site is expected to be redeveloped and the hotel is currently operating under Hilton's Curio franchise.
