= Charles Huerta =

American boxer

Personal information
- Nationality: Mexican American
- Born: Charles Huerta; August 7, 1986 (age 39) Paramount, California
- Height: 5 ft 8 in (173 cm)
- Weight: Super Featherweight; Featherweight

Boxing career
- Reach: 70 in (178 cm)
- Stance: Orthodox

Boxing record
- Total fights: 28
- Wins: 21
- Win by KO: 12
- Losses: 7
- Draws: 0
- No contests: 0

Charles Huerta (born August 7, 1986) is an American professional boxer.

== Professional career ==
Huerta began his professional career with a win by TKO in the sixth round over Yoshifumi Momoki in an event hosted in the Marriott Hotel in Irvine, California.

On July 23, 2010 Huerta stopped veteran Jonathan Arias by knockout in the sixth round, the fight was shown on Telefutura.
