= Eden Sonsona =

Filipino boxer (born 1988)

Personal information
- Nickname: Manila's Golden Boy
- Nationality: Filipino
- Born: Eden Baja Sonsona; December 27, 1988 (age 37) Bula, General Santos, Philippines
- Height: 5 ft 5 in (1.65 m)
- Weight: Bantamweight; Super bantamweight; Super featherweight

Boxing career
- Stance: Southpaw

Boxing record
- Total fights: 50
- Wins: 36
- Win by KO: 13
- Losses: 12
- Draws: 2

Eden Baja Sonsona (born December 27, 1988) is a Filipino professional boxer. He previously held the WBC and WBF International super featherweight titles, and the GAB Philippine bantamweight title.

He is a cousin of fellow boxer Marvin Sonsona.

== Professional career ==
On his seventeenth professional bout on November 14, 2009, Sonsona made his U.S. debut on the undercard of Manny Pacquiao vs. Miguel Cotto, where he defeated Israeli Eilon Kedem via second-round technical knockout (TKO) at the MGM Grand in Las Vegas. In the following month, his first-round knockout of Monico Laurente won him the vacant Philippine bantamweight title. He then defeated Colombian former world champion Mauricio Pastrana by eighth-round TKO on the undercard of Pacquiao vs. Joshua Clottey in March 2010. However, in his subsequent match in July, he was knocked out by Jonathan Oquendo of Puerto Rico in their battle for the vacant WBO-NABO super bantamweight title.

Sonsona won seven of his nine subsequent fights before he won the vacant WBC International super featherweight title through his second-round TKO of then-unbeaten Adrián Estrella of Mexico on May 17, 2015. This was followed by a majority decision win over Jaime Barcelona in December 2016, before securing the vacant WBF International super featherweight title by first-round TKO win over compatriot Jovany Rota on February 26, 2017. He then challenged the undefeated Russian WBO Inter-Continental super featherweight champion Evgeny Chuprakov for a May 5 bout. Sonsona lost the match by a fifth-round TKO, ending the 12-fight unbeaten streak he maintained over the last 7 years.

In 2018, Sonsona lost his second rematch with Barcelona via unanimous decision. On March 17, 2021, he lost to Rimar Metuda.

== Controversies ==
On June 19, 2021, Sonsona was arrested for selling methamphetamine during a buy-bust operation in General Santos. The police say he was under surveillance for several months before his arrest.

== Professional boxing record ==
52 fights	36 wins	14 losses
By knockout	13	7
By decision	23	7
Draws	2	

No.	Result	Record	Opponent	Type	Round, time	Date	Location	Notes
52	Loss	36–14–2	Rimar Metuda	KO	3 (6) 1:44	17 Mar 2021	General Santos, Philippines	
51	Loss	36–13–2	Marlon Tapales	TKO	2 (10), 0:46	21 Nov 2020	Sanman Gym, General Santos, Philippines	
50	Loss	36–12–2	Adones Aguelo	TKO	4 (10), 2:39	16 Oct 2019	Calbayog City Sports Center, Calbayog, Philippines	For vacant PBF lightweight title
49	Loss	36–11–2	Jaime Barcelona	SD	10	31 Aug 2019	Siargao, Philippines	
48	Loss	36–10–2	Jaime Barcelona	UD	8	24 Nov 2018	Kitaotao, Bukidnon, Philippines	
47	Loss	36–9–2	Ravshanbek Umurzakov	KO	1 (8), 0:58	19 Aug 2018	DIVS, Yekaterinburg, Russia	
46	Loss	36–8–2	Jaime Barcelona	MD	6	9 Sep 2017	Polomolok Gym, Polomolok, South Cotabato, Philippines	
45	Loss	36–7–2	Evgeny Chuprakov	TKO	5 (10), 1:35	5 May 2017	DIVS, Yekaterinburg, Russia	For WBO Inter-Continental super featherweight title
44	Win	36–6–2	Jovany Rota	TKO	1 (10), 1:41	26 Feb 2017	Lagao Gym, General Santos, Philippines	Won vacant WBF (Federation) International super featherweight title
43	Win	35–6–2	Jaime Barcelona	MD	8	4 Dec 2016	Robinsons Mall Atrium, General Santos, Philippines	
42	Win	34–6–2	Adrián Estrella	TKO	2 (12), 0:27	16 May 2015	Auditorio Miguel Barragán, San Luis Potosí, Mexico	Won vacant WBC International Silver super featherweight title
41	Win	33–6–2	Rex Olisa	TKO	1 (10), 1:46	6 Mar 2015	Paseo Commercial Center, Santa Rosa, Laguna, Philippines	
40	Draw	32–6–2	Bernabe Concepcion	TD	3 (10), 2:22	26 Jul 2014	Mandaluyong Gym, Mandaluyong Sports Center, Mandaluyong, Philippines	Fight stopped due to a cut on Concepcion's right eyelid caused by an accidental headbutt in round 3
39	Draw	32–6–1	Daniel Ferreras	TD	4 (10), 2:02	27 Jul 2013	Barangay San Dionisio Covered Court, Parañaque, Philippines	Fight stopped due to a cut on Ferreras' forehead caused by an accidental headbutt
38	Win	32–6	Mark Sales	UD	10	22 Dec 2012	Iba Town Gymnasium, Iba, Zambales, Philippines	
37	Win	31–6	Eric Rapada	UD	10	30 Oct 2012	San Juan Gym, Taytay, Rizal, Philippines	
36	Win	30–6	Petchnamnung Sithsaithong	KO	2 (10), 1:54	3 Jul 2012	Mandaluyong Gym, Mandaluyong Sports Center, Mandaluyong, Philippines	
35	Win	29–6	Joas Apericio	TKO	3 (10), 2:17	3 Jul 2012	Dipolog City Convention & Sports Center, Dipolog, Philippines	
34	Win	28–6	Gadwin Tubigon	RTD	6 (10), 3:00	1 Oct 2011	Hoops Dome, Lapu-Lapu City, Philippines	
33	Win	27–6	Eman Labanza	MD	10	6 Aug 2011	Mandaue City Sports & Cultural Complex, Mandaue, Philippines	
32	Loss	26–6	Jonathan Oquendo	KO	9 (10), 1:05	10 Jul 2010	Coliseo José Miguel Agrelot, San Juan, Puerto Rico	For vacant WBO-NABO super bantamweight title; WBO super bantamweight title eliminator
31	Win	26–5	Mauricio Pastrana	KO	8 (8), 1:33	13 Mar 2010	Cowboys Stadium, Arlington, Texas, U.S.	
30	Win	25–5	Monico Laurente	KO	1 (12), 0:45	12 Dec 2009	Ynares Sports Arena, Pasig, Philippines	Won vacant Philippines GAB bantamweight title
29	Win	24–5	Eilon Kedem	TKO	2 (6), 0:27	14 Nov 2009	MGM Grand Garden Arena, Paradise, Nevada, U.S.	
28	Win	23–5	Nino Magboo	UD	10	15 Aug 2009	Ynares Plaza Gymnasium (Covered Court), Binangonan, Rizal, Philippines	
27	Win	22–5	Jhunriel Ramonal	TKO	1 (10), 2:00	13 May 2009	Biñan Town Plaza, Biñan, Philippines	
26	Win	21–5	Anthony Esmedina	UD	10	4 Apr 2009	Xavera Community Complex, Mabalacat, Philippines	
25	Loss	20–5	Pungluang Sor Singyu	UD	10	6 Feb 2009	The Office of Pak Hai District, Phra Nakhon Si Ayutthaya, Thailand	For WBC Youth bantamweight title
24	Win	20–4	Lowie Bantigue	UD	10	24 Aug 2008	Gapan Gymnasium, Gapan, Philippines	
23	Win	19–4	Celso Danggod	UD	10	27 Jul 2008	Agoncillo Covered Court, Agoncillo, Batangas, Philippines	
22	Loss	18–4	Richard Olisa	SD	12	21 Apr 2008	Lapu-Lapu City Auditorium, Lapu-Lapu City, Philippines	Lost Philippines GAB super flyweight title
21	Loss	18–3	Silence Mabuza	RTD	8 (12), 3:00	2 Feb 2008	Emperors Palace, Kempton Park, South Africa	For IBO bantamweight title
20	Win	18–2	Celso Danggod	TKO	5 (10), 2:32	8 Dec 2007	Palawan Provincial Gym, Puerto Princesa, Philippines	
19	Loss	17–2	Kohei Kono	SD	12	6 Oct 2007	Korakuen Hall, Tokyo, Japan	For vacant OPBF super flyweight title
18	Win	17–1	Eric Rapada	UD	10	7 Jul 2007	Ynares Plaza Gymnasium, Binangonan, Rizal, Philippines	
17	Win	16–1	Marvin Tampus	TD	10 (12), 3:00	21 Apr 2007	Ynares Plaza Gymnasium, Binangonan, Rizal, Philippines	Philippines GAB super flyweight title at stake; Unanimous TD; Fight stopped due to a cut on Tampus' right eyelid caused by an accident headbutt in round 10
16	Win	15–1	Robert Allanic	TD	6 (12), 1:43	9 Dec 2006	Ynares Plaza Gymnasium, Binangonan, Rizal, Philippines	Philippines GAB super flyweight title at stake; Fight stopped due to a cut on Allanic's left eyebrow caused by an accidental headbutt in round 6
15	Win	14–1	Jerope Mercado	TKO	9 (12), 1:22	14 Oct 2006	Mandaue City Sports & Cultural Complex, Mandaue, Philippines	Retained Philippines GAB super flyweight title
14	Win	13–1	Joel Escol	SD	10	22 Jul 2006	Ynares Plaza Gymnasium, Binangonan, Rizal, Philippines	
13	Win	12–1	Eric Barcelona	SD	12	20 May 2006	Ynares Plaza Gymnasium, Binangonan, Rizal, Philippines	Won Philippines GAB super flyweight title
12	Win	11–1	Edgar Gabejan	UD	10	17 Mar 2006	Tomas D. Dacayo Community Center, Solano, Nueva Vizcaya, Philippines	
11	Win	10–1	Aljun Salogaol	UD	10	9 Feb 2006	Mandaluyong Gym, Mandaluyong Sports Center, Mandaluyong, Philippines	
10	Win	9–1	Isidro Balabat	UD	8	10 Dec 2005	St. Lucia East Mall, Cainta, Rizal, Philippines	
9	Win	8–1	Roberto Lerio	TD	5 (8), 1:48	8 Nov 2005	Cantada Sports Center, Bagumbayan, Taguig, Philippines	Unanimous TD; Fight stopped due to a cut above Lerio's left eyebrow caused by an accidental headbutt
8	Loss	7–1	Mario Jun de Asis	TD	7 (8,) 0:29	27 Aug 2005	Mandaluyong Gym, Mandaluyong Sports Center, Mandaluyong, Philippines	
7	Win	7–0	Rosano Miranda	TKO	4 (6), 2:35	30 Jul 2005	San Andres Civic & Sports Center, Malate, Manila, Philippines	
6	Win	6–0	Renato Nival	UD	6	6 May 2005	Rajah Sulayman Park, Malate, Manila, Philippines	
5	Win	5–0	Rommel Bongon	SD	6	12 Feb 2005	Mandaluyong Gym, Mandaluyong Sports Center, Mandaluyong, Philippines	
4	Win	4–0	Bryan Vicera	UD	4	30 Dec 2004	Mandaluyong Gym, Mandaluyong Sports Center, Mandaluyong, Philippines	
3	Win	3–0	Manny Mansad	UD	4	5 Dec 2004	San Juan Gym, Taytay, Rizal, Philippines	
2	Win	2–0	Cristo Demejillo	UD	4	26 Sep 2004	Taytay Gym, Taytay, Rizal, Philippines	
1	Win	1–0	Christopher Bolcio	SD	4	14 Aug 2004	CCDC Gym, Barangay Poblacion, La Trinidad, Benguet, Philippines	
