= Battle at the Boat =

The Battle at the Boat was the longest running professional boxing series at any tribal casino in the United States, beginning in 1997 and continuing until 2020. In its 20+ years, The Battle at the Boat hosted over 120 fights, including five world title bouts. Fights have been broadcast on SHOWTIME, HBO, ESPN, ESPN2, FOX Sports Net, TV Azteca, and Telemundo.

In 1997, the Emerald Queen Casino and Brian Halquist Productions started the Northwest boxing series, The Battle at the Boat, in Tacoma, Washington. The boxing series was given its name because it began in the original Emerald Queen Casino, which was housed in a paddlewheel riverboat at the time. It has since moved to the I-5 entertainment venue location of the Emerald Queen Casino.
