= Concha Acústica (Ciudad del Carmen) =

Arena in Campeche

Coordinates: 18°39′49″N 91°50′23″W

The Concha Acústica (lit. 'Acoustic Shell') is an outdoor auditorium located in Ciudad del Carmen, Campeche, used primarily for concerts, sporting events, lucha libre, graduation ceremonies and other special events. It started construction in 2023 after the demolition of its predecessor, the Domo del Mar, and was inaugurated in April 2024.

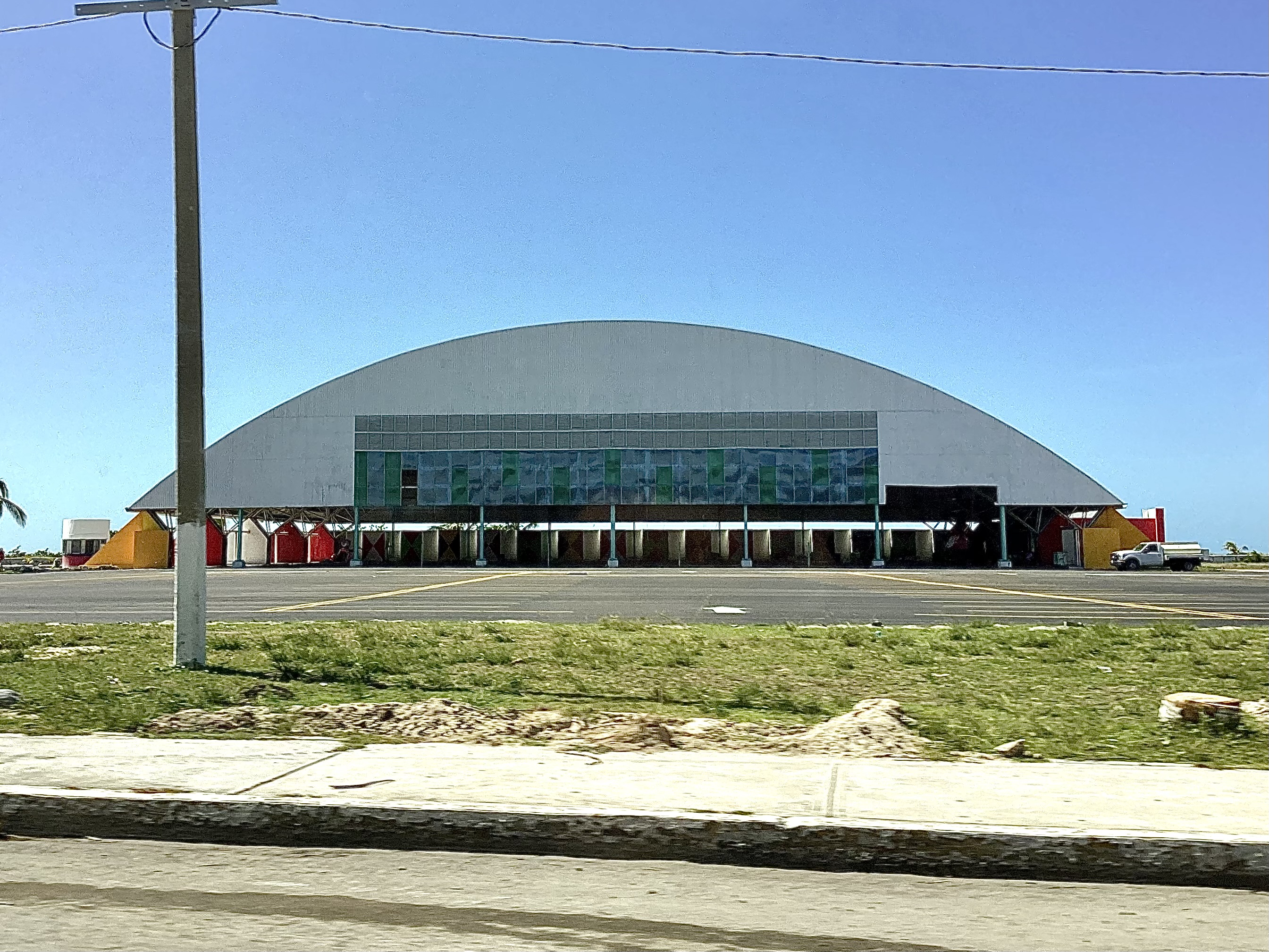
The former Domo del Mar in July 2023

The Domo del Mar was an 40.000 seat auditorium located in the area that is now the Concha Acústica. It was inaugurated in 2003, and was a popular venue for boxing, having hosted numerous matches, some of which have been televised, having hosted concerts from stars like Alejandra Guzman, RBD, Paulina Rubio, Joan Sebastian, Molotov, Los Tigres del Norte and Maná.

Its process of demolition to make way for a new concert venue started in August 2023, and the new venue was finally built to make way for the Feria Carmen 2024 (the city’s local fair).
