= 2014 in Philippine sports =

The following is a list of notable events that are related to Philippine sports in 2014.

== Events ==
- January 18: ABS-CBN's new UHF sports channel on Channel 23, ABS-CBN Sports+Action, was officially launched.
- February 7: Shell Eco-Marathon was held at the Rizal Park. 109 teams from countries across Asia and the Middle East competed for a vehicle that can travel farthest by using the least amount of fuel.
- April 10: The Philippine Basketball Association (PBA) board formally approved the application letters of the three new expansion teams, including the NLEX Road Warriors (under Metro Pacific Tollways Corporation) and Blackwater Sports (under Ever Bilena) which previously played for the PBA D-League and Kia Motors (under Columbian Autocars Corporation). These teams will be start playing for the 2014–2015 season of the PBA.
- April 26: The first NBA Cafe in the world located at the top floor of SM Aura Premier, Taguig was opened to the public. US Ambassador to the Philippines Philip Goldberg and Gordon Hayward of the Utah Jazz present on its opening.
- April 30: Businessman and sports patron Manuel V. Pangilinan announced his interest to buy the minority stake of Los Angeles Clippers amid the impose of the association of lifetime ban for team owner Donald Sterling due to racist comments. But the plan did not push through after former Microsoft CEO Steve Ballmer acquired the ownership of the team on May 30.
- May 10:
  - In the rankings by FIFA, the ranking of the Philippine Azkals was now up by 3 notches; due to this, the Philippine national football team is now at the 140th place.
  - Twenty teams composing of poor communities in Metro Manila head-to-head in the first Ambassador's Cup organized by the University of Asia and the Pacific. Served as a grassroots project, the cup will help children learn from playing football.
- May 14: The University Athletic Association of the Philippines (UAAP) board have submitted the proposal to foreign players in playing for the Basketball tournament to be implemented in the following season. Foreign players who have residency will still be allowed to play in the collegiate league.
- May 15–17: The University of Santo Tomas together with the International Korfball Federation was held the IKF Level 1 Coaching Certification for Sports Leaders of Universities and Schools and 2014 National Korfball Seminar-Workshop at the UST Quadricentennial Pavilion, España, Manila.
- May 26: Committee Report No. 27 on House Bill No. 4084 on the naturalization of NBA player Andray Blatche as a Filipino citizen passed the third and final reading of the Senate with 20 affirmative votes. Blatche will settle to play for Gilas Pilipinas for the 2014 FIBA World Cup.
- May 30: Former PBA broadcast analyst and Talk N' Text Tropang Texters consultant Andy Jao named as the newly appointed commissioner for the basketball tournament of the UAAP Season 77 which the University of the East is the host university for the season. Jao once held duties as the commissioner in 2011 when the Ateneo de Manila University was the host university.
- June 1 – 15: "Pagpupugay: 100 Taon ng Philippine Sports", an event organized by former PBL commissioner and GMA 7 sportscaster Chino Trinidad featuring some of the memorabilia of the 19 legends of Philippine sports exhibited in the Resorts World Manila.
- June 8: In a rare event, Vietnam's and the Philippines' Navies played football, tug of war and volleyball for the daylong sports and cultural festival held at the Southwest Cay Island in the West Philippine Sea.
- June 9
  - Filipino boxing champion and Sarangani congressman Manny Pacquiao was announced as the newest head coach of the Kia Motors team, one of the three newest expansion teams in the PBA. Pacquiao says he really focused in coaching than act as a playing coach.
  - Filipino Chess Grandmaster Wesley So announced he is migrated to the United States to seek further studies at the Webster University and to accredit for the U.S. Chess Federation.
- June 12: Filipino car racing champion Enzo Pastor was shot dead by an unknown suspect in Congressional Avenue, Quezon City. Racing enthusiasts mourned after the untimely death of Pastor.
- June 16: NLEX Road Warriors will discontinued their option as an expansion team of the PBA but they chooses to buy an existing franchise in the league, particularly in Air 21 Express.
- June 18: Former PBA player turned PBA television coverage analyst Jason Webb joined the San Mig Super Coffee Mixers as their assistant coach. Webb joined fellow TV analyst Richard del Rosario for the coaching duties.
- July 22: Basketball fans were dismayed inside the Smart Araneta Coliseum and thru social media after the last-minute cancellation of the "PLDT The Last Home Stand" exhibition match of the Gilas Pilipinas and the team composed of NBA players including 2014 NBA Finals MVP Kawhi Leonard, James Harden, Tyson Chandler, Brandon Jennings, Matt Barnes, Damian Lillard, DeMar DeRozan, Kyle Lowry, and Terrence Ross. Instead the game turned-out to a sessions of practices and drills with Gilas and the FIBR All Stars. PLDT chairman Manny V. Pangilinan expresses his deepest apologies to the fans and he promised to give refunds for the ticketholders of the 2-day event.
- July 25: Philip Ella Juico, former Philippine Sports Commission chairman (1996–1998), replaced Go Teng Kok as the chairman of the Philippine Amateur Track and Field Association (PATAFA).
- August 4: Stephan Schrock announced he was "resigning" from the Philippines national team, effectively announcing his international retirement to "pursue new challenges". He then revealed that he resigned as a protest against perceived internal problems in the Philippine Football Federation. He went on to say that he felt the veteran players of the national team were not being respected and won't play for the national team as long as Thomas Dooley is head coach.
- September 15: Teen actor Daniel Padilla was named as the #15th round draft pick for the AMA University for the 2014 PBA D-League Rookie Draft. Padilla said he will not suit up for AMA. Fil-Tongan Moala Tautuaa named as the first round pick of the draft.
- November 28 – 30: The 2014 Manila Mavericks season of the International Premier Tennis League (IPTL) was held in Mall of Asia Arena
  Pasay, Metropolitan Manila, Philippines. On November 30, the Mavericks earned their first victory in franchise history with a 27–19 home win over the Singapore Slammers.

== Multisports ==
=== Asian Games ===
- September 19 – October 4: The Philippines participated in the 2014 Asian Games in Incheon, South Korea from September 19 to October 4, 2014. For the first time since Bangkok in 1998, the country produced only one gold medal in the history of the country's participation in the games. Daniel Caluag, a Filipino Olympian in London 2012 Games, saved the Philippine team from the gold medal drought by winning first place in the BMX cycling. This is also the Philippine's first gold medal in cycling in the entire history of Asian Games.

=== Olympics ===
- February 7–23: The Philippines competed at the 2014 Winter Olympics in Sochi, Russia. The team consists of one athlete in figure skating. The country competed at the Winter Olympics for the first time in 22 years and fourth time overall.
- August 24: Luis Gabriel Moreno, grandson of German Moreno delivered the first medal for the Philippines in the 2014 Youth Olympic Games held in Nanjing, China. Moreno together with China's Li Jiaman won the gold in the archery mixed team event.

=== Palarong Pambansa ===
- May 4–10: 2014 Palarong Pambansa, the 57th edition of the multi-sports competition for the youth athletes was held at Laguna Sports Complex, Santa Cruz, Laguna; other sporting events were also held in Pila and Los Baños. Laguna Governor E.R. Ejercito, Manila Mayor Joseph Estrada, and prominent athletes led the opening ceremonies at the second day of the games. It was followed by the unveiling of the 26-foot-tall statue of Jose Rizal as an eskrima swordsman, the tallest monument of Rizal in the world. Zeanne Faith Cabrera of the Calabarzon delegation won the first gold medal of the competition after she ruled the girls javelin throw event, Approximately more than 11,000 participants and 1,000 trainers, coaches and sports officials from 17 regions joined the event. The competition ended with the National Capital Region team proclaimed as the over-all champion. The host region CALABARZON settled at second place.

=== Philippine National Games ===
- May 16–24: More than 7,000 athletes joined the 4th Philippine National Games, organized by the Philippine Sports Commission held at the Rizal Memorial Sports Complex, Manila. The games will be the preparation stage of the PH delegation for the 2014 Asian Games in Korea.

=== Cagayan Friendship Games ===
- June 22–30: The 2014 Alvaro A. Antonio Friendship Basketball & Volleyball Games was commenced at the People's Gym in Tuguegarao, Cagayan.

=== Asian Beach Games ===
- November 14–21: The 2014 Asian Beach Games will be held in Phuket, Thailand.

== Collegiate sports ==
- March 19: De La Salle University was hailed as the general champions of the UAAP Season 76 on its culmination ceremonies held at the Century Hotel Ballroom, Pasay. La Salle chess player Jan Jodilyn Fronda and FEU women's basketball team player Camille Sambile named as the Senior's Athletes of the Year of the season.
- June 28: The 90th season of the National Collegiate Athletic Association (Philippines) (NCAA) with the theme "Today's Heroes, Tomorrow's Legends. NCAA@90: We Make History" was commenced at the Mall of Asia Arena.
- July 12: The colorful season kick-off of the University Athletic Association of the Philippines (UAAP) Season 77 with the season theme "Unity in Excellence" was held at the Smart Araneta Coliseum. University of the East will be the host university for the whole season.

== Individual sports ==
=== Athletics ===
- June 1: Alaska World Milk Day Family Run was held at the Bonifacio Global City in Taguig.
- July 20: The second installment of "Botak at Kadla ni Pidol 2014" fun run was held at the Quirino Grandstand in Manila, in commemoration of the 2nd death anniversary of comedian Dolphy Quizon.
- July 21: Marestella Torres after delivering her first child, and under the tutelage of James Michael Lafferty returned to competition at the Hong Kong Open, winning Gold with a leap of 6.24 meters
- August 3: 2014 Cobra Ironman 70.3 Philippines will be held in Cebu.

=== Boxing ===
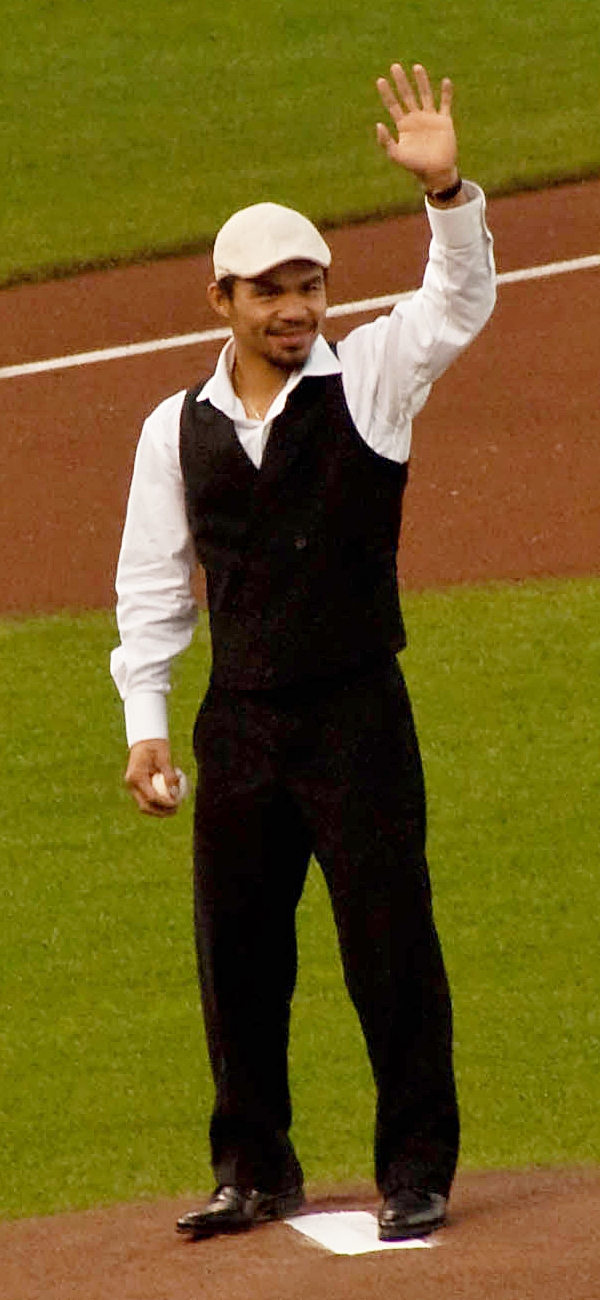
Manny Pacquiao is the only boxer who had held eight titles during his professional boxing career..

- March 2: Genesis Servania won the WBO Intercontinental Junior Featherweight Championship after defeating Alexander Muñoz of Venezuela at the end of the 12 round of the Pinoy Pride XXIV main event held at the Solaire Resort & Casino in Parañaque. Albert Pagara also won against Isack Junior of Indonesia in the undercard event; while Arthur Villanueva lost to Fernando Aguilar of Mexico, also in the undercard event.
- March 31: Filipino-Hawaiian boxer Brian Viloria won via unanimous decision on his comeback fight against Puerto Rican boxer Juan Herrera at the Texas Station Hotel and Casino, Las Vegas, Nevada.
- April 12: In a unanimous decision, Manny Pacquiao defeated Timothy Bradley in a boxing rematch held at the MGM Grand Garden Arena, Paradise, Nevada, United States. Being a championship match, Pacquiao also regained the WBO Welterweight title against Bradley.
- May 3: Despite being overweight by 5 pounds over the 108-pound limit in the official weigh-in & losing his IBF light flyweight belt, Johnriel Casimero won via technical knockout in the 1st round against Colombian Boxer Mauricio Fuentes in the main event of "Pinoy Knockout" held at the Waterfront Cebu City Hotel & Casino in Cebu City.
- May 11: Donnie Nietes defeats Mexican boxer Moises Fuentes in a 9th-round technical knockout on their rematch fight held at the Mall of Asia Arena, Pasay. Rey Bautista also won against Sergio Villanueva of Mexico in the undercard event; while Milan Melindo won against Martin Tecuapetla of Mexico, also in the undercard event.
- May 31: Nonito Donaire, Jr. defeated South African boxer Simpiwe Vetyeka and proclaimed as the new titleholder of IBF featherweight championship belt via 4th round fight stopping and unanimous technical decision in the main fight at the Cotai Arena in Macau, China SAR.
- June 22: Jason Pagara defeats Mexican boxer Mario Meraz in a 4th-round technical knockout in the main event held at the Waterfront Cebu City Hotel & Casino in Cebu City. Albert Pagara also won against Hugo Partida of Mexico in the 1st-round TKO while AJ Banal won via 2nd Round TKO against Indonesian Boxer Defry Palulu.
- July 19: Filipino-Hawaiian boxer Brian Viloria won via 5th-round knockout on his fight against Mexican boxer José Alfredo Zúñiga at the CotaiArena in Macau, China.
- October 19: Nonito Donaire made the first defense of his WBA (Super) Featherweight Championship against undefeated Jamaican, WBA (Regular) Featherweight Champion Nicholas Walters. The fight took place in Carson, California. Donaire lost to Walters by TKO in the 6th round.
- November 23: Manny Pacquiao is scheduled to fight against undefeated American boxer Christopher Algieri. The WBO Welterweight title fight will be held at the CotaiArena in Macau, China SAR. Pacquiao defeated Algieri in a unanimous decision to retain the World Boxing Organization (WBO) welterweight title in 12th round.

=== Chess ===
- May 21: Filipino chess grand master Wesley So hailed as the champion of the Capablanca Memorial Chess Open 2014 held in Havana, Cuba.

=== Cycling ===
- February 1–16: Ronda Pilipinas International 2014's first of all the sixteen stages was held at the Quezon City Memorial Circle. It ended with Reimon Lapaza declared as the winner. Peter Pouly ended as the runner-up, while Mark Galedo ranked third place.
- April 21–24: The 5th Le Tour de Filipinas bikeathon, organized by the Lina Group (Air 21 and UBE Media) was officially started at the Clark Field, Pampanga to Olongapo, Zambales, other following routes are Olongapo to Cabanatuan, Cabanatuan to Bayombong and Bayombong to Baguio. The 610.6 kilometer international cycling race is sanctioned by the Union Cycliste Internationale. It ended with Mark Galedo declared as the winner of the bikeathon. Galedo was the 2nd Filipino to win in the competition.
- May 16–18: Alaska Cycle Philippines was held at the Bonifacio Global City in Taguig.

=== Dragonboat ===
- June 14: The Cobra Philippine Dragon Boat Federation Team won two gold medals for the 100-meter mixed standard boat and 500-meter mixed standard boat categories in the recently concluded International Dragon Boat Federation (IDBF) World Cup in Fuzhou, China. PDBF Team also have one silver medal and one bronze medals.

=== Figure skating ===
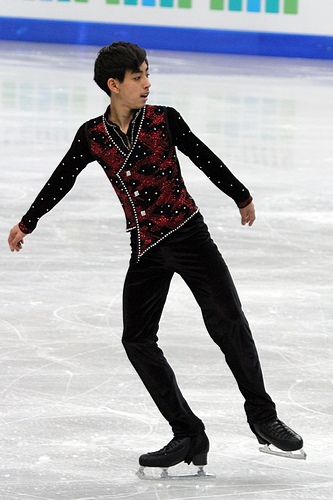
Michael Christian Martinez, the first Southeast Asian and Filipino figure skater to take part in the Winter Olympics.

- February 13–14: On February 13, Michael Christian Martinez competed in the figure skating short program event at the 2014 Winter Olympics in Sochi, Russia scoring 64.81 points making him advance to the free skate program. By February 14, Martinez scored 119.44 points in the free skating program. He placed 19th place overall with the score of 184.25 total points. Martinez was the lone Filipino athlete competing in the Olympics, and the first Southeast Asian to compete in the figure skating event.
- April 6: Olympian figure skater Michael Martinez won the Triglav Trophy International Figure Skating Tournament of the senior's division in Jesenice, Slovenia.

=== Golf ===
- April 11: With eight strokes and a total of 301 shots, Japanese young golfer Gen Nagai was proclaimed the winner of the 2014 Philippine Junior Amateur Golf Championship held in Trece Martires, Cavite.
- May 15–18: The 2014 Philippine Open, organized by the MVP Sports Foundation was held at the Wack-Wack Golf & Country Club. Several Asian Tour champions including former champion Angelo Que joined the tournament. Australian guest golfer and one-time Asian Tour champion Marcus Both, won this year's tournament.

=== Mixed martial arts ===
- March 1: Team Lakay Mark Eddiva won against Featherweight Jumabieke Tuerxun via unanimous decision in the Preliminary Card of The Ultimate Fighter China Finale in Macau, China.
- May 2: One Fighting Championship 15: Rise of Heroes was held at the SM Mall of Asia Arena. Filipino-American boxer Ana Julaton won against Aya Saber via 2nd-round technical knockout on her first fight inside the cage of ONE FC. Team Lakay's Edward Folayang also won the co-main event against Kotetsu Boku via unanimous decision. In the main event, Bibiano Fernandes scores a unanimous decision winning on the main fight of ONE FC 15 against Masakatsu Ueda.
- May 31:
  - Filipino-American MMA artist Mark Muñoz suffered a loss to light heavyweight champion Gegard Mousasi due to rear naked choke in the 1st round of their main event of UFC Fight Night 41 in Berlin, Germany.
  - MMA artist Mark Eddiva suffered a loss to Featherweight Kevin Souza due to Technical Knockout in the 2nd round of the Preliminary Card of The Ultimate Fighter Brazil Finale in São Paulo, Brazil.
- June 12: Mark Muñoz's new four-fight contract with UFC was announced.

=== Surfing ===
- February 21–22: The first Asian Surfing Championship was held at the Urbiztondo beach in San Juan, La Union.

== Team sports ==
=== Basketball ===
- February 26:
  - The NLEX Road Warriors achieved their 5th title of the PBA D-League after their winning against Big Chill Super Chargers in Game 2 of the 2014 PBA D-League Aspirants Cup Finals, 88–70.
  - The San Mig Super Coffee Mixers were crowned as the champions of the 2013–14 PBA Philippine Cup after beating Rain or Shine Elasto Painters in the Game 6 of the finals series, 93–87. Mark Barroca was crowned as the Finals MVP.
- March 5: The opening of the 2014 PBA Commissioner's Cup, the second conference of the 2013-14 PBA season. The tournament allowed teams to hire foreign players or imports with a height limit of 6'11 for the bottom two of the last conference, and a limit of 6'9 for other teams.
- March 24–29: A charity 5-day non-stop basketball marathon held in the Meralco Gym in Pasig for the victims of Typhoon Yolanda was recognized by the Guinness Book of World Records as the Longest Basketball Game beaten the record of the Missouri Athletic Club last 2012. Team Bounce Back won the game against Team Walang Iwanan, 16,783–16,732.
- April 4–6: The 2014 PBA All-Star Weekend was held at the Mall of Asia Arena in Pasay. Rey Guevara of the Meralco Bolts and Justin Melton of the San Mig Super Coffee Mixers tied as champions of the Slam-Dunk contest. Gilas Pilipinas won their exhibition game against the PBA All-Star Selection, 101–93. Gary David, currently playing for the Meralco Bolts was the game's Most Valuable Player.
- May 16: The San Mig Super Coffee Mixers beat the Talk N' Text Tropang Texters as the team proclaimed as champions of the 2014 PBA Commissioner's Cup and gave their 3rd straight titles on the game 4 the Finals series held at the PhilSports Arena, 100–91. James Yap named as the Finals MVP with an average of 11.5 points in the whole series.
- May 18: The 2014 PLDT Home Telpad PBA Governor's Cup, will be the third and last conference of the 2013-14 PBA season. The conference will start on May 18 and is expected to end in the last week of June 2014 to give way for the preparations of the Gilas Pilipinas for the 2014 FIBA World Cup.
- June 2: The NLEX Road Warriors achieved their 6th title of the PBA D-League after their winning against Blackwater Sports in Game 2 of the 2014 PBA D-League Foundation Cup Finals, 81–78.
- June 21: Minnesota Timberwolves forward Kevin Love was visited the country for the 2014 Master GameFace Challenge. Team Chris, headed by Chris Tiu dominated the three-point-shootout challenge and the all star game against Team Marc of Marc Pingris. The event was held at the Smart Araneta Coliseum and organized by a facial cleanser brand. Team Chris won the game, 135–110, Greg Slaughter named as the MVP.
- July 4–6: Toronto Raptors player DeMar DeRozan was visited the Philippines for the NBA 3X event held at SM Mall of Asia Music Hall.
- July 8: The AFP Cavaliers bagged the championship title of Season 2 of UNTV Cup after they won against PNP Responders in the Game 3 of the Finals series at Smart Araneta Coliseum, Quezon City, 74–73. AFP won the P1.5 million cash prize for their chosen beneficiary.
- July 9: The San Mig Super Coffee Mixers were crowned as the Grand Slam champions of the 2014 PBA Governors' Cup after beating Rain or Shine Elasto Painters in the Game 5 of the finals series, 92–89. James Yap was crowned as the Finals MVP.
- July 11–19 The 2014 FIBA Asia Cup will be held in various locations in Wuhan, China. Gilas Pilipinas national basketball team, grouped under Group B.
- July 18: Gilas Pilipinas lost their semi-finals match against the national basketball team, Iran in the 2014 FIBA Asia Cup, 76–55.
- July 19: Gilas Pilipinas thru one of their players, Paul Dalistan, ended their campaign at the 2014 FIBA Asia Cup after a sudden won against to China, 80–79 in their Third place match.
- July 19–20: The FIBA 3x3 World Tour was hosted by manila will be held at the SM Megamall Fashion Hall in Mandaluyong.
- August 8–16: The 2014 FIBA Under-17 World Championship will be held in various locations in United Arab Emirates.
- August 24: The 2014 PBA Rookie Draft was held at the Robinson's Place Manila. The GlobalPort Batang Pier picked Stanley Pringle as the #1 overall draft pick. Manny Pacquiao is the first round pick for Kia Sorento.
- September 4: Gilas Pilipinas claims their first win in the FIBA World Cup in four decades against Senegal in overtime, 81–79. Filipino fans and Malacanang Palace congratulates Gilas after their successful end of their campaign.
- September 22: EAC Generals and Mapua Cardinals are involved in a bench-clearing brawl in the final seconds of their game of the NCAA eliminations held at the San Juan Arena. The NCAA management formally suspends EAC and MIT players including John Tayongtong (5-game suspension) and referees after the incident
- October 15: The NU Bulldogs were crowned as the season 77 Basketball champions of the UAAP Season 77 basketball tournaments after beating FEU Tamaraws in the Game 3 of the finals series, 75–59. and also breaking its 60-year title drought. Alfred Aroga was crowned as the Finals MVP.
- October 19: The opening ceremonies and opening games of the 2014–15 PBA Philippine Cup was held at the Philippine Arena, Bocaue, Bulacan. 12 tournament teams will compete in this year's conference.
- November 5: Allen Iverson, together with Eddy Curry and the Ballhog Squad will play against PBA legends, UAAP & NCAA players in "All In" charity basketball game to be held at the Mall of Asia Arena.
- November 8: The inaugural season of the Pinay Ballers League (PIBALeague), a new professional basketball league for women was commenced thru an opening ceremonies at the Rizal Memorial Stadium.

=== Football ===
- January 11: The fifth season of the United Football League kicked off with 21 participating teams from two divisions.
- April 7: The Philippine girl's Street Child World Cup team placed second in the said sporting event. The team was defeated by Brazil in the finals.
- April 27: The Philippine Azkals faced the Malaysian Tigers in a FIFA-sanction international friendly game in Cebu City Sports Complex. The match was for the preparations of the national football team for the 2014 AFC Challenge Cup. The match ended in a scoreless draw.
- May 20–31: The 2014 AFC Challenge Cup was held in Maldives. Philippine Azkals national football team was grouped under Group B.
- May 28: Azkals won their semi-finals match against the national football team of host country, Maldives in the 2014 AFC Challenge Cup, 3–2. Finals first-timers Azkals will face Palestine in the finals match for the spot of the 2015 AFC Asian Cup in Australia on May 30.
- May 31: Azkals ended their campaign at the 2014 AFC Challenge Cup after a sudden loss to Palestine, 1–0 in their finals match.
- June 8: The inaugural staging of the PFF's Women's Cup, organized by the Philippine Football Federation to be held at The Turf, Bonifacio Global City, Taguig. Similar to the UFL, the PFF's Women's Cup will several football clubs featuring women's football players from the UAAP and the Malditas Philippine national football team.
- June 15: The Philippine women's U14 team achieved second place at the AFC U14 Girls Championship for Southeast Asia only losing to Thailand in the finals with the score 1–2. The team also won the Fair Play Award and midfielder Joyce Demacio was declared most valuable player of the tournament.
- November 22 – December 20: 2014 AFF Suzuki Cup was held in Singapore and Vietnam. The Azkals reached its third consecutive semi-finals but failed its bid to reach the final.

=== Motorsports ===
- April 5–6: The Asian V8 Championship was held in Clark International Speedway.
- May 24: The 2014 Toyota Vios Cup was held in Clark International Speedway, Pampanga. 30 race car drivers including celebrities Rhian Ramos, Phoemela Baranda, Sam YG, Fabio Ide, Solar Sports Desk's Jinno Rufino and Radyo Inquirer anchor Ira Panganiban competed in the race. Jason Choachoy and Allan Uy emerged as the champion and the first place, respectably.
- June 7–8: The Second Leg of the Asian V8 Championship was held in Rosario Racing Circuit in Batangas.

=== Polo ===
- March 4: Inaugural open of the Philippine Polo Open 2014 at the Globalport Field in Calatagan, Batangas. Six teams are competing in the said sporting event.

=== Volleyball ===
- March 15: The Ateneo de Manila University's (ADMU) Ateneo Lady Eagles won their first championship title in the season 76 of the UAAP women's volleyball tournament against De La Salle University's (DLSU) De La Salle Lady Spikers in three straight sets: 25–23, 26–24, and 25–21. Alyssa Valdez, now on her third UAAP year in ADMU, was named as the season's MVP, best scorer, best server, and the finals' MVP of the season.
- April 2: The Philippine Super Liga 1st player draft was held at the NBA Cafe, SM Aura Premier, Taguig. Former NU Lady Bulldogs star spiker Dindin Santiago was the 1st overall pick of the draft. Santiago will be played for Petron. Graduating La Salle Lady Spikers team captain Abigail Maraño picked by AirAsia Zest, the newest franchise of the league as the 2nd overall pick. AirAsia Zest will be headed by 16-year champion coach of La Salle, Ramil de Jesus.
- April 8: The 8-day 2014 Asian Men's Club Volleyball Championship in Manila officially started at the SM Mall of Asia Arena.
- April 16: Vatin Varamin-Iran men's volleyball team defended their championship title in the 2014 Asian Men's Club Volleyball Championship after they beaten Al-Rayyan Qatar in the championship match, 19–25, 25–17, 26–24, 25–16. PLDT Home FIBR Power Pinoys ended in the 7th place.
- May 16: The opening ceremonies and opening games of the 2014 Philippine Super Liga All-Filipino Conference was held at the Cuneta Astrodome, Pasay. 7 women's tournament teams and 5 men's tournament team will compete in this year's conference.
- May 18: NU Lady Bulldogs and Petron Blaze Spikers player Dindin Santiago won her second MVP award in the recently concluded Awards ceremony of the Shakey's V-League's Season 11 First Conference.
- May 25: The FEU Lady Tamaraws won their first-ever title of the Shakey's V-League after they beaten the NU Lady Bulldogs on a 3-straight set finals match of Season 11 First Conference held at the San Juan Arena, 25–21, 25–23, 25–18. Former FEU team captain and guest player Rachel Anne Daquis, who will settle to play for Generika-Army Lady Troopers, together with co-guest player Jovelyn Gonzaga on the Philippine Super Liga named as the Finals MVP.
- July 26: The Generika-Army Lady Troopers won their third straight title of the Philippine Super Liga after they beaten the RC Cola Air Force Raiders on a 3-straight set finals match of The 2014 PSL All-Filipino Conference held at Cuneta Astrodome, 25–22, 25–19, 25–16. Veteran Tina Salak named as the MVP of the conference. PLDT Home TVolution-Air Force won their second straight championship in the Men's Division.
- September 8–9: 70 volleybelles attended the 2-day National Women's Volleyball tryout for the 2015 Southeast Asian Games at the Ninoy Aquino Stadium.

==== Beach Volleyball ====
- May 3: De La Salle University spikers Kim Fajardo and Ara Galang emerged as the newest titleholders of the 17th Nestea Beach Volleyball Tournament held at Boracay, Aklan after beating the Adamson University team (Shiela Pineda and Amanda Villanueva), 15–21, 21–14, 17–15.

== Deaths ==
- February 23: Ely Capacio (born 1954), 58, former Philippine Basketball Association (PBA) player and coach, ruptured aneurysm.
- March 31: Bryan Gahol (born 1977), 36, former PBA player, vehicular accident.
- April 5: Rodolfo Lordan Jr. (born circa 1984–1985), 29, billiards player, sudden unexpected death syndrome.
- April 14: Jesus T. Tanchanco Sr., (born circa 1925–1926), 83, former National Food Authority (NFA) administrator and former UE Red Warriors team manager, cardiac arrest.
- May 13: Anthony Villanueva, (born 1945), 69, boxer and first Olympic silver medalist for the Philippines, heart failure.
- June 12: Ferdinand "Enzo" Pastor, Jr., (born circa 1981–1982), 32, Asian V8 race champion, shot dead.
- August 29: Kurt Bachmann, (born 1936), 78, former basketball player who competed in the 1960 Summer Olympics.
- November 4: Nikki Tabafunda, (born circa 1991–1992), 23, Lyceum Pirates setter, tonsilitis.
- December 3: Isabelo "Bong" Hilario, Filipino car racer & 2013 Honda Master Trans Sports Competition Champion, gunshot wound.
