= Jason Pagara =

Filipino boxer (born 1992)

Personal information
- Nickname: "El Niño"
- Nationality: Filipino
- Born: Jason Herogalem Pagara; July 17, 1992 (age 34) Maasin, Southern Leyte, Philippines
- Height: 5 ft 8 in (1.73 m)
- Weight: Welterweight; Light Welterweight; Lightweight

Boxing career
- Stance: Orthodox

Boxing record
- Total fights: 45
- Wins: 41
- Win by KO: 26
- Losses: 3
- Draws: 1

Jason Pagara is a Filipino professional boxer.

He was a Junior Welterweight WBO international champion in 2011.

== Early life ==
Pagara was born in Maasin, Southern Leyte, where he started boxing at the age of 8, as he played with neighborhood friends. He watched his father Reynaldo, who was also a boxer. The wins of Filipino fighters Manny Pacquiao, Rey Bautista and AJ Banal also inspired him.

His younger brother Albert Pagara is also a boxer.

== Professional career ==
Pagara made his professional debut on September 29, 2006, at the age of 14, defeating Tata Tadena at Jagna, Bohol, Philippines. On July 25, 2009, Pagara defeated Simson Butar-Butar by unanimous decision in a 10-round bout at the Dao Public Terminal in Tagbilaran City, Bohol, Philippines. The judges' scorecards were 100–89, 99-89 and 96-92 all for Pagara.

On June 12, 2011, he beat Juan Carlos Gallego via TKO on round 4.

On September 10, 2011, he was defeated by Rosbel Montoya via 10 round unanimous decision. He later beat Montoya in the sixth round of the Pinoy Pride XV held at the Waterfront-Cebu City Hotel and Casino.

On October 20, 2012, he knocked out Barbados Miguel Antoine via TKO on the 1st round.

Pagara defended his WBO International light welterweight title against Aaron Herrera on May 25, 2013, at the Waterfront Cebu City Hotel, posting a winning score from all three judges after 12 rounds.

He successfully defended his WBO International light welterweight belt against Mario Meraz, knocking down the latter in the fourth round at the Cebu City Waterfront Hotel & Casino in Cebu City on June 21, 2014.

In his first international bout held at Dubai World Trade Centre in Dubai, Pagara won against Mexico's Ramiro Alcaraz via technical unanimous decision on August 7, 2015. The 23-year-old boxer suffered wounded left eye from an accidental head bout in the opening salvo but managed to continue the fight until the 8th round. Doctor advised to stop the fight considering too much blood flowing from Pagara's wound. He won on all judges' scorecards over Alcaraz.

October 17, 2015 First time in United States WBO No. 2 lightweight contender Jason 'El Nino' Pagara made short work of his opponent Santos Benavides of Nicaragua putting him three times to the canvas in the 2nd round for a TKO victory as Referee Raul Caiz Sr waived the contest after the 3rd knockdown in the 2nd bout of Pinoy Pride 33 in Carson, California.

Pagara now improves to 37-2-0 with 23 knockouts while Benavides dropped to 25-8-2 with 19 stoppages.

== Professional boxing record ==
41 Wins (25 Knockouts), 3 Defeat (1 Knockout), 1 Draw, 0 No Contests
Res.	Record	Opponent	Type	Rd., Time	Date	Location	Notes
Win	41-3-1	(Indonesia) Wellem Reyk	TKO	3(10)	2018-06-09	(Philippines) Maasin City Gym, Maasin City	
Loss	40-3-1	(Japan) Hiroki Okada	TKO	6(12)	2017-12-19	(Japan) Korakuen Hall, Tokyo	For the vacant WBO Asia-Pacific Junior Welterweight title
Draw	40-2-1	(Kenya) James Onyango	SD	10	2017-09-16	(Philippines) Waterfront Hotel and Casino, Cebu City	
Win	40-2-0	(Nicaragua) José Alfaro	KO	1(12), 2:15	2016-11-26	(Philippines) Cebu Coliseum, Cebu City	
Win	39-2-0	(United States) Abraham Alvarez	KO	3(10), 0:50	2016-07-09	(United States) San Mateo Events Cente, California	
Win	38-2-0	(Mexico) Miguel Zamudio	UD	10	2016-04-23	(Philippines) Cebu City Sports Complex, Cebu City	
Win	37-2-0	(Nicaragua) Santos Benavides	KO	2(10), 2:53	2015-10-17	(United States) StubHub Center, Carson, California	
Win	36-2-0	(Mexico) Ramiro Alcaraz	TD	8(10)	2015-08-07	(United Arab Emirates) World Trade Centre, Sheikh Zayed Road, Dubai	
Win	35-2-0	(Mexico) César Chávez	TKO	2(12), 1:56	2015-02-07	University of Southeastern Philippines Gym, Obrero, Davao City	Retained WBO International Junior Welterweight title
Win	34-2-0	(Mexico) Mario Meraz	TKO	4(12), 2:59	2014-06-21	(Philippines) Waterfront Cebu City Hotel & Casino, Lahug, Cebu City	Retained WBO International Junior Welterweight title
Win	33-2-0	(Indonesia) Rusmin Kie Raha	KO	7(10),1:52	2014-04-11	(Philippines) Maasin City Gym, Maasin City	Retained WBO International Junior Welterweight title
Win	32-2-0	(Dominican Republic) Vladimir Baez	UD	10	2014-06-07	(Philippines) Araneta Coliseum Cubao, Quezon City	Retained WBO International Junior Welterweight title
Win	31-2-0	(Mexico) Aaron Herrera	UD	12	2013-05-25	(Philippines) Waterfront Cebu City Hotel & Casino, Lahug, Cebu City	Retained WBO International Junior Welterweight title
Win	30-2-0	(Barbados) Miguel Antoine	KO	1(12), 2:48	2012-10-20	(Philippines) SM Mall of Asia Arena, Pasay	Retained WBO International Junior Welterweight title
Win	29-2-0	(Mexico) Rosbel Montoya	TKO	6(12), 1:41	2012-08-18	(Philippines) Waterfront Cebu City Hotel & Casino, Lahug, Cebu City	Won vacant WBO International Light Welterweight title
Win	28-2-0	(Indonesia) Frans Yarangga	TKO	2(8), 2:41	2012-03-03	(Philippines) Carlos P. Garcia Sports Complex, Tagbilaran City	
Loss	27-2-0	(Mexico) Rosbel Montoya	UD	10	2011-09-10	(Philippines) Waterfront Cebu City Hotel & Casino, Lahug, Cebu City	Lost WBO Asia Pacific Youth Light Welterweight belt.
Win	27-1-0	(Mexico) Juan Carlos Gallegos	KO	4(10), 2:59	2011-06-11	(Philippines) Waterfront Cebu City Hotel & Casino, Lahug, Cebu City	
Win	26-1-0	(Tanzania) Deo Njiku	KO	2(10), 1:58	2011-04-09	(Philippines) University of St. La Salle Coliseum, Bacolod	Won vacant WBO Asia Pacific Youth Light Welterweight title.
Win	25-1-0	(Indonesia) Billy Sumba	KO	1(10), 2:53	2011-01-29	(Philippines) Waterfront Cebu City Hotel & Casino, Lahug, Cebu City	
Win	24-1-0	(Thailand) Sapapetch Sor Sakaorat	TKO	2 (10), 2:24	2010-10-30	(Philippines) Waterfront Cebu City Hotel & Casino, Lahug, Cebu City	
Win	23-1-0	(South Korea) Young-Bin Kim	TKO	2 (10), 2:18	2010-07-17	(Philippines) Carlos P. Garcia Sports Complex, Tagbilaran City	
Win	22-1-0	(Philippines) Romeo Jakosalem	TKO	2 (10), 2:57	2010-05-23	(Philippines) Waterfront Cebu City Hotel & Casino, Lahug, Cebu City	
Win	21-1-0	(Indonesia) Eddy Comaro	MD	10	2010-01-23	(Philippines) Cuneta Astrodome, Pasay	
Win	20-1-0	(Thailand) Decha Kokietgym	UD	10	2009-10-16	(Philippines) Waterfront Cebu City Hotel & Casino, Lahug, Cebu City	Won WBO Asia Pacific Youth lightweight title
Win	19-1-0	(Indonesia) Simson Butar Butar	UD	10	2009-07-25	(Philippines) Island City Mall Cark Park, Tagbilaran City	
Win	18-1-0	(Indonesia) Hero Yauw Katili	KO	3(10), 2:23	2009-05-16	(Philippines) Cebu Coliseum, Cebu City	
Win	17-1-0	(Philippines) JR Sollano	SD	12	2009-02-21	(Philippines) Plaza Lapasan, Lapasan, Cagayan de Oro	Retain Phil. Games & Amusement Board (GAB) lightweight title
Win	16-1-0	(Philippines) Arnel Porras	UD	12	2008-10-30	(Philippines) Limketkai Mall Atrium, Cagayan de Oro	Won vacant Phil. Games & Amusement Board (GAB) lightweight title
Win	15-1-0	(Thailand) Kondej Sithtrajtrakan	TKO	4 (8), 2:20	2008-08-30	(Philippines) Waterfront Cebu City Hotel & Casino, Lahug, Cebu City	
Win	14-1-0	(Indonesia) Heri Andriyanto	RTD	2 (10), 3:30	2008-05-31	(Philippines) Waterfront Cebu City Hotel & Casino, Lahug, Cebu City	Won vacant WBO Asia Pacific Youth lightweight title
Win	13-1-0	(Philippines) William George	TKO	3 (8), 1:46	2008-03-07	(Philippines) Mandaue City Sports and Cultural Complex, Mandaue City	
Loss	12-1-0	(Philippines) Rey Anton Olarte	UD	6	2007-12-02	(Philippines) Araneta Coliseum Cubao, Quezon City	
Win	12-0-0	(Philippines) Melvin Ayudtud	KO	4 (10), 0:58	2007-10-18	(Philippines) Baungon Public Plaza, Baungon	
Win	11-0-0	(Philippines) Glen Masicampo	TKO	7 (8), 2:40	2007-10-06	(Philippines) DMPC Gym, Cagayan de Oro	
Win	10-0-0	(Philippines) Rey Anton Olarte	UD	10	2007-08-26	(Philippines) City Amphitheater, Cagayan de Oro	Won Philippine Boxing Federation (PBF) lightweight title.
Win	9-0-0	(Philippines) Pedro Malco	UD	10	2007-08-12	(Philippines) Maranding, Lala	
Win	8-0-0	(Philippines) Dondon Lapuz	UD	10	2007-07-12	(Philippines) Carmen, Cagayan de Oro	
Win	7-0-0	(Philippines) Warlito Bartiquel	TKO	6 (10), 1:37	2007-05-22	(Philippines) Talibon Municipal Gym, Talibon	
Win	6-0-0	(Philippines) Jomar Labiogo	TKO	8 (8)	2007-03-23	(Philippines) Gusa Sports Complex, Gusa, Cagayan de Oro	
Win	5-0-0	(Philippines) Jomar Labiogo	SD	8	2007-02-11	(Philippines) Rena Sports Complex, Macaas, Catmon	
Win	4-0-0	(Philippines) Roy Llanasa	UD	4 (6), 1:19	2006-12-22	(Philippines) Oroquieta City Gymnasium, Oroquieta City	
Win	3-0-0	(Philippines) Phil Angcamor	TKO	2(6)	2006-12-15	(Philippines) Gusa Sports Complex, Gusa, Cagayan de Oro	
Win	2-0-0	(Philippines) Richard Cablay	TKO	1(6)	2006-10-19	(Philippines) Baungon Public Plaza, Baungon	
Win	1-0-0	(Philippines) Tata Tadena	UD	4 (4)	2006-09-29	(Philippines) Jagna Public Market Park, Looc, Jagna	

== See also ==
- List of Filipino boxing world champions
- List of WBO world champions
- List of light-welterweight boxing champions
