= Aaron Herrera =

Aaron Herrera may refer to:

- Aaron Herrera (footballer) (born 1997), Guatemalan footballer
- Aaron Herrera (boxer) (born 1990), Mexican boxer
