= Rafael Concepción =

Panamanian boxer

Personal information
- Nickname: El Torito
- Nationality: (Panama) Panamanian
- Born: Rafael Concepción; 24 June 1982 (age 44) Panama City, Panama
- Height: 5 ft 4 in (163 cm)
- Weight: Bantamweight

Boxing career
- Stance: Orthodox

Boxing record
- Total fights: 27
- Wins: 18
- Win by KO: 8
- Losses: 8
- Draws: 1

Rafael Concepción (born 24 June 1982) is a boxer from the Republic of Panama, nicknamed "El Torito". He has a record of 13 wins, 4 losses and 1 draw.

== Notable bouts ==
He fought A. J. "Bazooka" Banal of the Philippines for the WBA interim Super Flyweight Title on July 26, 2008, in which he came out the victor. Though trailing in points, Concepcion sent Banal to the canvass in the 10th round. Due to exhaustion, his opponent refuse to rise back and continue.

On his first defense of the crown, Concepcion took on former world title holder Jorge Arce on September 15 that same year. After a vicious exchange of punches, he conceded the match and the title at the end of the 9th round.

He faced Nonito Donaire on August 15, 2009 in the Hard Rock Hotel in Las Vegas, Nevada to regain the same title he lost which has become vacant. On the weigh-in, however, Concepcion was more than 4 pounds overweight and could not go lower on time. Thus the title became only available for Donaire who successfully made the weight limit. Concepcion lost the bout via unanimous decision. From there, Concepcion moved to bantamweight.

== Professional boxing record ==
27 fights	18 wins	8 losses
By knockout	8	5
By decision	10	3
Draws	1	

No.	Result	Record	Opponent	Type	Round, time	Date	Location	Notes
27	Loss	18–8–1	Roberto Vásquez	TKO	4 (10)	8 Aug 2015	Radisson Victoria Plaza, Montevideo, Uruguay	For vacant WBA Fedebol super bantamweight title
26	Loss	18–7–1	Genesis Servania	TKO	2 (12), 2:04	26 Oct 2013	Waterfront Cebu City Hotel & Casino, Barangay Lahug, Cebu City, Philippines	For vacant WBO Inter-Continental super bantamweight title
25	Win	18–6–1	Germán Lara	UD	8	3 Aug 2013	Roberto Durán Arena, Panama City, Panama	
24	Win	17–6–1	Alejandro Corrales	UD	6	20 Apr 2013	Roberto Durán Arena, Panama City, Panama	
23	Loss	16–6–1	Liborio Solís	UD	11	22 Oct 2011	Roberto Durán Arena, Panama City, Panama	For WBA Fedelatin bantamweight title
22	Win	16–5–1	Luis Felipe Cuadrado	UD	8	27 May 2011	Hotel RIU, Panama City, Panama	
21	Win	15–5–1	Alex Olea	UD	8	14 Jan 2011	Hotel RIU, Panama City, Panama	
20	Loss	14–5–1	Fernando Montiel	KO	3 (12), 1:07	17 Jul 2010	Palenque de la Feria, Tuxtla Gutiérrez, Mexico	For WBC and WBO bantamweight titles
19	Win	14–4–1	Sergio Gómez	UD	10	18 Mar 2010	Roberto Durán Arena, Panama City, Panama	
18	Loss	13–4–1	Nonito Donaire	UD	12	15 Aug 2009	The Joint, Paradise, Nevada, U.S.	WBA interim super flyweight title only at stake for Donaire as Concepción misses weight
17	Win	13–3–1	Kermin Guardia	UD	8	3 Feb 2009	The Masonic Temple, Brooklyn, New York, U.S.	
16	Win	12–3–1	Emerson Nisperusa	TKO	2 (8), 1:20	28 Nov 2008	Centro de Convenciones Atlapa, Panama City, Panama	
15	Loss	11–3–1	Jorge Arce	RTD	9 (12), 3:00	15 Sep 2008	Arena México, Mexico City, Mexico	Lost WBA interim super flyweight title
14	Win	11–2–1	A. J. Banal	KO	10 (12), 2:35	26 Jul 2008	Cebu Coliseum, Cebu City, Philippines	Won vacant WBA interim super flyweight title
13	Win	10–2–1	Jean Piero Pérez	TKO	3 (10), 0:48	27 Mar 2008	Centro de Convenciones Atlapa, Panama City, Panama	
12	Win	9–2–1	Alberto Mitre	TKO	7 (10), 1:32	14 Jul 2007	Roberto Durán Arena, Panama City, Panama	
11	Win	8–2–1	Jean Piero Pérez	SD	10	24 Mar 2007	Centro de Convenciones Figali, Panama City, Panama	WBA Fedelatin flyweight title only at stake for Pérez as Concepión misses weight
10	Win	7–2–1	Ricardo Molina	KO	4 (12), 3:00	20 May 2006	Centro de Convenciones Atlapa, Panama City, Panama	Won vacant WBC FECARBOX super flyweight title
9	Win	6–2–1	Javier Córdoba	UD	6	15 Oct 2005	Centro de Convenciones Figali, Panama City, Panama	
8	Win	5–2–1	Ezequiel Asprilla	TKO	2 (6), 2:59	29 Jul 2005	Centro de Convenciones Figali, Panama City, Panama	
7	Win	4–2–1	Ezequiel Asprilla	UD	6	3 Jun 2005	Roberto Durán Arena, Panama City, Panama	
6	Loss	3–2–1	Ricardo Molina	SD	6	13 Nov 2004	Jardín Nuevas Glorias Soberanas, Juan Díaz, Panama	
5	Win	3–1–1	Eduardo González	UD	4	19 Jun 2004	Arena Panama Al Brown, Colón, Panama	
4	Win	2–1–1	Alexander Murillo	TKO	3 (4)	19 Jul 2003	Salón Magnum Eventus, Bella Vista, Panama	
3	Draw	1–1–1	Luis Quiel	TD	3 (4)	28 Mar 2003	Salón Magnum Eventus, Bella Vista, Panama	
2	Loss	1–1	Alexander Murillo	TKO	2 (4)	31 Jan 2003	Arena Panama Al Brown, Colón, Panama	
1	Win	1–0	Carlos Alberto Murillo	TKO	2 (4), 1:51	30 Aug 2002	Jardín La Macaraquena, 24 de Diciembre, Panama	

Vacant Title last held by Leo Gamez	WBA Super Flyweight Champion; Interim Title; July 26, 2008 – September 15, 2008	Succeeded by Jorge Arce
