= Asian V8 Championship Series =

Motorsports competition

- Category: Stock Cars
- Country: Asia-Pacific
- Inaugural season: 2014
- Official website: www.asianv8championship.com

The Asian V8 Championship Series (AV8C) was a motorsports competition for stock car race drivers from the Asia-Pacific. The only edition of the racing series took place in 2014, over two events at the Clark International Speedway in Pampanga and the Batangas Racing Circuit in Batangas, both in the Philippines. The tournament was organized by the Philippine Formula Autosports Foundation and was intended to set the Philippines as a hub for NASCAR racing in Asia. The overall winner of the tournament will compete in the NASCAR Whelen Series and in the K&N Pro NASCAR Series.

== Participants ==
Rider
(Australia) Josh Burdon
(Japan) Kunihiro Iwatsuki
(Italy) Stefano Marrini
(Macau) Joe Merszei
(United States) Don Pastor (Note: Don Pastor represented Team USA for this tournament. He has also represented the Philippines in other tournaments)
(Philippines) Enzo Pastor (Note: On June 12, Enzo Pastor was shot dead by motorcycle-riding gunmen in Quezon City on the way to Clark, Pampanga for the final leg of the tournament.)

== Schedule ==
No.	Track	Date
1	Clark International Speedway, Mabalacat, Pampanga	April 5
2	Clark International Speedway, Mabalacat, Pampanga	April 6
3	Batangas Racing Circuit, Rosario, Batangas	June 7
4	Batangas Racing Circuit, Rosario, Batangas	June 8

== Race winners ==
No.	Race	Winning driver
1	Clark	(Philippines) Enzo Pastor
2	Clark	(Australia) Josh Burdon
3	Batangas	(Australia) Josh Burdon
4	Batangas	(Philippines) Enzo Pastor
