= José Manuel Osório =

Mexican boxer (born 1987)

Personal information
- Nickname: Pocholo
- Born: 25 September 1987 (age 39) Guadalajara, Jalisco, Mexico
- Height: 1.77 m (5 ft 10 in)
- Weight: Super featherweight

Boxing career
- Reach: 183 cm (72 in)
- Stance: Orthodox

Boxing record
- Total fights: 29
- Wins: 22
- Win by KO: 15
- Losses: 2
- Draws: 5
- No contests: 0

José Manuel Osório (born 27 September 1987) is a Mexican professional boxer. He is promoted by Saúl Álvarez' company Canelo Promotions.

== Professional career ==
On 1 October 2010 García beat the undefeated Victor Guzman, the bout was held at the Arena Jalisco in Guadalajara.

His next fight will be against Colombian veteran Alexander Monterrosa on the undercard of Canelo Álvarez vs. Ryan Rhodes.
