= Albert Pagara =

Filipino boxer (born 1994)

Personal information
- Nicknames: Prince; Prince Albert
- Nationality: Filipino
- Born: Albert Herogalem Pagara; 18 February 1994 (age 32) Maasin, Southern Leyte, Philippines
- Height: 5 ft 6 in (1.68 m)
- Weight: Super bantamweight Super flyweight

Boxing career
- Reach: 68 in (173 cm)
- Stance: Orthodox

Boxing record
- Total fights: 40
- Wins: 37
- Win by KO: 26
- Losses: 3
- Draws: 0

Albert Pagara (born February 18, 1994) is a Filipino professional boxer. He currently competes in the super bantamweight division and was a WBO and IBF Inter-Continental champion.

Professional boxer Jason Pagara is his older brother.

== Early life ==
Albert Pagara was born in Maasin, Southern Leyte to Reynaldo Pagara and Sabrian Herugalem. His older brother, Jason, is also a professional boxer.

Pagara started amateur boxing under the Maasin Sports Council. Along with his brother, he moved to Cagayan de Oro to train further. There, the brothers studied at Misamis Oriental General Comprehensive High School. During his teens, he won a total of 10 gold medals in Palarong Pambansa.

== Professional boxing career ==
Pagara made his professional debut on August 18, 2011, at the age of 17, defeating fellow debutant Sandy Cajil via TKO in the second round at Cebu IT Park, Cebu City, Philippines.

On October 8, 2011, he defeated Shabani Madilu of Tanzania via unanimous decision in Pinoy Pride IX held in Bacolod, Philippines.

On March 24, 2012, during the Pinoy Pride XIII held in Cebu City, Pagara knocked out Thai visitor Phupha Por Nobnom in the second round.

During the Pinoy Pride 24 on March 1, 2014, Pagara knocked out former WBO Asia-Pacific champion Isack Junior of Indonesia in the very first round at Solaire Resort & Casino, Parañaque. On April 11, 2014, he stopped Indonesian fighter Skak Max via TKO in the third round held in his hometown of Maasin.

Pagara wasted no time by gaining his first-ever title, the IBF International Super Bantamweight belt against Hugo Partida. He demolished the Mexican via TKO in the first round at the Waterfront Hotel & Casino in Cebu City on June 21, 2014.

In his first international fight held at Dubai World Trade Centre, in Dubai, United Arab Emirates on August 7, 2015, Pagara knocked down his Mexican opponent, Jesús Ríos on the very first round, defending his IBF Inter-Continental Super Bantamweight title. The 21-year-old boxer caught Ríos with a strong straight right punch behind the ear that immediately knelt him on the floor. After his foe regained his consciousness, Pagara delivered numerous shots on Ríos' head and made referee Bruce McTavish stop the fight with more than a minute left on the first round while Ríos was literally still holding the ropes.

On July 10, 2016, Pagara sustained the first ever loss in his professional boxing career after his challenger Cesar Juárez of Mexico stopped him (knockout) in the 8th round, leading to Juárez's victory in the main event of Pinoy Pride 37 in San Mateo, California. After the fight, Pagara, with a neck brace attached was taken out of a stretcher and rushed to the Stanford Hospital in nearby Palo Alto. He was later cleared by the doctors after undergoing several tests.

Pagara was scheduled to face Curmel Moton on December 30, 2024, in Tokyo, Japan. The matchup announced for the undercard of Ryan Garcia vs Rukiya Anpo was canceled after the main event bout fell through due to injury suffered by Garcia.

On 23 May 2025, he faced Bakhodur Usmonov for the vacant WBA Gold lightweight title at the Tennis Palace and Water Sports Complex in Dushanbe, Tajikistan, losing by knockout in the third round.

== Controversies ==
On September 1, 2021, Pagara was arrested in Cebu City for allegedly molesting and raping a 14-year-old girl. According to relatives of the alleged victim, the incident happened around 4:00 p.m. that same day in Pagara's house. Pagara did not resist arrest but denied the accusations. The following night, Pagara reportedly attempted suicide by self-strangulation in his jail cell but was saved by his fellow detainees. However, police denied that any suicide attempt occurred. He was released after posting ₱100,000 bail on September 8.

== Professional boxing record ==
40 fights	37 wins	3 losses
By knockout	26	2
By decision	11	1
Draws	0	

No.	Result	Record	Opponent	Type	Round, time	Date	Location	Notes
40	Loss	37–3	Billy Polkinghorn	UD	8	Mar 7, 2026	Perth Convention and Exhibition Centre, Perth, Australia	For WBC Australasian lightweight title
39	Win	37–2	Nithit Sangasang	KO	1 (4), 1:08	Nov 15, 2025	Highland Boxing, Udom Suksa School, Bangkok, Thailand	
38	Win	36–2	Butsakon Mungchueklang	TKO	1 (4), 0:34	Sep 13, 2025	Highland Boxing, Udom Suksa School, Bangkok, Thailand	
37	Loss	35–2	Bakhodur Usmonov	KO	3 (10), 2:52	May 23, 2025	Tennis Palace and Water Sports Complex, Dushanbe, Tajikistan	For vacant WBA Gold and IBA Pro Intercontinental lightweight title
36	Win	35–1	Aketelieti Yelejian	MD	10	Jun 15, 2024	City of Passi Arena, Passi, Philippines	Won vacant IBF Asia lightweight title
35	Win	34–1	Allan Villanueva	RTD	4 (8), 3:00	Nov 5, 2022	Talisay City Sports Complex, Talisay City, Philippines	
34	Win	33–1	Virgil Puton	UD	10	Dec 18, 2020	IPI Gym Compound, Mandaue, Cebu, Philippines	
33	Win	32–1	Ratchanon Sawangsoda	TKO	1 (10), 2:53	Aug 17, 2019	Superdome, Ormoc, Leyte, Philippines	
32	Win	31–1	George Krampah	KO	1 (12), 2:55	Nov 24, 2018	IEC Convention Center, Cebu City, Cebu, Philippines	Retained WBO Inter-Continental super bantamweight title.
31	Win	30–1	Laryea Gabriel Odoi	TKO	3 (12), 2:30	Jun 9, 2018	Maasin City Gym, Maasin, Southern Leyte, Philippines	Won vacant WBO Inter-Continental super bantamweight title.
30	Win	29–1	Mohammed Kambuluta	KO	2 (10), 2:26	Nov 25, 2017	Bohol Wisdom School Gym, Tagbilaran, Bohol, Philippines	
29	Win	28–1	Aekkawee Kaewmanee	KO	4 (10), 2:59	Jul 8, 2017	IEC Convention Center, Cebu City, Cebu, Philippines	
28	Win	27–1	Raymond Commey	UD	12	Nov 26, 2016	Cebu Coliseum, Cebu City, Cebu, Philippines	
27	Loss	26–1	Cesar Juárez	KO	8 (12), 0:15	Jul 9, 2016	San Mateo Event Center, San Mateo, California, U.S.	Lost WBO Inter-Continental super bantamweight title.
26	Win	26–0	Yesner Talavera	UD	12	Feb 27, 2016	Waterfront Cebu City Hotel & Casino, Cebu City, Cebu, Philippines	Won vacant WBO Inter-Continental super bantamweight title.
25	Win	25–0	William Gonzalez	KO	6 (12), 2:20	Oct 17, 2015	StubHub Center, Carson, California, U.S.	Retained IBF Inter-Continental super bantamweight title
24	Win	24–0	Jesús Ríos	TKO	1 (12), 1:00	Aug 7, 2015	World Trade Centre, Sheikh Zayed Road, Dubai, United Arab Emirates	Retained IBF Inter-Continental super bantamweight title
23	Win	23–0	Rodolfo Hernández	RTD	5 (12), 3:00	Mar 28, 2015	Araneta Coliseum, Quezon City, Metro Manila, Philippines	Retained IBF Inter-Continental super bantamweight title
22	Win	22–0	Raúl Hirales Jr.	UD	12	Nov 15, 2014	Waterfront Cebu City Hotel & Casino, Cebu City, Cebu, Philippines	Retained IBF Inter-Continental super bantamweight title
21	Win	21–0	Hugo Partida	TKO	1 (12), 1:18	Jun 21, 2014	Waterfront Cebu City Hotel & Casino, Cebu City, Cebu, Philippines	Won IBF Inter-Continental super bantamweight title
20	Win	20–0	Skak Max	TKO	3 (10), 1:33	Apr 11, 2014	Maasin City Gym, Maasin, Southern Leyte, Philippines	
19	Win	19–0	Isack Junior	KO	1 (10), 2:41	Mar 1, 2014	Solaire Resort & Casino, Parañaque, Metro Manila, Philippines	
18	Win	18–0	Gadwin Tubigon	UD	10	Dec 7, 2013	Freedom Park, Dumaguete, Negros Oriental, Philippines	
17	Win	17–0	Khunkhiri Wor Wisaruth	TKO	2 (8), 2:29	Jul 13, 2013	Solaire Resort & Casino, Parañaque, Metro Manila, Philippines	
16	Win	16–0	Jessie Tuyor	UD	10	Apr 6, 2013	Dauin, Negros Oriental, Philippines	
15	Win	15–0	Jilo Martin	TKO	3 (10), 1:38	Jan 20, 2013	Gaisano Country Mall Parking Lot, Cebu City, Cebu, Philippines	
14	Win	14–0	Komgrich Nantapech	KO	2 (10), 1:45	Nov 15, 2012	Maasin City Gym, Maasin, Southern Leyte, Philippines	
13	Win	13–0	Marvin Tampus	UD	10	Sep 28, 2012	Mayor Esperanza Binghay Memorial Complex, Balamban, Cebu, Philippines	
12	Win	12–0	Alvin Makiling	UD	8	Aug 18, 2012	Waterfront Cebu City Hotel & Casino, Cebu City, Cebu, Philippines	
11	Win	11–0	Phupha Por Nobnom	KO	2 (8), 2:38	Mar 24, 2012	Waterfront Cebu City Hotel & Casino, Cebu City, Cebu, Philippines	
10	Win	10–0	Lowie Bantigue	TKO	3 (10), 0:25	Jan 15, 2012	Gaisano Country Mall Parking Lot, Cebu City, Cebu, Philippines	
9	Win	9–0	Henry Acha	KO	3 (8), 2:59	Nov 21, 2011	Maasin City Gym, Maasin, Southern Leyte, Philippines	
8	Win	8–0	Shabani Madilu	UD	8	Oct 8, 2011	University of St. La Salle Coliseum, Bacolod, Negros Occidental, Philippines	
7	Win	7–0	Rogen Flores	TKO	4 (8), 2:43	Aug 16, 2011	Maasin City Gym, Maasin, Southern Leyte, Philippines	
6	Win	6–0	Saddam Alin	KO	3 (6), 1:50	Jul 30, 2011	Hoops Dome, Lapu-Lapu, Philippines	
5	Win	5–0	Anthony Galigao	KO	1 (6), 1:09	May 20, 2011	Maasin City Gym, Maasin, Southern Leyte, Philippines	
4	Win	4–0	Robert Awetin	UD	6	Apr 9, 2011	University of St. La Salle Coliseum, Bacolod, Negros Occidental, Philippines	
3	Win	3–0	Camilo Rey Seneres	TKO	1 (4), 2:21	Mar 19, 2011	Waterfront Cebu City Hotel & Casino, Cebu City, Cebu, Philippines	
2	Win	2–0	Jeffrey Galsim	KO	1 (4), 1:02	Jan 29, 2011	Waterfront Cebu City Hotel & Casino, Cebu City, Cebu, Philippines	
1	Win	1–0	Sandy Cajil	TKO	2 (4), 0:37	Jan 15, 2011	I.T Park, Cebu City, Cebu, Philippines	

== IBA professional boxing record ==
1 fight	0 wins	1 loss
By knockout	0	1

No.	Result	Record	Opponent	Type	Round, time	Date	Location	Notes
1	Loss	0–1	Albert Batyrgaziev	TKO	4 (10), 3:00	Oct 17, 2024	Ufa Arena, Ufa, Russia	For vacant IBA lightweight title; Pagara unable to continue due to an injury on his left arm

== Exhibition boxing record ==
4 fights	0 wins	0 losses
Draws	1	
Non-scored	3	

No.	Result	Record	Opponent	Type	Round, time	Date	Location	Notes
4	—N/a	0–0–1 (3)	MJ Uduna	—N/a	2	Feb 3, 2024	Benguet Sports Complex, La Trinidad, Benguet, Philippines	Non-scored bout
3	Draw	0–0–1 (2)	Lorence Rosas	PTS	3	Aug 12, 2023	Balayong Sports Complex, Puerto Princesa, Palawan, Philippines	
2	—N/a	0–0 (2)	Dave Peñalosa	—N/a	3	Mar 27, 2023	Compostela, Cebu, Philippines	Non-scored bout
1	—N/a	0–0 (1)	Jhunrick Carcedo	—N/a	3	Jan 28, 2023	Pagara Boxing Gym, Liloan, Cebu, Philippines	Non-scored bout

== See also ==
- List of Filipino boxing world champions
- List of IBF world champions
- List of super-bantamweight boxing champions
