= Curmel Moton =

American boxer

Personal information
- Born: June 4, 2006 (age 20) Salt Lake City, Utah, U.S.
- Height: 5 ft 2 in (157 cm)
- Weight: Super Featherweight; Lightweight

Boxing career
- Reach: 65 in (165 cm)
- Stance: Orthodox

Boxing record
- Total fights: 9
- Wins: 9
- Win by KO: 7

Curmel Moton is an American professional boxer. He is a protege of five-weight world champion boxer Floyd Mayweather.

== Early life ==
Moton was born in Salt Lake City.

== Amateur career ==
Moton had an exemplary amateur career winning over 18 amateur titles. He turned pro with an amateur record of 156–7.

== Professional career ==
Moton made his debut on the undercard of Canelo Alvarez vs Jermell Charlo on September 30, 2023, stopping his opponent in the first round.

Curmel Moton was scheduled to face Albert Pagara in Tokyo, Japan on December 30, 2024. The bout expected on the Ryan Garcia vs Rukiya Anpo undercard didn't go ahead after the main event bout was canceled due to injury suffered by Garcia.

Moton was scheduled to face Frank Zaldivar at T-Mobile Arena in Las Vegas on February 1, 2025. Moton won the fight by knockout in the third round.

On May 31, 2025, Moton defeated Renny Viamonte Mastrapa by unanimous decision, with all three judges scoring the bout 80–72.

After nine months away from the competitive boxing ring, Morton returned against Wilfredo Flores at Turning Stone Resort and Casino in Verona, New York on February 28, 2026, winning when his opponent retired on his stool at the end of the second round.

== Professional boxing record ==
9 fights	9 wins	0 losses
By knockout	7	0
By decision	2	0

No.	Result	Record	Opponent	Type	Round, time	Date	Location	Notes
9	Win	9–0	Wilfredo Flores	RTD	2 (10), 3:00	28 Feb 2026	Turning Stone Resort and Casino, Verona, New York, U.S.	
8	Win	8–0	Renny Mastrapa	UD	6	31 May 2025	Michelob Ultra Arena, Paradise, Nevada, U.S.	
7	Win	7–0	Frank Zaldivar	TKO	3 (8), 1:51	1 Feb 2025	T-Mobile Arena, Paradise, Nevada, U.S.	
6	Win	6–0	Hilario Martinez Moreno	KO	1 (6), 1:35	12 Oct 2024	2300 Arena, Philadelphia, Pennsylvania, U.S.	
5	Win	5–0	Victor Vázquez	KO	1 (6), 0:55	24 Aug 2024	Mexico City Arena, Mexico City, Mexico	
4	Win	4–0	Nikolai Buzolin	KO	2 (6), 1:39	6 Jul 2024	Honda Center, Anaheim, California, U.S.	
3	Win	3–0	Anthony Cuba	UD	8	30 Mar 2024	T-Mobile Arena, Paradise, Nevada, U.S.	
2	Win	2–0	Hunter Turbyfill	KO	1 (4), 2:59	25 Nov 2023	Michelob Ultra Arena, Paradise, Nevada, U.S.	
1	Win	1–0	Ezequiel Flores	TKO	1 (4), 1:48	30 Sep 2023	T-Mobile Arena, Paradise, Nevada, U.S.	
