= Aaron Herrera (boxer) =

Mexican boxer

Aarón Herrera
Personal information
- Nickname: La Joya de Zací
- Born: Aarón Herrera Cen; 11 September 1990 (age 35) Valladolid, Yucatán, Mexico
- Height: 1.82 m (6 ft 0 in)
- Weight: Lightweight; Light welterweight Welterweight

Boxing career
- Reach: 183 cm (72 in)
- Stance: Orthodox

Boxing record
- Total fights: 47
- Wins: 35
- Win by KO: 24
- Losses: 11
- Draws: 1

Aarón Herrera Cen (born 11 September 1990) is a Mexican professional boxer and is the current WBC Mundo Hispano Lightweight Champion.

== Professional career ==
Herrera started boxing as an amateur in the city of Valladolid at the age of 12. His father first trained him before he decided to move to Mérida to train with Román Acosta. He began his professional career in 2006.

On March 23, 2011 Aarón knocked out Lizandro de Los Santos to win the WBC Mundo Hispano lightweight title.

Herrera stayed undefeated until 21 July 2012 when he lost for the first time by decision before Fernando García in Tijuana.

In 2013 Aaron "La Joya" Herrera began his international career fighting in Philippines against Jason Pagara and then in Germany against Turkish boxer Selcuk Aydin. He lost both fights, one by decision and the second one by KO.

After these defeats, Aaron Herrera's career changed radically when he decided to leave his trainer Roman Acosta for the Cuban Julio Tarrago. This change actually seemed to give him a second breath in boxing with a first victory by KO against Enrique "Huracan" Ramos in his native Valladolid in December 2013 and a second victory also by KO against the boxer Manuel Cubanito Mares, seen in the show Campeon Box Azteca.

Controversy arose in March 2015 when Herrera was awarded a TKO victory against Raul Hinojosa by referee David Silva just 1 minute and 39 seconds into the fight, even after seemingly failing to land any blows on his opponent.

== Professional boxing record ==
47 fights	35 wins	11 losses
By knockout	24	6
By decision	11	5
Draws	1	

No.	Result	Record	Opponent	Type	Round, time	Date	Location	Notes
47	Loss	35–11–1	Darwin Price	TKO	2 (10), 2:58	Aug 24, 2019	Bert Ogden Arena, Edinburg, Texas, U.S.	
46	Win	35–10–1	Hector Barraza	TKO	4 (10)	Feb 16, 2019	Plaza de Toros La Coleta, San Cristóbal de las Casas, Mexico	
45	Loss	34–10–1	Mikaël Zewski	UD	10	Dec 1, 2018	Videotron Centre, Montreal, Quebec, Canada	For WBC International welterweight title
44	Loss	34–9–1	Suriel Marin	KO	5 (6), 1:20	Aug 27, 2018	La Feria, Teopisca, Mexico	
43	Win	34–8–1	Luis Enrique Ramos	KO	1 (6), 2:32	Feb 17, 2018	Palenque de Gallos, Comitán, Mexico	
42	Loss	33–8–1	Jessie Vargas	UD	10	Dec 15, 2017	Pioneer Event Center, Lancaster, California, U.S.	
41	Win	33–7–1	Israel Toala	TKO	4 (10), 2:27	Jul 8, 2017	Salon Los Laureles, Comitán, Mexico	
40	Loss	32–7–1	Brandon Ríos	KO	7 (10), 2:11	Jun 11, 2017	Pioneer Event Center, Lancaster, California, U.S.	
39	Win	32–6–1	Mario Alberto Cruz	TKO	8 (10), 0:47	Mar 24, 2017	Auditorio Municipal, Las Rosas, Mexico	
38	Win	31–6–1	Humberto Ocampo	TKO	8 (10), 0:34	Jan 14, 2017	Palenque de Gallos, Comitán, Mexico	
37	Win	30–6–1	Jesus Lopez	TKO	2 (8), 2:50	Oct 30, 2016	Auditorio Municipal, Teopisca, Mexico	
36	Loss	29–6–1	Mike Reed	TKO	6 (8), 3:00	Oct 14, 2016	2300 Arena, Philadelphia, Pennsylvania, U.S.	
35	Loss	29–5–1	Regis Prograis	KO	1 (10), 2:17	Mar 25, 2016	Buffalo Run Casino, Miami, Oklahoma, U.S.	
34	Loss	29–4–1	Pedro Campa	UD	10	Dec 12, 2015	Glendale Civic Auditorium, Glendale, California, U.S.	
33	Win	29–3–1	Raul Hinojosa	TKO	1 (8), 1:25	Mar 28, 2015	Poliforum Zamna, Mérida, Mexico	
32	Win	28–3–1	Wilfrido Buelvas	UD	8	Jan 31, 2015	Palenque de la Feria, Tuxtla Gutiérrez, Mexico	
31	Draw	27–3–1	Jorge Páez Jr.	TD	6 (10), 2:17	Oct 11, 2014	Coliseo Yucatán, Mérida, Mexico	
30	Win	27–3	José David Mosquera	UD	10	Jul 5, 2014	Complejo Deportivo La Inalámbrica, Mérida, Mexico	
29	Win	26–3	Misael Castillo	UD	8	Apr 5, 2014	Arena Tecate, Tijuana, Mexico	
28	Loss	25–3	Selçuk Aydın	KO	8 (10), 2:29	Jul 27, 2013	Kugelbake-Halle, Cuxhaven, Germany	
27	Loss	25–2	Jason Pagara	UD	12	May 25, 2013	Waterfront Cebu City Hotel & Casino, Cebu, Philippines	For WBO International super lightweight title
26	Win	25–1	Jorge Pimentel	KO	1 (10), 2:10	Nov 3, 2012	Centro de Usos Multiples, Hermosillo, Mexico	
25	Loss	24–1	Fernando Garcia	UD	8	Jul 21, 2012	Auditorio Municipal, Tijuana, Mexico	
24	Win	24–0	Zaid Zavaleta	TKO	1 (8), 2:37	Apr 21, 2012	Unidad Deportiva Centenario, Morelia, Mexico	
23	Win	23–0	Joksan Hernandez	UD	10	Feb 25, 2012	Centro de Convenciones Siglo XXI, Mérida, Mexico	
22	Win	22–0	Adalberto Borquez	UD	10	Nov 26, 2011	Recinto Ferial de Xmatkuil, Mérida, Mexico	
21	Win	21–0	Carlos Winston Velasquez	SD	10	Aug 20, 2011	La Cetto Vineyard, Guadalupe, Mexico	
20	Win	20–0	Alirio Rivera	TKO	6 (12), 1:09	Jun 11, 2011	Complejo Deportivo La Inalámbrica, Mérida, Mexico	
19	Win	19–0	Lisandro de los Santos	TKO	2 (12), 1:33	Mar 23, 2011	Plaza de Toros de Mérida, Mérida, Mexico	
18	Win	18–0	Marino Mercado	TKO	4 (8)	Dec 18, 2010	Estadio 20 de Noviembre, Campeche City, Mexico	
17	Win	17–0	Jose Yanez	TKO	2 (8), 1:58	Nov 17, 2010	Recinto Ferial de Xmatkuil, Mérida, Mexico	
16	Win	16–0	Eugenio Lopez	TKO	4 (8), 1:25	Oct 2, 2010	Poliforum Zamna, Mérida, Mexico	
15	Win	15–0	Manuel Garcia	SD	6	Feb 6, 2010	Complejo Deportivo La Inalámbrica, Mérida, Mexico	
14	Win	14–0	Jose Ramirez	KO	1 (6), 2:40	Nov 21, 2009	Recinto Ferial de Xmatkuil, Mérida, Mexico	
13	Win	13–0	Jose Arelis Lopez	UD	6	Oct 31, 2009	Complejo Deportivo La Inalámbrica, Mérida, Mexico	
12	Win	12–0	Ramon Mendez	KO	1 (6), 2:16	Sep 25, 2009	Centro de Convenciones Siglo XXI, Mérida, Mexico	
11	Win	11–0	Jesus Casares	KO	2 (4), 2:19	Jun 19, 2009	Centro de Convenciones Siglo XXI, Mérida, Mexico	
10	Win	10–0	Josias Juan Juan	TKO	4 (6)	Mar 6, 2009	Centro de Convenciones Siglo XXI, Mérida, Mexico	
9	Win	9–0	Jairo Hernandez	UD	4	Aug 23, 2008	Valladolid, Mexico	
8	Win	8–0	Carlos Mario Sanchez	UD	4	Apr 12, 2008	Auditorio Solidaridad, Valladolid, Mexico	
7	Win	7–0	Edgar Mercado	KO	3 (4)	Sep 22, 2007	Auditorio Solidaridad, Valladolid, Mexico	
6	Win	6–0	Antonio Martinez	UD	4	Jul 2, 2007	Auditorio Solidaridad, Valladolid, Mexico	
5	Win	5–0	Edwin Velasquez	KO	4 (4)	Mar 31, 2007	Auditorio Solidaridad, Valladolid, Mexico	
4	Win	4–0	Jeremias Osorio	KO	2 (4)	Mar 10, 2007	Deportivo San Juan, Valladolid, Mexico	
3	Win	3–0	Leopoldo Macho Puga	KO	2 (4)	Feb 13, 2007	Deportivo San Juan, Valladolid, Mexico	
2	Win	2–0	Jesus Cruz	KO	1 (4)	Nov 25, 2006	Deportivo San Juan, Valladolid, Mexico	
1	Win	1–0	Melvin Cepeda	KO	1	Sep 6, 2006	Parque Principal, Valladolid, Mexico	
