= Yusuke Kobori =

Japanese boxer (born 1981)

Yusuke Kobori 小堀 佑介
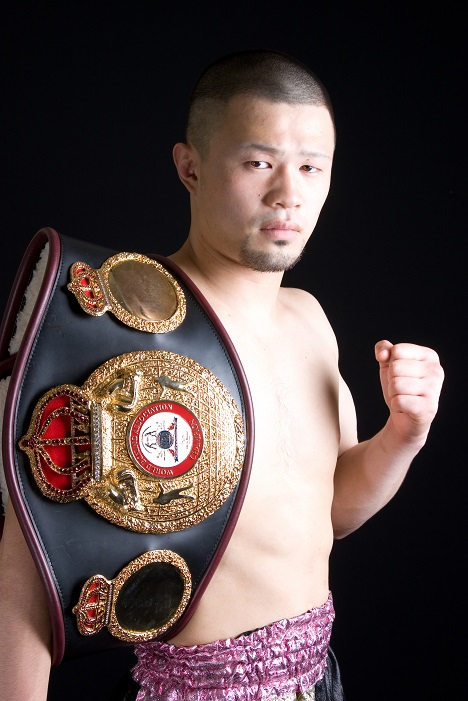

Personal information
- Born: October 11, 1981 (age 44) Yotsukaidō, Chiba, Japan
- Height: 5 ft 7 1/2 in (171 cm)
- Weight: Super featherweight; Lightweight

Boxing career
- Reach: 67 1/2 in (171 cm)
- Stance: Orthodox

Boxing record
- Total fights: 27
- Wins: 23
- Win by KO: 12
- Losses: 3
- Draws: 1

Yusuke Kobori (小堀 佑介, born October 11, 1981) is a retired professional boxer from Japan and a former WBA lightweight champion.

== Professional career ==
Kobori won the Japanese super featherweight title on January 14, 2006 by knocking out Keita Manabe in the second round. He went on to defend it 6 times.

Later, he took on Nicaraguan José Alfaro for the WBA lightweight title on May 19, 2008. Although he was backed against the ropes and counted in the second round, Kobori was able to carry on strong in the fight. In the third round, after doing a lot of defense, Kobori landed a punch which sent Alfaro to the canvass. Alfaro managed to beat the count but was in an unsteady state. Kobori charged to land a series of punches, prompting the referee to wave the fight off. With the win, Kobori became Japan's third world champion at lightweight and first since Takanori Hatakeyama in 2000.

Kobori attempted to defend his title against Paulus Moses on January 3, 2009. He, however, lost the match and the crown by unanimous decision.

While training for his next bout, Kobori developed serious neck and waist problems which prompted him to quit boxing.

He worked as a trainer for the Kadoebi Boxing Gym from 2016 to 2019.

== Professional boxing record ==
| 27 fights | 23 wins | 3 losses |
|---|---|---|
| By knockout | 12 | 1 |
| By decision | 11 | 2 |
| Draws | 1 | |

| No. | Result | Record | Opponent | Type | Round, time | Date | Location | Notes |
|---|---|---|---|---|---|---|---|---|
| 27 | Loss | 23–3–1 | Paulus Moses | UD | 12 (12) | 2009-01-03 | Pacifico, Yokohama, Japan | Lost (Regular) WBA lightweight title |
| 26 | Win | 23–2–1 | José Alfaro | TKO | 3 (12) | 2008-05-19 | Differ Ariake, Tokyo, Japan | Won (Regular) WBA lightweight title |
| 25 | Win | 22–2–1 | Hiroyasu Matsuzaki | UD | 10 (10) | 2008-01-05 | Korakuen Hall, Tokyo, Japan | Retained Japanese super-featherweight title |
| 24 | Win | 21–2–1 | Takashi Miura | UD | 10 (10) | 2007-09-15 | Korakuen Hall, Tokyo, Japan | Retained Japanese super-featherweight title |
| 23 | Win | 20–2–1 | Junji Murakami | TKO | 7 (12) | 2007-05-19 | Korakuen Hall, Tokyo, Japan | Retained Japanese super-featherweight title; Won vacant OBPF super-featherweight title |
| 22 | Win | 19–2–1 | Dainoshin Kuma | TKO | 3 (10) | 2007-01-06 | Korakuen Hall, Tokyo, Japan | Retained Japanese super-featherweight title |
| 21 | Win | 18–2–1 | Akio Mikami | TD | 10 (10) | 2006-11-04 | Korakuen Hall, Tokyo, Japan | Retained Japanese super-featherweight title |
| 20 | Win | 17–2–1 | Kazunori Fujita | TKO | 6 (10) | 2006-05-06 | Korakuen Hall, Tokyo, Japan | Retained Japanese super-featherweight title |
| 19 | Win | 16–2–1 | Keita Manabe | TKO | 2 (10) | 2006-01-14 | Korakuen Hall, Tokyo, Japan | Won vacant Japanese super-featherweight title |
| 18 | Win | 15–2–1 | Tetsuya Suzuki | TKO | 4 (8) | 2005-08-06 | Korakuen Hall, Tokyo, Japan | |
| 17 | Win | 14–2–1 | Akira Yamazaki | UD | 10 (10) | 2005-05-12 | Korakuen Hall, Tokyo, Japan | |
| 16 | Draw | 13–2–1 | Akira Yamazaki | TD | 9 (10) | 2004-12-18 | Korakuen Hall, Tokyo, Japan | |
| 15 | Win | 13–2 | Momotaro Kitajima | UD | 8 (8) | 2004-09-04 | Korakuen Hall, Tokyo, Japan | |
| 14 | Win | 12–2 | Masato Aoyagi | TKO | 6 (10) | 2004-05-23 | Kose Sports Park, Kōfu, Japan | |
| 13 | Win | 11–2 | Tetsuya Shinozaki | MD | 10 (10) | 2003-12-10 | Korakuen Hall, Tokyo, Japan | |
| 12 | Win | 10–2 | Ryuji Nishihara | UD | 8 (8) | 2003-06-23 | Arena, Yokohama, Japan | |
| 11 | Loss | 9–2 | Takanori Kariya | MD | 8 (8) | 2003-05-03 | Korakuen Hall, Tokyo, Japan | |
| 10 | Win | 9–1 | Jaguar Tetsuya | UD | 10 (10) | 2003-01-11 | Korakuen Hall, Tokyo, Japan | |
| 9 | Win | 8–1 | Premsiri Napattaya | KO | 1 (8) | 2002-10-05 | Korakuen Hall, Tokyo, Japan | |
| 8 | Win | 7–1 | Zenyu Shakuson | TKO | 8 (8) | 2002-06-01 | Korakuen Hall, Tokyo, Japan | |
| 7 | Win | 6–1 | Kenta Uemura | TKO | 2 (6) | 2002-04-03 | Korakuen Hall, Tokyo, Japan | |
| 6 | Win | 5–1 | Seishiro Tashiro | MD | 6 (6) | 2002-02-13 | Korakuen Hall, Tokyo, Japan | |
| 5 | Win | 4–1 | Yoshiro Yagihashi | KO | 1 (4) | 2001-10-17 | Korakuen Hall, Tokyo, Japan | |
| 4 | Win | 3–1 | Kei Sano | UD | 4 (4) | 2001-08-04 | Korakuen Hall, Tokyo, Japan | |
| 3 | Loss | 2–1 | Yuji Onozaki | KO | 2 (4) | 2001-04-07 | Korakuen Hall, Tokyo, Japan | |
| 2 | Win | 2–0 | Ryoji Nakai | UD | 4 (4) | 2000-08-05 | Korakuen Hall, Tokyo, Japan | |
| 1 | Win | 1–0 | Makoto Sato | KO | 2 (4) | 2000-02-19 | Korakuen Hall, Tokyo, Japan | |

== See also ==
- Boxing in Japan
- List of Japanese boxing world champions
- List of world lightweight boxing champions

Sporting positions
Regional boxing titles
| Vacant Title last held by Nobuhito Honmo | Japanese super-featherweight champion January 14, 2006 – 2008; Vacated | Vacant Title next held by Yoshimitsu Yashiro |
| Vacant Title last held by Nobuhito Honmo | OBPF super-featherweight champion May 19, 2007 – 2007; Vacated | Vacant Title next held by Takashi Uchiyama |
World boxing titles
| Preceded by José Alfaro | WBA lightweight champion Regular title May 19, 2008 – January 3, 2009 | Succeeded by Paulus Moses |
