= José Alfaro (boxer) =

Nicaraguan boxer (born 1983)

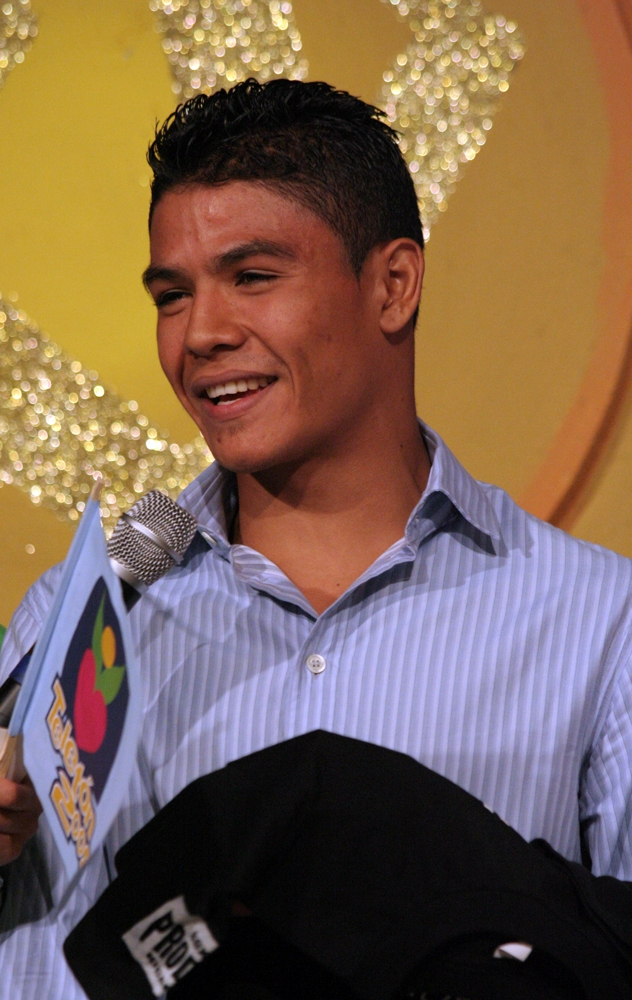
- Alfaro (2008)

Personal information
- Nickname: Quiebra Jicara
- Born: José Alberto Gazo; November 22, 1983 (age 42) Managua, Nicaragua
- Height: 5 ft 9 1/2 in (177 cm)
- Weight: Lightweight; Light welterweight

Boxing career
- Reach: 71 1/2 in (182 cm)
- Stance: Orthodox

Boxing record
- Total fights: 48
- Wins: 31
- Win by KO: 25
- Losses: 14
- Draws: 1
- No contests: 2

José Alberto Gazo (born November 22, 1983), known as José Alfaro, is a Nicaraguan boxer.

== Professional career ==
=== Vs. Prawet Singwancha ===
He captured the vacant WBA lightweight title against Thai Prawet Singwancha in a split decision on December 29, 2007 in Bielefeld, Germany.

=== Vs. Yusuke Kobori ===
He later lost that title on May 19, 2008 to Yusuke Kobori who knocked him out in only 3 rounds.

=== Vs. Erik Morales ===
His next match was against Mexican legend Erik Morales on March 27, 2010 for the vacant WBC International Welterweight. He lost via Unanimous Decision the scores were 117-111, 116-112,116-112.

== Professional boxing record ==
48 fights	31 wins	14 losses
By knockout	25	11
By decision	5	3
By disqualification	1	0
Draws	1	
No contests	2	

No.	Result	Record	Opponent	Type	Round, time	Date	Location	Notes
48	Loss	31–14–1 (2)	Avious Griffin	KO	2 (8)	2023-03-25	Boardwalk Hall, Atlantic City, New Jersey, U.S.	
47	Loss	31–13–1 (2)	Kevin Hayler Brown	TKO	2 (8)	2022-08-21	Caribe Royale Orlando, Orlando, Florida, U.S.	
46	Loss	31–12–1 (2)	David Theroux	TKO	6 (10)	2019-02-16	Montreal Casino, Montreal, Quebec, Canada	
45	Win	31–11–1 (2)	Pascual Salgado	DQ	2 (8)	2017-12-15	Puerto Salvador Allende, Managua, Nicaragua	
44	Win	30–11–1 (2)	Reno Reyes	UD	8 (8)	2017-10-13	Cancha Municipal, Malpaisillo, Nicaragua	
43	Win	29–11–1 (2)	Jesus Vidal	KO	2 (8)	2017-07-14	Centro Recreativo Edgardo Corea, Nagarote, Nicaragua	
42	Loss	28–11–1 (2)	Jason Pagara	KO	1 (10)	2016-11-26	Cebu Coliseum, Cebu City, Philippines	
41	Loss	28–10–1 (2)	Pedro Campa	RTD	4 (10)	2016-04-30	Malecón Turistico, Guaymas, Mexico	
40	NC	28–9–1 (2)	Jose Zepeda	NC	1 (10)	2015-10-31	Auditorio Fausto Gutierrez Moreno, Tijuana, Mexico	
39	Win	28–9–1 (1)	Gonzalo Munguia	TKO	10 (10)	2015-07-17	Centro Recreativo Edgardo Corea, Nagarote, Nicaragua	
38	Loss	27–9–1 (1)	Eduard Troyanovsky	TKO	5 (12)	2014-10-24	Luzhniki Palace of Sports, Moscow, Russia	
37	Win	27–8–1 (1)	Marcos Mojica	KO	7 (10)	2014-03-15	Holiday Inn Hotel, Managua, Nicaragua	
36	Draw	26–8–1 (1)	Wiston Campos	SD	10 (10)	2012-09-08	Gimnasio Alexis Arguello, Managua, Nicaragua	For Nicaraguan lightweight title
35	Win	26–8 (1)	Gonzalo Munguia	MD	10 (10)	2012-02-17	Pharaoh's Casino, Managua, Nicaragua	
34	Loss	25–8 (1)	Humberto Soto	TKO	2 (10)	2011-09-03	Estadio Centenario, Los Mochis, Mexico	
33	Win	25–7 (1)	Eduardo Becerril	RTD	4 (10)	2011-05-06	Pharaoh's Casino, Managua, Nicaragua	
32	Loss	24–7 (1)	Yoshihiro Kamegai	KO	6 (10)	2010-10-24	Ryōgoku Kokugikan, Tokyo, Japan	
31	Win	24–6 (1)	Joel Juarez Cota	TKO	2 (10)	2010-09-03	Centro de Convenciones, Managua, Nicaragua	
30	Loss	23–6 (1)	Erik Morales	UD	12 (12)	2010-03-27	Arena Monterrey, Monterrey, Mexico	For vacant WBC International welterweight title
29	Loss	23–5 (1)	Antonio DeMarco	TKO	10 (12)	2009-10-31	Treasure Island Hotel and Casino, Paradise, Nevada, U.S.	For interim WBC lightweight title
28	Win	23–4 (1)	Moises Castro	UD	10 (10)	2009-06-06	Polideportivo España, Managua, Nicaragua	
27	Win	22–4 (1)	Carlos Winston Velasquez	KO	8 (10)	2009-02-13	Pharaoh's Casino, Managua, Nicaragua	
26	Win	21–4 (1)	Baudel Cardenas	TKO	3 (10)	2008-11-28	Pharaoh's Casino, Managua, Nicaragua	
25	Loss	20–4 (1)	Yusuke Kobori	TKO	3 (12)	2008-05-19	Differ Ariake, Tokyo, Japan	Lost (Regular) WBA lightweight title
24	Win	20–3 (1)	Prawet Singwancha	SD	12 (12)	2007-12-29	Seidensticker Halle, Bielefeld, Germany	Won vacant (Regular) WBA lightweight title
23	Win	19–3 (1)	Rosano Lawrence	KO	2 (10)	2007-07-13	Pharaoh's Casino, Managua, Nicaragua	Won vacant WBA Fedebol lightweight title
22	Win	18–3 (1)	DeMarcus Corley	TKO	8 (10)	2007-05-12	Pharaoh's Casino, Managua, Nicaragua	
21	Win	17–3 (1)	Arturo Gomez	KO	2 (10)	2007-03-30	Pharaoh's Casino, Managua, Nicaragua	
20	Win	16–3 (1)	Leonardo Gonzalez	KO	5 (8)	2007-02-16	Pharaoh's Casino, Managua, Nicaragua	
19	Win	15–3 (1)	Haroldo Carvajal	KO	2 (6)	2006-12-15	Pharaoh's Casino, Managua, Nicaragua	
18	Loss	14–3 (1)	Miguel Acosta	UD	10 (10)	2006-10-06	Pharaoh's Casino, Managua, Nicaragua	For vacant WBA Fedecentro lightweight title
17	Loss	14–2 (1)	César Cuenca	MD	10 (10)	2006-05-12	Orfeo Superdomo, Córdoba, Argentina	For vacant WBA Fedecaribe light-welterweight title
16	Win	14–1 (1)	Carlos Ramon Mairena	TKO	5 (10)	2006-03-03	Pharaoh's Casino, Managua, Nicaragua	
15	Loss	13–1(1)	Santos Benavides	KO	10 (10)	2005-10-15	Gimnasio Alexis Arguello, Managua, Nicaragua	
14	Win	13–0 (1)	Antonio Osorio	RTD	6 (10)	2005-09-30	Pharaoh's Casino, Managua, Nicaragua	
13	Win	12–0 (1)	Julio Gamez	TKO	2 (10)	2005-08-19	Pharaoh's Casino, Managua, Nicaragua	
12	Win	11–0 (1)	Orlando Membreno	MD	10 (10)	2005-05-13	Pharaoh's Casino, Managua, Nicaragua	
11	Win	10–0 (1)	Noel Gomez	KO	2 (10)	2005-04-01	Pharaoh's Casino, Managua, Nicaragua	
10	NC	9–0 (1)	Orlando Membreno	NC	3 (10)	2005-02-18	Pharaoh's Casino, Managua, Nicaragua	
9	Win	9–0	Jaime Vargas	TKO	1 (10)	2004-12-16	Gimnasio Alexis Arguello, Managua, Nicaragua	
8	Win	8–0	Genaro Rios	KO	3 (10)	2004-10-30	Holiday Inn Hotel, Managua, Nicaragua	
7	Win	7–0	Marcio Gutierrez	KO	1 (10)	2004-09-30	Gimnasio Alexis Arguello, Managua, Nicaragua	
6	Win	6–0	Jose Velasquez	KO	1 (6)	2004-08-19	Gimnasio Alexis Arguello, Managua, Nicaragua	
5	Win	5–0	Yader Polanco	KO	6 (6)	2004-06-26	Pharaoh's Casino, Managua, Nicaragua	
4	Win	4–0	Haroldo Carvajal	KO	1 (4)	2004-05-13	Gimnasio Alexis Arguello, Managua, Nicaragua	
3	Win	3–0	Guillermo Guido	KO	1 (8)	2004-04-24	Gimnasio Roger Deshon, Managua, Nicaragua	
2	Win	2–0	Andres Garcia	KO	1 (6)	2004-04-03	Gimnasio Alexis Arguello, Managua, Nicaragua	
1	Win	1–0	Julio Lindo	TKO	1 (4)	2004-02-28	Estadio Municipal, Ciudad Sandino, Nicaragua	

== See also ==
- List of world lightweight boxing champions

Sporting positions
Regional boxing titles
Vacant Title last held by Carlos Urias Guerena	WBA Fedebol lightweight champion July 13, 2007 – December 29, 2007; Won world title	Vacant Title next held by Freddy Mamani
World boxing titles
New title	WBA lightweight champion Regular title December 29, 2007 – May 19, 2008	Succeeded by Yusuke Kobori
