= Canelo Álvarez vs. Ryan Rhodes =

2011 boxing competition

Verde y Oro
- Date: June 18, 2011
- Venue: Arena VFG, Guadalajara, Jalisco, Mexico
- Title on the line: WBC super welterweight title

Tale of the tape
| Boxer | (Mexico) Saúl Álvarez | (United Kingdom) Ryan Rhodes |
| Nickname | "Canelo" | "Spice Boy" |
| Hometown | Guadalajara, Jalisco, Mexico | Sheffield, South Yorkshire, UK |
| Pre-fight record | 36–0–1 (26 KO) | 45–4 (31 KO) |
| Age | 20 years, 11 months | 34 years, 6 months |
| Height | 5 ft 8 in (173 cm) | 5 ft 9 in (175 cm) |
| Weight | 153.2 lb (69 kg) | 152.8 lb (69 kg) |
| Style | Orthodox | Orthodox |
| Recognition | WBC; Super Welterweight Champion; The Ring; No. 9 Ranked Light Middleweight | WBC; No. 3 Ranked Super Welterweight; The Ring; No. 4 Ranked Light Middleweight; European super welterweight champion |

Result
- Álvarez wins via 12th-round TKO

Canelo Álvarez vs. Ryan Rhodes was a professional boxing match contested on June 18, 2011, for the WBC super welterweight championship. The bout was held at Arena VFG in Guadalajara, Jalisco, Mexico and was televised on HBO.

== Background ==
After his dominate victory over Matthew Hatton to win the vacant super welterweight belt over Matthew Hatton on 5 March 2011, Canelo Álvarez quickly signed to make his first defence against European super welterweight champion Ryan Rhodes.

Harold Lederman, HBO's unofficial ringside judge called the Litzau and Broner bout with Bob Papa. Roy Jones Jr. was pulled from that fight and was back on for the main-event, because his promotional company has a relationship with Litzau.

== The fight ==
Álvarez would overwhelm Rhodes with his accurate punching with both hands. Álvarez would open up cuts under both of Rhodes' eyes and would drop him with a right hand behind the ear in the fourth round. In the final round, Álvarez would land a right hand in the opening minute that hurt Rhodes. With less than a minute left in the bout when a flurry caused Rhodes to take a step back and cover up with Álvarez throwing power shots against Rhodes who was not able to respond, which prompted the referee wave off the bout at the same moment Rhodes' trainer Dave Coldwell chose to throw in the towel.

== Aftermath ==
Alfredo Angulo, Cornelius Bundrage, Kermit Cintron, Miguel Cotto, Vanes Martirosyan and Sechew Powell were all mentioned as potential next opponents for Álvarez.

The fight averaged 1.6 million viewers on HBO.

== Undercard ==
Confirmed bouts:

=== Televised ===
- Super welterweight championship (Mexico) Canelo Álvarez vs. (United Kingdom) Ryan Rhodes
  - Álvarez defeated Rhodes via technical knockout at 0:48 in the twelve round.
- Super featherweight bout: (United States) Jason Litzau vs. (United States) Adrien Broner
  - Broner defeated Litzau via technical knockout at 2:58 in the first round.

=== Preliminary card ===
- Featherweight bout: (Mexico) Sergio Villanueva vs. (Colombia) Onalvi Sierra
  - Villanueva defeated Sierra via unanimous decision.
- Super featherweight bout: (Mexico) José Manuel Osório vs. (Colombia) Alexander Monterrosa
  - Osório defeated Monterrosa via technical knockout.
- Light heavyweight bout: (Mexico) Marco Antonio Periban vs. (Mexico) Alfredo Contreras
  - Periban defeated Contreras via unanimous decision.
- Light welterweight bout: (Mexico) Carlos Pérez vs. (Mexico) Cesar Figueroa
  - Figueroa defeated Pérez via technical knockout in the second round.
- Flyweight bout: (Mexico) Jesús Jiménez vs. (Mexico) Patricio Camacho
  - Jiménez defeated Camacho via knockout at 1:18 in the third round.
- Featherweight bout: (United Kingdom) Gary Buckland vs. (Mexico) Jose Roberto Gonzalez
  - Buckland defeated Gonzalez via unanimous decision.

== Broadcasting ==
| Country | Broadcaster |
|---|---|
| Hungary | Sport 2 |
| Mexico | Televisa |
| United Kingdom | Sky Sports |
| United States | HBO |

| Preceded by vs. Matthew Hatton | Canelo Álvarez's bouts 18 July 2011 | Succeeded by vs. Alfonso Gomez |
| Preceded by vs. Rocky Junior | Ryan Rhodes's bouts 18 July 2011 | Succeeded by vs. Sergey Khomitsky |
