= Reynaldo Bautista =

Filipino boxer (born 1986)

Rey Bautista
Personal information
- Nickname: Boom Boom
- Nationality: Filipino
- Born: Reynaldo Bautista; June 19, 1986 (age 40) Candijay, Bohol, Philippines
- Height: 5 ft 6 in (1.68 m)
- Weight: Featherweight

Boxing career
- Stance: Orthodox

Boxing record
- Total fights: 39
- Wins: 36
- Win by KO: 25
- Losses: 3
- Draws: 0

Reynaldo "Rey" Bautista (born June 19, 1986, in Candijay, Bohol, Philippines), more commonly known as Boom Boom Bautista, is a retired Filipino professional boxer who once fought for the WBO junior featherweight title. He currently resides in Tagbilaran City, Bohol.

== Early life ==
Bautista spent his early childhood in the fields, growing rice with his family. Craving to live a better and more successful life, he turned to boxing at a very young age. Bautista, at the time, was discovered by Nemi Monton (ABAP Region VII president and chair for Boxing Development of the Bohol PSC), who allowed the young Bautista to fight in amateur bouts, within the island province of Bohol. Fed up with poverty, Bautista turned pro just a week shy before his 17th birthday, hoping to find a better opportunity.

=== Early career at Bantamweight ===
On June 12, 2003, in the Gaisano Country Mall in Cebu, Philippines, Bautista made his professional debut. He won a shutout, unanimous decision (UD) through six rounds against Reyco Compendio. At only 17 years of age, Bautista showed much potential.

After winning his next seven fights, Bautista compiled an undefeated record of eight wins, and 0 losses (8–0). With only eight fights under his belt, the young Bautista campaigned in Indonesia, South Korea, and Japan for his next three fights. Impressively, he won all three bouts. Bautista defeated Indonesian, Hengky Wuwungan when the referee stopped the fight to prevent Wuwungan from receiving any further damage. Bautista then faced South Korean, Hwi-Jong Kim, whom he defeated by a split decision (SD) through ten rounds. Then Bautista followed that up by traveling to Japan to defeat Hirokatsu Yamazaki, when the Japanese retired from the bout right after the third round.

Following the Yamazaki fight, Bautista had the opportunity to fight for his first regional title. On August 17, 2004, in the Sports and Cultural Complex in Mandaue City, Cebu, Bautista defeated Thai fighter, Saensak Singmanasak by second-round TKO for the then vacant WBO Asia Pacific bantamweight title. Bautista defended that title once (against South African Vuyisile Bebe, whom he defeated by a UD through twelve rounds) before he got his first big break in the sport, a chance to show many others his true potential.

=== Super Bantamweight ===
On September 10, 2005, in the Staples Center in Los Angeles, Bautista fought in the undercard of Manny Pacquiao's and Erik Morales' respective fights with both Héctor Velázquez and Zahir Raheem. The then undefeated Bautista was able to defeat his Colombian opponent (Felix Flores) by a third-round KO, impressing many people, which led to him fighting on U.S. soil for the majority of his next few fights. But before he was able to make his three fight campaign in the United States, Bautista needed to defend his WBO Asia Pacific bantamweight title from Tanzanian, Obote Ameme. Bautista was able to do just that, defeating Ameme by a second-round TKO.

Three months later, Bautista started that three fight campaign by defeating Mexican, Gerardo Espinoza by a UD through eight rounds. Five months later, Bautista continued his success in the states by defeating Nicaraguan, Roberto Bonilla by KO in just three rounds. He finished off the successful "road-trip" by defeating Brazilian, Giovanni Andrade, after Andrade retired from the bout after 4 rounds of action.

After one fight in the Philippines (where he defeated Mexican, Marino Montiel for the then vacant WBO Inter-Continental and Asia Pacific Youth super bantamweight titles), Bautista fought in The World Awaits undercard, when his promoter at the time, Oscar De La Hoya of Golden Boy Promotions, allowed Bautista to fight in the undercard of his bout against Floyd Mayweather. This was a big step in Bautista's career, since the fight was titled as a WBO Super Bantamweight Title Eliminator.

On May 5, 2007, in the MGM Grand Garden Arena in Las Vegas, Nevada, Bautista faced and defeated the then undefeated Argentine contender Sergio Manuel Medina (28–0) by UD. Bautista, although defeating Medina, too suffered a knockdown. On the eleventh round, "Medina clearly staggered Bautista with a solid combination and the Filipino held on to the ropes to apparently keep himself from going down". But nonetheless, "in the end, it was the unabated aggression of Bautista which accounted for the big margins on the scorecards of the judges, as he connected with several solid combinations to win most of the close rounds (of the bout)". The win gives Bautista his first world title shot, against the then WBO Super Bantamweight World Champion, Daniel Ponce de León of Mexico.

==== First and second career loss ====
On August 11, 2007, in ARCO Arena in Sacramento, California, Bautista headlined the boxing World Cup staged by Golden Boy Promotions: Philippines vs. Mexico. Bautista, to the disappointment of the many Filipino fans in attendance that night, failed in his first attempt at a world title, when he suffered a first-round TKO loss to the hands of Daniel Ponce de León, suffering his first ever loss as a pro. The Mexican proved to be too strong, knocking down Bautista twice in the first round, forcing the referee to stop the bout.

On November 22, 2008, after administering three more wins to build his confidence following his first-round knockout loss to Ponce de León, Bautista was vanquished by Heriberto Ruiz of Mexico, who had a record of (39–7–2) coming into the bout. Bautista lost by scores of 80–70, 78-72 and 77–73, all in favor of the Mexican.

=== Featherweight ===
Bautista and his handlers decided to move up one weight division, up to featherweight,. On October 16, 2009, Bautista made his long-awaited ring return. There, he took on respected Marangin Marbun of Indonesia, whom he defeated by a seventh-round TKO, awarding Bautista the then vacant interim WBC International Featherweight title, which he relinquished on January 19, 2010.

Bautista fought Thailand's Saichon Sotornpitak for a 10-round non titled fight on April 24, 2010, in Dubai. The bout headlined the card "Philippines vs The Rest of the World, which is presented by KO Promotions in association with ALA Promotions. In this event, two other Filipino boxers, Milan Melindo and Larry Canillas, won their respective bout. Bautista stopped Sotornpitak in the sixth round and improved his record to 28–2, with 21 knockouts. On August 28, 2010, Bautista fought Mexico's Alejandro Barrera (cousin of Marco Antonio Barrera) at the Waterfront Cebu City Hotel in Cebu. The Filipino pugilist won the match by TKO in the 4th round, after the referee stopped the fight due to a bad cut over Barrera's left eye, caused by a punch.

On January 29, 2011, the Filipino boxer knocked out Barrera in the third round of their rematch, which took place at the Cebu City Waterfront Hotel & Casino in Cebu, Philippines.

==== Ruiz-Bautista Rematch ====
June 12, 2011, after suffering a loss in 2008, Bautista defeated Ruiz by Technical decision.

Rey 'Boom Boom' Bautista suffered three cuts due to head butts before the fight was stopped at 0:56 of the seventh round. Heriberto 'Cuate' Ruiz of Mexico effectively defused Bautista's aggressiveness with timely clinches, an effective jab and lateral movement in the early rounds.

Just like in their first fight, Bautista was cut by a clash of heads in the third at the corner of his right eyebrow. Bautista continued to charge forward which resulted in heated exchanges. In the fifth, Ruiz' survival skills showed as he landed a low blow and effectively clinched. Another headbutt opened a cut on Bautista's scalp. Referee Danrex Tapdasan had a hard time controlling the extra-curricular activities.

Bautista was surging and landed the cleaner and harder blows in the 5th and 6th rounds. Ruiz was fading but another clash of heads opened a cut on Bautista's right eyebrow. The ring physician, Dr. Jose Unabia, recommended the fight stoppage. The scores read – Judge Bruce McTavish 69–65, Judge Muhamad Rois 68-65 and Judge Rey Danseco 68-65 all for Bautista.

Bautista won the IBF International featherweight title but a section of the crowd voiced their displeasure. The sportswriters at ringside also had an animated discussion about the outcome.

Per IBF rules, no points were deducted due to the headbutts.

==== WBO International featherweight title ====
On October 20 Bautista won against Daniel Ruiz for the vacant WBO International featherweight title via split decision. The fight took place at the Mall of Asia Arena and was headlined by Bautista's ALA teammate AJ Banal.

== Retirement ==
Bautista attempted to defend the WBO International featherweight championship against José Ramírez on April 20, 2013, but lost by split decision. Moments after the bout, he announced his retirement, but he returned for 2 more fights during 2014.

== Post-boxing ==
Several days after his retirement, Bautista applied to become a boxing trainer for newcomers in the Philippine Air Force.

== Professional boxing record ==
39 fights	36 wins	3 losses
By knockout	11	1
By decision	25	2

No.	Result	Record	Opponent	Type	Round, time	Date	Location	Notes
39	Win	36-3-0	(Mexico) Juan José Martínez	TD	7 (10)	5 Sep 2014	Dubai World Trade Centre, Dubai, United Arab Emirates	Majority TD: Fight was stopped on the 7th round due to a severe cut on the left eyelid of Bautista
38	Win	35-3-0	(Mexico) Sergio Villanueva	UD	10	10 May 2014	Mall of Asia Arena, Pasay, Metro Manila, Philippines	
37	Loss	34-3-0	(Mexico) José Ramírez	SD	12	20 Apr 2013	University of Southeastern Philippines, Davao City, Philippines	Lost WBO International featherweight title
36	Win	34-2-0	(Mexico) Daniel Ruiz	SD	12	20 Oct 2012	Mall of Asia Arena, Pasay, Metro Manila, Philippines	Won vacant WBO International featherweight title
35	Win	33-2	(Mexico) Genaro García	KO	2 (12), 1:24	4 Mar 2012	Carlos P. Garcia Sports Complex, Tagbilaran City, Bohol, Philippines	
34	Win	32-2	(Mexico) Miguel Angel Mendoza	KO	6 (12), 1:20	10 Dec 2011	Hoops Dome, Lapu-Lapu City, Cebu, Philippines	Retained IBF International featherweight title
33	Win	31-2	(Mexico) Heriberto Ruiz	TD	7 (12), 0:56	11 Jun 2011	Waterfront Cebu City Hotel & Casino, Cebu City, Philippines	Won vacant IBF International featherweight title; Unanimous TD: Fight stopped due to a cut on Bautista's right eyebrow produced from an accidental headbutt in Round 7
32	Win	30-2	(Mexico) Alejandro Barrera	KO	3 (10), 2:56	29 Jan 2011	Waterfront Cebu City Hotel & Casino, Cebu City, Philippines	
31	Win	29-2	(Mexico) Alejandro Barrera	TKO	4 (10), 1:14	28 Aug 2010	Waterfront Cebu City Hotel & Casino, Cebu City, Philippines	
30	Win	28-2	(Thailand) Saichon Sotornpitak	KO	6 (10), 1:59	23 Apr 2010	The Lounge, Chi Garden, Dubai, United Arab Emirates	
29	Win	27-2	(Indonesia) Marangin Marbun	TKO	7 (12), 1:25	16 Oct 2009	Waterfront Cebu City Hotel & Casino, Cebu City, Philippines	
28	Loss	26-2	(Mexico) Heriberto Ruiz	UD	8	22 Nov 2008	(United States) MGM Grand Garden Arena, Las Vegas, U.S.	
27	Win	26-1	(Mexico) Eden Marquez	TKO	2 (12), 1:08	30 Aug 2008	Waterfront Cebu City Hotel & Casino, Cebu City, Philippines	Retained WBO Inter-Continental junior-featherweight title
26	Win	25-1-0	(Mexico) Genaro Camargo	KO	2 (12), 0:57	6 Apr 2008	Araneta Coliseum, Quezon City, Metro Manila, Philippines	Retained WBO Inter-Continental junior-featherweight title
25	Win	24-1	(Mexico) Antonio Meza	UD	12	2 Dec 2007	Araneta Coliseum, Quezon City, Metro Manila, Philippines	Won vacant WBO Inter-Continental junior-featherweight title
24	Loss	23-1	(Mexico) Daniel Ponce de León	TKO	1 (12), 2:30	11 Aug 2007	(United States) ARCO Arena, Sacramento, California, U.S.	For WBO junior-featherweight title
23	Win	23-0	(Argentina) Sergio Manuel Medina	UD	12	5 May 2007	(United States) MGM Grand Garden Arena, Las Vegas, U.S.	
22	Win	22-0	(Mexico) Marino Montiel	KO	3 (10), 1:07	24 Feb 2007	Cebu City Sports Complex, Cebu City, Philippines	Won vacant WBO Inter-Continental and WBO Asia Pacific Youth junior-featherweight titles
21	Win	21-0	(Brazil) Giovanni Andrade	RTD	4 (10), 0:01	2 Dec 2006	(United States) St. Pete Times Forum, Tampa, Florida, U.S.	
20	Win	20-0	(Nicaragua) Roberto Bonilla	KO	3 (10), 2:36	20 May 2006	(United States) Staples Center, Los Angeles, U.S.	
19	Win	19-0	(Mexico) Gerardo Espinoza	UD	8	23 Dec 2005	(United States) Sycuan Resort & Casino, El Cajon, California, U.S.	
18	Win	18-0	(Tanzania) Obote Ameme	TKO	2 (12), 1:57	19 Nov 2005	Carlos P. Garcia Sports Complex, Tagbilaran City, Bohol, Philippines	Retained WBO Asia Pacific bantamweight title
17	Win	17-0	(Colombia) Felix Flores	KO	3 (8), 1:12	10 Sep 2005	(United States) Staples Center, Los Angeles, U.S.	
16	Win	16-0	(Mexico) Gilberto Bolanos	RTD	5 (10), 3:00	11 Jun 2005	Mandaue City Sports and Cultural Complex, Mandaue City, Cebu, Philippines	
15	Win	15-0	(Thailand) Aree Phosuwangym	TKO	5 (10), 1:45	11 Mar 2005	(United States) Blaisdell Center, Honolulu, Hawaii, U.S.	
14	Win	14-0	(South Africa) Vuyisile Bebe	UD	12	29 Jan 2005	Mandaue City Sports and Cultural Complex, Mandaue City, Cebu, Philippines	Retained WBO Asia Pacific bantamweight title
13	Win	13-0	(Indonesia) Christian Casino	UD	1 (10), 2:58	24 Oct 2004	Bohol Wisdom School Gym, Tagbilaran City, Bohol, Philippines	Retained WBO Asia Pacific bantamweight title
12	Win	12-0	(Thailand) Saensak Singmanasak	KO	2 (12), 1:43	17 Aug 2004	Mandaue City Sports and Cultural Complex, Mandaue City, Cebu, Philippines	Won vacant WBO Asia Pacific bantamweight title
11	Win	11-0	(Japan) Hirokatsu Yamazaki	RTD	3 (10), 3:00	27 Jun 2004	Sangyo Shinko Center, Akashi, Hyōgo, Japan	
10	Win	10-0	(South Korea) Kim Hwi-Jong	SD	10	29 May 2004	Kyongmin University Gym, Uijeongbu City, South Korea	
9	Win	9-0	(Indonesia) Hengky Wuwungan	TKO	3 (10), 1:00	20 Apr 2004	RCTI Studio, Jakarta, Indonesia	
8	Win	8-0	(Philippines) Albert Cesa	TKO	2 (10), 2:27	4 Apr 2004	Mandaue City Sports and Cultural Complex, Mandaue City, Cebu, Philippines	
7	Win	7-0	(Philippines) Rommel Libradilla	TKO	2 (10), 1:10	28 Feb 2004	Mandaue City Sports and Cultural Complex, Mandaue City, Cebu, Philippines	
6	Win	6-0	(Philippines) Rodel Orais	UD	10	8 Jan 2004	Gaisano Country Mall Parking Lot, Cebu City, Philippines	
5	Win	5-0	(Philippines) Jun Pader	TKO	3 (10)	27 Dec 2003	Danao Sports Complex, Danao, Cebu, Philippines	
4	Win	4-0	(Philippines) Ricky Escaner	TKO	3 (10)	12 Oct 2003	Guindulman, Bohol, Philippines	
3	Win	3-0	(Philippines) Rey Martizano	TKO	4 (8)	30 Aug 2003	Gaisano Country Mall Parking Lot, Cebu City, Philippines	
2	Win	2-0	(Philippines) Jerry Manganip	TKO	3 (6)	26 Jul 2003	Mandaue City Sports and Cultural Complex, Mandaue City, Cebu, Philippines	
1	Win	1-0	(Philippines) Noel Acasio	UD	6	12 Jun 2003	Gaisano Country Mall Parking Lot, Cebu City, Philippines	

Achievements
Vacant	WBO International Featherweight Champion; October 20, 2012 – present	Incumbent
