= Carlos Pérez Suárez =

Mexican boxer (born 1994)

Personal information
- Nickname: Tornado
- Born: 14 July 1994 (age 32) Guadalajara, Jalisco, Mexico
- Height: 1.81 m (5 ft 11 in)
- Weight: Light welterweight

Boxing career
- Reach: 185 cm (73 in)
- Stance: Orthodox

Boxing record
- Total fights: 5
- Wins: 4
- Win by KO: 3
- Losses: 1
- Draws: 0
- No contests: 0

Carlos Pérez Suárez (born 14 July 1994) is a Mexican former professional boxer who competed from 2010 to 2013. He was promoted by Saúl Álvarez' company Canelo Promotions.

== Amateur career ==
During his amateur career he had seventeen fights, going 16–1.

== Professional career ==
In December 2010, Pérez beat the veteran Ivan Rodriguez at the Arena Jalisco in Guadalajara.

In his next fight Carlos lost against the veteran Cesar Figueroa on the Canelo Álvarez vs. Ryan Rhodes undercard.
