= Don Pastor =

Filipino-American racing driver (born 1985)

- Nationality: Filipino
- Born: 16 December 1985 (age 40) East Los Angeles, California, U.S.
- Relatives: Enzo Pastor (brother; deceased)

NASCAR Whelen Euroseries career
- Debut season: 2013
- Car number: 92
- Former teams: Formula 3 Team Toms's and Formula BMW Asia Scholar
- Wins: 2
- Poles: 21
- Best finish: 13th in 2013

Awards
- 2010 Driver Of the Year

Don Pastor (born 16 December 1985) is a Filipino-American racing driver. He was the first Filipino-American to participate in the NASCAR Whelen Euroseries race circuit. He was named Philippine Driver of the Year in 2010 and has won the 2012 Global Time Attack race held in Buttonwillow, California. Don Pastor was also dubbed as the "Don of Racing".
