= Enzo Pastor =

Filipino racing driver

- Nationality: Filipino
- Born: Ferdinand Salas Pastor, Jr. 24 January 1982 Manila, Philippines
- Died: 12 June 2014 (aged 32) Quezon City, Philippines
- Relatives: Don Pastor

NASCAR Whelen Euroseries Open Championship career
- Debut season: 2013
- Current team: TFT-Alpes Carrelage
- Car number: 3
- Fastest laps: 1
- Best finish: 6th in 2013

Previous series
- Asian Formula Three Championship

Ferdinand "Enzo" Salas Pastor, Jr. (January 24, 1982 – June 12, 2014) was a Filipino racing driver. Pastor made his racing debut at the 1999 Toyota Corolla Cup with a Toyota Corolla as his first vehicle. Pastor was the first Filipino to have participated in the NASCAR Whelen Euroseries Open Championship race circuit. Pastor landed on sixth place overall for his first Euroseries Open Championship in 2013 and made one of the fastest laps in the series. Pastor was invited to participate in the K&N Pro Series East.

== Death ==
On June 12, 2014, Pastor died from gunshot wounds after motorcycle-riding gunmen ambushed the truck he rode on in Quezon City, which left his assistant, Paolo Salazar, injured. Pastor was travelling to Clark, Pampanga, in preparation for the final leg of the 2014 Asian V8 Championship Series season.

The Police arrested the suspected mastermind behind the death of Enzo Pastor. Businessman Domingo de Guzman III was arrested on August 26, 2014 in Muntinlupa and was taken into custody at Camp Karingal. Earlier on August 23, suspect and policeman Edgar Angel was arrested and admitted that he was hired by de Guzman to kill Pastor.

"Love triangle" is being viewed as a possible motive for the killing. De Guzman allegedly had relations with Enzo Pastor's wife, Dalia Guerrero Pastor. Enzo Pastor's widow was also tagged as a suspect by the police. In 2024, the Supreme Court upheld the finding of probable Cause and revived the arrest warrant against Dahlia. (Note: Decision in G.R. Nos. 255100, 255229, and 255503, (De Guzman v. People; Pastor v. Pastor; People v. Pastor and De Guzman), February 26, 2024.) Dalia remains at large as of 2024, with Pastor's parents Tom and Remy believing she has left the Philippines since 2015.

== Complete motorsports results ==
=== NASCAR ===
(key) (Bold – Pole position awarded by qualifying time. Italics – Pole position earned by points standings or practice time. * – Most laps led.)

==== Whelen Euro Series - Elite 2 ====
NASCAR Whelen Euro Series - Elite 2 results
Year	Team	No.	Make	1	2	3	4	5	6	7	8	9	10	11	12	NWES	Pts
2012	Pole Position 81	81	Dodge	NOG	NOG	BRH; 20	BRH; 13	SPA	SPA	TOU	TOU	VAL	VAL	BUG	BUG	29th	58
2013	TFT Racing	3	Chevy	NOG; 7	NOG; 4	DIJ; 20	DIJ; 15	BRH; 5	BRH; 5	TOU; 21	TOU; 18	MNZ; 6	MNZ; 6	BUG; 10	BUG; 6	6th	563

== See also ==
- Don Pastor - Enzo's brother, also a race car driver.
