= A. J. Banal =

Filipino boxer

AJ Banal
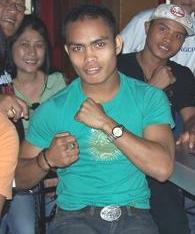

Personal information
- Nicknames: Bazooka, AJ
- Nationality: (Philippines) Filipino
- Born: Alex John Banal; December 28, 1988 (age 37) Bukidnon, Philippines
- Height: 5 ft 4 in (1.63 m)
- Weight: Super Bantamweight; Bantamweight; Super Flyweight

Boxing career
- Stance: Southpaw

Boxing record
- Total fights: 38
- Wins: 35
- Win by KO: 23
- Losses: 2
- Draws: 1

Alex John Banal (born December 28, 1988), more commonly known as A. J. “Bazooka” Banal, is a Filipino professional boxer. Banal resides in Ermita, Cebu City, Cebu, where he trains in the city's famed ALA Boxing Gym.

== Early life ==
Banal's interest in boxing began through the inspiration of his uncle, Roselito Campaña, who was also a boxer for the ALA Boxing Gym. At the age of three, Banal joined the ALA team as an amateur, and has been with the organization ever since.

== Professional career ==
=== Super flyweight ===
Banal, aspiring to succeed in the sport, turned pro during the year of 2005. His first opponent being unheralded Sonny Saguing. The bout ended with a technical draw, with Banal suffering a big cut on his eyebrow due to an unintentional headbutt. Banal was very disappointed in the outcome of the fight, and aspired to keep his then undefeated record intact.

Banal underwent a huge change in competition in only his second year as a pro. He faced tougher opposition, compared to the fighters he previously faced at the time, fighting prospects, who like him, were undefeated. Banal had a record of 7–0–1 when he faced undefeated Indonesian prospect Ali Rochmad (13–0), whom Banal easily defeated with a 5th-round knockout (KO). Two months later, he faced undefeated Thai prospect Janesuk King Sports (11–0), who retired from the bout after the sixth round. And just a month after fighting the then undefeated Thai, Banal fought and defeated highly rated Indonesian contender, Angky Angkota, who sported a record of 17–3 before he lost to Banal by unanimous decision (UD).

==== Super flyweight contention ====
After winning his next five fights, including his U.S. debut, Banal then had a chance to collect his first regional belt, facing Esau Gaona of Mexico. Banal easily defeated the Mexican, winning the bout with a first-round KO with a powerful straight to the jaw, winning the then vacant WBO Asia Pacific Youth super flyweight title. He then defended his title for the first and last time against Mexican Jovanny Soto, whom he defeated with a ninth-round technical knockout.

After the Soto bout, Banal had an opportunity to fight for the mandatory contender spot in an IBF super flyweight title eliminator. On April 6, 2008, in Quezon City, Philippines, Banal fought the then undefeated Caril Herrera of Uruguay (21–0) for this challenge. Banal, not to disappoint, defeated the then undefeated fighter with a fourth-round TKO, earning a shot at the IBF super flyweight title.

==== First career loss ====
Although he won a chance for the IBF title, Banal turned down the opportunity in order to fight under another sanctioning body. On July 26, 2008, in the Cebu Coliseum in Cebu City, Banal fought for the interim WBA super flyweight title. Despite leading in all three judges' scorecards, he lost by knockout to Panama's Rafael Concepción. Banal took a right hand to the temple region in Round 10 from Concepción, after being knocked down, he then took a knee throughout the referee's count, marking his first ever defeat in his professional career.

== Bantamweight ==
Following his knockout loss to Concepción, Banal moved up one weight class, to the bantamweight division. On January 31, 2009, in Banal's bantamweight debut, he faced Indonesian Nouldy Manakane, whom he defeated by knockout in just four rounds of action. He then faced Tanzanian Mbwana Matumla, four months later, who he defeated in just two rounds. Following his two knockout wins over Manakane and Matumla, he faced rugged Mexican Jose Angel Beranza in the undercard of Brian Viloria's first title defense of his newly won IBF light flyweight title, in Honolulu, Hawaii. Banal was unable to knockout the always forwarding Mexican, but was able to prevail by UD, with scores of 99–92, 98–92, and 99–91, all in favor of AJ "Bazooka" Banal.

On January 14, 2010, Banal defeated a former 4-time world title challenger in Cecilio Santos of Mexico. Banal, cheered by his hometown fans in Cebu, was hesitant to begin the fight. But in the following two rounds, Banal began to hit his mark. And finally, in the 4th round of the bout, Banal was able to land his dangerous left hook to the temple, followed up with his trademark aggression, eventually sending Santos to the canvas. The Mexican, with all his might just couldn't continue, and was eventually counted out in the 35-second mark of the 4th round, further pushing Banal to hopefully another world title fight.

Banal fought Japan's Big Yoo (16–2; 11 KO) on July 17, 2010, at the Carlos P. Garcia Stadium, Tagbilaran City, Bohol. The Filipino fighter won the bout by KO in the 5th round.

On October 31, 2010, Banal won by disqualification against the veteran Luis Alberto Perez. Banal won the first 6 rounds of the fight until round 7, the veteran Perez came back and give heavy blows that staggers Banal. After the referee break them Perez clinch a punch on Banal and made Banal unable to continue. Banal won by DQ.

=== World title shot ===
On October 21 Banal lost to Thailand's Pungluang Sor Singyu with the latter taking the vacant WBO bantamweight title, with a ninth-round TKO. The fight took place at the Mall of Asia Arena.

== Professional boxing record ==
39 fights	36 wins	2 losses
By knockout	23	2
By decision	13	0
Draws	1	

No.	Result	Record	Opponent	Type	Round, time	Date	Location	Notes
39	Win	36–2–1	(Indonesia) Master Suro	UD	10	2018-05-13	SM City North EDSA Skydome, Quezon City, Metro Manila, Philippines	
38	Win	35–2–1	(Philippines) Jason Egera	SD	6	2017-12-16	(Philippines) Makati Central Square Boxing Arena, Makati, Metro Manila	
37	Win	34–2–1	(Tanzania) Emilio Norfat	TKO	3 (10), 1:41	2015-11-28	Hoops Dome, Lapu-Lapu City, Cebu, Philippines	
36	Win	33–2–1	(Indonesia) Junior Bajawa	UD	8	2015-11-28	Araneta Coliseum, Quezon City, Metro Manila, Philippines	
35	Win	32–2–1	(Thailand) Maxsaisai Sithsaithong	UD	10	2014-11-15	Waterfront Cebu City Hotel & Casino, Cebu City, Cebu, Philippines	
34	Win	31-2-1	(Indonesia) Defry Palulu	KO	2 (10), 2:59	2014-06-21	Cebu City Waterfront Hotel & Casino, Lahug, Cebu City, Cebu, Philippines	
33	Win	30-2-1	(Dominican Republic) Manuel Gonzalez Garcia	UD	10	2013-11-30	Araneta Coliseum, Cubao, Quezon City, Metro Manila, Philippines	
32	Win	29-2-1	(Mexico) Abraham Gomez	RTD	2 (10), 3:00	2013-07-13	Solaire Resort & Casino, Parañaque, Metro Manila, Philippines	
31	Loss	28-2-1	(Thailand) Pungluang Sor Singyu	TKO	9 (12), 1:45	2012-10-20	SM Mall of Asia Arena, Pasay, Metro Manila, Philippines	For vacant WBO bantamweight title
30	Win	28-1-1	(Indonesia) Ruben Manakane	UD	8	2012-07-21	Dumaguete City Central School Quadrangle, Dumaguete, Philippines	
29	Win	27-1-1	(Mexico) Raul Hidalgo	TKO	1 (12), 2:29	2012-03-24	Cebu City Waterfront Hotel & Casino, Lahug, Cebu City, Cebu, Philippines	
28	Win	26-1-1	(Mexico) Mario Briones	UD	12	2011-10-08	University of St. La Salle Coliseum, Bacolod, Negros Occidental, Philippines	
27	Win	25-1-1	(Canada) Tyson Cave	TD	8 (12), 2:32	2011-07-30	Hoops Dome, Lapu-Lapu City, Cebu, Philippines	
26	Win	24-1-1	(Tanzania) Francis Miyeyusho	KO	2 (12), 2:02	2011-03-19	Cebu City Waterfront Hotel & Casino, Lahug, Cebu City, Cebu, Philippines	
25	Win	23-1-1	(Nicaragua) Luis Alberto Pérez	DQ	7 (10), 1:46	2010-10-30	Cebu City Waterfront Hotel & Casino, Lahug, Cebu City, Cebu, Philippines	
24	Win	22-1-1	(Japan) Hayato Kimura	KO	5 (12), 1:59	2010-07-17	Carlos P. Garcia Football Stadium, Tagbilaran City, Bohol, Philippines	Won vacant WBO Asia Pacific bantamweight title
23	Win	21-1-1	(Mexico) Cecilio Santos	KO	4 (10), 0:35	2010-01-14	Cebu City Waterfront Hotel & Casino, Lahug, Cebu City, Cebu, Philippines	
22	Win	20-1-1	(Mexico) Jose Angel Beranza	UD	10	2009-08-29	(United States) Neal S. Blaisdell Center, Honolulu, Hawaii, U.S.	
21	Win	19-1-1	(Tanzania) Mbwana Matumla	KO	2 (10), 2:23	2009-05-16	Cebu City Coliseum, Cebu City, Cebu, Philippines	
20	Win	18-1-1	(Indonesia) Nouldy Manakane	KO	4 (10), 1:11	2009-01-31	Island City Mall Car Park, Tagbilaran City, Bohol, Philippines	
19	Loss	17-1-1	(Panama) Rafael Concepción	KO	10 (12), 2:35	2008-07-26	Cebu City Coliseum, Cebu City, Cebu, Philippines	For WBA interim super flyweight title
18	Win	17-0-1	(Uruguay) Caril Herrera	KO	4 (12), 1:18	2008-04-06	(Philippines) Araneta Coliseum, Cubao, Quezon City, Metro Manila	
17	Win	16-0-1	(Mexico) Jovanny Soto	TKO	9 (10), 2:15	2007-12-02	Araneta Coliseum, Cubao, Quezon City, Metro Manila, Philippines	
16	Win	15-0-1	(Mexico) Esau Gaona	KO	1 (10), 1:08	2007-01-20	Cebu City Waterfront Hotel & Casino, Lahug, Cebu City, Cebu, Philippines	Won vacant WBO Asia Pacific Youth super flyweight title
15	Win	14-0-1	(Mexico) Jorge Cardenas	TKO	3 (6), 0:28	2007-08-11	(United States) Arco Arena, Sacramento, California	
14	Win	13-0-1	(Mexico) Juan Alberto Rosas	UD	8	2007-05-05	(United States) MGM Grand, Las Vegas, Nevada, U.S.	
13	Win	12-0-1	(Thailand) Komrit Lukkuongmuekol	TKO	1 (8), 2:11	2007-02-24	Cebu City Sports Complex, Cebu City, Cebu, Philippines	
12	Win	11-0-1	(Thailand) Terdkiat Jandaeng	TKO	9 (10), 2:58	2007-01-20	Mandaue City Sports and Cultural Complex, Centro, Mandaue City, Cebu, Philippines	
11	Win	10-0-1	(Indonesia) Angky Angkotta	UD	10	2006-10-21	Mandaue City Sports and Cultural Complex, Centro, Mandaue City, Cebu, Philippines	
10	Win	9-0-1	(Thailand) Tabthong Tor Buamas	RTD	6 (10), 3:00	2006-09-23	Island City Mall Car Park, Tagbilaran City, Bohol, Philippines	
9	Win	8-0-1	(Indonesia) Ali Rochmad	KO	5 (10), 1:35	2006-07-22	Island City Mall Car Park, Tagbilaran City, Bohol, Philippines	
8	Win	7-0-1	(Philippines) Jun Pader	TKO	4 (8), 2:56	2006-07-03	Island City Mall Car Park, Tagbilaran City, Bohol, Philippines	
7	Win	6-0-1	(Thailand) Bangsaen Sithpraprom	KO	2(8), 2:15	2006-04-30	Island City Mall Car Park, Tagbilaran City, Bohol, Philippines	
6	Win	5-0-1	(Thailand) Dechapol Kokietgym	KO	1 (6)	2006-03-18	Mandaue City Sports and Cultural Complex, Centro, Mandaue City, Cebu, Philippines	
5	Win	4-0-1	(Philippines) John Clifford Ranan	TKO	3 (6)	2006-02-19	Loon Cultural and Sports Center, Loon, Bohol, Philippines	
4	Win	3-0-1	(Philippines) Rodel Veronque	TKO	5 (6)	2006-01-15	Gaisano Country Mall Parking Lot, Banilad, Cebu City, Cebu, Philippines	
3	Win	2-0-1	(Philippines) Rodel Veronque	UD	4	2005-11-19	Carlos P. Garcia Sports Complex, Tagbilaran City, Bohol, Philippines	
2	Win	1-0-1	(Philippines) Julius Cabusas	KO	1 (4)	2005-09-17	Mandaue City Sports and Cultural Complex, Centro, Mandaue City, Cebu, Philippines	
1	Draw	0-0-1	(Philippines) Sonny Saguing	TD	2 (4)	2005-06-11	Mandaue City Sports and Cultural Complex, Centro, Mandaue City, Cebu, Philippines	
