= Sergio Villanueva (boxer) =

Mexican boxer (born 1991)

Personal information
- Nickname: El Cuate
- Born: Sergio Armando Villanueva Reyes; 19 August 1991 (age 34) Guadalajara, Jalisco, Mexico
- Height: 1.77 m (5 ft 10 in)
- Weight: Featherweight; Super featherweight; Lightweight

Boxing career
- Reach: 183 cm (72 in)
- Stance: Orthodox

Boxing record
- Total fights: 38
- Wins: 28
- Win by KO: 15
- Losses: 8
- Draws: 2

Sergio Armando Villanueva Reyes (born 19 August 1991) is a Mexican professional boxer who held the WBC Youth featherweight title from 2011 to 2012.

== Professional career ==
In December 2010, Sergio beat the veteran Erick Perez, the bout was held at the Estadio Beto Ávila, in Veracruz, Veracruz, Mexico.

On 18 June 2011 Villanueva defeated Colombia's Onalvi Sierra. The bout was for the vacant WBC Youth featherweight title and was held on the undercard of Canelo Álvarez vs. Ryan Rhodes.
