= Waterfront Cebu City Hotel & Casino =

- The casino hotel in 2024
- Interactive map of the Waterfront Cebu City Hotel & Casino area

General information
- Status: Completed
- Type: Hotel and Casino
- Location: Cebu City, Philippines
- Coordinates: 10°19′29″N 123°54′16″E
- Opening: January 11, 1998; 28 years ago
- Owner: Waterfront Cebu City Casino Hotel, Inc.

Technical details
- Floor count: 17 above ground, 8 below ground

Other information
- Number of rooms: 562

Website
- www.waterfronthotels.com.ph

Waterfront Cebu City Hotel & Casino is a four star integrated resort located in Cebu City, Philippines. The hotel has 561 guestrooms. Hotel function rooms include the Pacific Grand Ballroom, with over 2,000 m^{2} floor area, ten function rooms, and two pool gardens.

== History ==
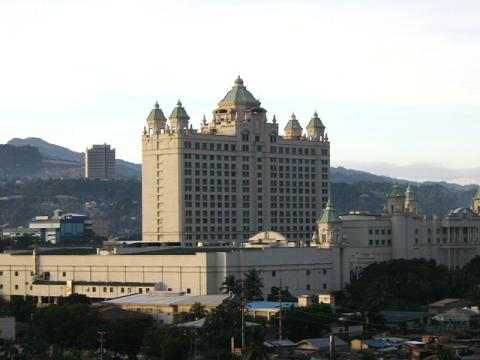
Hotel in 2007

The Waterfront Cebu City Hotel & Casino was opened in 1998, in time for the ASEAN Tourism Forum held within the same year although plans for the hotel date back as early as 1993. The Cebu City hotel is the second establishment opened under the Waterfront Hotel & Casino brand with the first being in Mactan island which opened in 1996.

== Facilities ==
The hotel has a gaming area called Club Waterfront. The Casino Filipino is also in the hotel. It also hosts a 7,000-people capacity Pacific Grand Ballroom, which is the biggest MICE venue in Cebu City.

== Notable events ==
- 2005 – Southeast Asian Games: Dancesport tournament
- 2011 – IBF International Featherweight title match between Rey Bautista and Heriberto Ruiz with Bautista clinching the belt.
- 2012 – Concerts by Engelbert Humperdinck, Brian McKnight, Dan Hill, Jimi Jamison, and Rex Smith
- 2024 – Visayas leg of the Biniverse concert tour by the Pinoy pop group Bini.

== See also ==
- List of integrated resorts
