= List of male boxers =

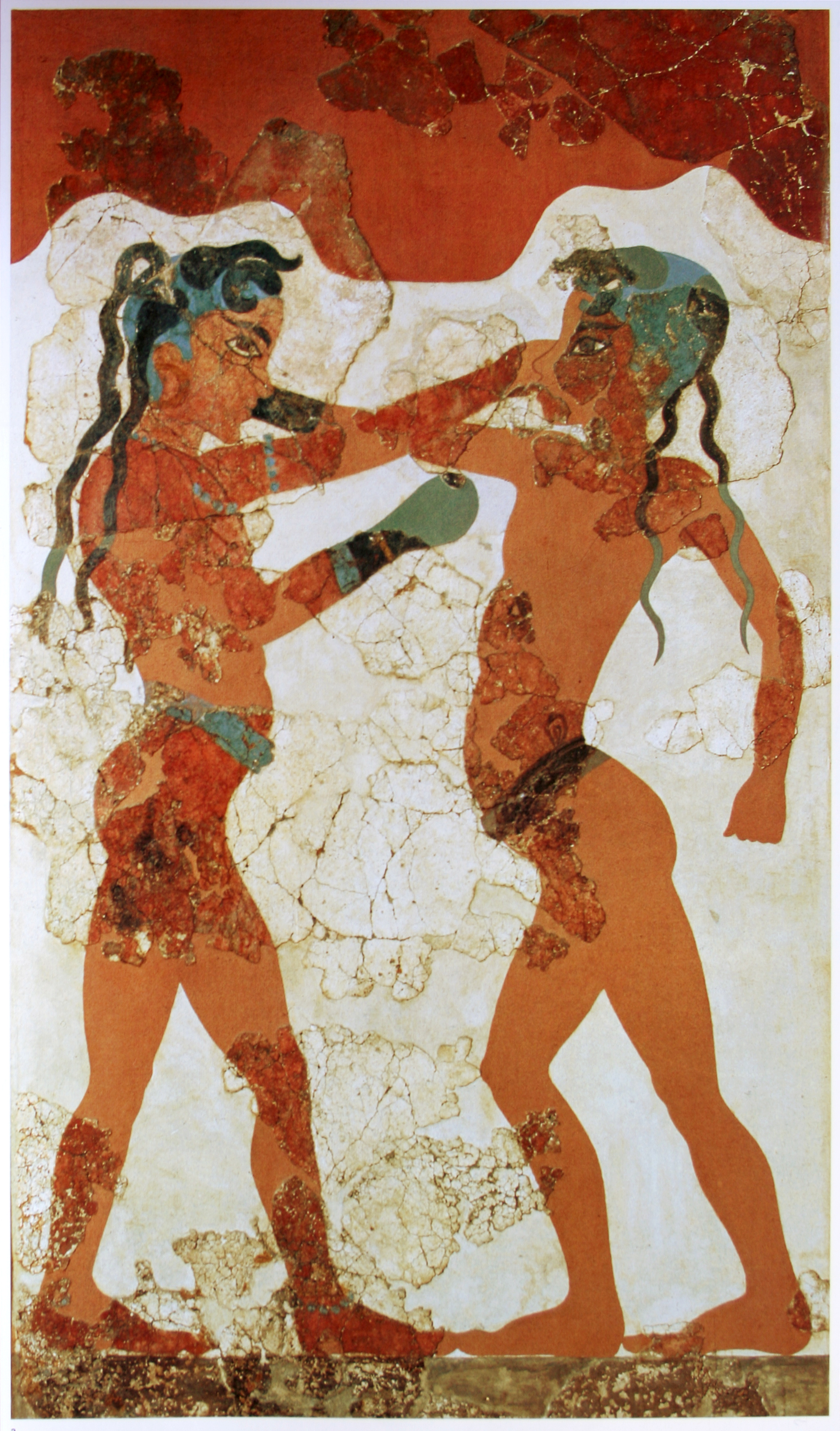
Young boxers fresco, Akrotiri, Greece. This fresco depicts two naken children wearing a belt and boxing gloves. Their head is shaved, excepted two long locks on the back, and two shorter on the forehead. Their dark skin indicates their gender. The boy at left is more reserved, and wears jewelry (bracelets, necklace) which indicates a high social status.

This is a list of notable male boxers. For a list of female boxers, see List of female boxers.

== A ==
- William Abelyan
- Arthur Abraham
- Miguel Acosta
- Tomasz Adamek
- Ola Afolabi
- Joachim Alcine
- Devon Alexander
- José Alfaro
- Muhammad Ali
- Mike Alvarado
- Canelo Álvarez
- Elvis Álvarez
- Saúl Álvarez
- Lou Ambers
- Ricky Anderson
- Sammy Angott
- Alfredo Angulo
- Vito Antuofermo
- Fred Apostoli
- George Araujo
- Jorge Arce
- Alexis Argüello
- Henry Armstrong
- Mike Arnaoutis
- Chris Arreola
- Lenin Arroyo
- Alex Arthur
- Amin Asikainen
- Abe Attell
- Emanuel Augustus
- Ray Austin
- Bonifacio Ávila
- Alexander Awdijan
- Selcuk Aydin

== B ==
- Billy Backus
- Tony Badea
- Buddy Baer
- Max Baer
- Bob Baker
- Joe Baksi
- Carlos Balderas
- Carlos Baldomir
- Gary Balletto
- Tony Baltazar
- Marco Antonio Barrera
- Miguel Barrera
- Monte Barrett
- Yan Bartelemí
- Carmen Basilio
- Brian Battease
- Roberto Benitez
- Wilfred Benítez
- Nigel Benn
- Roger Bernard
- Robert Berridge
- Andre Berto
- Markus Beyer
- Riddick Bowe
- Timothy Bradley
- Adam Braidwood
- Livingstone Bramble
- Lamon Brewster
- Shannon Briggs
- Kell Brook
- Lucas Browne
- Frank Bruno
- Jackie Burke
- Lucian Bute
- Chris Byrd

== C ==
- Danilo Cabrera
- Ivan Calderón
- John Caldwell
- Victor Luvi Callejas
- Joe Calzaghe
- Myke Carvalho
- Julio César Chávez
- Billy Collins Jr.
- Robson Conceição
- James J. Corbett
- Terence Crawford

== D ==
- Denton Daley
- Domingo Damigella
- Vic Darchinyan
- Dary Dasuda
- Alberto Davila
- Gervonta Davis
- Jackie Davis
- Chad Dawson
- Daniel Dawson
- Esteban De Jesús
- Oscar De La Hoya
- Carlos De León
- James DeGale
- Tony DeMarco
- Jack Dempsey
- Jack "Nonpareil" Dempsey
- Adrian Diaconu
- Kid Diamond
- David Díaz
- Juan Díaz
- Nate Diaz
- Nick Diaz
- Andre Dirrell
- George Dixon
- Mircea Dobrescu
- David Dolan
- Nonito Donaire
- Leonard Doroftei
- Stipe Drviš
- Harry Dublinsky
- John Duddy
- Bernard Dunne
- Johnny Dundee
- Jack Dupree
- Roberto Durán
- Yvon Durelle

== E ==
- Graham Earl
- Howard Eastman
- Hiroyuki Ebihara
- Joe Egan
- Wayne Elcock
- Jimmy Ellis
- Lester Ellis
- Flash Elorde
- Carlos Eluaiza
- Zsolt Erdei
- Joe Erskine (American boxer)
- Joe Erskine (Welsh boxer)
- Alfredo Escalera
- Eric "Butterbean" Esch
- Sixto Escobar
- Luisito Espinosa
- David Estrada
- Jason Estrada
- Clifford Etienne
- Chris Eubank
- Alfredo Evangelista

== F ==
- Pål Arne Fagernes
- Johnny Famechon
- Anthony Farnell
- Johnny Farr
- Tommy Farr
- Jeff Fenech
- Tye Fields
- James Figg
- Chris Finnegan
- Kevin Finnegan
- Luis Firpo
- Bob Fitzsimmons
- BJ Flores
- Félix Flores
- Zora Folley
- Al Ford
- Ryan Ford
- George Foreman
- Yuri Foreman
- Vernon Forrest
- Ricardo Fortaleza
- Bob Foster
- Jeff Fraza
- Joe Frazier
- Marvis Frazier
- Acelino Freitas
- Arturo Frias
- Carl Froch
- Takeshi Fuji
- Sammy Fuller
- Gene Fullmer
- Fred Fulton
- Ali Funeka
- Hughie Fury
- Tommy Fury
- Tyson Fury

== G ==
- Kaokor Galaxy
- Khaosai Galaxy
- Tony Galento
- Andras Galfi
- Víctor Galíndez
- Esteban Gallard
- Julio Gamboa
- Yuriorkis Gamboa
- Scott Gammer
- Baby Joe Gans
- Joe Gans
- Alejandro García
- Alex Garcia
- Danny García
- Julio César García
- Mikey Garcia
- Robert Garcia
- Roberto García
- Ryan Garcia
- Arturo Gatti
- Kid Gavilán
- Daniel Geale
- Julio Gervacio
- Khoren Gevor
- Christian Giantomassi
- Joey Giardello
- Mike Gibbons
- Tommy Gibbons
- Vyacheslav Glazkov
- Rodney Glunder
- George Godfrey (boxer born 1853)
- George Godfrey (boxer born 1897)
- Matt Godfrey
- Arturo Godoy
- Alfonso Gomez
- Juan Carlos Gomez
- Michael Gomez
- Wilfredo Gómez
- Humberto González
- Roman González
- Z Gorres
- Herol Graham
- Howard Grant
- Rocky Graziano
- Harry Greb
- Allan Green
- Danny Green
- Dave Green
- Mitch Green
- Harold Grey
- Emile Griffith
- Tommy Grogan
- Robert Guerrero
- Dominick Guinn
- Bobby Gunn
- Yoko Gushiken
- Joan Guzmán
- Juan Guzman

== H ==
- Marvin Hagler
- Morrade Hakkar
- Jim Hall
- Matthew Hall
- Tsuyoshi Hamada
- Naseem Hamed
- Mustafa Hamsho
- Devin Haney
- Masahiko Harada
- Vivian Harris
- Audley Harrison
- Scott Harrison
- Marvin Hart
- Hozumi Hasegawa
- Takanori Hatakeyama
- Kiyoshi Hatanaka
- Gene Hatcher
- Matthew Hatton
- Ricky Hatton
- David Haye
- Thomas Hearns
- Tom Heeney
- Robert Helenius
- Pete Herman
- Carlos Hernández
- Yoan Pablo Hernandez
- Richel Hersisia
- Goldie Hess
- Alex Hilton
- Dave Hilton Jr.
- Dave Hilton Sr.
- Matthew Hilton
- Joe Hipp
- Akinobu Hiranaka
- Don Holmes
- Larry Holmes
- Kendall Holt
- Evander Holyfield
- Lloyd Honeyghan
- Bernard Hopkins
- Demetrius Hopkins
- Keitaro Hoshino
- Filip Hrgović
- Marco Huck
- Frankie Hughes

== I ==
- Ike Ibeabuchi
- Sultan Ibragimov
- Timur Ibragimov
- Naoya Inoue
- Hiroki Ioka
- Guts Ishimatsu

== J ==
- Beau Jack
- Rafal Jackiewicz
- Julian Jackson
- Peter Jackson
- Rene Jacquot
- Leen Jansen
- James J. Jeffries
- Lew Jenkins
- Eder Jofre
- Ingemar Johansson
- Chris John
- Martin John
- Harold Johnson
- Jack Johnson
- Kevin Johnson
- Leavander Johnson
- Marvin Johnson
- Roy Jones Jr.
- Anthony Joshua
- Rocky Juarez
- Josiah Judah
- Yoel Judah
- Zab Judah
- Ener Julio
- Joel Julio
- Jorge Eliecer Julio

== K ==
- János Kajdi
- Virgil Kalakoda
- Daiki Kameda
- Kouki Kameda
- Georgi Kandelaki
- Rocky Kansas
- Roman Karmazin
- Michael Katsidis
- Travis Kauffman
- Hiroshi Kawashima
- Katsushige Kawashima
- Ronan Keenan
- Archie Kemp
- Colin Kenna
- Michael Kenny
- Mikkel Kessler
- Stanley Ketchel
- Amir Khan
- Jake Kilrain
- Duk Koo Kim
- Ji-Hoon Kim
- Ji-Won Kim
- Leva Kirakosyan
- Ole Klemetsen
- Vitali Klitschko
- Wladimir Klitschko
- Celes Kobayashi
- Hiroshi Kobayashi
- Royal Kobayashi
- Pawel Kolodziej
- Takashi Koshimoto
- Armand Krajnc
- Luan Krasniqi
- Martin Kristjansen
- Masashi Kudo
- Akhil Kumar
- Eagle Kyowa

== L ==
- Santos Laciar
- Jeff Lacy
- Ismael Laguna
- Kirkland Laing
- Donny Lalonde
- Jake LaMotta
- Sam Langford
- Daniel Lapin
- Juan Laporte
- Denis Lebedev
- Andy Lee
- Jesse James Leija
- Benny Leonard
- Sugar Ray Leonard
- Lennox Lewis
- Sergei Liakhovich
- Rafael Limón
- Jorge Linares
- Moos Linneman
- Sonny Liston
- Little Dado
- Nicolino Locche
- Duilio Loi
- Vasyl Lomachenko
- Danny Lopez
- Ricardo Lopez
- Joe Louis
- Tommy Lowne
- Sammy Luftspring
- Jorge Luján
- Ron Lyle
- Benny Lynch

== M ==
- Kaizer Mabuza
- Enzo Maccarinelli
- Charlie Magri
- Marcos Rene Maidana
- Edwin Malave
- Paul Malignaggi
- Jakob Malz
- Saoul Mamby
- Lenny Mancini
- Ray Mancini
- Al Manfredo
- Peter Manfredo
- Rocky Marciano
- Antonio Margarito
- Juan Manuel Márquez
- Rafael Márquez
- Lloyd Marshall
- Bob Martin
- Sergio Martínez
- Vanes Martirosyan
- Oleg Maskaev
- Henry Maske
- Carlos Maussa
- Joey Maxim
- Andrew Maynard
- Ricardo Mayorga
- Floyd Mayweather Jr.
- Floyd Mayweather Sr.
- Jeff Mayweather
- Roger Mayweather
- Alessandro Mazzinghi
- Samuel Mbugua
- Jock McAvoy
- Kevin McBride
- Gerald McClellan
- Paul McCloskey
- Wayne McCullough
- Glenn McCrory
- John McDermott
- Thomas McDonagh
- Terry McGovern
- Barry McGuigan
- Victor McLaglen
- Jimmy McLarnin
- Lenny McLean
- Peter McNeeley
- Mike McTigue
- Sam McVea
- Kali Meehan
- Carlos Melo
- Boyd Melson
- Daniel Mendoza
- Jean-Paul Mendy
- Alberto Mercado
- Ray Mercer
- Gus Mercurio
- Joe Mesi
- Dariusz Michalczewski
- Tadashi Mihara
- Karel Miljon
- Ray Miller
- Freddie Mills
- Edison Miranda
- Brian Mitchell
- Byron Mitchell
- Kevin Mitchell
- Seth Mitchell
- Sharmba Mitchell
- Javier Molina
- Steve Molitor
- John John Molina
- Mahyar Monshipour
- Pedro Montañez
- Bob Montgomery
- Carlos Monzón
- Archie Moore
- Lauren Moore
- Michael Moorer
- Sergio Mora
- Érik Morales
- Carroll Morgan
- Jean-Marc Mormeck
- Kid Moro
- Carlos Morocho Hernández
- Tommy Morrison
- Shane Mosley
- John Mugabi
- Takuya Muguruma
- Anthony Mundine
- Tony Mundine
- Bob Murphy
- John Murray

== N ==
- Shigeo Nakajima
- José Nápoles
- Omar Andrés Narváez
- Charlie Nash
- Nobuo Nashiro
- Rolando Navarrete
- Orzubek Nazarov
- Lovemore N'dou
- Azumah Nelson
- Johnny Nelson
- Yutaka Niida
- Yosuke Nishijima
- Orlin Norris
- Terry Norris
- Ken Norton
- Yoshiaki Numata
- Michael Nunn

== O ==
- David Obregon
- Victor Oganov
- Sean O'Grady
- Masao Ohba
- Sam Olij
- Rubén Olivares
- Bobo Olson
- George Olteanu
- Ajose Olusegun
- László Orbán
- Carlos Ortiz
- Manuel Ortiz
- Victor Ortíz
- Hideyuki Ohashi
- Katsuya Onizuka
- Sven Ottke
- Said Ouali
- Kassim Ouma

== P ==
- Irene Pacheco
- Bobby Pacho
- Bobby Pacquiao
- Manny Pacquiao
- Greg Page
- Rubén Darío Palacios
- Carlos Palomino
- Antonio Paoli
- László Papp
- Giovanni Parisi
- Mate Parlov
- Lorenzo Parra
- Jean Pascal
- Toon Pastor
- Mauricio Pastrana
- Willie Pastrano
- Floyd Patterson
- Jimmy Paul
- Kelly Pavlik
- Vinny Pazienza
- Eusebio Pedroza
- Gerry Peñalosa
- Paul Pender
- Freddie Pendleton
- Willie Pep
- James Pereira
- Luis Alberto Pérez
- Pascual Perez
- Eddie Perkins
- Samuel Peter
- Kostas Petrou
- Lyn Philp
- Francesco Pianeta
- Ellyas Pical
- Lupe Pintor
- Nicky Piper
- Antonio Pitalúa
- Pete Podgorski
- Alexander Povetkin
- Breidis Prescott
- Mario Preskar
- Ruslan Provodnikov
- Aaron Pryor
- Kubrat Pulev

== Q ==
- Dwight Muhammad Qawi
- Bobby Quarry
- Jerry Quarry
- Mike Quarry
- Hennie Quentemeijer
- Carlos Quintana
- Robert Quiroga

== R ==
- Pete Rademacher
- Zahir Raheem
- Hasim Rahman
- Victor Emilio Ramirez
- Sugar Ramos
- Pete Ranzany
- Sam Rapira
- Tony Reed
- Robin Reid
- Luis Resto
- Gil Reyes
- Ryan Rhodes
- Dick Richardson
- Viddal Riley
- Nick Ring
- Cosme Rivera
- Freddie Roach
- Paolo Roberto
- Sugar Ray Robinson
- Graciano Rocchigiani
- Ralf Rocchigiani
- Adilson Rodrigues
- David Rodriguez
- Francisco Rodríguez Jr.
- Luis Manuel Rodríguez
- José Roman
- Danny Romero
- Omar Niño Romero
- Brad Rone
- Matthew Rosa
- Edwin Rosario
- Lionel Rose
- Barney Ross
- Troy Ross
- Mike Rossman
- Gary Russell Jr.
- Leo Rwabwogo

== S ==
- Matthew Saad Muhammad
- Shozo Saijo
- Alessio Sakara
- Takefumi Sakata
- Vicente Saldivar
- Sinan Samil Sam
- Salvador Sánchez
- Corrie Sanders
- Richie Sandoval
- Dave Sands
- Ahmed Santos
- Lee Savold
- Félix Savón
- Tom Sayers
- Max Schmeling
- Billy Schwer
- George Scott
- Al Seeger
- Tonton Semakala
- Viacheslav Senchenko
- Ulderico Sergo
- Samuel Serrano
- Frédéric Serrat
- Archie Sexton
- Sam Sexton
- Jack Sharkey
- Tom Sharkey
- Earnie Shavers
- Morrie Sherman
- Kuniaki Shibata
- Ronnie Shields
- Yoshio Shirai
- Tony Sibson
- Mzukisi Sikali
- Battling Siki
- Anderson Silva
- Lakva Sim
- John Sina
- Matt Skelton
- James Smith
- Verdell Smith
- Jorge Solís
- Julian Solís
- Odlanier Solis
- Rafael Solis
- Ulises Solís
- Søren Søndergaard
- Albert Sosnowski
- Humberto Soto
- Paul Spadafora
- Errol Spence
- Cory Spinks
- Leon Spinks
- Michael Spinks
- Terence Spinks
- Bill Squires
- Adonis Stevenson
- Shakur Stevenson
- Teófilo Stevenson
- Bermane Stiverne
- Bruce Strauss
- Reggie Strickland
- Felix Sturm
- John L. Sullivan
- Chas Symonds

== T ==
- Carlos Takam
- Katsunari Takayama
- Shinji Takehara
- Vittorio Tamagnini
- Carlos Támara
- Johnny Tapia
- Antonio Tarver
- Joichiro Tatsuyoshi
- Arnold Taylor
- Jermain Taylor
- Meldrick Taylor
- Glover Teixeira
- Drake Thadzi
- Marcel Thil
- Nico Thomas
- Pinklon Thomas
- Hasse Thomsén
- Tue Bjørn Thomsen
- Tony Thompson
- Jimmy Thunder
- Keith Thurman
- Dick Tiger
- Hideki Todaka
- Katsuo Tokashiki
- Tadashi Tomori
- James Toney
- David Torosyan
- José Torres
- Ricardo Torres
- Félix Trinidad
- Adam Trupish
- Choi Tseveenpurev
- Kostya Tszyu
- David Tua
- Gene Tunney
- Buddy Turman
- Najai Turpin
- Randy Turpin
- Regilio Tuur
- Mike Tyson

== U ==
- Yasutsune Uehara
- Juan Urango
- Alexander Ustinov
- Oleksandr Usyk
- Paolino Uzcudun

== V ==
- Rodrigo Valdez
- Edwin Valero
- Benny Valger
- Eddie Vallejo
- Nikolai Valuev
- Hein van der Zee
- Bep van Klaveren
- Piet van Klaveren
- Arnold Vanderlyde
- Fitz Vanderpool
- Fernando Vargas
- Martín Vargas
- Samuel Vargas
- Roberto Vásquez
- Francisc Vastag
- Israel Vázquez
- Wilfredo Vázquez
- Percy Vear
- Hector Javier Velazco
- Pancho Villa
- Ben Villaflor
- Brian Viloria
- James Vrij

== W ==
- Koichi Wajima
- Jersey Joe Walcott
- Joe Walcott
- Gordon Wallace
- Mickey Walker
- Travis Walker
- Andre Ward
- Micky Ward
- Rau'shee Warren
- Muhammad Waseem
- Jiro Watanabe
- Maurice Watkins
- Michael Watson
- Jim Watt
- Chuck Wepner
- Ray Wheatley
- Pernell Whitaker
- Deontay Wilder
- Jess Willard
- Aaron Williams
- Danny Williams
- Holman Williams
- Ike Williams
- Jeremy Williams
- Paul Williams
- Harry Wills
- Krzysztof Wlodarczyk
- Paea Wolfgramm
- Pongsaklek Wonjongkam
- Bruce Woodcock
- Curtis Woodhouse
- Lee Woodley
- Chuck Woods
- Clinton Woods
- Henry Woods
- Chalky Wright
- Winky Wright

== Y ==
- Yasuei Yakushiji
- Anthony Yarde
- Teddy Yarosz
- Tony Yoka
- Jimmy Young

== Z ==
- Tony Zale
- Alfonso Zamora
- Ysaias Zamudio
- Daniel Zaragoza
- Carlos Zarate
- Dejan Zavec
- Tom Zbikowski
- Fritzie Zivic
- Stefano Zoff
- Henriques Zowa
- Fulgencio Zúñiga

== See also ==
- List of female boxers
