= Félix Machado =

Venezuelan boxer (born 1972)

Personal information
- Nationality: (Venezuela) Venezuelan
- Born: Félix Machado; August 22, 1972 (age 54) Guyana
- Height: 5 ft 7 in (1.70 m)
- Weight: Featherweight

Boxing career
- Reach: 69 in (180 cm)
- Stance: Southpaw

Boxing record
- Total fights: 47
- Wins: 26
- Win by KO: 12
- Losses: 20
- Draws: 1
- No contests: 0

Félix Machado (born August 22, 1972 in Guyana) is a Venezuelan featherweight boxer. He currently resides in Bolívar, Venezuela.

He is a former IBF super flyweight champion, defeating Julio Gamboa on July 22, 2000 for the vacant title. Machado successfully defended the title three times before losing to Luis Alberto Pérez by a split decision on January 4, 2003.

== Professional boxing record ==
47 fights	26 wins	20 losses
By knockout	12	10
By decision	14	9
By disqualification	0	1
Draws	1	

No.	Result	Record	Opponent	Type	Round, time	Date	Location	Notes
47	Loss	26–20–1	Gregory Vera	KO	2 (10), 1:30	9 Nov 2019	Internado Judicial, Trujillo, Venezuela	
46	Loss	26–19–1	Franklin Gonzalez	KO	3 (10), 2:46	31 May 2019	Gimnasio Mocho Navas, Petare, Venezuela	
45	Loss	26–18–1	Yeyery Castillo	RTD	3 (6), 3:00	16 Mar 2019	Coliseo Carlos 'Teo' Cruz, Santo Domingo, Dominican Republic	
44	Loss	26–17–1	Cesar Ignacio Paredes	RTD	6 (10), 3:00	26 May 2018	Gimnasio Mocho Navas, Petare, Venezuela	
43	Loss	26–16–1	Cesar Ignacio Paredes	MD	8	25 May 2018	Gimnasio Mocho Navas, Petare, Venezuela	
42	Loss	26–15–1	Norbelto Jimenez	TKO	6 (8), 2:29	26 Dec 2016	Maunoloa Night Club y Casino, Santo Domingo, Dominican Republic	
41	Loss	26–14–1	Elton Dharry	RTD	4 (10)	27 Feb 2016	Giftland Mall, Georgetown, Guyana	
40	Win	26–13–1	Jose Larreal	UD	8	21 Feb 2015	La Victoria, Venezuela	
39	Loss	25–13–1	Giovanni Caro	UD	10	20 Nov 2010	Arena Monterrey, Monterrey, Mexico	
38	Loss	25–12–1	Alexei Collado	UD	10	13 Feb 2010	National Stadium, Dublin, Ireland	Machado badly cut beside the left eye
37	Loss	25–11–1	Alexander Muñoz	UD	10	7 Nov 2009	El Domo Jose Maria Vargas, Maiquetía, Venezuela	
36	Loss	25–10–1	Mahyar Monshipour	RTD	4 (10), 3:00	13 Mar 2009	La Zenith Galaxy, Amnéville, France	Monshipour opened a nasty cut over Machado's right eye, forcing a corner retirement before the bell to start round 5
35	Loss	25–9–1	Hermin Isava	KO	2 (10)	16 Aug 2008	Estadio La Sabanita, Ciudad Bolívar, Venezuela	
34	Loss	25–8–1	Bernard Dunne	PTS	10	12 Apr 2008	International Events Arena - Breaffy House Resort, Castlebar, Ireland	
33	Loss	25–7–1	Franklin Varela	UD	12	30 Jul 2007	El Centro Sambil Margarita, Pampatar, Venezuela	For Venezuelan bantamweight title
32	Loss	25–6–1	Anselmo Moreno	UD	10	5 May 2006	Centro de Convenciones Atlapa, Panama City, Panama	For vacant WBA Fedebol and WBA Fedecentro bantamweight titles
31	Win	25–5–1	Franklin Varela	UD	10	25 Feb 2006	Centro Recreacional Yesterday, Turmero, Venezuela	
30	Win	24–5–1	Dioberto Julio	UD	10	21 May 2005	Ce.De.M. N° 2, Caseros, Argentina	
29	Loss	23–5–1	Luis Alberto Pérez	UD	12	13 Dec 2003	Boardwalk Hall, Atlantic City, New Jersey, U.S.	For IBF super flyweight title
28	Loss	23–4–1	Luis Alberto Pérez	SD	12	4 Jan 2003	D.C. Armory, Washington, District of Columbia, U.S.	Lost IBF super flyweight title
27	Win	23–3–1	Martín Castillo	TD	6 (12), 3:00	30 Mar 2002	Sovereign Center, Reading, Pennsylvania, U.S.	Retained IBF super flyweight title
26	Win	22–3–1	Mauricio Pastrana	UD	12	16 Jun 2001	Cintas Center, Cincinnati, Ohio, U.S.	Retained IBF super flyweight title
25	Win	21–3–1	William De Sousa	TKO	3 (12), 2:23	16 Dec 2000	Forum Bicentenario, de la Universidad de Aragua, Maracay, Venezuela	Retained IBF super flyweight title
24	Win	20–3–1	Julio Gamboa	UD	12	22 Aug 2000	American Airlines Arena, Miami, Florida, U.S.	Won vacant IBF super flyweight title
23	Draw	19–3–1	Julio Gamboa	SD	12	20 May 2000	Grand Casino, Tunica, Mississippi, U.S.	For vacant IBF super flyweight title
22	Win	19–3	Antonio Jaramillo	TKO	5 (10), 1:26	17 Nov 1999	Hotel El Panama, Panama City, Panama	
21	Win	18–3	Livaniel Alvarez	TKO	2 (?)	10 Aug 1999	El Paraíso, Venezuela	
20	Win	17–3	Jose Arroyo	TKO	2 (?)	23 Mar 1999	La Guaira, Venezuela	
19	Win	16–3	Saul Guaza	TKO	7 (?)	29 Aug 1998	Caracas, Venezuela	
18	Win	15–3	Euclides Bolivar	TKO	4 (?)	27 May 1998	Caracas, Venezuela	
17	Win	14–3	Rafael Castro	KO	6 (?)	5 Mar 1998	Caracas, Venezuela	
16	Win	13–3	Eidy Moya	UD	10	27 Sep 1997	Gymnasio Jose Beracasa, Caracas, Venezuela	
15	Loss	12–3	Daorung Chuvatana	SD	12	15 Mar 1997	Satun Stadium, Satun, Thailand	For WBA bantamweight title
14	Win	12–2	Vicente Rivera	TKO	5 (?)	14 Oct 1996	Turmero, Venezuela	
13	Win	11–2	Jesus Rattia	TKO	6 (12)	15 Jun 1996	Los Teques, Venezuela	Won WBA Fedelatin super flyweight title
12	Win	10–2	Alcibel Flores	TKO	6 (?)	29 Apr 1996	Turmero, Venezuela	
11	Loss	9–2	Adonis Cruz	DQ	8 (12)	16 Dec 1995	Managua, Nicaragua	For WBC FECARBOX super flyweight title
10	Win	9–1	Fernando Blanco	PTS	12	26 Aug 1995	Ciudad Bolívar, Venezuela	Won Venezuelan bantamweight title
9	Win	8–1	Jesus Rattia	PTS	10	20 May 1995	La Asunción, Venezuela	
8	Win	7–1	Edison Torres	PTS	10	11 Mar 1995	La Guaira, Venezuela	
7	Win	6–1	Alfredo Aponte	TKO	6 (?)	10 Dec 1994	Los Teques, Venezuela	
6	Win	5–1	Luiz Longa	KO	5 (?)	20 Aug 1994	Ciudad Bolívar, Venezuela	
5	Win	4–1	Tirso Rivera	PTS	8	6 Jul 1994	Venezuela	
4	Win	3–1	Antonio Osorio	PTS	6	4 Oct 1993	Gimnasio Luis Ramos, Puerto La Cruz, Venezuela	
3	Win	2–1	Elvis Montoya	PTS	6	30 Sep 1993	Venezuela	
2	Win	1–1	Elvis Montoya	PTS	6	6 Aug 1993	Turmero, Venezuela	
1	Loss	0–1	Jesus Rattia	TKO	3 (4)	17 Apr 1993	Caracas, Venezuela	

Preceded by Mark Johnson; Vacated	IBF Super Flyweight Champion; 2000 Jul 22 – 2003 Jan 4	Succeeded by Luis Alberto Pérez
