= Dimitri Kirilov =

Russian boxer

Dmitry Kirillov Дмитрий Кириллов
Personal information
- Nickname: The Baby
- Born: Dmitry Dmitrievich Kirillov; 24 November 1978 (age 47) Saint Petersburg, Russian SFSR, Soviet Union (now Russia)
- Height: 5 ft 4 in (163 cm)
- Weight: Super flyweight; Bantamweight; Super bantamweight; Featherweight; Super featherweight

Boxing career
- Stance: Orthodox

Boxing record
- Total fights: 39
- Wins: 31
- Win by KO: 9
- Losses: 7
- Draws: 1

Dimitri Kirilov (Russian: Дмитрий Дмитриевич Кириллов; born November 24, 1978) is a Russian former professional boxer who competed from 1998 to 2015. He held the International Boxing Federation (IBF) super-flyweight title from 2007 to 2008.

== Professional career ==
On October 13, 2007, Kirilov defeated José Navarro by unanimous decision in twelve rounds to capture the vacant IBF super flyweight championship. The judges scored it 116–112, 114–113, and 114–113; the bout would have been a majority draw had Kirilov not downed Navarro in the third round.

On February 28, 2008, Kirilov managed to retain his IBF super flyweight title against Cecilio Santos as the match ended in majority draw.

On August 2, 2008, Kirilov lost his title to Vic Darchinyan, a former IBF flyweight champion, by 5th round KO.

== Professional boxing record ==
39 fights	31 wins	7 losses
By knockout	9	3
By decision	22	4
Draws	1	

No.	Result	Record	Opponent	Type	Round, time	Date	Location	Notes
39	Loss	31–7–1	Evgeny Chuprakov	KO	8 (12)	2015-09-26	Arena, Yekaterinburg, Russia	For vacant WBO European super-featherweight title
38	Loss	31–6–1	Dennis Ceylan	UD	10 (10)	2015-03-14	Ballerup Super Arena, Ballerup, Denmark	
37	Loss	31–5–1	Marco McCullough	RTD	8 (10)	2014-09-06	Titanic Quarter, Belfast, Northern Ireland	For WBO European featherweight title
36	Win	31–4–1	Andrey Kostin	UD	6 (6)	2013-09-19	Casino Conti, Saint Petersburg, Russia	
35	Win	30–4–1	Alexander Saltykov	TD	4 (6)	2013-05-15	Casino Conti, Saint Petersburg, Russia	
34	Loss	29–4–1	Vic Darchinyan	KO	5 (12)	2008-08-02	Emerald Queen Casino, Tacoma, Washington, U.S.	Lost IBF super-flyweight title
33	Draw	29–3–1	Cecilio Santos	MD	12 (12)	2008-02-28	Roseland Ballroom, New York City, New York, U.S.	Retained IBF super-flyweight title
32	Win	29–3	José Navarro	UD	12 (12)	2007-10-13	Khodynka Ice Palace, Moscow, Russia	Won vacant IBF super-flyweight title
31	Loss	28–3	Luis Alberto Pérez	SD	12 (12)	2006-05-06	DCU Center, Worcester, Massachusetts, U.S.	For IBF super-flyweight title
30	Win	28–2	Reynaldo Lopez	MD	12 (12)	2005-09-10	Ice Palace Sokolniki, Moscow, Russia	
29	Win	27–2	James Wanene	TKO	5 (10)	2005-04-28	Soviet Wings Sport Palace, Moscow, Russia	
28	Win	26–2	Marsel Kasimov	UD	10 (10)	2004-12-16	Centr na Tulskoy, Moscow, Russia	Won vacant Russian bantamweight title
27	Win	25–2	Gennadiy Delisandru	RTD	6 (8)	2004-09-24	Ice Sports Palace Sibir, Novosibirsk, Russia	
26	Win	24–2	Georghe Oprea	TKO	3 (10)	2004-07-06	Soviet Wings Sport Palace, Moscow, Russia	
25	Loss	23–2	Masamori Tokuyama	UD	12 (12)	2004-01-03	Central Gym, Osaka, Japan	For WBC super-flyweight title
24	Win	23–1	Ravil Mukhamadiyarov	TKO	3 (8)	2003-04-19	Circus, Saint Petersburg, Russia	
23	Win	22–1	Viktar Hancharenka	UD	6 (6)	2002-12-21	Yubileyny Sports Palace, Saint Petersburg, Russia	
22	Win	21–1	Serhiy Ursuliak	TKO	3 (4)	2002-10-03	Casino Conti, Saint Petersburg, Russia	
21	Loss	20–1	Spend Abazi	UD	12 (12)	2002-03-15	Viborg Stadionhal, Viborg, Denmark	For European bantamweight title
20	Win	20–0	Sergey Tasimov	UD	6 (6)	2001-10-09	Vyborg, Russia	
19	Win	19–0	Nathan Sting	PTS	6 (6)	2001-07-21	Ponds Forge, Sheffield, England	
18	Win	18–0	Junver Halog	UD	10 (10)	2001-04-13	CSKA Moscow, Moscow, Russia	Retained WBC Youth super-flyweight title
17	Win	17–0	Redha Jean Abbas	PTS	6 (6)	2001-02-24	York Hall, London, England	
16	Win	16–0	Anthony Hanna	PTS	6 (6)	2000-10-31	Novotel Hotel, London, England	
15	Win	15–0	Julio De la Basez	RTD	8 (10)	2000-03-10	Yubileyny Sports Palace, Saint Petersburg, Russia	Retained WBC Youth super-flyweight title
14	Win	14–0	Daniel Ward	UD	8 (8)	1999-12-25	Stedelijke Sporthalle, Izegem, Belgium	
13	Win	13–0	Rafael Torres	TKO	5 (8)	1999-11-01	Izegem, Belgium	
12	Win	12–0	Christopher Denicker	UD	10 (10)	1999-09-29	Soviet Wings Sport Palace, Moscow, Russia	Won vacant WBC Youth super-flyweight title
11	Win	11–0	Harry Woods	UD	6 (6)	1999-06-04	Polideportivo Ciudad Jardín, Málaga, Spain	
10	Win	10–0	Jose Ramon Bartolome	TKO	3 (6)	1999-04-23	Pabellón Príncipe Felipe, Zaragoza, Spain	
9	Win	9–0	Sergey Ryazantsev	UD	8 (8)	1999-03-25	Tundra Bar, Saint Petersburg, Russia	
8	Win	8–0	Said Karimov	UD	8 (8)	1999-02-23	Tundra Bar, Saint Petersburg, Russia	
7	Win	7–0	Bela Sandor	UD	8 (8)	1998-12-25	Izegem, Belgium	
6	Win	6–0	Oscar Alfonso Flores	TKO	6 (8)	1998-11-01	Izegem, Belgium	
5	Win	5–0	Patricio Chikokolo	UD	8 (8)	1998-09-17	Casino Conti, Saint Petersburg, Russia	
4	Win	4–0	Vadim Zakharikov	UD	6 (6)	1998-08-22	Tundra Bar, Saint Petersburg, Russia	
3	Win	3–0	Alexander Kolosov	UD	6 (6)	1998-06-27	Tundra Bar, Saint Petersburg, Russia	
2	Win	2–0	Ariel Shumski	UD	4 (4)	1998-06-09	Circus, Moscow, Russia	
1	Win	1–0	Gennadi Sukmanov	UD	4 (4)	1998-05-02	Navy Sport Club, Kronstadt, Russia	

== See also ==
- List of male boxers
- List of world super-flyweight boxing champions

Sporting positions
Regional boxing titles
New title	WBC Youth super-flyweight champion 29 September 1999 – 2002; Vacated	Vacant Title next held by David Martínez
Vacant Title last held by Alexander Pak	Russian bantamweight champion 16 December 2004 – 2006; Vacated	Vacant Title next held by Timur Shailezov
World boxing titles
Vacant Title last held by Luis Alberto Pérez	IBF super-flyweight champion 13 October 2007 – 2 August 2008	Succeeded by Vic Darchinyan
