= Z Gorres =

Filipino boxer

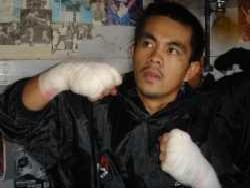
- Gorres in 2007

Personal information
- Nickname: The Dream
- Nationality: Filipino
- Born: Zeta Celestino Oliveros Gorres; April 18, 1982 (age 44) Nasipit, Agusan del Norte, Philippines
- Height: 5 ft 4 1/2 in (164 cm)
- Weight: Flyweight; Super flyweight Bantamweight

Boxing career
- Reach: 64 1/2 in (164 cm)
- Stance: Southpaw

Boxing record
- Total fights: 35
- Wins: 31
- Win by KO: 17
- Losses: 2
- Draws: 2

Zeta Celestino Oliveros Gorres (born 18 April 1982) is a Filipino former professional boxer who challenged once for the WBO super-flyweight title.

== Personal life ==
Gorres has a brother named Jun Gorres who was formerly a boxer but was stabbed to death in a street fight. His real name is a combination of those of his parents; Zeta (mother) and Celestino (father) Gorres. Gorres is married to Datchess Gorres and has four children.

== Boxing career ==
Gorres became a boxing practitioner at 9 years of age. He began fighting as a professional on March 31, 2001. After winning 13 bouts in a row, he fought Edgar Rodrigo for the Philippine flyweight title on June 1, 2003. He, however, lost to Rodrigo by TKO in the 9th round which marked his first defeat.

One of Gorres' significant victories was his 1st round stoppage of Glenn Donaire, brother of pound for pound champion Nonito Donaire, on March 19, 2005. This was his first bout in the United States.

About a year later, he won the OPBF super flyweight title against Waenpetch Chuwatana.

On February 24, 2007, Gorres got a shot for a world title where he challenged WBO super flyweight champion Fernando Montiel in a bout held in Gorres' hometown. There, Gorres was docked a point twice (one in the 10th and another in the 12th round) for holding. Montiel won the fight and defended the title in a split decision.

He fought former IBF flyweight champion Vic Darchinyan on February 2, 2008, in an IBF title eliminator. The winner was to face then IBF super flyweight titlist Dimitri Kirilov of Russia who would later be dethroned by Darchinyan on August 2, 2008. The match, however, was tarnished by poor refereeing and bottle-throwing from spectators who disliked it. The bout ended in a split draw. Nonetheless, Darchinyan won the right to fight for the championship because he was ranked higher than Gorres in IBF.

Gorres moved to bantamweight and won his first match in that division on March 14, 2009. There, he bested former IBF minimumweight champion Roberto Carlos Leyva in 7 rounds.

=== Career-ending injury ===
On November 13, 2009, after winning a 10-round bout against Luis Melendez in which he was knocked down with 30 seconds remaining in the final round, Gorres collapsed in the ring and was removed on a stretcher. He underwent surgery to relieve swelling to the left side of his brain. Originally, doctors were going to keep him in a medically induced coma for a few days, but Gorres reacted to the treatment much better than anticipated and came out of it. The injury he suffered ended his boxing career.

== Professional boxing record ==
35 fights	31 wins	2 losses
By knockout	17	1
By decision	14	1
Draws	2	

No.	Result	Record	Opponent	Opponent's Record	Type	Round, Time	Date	Location	Notes
35	Win	31–2–2	(Colombia) Luis Melendez	26–3–1	UD	10	13 Nov 2009	(United States) Mandalay Bay House of Blues, Las Vegas	
34	Win	30–2–2	(Mexico) Cruz Carbajal	29–16–2	RTD	6 (10) 0:10	12 Sep 2009	(Mexico) Palenque de la Feria, Tepic	Stopped due to Dislocated Arm
33	Win	29–2–2	(Mexico) Roberto Carlos Leyva	26–8–1	TKO	7 (12) 1:29	14 Mar 2009	(Philippines) Cebu City Waterfront Hotel & Casino, Barangay Lahug, Cebu City	Won vacant WBO Oriental bantamweight title
32	Win	28–2–2	(Kenya) Nick Otiento	15–1	UD	10	31 May 2008	(Philippines) Cebu City Waterfront Hotel & Casino, Barangay Lahug, Cebu City	
31	Draw	27–2–2	(Armenia) Vic Darchinyan	29–1	SD	12	2 Feb 2008	(Philippines) Cebu City Waterfront Hotel & Casino, Barangay Lahug, Cebu City	IBF super flyweight Title eliminator
30	Win	27–2–1	(Mexico) Eric Ortiz	27–6–1	TKO	8 (12) 2:15	11 Aug 2007	(United States) Arco Arena, Sacramento	Won vacant IBF Inter-Continental super flyweight title
29	Loss	26–2–1	(Mexico) Fernando Montiel	33–2–1	SD	12	24 Feb 2007	(Philippines) Cebu City Sports Complex, Cebu City	For WBO super flyweight title
28	Win	26–1–1	(Indonesia) Sonny Manakane	9–3–1	TKO	4 (10) 1:11	21 Oct 2006	(Philippines) Mandaue City Sports and Cultural Complex, Barangay Centro, Mandaue City	
27	Win	25–1–1	(Colombia) Pedro Rincon Miranda	30–10–2	UD	10	27 May 2006	(United States) Home Depot Center, Carson	
26	Win	24–1–1	(Thailand) Waenpetch Chuwatana	23–7–2	UD	12	18 Mar 2006	(Philippines) Mandaue City Sports and Cultural Complex, Barangay Centro, Mandaue City	Won vacant OPBF super flyweight title
25	Win	23–1–1	(Mexico) Jose Alfredo Tirado	20–7	UD	10	3 Feb 2006	(United States) Orleans Hotel & Casino, Las Vegas	
24	Win	22–1–1	(Thailand) Wisanu Kokietgym	16–5–1	TKO	4 (10) 1:36	29 Oct 2005	(Philippines) Mandaue City Sports and Cultural Complex, Barangay Centro, Mandaue City	OPBF super flyweight title eliminator
23	Win	21–1–1	(Thailand) Krabuan Butrprom	22–11–2	UD	10	30 Jul 2005	(Philippines) San Andres Civic & Sports Center, District of Malate, Manila	
22	Win	20–1–1	(Philippines) Glenn Donaire	13–1	TKO	1 (10) 2:03	19 Mar 2005	(United States) MGM Grand Garden Arena, Las Vegas	
21	Win	19–1–1	(Thailand) Chaiyong Sithsaithong	6–3	UD	10	11 Dec 2004	(Philippines) MC Home Depot Open Air Arena, Taguig City	
20	Win	18–1–1	(Thailand) Sairung Singwancha	32–6	UD	10	4 Sep 2004	(Philippines) Mandaue City Sports and Cultural Complex, Barangay Centro, Mandaue City	
19	Win	17–1–1	(South Korea) Yun Chul Yuh	7–14–3	TKO	2 (10) 2:36	31 May 2004	(South Korea) University Gym, Bucheon	
18	Draw	16–1–1	(Philippines) Randy Mangubat	32–18–11	TD	2 (10) 1:35	20 Feb 2004	(Philippines) Makati Coliseum, Makati City	
17	Win	16–1	(Philippines) Eric Barcelona	25–4–5	SD	10	20 Dec 2003	(Philippines) Subic Sports Complex, Subic Bay Freeport Zone, Olongapo City	
16	Win	15–1	(Philippines) Ryan Campesino	6–2–1	KO	5 (10) ?	4 Oct 2003	(Philippines) Mandaue City Sports and Cultural Complex, Barangay Centro, Mandaue City	
15	Win	14–1	(Philippines) Rommel Libradilla	11–12	TKO	3 (10) 1:17	30 Aug 2003	(Philippines) Gaisano Country Mall Parking Lot, Barangay Banilad, Cebu City	
14	Loss	13–1	(Philippines) Edgar Rodrigo	9–3–4	TKO	9 (12) 1:00	1 Jun 2003	(Philippines) Makati Coliseum, Makati City	
13	Win	13–0	(Philippines) Roy Balataria	8–6–1	TKO	6 (12) ?	15 Mar 2003	(Philippines) Luna Park Quirino Grand Stand, Manila	
12	Win	12–0	(Philippines) Ricky Escaner	8–3	KO	4 (10) 0:40	19 Jan 2003	(Philippines) Gaisano Country Mall Parking Lot, Barangay Banilad, Cebu City	
11	Win	11–0	(Philippines) Sherwin Manatad	6–4–2	KO	4 (10) 2:17	16 Dec 2002	(Philippines) Municipal Coliseum, Sogod	
10	Win	10–0	(Philippines) Flash Murillo	24–8–1	UD	10	19 Oct 2002	(Philippines) Mandaue City Sports and Cultural Complex, Barangay Centro, Mandaue City	
9	Win	9–0	(Philippines) Jonnie Coma	6–7–1	TKO	3 (10) 2:39	31 Aug 2002	(Philippines) New Cebu Coliseum, Cebu City	
8	Win	8–0	(Philippines) Reynaldo Mutia	0–1	KO	2 (10) ?	31 Jul 2002	(Philippines) Gaisano Country Mall Parking Lot, Barangay Banilad, Cebu City	
7	Win	7–0	(Philippines) Allan Ranada	4–2	UD	10	25 May 2002	(Philippines) Mandaue City Sports & Cultural Complex, Barangay Centro, Mandaue City	
6	Win	6–0	(Philippines) Flash Eraham	14–6–3	PTS	10	13 Apr 2002	(Philippines) Makati Coliseum, Makati City	
5	Win	5–0	(Philippines) Junric Velono	11–11	TKO	2 (?) ?	20 Jan 2002	(Philippines) Barangay Banilad, Cebu City	
4	Win	4–0	(Philippines) Bert Cano	23–6–3	MD	10	7 Dec 2001	(Philippines) Mandaue City Sports and Cultural Complex, Barangay Centro, Mandaue City	
3	Win	3–0	(Thailand) Sornthong Mungmeeveeraphum	Debut	TKO	8 (?) ?	10 Aug 2001	(Philippines) Barangay Lahug, Cebu City	Injury Stoppage.
2	Win	2–0	(Philippines) Efren Ubanan	Debut	TKO	4 (?) ?	20 Apr 2001	(Philippines) Barangay Pitalo, San Fernando	
1	Win	1–0	(Philippines) Rudy Hibaya	1–0	UD	6	31 Mar 2001	(Philippines) Cebu City Waterfront Hotel & Casino, Barangay Lahug, Cebu City	Professional Debut

== Going home ==
In February 2010, Gorres was well enough to fly home to the Philippines, where he was greeted at the airport by Philippine President Gloria Macapagal Arroyo. His physical therapy continued at Perpetual Succur Hospital in Cebu. His therapy involved the strengthening and conditioning of his muscles to help him regain the ability to do functional activities. Gorres began to regain his ability to walk and regained partial control of his left hand. He also underwent a series of surgeries for throat blockage.
