= Glenn Donaire =

American boxer

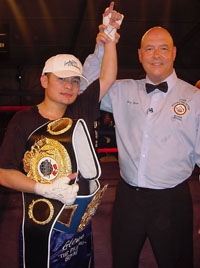
- Donaire (left) in 2007

Personal information
- Nicknames: The Filipino Bomber; Matador; Boyet
- Nationality: Filipino; American
- Born: Glenn Gonzales Donaire; December 7, 1979 (age 46) General Santos, Philippines
- Height: 5 ft 3 in (160 cm)
- Weight: Light flyweight; Flyweight

Boxing career
- Stance: Orthodox

Boxing record
- Total fights: 25
- Wins: 19
- Win by KO: 10
- Losses: 5
- Draws: 1

Glenn Gonzales Donaire (born December 7, 1979) is a Filipino American former professional boxer who competed from 2000 to 2012, and challenged twice for world titles at flyweight and light flyweight. He is the older brother of former four-weight world champion Nonito Donaire.

== Boxing career ==
Originally a bus driver, Glenn Donaire compiled a 52-8 amateur record and earning various local and regional titles, made it to the semi-finals of the US Olympic Trials in 2000 and lost a highly disputed decision to former world champion Brian Viloria. Glenn is very proud to be a Filipino boxer and has worn the Philippine flag on his trunks his entire career. He wears blue boxing trunks while his younger brother Nonito wears red boxing trunks to represent the Philippine flag.

November 22, 2003 Glenn Donaire won his first professional title by defeating Wangpanom Vor Saktawee by a 12 round decision in Guam for the WBO Asia Pacific flyweight title.

May 5, 2006, Glenn won the NABO and NABA flyweight titles by defeating Cesar Lopez by a 12 round decision. The scores were 115-112, 116-111 and 117-110. Lopez was docked a point for low blows. Glenn was offered the fight after his brother Nonito was injured.

October 7, 2006, Donaire got a shot at Vic Darchinyan's IBF flyweight title. However, he lost to Darchinyan by a sixth round technical decision. The fight was stopped in the 4th round due to a broken/locked jaw suffered by Donaire from an alleged elbow attack. Replays show no evidence of an elbow, and Darchinyan's camp has always claimed this should have been a legitimate knockout. The scores were 60-53 on all three cards for Darchinyan. For 1 year, 4 months and 15 days, Donaire had been inactive.

After the long hiatus Glenn Donaire took on Jose Albuquerque on February 22, 2008. Donaire won the bout by unanimous decision.

Subsequently, Donaire moved up a weight class and defeated Omar Salado in Mexico City to win the vacant WBC Latino super flyweight title by unanimous decision on March 16, 2012.

== Professional boxing record ==
| 25 fights | 19 wins | 5 losses |
|---|---|---|
| By knockout | 10 | 1 |
| By decision | 9 | 4 |
| Draws | 1 | |

| No. | Result | Record | Opponent | Type | Round, Time | Date | Location | Notes |
|---|---|---|---|---|---|---|---|---|
| 25 | Loss | 19–5–1 | Omar Soto | UD | 12 | 14 Sep 2012 | A La Carte Event Pavilion, Tampa, US | For WBC Latino flyweight title |
| 24 | Win | 19–4–1 | Omar Salado | UD | 12 | 16 Mar 2012 | Auditorio Plaza Condesa, Mexico City, Mexico | Won vacant WBC Latino super flyweight title |
| 23 | Win | 18–4–1 | Alex Sanchez | RTD | 8 (12) 3:00 | 9 Dec 2011 | Kissimmee Civic Center, Kissimmee, US | |
| 22 | Loss | 17–4–1 | Ulises Solís | UD | 12 | 12 Jul 2008 | Palenque EXPOGAN Senora, Hermosillo, Mexico | For IBF junior flyweight title |
| 21 | Win | 17–3–1 | José Albuquerque | UD | 8 | 22 Feb 2008 | Silver Legacy Resort & Casino, Reno, US | |
| 20 | Loss | 16–3–1 | Vic Darchinyan | TD | 6 (12) 1:27 | 7 Oct 2006 | Mandalay Bay Resort & Casino, Las Vegas, US | For IBF and IBO flyweight titles |
| 19 | Win | 16–2–1 | Cesar Lopez | UD | 12 | 5 May 2006 | Lucky Star Casino, Concho, US | Won NABF and vacant WBO NABO flyweight titles |
| 18 | Draw | 15–2–1 | José Albuquerque | PTS | 6 | 3 Mar 2006 | Chumash Casino, Santa Ynez, US | |
| 17 | Win | 15–2 | Benito Abraham | TKO | 6 (6) 1:10 | 5 Nov 2005 | Caesars Tahoe, Stateline, US | |
| 16 | Win | 14–2 | Juan Alfonso Keb Baas | UD | 10 | 24 Jun 2005 | Morongo Casino, Resort & Spa, Cabazon, US | |
| 15 | Loss | 13–2 | Z Gorres | TKO | 1 (10) 2:03 | 19 Mar 2003 | MGM Grand Las Vegas, Las Vegas, US | |
| 14 | Win | 13–1 | Roberto Gomez | TKO | 3 (6) 2:30 | 25 Sep 2004 | PAL West Wind Gym, Oakland, US | |
| 13 | Win | 12–1 | Leonardo Castillo | UD | 6 | 18 Jun 2004 | Quiet Cannon, Montebello, US | |
| 12 | Win | 11–1 | Bernardo Oclos | UD | 8 | 19 Oct 2003 | Cantada Sports Center, Barangay Bagumbayan, Taguig City, Philippines | |
| 11 | Win | 10–1 | Wangpanom Vor Saktawee | UD | 12 | 22 Nov 2002 | Guam University Field House, Agana, Guam | Won vacant WBO Asia Pacific flyweight title |
| 10 | Win | 9–1 | Ben Albanez | KO | 1 (8) | 2 Nov 2002 | Cantada Sports Center, Barangay Bagumbayan, Taguig City, Philippines | |
| 9 | Win | 8–1 | Robert Tolibas | TKO | 5 (6) | 28 Sep 2002 | Cantada Sports Center, Barangay Bagumbayan, Taguig City, Philippines | |
| 8 | Win | 7–1 | Alvin Yacob | UD | 6 | 24 Jun 2002 | Cantada Sports Center, Barangay Bagumbayan, Taguig City, Philippines | |
| 7 | Win | 6–1 | Ruben Tunegas | UD | 6 | 22 Dec 2001 | Bren Guiao Convention Center, San Fernando City, Philippines | |
| 6 | Loss | 5–1 | Gabriel Elizondo | UD | 6 | 23 Sep 2001 | Sunset Station, San Antonio, US | |
| 5 | Win | 5–0 | Manuel Noyola | TKO | 6 (6) 0:38 | 8 Jun 2001 | Hollywood Park Casino, Inglewood, US | |
| 4 | Win | 4–0 | Jose Eduardo Perez | TKO | 1 (4) 2:31 | 8 Apr 2001 | River Palms Casino, Laughlin, US | |
| 3 | Win | 3–0 | Jose Antonio Rico | KO | 2 (4) 1:52 | 25 Jan 2001 | Hollywood Park Casino, Inglewood, US | |
| 2 | Win | 2–0 | Jose Manuel Ramirez | KO | 4 (4) 0:36 | 25 Nov 2000 | Hyatt Regency Hotel, Monterey, US | |
| 1 | Win | 1–0 | Eduardo Reyes | KO | 1 (4) 0:23 | 27 Aug 2000 | Del Mar Racetrack, Del Mar, US | |
