= Luis Del Valle =

Puerto Rican boxer

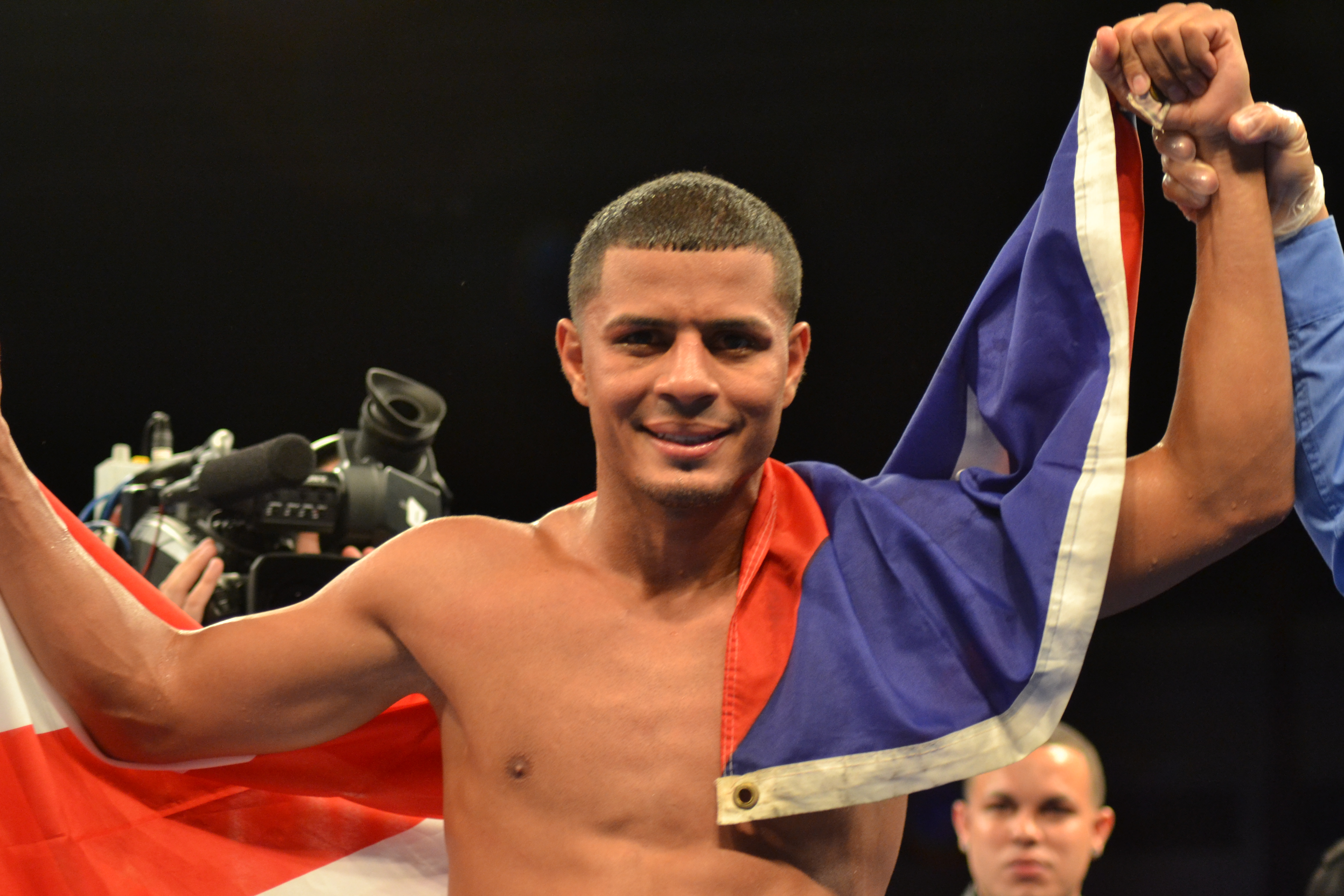

Personal information
- Nationality: Puerto Rican
- Born: Luis Orlando Del Valle Valentín; January 27, 1987 (age 39) Bayamón, Puerto Rico
- Weight: Featherweight

Boxing career
- Stance: Orthodox

Boxing record
- Total fights: 29
- Wins: 25
- Win by KO: 19
- Losses: 3
- Draws: 0
- No contests: 1

Luis Orlando Del Valle Valentín (born January 27, 1987) is a Puerto Rican professional boxer.

== Biography ==
Luis Orlando, is related to former WBO bantamweight champion Rafael del Valle. He began boxing at the age of 14 at the Caná Boxing Club in Bayamon, Puerto Rico. After losing his first amateur fight, he returned and in just one year he became Puerto Rico's National Junior Olympics champion, bringing medals to the island during his two-year reign. The trend continued as he represented the island at the 2004 under 19 World Championships in Korea. Being too young to try out for the 2004 Olympic team, his trainer sent him to New York where he won both the New York and National Golden Gloves tournaments representing Newburgh Boxing Club. His stunning rise through the ranks of the amateur boxing world took an unexpected turn when he was invited to the United States national team. “We decided to stay because things were going fine and traveling a lot. In Puerto Rico, Carlos Velazquez (2004 Olympian and current professional rising star) had decided to stay for the 2008 cycle and they only send the No. 1 to fight abroad. In the U.S., I had the chance to gain more international experience which has helped me a lot.”

Del Valle represented the United States at the 2007 Pan American Games and other international competitions such as the 2005 International Tammer Tournament in Tampere, Finland. 2006 Six Nation Cup in Porto Torres, Italy. 2006 Ken Goff Memorial Boxing Classic In Regina, Canada collecting two gold and a bronze medal in the process. Del Valle came up short against the eventual 2008 Olympic team member Raynell Williams in the U.S. Championships at 125 pounds.

== Amateur career ==
- Former Rank #1 in USA Amateurs Rankings at 125 lbs/57 kg
- Former USA Elite Team Member
- 2007 USA Team Pan Am Member (Rio de Janeiro, Brazil)
- Former 2004 National Golden Gloves Champion at 125 Lbs
- Former 3 Times NY Golden Gloves Champion at 125 lbs
- 2006 International Tournament Jose "Cheo" Aponte Gold Medalist in Caguas, Puerto Rico
- 2006 Ken Goff Memorial Boxing Classic Champion In Regina, Canada
- 2006 Six Nation Cup Gold Medalist in Porto Torres, Italy
- 2006 USA World Cup Team Member (Azerbaijan)
- 2005 USA Under 19 National Champion 125 lbs weight class
- 2005 International Tammer Tournament Bronze Medalist In Tampere, Finland
- Attend the 2004 Under 19 World Championship Tournament in Jeju City, Korea representing Puerto Rico.
- 2004 Under 19 Puerto Rico National Champion at 125 lbs

Del Valle began Boxing at the age of 14 losing his first amateur fight and ends his amateur career with a record of 112-14.

== Professional career ==
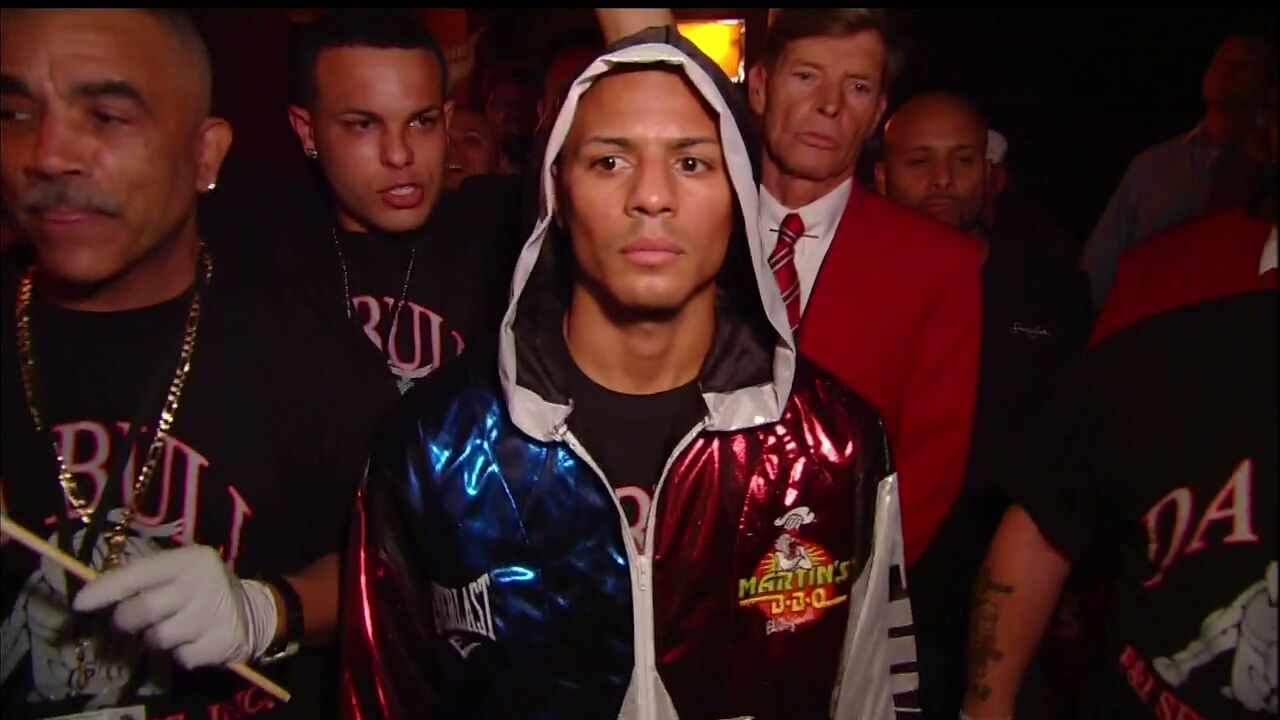
The Ring Walk

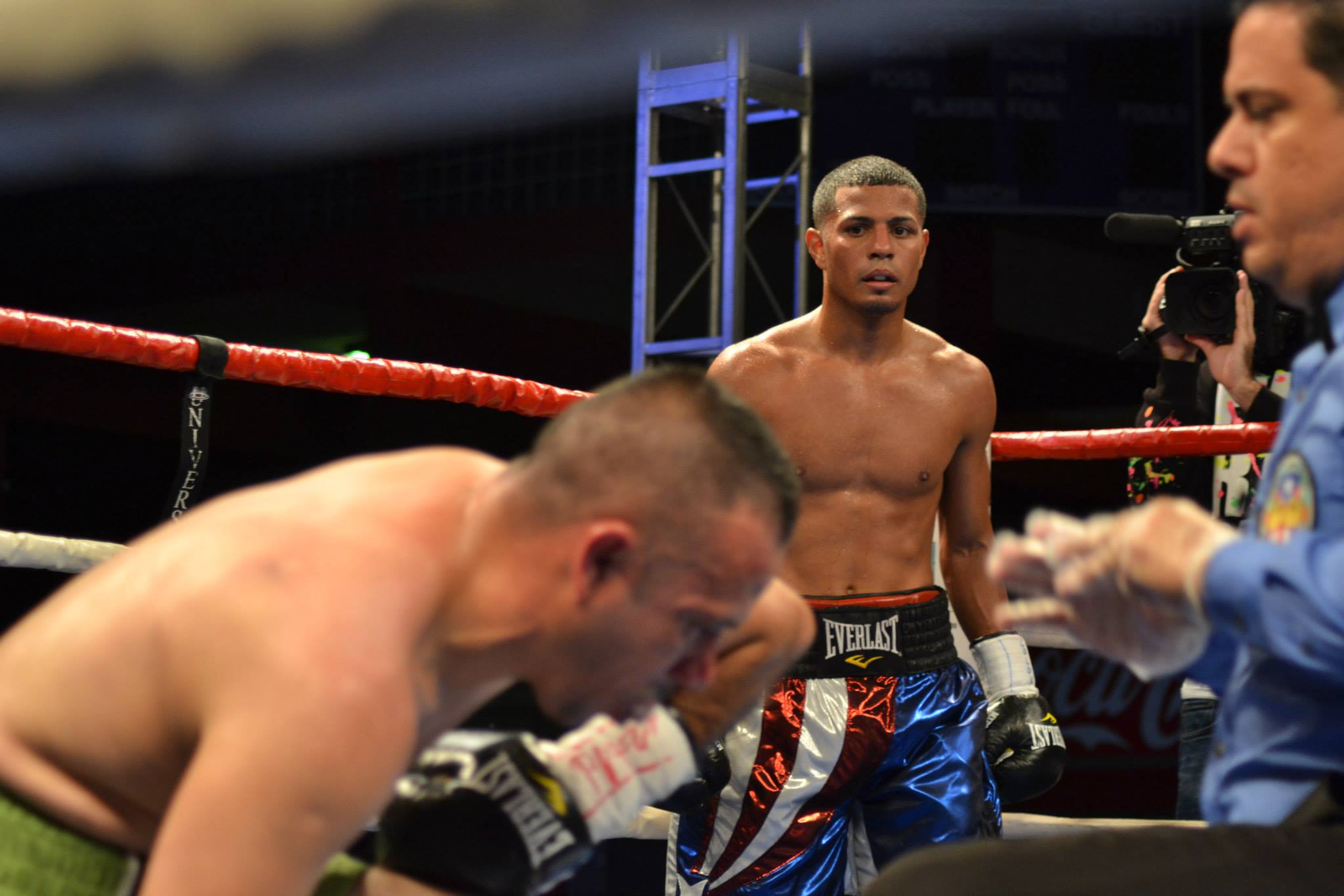
Scoring a Knock Down

After eight years and 126 amateurs fights Orlandito made his professional debut on April 11, 2008 defeating Rey Rivera by the way of third-round knockout. On September 27, 2008 fighting as a promotional free agent, Del Valle dominated Francisco Palacios to get a unanimous decision after six rounds of action. After signing with Lou Dibella of Dibella entertainment on August 26, 2010 Orlandito made his debut under the DBE banner stopping Robert Guillen impressively in five rounds. On October 24, 2009 he was back in Puerto Rico facing crafty southpaw Christopher Rivera. After an interesting first round where Rivera attempted to keep Del Valle in the center of the ring, Luis imposed his crowd-pleasing style dominating with a relentless attack to Rivera's body. The end came at the third round where a solid hook to the liver sent Rivera down for the count.

- On July 10, 2010 "Orlandito" stepped his career up a notch when he faced rugged veteran Pasqual Rouse for the New York State Featherweight Title. Del Valle utilized his resources to deal with Rouse's experience and rough style finally putting him down for the count in the fourth round. With the win Del Valle clinched his first professional boxing title having knocked out 80% of his opponents to date.
- As part of the Paul Williams-Sergio Martinez II undercard Del Valle had the chance to set the record straight against Noe Lopez Jr. Putting on a nearly flawless performance Orlandito dropped Lopez three times on his way to a third-round TKO victory.
- On February 18, 2011 fighting in Ponce Puerto Rico Del Valle moved to 12-0, 10 KOs by stopping fellow Puerto Rican Irvin Hernandez at 2:49 of round six.
- June 11, 2011 Showtime's ShoBox: The New Generation main event against fellow prospect Dat Nguyen in New York on the eve of the Puerto Rican day parade. Del Valle dominated by scores of 99-91 on all three official score cards.
- In September 2012 Del Valle made his HBO debut. In what was perceived as a big step up in competition at 16-0 he faced off against veteran three-division world champion "The Raging Bull" Vic Darchinyan 37-5-1. The experienced Darchinyan, arguably a worthy candidate for Hall of Fame induction showed that he had no plans on passing the torch. He imposed his style on the young prospect who put his heart, will and solid chin on display. Del Valles determination almost paid off when he managed to badly hurt the former champion with a left hook near the end of round 9. The experience and ring smarts of the veteran showed up as Darchinyan was able to hold on and survive the round en route to a 10-round unanimous decision win. "The Raging Bull" provided confirmation of his still excellent fighting shape against then top 10 pound for pounder Nonito Donaire. Darchinyan was leading on the scorecards when he was hurt and stopped in the 9th round.
- After the loss Del Valle moved to Mexico City to train with Hall of Fame trainer Nacho Beristain. In his first and only fight out of Beristain's Romanza Gym, Del Valle returned to the winning path with a 5th round stoppage of Andre Wilson.
- November 30, 2013 in Carolina Puerto Rico, Del Valle needed only four rounds to beat tough Mexican Juan Jose Beltran
- January 17, 2014 Del Valle was dominating cagey veteran Ira Terry when a cut caused by a head butt put an end to the fight which was ruled a no contest.
- On May 31, 2014 Orlandito faced off against rising prospect and fellow Puerto Rican Luis Rosa (16-0-0). A left hook from Del Valle sent Rosa to the canvas in the fifth round. Two rounds later Rosa was docked a point for low blows in what turned into a rough and bloody battle. In the end Rosa was awarded a controversial unanimous decision. Many observers expressed their disagreement with the final scorecards.

On March 14, 2015, Del Valle returned to Puerto Rico and faced Mexico's Rogelio Castaneda, a fighter who a few months earlier had gained notoriety in the island for losing a highly controversial majority decision against the unbeaten Puerto Rican prospect Jose "Wonder Boy" Lopez. Orlandito scored a TKO win after 8 action packed rounds. The knockout of Castaneda started a winning streak that helped Del Valle get back in the mix. After defeating Marylands, Thomas Snow (18-2) in Washington DC, he was back on track.

=== Right hand injury ===
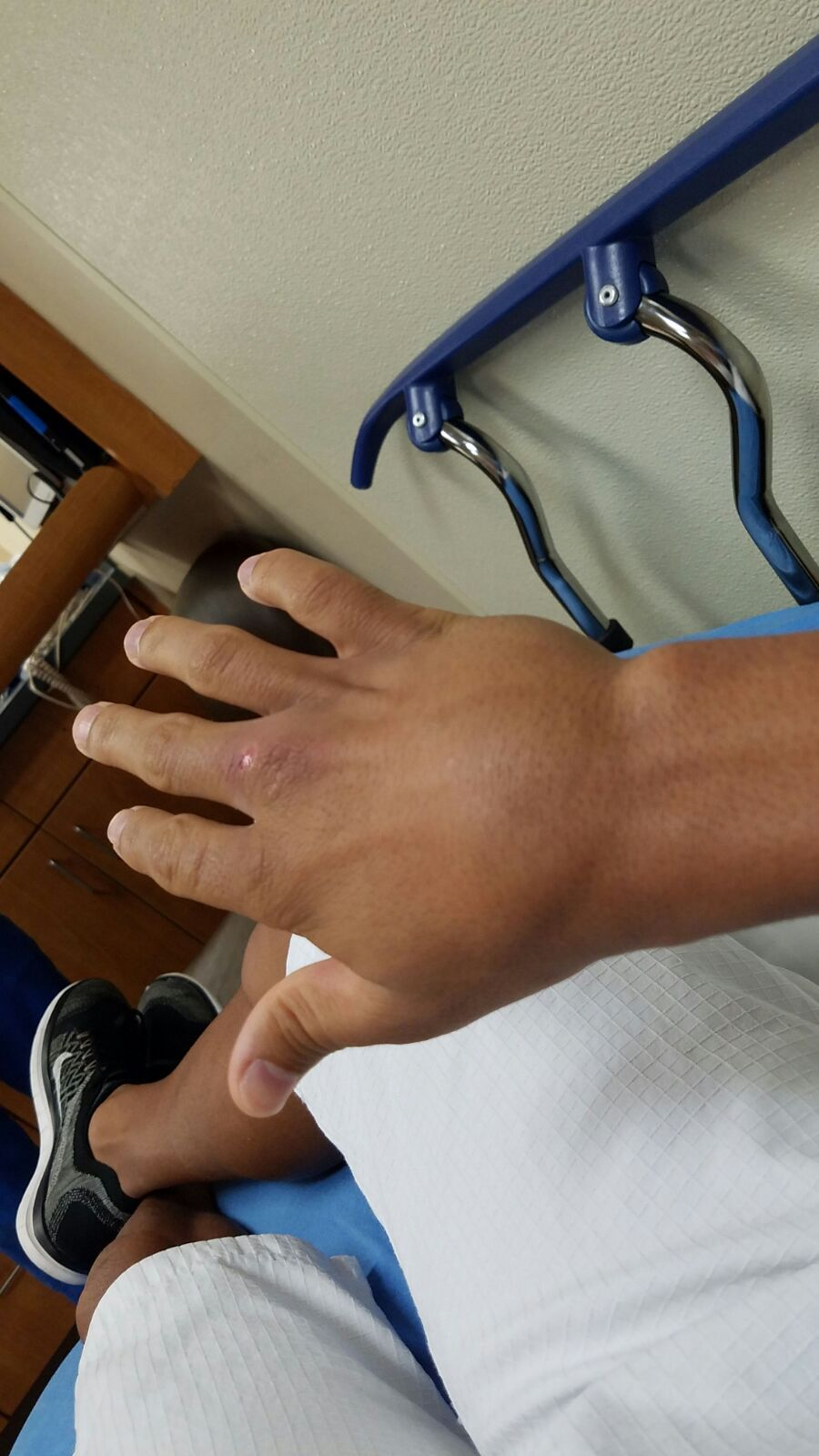
Post fight photo

On September 17, 2016 as part of the undercard for Canelo Álvarez vs Liam Smith, Del Valle faced off against highly touted prospect Diego de la Hoya. After being competitive for the first 3 rounds, Del Valle suffered a severe injury on his right hand and continued to fight despite the injury. De la Hoya went on to win a unanimous decision. Del Valle has been away from the ring ever since. He went through surgical procedures and is currently in the process of recovering from his 2016 injury. It is expected Del Valle could be making his return to the ring at some point in early 2019.

== Outside the ring ==
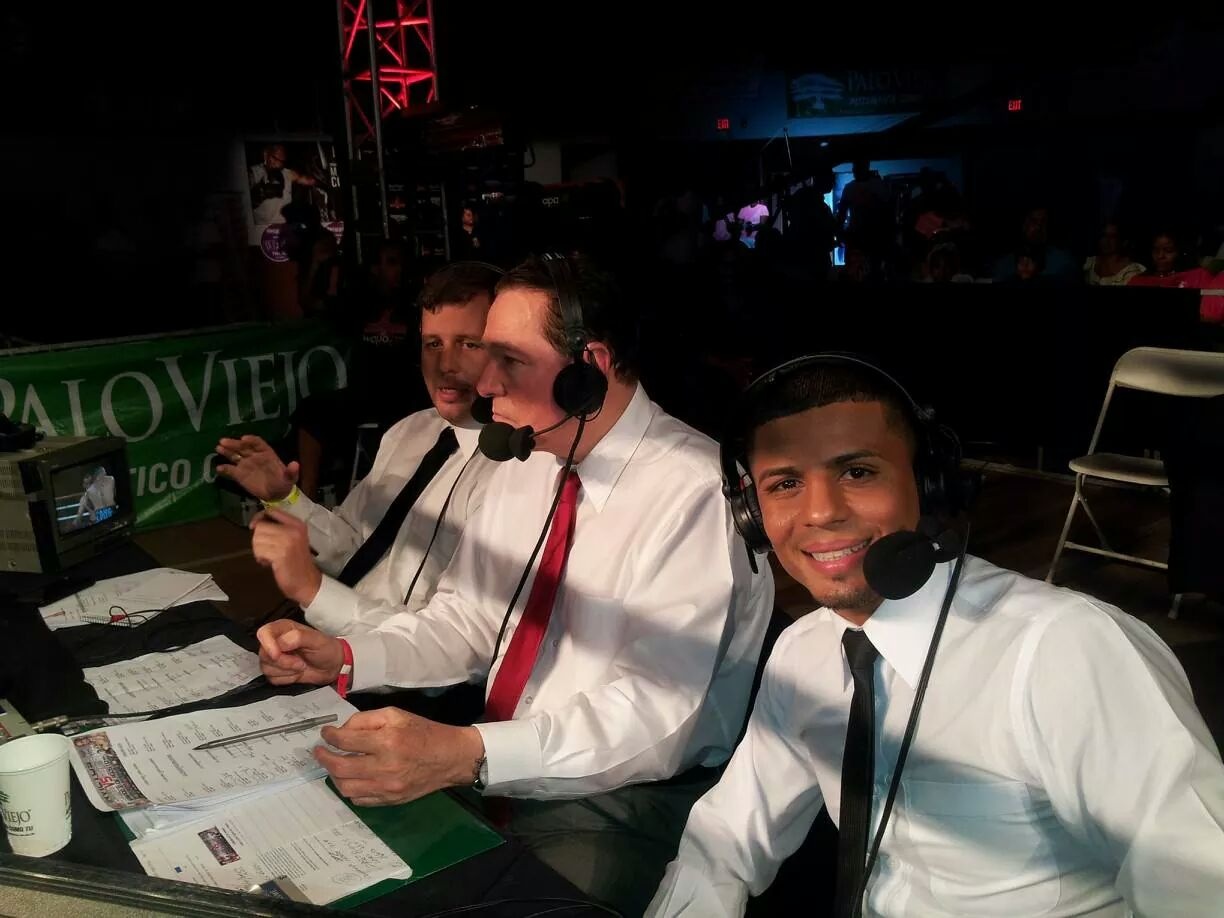
Del Valle working as a TV commentator

Since his initial move to the USA to compete at the Golden Gloves, New York became Del Valle's second home. He is now fully bilingual which allows him to connect directly with his New York fan base as well as with his Puerto Rican fan base mostly through his social media activity.

Del Valle considers himself a hardcore boxing fan and has become a recurrent TV commentator in various boxing cards. He hopes to one day be part of a broadcast team where he can contribute both in English and his native Spanish language.
