= Irene Pacheco =

Colombian boxer (born 1971)

Personal information
- Nickname: Mambaco
- Born: 26 March 1971 (age 55) San Juan de Urabá, Colombia
- Height: 5 ft 7 in (170 cm)
- Weight: Flyweight; Bantamweight

Boxing career
- Reach: 71 in (180 cm)
- Stance: Southpaw

Boxing record
- Total fights: 35
- Wins: 33
- Win by KO: 24
- Losses: 2

Irene Pacheco, also known as Mambaco, (born 26 March 1971 in San Juan de Urabá) is a Colombian former professional boxer who competed from 1993 to 2007. He held the IBF flyweight title from 1999 to 2004 and challenged for the WBO bantamweight title in 2007.

== Professional career ==
Pacheco turned pro in 1993 and won the vacant IBF flyweight title with a TKO of Luis Cox Coronado in Barranquilla in April 1999. Over a five-year period, Pacheco successfully defended the belt against boxers such as Masibulele Makepula, Mike Trejo, and Alejandro Félix Montiel, before losing it by TKO in a December 2004 fight against Vic Darchinyan.

In March 2007, he moved up in weight and took on Jhonny González, losing by TKO and announcing his retirement following the fight.

== Professional boxing record ==
35 fights	33 wins	2 losses
By knockout	24	2
By decision	9	0

No.	Result	Record	Opponent	Type	Round, time	Date	Location	Notes
35	Loss	33–2	Jhonny González	TKO	9 (12)	2007-03-30	Desert Diamond Casino, Tucson, Arizona, U.S.	For WBO bantamweight title
34	Win	33–1	Leon Moore	SD	12 (12)	2006-10-21	Coliseo Elias Chegwin, Barranquilla, Colombia	Won vacant WBO Inter-Continental bantamweight title
33	Win	32–1	Heriberto Ruiz	UD	12 (12)	2006-04-29	Mario Morales Coliseum, Guaynabo, Puerto Rico	
32	Win	31–1	Carlos Loaiza	KO	5 (10)	2006-02-23	Discoteca Escándalo, Cartagena, Colombia	
31	Loss	30–1	Vic Darchinyan	TKO	11 (12)	2004-12-16	Hard Rock Live, Hollywood, Florida, U.S.	Lost IBF flyweight title
30	Win	30–0	Damaen Kelly	TKO	7 (12)	2003-09-27	Salón Jumbo Country Club, Barranquilla, Colombia	Retained IBF flyweight title
29	Win	29–0	Alejandro Montiel	UD	12 (12)	2002-11-29	Convention Center, El Paso, Texas, U.S.	Retained IBF flyweight title
28	Win	28–0	Mike Trejo	TKO	4 (12)	2001-11-09	Sunset Station, San Antonio, Texas, U.S.	Retained IBF flyweight title
27	Win	27–0	Masibulele Makepula	MD	12 (12)	2000-11-10	Mandalay Bay Events Center, Paradise, Nevada, U.S.	Retained IBF flyweight title
26	Win	26–0	Pedro Peña	KO	11 (12)	2000-01-14	Don Haskins Center, El Paso, Texas, U.S.	Retained IBF flyweight title
25	Win	25–0	Ferid Ben Jeddou	KO	4 (12)	1999-10-16	Salón Jumbo Country Club, Barranquilla, Colombia	Retained IBF flyweight title
24	Win	24–0	Luis Cox Coronado	TKO	9 (12)	1999-04-10	Salón Jumbo Country Club, Barranquilla, Colombia	Won vacant IBF flyweight title
23	Win	23–0	Angel Antonio Priolo	KO	7 (?)	1998-09-04	Gimnasio de San Felipe, Barranquilla, Colombia	
22	Win	22–0	Henry Rodriguez	KO	4 (?)	1998-04-18	Barranquilla, Colombia	
21	Win	21–0	Elias Munoz	KO	3 (?)	1997-12-19	Coliseo Elias Chegwin, Barranquilla, Colombia	
20	Win	20–0	Yamil Valdelamar	KO	3 (?)	1997-10-31	Barranquilla, Colombia	
19	Win	19–0	Joel Garcia	KO	4 (?)	1997-09-19	Cartagena, Colombia	
18	Win	18–0	Silverio Martinez	KO	3 (?)	1997-08-08	Cartagena, Colombia	
17	Win	17–0	Eleodoro Urbina	TKO	6 (?)	1997-05-16	Barranquilla, Colombia	
16	Win	16–0	Luis Blanco	KO	4 (?)	1997-03-21	Barranquilla, Colombia	
15	Win	15–0	Benjamin Rivas	KO	2 (6)	1997-02-28	Cartagena, Colombia	
14	Win	14–0	Emilio Alvarado	TKO	2 (12)	1996-10-07	Maracay, Venezuela	Won vacant WBA Fedecentro flyweight title
13	Win	13–0	Elias Munoz	KO	1 (8)	1996-07-26	Gimnasio Cuadrilatero, Barranquilla, Colombia	
12	Win	12–0	Daniel Batista	PTS	6 (6)	1996-04-27	Coliseo Bernardo Caraballo, Cartagena, Colombia	
11	Win	11–0	Oswaldo Osorio	KO	1 (?)	1996-03-29	Cartagena, Colombia	
10	Win	10–0	Henry Rodriguez	KO	4 (?)	1995-05-20	Barranquilla, Colombia	
9	Win	9–0	Luis Blanco	TKO	4 (6)	1995-03-18	Coliseo Bernardo Caraballo, Cartagena, Colombia	
8	Win	8–0	Luis Blanco	PTS	6 (6)	1994-09-02	Cartagena, Colombia	
7	Win	7–0	Euclides Rodriguez	KO	3 (?)	1994-08-18	Cartagena, Colombia	
6	Win	6–0	Bernabe Franco	TKO	2 (4)	1994-06-10	Cartagena, Colombia	
5	Win	5–0	Osvaldo Lopez	PTS	4 (4)	1994-05-27	Cartagena, Colombia	
4	Win	4–0	Benjamin Rivas	PTS	4 (4)	1994-04-29	Santa Marta, Colombia	
3	Win	3–0	Farid Flores	KO	2 (?)	1994-04-10	Corferias, Bogotá, Colombia	
2	Win	2–0	Henry Rodriguez	PTS	4 (4)	1994-03-25	Barranquilla, Colombia	
1	Win	1–0	Wilmer Jinete	KO	4 (?)	1993-11-19	Cartagena, Colombia	

== Personal life ==
He returned to school and received his high school diploma in 2008.

== See also ==
- List of southpaw stance boxers
- List of world flyweight boxing champions

Sporting positions
Regional boxing titles
Vacant Title last held by Danny Nunez	WBA Fedecentro flyweight champion October 7, 1996 – 1997; Vacated	Vacant Title next held by Rubén Sánchez León
Vacant Title last held by Johnny Bredahl	WBO Inter-Continental bantamweight champion October 21, 2006 – 2006; Vacated	Vacant Title next held by Sebastien Gauthier
World boxing titles
Vacant Title last held by Mark Johnson	IBF flyweight champion April 10, 1999 – December 16, 2004	Succeeded by Vic Darchinyan
