= Mzukisi Sikali =

South African boxer

Personal information
- Nickname: Lacier
- Nationality: (South Africa) South African
- Born: Mzukisi Sikali; 30 July 1971 Port Elizabeth, Eastern Cape, South Africa
- Died: 16 September 2005 (aged 34) Uitenhage, Eastern Cape, South Africa
- Weight: Junior flyweight Flyweight; Super Flyweight

Boxing career
- Stance: Southpaw

Boxing record
- Total fights: 38
- Wins: 29
- Win by KO: 17
- Losses: 7
- Draws: 2
- No contests: 0

Mzukisi Sikali (30 July 1971 – 16 September 2005) was a South African boxer who served as a world champion in three different weight categories: junior flyweight, flyweight, and super flyweight.

== Murder ==
Sikali, who was regarded as one of South Africa's top boxers, was stabbed to death after he attempted to fight off a couple of muggers in Uitenhage, near Port Elizabeth. The muggers were arrested around an hour after the incident; and a mobile phone, which had been stolen from Sikali, was also recovered.

== Pro career ==
The last contest that Sikali fought before his death was a unification bout against the Armenian fighter Vic Darchinyan, in which Sikali lost his IBO flyweight title after the fight was stopped in the eighth round. His professional record was twenty-nine wins (seventeen by KO), seven losses, and two draws.

== See also ==
- List of boxing triple champions
