= Brian Battease =

American boxer (born 1983)

Brian Battease (born September 11, 1983 in Japan) is a professional boxer.

In 1989, Battease moved to Wahiawā, Hawai'i and began boxing. Battease became a six-time state champion during his amateur career, leading to a 3rd-place finish at Golden Gloves nationals in 2005.

== Professional career ==
Battease moved to Las Vegas, Nevada to turn professional. Battease remained undefeated until his seventh fight vs Dustin Day. After Battease landed a vicious combination that caused Dustin Day to put his hand on the canvas, referee Kenny Bayless did not score it a knockdown. Battease still received 38–37 score from Al Lefkowitz but judges C. J. Roth and Jerry Ross scored the bout in favor of Day, 38–37.

Battease responded with a convincing unanimous decision victory over Isaac Hidalgo, improving his professional record to 5–1.
