= Jakob Malz =

German boxer

Jakob Malz in 1934.

Jakob Malz (17 September 1902 – 1982) was a Galician-born German-Jewish amateur boxing champion. He emigrated to Britain before the Second World War to escape the Nazis and served in the Royal Pioneer Corps of the British Army. After the war he became a boxing instructor.

== Early life ==
Jakob Malz was born in Lemberg (now Lviv, Ukraine) on 17 September 1902. His father took the family to Basel in 1912 and then to Berlin 1913 where Malz completed his education.

== Sporting career ==
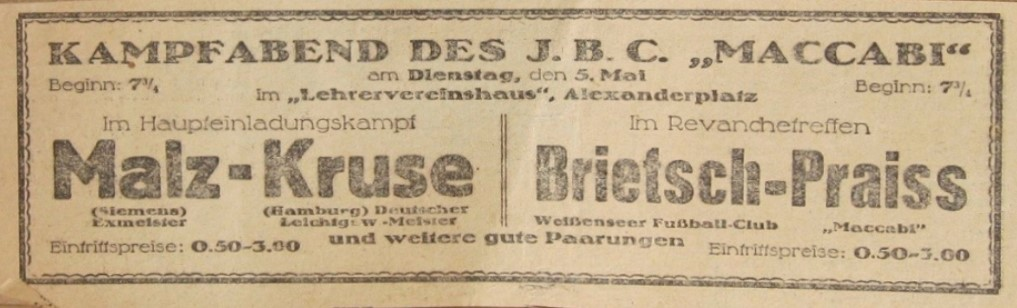
German advert for the Jewish Boxing Club's Maccabi fight night featuring the Malz-Kruse match.

Malz won athletics medals from at least 1921 and was boxing in Berlin from at least 1924. He was a member of the Jewish Maccabi team and also of the Teutonia club and was often caricatured in boxing journals. Among other awards, he won the Deutscher meister in 1924, the BBV meisterschaft in 1930 and was the makkabimeisterschaft champion for 1934.

== Second World War ==
Before the Second World War, Malz emigrated to Britain to escape the Nazis. He enlisted in the British Army in October 1940 and served in the Royal Pioneer Corps and the Civil Labour Unit where he rose to the rank of sergeant. On enlistment his trade was recorded as Physical Training Instructor but on discharge in 1945 he was stated to be a concretor.

== Post-war ==
After the war Malz worked as a boxing and gym trainer in London.

== Death and legacy ==
Malz died in 1982. In 2014, his running and boxing medals and plaques were donated to the Wiener Library for the Study of the Holocaust and Genocide in London.
