= Ronan Keenan =

American sportswriter

Ronan B. M. E. Keenan (1932–2007) was an American sports writer born in Queens, New York, in 1932, who emigrated with his family to South Africa at the age of eight. He began his writing career at the age of 14 when he had a boxing article published in the now defunct Natal Herald. He went on to be a renowned sports writer in South Africa.

In 1956 he published the book Boxing's Greatest Wars which was met with critical acclaim and was nominated for the South African Writers' Association Book of the Decade award in 1960.

In 1965 he became editor of the popular Sporting Affairs Magazine and remained in the post until 1976. His sports writing was particularly notable as he continued to write about black athletes at a time when much of the South African media was encouraged to ignore non-white sportsmen and political figures.

He has also written many academic papers focusing on the cultural context of South Africa.

Notably he used different names to distinguish his sports and academic work. His name generally appears as B. R. Keenan on his academic material, while his boxing and sports writing was published under the name Ronan Keenan.

Keenan continued to write about boxing and current affairs for numerous online publications until his death. He died in Cape Town on January 12, 2007.

== Works ==
- Keenan, R. B., Science and the University. 1975 ISBN 0-231-02932-2
- Keenan, R. B. E., Boxing's Greatest Wars. 1956 Pretoria Press
