= Luis Alberto Pérez =

Nicaraguan boxer

Personal information
- Nickname: El Demoledor ("The Demolisher")
- Born: Luis Alberto Sanchez Pérez; April 6, 1978 (age 48) Managua, Nicaragua
- Height: 5 ft 5 1/2 in (166 cm)
- Weight: Super flyweight; Bantamweight; Super bantamweight

Boxing career
- Reach: 66 1/2 in (169 cm)
- Stance: Southpaw

Boxing record
- Total fights: 33
- Wins: 27
- Win by KO: 17
- Losses: 5
- Draws: 1

Luís Alberto Pérez (born April 6, 1978) is a Nicaraguan former professional boxer who competed from 1996 to 2014. He held world championships in two weight divisions, including the International Boxing Federation (IBF) super flyweight title from 2003 to 2006, and the IBF bantamweight title in 2007. He also challenged for the WBA super bantamweight interim title in 2008.

== Professional career ==
Pérez competed in 33 professional bouts, finishing with a final record of 27 wins (17 by knockout), 5 losses, and 1 draw. He won two IBF world titles, making three successful defenses of the super flyweight title before being stripped of the title for failing to make weight for one of his planned defenses. He won the bantamweight title in 2007, but lost it in his first defense to Joseph Agbeko.

== Professional boxing record ==
33 fights	27 wins	5 losses
By knockout	17	2
By decision	10	2
By disqualification	0	1
Draws	1	

No.	Result	Record	Opponent	Type	Round, time	Date	Location	Notes
33	Draw	27–5–1	Byron Uriarte	MD	8	14 Jun 2014	Polideportivo Miguel Obando y Bravo, La Libertad, Nicaragua	
32	Win	27–5	David Reyes	UD	6	31 Mar 2012	Casino Princess, Managua, Nicaragua	
31	Loss	26–5	A. J. Banal	DQ	7 (10), 1:46	30 Oct 2010	Waterfront Cebu City Hotel & Casino, Cebu City, Philippines	Pérez disqualified for hitting during a break
30	Win	26–4	Freddy Madrigal	TKO	2 (6), 2:30	29 May 2010	Gimnasio de Nindiri, Masaya, Nicaragua	
29	Loss	25–4	Sergio Gomez	TKO	4 (8), 2:40	17 Oct 2009	Gimanasio Polideportivo Espana, Managua, Nicaragua	
28	Loss	25–3	Ricardo Cordoba	UD	12	18 Sep 2008	Centro de Convenciones Figali, Panama City, Panama	For vacant WBA interim super bantamweight title
27	Loss	25–2	Joseph Agbeko	RTD	7 (12), 3:00	29 Sep 2007	ARCO Arena, Sacramento, California, U.S.	Lost IBF bantamweight title
26	Win	25–1	Genaro García	TKO	7 (12), 1:39	7 Jul 2007	Harbour Yard Arena, Bridgeport, Connecticut, U.S.	Won vacant IBF bantamweight title
25	Win	24–1	Dimitri Kirilov	SD	12	6 May 2006	DCU Center, Worcester, Massachusetts, U.S.	Retained IBF super flyweight title
24	Win	23–1	Luis Bolano	TKO	6 (12), 2:46	30 Apr 2005	Madison Square Garden, New York City, New York, U.S.	Retained IBF super flyweight title
23	Win	22–1	Félix Machado	UD	12	13 Dec 2003	Boardwalk Hall, Atlantic City, New Jersey, U.S.	Retained IBF super flyweight title
22	Win	21–1	Félix Machado	SD	12	4 Jan 2003	D.C. Armory, Washington, D.C., U.S.	Won IBF super flyweight title
21	Win	20–1	Roberto Bonilla	KO	1 (12), 2:10	5 Jul 2002	Hotel Intercontinental, Managua, Nicaragua	Retained WBA Fedelatin super flyweight title
20	Win	19–1	Edison Torres	UD	12	27 Oct 2001	Managua, Nicaragua	Retained WBA Fedelatin super flyweight title
19	Win	18–1	Edison Torres	SD	12	14 Jul 2001	Gimansio Alexis Argüello, Managua, Nicaragua	Won vacant WBA Fedelatin super flyweight title
18	Win	17–1	Moises Castro	UD	10	24 Feb 2001	Gimansio Alexis Argüello, Managua, Nicaragua	
17	Win	16–1	Eric Jimenez	KO	1 (10)	8 Dec 2000	Hotel Intercontinental, Managua, Nicaragua	
16	Loss	15–1	Vernie Torres	UD	12	7 Sep 2000	Grand Casino, Gulfport, Mississippi, U.S.	For WBO Inter-Continental super flyweight title
15	Win	15–0	Ruben Diaz	UD	12	11 Mar 2000	Gimanasio Polideportivo Espana, Managua, Nicaragua	Won vacant WBA Fedecentro super flyweight title
14	Win	14–0	Ulises Corona	TKO	5 (10)	6 Nov 1999	Gimansio Alexis Argüello, Managua, Nicaragua	
13	Win	13–0	Justo Almazan	TKO	5 (10)	3 Jul 1999	Managua, Nicaragua	
12	Win	12–0	Jose Gamez	PTS	10	26 Mar 1999	Managua, Nicaragua	
11	Win	11–0	Justo Zuniga	KO	1	13 Feb 1999	Gimansio Alexis Argüello, Managua, Nicaragua	
10	Win	10–0	Sergio Gonzalez	KO	4 (10)	11 Dec 1998	Managua, Nicaragua	
9	Win	9–0	Julio Blandon	PTS	10	30 Oct 1998	Managua, Nicaragua	
8	Win	8–0	Leon Salazar	TKO	4 (10)	3 Jul 1998	Gimansio Alexis Argüello, Managua, Nicaragua	
7	Win	7–0	Leandro Mendoza	KO	3 (10)	29 May 1998	Managua, Nicaragua	
6	Win	6–0	Jairo Paramo	TKO	5 (10)	13 Feb 1998	Managua, Nicaragua	
5	Win	5–0	Edwin Vargas	TKO	3 (8)	5 Aug 1997	Managua, Nicaragua	
4	Win	4–0	Marvin Solis	TKO	3 (8)	4 Jul 1997	Managua, Nicaragua	
3	Win	3–0	Julio Blandon	TKO	1 (8)	19 Apr 1997	Managua, Nicaragua	
2	Win	2–0	Reynaldo Tellez	TKO	1 (8)	1 Mar 1997	Managua, Nicaragua	
1	Win	1–0	Daniel Rosales	TKO	3 (6)	2 Nov 1996	Managua, Nicaragua	

== Titles in boxing ==
=== Major world titles ===
- IBF super flyweight champion (115 lbs)
- IBF bantamweight champion (118 lbs)

=== Regional/International titles ===
- WBA Fedecentro super flyweight champion (115 lbs)
- WBA Fedelatin super flyweight champion (115 lbs)

Sporting positions
Regional boxing titles
Vacant Title last held by Cuauhtemoc Gomez	WBA Fedecentro super flyweight champion 11 March 2000 – December 2000; Vacated	Vacant Title next held by Miguel Del Valle
Vacant Title last held by Jorge Otero	WBA Fedelatin super flyweight champion 14 July 2001 – 4 January 2003; Won IBF world title	Vacant Title next held by Alexander Muñoz
World boxing titles
Preceded by Félix Machado	IBF super flyweight champion 4 January 2003 – 3 November 2006; Stripped	Vacant Title next held by Dimitri Kirilov
Vacant Title last held by Rafael Márquez	IBF bantamweight champion 7 July 2007 – 29 September 2007	Succeeded by Joseph Agbeko
