= Vic Darchinyan =

Armenian boxer (born 1976)

Vic Darchinyan Վախթանգ Դարչինյան
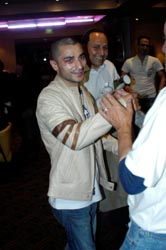
- Darchinyan in 2011

Personal information
- Nickname: The Raging Bull
- Born: Vakhtang Darchinyan; 7 January 1976 (age 50) Vanadzor, Armenian SSR, Soviet Union
- Height: 1.66 m (5 ft 5 in)
- Weight: Flyweight; Super flyweight; Bantamweight; Super bantamweight; Featherweight

Boxing career
- Reach: 164 cm (65 in)
- Stance: Southpaw

Boxing record
- Total fights: 53
- Wins: 43
- Win by KO: 32
- Losses: 9
- Draws: 1
Medal record
Men's amateur boxing
Representing Armenia
European Championships
Bronze medal – third place	1998 Minsk	Flyweight
Goodwill Games
Bronze medal – third place	1998 New York	Flyweight

Vakhtang "Vic" Darchinyan (Armenian: Վախթանգ Դարչինյան; born 7 January 1976) is an Armenian former professional boxer who competed from 2000 to 2017. He held multiple world championships in two weight classes, including the International Boxing Federation (IBF) flyweight title from 2004 to 2007, and the unified (Note: World Boxing Association (WBA) (Undisputed version, later Unified version), World Boxing Council (WBC), and International Boxing Federation (IBF) titles.) super-flyweight championship between 2008 and 2010. He also held the lineal super-flyweight title from 2009 to 2011, and a record four International Boxing Organization (IBO) titles at flyweight, super-flyweight, and twice at bantamweight between 2005 and 2011. A southpaw with a highly unique fighting style and formidable punching power, Darchinyan became the first Armenian boxer to win a world title in 2004.

== Early life ==
Darchinyan was born on 7 January 1976, in Vanadzor, Armenia. His father, Ruben Darchinyan, was an Olympic wrestling coach for Armenia. Ruben's name can sometimes be seen on Vic's boxing trunks. Vic has a sister named Liana.

Vic wanted to become a boxer at the age of 5 and dreamed of becoming a world champion in the professionals. His father told him there was no professional boxing in Armenia (or any Soviet countries; this changed when the Union fell in 1991) and instead wanted Vic to follow in his footsteps and take up wrestling. Vic also wrestled as a kid, but always continued to say he would become a world champion someday. He eventually left wrestling in pursuit of his dream to become a world boxing champion.

Darchinyan and his wife Olga, an English teacher, met near an Opera House in Sydney, Australia in 2001. They got married a year later. In 2007, the couple had a son named Ruben II.

== Amateur career ==
Vic began boxing at the age of 8 within the community of Vanadzor, where boxing was very popular. He was trained by the experienced Vazgen Badalyan. Darchinyan's amateur career record was 158–18 with 105 knockouts. Vic fought in many different countries and participated for Armenia in the 2000 Olympic Games in Sydney, Australia. He went to the third round in the 112 lb division before losing against Bulat Jumadilov of Kazakhstan. Darchinyan moved to Australia after competing in the Olympics and eventually became an Australian citizen later in the same year. Darchinyan turned pro at the age of 24 on 3 November 2000.

Vic Darchinyan won a bronze medal at the 1998 European Amateur Boxing Championships in Minsk. He also won a bronze medal at the 1998 Goodwill Games. In the same year, Darchinyan won a bronze medal at the 1998 Boxing World Cup.

=== Olympic results ===
- Defeated opponent
- Defeated Ilfat Ryazapov (Russia) 20–11
- Lost to Bulat Jumadilov (Kazakhstan) 8–15

== Professional career ==
=== Flyweight ===
Vic is promoted by Gary Shaw Promotions. From November 2000 to December 2004, Vic built up a record of 21–0 (16 ko's) and captured the Australian, Oceanic and Pan Pacific flyweight titles. After knocking out former 2-division world champion Wandee Singwancha in an IBF eliminator on 13 June 2003, he earned the IBF #1 mandatory ranking.

=== IBF champion ===
He won his IBF title on 16 December 2004 in his first fight in the United States, defeating respected then-undefeated champion Irene Pacheco of Colombia, via 11th round technical knock-out. Pacheco had held the title for over 5 years. Returning to Australia, his first title defense was on 27 March 2005 against long time contender and IBO belt holder, Mzukisi Sikali, in a crowd-pleasing brawl. By the 8th round, Sikali took a combination body and head shots and turned away in a 'No Mas' fashion, prompting referee Pete Podgorski to step in and wave it off.

Attempting to secure a fight in the US, Vic took a stay-busy fight on 24 August 2005 defending his title against fringe contender Jair Jimenez, whom he floored him in round 4. The referee stopped fight in the 5th after Jimenez started to walk away from the fight. Returning to the USA headlining on ShoBox: The New Generation, his third title defense was against Filipino contender Diosdado Gabi on 3 March 2006. Vic knocked him out with a single straight left in the 8th round.

Three months later, returning to Showtime after the hotly contested Jose Luis Castillo Vs Diego Corrales rubber match fell through, Vic's defense against then-undefeated Mexican contender Luis Maldonado was moved to the main event. He stopped the tough Mexican in the 8th round. In his fifth title defense, Vic faced Glenn Donaire on 7 October 2006. Glenn gave up during the fight, claiming Vic broke his jaw in the 6th round from an alleged elbow attack. Replays showed no evidence of an elbow. Darchinyan's camp, though winners by technical decision, have always claimed this should have been a legitimate knockout.

In his sixth title defense, Darchinyan faced former light flyweight champion Victor Burgos on 3 March 2007. Vic knocked Burgos down in the second round and stopped him in the twelfth round. Victor later underwent surgery to remove a blood clot from his brain. Burgos was put into a medically induced coma and made a full recovery. However, he was not able to fight again.

On 7 July 2007, Darchinyan suffered his first defeat from Nonito Donaire, younger brother of Glenn Donaire, in a title bout via TKO. Darchinyan was caught with a left hook which floored him, in an exchange with Donaire in the fifth round. Darchinyan managed to get up but immediately fell on the ropes and the referee stopped the fight. Darchinyan lost the IBF and IBO flyweight titles to Donaire. The match was eventually awarded Knockout of the Year and Upset of the Year by Ring Magazine.

=== Super-flyweight ===
Darchinyan returned three months later and won the vacant IBO super flyweight title by stopping Filipino veteran Federico Catubay. Catubay was knocked down in round 7 and 11. Vic decided to outbox and outpunch his larger opponent and finally finished him off in round 12. He voluntarily relinquished the IBO title prior to fighting in an IBF eliminator.

On 2 February 2008, Darchinyan fought Z Gorres to a controversial split draw at the Waterfront Hotel in Cebu City, Philippines in an IBF Super Flyweight Eliminator where the winner would challenge the champion Dimitri Kirilov. The bout began with a knockdown for Darchinyan in the first round, which appeared to be a slip by Gorres when replayed. The crowd was upset with the referee calling the slip a knockdown and began to pelt the ring with bottles of water, coins and other objects. Gorres came back in the second round to floor Darchinyan with a left hand, but Darchinyan beat the count, which again prompted some arena fans to pelt the ring with objects. Gorres was knocked down in the fifth round, but the referee ruled it a slip. A clash of heads in the sixth round opened up a bad gash on Gorres. In the ninth round, Darchinyan connected with a right hand, sending Gorres down for the second time in the fight. Gorres would fall to the canvas on at least three other occasions in the final three rounds, with the referee ruling all of them slips. The final scores were 113–112 for Gorres, 114–112 for Darchinyan, and 113–113 for the draw. Darchinyan's promoter, Gary Shaw, filed an official protest with the IBF over the officiating of the bout.

Despite the draw, Darchinyan earned the right to take on Kirilov for being higher in the ratings and willing to accept the fight.

=== Second world title ===
Six months later, Darchinyan was back in what most experts called a career-best performance, taking on IBF super flyweight champion Dimitri Kirilov on 2 August 2008 at the Emerald Queen Casino in Tacoma Washington. Darchinyan dominated from the opening bell and showed an improvement in speed and boxing skill. He eventually caught Kirilov in round 5, dropping him twice en route to a round KO. Darchinyan was ahead 40–36 on all three judges' scorecards.

=== Super-flyweight ===
==== Unified WBA and WBC champion ====
On 1 November 2008, Darchinyan fought WBC and WBA super flyweight champion Cristian Mijares at the Home Depot Center in Carson, California. Darchinyan was the aggressor from the outset, getting inside with big punches, including a left uppercut that knocked Mijares down in the first round. With his unorthodox crouching style, Darchinyan seemed to confuse Mijares, who was often content to counterpunch rather than attack. Mijares connected with just one combination the entire fight, that during a brief span of the fifth round. Darchinyan, however, was unhurt and unfazed. In the ninth round, Darchinyan caught Mijares with a right hand. Then as Mijares backed away, Darchinyan lunged and landed a straight left hand that knocked out Mijares. Darchinyan became the first man in history to unify the titles in the weight class.

Darchinyan successfully defended his unified WBC, WBA, IBF and lineal titles on 7 February 2009 against multiple time champion Jorge Arce, winning by TKO in the 11th round. The early rounds were somewhat competitive, but as each round progressed, Darchinyan asserted his dominance more and more. In the 11th round, the doctor stopped the bout because Arce was severely cut on both eyes.

On 12 December 2009, having vacated his IBF belt in an unsuccessful attempt to move up to bantamweight, Darchinyan successfully defended his unified WBC, WBA and lineal titles against interim champion Tomás Rojas, winning by KO in the 2nd round. Rojas would go on to capture the WBC belt shortly after Vic vacated it.

On 6 March 2010, Darchinyan successfully defended his unified WBC and WBA titles against Rodrigo Guerrero, winning a unanimous decision. Guerrero would go on to capture the IBF belt in 2011.

In June 2009, Darchinyan was rated the No. 8 best pound for pound boxer in the world by The Ring.

=== Bantamweight ===
While retaining his WBC and WBA super flyweight belts, Darchinyan vacated his IBF belt in order to move up to bantamweight to fight IBF champion Joseph Agbeko in Sunrise, Florida on 11 July 2009. He lost a unanimous decision in a fight he looked almost too overly aggressive in and was picked at with straight right hands. However, Agbeko also threw multiple headbutts, one of which opened a cut by Darchinyan's right eye in the tenth round. The referee warned Agbeko about headbutting in the twelfth round but never deducted any points. Two judges scored the bout 114–113 for Agbeko and the third had it 116–111 for Agbeko. Despite the defeat at bantamweight, Darchinyan was still recognized as super flyweight champion by both the WBC and WBA.

On 20 May 2010, Darchinyan won the vacant IBO bantamweight title with a one-sided unanimous decision victory in his adopted land of Australia over Eric Barcelona. Barcelona was knocked down twice in the fifth round, once in the eleventh round and was docked a point in each the sixth and twelfth rounds.

Following the win, it was soon announced that Darchinyan would take part in Showtime's four man bantamweight tournament, along with Joseph Agbeko, Abner Mares and IBF bantamweight champion Yonnhy Pérez. Darchinyan lost in the semi-finals on 11 December 2010 against México's Mares via controversial split decision. Darchinyan dominated Mares in first half of the fight. Mares was knocked down once in the second round and was docked a point in the fourth round for low blows. Mares had been throwing dirty punches the entire fight, however, and continued to do so, being warned 16 more times after the point deduction. The referee continued to turn a blind eye to Mares' low blows and, as a result, Mares started winning rounds. Darchinyan was knocked down once in the seventh round out of pain from low blows. When the win was announced for Mares, the audience seemed surprised, as many felt Darchinyan had won this fight.

In the third-place match on 23 April 2011, Darchinyan rocked Perez in round one, knocked him down in round two and was in command all the way. Perez had his moments but wasn't able to hold off Darchinyan's aggression. The bout ended when Perez was cut by an accidental headbutt at 1:07 of round five. Scores were 50–44 on all cards. Darchinyan dedicated his victory to the lives lost in the 1915 Armenian genocide, as well as the Australians that perished in Anzac Day for the following day. On 24 April, one day after his fight, he joined thousands of Armenian Americans on the streets of Los Angeles in a march to commemorate the Genocide. Vic was later honored at the Armenian National Committee of America Annual Banquet on 26 November. He was rated #1 contender by the WBA shortly after the fight.

On 3 September 2011, for a homecoming bout in Armenia, Vic battered tough African contender Evans Mbamba (18–2, 9 KOs) for twelve one-sided rounds (Darchinyan won 120–107 on two cards and 119–107 on the third), maintaining the mandatory WBA No. 1 position and gaining WBO No. 1 spot shortly after. Mbamba was knocked down once in the first round.

In a bantamweight double header (an extension of Showtime's Bantamweight Tournament), Vic faced WBA (Super) champion Anselmo Moreno on 3 December 2011 at the Honda Center in Anaheim, California. Moreno took advantage of his longer reach and height by fighting Darchinyan from the outside while ducking and weaving the whole fight. Darchinyan was docked one point in round four for throwing Moreno to the ground. Moreno hit Darchinyan with a low blow and was not docked a point, even though the referee gave Darchinyan time to recuperate. The three judges scored a lopsided unanimous decision win to Moreno.

On 6 April 2012, Darchinyan lost to WBC bantamweight champion Shinsuke Yamanaka in Yamanaka's home country of Japan. The fight was not without controversy. Darchinyan was slightly ahead on one card and the other two were even after the fourth round. In the fourth, a clash of heads opened a bloody cut on Darchinyan's eyebrow and nose. Yamanaka hit Darchinyan with an elbow on the same eyebrow in round five, severing the cut. The referee was not in line of sight to see this. Blood was pouring more rapidly out of Darchinyan's eyebrow afterward and the ringside doctor examined it. A fight would usually be stopped and given a technical decision at this point, but the cut was controversially ruled to have been caused by a punch by the ringside doctor, who examined the cut in the sixth round, when Darchinyan was ahead on points. Darchinyan, fighting with blood in his eyes for the rest of the fight, lost via decision. The headbutt and elbow thrown by Yamanaka had raised much controversy, as Darchinyan was winning the fight beforehand and his performance seemed to slow down as consequence. The result is currently being protested by Team Darchinyan with photographic proof Yamanaka used an illegal headbutt and elbow.

=== Super-bantamweight ===
Darchinyan moved up in weight class afterwards and, on 29 September 2012, defeated Luis Del Valle to win the vacant NABF super bantamweight title.

A rematch between Vic Darchinyan and Nonito Donaire took place on 9 November 2013. The 37-year-old Darchinyan gave the 30-year-old Donaire a lot more trouble than was expected, as this was intended to be an easy bounce-back fight for Donaire who was coming off his first loss in over a decade. Darchinyan fought a smarter fight and confused a sluggish Donaire for much of the first 8 rounds, but in the 9th round was dropped and got up to be finished by TKO. At the time of the stoppage, Darchinyan was leading on the scorecards: 78–74, 78–74, and 76–76.

=== Featherweight ===
Afterwards, Darchinyan fought up another weight class and challenged Nicholas Walters for his WBA featherweight title on 31 May 2014 in Macau. The fight went five rounds before Darchinyan was knocked out. Darchinyan won his next fight against Juan Jimenez by TKO in the 9th round. The bout took place on 7 February 2015 in Mexico, the seventh country Darchinyan had fought in. He fought WBA (Regular) featherweight titleholder Jesús Cuellar on 6 June 2015 and lost by 8th-round TKO. Two more knock out victories against Prayoot Yaijam and Cris Paulino saw Darchinyan finishing 2015 by winning the vacant WBC–ABCO super bantamweight title.

In 2016, he was knocked out in two rounds by journeyman Sergio Frias and did not fight again that year.

After taking some time off to re-evaluate, Darchinyan knocked out Pakpoom Hammarach in one round on 10 March 2017. The fight was taken by Darchinyan not for the money, but to see if he still had the hunger and desire to continue his boxing career. Taking place in Perth, this would be his last fight in Australia. He has confirmed his next fight will be his last and expressed interest in one more big fight against Evgeny Gradovich in Russia or Carl Frampton in England.

== Outside boxing ==
On 21 September 2008, Darchinyan and fellow boxer Arthur Abraham were honored by Armenian President Serge Sargsyan during a 20th anniversary celebration of the nation's independence. Both men were awarded with medals "For the great services for Armenia" of the first degree.

== Professional boxing record ==
53 fights	43 wins	9 losses
By knockout	32	5
By decision	11	4
Draws	1	

No.	Result	Record	Opponent	Type	Round, time	Date	Location	Notes
53	Win	43–9–1	Pakpoom Hammarach	KO	1 (6), 2:59	10 Mar 2017	Perry Park, Brisbane, Australia	
52	Loss	42–9–1	Sergio Frias	KO	2 (8), 2:14	16 Jul 2016	Legacy Arena, Birmingham, Alabama, US	
51	Win	42–8–1	Cris Paulino	RTD	2 (10), 3:00	12 Dec 2015	Perry Park, Brisbane, Australia	Won vacant WBC–ABCO super-bantamweight title
50	Win	41–8–1	Prayoot Yaijam	TKO	2 (10), 1:08	3 Oct 2015	Perry Park, Brisbane, Australia	
49	Loss	40–8–1	Jesús Cuellar	TKO	8 (12), 1:04	6 Jun 2015	StubHub Center, Carson, California, US	For WBA (Regular) featherweight title
48	Win	40–7–1	Juan Jiménez	TKO	9 (12), 2:48	7 Feb 2015	Domo del Palacio Municipal, Chetumal, Mexico	
47	Loss	39–7–1	Nicholas Walters	KO	5 (12), 2:22	31 May 2014	Cotai Arena, Macau, SAR	For WBA (Regular) featherweight title
46	Loss	39–6–1	Nonito Donaire	TKO	9 (10), 2:06	9 Nov 2013	American Bank Center, Corpus Christi, Texas, US	
45	Win	39–5–1	Javier Gallo	TKO	4 (10), 0:26	12 May 2013	Uni-Trade Stadium, Laredo, Texas, US	
44	Win	38–5–1	Luis Del Valle	UD	10	29 Sep 2012	Foxwoods Resort Casino, Ledyard, Connecticut, US	Won vacant NABF super-bantamweight title
43	Loss	37–5–1	Shinsuke Yamanaka	UD	12	6 Apr 2012	International Forum, Tokyo, Japan	For WBC bantamweight title
42	Loss	37–4–1	Anselmo Moreno	UD	12	3 Dec 2011	Honda Center, Anaheim, California, US	Lost IBO bantamweight title; For WBA (Super) bantamweight title
41	Win	37–3–1	Evans Mbamba	UD	12	3 Sep 2011	Karen Demirchyan Complex, Yerevan, Armenia	Retained IBO bantamweight title
40	Win	36–3–1	Yonnhy Pérez	TD	5 (12), 1:07	23 Apr 2011	Nokia Theatre L.A. Live, Los Angeles, California, US	Won vacant IBO bantamweight title; Unanimous TD: Pérez cut from an accidental head clash
39	Loss	35–3–1	Abner Mares	SD	12	11 Dec 2010	Emerald Queen Casino, Tacoma, Washington, US	Lost IBO bantamweight title; For vacant WBC Silver bantamweight title
38	Win	35–2–1	Eric Barcelona	UD	12	20 May 2010	Parramatta Leagues Club, Sydney, Australia	Won vacant IBO bantamweight title
37	Win	34–2–1	Rodrigo Guerrero	UD	12	6 Mar 2010	Agua Caliente Casino Resort Spa, Rancho Mirage, California, US	Retained WBA (Unified) and WBC super-flyweight titles
36	Win	33–2–1	Tomás Rojas	KO	2 (12), 2:54	12 Dec 2009	Agua Caliente Casino Resort Spa, Rancho Mirage, California, US	Retained WBA (Unified) and WBC super-flyweight titles
35	Loss	32–2–1	Joseph Agbeko	UD	12	11 Jul 2009	BankAtlantic Center, Sunrise, Florida, US	For IBF bantamweight title
34	Win	32–1–1	Jorge Arce	RTD	11 (12), 3:00	7 Feb 2009	Honda Center, Anaheim, California, US	Retained WBA (Undisputed), WBC, and IBF super-flyweight titles
33	Win	31–1–1	Cristian Mijares	KO	9 (12), 3:00	1 Nov 2008	Home Depot Center, Carson, California, US	Retained IBF super-flyweight title; Won WBA (Undisputed) and WBC super-flyweight titles
32	Win	30–1–1	Dimitri Kirilov	KO	5 (12), 1:05	2 Aug 2008	Emerald Queen Casino, Tacoma, Washington, US	Won IBF super-flyweight title
31	Draw	29–1–1	Z Gorres	SD	12	2 Feb 2008	Waterfront Hotel & Casino, Cebu City, Philippines	
30	Win	29–1	Federico Catubay	TKO	12 (12), 2:03	20 Oct 2007	Auburn RSL Club, Sydney, Australia	Won vacant IBO and IBF Australasian super-flyweight titles
29	Loss	28–1	Nonito Donaire	TKO	5 (12), 1:38	7 Jul 2007	The Arena at Harbor Yard, Bridgeport, Connecticut, US	Lost IBF and IBO flyweight titles
28	Win	28–0	Victor Burgos	TKO	12 (12), 1:27	3 Mar 2007	Home Depot Center, Carson, California, US	Retained IBF and IBO flyweight titles
27	Win	27–0	Glenn Donaire	TD	6 (12), 1:27	7 Oct 2006	Mandalay Bay Events Center, Paradise, Nevada, US	Retained IBF and IBO flyweight titles; Unanimous TD: Donaire unable to continue after an accidental elbow
26	Win	26–0	Luis Maldonado	TKO	8 (12), 1:38	3 Jun 2006	Thomas & Mack Center, Paradise, Nevada, US	Retained IBF and IBO flyweight titles
25	Win	25–0	Diosdado Gabi	TKO	8 (12), 2:42	3 Mar 2006	Chumash Casino Resort, Santa Ynez, California, US	Retained IBF and IBO flyweight titles
24	Win	24–0	Jair Jimenez	TKO	5 (12), 2:23	24 Aug 2005	Entertainment Centre, Sydney, Australia	Retained IBF and IBO flyweight titles
23	Win	23–0	Mzukisi Sikali	TKO	8 (12), 2:28	27 Mar 2005	State Sports Centre, Sydney, Australia	Retained IBF flyweight title; Won IBO flyweight title
22	Win	22–0	Irene Pacheco	TKO	11 (12), 0:44	16 Dec 2004	Hard Rock Live, Hollywood, Florida, US	Won IBF flyweight title
21	Win	21–0	Falazona Fidal	TKO	2 (8)	16 Apr 2004	Dandenong Stadium, Melbourne, Australia	
20	Win	20–0	Wandee Singwancha	KO	4 (12)	12 Dec 2003	Badgery's Pavilion, Sydney, Australia	
19	Win	19–0	Dozer Tobing	KO	1 (10)	3 Oct 2003	Badgery's Pavilion, Sydney, Australia	
18	Win	18–0	Alejandro Montiel	UD	10	8 Aug 2003	Panthers World of Entertainment, Penrith, Australia	
17	Win	17–0	Wandee Singwancha	TKO	4 (12)	13 Jun 2003	Auburn RSL Club, Sydney, Australia	Retained IBF Pan Pacific flyweight title
16	Win	16–0	Raul Eliseo Medina	TD	8 (12)	11 Apr 2003	Panthers World of Entertainment, Penrith, Australia	Retained IBF Pan Pacific flyweight title; Medina cut from an accidental head clash
15	Win	15–0	Phises Vor Surapol	TKO	3 (12), 2:35	13 Dec 2002	Rosehill Gardens Racecourse, Sydney, Australia	Retained IBF Pan Pacific flyweight title
14	Win	14–0	Albert Resley	TKO	3 (8)	9 Nov 2002	Challenge Stadium, Perth, Australia	
13	Win	13–0	Hamadani Tomagola	KO	4	25 Oct 2002	Star City Casino, Sydney, Australia	
12	Win	12–0	Panomdej Ohyuthanakorn	TKO	4 (12)	2 Aug 2002	Le Montage, Sydney, Australia	Won vacant IBF Pan Pacific flyweight title
11	Win	11–0	Farzan Ali Jr.	RTD	6 (12)	14 Jun 2002	Enmore Theatre, Sydney, Australia	Won vacant Oceanic Boxing Association bantamweight title
10	Win	10–0	Prasob Nookliang	KO	2 (8)	19 Apr 2002	Le Montage, Sydney, Australia	
9	Win	9–0	Win Nationman	KO	3 (8)	8 Feb 2002	Le Montage, Sydney, Australia	
8	Win	8–0	Puna Eminent	KO	3 (8), 1:11	16 Nov 2001	Nineveh Sports Club, Sydney, Australia	
7	Win	7–0	Sande Kizito	TKO	7 (12)	18 Oct 2001	Star City Casino, Sydney, Australia	Won vacant Australian flyweight title
6	Win	6–0	Prasob Nookliang	TKO	6 (8)	31 Aug 2001	Sydney Roosters, Sydney, Australia	
5	Win	5–0	David Picknell	KO	3	3 Aug 2001	The Bellevue Hotel, Sydney, Australia	
4	Win	4–0	Sande Kizito	PTS	6	29 Jun 2001	The Bellevue Hotel, Sydney, Australia	
3	Win	3–0	Selvio Glinoco	TKO	2 (6)	20 Apr 2001	Le Montage, Sydney, Australia	
2	Win	2–0	Hichem Blida	PTS	4	9 Feb 2001	Le Montage, Sydney, Australia	
1	Win	1–0	Sande Kizito	PTS	6	3 Nov 2000	Star City Casino, Sydney, Australia	

== Titles in boxing ==
=== Major world titles ===
- IBF flyweight champion (112 lbs)
- WBA (Unified and Undisputed) super flyweight champion (Note: Was the primary champion throughout his entire reign.) (115 lbs)
- WBC super flyweight champion (115 lbs)
- IBF super flyweight champion (115 lbs)

=== Minor world titles ===
- IBO flyweight champion (112 lbs)
- IBO super flyweight champion (115 lbs)
- IBO bantamweight champion (118 lbs) (2×)

=== Regional/International titles ===
- IBF Pan Pacific flyweight champion (112 lbs)
- Australian flyweight champion (112 lbs)
- IBF Australasian super flyweight champion (115 lbs)
- Oceanic Boxing Association bantamweight champion (118 lbs)
- NABF super bantamweight champion (122 lbs)
- ABCO super bantamweight champion (122 lbs)

=== Honorary titles ===
- WBC Emeritus Champion

== See also ==
- List of flyweight boxing champions
- List of super-flyweight boxing champions
- List of WBA world champions
- List of WBC world champions
- List of IBF world champions
- List of WBO world champions

== Notes ==
Sporting positions
Regional boxing titles
New title	IBF Pan Pacific flyweight champion 2 August 2002 – August 2003; Vacated	Vacant Title next held by Angky Angkotta
New title	IBF Australasian super-flyweight champion 20 October 2007 – May 2010; Vacated	Title discontinued
Vacant Title last held by Efrain Esquivias Jr.	NABF super-bantamweight champion 29 September 2012 – May 2013; Vacated	Vacant Title next held by Nonito Donaire
Vacant Title last held by Argie Toquero	WBC–ABCO super-bantamweight champion 29 September 2012 – July 2016; Vacated	Vacant
Minor world boxing titles
Preceded by Mzukisi Sikali	IBO flyweight champion 27 March 2005 – 7 July 2007	Succeeded by Nonito Donaire
Vacant Title last held by Mbwana Matumla	IBO super-flyweight champion 20 October 2007 – February 2008; Vacated	Vacant Title next held by Zolile Mbityi
Vacant Title last held by Simpiwe Vetyeka	IBO bantamweight champion 20 May 2010 – 11 December 2010	Succeeded by Abner Mares
Vacant Title last held by Abner Mares	IBO bantamweight champion 23 April 2011 – 3 December 2011	Succeeded by Anselmo Moreno
Major world boxing titles
Preceded by Irene Pacheco	IBF flyweight champion 16 December 2004 – 7 July 2007	Succeeded by Nonito Donaire
Preceded by Dimitri Kirilov	IBF super-flyweight champion 2 August 2008 – 28 July 2009; Vacated	Vacant Title next held by Simphiwe Nongqayi
Preceded by Cristian Mijares	WBA super-flyweight champion Super title 1 November 2008 – 15 October 2010; Vacated	Vacant
Preceded by Cristian Mijares	WBC super-flyweight champion 1 November 2008 – 3 August 2010; Status changed	Vacant Title next held by Tomás Rojas
