= Julio Gamboa =

Nicaraguan boxer (born 1971)

Personal information
- Nickname: Yambito
- Nationality: (Nicaragua) Nicaraguan
- Born: Julio Gamboa; December 15, 1971 (age 54) Nicaragua
- Height: 5 ft 6 in (1.68 m)
- Weight: Lightweight

Boxing career
- Reach: 68 in (173 cm)
- Stance: Orthodox

Boxing record
- Total fights: 43
- Wins: 28
- Win by KO: 17
- Losses: 13
- Draws: 2
- No contests: 0

Julio Gamboa (born December 15, 1971, in Nicaragua) is a Nicaraguan lightweight boxer. He currently resides in León, Nicaragua.

== See also ==
- List of IBF world champions
