= List of deaths due to injuries sustained in boxing =

In 1995, it was estimated that approximately 500 boxers had died from boxing injuries since the introduction of the Marquess of Queensberry Rules in 1884.

The list is incomplete; many other boxers not listed here have died as a consequence of injuries sustained in a contest.

Date of fight	Victim	Opponent	Details
14 Dec 1894	(United States) Andy Bowen	(United States) Kid Lavigne	27-year-old Bowen hit his head on the wooden canvas when Lavigne knocked him down in the 18th round. Bowen never regained consciousness and died the following morning.
6 Dec 1897	(United Kingdom) Walter Croot	(United States) Jimmy Barry	Croot never regained consciousness and died the following day from a brain injury. Charged with manslaughter, Barry was exonerated when it was determined that Croot had died from a fractured skull sustained when his head hit the unpadded floor, made of wood.
29 April 1910	(United States) Tommy McCarthy	(United Kingdom) Owen Moran	McCarthy sustained a fractured skull and died the next morning.
24 May 1913	(United States) Luther McCarty	Arthur Pelkey	Pelkey was arrested and changed with manslaughter but was later absolved of blame.
5 Feb 1923	(United States) Andy Thomas	(United States) Johnny Clinton	Knocked out and did not regain consciousness even though his heart was still beating and died the next morning.
12 Jun 1923	(France) Jean-Baptiste Rampignon	(France) André Gleizes	Rampignon slipped into a coma after a 15-round points loss in a bout for the French flyweight championship and died the following day.
11 Jan 1924	(United States) Frankie Jerome	(United States) Bud Taylor	Jerome died two days following a twelfth round stoppage loss.
19 Apr 1926	(Philippines) Clever Sencio	(United States) Bud Taylor	Sencio died just two hours after a decision loss. This was the second ring tragedy that involved Bud Taylor.
1 May 1927	(United States) Steve Adams	(United States) Sammy Mandell	Adams died in the ring after collapsing in the second round in a bout with Sammy Mandell. An autopsy showed that Adams died of a broken neck.
1 Jun 1928	(United Kingdom) Tosh Powell	(United Kingdom) Billy Housego	20-year-old Welsh boxer Powell collapsed during the third round of his bout with London fighter Housego. Powell was taken to the Liverpool Royal Infirmary, where he died of a brain hemorrhage on 2 June.
24 Jan 1930	(United States) Mickey Darmon	(United States) Eddie Koppy	Fractured skull and cerebral hemorrhage.
20 Aug 1930	(United States) Johnny Anderson	(United States) "Red" Keuhl	
25 Aug 1930	(United States) Frankie Campbell	(United States) Max Baer	Campbell was knocked unconscious in the ring and died hours later in the hospital. Doctors discovered that his brain had been knocked loose from the connective tissue inside his head.
7 Jun 1932	(United States) Chet Edwards	(United States) Joe Torkleson	Edwards won the match, later found unconscious in dressing room and brought to hospital where he died the next day.
10 Feb 1933	(United States) Ernie Schaaf	(Italy) Primo Carnera	Schaaf suffered a knockout loss in the 13th round and immediately fell unconscious. He would go into a coma, and was rushed to the hospital to undergo surgery where he ultimately died four days later.
8 May 1933	(United States) Jack Holland	(United States) Tony Marullo	24-year-old Holland, a college football star and artist's model, died of a cerebral hemorrhage after losing in six rounds to Marullo in New Orleans. He collapsed while leaving the ring and died in a hospital the following morning.
17 Mar 1936	(United States) Tony Scarpati	(United States) Lou Ambers	Scarpati died in hospital without regaining consciousness after his knockout by Lou Ambers in the seventh round of their fight. When he fell, his head struck the ring floor. Although surgeons operated to relieve pressure resulting from the concussion, he failed to regain consciousness.
30 Jan 1937	(United States) Tony Marino	(Panama) Carlos Quintana	26-year-old Marino collapsed at the end of an eight-round bout with Quintana in Brooklyn, New York City. The ringside doctor diagnosed a brain concussion. Marino never regained consciousness, dying two days later at Wyckoff Heights Hospital in Brooklyn. New York state officials found Marino had been knocked down five times in the contest, and passed a rule that any boxer downed three times in round constitutes an automatic end to the contest for "outclassed," which is referred by the WBA as an Automatic Knockout.
16 Jul 1940	(United States) Peter Asero	(United States) Pete Muscarnera	Seemingly on his way to victory by knocking out Muscarnera to the count of nine in the first round, Asero suffered a knockout in the fourth round. He never revived. Heart attack was given as the cause of death by the Athletic Commission.
2 Jul 1941	(United States) Roy "Jack" Gillespie	(United States) Jack Chase	Gillespie died from a brain injury; Chase was taken into technical custody.
15 May 1942	(United States) John M. Marquez	(United States) Alfred David Globe	Marquez was knocked out and never regained consciousness.
3 Mar 1946	(United States) Dixon Walker	(United States) Gus Gerson	Walker died of a cerebral hemorrhage.
24 Jun 1947	(United States) Jimmy Doyle	(United States) Sugar Ray Robinson	Doyle died 17 hours after being knocked out.
15 Aug 1947	(United States) Glenn Newton Smith	(United States) Sam Baroudi	Smith was knocked out in the 9th round and never regained consciousness.
2 Feb 1948	(United States) Sam Baroudi	(United States) Ezzard Charles	Baroudi was killed by a punch from a future heavyweight champion.
28 Feb 1948	(United States) Leroy DeCatur	(United States) Freddie Herrera	Died after his first professional match.
28 Mar 1948	(Cuba) Gerardo Hernández	(Cuba) Manuel Parrado	Died in the ring following a cerebral hemorrhage.
21 Apr 1948	(United States) Jackie Darthard	(United States) Bert Lytell	Collapsed after six rounds of fighting and died after being taken to a hospital. Death ultimately ruled to be the result of a brain hemorrhage caused by an undiagnosed injury from a match five months earlier.
29 Sep 1948	(Dominican Republic) Félix Amado Gómez	(United States) Bobby McQuillar	"McQuillar hit him with a crushing right hand that sent Kid Dinamita to the canvas. The bell saved him. But he was unable to come out for the ninth round. He was carried out of the ring, and five hours later, on a hospital operating table, he died of a cerebral hemorrhage. Kid Dinamita was 22 years old."
19 Sep 1949	(Australia) Archie Kemp	(Australia) Jack Hassen	Kemp was carried from the ring on a stretcher and did not regain consciousness, dying of a cerebral haemorrhage. Referee Joe Wallis had refused to stop the fight.
22 Feb 1950	(United States) Lavern Roach	(United States) Georgie Small	Lavern sustained a fatal head injury during the match and died the next day due to a subdural hemorrhage.
20 Dec 1950	(United States) Sonny Boy West	(United States) Percy Bassett	West suffered from inter-cerebral hemorrhage resulting from a cerebral concussion and died the following day.
29 Aug 1951	(United States) Georgie Flores	(United States) Roger Donoghue	Knocked out and died a few days later. Donoghue gave match winnings to Flores' family.
12 Dec 1954	(United States) Ed Sanders	(United States) Willie James	Complained of headaches early in the day. Lost consciousness in the 11th round. Died after a long surgery to relieve bleeding in the brain.
19 Mar 1956	(Union of South Africa) Hubert Essakow	(Union of South Africa) Willie Toweel	
8 Nov 1958	(Cuba) José Blanco	(Cuba) Sugar Ramos	Died a day after a knockout loss in the eighth and final round against future world champion Sugar Ramos.
26 Oct 1959	(United States) Walt Ingram	(Mexico) José Becerra	
9 Apr 1960	(United States) Charlie Mohr	(United States) Stu Bartell	Died a week after being knocked out in NCAA tournament at Madison, Wisconsin. His death has been credited with resulting in the NCAA's termination of the sport.
6 Jun 1960	(Puerto Rico) Tommy Pacheco	(United States) Benny Gordon	Remained unconscious after fight. Brought to hospital where a brain operation was performed but succumbed to injuries.
26 Jun 1960	(Mexico) Rafael Rodriguez	(Mexico) Gaby Sanchez	Floored after hook to the liver.
15 May 1961	(United States) Harry Campbell	(United States) Al Medrano	23-year-old Campbell, a 1960 Olympic boxer, collapsed after the final bell of the tenth round of his bout with Medrano. He never regained consciousness, despite brain surgery.
24 Mar 1962	(Cuba) Benny Paret	(United States) Emile Griffith	See Benny Paret vs. Emile Griffith III; Paret died of brain injuries 10 days later.
21 Sep 1962	(Argentina) Alejandro Lavorante	(United States) John Riggins	Lavorante would spend 19 months in a coma before dying on 1 April 1964.
21 Mar 1963	(United States) Davey Moore	(Mexico) Sugar Ramos	Moore collapsed in the dressing room after the fight, and died 75 hours later. This was the second ring tragedy that Sugar Ramos was involved in.
10 May 1965	(United States) Sonny Banks	(United States) Leotis Martin	Banks is known for being the first fighter to ever score a knockdown against Muhammad Ali. He died three days after this fight at age 24.
11 Mar 1969	(Trinidad and Tobago) Ulrich Regis	(United Kingdom) Joe Bugner	Regis died four days after the fight following surgery to remove a blood clot.
30 Dec 1969	(Italy) Bernard Agbakhume Daudu	(Spain) Carlos San José	Daudu died of injuries sustained in this fight.
2 Feb 1972	(United Kingdom) Mick Pinkney	(United Kingdom) Jim Moore	Pinkney was knocked out in the fifth round and died after choking on his own blood.
19 Jul 1978	(Italy) Angelo Jacopucci	(United Kingdom) Alan Minter	Jacopucci did not collapse in the ring; he and Minter met for a meal after the fight. Jacopucci then fell into a coma and died. As a result of this, European title fights were limited to 12 rounds.
23 Nov 1979	(United States) Willie Classen	(United States) Wilford Scypion	Died following the fight.
9 Jan 1980	(United States) Charles Newell	(United States) Marlon Starling	Died after being knocked out in the 7th round.
20 Jun 1980	(Guyana) Cleveland Denny	(Canada) Gaétan Hart	Died 16 days after being knocked out.
19 Sep 1980	(United Kingdom) Johnny Owen	(Mexico) Lupe Pintor	Owen was knocked out and died six weeks later without regaining consciousness.
7 May 1982	(Philippines) Andy Balaba	(South Korea) Shin Hi-sup	Died of injuries sustained in the fight.
14 Jun 1982	(Nigeria) Young Ali	(Republic of Ireland) Barry McGuigan	Collapsed in the ring, fell into a coma, and died from a blood clot two days later.
13 Nov 1982	(South Korea) Kim Duk-koo	(United States) Ray Mancini	Kim died four days after the fight, as a result of a subdural hematoma, which filled his skull with 100 cubic centimetres of blood. As a result of this, world championship fights were limited to 12 rounds and increased testing required in Nevada.
1 Sep 1983	(Mexico) Francisco Bejines	(United States) Alberto Dávila	Died of brain injuries, despite surgery to remove a blood clot and relieve pressure on his brain.
29 May 1985	(United States) Shawn Thomas	(United States) Chris Calvin	Died of head injuries.
2 Nov 1985	(South Africa) Jacob Morake	(South Africa) Brian Mitchell	Died of head injuries.
29 Nov 1985	(Mexico) Gerardo Derbez	(Mexico) Jorge Vaca	Knocked out and fell into a coma; died from brain injuries.
14 Mar 1986	(United Kingdom) Steve Watt	(United Kingdom) Rocky Kelly	Died of brain injuries.
27 Feb 1987	(France) Jean-Claude Vinci	(France) Lionel Jean	Vinci lost the fight on points, and died 30 minutes later.
14 Jun 1988	(South Africa) Brian Baronet	(United States) Kenny Vice	Fell into a coma after being knocked out and died three days later.
13 Aug 1988	(South Africa) Daniel Thetele	(South Africa) Aaron Williams	Collapsed without regaining consciousness and died.
4 Mar 1989	(Ivory Coast) David Thio	(Guyana) Terrence "Alli" Halley	Knocked out and died 10 days later.
17 Aug 1990	(Australia) Pat Stone	(Australia) Gary Wills	Died of brain injuries the day after the fight.
27 May 1991	(South Africa) Patrick Mdiniso	(South Africa) Mongezi Mbadu	Died after being knocked unconscious.
17 Nov 1991	(South Africa) Clive Sikwebu	(South Africa) Ndoda Mayende	Died nine days after being knocked out.
1 Dec 1991	(Japan) Minoru Katsumata	(Japan) Takashi Murata	Died after being knocked out in the 10th round. It was his first professional fight.
20 Dec 1991	David Ellis	Abdenago Jofré	Ellis collapsed in the final round and died nine days after.
26 Apr 1994	(United Kingdom) Bradley Stone	(United Kingdom) Richie Wenton	Died from a blood clot.
22 Jul 1994	(Kenya) Robert Wangila	(United States) David Gonzalez	Died after an operation to remove a blood clot from his brain.
6 May 1995	(Colombia) Jimmy Garcia	(Mexico) Gabriel Ruelas	Held on the undercard of his brother Rafael's contest against Oscar De La Hoya for the WBO and IBF Lightweight Titles, Gabriel won an 11th-round TKO against Garcia, who died 13 days later due to a blood clot on the brain.
13 Oct 1995	(United Kingdom) James Murray	(United Kingdom) Drew Docherty	Murray collapsed in the final round and died on 15 October 1995 due to brain injuries.
9 Dec 1995	(Philippines) Eugene Barutag	(Philippines) Randy Andagan	On 9 December 1995, a young fighter from General Santos City named Eugene Barutag, was scheduled for an eight-round match against veteran Randy Andagan of Biñan, Laguna. Barutag was winning the match in the first four rounds and almost knocked out Andagan, but the latter got his second wind and beat the younger boxer, who at the end of the bout, collapsed in his corner. At that time, there were no standby paramedics in case of emergency. Using the service vehicle of Vintage Sports, Barutag was rushed to the Jose Reyes Memorial Hospital and was declared dead on arrival.
13 Dec 1997	(Zambia) Felix Bwalya	(United Kingdom) Paul Burke	Was knocked down three times in the final rounds; died nine days later. While in a coma, he was found to have had malaria in his bloodstream. The autopsy report stated the cause of death was cardiorespiratory failure, severe blunt force trauma to the head, and bronchopneumonia in his right lung.
12 Sep 1999	(United States) Randie Carver	(Egypt) Kabary Salem	Carver was headbutted repeatedly during the early rounds, with the contest not being stopped contrary to rules in boxing that call for a termination of contest for clash of heads. He lost consciousness and was rushed to the hospital. Carver died two days later from blunt head trauma.
20 Oct 2000	(United States) Bobby Tomasello	(Ghana) Steve Dotse	Tomasello collapsed in his dressing room after a 10-round draw. He fell into a coma from which he never awoke, dying five days later.
30 Mar 2001	(Indonesia) Muhammad Alfaridzi	(Thailand) Khongtawat Sorkiti	Alfaridzi fell into coma after Sorkiti knocked him out on the eighth round, and died three days later of bleeding in the left side of his brain.
26 Jun 2001	(United States) Beethaeven Scottland	(United States) George Khalid Jones	Jones hurt Scottland in the tenth, and Scottland dropped to the canvas and was counted out having not risen to his feet. Scottland had to be helped from the ring and fell into a coma, dying from his injuries on 1 July 2001.
23 Jun 2002	(Panama) Pedro Alcázar	(Mexico) Fernando Montiel	Alcazar was declared healthy by ringside doctors, with no visible signs of any trauma. He collapsed in his hotel room the following day, and died in hospital.
18 Jul 2003	(United States) Brad Rone	(United States) Billy Zumbrun	He turned around to walk to his corner following the 1st round when he collapsed, dying instantly. An autopsy later revealed Rone had died of a heart attack, which ringside physicians had not inspected him before the contest as required.
28 Dec 2003	(Philippines) John Eman Juarez	(Philippines) Rocky Fuentes	After Rocky Fuentes knocked John Eman Juarez out, John Eman Juarez was immediately carried from the ring on a stretcher unconscious, Juarez would regain consciousness at Cebu Doctors' Hospital but would die due to Subdural Hematoma on 1 January 2004, 1:00AM. Since then, Fuentes was never the same, he would constantly have nightmares and would not live up to his handlers' expectations.
2 Apr 2005	(United States) Becky Zerlentes	(United States) Heather Schmitz	On 2 April 2005, Zerlentes was participating in the Colorado State Boxing Senior Female Championships (an amateur boxing contest) at the Denver Coliseum in Denver, Colorado. She was knocked out in the third round by her opponent, Heather Schmitz, fell unconscious, and never regained consciousness. Zerlentes is the first woman known to have died of injuries sustained during a sanctioned boxing match in the United States. According to the Denver County coroner, the cause of death was blunt force trauma to the head.
4 March 2004	(Peru) Luis Villalta	(Puerto Rico) Ricky Quiles	35-year-old Luis Villalta died several days after losing consciousness in his dressing room minutes after losing a 12-round title fight in Miami, Florida.
1 Jul 2005	(Mexico) Martín Sánchez	(Russia) Rustam Nugaev	After the fight, a commission inspector noticed Sánchez walking strangely. He was rushed to a local hospital where he underwent emergency surgery for a subdural hematoma. He died the following morning. This was the first of two deaths in three months that led to boxing authorities in Nevada to begin a series of rule changes for boxer safety.
17 Sep 2005	(United States) Leavander Johnson	(Mexico) Jesús Chávez	Johnson collapsed in the locker room following the fight and was taken to hospital where he was placed in a medically induced coma following surgery to correct a subdural hematoma. He died on 22 September 2005. The Sánchez and Johnson fatalities led to Nevada authorities creating new regulations on hydration (certain sports drinks in sealed packets), weight cutting, glove weight, and physicians. Rules now require physicians to inspect boxers at weigh-ins, before the contest, and immediately after the contest, and require a minimum of three physicians in the ring. CT scans are now required after fights. In 2016, new brain health testing rules became mandatory, also based on this incident.
18 Mar 2006	(United States) Kevin Payne	(United States) Ryan Maraldo	Payne underwent surgery after suffering a brain injury during the fight. He died the following day.
31 Mar 2007	(Philippines) Lito Sisnorio	(Thailand) Chatchai Sasakul	Sisnorio sustained brain injuries during the fight and died the next day in hospital. The fight was deemed controversial, as Sisnorio's role in the fight was not officially sanctioned by the Philippine Games and Amusement Board.
25 Dec 2007	(South Korea) Choi Yo-sam	(Indonesia) Heri Amol	Choi collapsed while still in the ring after the bout, and was rushed to the Soonchunhyang University Hospital immediately after the fight in order to undergo emergency brain surgery. He died on 3 January 2008 after being removed from his ventilator.
15 Oct 2008	(Mexico) Daniel Aguillón	(Mexico) Alejandro Sanabria	Aguillón was punched in the jaw in the last minute of the 12th round of the super featherweight bout for the Central American title by his opponent Sanabria. He fell unconscious on the floor and was taken to a hospital, but never recovered.
30 Apr 2009	(Mexico) Benjamín Flores	(United States) Al Seeger	Flores suffered a brain injury during the fight. He died from his injuries on 5 May 2009.
18 Jul 2009	(Mexico) Marco Antonio Nazareth	(Mexico) Omar Chávez	Nazareth collapsed in the ring and had to be taken to the local hospital, where he underwent a three-hour surgery to treat a cerebral hemorrhage. He died four days later.
20 Nov 2009	(Mexico) Francisco Rodriguez	(United States) Teon Kennedy	Rodríguez immediately collapsed, losing consciousness while waiting for an official decision. He was rushed to a hospital for emergency brain surgery and died 2 days later.
17 Jul 2010	(South Korea) Bae Ki-suk	(South Korea) Jung Jin-ki	23-year-old Bae underwent five hours of brain surgery following the fight. After the operation, his body temperature, blood pressure and pulse returned to almost normal, but he remained unconscious and died four days after the bout.
12 Oct 2010	(Thailand) Sakai Jockygym	(Japan) Kazuyoshi Niki	19-year-old Sakai lost consciousness after the bout and was taken to the hospital, but died due to an acute subdural hematoma.
5 Dec 2011	(Russia) Roman Simakov	(Russia) Sergey Kovalev	27-year-old Simakov died of brain injuries after collapsing in the ring.
3 Feb 2012	(Philippines) Karlo Maquinto	(Philippines) Mark Joseph Costa	Boxer Karlo Maquinto died Friday, five days after falling into a coma because of a blood clot in his brain after a bout in Caloocan City. He was 21. Maquinto battled back from two knockdowns to earn a majority draw against Mark Joseph Costa in their four-round flyweight bout.The death of the Iloilo-born boxer has sparked calls for an investigation, particularly from House Games and Amusements chair Rep. Amado Bagatsing and boxing promoter Jun Sarreal, who stressed that the medical history of boxers should always be looked into before fights.
31 Mar 2012	(Indonesia) Muhammad Afrizal	(Indonesia) Irvan Barita Marbun	30-year-old Afrizal began vomiting an hour after the bout and fell unconscious with a hemorrhage. He died four days after brain surgery to remove a blood clot.
28 Mar 2013	(United Kingdom) Michael Norgrove	(United Kingdom) Tom Bowen	32-year-old Norgrove collapsed in Round 5, and died on 6 April without regaining consciousness.
19 Oct 2013	(Mexico) Francisco Leal	(Mexico) Raul Hirales	26-year-old Leal went into a coma after suffering a KO loss to Raul Hirales. He was taken from the ring on a stretcher and brought to a hospital in Los Cabos. He was then transferred to Laz Paz, and later brought to a hospital in San Diego, where he died. He had a record of 20-8-3 with 13 KOs.
20 Dec 2013	(Japan) Tesshin Okada	(Japan) Masafumi Kamiyama	21-year-old Okada suffered a fourth-round TKO in professional debut. He collapsed after the fight, and was rushed to hospital to undergo surgery for acute subdural hematoma. He died 17 days later on 6 January 2014
10 Oct 2014	(South Africa) Phindile Mwelase	(South Africa) Liz Butler	Mwelase was defeated by knockout in a boxing match in Pretoria, after which she fell into a coma; she died after remaining in the coma for two weeks. It is one of the first recognised deaths in women's professional boxing.
14 Mar 2015	(Australia) Braydon Smith	(Philippines) John Vincent Moralde	23-year-old Smith lost a 10-round unanimous points decision to Moralde in Toowoomba, Australia. He lost consciousness 90 minutes later at Toowoomba Hospital, and died after spending two days in a medically induced coma at Princess Alexandra Hospital, Brisbane.
17 Oct 2015	(Puerto Rico) Prichard Colón	(United States) Terrel Williams	Williams (14–0, 12 KO) faced Colón (16–0, 13 KO) in a 10-round welterweight contest at the Premier Boxing Champions card televised on NBC at EagleBank Arena on the campus of George Mason University in Fairfax, Virginia. Williams knocked Colón down twice in the ninth round, with Colón's corner taking the gloves off their boxer after nine rounds with one round remaining. Williams was declared the winner by technical knockout. Colón was sent to Inova Fairfax Hospital, where he was diagnosed with a subdural hematoma, and he underwent an emergency procedure to reduce brain swelling. His coma lasted 221 days and was left in a vegetative state until his death on 13 August 2026.
14 Nov 2015	(Nicaragua) David Acevedo	(Nicaragua) Nelson Altamirano	23-year-old Acevedo died a week after lapsing into a coma, following an 8th-round TKO loss against Nelson Altamirano in Managua, Nicaragua.
19 Dec 2015	(United States) Hamzah Al-Jahmi	(United States) Anthony Taylor	19-year-old flyweight Al-Jahmi died after being knocked unconscious after participating in his first professional match in Youngstown, Ohio.
29 Sep 2016	(United Kingdom) Mike Towell	(United Kingdom) Dale Evans	25-year-old Towell was knocked down in the 1st round and again in the 5th prior to the stoppage, he was carried from the ring on a stretcher and taken to hospital. He died late the following day of severe cerebral hemorrhage. Towell had taken a break from fighting due to severe migraines several weeks before his fatal fight.
27 May 2017	(Canada) David Whittom	(Canada) Gary Kopas	Whittom suffered from a brain hemorrhage and was rushed to Saint John Regional Hospital the next morning to have part of his skull removed. He spent the next 10 months in a medically induced coma before dying on 16 March 2018, aged 39, legally over the maximum boxing age in most regions.
16 Jun 2017	(Canada) Tim Hague	(Canada) Adam Braidwood	34-year-old Hague was knocked down five times in the first two rounds, and died two days later after being taken off of life support.
24 Feb 2018	(United Kingdom) Scott Westgarth	(United Kingdom) Dec Spelman	31-year-old Scott Westgarth defeated Dec Spelman. Westgarth was knocked down just before the end of the fight and collapsed in the locker room. Westgarth was rushed to a nearby hospital and died.
5 Nov 2018	(Thailand) Christian Daghio	(Thailand) Don Parueang	49-year-old Christian Daghio was knocked to the canvas twice in the final round of his WBC Asia title fight against Don Parueang on 26 October. After his second knockdown, Daghio was immediately treated by medical staff inside the ring. He was subsequently taken to hospital in Bangkok, where he spent two days in a coma before dying. Daghio was in violation of upper age limits enforced by most authorities (maximum age of 37), and this death, along with one involving a 13-year old boxer (see below) a week later, led to Thai authorities reviewing legislation on minimum, but not maximum, age of boxers.
12 Nov 2018	(Thailand) Anucha Thasako	(Thailand) Phetmongkol Por Peenapat	13-year-old Anucha Thasako died from a brain haemorrhage two days after a boxing charity match against a 14-year-old boy. They were both were not wearing any protective headgear. Thasako was boxing since the age of eight-year-old and had done 170 fights to earn money for his family. After his death the Thai parliament reviewed legislation to ban children under 12 years old from boxing matches.
19 Jul 2019	(Russia) Maxim Dadashev	(Puerto Rico) Subriel Matías	The match was stopped after 11 rounds by Dadashev's trainer James "Buddy" McGirt, himself a former championship boxer. 28-year-old Dadashev collapsed while being transported to the hospital where he underwent emergency brain surgery. He was placed into a coma, before dying three days after the fight due to cerebral edema caused by sustained hits to the head.
25 Jul 2019	(Argentina) Hugo Alfredo Santillán	(Uruguay) Eduardo Javier Abreu	According to ringside reports, the 23-year-old Santillán's nose began bleeding in the fourth round of 20 July contest. Santillán passed out as the judges were announcing the draw. After being admitted to the hospital, he had swelling of the brain and successive kidney failure. As the swelling worsened, it affected the functioning of the rest of his organs and he never regained consciousness. Santillán underwent surgery for a clot in his brain, and twice went into cardiorespiratory failure before he died of cardiac arrest. Santillán was illegally participating in the contest under suspension. Forty days prior, on 15 June, he lost to Artem Harutyunyan by unanimous decision in Hamburg, Germany. After a post-fight medical examination, the Association of German Professional Boxers (German: Bund Deutscher Berufsboxer) suspended Santillán 45 days, which was to have expired on 30 July. Argentine authorities did not notice the BDB suspension on Santillán's licence, as it was not a knockout loss. Trainer Orlando Farias knew about the BDB-assessed suspension, and did not coach him in this fight.
21 Sep 2019	(Bulgaria) Boris Stanchov	(Albania) Ardit Murja	It was initially reported that 21-year-old Isus Velichkov collapsed during a match with Ardit Murja after suffering a cardiac arrest. It was later revealed that Stanchov was using the boxing license of his cousin Velichkov. According to Bad Left Hook, Stanchov had been fighting under his name for the past year, and was also stepping into the ring using Velichkov's medicals, The contest took place in Albania, where boxing regulations regarding licencing (such as the Muhammad Ali Boxing Reform Act in the United States) are not enforced. Stanchov's use of Velichkov's medical record is legally a violation of boxing regulations. The tragedy struck in the fifth round of his scrap in Albania after being caught with a jab. He had appeared wobbly on his feet in the moments before hitting the canvas. The fight was immediately waved off, and the referee and medical teams rushed into the ring.
12 Oct 2019	(United States) Patrick Day	(United States) Charles Conwell	27-year-old Day was knocked down three times in his fight with Conwell. The final knockdown that stopped the fight was particularly brutal, as Day's head violently bounced on the canvas. Seeing the way Day fell, the referee immediately stopped the fight. Day was rushed to a hospital, where he began to suffer seizures, and shortly after fell into a coma. Doctors then performed emergency brain surgery. Four days later on 16 October 2019, Day died from what was described as traumatic brain injury. Following his death, boxing promoter Eddie Hearn said the sport needed to become safer.
16 Apr 2021	(Jordan) Rashed Al-Swaisat	(Estonia) Anton Vinogradov	18-year-old Alswaisat was knocked out in a preliminary-round light-heavyweight bout with Vinogradov at the AIBA Youth World Championships in Kielce, Poland. He was treated in the ring and taken to a hospital in Kielce, where he died ten days later on 26 April 2021.
28 Aug 2021	(Mexico) Jeanette Zacarías Zapata	(Canada) Marie Pier Houle	18-year-old Zapata was knocked down after a series of uppercuts at the end of the fourth round against Houle at the GVM Gala International in Montreal on 28 August 2021. Zapata seemed to suffer a seizure after the fight was stopped, and was taken to the hospital, where she would die on 3 September 2021.
16 Oct 2021	(Mexico) Moisés Fuentes	(Mexico) David Cuéllar Contreras	Fuentes suffered a blood clot in his brain. He never fought again after that and complications from the injury resulted in his death at the age of 37 on 24 November 2022.
2 Nov 2021	(Zimbabwe) Taurai Zimunya	(Zimbabwe) Tinashe Majoni	24-year-old bantamweight Taurai Zimunya was knocked out in the third round of his match with a brain injury. He was taken to the hospital where he never regained consciousness.
7 Jan 2022	(Russia) Arest Saakyan	(Russia) Igor Semernin	26-year-old Russian-Armenian boxer Arest Saakyan was knocked down in the last 8th round of bout at the Kings of Ring in Togliatti on 26 December 2021. He died 10 days later.
27 Feb 2022	(Indonesia) Hero Tito	(Indonesia) James Mokoginta	Tito fell into a coma after suffering a one punch knockout in round 7 from an uppercut against fellow Indonesian James Mokoginta at the Holywings Club in Jakarta, Tito would die on 3 March due to injuries suffered.
25 Mar 2022	(United States) Laron Peoples	(United States) Sheldon Wright	Peoples died after contending the Elite Male Division at the South Dakota Golden Gloves boxing show in Rapid City. He was taken by ambulance from the scene and died in hospital.
9 April 2022	(United Kingdom) Dominic Chapman	(United Kingdom) James Bradley	26-year-old novice boxer Chapman was taking part in a charity match at a nightclub when he was felled by a catastrophic punch by a more skilled opponent 3 minutes and 59 seconds into the bout. Chapman died two days later. His opponent was later diagnosed with PTSD.
5 June 2022	(South Africa) Simiso Buthelezi	(South Africa) Siphesihle Mntungwa	24-year-old South African boxer Simiso Buthelezi began punching aimlessly in a different direction after Siphesihle Mntungwa was knocked into the ropes by Buthelezi. The referee stopped the fight, and Buthelezi was transported to hospital where a brain bleed was discovered. Buthelezi was placed into a medically induced coma from which he never woke up, as he died two days later.
1 October 2022	(Colombia) Luis Quiñones	(Colombia) José Muñoz	25-year-old Colombian Welterweight Luis Quiñones died five days after a professional match at Coliseo Elías Chegwi in Colombia.
25 March 2023	(United Arab Emirates) Jubal Reji Kurian	(United Kingdom) Ian David	23-year-old Jubal Reji Kurian died after suffering bleeding on the brain during an amateur bout at Harvey Hadden Sports Village in Bilborough, Nottingham.
6 May 2023	(Philippines) Kenneth Egano	(Philippines) Jason Facularin	Kenneth Egano died on 10 May 2023, after a four-day coma stemming from a post-fight brain hemorrhage, while waiting for his fight results, the 22-year old General Santos City-native, Egano collapsed on his fight against Jason Facularin at "Blow by Blow", a boxing event backed by Senator and eight-division world champion Manny Pacquiao, unfortunately as Egano was declared the winner, by the time, Egano has already collapsed, later was pronounced sustaining a comatose hours later, eventually led to his death.
10 October 2023	(Brazil) João Victor Penha	(Brazil) Unknown	23-year-old amateur died three days after receiving a knockout punch 90 seconds into a championship boxing match in Jijoca de Jericoacoara, Brazil.
17 Dec 2023	(Russia) Timofey Shadrin	(Russia) Unknown	14-year-old boxer died after a series of punches to body at the final of Pervouralsk youth championship.
26 Dec 2023	(Japan) Kazuki Anaguchi	(Japan) Seiya Tsutsumi	Naoya Inoue (WBC, WBO) vs Marlon Tapales (WBA, IBF) super bantamweight (122 pound / 55 kg) title unification match undercard at Ariake Arena on 26 December 2023. Tsutumi knocked Anaguchi down four times, the last in the final ten seconds of the final (tenth) round. Tsutsumi won via unanimous decision, 94–92, 94–92, 95–91. Anaguchi was rushed to the hospital after legs were twitching, remaining unconscious for more than a month, dying of subdural hematoma in February 2024.
5 Apr 2024	(Republic of the Congo) Ardi Ndembo	(Cuba) Nestor Santana	Promising Congolese prospect Ardi Ndembo fought Cuban Nestor Santana on 5 April 2024 in a Team Combat League contest between the Las Vegas Hustle (Ndembo) and Miami Stealth (Santana) held inside the Infiniti of Coral Gables, Florida showroom, which was conducted under Team Combat League regulations. Sixteen boxers per team, consisting of two boxers per weight class—126 men, 126 women, 135 men, 147 men, 147 women, 160 men, 175 men, 201 men, participate in a 24-round contest with each boxer participating in one-round matches, with boxers doing no more than two of the 24 rounds with one round in each weight and sex class per eight-round period. During the eighth round, which is the final round of the first period and the round for these two boxers, video showed Santana was throwing hooks to the back of Ndembo's head (a rabbit punch in violation of boxing rules) at 30 seconds into the round, which the referee did not notice until slightly later when she warned Santana. After Ndembo slipped around 45 seconds, Santana was taunting. At 56 seconds, Santana knocked Ndembo down and according to Marca, Ndembo remained unconscious on the canvas for ten minutes. Under Team Combat League rules, the knockout ends only the eighth round, not the contest, and the 10-point must scoring system for each round grants an automatic score for knockout. The contest continued with the ninth round featuring the remaining 30 boxers contesting the remaining 15 rounds, as the two boxers' second one-round contest (which was scheduled for the third period) was scratched and ruled a stoppage win for Santana for points purposes, which Miami won, 229–220. Ndembo was moved to Jackson Memorial Hospital, where he was in a coma before his death on 26 April 2024.
12 May 2024	(United Kingdom) Sherif Lawal	(Portugal) Malam Varela	Pro debut for 29-year-old Lawal in contest against Varela at the J+Hackney Leisure Centre in Harrow in London, England. In the fourth round, Lawal went down from a right to the head. Referee Lee Every stopped the contest. Lawal was taken by ambulance to hospital, where he was pronounced dead. The main event, Amarildo Bakaj vs Mawuli Folivi, was postponed to 15 September.
10 July 2024	(Solomon Islands) Lemuel Silisia	(Australia) Adam Flood	27-year-old Silisia died several days after competing for the World Boxing Foundation Australasian Super Lightweight Title in Tamworth, NSW after losing on points. He was admitted to hospital with a head injury after the bout.
26 Oct 2024	(Fiji) Ubayd Haider	(China) Zhou Runqi	Haider (born Nathaniel Singh) died 16 days after being knocked out, on 10 November, after contesting the IBO Asia Pacific Super Featherweight title fight on 26 Oct. in Nadi, Fiji. He never regained consciousness after slipping into a coma after emergency brain surgery. The Singh family has filed litigation over the organisers violating boxing safety rules (ambulances, doctors, drug tests, al) after admissions that Fiji authorities did not follow boxing regulations.
1 Feb 2025	(Republic of Ireland) John Cooney	(Wales) Nathan Howells	Cooney died 7 days after his first defence of his Celtic super-featherweight title against Welshman Nathan Howells, in the Ulster Hall in Belfast. The contest was stopped in the ninth round. Cooney was assessed by the onsite medical team in the ring before being taken out on a stretcher and transferred to the Royal Victoria Hospital. Cooney suffered an intracranial haemorrhage and underwent surgery to relieve pressure on his brain. He remained in intensive care. His death was announced on 8 February 2025.
2 Aug 2025	(Japan) Hiromasa Urakawa	(Japan) Yoji Saito	Both occurred at Teiken Promotions' "Dynamic Glove on U-Next" card at Korakuen Hall in Tokyo, Japan. In an undercard contest, Urakawa was knocked out in the eighth round by Yoji Saito at 2:12, suffering a brain bleed and required craniotomy brain surgery, but he succumbed on 9 August. In the main event, Kotari and Hata fought to a 12-round split draw for Hata's Oriental and Pacific Boxing Federation super featherweight title. After the contest, Kotari fell unconscious and was taken to a hospital for a brain bleed, and also had a craniotomy, with the 28-year old died 8 August from the contest. On 5 August 2025, the World Boxing Council (WBC) noted their Asian affiliate Oriental and Pacific Boxing Federation that sanctioned the contests reduced regional championship bouts from 12 to 10 rounds.
2 Aug 2025	(Japan) Shigetoshi Kotari	(Japan) Yamato Hata	
1 Aug 2026	(Republic of Ireland) Lee Reeves	(Republic of Ireland) Gary Cully	After being knocked out in the 10th round of the contest on 1 August 2026, Lee Reeves suffered severe brain injuries and was placed in a medically induced coma after emergency surgery. Reeves battled infections for the following months before ultimately succumbing to an infection and passing away on 16 November 2026.
