= Brian Baronet =

South African boxer

Personal information
- Nationality: (South Africa) South African
- Born: Brian Baronet; 7 August 1960 Durban, South Africa
- Died: 17 June 1988 (aged 27)
- Weight: Light Welterweight

Boxing career
- Stance: Orthodox

Boxing record
- Total fights: 38
- Wins: 34
- Losses: 4
- Draws: 0

Brian Baronet (7 August 1960 – 17 June 1988) was a South African professional boxer.

== Beginnings ==
Baronet began his career in 1980, winning his first professional appearance against Paulus Shozi with a TKO. He won eighteen consecutive fights before his first defeat against Lorenzo Garcia in March 1983.

After his victory against Domingo Ayala in July 1985, and with a record of 29 wins and 1 defeat, Baronet was in reach of a shot at the world title. These plans were derailed when he suffered a surprise defeat against Arthur Mayisela in his next fight.

In an attempt to work his way back to another shot, he set off on a tour of the United States, winning his first three fights, before losing to Harold Brazier in a tenth-round TKO.

On returning to South Africa at the end of 1986, Baronet retired, with a record of 36 wins, 19 by knockout, and 3 defeats.

Baronet was drawn out of retirement in 1988, winning his first two comeback fights before his ill-fated bout with Kenny Vice.

== Death ==
Baronet died three days after being knocked out by Kenny Vice on 14 June 1988. Baronet had been involved in an automobile accident four days earlier. Although he was passed fit after the accident, Andries Steyn claimed that Baronet had been unconscious in the vehicle and had suffered bleeding on the brain.

== See also ==
- List of deaths due to injuries sustained in boxing
