= Scott Westgarth =

British boxer (1986–2018)

Personal information
- Nationality: English
- Born: 10 July 1986 Hexham, Northumberland, United Kingdom
- Died: 25 February 2018 (aged 31) Sheffield, United Kingdom
- Height: 188 cm (6 ft 2 in)
- Weight: Light heavyweight

Boxing career
- Stance: Orthodox

Boxing record
- Total fights: 10
- Wins: 7
- Win by KO: 2
- Losses: 2
- Draws: 1

Scott Westgarth (10 July 1986 – 26 February 2018) was a British light heavyweight boxer. He died on 26 February 2018 at the age of 31 after sustaining injuries following a victory in a 10-round light heavyweight bout during a Saturday night clash. Westgarth's final fight was widely considered to be the biggest victory of his career.

== Career ==
Westgarth boxed 10 matches in his professional career, ending with 7 victories, 2 losses and a draw before his death. He fought in his final bout on 24 February 2018 against Dec Spelman. This was a 10-round light heavyweight eliminator in Doncaster. He defeated Spelman in the elimination match on points and was looking to try to win the English national championship.

== Death ==
During the final round of the fight against Spelman, Westgarth was knocked down, but was able to recover to ultimately win on points. He went on to conduct a post-match interview before consulting doctors in the dressing room. They sent him to Royal Hallamshire Hospital in an ambulance after concerns for his well-being. During the interview Westgarth held his wrapped hand to his head above his left eye a number of times, suggesting he was in some discomfort.

Westgarth died the next day, 25 February 2018. Westgarth was a registered organ donor.

== See also ==
- List of deaths due to injuries sustained in boxing
