= Hugo Santillan =

Argentine boxer (1995–2019)

Personal information
- Nationality: Argentine
- Born: May 30, 1995
- Died: July 25, 2019 (aged 24)
- Occupation: Boxer

Hugo Alfredo Santillan (born May 30, 1995 – July 25, 2019) was an Argentine professional boxer who died at the age of 23 from injuries sustained during a boxing match.

== Career ==
Santillan competed in the super lightweight division, and by the time of his final match, he had compiled a professional record of 19 wins, 6 losses, and 2 draws.

== Illegal Contest and Death ==
On June 15, 2019, Santillan lost a ten-round unanimous decision against Artem Harutyunyan in Hamburg, Germany, in what was considered a one-sided contest for the young German. Following a post-contest medical examination, the Association of German Professional Boxers (Bund Deutscher Berufsboxer, BDB) assessed a 45 day suspension of Santillan's boxing licence, including a prohibition of contact or sparring, which would expire July 31, 2019.

On July 20, 2019, while Santillan was under suspension for the Harutyunyan contest, he faced Uruguayan boxer Eduardo Javier Abreu in Buenos Aires in a WBC Latino Silver lightweight title bout. The match ended in a draw, but Santillan began experiencing distress shortly after the fight. Santillan collapsed in the ring and was rushed to Hospital Agudos San Felipe. Doctors discovered a clot on his brain and performed emergency surgery. Santillan went into cardiorespiratory failure twice and suffered severe brain swelling, which led to the failure of his other organs. Despite the efforts to stabilize him, Santillan died of cardiac arrest at 12:35 a.m. local time on Thursday, July 25, 2019.

It was discovered after Santillan's death his contest against Abreu was illegal. Argentine officials had not been notified of his 45-day suspension, and should have prevented the contest from happening.

== See also ==
- List of deaths due to injuries sustained in boxing
