= Jack Hassen =

Australian boxer

Jack Hassen (25 January 1924 – 8 December 2002) was an Australian Aboriginal boxer, and won the Australian Lightweight Championship in 1949. In various historical sources Hassen was also known as Jack Friday, but in 2011 his family asserted that he never identified as Jack Friday and that Friday was actually a corruption of his father's first name, Friday Mackay. He was inducted into the Australian National Boxing Hall of Fame in 2005.

== Background ==
Jack Hassen was a Kalkadoon man, born in Cloncurry, western Queensland. He was orphaned at the age of two, and sent to live on the Aboriginal mission on Palm Island. In his late teens, he began his fighting career as a member of Jimmy Sharman's travelling boxing troupe, travelling around country towns, boxing 'a round or two for a pound or two'.

== Boxing career ==
Before long, Hassen was fighting professional bouts in Brisbane and Townsville. He fought 25 fights in Atherton, Charters Towers, Townsville and Brisbane between December 1943 and September 1948. And then to Sydney, where he trained under Ern McQuillan, who coached many of Australia's national boxing champions of the era. Hassen's first recorded fight at Sydney Stadium was in October 1948, and he fought seven bouts before he was matched with Archie Kemp on 19 September 1949, for the vacant Australian Lightweight Champion at Sydney Stadium. Kemp was a 25 year old truck driver from Melbourne and both fighters were in good shape ahead of the fight. Kemp managing to stay clear of Hassen for eight rounds but in the 9th and 10th rounds Hassen began to land solid punches. Trailing on points in the 11th round, Kemp began to falter as Hassen's punches prevailed. Hassen, seeing Kemp was in physical trouble, stopped and turned to the referee, Joe Wallis, in an appeal to stop the fight but Wallis refused, motioned for him to continue and Hassen was told 'Box on!'. Kemp was carried out on a stretcher and taken to St. Vincent's Hospital. He never regained consciousness and died from a cerebral haemorrhage on the morning of 20 September 1949, leaving behind a wife and a two-year-old son. Wallis denied that he should have stopped the fight.

Kemp's death was ruled an accident by the City Coroner and his death prompted political agitation to establish greater regulations over professional boxing. It was argued a boxing control board would have never matched Kemp against Hassen as Kemp had not fought in a boxing match for 4 months. Despite being cleared of any wrongdoing, Hassen never fully recovered from the incident and lost the will to punch hard, with 6 of his 8 defeats coming after his fight with Kemp. He retired in 1951 with his final record reading 32–8, 26 KO's.

== Activism ==
Hassen was a member of the Sydney branch of the Waterside Workers' Federation, joining in November 1963 and retiring in July 1984. He participated in a number of deputations to Canberra to campaign for union rights. In 1967 Hassen was present at a rally at Sydney Stadium to support American boxer Muhammad Ali in his protest against his conscription to fight in the Vietnam War.

== Later life ==
Hassen was married to Norma Simms, whom he nicknamed Kate. They met in 1950 and together they had four children and 18 grand children. Hassen died at the age of 77 in LaPerouse, Sydney on Sunday, 8 December 2002 after a long battle with Alzheimer's disease. His funeral took place at St Andrews Catholic Church, Malabar, Sydney on Friday, 13 December 2002. He is buried at Eastern Suburbs Memorial Park (Botany Cemetery), Matraville, New South Wales.
