= Brad Rone =

American boxer

Brad Rone (September 30, 1968 – July 18, 2003) was a journeyman boxer from Cincinnati, Ohio. Rone was not an accomplished boxer: He lost 26 professional bouts in a row before dying.

Rone died after a fight with Billy Zumbrun, a boxer who had beaten Rone before, and who had become friends with Rone after their first fight. Rone had been banned from fighting in Nevada for three years. Although he lived in Las Vegas, commissioner Marc Ratner, considered one of the most serious and respected figures in boxing, felt Rone was in risk of getting injured every time he boxed, so he denied the Ohio native a license in 2000. Rone then took to the road to find fights, going as far as Germany and Denmark.

Despite being banned from Nevada, he fought several times in California, as well as in Idaho and Texas. His fights with Zumbrun were in Utah. Usually, when a boxer is banned from fighting in one state of the United States, the suspension carries over to the other states, but in Rone's case, he still managed to get fights on U.S. soil.

On July 17, Rone's mother died of a heart attack. Seemingly out of money to fly to Ohio, Rone was offered a fight with Zumbrun in Utah the following day, for a fee of 800 dollars. He accepted, and drove to Utah for the fight.

Rone was hit by a Zumbrun jab just before the bell to end the first round. He turned around to walk to his corner when he collapsed, dying instantly. A ringside doctor tried to revive him using cardiopulmonary resuscitation, but his efforts were in vain. An autopsy later revealed Rone had died of a heart attack instead of as a consequence of the punch inflicted by Zumbrun.

Various theories have been formed after his death: Rone was a large, 260-pound (120 kg) man who might have inherited a heart condition from his mother. He was distraught by her death and might have been under pressure and distress before the fight. Since he had a losing streak of 26 bouts in a row, the theory that he might have taken too much punishment inside a ring is also credible.

Former commissioner Ratner himself said that he would not have allowed Rone to fight. Moreover, Arizona senator John McCain expressed his feeling that Rone's death showed that a unified national boxing commission was needed, one which would verify boxers' records and whether they are banned from one state or not. Rone's opponent, Zumbrun, told friends that Rone lacked his usual strength.
