= Archie Kemp =

Australian boxer

Archie Kemp (18 October 1925 – 20 September 1949) was an Australian boxer from Melbourne who died in the ring while fighting against Jack Hassen for the Australian Lightweight title.

Kemp was carried from the ring on a stretcher and did not regain consciousness, dying of a cerebral haemorrhage. The referee refused to stop the fight.

Kemp's death prompted political agitation to establish greater controls over boxing.
