= Artem Harutyunyan (boxer) =

German boxer

Personal information
- Nickname: The Original
- Nationality: German
- Born: 13 August 1990 (age 35) Yerevan, Armenian SSR, Soviet Union
- Height: 1.72 m (5 ft 8 in)
- Weight: Lightweight; Light-welterweight

Boxing career

Boxing record
- Total fights: 14
- Wins: 12
- Win by KO: 7
- Losses: 2
Medal record
Men's amateur boxing
Representing Germany
Olympic Games
Bronze medal – third place	2016 Rio de Janeiro	Light-welterweight
European Championships
Bronze medal – third place	2013 Minsk	Light-welterweight

Artem Harutyunyan (Armenian: Արտեմ Հարությունյան, born 13 August 1990) is an Armenian-born German professional boxer. As an amateur, Harutyunyan represented Germany at the 2016 Olympics, winning a bronze medal in the light-welterweight bracket.

== Professional career ==
Harutyunyan challenged and lost against Shakur Stevenson for his WBC lightweight title on July 6, 2024.

== Professional boxing record ==
14 fights	12 wins	2 losses
By knockout	7	0
By decision	5	2

No.	Result	Record	Opponent	Type	Round, time	Date	Location	Notes
14	Loss	12–2	Shakur Stevenson	UD	12	Jul 6, 2024	Prudential Center, Newark, New Jersey, U.S.	For WBC lightweight title
13	Loss	12–1	Frank Martin	UD	12	Jul 15, 2023	Cosmopolitan of Las Vegas, Las Vegas, Nevada, U.S.	
12	Win	12–0	Humberto Galindo	UD	10	25 Jun 2022	Universum Gym, Hamburg, Germany	Retained WBC International lightweight title
11	Win	11–0	Samuel Molina	KO	5 (10), 2:31	25 Sep 2021	Universum Gym, Hamburg, Germany	Won vacant WBC International lightweight title
10	Win	10–0	Vladyslav Melnyk	SD	12	24 Apr 2021	Universum Gym, Hamburg, Germany	Won vacant WBA International lightweight title
9	Win	9–0	Miguel Cesario Antin	RTD	4 (10), 3:00	25 Jan 2020	Work Your Champ Arena, Hamburg, Germany	Retained IBO International light-welterweight title
8	Win	8–0	Islam Dumanov	MD	10	9 Nov 2019	Kuppel, Hamburg, Germany	Won vacant IBO International light-welterweight title
7	Win	7–0	Hugo Alfredo Santillan	UD	10	15 Jun 2019	Work Your Champ Arena, Hamburg, Germany	Won vacant IBO Continental light-welterweight title
6	Win	6–0	Giorgi Bliadze	KO	2 (6), 2:17	6 Apr 2019	Ballhaus Forum, Bayern, Germany	
5	Win	5–0	Merab Turkadze	KO	8 (10), 1:20	22 Sep 2018	Work Your Champ Arena, Hamburg, Germany	Won vacant German International light-welterweight title
4	Win	4–0	Milos Janjanin	TKO	2 (6), 1:09	26 May 2018	Work Your Champ Arena, Hamburg, Germany	
3	Win	3–0	Ahmet Huric	TKO	1 (4), 1:05	17 Mar 2018	Altrheinhalle, Rastatt, Germany	
2	Win	2–0	David Vicanovic	TKO	1 (4), 1:15	10 Feb 2018	LEO's Boxgym, Munich, Germany	
1	Win	1–0	Avelino Vazquez	PTS	6	25 Nov 2017	Work Your Champ Arena, Hamburg, Germany	
