= Pretty Boy Lucas =

Filipino former professional boxer

Personal information
- Nickname: Pretty Boy
- Nationality: (Philippines) Filipino
- Born: Santiago Domingo Lucas; December 20, 1966 (age 59) Norzagaray, Bulacan, Philippines
- Height: 5 ft 5 in (1.65 m)
- Weight: Mini flyweight Light flyweight Flyweight

Boxing career
- Stance: Orthodox

Boxing record
- Total fights: 43
- Wins: 34
- Win by KO: 10
- Losses: 7
- Draws: 2

Santiago Domingo Lucas (born December 20, 1966, in Norzagaray, Bulacan), known professionally as Pretty Boy Lucas is a retired Filipino professional boxer who competed from 1983 to 1995, challenging for the world title to four times in the 1980s and the 1990s but not successful.

== Pugilistic career ==
Lucas went pro in late 1983 include won the Philippines mini flyweight (105 lbs) champion. He had the opportunity to challenge for the vacant IBF mini flyweight world title against Thai boxer Samuth Sithnaruepol on March 24, 1988, at Rajadamnern Stadium, Bangkok.

Undefeated Lucas, who wore navy blue trunks with white diagonal bar, fought well and can punch the right fist to the opponent's chin until staggers in the first round. Unfortunately, in the 11th round, he was beaten by Sithnaruepol's fist as a result, his right eyebrow seriously bleed. The bout had to end when the doctor didn't allow him to continue fighting and made him lose. Although Thai boxer was the victor and became the new champion, the spectators shouted "Khi khong Khi khong Khi khong" (Thai: ขี้โกง ขี้โกง ขี้โกง; literally: "cheating cheating cheating") to express their dissatisfaction with the decision.

Two years later, he returned to Thailand to challenge the world title in the same weight class and same organization with the new champion Fahlan Lukmingkwan on December 20, 1990, Lucas's 24th birthday. The result was a draw.

On March 16, 1992, Lucas had the opportunity to challenge the world title for the third time with Ricardo López the unbeaten Mexican champion in Mexico City. He was the unanimous loser.

Subsequently, he promoted to the flyweight (112 lbs) to challenge the WBO world title with South Africa's Jacob Matlala on October 15, 1994. Lacus was the unanimous loser again.

His last bout took place on February 20, 1995, in Tokyo, Japan when losing by technical knockout in the 10th round to Chang Jae Kwon from South Korea. He was so injured in the fight that he had to undergo two brain surgeries, therefore had to retire by default. Pretty Boy Lucas record for 43 fights is 34 wins (10 on knockouts), 7 losses (2 on knockouts), and 2 draws.

== Professional boxing record ==
43 fights	34 wins	7 losses
By knockout	10	2
By decision	24	5
Draws	2	

No.	Result	Record	Opponent	Type	Round, Time	Date	Location	Notes
43	Loss	34–7–2	Chang Jae Kwon	TKO	9 (10)	20 Feb 1995	Tokyo, Japan	
42	Loss	34–6–2	Jacob Matlala	UD	12	15 Oct 1994	Superbowl, Sun City, South Africa	For WBO flyweight title
41	Win	34–5–2	Alpong Navaja	UD	10	28 May 1994	Elorde Sports Center, Parañaque City, Philippines	
40	Loss	33–5–2	Tomonori Tamura	PTS	10	21 Mar 1984	Tokyo, Japan	
39	Win	33–4–2	Genyu Maeshiro	UD	10	12 Dec 1993	Tokyo, Japan	
38	Win	32–4–2	Ali Moril	TKO	10 (10) 2:51	22 Sep 1993	Elorde Sports Center, Parañaque City, Philippines	
37	Win	31–4–2	Nikki Maca	UD	10	20 May 1993	Cuneta Astrodome, Pasay City, Philippines	
36	Win	30–4–2	Javier Barguez	SD	12	20 Mar 1993	Merida, Yucatán, Mexico	
35	Win	29–4–2	Alfredo Xeque	UD	12	16 Dec 1992	Campeche City, Campeche, Mexico	
34	Win	28–4–2	Samanchai Chalermsri	TD	7 (10)	26 Sep 1992	Ninoy Aquino Stadium, District of Malate, Manila, Philippines	Samanchai fractures Right hand in Round 1
33	Loss	27–4–2	Oh Kwang-soo	TD	6 (10) 2:05	12 Jul 9192	Wonkwang University, Iksan, South Korea	
32	Loss	27–3–2	Ricardo López	UD	10	16 Mar 1992	Fronton Mexico, Mexico City, Mexico	For WBC minimumweight title
31	Loss	27–2–2	Manny Melchor	SD	10	13 Dec 1991	Rizal Memorial Sports Complex, Manila, Philippines	
30	Win	27–1–2	Lorenzo Lopez	UD	10	4 Oct 1991	Sheraton Waikiki Hotel, Honolulu, U.S.A.	
29	Win	26–1–2	Edgar Decena	UD	10	9 May 1991	Sheraton Waikiki Hotel, Honolulu, U.S.A.	
28	Draw	25–1–2	Fahlan Sakkreerin	SD	12	20 Dec 1990	Rajadamnern Stadium, Bangkok, Thailand	For IBF minimumweight title
27	Win	25–1–1	Yasuo Yogi	UD	10	23 Jun 1990	Ninoy Aquino Stadium, District of Malate, Manila, Philippines	
26	Win	24–1–1	Nico Thomas	RTD	7 (10) 3:00	16 Mar 1990	Ninoy Aquino Stadium, District of Malate, Manila, Philippines	
25	Win	23–1–1	Elson Duran	UD	12	21 Oct 1989	Rizal Memorial Coliseum, Manila, Philippines	Retained Philippine Games and Amusements Board(GAB) Filipino minimumweight title
24	Win	22–1–1	Fred Tepait	UD	10	24 Jun 1989	Rizal Memorial Sports Complex, Manila, Philippines	
23	Win	21–1–1	Myung Kyu Lee	RTD	6 (10) 3:00	16 Dec 1988	Rizal Memorial Sports Complex, Manila, Philippines	
22	Win	20–1–1	Titing Dignos	UD	12	22 Oct 1988	Rizal Memorial Sports Complex, Manila, Philippines	Retained Philippines Games and Amusements Board(GAB) Filipino minimumweight title
21	Win	19–1–1	Wisanuchai Kiatsonthaya	TKO	2 (10)	1 Sep 1988	Rizal Memorial Sports Complex, Manila, Philippines	
20	Win	18–1–1	Sang Yun Hang	KO	7 (10)	10 Jun 1988	Araneta Coliseum, Barangay Cubao, Quezon City, Philippines	
19	Loss	17–1–1	Samuth Sithnaruepol	TKO	11 (15) 2:11	24 Mar 1988	Rajadamnern Stadium, Bangkok, Thailand	For vacant IBF minimumweight title;Stoppage win for Sithnaruepol after Lucas was deemed unfit to Continue from a Cut over his Right eye Caused by a Punch.
18	Win	17–0–1	Rizaldy Ocampo	TKO	6 (12) 2:49	28 Oct 1987	Elorde Sports Center, Parañaque City, Philippines	Retained Philippine Games & Amusements Board(GAB) Filipino minimumweight title
17	Win	16–0–1	Boy Selda	TKO	9 (10) 2:25	3 Jul 1987	Del Monte Cockpit, Malabon City, Philippines	
16	Win	15–0–1	Boy Selda	TD	4 (10)	6 Mar 1987	Del Monte Cockpit, Malabon City, Philippines	
15	Win	14–0–1	Jun Afable	UD	12	8 Nov 1986	Manila Midtown Ramada Hotel - Malate, Malate, Manila, Philippines	Won Philippine Games & Amusements Board(GAB) Filipino minimumweight title
14	Win	13–0–1	Jun Altarejos	UD	10	5 Jul 1986	University of Life Training & Recreational Arena(ULTRA), Pasig City, Philippines	
13	Win	12–0–1	Robert Palarit	TD	8 (10)	21 Feb 1986	University of Life Training & Recreational Arena(ULTRA), Pasig City, Philippines	
12	Draw	11–0–1	Rex Rapiso	TD	3 (10)	20 Dec 1985	Tayuman, District of Santa Cruz, Manila, Philippines	
11	Win	11–0	Ed Hemo	UD	10	26 Oct 1985	Barangay Santa Quiteria, Caloocan City, Philippines	
10	Win	10–0	Tito Abella	UD	10	30 Aug 1985	District of Novaliches, Quezon City, Philippines	
9	Win	9–0	Robert Palarit	UD	10	27 Jul 1985	Malabon City, Metro Manila, Philippines	
8	Win	8–0	Lou Marabe Jr.	UD	8	1 Jun 1985	Barangay Dampalit, Malabon City, Philippines	
7	Win	7–0	Steve Ponan	TKO	7 (8)	8 May 1985	Del Monte Cockpit, Malabon City, Philippines	
6	Win	6–0	Felipe Brazil	UD	6	32 Aug 1984	Tayuman, District of Santa Cruz, Manila, Philippines	
5	Win	5–0	Danny Duran	UD	6	27 Jul 1984	Tayuman, District of Santa Cruz, Manila, Philippines	
4	Win	4–0	Leonardo Saonoy	TKO	1 (6)	27 Apr 1984	Tayuman, District of Santa Cruz, Manila, Philippines	
3	Win	3–0	Mohamed Raffi	TKO	3 (4)	31 Mar 1984	Malabon City, Metro Manila, Philippines	
2	Win	2–0	Felipe Brazil	UD	4	18 Feb 1984	Malabon City, Metro Manila, Philippines	
1	Win	1–0	Alex DeLaFlor	UD	4	11 Nov 1983	Tayuman, District of Santa Cruz, Manila, Philippines	Professional Debut
