= Toto Pongsawang =

Thai Muay Thai fighter and professional boxer

Toto Por.Pongsawang
- Born: Chamlong Thamwiyot; 1968 (age 57–58); Kosum Phisai, Maha Sarakham, Thailand
- Native name: จำลอง ธรรมวิยศ
- Other names: Toto Kangwalprai (โตโต้ กังวาลไพร)
- Nickname: Lord of Miracle (จอมปาฏิหารย์)
- Division: Mini Flyweight; Light Flyweight; Flyweight
- Style: Muay Thai (Muay Mat / Muay Bouk)
- Stance: Southpaw

Professional boxing record
- Total: 13
- Wins: 10
- By knockout: 3
- Losses: 3
- By knockout: 3
- Draws: 0
- No contests: 0

Other information
- Boxing record from BoxRec

Chamlong Thamwiyot (Thai: จำลอง ธรรมวิยศ; born 1968), known professionally as Toto Por.Pongsawang or Toto Pongsawang (Thai: โตโต้ ป.พงษ์สว่าง, โตโต้ พงษ์สว่าง), is a Thai retired Muay Thai fighter and professional boxer. He defeated multiple elite fighters in Muay Thai before transitioning to boxing and challenging for a WBC Mini Flyweight world title.

== Biography & career ==
Toto had a reputation for being a Muay Thai in Isan region under the name "Toto Kangwalprai" (โตโต้ กังวาลไพร). Later, his manager Songphol "Ja Tu" Pongsawang led him to a regular at the Lumpinee Boxing Stadium, Bangkok under a promoter Songchai Rattanasuban. He was better known for defeating the hot-tempered fighter Pongsiri "Rambo" Por Ruamrudee in the second round with elbow strikes and knocked outPairojnoi "Bloody Steel" Sor Siamchai in the final round even before that, when he was almost defeated. That is why he was nicknamed "Lord of Miracle" by Muay Thai fans.

Later, Songphol had him change to a professional career. It's intended that to fight just three times and then become a world champion like a legendary Saensak Muangsurin. He made a total of five wins. On September 19, 1993, he faced Ricardo "El Finito" López a WBC Strawweight champion holder at Capitol City Discothèque, Ratchadaphisek Road, Bangkok. As a result, he was defeated by TKO (referee stoppage) in the 11th round with a very injured face although he can punched López's mouthguard bounce off.

Between 1993 and 1995, he continued to fight five more times, losing only once in the Philippines. In 1996, he lost again and his final fight was in 1997, where he was defeated.

After Ratanapol Sor Vorapin lost IBF Mini flyweight title to Zolani Petelo in late 1997, Songphol announced that Toto would challenge Petelo but then it didn't happen, until Songphol quit being a promoter. He returned to Muay Thai again although won two times fight of the year, one of them was a fight with Rambaa Somdet, but unsuccessfully like old so finally retired.

== Retirement ==
After retirement, Toto works a lot because he hasn't much money as labourer, auto mechanic, furniture maker, or assistant restaurant manager. Today, his right eye is completely blind believed to be the result of a fight with López in 1993.

== Professional boxing record ==
13 fights	10 wins	3 losses
By knockout	3	3
By decision	7	0
Draws	0	

No.	Result	Record	Opponent	Type	Round, time	Date	Location	Notes
13	Win	10–3	Teddy Puriro	PTS	8 (8)	Jun 22, 1997	Ang Thong, Thailand	
12	Loss	9–3	Ramil Gevero	TKO	1	Sep 29, 1996	Selabhumi, Roi-Et, Thailand	
11	Loss	9–2	Ric Magramo	TKO	4	Sep 30, 1995	Ninoy Aquino Stadium, District of Malate, Manila, Philippines	
10	Win	9–1	Edwin Talita	UD	10 (10)	Jul 8, 1995	Rangsit, Thailand	
9	Win	8–1	Texas Gomez	PTS	10 (10)	Apr 29, 1995	Petchaburi, Thailand	
8	Win	7–1	Alpong Navaja	PTS	10 (10)	Dec 31, 1994	The Capital City Discotheque, Bangkok, Thailand	
7	Win	6–1	Jaime Aliguin	PTS	10 (10)	Mar 13, 1994	Omnoi Stadium, Samut Sakhon, Thailand	
6	Win	5–1	Eric Chavez	SD	10 (10)	Dec 21, 1993	Pathum Thani, Thailand	
5	Loss	4–1	Ricardo López	TKO	11 (12), 2:30	Sep 19, 1993	Capitol City Discotheque, Bangkok, Thailand	For the WBC mini flyweight title
4	Win	4–0	Manny Melchor	PTS	10 (10)	Apr 9, 1993	Bangkok, Thailand	
3	Win	3–0	Joseph Paden	KO	4	Jan 24, 1993	Bangkok, Thailand	
2	Win	2–0	Ric Magramo	KO	8	Nov 29, 1992	Imperial World Center, Samut Prakan, Thailand	
1	Win	1–0	Raul Terado	KO	2	Oct 3, 1992	Bangkok, Thailand	

== Muay Thai record ==
Muay Thai Record (Incomplete)
Date	Result	Opponent	Event	Location	Method	Round	Time
?	Win	(Thailand) Rambaa Somdet	Omnoi Stadium	Thailand	KO (Left Elbow)	2	
1992-07-31	Win	(Thailand) Chartchainoi Chaorai-Oi	Lumpinee Stadium	Bangkok, Thailand	KO (Punches + Low kicks)	2	
1992-02-07	Win	(Thailand) Chatchai Paiseetong	Lumpinee Stadium	Bangkok, Thailand	Decision	5	3:00
?	Win	(Thailand) Chingchai Sakdaroon	Lumpinee Stadium	Bangkok, Thailand	KO (Low kicks)		
1991-10-25	Loss	(Thailand) Lamnamoon Sor.Sumalee	Lumpinee Stadium	Bangkok, Thailand	Decision	5	3:00
1991-09-21	Loss	(Thailand) Khanunphet JohnnyGym	Lumpinee Stadium	Bangkok, Thailand	KO	2	
1991-07-30	Loss	(Thailand) Thongchai Tor.Silachai	Lumpinee Stadium	Bangkok, Thailand	Decision	5	3:00
1991-04-30	Win	(Thailand) Thongchai Tor.Silachai	Lumpinee Stadium	Bangkok, Thailand	Decision	5	3:00
1991-02-23	Draw	(Thailand) Samanchai Singkhiri	Lumpinee Stadium	Bangkok, Thailand	Decision	5	3:00
1991-	Win	(Thailand) Thongchai Tor.Silachai	Lumpinee Stadium	Bangkok, Thailand	Decision	5	3:00
1990-12-	Loss	(Thailand) Kompayak Singmanee	Lumpinee Stadium	Bangkok, Thailand	Decision	5	3:00
1990-11-09	Loss	(Thailand) Chandet Sor.Prantalay	Lumpinee Stadium	Bangkok, Thailand	Decision	5	3:00
1990-09-28	Win	(Thailand) Kruekchai Sor.Kettalingchan	Lumpinee Stadium	Bangkok, Thailand	Decision	5	3:00
1990-	Win	(Thailand) Kompayak Singmanee	Lumpinee Stadium	Bangkok, Thailand	Decision	5	3:00
1990-05-01	Loss	(Thailand) Mathee Jadeepitak	Lumpinee Stadium	Bangkok, Thailand	Decision	5	3:00
1990-03-06	Loss	(Thailand) Pairojnoi Sor.Siamchai	Lumpinee Stadium	Bangkok, Thailand	Decision	5	3:00
1990-02-10	Loss	(Thailand) Chainoi Muangsurin	Lumpinee Stadium	Bangkok, Thailand	Decision	5	3:00
1990-01-19	Win	(Thailand) Pairojnoi Sor.Siamchai	Lumpinee Stadium	Bangkok, Thailand	KO (High kick)	5	
1989-12-27	Loss	(Thailand) Namkabuan Nongkeepahuyuth	Rajadamnern Stadium	Bangkok, Thailand	Decision	5	3:00
1989-11-11	Win	(Thailand) Paruhatlek Sitchunthong	Sanam Chan Boxing Stadium	Nakhon Pathom, Thailand	Decision	5	3:00
1989-10-06	Win	(Thailand) Hippy Singmanee	Lumpinee Stadium	Bangkok, Thailand	Decision	5	3:00
1989-09-05	Loss	(Thailand) Veeraphol Sahaprom	Lumpinee Stadium	Bangkok, Thailand	KO	2	
1989-08-08	Win	(Thailand) Chainoi Muangsurin	Lumpinee Stadium	Bangkok, Thailand	TKO (Doctor stoppage)	4	
1989-06-30	Win	(Thailand) Thongsabad Piyaphan	Lumpinee Stadium	Bangkok, Thailand	TKO	3	
1989-06-06	Loss	(Thailand) Chainoi Muangsurin	Lumpinee Stadium	Bangkok, Thailand	Decision	5	3:00
1989-05-02	Loss	(Thailand) Pongsiri Por.Ruamrudee	Lumpinee Stadium	Bangkok, Thailand	Decision	5	3:00
1989-03-29	Loss	(Thailand) Paruhatlek Sitchunthong	Lumpinee Stadium	Bangkok, Thailand	Decision	5	3:00
1989-02-11	Loss	(Thailand) Pongsiri Por.Ruamrudee		Nakhon Ratchasima, Thailand	Decision	5	3:00
1989-01-06	Win	(Thailand) Seesod Keatchidchanok	Lumpinee Stadium	Bangkok, Thailand	TKO	3	
1988-12-02	Win	(Thailand) Pairojnoi Sor.Siamchai	Lumpinee Stadium	Bangkok, Thailand	Decision	5	3:00
1988-11-25	Win	(Thailand) Nuathoranee Sitchainarin	Lumpinee Stadium	Bangkok, Thailand	KO (Punch)	4	
1988-11-17	Win	(Thailand) Pannoi Chuwatana	Rajadamnern Stadium	Bangkok, Thailand	Decision	5	3:00
1988-10-28	Loss	(Thailand) Phuengluang Kiatanan		Bangkok, Thailand	Decision	5	3:00
1988-09-27	Win	(Thailand) Morakot Sor.Tamarangsri	Lumpinee Stadium	Bangkok, Thailand	KO	3	
1988-08-16	Win	(Thailand) Phuengluang Kiatanan		Bangkok, Thailand	KO	5	
1988-06-28	Loss	(Thailand) Pongsiri Por.Ruamrudee	Lumpinee Stadium	Bangkok, Thailand	Decision	5	3:00
1988-05-27	Win	(Thailand) Amnatsak Sor.Sinsawat	Lumpinee Stadium	Bangkok, Thailand	Decision	5	3:00
1988-03-15	Loss	(Thailand) Saeksan Sitjomthong	Lumpinee Stadium	Bangkok, Thailand	Decision	5	3:00
1988-02-02	Loss	(Thailand) Pairojnoi Sor.Siamchai	Lumpinee Stadium	Bangkok, Thailand	Decision	5	3:00
1987-12-29	Loss	(Thailand) Pairojnoi Sor.Siamchai	Lumpinee Stadium	Bangkok, Thailand	Decision	5	3:00
1987-09-01	Loss	(Thailand) Karuhat Sor.Supawan	Lumpinee Stadium	Bangkok, Thailand	Decision	5	3:00
1987-07-31	Win	(Thailand) Pongsiri Por.Ruamrudee	Lumpinee Stadium	Bangkok, Thailand	KO	2	
1986-09-01	Loss	(Thailand) Karuhat Sor.Supawan	Lumpinee Stadium	Bangkok, Thailand	Decision	5	3:00
Legend: Win Loss Draw/No contest Notes
