= Eduardo Vallejo =

American boxer

Eduardo Vallejo (born August 2, 1968) is a Mexican-American former boxer who once fought for the World Boxing Organization's world Light-Flyweight title. He was also known as Eddie, and was sometimes introduced as Eddie Vallejo.

== Early life ==
Vallejo was born in Mexico. As an adult, and in order to find more professional bouts, he moved to Tyler, Texas.

== Professional boxing career ==
Vallejo started his professional boxing career on June 15, 1990, losing to Pauline Pumarejo by a four-round points decision in Matamoros, Tamaulipas. His next fight was his first fight abroad as a professional, when he traveled to London, England, to box Mickey Cantwell on January 21, 1991, losing that bout by knockout in round 4.

Vallejo's first victory as a professional came during his third fight, when he defeated Amado Morado, on September 10, 1991, by a four-round decision at McAllen, Texas, United States. He then lost to Aureo Dominguez and Hector Lara, both by 4 round decision, and both in Texas.

On March 20, 1992, Vallejo got his second win when he outpointed Rodolfo Robles over 6 rounds in Longview, Texas. Robles was 0-2 coming into their fight. Vallejo then returned to the United Kingdom, where he faced future world champion Paul Weir on April 27 of 1992 at the Forte Crest Hotel, in Glasgow, Scotland, losing by a second-round knockout.

== World title fight ==
Despite having a record, until then, of 2 wins and 5 losses, Vallejo's next bout was an eliminator for a world championship fight. He fought Jesus Vera, himself making his professional boxing debut, on July 18, 1992, in Oklahoma City, Oklahoma, and scored a first-round knockout, which turned out to be the first and only knockout victory in Vallejo's professional boxing career, and also his last win.

Next, Vallejo traveled to San Juan, Puerto Rico, where he opposed Josué Camacho for the WBO's vacant world Junior-Flyweight crown, at the Caribe Hilton Hotel. The bout was fought only 13 days after the win against Vera, and on July 31, 1992, Vallejo lost to Camacho by a fifth-round knockout.

== Retirement ==
Vallejo continued fighting after the Camacho loss for two more years, but he lost all his fights thereafter. Among those fights, there was a first-round knockout defeat at the hands of future world champion Alex Sánchez in Camuy, Puerto Rico, and a loss to Paul Oulden at the Eastern Cape, South Africa.

== Record ==
Vallejo's record was of 3 wins and 10 losses in 13 bouts as a professional, 1 win by knockout, giving him one of the lowest win totals in boxing history for a world title fight participant as well as one of the lowest win percentages among world title fight participants.

== See also ==
- List of Mexicans
