= Ratanapol =

Ratanapol (Thai: รัตนพล) is a Thai given name and surname. Notable people with the name include:

- Anat Ratanapol (born 1947), Thai sprinter
- Ratanapol Sor Vorapin (born 1974), Thai professional boxer
