= Ricardo López (boxer) =

Mexican boxer (born 1966)

Personal information
- Nickname: El Finito ("The Fine One")
- Born: Ricardo López Nava; July 25, 1966 (age 60) Cuernavaca, Morelos, Mexico
- Height: 5 ft 5 in (165 cm)
- Weight: Mini flyweight; Light flyweight

Boxing career
- Reach: 64 in (163 cm)
- Stance: Orthodox

Boxing record
- Total fights: 52
- Wins: 51
- Win by KO: 38
- Draws: 1

Ricardo López Nava (born July 25, 1966) is a Mexican former professional boxer who competed from 1985 to 2001. He was a two-weight world champion, having held the WBC mini flyweight title from 1990 to 1998, defending it against a record-breaking 21 opponents; the WBA and WBO mini flyweight titles between 1997 and 1998; and the IBF junior flyweight title from 1999 until his retirement in 2001. He is one of just fifteen world boxing champions to retire without a loss. He is the father of undefeated former boxer Alonso López.

== Amateur career ==
López would win four consecutive Guantes de Oro de México Championships from 1981 to 1984. His record has been reported as 37–1, while other sources say he was undefeated.

== Professional career ==
On January 18, 1985, Ricardo made his professional debut at the age of 18 by scoring a third-round knockout of Rogelio Hernandez. He accumulated a record of 26–0 before receiving his first shot at a world title.

=== WBC mini flyweight champion ===
On October 25, 1990, López defeated WBC and lineal mini flyweight champion Hideyuki Ohashi of Japan via fifth-round knockout to win his first world title. In 1991, he defeated Korean former champion Kyung-Yung Lee (20–1) via Unanimous Decision. In 1992, he defended his title against Pretty Boy Lucas (22–2–2) of the Philippines via Unanimous Decision and Rocky Lin (14–0) of Taiwan via TKO. López started 1993 with a stoppage victory over amateur standout Kwang-Soo Oh and followed it with a knockout over future two-time champion Saman Sorjaturong of Thailand. Sorjaturong was knocked down once in the first round and twice in the second round before the referee stopped the bout.

Later that year, he knocked out Filipino former champion Manny Melchor in the eleventh round. In his tenth title defense, López defeated future champion Kermin Guardia (21–0) by unanimous decision. He knocked out Surachai Saengmorakot (10–0) in the first round of his next bout. In 1995, he defeated Andy Tabanas (30–2) of the Philippines via twelfth-round knockout. In his next bout, he defeated another Filipino boxer and founder of the famous "Ala Gym" Ala Villamor (29–1–1) by knockout. In early 1997, there had been a plan in the works for López to move up in weight to challenge junior flyweight champion Michael Carbajal, however, the plan was upended when Carbajal lost his title in an upset loss. López would go on to defend his title against Mongkol Charoen (20–1).

=== WBO and WBA mini flyweight champion ===
In his 20th world title bout, López unified his WBC title by defeating WBO mini flyweight champion Alex Sánchez (25–1) of Puerto Rico via fifth-round knockout. After López won the WBO title, he said he wanted to give his championship belt to his father, who is a boxing fan. His statement to Mexican newspapers prompted the organization to take away López' title and sanction a match between Eric Jamili and Mickey Cantwell to fill the vacancy. "It was enough for us," said the WBO president, Francisco Valcarcel, of López' intention. "That's a public resignation." Dwight Manley, López' agent, said López should have had a hearing before the WBO took away his title. "He got no letter, he got no telephone call," Manley said.

On March 7, 1998, López fought undefeated WBA mini flyweight champion Rosendo Álvarez to a technical draw after referee Arthur Mercante Sr. stopped the contest following an accidental clash of heads in the seventh round. This fight was part of undercard featured Julio César Chávez vs. Miguel Ángel González for the vacant WBC super lightweight title. In the rematch, Álvarez came in over the mini flyweight limit and was subsequently stripped of his title. Due to the weight disparity, the fight was in jeopardy. However, López chose to proceed with the contest against the heavier Álvarez with only López eligible to claim the now vacant WBA title. López defeated Álvarez by split decision to claim his third mini flyweight title. After the fight, he vacated his titles in order to move up in weight.

=== IBF junior flyweight champion ===
In his first bout at junior flyweight, López defeated IBF champion Will Grigsby of the U.S. by Unanimous Decision. He defended his title against former champion Ratanapol Sor Vorapin by knocked out in the 3rd Round. On September 29, 2001, López knocked out Zolani Petelo in the eighth round, who had recently vacated his IBF mini flyweight title, the only mini flyweight title that López had not claimed before moving up in weight. He officially announced his retirement from boxing at a press conference on November 27, 2002, in Mexico City.

=== Retirement ===
Ricardo López was the seventh male boxing champion to retire undefeated. With 26 successful title fights, he also shares the record for most consecutive title bouts without a loss with Joe Louis and Floyd Mayweather Jr. This streak began with his knockout of Hideyuki Ohashi to win the WBC mini flyweight title in 1990 and ended with his knockout of Zolani Petelo to defend his IBF junior flyweight title in 2001. Ricardo only had one draw, which came in his 48th bout against Rosendo Álvarez in 1998 and was then avenged in their rematch eight months later. His final record was 51 wins (38 knockouts), 0 losses, and 1 draw.

== Life after boxing ==
López now works as a boxing broadcaster for the Mexican Televisa network.

=== Honors ===
López was inducted into the International Boxing Hall of Fame and World Boxing Hall of Fame in 2007.

Ricardo "El Finito" López was voted as the greatest Strawweight and Light Flyweight Champion ever by the Houston Boxing Hall Of Fame in 2014, while BoxRec rates him the best Minimumweight of all time. The Houston Boxing Hall Of Fame is a voting body composed entirely of current and former fighters.

== Professional boxing record ==
52 fights	51 wins	0 losses
By knockout	38	0
By decision	13	0
Draws	1	

No.	Result	Record	Opponent	Type	Round, time	Date	Location	Notes
52	Win	51–0–1	Zolani Petelo	KO	8 (12), 1:32	Sep 29, 2001	Madison Square Garden, New York City, New York, U.S.	Retained IBF junior flyweight title
51	Win	50–0–1	Ratanapol Sor Vorapin	TKO	3 (12), 2:11	Dec 2, 2000	Mandalay Bay, Paradise, Nevada, U.S.	Retained IBF junior flyweight title
50	Win	49–0–1	Will Grigsby	UD	12	Oct 2, 1999	Hilton Hotel, Las Vegas, Nevada, U.S.	Won IBF junior flyweight title
49	Win	48–0–1	Rosendo Álvarez	SD	12	Nov 13, 1998	Hilton Hotel, Las Vegas, Nevada, U.S.	Retained WBC mini flyweight title; Won vacant WBA mini flyweight title
48	Draw	47–0–1	Rosendo Álvarez	TD	8 (12)	Mar 7, 1998	Plaza de Toros México, Mexico City, Mexico	Retained WBC mini flyweight title; For WBA mini flyweight title
47	Win	47–0	Alex Sánchez	TKO	5 (12), 1:58	Aug 23, 1997	Madison Square Garden, New York City, New York, U.S.	Retained WBC mini flyweight title; Won WBO mini flyweight title
46	Win	46–0	Mongkol Charoen	UD	12	Mar 29, 1997	Hilton Hotel, Las Vegas, Nevada, U.S.	Retained WBC mini flyweight title
45	Win	45–0	Myung-Sup Park	TKO	1 (12), 2:22	Dec 7, 1996	Fantasy Springs Casino, Indio, California, U.S.	Retained WBC mini flyweight title
44	Win	44–0	Morgan Ndumo	TKO	6 (12), 0:55	Nov 9, 1996	MGM Grand Garden Arena, Paradise, Nevada, U.S.	Retained WBC mini flyweight title
43	Win	43–0	Kitichai Preecha	TKO	3 (12), 1:46	Jun 29, 1996	Fantasy Springs Casino, Indio, California, U.S.	Retained WBC mini flyweight title
42	Win	42–0	Edito “Ala” Villamor	TKO	8 (12), 0:40	Mar 16, 1996	MGM Grand Garden Arena, Paradise, Nevada, U.S.	Retained WBC mini flyweight title
41	Win	41–0	Andy Tabanas	TKO	12 (12), 2:45	Apr 1, 1995	Buffalo Bill's Star Arena, Primm, Nevada, U.S.	Retained WBC mini flyweight title
40	Win	40–0	Yamil Caraballo	TKO	1 (12), 1:10	Dec 10, 1994	Estadio de Béisbol Monterrey, Monterrey, Mexico	Retained WBC mini flyweight title
39	Win	39–0	Javier Varguez	TKO	8 (12), 1:33	Nov 12, 1994	Plaza de Toros México, Mexico City, Mexico	Retained WBC mini flyweight title
38	Win	38–0	Surachai Saengmorakot	TKO	1 (12), 1:53	Sep 17, 1994	MGM Grand Garden Arena, Paradise, Nevada, U.S.	Retained WBC mini flyweight title
37	Win	37–0	Kermin Guardia	UD	12	May 7, 1994	MGM Grand Garden Arena, Paradise, Nevada, U.S.	Retained WBC mini flyweight title
36	Win	36–0	Manny Melchor	KO	11 (12), 2:00	Dec 18, 1993	Caesars Tahoe, Stateline, Nevada, U.S.	Retained WBC mini flyweight title
35	Win	35–0	Toto Pongsawang	TKO	11 (12), 2:30	Sep 19, 1993	Capitol City Discotheque, Bangkok, Thailand	Retained WBC mini flyweight title
34	Win	34–0	Saman Sorjaturong	TKO	2 (12), 2:45	Jul 3, 1993	Parque la Junta, Nuevo Laredo, Mexico	Retained WBC mini flyweight title
33	Win	33–0	Kwang-Soo Oh	TKO	9 (12)	Jan 31, 1993	Indoor Gymnasium, Pohang, South Korea	Retained WBC mini flyweight title
32	Win	32–0	Rocky Lin	TKO	2 (12)	Oct 11, 1992	Korakuen Hall, Tokyo, Japan	Retained WBC mini flyweight title
31	Win	31–0	Singprasert Kittikasem	TKO	5 (12)	Aug 22, 1992	Auditorio Americo Villareal, Ciudad Madero, Mexico	Retained WBC mini flyweight title
30	Win	30–0	Pretty Boy Lucas	UD	12	Mar 16, 1992	Fronton Mexico, Mexico City, Mexico	Retained WBC mini flyweight title
29	Win	29–0	Kyung-Yun Lee	UD	12	Dec 21, 1991	Jamsil Arena, Seoul, South Korea	Retained WBC mini flyweight title
28	Win	28–0	Kimio Hirano	TKO	8 (12)	May 19, 1991	Kusanagi Gymnasium, Shizuoka, Japan	Retained WBC mini flyweight title
27	Win	27–0	Hideyuki Ohashi	TKO	5 (12)	Oct 25, 1990	Korakuen Hall, Tokyo, Japan	Won WBC mini flyweight title
26	Win	26–0	Francisco Montiel	UD	10 (10)	Jun 29, 1990	Mexico City, Mexico	
25	Win	25–0	Jorge Rivera	KO	8 (12)	Mar 15, 1990	Fairmont Hotel, Dallas, Texas, U.S.	Retained WBC Continental Americas mini flyweight title
24	Win	24–0	Rey Hernandez	KO	12 (12)	Nov 7, 1989	Arena México, Mexico City, Mexico	Won WBC Continental Americas mini flyweight title
23	Win	23–0	Jose Luis Zepeda	TKO	7 (10)	Aug 26, 1989	Mexico City, Mexico	
22	Win	22–0	Raymundo Ricardo Mendoza	KO	5	Aug 4, 1989	Tulancingo, Mexico	
21	Win	21–0	Abel Andres	KO	2	Jul 8, 1989	León, Mexico	
20	Win	20–0	Jorge Torres	KO	8	May 30, 1989	Guasave, Mexico	
19	Win	19–0	Javier Juarez	UD	10 (10)	May 6, 1989	Mexico City, Mexico	
18	Win	18–0	Ubaldo Gonzalez	TKO	6	Jan 27, 1989	Mazatlán, Mexico	
17	Win	17–0	Ismael Benitez	UD	10 (10)	Nov 12, 1988	Mexico City, Mexico	
16	Win	16–0	Evaristo Morales	KO	5	Aug 27, 1988	Mexico City, Mexico	
15	Win	15–0	Fermin Rivera	KO	3	Jul 30, 1988	Zacapu, Mexico	
14	Win	14–0	Javier Alonso	UD	10 (10)	Aug 18, 1987	Mexico City, Mexico	
13	Win	13–0	Alex Mollado	KO	1	Jul 31, 1987	Acapulco, Mexico	
12	Win	12–0	Eduardo Ramirez	UD	10 (10)	Apr 18, 1987	Mexico City, Mexico	
11	Win	11–0	Herminio Ramirez	UD	10 (10)	Dec 8, 1986	Tlalnepantla, Mexico	
10	Win	10–0	Jorge Flores	KO	2	Oct 6, 1986	Ciudad Nezahualcóyotl, Mexico	
9	Win	9–0	Herminio Ramirez	UD	10 (10)	Jul 28, 1986	Ciudad Nezahualcóyotl, Mexico	
8	Win	8–0	Santiago Huizar	KO	2	May 1, 1986	Zacatecas City, Mexico	
7	Win	7–0	Reyes Mendez	KO	1	Mar 24, 1986	Ciudad Nezahualcóyotl, Mexico	
6	Win	6–0	Narciso Panchi	KO	5	Aug 2, 1985	Arena Naucalpan, Mexico City, Mexico	
5	Win	5–0	Manuel Martinez	KO	2	Jun 27, 1985	San Luis Potosí City, Mexico	
4	Win	4–0	Javier Dominguez	KO	3	Mar 8, 1985	Cuernavaca, Morelos, Mexico	
3	Win	3–0	Sebastian Reyes	KO	2	Feb 18, 1985	Cuernavaca, Morelos, Mexico	
2	Win	2–0	Antonio Arciniega	KO	2	Feb 6, 1985	Cuernavaca, Morelos, Mexico	
1	Win	1–0	Rogelio Hernandez	KO	3 (4)	Jan 18, 1985	Cuernavaca, Morelos, Mexico	

== Titles in boxing ==
=== Major world titles ===
- WBA mini flyweight champion (105 lbs)
- WBC mini flyweight champion (105 lbs)
- WBO mini flyweight champion (105 lbs)
- IBF light flyweight champion (108 lbs)

=== Regional/International titles ===
- WBC Continental Americas minimumweight champion (105 lbs)

== See also ==
- List of minimumweight boxing champions
- List of WBC world champions
- List of WBO world champions
- List of WBA world champions
- List of IBF world champions
- List of Mexican boxing world champions
- List of people from Morelos

Sporting positions
Major world boxing titles
Preceded by Hideyuki Ohashi	WBC mini flyweight champion October 25, 1990 – September 28, 1999; Stripped	Vacant Title next held by Wandee Singwancha
Preceded by Alex Sánchez	WBO mini flyweight champion August 23, 1997 – August 1997; Stripped	Vacant Title next held by Eric Jamili
Preceded by Rosendo Álvarez	WBA mini flyweight champion November 13, 1998 – July 1999; Vacated	Vacant Title next held by Noel Arambulet
Preceded by Will Grigsby	IBF junior flyweight champion October 2, 1999 – November 27, 2002; Retired	Vacant Title next held by Víctor Burgos
