= Damaen Kelly =

Irish boxer

Personal information
- Nickname: The Wee Man
- Nationality: Irish
- Born: 3 April 1973 (age 53) Belfast, Northern Ireland
- Weight: Flyweight; Super-flyweight; Bantamweight

Boxing career
- Stance: Orthodox

Boxing record
- Total fights: 26
- Wins: 22
- Win by KO: 10
- Losses: 4
Medal record
Men's amateur boxing
Representing Ireland
World Amateur Championships
Bronze medal – third place	1993 Tampere	Flyweight
European Amateur Championships
Bronze medal – third place	1996 Vejle	Flyweight

Damaen Kelly (born 3 April 1973) (also incorrectly known as Damien Kelly) is a British former professional boxer from Belfast, Northern Ireland, who competed from 1997 to 2006. He held the IBO flyweight title from 2000 to 2001 and the IBO super-flyweight title in 2004, and once challenged for the IBF flyweight title in 2003. At regional level, he held the Commonwealth flyweight title from 1998 to 1999; the British flyweight title in 1999; and the European flyweight title in 2000. As an amateur he represented Ireland in the flyweight division, winning bronze medals at the 1993 World Championships and 1996 European Championships, and reached the quarter-finals of the 1996 Summer Olympics in Atlanta, US.

== Background ==
Kelly was born and brought up in Belfast, Northern Ireland.

== Amateur career ==
As an amateur at club level, Kelly fought out of the Holy Trinity Boxing club in the Turf Lodge area of West Belfast. At national level Kelly boxed for Ireland and won the national title five times. During his career fighting for the national team he won a bronze medal at the flyweight division during the 1993 World Championships in Tampere, Finland.

Kelly followed that bronze medal with another bronze medal at the 1996 European Championships in Vejle, Denmark. The bronze medal Kelly won at the European Championship in Vejle gave him automatic qualification for the 1996 Summer Olympics in Atlanta, US, where he reached the quarter-finals.

=== Olympic results ===
Member of the 1996 Irish Olympic Team as a flyweight. His results were:

- Defeated Yuliyan Strogov (Bulgaria) 12–11
- Defeated Hussein Hussein (Australia) 27–20
- Lost to Bulat Jumadilov (Kazakhstan) 6–13

== Professional career ==
=== Debut ===
Kelly, under the mentorship of Mickey Hawkins, then turned professional in September 1997, gaining a victory in his debut fight at the Ulster Hall in Belfast, with a first-round knockout (KO) over Chris Thomas on a card that included Steve Robinson, Julius Francis and fellow Northern Irishman Neil Sinclair.

=== Initial title fights ===
Kelly won his first seven fights, five by KO, before he had a chance to fight for his first title in December 1998 when he challenged Alfonso Zvenyika Lambarda for his Commonwealth flyweight title in Chester, England. Kelly won this fight via points decision (PTS) over twelve rounds.

His next fight was against British flyweight champion Anthony Hana in March 1999. Kelly defeated Hana via PTS to add the British title to his Commonwealth belt. He next fought Keith Knox, who had been knocked out by Lambarda earlier in 1998. Kelly was leading on points when the fight was stopped in the sixth round due to cuts. Kelly had a number of cuts to his hairline and a bad cut above his right eye when the referee stopped the fight sending Kelly to suffer his first defeat as a professional.

Kelly returned to the ring five months later and won the WBC International super-flyweight title against Igor Gerassimov. Kelly quickly added the European flyweight title in February 2000 and the IBO flyweight title in September 2000. Kelly's winning streak continued with a further addition to his record when he added the lightly regarded WBF flyweight title in May 2002.

=== IBF world title fight in Colombia ===
After a win over Jovy Oracion in October 2002, Kelly was then out of the ring for almost a year and only returned in September 2003 to an unexpected fight against Irene Pacheco at the Salón Jumbo del Country Club, Barranquilla, Atlantico, Colombia for the IBF flyweight title.

Kelly was a major underdog going into the fight as Pacheco was highly rated and as, with the exception of a fight against Mike Thomas in the US in 1998, Kelly had never fought as a professional outside Ireland and Britain.

Pacheco proved too strong for Kelly, whose lack of power was highlighted when he was unable to answer the barrage of head and body punches from Pacheco. Kelly was knocked to the floor three times in round six before the fight was stopped in round seven.

=== Cancelled Darchinyan fight ===
Kelly again returned to boxing, now under the guidance of Tommy Gilmour to rebuild his career. After two more wins in his native Belfast, he defeated Jason Booth to win the IBO super-flyweight title. This win lined Kelly up with a fight against Vic Darchinyan, again for the IBF title in November 2005, but this fight fell through after a dispute as to whether the fight should take place in Sydney, Australia or somewhere in Ireland or Great Britain as well as a dispute over the purse. Kelly's future then looked uncertain, although he did face and defeat Ian Napa in Liverpool on the day he was supposed to face Darchinyan, beating Napa on points.

=== Maludrottu controversy ===
In April 2006, Kelly challenged Simone Maludrottu at the Andersonstown Leisure Centre in Belfast. Kelly was attempting to become the first Irishman to capture the European bantamweight title and the first Irish fighter to win the European title at two different weights.

Maludrottu was the naturally bigger man and carried more power, having fought at bantamweight for the majority of his career, however Kelly possessed the faster hands and higher technical ability. Kelly's footwork and accurate jabs frustrated Maludrottu as Kelly stayed out of range, leaving him unable to make his superior power pay. Despite this, Maludrottu won an extremely controversial unanimous decision (UD). Punch stats showed that Kelly landed 155 punches while Maludrottu landed only 87, with the vast majority of onlookers believed that Kelly had won a fairly comfortable decision, but the Sardinian was given the verdict by all three judges. Kelly's promoter Tommy Gilmour stated that "that was shameful. It was the biggest robbery I've seen in 35 years of boxing".

In the following rematch in Maludrottu's hometown of Olbia, Sardinia, Italy on 25 November 2006, Maludrottu stopped Kelly inside three rounds after Kelly's trainer Mickey Hawkins threw in the towel. Kelly announced his retirement immediately after the fight stating "the time has come for me to walk away. The defeat on Saturday night just confirmed that to me. Every sportsman comes to a point when they know they are at that stage when it is time to go. I've had a great career with highs and lows and I've achieved an awful lot". This was to be Kelly's last fight, although he was still the number one ranked Irish bantamweight boxer at the time.

== See also ==
- List of boxing triple champions
- List of British flyweight boxing champions
