= Keith Knox (boxer) =

Scottish boxer

Personal information
- Nationality: Scottish
- Born: 20 June 1968 (age 58) Bonnyrigg, Edinburgh, Scotland
- Height: 5 ft 3 in (1.60 m)
- Weight: Light flyweight; Flyweight

Boxing career

Boxing record
- Total fights: 23
- Wins: 13
- Win by KO: 4
- Losses: 8
- Draws: 2
- No contests: 0

Keith Knox (born 20 June 1967), is a Scottish former professional boxer who competed from 1994 to 2001. He held the British and Commonwealth flyweight titles in 1999, and once challenged for the IBO light flyweight title in 2001.

== Amateur career ==
Knox won the 1992 Amateur Boxing Association British flyweight title, when boxing out of the Bonnybrigg ABC.

== Professional career ==
Knox made his professional debut on 4 March 1994 with a fourth-round knockout win over Ian Bailie.

On 20 November 1995, Knox for Louis Veitch for the vacant BBBofC Scottish Area flyweight title, winning via sixth round technical knockout (TKO).

His next fight was on 21 March 1996, against Mickey Cantwell (10-3-1) for the vacant British flyweight title. Knox suffered his first career defeat, losing by a twelve round points decision.

On 13 September 1996, Knox challenged undefeated Danish fighter Jesper Jensen (17-0) for the EBU European flyweight title, losing by unanimous decision. Two judges scored the bout 117-112, while the third scored it 117-113.

Knox again challenged for the vacant British flyweight title on 27 January 1997, against undefeated Ady Lewis (11-0), losing again by points decision.

His next title attempt came on 1 June 1998, against Zimbabwean Alfonso Zvenyika Lambarda (10-6), losing by eighth-round TKO.

On 22 May 1999, Knox challenged undefeated British and Commonwealth flyweight champion Damaen Kelly (9-0) at the Maysfield Leisure Centre in Belfast, Northern Ireland. The fight was stopped after the end of round six due to Kelly suffering cuts above both eyes, crowning Knox the British and Commonwealth flyweight champion via sixth round TKO.

Knox defended his titles against Nottingham fighter Jason Booth (15-1) on 16 November 1999. Knox lost the fight, and his titles, when the referee waved off the fight in the tenth round after Booth landed a clean right uppercut.

On 20 March 2001, Knox fought Colombian IBO light flyweight champion Jose Garcia Bernal (24-4-1) at the Bellahouston Leisure Centre In Glasgow, Scotland. Knox lost by split decision (115-114, 113-117, 113-116) in what would be the final fight of his professional career.

== Professional boxing record ==
23 fights	13 wins	8 losses
By knockout	4	2
By decision	9	6
Draws	2	

No.	Result	Record	Opponent	Type	Round, time	Date	Location	Notes
23	Loss	13–8–2	(Colombia) Jose Garcia Bernal	SD	12	20 Mar 2001	(United Kingdom) Bellahouston Leisure Centre, Glasgow, Scotland	For IBO light flyweight title
22	Loss	13–7–2	(United Kingdom) Delroy Spencer	PTS	6	2 Dec 2000	(United Kingdom) York Hall, London, England	
21	Win	13–6–2	(United Kingdom) Colin Moffett	TKO	3 (6)	5 Jun 2000	(United Kingdom) Posthouse Hotel, Glasgow Scotland	
20	Win	12–6–2	(United Kingdom) Jamie Evans	PTS	6	20 Mar 2000	(United Kingdom) St. Andrew's Sporting Club, Glasgow Scotland	
19	Loss	11–6–2	(United Kingdom) Jason Booth	TKO	10 (12)	16 Oct 1999	(United Kingdom) Maysfield Leisure Centre, Belfast, Northern Ireland	Lost British and Commonwealth flyweight titles
18	Win	11–5–2	(United Kingdom) Damaen Kelly	TKO	6 (12)	22 May 1999	(United Kingdom) Maysfield Leisure Centre, Belfast, Northern Ireland	Won British and Commonwealth flyweight titles
17	Win	10–5–2	(United Kingdom) Shaun Norman	PTS	8	22 Mar 1999	(United Kingdom) Forte Post House Hotel, Glasgow, Scotland	
16	Loss	9–5–2	(Zimbabwe) Alfonso Zvenyika Lambarda	TKO	8 (10)	1 Jun 1998	(United Kingdom) Forte Post House Hotel, Glasgow, Scotland	For Commonwealth flyweight title
15	Win	9–4–2	(United Kingdom) Jason Whitaker	PTS	6	13 Feb 1998	(United Kingdom) Sports Centre, Barrhead, Scotland	
14	Loss	8–4–2	(United Kingdom) Jason Thomas	PTS	8	25 Oct 1997	(United Kingdom) Deeside Leisure Centre, Queensferry, Wales	
13	Win	8–3–2	(United Kingdom) Anthony Hanna	PTS	6	2 Jun 1997	(United Kingdom) Forte Post House Hotel, Glasgow, Scotland	
12	Loss	7–3–2	(United Kingdom) Ady Lewis	PTS	12	27 Jan 1997	(United Kingdom) St. Andrew's Sporting Club, Glasgow, Scotland	For vacant British flyweight title
11	Loss	7–2–2	(Denmark) Jesper Jensen	UD	12	13 Sep 1996	Teater & Kongrescenter, Ringsted, Denmark	For EBU flyweight title
10	Loss	7–1–2	(United Kingdom) Mickey Cantwell	PTS	12	21 Mar 1996	(United Kingdom) Elephant & Castle Centre, London, England	For vacant British flyweight title
9	Win	7–0–2	(United Kingdom) Louis Veitch	TKO	6 (10)	20 Nov 1995	(United Kingdom) St. Andrew's Sporting Club, Glasgow, Scotland	Won vacant BBBofC Scottish Area flyweight title
8	Win	6–0–2	(United Kingdom) Shaun Norman	PTS	8	18 Sep 1995	(United Kingdom) St. Andrew's Sporting Club, Glasgow, Scotland	
7	Draw	5–0–2	(United Kingdom) Louis Veitch	PTS	6	5 Apr 1995	(United Kingdom) Magnum Centre, Irvine, Scotland	
6	Draw	5–0–1	(United Kingdom) Lyndon Kershaw	PTS	6	20 Feb 1995	(United Kingdom) St. Andrew's Sporting Club, Glasgow, Scotland	
5	Win	5–0	(United Kingdom) Neil Parry	PTS	6	16 Jan 1995	(United Kingdom) Brunton Hall, Musselburgh, Scotland	
4	Win	4–0	(United Kingdom) Neil Parry	PTS	6	21 Nov 1994	(United Kingdom) St. Andrew's Sporting Club, Glasgow, Scotland	
3	Win	3–0	(United Kingdom) Tiger Singh	PTS	6	20 Sep 1994	(United Kingdom) Brunton Hall, Musselburgh, England	
2	Win	2–0	(United Kingdom) Terrace Gaskin	PTS	6	28 March 1994	(United Kingdom) Brunton Hall, Musselburgh, Scotland	
1	Win	1–0	(United Kingdom) Ian Bailie	KO	3 (6)	4 Mar 1994	(United Kingdom) Volunteer Rooms, Irvine, Scotland	
