= Kyung-Yung Lee =

South Korean boxer (born 1966)

Personal information
- Born: Kyung-Yung Lee; December 4, 1966 (age 59) Bonghwa, North Gyeongsang, South Korea
- Height: 5 ft 3 in (160 cm)
- Weight: Mini-flyweight

Boxing career
- Stance: Orthodox

Boxing record
- Total fights: 23
- Wins: 20
- Win by KO: 8
- Losses: 3

Kyung-Yung Lee (born December 4, 1966), is a South Korean former professional boxer who competed from 1985 to 1993. He is the first boxer to win a world title in the mini-flyweight division, capturing the inaugural International Boxing Federation (IBF) mini-flyweight title in 1987.

== Professional boxing record ==
23 fights	20 wins	3 losses
By knockout	8	2
By decision	12	1

No.	Result	Record	Opponent	Type	Round, time	Date	Location	Notes
23	Loss	20–3	Pichit Sithbanprachan	TKO	1 (12), 1:02	Jul 11, 1993	Provincial Stadium, Nakhon Sawan, Thailand	For IBF flyweight title
22	Loss	20–2	Ricardo López	UD	12	Dec 21, 1991	Incheon Gymnasium, Incheon, South Korea	For WBC mini-flyweight title
21	Win	20–1	Aswin Sithlakmuang	PTS	10	Aug 6, 1991	Munhwa Gymnasium, Seoul, South Korea	
20	Win	19–1	Vin Chuvanta	KO	1 (10), 0:34	Oct 20, 1990	Hanyang University Stadium, Seoul, South Korea	
19	Win	18–1	Chris Galon	UD	10	Jun 16, 1990	Jongha Gymnasium, Ulsan, South Korea	
18	Win	17–1	Nikki Maca	TD	8 (10), 1:25	Apr 15, 1990	Green Pier Hotel, Suwon, South Korea	
17	Win	16–1	Nikki Maca	PTS	10	Dec 29, 1989	Bucheon, South Korea	
16	Win	15–1	Hi-Hwan Moon	KO	4 (6), 3:00	Oct 3, 1989	Seoul, South Korea	
15	Win	14–1	Sang Sik Chang	KO	2 (10), 3:00	Oct 29, 1988	City Hall Square, Ansan, South Korea	
14	Win	13–1	Hi Chung Noh	UD	10	Jul 24, 1988	Pohang Gymnasium, Pohang, South Korea	
13	Win	12–1	Nico Thomas	KO	4 (10), 0:59	Apr 30, 1988	Ulsan Gymnasium, Ulsan, South Korea	
12	Loss	11–1	Hiroki Ioka	TKO	12 (12), 1:36	Jan 31, 1988	Osaka-Jo Hall, Osaka, Japan	For WBC mini-flyweight title
11	Win	11–0	Masaharu Kawakami	KO	2 (15), 0:31	Jun 14, 1987	Hawaii Hotel, Bugok, South Korea	Won inaugural IBF mini-flyweight title
10	Win	10–0	Byung Nam Park	KO	1 (10), 2:53	Mar 14, 1987	Chuncheon Gymnasium, Chuncheon, South Korea	
9	Win	9–0	Sung Kyu Kim	PTS	8	Nov 16, 1986	Girls' Commercial School, Gunsan, South Korea	
8	Win	8–0	Byung-Shik Bae	PTS	8	Aug 3, 1986	Munhwa Gymnasium, Seoul, South Korea	
7	Win	7–0	No Sung Choi	PTS	6	Jun 29, 1986	Munhwa Gymnasium, Seoul, South Korea	
6	Win	6–0	Il Hwan Kim	KO	5 (8), 2:30	May 31, 1986	Bucheon, South Korea	
5	Win	5–0	Dong Pil Yang	PTS	6	Jan 12, 1986	Munhwa Gymnasium, Seoul, South Korea	
4	Win	4–0	Hi Chung Noh	PTS	6	Dec 10, 1985	Munhwa Gymnasium, Seoul, South Korea	
3	Win	3–0	Jung Ho Kang	PTS	4	Dec 8, 1985	Munhwa Gymnasium, Seoul, South Korea	
2	Win	2–0	Jae Hak Chun	PTS	4	Dec 5, 1985	Munhwa Gymnasium, Seoul, South Korea	
1	Win	1–0	Young Jae Chung	KO	3 (4), 0:39	Dec 4, 1985	Munhwa Gymnasium, Seoul, South Korea	

== See also ==
- List of IBF world champions
- List of minimumweight boxing champions
- List of Korean boxers

Sporting positions
World boxing titles
Inaugural Champion	IBF mini-flyweight champion June 14 – December 1987; Vacated	Vacant Title next held by Samuth Sithnaruepol
Inaugural Champion	Lineal mini-flyweight champion June 14, 1987 – Jan 31, 1988	Succeeded by Hiroki Ioka
