= Manny Melchor =

Filipino boxer

Personal information
- Nickname: Cabalay
- Nationality: Filipino
- Born: Manuel Cabagay Melchor; March 14, 1969 (age 57) Mansalay, Philippines
- Height: 5 ft 3 in (160 cm)
- Weight: Mini flyweight

Boxing career
- Reach: 63 1/2 in (161 cm)
- Stance: Orthodox

Boxing record
- Total fights: 79
- Wins: 38
- Win by KO: 6
- Losses: 35
- Draws: 6

Manuel Cabagay Melchor (born March 14, 1969) is a Filipino former professional boxer who competed from 1987 to 2002. He held the IBF mini flyweight title in 1992.

== Professional career ==
Melchor turned professional in 1987 and compiled a record of 19–15–4 before facing and defeating Fahlan Sakkreerin, to win the IBF Mini flyweight title. He would lose the title in his first defense against Ratanapol Sor Vorapin. Melchor would get stopped by WBC champ & Mexican legend Ricardo López in his second attempt at a world title He would face another Mexican boxer José Antonio Aguirre, in his final attempt at a world title in 2001, he would lose via unanimous decision.

== Professional boxing record ==
79 fights	38 wins	35 losses
By knockout	6	10
By decision	32	25
Draws	6	

No.	Result	Record	Opponent	Type	Round, time	Date	Location	Notes
79	Loss	38–35–6	Gabriel Elizondo	TKO	7 (10)	2002-05-03	Randy's Ballroom, San Antonio, Texas, U.S.	
78	Loss	38–34–6	Beibis Mendoza	UD	8 (8)	2002-04-12	Miccosukee Resort & Gaming, Miami, Florida, U.S.	
77	Loss	38–33–6	Roberto Carlos Leyva	UD	10 (10)	2002-03-09	El Palenque, Aguascalientes, Mexico	
76	Loss	38–32–6	Fahlan Sakkreerin	TKO	5 (?)	2001-05-19	Bangkok, Thailand	
75	Loss	38–31–6	José Antonio Aguirre	UD	12 (12)	2001-02-02	Frontón Palacio Jai Alai, Tijuana, Mexico	
74	Loss	38–30–6	Zarlit Rodrigo	PTS	12 (12)	2000-10-14	Ynares Center, Antipolo City, Philippines	Lost WBC International Mini flyweight title
73	Win	38–29–6	Shinny Bayaar	PTS	12 (12)	2000-06-28	Araneta Coliseum, Quezon City, Philippines	Retained WBC International Mini flyweight title
72	Win	37–29–6	Ernesto Rubillar	UD	10 (10)	2000-04-08	Elorde Sports Center, Paranaque City, Philippines	
71	Win	36–29–6	Ernesto Rubillar	MD	12 (12)	1999-12-18	Elorde Sports Center, Paranaque City, Philippines	Won vacant WBC International Mini flyweight title
70	Win	35–29–6	Ronnie Canete	UD	10 (10)	1999-11-19	Mandaluyong City, Philippines	
69	Win	34–29–6	Ernesto Rubillar	TD	7 (10)	1999-07-27	Angeles City, Philippines	
68	Win	33–29–6	Jerry Pahayahay	UD	10 (10)	1999-05-28	Olympia Sports Complex, Makati City, Philippines	
67	Win	32–29–6	Rudy Idanio	UD	10 (10)	1999-03-12	Angeles City, Philippines	
66	Draw	31–29–6	Jose Clasida	SD	10 (10)	1998-07-18	Mandaluyong Gym, Mandaluyong City, Philippines	
65	Loss	31–29–5	Andy Tabanas	TD	7 (10)	1998-04-25	Cuneta Astrodome, Pasay City, Philippines	
64	Loss	31–28–5	Gilberto Gonzalez	TKO	6 (12)	1997-03-01	Japan	
63	Win	31–27–5	Masamori Tokuyama	PTS	10 (10)	1996-11-25	Korakuen Hall, Tokyo, Japan	
62	Loss	30–27–5	Panieng Poontarat	KO	3 (10)	1996-11-10	Provincial Stadium, Phichit, Thailand	
61	Loss	30–26–5	Kaaj Chartbandit	PTS	10 (10)	1996-09-21	Siam Jusco Shopping Center, Nonthaburi, Thailand	
60	Loss	30–25–5	Nolito Cabato	PTS	10 (10)	1996-08-13	Japan	
59	Win	30–24–5	Keisuke Ono	PTS	10 (10)	1996-06-23	Kashima, Japan	
58	Loss	29–24–5	Sin Sor Ploenjit	PTS	10 (10)	1996-03-24	Zeer Shopping Center, Rangsit, Thailand	
57	Win	29–23–5	Javier Varguez	UD	10 (10)	1995-10-09	Korakuen Hall, Tokyo, Japan	
56	Draw	28–23–5	Andy Tabanas	PTS	10 (10)	1995-09-16	Mandaluyong Gym, Mandaluyong City, Philippines	
55	Loss	28–23–4	Hyung Suk Kang	TKO	6 (?)	1995-08-04	Songtan Culture Hall, Pyeongtaek, South Korea	
54	Win	28–22–4	John Medina	PTS	10 (10)	1995-04-21	Cavite City, Philippines	
53	Win	27–22–4	Noknoi Sorthanikul	PTS	10 (10)	1994-12-30	Nepo Gym, Angeles City, Philippines	
52	Loss	26–22–4	Songkram Porpaoin	UD	10 (10)	1994-11-05	Chira Nakhon Stadium, Hat Yai, Thailand	
51	Loss	26–21–4	Osvaldo Guerrero	TKO	7 (12)	1994-08-12	Mexico City, Mexico	For vacant WBC International Mini flyweight title
50	Win	26–20–4	Roger Gamayot	PTS	10 (10)	1994-05-14	Araneta Coliseum, Quezon City, Philippines	
49	Loss	25–20–4	Ricardo López	KO	11 (12)	1993-12-18	Caesars Tahoe, Stateline, Nevada, U.S.	For WBC Mini flyweight title
48	Win	25–19–4	Jongjong Perez	KO	1 (?)	1993-10-29	Manila, Philippines	
47	Loss	24–19–4	SeokJin Yang	PTS	10 (10)	1993-09-18	Seoul, South Korea	
46	Win	24–18–4	Aswin Sithlakmuang	PTS	10 (10)	1993-07-17	Cuneta Astrodome, Pasay City, Philippines	
45	Win	23–18–4	Nilo Anosa	PTS	10 (10)	1993-06-19	Araneta Coliseum, Quezon City, Philippines	
44	Win	22–18–4	Rommel Lawas	PTS	10 (10)	1993-05-15	Bagabag, Philippines	
43	Loss	21–18–4	Toto Pongsawang	PTS	10 (10)	1993-04-09	Bangkok, Thailand	
42	Win	21–17–4	Jerry Pahayahay	UD	10 (10)	1993-03-20	Bongabong, Philippines	
41	Loss	20–17–4	Kim Kwang-sun	PTS	10 (10)	1993-02-14	Munhwa Gymnasium, Seoul, South Korea	
40	Loss	20–16–4	Ratanapol Sor Vorapin	SD	12 (12)	1992-12-10	National Stadium Gymnasium, Bangkok, Thailand	Lost IBF Mini flyweight title
39	Win	20–15–4	Fahlan Sakkreerin	SD	12 (12)	1992-09-06	Crocodile Farm, Samut Prakan, Thailand	Won IBF Mini flyweight title
38	Draw	19–15–4	Nolito Cabato	PTS	10 (10)	1992-03-20	Pasay City Sports Complex, Pasay City, Philippines	
37	Win	19–15–3	Pretty Boy Lucas	SD	10 (10)	1991-12-13	Rizal Memorial Coliseum, Manila, Philippines	
36	Win	18–15–3	Eric Chavez	UD	10 (10)	1991-09-21	Urdaneta City, Philippines	
35	Loss	17–15–3	Dodie Boy Peñalosa	TD	7 (?)	1991-04-25	Quezon City, Philippines	
34	Win	17–14–3	Warlito Franco	PTS	10 (10)	1991-03-03	Angeles City, Philippines	
33	Win	16–14–3	Eric Chavez	MD	10 (10)	1990-12-30	Pasay City Sports Complex, Pasay City, Philippines	
32	Loss	15–14–3	Kim Kwang-sun	PTS	8 (8)	1990-11-18	Munhwa Gymnasium, Seoul, South Korea	
31	Win	15–13–3	Peter Mitrevski	KO	5 (?)	1990-09-11	Bankstown, Australia	
30	Draw	14–13–3	Peter Mitrevski	PTS	10 (10)	1990-07-31	Enmore Theatre, Sydney, Australia	
29	Loss	14–13–2	Chana Porpaoin	PTS	10 (10)	1990-06-30	Municipality Gymnasium, Chiang Mai, Thailand	
28	Win	14–12–2	Eugene Flores	TD	4 (?)	1990-03-03	Swagman Hotel, Angeles City, Philippines	
27	Win	13–12–2	Angelo Escobar	TKO	7 (?)	1990-01-28	Angeles City, Philippines	
26	Win	12–12–2	Ric Magramo	PTS	10 (10)	1989-12-27	Manila, Philippines	
25	Win	11–12–2	Joel Revilla	KO	6 (?)	1989-11-30	Angeles City, Philippines	
24	Win	10–12–2	Anthony Rendiza	UD	10 (10)	1989-11-15	Elorde Sports Center, Paranaque City, Philippines	
23	Loss	9–12–2	Jaime Aliguin	MD	10 (10)	1989-10-21	Rizal Memorial Coliseum, Manila, Philippines	
22	Loss	9–11–2	Fred Tepait	UD	10 (10)	1989-08-29	Quezon City, Philippines	
21	Loss	9–10–2	Jon Penalosa	TKO	2 (?)	1989-08-19	Cebu Coliseum, Cebu City, Philippines	
20	Win	9–9–2	Boy Kid Emilia	PTS	10 (10)	1989-06-23	Philippines	
19	Loss	8–9–2	Puma Toguchi	TKO	7 (?)	1989-04-10	Japan	
18	Win	8–8–2	Fred Tepait	PTS	10 (10)	1989-01-30	Manila, Philippines	
17	Win	7–8–2	Diego Onglao	TKO	4 (?)	1989-01-14	Tarlac City, Philippines	
16	Win	6–8–2	Jun Tighinon	PTS	10 (10)	1988-12-29	Manila, Philippines	
15	Win	5–8–2	Sammy Tyson Pagadan	PTS	8 (8)	1988-12-03	Pasay City Sports Complex, Pasay City, Philippines	
14	Win	4–8–2	Joe Constantino	PTS	6 (6)	1988-10-24	Santa Ana Park, Makati City, Philippines	
13	Loss	3–8–2	Fred Tepait	PTS	6 (6)	1988-09-30	Rizal Memorial Coliseum, Manila, Philippines	
12	Win	3–7–2	Rex Villaverde	TKO	4 (?)	1988-09-16	San Juan, La Union, Philippines	
11	Loss	2–7–2	Eugene Flores	PTS	6 (6)	1988-08-28	Manila, Philippines	
10	Win	2–6–2	Obet Maamo	PTS	4 (4)	1988-08-17	Elorde Sports Center, Paranaque City, Philippines	
9	Loss	1–6–2	Fred Tepait	PTS	6 (6)	1988-07-30	Pasig City, Philippines	
8	Loss	1–5–2	Eugene Flores	UD	6 (6)	1988-07-13	Elorde Sports Center, Paranaque City, Philippines	
7	Loss	1–4–2	Eugene Flores	PTS	4 (4)	1988-06-08	Elorde Sports Center, Paranaque City, Philippines	
6	Draw	1–3–2	Eugene Flores	PTS	4 (4)	1988-05-08	Philippines	
5	Win	1–3–1	Obet Maamo	PTS	4 (4)	1988-04-20	Elorde Sports Center, Paranaque City, Philippines	
4	Draw	0–3–1	Nikki Maca	PTS	4 (4)	1987-12-19	Rizal Memorial Coliseum, Manila, Philippines	
3	Loss	0–3	Nikki Maca	PTS	4 (4)	1987-12-04	Del Monte Cockpit, Malabon City, Philippines	
2	Loss	0–2	Roger Opisina	PTS	4 (4)	1987-11-07	Monumento, Caloocan City, Philippines	
1	Loss	0–1	Roque Villanueva	TKO	3 (?)	1987-07-11	Filaus Gym, Manila, Philippines	

== Boxing trainer ==
Melchor retired in 2002 and went on to become a boxing trainer.

== See also ==
- List of world mini-flyweight boxing champions
- List of Filipino boxing world champions

Sporting positions
World boxing titles
Preceded by Fahlan Sakkreerin	IBF Mini flyweight champion September 6, 1992 – December 10, 1992	Succeeded by Ratanapol Sor Vorapin
