= Eric Chavez (boxer) =

Filipino boxer

Personal information
- Nickname: Kenta Sato
- Nationality: Filipino
- Born: Algerico Chavez Talisay, Cebu, Philippines
- Height: 5 ft 4 in (163 cm)
- Weight: Mini-flyweight

Boxing career
- Stance: Southpaw

Boxing record
- Total fights: 60
- Wins: 40
- Win by KO: 25
- Losses: 16
- Draws: 4

Algerico Chavez, better known as Eric Chavez, is a Filipino former professional boxer who competed from 1985 to 1998. He held the IBF mini-flyweight title from 1989 to 1990

== Professional career ==
Chavez turned professional in 1985 and compiled a record of 25–0–3 before facing and defeating Nico Thomas, to win the IBF Mini flyweight title. He would lose the title in his first defense against Fahlan Sakkreerin.

== Professional boxing record ==
60 fights	40 wins	16 losses
By knockout	25	2
By decision	15	14
Draws	4	

No.	Result	Record	Opponent	Type	Round, time	Date	Location	Notes
60	Loss	40–16–4	Mzukisi Marali	PTS	8 (8)	1998-10-03	Sisa Dukashe Stadium, East London, South Africa	
59	Loss	40–15–4	Ernesto Rubillar	UD	10 (10)	1998-08-19	Elorde Sports Center, Paranaque City, Philippines	
58	Win	40–14–4	Lolito Laroa	UD	10 (10)	1998-06-24	Elorde Sports Center, Paranaque City, Philippines	
57	Loss	39–14–4	Masibulele Makepula	UD	8 (8)	1998-05-16	Carousel Casino, Hammanskraal, South Africa	
56	Loss	39–13–4	Puma Toguchi	TKO	7 (10)	1997-07-21	Korakuen Hall, Tokyo, Japan	
55	Win	39–12–4	Jojo Idanio	TKO	6 (10)	1997-05-21	Elorde Sports Center, Paranaque City, Philippines	
54	Win	38–12–4	Ramil Gevero	UD	10 (10)	1997-02-19	Carmona, Philippines	
53	Loss	37–12–4	Rosendo Álvarez	MD	12 (12)	1996-06-15	City Gymnasium, Sendai, Japan	For WBA Mini flyweight title
52	Draw	37–11–4	Sung Tae Lim	PTS	8 (8)	1996-04-03	Pyeongtaek, South Korea	
51	Win	37–11–3	Kwanjai 3K Battery	TKO	1 (12)	1995-12-02	Provincial Gymnasium, Sa Kaeo, Thailand	Won PABA Mini flyweight title
50	Win	36–11–3	Ritichai Kiatprapas	KO	4 (10)	1995-11-15	Bangkok, Thailand	
49	Win	35–11–3	Noknoi Sorthanikul	KO	2 (10)	1995-04-15	Odate, Japan	
48	Win	34–11–3	Aswin Sithlakmuang	KO	3 (10)	1994-06-28	Japan	
47	Win	33–11–3	Jerry Pahayahay	UD	10 (10)	1994-04-09	Angeles City, Philippines	
46	Loss	32–11–3	Kaaj Chartbandit	UD	10 (10)	1994-03-05	Channel 7 Studios, Bangkok, Thailand	
45	Loss	32–10–3	Toto Pongsawang	SD	10 (10)	1993-12-21	Pathum Thani, Thailand	
44	Loss	32–9–3	Panieng Poontarat	MD	10 (10)	1993-09-15	Bangkok, Thailand	
43	Win	32–8–3	Takrawlek Dejrath	KO	2 (10)	1993-08-18	Channel 7 Studios, Bangkok, Thailand	
42	Win	31–8–3	Arnold Fernandez	TKO	1 (10)	1993-04-23	Davao City, Philippines	
41	Win	30–8–3	Fred Tepait	TD	6 (10)	1993-03-20	Kaun Laran Village, Caloocan City, Philippines	
40	Loss	29–8–3	Melvin Magramo	UD	10 (10)	1992-10-24	Araneta Coliseum, Quezon City, Philippines	
39	Win	29–7–3	Arnel Barotillo	MD	10 (10)	1992-09-08	Rizal Memorial Coliseum, Manila, Philippines	
38	Loss	28–7–3	Melvin Magramo	UD	10 (10)	1991-12-20	Balanga City, Philippines	
37	Loss	28–6–3	Noel Tunacao	UD	10 (10)	1991-11-30	Cebu City, Philippines	
36	Loss	28–5–3	Manny Melchor	UD	10 (10)	1991-09-21	Urdaneta City, Philippines	
35	Loss	28–4–3	Andy Tabanas	UD	10 (10)	1991-03-02	Cebu Coliseum, Cebu City, Philippines	
34	Loss	28–3–3	Manny Melchor	MD	10 (10)	1990-12-30	Pasay City Sports Complex, Pasay City, Philippines	
33	Win	28–2–3	Michael Ebo Danquah	KO	1 (10)	1990-12-01	San Juan Coliseum, San Juan City, Philippines	
32	Loss	27–2–3	Fahlan Sakkreerin	UD	12 (12)	1990-08-15	Rajadamnern Stadium, Bangkok, Thailand	For IBF Mini flyweight title
31	Win	27–1–3	Thaveelert Torboonlert	TKO	3 (10)	1990-05-18	Ninoy Aquino Stadium, Manila, Philippines	
30	Loss	26–1–3	Fahlan Sakkreerin	TKO	7 (12)	1990-02-22	Rajadamnern Stadium, Bangkok, Thailand	Lost IBF Mini flyweight title
29	Win	26–0–3	Nico Thomas	KO	5 (12)	1989-09-21	Lokasari Hall, Jakarta, Indonesia	Won IBF Mini flyweight title
28	Win	25–0–3	John Medina	TKO	5 (10)	1989-05-31	Pasay City Sports Complex, Pasay City, Philippines	
27	Win	24–0–3	Elson Duran	TKO	5 (10)	1988-12-16	Rizal Memorial Coliseum, Manila, Philippines	
26	Win	23–0–3	Romy Austria	TKO	3 (10)	1988-11-10	Rizal Memorial Coliseum, Manila, Philippines	
25	Win	22–0–3	Dommy Ursua Jr	TKO	1 (10)	1988-08-19	Infanta, Philippines	
24	Win	21–0–3	Mario Aliguin	UD	10 (10)	1987-12-12	ESC, Quezon City, Philippines	
23	Win	20–0–3	Romy Austria	UD	10 (10)	1987-10-24	Balanga City, Philippines	
22	Win	19–0–3	Edwin Inocencio	TKO	2 (10)	1987-08-30	Balanga City, Philippines	
21	Win	18–0–3	Mikio Uchida	KO	6 (10)	1987-04-28	Aichi Prefectural Gymnasium, Nagoya, Japan	
20	Win	17–0–3	Udin Baharudin	KO	5 (10)	1987-02-28	Bung Karno Stadium, Jakarta, Indonesia	
19	Win	16–0–3	Robert Palarit	TKO	6 (10)	1986-12-27	Elorde Sports Center, Paranaque City, Philippines	
18	Draw	15–0–3	Nick Dalisay	MD	10 (10)	1986-12-11	Rizal Memorial Coliseum, Manila, Philippines	
17	Win	15–0–2	Jun Altarejos	TKO	4 (10)	1986-10-29	Elorde Sports Center, Paranaque City, Philippines	
16	Win	14–0–2	Ric Santiago	TKO	7 (10)	1986-09-27	Cockpit Arena, Mandaluyong City, Philippines	
15	Win	13–0–2	Arsenio Perez	UD	10 (10)	1986-07-09	Olongapo City, Philippines	
14	Win	12–0–2	Romy Austria	UD	8 (8)	1986-06-12	San Fernando City, Philippines	
13	Win	11–0–2	Danny Duran	TKO	7 (8)	1986-05-30	Mandaluyong City, Philippines	
12	Win	10–0–2	Gil Lucaban	UD	8 (8)	1986-05-16	Pasay City Sports Complex, Pasay City, Philippines	
11	Win	9–0–2	Joel Revilla	TKO	4 (6)	1986-03-01	Eduardo's Super Club, Paranaque City, Philippines	
10	Win	8–0–2	Bernie Bernardo	UD	6 (6)	1986-02-22	Barangay Fort Bonifacio, Taguig City, Philippines	
9	Win	7–0–2	Darrell Tuazon	TKO	5 (6)	1986-01-16	Tuba, Philippines	
8	Win	6–0–2	Edgar Capino Jr	TKO	3 (6)	1985-12-30	Araneta Coliseum, Quezon City, Philippines	
7	Win	5–0–2	Leopoldo Bangsoyao	MD	4 (4)	1985-12-07	Barangay Abatan, Buguias, Philippines	
6	Draw	4–0–2	Baldoza Duran	TD	3 (6)	1985-11-09	Cebu City, Philippines	
5	Win	4–0–1	Danilo Staton	SD	4 (4)	1985-10-03	Lapu-Lapu City, Philippines	
4	Draw	3–0–1	Baldoza Duran	SD	4 (4)	1985-09-07	Mandaue City, Philippines	
3	Win	3–0	Danilo Staton	UD	4 (4)	1985-08-25	Borongan, Philippines	
2	Win	2–0	Luis Pelamor	TKO	3 (4)	1985-06-01	Cebu Coliseum, Cebu City, Philippines	
1	Win	1–0	Jun Gavero	SD	4 (4)	1985-05-08	Hindang, Philippines	

== See also ==
- List of world mini-flyweight boxing champions
- List of Filipino boxing world champions

Sporting positions
World boxing titles
Preceded by Nico Thomas	IBF Mini flyweight champion September 21, 1989 – February 22, 1990	Succeeded by Fahlan Sakkreerin
