= Samuth Sithnaruepol =

Thai boxer

Personal information
- Nationality: Thai
- Born: Watcharachai Sornprasert (วัชรชัย ศรประเสริฐ); 17 May 1959 (age 67) Dusit District (now Phaya Thai District), Bangkok, Thailand
- Height: 5 ft 3 in (160 cm)
- Weight: Mini flyweight

Boxing career
- Stance: Orthodox

Boxing record
- Total fights: 48
- Wins: 34
- Win by KO: 18
- Losses: 12
- Draws: 2
- No contests: 0

Samuth Sithnaruepol (Thai: สมุทร ศิษย์นฤพนธ์, born 17 May 1959) is a Thai retired professional boxer. He was the first Thai fighter to win the IBF world championship and weight class 105 lbs.

== Boxing career ==
After a Muay Thai career that saw him lose more fights than he won, Sithnaruepol turned to professional boxing in early 1982. Managed by Sr. Col. Banju Ongsangkune, he won the 105 lb. OPBF title and defended it four times.

On March 24, 1988, Sithnaruepol fought Filipino contender Pretty Boy Lucas for the vacant IBF mini flyweight title at Rajadamnern Stadium in Bangkok. In the 11th round, a facial injury left Lucas unable to continue, making Sithnaruepol the winner by TKO and Thailand's 11th world boxing champion.

Sithnaruepol defended two times before losing to Indonesian Nico Thomas on June 17, 1989 at Jakarta. Thomas became Indonesia's second world champion, after Ellyas Pical.

Despite being a champion, Sithnaruepol was not as well known as contemporaries like Khaosai Galaxy, Sot Chitalada, or Samart Payakaroon, perhaps because the IBF was a newly formed organization and not well known in Thailand.

After retirement, he entered military service as a Sergeant Major Second Class (SM2) at Department of Army Transportation.

Achievements
Vacant Title last held by Kyung-Yung Lee	IBF minimumweight champion March 24, 1988 - June 17, 1989	Succeeded by Nico Thomas
