= Mongkol Charoen =

Thai boxer (born 1978)

Personal information
- Nationality: Thai
- Born: Prasit Sripromtai; April 30, 1978 (age 48) Ban Phai, Khon Kaen, Thailand
- Height: 5 ft 2½ in (159 cm)
- Weight: Minimumweight; Junior flyweight

Boxing career
- Stance: Southpaw

Boxing record
- Total fights: 29
- Wins: 25
- Win by KO: 8
- Losses: 4
- Draws: 0
- No contests: 0

Mongkol Charoen (Thai: มงคล จ.เจริญ, born April 30, 1978, Khon Kaen) is a Thai former professional boxer who competed from 1994 to 2014. He held the minor organization WBF junior flyweight title in 1996.

== Career ==
Mongkol rose through the ranks alongside his stablemate, Wandee Charoen, also known as Wandee Singwangcha, who later captured the WBC minimumweight title in 1999 after Ricardo López relinquished the belt to campaign in a higher weight division.

In 1994, he captured the Rajadamnern Stadium mini flyweight title. In 1996, he won the WBF junior flyweight title and successfully defended it three times. In his first title defense, he won a unanimous decision over veteran Thai boxer Pornchai Sit Phraphrom after 12 rounds at Fashion Island, Bangkok in 1996.

On March 29, 1997, he challenged undefeated Mexican champion Ricardo López for the WBC minimumweight world championship at the Las Vegas Hilton in Las Vegas, Nevada, United States. The fight was featured on the undercard of a Don King promotion headlined by IBF heavyweight champion Michael Moorer, who defended his title against Vaughn Bean. It was Mongkol's first professional bout outside Thailand. He lost by unanimous decision after 12 rounds, with scorecards of 120–107, 119–108, and 120–107 in López's favor.

He fought his final professional bout in 2014.
