= Payak Nakornluang =

Thai boxer

Personal information
- Nationality: Thai
- Born: Kitichai Preecha; September 20, 1976 (age 49) Chandi, Chawang District, Nakhon Si Thammarat Province, Thailand
- Height: 160 cm (5 ft 3 in)
- Weight: strawweight

Boxing career
- Stance: orthodox

Boxing record
- Total fights: 19
- Wins: 14
- Win by KO: 3
- Losses: 5

Kitichai Preecha (Thai: กิตติชัย ปรีชา, born September 20, 1976), who boxes as Payak Nakornluang (พยัคฆ์ นครหลวงโปรโมชั่น), is a retired Thai professional boxer in strawweight division.

== Biography & Boxing career ==
He was born in the town of Chandi, Chawang District, Nakhon Si Thammarat Province, southern Thailand. He started boxing at the age of 12 starting with Muay Thai. Later, he changed manager and team along with changing to professional boxing seriously in name Sainam Chandiloha (สายน้ำ จันดีโลหะ) and won Lumpinee Boxing Stadium mini flyweight champion (comparable to Thailand champion).

He later changed his manager to a new man, Suchart Pisitwuttinan of Nakornluang Promotion and Vorapong Pukprajob (Monsawan Laemfapha) as a trainer. He made four more wins and given a chance to challenge WBC 105 pound world champion title with a Mexican holder Ricardo López in Fantasy Springs Casino, Indio, California on June 29, 1996, but he was knocked out with left uppercut in third round only.

He did not secure another match for the world championship. Although there were expectations that López might get into the junior flyweight division, but it didnt happen. He won a qualifying match against Thai boxer Chart Kiatpetch and eventually retiring from the sport.

== Professional boxing record ==
19 fights	14 wins	5 losses
By knockout	3	4
By decision	11	1

No.	Result	Record	Opponent	Type	Round, time	Date	Location	Notes
19	Win	14–5	Suriya Sameechang	PTS	8	20 Nov 1997	Bangkok, Thailand	
18	Win	13–5	Bernardo Jun Dabalos	UD	10	20 Aug 1997	Channel 7 Studios, Bangkok, Thailand	
17	Win	12–5	Rolando Teddy	TKO	5 (10)	18 Jun 1997	Channel 7 Studios, Bangkok, Thailand	
16	Win	11–5	Benjamin Escobia	PTS	8	30 May 1997	Phraram 9 Plaza, Bangkok, Thailand	
15	Win	10–5	Rodolfo Guilos	PTS	10	7 Apr 1997	New Worlde Shopping Center, Nonthaburi, Thailand	
14	Loss	9–5	Randy Mangubat	TD	7 (10)	19 Feb 1997	Channel 7 Studios, Bangkok, Thailand	
13	Win	9–4	Al Tarazona	PTS	10	5 Dec 1996	Nonthaburi Pier, Nonthaburi, Thailand	
12	Win	8–4	Roy Clave	KO	4 (10)	1 Sep 1996	New Worlde Shopping Center, Nonthaburi, Thailand	
11	Loss	7–4	Ricardo López	KO	3 (12), 1:46	29 Jun 1996	Fantasy Springs Resort Casino, Indio, California, U.S.	For WBC strawweight title
10	Win	7–3	Rodolfo Guilos	UD	10	21 Feb 1996	Bangkok, Thailand	
9	Loss	6–3	Allan Llanita	KO	7	20 Dec 1995	Bangkok, Thailand	
8	Win	6–2	Rolando Tadle	PTS	10	17 Sep 1995	Nonthaburi, Thailand	
7	Win	5–2	Joel Nice	PTS	10	19 Jul 1995	Thailand	
6	Win	4–2	Young Elmer	KO	4	17 Jul 1995	Bangkok, Thailand	
5	Loss	3–2	Edgar Maghanoy	TKO	4	9 Jun 1995	Bangkok, Thailand	
4	Loss	3–1	Anis Roga	TKO	9	1 Apr 1995	Amnat Charoen, Thailand	
3	Win	3–0	Fahuthai Suwanasil	PTS	10	7 Oct 1994	Lumpinee Boxing Stadium, Bangkok, Thailand	Won vacant Thai strawweight title
2	Win	2–0	Yuttachai Lookpinthong	PTS	6	15 Sep 1990	Lumpinee Boxing Stadium, Bangkok, Thailand	
1	Win	1–0	Sod Kiatmuangtanee	PTS	4	17 Aug 1990	Pattani, Thailand	
