= Eric Jamili =

Filipino boxer

Personal information
- Nationality: Filipino
- Born: Eric Jamili; May 20, 1977 (age 49) Silay, Negros Occidental, Philippines
- Height: 5 ft 6 in (1.68 m)
- Weight: Minimumweight; Light Flyweight

Boxing career
- Stance: Southpaw

Boxing record
- Total fights: 28
- Wins: 15
- Win by KO: 8
- Losses: 11
- Draws: 2

Eric Jamili (born May 20, 1977 in Silay, Negros Occidental, Philippines) is a retired Filipino professional boxer. He won the vacant WBO minimumweight title in December 1997 with an eighth round technical knockout of Englishman Mickey Cantwell in London. He lost the title in his first defense to Kermin Guardia six months later.

Eric is the younger brother of one-time world title challenger Reynante Jamili. Both trained out of the Elorde Boxing stable of Paranaque City, Philippines.

== Professional career ==
Jamili turned professional in 1995, beginning his career with a modest record of 5-5-1. Jamili then won the next five of his bouts, capturing the WBO Inter-Continental minimumweight title and earning a shot at the WBO minimumweight title against Englishman Mickey Cantwell that had been vacated by Ricardo López (boxer).

Jamili traveled to London in December 1997 to face Cantwell, and managed to cut him in the first round. Jamili's longer reach and tricky southpaw style befuddled Cantwell, who was hampered by the cut. Referee Mark Nelson halted the bout at 1:22 of the eighth round due to the cut, awarding the championship to Jamili.

Jamili lost the title in May 1998 with a fifth round technical knockout loss to Kermin Guardia. Jamili, who had arrived in the fight location of Las Vegas, Nev. just two days prior to the bout, was knocked down prior to the end of the fourth round. In a rematch in March 1999, Jamili knocked Guardia down in rounds 4 and 9, but lost a unanimous decision.

Jamili received a shot at the IBF minimumweight title against Zolani Petelo in May 1999. Jamili was knocked out with a left hook to the body at 1:21 of the first round.

Jamili would fight just six more times afterwards, going 2-3-1 with all three losses by knockout before retiring in 2003.

== Professional boxing record ==
28 fights	15 wins	11 losses
By knockout	8	7
By decision	7	4
Draws	2	

No.	Result	Record	Opponent	Type	Round, time	Date	Location	Notes
28	Loss	15–11–2	(Mexico) Hugo Cázares	TKO	3 (12)	Jan 18, 2003	Estadio Emilio Ibarra Almada, Los Mochis, Mexico	For WBO–NABO light flyweight title
27	Win	15–10–2	(Philippines) Danny Linasa	UD	6	Dec 19, 2002	Imus, Philippines	
26	Loss	14–10–2	(Indonesia) Anis Ceunfin	KO	6 (10)	May 18, 2002	Oepoi Stadium, Kupang, Indonesia	
25	Loss	14–9–2	(Philippines) Alfred Nagal	KO	5 (8), 1:44	Feb 17, 2002	Elorde Sports Center, Parañaque, Philippines	
24	Win	14–8–2	(Guam) George Arcenal	KO	2 (10)	Jun 4, 2000	Agana, Guam	
23	Draw	13–8–2	(Philippines) Ray Ganton	TD	3 (10)	May 6, 2000	Elorde Sports Center, Parañaque, Philippines	
22	Loss	13–8–1	(South Africa) Zolani Petelo	KO	1 (12), 1:21	May 29, 1999	Carousel Casino, Hammanskraal, South Africa	For IBF minimumweight title
21	Loss	13–7–1	(Colombia) Kermin Guardia	UD	12	Mar 27, 1999	(United States) Jai Alai Fronton, Miami, Florida, U.S.	For WBO minimumweight title
20	Win	13–6–1	(Philippines) Mateo Baring	KO	2 (10)	Dec 23, 1998	Elorde Sports Center, Parañaque, Philippines	Retained WBO Inter-Continental minimumweight title
19	Win	12–6–1	(Indonesia) Falazona Fidal	PTS	12	Sep 12, 1998	KSC, Silay, Philippines	Won vacant WBO Inter-Continental light flyweight title
18	Loss	11–6–1	(Colombia) Kermin Guardia	RTD	5 (12), 3:00	May 30, 1998	(United States) Las Vegas Hilton, Las Vegas, Nevada, U.S.	Lost WBO minimumweight title
17	Win	11–5–1	(United Kingdom) Mickey Cantwell	TKO	8 (12), 1:22	Dec 19, 1997	(United Kingdom) London Arena, London, England	Won vacant WBO minimumweight title
16	Win	10–5–1	(Philippines) Lolito Laroa	TD	4 (8)	Aug 27, 1997	Elorde Sports Center, Parañaque, Philippines	
15	Win	9–5–1	(Thailand) Inthanon Petchbanden	TKO	1 (12)	Apr 30, 1997	Parañaque, Philippines	Won vacant WBO Inter-Continental minimumweight title
14	Win	8–5–1	(Philippines) Flash Villacura	UD	6	Mar 15, 1997	Almendras Gym, Davao City, Philippines	
13	Win	7–5–1	(Philippines) Manuel Silvano	TKO	6 (8)	Jan 15, 1997	Elorde Sports Center, Parañaque, Philippines	
12	Win	6–5–1	(Philippines) Randy Villamor	TKO	4 (8)	Dec 4, 1996	Elorde Sports Center, Parañaque, Philippines	
11	Loss	5–5–1	(Philippines) Manuel Silvano	KO	5 (8)	Aug 17, 1996	Subic Sports Complex, Olongapo, Philippines	
10	Loss	5–4–1	(Philippines) Melchor Espinosa	MD	6	Jul 6, 1996	Rizal Park, Manila, Philippines	
9	Win	5–3–1	(Philippines) Rodel Cabahug	TKO	2 (6)	Apr 10, 1996	Elorde Sports Center, Parañaque, Philippines	
8	Win	4–3–1	(Philippines) Leopoldo Ibanez	UD	4	Feb 24, 1996	Parañaque, Philippines	
7	Loss	3–3–1	(Philippines) Vicente Adrales	TKO	4 (8)	Dec 16, 1995	Bacolod, Philippines	
6	Win	3–2–1	(Philippines) Leopoldo Ibanez	UD	6	Oct 28, 1995	Parañaque, Philippines	
5	Win	2–2–1	(Philippines) Romeo Tura	KO	1 (6)	Aug 5, 1995	Bacolod, Philippines	
4	Loss	1–2–1	(Philippines) Jose Clasida	SD	6	May 27, 1995	Ninoy Aquino Stadium, Manila, Philippines	
3	Loss	1–1–1	(Philippines) Leopoldo Ibanez	SD	4	Apr 8, 1995	Elorde Sports Center, Parañaque, Philippines	
2	Win	1–0–1	(Philippines) Jose Clasida	MD	4	Mar 17, 1995	Angeles City, Philippines	
1	Draw	0–0–1	(Philippines) Sandy Bercasio	SD	4	Feb 11, 1995	Makati, Philippines	

Achievements
Vacant Title last held by Ricardo López	WBO minimumweight champion December 19, 1997 - May 30, 1998	Succeeded by Kermin Guardia
