= Alonso López (boxer) =

Mexican boxer (born 1986)

Personal information
- Nickname: Finito
- Born: Alonso López; 28 May 1986 (age 40) Mexico City, Mexico
- Height: 5 ft 2 in (157 cm)
- Weight: Super Flyweight; Flyweight

Boxing career
- Reach: 68 in (174 cm)
- Stance: Orthodox

Boxing record
- Total fights: 16
- Wins: 13
- Win by KO: 5
- Draws: 3

Alonso López (born 28 May 1986) is a Mexican former professional boxer. Born in Mexico City, he is the son of former world boxing champion Ricardo López.

== Professional career ==
On 29 November 2008 López won his pro debut against Rafael Colin by knockout in Ciudad Acuña, Coahuila, Mexico.

== Professional boxing record ==
16 fights	13 wins	0 losses
By knockout	5	0
By decision	8	0
Draws	3	

No.	Result	Record	Opponent	Type	Round, time	Date	Location	Notes
16	Draw	13–0–3	Victor Manuel Agudo	SD	5	9 March 2013	University of Guadalajara Gimnasio Usos Múltiples, Guadalajara, Jalisco, Mexico	
15	Draw	13–0–2	Marvin Noe Diaz Canales	UD	4	11 August 2012	Complejo Panamericano, Guadalajara, Jalisco, Mexico	
14	Win	13–0–1	Ivan Galicia Morelos	KO	3 (4), 2:14	25 February 2012	Centro de Convenciones Siglo XXI, Mérida, Yucatán, Mexico	
13	Win	13–0	Reyes Lopez Escalante	UD	4	29 October 2011	Centro de Usos Multiples, Hermosillo, Sonora, Mexico	
12	Win	11–0–1	Leroy Zavala	KO	1 (6), 2:24	20 August 2011	La Cetto Vineyard, Valle de Guadalupe, Baja California, Mexico	
11	Win	10–0–1	Wilberth Lopez	UD	4	16 July 2011	Plaza de Toros, Cancún, Quintana Roo, Mexico	
10	Win	9–0–1	Jorge Guerrero Aguilar	UD	6	2 April 2011	Auditorio del Estado, Mexicali, Baja California, Mexico	
9	Draw	8–0–1	Herald Molina	MD	4	25 November 2010	Casino Pharaohs, Managua, Nicaragua	
8	Win	8–0	Javier Marquez Clemente	UD	4	2 October 2010	Polyforum Zam Ná, Mérida, Yucatán, Mexico	
7	Win	7–0	German Aaron Cota	UD	4	18 September 2010	Estadio Banorte, Culiacán, Sinaloa, Mexico	
6	Win	6–0	Juan Pedro Rodriguez	UD	4	31 July 2010	Palenque de la Feria, Tepic, Nayarit, Mexico	
5	Win	5–0	Jorge Ramirez	KO	3 (6), 2:30	19 June 2010	Plaza de Toros, San Juan del Rio, Querétaro, Mexico	
4	Win	4–0	Luis Misael Juarez	UD	4	24 April 2010	Centro de Usos Multiples, Ciudad Obregón, Sonora, Mexico	
3	Win	3–0	Sergio Cruz Gregorio	TKO	3 (4), 2:02	30 January 2010	Restaurante Arroyo, Mexico City, Mexico	
2	Win	2–0	Rodrigo Garcia Ocampo	UD	4	21 November 2009	Recinto Ferial de Xmatkuil, Mérida, Yucatán, Mexico	
1	Win	1–0	Rafael Colin	TKO	4 (4), 2:00	29 November 2008	Gimnasio Municipal José López Portillo, Ciudad Acuna, Coahuila, Mexico	

== See also ==
- Notable boxing families
