= Fahlan Sakkreerin =

Thai boxer

Personal information
- Nationality: Thai
- Born: Thongchai Uthaida (ธงชัย อุทัยดา); 10 April 1968 (age 58) Tambon Nong Pling, Amphoe Mueang Maha Sarakham, Maha Sarakham province, Thailand
- Height: 5 ft 3 in (160 cm)
- Weight: Mini flyweight, Light flyweight, Flyweight

Boxing career
- Stance: Southpaw

Boxing record
- Total fights: 58
- Wins: 54
- Win by KO: 23
- Losses: 4
- Draws: 0
- No contests: 0

Fahlan Sakkreerin or Fahlan Lukmingkwan (Thai: ฟ้าลั่น ศักดิ์กรีรินทร์, ฟ้าลั่น ลูกมิ่งขวัญ, born 10 April 1968) is a retired Thai professional boxer who takes IBF mini flyweight and WBF flyweight world championships in 1990s.

== Boxing career ==
Fahlan made his debut by defeating the future two-time WBA minimumweight title holder Chana Porpaoin in June 1988. He boxed under "Lukmingkwan Boxing Gym" (ค่ายมวยลูกมิ่งขวัญ), located at Mingkwan Alley in downtown Nonthaburi, where he used the name "Fahlan Lukmingkwan," with Manoch Buabut serving as both his trainer and manager.

He achieved 13 consecutive wins, including capturing the Rajadamnern Stadium mini flyweight championship. With sponsorship from Sr. Col. Banju Ongsangkune, he was given the opportunity to challenge for the IBF world title in the same weight class against Filipino holder Eric Chavez on February 22, 1990, at Rajadamnern Stadium. Fahlan won the bout by TKO in the seventh round after Chávez sustained a cut above his eyebrow and could not continue. However, the fight drew criticism due to an alleged headbutt.

He successfully defended his title seven times throughout Thailand. Later, a conflict of interest arose between Manoch Buabut and Banju Ongsangkune, who had become Fahlan's co-manager. This led to Fahlan losing his title in his eighth defense against Manny Melchor at Samutprakarn Crocodile Farm and Zoo in 1992, in what was seen as a deliberate shift to make room for a new world title challenger, who would later become Ratanapol Sor Vorapin.

Fahlan continued fighting for two more years before switching to a new team and manager, Ekarat "Jimmy" Chaichotchuang of Kiat Kreerin Promotion, with Pol. Lt. Col. Kreerin Inkaew as his sponsor. He adopted a new ring name "Fahlan Sakkreerin."

He then moved up to the flyweight division and challenged WBF world champion Krasimir Cholakov of Bulgaria at the Southern Association of Thailand, located in suburban Bangkok, on October 22, 1994. Fahlan won the bout by unanimous decision.

He defended his WBF title eight times before being stripped of it in November 2000. Later, he also won the IBF Pan Pacific light flyweight title, which he successfully defended five times between 2002 and 2007. He also had four opportunities to challenge for world titles under major sanctioning bodies such as the WBO and IBF in the minimumweight and light flyweight divisions, but was unsuccessful in each attempt. All of these bouts took place abroad.

== Boxing style ==
His boxing style is aggressive and relentless. Fahlan Sakkreerin Jr., or Teeraphong Utaida, is his son, who follows in his footsteps as a professional boxer.

== See also ==
- List of minimumweight boxing champions
- List of IBF world champions

Achievements
Preceded by Eric Chavez	IBF minimumweight champion February 22, 1990 - September 6, 1992	Succeeded by Manny Melchor
