= Yanqui Díaz =

Cuban boxer (born 1976)

Yamplier ("Yanqui") Azcuy Díaz (born January 23, 1976, in Pinar del Río) is a former professional heavyweight boxer from Cuba.

== Amateur career ==
Diaz started boxing at the age of twelve and had 205 amateur fights (191-14). He fought as an amateur for eleven years and was a member of the Cuban national team until he was 25. Diaz fought the Félix Savón twice, and he reportedly scored two knockdowns in the fights, but Savon won both by decision.

== Professional career ==
On August 13, 2004, Diaz upset highly regarded and undefeated Cuban heavyweight prospect and former cruiserweight champion Juan Carlos Gomez with a vicious 1-round TKO. Still in 2004 he scored a victory over former title challenger Vaughn Bean.

However, his ascension was derailed on January 22, 2005, via a 5-round TKO loss to Nigerian power puncher Samuel Peter. He did not manage to score a win ever since, losing four out of his last six fights with two no contests. His last bout was in 2006 December when he was knocked out by former world champion Oliver McCall.

His current professional record stands at 13 wins (8 KOs) 5 losses and 2 no contests in 20 bouts.

== Professional boxing record ==
13 Wins (8 knockouts, 5 decisions), 5 Losses (2 knockouts, 3 decisions), 2 No Contests
Result	Record	Opponent	Type	Round	Date	Location	Notes
Loss	48-8	(United States) Oliver "Atomic Bull" McCall	KO	7	09/12/2006	Hollywood, Florida, United States	Diaz knocked out at 2:28 of the seventh round.
Loss	19-0-1	(United States) Damian Wills	UD	8	08/06/2006	Hollywood, California, United States	71-79, 72-78, 73-77.
No Contest	5-0	(United States) Jason Estrada	NC	1	13/02/2006	Providence, Rhode Island, United States	
No Contest	11-4-1	(United States) Derek Berry	NC	1	12/11/2005	Las Vegas, Nevada, United States	
Loss	35-2-1	(Canada) Kirk Johnson	TD	5	09/06/2005	Temecula, California, United States	42-49, 42-49, 43-49.
Loss	21-0	(Nigeria) Samuel Peter	TKO	5	22 Jan 2005	Miami, Florida, United States	USBA Heavyweight Title. Diaz knocked out at 0:54 of the fifth round.
Win	44-4	(United States) Vaughn Bean	SD	10	12/11/2004	Green Bay, Wisconsin, United States	97-94, 97-94, 94-98.
Win	25-14-1	(United States) Marcellus Brown	TKO	1	17/09/2004	Las Vegas, Nevada, United States	Referee stopped the bout at 2:16 of the first round.
Win	37-0	(Cuba) Juan Carlos Gomez	TKO	1	13/08/2004	Laredo, Texas, United States	Referee stopped the bout at 1:46 of the first round.
Win	17-12-2	(Tonga) Sione Asipeli	UD	6	19/06/2004	Reno, Nevada, United States	60-52, 60-52, 60-52.
Win	21-3	(Cuba) Aurelio Perez	UD	8	01/05/2004	Miami, Florida, United States	80-72, 80-72, 80-72.
Loss	21-1	(United States) Tony Thompson	UD	8	27/03/2004	Stateline, Nevada, United States	72-78, 73-77, 71-79.
Win	12-0-1	(United States) Michael Simms	MD	6	21/02/2004	Reno, Nevada, United States	58-55, 57-55, 56-56.
Win	0-2	(United States) Jason Stinson	TKO	1	11/12/2003	Lemoore, California, United States	Referee stopped the bout at 2:40 of the first round.
Win	4-0	(United States) Roy Meador	TKO	3	05/12/2003	Los Angeles, California, United States	Referee stopped the bout at 1:17 of the third round.
Win	--	(United States) Germain Thedford	UD	4	13/11/2003	Las Vegas, Nevada, United States	40-35, 40-35, 40-35.
Win	7-1	(Ukraine) Andriy Oliynyk	TKO	2	01/11/2003	Las Vegas, Nevada, United States	Referee stopped the bout at 2:59 of the second round.
Win	1-3-2	(United States) Salvador Farnetti	KO	2	14/06/2003	Las Vegas, Nevada, United States	Farnetti knocked out at 0:26 of the second round.
Win	1-24-1	(Mexico) Juan Ramon Perez	TKO	2	28/03/2003	Ciudad Juarez, Chihuahua, Mexico	Referee stopped the bout at 2:23 of the second round.
Win	1-23-1	(Mexico) Juan Ramon Perez	TKO	5	01/11/2002	Ciudad Juarez, Chihuahua, Mexico	
