= Darren Fifield =

English boxer

Daren Fifield
Personal information
- Nationality: English
- Born: 9 October 1969 (age 56) Wantage, England
- Height: 5 ft 2 in (157 cm)
- Weight: light fly/fly/super fly/bantamweight

Boxing career

Boxing record
- Total fights: 13
- Wins: 7 (KO 5)
- Losses: 4 (KO 2)
- Draws: 2

Daren Fifield (born 9 October 1969 in Wantage) is an English amateur light flyweight and professional fly/super fly/bantamweight boxer of the 1990s, who as an amateur won the 1992 Amateur Boxing Association of England (ABAE) light flyweight title, against Lee Woodcock (Royal Navy), boxing out of Henley ABC, and as a professional won the Commonwealth flyweight title, and was a challenger for the British Boxing Board of Control (BBBofC) Southern Area flyweight title against Mickey Cantwell, and Ricky Beard, European Boxing Union (EBU) flyweight title against Luigi Camputaro, and BBBofC British flyweight title against Francis Ampofo, his professional fighting weight varied from flyweight to bantamweight.
