= Ratanapol Sor Vorapin =

Thai boxer

Ratanapol Sor Vorapin รัตนพล ส.วรพิน
Personal information
- Nicknames: Khaosai Noi (เขาทรายน้อย) "Little Khaosai"; Ai-Bo (ไอ้โบ้) "Rambo"
- Nationality: Thai
- Born: Preecha Charoenthara; Anucha Phothong (formerly); June 6, 1974 (age 52) Dan Khun Thot, Nakhon Ratchasima, Thailand
- Height: 1.62 m (5 ft 4 in)
- Weight: Mini flyweight Junior flyweight Flyweight

Boxing career
- Stance: Southpaw

Boxing record
- Total fights: 68
- Wins: 59
- Win by KO: 48
- Losses: 8
- Draws: 1

Ratanapol Sor Vorapin (Thai: รัตนพล ส.วรพิน; born Preecha Charoenthara (Thai: ปรีชา เจริญธารา), formerly Anucha Phothong (อนุชา โพธิ์ทอง)) is a Thai former professional boxer. He is the older brother of former World Boxing Organization Bantamweight champion Ratanachai Sor Vorapin.

== Early life ==
Vorapin was born on June 6, 1974, to Somjai and Somjit Phothong in Dan Khun Thot, Nakhon Ratchasima province. Despite having large amounts of land, Vorapin, his parents, and his 14 siblings were impoverished farmers, as the mountainous ground was poor soil for agriculture. Because of his poverty, he became a boxer at age fourteen in Muaythai using the names "Tonaonoy Toichainee" (ทนเอาหน่อย ต่อยใช้หนี้) and "Lion Luknamjai" (ไลอ้อน ลูกน้ำใจ) sponsored by Yindee Juntacup, a local celebrity.

== Professional career ==
Vorapin traveled to Bangkok to fight Muaythai under Sor Vorapin Boxing Gym. The name "Ratanapol" is actually the name of another fighter. Going pro in 1990, Ratanapol fought in the place of Chana Porpaoin, out because of his injured nose, and defeated his opponent. Because of that victory, he received serious support.

When Fahlan Lukmingkwan lost the IBF Mini flyweight championship to Filipino Manny Melchor in mid-1992, Ratanapol was encouraged by Sr. Col. Banju Ongsangkune and Suchart "Pe Poster" Kerdmek to return to Thailand. On December 10, 1992, at Nimibutr Stadium, he scored a 12-round split decision victory over Manny Melchor to win the Mini flyweight title. He would defend that title against twelve boxers, but he lost the title on the scales on March 15, 1996, because he could not make his weight 105 pounds to qualify. On May 18 the same year, however, he returned as the world champion and he retained it six times until December 27, 1997, when he received a 5th-round TKO loss to South African Zolani Petelo at Songkhla province, southern Thailand.

He had two unsuccessful attempts at the IBF Junior flyweight title, first dropping a unanimous decision to Will Grigsby on December 18, 1998. And then on December 2, 2000, he received a 3rd-round TKO loss to Mexican Ricardo "El Finito" López in Las Vegas. Near the end of the career, he changed his manager to Kokiet "Sia Ko" Panichyarom of Kokiet Boxing Group and promoted to Flyweight and won the PABA title.

== Boxing style ==
Ratanapol had a heavy left punch and a long reach but little footwork or agility. His right hand was used mainly to judge distance for his left, similar to the famed Khaosai Galaxy, even receiving the nickname "Little Khaosai" from Thai boxing fans.

In addition every time before the bout, he shouted "Chaiyo...Chaiyo...Ya Mo Ok Suek!!" (ไชโย...ไชโย...ย่าโมออกศึก!!; lit: "Cheer...Cheer...Grandma Mo to Battle!!") to create a frenzy.

== Retirement ==
After retirement, Ratanapol's life was very difficult. Burdened by debt, he sold street vendor noodles in Bang Lamphu neighborhood near Sor Vorapin Boxing Gym with his wife, and sold DVDs of his own biography on the Bangkok streets. At the most stressful moments, he attempted suicide by hanging with an electric wire He also received ordination at Wat Phra Dhammakaya.

== Politics ==
In politically Ratnapol alliance with the United Front for Democracy Against Dictatorship (UDD) or Red Shirts, and joined the protesters on several occasions such as 2005–06 Thai political crisis, or 2013–14 Thai political crisis etc.

== Professional boxing record ==
68 fights	59 wins	8 losses
By knockout	48	5
By decision	11	3
Draws	1	

No.	Result	Record	Opponent	Type	Round, time	Date	Location	Notes
68	Loss	59–8–1	Rey Migreno	KO	5(11)	Jul 10, 2009	Phuket, Thailand	Lost PABA Flyweight Title
67	Win	59–7–1	Wido Paez	KO	3(11)	May 7, 2009	Phattalung, Thailand	Won PABA Flyweight Title
66	Win	58–7–1	Noriyuki Komatsu	TKO	1(10)	Feb 08, 2009	(Thailand) IMP Hall, Osaka, Japan	
65	Win	57–7–1	Wanlop Sawangwong	KO	3(6)	Nov 26, 2008	Mukdahan, Thailand	
64	Loss	56–7–1	Richard Garcia	MD	11	Oct 03, 2008	Nakhon Ratchasima, Thailand	Lost PABA Flyweight Title
63	Win	56–6–1	Fang Shuai	KO	1(11)	Jul 16, 2008	Phattalung, Thailand	Retained PABA Flyweight Title
62	Win	55–6–1	Juharum Silaban	KO	3(11)	May 23, 2008	Kalasin, Thailand	Retained PABA Flyweight Title
61	Win	54–6–1	Sam Burdam	KO	2(11)	Apr 15, 2008	Nakhon Phanom, Thailand	Retained PABA Flyweight Title
60	Win	53–6–1	Pingping Tepura	TKO	2(11)	Feb 14, 2008	Minburi, Thailand	Retained PABA Flyweight Title
59	Win	52–6–1	Alwi Alhabsyi	KO	1(12)	Nov 16, 2007	Surat Thani, Thailand	Won vacant PABA Flyweight Title
58	Win	51–6–1	Yanus Emaury	KO	3(6)	Oct 03, 2007	Nakhon Ratchasima, Thailand	
57	Win	50–6–1	Gui Yao Bo	KO	3(8)	Jul 24, 2007	Mahasarakam, Thailand	
56	Win	49–6–1	Takayuki Okumoto	TKO	2(6)	May 29, 2007	Kalasin, Thailand	
55	Win	48–6–1	Edwin Ezekiel	KO	1(6)	Mar 29, 2007	Phichit, Thailand	
54	Win	47–6–1	Hendrik Barongsay	KO	3(6)	Jan 31, 2007	Nonthaburi, Thailand	
53	Win	46–6–1	Christian Collado	UD	6	Oct 04, 2006	Nakhon Ratchasima, Thailand	
52	Win	45–6–1	Edo Resilay	KO	1(8)	Aug 16, 2006	Prachuap Khiri Khan, Thailand	
51	Win	44–6–1	Masatsugu Okada	PTS	6	May 10, 2006	Yasothon, Thailand	
50	Win	43–6–1	Ratazu Matsui	KO	2(6)	Feb 22, 2006	Mae Hong Son, Thailand	
49	Win	42–6–1	Alex Buckie	TKO	4(6)	Nov 21, 2005	Bangkok, Thailand	
48	Win	41–6–1	Dicky Timor	KO	1(6)	Oct 04, 2005	Nakhon Ratchasima, Thailand	
47	Win	40–6–1	Arbon Beyer	KO	3(6)	Sep 02, 2005	Nonthaburi, Thailand	
46	Win	39–6–1	Alex Buckie	UD	12	Aug 05, 2005	Patong Beach, Patong, Thailand	
45	Loss	38–6–1	Ricardo López	TKO	3 (12), 2:11	Dec 2, 2000	(United States) Mandalay Bay Resort & Casino, Las Vegas, U.S.A	For IBF Light Flyweight Title
44	Loss	38–5–1	Yura Dima	KO	2 (12)	Nov 05, 1999	Nakhon Sawan, Thailand	
43	Win	38–4–1	Jerry Rosales	KO	4 (?)	Sep 03, 1999	Mukdahan Grand Hotel Arena, Mukdahan, Thailand	
42	Loss	37–4–1	Will Grigsby	UD	12	Dec 18, 1998	(United States) Memorial Auditorium, Fort Lauderdale, U.S.A	For vacant IBF Light Flyweight Title
41	Win	37–3–1	Alpong Navaja	PTS	10	Sep 20, 1998	Samut Prakan, Thailand	
40	Win	36–3–1	Leo Ramirez	TKO	2 (10)	Aug 12, 1998	Ratchadaphisek, Thailand	
39	Win	35–3–1	Jerry Pahayahay	TKO	4 (10)	Jun 05, 1998	Bangkok, Thailand	
38	Loss	34–3–1	Zolani Petelo	TKO	4 (12), 2:00	Dec 27, 1997	Provincial Military Stadium, Songkhla, Thailand	Lost IBF Minimumweight Title
37	Win	34–2–1	Wellington Vicente	TKO	2 (12)	Aug 30, 1997	Indoor Provincial Stadium, Nong Khai, Thailand	Retained IBF Minimumweight Title
36	Win	33–2–1	Juan Herrera	UD	12	Jun 14, 1997	Ban Rai School, Nakhon Ratchasima, Thailand	Retained IBF Minimumweight Title
35	Win	32–2–1	Luis Doria	TKO	4 (12)	Mar 22, 1997	Provincial Stadium, Sara Buri, Thailand	Retained IBF Minimumweight Title
34	Win	31–2–1	Eddie Felisilda	KO	5 (10)	Jan 18, 1997	Provincial Stadium, Udon Thani, Thailand	
33	Win	30–2–1	Gustavo Vera	KO	2 (12)	Nov 24, 1996	Provincial Stadium, Udon Thani, Thailand	Retained IBF Minimumweight Title
32	Win	29–2–1	Oscar Andrade	KO	5 (12)	Sep 28, 1996	Provincial Stadium, Prachuap Khiri Khan, Thailand	Retained IBF Minimumweight Title
31	Win	28–2–1	Jun Orhaliza	KO	3 (12)	Jul 13, 1996	Provincial Stadium, Yala, Thailand	Retained IBF Minimumweight Title
30	Win	27–2–1	Jun Arlos	UD	12	May 18, 1996	Provincial Stadium, Yala, Thailand	Won vacant IBF Minimumweight Title
29	Win	26–2–1	Lee Sandoval	TKO	11 (12)	Mar 16, 1996	Si Sa Ket, Thailand	For vacant IBF Minimumweight Title; Title on stake for Sandoval only as Ratanapol failed to make weight
28	Win	25–2–1	Osvaldo Guerrero	TKO	6 (12)	Dec 30, 1995	Chakkam Khanathon School, Lumphun, Thailand	Retained IBF Minimumweight Title
27	Win	24–2–1	Jack Russell	KO	2 (12)	Oct 29, 1995	Provincial Stadium, Suphan Buri, Thailand	Retained IBF Minimumweight Title
26	Win	23–2–1	Dario Olarte	TKO	2 (?)	Aug 20, 1995	Bangkok, Thailand	
25	Win	22–2–1	Oscar Alfonso Flores	TKO	2 (12)	May 20, 1995	Municipal Soccer Stadium, Chiang Mai, Thailand	Retained IBF Minimumweight Title
24	Win	21–2–1	Jerry Pahayahay	TKO	3 (12)	Feb 25, 1995	Zeer Shopping Center, Rangsit, Thailand	Retained IBF Minimumweight Title
23	Win	20–2–1	Carlos Alberto Rodriguez	TKO	3 (12)	Nov 12, 1994	University Stadium, Khon Kaen, Thailand	Retained IBF Minimumweight Title
22	Win	19–2–1	Marcelino Bolivar	TKO	4 (12)	Aug 20, 1994	Buriram, Thailand	Retained IBF Minimumweight Title
21	Win	18–2–1	Roger Espanola	TKO	6 (12)	May 14, 1994	Sara Buri, Thailand	Retained IBF Minimumweight Title
20	Win	17–2–1	Ronnie Magramo	UD	12	Feb 27, 1994	Provincial Stadium, Phichit, Thailand	Retained IBF Minimumweight Title
19	Win	16–2–1	Felix Naranjo	TKO	2 (12)	Dec 10, 1993	Provincial Stadium, Suphan Buri, Thailand	Retained IBF Minimumweight Title
18	Win	15–2–1	Domingus Siwalette	TKO	4 (12)	Sep 26, 1993	Hua Mark Indoor Stadium, Bangkok, Thailand	Retained IBF Minimumweight Title
17	Win	14–2–1	Ala Villamor	TKO	7 (12)	Jun 27, 1993	National Stadium Gymnasium, Bangkok, Thailand	Retained IBF Minimumweight Title
16	Win	13–2–1	Nico Thomas	KO	7 (12)	Mar 14, 1993	Suranaree Camp Stadium, Nakhon Ratchasima, Thailand	Retained IBF Minimumweight Title
15	Win	12–2–1	Manny Melchor	SD	12	Dec 10, 1992	National Stadium Gymnasium, Bangkok, Thailand	Won IBF Minimumweight Title
14	Win	11–2–1	Al Tarazona	KO	5 (12)	Sep 06, 1992	Crocodile Farm, Samut Prakan, Thailand	
13	Win	10–2–1	Husni Ray	KO	4 (12)	Jun 14, 1992	Rajadamnern Stadium, Bangkok, Thailand	
12	Win	9–2–1	Ali Moril	KO	3 (?)	Feb 23, 1992	Sunarunchan Stadium, Nakhon Pathom, Thailand	
11	Win	8–2–1	Teelek Sorthanikul	TKO	5 (?)	Jan 29, 1992	Bangkok, Thailand	
10	Loss	7–2–1	Aswin Sithlakmuang	TKO	3 (?)	Dec 23, 1991	Bangkok, Thailand	
9	Win	7–1–1	Dao Singkrungthon	TKO	4 (?)	Sep 23, 1991	Bangkok, Thailand	
8	Loss	6–1–1	Aswin Sithlakmuang	PTS	10	Jul 17, 1991	Bangkok, Thailand	
7	Win	6–0–1	Kom Sorthanikul	PTS	6	Jun 17, 1991	Bangkok, Thailand	
6	Win	5–0–1	Dao Singkrungthon	PTS	6	Mar 28, 1991	Bangkok, Thailand	
5	Win	4–0–1	Dao Singkrungthon	PTS	6	Feb 07, 1991	Bangkok, Thailand	
4	Win	3–0–1	Rome Salothorn	TKO	3 (?)	Jan 10, 1991	Bangkok, Thailand	
3	Win	2–0–1	Inseethong Sorthanikul	TKO	2 (?)	Nov 22, 1990	Bangkok, Thailand	
2	Draw	1–0–1	Inseethong Sorthanikul	PTS	4	Nov 01, 1990	Bangkok, Thailand	
1	Win	1–0	Anusit Chokemchart	KO	1 (?)	Oct 04, 1990	Bangkok, Thailand	

== Titles in boxing ==
Major World Titles:

- IBF Mini Flyweight Champion (December 1992) (May 1996) (2x) (105 lbs)

Regional & International Titles:

- IBF International Mini Flyweight Champion (June 1992) (105 lbs)
- PABA Flyweight Champion (November 2007) (May 2009) (2x) (112 lbs)

Preceded by Manny Melchor	IBF Minimumweight Champion; 10 Dec 1992–15 Mar 1996; Failed to make weight	Succeeded by Ratanapol Sor Vorapin
Preceded by Ratanapol Sor Vorapin; Vacant	IBF Minimumweight Champion; 18 May 1996–27 Dec 1997	Succeeded by Zolani Petelo
