= Thai boxers rivalry =

The rivalry between Thai boxers in the world champion title. It's been 18 times until 2022.

== Rivarlies ==
No.	Between	Date	Location	Res.	Notes
1	Chartchai Chionoi vs. Puntip Keosuriya	July 26, 1967	Indoor Stadium Huamark, Bangkok	Chartchai KO 3rd round	Chionoi defended The Ring & WBC Flyweight titles for the first time.
2	Khaosai Galaxy vs. Kongtoranee Payakaroon	January 26, 1988	Lumpinee Boxing Stadium, Bangkok	Khaosai wins by unanimous decision	Galaxy defended WBA Junior bantamweight title for the 7th time.
3	Sot Chitalada vs. Muangchai Kittikasem	February 14, 1991	Ayutthaya Province Stadium, Ayutthaya province	Chitalada loses TKO 6th round	Chitalada lost Lineal & WBC Flyweight titles.
4	Muangchai Kittikasem vs. Sot Chitalada	February 28, 1992	Samutprakarn Crocodile Farm and Zoo, Samut Prakan province	Kittikasem TKO 9th round	Kittikasem defended WBC Flyweight title for the second time.
5	Daorung Chuvatana vs. Lakhin CP Gym	May 27, 1995	Nakhon Si Thammarat Province Stadium, Nakhon Si Thammarat province	draw	Chuvatana defended WBA Bantamweight title for the second time.
6	Daorung Chuvatana vs. Veeraphol Sahaprom	September 17, 1995	Siam Jusco, Nonthaburi province	Veeraphol wins by split decision	Chuvatana lost WBA Bantamweight title.
7	Mongkol Chor Charoen vs. Pornchai Sithpraprom	August 24, 1996	Fashion Island, Bangkok	Chor Charoen wins by unanimous decision	Chor Charoen defended WBF Mini flyweight title for the first time.
8	Pichit Chor Siriwat vs. Hadao CP Gym	March 1, 1998	Ratchawong Intersection, Chinatown, Bangkok	Chor Siriwat wins by unanimous decision	Chor Siriwat defended WBA Junior flyweight title for the second time.
9	Eagle Den Junlaphan vs. Oleydong Sithsamerchai	November 29, 2007	11th Infantry Regiment, King's Guard, Bangkok	Junlaphan loses by unanimous decision	Junlaphan lost WBC Minimumweight title.
10	Oleydong Sithsamerchai vs. Pornsawan Porpramook	November 27, 2008	City Hall Ground, Phitsanulok province	Sithsamerchai wins by unanimous decision	Sithsamerchai defended WBC Minimumweight title for the second time.
11	Oleydong Sithsamerchai vs. Pornsawan Porpramook	September 3, 2010	Kat Choeng Doi Market, Chiang Mai province	draw	Sithsamerchai defended WBC Minimumweight title for the 6th time.
12	Pongsaklek Wonjongkam vs. Suriyan Sor Rungvisai	October 8, 2010	Tambon Nong Hai Administration Organization, Sisaket province	Wonjongkam wins by unanimous decision	Wonjongkam defended Lineal, The Ring & WBC Flyweight titles for the first time in the second period.
13	Kwanthai Sithmorseng vs. Pigmy Kokietgym	November 5, 2010	Phranakhon Rajabhat University, Bangkok	Sithmorseng wins by unanimous decision	The bout for the vacant WBA Minimumweight title.
14	Wanheng Menayothin vs. Panya Pradabsri	November 27, 2020	City Hall Ground, Nakhon Sawan province	Menayothin loses by unanimous decision	Menayothin lost WBC Minimumweight title and suffered first defeat.
15	Knockout CP Freshmart vs. Pongsaklek Sithdabnij	October 5, 2021	Chang Arena, Buriram province	CP Freshmart TKO 3rd round	CP Freshmart defended WBA (Super) Minimumweight title for the 9th time.
16	Panya Pradabsri vs. Danai Ngiabphukiaw	November 2, 2021	City Hall Ground, Nakhon Sawan province	Pradabsri wins by unanimous decision	Pradabsri defended WBC Minimumweight title for the first time.
17	Panya Pradabsri vs. Wanheng Menayothin	March 29, 2022	City Hall Ground, Nakhon Sawan province	Pradabsri wins by unanimous decision	Pradabsri defended WBC Minimumweight title for the second time.
18	Knockout CP Freshmart vs. Wanheng Menayothin	July 20, 2022	City Hall Ground, Chonburi province	CP Freshmart wins by unanimous decision	CP Freshmart defended WBA (Super) Minimumweight title for the 11th time.
