= Zolani Petelo =

South African boxer (born 1975)

Personal information
- Nickname: Tiger
- Born: 21 September 1975 (age 51) Ibhayi, South Africa
- Height: 5 ft 6 in (168 cm)
- Weight: Mini-flyweight; Light-flyweight

Boxing career
- Reach: 68 in (173 cm)
- Stance: Southpaw

Boxing record
- Total fights: 24
- Wins: 17
- Win by KO: 9
- Losses: 5
- Draws: 2

Zolani Petelo (born 21 September 1975) is a South African former professional boxer who competed from 1993 to 2005. He held the International Boxing Federation (IBF) mini-flyweight title from 1997 to 2000 and challenged for the IBF junior-flyweight title in 2001.

== Professional career ==
Petelo turned professional in 1993, and accumulated a record of 10–2–2 before receiving his first shot at a world title in 1997.

=== Mini-flyweight ===
As a significant underdog, Petelo scored a fourth-round knockout over long reigning IBF mini-flyweight champion, Ratanapol Sor Vorapin, ending the champion's streak of 20 consecutive title fight victories. Petelo successfully defended his title five times against challengers Faisol Akbar, Carmelo Caceres, Eric Jamili, Juanito Rubillar, and Mickey Cantwell. He vacated the title in 2001 in order to move up in weight.

=== Junior-flyweight ===
On 29 September 2001, he unsuccessfully challenged IBF junior-flyweight champion, Ricardo López, losing by eighth-round knockout.

=== Retirement ===
Following the loss to Lopez, Petelo remained inactive for the following three and a half years. In 2005, he returned to the ring against former IBO champion Zolile Mbityi, losing a closely contested eight-round majority decision. After suffering another decision loss, Petelo retired from the sport of boxing.

== Professional boxing record ==
24 fights	17 wins	5 losses
By knockout	9	2
By decision	8	3
Draws	2	

No.	Result	Record	Opponent	Type	Round, time	Date	Location	Notes
24	Loss	17-5-2	Nkosana Sobethu	UD	8	17 Dec 2005	Orient Theatre, East London, South Africa	
23	Loss	17-4-2	Zolile Mbityi	MD	8	6 May 2005	Centenary Hall, Port Elizabeth, South Africa	
22	Loss	17-3-2	Ricardo Lopez	KO	8 (12) 1:32	29 Sep 2001	Madison Square Garden, New York City, New York, US	For IBF junior-flyweight title
21	Win	17-2-2	Roberto Gomez	PTS	8	22 Apr 2001	Carnival City, Brakpan, South Africa	
20	Win	16-2-2	Mickey Cantwell	TKO	8 (12)	2 Jun 2000	Stour Centre, Ashford, South Africa	Retained IBF mini-flyweight title
19	Win	15-2-2	Juanito Rubillar	UD	12	3 Dec 1999	Bushfield Leisure Centre, Peterborough, England	Retained IBF mini-flyweight title
18	Win	14-2-2	Eric Jamili	KO	1 (12) 1:21	29 May 1999	Carousel Casino, Hammanskraal, South Africa	Retained IBF mini-flyweight title
17	Win	13-2-2	Carmelo Caceres	TKO	7 (12)	4 Jul 1998	Carousel Casino, Hammanskraal, South Africa	Retained IBF mini-flyweight title
16	Win	12-2-2	Faisol Akbar	SD	12	21 Mar 1998	Carousel Casino, Hammanskraal, South Africa	Retained IBF mini-flyweight title
15	Win	11-2-2	Ratanapol Sor Vorapin	TKO	4 (12) 2:00	27 Dec 1997	Provincial Military Stadium, Songkhla, Thailand	Won IBF mini-flyweight title
14	Win	10-2-2	Mnyamezeli Shosha	KO	6 (8)	27 Sep 1997	Mdantsane Indoor Centre, East London, South Africa	
13	Loss	9-2-2	Neo Seboka	PTS	8	20 Apr 1997	Orient Theatre, East London, South Africa	
12	Loss	9-1-2	Lindi Memani	KO	10 (12)	19 Oct 1996	Orient Theatre, East London, South Africa	For South African mini-flyweight title
11	Win	9-0-2	Xola Made	KO	6 (8)	14 Jul 1996	Kwazakhele New Daku Hall, Port Elizabeth, South Africa	
10	Win	8-0-2	Mawanda Sineko	PTS	8	18 Feb 1996	Mdantsane Indoor Centre, East London, South Africa	
9	Win	7-0-2	Kholisile Nyanda	PTS	8	30 Apr 1995	Centenary Hall, New Brighton, Port Elizabeth, South Africa	
8	Win	6-0-2	Xolani Sithhole	KO	2 (6)	7 Aug 1994	Kwazakhele New Daku Hall, Port Elizabeth, South Africa	
7	Draw	5-0-2	Zolile Ngantweni	PTS	8	12 Jun 1994	Kwazakhele New Daku Hall, Port Elizabeth, South Africa	
6	Draw	5-0-1	Fezile Ngalo	PTS	8	27 Feb 1994	Kwazakhele New Daku Hall, Port Elizabeth, South Africa	
5	Win	5–0	Butana Kate	TKO	5 (6)	31 Oct 1993	Kwazakhele New Daku Hall, Port Elizabeth, South Africa	
4	Win	4–0	Joseph Nimrod	PTS	6	5 Sep 1993	Iqhayiya Tech School Hall, Port Elizabeth, South Africa	
3	Win	3–0	Goodman Nketyana	TKO	3 (4)	4 July 1993	Iqhayiya Tech School Hall, Port Elizabeth, South Africa	
2	Win	2–0	Sifundo Nyoka	PTS	4	23 May 1993	Iqhayiya Tech School Hall, Port Elizabeth, South Africa	
1	Win	1–0	Xola Made	PTS	4	3 Apr 1993	Centenary Hall, Port Elizabeth, South Africa	

== See also ==
- List of Mini-flyweight boxing champions

Sporting positions
World boxing titles
Preceded by Ratanapol Sor Vorapin	IBF mini-flyweight champion 27 December 1997 – 2 November 2000; Vacated	Vacant Title next held by Roberto Carlos Leyva
