= Mickey Cantwell =

English boxer

Personal information
- Nationality: British
- Born: 23 November 1964 (age 61) London, England
- Height: 5 ft 2 in (1.57 m)
- Weight: Mini flyweight; Light flyweight; Flyweight

Boxing career

Boxing record
- Total fights: 22
- Wins: 14
- Win by KO: 2
- Losses: 7
- Draws: 1

Mickey Cantwell (born 23 November 1964) is a British former professional boxer who competed from 1991 to 2001. He challenged for multiple world titles; the WBO light flyweight and mini flyweight titles in 1997; and the IBF mini flyweight title in 2000. At regional level, he held the British flyweight title in 1996.

== Career ==
=== Amateur ===
Born in London, Cantwell represented England in the light flyweight division at the 1990 Commonwealth Games in Auckland, New Zealand. Boxing for the Eltham & District ABC, he was twice winner of the prestigious ABA light-flyweight championship (1988 and 1989).

=== Professional ===
Cantwell turned professional in 1991 and, unbeaten in his first seven fights, beat Darren Fifield in April 1993 to take the vacant BBBofC Southern Area flyweight title. Five months later he challenged for Pablo Tiznado's WBC International light flyweight title, losing on points - his first professional defeat. In April 1994 he challenged for Luigi Camputaro's EBU European flyweight title, and again lost on points.

In March 1996 he faced Keith Knox for the vacant British flyweight title, winning on points to become British champion. Aiming for higher honours he relinquished the title, and in December 1997 faced Eric Jamili for the vacant WBO mini flyweight title; A cut to Cantwell's nose caused the fight to be stopped in the eighth round. In June 2000 he challenged Zolani Petelo for the IBF mini flyweight title, again stopped in the eighth round.

Cantwell had a small role in the 2000 film Snatch, playing Liam.

Cantwell's final fight came in September 2001 when he unsuccessfully challenged Jacob Matlala for the WBU light flyweight title, the South African stopping him in the fifth round.

After retiring from boxing, Cantwell was Chief Executive of the Professional Boxing Association and as a project worker for the Educational Sports Forum.

After an incident in September 2008 in which Cantwell knocked his manager Alan Irwin out during an argument at the Trades Union Congress in Brighton, he was convicted of assault causing actual bodily harm and sentenced to 200 hours of unpaid work.

Cantwell became a patron of the Boxing Futures charity and in 2011 opened Cantwell's Gym in Bromley.

== Professional boxing record ==
22 fights	14 wins	7 losses
By knockout	2	3
By decision	12	4
Draws	1	

No.	Result	Record	Opponent	Type	Round, time	Date	Location	Notes
22	Loss	14–7–1	Jacob Matlala	TKO	5 (12), 1:59	29 Sep 2001	Elephant & Castle Centre, London, England	For WBU light flyweight title
21	Loss	14–6–1	Zolani Petelo	TKO	8 (12), 0:59	2 Jun 2000	Stour Centre, Ashford, England	For IBF mini flyweight title
20	Win	14–5–1	Dave Coldwell	PTS	6	1 May 1999	Crystal Palace National Sports Centre, London, England	
19	Loss	13–5–1	Eric Jamili	TKO	8 (12), 1:22	19 Dec 1997	London Arena, London, England	For vacant WBO mini flyweight title
18	Win	13–4–1	Dave Coldwell	PTS	8	3 May 1997	NYNEX Arena, Manchester, England	
17	Loss	12–4–1	Jacob Matlala	SD	12	8 Feb 1997	London Arena, London, England	For WBO light flyweight title
16	Win	12–3–1	Krasimir Cholakov	PTS	6	29 Jun 1996	Erith Leisure Centre, London, England	
15	Win	11–3–1	Keith Knox	PTS	12	21 Mar 1996	Elephant & Castle Centre, London, England	Won vacant British flyweight title
14	Win	10–3–1	Anthony Hanna	PTS	6	2 Jul 1995	Point Theatre, Dublin, Ireland	
13	Win	9–3–1	Anthony Hanna	PTS	6	27 Apr 1995	York Hall, London, England	
12	Loss	8–3–1	Lyndon Kershaw	PTS	8	15 Jun 1994	Elephant & Castle Centre, London, England	
11	Loss	8–2–1	Luigi Camputaro	UD	12	27 Apr 1994	York Hall, London, England	For European flyweight title
10	Win	8–1–1	Anthony Hanna	PTS	8	3 Nov 1993	Whitchurch Sports Centre, Bristol, England	
9	Loss	7–1–1	Pablo Tiznado	UD	12	15 Sep 1993	York Hall, London, England	For vacant WBC International light flyweight title
8	Win	7–0–1	Darren Fifield	PTS	10	14 Apr 1993	Royal Albert Hall, London, England	Won vacant British (Southern Area) flyweight title
7	Draw	6–0–1	Louis Veitch	PTS	8	10 Feb 1993	Lewisham Theatre, London, England	
6	Win	6–0	Louis Veitch	PTS	6	16 May 1992	Alexandra Pavilion, London, England	
5	Win	5–0	Shaun Norman	PTS	8	14 Dec 1991	Crook Log Sports Club, London, England	
4	Win	4–0	Carlos Manrigue	TKO	5 (8), 0:55	23 Oct 1991	York Hall, London, England	
3	Win	3–0	Ricky Beard	PTS	8	30 Sep 1991	Royal Albert Hall, London, England	
2	Win	2–0	Mario Alberto Cruz Alfaro	PTS	6	26 Mar 1991	York Hall, London, England	
1	Win	1–0	Eduardo Vallejo	TKO	4 (6)	21 Jan 1991	Crystal Palace National Sports Centre, London, England	
