= Alfonso Zvenyika Lambarda =

Zimbabwean/Australian boxer (born 1975)

Personal information
- Nickname: Mosquito
- Nationality: Zimbabwean/Australian
- Born: 25 November 1975 (age 50) Mbare, Zimbabwe
- Height: 5 ft 9 in (175 cm)
- Weight: fly/super fly/bantam/super bantamweight

Boxing career

Boxing record
- Total fights: 32
- Wins: 17 (KO 10)
- Losses: 12 (KO 3)
- Draws: 2
- No contests: 1

Alfonso Zvenyika "Mosquito" Lambarda (born 25 November 1975 in Mbare) is a Zimbabwean/Australian professional fly/super fly/bantam/super bantamweight boxer of the 1990s and 2000s who won the Zimbabwe super flyweight title, African Zone 6 Flyweight Title, and Commonwealth light flyweight title, his professional fighting weight varied from 109 lb (49 kg; 7 st 11 lb), i.e. flyweight to 118 1/2 lb (53.8 kg; 8 st 6.5 lb), i.e. super bantamweight.
