= Kaaj Chartbandit =

Thai boxer

Hadao CP Gym
Personal information
- Nationality: Thai
- Born: Pornchai Techasinchai (พรชัย เตชสินชัย); 13 July 1970 (age 55) Bangkok, Thailand
- Weight: Flyweight; Light-flyweight

Boxing career
- Stance: Orthodox

Boxing record
- Total fights: 52
- Wins: 39
- Win by KO: 12
- Losses: 12

Kaaj Chartbandit (Thai: กาจ ชาติบัณฑิต) also known as Hadao CP Gym (ห้าดาว ซีพียิม) (born July 13, 1970) is a Thai former professional boxer who competed from 1987 to 1998, challenging for the WBA light-flyweight title twice in the 1990s.

== Biography and career ==
Chartbandit was born in eastern Bangkok, graduated from Minburi Technical College. He has been through a lot of amateur boxing at the youth level, including being the champion of the Department of Physical Education. Chartbandit turned pro in 1987 by fighting all Thai boxers, he was the Flyweight (112 lb) champion of Rajadamnern Stadium (comparable to Thailand champion) in 1993.

Niwat Laosuwanwat (manager and promoter of star Khaosai Galaxy) accepted the transfer of him into the stable. Laosuwanwat renamed him to "Hadao CP Gym" according to the brand name of the sponsoring company. He was considered the first athlete to be officially sponsored by Charoen Pokphand Group (CP).

CP Gym had the opportunity to challenge for the first world title with Leo Gámez the champion from Venezuela. The match was held at Rajadamnern Stadium in June 1994, during the FIFA World Cup in the United States was being competed. CP Gym who wore metallic green shorts with red stripe, fought well and able punched Gámez down to the ring floor for referee count to eight in the seventh round. But the decision was incredibly a draw, to the point where CP Gym stood on the ring with his hands clasped together and his mouth wide open in confusion. Like his staff and the spectator who exclaimed "What the hell!".

CP Gym continued boxing until he got older, his name was ranked in the Junior flyweight category of the three major organizations (WBA, WBC, IBF). In early March 1998 he had chance to challenge for the world championship for the second time with a younger fellow Thai title holder, Pichit Chor Siriwat in the mandatory fight. The bout takes place on an outdoor ring at the Ratchawong Intersection in Chinatown area, also considered part of the 1998 Chinese New Year celebrations.

Throughout the campaign, he appeared to be unable to fight Chor Siriwat especially in the final round he was almost knocked out. As a result, he was defeated by unanimous points from the three judges, 118–111, 118–112, and 109–108.

His final fight took place shortly after, when he lost with knockout in the third round against future WBC Flyweight world champion and the second one who able to knockout superstar Manny Pacquiao, Medgoen Singsurat, before retiring at the age of 30.

Hadao CP Gym was recognized by Leo Gámez as having the best defense skills opponent.

== See more ==
- Thai boxers rivalry
