= Nico Thomas =

Indonesian boxer

Personal information
- Nationality: Indonesian
- Born: Nicholas Thomas; 10 June 1966 (age 60) Ambon, Indonesia
- Weight: Mini flyweight

Boxing career
- Stance: Orthodox

Boxing record
- Total fights: 58
- Wins: 29
- Win by KO: 18
- Losses: 23
- Draws: 6

Nicholas "Nico" Thomas (born 10 June 1966) was an Indonesian professional boxer.

== Background ==
Thomas is the 12th of 16 children of Julianus Thomas and Helena Thomas. Nico Thomas is father of 3 sons Devitho, Danitho and Marcellino, from his wife Farida Ade Yani-Thomas. He was trained by his late elder brother, Charles Thomas, a former Indonesian amateur national champion when Nico was only 5 years old.

== Amateur career ==
- 1985: Silver medalist, SEA (South East Asia) Games, Bangkok
- 1986: Gold medalist, President's Cup IX, Jakarta.

== Professional career ==
Thomas became the IBF Strawweight champion after defeating Thai Samuth Sithnaruepol in Jakarta, Indonesia on 17 June 1989. Thomas, known as the second man of Indonesia to win a world boxing title, after Ellyas Pical, lost his title in his first defence against Eric Chavez of the Philippines. He also faced Andy Tabanas, among others.

Achievements
Preceded by Samuth Sithnaruepol	IBF minimumweight champion June 17, 1989 - September 21, 1989	Succeeded by Eric Chavez
