= World Boxing Organization =

Sanctioning organization for professional boxing bouts

- Abbreviation: WBO
- Formation: 1988; 38 years ago
- Type: Non-profit institution
- Purpose: Boxing sanctioning
- Headquarters: San Juan, Puerto Rico
- Region served: Worldwide
- President: Gustavo Olivieri
- Main organ: General Assembly
- Website: wboboxing.com

The World Boxing Organization (WBO) is an organization which sanctions professional boxing bouts. It is recognized by the International Boxing Hall of Fame (IBHOF) as one of the four major world championship groups, alongside the World Boxing Association (WBA), World Boxing Council (WBC), and International Boxing Federation (IBF). The WBO's headquarters are located in San Juan, Puerto Rico.

== History ==
The WBO started after a group of Puerto Rican and Dominican businessmen broke out of the WBA's 1988 annual convention in Isla Margarita, Venezuela over disputes regarding what rules should be applied.

The WBO's first president was Ramon Pina Acevedo of the Dominican Republic. Soon after its beginning, the WBO was staging world championship bouts around the globe. Its first championship fight was for its vacant super middleweight title, between Thomas Hearns and James Kinchen; Hearns won by decision. In order to gain respectability, the WBO next elected former world light heavyweight champion José Torres of Ponce, Puerto Rico, as its president. Torres left in 1996, giving way to Puerto Rican lawyer Francisco Valcarcel as president. Valcarcel held the position until October 2024, he then stepped down and this gave way to the election of Puerto Rican attorney Gustavo Olivieri.

While the IBF had awarded recognition to Larry Holmes soon after its inception in 1983 (as they did with several established champions in the lower weight divisions), the WBO sanctioned a fight between two relatively unknown fighters, Francesco Damiani (winner of the super heavyweight silver medal at the 1984 Summer Olympics) and Johnny DuPlooy, to determine the inaugural holder of its own heavyweight title in 1989. All other sanctioning bodies of boxing recognized the then-undefeated Lineal champion Mike Tyson as the undisputed heavyweight champion. Damiani, meanwhile, went on to become the first WBO heavyweight champion. At heavyweight, especially in the United States, the organization initially struggled to gain credibility as a major sanctioning body, with WBO heavyweight champions Michael Moorer, Riddick Bowe, and Henry Akinwande relinquishing the title to pursue other options. Boxing publication The Ring also did not recognize the WBO, despite having recognized the IBF after its inception in 1983, five years prior to the WBO.

In the lighter weight divisions, however, long-reigning champions during the 1990s such as Chris Eubank, Dariusz Michalczewski, Johnny Tapia, and Naseem Hamed gave the WBO title increasingly more prestige. The WBO was also made popular by boxers such as Marco Antonio Barrera, Oscar De La Hoya, Nigel Benn, Ronald "Winky" Wright, Joe Calzaghe, and Wladimir Klitschko, all of whom held its title.

On August 23, 1997, WBC minimumweight champion Ricardo López won the WBO minimumweight title by knocking out Puerto Rican fighter Alex Sánchez. After the bout, López told a Mexican newspaper that he wanted to give his newly won championship belt to his father, who is a boxing fan. WBO president Francisco Valcarcel said he viewed that comment as a public resignation and declared the title vacant without holding a hearing or notifying López. The WBO sanctioned a bout between Eric Jamili (10–5–1) and Mickey Cantwell (13–4–1) to fill the vacancy despite protests by López.

In Europe, the WBO was more accepted during its early years than in the U.S., and WBO champions always fared well in unification bouts with WBA, WBC, and IBF champions. For example, WBO light heavyweight champion Dariusz Michalczewski unified his title with the WBA and IBF titles by defeating Virgil Hill on June 13, 1997. WBO featherweight champion Naseem Hamed also defeated the reigning WBA, WBC and IBF champions in the same weight class. By 2000, the WBA was giving the same recognition to WBO champions as it did to WBC and IBF champions.

In 2004 the WBC began naming WBO champions on its ranking listings. The IBF did not recognize the WBO in May 2006, but was doing so by February 2007. WBO regulations explicitly recognize the other three sanctioning bodies. For many years, as with the IBF, boxers based in Japan were not permitted to fight for WBO titles. In 2012, the Japan Boxing Commission (JBC) recognized the governing body. In August 2016, the WBO Asia Pacific Championship was recognized by the JBC and the Japan Professional Boxing Association (JPBA).

WBO men's championship belts are brown, whereas women's championship belts are pink.

In response to the Russian invasion of Ukraine, the WBO blocked championship fights involving Russian and Belarusian boxers.

== Super titles ==
Since the early 2000s, the WBO has awarded the honorary title of "Super Champion" to certain boxers, in any given weight class, who fulfil a set of distinguished criteria. Boxers who have been named WBO Super Champion include: Anthony Joshua, Wladimir Klitschko, Oleksandr Usyk (Cruiserweight & Heavyweight), Joe Calzaghe, Oscar De La Hoya, Bernard Hopkins, Jermain Taylor, Kelly Pavlik, Saúl Álvarez, Juan Manuel Márquez, Juan Díaz, Naoya Inoue, Manny Pacquiao, Timothy Bradley, Marco Antonio Barrera, Acelino Freitas, Jorge Arce, Omar Narváez, Donnie Nietes, Kosei Tanaka, Iván Calderón, Marco Huck, Sergey Kovalev, Vasyl Lomachenko, and Terence Crawford. There are currently only two female boxers who earned the distinction of "Super Champion": Amanda Serrano and Claressa Shields.

This title is not an actual world championship in the same vein as the WBA's Super titles; it is more akin to a lifetime achievement award. A boxer awarded the status of WBO Super Champion cannot win the title from or lose it to another boxer; recognition as Super Champion can be maintained even if a boxer moves to another weight class.

== Ranking system ==
The WBO publishes monthly rankings, with fighters that win regional championships sanctioned by its subsidiaries being given priority. The World Championship Committee exists to name a mandatory challenger, whom the incumbent champion is forced to fight within an arbitrary timeframe, when this term should be extended, when eliminatories are warranted and when a title is stripped. The body is also responsible for determining who the challengers should be in the case of vacancy or the necessity of an interim title. Exception to this rule are those recognized as "Super Champions", who can directly challenge for the world championship in another division even if they have not fought in it before. There are other superficial differences between the WBO and other bodies, such as the listing of the 140 lb. division as "junior welterweight", whereas the WBC uses the term "super lightweight".

Prior to the WBO being recognized as a major sanctioning body, the system displayed vulnerability when deceased boxer Darrin Morris was moved up twice in the super-middleweights in 2001. In addition, Morris had only fought once in the three years before his death, beating a fighter with only 17 wins out of 81 fights. Morris was Number 7 at the time of his death and Number 5 when the WBO discovered the error. Valcarcel said, "We obviously missed the fact that Darrin was dead. It is regrettable." Valcarcel also stated that other boxing sanctioning organizations had made similar errors in the past by continuing to rank another boxer after he was dead. One week after British newspaper The Independent broke the story of Morris's posthumous advance in the rankings, one of the three men ranking the boxers, Gordon Volkman, still had not heard that Morris was dead.

== Relationship with other bodies ==
Under Valcárcel, the WBO was the only sanctioning body that was absent from a summit held in 2014 where the possibility of a single champion per division was to be discussed. In 2014, he publicly opposed the awarding of half-points within the 10-Point Must System favored by the other three. Individually, Valcárcel has also been critical of the WBC for creating the "Maya Belt" and placing it in play in fights where the WBO title was at stake. Another topic that he commented negatively about was the WBA's sanctioning of up to four champions per division. Despite this, following the onset of the COVID-19 pandemic and the economic impact on the sport, the WBO invited the presidents of the other organizations to a reunion of its executive board held in October 2021. The main topic of concern was how to manage the mandatory challengers of unified and undisputed champions, in lieu of the promoters and television/streaming platforms complaining about the logistics of consecutive obligatory defenses. This was the first time that the leaders of the four main organizations met personally, with the idea of sanctioning a single champion per division being discussed.

== In other media ==
The series finale of Japanese manga series Bleach revolves around the main cast gathering to watch a fight in which a character named Yasutora Sado is involved, having become a professional boxer ten years after the storyline and challenging for the WBO world heavyweight championship. The entity has, on occasion, been involved in other areas of sports entertainment, such as when it allowed René Santiago to defend the North American Boxing Organization minimumweight title in a staged match against Fernando Tonos as part of a professional wrestling card held by the International Wrestling Association (IWA-PR). The WBO World Heavyweight Championship also appears as a minor storyline element in Creed III, as one of the belts held by the titular character as undisputed titlist of his division.

== Current WBO world title holders ==
As of 2 November 2026

=== Male ===
Weight class	Champion	Reign began	Days
Mini flyweight (105 lbs)	Ryūsei Matsumoto	2 November 2026	0
Junior flyweight (108 lbs)	René Santiago	13 March 2025	599
Flyweight (112 lbs)	Anthony Olascuaga	20 July 2024	835
Junior bantamweight (115 lbs)	Kenshiro Teraji	20 July 2026	105
Bantamweight (118 lbs)	Christian Medina	14 September 2025	414
Junior featherweight (122 lbs)	Naoya Inoue	25 July 2023	1196
Featherweight (126 lbs)	Rafael Espinoza	9 December 2023	1059
Junior lightweight (130 lbs)	O'Shaquie Foster	24 October 2026	9
Lightweight (135 lbs)	Abdullah Mason	22 November 2025	345
Junior welterweight (140 lbs)	Shakur Stevenson	31 January 2026	275
Welterweight (147 lbs)	Devin Haney	22 November 2025	345
Junior middleweight (154 lbs)	Jaron Ennis	27 June 2026	128
Middleweight (160 lbs)	Vacant		
Super middleweight (168 lbs)	Vacant		
Light heavyweight (175 lbs)	Dmitry Bivol	22 February 2025	618
Light heavyweight (175 lbs)	Callum Smith (Interim)	22 February 2025	618
Junior heavyweight (200 lbs)	David Benavidez	2 May 2026	184
Heavyweight (200+ lbs)	Daniel Dubois	9 May 2026	177

=== Female ===
Weight class	Champion	Reign began	Days
Atomweight (102 lbs)	Vacant		
Mini flyweight (105 lbs)	Sarah Bormann	30 December 2024	672
Junior flyweight (108 lbs)	Estefany Alegria	13 June 2026	142
Flyweight (112 lbs)	Gabriela Fundora	2 November 2024	730
Junior bantamweight (115 lbs)	Mizuki Hiruta	1 December 2022	1432
Bantamweight (118 lbs)	Cherneka Johnson	11 July 2025	479
Junior featherweight (122 lbs)	Vacant		
Featherweight (126 lbs)	Amanda Serrano	10 December 2016	3614
Junior lightweight (130 lbs)	Alycia Baumgardner	15 October 2022	2193
Lightweight (135 lbs)	Terri Harper	28 September 2024	765
Junior welterweight (140 lbs)	Katie Taylor	25 November 2023	1073
Welterweight (147 lbs)	Mikaela Mayer	27 September 2024	766
Junior middleweight (154 lbs)	Chantelle Cameron	5 April 2026	211
Middleweight (160 lbs)	Desley Robinson	11 April 2025	570
Super middleweight (168 lbs)	Lani Daniels	17 April 2026	199
Light heavyweight (175 lbs)	Vacant		
Heavyweight (175+ lbs)	Claressa Shields	2 February 2025	638

== WBO affiliated organizations ==
- North American Boxing Organization (NABO)
- WBO Latino
- WBO Asia Pacific
- WBO Oriental
- WBO International
- WBO Global
- WBO Pan Asia Pacific
- WBO Intercontinental
- Indian Professional Boxing Association (IPBA)

== See also ==
- List of major boxing sanctioning bodies
- List of WBO world champions
- List of WBO female world champions
- List of current world boxing champions
