= Buster Douglas vs. Evander Holyfield =

Boxing match

The Moment of Truth
- Date: October 25, 1990
- Venue: The Mirage, Paradise, Nevada
- Title(s) on the line: WBA, WBC and IBF undisputed heavyweight championship

Tale of the tape
Boxer	James Douglas	Evander Holyfield
Nickname	Buster	The Real Deal
Hometown	Columbus, Ohio	Atlanta, Georgia
Purse	$24,075,000	$8,025,000
Pre-fight record	30–4–1 (1) (20 KO)	24–0 (20 KO)
Age	30 years, 6 months	28 years
Height	6 ft 4 in (193 cm)	6 ft 2 in (188 cm)
Weight	246 lb (112 kg)	208 lb (94 kg)
Style	Orthodox	Orthodox
Recognition	WBA, WBC and IBF undisputed Heavyweight Champion; The Ring; No. 1 Ranked Heavyweight; The Ring No. 6 ranked pound-for-pound fighter	WBA/WBC/IBF; No. 1 Ranked Heavyweight; The Ring; No. 3 Ranked Heavyweight; Former undisputed cruiserweight champion

Result
- Holyfield wins via 3rd-round KO

Buster Douglas vs. Evander Holyfield, billed as The Moment of Truth, was a heavyweight championship boxing match on October 25, 1990, for the WBA, WBC, and IBF heavyweight championships. The bout took place at the Mirage in Paradise, Nevada, USA and saw Douglas making the first defense of the titles he won from Mike Tyson in February 1990.

== Background ==
After becoming the first boxer in history to win all three major sanctioning organizations' world titles in the cruiserweight division, Evander Holyfield decided to move up in class and take on the top heavyweights. In his first fight at heavyweight he defeated James Tillis by knockout and then knocked out former champion Pinklon Thomas before the year was out. Shortly after that Holyfield became regarded as the No. 1 contender to Mike Tyson, who was the undisputed champion of the division and who in 1988 won the lineal championship from Michael Spinks. A match between the two was signed for June 18, 1990, and Tyson elected to take a tuneup fight on February 11, 1990, against fringe contender James "Buster" Douglas in Tokyo. Despite having been regarded as a top contender for the title in the past, Douglas' reputation was as a lazy, out-of-shape fighter who did not pay much attention to his training. As a result, most casinos didn't even bother to make odds for the fight. The only one that did so, the Mirage, installed Tyson as a 42-1 favorite. Douglas was not given much chance to last against him. Not only had Tyson never been defeated, but he had only gone the distance four times in his career and had not gone past the fifth round with an opponent since Tyrell Biggs took him to the seventh round in 1987.

Douglas, however, had other plans and subjected a stunned champion to a severe pounding. Tyson was so unprepared that his corner did not bring the proper equipment to the fight, with no ice bag or endswell, and was forced to use a latex glove filled with water to try to reduce the swelling to his eye. Despite being knocked down in the eighth round, Douglas bounced back and knocked Tyson out in the tenth round to claim the title in what was called by Jim Lampley, broadcasting the fight for HBO, as "the single biggest upset in the history of heavyweight championship fights." The fight was not without controversy, however, as Tyson's promoter Don King, claimed that referee Octavio Meyran had not properly counted the knockdown on Douglas from the eighth round (saying that Douglas was down for ten seconds and not the eight count he received), and that the result should be reversed and Tyson should instead be declared the winner. The WBA and WBC initially agreed with King and announced that they would not recognize Douglas as champion until they reviewed the allegations, though the IBF accepted the result as valid. After much public backlash, King rescinded his protest and both organizations officially recognized Douglas as champion. King's objections were, in fact, illegitimate, as according to the rules of boxing, the referee's verbal count is what is binding. Though Tyson and his camp had hoped for a rematch Douglas ultimately decided to defend his title against the top contender and signed a fight with Holyfield. Prior to the fight, it was announced that Douglas and Holyfield would split a $32,100,000 purse with Douglas guaranteed a then-record $24,075,000, the largest purse ever paid to a single fighter at the time. Holyfield, meanwhile, would earn $8,025,000.

== Pioneering Television Sales ==
Casino mogul Steve Wynn, then chairman of the Mirage Hotel and Casino in Las Vegas, hosted the Douglas-Holyfield fight and made an unprecedented move to manage the television pay-per-view and international sales through his own organization with the help of individual consultants with expertise. Typically the pay-per-view rights were sold to local US cable operators via either Showtime or HBO, and international rights were sold through the champion's promoter. Wynn hired Mike Trainer, known best for his work as an attorney for Sugar Ray Leonard to distribute the international rights directly for the Mirage, and sought out an entrepreneurial television producer who would produce, manage, and arrange distribution to over 100 countries around the world. He selected Alexis Denny, formerly of ABC Sports and CBS News, who had been one of the only people in sports television to work on all 3 Leonard-Duran fights, boxing's most well-known trilogy of the 80s. Denny set up a distribution plan for providing interviews and training footage, in addition to other promotional material on behalf of the Mirage, to broadcasters on every continent, including major rights holders in the United Kingdom, Japan, Brazil, Germany, Australia and more. From a business perspective, the rights fees earned and the reviews of the international production created by Denny and Wynn were a big success. The fight itself, however, proved more disappointing.

== The fight ==
An out-of-shape Douglas came into the fight weighing 246 pounds, 15 pounds heavier than he was for the Tyson fight. A lean and fit Holyfield came into the fight weighing only 208 pounds and dominated the sluggish Douglas, winning both the first and second rounds. In the third round, Douglas attempted to hit Holyfield with an uppercut. Not only did Douglas telegraph the punch, he missed Holyfield completely and knocked himself off balance. Holyfield countered with a straight right to Douglas' chin, knocking the champion flat on his back as referee Mills Lane counted him out. Douglas remained on the canvas for several seconds after the knockout and needed to be helped up twice before he got to his corner.

== Aftermath ==
Douglas was heavily criticised for both his excessive weight gain and his lackluster in-ring performance. His former promoter King was particularly critical, shooting down any chance of a Douglas–Tyson rematch while also calling Douglas' performance "disgraceful". Douglas left boxing after this, not to return until 1996. He won the first six fights of his comeback before being knocked out in the first round by Lou Savarese. He won his next two fights before retiring for good in 1999.

Holyfield's first defense of his title came on April 19, 1991, against former heavyweight champion George Foreman, who had returned from retirement in 1987, after almost exactly 10 years away from boxing since losing to Jimmy Young, in Atlantic City. After Holyfield defeated Foreman by unanimous decision after 12 rounds, the long-awaited match between Holyfield and Tyson, who defeated Donovan Ruddock in two fights for the #1 contendership to the title, was signed for November 8, 1991, in Las Vegas. However, an injury and Tyson's subsequent arrest and incarceration for allegedly raping Desiree Washington scuttled these plans. Holyfield instead fought Bert Cooper on November 23, 1991, in his hometown of Atlanta and knocked him out in the seventh round. Holyfield made one more defense of his title, against another former champion out of retirement Larry Holmes, in June 1992, before losing to Riddick Bowe in November 1992. Holyfield regained the WBA and IBF titles from Bowe in a 1993 rematch, losing them to Michael Moorer in 1994. After a brief retirement due to a misdiagnosed heart condition, Holyfield returned to the ring and upset WBA champion Tyson in a November 1996 fight to become only the second (after Muhammad Ali) fighter to win a heavyweight title three times. He defeated Tyson in their 1997 rematch, then followed it with a defeat of Moorer in a rematch to reclaim the IBF title. After losing his titles in a unification fight with Lennox Lewis in 1999, Holyfield won his fourth heavyweight title by defeating John Ruiz for the WBA title in 2000. He promptly lost the title in his next fight against Ruiz, and after a draw in their third match, Holyfield largely faded away from the title scene.

== Undercard ==
Confirmed bouts:

Winner	Loser	Weight division/title belt(s) disputed	Result
(United States) Riddick Bowe	(United States) Bert Cooper	Heavyweight (10 rounds)	2nd-round TKO.
(United States) Andrew Maynard	(United States) Keith McMurray	Light heavyweight (8 rounds)	Unanimous decision.
(Argentina) Hugo Ariel Hernandez	(Zambia) Musonda Chinungu	Super lightweight (8 rounds)	1st-round TKO.
(United States) Floyd Weaver	(United States) Michael Ward	Super welterweight (6 rounds)	Majority decision.
(United States) David Sample	(United States) Steve Barreras	Super lightweight (4 rounds)	Unanimous decision
(United States) Kenny Whack	(United States) Jose Emanuel Varela	Super welterweight (4 rounds)	Majority decision.

== Broadcasting ==
Country	Broadcaster
Mexico	Televisa
Philippines	Islands TV 13
United Kingdom	The Sports Channel (BSB)
United States	Showtime
Thailand	Channel 3

Preceded by vs. Mike Tyson	Buster Douglas's bouts 25 October 1990	Succeeded by vs. Tony LaRosa
Preceded by vs. Seamus McDonagh	Evander Holyfield's bouts 25 October 1990	Succeeded by vs. George Foreman
