= Evander Holyfield vs. Lennox Lewis II =

Boxing competition

Unfinished Business
- Date: November 13, 1999
- Venue: Thomas & Mack Center, Paradise, Nevada, U.S.
- Title(s) on the line: WBA, WBC, IBF, and vacant IBO undisputed heavyweight championship

Tale of the tape
Boxer	Evander Holyfield	Lennox Lewis
Nickname	The Real Deal	The Lion
Hometown	Atlanta, Georgia, U.S.	London, England
Purse	$15,000,000	$15,000,000
Pre-fight record	36–3–1 (25 KO)	34–1–1 (27 KO)
Age	37 years	34 years, 2 months
Height	6 ft 2 1/2 in (189 cm)	6 ft 5 in (196 cm)
Weight	217 lb (98 kg)	242 lb (110 kg)
Style	Orthodox	Orthodox
Recognition	WBA and IBF; Heavyweight Champion; The Ring; No. 2 Ranked Heavyweight; 2-division undisputed world champion	WBC; Heavyweight Champion; The Ring pound-for-pound No. 10 ranked fighter The Ring; No. 1 Ranked Heavyweight

Result
- Lewis wins via 12-round unanimous decision (115–113, 116–112, 117–111)

Evander Holyfield vs. Lennox Lewis II, billed as Unfinished Business, was a professional boxing match contested on November 13, 1999 for the WBA, WBC, IBF, and vacant IBO undisputed heavyweight championship.

== Background ==
The two fighters had met eight months prior in Madison Square Garden. Though many felt Lewis had seemingly done enough to win, the bout was declared a draw, with one judge ruling the fight in favor of Lewis 116–113, another scoring the fight in Holyfield's favor with a score of 115–113 and the third declaring the fight even at 115–115. The ruling became one of the most controversial in boxing history, and as such, the three sanctioning bodies quickly ordered a rematch between the two.

A week after this first fight, Holyfield and Lewis agreed to the rematch, with the fight's US$30 million purse being evenly split between them. The match was originally scheduled for September, but was pushed back to November 13, with Las Vegas' Thomas & Mack Center being announced as the site of the fight. The fight was to occur exactly seven years after Riddick Bowe defeated Holyfield to become the last undisputed heavyweight champion. The men were to fight for the titles of the three major sanctioning bodies as well as the lesser-regarded IBO heavyweight title which had been stripped from Brian Nielsen prior to the fight.

== The fight ==
Like in the previous fight, Lewis gained an early advantage, winning both rounds 1 and 2. Lewis won round 3 on two of the judges' scorecards, but a late rally from Holyfield during the final 30 seconds in which he landed several punches, including a hard right to the side of Lewis' head, helped him win on the third judge's scorecard. Holyfield then won the next four rounds. In an entertaining round 7, the two fighters fought in the middle of ring during the final 20 seconds, each landing several punches. Lewis seized control of the fight by winning rounds 8 to 11. The men fought a close round 12, but Lewis again took the round on two of the judges' scorecards.

Lewis was named the winner by unanimous decision with scores of 115–113, 116–112 and 117–111, becoming the first undisputed heavyweight champion in nearly seven years. Judge Chuck Giampa- who scored the fight 116-112 for Lewis- remarked "there was a lot of pre-fight pressure due to the fact Marc (Ratner, executive director of the Nevada State Athletic Commission) guaranteed there would not be any controversy. That was probably one of the more stressful fights I've done."

HBO's Harold Lederman had the bout scored 116–112 for Lewis and the AP had it 116–113 also for the new unified champion. In contrast, the New York Post and ESPN both scored the fight 116–112 for Holyfield while the Las Vegas Sun saw the bout as a draw at 114–114.

=== Dispute over Decision ===
Although not as contentious as the decision of their first bout had been, the result of the rematch was also widely challenged as many observers believed that Holyfield should have kept his unified championship by winning a decision or earning a draw. The New York Times reported, "There were no knockdowns in the fight, but many people at ringside felt Holyfield landed more telling blows and should have won the bout." Mike Costello of BBC Sport wrote "Some writers, British as well as American, felt Holyfield had done enough to get his hand raised at the finish. When a draw would have been a fair result, Lewis got the nod... a reversal of eight months earlier."

Some believed that the decision in the rematch had been politically predetermined due to the controversy of the first fight. Writing for ESPN.com, Tim Graham described Lewis' victory as a "make-good decision" and a "robbery in reverse" while Richard Hoffer of Sports Illustrated perceived the unanimous decision as being "payback" against Holyfield and that the result was due to "carryover from the first bout."

UK journalist Steve Bunce scored the second fight a draw and observed that contrary to the official ruling, most spectators believed Holyfield had won the rematch with Lewis. Writing in The Independent, Bunce remarked that the disputed decision for Lewis had been “viewed as justice” due to the boxing establishment having been under pressure to "get it right” in the rematch.

== Aftermath ==
Following the bout, Lewis was angered by reports that his trainer, Emanuel Steward, had stated that he believed Holyfield had won the rematch against his fighter. Lewis' promoter at the time, Panos Eliades, was ultimately able to resolve the situation between the two men after Steward claimed that he had been misquoted in saying Lewis lost and instead had conceded that many observers scored the second fight for Holyfield.

Lewis' reign as undisputed heavyweight champion lasted less than six months. The WBA wanted Lewis to defend the championship against their number one contender John Ruiz. However, Lewis wanted to first defend his titles against Michael Grant. The WBA and Lewis agreed that he would fight Grant first followed by Ruiz. Ruiz's promoter Don King challenged the decision in court and a clause was found in Lewis' contract that stated the winner of the Holyfield–Lewis fight would first defend his titles against the WBA's number one contender. Because of this, Lewis was stripped of his WBA title. He proceeded with his match against Grant, successfully defending his remaining titles after defeating Grant by 2nd round knockout. The WBA then created a "Super World Champion" title allowing unified champions more time in between mandatory title defenses.

The WBA chose Holyfield to face Ruiz for the vacant WBA Heavyweight title. Holyfield defeated Ruiz by unanimous decision to regain the title, becoming the first four-time heavyweight champion in boxing history. He lost the title to Ruiz in his next fight and then fought Ruiz a third time, this time to a draw. He then met Hasim Rahman in a title eliminator bout to determine who would face Lewis for the heavyweight championship. Though Holyfield defeated Rahman with the expectation of a third fight between them, Lewis instead opted to face Mike Tyson and Lewis–Holyfield III never materialized.

This would be the last fight for the undisputed heavyweight championship until Oleksandr Usyk defeated Tyson Fury on May 18, 2024.

== Undercard ==
Confirmed bouts:

== Broadcasting ==
Country	Broadcaster
Canada	TSN
France	Canal+
Philippines	VTV (IBC)
United Kingdom	Sky Sports
United States	HBO

Preceded by First Fight	Evander Holyfield' bouts 13 November 1999	Succeeded by vs. John Ruiz
Preceded by First Fight	Lennox Lewis's bouts 13 November 1999	Succeeded by vs. Michael Grant
