= Evander Holyfield vs. Seamus McDonagh =

Boxing match

- Date: June 1, 1990
- Venue: Convention Hall, Atlantic City, New Jersey
- Title(s) on the line: WBC Continental Americas heavyweight title

Tale of the tape
Boxer	Evander Holyfield	Seamus McDonagh
Nickname	The Real Deal	
Hometown	Atlanta, Georgia, U.S.	Enfield, County Meath, Ireland
Purse	$1,250,000	$100,000
Pre-fight record	23–0 (19 KO)	19–1–1 (14 KO)
Age	27 years, 7 months	
Height	6 ft 2 in (188 cm)	6 ft 0 in (183 cm)
Weight	210 lb (95 kg)	211 3/4 lb (96 kg)
Style	Orthodox	Orthodox
Recognition	WBA/WBC/IBF; No. 1 Ranked Heavyweight; The Ring; No. 3 Ranked Heavyweight; WBC Continental Americas heavyweight champion Former undisputed cruiserweight champion	WBA; No. 9 Ranked Heavyweight; WBC; No. 12 Ranked Heavyweight

Result
- Holyfield won by 4th round TKO

Evander Holyfield vs. Seamus McDonagh was a professional boxing match contested on June 1, 1990, for the WBC continental Americas heavyweight title.

== Background ==
As 1989 came to an end, Evander Holyfield was the number-one ranked heavyweight contender after going 5–0 and winning each fight via stoppage. In January 1990, after over a year of speculation, Holyfield had finally secured a heavyweight title match against undisputed heavyweight champion Mike Tyson. The fight was scheduled for June 18, but Tyson would first have to get past James "Buster" Douglas, whom he was to face in Tokyo on February 11. Holyfield would make the trip to Japan see his would-be opponent up close, but in a shocking upset Douglas would defeat Tyson by 10th-round knockout, effectively cancelling the planned Tyson–Holyfield bout. Tyson and promoter Don King pushed for an immediate rematch, but Douglas refused and instead chose to face Holyfield. However, with the Douglas–Holyfield bout set for October 1990 and Holyfield having not fought since November 1989, it was announced that Holyfield would face Seamus McDonagh in what was to be a "tuneup" prior to facing Douglas. McDonagh was 19–1–1 in 20 professional fights and at the time of his fight with Holyfield, was an English Literature major at St. John's University. Though he was a sizable underdog, McDonagh used Douglas' defeat of Tyson as inspiration that he too could pull off an upset, stating "What Buster Douglas did to Mike Tyson excites me and gives me confidence. I think I can do it here." whilst also claiming that he had "more power than Holyfield's last two opponents (Adílson Rodrigues and Alex Stewart) and I have speed."

== The fight ==
As the fight round began, McDonagh charged toward Holyfield and backed him into a corner, causing Holyfield to respond by tackling McDonagh to the canvas. McDonagh would continue to be aggressive, but a sharp left uppercut sent McDonagh down. McDonagh was able to continue and threw a left hook that missed Holyfield, who again tackled McDonagh to the canvas. With 30 seconds left in round one, Holyfield countered a McDonagh left with a right that sent McDonagh down for a second official knockdown. With the three-knockdown rule in effect, Holyfield would attack an exhausted McDonagh with 15 seconds remaining, though McDonagh was able to survive after clinching Holyfield within the rounds final five seconds. Holyfield would continue to wear down McDonagh in rounds two and three before ending the fight 44 second into round four. The end came as the two fighters were exchanging punches before Holyfield landed a left hook that sent McDonagh down through the ropes. McDonagh would get back up at the referee's count of nine, but as he was clearly hurt, Joe Cortez stopped the fight, giving Holyfield the TKO victory.

== Undercard ==
Confirmed bouts:

== Broadcasting ==
Country	Broadcaster
United States	Showtime

Preceded by vs. Alex Stewart	Evander Holyfield's bouts 1 June 1990	Succeeded by vs. Buster Douglas
Preceded by vs. Michael Greer	Seamus McDonagh's bouts 1 June 1990	Succeeded by vs. Jesse Shelby
