= Kid Shamrock =

Kid Shamrock is the Off Broadway play based on the life of former world rated boxer, "Irish" Bobby Cassidy.

The story tells of Cassidy's struggle and subsequent triumph over alcohol. Cassidy lost a fight to Jorge Ahumada on the undercard of the second Muhammad Ali-Joe Frazier fight at Madison Square Garden. The Irish light heavyweight spent more time drinking than training for that fight, the biggest of his career. Cassidy turned the biggest loss of his career into a victory by quitting the bottle. He has not had a drink since April 1974. That night at the Garden is the basis for the play.

The play was written by Cassidy's older son, Bobby Cassidy Jr. There have been four productions of Kid Shamrock since 2007.

== Description ==
The calling card of the play is its authenticity. Numerous professional boxers have been cast throughout the production. Seamus McDonagh, who fought Evander Holyfield in 1990, has held the title role since the play's debut in 2007. Other professional boxers who have appeared in the play include, John Duddy, Mark McPherson, Tommy Rainone, Olympic gold medalist and WBA welterweight champion Mark Breland, WBO junior welterweight champion Christopher Algieri and five-time world champion Junior Jones. Cassidy Sr. serves as the play's narrator.

The referee for the play's boxing scenes have always been real referees. Wayne Kelly, who officiated more than 50 world title fights, held the role of referee until his passing in 2012. Ian McGrady understudied Wayne Kelly at the Atlantic Theater II production, and carried the dual roles of "Referee" and "Bartender" to the TADA Theater production. Arthur Mercante Jr., himself a ref in dozens of title fights, took over the role in August 2012.

Michael Bentt, the former WBO heavyweight champion, has been the play's director for the last two productions. Bentt starred as Sonny Liston opposite Will Smith in the 2001 film, "Ali." The last two runs of Kid Shamrock have been executive produced by David Schuster.

In August 2012, Schuster and boxing promoter Bob Duffy teamed to produce, "Shamrock in the Park," an outdoor presentation of the play that was followed by a nine-bout professional boxing card. Professional boxer Richie Neves acted in the play and later that evening won a six-round decision on the boxing card.

Mercante Jr. also performed in the play and refereed the live fights that followed.

Patrick Joseph Connolly and Vinny Vella, both of whom appeared in The Sopranos, are veteran Kid Shamrock cast members.

== Productions ==
- Kid Shamrock, June 2007, The Producer's Club, NYC, directed by Gary Morgan
- Kid Shamrock, February 2011, Atlantic Theater Company, NYC, directed by James Smallhorne
- Kid Shamrock, November 2011, TADA Theater, NYC, directed by Michael Bentt
- Shamrock in the Park, August 2012, Franklin Square, Long Island, directed by Michael Bentt
