= Evander Holyfield vs. George Foreman =

Boxing match

The Battle of the Ages
- Date: April 19, 1991
- Venue: Boardwalk Hall, Atlantic City, New Jersey, U.S.
- Title(s) on the line: WBA, WBC and IBF undisputed heavyweight championship

Tale of the tape
Boxer	Evander Holyfield	George Foreman
Nickname	The Real Deal	Big
Hometown	Atlanta, Georgia, U.S.	Houston, Texas, U.S.
Purse	$20,000,000	$12,500,000
Pre-fight record	25–0 (21 KO)	69–2 (65 KO)
Age	28 years, 6 months	42 years, 3 months
Height	6 ft 2 1/2 in (189 cm)	6 ft 4 in (193 cm)
Weight	208 lb (94 kg)	257 lb (117 kg)
Style	Orthodox	Orthodox
Recognition	WBA, WBC and IBF undisputed Heavyweight Champion; The Ring; No. 1 Ranked Heavyweight; The Ring No. 5 ranked pound-for-pound fighter 2-division undisputed world champion	WBA/IBF; No. 2 Ranked Heavyweight; WBC; No. 3 Ranked Heavyweight; The Ring; No. 9 Ranked Heavyweight; Former undisputed heavyweight champion

Result
- Holyfield wins via 12-round unanimous decision (116-111, 115-112, 117-110)

Evander Holyfield vs. George Foreman, billed as The Battle of the Ages, was a professional boxing match contested on April 19, 1991 for the WBA, WBC, and IBF heavyweight championships.

== Background ==
On October 25, 1990, Evander Holyfield defeated James "Buster" Douglas by third round knockout to become the Undisputed Heavyweight Champion. Prior to his match with Douglas, Holyfield delayed a potential fight with Mike Tyson, instead agreeing to face 42-year-old George Foreman for the titles should he defeat Douglas. Since ending his 10-year retirement in 1987, Foreman was a perfect 24–0, with 23 of his wins coming via knockout. With Foreman's popularity at an all-time high coupled with the fact that he could possibly become the oldest Heavyweight champion in boxing history, anticipation for the bout was high. As such, the two fighters received high payouts, Holyfield was guaranteed $20 million, while Foreman took home a guaranteed $12.5 million. Despite his age, the outspoken Foreman remained confident that he could dethrone Holyfield and in the months before the fight often said as much in the media. Not to be outdone, Holyfield's manager Dan Duva lampooned Foreman's weight, infamously stating that the fight should be called "The Real Deal" vs. "The Big Meal" and "Some people say George is as fit as a fiddle. But I think he looks more like a cello."

== The fight ==
The fight is perhaps best remembered for its memorable round 7. At the beginning of the round, Holyfield was the aggressor, throwing several jabs as Foreman stood back, seemingly waiting for an opportunity to land a powerful right hand. Seconds later, Holyfield missed with a left hook, which led to Foreman countering with a big right hook to Holyfield's head. Foreman would then become the aggressor and continue his attack on Holyfield, landing several punches within the round's first minute. As the second minute of the round began, Holyfield rebounded and proceeded to land a 15-second, multiple punch combination that staggered Foreman. Though Holyfield's barrage of punches seemed to tire Foreman, he nevertheless was able to survive the remainder of the round without going down.

Foreman had a point deducted in round eleven for a low blow.

Though Foreman was able to stay competitive throughout the fight, Holyfield ultimately won the fight via unanimous decision, winning all three judges scorecards by scores of 116–111, 115–112, and 117–110 (erroneously announced as "117-100" by Michael Buffer). Foreman, however, impressed many by going the distance with the much younger champion.

HBO's Harold Lederman scored the fight 119–108 for Holyfield, giving Foreman only the sixth round. The Associated Press had it 118–110 for Holyfield, giving Foreman rounds three and five. Ring magazine had the fight 116–113 for Holyfield.

== Aftermath ==
The fight was a huge success financially, becoming for a time the highest-grossing boxing match of all time. The bout brought in approximately $55 million from pay-per-view buys, with 1.45 million American homes purchasing the fight. Also, an additional $8 million was made from the live gate, with an estimated 19,000 fans attending the fight live.

Many thought this would be Foreman's last chance at the Heavyweight championship. Foreman, however, would shock the boxing world over three years later by defeating Michael Moorer to become the oldest Heavyweight champion at age 45.

== Undercard ==
Confirmed bouts:

== Broadcasting ==
Country	Broadcaster
United Kingdom	Sky Movies
United States	HBO

Preceded by vs. Buster Douglas	Evander Holyfield's bouts April 19, 1991	Succeeded by vs. Bert Cooper
Preceded by vs. Terry Anderson	George Foreman's bouts April 19, 1991	Succeeded by vs. Jim Ellis
