= Evander Holyfield vs. Alex Stewart =

Boxing match

Undefeated
- Date: November 4, 1989
- Venue: Trump Plaza, Atlantic City, New Jersey, U.S.
- Title(s) on the line: WBC Continental Americas heavyweight title

Tale of the tape
Boxer	Evander Holyfield	Alex Stewart
Nickname	The Real Deal	The Destroyer
Hometown	Atlanta Georgia, U.S.	Brooklyn, New York, U.S.
Purse	$1,200,000	$225,000
Pre-fight record	22–0 (18 KO)	24–0 (24 KO)
Age	27 years	25 years, 4 months
Height	6 ft 2 in (188 cm)	6 ft 3 in (191 cm)
Weight	212 lb (96 kg)	213 lb (97 kg)
Style	Orthodox	Orthodox
Recognition	WBA/WBC/IBF; No. 1 Ranked Heavyweight; The Ring; No. 2 Ranked Heavyweight; WBC Continental Americas heavyweight champion Former undisputed cruiserweight champion	WBA; No. 2 Ranked Heavyweight; IBF; No. 10 Ranked Heavyweight; WBC; No. 13 Ranked Heavyweight

Result
- Holyfield wins via 8th-round technical knockout

Evander Holyfield vs. Alex Stewart, billed as Undefeated, was a professional boxing match contested on November 4, 1989 for the WBC continental Americas heavyweight title.

== Background ==
Holyfield had dispatched heavyweight contender Adílson Rodrigues in his previous fight in July 1989 to retain both the WBC Continental Americas heavyweight title and his number one ranking in the heavyweight division. For his next fight, Holyfield's team negotiated with a number of heavyweight contenders including George Foreman, Tim Witherspoon, Orlin Norris and Alex Stewart. Holyfield's promoter Dan Duva agreed to give Foreman a $1.5 million purse, but Foreman would not sign the contract at the time as he was also engaged in talks with Don King about a title fight with Mike Tyson. Duva claimed that Foreman only wanted to fight "easy guys", though Foreman stated " I'd like to know about Tyson before I get serious about Holyfield." In August, it was announced that Holyfield would meet Stewart on November 4 instead. Stewart entered the fight with Holyfield with a perfect 24–0 record with all 24 wins coming by way of knockout, though nearly all his opponents were unheralded journeyman. Nevertheless, Stewart was the number two ranked heavyweight by the WBA behind only Holyfield and was earning a $225,000 purse, the largest payday of his career up to that point.

== The fight ==
In what was a tough fight for both competitors, Holyfield would earn an eighth-round technical knockout victory. Holyfield would get the better of Stewart in the fights first four rounds and opened a cut beside Stewart's right eye which would get deeper as the fight went on and hinder Stewart the rest of the fight. Stewart would finally break through, landing a left-right combination that stunned Holyfield. Stewart would continue to land powerful right hands and left hooks before Holyfield began trading punches with Stewart to finish the round. After losing the fifth round, Holyfield would go on the attack in sixth round, landing a series of left hooks that widened the cut on Stewart's eye and caused blood to gush from the wound. Though clearly hurt from the exchange, Stewart would survive the remainder of the round. Though Stewart's corner tried to stop the blood flow between rounds, Stewart continued to bleed profusely. With only nine seconds remaining the eighth round, referee Tony Perez finally halted the action so the ringside physician could examine Stewart's eye, after a brief examination, the physician ordered the fight stopped and Holyfield was announced as the winner by TKO at 2:51 of round eight.

== Aftermath ==
Holyfield's manager, Dan Duva, told post-fight news conference. "OK, where are the wise guys who said Alex Stewart couldn't fight? He fought a beautiful fight."

== Fight card ==
Confirmed bouts:

Weight Class	Weight		vs.		Method	Round	Time	Notes
Heavyweight	200+ lb	Evander Holyfield (c)	def.	Alex Stewart	TKO	8/12		^{Note 1}
Welterweight	147 lb	Héctor Camacho	def.	Raul Torres	UD	10/10
Welterweight	147 lb	Romallis Ellis	def.	Junior Rodriguez	KO	2/8
Heavyweight	200+ lb	Riddick Bowe	def	Garing Lane	TKO	4/6

^Note 1 For WBC Continental Americas heavyweight title

== Broadcasting ==
Country	Broadcaster
United States	Showtime

Preceded by vs. Adílson Rodrigues	Evander Holyfield's bouts 4 November 1989	Succeeded by vs. Seamus McDonagh
Preceded by vs. Terry Armstrong	Alex Stewart's bouts 4 November 1989	Succeeded by vs. Mark Young
