= Pichit Chor Siriwat =

Thai boxer and muay thai fighter

- Born: Sompoch Harnvichachai (สมโภชน์ หาญวิชาชัย); January 31, 1975 (age 51); Tambon Noen Sa-nga, Chatturat District (now Noen Sa-nga District), Chaiyaphum Province, Thailand
- Nickname: Ai-mud phi sung (ไอ้หมัดผีสั่ง) "The Possessed Punch"
- Height: 162 cm (5 ft 4 in)
- Division: Mini flyweight Junior flyweight Flyweight
- Reach: 168 cm (66 in)
- Style: Muay Thai; Boxing
- Stance: Southpaw

Professional boxing record
- Total: 37
- Wins: 34
- By knockout: 14
- Losses: 3

Other information
- Notable relatives: Pichit Sitbangprachan (elder brother)
- Boxing record from BoxRec

Pichit Chor Siriwat (Thai: พิชิต ช.ศิริวัฒน์; stylized as Pichit Siriwat; born 31 January 1975), also known as Pichitnoi Sitbangprachan (พิชิตน้อย ศิษย์บางพระจันทร์), is a retired Thai professional boxer and Muay Thai fighter who was the WBA junior flyweight world champion in the late 1990s.

== Biography and boxing career ==
Pichit is the younger brother of Pichit Sitbangprachan, a Thai boxer who won the IBF flyweight world title in the early 1990s. Both were boxers under Songchai Rattanasuban's stable.

Pichit made his professional boxing debut under the name "Pichitnoi Sitbangprachan" (The Little Pichit) and got his first world title shot on October 9, 1994, against WBA junior flyweight champion Leo Gámez of Venezuela at Ramkhamhaeng University. He lost by TKO in the sixth round due to limited experience.

Songchai continued to support his career and changed his ring name to "Pichit Chor Siriwat" after politician Chaipak Siriwat, who became his sponsor. In 1995, he won the PABA light flyweight title and defended it once. He earned a second world title opportunity on December 3, 1996, against Japanese titleholder Keiji "Prince" Yamaguchi at Osaka Prefectural Gymnasium in Osaka. This time, he won the championship by TKO in the second round.

He went on to defend his title five times, including a win over veteran Thai boxer Kaaj Chartbandit (Hadao CP Gym), who had previously challenged Leo Gámez for the world title in 1994 but was unsuccessful. That bout was held on March 1, 1998, at Ratchawong Intersection in Bangkok's Chinatown as part of the Chinese New Year 1998 celebration. In early 2000, he was stripped of the title for failing to defend it within the required timeframe.

In early 2002, he received a third world title shot against Nicaragua's Rosendo Álvarez at Jai Alai Fronton in Miami, but was defeated by TKO in the final round.

He continued fighting and remained in the rankings for a while. He later traveled to Japan as both a boxer and a trainer for Ioka Boxing Gym, owned by Hiroki Ioka, a former Japanese world champion in two weight classes. However, due to low pay, he eventually returned to Thailand.

He now lives in his hometown of Chaiyaphum, where he runs a tilapia farming business.

== Professional boxing record ==
37 fights	34 wins	3 losses
By knockout	14	3
By decision	20	0

No.	Result	Record	Opponent	Type	Round, time	Date	Location	Notes
37	Win	34–3	Yuki Murai	MD	8	Oct 14 2007	Prefectural Gymnasium, Osaka, Japan	
36	Loss	33–3	Junichi Ebisuoka	TKO	8 (10)	Sep 11, 2005	IMP Hall, Osaka, Japan	
35	Win	33–2	Sittichai Sor Sittichai	KO	1 (6)	Dec 29 2004	Rajadamnern Stadium, Bangkok, Thailand	
34	Win	32–2	Allan Ranada	UD	6	Nov 2, 2004	Ubon Ratchathani, Thailand	
33	Win	31–2	Gerald Ubatay	UD	6	Jun 4, 2004	Lang Suan, Thailand	
32	Win	30–2	Yongki Afrizal	TKO	6 (10)	Nov 27, 2003	Watrangboa School, Lop Buri, Thailand	
31	Win	29–2	Marvin Gumban	TKO	4 (8)	Aug 15, 2003	The Mall Shopping Center, Bangkok, Thailand	
30	Win	28–2	Acasio Simbajon	UD	6	Jun 27, 2003	The Mall Shopping Center Taphra, Bangkok, Thailand	
29	Win	27–2	Acasio Simbajon	UD	10	Apr 4, 2003	Chaiyaphum, Thailand	
28	Loss	26–2	Rosendo Alvarez	TKO	12 (12), 2:10	19 Jan 2002	Jai Alai Fronton, Miami, Florida, United States	For the WBA light-flyweight title
27	Win	26–1	Roy Tarazona	UD	10	Dec 5, 2001	Bangkok, Thailand	
26	Win	25–1	Eugene Gonzales	UD	10	Apr 27, 2001	Bang Saphan, Thailand	
25	Win	24–1	Alpong Navaja	KO	4 (10)	Dec 10, 2000	Lop Buri, Thailand	
24	Win	23–1	Marlon Arlos	PTS	10	Oct 8, 2000	Phon Thong, Thailand	
23	Win	22–1	Sang Ik Yang	UD	12	Feb 5, 2000	Mall Department Store, Bangkok, Thailand	Retained the WBA light flyweight title
22	Win	21–1	Joma Gamboa	UD	12	Feb 20, 1999	Chaweng Beach Arena, Ko Samui, Thailand	Retained the WBA light flyweight title
21	Win	20–1	Tae Kil Lee	RTD	7 (12)	Oct 17, 1998	Central Plaza Hotel, Bangkok, Thailand	Retained the WBA light flyweight title
20	Win	19–1	Kaaj Chartbandit	UD	12	Mar 1, 1998	Grand China Princess Hotel Stadium, Bangkok, Thailand	Retained the WBA light flyweight title
19	Win	18–1	Sang Chul Lee	UD	12	Jun 29, 1997	Main Stadium, Ratchaburi, Thailand	Retained the WBA light flyweight title
18	Win	17–1	Keiji Yamaguchi	TKO	2 (12)	Dec 3, 1996	Prefectural Gymnasium, Osaka, Japan	Won the WBA light flyweight title
17	Win	16–1	Apolonaris Heatuban	UD	12	Jun 1, 1996	The Mall Shopping Center Bangkae, Bangkok, Thailand	Retained the PABA Light flyweight title
16	Win	15–1	Feras Taborat	KO	2 (12)	Apr 7, 1996	Uttaradit, Thailand	Retained the PABA Light flyweight title
15	Win	14–1	Reynante Rojo	PTS	12	Jan 28, 1996	Municipal Stadium, Kanchanaburi, Thailand	
14	Win	13–1	Fel Magestrado	PTS	12	Jan 14, 1996	Municipal Hall Grounds, Nonthaburi, Thailand	
13	Win	12–1	Roger Espanola	TKO	12 (12)	Oct 7, 1995	Bangkok, Thailand	Retained the PABA Light flyweight title
12	Win	11–1	Apolonaris Heatuban	UD	12	Aug 5, 1995	Channel 7 Studios, Bangkok, Thailand	Won the PABA Light flyweight title
11	Win	10–1	Neil Caga	TKO	7 (12)	May 7, 1995	Ank-Seng Samakee Stadium, Hat Yai, Thailand	
10	Win	9–1		PTS	10	Mar 5, 1995	Bangkok, Thailand	
9	Win	8–1	Ric Magramo	TKO	3	Nov 20, 1994	Ha Chieng Plaza, Chiang Rai, Thailand	
8	Loss	7–1	Leo Gamez	TKO	6 (10), 2:00	Oct 9, 1994	Ramkhamhaeng University, Bangkok, Thailand	For the WBA light flyweight title
7	Win	7–0	Leo Ramirez	MD	10	Jul 16, 1994	Uttaradit province, Thailand	
6	Win	6–0	Domingus Siwalette	PTS	10	Jun 12, 1994	Watthana Nakhon district, Sa Kaeo province Thailand	
5	Win	5–0	Nico Thomas	TKO	3	May 8, 1994	Ratchaburi, Thailand	
4	Win	4–0	Nikki Maca	TKO	1	Feb 13, 1994	Chachoengsao, Thailand	
3	Win	3–0	Susanto	TKO	1	Nov 14, 1993	Bangkok, Thailand	
2	Win	2–0	Melvin Magramo	TKO	3	Oct 3, 1993	Chaiyaphum, Thailand	
1	Win	1–0	Melvin Magramo	PTS	10	Aug 8, 1993	Bangkok, Thailand	

== Muay Thai record ==
Muay Thai record
Date	Result	Opponent	Event	Location	Method	Round	Time
1993-	Win	(Thailand) Panphet Muangsurin	Onesongchai, Lumpinee Stadium	Bangkok, Thailand	Decision	5	3:00
1993-05-07	Win	(Thailand) Kompayak Singmanee	Onesongchai, Lumpinee Stadium	Bangkok, Thailand	Decision	5	3:00
1993-03-29	Win	(Thailand) Satchanoi Sor.Pinya	Kiatsingnoi + Chaturong 14, Rajadamnern Stadium	Bangkok, Thailand	Decision	5	3:00
1993-03-10	Win	(Thailand) Thanurith Kaowichit	Lumpinee Stadium	Bangkok, Thailand	KO	2	
1993-01-19	Loss	(Thailand) Kompayak Singmanee	Lumpinee Stadium	Bangkok, Thailand	Decision (Unanimous)	5	3:00
For the Lumpinee Stadium Mini Flyweight (105 lbs) title.
1992-12-28	Win	(Thailand) Jomphet Singhkiree	Lumpinee Stadium	Bangkok, Thailand	Decision	5	3:00
1992	Win	(Thailand) Samkor Chor.Rathchatasupak	Lumpinee Stadium	Bangkok, Thailand	KO (Punches)	3	
?	Win	(Thailand) Monsawan Thongracha	Lumpinee Stadium	Bangkok, Thailand	KO (Punches)	1	
1992-05-29	Win	(Thailand) Kongthoraneelek Kiatthaworn	Lumpinee Stadium	Bangkok, Thailand	Decision	5	3:00
1991-04-05	Win	(Thailand) Hussein Sor.lukindia	Lumpinee Stadium	Bangkok, Thailand	KO	2	
1991-02-02	Win	(Thailand) Satchanoi Sor.Phinya	Onesongchai, Lumpinee Stadium	Bangkok, Thailand	KO (Elbow)	5	
1991-01-11	Win	(Thailand) Samingthong Petchwihan	Lumpinee Stadium	Bangkok, Thailand	Decision	5	3:00
Legend: Win Loss Draw/No contest Notes

Vacant Title last held by Keiji Yamaguchi	WBA light flyweight champion December 3, 1996 – July 2000; Stripped	Vacant Title last held by Beibis Mendoza
