= Evander Holyfield vs. Adílson Rodrigues =

Boxing match

- Date: July 15, 1989
- Venue: Caesars Tahoe, Stateline, Nevada, U.S.
- Title(s) on the line: WBC Continental Americas heavyweight title

Tale of the tape
Boxer	Evander Holyfield	Adílson Rodrigues
Nickname	"The Real Deal"	"Maguila"
Hometown	Atlanta, Georgia, U.S.	São Paulo, São Paulo, Brazil
Purse	$1,250,000	$300,000
Pre-fight record	21–0 (17 KO)	35–2 (26 KO)
Age	26 years, 8 months	31 years, 1 month
Height	6 ft 2 in (188 cm)	6 ft 1 in (185 cm)
Weight	207 lb (94 kg)	221 lb (100 kg)
Style	Orthodox	Orthodox
Recognition	WBA/WBC; No. 1 Ranked Heavyweight; WBC Continental Americas heavyweight champion Former undisputed cruiserweight champion	WBC; No. 2 Ranked Heavyweight; WBA; No. 3 Ranked Heavyweight

Result
- Holyfield won by 2nd round KO

Evander Holyfield vs. Adílson Rodrigues was a professional boxing match contested on July 15, 1989 for the WBC continental Americas heavyweight title.

== Background ==
In his previous fight, Evander Holyfield had captured the WBC Continental Americas heavyweight title after defeating Michael Dokes by a TKO in round 10 on March 11, 1989. The winner was expected to become the next-in-line for a shot at Mike Tyson's undisputed heavyweight title, but Tyson's promoter Don King chose to forgo the anticipated Tyson–Holyfield bout and instead organized a fight between Tyson and Dokes (Tyson would eventually face James "Buster" Douglas as his next opponent after a money dispute between Dokes and King) After failing to get a match with Tyson, Holyfield moved on to face Adílson Rodrigues in what would be the first defense of his Continental Americas title. Rodrigues was the number two ranked heavyweight by the WBC behind Holyfield and had enlisted the help of legendary trainer Angelo Dundee, but was instilled as a major 11–1 underdog.

== The fight ==
Rodrigues would get off to a good start, controlling the first round by landing frequent shots to both Holyfield's body and head. Rodrigues would start the second round aggressively, continuing to throw power punches at Holyfield. However, the fight would come to a sudden end when midway through the round Holyfield landed a left-right combination followed by an overhand right that dropped Rodrigues who was knocked out cold after his head hit the canvas. Rodrigues would not move as referee Mills Lane counted to 10 and Holyfield was declared the winner by knockout at 1:29 of the round. Rodrigues would lie motionless on the canvas for over a minute before his corner was able to revive him.

== Aftermath ==
Lane would say after the fight "I could have counted to 50, at 10 he wasn't moving. That Holyfield has a heavy hand."

== Undercard ==
Confirmed bouts:

== Broadcasting ==
Country	Broadcaster
United States	Showtime

Preceded by vs. Michael Dokes	Evander Holyfield's bouts 15 July 1989	Succeeded by vs. Alex Stewart
Preceded by vs. Mike Rouse	Adílson Rodrigues's bouts 15 July 1989	Succeeded by vs. Walter Armando Masseroni
