= Rosendo Álvarez =

Nicaraguan boxer (born 1970)

Personal information
- Nickname: El Bufalo
- Born: Rosendo José Álvarez Hernández; May 6, 1970 (age 56) Managua, Nicaragua
- Height: 5 ft 5 in (165 cm)
- Weight: Mini-flyweight; Light-flyweight; Flyweight

Boxing career
- Reach: 65 in (165 cm)
- Stance: Orthodox

Boxing record
- Total fights: 43
- Wins: 37
- Win by KO: 24
- Losses: 4
- Draws: 2

Rosendo José Álvarez Hernández (born May 6, 1970) is a Nicaraguan former professional boxer who competed from 1992 to 2012. He is a world champion in two weight classes, having held the World Boxing Association (WBA) mini-flyweight title from 1995 to 1998, the WBA light-flyweight title from 2001 to 2004, and the inaugural Ring magazine light-flyweight title from 2003 to 2004.

== Professional career ==
Álvarez made his professional debut on May 23, 1988. He accumulated a record of 19-0, which included a TKO victory over future champion José Bonilla, before challenging for a world title.

One of his trainers was María Toto.

=== WBA mini-flyweight title ===
On December 2, 1995, he traveled to Thailand and won the World Boxing Association mini-flyweight title by close split decision over undefeated Thai champion Chana Porpaoin, who was 9-0 in title fights. In 1996, he defended his title three times including a third round knockout over future champion Kermin Guardia, a decision win over former champion Eric Chavez, and an eighth round knockout over undefeated prospect Takashi Shiohama. He had one bout in 1997, an eleventh round knockout over undefeated future interim champion Songkram Porpaoin (twin brother of Chana), for his fourth title defense.

=== Fights with López ===
In 1998, he fought to a draw with undefeated reigning WBC mini-flyweight champion and pound-for-pound ranked Ricardo Lopez, dropping Lopez for the first and only time in his career. The fight was stopped in the 8th round when Lopez suffered a cut from a clash of heads, resulting in a technical draw on the scorecards. A rematch was set for later in the year, however, the fight was in jeopardy of taking place as Alvarez failed to make weight by 3 1/4 pounds. He was stripped of the title and the two met at an over the 105-pound strawweight limit, with the WBA title being on the line for Lopez only. Alvarez lost the rematch by a 12-round split decision, suffering his first loss as a professional.

=== WBA light-flyweight title ===
Álvarez then moved up to the 108 lb division and won his following three fights, including a decision victory over future champion Tomás Rojas. On August 12, 2000, he lost by seventh round disqualification for repeated low blows to Beibis Mendoza for the vacant WBA light-flyweight title. He later avenged this loss by twelve round split decision to claim the title. In his following fight, he faced Pichit Siriwat, who had previously defended the same WBA title five times before being stripped of it in 2000 for failing to defend it against Alvarez. He defeated Siriwat by 12th-round TKO. In 2003, he defeated Mendoza for a second time by decision and gained recognition as Ring light flyweight champion. Later that year, he fought to a twelve-round draw against then-IBF champ José Víctor Burgos in a unification bout. In 2004, he was stripped of his WBA and Ring light-flyweight titles prior to a fourth meeting with Mendoza, due to his failure to make weight. He went on to win the fight by split decision.

=== WBC flyweight title loss and doping controversy ===
On May 8, 2006, he challenged Jorge Arce for the interim WBC flyweight title, but was defeated by 6th round tko. After the fight, Álvarez was suspended by the Nevada Athletic Commission for the rest of 2006 and fined $2,000 because he failed a post-fight urinalysis. Álvarez tested positive for the banned diuretic Furosemide, also known as Lasix.

=== Retirement ===
Álvarez is a promoter and manager in his native Nicaragua and it is assumed that the Arce fight was his last effort as a combatant.

=== Comeback ===
In 2012, Álvarez returned to the ring at age 42, but lost by 5th round disqualification.

== Professional boxing record ==
| 43 fights | 37 wins | 4 losses |
|---|---|---|
| By knockout | 24 | 1 |
| By decision | 13 | 1 |
| By disqualification | 0 | 2 |
| Draws | 2 | |

| No. | Result | Record | Opponent | Type | Round, time | Date | Location | Notes |
|---|---|---|---|---|---|---|---|---|
| 43 | Loss | 37–4–2 | Jean Sampson | DQ | 5 (8), 1:40 | 26 May 2012 | Polideportivo Espana, Managua, Nicaragua | |
| 42 | Loss | 37–3–2 | Jorge Arce | KO | 6 (12), 1:54 | 8 Apr 2006 | Thomas & Mack Center, Las Vegas, Nevada, United States | For WBC interim flyweight title |
| 41 | Win | 37–2–2 | Eduardo Pacheco | TKO | 6 (10), 2:54 | 4 Feb 2006 | Centro de Convenciones Figali, Panama City, Panama | |
| 40 | Win | 36–2–2 | Jorge Romero | TKO | 6 (10), 0:10 | 10 Dec 2005 | Gran Casino Rodeo, Tipitapa, Nicaragua | |
| 39 | Win | 35–2–2 | Julio Grimaldo | UD | 10 | 29 Oct 2005 | Casino Las Vegas, Managua, Nicaragua | |
| 38 | Win | 34–2–2 | Regulo Gamez | KO | 7 (10), 2:55 | 26 Feb 2005 | Universidad de Managua, Managua, Nicaragua | |
| 37 | Win | 33–2–2 | Beibis Mendoza | SD | 12 | 2 Oct 2004 | Madison Square Garden, New York City, New York, United States | |
| 36 | Draw | 32–2–2 | Víctor Burgos | SD | 12 | 13 Dec 2003 | Boardwalk Hall, Atlantic City, New Jersey, United States | Retained WBA and The Ring light-flyweight titles; For IBF light-flyweight title |
| 35 | Win | 32–2–1 | Beibis Mendoza | MD | 12 | 31 Mar 2003 | Statehouse Convention Center, Little Rock, Arkansas, United States | Retained WBA light-flyweight title; Won inaugural The Ring light-flyweight title |
| 34 | Win | 31–2–1 | Pichit Chor Siriwat | TKO | 12 (12), 2:10 | 19 Jan 2002 | Jai Alai Fronton, Miami, Florida, United States | Retained WBA light-flyweight title |
| 33 | Win | 30–2–1 | David Torres | KO | 3 (10), 2:05 | 14 Dec 2001 | Polideportivo Espana, Managua, Nicaragua | |
| 32 | Win | 29–2–1 | Beibis Mendoza | SD | 12 | 3 Mar 2001 | Mandalay Bay Resort & Casino, Las Vegas, Nevada, United States | Won WBA light-flyweight title |
| 31 | Win | 28–2–1 | Cipriano Landa | TKO | 2 (10) | 8 Dec 2000 | Hotel Intercontinental, Managua, Nicaragua | |
| 30 | Loss | 27–2–1 | Beibis Mendoza | DQ | 7 (12), 1:02 | 12 Aug 2000 | Paris Las Vegas, Las Vegas, Nevada, United States | For vacant WBA light-flyweight title |
| 29 | Win | 27–1–1 | Tomás Rojas | UD | 10 | 11 Mar 2000 | Gimnasio Polideportivo Espana, Managua, Nicaragua | |
| 28 | Win | 26–1–1 | Arturo Velazquez | TKO | 2 (8), 2:09 | 18 Dec 1999 | Grand Casino, Tunica, Mississippi, United States | |
| 27 | Win | 25–1–1 | Paulino Villalobos | UD | 10 | 27 Feb 1999 | Gimnasio La Salle, Managua, Nicaragua | |
| 26 | Loss | 24–1–1 | Ricardo López | SD | 12 | 13 Nov 1998 | Hilton Hotel, Las Vegas, Nevada, United States | WBC and vacant WBA mini-flyweight titles at stake only for López as Álvarez missed weight |
| 25 | Draw | 24–0–1 | Ricardo López | TD | 7 (12), 3:00 | 7 Mar 1998 | Plaza de Toros, Mexico City, Mexico | Retained WBA mini-flyweight title; For WBC mini-flyweight title |
| 24 | Win | 24–0 | Songkram Porpaoin | TKO | 11 (12), 2:14 | 11 Jan 1997 | Aranyaprathet, Thailand | Retained WBA mini-flyweight title |
| 23 | Win | 23–0 | Takashi Shiohama | KO | 8 (12), 1:26 | 1 Oct 1996 | City Sogo Gym, Kitakyushu, Japan | Retained WBA mini-flyweight title |
| 22 | Win | 22–0 | Eric Chavez | MD | 12 | 15 Jun 1996 | City Gymnasium, Sendai, Japan | Retained WBA mini-flyweight title |
| 21 | Win | 21–0 | Kermin Guardia | KO | 3 (12), 1:23 | 30 Mar 1996 | Estadio Nacional, Managua, Nicaragua | Retained WBA mini-flyweight title |
| 20 | Win | 20–0 | Chana Porpaoin | SD | 12 | 2 Dec 1995 | Provincial Gymnasium, Sa Kaeo, Thailand | Won WBA mini-flyweight title |
| 19 | Win | 19–0 | Vidal Cerna | TKO | 6 (10) | 2 Sep 1995 | Gimnasio Alexis Arguello, Managua, Nicaragua | |
| 18 | Win | 18–0 | Alfredo Virgen | UD | 10 | 15 Jul 1995 | Gimnasio La Salle, Managua, Nicaragua | |
| 17 | Win | 17–0 | Abel Andres | KO | 1 (10) | 1 Apr 1995 | Gimnasio Alexis Arguello, Managua, Nicaragua | |
| 16 | Win | 16–0 | Juan González | TKO | 2 (10) | 18 Feb 1995 | Gimnasio Alexis Arguello, Managua, Nicaragua | |
| 15 | Win | 15–0 | Alfredo Toro | KO | 1 (10) | 17 Dec 1994 | Hotel Intercontinental, Managua, Nicaragua | |
| 14 | Win | 14–0 | Andres Tavarez | TKO | 2 (12) | 26 Nov 1994 | Gimnasio Alexis Arguello, Managua, Nicaragua | Retained WBA Fedelatin mini-flyweight title |
| 13 | Win | 13–0 | José Bonilla | TKO | 11 (12) | 23 Sep 1994 | Maracay, Venezuela | Won WBA Fedelatin mini-flyweight title |
| 12 | Win | 12–0 | Jaime Díaz | TKO | 1 (10) | 10 Sep 1994 | Gimnasio Alexis Arguello, Managua, Nicaragua | |
| 11 | Win | 11–0 | Juan Antonio Torres | TKO | 6 (10) | 16 Jul 1994 | Gimnasio Alexis Arguello, Managua, Nicaragua | |
| 10 | Win | 10–0 | Oscar Vargas | UD | 8 | 30 Apr 1994 | Gimnasio Central, San Salvador, El Salvador | |
| 9 | Win | 9–0 | Carlos Puente | KO | 1 (10) | 29 Jan 1994 | Ingenio San Antonio Chichigalpa, Chinandega, Nicaragua | |
| 8 | Win | 8–0 | Mauricio Buitrago | TKO | 7 (10) | 27 Nov 1993 | Gimnasio Alexis Arguello, Managua, Nicaragua | |
| 7 | Win | 7–0 | Alcides Hernández | TKO | 3 (10) | 30 Oct 1993 | Gimnasio Alexis Arguello, Managua, Nicaragua | |
| 6 | Win | 6–0 | Lee Sandoval | UD | 10 | 26 Sep 1993 | Gimnasio Alexis Arguello, Managua, Nicaragua | |
| 5 | Win | 5–0 | Rudy Crawford | TKO | 2 (8) | 7 Aug 1993 | Gimnasio Alexis Arguello, Managua, Nicaragua | |
| 4 | Win | 4–0 | Lee Sandoval | UD | 8 | 15 May 1993 | Gimnasio Alexis Arguello, Managua, Nicaragua | |
| 3 | Win | 3–0 | Carlos López | KO | 5 (8) | 27 Feb 1993 | Gimnasio Alexis Arguello, Managua, Nicaragua | |
| 2 | Win | 2–0 | Gilbert García | UD | 6 | 5 Feb 1993 | Gimnasio Metropolitano, León, Nicaragua | |
| 1 | Win | 1–0 | Pablo Torres | TKO | 3 (10) | 12 Dec 1992 | Gimnasio Alexis Arguello, Managua, Nicaragua | |

== Titles in boxing ==
=== Major world titles ===
- WBA mini-flyweight champion (105 lbs)
- WBA light-flyweight champion (108 lbs)

=== The Ring magazine titles ===
- The Ring light-flyweight champion (108 lbs)

=== Regional/International titles ===
- WBA Fedelatin mini-flyweight champion (105 lbs)

== See also ==
- List of world mini-flyweight boxing champions
- List of world light-flyweight boxing champions

Sporting positions
World boxing titles
| Preceded by Chana Porpaoin | WBA mini-flyweight champion 2 December 1995 – 12 November 1998; Stripped | Vacant Title next held by Ricardo Lopez |
| Preceded by Beibis Mendoza | WBA light-flyweight champion 3 March 2001 – 1 October 2004; Stripped | Vacant Title next held by Roberto Vásquez |
| Inaugural champion | The Ring light flyweight champion 31 March 2003 – 1 October 2004; Stripped | Vacant Title next held by Hugo Cázares |
