= John Ruiz vs. Evander Holyfield III =

Boxing competition

- Date: December 15, 2001
- Venue: Foxwoods Resort in Mashantucket, Connecticut, U.S.
- Title(s) on the line: WBA heavyweight title

Tale of the tape
| Boxer | John Ruiz | Evander Holyfield |
| Nickname | The Quietman | The Real Deal |
| Hometown | Chelsea, Massachusetts, U.S. | Atlanta, Georgia, U.S. |
| Pre-fight record | 37–4 (27 KO) | 37–5–1 (25 KO) |
| Age | 29 years, 11 months | 39 years, 1 month |
| Height | 6 ft 2 in (188 cm) | 6 ft 2 1/2 in (189 cm) |
| Weight | 232 lb (105 kg) | 219 lb (99 kg) |
| Style | Orthodox | Orthodox |
| Recognition | WBA heavyweight champion | WBA; No. 2 Ranked Heavyweight; 2-division undisputed world champion |

Result
- Split draw (115-113 Ruiz, 114-114 draw, 116-112 Holyfield)

John Ruiz vs. Evander Holyfield III was a professional boxing match contested on December 15, 2001 for the WBA heavyweight championship. The fight ended in a split draw, a result that meant Ruiz retained his WBA title.

== Background ==
Holyfield won the WBA belt in August 2000, narrowly defeating Ruiz in controversial circumstances leading to the WBA mandating an immediate rematch. By the time the two met again in March 2001, promoter Don King had sold Holyfield's subsequent defence to Chinese company Great Wall Promotions. However, Ruiz upset the champion, flooring Holyfield in the 11th round on his way to a unanimous decision. King then announced that the trilogy would be concluded in Beijing in the summer.

The Chinese government, persuaded that staging a major sporting event before a massive global audience would enhance their bid for the 2008 Olympics, initially gave its backing to the proposal, on the understanding that the fight would take place in June.

With Ruiz unavailable for the June date, the bout was rescheduled for August 5. But by then Beijing had secured the Olympics and the enthusiasm of the Chinese government cooled. By late July both the Ruiz and Holyfield camps had arrived in Beijing but the "Brawl at the Wall" was abruptly "postponed" when Ruiz sustained a neck injury in training.

The fight was rescheduled for November 24 but that was before HBO withdrew its support citing new state department travel guidelines following the September 11 attacks, declined to send a 100 crew to a country bordering Afghanistan and pulled out of the deal

The Chinese pressed ahead with the fight despite difficulties in raising sponsorship money, and King could not even search for an alternative venue until mid-October, when the Chinese officially defaulted by failing to produce a letter of credit.

King finally secured Foxwoods and Ruiz agreed to take a $500,000 reduction in his scheduled $3.7m purse in return for a larger proportion of the live gate. Foxwoods, located less than two hours' drive from Ruiz's hometown, sold out the first day it put tickets on sale.

Holyfield was hoping to make history by capturing a heavyweight world title for a unprecedented fifth time.

== The fight ==
There were no knockdowns in the fight, but Holyfield was the aggressor and landed many more clean shots than the champion Ruiz. Judge Julie Lederman of New York scored it 116–112 for Holyfield, giving him the last five rounds. Judge Donald O'Neill of Florida also gave the last round to Holyfield, but scored it 115–113 for Ruiz, while Judge Tom Kaczmarek of New Jersey scored it 114–114, which enabled Ruiz to retain the title with a split decision draw. After the decision was announced, there was shock in Holyfield's corner, celebration in Ruiz's camp, and a lot of booing in the arena.

== Aftermath ==
Ruiz made a mandatory defense against Kirk Johnson before losing the title in unanimous decision defeat to Roy Jones Jr. in March 2003 almost exactly two years after he first won the title.

Holyfield then met the former WBC and IBF heavyweight champion Hasim Rahman in a WBA heavyweight title "eliminator" match with the winner to earn a shot at the WBA title. Holyfield picked up the victory by referee technical decision, but rather than face Ruiz for the WBA title for a fourth time, agreed to face Chris Byrd for the vacant IBF title but lost a lopsided unanimous decision.

== Undercard ==
Confirmed bouts:

| Winner | Loser | Weight division/title belt(s) disputed | Result |
|---|---|---|---|
| (United States) Tim Austin | (Thailand) Chaiya Pothang | IBF World bantamweight title | Unanimous Decision. |
Non-TV bouts
| (United States) Tommy Martin | (United States) Craig Tomlinson | Heavyweight (10 rounds) | 9th round KO. |
| (United Kingdom) Danny Williams | (United States) Shawn Robinson | Heavyweight (8 rounds) | 2nd round TKO. |
| (United States) Nate Jones | (United States) Drexie James | Heavyweight (8 rounds) | 4th round TKO. |
| (Puerto Rico) Alberto de Jesus Trinidad | (United States) Roger Glover | Lightweight (4 rounds) | Majority Decision. |

== Broadcasting ==
| Country | Broadcaster |
|---|---|
| Australia | Main Event |
| United States | HBO |

| Preceded by First Rematch | John Ruiz's bouts December 15, 2001 | Succeeded by vs. Kirk Johnson |
| Preceded by First Rematch | Evander Holyfield's bouts December 15, 2001 | Succeeded by vs. Hasim Rahman |
