= Tim Graham (sports journalist) =

American sports journalist

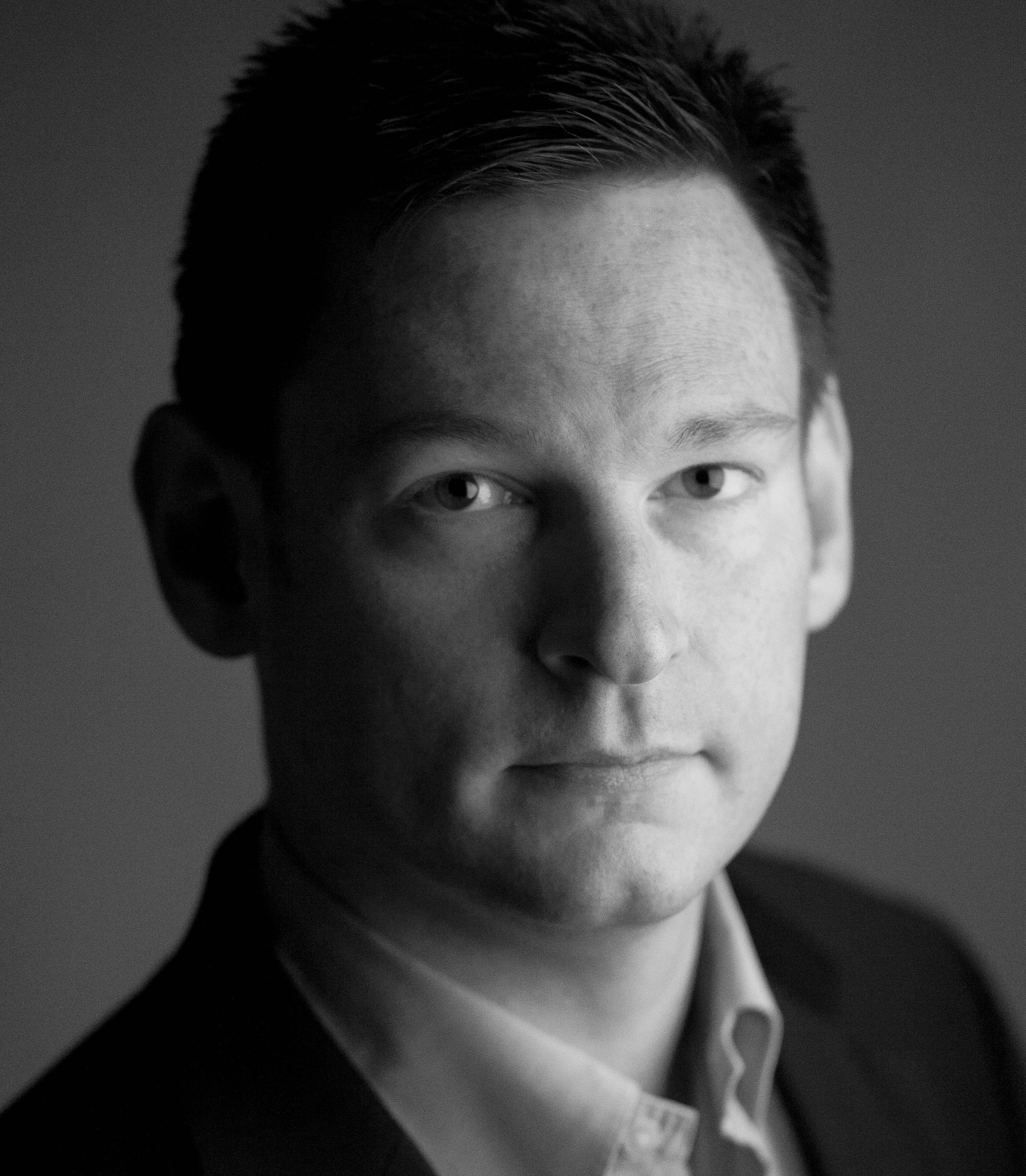

Tim Graham is a journalist who writes for The Athletic. He is a WIVB (CBS) NFL analyst, a host for WGR Radio in Buffalo and Rochester and an adjunct professor at Canisius University. His work has appeared in the Best American Sports Writing anthology series. Graham is known for his series of exclusive interviews with O.J. Simpson.

Graham had two stints at The Buffalo News, the second beginning as an enterprise reporter in 2011 and leading to three Pulitzer Prize nominations from the newspaper. He joined ESPN.com in 2008 after covering the Miami Dolphins for the Palm Beach Post. Graham previously spent eight years in the Buffalo News sports department, where he was an award-winning NHL and boxing writer. He served two terms as Boxing Writers Association of America president. Before moving to Buffalo, the Baldwin-Wallace University grad covered hockey, UNLV sports and sports broadcasting for the Las Vegas Sun. He also worked at the Boston Herald and the Morning Journal in Lorain, Ohio.

In 2018, he left The Buffalo News amid a wave of buyouts at the newspaper. Graham did not take a buyout, but chose to leave for The Athletic around that time.
