= Evander Holyfield vs. John Ruiz II =

Boxing competition

The Last Word
- Date: March 3, 2001
- Venue: Mandalay Bay Events Center, Paradise, Nevada, U.S.
- Title(s) on the line: WBA heavyweight title

Tale of the tape
Boxer	Evander Holyfield	John Ruiz
Nickname	The Real Deal	The Quietman
Hometown	Atlanta, Georgia, U.S.	Chelsea, Massachusetts, U.S.
Purse	$5,000,000	$1,500,000
Pre-fight record	37–4–1 (25 KO)	36–4 (27 KO)
Age	38 years, 4 months	29 years, 1 month
Height	6 ft 2 1/2 in (189 cm)	6 ft 2 in (188 cm)
Weight	217 lb (98 kg)	227 lb (103 kg)
Style	Orthodox	Orthodox
Recognition	WBA; Heavyweight Champion; The Ring; No. 4 Ranked Heavyweight; 2-division undisputed world champion	WBA; No. 1 Ranked Heavyweight

Result
- Ruiz wins via 12-round unanimous decision (114–111, 115–111, 116–110)

Evander Holyfield vs. John Ruiz II, billed as The Last Word, was a professional boxing match contested on March 3, 2001, for the WBA heavyweight championship.

== Background ==
After his controversial victory over Ruiz the previous August the WBA ordered new Heavyweight Champion Holyfield to make his first defence of his title a rematch against Ruiz.

Holyfield, a 2 to 1 favourite, admitted his performance in the first fight wasn't good enough saying "I was kind of embarrassed by that performance. Watching it later, I said 'I'm better than this."'.

== The fight ==
In the tenth round following several uneventful ones, Holyfield pressed Ruiz and scored a plethora of good hits; however, he halted his own momentum when he threw a low blow. The punch to the crotch caused Ruiz to double over, and he was given a few minutes to recover after a point was deducted from Holyfield. When the bout resumed, an apparently still angry Ruiz exchanged some blows with Holyfield before throwing his own low blows.

Going into the eleventh round, both boxers had bruising and swelling, but Ruiz seemed the more hurt of the two and had also been cut. The eleventh would prove the most eventful round as Ruiz, who had stuck to jabbing and clinching for most of the fight, came out strong and landed several power punches on Holyfield. Ruiz knocked the disoriented Holyfield down with a straight right halfway into the round. Holyfield beat the count to get up, but was weak in the legs and mostly clung to Ruiz for the remainder of the round (losing his own footing and going back to the canvas twice- both ruled slips rather than knockdowns). Ruiz continued to land power shots on the dazed Holyfield at will, additionally opening up a cut next to his left eye.

The twelfth round began with Ruiz dominating and connecting with nearly every jab he threw, Holyfield's defense clearly slipping. Holyfield went back on the offensive and both boxers landed power punches in between bouts of clinching and body punching, with Ruiz generally getting the better of the exchanges over the still shaky Holyfield. When the round ended, Ruiz returned to his corner with his hands raised in triumph while Holyfield returned to his corner while staring at his feet. Before the decision was announced, Ruiz embraced Holyfield, returned to his corner, and retrieved a Puerto Rican flag which he then waved in the center of the ring.

The judges saw Ruiz as the clear winner, with Stanley Christodoulou scoring it 116–110; Chuck Giampa, 115–111; and Patricia Jarman-Manning, 114–111, making him the first Latino boxer to have won a heavyweight world title.

== Aftermath ==
Despite the title of fight being the "Last Word" the two would fight again in December, with another controversial decision allowing Ruiz to retain the title with a draw.

The fight would underform with audiences, generating around 160,000 PPV buys.

== Undercard ==
Confirmed bouts:

Winner	Loser	Weight division/title belt(s) disputed	Result
(United States) Tim Austin	(Colombia) Jesús Salvador Pérez	IBF World bantamweight title	6th-round TKO.
(United States) Byron Mitchell	(Puerto Rico) Manny Siaca	vacant WBA World super middleweight title	12th-round TKO.
(United States) Manuel Gomez	(Mexico) Miguel Ángel González	Super Welterweight (10 rounds)	Split Decision.
(United States) Christy Martin	(United States) Jeanne Martinez	Welterweight (10 rounds)	Unanimous Decision.
(Nicaragua) Rosendo Álvarez	(Colombia) Beibis Mendoza	WBA World light flyweight title	12th round Split Decision.
Non-TV bouts
(Nigeria) Friday Ahunanya	(United States) Nate Jones	WBA-NABA heavyweight title	12th round Split Decision.
(United States) Tommy Martin	(United States) Harold Sconiers	Heavyweight (8 rounds)	Unanimous Decision.

== Broadcasting ==
Country	Broadcaster
Canada	CTV
United States	Showtime

Preceded by First Bout	Evander Holyfield' bouts March 3, 2001	Succeeded by Second Rematch
Preceded by First Bout	John Ruiz's bouts March 3, 2001	Succeeded by Second Rematch
