= Evander Holyfield =

American boxer (born 1962)

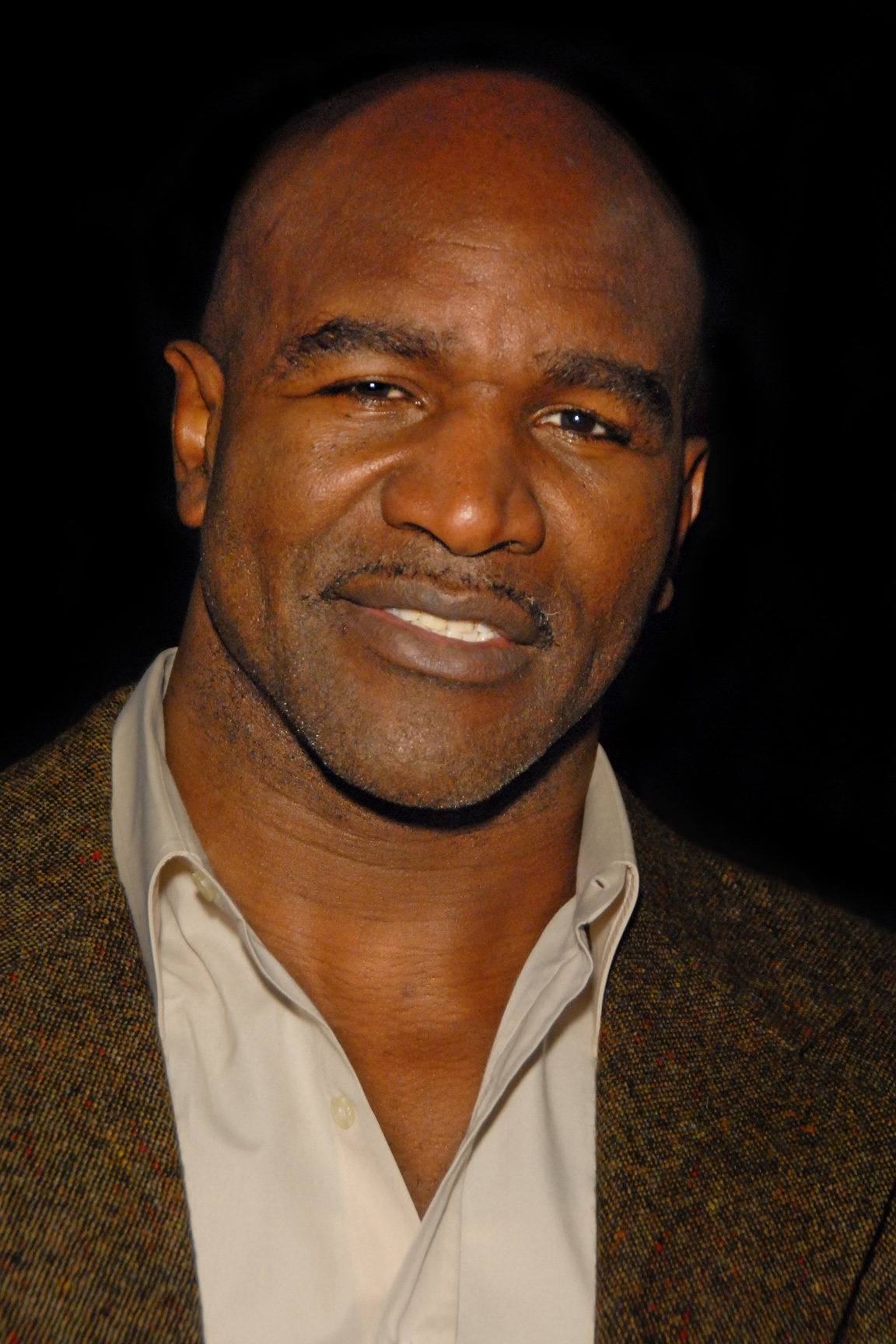
- Holyfield in 2011

Personal information
- Nicknames: The Real Deal; The Warrior
- Born: October 19, 1962 (age 64) Atmore, Alabama, U.S.
- Height: 6 ft 2 1/2 in (189 cm)
- Weight: Cruiserweight; Heavyweight
- Children: 11, including Elijah and Evan

Boxing career
- Reach: 77 1/2 in (197 cm)
- Stance: Orthodox

Boxing record
- Total fights: 57
- Wins: 44
- Win by KO: 29
- Losses: 10
- Draws: 2
- No contests: 1
Medal record
Men's amateur boxing
Representing United States
Olympic Games
Bronze medal – third place	1984 Los Angeles	Light heavyweight
Pan American Games
Silver medal – second place	1983 Caracas	Light heavyweight

Evander Holyfield (born October 19, 1962) is an American former professional boxer who competed between 1984 and 2011. He reigned as the undisputed champion (Note: Three-belt era: World Boxing Association (WBA), World Boxing Council (WBC), and International Boxing Federation (IBF) titles.) in the cruiserweight division in the late 1980s and at heavyweight in the early 1990s, and was the only boxer in history to win the undisputed championship in two weight classes in the "three-belt era", a feat later surpassed by Terence Crawford, Naoya Inoue and Oleksandr Usyk, who became two-weight undisputed champions in the four-belt era. Nicknamed "the Real Deal", Holyfield is the only four-time world heavyweight champion, having held the unified World Boxing Association (WBA), World Boxing Council (WBC), and International Boxing Federation (IBF) titles from 1990 to 1992, the WBA and IBF titles again from 1993 to 1994, the WBA title a third time from 1996 to 1999; the IBF title a third time from 1997 to 1999 and the WBA title for a fourth time from 2000 to 2001.

As an amateur, Holyfield represented the United States at the 1984 Summer Olympics, winning the light heavyweight bronze medal. He turned professional at the age of 21, moving up to cruiserweight in 1985 and winning his first world championship the following year, defeating Dwight Muhammad Qawi for the WBA title. Holyfield then went on to defeat Ricky Parkey and Carlos de León to win the WBC and IBF titles, thus becoming the undisputed cruiserweight champion. He moved up to heavyweight in 1988, later defeating Buster Douglas in 1990 to claim the unified WBA, WBC and IBF heavyweight titles and the undisputed heavyweight championship.

He successfully defended his titles three times, scoring victories over former champions George Foreman and Larry Holmes, before suffering his first professional loss to Riddick Bowe in 1992. Holyfield regained the crown in a rematch one year later, defeating Bowe for the WBA and IBF titles (Bowe having relinquished the WBC title beforehand). Holyfield later lost these titles in an upset against Michael Moorer in 1994.

Holyfield was forced to retire in 1994 upon medical advice, only to return a year later with a clean bill of health. In 1996, he defeated Mike Tyson and reclaimed the WBA title, in what was named by The Ring magazine as the Fight of the Year and Upset of the Year. This made Holyfield the first boxer since Muhammad Ali to win a world heavyweight title three times. Holyfield won a 1997 rematch against Tyson, which saw the latter disqualified in round three for biting off part of Holyfield's ears. During this reign as champion, he also avenged his loss to Michael Moorer and reclaimed the IBF title.

In 1999, he faced Lennox Lewis in a unification fight for the undisputed WBA, WBC, and IBF titles, which ended in a controversial split draw. Holyfield was defeated in a rematch eight months later. The following year, he defeated John Ruiz for the vacant WBA title, becoming the first boxer in history to win a version of the heavyweight title four times. Holyfield lost a rematch against Ruiz seven months later and faced him for the third time in a draw.

Holyfield retired in 2014, and is ranked number 77 on The Ring's list of 100 greatest punchers of all time and in 2002 named him the 22nd greatest fighter of the past 80 years. He currently ranks No.91 in BoxRec's ranking of the greatest pound for pound boxers of all time. BoxingScene ranked him the greatest cruiserweight of all time. He is also the first boxer to hold world titles in three decades, in the 1980s, 1990s and 2000s. In 2015, he was inducted into the International Sports Hall of Fame.

== Early life ==
Evander Holyfield was born on October 19, 1962, in the mill town of Atmore, Alabama. The youngest of nine children, he was much younger than his other siblings and was born from a different father. His family later moved to Atlanta, Georgia, where he was raised in the crime-ridden Bowen Homes Housing Projects.

Holyfield describes himself as a physical "late bloomer": upon graduating from Fulton High School in 1980, he was only 5 ft 8 in (1.73 m) tall and weighed only 147 pounds (67 kg). By age 21, he had grown to 6 ft 0 in (1.83 m) and weighed 178 pounds (81 kg). He grew an additional 2 1/2 inches (6.4 cm) in his early 20s, finally reaching his adult height of 6 ft 2 1/2 in (1.89 m).

== Amateur career ==
He began boxing at age seven and won the Boys Club boxing tournament. At 13, he qualified to compete in his first Junior Olympics. By age 15, Holyfield became the Southeastern Regional Champion, winning this tournament and the Best Boxer Award. By 1984 he had a record of 160 wins and 14 losses, with 76 by knockout.

When he was 20 years old, Holyfield represented the U.S. in the 1983 Pan American Games in Caracas, Venezuela, where he won a silver medal after losing to Cuban world champion Pablo Romero. The following year, he was the National Golden Gloves Champion, and won a bronze medal in the 1984 Summer Olympic Games in Los Angeles, California, after a controversial disqualification in the second round of the semi-final against New Zealand's Kevin Barry.

== Professional career ==
=== Light heavyweight ===
Holyfield started out professionally as a light heavyweight with a televised win in six rounds over Lionel Byarm at Madison Square Garden on November 15, 1984. On January 20, 1985, he won another six-round decision over Eric Winbush in Atlantic City, New Jersey. On March 13, he knocked out Fred Brown in the first round in Norfolk, Virginia, and on April 20, he knocked out Mark Rivera in two rounds in Corpus Christi, Texas.

=== Cruiserweight ===
Both he and his next opponent, Tyrone Booze, moved up to the cruiserweight division for their fight on July 20, 1985, in Norfolk, Virginia. Holyfield won an eight-round decision over Booze. He then went on to knock out Rick Myers in the first round on August 29 in his hometown of Atlanta. On October 30 in Atlantic City Holyfield knocked out opponent Jeff Meachem in five rounds, and his last fight for 1985 was against Anthony Davis on December 21 in Virginia Beach, Virginia. He won by knocking out Davis in the fourth round.

He began 1986 with a knockout in three rounds over former world cruiserweight challenger Chisanda Mutti, and proceeded to beat Jessy Shelby and Terry Mims before being given a world title try by the WBA Cruiserweight Champion Dwight Muhammad Qawi. In what was called by The Ring as the best cruiserweight bout of the 1980s, Holyfield became world champion by defeating Qawi by a narrow 15 round split decision. He culminated 1986 with a trip to Paris, France, where he beat Mike Brothers by a knockout in three, in a non-title bout.

In 1987, he defended his title against former Olympic teammate and Gold medal winner Henry Tillman, who had beaten Mike Tyson twice as an amateur. He retained his belt, winning by seventh-round knockout, and then went on to unify his WBA belt with the IBF belt held by Ricky Parkey, knocking Parkey out in three rounds. For his next bout, he returned to France, where he retained the title with an eleven-round knockout against former world champion Ossie Ocasio. In his last fight of 1987, he offered Muhammad Qawi a rematch and, this time, he beat Qawi by a knockout in only four rounds.

1988 was another productive year for Holyfield; he started by becoming the first universally recognized World Cruiserweight Champion after defeating the Lineal & WBC Champion Carlos De León at Las Vegas. The fight was stopped after eight rounds.

=== Heavyweight ===
After that fight, he announced he was moving up in weight to pursue the World Heavyweight Championship held by Tyson. His first fight as a Heavyweight took place on July 16, when he beat former Tyson rival James "Quick" Tillis by a knockout in five, in Lake Tahoe, Nevada (Tillis had gone the distance with Tyson). For his third and final bout of 1988, he beat former Heavyweight Champion Pinklon Thomas, also by knockout, in seven rounds.

Holyfield began 1989 meeting another former Heavyweight Champion, Michael Dokes. This fight was named one of the best fights of the 1980s by Ring magazine, as best heavyweight bout of the 1980s. Holyfield won by a knockout in the 10th round, and then he met Brazilian Champion Adilson Rodrigues, who lasted two rounds. His last fight of the 1980s was against Alex Stewart, a hard punching fringe contender. Stewart shocked Holyfield early, with quick, hard punches, but eventually fell in eight.

In 1990, Holyfield beat Seamus McDonagh, knocking him out in four rounds. By this time, Holyfield had been Ring Magazine's number-one contender for two years and had yet to receive a shot at Tyson's Heavyweight title.

=== Undisputed heavyweight champion ===
Holyfield had been promised a title shot against Tyson in 1990. Before that fight could occur, in what many consider to be the biggest upset in boxing history, relatively unknown boxer, 29-year-old, 231 lb. Buster Douglas defeated the 23-year-old, 218 lb. Mike Tyson in 10 rounds in Tokyo to become the new undisputed heavyweight champion. Instead of fighting Tyson, Holyfield was Douglas's first title defense.

They met on October 25, 1990. Douglas came into the fight at 246 lb. and offered little in the fight against Holyfield, who was in ideal shape at 208 lb. In the third round Douglas tried to start a combination with a big right uppercut. Holyfield countered with a straight right hand and Douglas went down for the count. Holyfield was the new undefeated, undisputed heavyweight champion of the World. At the time of the knockout, Holyfield was ahead on all three judges' scorecards, all seeing it 20–18 for Holyfield.

In his first defense, he beat former and future world champion George Foreman by unanimous decision. The fight was billed as a "Battle for the Ages", a reference to the age difference between the young undefeated champion (28 years old) and the much older George Foreman (42 years old). Holyfield weighed in at 208 pounds and Foreman weighed in at 257 pounds. Foreman lost the fight by a unanimous decision, but surprised many by lasting the whole 12 rounds against a much younger opponent, even staggering Holyfield a few times and knocking him off balance in the seventh round.

Then a deal was signed for him to defend his crown against Mike Tyson in November 1991. Tyson delayed the fight, claiming he was injured in training, but was then convicted for the rape of Desiree Washington and sentenced to six years in prison, so the fight did not happen at that time. They fought in 1996 (Holyfield won by a TKO in 11) and a rematch in 1997 (Holyfield won by disqualification in three, after Tyson bit both of his ears).

Holyfield made his next defense in Atlanta against late replacement in Bert Cooper over Francesco Damiani who suffered a foot injury in training days before the fight, Cooper surprised Holyfield with a very good effort. Holyfield scored the first knockdown of the fight against Cooper with a powerful shot to the body, but Cooper returned the favor with a good right hand that sent Holyfield against the ropes; while not an actual knockdown, referee Mills Lane gave Holyfield a standing eight-count. Having suffered the first technical knockdown of his professional career, Holyfield regained his composure quickly and administered a beating that left Cooper still on his feet, but unable to defend himself. Holyfield landed brutal power shots, culminated by repeated vicious uppercuts that snapped Cooper's head back. Referee Mills Lane stopped the bout in the seventh.

In his first fight of 1992, he faced 42 year old former world heavyweight champion Larry Holmes, and had just pulled off an upset against Ray Mercer. During the bout, Holyfield suffered the first scar of his career with a gash opening up over his eye, the result of Holmes' elbow. The fight ended with a unanimous decision in favor of Holyfield.

=== Holyfield–Bowe rivalry ===
In the beginning of a trilogy of bouts with the 25-year-old Riddick Bowe, who had won a silver medal in the 1988 Olympics, in the super heavyweight division, he suffered his first defeat when Bowe won the undisputed title by a 12-round unanimous decision in Las Vegas. Round ten of that bout was named the "Round of the Year" by The Ring. Holyfield was knocked down in round 11. He made the mistake of getting into a slugfest with the younger, bigger and stronger Bowe, leading to his defeat.

He began 1993 by beating Alex Stewart in a rematch, but this time over the 12-round unanimous distance.

Then came the rematch with Bowe on November 6, 1993. In what is considered by many sporting historians as one of the most bizarre moments in boxing's history, during round seven the crowd got off their feet and many people started to run for cover and yell. Holyfield took his eyes off Bowe for one moment and then told Bowe to look up to the skies. What they saw was a man in a parachute flying dangerously close to them. The man almost entered the ring, but his parachute had gotten entangled in the lights and he landed on the ropes and apron of the ring, and he was then pulled into the crowd, where he was beaten by members of Bowe's entourage. Bowe's pregnant wife, Judy, fainted and had to be taken to the hospital from the arena. Twenty minutes later, calm was restored and Holyfield went on to recover his world heavyweight titles with a close 12 round majority decision. The man who parachuted down to the middle of the ring became known as The Fan Man and the fight itself became known as the Fan Man Fight. His victory over Bowe that year helped Holyfield being named as ABC's Wide World of Sports Athlete of the Year for 1993.

=== Holyfield vs. Moorer, Holyfield vs. Bowe III ===
His next fight, April 1994, he met former WBO light heavyweight Michael Moorer, who was attempting to become the first southpaw to become the universally recognised world heavyweight champion. He dropped Moorer in round two, but lost a twelve-round majority decision. When he went to the hospital to have his shoulder checked, he was diagnosed with a heart condition and had to announce his retirement from boxing. It later surfaced that the chairman of the medical advisory board for the Nevada Athletic Commission believed his condition to be consistent with HGH use.

However, watching a television show hosted by preacher Benny Hinn, Holyfield says he felt his heart heal. He and Hinn subsequently became friends and he became a frequent visitor to Hinn's crusades. In fact, during this time, Holyfield went to a Benny Hinn crusade in Philadelphia, had Hinn lay hands on him and gave Hinn a check for $265,000 after he was told he was healed. He then passed his next examination by the boxing commission. Holyfield later stated that his heart was misdiagnosed due to the morphine pumped into his body.

In 1995, Holyfield returned to the ring with a ten-round decision win versus former Olympic gold medalist, Ray Mercer. He was the first man to knock down Mercer.

Holyfield and Bowe then had their rubber match. Holyfield knocked Bowe down with a single left hook but Bowe prevailed by a knockout in eight. Holyfield later claimed that he contracted hepatitis before the fight.

=== Holyfield–Tyson rivalry ===
==== Holyfield vs. Tyson ====
In 1996, Holyfield met former world champion Bobby Czyz, beating him by a knockout in six. Afterwards, he and Mike Tyson met.

Tyson had recovered the WBC and WBA Heavyweight Championship and, after being stripped of the WBC title for not facing Lennox Lewis, defended the WBA title against Holyfield on November 9 of that year. Tyson was heavily favored to win, but Holyfield made history by defeating Tyson in an 11th round TKO. This was the third occasion on which Holyfield won the WBA Heavyweight title. However, the fight was not recognized as being for the lineal championship, which was held by George Foreman at the time.

==== Holyfield vs. Tyson II: The Bite Fight ====
Holyfield's rematch with Tyson took place on June 28, 1997. Known as "The Bite Fight", it went into the annals of boxing as one of the most bizarre fights in history. The infamous incident occurred in the third round, when Tyson bit Holyfield on one of his ears and had two points deducted. Referee Mills Lane decided to disqualify Tyson initially, but after Holyfield and the ringside doctor intervened and said Holyfield could continue, he relented and allowed the fight to go on. Tyson bit Holyfield again, this time on the other ear. Tyson's teeth tore off a small section of the top of his opponent's ear, known as the helix, and spat that bit of flesh out onto the canvas.

The immediate aftermath of the incident was bedlam. Tyson was disqualified and a melee ensued. Tyson claimed his bites were a retaliation to Holyfield's unchecked headbutts, which had cut him in both fights. Others argued that Tyson, knowing he was on his way to another knockout loss, was looking for a way out of the fight. Teddy Atlas, who had briefly trained Tyson seventeen years earlier, predicted that Tyson would get himself disqualified, calling Tyson "a very weak and flawed person".

=== Holyfield vs. Moorer II, Bean ===
Next came another rematch, this time against Michael Moorer, who had recovered the IBF's world title. Holyfield knocked Moorer to the canvas five times and referee Mitch Halpern stopped the fight between the eighth and ninth rounds under the advice of physician Flip Homansky. Holyfield once again unified his WBA belt with the IBF belt by avenging his defeat by Moorer. In doing so, Holyfield became the only man to win the unified heavyweight championship on three occasions.

In 1998 Holyfield had only one fight, making a mandatory defense against Vaughn Bean, who was defeated by decision at the Georgia Dome in the champion's hometown. For the first time, Holyfield's performance called into question whether age was diminishing his ability to continue as a championship fighter.

=== Holyfield–Lewis rivalry ===
==== Holyfield vs. Lewis ====
By 1999, the public was clamoring for a unification bout versus the WBC World Champion, Lennox Lewis of the United Kingdom. That bout happened in March of that year. The bout was declared a controversial draw after twelve rounds, where it appeared to most that Lewis dominated the fight. Holyfield claimed his performance was hindered by stomach and leg cramps. Holyfield and Lewis were ordered by the three leading organizations of which they were champions to have an immediate rematch.

==== Holyfield vs. Lewis II ====
The second time around in November of that year, Lewis became the Undisputed Champion by beating Holyfield by a unanimous decision which, while less controversial than the result of their first bout, was also disputed amongst media and observers. "I haven't felt this good after a fight since I was a cruiserweight," Holyfield said; "It makes me think I should have fought a little harder against Lennox. Maybe I'd be sore and sick, but I'd have the victory."

=== Holyfield–John Ruiz trilogy ===
In 2000, Lewis was stripped of the WBA belt for failing to meet lightly regarded Don King fighter John Ruiz, having fought Ruiz's conqueror David Tua, and the WBA ordered Holyfield and Ruiz to meet for that organization's world title belt. Holyfield and Ruiz began their trilogy in August of that year, with Holyfield making history by winning on a controversial, but unanimous 12-round decision to become the first boxer in history to be the World Heavyweight Champion four times. Holyfield blamed his lackluster performance on a perforated (broken) eardrum.

Seven months later, in March 2001, it was Ruiz's turn to make history at Holyfield's expense when he surprisingly managed to knock Holyfield down and beat him by a 12-round decision to become the first Hispanic ever to win a Heavyweight title. On December 15 of that year, Holyfield challenged Ruiz for the title, in an attempt to become champion again. The fight was declared a draw and John Ruiz maintained the WBA Championship title.

=== Holyfield vs. Byrd ===
2002 began as a promising year for Holyfield: in June, he met former World Heavyweight Champion Hasim Rahman, to determine who would face Lewis next. Holyfield was leading on two of the three scorecards when the fight was stopped in the eighth round due to a severe hematoma on Rahman's forehead above his left eye that was caused by a headbutt earlier in the fight. Holyfield was ahead, so he was declared the winner by a technical decision.

The IBF decided to strip Lewis of his belt after he didn't want to fight Don King-promoted fighter Chris Byrd, instead going after Tyson, and declared that the winner of the fight between Holyfield and former WBO Heavyweight Champion Byrd would be recognized as their Heavyweight Champion. On December 14, 2002, Holyfield once again tried to become the first man ever to be Heavyweight Champion five times when he and Byrd met, but Byrd came out as the winner by a 12-round unanimous decision.

=== Consecutive losses, New York suspension ===
On October 4, 2003, Holyfield lost to James Toney by TKO when his corner threw in the towel in the ninth round. At age 42, Holyfield returned to the ring to face Larry Donald on November 13, 2004. He lost his third consecutive match in a twelve-round unanimous decision.

In August 2005 it had been reported that the New York State Athletic Commission had banned Evander Holyfield from boxing in New York due to "diminishing skills" despite the fact that Holyfield had passed a battery of medical tests.

=== Comeback ===
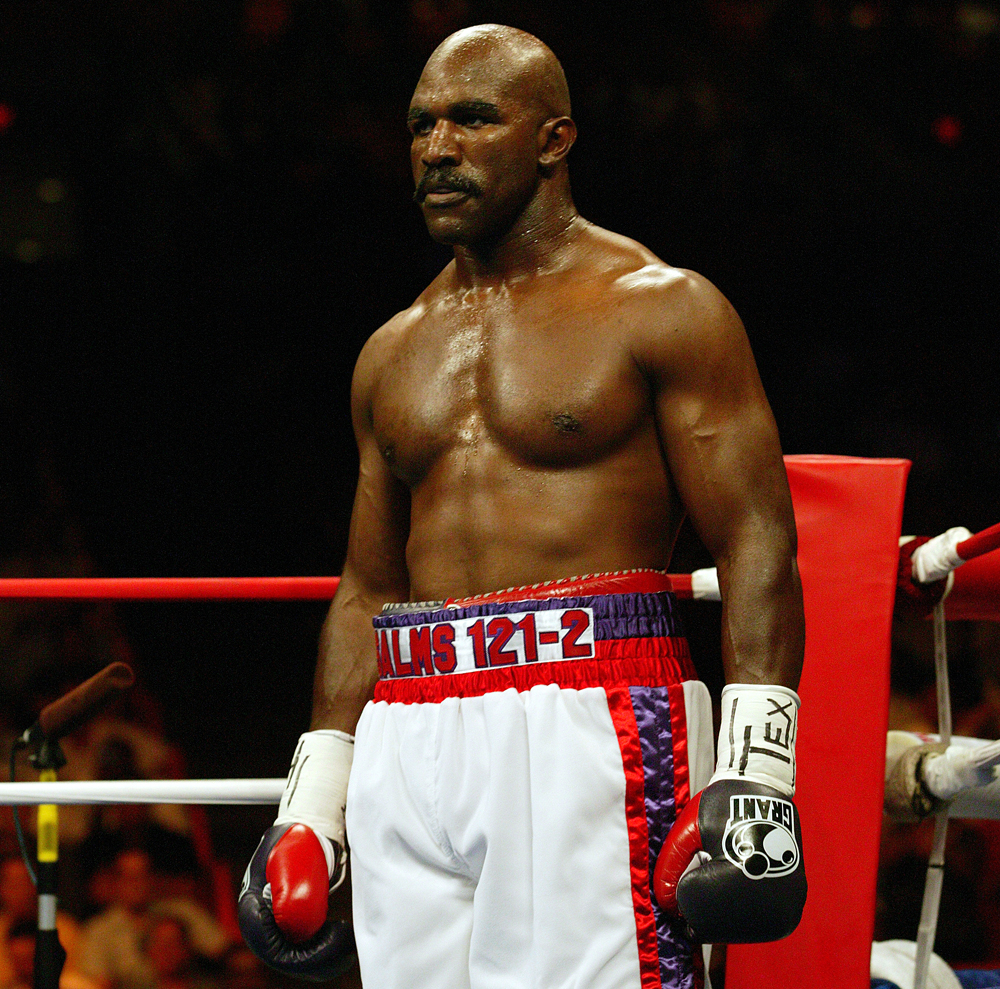
Holyfield vs. Savarese, 2007

Holyfield was initially criticized for his ongoing comeback; but he was adamant that his losses to Toney and Donald were the result of a shoulder injury, not of old age. Holyfield had looked better in his first four fights since Donald and appeared to have answered the critics who say that he lacked the cutting edge and ability to follow up on crucial openings that he had in his youth.

Holyfield defeated Jeremy Bates by TKO on August 18, 2006, in a 10-round bout at American Airlines Center in Dallas, Texas. Holyfield dominated the fight which was stopped in the second round after he landed roughly twenty consecutive punches on Bates.

Holyfield defeated Fres Oquendo by unanimous decision on November 10, 2006, in San Antonio, Texas. Holyfield knocked Oquendo down in the first minute of the first round and continued to be the aggressor throughout the fight, winning a unanimous decision by scores of 116–111 and 114–113 twice.

On March 17, 2007, Holyfield defeated Vinny Maddalone by TKO when Maddalone's corner threw in the towel to save their man from serious injury in the ring.

On June 30, 2007, Holyfield defeated Lou Savarese, knocking the bigger and heavier Savarese down in the fourth and again in the ninth round, en route to a unanimous decision win. This was Holyfield's fourth win in ten months, two of them by KO. This victory finally set the stage for Holyfield's title fight against Sultan Ibragimov, for the WBO Heavyweight title.

==== Holyfield vs. Ibragimov ====
On October 13, 2007, Holyfield was defeated by Sultan Ibragimov. Although unable to defy his critics by winning a fifth Heavyweight title, Holyfield refused to be backed up by the young champion and even rattled him in the closing part of the 12th round. The fight was mostly uneventful, however, with neither fighter being truly staggered or knocked down. In most exchanges, Sultan was able to land two punches to Holyfield's one. The result was a unanimous decision for Ibragimov, with scores of 118–110 and 117–111 twice.

==== Holyfield vs. Valuev ====
He told BBC Scotland's Sports Weekly "I'm gonna fight, be the heavyweight champion of the world one more time. Then I'm gonna write another book and tell everybody how I did it." On December 20, 2008, he fought, at the Hallenstadion in Zürich, Switzerland, the WBA Heavyweight Champion Nikolai Valuev for a paycheck of $600,000, the lowest amount he has ever received for a championship fight. At the weigh-in, he weighed 214 pounds, Valuev weighed a career low of 310 pounds.

Valuev defeated Holyfield by a highly controversial majority decision after a relatively uneventful bout. One judge scored the bout a draw 114–114, while the others had Valuev winning 116–112 and 115–114. Many analysts were outraged at the decision, thinking Holyfield had clearly won. There was talk of a rematch in 2009.

The WBA did their own investigation into the controversial decision; "As the World Boxing Association (WBA) always cares about and respects the fans' and the media's opinion, the Championship Committee has ordered a panel of judges to review the tape of the fight between Nikolai Valuev and Evander Holyfield, for the WBA heavyweight title" read a statement from the WBA. The organization also expressed that they "will give a decision accordingly in the following weeks." Many speculated that an immediate rematch would be the most likely scenario, but this never materialised. Valuev lost the WBA title in his next fight against British boxer David Haye.

=== Holyfield vs. Botha ===
After the loss to Valuev, Holyfield took a period of inactivity. He reportedly agreed to fight South African boxer Francois Botha on January 16, 2010; it was agreed that the venue for the fight would be the Nelson Mandela Memorial Stadium in Kampala, Uganda. A few weeks before the fight, it was revealed that the bout would be postponed to February 20, 2010. The match was put in jeopardy due to economic disagreements but was later confirmed to be on April 10, 2010, at the Thomas & Mack Center in Las Vegas. When asked about his upcoming bout, the four-time world heavyweight champion said: "I've been hearing for a while that I can't do it. All it does is light a fire under me to prove people wrong." He added: "I can still fight. I don't want to leave until I've become the undisputed heavyweight champion one more time. That's been my goal the entire time." The American boxer scored an eighth-round knockout of Botha to win the vacant World Boxing Federation (WBF) Heavyweight title.

Holyfield started slowly as usual in the early going. Botha held and hit Holyfield, and took the control of the fight for the first three rounds. However, the South African could not slow down Holyfield, though he did hurt him, and the American boxer slowly began to punch him more to take control of the bout in the later rounds. In the seventh round Holyfield stunned Botha and knocked him down in the eighth round. Though he beat the count, Holyfield cornered him and landed many punches that forced the referee Russell Mora to stop the bout. At the time of the stoppage, Holyfield was behind on two judges' cards, 67–66, while the third judge had it 69–64 for the American boxer. Only 3,127 attended the fight.

=== Holyfield vs. Williams ===
After the Botha fight, Holyfield said he was interested in fighting either Vitali Klitschko, the current WBC champion, or his younger brother Wladimir Klitschko. Holyfield's next bout against Sherman "The Tank" Williams on November 5, 2010, at Joe Louis Arena in Detroit, Michigan, was then postponed twice before finally being rescheduled to January 22, 2011, and moved to The Greenbrier in White Sulphur Springs, West Virginia. Holyfield started the bout slowly and in the second round, he was cut in the left eye following an accidental clash of heads. In round three as he took several combinations. After the end of the round, Holyfield told his corner that he was unable to see due to the cut. Consequently, the bout was ruled a no contest.

The WBC had allegedly agreed to match Holyfield up with Vitali Klitschko after fights with Williams and Nielsen.

=== Holyfield vs. Nielsen ===
A fight with Brian Nielsen, the most popular Danish heavyweight in that country's history, was scheduled for March 5, 2011, in Denmark, but needed to be postponed to May 7, 2011, due to a cut Holyfield received in the Williams fight.

The official weigh-in was held on Friday night in Denmark, with Holyfield at 225 pounds, while his opponent Nielsen, with his shorts on, weighed 238 pounds. Nielsen had never been this light in his career. Nielsen had said that although it would be mighty difficult for him to beat Holyfield, he promised it would not be a one-sided affair. Holyfield said that if he won he would move to next level and challenge for major titles.

Holyfield started the fight aggressively, pressing the 46-year-old Nielsen into the ropes and landing several hard jabs and hooks, knocking him down in the 3rd round. Despite getting a swollen eye in the 4th round, Nielsen kept on clowning to provoke Holyfield throughout the bout, prompting his trainer, Paul Duvill, to beg him to stop fooling around and focus on Holyfield. In round 10, Nielsen pushed a tired-looking Holyfield into the ropes with a series of combinations, before Holyfield turned it around. Holyfield pushed Nielsen into a corner and battered him with combinations until the referee stopped the contest.

=== Retirement ===
After the Nielsen fight, Holyfield attempted to land a shot at a world heavyweight title (all major belts were held by Wladimir and Vitali Klitschko, at that time). However, after more than a year of trying to land this fight, Yahoo News reported his intention to retire in 2012, with Holyfield stating, "The game's been good to me and I hope I've been good to the game. ... I'm 50 years old (on Friday) and I've pretty much did everything that I wanted to do in boxing." Later that same month, however, Holyfield seemed to change his mind, saying that he still considers himself a "serious contender." Unable to secure a title shot, his career went into limbo for several months. However, In June 2014, after not fighting in over three years, Holyfield announced his final retirement. He is currently a boxing adviser to heavyweight prospect Zhang Zhilei.

== Exhibition bouts ==
In 2015, Evander Holyfield and Mitt Romney participated in a friendly exhibition bout for charity; the event took place in Utah to help the organization CharityVision.

=== Holyfield vs. Belfort ===
On April 16, 2021, it was announced that Holyfield would return to the ring on June 5, 2021, to face Kevin McBride (most widely known for defeating former undisputed heavyweight champion Mike Tyson) in an exhibition bout on the undercard of Teófimo López vs. George Kambosos Jr. However, after the López vs. Kambosos card was postponed multiple times, the fight against McBride ultimately did not materialize, leading Holyfield to file a demand for arbitration against Triller.

On September 3, 2021, it was reported that Oscar De La Hoya, who had been slated to headline a Triller PPV show against Vitor Belfort on September 11, had been hospitalized with COVID-19, and that Holyfield would be stepping in for De La Hoya. The event was originally scheduled to take place in California, however, the California State Athletic Commission refused to sanction a bout with Holyfield in any capacity–exhibition or professional. The bout was subsequently moved to Florida after the Florida State Athletic Commission agreed to sanction the bout as an exhibition. Holyfield lost via first-round technical knockout.

== Personal life ==
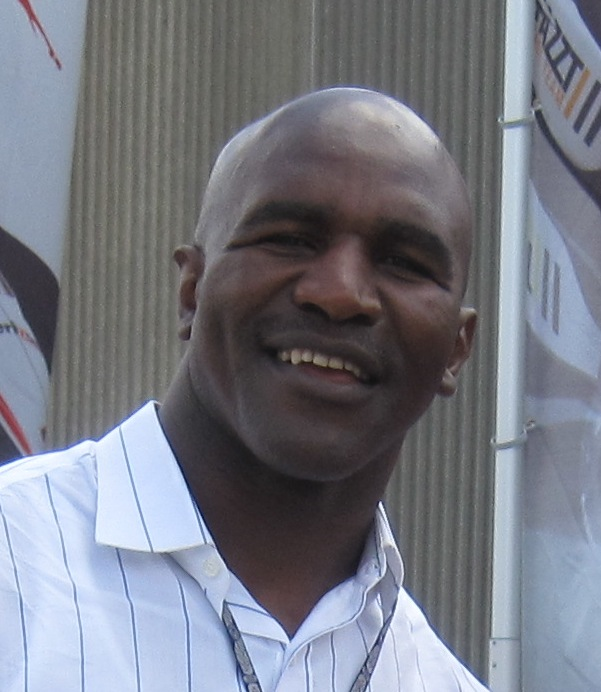
Holyfield at the Indianapolis Motor Speedway in 2010

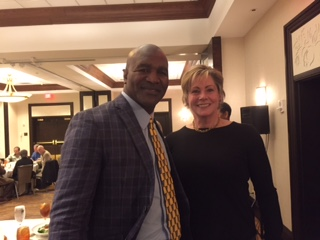
Holyfield with Olympic weightlifting champion Karyn Marshall at a ceremony honoring him in 2016

Holyfield is the younger brother of actor and dancer, Bernard Holyfield, and currently lives and trains in Fayette County, Georgia.

One of his sons, Evan, followed in his father's footsteps and became a professional boxer. Another son, Elijah, played football for the Cincinnati Bengals.

He is a born-again Christian.

He founded Real Deal Records which signed the briefly successful group Exhale.

In late 2007 and early 2008, Holyfield was among a number of celebrities to be doing television ads for the restaurant chain Zaxby's.

In 2017, a statue of Evander Holyfield designed by sculptor Brian Hanlon was commissioned by the city of Atlanta for installation in Downtown Atlanta.

=== Advertising ===
By 1992, Holyfield was already a household name, endorsing multiple products on television, such as Coca-Cola and Diet Coke. He also had a video game released for the Genesis and Game Gear: Evander Holyfield's Real Deal Boxing.

In 1996 Holyfield was given the opportunity to carry the Olympic torch when it was on its way to his hometown of Atlanta for that year's Olympics.

On September 22, 2007, Holyfield released the Real Deal Grill cooking appliance via TV infomercials. The Real Deal Grill is manufactured by Cirtran Corp.

=== Celebrity appearances ===
Holyfield's popularity has led to numerous television appearances for the boxer. His first television show appearance was the Christmas special of The Fresh Prince of Bel-Air in 1990, playing himself. Other television appearances over the years included Home Improvement, Living Single, New York Undercover, and NCIS: Los Angeles.

Holyfield had minor roles in three movies during the 1990s, Blood Salvage (1990, which he also produced), Necessary Roughness (1991), and Summer of Sam (1999). He made a guest appearance on Nickelodeon's game show Nickelodeon Guts during its third season in 1994.

He appeared once in an episode of children animated series Phineas and Ferb. In the episode, he is an animated character but the producers wanted to make the most of Holyfield's ear, so his animated character was only given half an ear.

In 2005, Holyfield came in fifth place on ABC's Dancing with the Stars with his partner Edyta Sliwinska. He also made an appearance on the original BBC Strictly Come Dancing "Champion of Champions" showdown, which featured the final four teams from the 2005 edition of the British series, plus two celebrities from spinoff versions, paired with British professional dancers, one featuring Holyfield paired with Karen Hardy, and Rachel Hunter paired with Brendan Cole.

On August 13, 2007, Holyfield was confirmed to participate in a boxing match at World Wrestling Entertainment's Saturday Night's Main Event XXXV against Matt Hardy. He replaced Montel Vontavious Porter, who had to pull out after being legitimately diagnosed with a heart condition that was not part of a storyline.

Holyfield appeared as himself in the 2011 remake of Arthur.

On January 3, 2014, Holyfield became the 12th housemate to enter the 13th series of Celebrity Big Brother (UK). On January 6, 2014, he was reprimanded by the show after saying in a conversation with another housemate that gayness is abnormal and can be fixed. On January 10, 2014, he became the first housemate to be evicted.

In May 2016, Holyfield entered the Argentine dancing reality show Bailando 2016.

In 2019, Holyfield appeared as part of the Carolina Hurricanes NHL team's "Storm Surge" celebration, in which he pretended to knock out Hurricanes player Jordan Martinook at center ice. Recordings of Holyfield supporting the Hurricanes occasionally appeared on the team's scoreboard for the remainder of that season and in subsequent years.

=== Financial difficulties ===
In June 2008 a legal notice was placed by Washington Mutual Bank stating that Holyfield's $10 million, 54,000-square-foot (5,000 m^{2}), 109-room, 17-bathroom suburban Atlanta estate would be auctioned off on July 1, 2008, due to foreclosure, shortly before that bank's insolvency. Rapper Rick Ross ended up acquiring the house. Adding to his financial problems, Toi Irvin, mother of his then 10-year-old son, filed suit for non-payment of two months child support (he was paying $3,000 per month for this child). A Utah landscaping firm also went to court seeking $550,000 in unpaid debt for services. His fortune was drained by frivolous spending, multiple failed business ventures, constant child support payments, and his three divorces, among other things.

In 2012 The Independent described Holyfield as "flat broke and bankrupt" despite having earned £350 million (US$513 million) over his boxing career.

As of 2019, Holyfield was earning about $1.2 million a year, mostly through personal appearances.

=== Allegations of steroid and HGH use ===
On February 28, 2007, Holyfield was anonymously linked to Applied Pharmacy Services, a pharmacy in Alabama that was under investigation for supplying athletes with illegal steroids and human growth hormone (HGH). He denied ever using performance enhancers.

Holyfield's name does not appear in the law enforcement documents reviewed. However, a patient by the name of "Evan Fields" caught investigators' attention. "Fields" shares the same birth date as Holyfield, October 19, 1962. The listed address for "Fields" was 794 Evander, Fairfield, Ga. 30213. Holyfield has a very similar address. When the phone number that, according to the documents, was associated with the "Fields" prescription, was dialed, Holyfield answered.

On March 10, 2007, Holyfield made a public announcement that he would be pursuing his own investigation into the steroid claims in order to clear his name.

Holyfield was again linked to HGH in September 2007, when his name came up following a raid of Signature Pharmacy in Orlando, Florida. Signature Pharmacy was under investigation for illegally supplying several professional athletes with steroids and HGH.

== Professional boxing record ==
57 fights	44 wins	10 losses
By knockout	29	2
By decision	14	8
By disqualification	1	0
Draws	2	
No contests	1	

No.	Result	Record	Opponent	Type	Round, time	Date	Age	Location	Notes
57	Win	44–10–2 (1)	Brian Nielsen	TKO	10 (12), 2:49	May 7, 2011	48 years, 200 days	Koncerthuset, Copenhagen, Denmark	
56	NC	43–10–2 (1)	Sherman Williams	NC	3 (12), 3:00	Jan 22, 2011	48 years, 95 days	The Greenbrier, White Sulphur Springs, West Virginia, U.S.	WBF (Federation) heavyweight title at stake; Holyfield cut from an accidental head clash
55	Win	43–10–2	Francois Botha	TKO	8 (12), 0:55	Apr 10, 2010	47 years, 173 days	Thomas & Mack Center, Paradise, Nevada, U.S.	Won vacant WBF (Federation) heavyweight title
54	Loss	42–10–2	Nikolai Valuev	MD	12	Dec 20, 2008	46 years, 62 days	Hallenstadion, Zürich, Switzerland	For WBA heavyweight title
53	Loss	42–9–2	Sultan Ibragimov	UD	12	Oct 13, 2007	44 years, 359 days	Khodynka Arena, Moscow, Russia	For WBO heavyweight title
52	Win	42–8–2	Lou Savarese	UD	10	Jun 30, 2007	44 years, 254 days	Don Haskins Center, El Paso, Texas, U.S.	
51	Win	41–8–2	Vinny Maddalone	TKO	3 (10), 2:48	Mar 17, 2007	44 years, 149 days	American Bank Center, Corpus Christi, Texas, U.S.	
50	Win	40–8–2	Fres Oquendo	UD	12	Nov 10, 2006	44 years, 22 days	Alamodome, San Antonio, Texas, U.S.	Won vacant USBA heavyweight title
49	Win	39–8–2	Jeremy Bates	TKO	2 (12), 2:56	Aug 18, 2006	43 years, 303 days	American Airlines Center, Dallas, Texas, U.S.	
48	Loss	38–8–2	Larry Donald	UD	12	Nov 13, 2004	42 years, 25 days	Madison Square Garden, New York City, New York, U.S.	For vacant NABC heavyweight title
47	Loss	38–7–2	James Toney	TKO	9 (12), 1:42	Oct 4, 2003	40 years, 350 days	Mandalay Bay Events Center, Paradise, Nevada, U.S.	
46	Loss	38–6–2	Chris Byrd	UD	12	Dec 14, 2002	40 years, 56 days	Boardwalk Hall, Atlantic City, New Jersey, U.S.	For vacant IBF heavyweight title
45	Win	38–5–2	Hasim Rahman	TD	8 (12), 1:40	Jun 1, 2002	39 years, 225 days	Boardwalk Hall, Atlantic City, New Jersey, U.S.	Split TD: Rahman sustained eye swelling from an accidental head clash
44	Draw	37–5–2	John Ruiz	SD	12	Dec 15, 2001	39 years, 57 days	Foxwoods Resort Casino, Ledyard, Connecticut, U.S.	For WBA heavyweight title
43	Loss	37–5–1	John Ruiz	UD	12	Mar 3, 2001	38 years, 135 days	Mandalay Bay Events Center, Paradise, Nevada, U.S.	Lost WBA heavyweight title
42	Win	37–4–1	John Ruiz	UD	12	Aug 12, 2000	37 years, 298 days	Paris Las Vegas, Paradise, Nevada, U.S.	Won vacant WBA heavyweight title
41	Loss	36–4–1	Lennox Lewis	UD	12	Nov 13, 1999	37 years, 25 days	Thomas & Mack Center, Paradise, Nevada, U.S.	Lost WBA and IBF heavyweight titles; For WBC and vacant IBO heavyweight titles
40	Draw	36–3–1	Lennox Lewis	SD	12	Mar 13, 1999	36 years, 145 days	Madison Square Garden, New York City, New York, U.S.	Retained WBA and IBF heavyweight titles; For WBC heavyweight title
39	Win	36–3	Vaughn Bean	UD	12	Sep 19, 1998	35 years, 335 days	Georgia Dome, Atlanta, Georgia, U.S.	Retained WBA and IBF heavyweight titles
38	Win	35–3	Michael Moorer	RTD	8 (12), 3:00	Nov 8, 1997	35 years, 20 days	Thomas & Mack Center, Paradise, Nevada, U.S.	Retained WBA heavyweight title; Won IBF heavyweight title
37	Win	34–3	Mike Tyson	DQ	3 (12), 3:00	Jun 28, 1997	34 years, 252 days	MGM Grand Garden Arena, Paradise, Nevada, U.S.	Retained WBA heavyweight title; Tyson disqualified for biting
36	Win	33–3	Mike Tyson	TKO	11 (12), 0:37	Nov 9, 1996	34 years, 21 days	MGM Grand Garden Arena, Paradise, Nevada, U.S.	Won WBA heavyweight title
35	Win	32–3	Bobby Czyz	RTD	5 (10), 3:00	May 10, 1996	33 years, 204 days	Madison Square Garden, New York City, New York, U.S.	
34	Loss	31–3	Riddick Bowe	TKO	8 (12), 0:58	Nov 4, 1995	33 years, 16 days	Caesars Palace, Paradise, Nevada, U.S.	
33	Win	31–2	Ray Mercer	UD	10	May 20, 1995	32 years, 213 days	Convention Hall, Atlantic City, New Jersey, U.S.	
32	Loss	30–2	Michael Moorer	MD	12	Apr 22, 1994	31 years, 185 days	Caesars Palace, Paradise, Nevada, U.S.	Lost WBA and IBF heavyweight titles
31	Win	30–1	Riddick Bowe	MD	12	Nov 6, 1993	31 years, 18 days	Caesars Palace, Paradise, Nevada, U.S.	Won WBA and IBF heavyweight titles
30	Win	29–1	Alex Stewart	UD	12	Jun 26, 1993	30 years, 250 days	Convention Hall, Atlantic City, New Jersey, U.S.	
29	Loss	28–1	Riddick Bowe	UD	12	Nov 13, 1992	30 years, 25 days	Thomas & Mack Center, Paradise, Nevada, U.S.	Lost WBA, WBC, and IBF heavyweight titles
28	Win	28–0	Larry Holmes	UD	12	Jun 19, 1992	29 years, 244 days	Caesars Palace, Paradise, Nevada, U.S.	Retained WBA, WBC, and IBF heavyweight titles
27	Win	27–0	Bert Cooper	TKO	7 (12), 2:58	Nov 23, 1991	29 years, 35 days	Omni Coliseum, Atlanta, Georgia, U.S.	Retained WBA and IBF heavyweight titles
26	Win	26–0	George Foreman	UD	12	Apr 19, 1991	28 years, 182 days	Convention Hall, Atlantic City, New Jersey, U.S.	Retained WBA, WBC, and IBF heavyweight titles
25	Win	25–0	Buster Douglas	KO	3 (12), 1:10	Oct 25, 1990	28 years, 6 days	The Mirage, Paradise, Nevada, U.S.	Won WBA, WBC, and IBF heavyweight titles
24	Win	24–0	Seamus McDonagh	TKO	4 (12), 0:44	Jun 1, 1990	27 years, 225 days	Convention Hall, Atlantic City, New Jersey, U.S.	Retained WBC Continental Americas heavyweight title
23	Win	23–0	Alex Stewart	TKO	8 (12), 2:51	Nov 4, 1989	27 years, 16 days	Trump Plaza Hotel and Casino, Atlantic City, New Jersey, U.S.	Retained WBC Continental Americas heavyweight title
22	Win	22–0	Adílson Rodrigues	KO	2 (12), 1:29	Jul 15, 1989	26 years, 269 days	Caesars Tahoe, Stateline, Nevada, U.S.	Retained WBC Continental Americas heavyweight title
21	Win	21–0	Michael Dokes	TKO	10 (12), 1:41	Mar 11, 1989	26 years, 143 days	Caesars Palace, Paradise, Nevada, U.S.	Won WBC Continental Americas heavyweight title
20	Win	20–0	Pinklon Thomas	RTD	7 (10), 3:00	Dec 9, 1988	26 years, 51 days	Convention Hall, Atlantic City, New Jersey, U.S.	
19	Win	19–0	James Tillis	RTD	5 (10), 3:00	Jul 15, 1988	25 years, 270 days	Caesars Tahoe, Stateline, Nevada, U.S.	
18	Win	18–0	Carlos de León	TKO	8 (12), 1:08	Apr 9, 1988	25 years, 173 days	Caesars Palace, Paradise, Nevada, U.S.	Retained WBA and IBF cruiserweight titles; Won WBC cruiserweight title
17	Win	17–0	Dwight Muhammad Qawi	KO	4 (15), 2:30	Dec 5, 1987	25 years, 47 days	Convention Hall, Atlantic City, New Jersey, U.S.	Retained WBA and IBF cruiserweight titles
16	Win	16–0	Ossie Ocasio	TKO	11 (15), 1:24	Aug 15, 1987	24 years, 300 days	Parking de Nouveau Port, Saint-Tropez, France	Retained WBA and IBF cruiserweight titles
15	Win	15–0	Ricky Parkey	TKO	3 (15), 2:44	May 15, 1987	24 years, 208 days	Caesars Palace, Paradise, Nevada, U.S.	Retained WBA cruiserweight title; Won IBF cruiserweight title
14	Win	14–0	Henry Tillman	TKO	7 (15), 1:43	Feb 14, 1987	24 years, 118 days	Bally's, Reno, Nevada, U.S.	Retained WBA cruiserweight title
13	Win	13–0	Mike Brothers	TKO	3 (10)	Dec 8, 1986	24 years, 50 days	Paris, France	
12	Win	12–0	Dwight Muhammad Qawi	SD	15	Jul 12, 1986	23 years, 266 days	Omni Coliseum, Atlanta, Georgia, U.S.	Won WBA cruiserweight title
11	Win	11–0	Terry Mims	KO	5 (10), 1:12	May 28, 1986	23 years, 211 days	Metairie, Louisiana, U.S.	
10	Win	10–0	Jesse Shelby	KO	3 (10)	Apr 6, 1986	23 years, 169 days	Corpus Christi, Texas, U.S.	
9	Win	9–0	Chisanda Mutti	TKO	3 (10), 1:37	Mar 1, 1986	23 years, 133 days	Host Resort, Lancaster, Pennsylvania, U.S.	
8	Win	8–0	Anthony Davis	TKO	4 (10), 1:31	Dec 21, 1985	23 years, 63 days	Pavilion Convention Center, Virginia Beach, Virginia, U.S.	
7	Win	7–0	Jeff Meachem	TKO	5 (8), 1:02	Oct 30, 1985	23 years, 11 days	Broadway by the Bay Theater, Atlantic City, New Jersey, U.S.	
6	Win	6–0	Rick Myers	TKO	1 (8), 3:00	Aug 29, 1985	22 years, 314 days	Omni Coliseum, Atlanta, Georgia, U.S.	
5	Win	5–0	Tyrone Booze	UD	8	Jul 20, 1985	22 years, 274 days	Scope, Norfolk, Virginia, U.S.	
4	Win	4–0	Mark Rivera	TKO	2 (8), 2:46	Apr 20, 1985	22 years, 183 days	Memorial Coliseum, Corpus Christi, Texas, U.S.	
3	Win	3–0	Fred Brown	TKO	1 (6), 1:56	Mar 13, 1985	22 years, 145 days	Scope, Norfolk, Virginia, U.S.	
2	Win	2–0	Eric Winbush	UD	6	Jan 20, 1985	22 years, 93 days	Broadway by the Bay Theater, Atlantic City, New Jersey, U.S.	
1	Win	1–0	Lionel Byarm	UD	6	Nov 15, 1984	22 years, 27 days	Madison Square Garden, New York City, New York, U.S.	

== Exhibition boxing record ==
2 fights	1 win	1 loss
By knockout	1	1

No.	Result	Record	Opponent	Type	Round, time	Date	Age	Location	Notes
2	Loss	1–1	Vitor Belfort	TKO	1 (8), 1:49	Sep 11, 2021	58 years, 327 days	Seminole Hard Rock Hotel & Casino, Hollywood, Florida, U.S.	
1	Win	1–0	Mitt Romney	TKO	2	May 15, 2015	52 years, 208 days	The Rail Event Center, Salt Lake City, Utah, U.S.	

== Titles in boxing ==
=== Major world titles ===
- WBA cruiserweight champion (200 lbs)
- WBC cruiserweight champion (200 lbs)
- IBF cruiserweight champion (200 lbs)
- WBA heavyweight champion (200+ lbs) (4×)
- WBC heavyweight champion (200+ lbs)
- IBF heavyweight champion (200+ lbs) (3×)

=== Minor world titles ===
- WBF heavyweight champion (200+ lbs)

=== Regional/International titles ===
- WBC Continental Americas heavyweight champion (200+ lbs)
- USBA heavyweight champion (200+ lbs)

=== Undisputed titles ===
- Undisputed cruiserweight champion
- Undisputed heavyweight champion

== Pay-per-view bouts ==
No.	Date	Fight	Billing	Buys	Network
1	October 25, 1990	Holyfield vs. Douglas	The Moment of Truth	1,000,000	HBO
2	April 19, 1991	Holyfield vs. Foreman	The Battle of the Ages	1,400,000	HBO
3	June 19, 1992	Holyfield vs. Holmes	Class of Champions	730,000	HBO
4	November 13, 1992	Holyfield vs. Bowe	Evander Holyfield vs. Riddick Bowe	900,000	HBO
5	November 6, 1993	Holyfield vs. Bowe II	Repeat or Revenge	950,000	HBO
6	May 20, 1995	Holyfield vs. Mercer	The Warrior Returns	?	HBO
7	November 4, 1995	Holyfield vs. Bowe III	The Final Chapter	650,000	HBO
8	November 6, 1996	Tyson vs. Holyfield	Finally	1,590,000	Showtime
9	June 28, 1997	Holyfield vs. Tyson II	The Sound and the Fury	1,990,000	Showtime
10	November 8, 1997	Holyfield vs. Moorer II	Return to Glory	550,000	Showtime
11	March 13, 1999	Holyfield vs. Lewis	Undisputed	1,200,000	HBO
12	November 13, 1999	Holyfield vs. Lewis II	Unfinished Business	850,000	HBO
13	August 12, 2000	Holyfield vs. Ruiz	Justice	185,000	Showtime
14	March 3, 2001	Holyfield vs. Ruiz II	The Last Word	160,000	Showtime
15	October 4, 2003	Toney vs. Holyfield	The War on October 4	150,000	Showtime
16	September 11, 2021	Holyfield vs. Belfort	No Holds Barred	150,000	Triller
		Total sales		12,455,000	

== See also ==
- List of cruiserweight boxing champions
- List of heavyweight boxing champions
- List of WBA world champions
- List of WBC world champions
- List of IBF world champions
- List of undisputed boxing champions

== Notes ==
Sporting positions
Amateur boxing titles
Previous: Ricky Womack	U.S. Golden Gloves light heavyweight champion 1984	Next: Donald Stephens
Regional boxing titles
Preceded by Michael Dokes	WBC Continental Americas heavyweight champion March 11, 1989 – October 25, 1990; Won world title	Vacant Title next held by Marcelo Victor Figueroa
Vacant Title last held by Shannon Briggs	USBA heavyweight champion November 10, 2006 – February 2007; Vacated	Vacant Title next held by Eddie Chambers
Minor world boxing titles
Vacant Title last held by Richel Hersisia	WBF (Federation) heavyweight champion April 10, 2010 – May 2011; Vacated	Vacant Title next held by Michael Grant
Major world boxing titles
Preceded by Dwight Muhammad Qawi	WBA cruiserweight champion July 12, 1986 – December 1988; Vacated	Vacant Title next held by Taoufik Belbouli
Preceded by Ricky Parkey	IBF cruiserweight champion May 15, 1987 – December 1988; Vacated	Vacant Title next held by Glenn McCrory
Preceded by Carlos de León	WBC cruiserweight champion April 9, 1988 – December 1988; Vacated	Vacant Title next held by Carlos de León
Inaugural champion	Undisputed cruiserweight champion April 9, 1988 – December 1988; Titles fragmented	Vacant Title next held by O'Neil Bell
Preceded by Buster Douglas	WBA heavyweight champion October 25, 1990 – November 13, 1992	Succeeded by Riddick Bowe
Preceded by Buster Douglas	WBC heavyweight champion October 25, 1990 – November 13, 1992	Succeeded by Riddick Bowe
Preceded by Buster Douglas	IBF heavyweight champion October 25, 1990 – November 13, 1992	Succeeded by Riddick Bowe
Preceded by Buster Douglas	Undisputed heavyweight champion October 25, 1990 – November 13, 1992	Succeeded by Riddick Bowe
Preceded by Riddick Bowe	WBA heavyweight champion November 6, 1993 – April 22, 1994	Succeeded by Michael Moorer
Preceded by Riddick Bowe	IBF heavyweight champion November 6, 1993 – April 22, 1994	Succeeded by Michael Moorer
Preceded by Mike Tyson	WBA heavyweight champion November 9, 1996 – November 13, 1999	Succeeded by Lennox Lewis
Preceded by Michael Moorer	IBF heavyweight champion November 8, 1997 – November 13, 1999	Succeeded by Lennox Lewis
Vacant Title last held by Lennox Lewis	WBA heavyweight champion August 12, 2000 – March 3, 2001	Succeeded by John Ruiz
Awards
Previous: Mike Tyson	The Ring Fighter of the Year; 1987	Next: Mike Tyson
Previous: Pernell Whitaker	BWAA Fighter of the Year; 1990	Next: James Toney
Previous: Robert Quiroga vs. Akeem Anifowoshe	The Ring Fight of the Year vs. Riddick Bowe; 1992	Next: Michael Carbajal vs. Humberto González
Previous: Aaron Davis vs. Mark Breland; Round 9	The Ring Round of the Year vs. Riddick Bowe; Round 10; 1992	Next: Terry Norris vs. Troy Waters; Round 2
Previous: Oscar De La Hoya	The Ring Fighter of the Year; 1996, 1997	Next: Floyd Mayweather Jr.
Previous: Oscar De La Hoya	BWAA Fighter of the Year; 1996, 1997	Next: Shane Mosley
Previous: Saman Sorjaturong vs. Humberto González	The Ring Fight of the Year vs. Mike Tyson; 1996	Next: Arturo Gatti vs. Gabriel Ruelas
Previous: Willy Salazar; TKO7 Danny Romero	The Ring Upset of the Year; TKO11 Mike Tyson; 1996	Next: Vince Phillips; TKO10 Kostya Tszyu
Previous: Jonah Lomu	BBC Overseas Sports; Personality of the Year; 1996; With: Michael Johnson	Next: Martina Hingis
