= Evander Holyfield vs. John Ruiz =

Boxing match

Justice
- Date: August 12, 2000
- Venue: Paris Las Vegas, Paradise, Nevada, U.S.
- Title(s) on the line: vacant WBA heavyweight title

Tale of the tape
Boxer	Evander Holyfield	John Ruiz
Nickname	The Real Deal	The Quietman
Hometown	Atlanta, Georgia, U.S.	Chelsea, Massachusetts, U.S.
Purse	$5,000,000	$1,100,000
Pre-fight record	36–4–1 (25 KO)	36–3 (27 KO)
Age	37 years, 9 months	28 years, 7 months
Height	6 ft 2 1/2 in (189 cm)	6 ft 2 in (188 cm)
Weight	221 lb (100 kg)	224 lb (102 kg)
Style	Orthodox	Orthodox
Recognition	WBA; No. 2 Ranked Heavyweight; 2-division undisputed world champion	WBA; No. 1 Ranked Heavyweight

Result
- Holyfield wins via 12-round unanimous decision (116–112, 114–113, 114–113)

Evander Holyfield vs. John Ruiz, billed as Justice, was a professional boxing match contested on August 12, 2000 for the vacant WBA heavyweight championship.

== Background ==
After Lennox Lewis defeated Evander Holyfield at the second attempt to become the undisputed heavyweight champion, the WBA ordered Lewis to face its top contender John Ruiz, where as Lewis wanted to first defend his titles against WBC and IBF number two contender Michael Grant. The WBA and Lewis agreed that he would fight Grant first followed by Ruiz. Ruiz's promoter Don King challenged the decision in court and a clause was found in Lewis' contract that stated the winner of the Holyfield–Lewis fight would first defend his titles against the WBA's number one contender. Because of this, Lewis was stripped of his WBA title. The WBA chose Holyfield to face Ruiz for the vacant WBA Heavyweight title.

The co feature of the bout was set to be a mandatory defence for WBA welterweight champion James Page against Andrew Lewis, however it was called off at a few days notice after a dispute over the purse bid. As a result a bout between Rosendo Álvarez and Beibis Mendoza, which was originally part of the undercard for the Tim Austin vs. Arthur Johnson bout held the day before, was moved to fill the slot on the Holyfield Ruiz card.

== The fight ==
Ruiz was aggressive throughout the fight landing many effective jabs, and except for late in the third round, he was never really in any serious trouble from Holyfield.

Judges Duane Ford and Dave Moretti scored the fight 114–113, while Fernando Viso scored it 116–112 giving Evander Holyfield victory by unanimous decision to become the first boxer in history to be the World Heavyweight Champion four times.

=== Main event scorecards ===
Nevada State Athletic Commission Official score card
Title: Justice					Referee: Richard Steele					Supervisor:				
Date: 12 August 2000					Venue: Paris Las Vegas					Promoter: Don King				
Holyfield		vs.	Ruiz		Holyfield		vs.	Ruiz		Holyfield		vs.	Ruiz	
RS	TS	Rd	TS	RS	RS	TS	Rd	TS	RS	RS	TS	Rd	TS	RS
9		1		10	9		1		10	9		1		10
10	19	2	19	9	9	18	2	20	10	9	18	2	20	10
10	29	3	28	9	10	28	3	28	8	10	28	3	28	8
9	38	4	38	10	9	37	4	38	10	9	37	4	38	10
9	47	5	48	10	9	46	5	48	10	9	46	5	48	10
10	57	6	57	9	9	55	6	58	10	9	55	6	58	10
10	67	7	66	9	10	65	7	67	9	10	65	7	67	10
9	76	8	76	10	10	75	8	76	9	9	74	8	77	10
10	86	9	85	9	10	85	9	85	9	10	84	9	86	9
10	94	10	94	9	10	95	10	94	9	10	94	10	95	9
10	104	11	103	9	9	104	11	104	10	10	104	11	104	9
10	116	12	112	9	10	114	12	113	9	10	114	12	113	9
FINAL SCORE	116	–	112	FINAL SCORE	FINAL SCORE	114	–	113	FINAL SCORE	FINAL SCORE	114	–	113	FINAL SCORE
Won			Lost		Won			Lost		Won			Lost	
Judge: Fernando Viso					Judge: Duane Ford					Judge: Dave Moretti				
Suspensions: None					Point deductions: None					Decision: Unanimous decision for Holyfield				

== Aftermath ==
The decision was controversial as many observers and boxing reporters felt that the underdog Ruiz had done enough to win. In interviews after the fight Ruiz said "It was highway robbery without a gun,... I won the fight and he knows I won the fight...I had control of the fight. I am very surprised by the judges' decision. I don't know what fight they saw." Showtime commentators described the decision as "absurd" and "ridiculous".

Due to this controversial decision, an immediate rematch was ordered to take place in early 2001

Eight days after refereeing the co featured bout, referee Mitch Halpern committed suicide at his home in Las Vegas.

== Undercard ==
Confirmed bouts:

Winner	Loser	Weight division/title belt(s) disputed	Result
(Colombia) Beibis Mendoza	(Nicaragua) Rosendo Álvarez	vacant WBA World light flyweight title	7th round DQ.
Non-TV bouts
(Puerto Rico) Daniel Seda	(Colombia) Oscar León	vacant WBA Fedelatin featherweight title	8th round TKO.
(United States) Richie Melito	(United States) Thomas Williams	Heavyweight (10 rounds)	1st round KO.
(United States) Christy Martin	(United States) Dianna Lewis	Welterweight (10 rounds)	Unanimous Decision.
(Puerto Rico) Carlos Quintana	(Mexico) Miguel Avila	Welterweight (10 rounds)	1st round TKO.
(United States) Jeffrey Hill	(United States) Shakir Ashanti	Super Welterweight (6 rounds)	4th round TKO.
(Belarus) Siarhei Liakhovich	(United States) Tracy Wilson	Heavyweight (4 rounds)	1st round KO.

== Broadcasting ==
Country	Broadcaster
United States	Showtime

Preceded by vs. Lennox Lewis II	Evander Holyfield' bouts 12 August 2000	Succeeded by Rematch
Preceded by vs. Thomas Williams	John Ruiz's bouts 12 August 2000	Succeeded by Rematch
