= Seamus McDonagh (boxer) =

American boxer

Seamus McDonagh is a retired professional boxer who currently works as an actor, screenwriter and filmmaker.

== Early life ==
McDonagh was born in Birmingham, England, and raised in Enfield, County Meath, Ireland. He moved to the United States with his dad as a teenager and took up residence in Bay Ridge, Brooklyn. He joined the 18th Avenue Boxing Club where he met boxing trainers Neil Ferrara, Joe and Nick (The Thin Man) Baffi who along with his dad, Jim McDonagh trained him for the 1983 Golden Gloves.

== Career ==
McDonagh fought at light-heavyweight and lost a split decision in the quarter-finals to David Harris, the eventual winner. In the 1984 Golden Gloves he fought out the Times Square Boxing Gym again lost a split decision in the heavyweight division to Ira Turner, the eventual champion. On a trip to the Catskills, Seamus visited legendary trainer Cus D'Amato and was offered the opportunity to live and train under Cus' tutelage, along with another then unknown teenager named Mike Tyson. Seamus declined, returned to Brooklyn and in 1985 won the New York State Golden Gloves heavyweight division scoring KO's in all four of his victories. Later that year he turned professional and used the money he obtained from the signing bonus to pay for his second semester at Saint John's University. It was during this time that Seamus became familiar with novelist Norman Mailer. They corresponded for many years.

Seamus took most of his classes at the Staten Island campus and became a member of the fraternity Sigma Chi Upsilon (EXY).

In 1989 he danced with the brothers of EXY as "The Blues Brothers East", doing a half-time routine for the New York Knicks at Madison Square Garden. They also performed for St. John's University basketball team at Alumni Hall. Later that year he won "Rusty Staub's" famous rib eating competition representing Madison Square Garden. He obtained an honors degree in English Literature St. John's University.

By 1990 he had a professional boxing record of 19-1-1, (14KO's) and was the #3 world ranked cruiserweight and #9 world ranked heavyweight. In the spring of 1990 the world of boxing was shocked when the seemingly unbeatable Iron Mike Tyson was KO'd by challenger Buster Douglas. This immediately ruled out the longtime highly anticipated match up between #1 ranked heavyweight contender Evander Holyfield and undisputed World Heavyweight Champion Mike Tyson.

On 1 June 1990, McDonagh took Tyson's place and fought WBC Continental Americas Heavyweight Champion Evander Holyfield He lost by a TKO in the fourth round. In his corner were his dad Jim, Nick and Joe Baffi, Bobby Barbero and Tommy Gallagher. He lost only 3 times in 23 professional fights and turned to acting after his retirement from boxing.

His first acting job was in Judy Gebauer's "Bobby Sands M.P.", directed by Nye Heron at the Irish Arts Center NY NY. His credits include "The Risen People" and "2by4", dir. by Jimmy Smallhorne, NY NY. "Observe the Sons of Ulster Marching Towards the Somme", dir. Naomi Gibson, San Francisco, CA. Lead in "The Shankill Road" dir. by Tess Downey, Hollywood CA.

He played the lead character in the play "Kid Shamrock", about the life of former #1 ranked world cruiser weight Bobby Cassidy.
