= Evander Holyfield vs. Hasim Rahman =

2002 professional boxing match

The Royal Comeback
- Date: June 1, 2002
- Venue: Convention Hall in Atlantic City, New Jersey, U.S.

Tale of the tape
Boxer	Evander Holyfield	Hasim Rahman
Nickname	The Real Deal	The Rock
Hometown	Atlanta Georgia, U.S.	Baltimore, Maryland, U.S.
Purse	$5,000,000	$2,000,000
Pre-fight record	37–5–2	35–3
Height	6 ft 2 in (188 cm)	6 ft 2 in (188 cm)
Weight	216 lb (98 kg)	224 lb (102 kg)
Style	Orthodox	Orthodox
Recognition	WBC/WBA; No. 2 Ranked Heavyweight; IBF; No. 4 Ranked Heavyweight; 2-division undisputed world champion	WBC/IBF; No. 3 Ranked Heavyweight; WBA; No. 9 Ranked Heavyweight; Former unified heavyweight champion

Result
- Holyfield wins via 8th-round split technical decision (69-64, 66-67, 69-64)

Evander Holyfield vs. Hasim Rahman, billed as The Royal Comeback, was a professional boxing match contested on June 1, 2002.

== Background ==
In April 2002, it was announced that Evander Holyfield and Hasim Rahman would face each other in June of that year in Atlantic City. The bout was a WBC "eliminator", with the winner to be named the number-one contender to the WBC heavyweight title then held by Lennox Lewis. Both Holyfield and Rahman had held and then lost a version of the heavyweight title the previous year; Holyfield had lost the WBA heavyweight title to John Ruiz in May 2001 and then fought to a draw in December in an unsuccessful bid to regain the title, while Rahman had defeated Lewis in April 2001 to win the WBC and IBF heavyweight titles but lost them in a rematch to Lewis in November.

The fight was promoted by Don King, who was making his return to the state of New Jersey after having previously been banned from promoting fights there in 1994 due to an indictment for insurance fraud. King dubbed the event "The Royal Comeback" as a result.

The Holyfield–Rahman fight was held on June 1, 2002 only one week before the highly anticipated fight between Lewis and Mike Tyson, causing the former fight to be overshadowed by the latter. HBO Sports president Ross Greenberg hoped the Holyfield–Rahman fight would benefit from the hype surrounding the Lewis–Tyson bout stating "It'll be like the Golden Globes before the Oscars." King, however, would claim " We have the only fight in June!"

== The fight ==
Holyfield controlled the majority of the fight, landing more total punches (129 to Rahman's 118) and having a decisive edge in power punches (102 to Rahman's 71). In the seventh round, Holyfield hit Rahman with a headbutt that caused a massive hematoma to develop above Rahman's left eye and Rahman's corner-man tried to stop the swelling between rounds seven and eight to no avail. Rahman would go out and fight in the eight round, but as the hematoma continue to swell and effect Rahman's vision, the referee stopped the fight midway through the round and after consulting with the ringside physician, the fight was stopped. The decision would then go to the judge's scorecards, one judge had Rahman ahead by the score 67–66, but the other two had Holyfield winning with identical, scores of 69–64, leading to Holyfield being declared the winner by split technical decision.

== Aftermath ==
Rahman was critical of Holyfield after the fight, stating "I don't feel it was a fair or official fight. I don't feel Evander beat me tonight" and later joking at the post-fight press conference "I'm sitting here with an extra head" and that he would "wear a helmet next time."

After his knockout win over Tyson, Lewis vacated the IBF title at the urging of promoter Don King, which allowed King to put together a fight between Holyfield and Chris Byrd for the vacant belt with hopes of pitting the winner against the winner of the John Ruiz–Roy Jones Jr. WBA championship bout.

Rahman would go on to face David Tua in a rematch which was controversially scored a draw.

== Fight card ==
Weight Class	Weight		vs.		Method	Round	Time	Notes
Heavyweight	200+ lb	Evander Holyfield	def.	Hasim Rahman	TD	8/12
Heavyweight	200+ lb	Maurice Harris	def.	Siarhei Liakhovich	KO	9/10
Heavyweight	200+ lb	Friday Ahunanya	def.	Josué Blocus	SD	10/10
Heavyweight	200+ lb	Larry Donald	def	James Stanton	UD	10/10
Light Heavyweight	175 lb	Syd Vanderpool	def	Tyrus Armstead	TKO	10/10

== Broadcasting ==
Country	Broadcaster
United States	HBO

Preceded by vs. John Ruiz III	Evander Holyfield's bouts June 1 2002	Succeeded by vs. Chris Byrd
Preceded by vs. Lennox Lewis II	Hasim Rahman's bouts June 1 2002	Succeeded by vs. David Tua
