= Beibis Mendoza =

Colombian boxer (born 1974)

Personal information
- Nickname: Candela
- Nationality: Colombian
- Born: Beibis Antonio Mendoza; June 20, 1974 (age 52) Arboletes, Colombia
- Height: 5 ft 4 in (163 cm)
- Weight: light flyweight

Boxing career
- Stance: orthodox

Boxing record
- Total fights: 34
- Wins: 30
- Win by KO: 24
- Losses: 4

Beibis Antonio Mendoza (born 20 June 1974) is a Colombian professional boxer. He is a former WBA light-flyweight champion.

== Amateur career ==
Mendoza was a member of the 1996 Colombian Olympic Team as a Light Flyweight. His results were:

- Defeated Domenic Figliomeni (Canada) 12-1
- Lost to Oleg Kiryukhin (Ukraine) 6-18

== Professional career ==
Mendoza turned professional in 1996 and captured the vacant WBA light flyweight title with a DQ win in 2000 over Rosendo Alvarez. In the fight Alvarez suffered two point deductions and was eventually disqualified for low blows by referee Mitch Halpern, who committed suicide 8 days after the fight.

== Professional boxing record ==
34 fights	30 wins	4 losses
By knockout	24	1
By decision	5	3
By disqualification	1	0

No.	Result	Record	Opponent	Type	Round, time	Date	Location	Notes
34	Loss	30–4	Roberto Vásquez	KO	10 (12), 2:03	Apr 29, 2005	Figali Convention Center, Fort Amador, Panama	For vacant WBA light-flyweight title
33	Loss	30–3	Rosendo Álvarez	SD	12	Oct 2, 2004	Madison Square Garden, New York City, New York, US	For vacant WBA light-flyweight title; title only at stake for Mendoza as Álvarez missed weight.
32	Win	30–2	Choi Yo-sam	UD	12	Nov 15, 2003	Hongkuk Gymnasium, Yeosu, South Korea	Won inaugural WBA interim light-flyweight title
31	Loss	29–2	Rosendo Álvarez	MD	12	Mar 31, 2003	Statehouse Convention Center, Little Rock, Arkansas, US	For WBA light-flyweight title
30	Win	29–1	Manny Melchor	UD	8	Apr 12, 2002	Miccosukee Indian Gaming Resort, Miami, Florida, US	
29	Win	28–1	Edilberto Julio	KO	2 (10)	Sep 21, 2001	Barranquilla, Colombia	
28	Loss	27–1	Rosendo Álvarez	SD	12	Mar 3, 2001	Mandalay Bay Resort & Casino, Las Vegas, Nevada, US	Lost WBA light-flyweight title
27	Win	27–0	Rosendo Álvarez	DQ	7 (12), 0:52	Aug 12, 2000	Paris Las Vegas, Las Vegas, Nevada, US	Won vacant WBA light-flyweight title; Álvarez DQ'd for low blows
26	Win	26–0	Davis Arosemena	KO	3 (10), 0:52	Jun 16, 2000	Gimnasio Nuevo Panama, Juan Diaz, Panama	
25	Win	25–0	Rafael Orozco	KO	2 (8), 2:18	May 12, 2000	Jim Davidson Theatre, Pembroke Pines, Florida, US	
24	Win	24–0	Eduardo Manzano	KO	1 (8), 0:55	Mar 17, 2000	Jim Davidson Theatre, Pembroke Pines, Florida, US	
23	Win	23–0	Juan Valdez	TKO	4 (?)	Oct 1, 1999	Santa Marta, Colombia	
22	Win	22–0	Jhon Alberto Molina	TKO	5 (?)	Jun 12, 1999	Coliseo Bernardo Caraballo, Cartagena, Colombia	
21	Win	21–0	Victor Peralta	TKO	3 (?)	Apr 3, 1999	Hilton Hotel, Cartagena, Colombia	
20	Win	20–0	Luis Doria	TKO	9 (12)	Nov 28, 1998	Planeta Rica, Colombia	Won vacant Colombian light-flyweight title
19	Win	19–0	Henry Casarrubia	KO	3 (?)	Nov 1, 1998	San Juan de Uraba, Colombia	
18	Win	18–0	Ceferino Sanchez	KO	6 (?)	Sep 19, 1998	Cartagena, Colombia	
17	Win	17–0	Luis Blanco	PTS	8	Sep 4, 1998	Valledupar, Colombia	
16	Win	16–0	Jose Luis Bolanos	KO	4 (?)	Aug 14, 1998	Santa Marta, Colombia	
15	Win	15–0	Alfredo Toro	TKO	6 (?)	May 22, 1998	Santa Marta, Colombia	
14	Win	14–0	Juan Valdez	KO	1 (?)	Mar 16, 1998	Cartagena, Colombia	
13	Win	13–0	Dunoy Pena	KO	2 (?)	Dec 19, 1997	Coliseo Bernardo Caraballo, Cartagena, Colombia	
12	Win	12–0	Oscar Garces	KO	2 (?)	Dec 5, 1997	Rio Cedro, Colombia	
11	Win	11–0	Fidel Julio	KO	2 (?)	Oct 18, 1997	Cartagena, Colombia	
10	Win	10–0	Heberto Flores	PTS	8	Sep 5, 1997	Cartagena, Colombia	
9	Win	9–0	Wilfrido Palomino	KO	2 (?)	Jul 19, 1997	Cartagena, Colombia	
8	Win	8–0	Raul Benitez	KO	3 (?)	Apr 26, 1997	Jamundi, Colombia	
7	Win	7–0	Julio Moreno	TKO	2 (?)	Apr 12, 1997	Cartagena, Colombia	
6	Win	6–0	Emilio Castro	TKO	3 (?)	Mar 26, 1997	Cartagena, Colombia	
5	Win	5–0	Joel Garcia	KO	3 (?)	Mar 7, 1997	Cartagena, Colombia	
4	Win	4–0	Hernan Cardenas	TKO	3 (4)	Jan 31, 1997	Cartagena, Colombia	
3	Win	3–0	Manuel Suarez	PTS	4	Dec 20, 1996	Cartagena, Colombia	
2	Win	2–0	Uriel Londono	KO	2 (?)	Dec 6, 1996	Cartagena, Colombia	
1	Win	1–0	Pedro Rodriguez	TKO	2 (?)	Nov 1, 1996	Cartagena, Colombia	

Vacant Title last held by Pichitnoi Sitbangprachan	WBA light flyweight champion August 12, 2000 – March 3, 2001	Succeeded by Rosendo Alvarez
New title	WBA light flyweight champion Interim title November 15, 2003 – October 2, 2004; Lost bid for full title	Vacant Title next held by César Canchila
