= List of world mini-flyweight boxing champions =

This is a list of world mini-flyweight boxing champions (also known as minimumweight or strawweight), as recognized by the four major sanctioning organizations in boxing:

- The World Boxing Association (WBA), established in 1921 as the National Boxing Association (NBA). The WBA often recognize up to two world champions in a given weight class; Super champion and Regular champion.
- The World Boxing Council (WBC), established in 1963.
- The International Boxing Federation (IBF), established in 1983.
- The World Boxing Organization (WBO), established in 1988.

== IBF ==
Reign Began	Reign Ended	Champion	Recognition
Title inaugurated
1987-06-14	1987-12-16-Vacated	(South Korea) Kyung-Yung Lee	IBF
1988-03-24	1989-06-17	(Thailand) Samuth Sithnaruepol	IBF
1989-06-17	1989-09-21	(Indonesia) Nico Thomas	IBF
1989-09-21	1990-02-22	(Philippines) Eric Chávez	IBF
1990-02-22	1992-09-06	(Thailand) Fahlan Sakkreerin	IBF
1992-09-06	1992-12-10	(Philippines) Manny Melchor	IBF
1992-12-10	1996-03-15-Stripped	(Thailand) Ratanapol Sor Vorapin	IBF
1996-05-18	1997-12-27	(Thailand) Ratanapol Sor Vorapin	IBF
1997-12-27	2001-Vacated	(South Africa) Zolani Petelo	IBF
2001-04-29	2002-08-09	(Mexico) Roberto Carlos Leyva	IBF
2002-08-09	2003-05-31	(Colombia) Miguel Barrera	IBF
2003-05-31	2003-10-04	(Mexico) Edgar Cardenas	IBF
2003-10-04	2004-09-14	(Colombia) Daniel Reyes	IBF
2004-09-14	2007-07-07	(Indonesia) Muhammad Rachman	IBF
2007-07-07	2008-06-14	(Philippines) Florante Condes	IBF
2008-06-14	2010-03-26	(Mexico) Raúl García Hirales	IBF
2010-03-26	2012-09-01	(South Africa) Nkosinathi Joyi	IBF
2012-09-01	2013-03-30	(Mexico) Mario Rodríguez	IBF
2013-03-30	2014-08-09	(Japan) Katsunari Takayama	IBF
2014-08-09	2014-10-09-Vacated	(Mexico) Francisco Rodriguez, Jr.	IBF
2014-12-31	2015-12-31	(Japan) Katsunari Takayama	IBF
2015-12-31	2017-07-23	(Mexico) Jose Argumedo	IBF
2017-07-23	2018-07-23-Vacated	(Japan) Hiroto Kyoguchi	IBF
2018-12-01	2019-02-16	(United States) Carlos Licona	IBF
2019-02-16	2019-07-04-Vacated	(South Africa) Deejay Kriel	IBF
2019-09-07	2021-02-27	(Philippines) Pedro Taduran	IBF
2021-02-27	2022-07-01	(Philippines) Rene Mark Cuarto	IBF
2022-07-01	2023-10-07	(Mexico) Daniel Valladares	IBF
2023-10-07	2024-07-28	(Japan) Ginjiro Shigeoka	IBF
2024-07-28	Present	(Philippines) Pedro Taduran	IBF

== WBC ==
Reign Began	Reign Ended	Champion	Recognition
Title inaugurated
1987-10-18	1988-11-13	(Japan) Hiroki Ioka	WBC
1988-11-13	1989-11-12	(Thailand) Napa Kiatwanchai	WBC
1989-11-12	1990-02-07	(South Korea) Jum-Hwan Choi	WBC
1990-02-07	1990-10-25	(Japan) Hideyuki Ohashi	WBC
1990-10-25	1999-09-28-Vacated	(Mexico) Ricardo López	WBC
1999-09-28	2000-02-11	(Thailand) Wandee Singwangcha	WBC
2000-02-11	2004-01-10	(Mexico) José Antonio Aguirre	WBC
2004-01-10	2004-12-18	(Thailand) Eagle Kyowa	WBC
2004-12-18	2005-04-04	(Mexico) Isaac Bustos	WBC
2005-04-04	2005-08-06	(Japan) Katsunari Takayama	WBC
2005-08-06	2007-11-29	(Thailand) Eagle Kyowa	WBC
2007-11-29	2011-02-11	(Thailand) Oleydong Sithsamerchai	WBC
2011-02-11	2012-06-30-Vacated	(Japan) Kazuto Ioka	WBC
2012-11-24	2014-02-05	(China) Xiong Zhao Zhong	WBC
2014-02-05	2014-11-06	(Mexico) Oswaldo Novoa	WBC
2014-11-06	2020-11-27	(Thailand) Wanheng Menayothin	WBC
2020-11-27	2023-10-07	(Thailand) Panya Pradabsri	WBC
2023-10-07	2024-03-31	(Japan) Yudai Shigeoka	WBC
2024-03-31	2026-05-16	(Philippines) Melvin Jerusalem	WBC
2026-05-16	Present	(South Africa) Siyakholwa Kuse	WBC

== WBA ==
Reign Began	Reign Ended	Champion	Recognition
Title inaugurated
1988-01-10	1989-Vacated	(Venezuela) Leo Gamez	WBA
1989-04-16	1991-02-02	(South Korea) Kim Bong-jun	WBA
1991-02-02	1992-10-14	(South Korea) Hi-Yong Choi	WBA
1992-10-14	1993-02-10	(Japan) Hideyuki Ohashi	WBA
1993-02-10	1995-12-02	(Thailand) Chana Porpaoin	WBA
1995-12-02	1998-11-13-Stripped	(Nicaragua) Rosendo Alvarez	WBA
1998-11-13	1999-Stripped	(Mexico) Ricardo López	WBA
1999-10-09	2000-08-20-Stripped	(Venezuela) Noel Arambulet	WBA
2000-08-20	2000-12-06	(Philippines) Joma Gamboa	WBA
2000-12-06	2001-04-16	(Japan) Keitaro Hoshino	WBA
2001-04-16	2001-08-25	(Thailand) Chana Porpaoin	WBA
2001-08-25	2001-10-19-Retired	(Japan) Yutaka Niida	WBA
2002-01-29	2002-07-29	(Japan) Keitaro Hoshino	WBA
2002-07-29	2004-07-03-Stripped	(Venezuela) Noel Arambulet	WBA
2004-07-03	2008-09-15	(Japan) Yutaka Niida	WBA
2008-09-15	2010-10-08-Vacated	(Nicaragua) Román González	WBA
2010-11-05	2011-04-19	(Thailand) Kwanthai Sithmorseng	WBA
2011-04-19	2011-07-30	(Indonesia) Muhammad Rachman	WBA
2011-07-30	2011-10-24	(Thailand) Pornsawan Porpramook	WBA
2011-10-24	2012-06-20	(Japan) Akira Yaegashi	WBA
2012-06-20	2012-10-03-Vacated	(Japan) Kazuto Ioka	WBA
2012-12-31	2013-12-27-Vacated	(Japan) Ryo Miyazaki	WBA
2014-03-01	2016-03-19	(South Africa) Hekkie Budler	WBA Super Champion
2016-06-29	2024-11-16	(Thailand) Knockout CP Freshmart	WBA Super Champion
2024-11-16	Present	(Puerto Rico) Oscar Collazo	WBA Super Champion

== WBO ==
Reign Began	Reign Ended	Champion	Recognition
Title inaugurated
1989-08-30	1993-Vacated	(Dominican Republic) Rafael Torres	WBO
1993-05-15	1993-10-25-Vacated	(United Kingdom) Paul Weir	WBO
1993-12-22	1997-08-23	(Puerto Rico) Alex Sánchez	WBO
1997-08-23	1997-Vacated	(Mexico) Ricardo López	WBO
1997-12-19	1998-05-30	(Philippines) Eric Jamili	WBO
1998-05-30	2001-04-06-Vacated	(Colombia) Kermin Guardia	WBO
2002-06-29	2003-03-28	(Spain) Jorge Mata	WBO
2003-03-28	2003-05-03	(Nicaragua) Eduardo Ray Márquez	WBO
2003-05-03	2007-08-25-Vacated	(Puerto Rico) Ivan Calderón	WBO
2007-09-30	2011-02-25-Vacated	(Philippines) Donnie Nietes	WBO
2011-02-25	2011-08-27	(Mexico) Raúl García Hirales	WBO
2011-08-27	2013-04-19-Vacated	(Mexico) Moisés Fuentes	WBO
2013-04-19	2014-03-22	(Philippines) Merlito Sabillo	WBO
2014-03-22	2014-12-Vacated	(Mexico) Francisco Rodriguez, Jr.	WBO
2014-12-31	2015-03-02-Vacated	(Japan) Katsunari Takayama	WBO
2015-05-30	2016-04-07-Vacated	(Japan) Kosei Tanaka	WBO
2016-08-20	2017-04-14	(Japan) Katsunari Takayama	WBO
2017-04-14	2017-08-27	(Japan) Tatsuya Fukuhara	WBO
2017-08-27	2018-07-13	(Japan) Ryuya Yamanaka	WBO
2018-07-13	2019-08-24	(Philippines) Vic Saludar	WBO
2019-08-24	2021-12-14	(Puerto Rico) Wilfredo Méndez	WBO
2021-12-14	2023-01-06	(Japan) Masataka Taniguchi	WBO
2023-01-06	2023-05-27	(Philippines) Melvin Jerusalem	WBO
2023-05-27	Present	(Puerto Rico) Oscar Collazo	WBO

== See also ==
- List of British world boxing champions
