= Joma Gamboa =

Filipino boxer

Personal information
- Nickname: Gamboa Koizumi
- Nationality: (Philippines) Filipino
- Born: Jomarie Gamboa; April 25, 1973 (age 53) Bacolod, Philippines
- Height: 5 ft 6 1/2 in (169 cm)
- Weight: Minimumweight; Light flyweight

Boxing career
- Stance: Orthodox

Boxing record
- Total fights: 46
- Wins: 33
- Win by KO: 22
- Losses: 11
- Draws: 2

Jomarie Gamboa (born April 25, 1973, in Bacolod) is a retired boxer from the Philippines who was a former minimumweight champion.

== Professional career ==
He made his professional debut in 1993. He fought for his first world title in 1996 but was stopped by thai fighter Saman Sorjaturong. He was unsuccessful a further two times in world title fights before winning an interim title fight against Satoru Abe. On 20 August 2000, he fought full champion Noel Arambulet and won on points after Noel was stripped of the belt for failing to make weight. Gamboa ended up losing his belt in his first title defense in December of the same year to Keitaro Hoshino. In 2004 he ended his career. After two more unsuccessful title challenges Gamboa eventually retired in 2004.

== Professional boxing record ==
46 fights	33 wins	11 losses
By knockout	22	5
By decision	11	6
Draws	2	

No.	Result	Record	Opponent	Type	Round, time	Date	Location	Notes
46	Loss	33–11–2	(Indonesia) Hengky Wuwungan	TKO	3 (10)	Dec 21, 2004	Jakarta, Indonesia	
45	Loss	33–10–2	(Indonesia) Angky Angkotta	UD	10	Nov 30, 2004	RCTI Studio, Jakarta, Indonesia	
44	Loss	33–9–2	(Indonesia) Dickson Ton	SD	8	Nov 2, 2004	RCTI Studio, Jakarta, Indonesia	
43	Loss	33–8–2	(Mexico) Jorge Arce	KO	2 (12), 1:38	Jan 10, 2004	Centro Banamex, Mexico City, Mexico	For WBC light flyweight title
42	Win	33–7–2	(Philippines) Rodel Quilaton	UD	10	Sep 6, 2003	Superdome, Ormoc, Philippines	
41	Win	32–7–2	(Japan) Daisuke Iida	UD	10	Nov 17, 2002	Granship, Shizuoka, Japan	
40	Draw	31–7–2	(Philippines) Juanito Rubillar	TD	3 (12), 2:29	May 31, 2002	Elorde Sports Center, Parañaque, Philippines	For WBC International light flyweight title; fight stopped due to cut suffered by Gamboa after accidental clash of heads
39	Loss	31–7–1	(Japan) Keitaro Hoshino	UD	12	Jan 29, 2002	Pacifico Yokohama, Yokohama, Japan	For vacant WBA minimumweight title
38	Win	31–6–1	(Thailand) Ophat Niamprem	RTD	3 (10), 3:00	Aug 31, 2001	Antipolo, Philippines	
37	Win	30–6–1	(Thailand) Wicha Phulaikhao	TKO	5 (10)	May 5, 2001	Araneta Coliseum, Quezon City, Philippines	
36	Loss	29–6–1	(Japan) Keitaro Hoshino	UD	12	Dec 6, 2000	Pacifico Yokohama, Yokohama, Japan	Lost WBA minimumweight title
35	Win	29–5–1	(Venezuela) Noel Arambulet	SD	12	Aug 20, 2000	Ryōgoku Kokugikan, Tokyo, Japan	Won vacant WBA minimumweight title
34	Win	28–5–1	(Japan) Atsushi Sai	UD	12	Apr 9, 2000	Municipal Gymnasium, Hachinohe, Japan	Retained WBA interim minimumweight title
33	Win	27–5–1	(Japan) Satoru Abe	TKO	6 (12), 1:00	Dec 4, 1999	Inae Sports Center, Nagoya, Japan	Won vacant WBA interim minimumweight title
32	Loss	26–5–1	(Venezuela) Noel Arambulet	UD	12	Oct 9, 1999	Parque Nacionales Unidas, Caracas, Venezuela	For vacant WBA minimumweight title
31	Win	26–4–1	(Philippines) Noel Veronque	UD	10	Jul 31, 1999	Mandaue, Philippines	
30	Loss	25–4–1	(Thailand) Pichit Chor Siriwat	UD	12	Feb 20, 1999	Chaweng Beach Arena, Ko Samui, Thailand	For WBA light flyweight title
29	Win	25–3–1	(Philippines) Rudy Idanio	UD	10	Sep 26, 1998	Mandaue, Philippines	
28	Win	24–3–1	(Philippines) Ramil Gevero	TKO	6 (10)	Jun 21, 1998	Mandaue, Philippines	
27	Win	23–3–1	(Japan) Ryo Kurushima	TKO	9 (10), 2:17	Mar 7, 1998	Korakuen Hall, Tokyo, Japan	
26	Draw	22–3–1	(Philippines) Dennis Sabsal	MD	10	Dec 6, 1997	South Cotabato Stadium, Koronadal, Philippines	
25	Win	22–3	(Panama) Carlos Murillo	TKO	1 (12)	Sep 27, 1997	Gimnasio José Beracasa, Caracas, Venezuela	Won WBA Fedelatin light flyweight title
24	Win	21–3	(Philippines) Jerry Pahayahay	TKO	5 (10)	Aug 30, 1997	Mandaue, Philippines	
23	Win	20–3	(South Korea) Jang Woo-hee	TKO	3 (10)	Jun 14, 1997	Mactan Air Base Grounds, Lapu-Lapu City, Philippines	
22	Win	19–3	(Thailand) Chaweng Sangklam	KO	2 (10)	May 17, 1997	Luneta Park, Manila, Philippines	
21	Win	18–3	(Japan) Toru Shimabukuro	UD	8	Feb 23, 1997	Himeji, Japan	
20	Win	17–3	(Philippines) Jun Orhaliza	TKO	8 (10)	Sep 14, 1996	Mandaue Coliseum, Mandaue, Philippines	
19	Loss	16–3	(Thailand) Saman Sorjaturong	TKO	7 (12), 0:26	Apr 27, 1996	Regional Stadium, Maha Sarakham, Thailand	For WBC light flyweight title
18	Loss	16–2	(Mexico) Antonio Pérez	TKO	2 (10), 2:59	Aug 26, 1995	(United States) The Aladdin, Las Vegas, Nevada, U.S.	
17	Win	16–1	(Philippines) Teddy Pulido	TKO	3 (12)	Jun 24, 1995	Cebu Coliseum, Cebu City, Philippines	Retained PGAB Filipino minimumweight title
16	Win	15–1	(South Korea) Lee Chul-woo	KO	6 (10), 2:05	May 6, 1995	Korakuen Hall, Tokyo, Japan	
15	Win	14–1	(Philippines) Juhardi Juhardi	KO	1 (10)	Mar 11, 1995	Cebu Coliseum, Cebu City, Philippines	
14	Win	13–1	(Philippines) Jerry Pahayahay	UD	12	Nov 27, 1994	Bogo, Philippines	Won PGAB Filipino minimumweight title
13	Win	12–1	(Philippines) Leo Ramirez	UD	10	Oct 16, 1994	Bogo, Philippines	
12	Loss	11–1	(Philippines) Jerry Pahayahay	TKO	9 (12)	Jul 30, 1994	Cebu City, Philippines	Lost PGAB Filipino minimumweight title
11	Win	11–0	(Thailand) Aswin Sithlakmuang	KO	1 (10)	May 7, 1994	Cebu City, Philippines	
10	Win	10–0	(Philippines) Rudy Idanio	UD	12	Apr 9, 1994	Silay, Philippines	Won vacant PGAB Filipino minimumweight title
9	Win	9–0	(Philippines) Chris Galon	KO	2 (10)	Feb 27, 1994	Cebu City, Philippines	
8	Win	8–0	(Philippines) Ric Magramo	UD	10	Jan 8, 1994	Cebu Coliseum, Cebu City, Philippines	
7	Win	7–0	(Philippines) Dodie Boy Acabo	KO	1 (10)	Nov 27, 1993	Cebu City, Philippines	
6	Win	6–0	(Philippines) Nikki Maca	TKO	5 (10)	Oct 16, 1993	Cebu City, Philippines	
5	Win	5–0	(Philippines) Yen Jauculan	TKO	2 (8)	Sep 18, 1993	Cebu City, Philippines	
4	Win	4–0	(Philippines) Mike Luna	KO	2 (8)	Jul 24, 1993	Cebu City, Philippines	
3	Win	3–0	(Philippines) Nelson Nelmida	TKO	2 (6)	May 22, 1993	Cebu Coliseum, Cebu City, Philippines	
2	Win	2–0	(Philippines) Teddy Pulido	TKO	1 (6)	Apr 24, 1993	Cebu Coliseum, Cebu City, Philippines	
1	Win	1–0	(Philippines) Paul Abao	KO	1 (6)	Mar 27, 1993	Cebu City, Philippines	

== See also ==
- List of minimumweight boxing champions
- List of Filipino boxing world champions

Achievements
Vacant Title last held by Songkram Porpaoin	WBA minimumweight champion Interim Title; December 4, 1999 - August 20, 2000; Won full title	Vacant Title next held by Juan Jose Landaeta
Vacant Title last held by Noel Arambulet	WBA minimumweight champion August 20, 2000 - December 6, 2000	Succeeded by Keitaro Hoshino
