= Katsunari Takayama =

Japanese boxer (born 1983)

Katsunari Takayama 高山 勝成
Personal information
- Nickname: Lightning Kid
- Nationality: Japanese
- Born: May 12, 1983 (age 43) Osaka, Osaka, Japan
- Height: 5 ft 2 in (157 cm)
- Weight: Mini flyweight; Light flyweight

Boxing career
- Reach: 62 1/2 in (159 cm)
- Stance: Orthodox

Boxing record
- Total fights: 45
- Wins: 35
- Win by KO: 12
- Losses: 9
- No contests: 1

Katsunari Takayama (高山 勝成, Takayama Katsunari; born May 12, 1983) is a Japanese professional boxer. He is a five-time mini-flyweight world champion, having held the WBC title in 2005, the IBF title twice between 2013 and 2015, and the WBO title twice between 2014 and 2017. He retired as a professional in 2017, as WBO world champion, to focus on participation in the 2020 Olympics, but returned in 2020 after failing to qualify.

== Early life ==
Takayama weighed about 60 kg at the age of twelve. He started playing rugby and athletics, but did not last long. It was in summer in the second grade of junior high school that his friend brought him to a boxing gym. When he got started on the punching bag, despite he said he is going to be a world champion, he could not do more than three push-ups in a row. Even after his own workout, he had been watching senior boxers' sparring sessions and trainees' training.

== Professional boxing career ==
Takayama made his professional debut in October 2000 and won the All-Japan Rookie King Tournament in December 2001.

=== Japan ===
==== WBC title ====
On April 4, 2005, Takayama defeated Isaac Bustos for the WBC world title, by a unanimous decision. This victory gave Takayama the distinction of being the 50th Japanese fighter to win a world title. However, he lost a next bout against Eagle Kyowa by a unanimous decision, on August 6, 2005.

==== Interim WBA title ====
On November 7, 2006, he defeated Carlos Melo for the WBA interim title when he was originally supposed to face Yutaka Niida for the WBA title in September. However, due to a costal cartilage fracture Niida sustained from sparring, the fight would be delayed to April 7, 2007, ending in a split decision loss. After the fight, his then manager rejected the decision and uttered that it was a match fixing and that he would make civil litigation. However, he visited the JBC (Japan Boxing Commission) two days later and apologized for his rant saying that he had just wanted to pat his boxer on the back. Furthermore, most of the purse for that fight had not been paid. Although Takayama and Nakade announced that they would transfer to any other gym, the matters on the match fee and transfer fee were not resolved over months.

Takayama got another world title shot on July 14, 2009. This time, it was for the WBA minimumweight title which is held by Roman Gonzalez. Unsuccessfully, Takayama lost on all judges. He retired as a JBC-licensed boxer to fight for the WBO and IBF's titles in late 2009. At that time the JBC had approved no fight for the WBO and IBF's titles, but conditionally allowed them from February 28, 2011. That is because the West Japan Boxing Association to which Takayama and Ken'ichi Yamaguchi belonged strongly urged reform of the system after they issued retirement notices.

=== Away from Japan ===
Takayama then trained at his fellow boxer Ken'ichi Yamaguchi's Osaka Tenjin Boxing Gym in Japan and ALA Boxing Gym in the Philippines, and was promoted by ALA Promotions since April 2010.

He won an IBF minimumweight title eliminator via a sixth-round technical knockout at the Carnival City in Brakpan, Gauteng, South Africa in September 2010. He challenged Nkosinathi Joyi for that title at the Carnival City on January 29, 2011, after being postponed twice, but the fight ended in a no-contest due to a cut on Takayama's head after an accidental head-butt in the third round. He had a broken right hand since just before the fight.

Takayama rematched Joyi at the Orient Theatre in East London, Eastern Cape after postponed four times on March 30, 2012. It was the SABC-televised second boxing event after one year interruption. According to Japanese sources, Takayama reportedly dominated the whole fight except that he went down resulting from a slip in the fifth round, and stated with increased confidence through the twelve rounds that "I fought as was planned and did my best" after a unanimous decision loss with scores of 111–116 twice and 110–117. A boxing writer for South Africa's SuperSport wrote that "Many ringsiders were of the opinion that the decision could have gone in favour of the challenger" on Fightnews.com which was presented the WBA's Website of the Year in 2010. In addition, there were several articles showing that Joyi had struggled against Takayama. However the IBF's Lindsey Tucker has denied their views on BoxingScene.com.

He fought against Filipino Mateo Handig for the vacant IBF Pan Pacific mini flyweight title and the mandatory challenger status to the IBF mini flyweight title in La Trinidad, Benguet, Philippines on October 13, 2012. But he lost the fight via a split decision after being deducted a point in the fourth round for pushing. Two Filipino judges scored the fight 114–113 for Handig, while the other Thai judge scored it 115–112 for Takayama. The IBF ordered a rematch due to the inadequacy of the mandatory drug testing before and after the fight. After Handig's injury, Takayama earned the right to challenge for the world title.

==== IBF title ====
Takayama defeated Mario Rodríguez via a unanimous decision with the scores of 119–109, 117–111 and 115–113 to be crowned the IBF mini flyweight world champion at the Estadio Francisco Carranza Limón in Guasave, Sinaloa, Mexico on March 30, 2013. He was the first foreign boxer for ALA Promotions, and became the third ever world champion for them. "I'm gonna float like a butterfly and sting like a bee," Takayama had told at the pre-fight conference. He tried to imitate the Ali shuffle during the fight.

=== Return to Japan ===
The JBC joined the WBO and the IBF on April 1, 2013. After more than four years' absence from the ring in Japan, Takayama's boxer's license was issued again by the JBC on July 12, 2013. He registered with Nakazato Boxing Gym to defend his title against Vergilio Silvano via a unanimous decision at the Bodymaker Colosseum in Osaka on December 3, 2013.

While Takayama has gone through five gyms, his Japanese trainer for his entire career is Hiroaki Nakade who has so far served as the second/trainer in the world title bouts of all the four major sanctioning bodies i.e. the WBA, WBC, IBF (for Takayama fights) and WBO (for Orlando Salido vs. Yamaguchi).

== Professional boxing record ==
45 fights	35 wins	9 losses
By knockout	12	2
By decision	23	7
No contests	1	

No.	Result	Record	Opponent	Type	Round, time	Date	Location	Notes
45	Win	35–9 (1)	Kha Lu	UD	12	Dec 18, 2024	Bula Gymnasium, General Santos, Philippines	Won vacant IBO mini-flyweight title
44	Win	34–9 (1)	Jerome Baloro	UD	8	Sep 10, 2023	Edion Arena, Osaka, Japan	
43	Win	33–9 (1)	Joel Lino	UD	8	Jun 11, 2023	KBS Hall, Kyoto, Japan	
42	Loss	32–9 (1)	Elwin Soto	TKO	9 (12), 2:44	May 8, 2021	AT&T Stadium, Arlington, Texas, US	For WBO junior-flyweight title
41	Win	32–8 (1)	Reiya Konishi	UD	6	Dec 27, 2020	Edion Arena, Osaka, Japan	
40	Win	31–8 (1)	Riku Kano	TD	6 (12), 0:58	Aug 20, 2016	Komagatani Gym, Sanda, Japan	Won vacant WBO mini-flyweight title
39	Loss	30–8 (1)	José Argumedo	TD	9 (12), 3:00	Dec 31, 2015	Edion Arena, Osaka, Japan	Lost IBF mini-flyweight title
38	Win	30–7 (1)	Ryuji Hara	TKO	8 (12), 1:20	Sep 27, 2015	Edion Arena, Osaka, Japan	Retained IBF mini-flyweight title
37	Win	29–7 (1)	Fahlan Sakkreerin Jr.	TD	9 (12), 2:19	Apr 22, 2015	Bodymaker Colosseum, Osaka, Japan	Retained IBF mini-flyweight title
36	Win	28–7 (1)	Go Odaira	TKO	7 (12), 2:24	Dec 31, 2014	Bodymaker Colosseum, Osaka, Japan	Won vacant WBO and IBF mini-flyweight titles
35	Loss	27–7 (1)	Francisco Rodríguez Jr.	UD	12	Aug 9, 2014	Arena Monterrey, Monterrey, Mexico	Lost IBF mini-flyweight title; For WBO mini-flyweight title
34	Win	27–6 (1)	Shin Ono	UD	12	May 7, 2014	Bodymaker Colosseum, Osaka, Japan	Retained IBF mini-flyweight title
33	Win	26–6 (1)	Vergilio Silvano	UD	12	Dec 3, 2013	Bodymaker Colosseum, Osaka, Japan	Retained IBF mini-flyweight title
32	Win	25–6 (1)	Mario Rodríguez	UD	12	Mar 30, 2013	Estadio Francisco Carranza Limón, Guasave, Mexico	Won IBF mini-flyweight title
31	Loss	24–6 (1)	Mateo Handig	SD	12	Oct 13, 2012	Municipal Gymnasium, La Trinidad, Philippines	For vacant IBF Pan Pacific mini-flyweight title
30	Loss	24–5 (1)	Nkosinathi Joyi	UD	12	Mar 30, 2012	Orient Theatre, East London, South Africa	For IBF mini-flyweight title
29	NC	24–4 (1)	Nkosinathi Joyi	NC	3 (12), 1:59	Jan 29, 2011	Carnival City, Brakpan, South Africa	IBF mini-flyweight title at stake; NC after Takayama cut from accidental head clash
28	Win	24–4	Tshepo Lefele	TKO	6 (12), 0:51	Sep 1, 2010	Carnival City, Brakpan, South Africa	
27	Loss	23–4	Román González	UD	12	Jul 14, 2009	World Memorial Hall, Kobe, Japan	For WBA mini-flyweight title
26	Win	23–3	Roemart Sentillas	UD	8	Mar 12, 2009	World Memorial Hall, Kobe, Japan	
25	Win	22–3	Javier Murillo	UD	10	Sep 22, 2008	Prefectural Gymnasium, Osaka, Japan	
24	Win	21–3	Mating Kilakil	KO	9 (10), 3:08	Apr 28, 2008	Prefectural Gymnasium, Osaka, Japan	
23	Win	20–3	Ngaoprajan SIthsaithong	TKO	9 (10), 1:24	Jan 5, 2008	Prefectural Gymnasium, Osaka, Japan	
22	Win	19–3	Fabio Marfa	UD	10	Oct 6, 2007	Prefectural Gymnasium, Osaka, Japan	
21	Loss	18–3	Yutaka Niida	SD	12	Apr 7, 2007	Korakuen Hall, Tokyo, Japan	For WBA mini-flyweight title
20	Win	18–2	Carlos Melo	TD	9 (12), 1:30	Nov 7, 2006	Grand Cube, Osaka, Japan	Won WBA interim mini-flyweight title
19	Win	17–2	Satoshi Kogumazaka	TD	9 (10), 2:08	Mar 18, 2006	Korakuen Hall, Tokyo, Japan	Won Japanese mini-flyweight title
18	Win	16–2	Rollen Del Castillo	TD	8 (10), 0:21	Dec 3, 2005	Central Hall, Osaka, Japan	
17	Loss	15–2	Eagle Kyowa	UD	12	Aug 6, 2005	Korakuen Hall, Tokyo, Japan	Lost WBC mini-flyweight title
16	Win	15–1	Isaac Bustos	UD	12	Apr 4, 2005	Central Gym, Osaka, Japan	Won WBC mini-flyweight title
15	Win	14–1	Numchai Taksinisan	KO	3 (10), 1:48	Dec 8, 2004	Central Hall, Osaka, Japan	
14	Win	13–1	Elmer Gejon	MD	10	Aug 7, 2004	Prefectural Gymnasium, Osaka, Japan	
13	Win	12–1	Kosuke Fujiwara	UD	10	Feb 15, 2004	Central Gym, Osaka, Japan	
12	Win	11–1	Saming Twingym	TKO	3 (8), 1:23	Dec 21, 2003	Central Gym, Osaka, Japan	
11	Loss	10–1	Masato Hatakeyama	TKO	9 (10), 2:34	Apr 21, 2003	Korakuen Hall, Tokyo, Japan	For Japanese junior-flyweight title
10	Win	10–0	Songkram Porpaoin	MD	8	Oct 14, 2002	Korakuen Hall, Tokyo, Japan	
9	Win	9–0	Takashi Okajima	TKO	8 (10), 1:43	Jul 13, 2002	Central Gym, Osaka, Japan	
8	Win	8–0	Daisaku Kashiwagi	TKO	4 (8), 2:32	May 5, 2002	Central Gym, Osaka, Japan	
7	Win	7–0	Koyo Yamazaki	UD	6	Dec 15, 2001	Korakuen Hall, Tokyo, Japan	
6	Win	6–0	Yoshifumi Nishimura	TKO	2 (6), 2:04	Nov 18, 2001	Spark Chikujo, Chikujō, Japan	
5	Win	5–0	Daigoro Omagari	UD	6	Oct 13, 2001	City Hall, Nagoya, Japan	
4	Win	4–0	Hiroaki Kusunoki	MD	6	Sep 13, 2001	Prefectural Gymnasium, Osaka, Japan	
3	Win	3–0	Taiki Tatsuiwa	KO	2 (4)	Jul 22, 2001	Mizuno Sports, Osaka, Japan	
2	Win	2–0	Takashi Kunishige	UD	4	Apr 28, 2001	Azalea Taisho, Osaka, Japan	
1	Win	1–0	Yozo Nakamura	TKO	4 (4)	Oct 18, 2000	Archaic Hall, Amagasaki, Japan	

== See also ==
- Boxing in Japan
- List of Japanese boxing world champions
- List of world mini-flyweight boxing champions

== Bibliography ==
- Asazawa, Ei; Shibuya, Jun (September 10, 2007). 移籍騒動の高山、問題収束せぬまま10月に再起", "新井田豊、因縁の再戦に完勝. Boxing Magazine (in Japanese). No. October 2007 issue. Tokyo, Japan: Baseball Magazine Sha Co., Ltd. pp. 21, 61.
- Boxing Beat editorial department (February 15, 2012). MACC Publications Inc (ed.). インタビュー 高山勝成. Ironman. Boxing Beat (in Japanese) (special issue). Tokyo, Japan: Fitness Sports Co., Ltd.: 78.

Sporting positions
Regional boxing titles
Preceded by Satoshi Kogumazaka	Japanese mini-flyweight champion March 18, 2006 – 2006; Vacated	Vacant Title next held by Teruo Misawa
World boxing titles
Preceded by Isaac Bustos	WBC mini-flyweight champion April 4, 2005 – August 6, 2005	Succeeded by Eagle Kyowa
Vacant Title last held by Juan Jose Landaeta	WBA mini-flyweight champion Interim title November 7, 2006 – April 7, 2007; Lost bid for full title	Vacant Title next held by Sammy Gutiérrez
Preceded by Mario Rodríguez	IBF mini-flyweight champion March 30, 2013 – August 9, 2014	Succeeded by Francisco Rodríguez Jr.
Vacant Title last held by Francisco Rodríguez Jr.	IBF mini-flyweight champion December 31, 2014 – December 31, 2015	Succeeded by José Argumedo
Vacant Title last held by Francisco Rodríguez Jr.	WBO mini-flyweight champion December 31, 2014 – March 3, 2015; Vacated	Vacant Title next held by Kosei Tanaka
Vacant Title last held by Kosei Tanaka	WBO mini-flyweight champion August 20, 2016 – April 3, 2017; Retired	Succeeded by Tatsuya Fukuhara promoted from interim status
