= Jorge Mata =

Spanish boxer (born 1970)

Personal information
- Nationality: Spanish
- Born: Jorge Mata Ferradal; April 26, 1970 (age 56) León, Castile and León, Spain
- Height: 4 ft 11 in (150 cm)
- Weight: Mini flyweight

Boxing career
- Stance: Orthodox

Boxing record
- Total fights: 14
- Wins: 11
- Win by KO: 6
- Losses: 1
- Draws: 2

Jorge Mata Ferradal (born April 26, 1970), is a Spanish former professional boxer who competed from 1998 to 2006. He won the WBO minimumweight title in 2002.

== Professional career ==
Mata turned professional in 1998 & amassed a record of 8-0-2 before winning the WBO interim minimumweight title. He would get upgraded to full champion when incumbent titleholder Kermin Guardia, moved up in weight. Mata would lose the title to Nicaraguan contender Eduardo Ray Márquez via eleventh round stoppage.

== Professional boxing record ==
14 fights	11 wins	1 loss
By knockout	6	1
By decision	5	0
Draws	2	

No.	Result	Record	Opponent	Type	Round, time	Date	Location	Notes
14	Win	11–1–2	Cristian Niculae	PTS	6 (6)	2006-02-18	Leon, Spain	
13	Loss	10–1–2	Eduardo Ray Márquez	KO	11 (12)	2003-03-28	Pabellon, Madrid, Spain	Lost WBO Mini flyweight title
12	Win	10–0–2	Jairo Arango	UD	12 (12)	2002-11-22	Palacio Municipal de Deportes, Leon, Spain	Retained WBO Mini flyweight title
11	Win	9–0–2	Reynaldo Frutos	TKO	9 (12)	2002-06-29	Polideportivo Municipal, Son Moix, Spain	Won Interim WBO Mini flyweight title
10	Win	8–0–2	Andrei Mircea	TKO	6 (6)	2002-04-27	Madrid, Spain	
9	Draw	7–0–2	Christophe Rodrigues	PTS	6 (6)	2002-03-05	Polideportivo Magarinos, Madrid, Spain	
8	Win	7–0–1	Boris Radic	TKO	1 (6)	2000-12-16	Soria, Spain	
7	Win	6–0–1	Dunoy Pena	PTS	12 (12)	2000-07-14	Leon, Spain	
6	Win	5–0–1	Vladimir Jagunov	TKO	4 (12)	2000-02-11	Leon, Spain	
5	Win	4–0–1	Jozsef Regi	TKO	3 (8)	1999-09-24	Leon, Spain	
4	Win	3–0–1	Juan Carlos Diaz Quesada	PTS	6 (6)	1999-05-16	Madrid, Spain	
3	Win	2–0–1	Daniel Danila	TKO	2 (6)	1999-03-05	Bilbao, Spain	
2	Draw	1–0–1	Juan Carlos Diaz Quesada	PTS	6 (6)	1998-12-20	Madrid, Spain	
1	Win	1–0	Jose Ramon Bartolome	PTS	4 (4)	1998-11-22	Madrid, Spain	

== See also ==
- List of world mini-flyweight boxing champions

Sporting positions
World boxing titles
New title	WBO mini-flyweight champion Interim title June 29, 2002 – 2002; Promoted	Vacant Title next held by Daniel Reyes
Preceded by Kermin Guardia; Vacated	WBO mini-flyweight champion 2002 – March 28, 2003	Succeeded by Eduardo Ray Márquez
