= Ronnie Magramo =

Filipino boxer (born 1972)

Personal information
- Nickname: Toy Bulldog
- Nationality: Filipino
- Born: Ronnie Magramo; 1972 (age 53–54) Oriental Mindoro, Philippines
- Height: 152 cm (5 ft 0 in)
- Weight: Minimumweight

Boxing career
- Stance: Southpaw

Boxing record
- Total fights: 45
- Wins: 35
- Win by KO: 22
- Losses: 10

Ronnie Magramo (born 1972), is a retired Filipino professional boxer. He was a contender in the Minimumweight division (105 lbs) during the 1990s.

== Early life ==
Magramo was born in 1972 in Oriental Mindoro, Philippines. He comes from a family of boxers, including Ric Magramo Sr., a contender in the 1960s and 1970s, as well as Ric Magramo Jr., Melvin Magramo, and Giemel Magramo. The media has dubbed them the "Skull and Crossbones Family."

== Career ==
He made his professional debut in 1989 when he challenged Ala Villamor for the Philippines Minimumweight title. However, he suffered a knockout loss in the eighth round in 1992. Although he stood only 152 cm (5.0 ft), Magramo frequently traveled to Thailand to fight. While he did not always come out victorious, he consistently gave his local opponents a run for their money.

On August 22, 1993, he lost by unanimous decision to Chana Porpaoin in a WBA Minimumweight title bout held in Saraburi province. He returned to Thailand on February 22, 1994, to face Ratanapol Sor Vorapin for the IBF Mini Flyweight title in Bang Mun Nak district, Phichit province, but was once again defeated by unanimous decision. (Note: This fight was sponsored by Krating Daeng or Red Bull, also the first time that Red Bull has sponsored a world boxing event.)

Three months later, Magramo fought Wanwin Charoen for the Mini Flyweight title sanctioned by the World Boxing Federation, which marked the first WBF event held in Thailand. This time, he claimed victory by knockout in the second round. He successfully defended the title twice. His first defense was against Indonesian boxer Faisol Akbar in Manila. In his second defense, he narrowly defeated Thai boxer Nungdiaw Sakcharuporn by split decision on February 19, 1995, in Bangkok. However, he later lost the title to Fahsang Pongsawang in another match in Bangkok.

Magramo regained the title by knocking out Pongsawang in the tenth round at Ninoy Aquino Stadium in Malate, Manila. But on September 29, 1996, he lost the championship again to Pongsawang, this time by a wide margin on the judge's scorecards in a fight held in Selaphum district, Roi Et province, in northeastern Thailand.

After that, Magramo earned seven consecutive wins. On January 30, 1999, he challenged for the vacant WBA interim Minimumweight title against Songkram Porpaoin in Pattaya, Chonburi province. The bout ended in the eighth round due to a head injury suffered by Porpaoin, and Magramo lost by technical decision. He retired from professional boxing shortly afterward.

== Professional boxing record ==
45 fights	35 wins	10 losses
By knockout	22	2
By decision	13	8

No.	Result	Record	Opponent	Type	Round, Time	Date	Location	Notes
45	Loss	35–10	Songkram Porpaoin	TD	8 (12)	30 Jan 1999	Pattaya City Hall, Pattaya, Thailand	For WBA Interim minimumweight title; Majority technical decision; Fight stopped due to a cut on Porpaoin caused by an accidental headbutt
44	Win	35–9	Kid Payes	PTS	10	3 Oct 1998	Binan Sports Center, Binan City, Philippines	
43	Win	34–9	Kid Payes	PTS	10	30 Jul 1998	Elorde Sports Center, Paranaque City, Philippines	
42	Win	33–9	Rudolfo Hernandez	TD	4 (?)	14 Feb 1998	StarMall Las Piñas (Manuela 2), Las Piñas City	
41	Win	32–9	Krabuan Butrprom	PTS	10	6 Nov 1997	Sablayan, Mindoro Occidental, Philippines	
40	Win	31–9	Indhanon Jockygym	TKO	4 (?)	30 Jul 1997	Elorde Sports Center, Paranaque City, Philippines	
39	Win	30–9	Thuwachit Boongome	TKO	2 (?)	18 May 1997	Philippines	
38	Win	29–9	Jerry Pahayahay	UD	10	31 Jan 1997	San Jose, Mindoro Occidental, Philippines	
37	Loss	28–9	Fahsang Pongsawang	UD	12	29 Sep 1996	Selabhumi, Roi-Et, Thailand	Lost WBF minimumweight title
36	Win	28–8	Chihan Park	TKO	3 (10)	31 Jul 1996	Elorde Sports Center, Paranaque City, Philippines	
35	Win	27–8	Hiroyuki Kasoya	TKO	6 (?)	17 Feb 1996	Rizal Memorial Coliseum, Manila, Philippines	
34	Win	26–8	Fahsang Pongsawang	KO	10 (12)	30 Sep 1995	Ninoy Aquino Stadium, District of Malate, Manila, Philippines	Won WBF minimumweight title
33	Loss	25–8	Fahsang Pongsawang	PTS	12	8 Jul 1995	Bangkok, Thailand	Lost WBF minimumweight title
32	Win	25–7	Sung Rok Yuh	TKO	3 (10)	28 May 1995	Divine World College Gym, San Jose, Philippines	
31	Win	24–7	Nungdiaw Sakcharuporn	SD	12	19 Feb 1995	Thansettakit Building, Bangkok, Thailand	Retained WBF minimumweight title
30	Win	23–7	Hideo Suzuki	TKO	6 (?)	10 Dec 1994	Sablayan Astrodome, Sablayan, Philippines	
29	Win	22–7	Faisol Akbar	SD	12	8 Oct 1994	Cebu Coliseum, Cebu City, Philippines	Retained WBF minimumweight title
28	Win	21–7	Jaime Aliguin	PTS	10	13 Aug 1994	Cebu Coliseum, Cebu City, Philippines	
27	Win	20–7	Wanwin Charoen	KO	2 (12), 0:48	9 Jul 1994	Crocodile Farm, Samut Prakan, Thailand	Won vacant WBF minimumweight title
26	Loss	19–7	Ratanapol Sor Vorapin	UD	12	27 Feb 1994	Provincial Stadium, Phichit, Thailand	For IBF minimumweight title
25	Win	19–6	Hiroki Sakakibara	TKO	2 (10), 2:06	16 Feb 1993	Manila Midtown Ramada Hotel - Malate, Manila, Philippines	
24	Loss	18–6	Jaime Aliguin	PTS	10	28 Oct 1993	Elorde Sports Center, Paranaque City, Philippines	
23	Loss	18–5	Chana Porpaoin	UD	12	22 Aug 1993	Provincial Stadium, Sara Buri, Thailand	For WBA (Regular) minimumweight title
22	Win	18–4	Noel Tunacao	TKO	4 (10)	2 Feb 1993	Cuneta Astrodome, Pasay City, Philippines	
21	Win	17–4	Nikki Maca	PTS	10	28 Nov 1992	Philippines	
20	Win	16–4	Joel Revilla	TKO	5 (10)	28 Oct 1992	Elorde Sports Center, Paranaque City, Philippines	
19	Win	15–4	Joel Revilla	UD	10	8 Sep 2022	Rizal Memorial Coliseum, Manila, Philippines	
18	Loss	14–4	Ala Villamor	KO	8 (12)	13 Jun 1992	Cebu Coliseum, Cebu City, Philippines	For GAB minimumweight title
17	Loss	14–3	Pichit Sitbangprachan	TKO	8 (?)	29 May 1992	Bangkok, Thailand	
16	Win	14–2	Victor Gestupa	TKO	7 (?)	26 Feb 1992	Elorde Sports Center, Paranaque City, Philippines	
15	Win	13–2	Sammy Tyson Pagadan	TKO	7 (?)	20 Dec 1991	Philippines	
14	Win	12–2	Elmer Legaspi	TKO	1 (?)	30 Oct 1991	Philippines	
13	Win	11–2	Rommel Lawas	TKO	7 (?)	31 Aug 1991	Philippines	
12	Win	10–2	Perfecto Magistrado	KO	4 (?)	29 May 1991	Philippines	
11	Win	9–2	Eugene Flores	KO	2 (8), 2:00	21 Dec 1990	Manila, Metro Manila, Philippines	
10	Win	8–2	Marlon Gayundato	TKO	5 (10), 2:56	31 Oct 1990	Philippines	Won LuzProBa minimumweight title
9	Loss	7–2	Sammy Tyson Pagadan	UD	10	14 Sep 1990	Rizal Memorial Coliseum, Manila, Philippines	
8	Win	7–1	Jun Lau	TKO	3 (?), 2:09	20 Jul 1990	Ninoy Aquino Stadium, District of Malate, Manila, Philippines	
7	Win	6–1	Erwin Villamor	TKO	1 (?)	13 Jun 1990	Philippines	
6	Win	5–1	Toto Cadocio	PTS	8	3 Feb 1990	Philippines	
5	Win	4–1	Joe Saguid	UD	6	19 Jan 1990	San Juan City, Metro Manila, Philippines	
4	Win	3–1	Perfecto Magistrado	PTS	6	22 Dec 1989	Philippines	
3	Win	2–1	Joe Saguid	TKO	3 (4)	27 Aug 1989	Angeles City, Pampanga, Philippines	
2	Loss	1–1	Ala Villamor	PTS	6	4 Aug 1989	Ninoy Aquino Stadium, District of Malate, Manila, Philippines	
1	Win	1–0	Allan Hitsin	TKO	2 (?)	28 Jun 1989	Philippines	

== See also ==
- List of boxing families
