= Juan Jose Landaeta =

Venezuelan boxer

Personal information
- Nickname: Baby
- Born: October 7, 1978 (age 48) Maturin, Monagas, Venezuela
- Height: 5 ft 4 1/2 in (164 cm)
- Weight: minimumweight light flyweight

Boxing career
- Stance: Southpaw

Boxing record
- Total fights: 37
- Wins: 27
- Win by KO: 21
- Losses: 9
- Draws: 1
- No contests: 0

Juan Jose Landaeta (born October 7, 1978) is a professional boxer from Venezuela. Juan Jose fought for the World Boxing Association (WBA) light flyweight title and minimumweight title. Also, Juan Jose won the WBA interim minimumweight title.

Notable Fights

- W12 (UD) vs. Chana Porpaoin for interim WBA minimumweight title (2004-01-31)
- D12 vs. Chana Porpaoin for interim WBA minimumweight title (2004-05-05)
- L12 (SD) vs. Yutaka Niida for WBA minimumweight title (2004-10-30)
- L12 (SD) vs. Koki Kameda for

WBA light flyweight title (2006-08-02)

- L12 (UD) vs. Koki Kameda for WBA light flyweight title (2006-12-20)
- L11/12 (RTD) vs. Ryoichi Taguchi for WBA light flyweight title (2016-04-27)

== Professional boxing record ==
37 fights	27 wins	9 losses
By knockout	21	1
By decision	6	8
Draws	1	

No.	Result	Record	Opponent	Type	Round, Time	Date	Location	Notes
37	Loss	27–9–1	Ryoichi Taguchi	RTD	11 (12), 3:00	Apr 27, 2016	Ota City General Gymnasium, Tokyo, Japan	For WBA (Regular) light flyweight title
36	Win	27–8–1	Walter Tello	TKO	9 (10), 2:49	Sep 6, 2015	Techno Dome, Takaoka, Toyama, Japan	
35	Loss	26–8–1	Mark John Yap	UD	6	Jun 7, 2015	Bunka Center, Sanda, Hyōgo, Japan	
34	Win	26–7–1	Jose Isaias Sanchez	TKO	7 (8), 0:20	Dec 13, 2014	Club Agropatria, La Victoria, Aragua, Venezuela	
33	Loss	25–7–1	Francisco Rosas	MD	12	Jan 30, 2010	Auditorio Siglo XXI, Puebla, Mexico	
32	Win	25–6–1	Ronald Barrera	SD	11	Jun 7, 2008	Centro Olimpico, San Juan de los Morros, Venezuela	Won vacant WBA Fedelatin flyweight title
31	Win	24–6–1	Edwin Diaz	TKO	2 (10), 2:05	Jul 14, 2007	Roberto Durán Arena, Panama City, Panama	
30	Loss	23–6–1	Edwin Diaz	UD	8	Jun 2, 2007	Roberto Durán Arena, Panama City, Panama	
29	Loss	23–5–1	Kōki Kameda	UD	12	Dec 20, 2006	Ariake Coliseum, Tokyo, Japan	For WBA (Regular) light flyweight title
28	Loss	23–4–1	Kōki Kameda	SD	12	Aug 2, 2006	Yokohama Arena, Yokohama, Japan	For WBA (Regular) light flyweight title
27	Win	23–3–1	Walberto Ramos	UD	10	Dec 17, 2005	Centro Recreacional Yesterday, Turmero, Venezuela	
26	Win	22–3–1	Diego Tirado	KO	2 (10), 2:04	Sep 15, 2005	Circulo Militar, Maracay, Venezuela	
25	Win	21–3–1	Carlos Melo	UD	12	May 28, 2005	Bingo Avellaneda, Avellaneda, Argentina	WBA minimumweight title eliminator
24	Win	20–3–1	Gustavo Cortes	KO	1 (10), 2:58	Apr 9, 2005	Puerto Ordaz, Venezuela	
23	Loss	19–3–1	Yutaka Niida	SD	12	Oct 30, 2004	Kokugikan, Tokyo, Japan	For WBA (Regular) minimumweight title
22	Draw	19–2–1	Chana Porpaoin	SD	12	May 5, 2004	Rajadamnern Stadium, Bangkok, Thailand	Retained WBA Interim minimumweight title
21	Win	19–2	Chana Porpaoin	UD	12	Jan 31, 2004	Poliedro de Caracas, Caracas, Venezuela	Won WBA Interim minimumweight title
20	Win	18–2	Victoriano Hernandez	TKO	2 (?)	Nov 24, 2003	Gimnasio Don Jose Beracasa, Caracas, Venezuela	
19	Win	17–2	Jose Arroyo	TKO	1 (12)	Oct 17, 2003	Barinas City, Barinas, Venezuela	Won WBA Fedebol minimumweight title
18	Win	16–2	Luis Blanco	UD	10	May 28, 2003	Gimnasio Naciones Unidas, Caracas, Venezuela	
17	Win	15–2	Sofanor Recuero	KO	1 (?)	Nov 30, 2002	Caracas, Venezuela	
16	Loss	14–2	Noel Arambulet	UD	12	May 18, 2002	Centro Recreacional Yesterday, Turmero, Venezuela	For WBA Fedelatin minimumweight title and WBA minimumweight title eliminator
15	Win	14–1	Roger Guevara	TKO	1 (?)	Nov 3, 2001	Turmero, Venezuela	
14	Win	13–1	Francisco Capdevilla	TKO	6 (?)	Oct 29, 2001	Los Teques, Venezuela	
13	Win	12–1	Michael Arango	TKO	6 (?)	Jul 7, 2001	Turmero, Venezuela	
12	Win	11–1	Jairo Arango	TKO	6 (12), 2:25	Dec 16, 2000	Forum Bicentenario, Universisad Bicentenaria de Aragua, Maracay, Venezuela	Won WBA Fedelatin minimumweight
11	Win	10–1	Luis Blanco	PTS	10	Dec 5, 2000	Venezuela	
10	Win	9–1	Ever Paz	TKO	2 (?)	Sep 15, 2000	Turmero, Venezuela	
9	Win	8–1	Carlos Leon	TKO	1 (?)	Sep 2, 2000	Centro Recreacional Yesterday, Turmero, Venezuela	
8	Win	7–1	Jorge Salas	TKO	3 (?)	Aug 26, 2000	Galapa, Colombia	
7	Win	6–1	Hugo Diaz	TKO	2 (?)	Aug 5, 2000	Colombia	
6	Loss	5–1	Miguel Barrera	PTS	6	Jul 1, 2000	Maicao, Colombia	
5	Win	5–0	Juan Carlos Castillo	KO	2 (?)	Jun 17, 2000	Turmero, Venezuela	
4	Win	4–0	Fidel Gonzalez	KO	1 (?)	May 25, 2000	Maturín, Venezuela	
3	Win	3–0	Johnson Diaz	TKO	3 (?)	Apr 1, 2000	Cumaná, Venezuela	
2	Win	2–0	Edwin Madrid	KO	1 (?)	Mar 2, 2000	Turmero, Venezuela	
1	Win	1–0	Manuel Sequera	KO	1 (4)	Dec 7, 1999	Caracas, Venezuela	

Achievements
Vacant Title last held by Joma Gamboa	WBA minimumweight champion Interim Title; January 31, 2004 – October 30, 2004; Lost bid for full title	Vacant Title next held by Katsunari Takayama
