= Nungdiaw Sakcharuporn =

Thai boxer (born 1972)

Personal information
- Nationality: Thai
- Born: Sakorn Kemthong (สาคร เข็มทอง); 14 May 1972 (age 54) Ban Dan Makham Tia (now Dan Makham Tia district), Kanchanaburi province, Thailand
- Weight: Mini flyweight Light flyweight

Boxing career
- Stance: Southpaw

Boxing record
- Total fights: 19
- Wins: 17
- Win by KO: 9
- Losses: 2
- Draws: 0
- No contests: 0

Nungdiaw Sakcharuporn (Thai: หนึ่งเดียว ศักดิ์จารุพร, born 14 May 1972) is a retired Thai professional boxer who held the WBU light flyweight world champion in the 1990s.

== Biography and career ==
Sakcharuporn was born in Ban Dan Makham Tia, Kanchanaburi (currently promoted as Dan Makham Tia District), Kanchanaburi Province. He used to compete in Muay Thai under the name "Muangkan Buntasuwan" (เมืองกาญจน์ บันตะสุวรรณ) for 12 years before turning to a professional boxing career. He achieved a total of nine wins before challenging for the WBF mini flyweight title against Ronnie "Toy Bulldog" Magramo, a Filipino titleholder, at the parking lot in front of the Thansettakij building on Vibhavadi Rangsit Road, Chatuchak District, Bangkok; the result was a loss by split decision in early 1995.

Later, in the middle of the same year, he had another chance to challenge for a world title, this time the WBU light flyweight title, against Renardo Benonez, a Filipino boxer, at Channel 7's studio; the result was a win. Sakcharuporn defended his belt three times, including a victory over Josué Camacho from Puerto Rico.

He was eventually defeated by Mzukisi Sikali, a South African contender, in late 1996 at Villa Café on Rama IX Road, Huai Khwang District, Bangkok.
