= Rafael Torres (boxer) =

Dominican boxer (born 1966)

Personal information
- Nationality: Dominican
- Born: April 17, 1966 (age 60) Santiago de los Caballeros, Dominican Republic
- Weight: Mini flyweight; Light flyweight

Boxing career
- Stance: Southpaw

Boxing record
- Total fights: 25
- Wins: 16
- Win by KO: 3
- Losses: 9

Rafael Torres (born April 17, 1966), is a Dominican former professional boxer who competed from 1986 to 1999. He won the inaugural WBO minimumweight title in 1989.

== Professional career ==
Torres turned professional in 1986 & amassed a record of 9-0 before winning the inaugural WBO minimumweight title world title. He would go on to fight WBA champion Chana Porpaoin in 1993, losing via a fourth round stoppage. Torres would then move up in weight & unsuccessfully challenge South African Masibulele Makepula for the lightly regarded WBU title.

== Professional boxing record ==
25 fights	16 wins	9 losses
By knockout	3	4
By decision	12	5
By disqualification	1	0

No.	Result	Record	Opponent	Type	Round, time	Date	Location	Notes
25	Loss	16–9	Dimitri Kirilov	TKO	5 (8)	1999-11-01	Izegem, Belgium	
24	Win	16–8	Radames Bido	KO	2 (?)	1999-05-31	Santiago de los Caballeros, Dominican Republic	
23	Loss	15–8	Masibulele Makepula	TD	5 (12)	1998-09-22	The Theater at Madison Square Garden, New York City, U.S.	For vacant WBU Light flyweight title
22	Win	15–7	Ruddy Urbaez	TKO	8 (?)	1998-06-08	Santiago de los Caballeros, Dominican Republic	
21	Loss	14–7	Jesper D. Jensen	UD	8 (8)	1998-04-03	Holbaek stadionhal, Holbaek, Denmark	
20	Loss	14–6	Jose Rafael Sosa	TKO	4 (12)	1997-09-06	Club Atletico All Boys, Buenos Aires, Argentina	For WBO Latino flyweight title
19	Win	14–5	Plinio Miranda	TKO	7 (?)	1996-11-25	Santiago de los Caballeros, Dominican Republic	
18	Loss	13–5	Silvio Luzon	PTS	10 (10)	1996-10-11	Santo Domingo, Dominican Republic	
17	Loss	13–4	Sin Sor Ploenjit	PTS	12 (12)	1994-12-25	Provincial Stadium, Rayong, Thailand	
16	Win	13–3	Plinio Miranda	PTS	10 (10)	1994-11-25	Santo Domingo, Dominican Republic	
15	Loss	12–3	Rocky Lin	KO	3 (?)	1994-05-19	Korakuen Hall, Tokyo, Japan	
14	Loss	12–2	Chana Porpaoin	KO	4 (12)	1993-11-28	Provincial Stadium, Phichit, Thailand	For WBA Mini flyweight title
13	Loss	12–1	Jesús Rojas	UD	10 (10)	1992-12-12	Jai Alai Fronton, Miami, U.S.	
12	Win	12–0	Andres Tavarez	PTS	10 (10)	1992-06-15	Santiago de los Caballeros, Dominican Republic	
11	Win	11–0	Husni Ray	SD	12 (12)	1990-07-31	Bung Karno Stadium, Jakarta, Indonesia	Retained WBO Mini flyweight title
10	Win	10–0	Yamil Caraballo	UD	12 (12)	1989-08-30	Santo Domingo, Dominican Republic	Won vacant WBO Mini flyweight title
9	Win	9–0	Danny Nunez	PTS	10 (10)	1989-04-21	Puerto Plata, Dominican Republic	
8	Win	8–0	Rafael Ramos	PTS	10 (10)	1988-12-15	Santiago de los Caballeros, Dominican Republic	
7	Win	7–0	Felix Marti	PTS	12 (12)	1988-09-15	Santo Domingo, Dominican Republic	Won Dominican flyweight title
6	Win	6–0	Emilio Diaz	PTS	10 (10)	1988-04-30	La Vega, Dominican Republic	
5	Win	5–0	Julio Tejeda	DQ	3 (?)	1988-03-26	Santiago de los Caballeros, Dominican Republic	
4	Win	4–0	Rafael Ramos	PTS	8 (8)	1988-01-18	Puerto Plata, Dominican Republic	
3	Win	3–0	Bernardo Diaz	PTS	8 (8)	1987-11-16	Santiago de los Caballeros, Dominican Republic	
2	Win	2–0	Genaro Reyes	PTS	4 (4)	1986-08-11	Santiago de los Caballeros, Dominican Republic	
1	Win	1–0	Ramon Pena	PTS	4 (4)	1986-03-11	Santiago de los Caballeros, Dominican Republic	

== See also ==
- List of southpaw stance boxers
- List of world mini-flyweight boxing champions

Sporting positions
World boxing titles
Inaugural champion	WBO mini-flyweight champion August 30, 1989 – 1993; Vacated	Vacant Title next held by Paul Weir
