= Eduardo Ray Márquez =

Nicaraguan boxer

Personal information
- Nickname: El Faraon
- Born: Eduardo Ray Márquez López; February 5, 1976 (age 50) Managua, Nicaragua
- Height: 5 ft 3 1/2 in (161 cm)
- Weight: Mini flyweight; Light flyweight

Boxing career
- Reach: 66 in (168 cm)
- Stance: Orthodox

Boxing record
- Total fights: 30
- Wins: 18
- Win by KO: 13
- Losses: 9
- Draws: 1
- No contests: 2

Eduardo Ray Márquez López (born February 5, 1976) is a Nicaraguan former professional boxer who competed from 1996 to 2010. He held the WBO minimumweight title in 2003.

== Professional career ==
Marquez turned professional in 1996 & amassed a record of 17-5-1 (1 NC) before beating WBO minimumweight champion Jorge Mata & winning the world title. His reign would last less than six weeks before losing the title to Puerto Rican contender Iván Calderón.

== Professional boxing record ==
30 fights	18 wins	9 losses
By knockout	13	4
By decision	5	5
Draws	1	
No contests	2	

No.	Result	Record	Opponent	Type	Round, time	Date	Location	Notes
30	Loss	18–9–1 (2)	Elvis Guillen	TKO	2 (8)	2010-12-04	Gimnasio Alexis Arguello, Managua, Nicaragua	
29	Loss	18–8–1 (2)	Carlos Fajardo	TKO	3 (10)	2004-09-17	Pharaoh's Casino, Managua, Nicaragua	
28	Loss	18–7–1 (2)	Roberto Vásquez	TKO	2 (12)	2003-10-03	Roberto Durán Arena, Panama City, Panama	For WBC Latino light flyweight title
27	Loss	18–6–1 (2)	Iván Calderón	TD	9 (12)	May 3, 2003	Mandalay Bay Events Center, Paradise, Nevada, U.S.	Lost WBO mini flyweight title
26	Win	18–5–1 (2)	Jorge Mata	KO	11 (12)	2003-03-28	Raimundo Saporta Pavilion, Madrid, Spain	Won WBO mini flyweight title
25	Draw	17–5–1 (2)	Lee Sandoval	PTS	10 (10)	2002-10-19	Santa Ana, El Salvador	
24	Win	17–5 (2)	Jose Martinez	UD	10 (10)	2002-07-27	Gimnasio Alexis Arguello, Managua, Nicaragua	
23	Loss	16–5 (2)	Lee Sandoval	KO	10 (12)	2002-05-25	Gimnasio Alexis Arguello, Managua, Nicaragua	
22	Loss	16–4 (2)	Carlos Fajardo	UD	8 (8)	2002-02-23	Estudios del Canal 6, Managua, Nicaragua	
21	NC	16–3 (2)	Carlos Fajardo	NC	3 (8)	2001-12-15	Polideportivo Espana, Managua, Nicaragua	
20	Win	16–3 (1)	Pedro Blandon	KO	7 (10)	2001-08-11	Parque de Ferias Expica, Managua, Nicaragua	
19	Loss	15–3 (1)	Oscar Murillo	UD	10 (10)	2001-06-30	Managua, Nicaragua	
18	Win	15–2 (1)	Javier Medina	TKO	2 (10)	2001-01-13	Gimnasio Ajax Delgado, Managua, Nicaragua	
17	Win	14–2 (1)	Royers Vasquez	UD	10 (10)	2000-12-14	Managua, Nicaragua	
16	Win	13–2 (1)	Oscar Murillo	SD	10 (10)	2000-10-28	Gimnasio Alexis Arguello, Managua, Nicaragua	
15	Win	12–2 (1)	Vidal Cerna	UD	10 (10)	2000-03-30	Managua, Nicaragua	
14	Loss	11–2 (1)	Juan Francisco Centeno	SD	12 (12)	2000-03-11	Gimnasio Polideportivo Espana, Managua, Nicaragua	
13	Loss	11–1 (1)	Lee Sandoval	MD	12 (12)	1999-10-30	Gimnasio Alexis Arguello, Managua, Nicaragua	
12	Win	11–0 (1)	Royers Vasquez	TKO	11 (12)	1999-08-14	Managua, Nicaragua	
11	Win	10–0 (1)	Vidal Cerna	KO	3 (10)	1999-05-16	Gimnasio Alexis Arguello, Managua, Nicaragua	
10	Win	9–0 (1)	Leandro Mendoza	KO	9 (10)	1999-01-06	Managua, Nicaragua	
9	Win	8–0 (1)	Leandro Mendoza	KO	3 (6)	1998-09-14	Puerto Cabezas, Nicaragua	
8	Win	7–0 (1)	Lee Sandoval	TKO	6 (10)	1998-07-03	Gimnasio Alexis Arguello, Managua, Nicaragua	
7	Win	6–0 (1)	Ramon Estrada	TKO	7 (8)	1998-05-16	Gimnasio Alexis Arguello, Managua, Nicaragua	
6	Win	5–0 (1)	Pedro Ocon	TKO	4 (10)	1998-03-13	Managua, Nicaragua	
5	Win	4–0 (1)	Javier Medina	PTS	10 (10)	1998-01-31	Managua, Nicaragua	
4	Win	3–0 (1)	Ernesto Ruiz	TKO	2 (?)	1998-01-06	Managua, Nicaragua	
3	Win	2–0 (1)	Pedro Ocon	TKO	2 (?)	1997-11-28	Managua, Nicaragua	
2	Win	1–0 (1)	Carlos Lopez	TKO	5 (8)	1996-05-04	Juigalpa, Nicaragua	
1	NC	0–0 (1)	Oscar Guido	NC	6 (6)	1996-03-14	Leon, Nicaragua	

== See also ==
- List of world mini-flyweight boxing champions

Sporting positions
World boxing titles
Preceded by Jorge Mata	WBO mini-flyweight champion March 28, 2003 – May 3, 2003	Succeeded by Iván Calderón
