= Oscar De La Hoya vs. Yori Boy Campas =

Boxing match

Night of Champions
- Date: May 3, 2003
- Venue: Mandalay Bay Events Center, Paradise, Nevada, U.S.
- Title(s) on the line: WBA, WBC, IBA and The Ring super welterweight titles

Tale of the tape
Boxer	Oscar De La Hoya	Luis Ramón Campas
Nickname	The Golden Boy	Yori Boy
Hometown	East Los Angeles, California, U.S.	Navojoa, Sonora, Mexico
Purse	$11,000,000	$100,000
Pre-fight record	35–2 (27 KO)	80–5 (68 KO)
Age	30 years, 2 months	31 years, 8 months
Height	5 ft 11 in (180 cm)	5 ft 7 1/2 in (171 cm)
Weight	154 lb (70 kg)	153 1/2 lb (70 kg)
Style	Orthodox	Orthodox
Recognition	WBA, WBC, IBA and The Ring; Super Welterweight Champion; The Ring No. 4 ranked pound-for-pound fighter 4-division world champion	WBC; No. 15 Ranked Super Welterweight; Former IBF Light middleweight champion

Result
- De La Hoya wins via 7th-round technical knockout

Oscar De La Hoya vs. Yori Boy Campas, billed as Night of Champions, was a professional boxing match contested on May 3, 2003, for the WBA, WBC, IBA and The Ring super welterweight titles.

== Background ==
After defeating rival Fernando Vargas in September 2002 to become the unified WBA, WBC, Ring and lineal super welterweight champion, Oscar De La Hoya began negotiations to face Shane Mosley, who had issued De La Hoya his second defeat in a disputed split decision in 2000, in a rematch tentatively scheduled to take place in September 2003. Before facing Mosley, De La Hoya opted to take a tune-up bout against Yori Boy Campas during the weekend of Cinco de Mayo, agreeing to the fight in early January 2003.

Campas, who had held the IBF's version of the super welterweight title just over four years prior, was installed as a massive 25–1 underdog and given virtually no chance of defeating De La Hoya, with many who bet on the fight predicting he would not last more than six rounds. To drum up interest in the fight, Campas and promoter Bob Arum would concoct a bizarre story in which Campas claimed to have been given a potion supposedly used by Mexican forces prior to defeating the Second French Empire during the Battle of Puebla, which purportedly gave them, and subsequently Campas, enhanced strength and courage.

== The fights ==
=== Morales vs. Velárdez ===
In the co featured bout, WBC featherweight champion Erik Morales defended his title against No. 15 ranked Fernando Velárdez.

Morales knocked down Velardez in the 1st, 4th and 5th rounds when the fight was stopped without a count.

This was the Morales' final bout at featherweight. He would vacate the title in October, moving up to super featherweight.

=== Main Event ===
De La Hoya dominated Campas, landing 264 of 498 thrown punches for a success rate of 53% while Campas only landed 75 of his 348 thrown punches for a paltry 23% rate. While Campas was never knocked down, De La Hoya constantly punished Campas to the point that his face was red and swollen, causing his trainer to jump on ring apron late in the seventh round and ask referee Vic Drakulich to stop the fight. Drakulich obliged and stopped the fight at 2:54 of the round, giving De La Hoya the victory by technical knockout.

== Fight card ==
Confirmed bouts:

Weight Class	Weight		vs.		Method	Round	Notes
Super Welterweight	154 lbs.	Oscar De La Hoya (c)	def.	Yori Boy Campas	TKO	7/12	^{note 1}
Featherweight	126 lbs.	Erik Morales (c)	def.	Fernando Velárdez	TKO	5/12	^{note 2}
Light Flyweight	108 lbs.	Jorge Arce (c)	def.	Melchor Cob Castro	TD	6/12	^{note 3}
Mini Flyweight	105 lbs.	Iván Calderón	def.	Eduardo Ray Márquez (c)	TD	9/12	^{note 4}
Super Lightweight	140 lbs.	Cristian Bejarano	def.	Leroy Newton	TKO	1/6
Middleweight	160 lbs.	Patrick Thompson	def.	Jason Naugler	MD	4/4

^Note 1 For WBA, WBC, IBA and The Ring Super Welterweight titles
^Note 2 For WBC Featherweight title
^Note 3 For WBC Light Flyweight title
^Note 4 For WBO Mini Flyweight title

== Broadcasting ==
Country	Broadcaster
Australia	Main Event
United Kingdom	Sky Sports
United States	HBO

Preceded by vs. Fernando Vargas	Oscar De La Hoya's bouts 3 May 2003	Succeeded by vs. Shane Mosley II
Preceded by vs. George Klinesmith	Yori Boy Campas's bouts 3 May 2003	Succeeded by vs. Roni Martinez
