= Noel Arambulet =

Venezuelan boxer

Personal information
- Nickname: El Verdugo
- Born: Noel Arambulet; May 18, 1974 (age 52) Falcón, Venezuela
- Height: 5 ft 3 1/2 in (161 cm)
- Weight: Mini-flyweight; Light-flyweight

Boxing career
- Stance: Orthodox

Boxing record
- Total fights: 33
- Wins: 23
- Win by KO: 11
- Losses: 8
- Draws: 1
- No contests: 1

Noel Arambulet (born May 18, 1974, in Falcón, Venezuela) is a Venezuelan former professional boxer who competed from 1996 to 2008. He is a two-time World Boxing Association (WBA) minimumweight champion having held the title between 1999 and 2004.

== Professional career ==
Nicknamed "El Verdugo", Arambulet turned pro in 1996 and captured the vacant WBA minimumweight title with a decision win over Joma Gamboa in 1999. He defended the belt once before being stripped of the title for not making weight for a rematch against Gamboa in 2000. Gamboa won the fight and the title. He recaptured the WBA minimumweight title with a close decision win over Keitaro Hoshino in 2002. He defended the belt twice before losing it to Yutaka Niida in 2004 by decision, although, officially the title was stripped due to his failure to make weight.

== Professional boxing record ==
33 fights	23 wins	8 losses
By knockout	11	2
By decision	12	6
Draws	1	
No contests	1	

No.	Result	Record	Opponent	Type	Round, time	Date	Location	Notes
33	Loss	23–8–1 (1)	Luis Concepción	KO	1 (10), 2:59	28 Nov 2008	Atlapa Convention Centre, Panama City, Panama	For WBA Fedelatin flyweight title
32	Win	23–7–1 (1)	Elvis Garcia	UD	10	29 Sep 2007	Hotel Alba, Caracas, Venezuela	
31	Loss	22–7–1 (1)	Édgar Sosa	TD	10 (10)	2 Sep 2006	Karibe Convention Centre, Port-au-Prince, Haiti	
30	Loss	22–6–1 (1)	Roberto Vásquez	UD	12	20 May 2006	Atlapa Convention Centre, Panama City, Panama	For WBA light-flyweight title
29	Win	22–5–1 (1)	Darwin Zambrano	TKO	7 (10)	25 Feb 2006	Centro Recreacional Yesterday, Turmero, Venezuela	
28	Loss	21–5–1 (1)	Kōki Kameda	RTD	7 (10), 3:00	26 Nov 2005	Super Arena, Saitama, Japan	
27	Win	21–4–1 (1)	Alejandro Fidel Ordonez	UD	10	5 Mar 2005	Estadio Municipal, Coro, Venezuela	
26	Loss	20–4–1 (1)	Brahim Asloum	UD	12	8 Nov 2004	Palais Omnisports de Paris-Bercy, Paris, France	
25	Loss	20–3–1 (1)	Yutaka Niida	UD	12	3 Jul 2004	Korakuen Hall, Tokyo, Japan	
24	Win	20–2–1 (1)	Yutaka Niida	SD	12	12 Jul 2003	Pacifico, Yokohama, Japan	Retained WBA minimumweight title
23	Win	19–2–1 (1)	Keitaro Hoshino	MD	12	20 Dec 2002	Osaka-jō Hall, Osaka, Japan	Retained WBA minimumweight title
22	Win	18–2–1 (1)	Keitaro Hoshino	MD	12	29 Jul 2002	Pacifico, Yokohama, Japan	Won WBA minimumweight title
21	Win	17–2–1 (1)	Juan Jose Landaeta	UD	12	18 May 2002	Centro Recreacional Yesterday, Turmero, Venezuela	Won WBA Fedelatin minimumweight title
20	Win	16–2–1 (1)	Alfonso De la Hoz	PTS	10	21 Dec 2001	Turmero, Venezuela	
19	Win	15–2–1 (1)	Vidal Estrada	PTS	10	30 Jul 2001	Coro, Venezuela	
18	Win	14–2–1 (1)	Carlos Guerrero	TKO	7	5 May 2001	Caracas, Venezuela	
17	Win	13–2–1 (1)	Ever Paz	TKO	2	20 Mar 2001	Las Tejerias, Venezuela	
16	Loss	12–2–1 (1)	Joma Gamboa	SD	12	20 Aug 2000	Ryōgoku Kokugikan, Tokyo, Japan	
15	Win	12–1–1 (1)	Jose Garcia Bernal	UD	12	4 Mar 2000	Estadio Jose David Ugarte, Coro, Venezuela	Retained WBA minimumweight title
14	Win	11–1–1 (1)	Joma Gamboa	UD	12	9 Oct 1999	Parque Naciones Unidas, Caracas, Venezuela	Won vacant WBA minimumweight title
13	Loss	10–1–1 (1)	Jose Garcia Bernal	SD	12	10 Apr 1999	El Salon Country Club, Barranquilla, Colombia	For WBA Fedelatin minimumweight title
12	Win	10–0–1 (1)	Erlyn Romero	KO	5	19 Dec 1998	Petare, Venezuela	
11	Win	9–0–1 (1)	William De Sousa	PTS	12	3 Oct 1998	Gimnasio José Beracasa, Caracas, Venezuela	Won WBA Fedelatin light-flyweight title
10	Win	8–0–1 (1)	Ilson Diaz	KO	1	17 Aug 1998	Willemstad, Curaçao	
9	Win	7–0–1 (1)	Euclides Bolivar	KO	2	31 Jul 1998	Los Teques, Venezuela	
8	NC	6–0–1 (1)	Francisco Capdevilla	NC	1	23 Jun 1998	Las Tejerias, Venezuela	Reason for NC ruling not disclosed
7	Win	6–0–1	Euclides Bolivar	PTS	10	5 May 1998	Caracas, Venezuela	
6	Win	5–0–1	Jose Torres Pena	KO	1	14 Feb 1998	Caracas, Venezuela	
5	Win	4–0–1	Nestor Robaina	TKO	3	15 Dec 1997	Coro, Venezuela	
4	Win	3–0–1	Alexander Garcia	TKO	2	9 Dec 1997	Los Teques, Venezuela	
3	Win	2–0–1	Carlos Leon	TKO	2	29 Aug 1997	Carrizal, Venezuela	
2	Draw	1–0–1	Carlos Leon	PTS	4	17 May 1997	Los Teques, Venezuela	
1	Win	1–0	Erlyn Romero	TKO	4	18 Nov 1996	Coro, Venezuela	

== See also ==
- List of WBA world champions

Achievements
Vacant Title last held by Ricardo Lopez	WBA minimumweight champion October 9, 1999 – August 19, 2000; Stripped	Vacant Title next held by Joma Gamboa
Preceded by Keitaro Hoshino	WBA minimumweight champion July 29, 2002 – July 2, 2004; Stripped	Vacant Title next held by Yutaka Niida
