= Ala Villamor =

Filipino boxer (born 2000)

Personal information
- Nickname: Ala
- Nationality: Filipino
- Born: Edito Platero Villamor; 10 October 1970 (age 55) Davao del Sur, Mindanao, Philippines
- Height: 160 cm (5 ft 3 in)
- Weight: Mini-flyweight

Boxing career
- Stance: Southpaw

Boxing record
- Total fights: 32
- Wins: 29
- Win by KO: 26
- Losses: 2
- Draws: 1

Edito "Ala" Villamor (born October 10, 1970) is a Filipino former professional boxer. Competing from 1989 to 1996, he challenged twice for mini-flyweight world championships; the IBF title in 1993 and the WBC title in 1996.

== Biography and career ==
Villamor turned professional in 1989 along with his contemporaries were Andy Tabanas, Gerry Peñalosa, Rey Cosep and the Alfante brothers. He held the Philippines mini flyweight champion between 1990 and 1993, with never been defeated, by defeating many skilled boxers were Nico Thomas, Napa Kiatwanchai, Ronnie Magramo. During that time he was regarded as the rising star Filipino boxer who had hopes of becoming a future world champion.

He had the opportunity to challenge the world champion for the first time with Thailand's Ratanapol Sor Vorapin, the IBF mini flyweight title holder on June 27, 1993, at Nimibutr Stadium, National Stadium, Bangkok, Thailand. He lost TKO in the seventh round, Sor Vorapin retained title for the second time, Villamor suffered his first defeat.

Villamor had the opportunity to challenge for world title for the second time with the WBC strawweight champion the undefeated Mexican Ricardo López on March 16, 1996, at MGM Grand Garden Arena, Paradise, Nevada, U.S. As a result, he lost TKO in the early eighth round with López's left uppercut. Villamor retired after this bout.

He worked as a trainer and matchmaker of ALA Promotions, a major boxing promotions company in the Philippines.

== Professional boxing record ==
32 fights	29 wins	2 losses
By knockout	26	2
By decision	3	0
Draws	1	

No.	Result	Record	Opponent	Type	Round, Time	Date	Location	Notes
32	Loss	29–2–1	Ricardo López	KO	8 (12) 0:40	16 Mar 1996	MGM Grand, Las Vegas, U.S.A.	For WBC minimumweight title
31	Win	29–1–1	Noknoi Surthanikul	KO	3 (10)	24 Jun 1995	Cebu Coliseum, Cebu City, Philippines	
30	Win	28–1–1	Orlando Malone	UD	10	11 Mar 1995	Cebu Coliseum, Cebu City, Philippines	
29	Win	27–1–1	Hang Kyu Jang	KO	8 (?)	14 Nov 1994	Tokyo, Japan	
28	Win	26–1–1	Kid Nanz	TKO	3 (?)	11 Nov 1994	Ozamiz City, Misamis Occidental, Philippines	
27	Win	25–1–1	Chris Galon	TKO	3 (?)	14 Aug 1994	Bogo, Cebu, Philippines	
26	Loss	24–1–1	Ratanapol Sor Vorapin	TKO	7 (12) 2:01	27 Jun 1993	National Stadium Gymnasium, Bangkok, Thailand	For IBF minimumweight title
25	Win	24–0–1	Texas Gomez	KO	2 (12) 2:24	2 Feb 1993	Cuneta Astrodome, Pasay City, Philippines	Retained Philippine Games & Amusements Board(GAB) Filipino minimumweight title
24	Win	23–0–1	Napa Kiatwanchai	KO	2 (?)	20 Nov 1992	Metropolitan Gym, Tokyo, Japan	
23	Win	22–0–1	Ronnie Magramo	KO	8 (12)	13 Jun 1992	Cebu Coliseum, Cebu City, Philippines	Retained Philippines Games & Amusements Board(GAB) Filipino minimumweight title
22	Win	21–0–1	Jae Won Kim	KO	1 (?)	4 Apr 1992	Cebu, Philippines	
21	Win	20–0–1	Said Iskandar	TKO	3 (10) 1:24	11 Jan 1992	Cebu City, Cebu, Philippines	
20	Draw	19–0–1	Yuichi Hosono	SD	10	14 Oct 1991	Tokyo, Japan	
19	Win	19–0	Sugar Ray Mike	TKO	8 (12)	17 Aug 1991	Cebu City, Cebu, Philippines	Retained Philippines Games & Amusements Board(GAB) Filipino minimumweight title
18	Win	18–0	Armando Tenoria	KO	4 (10)	8 Jul 1991	Tokyo, Japan	
17	Win	17–0	In Kyu Hwang	PTS	10	13 Apr 1991	Cebu City, Cebu, Philippines	
16	Win	16–0	Yasuo Yogi	KO	9 (10) 0:59	10 Dec 1990	Korakuen Hall, Tokyo, Japan	
15	Win	15–0	Rico Macaubos	TKO	5 (13) 1:47	17 Nov 1990	Cebu Coliseum, Cebu City, Philippines	Won vacant Philippines Games & Amusements Board(GAB) Filipino minimumweight title
14	Win	14–0	Nico Thomas	KO	2 (10) 2:54	29 Sep 1990	Cebu Coliseum, Cebu City, Philippones	
13	Win	13–0	Hae Suk Kwon	KO	2 (?)	13 Aug 1990	Tokyo, Japan	
12	Win	12–0	Ded Donjadee	TKO	3 (10) 1:42	30 Jun 1990	Cebu Coliseum, Cebu City, Philippines	
11	Win	11–0	William Mohammed Alip	KO	3 (?)	26 May 1990	Mandaue City, Cebu, Philippines	
10	Win	10–0	Ponidi	TKO	9 (?)	31 Mar 1990	Cebu City, Cebu, Philippines	
9	Win	9–0	Max Forrosuelo	TKO	8 (?)	13 Jan 1990	Cebu City, Cebu, Philippines	
8	Win	8–0	Jonas Torregoza	TKO	6 (?)	22 Dec 1989	Cebu City, Cebu, Philippines	
7	Win	7–0	Janni Javis	TKO	5 (?) 1:15	11 Nob 1989	Cebu Coliseum, Cebu City, Philippines	
6	Win	6–0	Beuk Soo Kim	KO	3 (?)	14 Oct 1989	Hong Kong S.A.R., China(Formerly/During the Time)	
5	Win	5–0	Rady Pascudan	TKO	2 (?)	29 Sep 1989	Cebu Coliseum, Cebu City, Philippines	
4	Win	4–0	Boy Dianorla	TKO	2 (?)	19 Aug 1989	Cebu Coliseum, Cebu City, Philippines	
3	Win	3–0	Ronnie Magramo	PTS	6	4 Aug 1989	Ninoy Aquino Stadium, District of Malate, Manila, Philippines	
2	Win	2–0	Boy Ortega	KO	2 (6) 1:45	15 Jul 1989	Tanjay City, Negros Oriental, Philippines	
1	Win	1–0	Jun Mendoza	TKO	6 (6)	3 Jun 1989	Tanjay City, Negros Oriental, Philippines	Professional Debut
