= Songkram Porpaoin =

Thai boxer and Muay Thai fighter (born 1966)

Songkram Por.Paoin
- Born: Manatsanun Motma; Kam Motma (formerly); March 25, 1966 (age 60); Tambon Ban Klang, Lom Sak district, Phetchabun province, Thailand
- Other names: Songkram Por.Paoin
- Height: 160 cm (5 ft 3 in)
- Division: Minimumweight
- Style: Muay Thai, Boxing
- Stance: Orthodox
- Fighting out of: Phetchabun province, Thailand

Professional boxing record
- Total: 30
- Wins: 23
- By knockout: 12
- Losses: 5
- Draws: 2

Other information
- Notable relatives: Chana Porpaoin (twin brother)
- Boxing record from BoxRec

Songkram Porpaoin (Thai: สงคราม ป.เปาอินทร์; born 25 March 1966) is a retired professional Minimumweight boxer and Muay Thai fighter from Thailand.

== Biography and career ==
Songkram, whose real name is Manatsanun Motma (มนัสนันท์ หมดมา; formerly Kam Motma; ค้ำ หมดมา; personal nickname: Tho; โท), was born in Lom Sak district, Phetchabun province.

Before turning professional in boxing, he practiced Muay Thai in the northern region of his native area under the name Kongla Sakchainarong (ก้องหล้า ศักดิ์ชัยณรงค์), while his brother Chana used the name Lomnuea Sakchainarong (ลมเหนือ ศักดิ์ชัยณรงค์). Songkram was a five time Rajadamnern Stadium 105 lbs champion.

When his twin brother Chana Porpaoin won the world championship, their manager, Niwat "Chae-mae" Laosuwanwat of Galaxy Boxing Promotion, hoped Songkram would become the second twin world champion after the Galaxy brothers Khaosai and Khaokor Galaxy in the 1980s. The twins' professional ring names, "Chana and Songkram", meaning "winning the war," came from their supporter Prachuap Pao-in, who at that time was an investigative inspector at the Chana Songkram Metropolitan Police Station located in the Bang Lamphu near Khaosan road.

After Chana lost the world title to Rosendo Álvarez, a boxer from Nicaragua, at the end of 1995, Songkram was supported to challenge Álvarez on January 11, 1997, in Sa Kaeo province but was TKOed in the 11th round. However, later that year, he won the PABA Minimumweight title by defeating his old rival, Randy Mangubat, a Filipino boxer with whom he had previously drawn, winning by points. He defended the title once.

Prior to that, in 1995, he was contacted as a challenger for the WBC and IBF Light Flyweight world titles held by Humberto González, a Mexican boxer, but his manager Niwat Laosuwanwat declined because Niwat was known for cooperating only with the WBA. Consequently, González’s challenger became Saman Sorjaturong.

On January 30, 1999, he challenged for the WBA Minimumweight interim title against Ronnie "Toy Bulldog" Magramo, a Filipino contender, in Pattaya. Although he was knocked down in the third round, he won by a close majority technical decision (75–75, 78–73, 76–74) in the eighth round after his head was bleeding from a headbutt and he could not continue fighting.

However, four months later, he traveled to Japan to fight Hiroshi Matsumoto, a Japanese boxer. The match ended with a WBA disallowed decision, and Songkram was eventually stripped of the title.

After retirement, Songkram's life became very difficult, and his wife separated from him. He has been ordained twice. Today, he makes a living by teaching full-time at POM Gym in Bangkok, Thailand.

== Titles and accomplishments ==
=== Muay Thai ===
- Rajadamnern Stadium
  - 1989 Rajadamnern Stadium Mini Flyweight (105 lbs) Champion
    - Two successful title defenses
  - 1990 Rajadamnern Stadium Mini Flyweight (105 lbs) Champion
    - One successful title defense
  - 1990 Rajadamnern Stadium Mini Flyweight (105 lbs) Champion
  - 1991 Rajadamnern Stadium Mini Flyweight (105 lbs) Champion
    - Four successful title defenses
  - 1992 Rajadamnern Stadium Mini Flyweight (105 lbs) Champion
    - One successful title defense

== Muay Thai record ==
Muay Thai Record
Date	Result	Opponent	Event	Location	Method	Round	Time
1992-09-28	Win	(Thailand) Wiratnoi Singchachawan	Palangnum, Rajadamnern Stadium	Bangkok, Thailand	Decision (Unanimous)	5	3:00
Defends the Rajadamnern Stadium Mini Flyweight (105 lbs) title.
1992-07-29	Win	(Thailand) Saksri Yutthakit	Rajadamnern Stadium	Bangkok, Thailand	KO	1	
Wins the Rajadamnern Stadium Mini Flyweight (105 lbs) title.
1992-02-19	Loss	(Thailand) Saksri Yutthakit	Rajadamnern Stadium	Bangkok, Thailand	Decision	5	3:00
Loses the Rajadamnern Stadium Mini Flyweight (105 lbs) title.
1991-	Win	(Thailand) Khamson Sor.Worapin	Rajadamnern Stadium	Bangkok, Thailand	Decision	5	3:00
Defends the Rajadamnern Stadium Mini Flyweight (105 lbs) title.
1991-11-13	Win	(Thailand) Chetha Majestic	Rajadamnern Stadium	Bangkok, Thailand	Decision (Split)	5	3:00
Defends the Rajadamnern Stadium Mini Flyweight (105 lbs) title.
1991-07-17	Win	(Thailand) Jery Laothaicharoen	Rajadamnern Stadium	Bangkok, Thailand	TKO	2	
1991-06-17	Win	(Thailand) Jery Laothaicharoen	Phettongkam, Rajadamnern Stadium	Bangkok, Thailand	Decision (Unanimous)	5	3:00
Defends the Rajadamnern Stadium Mini Flyweight (105 lbs) title.
1991-	Win	(Thailand) Denweha Sitkruphat	Phettongkam, Rajadamnern Stadium	Bangkok, Thailand	Decision	5	3:00
Defends the Rajadamnern Stadium Mini Flyweight (105 lbs) title.
1991-01-30	Win	(Thailand) Khomsan Saknarin	Wan Muay Thai, Rajadamnern Stadium	Bangkok, Thailand	KO (Punch)	4	
Wins the Rajadamnern Stadium Mini Flyweight (105 lbs) title.
1990-12-09	Loss	(Thailand) Khomsan Saknarin	Rajadamnern Stadium	Bangkok, Thailand	Decision	5	3:00
Loses the Rajadamnern Stadium Mini Flyweight (105 lbs) title.
1990-11-14	Win	(Thailand) Yokphet Lukphrabat	Rajadamnern Stadium	Bangkok, Thailand	Decision	5	3:00
Wins the vacant Rajadamnern Stadium Mini Flyweight (105 lbs) title.
1990-10-10	Win	(Thailand) Apichat Por.Thawatchai	Rajadamnern Stadium	Bangkok, Thailand	KO (Punch)	3	
1990-08-15	Loss	(Thailand) Khaimuktae Sitkuanyim	Fahlan Sakkreerin vs Eric Chavez, Rajadamnern Stadium	Bangkok, Thailand	Decision	5	3:00
For the Rajadamnern Stadium Mini Flyweight (105 lbs) title.
1990-06-30	Loss	(Thailand) Khaimuktae Sitkuanyim	Kaosai Galaxy vs Shunichi Nakajima, Rajadamnern Stadium	Bangkok, Thailand	Decision	5	3:00
Lost the Rajadamnern Stadium Mini Flyweight (105 lbs) title.
1990-03-29	Win	(Thailand) Chuchai Kiatchansing	Palangnum, Rajadamnern Stadium	Bangkok, Thailand	Decision	5	3:00
Defends the Rajadamnern Stadium Mini Flyweight (105 lbs) title.
1990-02-11	Win	(Thailand) Deenueng Thor.Pattanakit	Rajadamnern Stadium	Bangkok, Thailand	Decision	5	3:00
Wins the vacant Rajadamnern Stadium Mini Flyweight (105 lbs) title.
1989-09-27	Loss	(Thailand) Robert Kaennorasing	Rajadamnern Stadium	Bangkok, Thailand	Decision	5	3:00
Loses the Rajadamnern Stadium Mini Flyweight (105 lbs) title.
1989-07-27	Win	(Thailand) Khamron Sor.Worapin	Mumnamgoen, Rajadamnern Stadium	Bangkok, Thailand	Decision	5	3:00
Defends Rajadamnern Stadium Mini Flyweight (105 lbs) title.
1989-07-09	Win	(Thailand) Haruhod Saktawee	Rajadamnern Stadium	Bangkok, Thailand	KO	2	
Defends Rajadamnern Stadium Mini Flyweight (105 lbs) title.
1989-06-05	Win	(Thailand) Saksri Yutthakit	Palangnum, Rajadamnern Stadium	Bangkok, Thailand	Decision (Unanimous)	5	3:00
Wins the vacant Rajadamnern Stadium Mini Flyweight (105 lbs) title.
1989-04-24	Win	(Thailand) Namkhon RatchaphruekCafe	Palangnum, Rajadamnern Stadium	Bangkok, Thailand	KO	3	
1989-03-	Win	(Thailand) Akaradet Kiatpayathai	Rajadamnern Stadium	Bangkok, Thailand	Decision	5	3:00
1989-01-18	Win	(Thailand) Saksri Yutthakit	Wan Muay Thai, Rajadamnern Stadium	Bangkok, Thailand	Decision	5	3:00
1988-03-16	Win	(Thailand) Paidaeng Devy	Palangnum, Rajadamnern Stadium	Bangkok, Thailand	Decision	5	3:00
1988-02-10	Loss	(Thailand) Saksri Yutthakit	Palangnum, Rajadamnern Stadium	Bangkok, Thailand	Decision	5	3:00
1987-11-19	Loss	(Thailand) Saksri Yutthakit	Mumnamgoen, Rajadamnern Stadium	Bangkok, Thailand	Decision	5	3:00
1987-10-05	Win	(Thailand) Duangjai Sitsae	Wan Muay Thai, Rajadamnern Stadium	Bangkok, Thailand	Decision	5	3:00
1987-04-27	Win	(Thailand) Petchchok Sit-Amphon	Phettongkam, Rajadamnern Stadium	Bangkok, Thailand	KO	3	
Legend: Win Loss Draw/No contest Notes

== Professional boxing record ==
30 fights	23 wins	5 losses
By knockout	11	1
By decision	11	4
By disqualification	1	0
Draws	2	

No.	Result	Record	Opponent	Type	Round, time	Date	Location	Notes
30	Loss	23–5–2	Katsunari Takayama	MD	8	14 Oct 2002	Korakuen Hall, Tokyo, Japan	
29	Draw	23–4–2	Wendil Cajoles	TD	3 (6)	24 May 2002	Nakhon Pathom, Thailand	
28	Win	23–4–1	Wicha Phulaikhao	KO	5	13 Feb 2002	Bangkok, Thailand	
27	Loss	22–4–1	Satoshi Kogumazaka	UD	10	24 Sep 2001	Yokohama Arena, Yokohama, Japan	
26	Loss	22–3–1	Noel Tunacao	UD	10	31 Aug 2001	Antipolo, Philippines	
25	Win	22–2–1	Tatsuo Hayashida	KO	6 (10), 2:37	21 Jun 2001	Korakuen Hall, Tokyo, Japan	
24	Win	21–2–1	John Paul Perez	PTS	10	30 Apr 2001	Phayuha Khiri, Thailand	
23	Loss	20–2–1	Hiroshi Matsumoto	UD	10	16 May 1999	Kitakyushu, Japan	
22	Win	20–1–1	Ronnie Magramo	TD	8 (12)	30 Jan 1999	Pattaya City Hall, Pattaya, Thailand	Won WBA interim minimumweight title
21	Win	19–1–1	Rudolfo Fernandez	UD	12	2 Oct 1998	Bangkok, Thailand	Retained PABA minimumweight title
20	Win	18–1–1	Reggie Palabrica	UD	12	12 Jun 1998	Ang Thong, Thailand	Retained PABA minimumweight title
19	Win	17–1–1	Randy Mangubat	TD	5 (12)	21 Dec 1997	Phraram 9 Plaza, Bangkok, Thailand	Won PABA minimumweight title
18	Draw	16–1–1	Randy Mangubat	TD	5 (12)	7 Sep 1997	Niran Condotel, Bangkok, Thailand	For PABA minimumweight title
17	Loss	16–1	Rosendo Álvarez	TKO	11 (12), 2:14	11 Jan 1997	Provincial Gymnasium, Sa Kaeo, Thailand	For WBA minimumweight title
16	Win	16–0	Jaime Aliguin	PTS	10	17 Aug 1996	Saksit Restaurant, Bangkok, Thailand	
15	Win	15–0	Ramil Gevero	KO	7 (10)	22 Jun 1996	Phraram 9 Plaza, Bangkok, Thailand	
14	Win	14–0	Al Tarazona	KO	1 (8)	23 Mar 1996	PATA Shopping Center, Bangkok, Thailand	
13	Win	13–0	Rolando Tadle	KO	6	31 Jan 1996	Bangkok, Thailand	
12	Win	12–0	Christopher Saguid	PTS	10	6 Aug 1995	Rajadamnern Stadium, Bangkok, Thailand	
11	Win	11–0	Edwin Talita	TKO	8 (10)	28 Jan 1995	National Stadium Gymnasium, Bangkok, Thailand	
10	Win	10–0	Manny Melchor	UD	10	5 Nov 1994	Chira Nakhon Stadium, Hat Yai, Thailand	
9	Win	9–0	Meky Mbatu	KO	3	1 Oct 1994	Channel 7 Studios, Bangkok, Thailand	
8	Win	8–0	Alpong Navaja	PTS	10	3 Sep 1994	City Sports Ground Arena, Phatthalung, Thailand	
7	Win	7–0	Jerry Pahayahay	UD	10	4 Mar 1994	Bangkok, Thailand	
6	Win	6–0	Ernesto Rubillar	UD	10	28 Nov 1993	Phichit Provincial Stadium, Phichit, Thailand	
5	Win	5–0	Roger Gamayot	KO	2	27 Oct 1993	Bangkok, Thailand	
4	Win	4–0	Agus Ray	KO	5	26 Sep 1993	Indoor Stadium Huamark, Bangkok, Thailand	
3	Win	3–0	Park Sang-ho	DQ	5	22 Aug 1993	Saraburi Stadium, Saraburi, Thailand	
2	Win	2–0	Rommel Lawas	KO	3	27 Jun 1993	National Stadium Gymnasium, Bangkok, Thailand	
1	Win	1–0	Hideo Suzuki	KO	3	9 May 1993	Physical Education Center, Ang Thong, Thailand	

Achievements
New title	WBA minimumweight champion Interim Title; January 30, 1999 – May 1999; Stripped	Vacant Title next held by Joma Gamboa
