= Chana Porpaoin =

Thai boxer

Personal information
- Born: Koon Motma; 25 March 1966 (age 60) Tambon Ban Klang, Lom Sak District, Phetchabun Province, Thailand
- Height: 160 cm (5 ft 3 in)
- Weight: Minimumweight

Boxing career
- Stance: Orthodox

Boxing record
- Total fights: 62
- Wins: 53
- Win by KO: 19
- Losses: 4
- Draws: 5
- No contests: 0

Chana Porpaoin (Thai: ชนะ ป.เปาอินทร์; born 1966-03-25 in Lom Sak district, Phetchabun province, Thailand) is a Thai boxer. Chana and his younger brother, Songkram Porpaoin, became only the second set of twins to both capture world titles, with the Galaxy twins, also from Thailand, being the first.

The twins' professional ring name, "Chana-Songkram," meaning "winning the war," comes from their supporter Prachuap Pao-in, who at that time was an investigative inspector at the Chana Songkram Metropolitan Police Station, located in the Bang Lamphu near Khaosan Road.

== Professional career ==
Chana's real name is Koon Motma (คูณ หมดมา; personal nickname: Thid; ถิด). He started boxing through Muay Thai under the name "Lomnuea Sakchainarong," (ลมเหนือ ศักดิ์ชัยณรงค์) regularly fighting at Rajadamnern Stadium and winning the mini-flyweight championship in 1988.

He turned professional in May 1988 under Niwat "Chae-mae" Laosuwanwat of Galaxy Boxing Promotion and captured the World Boxing Association (WBA) minimumweight title with a majority decision win over Hideyuki Ohashi in early 1993 at Tokyo Metropolitan Gymnasium, Tokyo, Japan. He defended the title against eight fighters before losing it to Rosendo Álvarez in late 1995 by split decision at Sa Kaeo province, Thailand.

He recaptured the belt in 2001 with a win over Keitaro Hoshino, but lost it in his first defense to Yutaka Niida.

In 2004, he challenged twice for the WBA interim minimumweight title against Juan Jose Landaeta but was unsuccessful, including one draw.

== Retirement ==
He retired along with his brother Songkram. After retirement, he opened a rice shop in Bang Yai district, Nonthaburi province.

Chana is currently the owner of a Muay Thai gym named Chaosingkhon (จ้าวสิงห์ขร) in Pho Thale district, Phichit province. After many careers, he has trained many local youths to become professional Muay Thai kickboxers, helping them give up their mischievous teenage behavior.

== Professional boxing record ==
| 62 fights | 53 wins | 4 losses |
|---|---|---|
| By knockout | 19 | 0 |
| By decision | 34 | 4 |
| Draws | 5 | |

| No. | Result | Record | Opponent | Type | Round, Time | Date | Location | Notes |
|---|---|---|---|---|---|---|---|---|
| 62 | Draw | 53–4–5 | (Japan) Katsuhiko Iezumi | SD | 10 | 11 Dec 2006 | Korakuen Hall, Tokyo, Japan | |
| 61 | Loss | 53–4–4 | (Japan) Junichiro Kaneda | TD | 5 (10), 2:42 | 14 Jul 2005 | Korakuen Hall, Tokyo, Japan | Split TD |
| 60 | Draw | 53–3–4 | (Philippines) Rocky Fuentes | PTS | 6 | 15 Mar 2005 | Srithep District, Petchaboon, Thailand | |
| 59 | Win | 53–3–3 | (Philippines) Philip Parcon | UD | 6 | 7 Dec 2004 | Bangkok, Thailand | |
| 58 | Win | 52–3–3 | (Japan) Ken Nakajima | UD | 6 | 11 Oct 2004 | Yala, Thailand | |
| 57 | Draw | 51–3–3 | (Venezuela) Juan Jose Landaeta | SD | 12 | 5 May 2004 | Rajadamnern Stadium, Bangkok, Thailand | For WBA Interim minimumweight title |
| 56 | Loss | 51–3–2 | (Venezuela) Juan Jose Landaeta | UD | 12 | 31 Jan 2004 | El Poliedro, Caracas, Venezuela | For WBA Interim minimumweight title |
| 55 | Win | 51–2–2 | (Philippines) Arman Defensor | UD | 6 | 23 Dec 2003 | Nakhon Sawan, Thailand | |
| 54 | Win | 50–2–2 | (Philippines) Emer Barrientos | KO | 3 (6) | 29 Aug 2003 | Khon Kaen, Thailand | |
| 53 | Win | 49–2–2 | (Indonesia) Denni Ririmase | UD | 6 | 12 Feb 2003 | Phayukha Khiri, Thailand | |
| 52 | Win | 48–2–2 | (Philippines) Wendil Cajoles | UD | 6 | 20 Aug 2002 | Bangkok, Thailand | |
| 51 | Win | 47–2–2 | (Philippines) Rolando Baclayo | UD | 6 | 28 Apr 2002 | Bangkok, Thailand | |
| 50 | Win | 46–2–2 | (Philippines) Jack Comen | KO | 6 (?) | 13 Feb 2002 | Bangkok, Thailand | |
| 49 | Win | 45–2–2 | (Philippines) Julius Agcopra | UD | 6 | 12 Dec 2001 | Chiang Mai, Thailand | |
| 48 | Loss | 44–2–2 | (Japan) Yutaka Niida | UD | 12 | 25 Aug 2001 | Pacifico, Yokohama, Japan | Lost WBA minimumweight title |
| 47 | Win | 44–1–2 | (Japan) Keitaro Hoshino | SD | 12 | 16 Apr 2001 | Pacifico, Yokohama, Japan | Won WBA minimumweight title |
| 46 | Win | 43–1–2 | (Indonesia) Denni Ririmase | PTS | 6 | 24 Jan 2001 | Bangkok, Thailand | |
| 45 | Draw | 42–1–2 | (Philippines) Ernesto Rubillar | TD | 8 (8) | 19 Oct 2000 | Ratchaburi, Thailand | |
| 44 | Win | 42–1–1 | (Thailand) Tiger Kiatniwat | KO | 4 (?) | 1 Sep 2000 | Bangkok, Thailand | |
| 43 | Win | 41–1–1 | (Philippines) Jerry Rosales | TD | 1 (?) | 17 Dec 1999 | Bangkok, Thailand | |
| 42 | Win | 40–1–1 | (Japan) Keisuke Yokoyama | PTS | 10 | 25 Aug 1999 | Tokyo, Japan | |
| 41 | Win | 39–1–1 | (Philippines) Jerry Rosales | TKO | 5 (?) | 18 Jun 1999 | Samut Prakan, Thailand | |
| 40 | Win | 38–1–1 | (Thailand) Lloyd Drawcar | PTS | 10 | 12 Mar 1999 | Chiang Mai, Thailand | |
| 39 | Win | 37–1–1 | (Philippines) Lolito Laroa | PTS | 8 | 28 Aug 1998 | Ratchaburi, Thailand | |
| 38 | Win | 36–1–1 | (Philippines) Alpong Navaja | TKO | 3 (10) | 11 Jan 1997 | Provincial Gymnasium, Sa Kaeo, Thailand | |
| 37 | Draw | 35–1–1 | (Philippines) Jerry Pahayahay | SD | 10 | 23 Mar 1996 | PATA Shopping Center, Huamark, Bangkok, Thailand | |
| 36 | Loss | 35–1 | (Nicaragua) Rosendo Álvarez | SD | 12 | 2 Dec 1995 | Provincial Gymnasium, Sa Kaeo, Thailand | Lost WBA minimumweight title |
| 35 | Win | 35–0 | (Philippines) Ernesto Rubillar | KO | 6 (12), 1:26 | 6 Aug 1995 | Rajadamnern Stadium, Bangkok, Thailand | Retained WBA minimumweight title |
| 34 | Win | 34–0 | (South Korea) Jin Ho Kim | UD | 12 | 28 Jan 1995 | National Stadium Gymnasium, Bangkok, Thailand | Retained WBA minimumweight title |
| 33 | Win | 33–0 | (Dominican Republic) Manuel Jesus Herrera | SD | 12 | 5 Nov 1994 | Chira Nakorn Stadium, Hat Yai, Thailand | Retained WBA minimumweight title |
| 32 | Win | 32–0 | (South Korea) Keum Young Kang | UD | 12 | 3 Sep 1994 | City Sports Ground Arena, Phatthalung, Thailand | Retained WBA minimumweight title |
| 31 | Win | 31–0 | (Panama) Carlos Murillo | MD | 12 | 26 Mar 1994 | Physical Education College, Chonburi, Thailand | Retained WBA minimumweight title |
| 30 | Win | 30–0 | (Dominican Republic) Rafael Torres | KO | 4 (12), 1:42 | 29 Nov 1993 | Provincial Stadium, Phichit, Thailand | Retained WBA minimumweight title |
| 29 | Win | 29–0 | (Philippines) Ronnie Magramo | UD | 12 | 22 Aug 1993 | Provincial Stadium, Sara Buri, Thailand | Retained WBA minimumweight title |
| 28 | Win | 28–0 | (Panama) Carlos Murillo | UD | 12 | 9 May 1993 | Physical Education Center, Ang Thong, Thailand | Retained WBA minimumweight title |
| 27 | Win | 27–0 | (Japan) Hideyuki Ohashi | MD | 12 | 10 Feb 1993 | Metropolitan Gym, Tokyo, Japan | Won WBA minimumweight title |
| 26 | Win | 26–0 | (Philippines) Ernesto Rubillar | KO | 4 (?) | 10 Dec 1992 | National Stadium Gymnasium, Bangkok, Thailand | |
| 25 | Win | 25–0 | (Philippines) Texas Gomez | TKO | 6 (?) | 3 Nov 1992 | Bangkok, Thailand | |
| 24 | Win | 24–0 | (Philippines) Al Tarazona | PTS | 10 | 21 Jun 1992 | Bangkok, Thailand | |
| 23 | Win | 23–0 | (Philippines) Armando Tenoria | PTS | 10 | 22 Dec 1991 | National Stadium of Thailand (Thephasadin Section), Bangkok, Thailand | |
| 22 | Win | 22–0 | (South Korea) Jung Il Koh | PTS | 10 | 13 Nov 1991 | Bangkok, Thailand | |
| 21 | Win | 21–0 | (Philippines) Ric Magramo | PTS | 10 | 20 Jul 1991 | Crocodile Farm, Samut Prakan, Thailand | |
| 20 | Win | 20–0 | (Philippines) Nilo Anosa | PTS | 10 | 29 May 1991 | Bangkok, Thailand | |
| 19 | Win | 19–0 | (Mexico) Guillermo Flores | PTS | 10 | 20 Feb 1991 | Bangkok, Thailand | |
| 18 | Win | 18–0 | (Philippines) Nikki Maca | UD | 10 | 9 Dec 1990 | Provincial Stadium, Petchaboon, Thailand | |
| 17 | Win | 17–0 | (Philippines) John Medina | KO | 2 (?) | 29 Sep 1990 | Provincial Stadium, Suphan Buri, Thailand | |
| 16 | Win | 16–0 | (Philippines) Manny Melchor | PTS | 10 | 30 Jun 1990 | Municipality Gym, Chiang Mai, Thailand | |
| 15 | Win | 15–0 | (South Korea) Joon Bum Koh | TKO | 3 (?) | 22 Feb 1990 | Rajadamnern Stadium, Bangkok, Thailand | |
| 14 | Win | 14–0 | (Philippines) Sammy Tyson Pagadan | PTS | 10 | 17 Dec 1989 | Bangkok, Thailand | |
| 13 | Win | 13–0 | (Thailand) Silvino Jimenez | TKO | 4 (?) | 27 Sep 1989 | Bangkok, Thailand | |
| 12 | Win | 12–0 | (Philippines) Warlito Franco | PTS | 10 | 9 Jul 1989 | Rajadamnern Stadium, Bangkok, Thailand | |
| 11 | Win | 11–0 | (Japan) Yasutaka Yamada | KO | 3 (?) | 5 Jun 1989 | Bangkok, Thailand | |
| 10 | Win | 10–0 | (Philippines) Max Forrosuelo | PTS | 10 | 16 Apr 1989 | Bangkok, Thailand | |
| 9 | Win | 9–0 | (Indonesia) Nana Suhana | KO | 9 (?) | 22 Feb 1989 | Bangkok, Thailand | |
| 8 | Win | 8–0 | (South Korea) In Kyu Hwang | PTS | 10 | 22 Dec 1988 | Bangkok, Thailand | |
| 7 | Win | 7–0 | (Thailand) Ded Donjadee | PTS | 10 | 19 Oct 1988 | Bangkok, Thailand | Won Thai minimumweight title |
| 6 | Win | 6–0 | (Thailand) Wisanuchai Kiatsonthaya | KO | 3 (?) | 28 Sep 1988 | Bangkok, Thailand | |
| 5 | Win | 5–0 | (Thailand) Singsamong Kaennorasi | KO | 2 (?) | 14 Sep 1988 | Bangkok, Thailand | |
| 4 | Win | 4–0 | (Thailand) Singhyok Jockygym | KO | 2 (?) | 31 Aug 1988 | Rajadamnern Stadium, Bangkok, Thailand | |
| 3 | Win | 3–0 | (Thailand) Singern Sithkosa | KO | 1 (6) | 4 Aug 1988 | Rajadamnern Stadium, Bangkok, Thailand | |
| 2 | Win | 2–0 | (Thailand) Fahlan Sakkreerin | PTS | 8 | 30 Jun 1988 | Bangkok, Thailand | |
| 1 | Win | 1–0 | (Thailand) Rantae Luadayuthaya | KO | 3 (?) | 23 May 1988 | Bangkok, Thailand | |

== See also ==
- List of Mini-flyweight boxing champions

Achievements
| Preceded by Hideyuki Ohashi | WBA minimumweight champion February 10, 1993 – December 2, 1995 | Succeeded by Rosendo Álvarez |
| Preceded by Keitaro Hoshino | WBA minimumweight champion April 16, 2001– August 25, 2001 | Succeeded by Yutaka Niida |
