= Yutaka Niida =

Japanese boxer

Personal information
- Nationality: Japanese
- Born: 新井田豊; October 2, 1978 (age 47) Yokohama, Kanagawa,
- Height: 5 ft 1 1/2 in (156 cm)
- Weight: Minimumweight

Boxing career
- Reach: 62 1/2 in (159 cm)
- Stance: Orthodox

Boxing record
- Total fights: 28
- Wins: 23
- Win by KO: 9
- Losses: 2
- Draws: 3

Yutaka Niida (新井田豊, Niida Yutaka; born October 2, 1978 in Yokohama, Kanagawa) is a retired professional boxer in the minimumweight (105 lb) division and former WBA world minimumweight champion.

== Professional boxing career ==
Niida belonged to the Yokohama Hikari Boxing Gym, his trainer was Mitsunori Seki and Hidefumi Oikawa. He first won the WBA minimumweight title at the Pacifico Yokohama on August 25, 2001, when he defeated Chana Porpaoin by unanimous decision. On October 22 only two months later, Niida vacated the title, with the intention of retiring due to back problems and lost interest in boxing.

Niida returned two years later and challenged Noel Arambulet for the title at the same venue, but Niida suffered his first loss, by split decision. Niida fought against Arambulet again at the Korakuen Hall on July 3, 2004; this time Niida won the title by unanimous decision in addition to Arambulet not making the weight. Niida has successfully defended the title seven times since he regained it, winning his last defense occurring against Jose Luis Varela at the Korakuen Hall on March 1, 2008 by knockout in the 6th round. However Mitsunori Seki died from a subarachnoid hemorrhage on June 6, 2008, his death gave Niida an intense shock.

Yutaka Niida lost his title via a fourth-round TKO at the Pacifico Yokohama on September 15, 2008 to Nicaragua's Román González. Presumably, he hung his gloves after the fight. Niida won the achievement award for the 41st Japan Professional Sports Grand Prize that year.

In 2010, Niida founded a public company "World Famous" named after the entrance song of his champion days created by the Japanese rapper BiARD for him, and established a sports gym "Body Design 新井田式 (which means Niida method)" in Yokohama on November 20. Hidefumi Oikawa also works as one of ten or so trainers in this gym.

== Professional boxing record ==
28 fights	23 wins	2 losses
By knockout	9	1
By decision	14	1
Draws	3	

No.	Result	Record	Opponent	Type	Round, time	Date	Location	Notes
28	Loss	23–2–3	Román González	TKO	4 (12), 1:59	15 Sep 2008	Pacifico Yokohama, Yokohama, Japan	Lost WBA minimumweight title
27	Win	23–1–3	José Luis Varela	KO	6 (12), 2:16	3 Mar 2008	Korakuen Hall, Tokyo, Japan	Retained WBA minimumweight title
26	Win	22–1–3	Eriberto Gejon	UD	12	1 Sep 2007	Korakuen Hall, Tokyo, Japan	Retained WBA minimumweight title
25	Win	21–1–3	Katsunari Takayama	SD	12	7 Apr 2007	Korakuen Hall, Tokyo, Japan	Retained WBA minimumweight title
24	Win	20–1–3	Ronald Barrera	UD	12	4 Mar 2006	Korakuen Hall, Tokyo, Japan	Retained WBA minimumweight title
23	Win	19–1–3	Eriberto Gejon	TD	10 (12), 2:01	25 Sep 2005	Yokohama Arena, Yokohama, Japan	Retained WBA minimumweight title
22	Win	18–1–3	Jae Won Kim	UD	12	16 Apr 2005	Nippon Budokan, Tokyo, Japan	Retained WBA minimumweight title
21	Win	17–1–3	Juan Jose Landaeta	SD	12	30 Oct 2004	Ryōgoku Kokugikan, Tokyo, Japan	Retained WBA minimumweight title
20	Win	16–1–3	Noel Arambulet	UD	12	3 Jul 2004	Korakuen Hall, Tokyo, Japan	Won vacant WBA minimumweight title
19	Win	15–1–3	Ut Taprakhon	TKO	5 (10), 2:55	8 Dec 2003	Korakuen Hall, Tokyo, Japan	
18	Loss	14–1–3	Noel Arambulet	SD	12	12 Jul 2003	Pacifico Yokohama, Yokohama, Japan	For vacant WBA minimumweight title
17	Win	14–0–3	Chana Porpaoin	UD	12	25 Aug 2001	Pacifico Yokohama, Yokohama, Japan	Won WBA minimumweight title
16	Draw	13–0–3	Daisuke Iida	UD	10	14 May 2001	Korakuen Hall, Tokyo, Japan	Retained Japanese minimumweight title
15	Win	13–0–2	Makoto Suzuki	TKO	9 (10), 2:53	8 Jan 2001	Korakuen Hall, Tokyo, Japan	Won Japanese minimumweight title
14	Win	12–0–2	Sonny Boy Panding	KO	1 (8), 2:09	11 Oct 2000	Pacifico Yokohama, Yokohama, Japan	
13	Win	11–0–2	Itsuo Oka	TKO	8 (10), 0:43	30 May 2000	Korakuen Hall, Tokyo, Japan	
12	Win	10–0–2	Atsuomi Maeda	UD	8	23 Mar 2000	Korakuen Hall, Tokyo, Japan	
11	Win	9–0–2	Rudolfo Fernandez	KO	2 (10), 1:51	18 Oct 1999	Korakuen Hall, Tokyo, Japan	
10	Win	8–0–2	Masanori Suga	MD	6	27 Jun 1999	Ariake Coliseum, Tokyo, Japan	
9	Win	7–0–2	Rogelio Lapian	UD	8	15 Feb 1999	Korakuen Hall, Tokyo, Japan	
8	Win	6–0–2	Hidetaka Kitano	KO	1 (6), 2:17	3 Dec 1998	Korakuen Hall, Tokyo, Japan	
7	Draw	5–0–2	Kenichiro Hamaguchi	MD	6	18 Sep 1998	Korakuen Hall, Tokyo, Japan	
6	Draw	5–0–1	Tsutomu Oshigane	SD	6	29 Mar 1998	Korakuen Hall, Tokyo, Japan	
5	Win	5–0	Yuki Hashiguchi	UD	6	3 Oct 1997	Korakuen Hall, Tokyo, Japan	
4	Win	4–0	Kazuhisa Takahashi	UD	4	26 Jul 1997	Yokohama Arena, Yokohama, Japan	
3	Win	3–0	Tatsuro Oya	KO	1 (4), 2:42	17 Sep 1997	Korakuen Hall, Tokyo, Japan	
2	Win	2–0	Akio Yamamoto	UD	4	20 Dec 1996	Nanba Grand Kagetsu, Osaka, Japan	
1	Win	1–0	Satoshi Shinkai	KO	1 (4), 1:37	15 Nov 1996	Korakuen Hall, Tokyo, Japan	

== See also ==
- List of WBA world champions
- List of strawweight boxing champions
- List of Japanese boxing world champions
- Boxing in Japan

Achievements
Preceded by Chana Porpaoin	WBA minimumweight champion August 25, 2001 – October 22, 2001; Retired	Vacant Title next held by Keitaro Hoshino
Vacant Title last held by Noel Arambulet	WBA minimumweight champion July 3, 2004 – September 15, 2008	Succeeded by Román González
