= Keitaro Hoshino =

Japanese boxer (1969–2021)

Personal information
- Nationality: Japanese
- Born: 14 August 1969 Yokohama, Japan
- Died: 9 October 2021 (aged 52)
- Height: 5 ft 2 1/2 in (159 cm)
- Weight: minimumweight

Boxing career
- Stance: Orthodox

Boxing record
- Total fights: 33
- Wins: 23
- Win by KO: 6
- Losses: 10

Keitaro Hoshino (14 August 1969 – 9 October 2021) was a Japanese boxer.

== Professional career ==
Hoshino turned pro in 1988 and captured the WBA minimumweight title with a decision win over Joma Gamboa in 2000. He defended the belt once before losing it by split decision to Chana Porpaoin in 2001. He recaptured the vacant WBA minimumweight title with a decision win over Gamboa in 2002, but lost the belt in his first defense to Noel Arambulet.

== Professional boxing record ==
33 fights	23 wins	10 losses
By knockout	6	5
By decision	17	5

No.	Result	Record	Opponent	Type	Round, time	Date	Location	Notes
33	Loss	23–10	(Mexico) José Antonio Aguirre	TKO	12 (12), 2:15	23 Jun 2003	Yokohama Arena, Yokohama, Japan	For WBC minimumweight title
32	Loss	23–9	(Venezuela) Noel Arambulet	MD	12	20 Dec 2002	Osaka-jō Hall, Osaka, Japan	For WBA minimumweight title
31	Loss	23–8	(Venezuela) Noel Arambulet	MD	12	29 Jul 2002	Pacifico Yokohama, Yokohama, Japan	Lost WBA minimumweight title
30	Win	23–7	(Philippines) Joma Gamboa	UD	12	29 Jan 2002	Pacifico Yokohama, Yokohama, Japan	Won vacant WBA minimumweight title
29	Win	22–7	(Thailand) Prabpram Porpreecha	TKO	10 (10), 1:59	26 Sep 2001	Cultural Gymnasium, Yokohama, Japan	
28	Loss	21–7	(Thailand) Chana Porpaoin	SD	12	16 Apr 2001	Pacifico Yokohama, Yokohama, Japan	Lost WBA minimumweight title
27	Win	21–6	(Philippines) Joma Gamboa	UD	12	6 Dec 2000	Pacifico Yokohama, Yokohama, Japan	Won WBA minimumweight title
26	Win	20–6	(Japan) Hiroshi Nakajima	UD	10	30 May 2000	Korakuen Hall, Tokyo, Japan	
25	Win	19–6	(Japan) Keisuke Yokoyama	UD	10	1 Feb 2000	Tokyo, Japan	
24	Win	18–6	(Japan) Hiroshi Nakajima	UD	10	5 Sep 1998	Ryōgoku Kokugikan, Tokyo, Japan	Retained JBC Japanese minimumweight title
23	Win	17–6	(Japan) Itsuo Oka	MD	10	26 May 1998	Korakuen Hall, Tokyo, Japan	Retained JBC Japanese minimumweight title
22	Win	16–6	(Japan) Makoto Suzuki	TKO	9 (10), 0:15	24 Feb 1998	Korakuen Hall, Tokyo, Japan	Retained JBC Japanese minimumweight title
21	Win	15–6	(Japan) Satoshi Yoshida	PTS	10	5 Aug 1997	Tokyo, Japan	Retained JBC Japanese minimumweight title
20	Win	14–6	(Philippines) Ernesto Rubillar	UD	10	25 Feb 1997	Tokyo, Japan	Retained JBC Japanese minimumweight title
19	Win	13–6	(Japan) Keisuke Yokoyama	TKO	8 (10)	6 Aug 1996	Tokyo, Japan	Won JBC Japanese minimumweight title
18	Loss	12–6	(Philippines) Allan Butlig	KO	2	21 Mar 1996	Yokohama, Japan	
17	Win	12–5	(Philippines) Ernesto Rubillar	PTS	10	23 Oct 1995	Tokyo, Japan	
16	Win	11–5	(Philippines) David Franco	UD	10	17 Jul 1995	Tokyo, Japan	
15	Win	10–5	(Philippines) Rolando Tadle	PTS	10	17 Apr 1995	Tokyo, Japan	
14	Win	9–5	(Japan) Kimihiko Ide	KO	1	23 Jan 1995	Tokyo, Japan	
13	Win	8–5	(Japan) Hiroyuki Kasuya	PTS	8	28 Aug 1994	Tokyo, Japan	
12	Win	7–5	(Japan) Mitsunori Mori	TKO	1	4 May 1994	Cultural Gymnasium, Yokohama, Japan	
11	Loss	6–5	(Japan) Hiroki Sakakibara	TKO	6 (6), 1:56	22 Oct 1993	Tokyo, Japan	
10	Win	6–4	(Japan) Satoshi Yoshida	PTS	5	3 Aug 1993	Tokyo, Japan	
9	Loss	5–4	(Japan) Katsuaki Eguchi	TKO	4	22 Mar 1993	Tokyo, Japan	
8	Loss	5–3	(Japan) Masahide Makiyama	KO	3 (8), 3:00	18 Jan 1993	Korakuen Hall, Tokyo, Japan	
7	Loss	5–2	(Japan) Katsuaki Eguchi	PTS	5	20 Jul 1992	Tokyo, Japan	
6	Win	5–1	(Japan) Takeshi Watanabe	PTS	6	6 Jun 1992	Kawasaki, Japan	
5	Win	4–1	(Japan) Hideo Suzuki	TKO	3	16 Jan 1992	Yokohama, Japan	
4	Win	3–1	(Japan) Tetsuya Yoshitomi	PTS	4	28 Oct 1991	Tokyo, Japan	
3	Win	2–1	(Japan) Abo Oguni	PTS	4	22 Aug 1991	Tokyo, Japan	
2	Win	1–1	(Japan) Katsunori Takizawa	PTS	4	13 Mar 1989	Tokyo, Japan	
1	Loss	0–1	(Japan) Naruhisa Nagayama	PTS	4	3 Nov 1988	Korakuen Hall, Tokyo, Japan	

== See also ==
- List of WBA world champions
- List of Japanese boxing world champions
- Boxing in Japan

Achievements
Preceded by Joma Gamboa	WBA minimumweight champion 6 December 2000 - 16 April 2001	Succeeded by Chana Porpaoin
Vacant Title last held by Yutaka Niida	WBA minimumweight champion 29 January 2002 - 29 July 2002	Succeeded by Noel Arambulet
