= Mini flyweight =

Weight class in combat sports

Mini flyweight, also known as paperweight (early), minimumweight, strawweight, or super atomweight, is a weight class in combat sports.

== Boxing ==
In professional boxing, boxers in the minimumweight division may weigh no more than 105 pounds (48 kg). This is a relatively new weight category for professionals, first inaugurated by the major boxing sanctioning bodies between 1987 and 1990.

=== History ===
The minimumweight division was originally introduced in 1968 for the Summer Olympic Games under the name light flyweight. However, the division was not recognized by any of the four most widely regarded sanctioning bodies until the International Boxing Federation (IBF) in June 1987, when Kyung-Yung Lee knocked out Masaharu Kawakami to become the inaugural champion.

The division was then later recognized by the World Boxing Council (WBC) in October 1987, the World Boxing Association (WBA) in January 1988, and the World Boxing Organization (WBO) in August 1989, while Ring magazine did not begin ranking minimumweights until 1997 under the name strawweights and would not name a champion until 2024, when Oscar Collazo knocked out Knockout CP Freshmart.

Historically, the weight class has been dominated by Latin Americans and Asians, with only a limited amount of success coming from other nationalities.

==== Late 1980s (1987–1989) ====
In the early years of the division, fighters such as Napa Kiatwanchai found success defending the WBC belt. Hiroki Ioka also started out in the division, winning the WBC belt before finding success at light flyweight, flyweight, and super flyweight.

Other notable champions of this period included Nico Thomas, Jum-Hwan Choi, and Leo Gamez.

Other successful fighters of this period include:

- Ricardo López - defended his WBC title against record-breaking 21 opponents.
- Ratanapol Sor Vorapin - IBF title-holder for most of the decade.
- Chana Porpaoin - held WBA title until losing the title to Rosendo Álvarez, who then held it until 1998 for failing to make weight for his unification rematch with Ricardo Lopez (he lost by split decision).

The division also saw its first champions not from Latin America or Asia when Scotland's Paul Weir won the vacant WBO title over Fernando Martinez in May 1993. This was followed by South Africa's Zolani Petelo who won the IBF title in December 1997.

Other notable fighters of this period included, Hi-Yong Choi, Hideyuki Ohashi, Alex Sánchez, Wandee Chor Chareon, Rocky Lin, Ala Villamor, Kermin Guardia, Noel Arambulet, Songkram Porpaoin, and Osvaldo Guerrero.

==== 2000s ====
2000–2003

In the early part of the decade, José Antonio Aguirre and Iván Calderón were the most decorated champions.

2004–2006

Muhammad Rachman, Yutaka Niida, and Eagle Kyowa became champions. José Antonio Aguirre began to decline, but Iván Calderón continued to defend his WBO title until August 2007, when he moved up to light flyweight.

2007–2009

In the later part of the decade, Oleydong Sithsamerchai, Donnie Nietes, Raúl García, and Román González were champions.

==== 2010s ====
In the early part of the decade, many of the fighters from the end of the 2000s continued to find success. However, new faces have included Denver Cuello and Kazuto Ioka (nephew of 1980s champion Hiroki Ioka). In the latter part of the decade, Thai boxers returned to dominance with Knockout CP Freshmart and Wanheng Menayothin winning titles and staying undefeated for some time.

=== Professional boxing ===
==== Current world champions ====
Sanctioning Body	Reign Began	Champion	Record	Defenses
WBA	November 16, 2024	Oscar Collazo	14–0 (11 KO)	3
WBC	May 16, 2026	Siyakholwa Kuse	10–3–1 (4 KO)	0
IBF	July 28, 2024	Pedro Taduran	20–4–1 (14 KO)	3
WBO	May 27, 2023	Oscar Collazo	14–0 (11 KO)	7

==== Current The Ring world rankings ====
As of December 28, 2025.

Keys:

C Current The Ring world champion

Rank	Name	Record	Title(s)
C	Oscar Collazo	12–0 (9 KO)	WBO, WBA
1	Pedro Taduran	20–4–1 (14 KO)	IBF
2	Siyakholwa Kuse	10–3–1 (13 KO)	WBC
3	Melvin Jerusalem	25–4 (12 KO)	
4	Ryūsei Matsumoto	8–0 (4 KO)	
5	Joey Canoy	24–5–2–1 (15 KO)	
6	Takeshi Ishii	10–1 (8 KO)	
7	Vic Saludar	26–6 (16 KO)	
8	Joseph Sumabong	10–1 (5 KO)	
9	Beaven Sibanda	9–1 (3 KO)	
10	Dianxing Zhu	16–1 (14 KO)	

=== Amateur boxing ===
Since 1968, the Summer Olympic Games has featured the 48 kilogram division under the name light flyweight (not to be confused with the 108 pound division in professional boxing).

==== Olympic champions ====
- 1968 – Francisco Rodríguez (VEN)
- 1972 – György Gedó (HUN)
- 1976 – Jorge Hernández (CUB)
- 1980 – Shamil Sabirov (URS)
- 1984 – Paul Gonzales (USA)
- 1988 – Ivailo Marinov (BUL)
- 1992 – Rogelio Marcelo (CUB)
- 1996 – Daniel Petrov (BUL)
- 2000 – Brahim Asloum (FRA)
- 2004 – Yan Bartelemí Varela (CUB)
- 2008 – Zou Shiming (CHN)
- 2012 – Zou Shiming (CHN)

==== European Champions ====
- 1969 – (Hungary) György Gedó (HUN)
- 1971 – (Hungary) György Gedó (HUN)
- 1973 – (Soviet Union) Vladislav Sasypko (URS)
- 1975 – (Soviet Union) Aleksandr Tkachenko (URS)
- 1977 – (Poland) Henryk Średnicki (POL)
- 1979 – (Soviet Union) Shamil Sabirov (URS)
- 1981 – (Bulgaria) Ismail Mustafov (BUL)
- 1983 – (Bulgaria) Ismail Mustafov (BUL)
- 1985 – (East Germany) René Breitbarth (GDR)
- 1987 – (Soviet Union) Nszan Munczian (URS)
- 1989 – (Bulgaria) Ivailo Marinov (BUL)
- 1991 – (Bulgaria) Ivailo Marinov (BUL)
- 1993 – (Bulgaria) Daniel Petrov (BUL)
- 1996 – (Bulgaria) Daniel Petrov (BUL)
- 1998 – (Russia) Sergey Kazakov (RUS)
- 2000 – (Ukraine) Valeriy Sydorenko (UKR)
- 2002 – (Russia) Sergey Kazakov (RUS)
- 2004 – (Russia) Sergey Kazakov (RUS)
- 2006 – (Russia) David Ayrapetyan (RUS)

==== Pan American Champions ====
- 1971 – (Cuba) Rafael Carbonell (CUB)
- 1975 – (Cuba) Jorge Hernández (CUB)
- 1979 – (Cuba) Hector Ramírez (CUB)
- 1983 – (Puerto Rico) Rafael Ramos (PUR)
- 1987 – (Puerto Rico) Luis Román Rolón (PUR)
- 1991 – (Cuba) Rogelio Marcelo (CUB)
- 1995 – (Venezuela) Edgar Velázquez (VEN)
- 1999 – (Cuba) Maikro Romero (CUB)
- 2003 – (Cuba) Yan Bartelemí Varela (CUB)

=== Notable minimumweights ===
- Iván Calderon
- Ricardo López
- Rosendo Álvarez
- Alex Sánchez
- Donnie Nietes
- Eagle Kyowa
- Chana Porpaoin
- Ratanapol Sor Vorapin
- Yutaka Niida
- Muhammad Rachman
- Román González

== Kickboxing ==
In kickboxing, the International Kickboxing Federation (IKF) Strawweight division (professional and amateur) is below 108.1 lbs. or 49.09 kg. In ONE Championship, the strawweight division is up to 56.7 kg (125 lb).

== Mixed martial arts ==
In MMA, strawweight is considered 115lbs (52kg) and below and is typically contested by women. It is never referred to as "minimumweight" in MMA.

== Other sports ==
Other sports to include a minimumweight division include the following,

- Muay Thai, both Lumpinee Boxing Stadium and Rajadamnern Stadium feature a 105-pound weight categories recognized as mini flyweight.
- Judo, features a 105-pound weight category for female competitions.
- Various styles of wrestling feature a 105-pound weight category. Including a 48 kilogram women's division in the Summer Olympic Games.
- Taekwondo, commonly features competitions at or around 105 pounds. Including a 49 kilogram women's division in the Summer Olympic Games recognized as flyweight.

== See also ==
- Pinweight
