= Michael Carbajal vs. Humberto González =

Boxing match

La Explosion
- Date: March 13, 1993
- Venue: Las Vegas Hilton, Las Vegas, Nevada, U.S.
- Title(s) on the line: WBC and IBF light flyweight championship

Tale of the tape
Boxer	Michael Carbajal	Humberto González
Nickname	"Manitas de Piedra" "Little Hands of Stone"	"Chiquita"
Hometown	Phoenix, Arizona, U.S.	Ciudad Nezahualcóyotl, Edomex, Mexico
Pre-fight record	27–0 (15 KO)	36–1 (28 KO)
Age	25 years, 5 months	26 years, 11 months
Height	5 ft 5 1/2 in (166 cm)	5 ft 1 in (155 cm)
Weight	107 lb (49 kg)	107 1/2 lb (49 kg)
Style	Orthodox	Orthodox
Recognition	IBF; Light Flyweight Champion; The Ring; No. 2 Ranked Light Flyweight	WBC; Light Flyweight Champion; The Ring; No. 3 Ranked Light Flyweight

Result
- Carbajal defeats González by 7th round knockout

Michael Carbajal vs. Humberto González, billed as La Explosion, was a professional boxing match contested on March 13, 1993 at the Las Vegas Hilton for the IBF and WBC junior flyweight world championships. The fight made boxing history in many ways. While this pair of world champions fought three times, their first fight is the one that writers and fans usually remember with fondness.

== Background ==
In boxing, there are certain types of "rivalries" that fans get excited about most of the time. When a Puerto Rican fighter faces a Mexican, for example, in a major title fight, most of the time the fight itself is considered a big boxing event. The same can be said about Mexicans fighting against a fellow Mexican for a world title.

The Mexican versus Mexican-American rivalries also fall among boxing fans' favorite rivalries. A good example is the sustained rivalry between Bobby Chacon, from California, and Rafael Limón, from Mexico. A more recent example is Oscar De La Hoya against Julio César Chávez.

When Michael Carbajal, from Phoenix, Arizona, became a professional boxer in 1989, Humberto González, from Mexico, was already a seasoned professional. Carbajal's promoter, Bob Arum, told Ring magazine that Carbajal would be the first junior flyweight to earn one million dollars for one fight.

Carbajal won the IBF world junior flyweight title in 1990, joining WBC world champion Gonzalez as co-champions of that division. After Carbajal won the title, fan excitement about a possible match between the two began to grow. But Gonzalez lost his title to Rolando Pascua on October of that year, and he had to regain it from Melchor Cob Castro, who took over as champion after beating Pascua.

Meanwhile, Carbajal had begun a streak of defenses against a number of important challengers. When Gonzalez regained his WBC belt, he also retained it against a long list of challengers. The fact that both boxers were seemingly on what boxing fans call a "clash course" brought another element of excitement whenever fans would talk about a future match between Carbajal and Gonzalez.

Knowing that this was a well talked about match-up, promoter Arum began to work towards making it happen. In what could perhaps be called a rare case of boxing unity, both the WBC and IBF agreed to have their champions fight a unification bout. The date set was March 13, 1993. The fight received much media attention both in the United States and in Latin America, with Carbajal and Gonzalez being featured on the cover of multiple magazines on the months preceding the bout.

Arum proved half prophetic in his guess that Carbajal would be the first junior flyweight to earn one million dollars in a fight: Both Carbajal and Gonzalez got a guarantee of one million dollars, after they paid their due fees, and Carbajal-Gonzalez I became the first time in history that a fight fought at the Flyweight division or a smaller one garnered one boxer that amount of money. It was also the first time that a junior flyweight world title bout was shown as the main event of a Pay Per View fight card.

== The fights ==
=== De La Hoya vs. Mayweather ===
In the chief support, 1992 Olympics gold medallist Oscar De La Hoya faced Jeff Mayweather. It was De La Hoya's first scheduled 8 round bout.

De La Hoya would stop Mayweather in the 4th round.

Preceded by vs. Curtis Strong	Oscar De La Hoya's bouts 13 March 1993	Succeeded by vs. Mike Grable
Preceded by vs. Jorge Romero	Jeff Mayweather's bouts 13 March 1993	Succeeded by vs. John Avila

=== Main Event ===
The fight took place on the date that it was set for (unlike many major fights that sometimes get postponed). Carbajal and Gonzalez fought that night in front of an estimated crowd of 6,400 in the Hilton Center at the Las Vegas Hilton. Among the people watching the fight in person were many Hollywood stars, which is also very rare for a junior flyweight bout.

Gonzalez set the pace in round one with his jab and cross, stunning Carbajal as he (Gonzalez) counter-punched. Gonzalez proved very slick for Carbajal, who had trouble finding his rival, but nonetheless, fought back furiously. In round two, a Gonzalez right to Carbajal's chin sent the Arizona native down for a short count.

Carbajal started landing stronger punches by round three. But Gonzalez's ability to counter-punch Carbajal's attack seemed to be the factor that would dictate the fight. By the end of the round, Carbajal sported a cut over one of his eyes.

Gonzalez and Carbajal kept trading punches in round four, but it was apparent that Gonzalez was faring better than Carbajal. Carbajal's corner team had begun to grow impatient by this point.

Gonzalez almost had Carbajal knocked out in round five. Ironically, that round might have been the round that turned the fight in Carbajal's favor. A straight right landed flush on Carbajal's chin, and Carbajal struggled to stay inside the fight's ring as he fell, grabbing to the rope with his left hand. Gonzalez was now eager to finish the fight by knockout, and Carbajal realized he was behind on points so badly, that he had to try to win by knockout as well.

Fighting with desperation, Carbajal finally got to Gonzalez, who by now was tired, in round six, connecting strong punches to the head and causing swelling around one of Gonzalez's eyes.

Still, Carbajal felt that he had to do more to win the bout. As both fighters were looking for a defining, knockout punch they traded punches in the seventh round, as they say in boxing, "toe to toe". During one of these exchanges, Carbajal unexpectedly landed a right uppercut to Gonzalez's chin, leaving him paralyzed on his feet. As Gonzalez did not move from his stand for the next couple of seconds, Carbajal took advantage and moved to the right, adding a left to Gonzalez's face that would make Gonzalez fall to the canvas on his back. The referee counted Gonzalez out, giving Carbajal the fight by a seventh-round knockout.

== Aftermath ==
Michael Carbajal defended the IBF and WBC world junior flyweight titles twice before his second fight with Gonzalez. The pair fought three fights, with Gonzalez winning the next two, one in Los Angeles and another one in Mexico City, but both of Gonzalez's wins came by controversial decision and the two sequels to fight one between Carbajal and Gonzalez were considered to be boring fights by fans and writers alike.

Gonzalez retired after losing the IBF and WBC belts to Saman Sorjaturong in 1995. Carbajal, for his part, kept on winning, and losing, world titles until his last fight, when he knocked out Jorge Arce in eleven rounds at Tijuana in 1999 to regain the WBO version of the world junior flyweight championship.

Michael Carbajal and Humberto González were both elected as members of the International Boxing Hall of Fame in 2006.

== Undercard ==
Confirmed bouts:

== Broadcasting ==
Country	Broadcaster
United States	Fox Sports
Thailand	Channel 7

Preceded by vs. Robinson Cuesta	Michael Carbajal's bouts 13 March 1993	Succeeded by vs. Kim Kwang-sun
Preceded by vs. Melchor Cob Castro	Humberto González's bouts 13 March 1993	Succeeded by vs. Pablo Tiznado
Awards
Previous: Evander Holyfield vs. Riddick Bowe	The Ring Fight of the Year; 1993	Next: Jorge Castro vs. John David Jackson
Previous: Michael Moorer vs. Bert Cooper	KO Magazine Fight of the Year; 1993	Award Discontinued
