= Choi Yo-sam =

South Korean boxer (1973–2008)

Personal information
- Nationality: (South Korea) South Korean
- Born: October 16, 1973 Jeongeup, Jeollabukdo, South Korea
- Died: January 3, 2008 (aged 34) Seoul, South Korea
- Weight: Light flyweight

Boxing career
- Stance: Orthodox

Boxing record
- Total fights: 37
- Wins: 32
- Win by KO: 19
- Losses: 5

- Choi Yo-sam
- Hangul: 최요삼
- RR: Choe Yosam
- MR: Ch'oe Yosam

Choi Yo-sam (Korean: 최요삼; October 16, 1973 – January 3, 2008) was a Korean world boxing champion. He was born in Jeongeup, Jeollabukdo, South Korea.

== Pro career ==
Choi turned pro in 1993 and won the Lineal and WBC light flyweight titles in 1999 with a decision win over Saman Sorjaturong. He successfully defended the titles three times before losing it to Jorge Arce by a 6th round technical knockout in 2002. In 2003, he lost a decision to Beibis Mendoza for the interim WBA light flyweight title. In 2004, he moved up in weight to take on Lorenzo Parra for the WBA flyweight title and lost a decision.

== Death ==
On December 25, 2007, he successfully defended the WBO Intercontinental flyweight title with a unanimous decision victory over Heri Amol. In the 12th round, Choi was dropped with five seconds remaining, but beat the count. By the time the mandatory eight count was completed, the bell rang to end the contest. The scores were Jae Keun Kim 117-110, Dong Ahn Park 118-108, and Muhammad Rois 116-111. He collapsed while still in the ring after the bout and was rushed to the Soonchunhyang University Hospital immediately after the fight in order to undergo emergency brain surgery. Choi was pronounced brain dead on January 2, 2008, and died on January 3, 2008, when he was removed from a ventilator. Leessang made a song dedicated to him in their 5th album called CHAMPION.

His organs were donated to six patients with approval from his family. This action led the South Korean Government to award Choi with a medal.

== See also ==
- List of light flyweight boxing champions
- List of WBC world champions
- Kim Duk-koo

Achievements
Preceded by Saman Sorjaturong	Lineal Light Flyweight Champion; October 17, 1999 – July 6, 2002	Succeeded by Jorge Arce
Preceded by Saman Sorjaturong	WBC Light Flyweight Champion; October 17, 1999 – July 6, 2002	Succeeded by Jorge Arce
