= Humberto González =

Mexican boxer

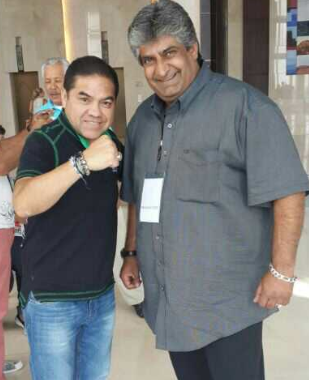
- Humberto González (left) with Pakistan boxing official Nauman Shah

Personal information
- Nickname: Chiquita
- Born: March 25, 1966 (age 60) Ciudad Nezahualcóyotl, Mexico
- Height: 5 ft 1 in (155 cm)
- Weight: Light flyweight

Boxing career
- Reach: 65 in (165 cm)
- Stance: Orthodox

Boxing record
- Total fights: 46
- Wins: 43
- Win by KO: 30
- Losses: 3

Humberto González (born March 25, 1966) is a Mexican former professional boxer who competed from 1984 to 1995. He is a three-time light-flyweight champion having held the World Boxing Council (WBC) title three times and then unified with the International Boxing Federation (IBF) title in 1994.

== Professional career ==
Gonzalez made his professional boxing debut on September 1, 1984, in Mexico City with a four-round decision win over Jorge Ortega Perez. Little over three months later, he had his first knockout win, as he beat Narciso Perez in the first round.

By the end of 1987, Gonzalez was 20-0 and held the Mexico light-flyweight title.

In 1988, he won four fights, all by knockout. He retained the national belt against Jose Luis Zepeda in six rounds at Tijuana, and Javier Vazquez, beaten in five at Mexico City.

His next fight, on June 25, 1989, brought two firsts to his career: Celebrated in Chonju, South Korea, it was his first fight abroad. Being for the WBC world Jr. Flyweight championship, it was also his first world title try. Gonzalez outpointed world champion Yul-Woo Lee over 12 rounds to crown himself world champion. On December 9, he again fought in South Korea, retaining his world championship against former champion and future hall of fame member Jung-Koo Chang by a decision in 12. Chang had previously defended the same title a then division record 15 times before vacating it following a brief retirement the year prior.

In 1990, Gonzalez retained the title four times, including a win against future champion Francisco Tejedor, but on December 19, he suffered a shocking defeat to Rolando Pascua, a boxer who was unknown to most boxing experts, in Inglewood. The knockout in round six suffered by Gonzalez that night cost him the world title.

After a win in 1991, Gonzalez recovered the world title, by defeating the man who had taken the world championship away from Pascua: Melchor Cob Castro. Gonzalez and Castro met on June 3 at Las Vegas, and Gonzalez won a 12-round decision.

In 1992, he retained the title four times, beating Castro in a rematch, reigning Olympic flyweight gold medalist Kim Kwang-sun, Domingo Sosa and former world champion Napa Kiatwanchai.

By then, talks about a superfight between him and IBF world champion Michael Carbajal were common among boxing fans. The fight, which came on March 13, 1993, was the first million-dollar fight in Jr. Flyweight boxing history (both fighters were guaranteed one million dollars in earnings) and also the first Jr. Flyweight fight in history to head a Pay Per View boxing card. In front of many Hollywood stars and thousands of fans at the arena, Gonzalez dropped Carbajal in rounds two and five, but Carbajal recovered to knock Gonzalez out in round seven. He finished the year with two ten-round decision wins, including one against Pablo Tiznado, a boxer who also fought against Alex Sanchez.

Carbajal and Gonzalez met in a rematch February 19, 1994 at Inglewood, and the second time around, Gonzalez became a three time world Jr. Flyweight champion by beating Carbajal by decision in 12. With that win, he joined an exclusive group of boxers who have been world champions three times or more in the same division, alongside such others as Muhammad Ali, Carlos De León, Evander Holyfield and Sugar Ray Robinson. Gonzalez won two more fights, one a non-title bout, and the other a title defense versus Juan Domingo Córdoba. Then, on November 12 of the same year, he and Carbajal had a rubber match, this time in Mexico City. Gonzalez again prevailed, on points over 12 rounds.

After retaining the title once in 1995, on July 15 of that year, he fought for the last time. Again, he dropped his rival, Saman Sorjaturong, a couple of times before being knocked out in round seven to lose his world title.

== Professional boxing record ==
46 fights	43 wins	3 losses
By knockout	30	3
By decision	13	0

No.	Result	Record	Opponent	Type	Round, time	Date	Location	Notes
46	Loss	43–3	Saman Sorjaturong	TKO	7 (12), 0:58	Jul 15, 1995	Great Western Forum, Inglewood, California, U.S.	Lost WBC and IBF light flyweight titles
45	Win	43–2	Jesus Zuniga	KO	5 (12), 1:26	Mar 31, 1995	Arrowhead Pond, Anaheim, California, U.S.	Retained WBC and IBF light flyweight titles
44	Win	42–2	Michael Carbajal	MD	12	Nov 12, 1994	Plaza de Toros México, Mexico City, Mexico	Retained WBC and IBF light flyweight titles
43	Win	41–2	Juan Domingo Córdoba	RTD	7 (12), 3:00	Sep 10, 1994	Caesars Tahoe, Stateline, Nevada, U.S.	Retained WBC and IBF light flyweight titles
42	Win	40–2	Armando Diaz	TKO	3 (10)	Jul 8, 1994	Great Western Forum, Inglewood, California, U.S.	
41	Win	39–2	Michael Carbajal	SD	12	Feb 19, 1994	Great Western Forum, Inglewood, California, U.S.	Won WBC and IBF light flyweight titles
40	Win	38–2	Armando Diaz	UD	10	Nov 17, 1993	Caesars Hotel & Casino, Atlantic City, New Jersey, U.S.	
39	Win	37–2	Pablo Tiznado	UD	10	Aug 28, 1993	Great Western Forum, Inglewood, California, U.S.	
38	Loss	36–2	Michael Carbajal	KO	7 (12), 2:59	Mar 13, 1993	Hilton Hotel, Winchester, Nevada, U.S.	Lost WBC light flyweight title; For IBF light flyweight title
37	Win	36–1	Melchor Cob Castro	UD	12	Dec 7, 1992	Great Western Forum, Inglewood, California, U.S.	Retained WBC light flyweight title
36	Win	35–1	Napa Kiatwanchai	KO	2 (12), 2:48	Sep 14, 1992	Great Western Forum, Inglewood, California, U.S.	Retained WBC light flyweight title
35	Win	34–1	Kwang-sun Kim	TKO	12 (12), 0:55	Jun 7, 1992	Olympic Fencing Gymnasium, Seoul, South Korea	Retained WBC light flyweight title
34	Win	33–1	Domingo Sosa	UD	12	Jan 27, 1992	Great Western Forum, Inglewood, California, U.S.	Retained WBC light flyweight title
33	Win	32–1	Melchor Cob Castro	UD	12	Jun 3, 1991	Caesars Palace, Paradise, Nevada, U.S.	Won WBC light flyweight title
32	Win	31–1	Rey Hernandez	KO	9 (10)	Mar 15, 1991	Ciudad Juárez, Mexico	
31	Loss	30–1	Rolando Pascua	KO	6 (12), 2:24	Dec 19, 1990	Great Western Forum, Inglewood, California, U.S.	Lost WBC light flyweight title
30	Win	30–0	Jorge Rivera	TKO	9 (12), 1:37	Aug 25, 1990	Plaza de Toros, Cancún, Mexico	Retained WBC light flyweight title
29	Win	29–0	Jung Keun Lim	TKO	5 (12), 0:34	Jul 23, 1990	Great Western Forum, Inglewood, California, U.S.	Retained WBC light flyweight title
28	Win	28–0	Luis Monzote	TKO	3 (12), 0:54	Jun 4, 1990	Great Western Forum, Inglewood, California, U.S.	Retained WBC light flyweight title
27	Win	27–0	Francisco Tejedor	KO	3 (12), 0:31	Mar 24, 1990	Arena México, Mexico City, Mexico	Retained WBC light flyweight title
26	Win	26–0	Jung-koo Chang	UD	12	Dec 9, 1989	Indoor Gymnasium, Daegu, South Korea	Retained WBC light flyweight title
25	Win	25–0	Yul-woo Lee	UD	12	Jun 25, 1989	Cheongju Gymnasium, Cheongju, South Korea	Won WBC light flyweight title
24	Win	24–0	Jorge Rivera	KO	4 (?)	Oct 22, 1988	Cozumel, Mexico	
23	Win	23–0	Atanasio Villareal	TD	4 (?)	Oct 1, 1988	Mexico City, Mexico	
22	Win	22–0	Javier Varguez	TKO	5 (12)	Jun 4, 1988	Mexico City, Mexico	Retained Mexican light flyweight title
21	Win	21–0	Jose Luis Zepeda	TKO	6 (12)	Mar 5, 1988	Tijuana, Mexico	Retained Mexican light flyweight title
20	Win	20–0	Jorge Cano	PTS	12	Sep 26, 1987	Cancún, Mexico	Won Mexican light flyweight title
19	Win	19–0	Jose Manuel Diaz	KO	2 (10)	Jul 25, 1987	Palacio de los Deportes, Mexico City, Mexico	
18	Win	18–0	Santiago Mendez Gamboa	KO	8 (?)	Jun 13, 1987	Mexico City, Mexico	
17	Win	17–0	Ruben Padilla	TKO	7 (?)	May 9, 1987	Mexico City, Mexico	
16	Win	16–0	Javier Alonso	KO	1 (?)	Feb 27, 1987	Acapulco, Mexico	
15	Win	15–0	Jorge Gutierrez	TKO	6 (?)	Dec 6, 1986	Mexico City, Mexico	
14	Win	14–0	Agustin Macias	TKO	4 (?)	Oct 8, 1986	Mexico City, Mexico	
13	Win	13–0	Martin Ortega	KO	1 (?)	Jul 14, 1986	Mexico City, Mexico	
12	Win	12–0	Alcibiades Hernandez	TKO	2 (?)	Jun 18, 1986	Mexico City, Mexico	
11	Win	11–0	Sergio Medina	KO	3 (?)	May 22, 1986	Ciudad Nezahualcóyotl, Mexico	
10	Win	10–0	Martin Perez	TKO	2 (?)	Mar 15, 1986	Arena Coliseo, Mexico City, Mexico	
9	Win	9–0	Carlos Rezago	KO	5 (?)	Dec 14, 1985	Mexico City, Mexico	
8	Win	8–0	Javier Alvarez	TKO	1 (?)	Nov 9, 1985	Mexico City, Mexico	
7	Win	7–0	Eduardo Ramirez	PTS	6	Sep 7, 1985	Mexico City, Mexico	
6	Win	6–0	Otilio Gallegos	TKO	2 (?)	Jul 27, 1985	Mexico City, Mexico	
5	Win	5–0	Martin Alvarez	TKO	2 (?)	Jun 8, 1985	Mexico City, Mexico	
4	Win	4–0	Francisco Villagomez	TKO	1 (?)	Apr 20, 1985	Mexico City, Mexico	
3	Win	3–0	Carmelo Perez	KO	1 (?)	Feb 20, 1985	Mexico City, Mexico	
2	Win	2–0	Narciso Perez	TKO	1 (?)	Dec 19, 1984	Mexico City, Mexico	
1	Win	1–0	Jorge Ortega	PTS	4	Sep 4, 1984	Mexico City, Mexico	

== Retirement ==
Immediately after the fight with Sorjaturong, he announced he was retiring, to pursue another dream of his: to become a successful businessman in Mexico City. Gonzalez had a record of 43 wins and 3 losses as a professional boxer, with 30 wins by knockout.

== Life after boxing ==
Gonzalez has remained retired from his athletic career and has since opened three meat markets in Mexico. He works part-time as a butcher in these businesses.

== Trivia ==
His first fight with Carbajal and his fight with Sorjaturong were both chosen as 1993 and 1995's Fight of the Year by The Ring. The Ring also placed Carbajal and Gonzalez on their list of the 100 greatest punchers of all time.

Both Humberto González and former rival Michael Carbajal were elected into the International Boxing Hall of Fame in 2006.

He earned many admirers during his professional boxing career. Female boxer Delia Gonzalez was one of them, and is nicknamed Chikita after Humberto.

== See also ==
- Lineal championship
- List of Mexican boxing world champions
- List of world light-flyweight boxing champions

Sporting positions
Regional boxing titles
Preceded by Jorge Cano	Mexican light-flyweight champion September 26, 1987 – 1988; Vacated	Vacant Title next held by Javier Varguez
World boxing titles
Preceded by Lee Yul-woo	WBC light-flyweight champion June 25, 1989 – December 19, 1990	Succeeded by Rolando Pascua
Preceded by Melchor Cob Castro	WBC light-flyweight champion June 3, 1991 – March 13, 1993	Succeeded by Michael Carbajal
Preceded by Michael Carbajal	WBC light-flyweight champion February 19, 1994 – July 15, 1995	Succeeded by Saman Sorjaturong
Preceded by Michael Carbajal	IBF light-flyweight champion February 19, 1994 – July 15, 1995	Succeeded by Saman Sorjaturong
Awards
Previous: Riddick Bowe vs. Evander Holyfield I	The Ring Fight of the Year vs. Michael Carbajal I 1993	Next: Jorge Castro vs. John David Jackson I
Previous: Jorge Castro vs. John David Jackson I	The Ring Fight of the Year vs. Saman Sorjaturong; 1995	Next: Evander Holyfield vs. Mike Tyson I
Previous: Jorge Castro vs. John David Jackson I Round 9	The Ring Round of the Year vs. Saman Sorjaturong; Round 7; 1995	Next: Frankie Liles vs. Tim Littles; Round 3
