= Rolando Pascua =

Filipino boxer (born 1965)

Personal information
- Nickname: Jojo
- Nationality: Filipino
- Born: Rolando Tomongtong; November 19, 1965 (age 60) Cebu City, Philippines
- Height: 5 ft 5 in (165 cm)
- Weight: Light-flyweight; Flyweight; Super-flyweight; Bantamweight; Super-bantamweight

Boxing career
- Stance: Southpaw

Boxing record
- Total fights: 70
- Wins: 45
- Win by KO: 17
- Losses: 25

Rolando Pascua (born Rolando Tomongtong; November 19, 1965) is a Filipino former professional boxer. He held the WBC light-flyweight title from 1990 to 1991 and challenged for the IBF super-flyweight title in 1993.

== Professional boxing career ==
Pascua debuted as a professional boxer on August 3, 1986, outpointing Eddie Dulay after four rounds in Pasay. Pascua built a record of 14 wins without a loss, with 3 wins by knockout, before facing 18 wins, 1 loss Jum Hwan Choi at Choi's hometown of Seoul, South Korea on January 28, 1988. Despite dropping the local in round six, Pascua lost a ten-round split decision to lose his condition as an undefeated fighter.

Pascua followed that first defeat with three wins in a row, over Triffon Torralba, Romy Austria and Jun Altarejos but then was surprisingly beaten by 0–1 Paul Badilla and by Rolando Protacio; these losses were both on points as Pascua lost to Badilla by ten round unanimous decision and to Protacio by eight rounds unanimous decision. Pascua then won two in a row, against Roger de Rama by ten round majority decision and Joseph Pacling by third-round technical knockout before facing world-ranked Rey Paciones, who was 22–2–3 (3 ties) with 5 knockouts coming into their bout. On August 19, 1989, Paciones defeated Pascua by ten rounds unanimous decision at Tagum City.

Pascua won 5 of his next six bouts, the exception being a loss by ten round unanimous decision at the hands of Napa Kiatwanchai, to become ranked by the WBC. He was matched to challenge WBC world champion Humberto González on December 19, 1990, at the Great Western Forum in Inglewood, California, United States in what also constituted Pascua's first professional bout in the United States. Gonzalez was undefeated and untied in 30 bouts and was being considered for an unification super fight with the equally undefeated International Boxing Federation world champion Michael Carbajal, but Pascua, who only had 8 knockout wins among his 24 victories in 29 fights and was not considered a very hard puncher, caused an upset when he dethroned the world champion by a stirring, sixth-round knockout to win the WBC light-flyweight title.

For his first defense, Pascua returned to the Great Western Forum, this time to meet Melchor Cob Castro, who with 30 wins, 2 losses and 4 draws was challenging for a world title for the first time and beat Pascua by tenth-round technical knockout on March 25, 1991.

After losing to Cob Castro, Pascua's career followed a pattern of highs and lows. He won six in a row right after that defeat, but then was defeated by undefeated (26–0) Yoon-Un Jin on October 23, 1992, at Seoul. Pascua again recuperated by putting another modest winning streak, reaching three wins in a row, which included avenging his early loss to Rey Paciones by 12th-round technical knockout on February 20, 1993, to win the Philippine Games and Amusement Board's national super-flyweight title.

Pascua then challenged Chatchai Sasakul for the WBC's international flyweight title but lost by unanimous 12-round decision at Bangkok on April 28, 1993, but he followed that loss with a win over Dodie Boy Peñalosa, a former world champion, by 10-round unanimous decision at the Cuneta Astrodome in Pasay on July 17.

After a fight in Japan in which Pascua defeated Hiroshi Kobayashi (an 8 wins, 8 losses and 1 tie boxer not to be confused with an earlier world champion boxer of the same name) by ten rounds unanimous decision on October 15, 1993, in Morioka, Pascua was once again ranked worldwide, this time by the IBF, and allowed to challenge for a world title, this time the IBF super-flyweight title which at the time was held by Mexican Julio Cesar Borboa, 20 wins and 4 losses coming into their fight. Pascua-Borboa, fought on November 26, 1993, at the Coliseo in Hermosillo, Mexico, was a war; Pascua almost became a two-time world champion when he dropped the Mexican boxer in round two but lost the fight when the champion dropped him and knocked him out in the fifth.

Pascua then lost 15 of his next 24 fights, including defeats at the hands of Samson Dutch Boy Gym, Gerry Penalosa (who thus avenged his brother Dodie's earlier loss to Pascua), Raffy Montalban in defense of Pascua's PGAB's national super-flyweight title, and Johnny Bredahl in a challenge for the minority recognized, International Boxing Organization bantamweight title (a first-round knockout loss) on March 29, 1996, at the Brøndby Halle in Brøndby, Denmark. Pascua was also defeated by Veerapol Sahaprom.

Pascua's final fight as a professional came against 7–2 Mapichit Utaiawee, a boxer Pascua had previously defeated, but on September 12, 1999, Utaiawee outpointed Pascua over twelve rounds, causing Pascua to retire afterward and never return to professional boxing.

== Professional boxing record ==
70 fights	45 wins	25 losses
By knockout	17	12
By decision	28	13

No.	Result	Record	Opponent	Type	Round, Time	Date	Location	Notes
70	Loss	45–25	Mapichit Uttaitawee	PTS	12	12 Sep 1999	Pattaya, Thailand	
69	Loss	45–24	Rey Llagas	TKO	5 (10), 2:10	5 Mar 1999	Mandaluyong City, Metro Manila, Philippines	
68	Loss	45–23	Tomohito Higashijima	SD	10	18 Oct 1998	Kurume, Fukuoka, Japan	
67	Loss	45–22	Puma Toguchi	SD	10	29 Jun 1998	Korakuen Hall, Tokyo, Japan	
66	Loss	45–21	Saen Sor Ploenchit	UD	10	1 May 1998	Kanchanaburi Province Stadium, Kanchanaburi, Thailand	
65	Win	45–20	Mapichit Uttaitawee	KO	6 (6)	27 Feb 1998	Specially Built Arena, Ko Samui, Thailand	
64	Loss	44–20	Masahiko Nakamura	KO	2 (10), 2:20	10 Jan 1998	Korakuen Hall, Tokyo, Japan	
63	Loss	44–19	Loon Pantasi	TKO	8 (10)	21 Nov 1997	Sawananan School, Sawankhalok, Sukhothai, Thailand	
62	Win	44–18	Juanito Boy Cuma	UD	10	2 Oct 1997	Imus Plaza Covered Court, Imus, Philippines	
61	Win	43–18	Archie Anoos	SD	10	30 Aug 1997	Mandaue City, Cebu, Philippines	
60	Loss	42–18	Anupong Saohin Srisuk	UD	10	6 Jun 1997	Nakornthong Parkview, Bangbuathong, Thailand	
59	Loss	42–17	Veeraphol Sahaprom	UD	10	7 Apr 1997	New Worlde Shopping Center, Nonthaburi, Thailand	
58	Win	42–16	Kasamana Silehu	TKO	5 (10)	10 Mar 1997	Traders Hotel, Manila, Philippines	
57	Loss	41–16	Loon Pantasi	TKO	8 (10)	22 Nov 1996	Provincial Stadium, Surin, Thailand	
56	Loss	41–15	Johnny Bredahl	KO	1 (12)	29 Mar 1996	Brøndbyhallen, Brøndby, Denmark	For IBO bantamweight title
55	Loss	41–14	Raffy Montalban	TKO	10 (12)	9 Feb 1996	Mandaluyong City, Metro Manila, Philippines	Lost PGAB super flyweight title
54	Win	41–13	Juanito Boy Cuma	UD	12	28 Sep 1995	Araneta Center, Quezon City, Philippines	Retained PGAB super flyweight title
53	Win	40–13	Suvatchai Chalermsri	UD	10	8 Jul 1995	Araneta Center, Quezon City, Philippines	
52	Loss	39–13	Gerry Peñalosa	KO	8 (10), 1:40	8 Apr 1995	Cebu Coliseum, Cebu City, Philippines	
51	Loss	39–12	Samson Dutch Boy Gym	KO	8 (12), 2:28	8 Jan 1995	Central Stadium, Phrae Thailand	
50	Win	39–11	Anupong Saohin Srisuk	UD	10	10 Dec 1994	General Santos City, Cotabato del Sur, Philippines	
49	Win	38–11	Kid Refamonte	TKO	6 (12)	30 Sep 1994	Araneta Coliseum, Barangay Cubao, Quezon City, Philippines	Retained PGAB super flyweight title
48	Loss	37–11	Thanomsak Sithbaobay	TKO	4 (10)	23 Apr 1994	Channel 7 Studios, Bangkok, Thailand	
47	Win	37–10	Mauro Saucelo	UD	12	19 Feb 1994	Tagum City, Davao del Norte, Philippines	Retained PGAB super flyweight title
46	Loss	36–10	In Shik Go	SD	12	30 Jan 1994	Prince Hotel, Daegu, South Korea	For vacant OPBF super flyweight title
45	Loss	36–9	Julio César Borboa	TKO	5 (12), 2:58	16 Nov 1993	Coliseo, Hermosillo, Mexico	For IBF super flyweight title
44	Win	36–8	Hiroshi Kobayashi	UD	10	15 Oct 1993	Morioka, Iwate, Japan	
43	Win	35–8	Dodie Boy Peñalosa Sr.	UD	10	17 Jul 1993	Cuneta Astrodome, Pasay City, Philippines	
42	Loss	34–8	Chatchai Sasakul	UD	12	28 Apr 1993	Bangkok, Thailand	For WBC International flyweight title
41	Win	34–7	Rey Paciones	TKO	12 (12)	20 Feb 1993	Tagum City, Davao del Norte	Won PGAB super flyweight title
40	Win	33–7	Yuiknari Oshiro	TKO	9 (10)	10 Dec 1992	Hirosaki, Aomori, Japan	
39	Win	32–7	Toshio Aikawa	TKO	9 (10), 1:05	14 Nov 1992	Ōdate, Akita, Japan	
38	Loss	31–7	Yoon Un Jin	KO	7 (10), 2:44	23 Aug 1992	Munhwa Gymnasium, Seoul, South Korea	
37	Win	31–6	Edwin Projo	UD	10	18 Jul 1992	Bansud, Mindoro Oriental, Philippines	
36	Win	30–6	Chang Kyu Chang	TD	8 (10)	18 Jan 1992	Araneta Coliseum, Barangay Cubao, Quezon City, Philippines	
35	Win	29–6	Kaaj Chartbandit	UD	10	26 Oct 1991	Baguio College Foundation Gym, Baguio, Philippines	
34	Win	28–6	Mario Parcon	KO	2 (10)	21 Sep 1991	Urdaneta City, Pangasinan, Philippines	
33	Win	27–6	Rocky Marcial	PTS	10	20 Jul 1991	Cebu, Philippines	
32	Win	26–6	Michael Ebo Danquah	TKO	3 (10), 0:57	15 Jun 1991	Cebu Coliseum, Cebu City, Philippines	
31	Loss	25–6	Melchor Cob Castro	TKO	10 (12), 1:59	25 Mar 1991	Great Western Forum, Inglewood, California, U.S.	Lost WBC light flyweight title
30	Win	25–5	Humberto González	KO	6 (12), 2:24	19 Dec 1990	Great Western Forum, Inglewood, California, U.S.	Won WBC light flyweight title
29	Win	24–5	Jaime Banggot	UD	10	21 Jul 1990	Tagum City, Davao del Norte, Philippines	
28	Win	23–5	Ernie Gulla	TKO	3 (10)	27 Apr 1990	Pasay City Sports Complex, Pasay City, Philippines	
27	Loss	22–5	Napa Kiatwanchai	UD	10	30 Jan 1990	Lumpinee Boxing Stadium, Bangkok, Thailand	
26	Win	22–4	Fernando Baja	TKO	9 (10)	30 Dec 1989	Mambajao, Camiguin, Philippines	
25	Win	21–4	Obet Maamo	UD	10	30 Nov 1989	Angeles City, Pampanga, Philippines	
24	Win	20–4	Warlito Franco	UD	10	30 Sep 1989	General Santos City, Cotabato del Sur, Philippines	
23	Loss	19–4	Rey Paciones	UD	10	19 Aug 1989	Tagum City, Davao del Norte, Philippines	
22	Win	19–3	Joseph Pacling	TKO	3 (10)	6 May 1989	Don Pacoy Ortega Gym, San Fernando City, Philippines	
21	Win	18–3	Roger de Rama	MD	10	1 Mar 1989	Elorde Sports Center, Parañaque City, Philippines	
20	Loss	17–3	Rolando Protacio	UD	8	23 Dec 1988	Rizal Memorial Coliseum, Manila, Philippines	
19	Loss	17–2	Paul Badilla	UD	10	26 Nov 1988	University of Baguio Gym, Baguio City, Philippines	
18	Win	17–1	Jun Altarejos	TKO	6 (10)	30 Sep 1988	Rizal Memorial Coliseum, Manila, Philippines	
17	Win	16–1	Romy Austria	TKO	9 (10)	28 Aug 1988	Marikina City, Metro Manila, Philippines	
16	Win	15–1	Triffon Torralba	UD	10	20 Feb 1988	Tagum City, Davao del Norte, Philippines	
15	Loss	14–1	Choi Jum-hwan	SD	10	28 Jan 1988	Seoul, South Korea	
14	Win	14–0	Simson Tana	UD	10	16 Dec 1987	Rizal Memorial Sports Complex, Manila, Philippines	
13	Win	13–0	Cris Ramos	TKO	4 (10)	24 Oct 1987	Balanga City, Bataan, Philippines	
12	Win	12–0	Leopard Ari	UD	10	5 Sep 1987	Araneta Coliseum, Barangay Cubao, Quezon City, Philippines	
11	Win	11–0	Mario Parcon	UD	10	30 Aug 1987	Balanga City, Bataan, Philippines	
10	Win	10–0	Emil Romano	UD	10	27 Jun 1987	Rizal Memorial Sports Complex, Manila, Philippines	
9	Win	9–0	Perez Junior	UD	10	9 Apr 1987	Olongapo City, Zambales, Philippines	
8	Win	8–0	Ross Canedo	UD	10	21 Feb 1987	Naic, Cavite, Philippines	
7	Win	7–0	Mario Aliguin	TKO	5 (8)	31 Jan 1987	Elorde Sports Center, Parañaque City, Philippines	
6	Win	6–0	Mario Aliguin	UD	8	27 Dec 1986	Elorde Sports Center, Parañaque City, Philippines	
5	Win	5–0	Bobby Arcillas	MD	8	16 Dec 1986	Rizal Memorial Coliseum, Manila, Philippines	
4	Win	4–0	Felix Benedicto	UD	6	15 Nov 1986	Cabiao, Nueva Ecija, Philippines	
3	Win	3–0	Roger de Rama	MD	6	23 Oct 1986	Pasay City Sports Complex, Pasay City, Philippines	
2	Win	2–0	Mel Perez	TKO	2 (4)	12 Sep 1986	International Youth Center, Olongapo City, Philippines	
1	Win	1–0	Eddie Dulay	UD	4	3 Aug 1986	Pasay City Sports Complex, Pasay City, Philippines	
