= Napa Kiatwanchai =

Thai boxer (born 1967)

Napa Kiatwanchai นภา เกียรติวันชัย
Personal information
- Nationality: Thai
- Born: Suwit Sae-tang (สุวิทย์ แซ่ตั้ง); July 27, 1967 (age 59) Chok Chai District, Nakhon Ratchasima Province, Thailand
- Weight: Strawweight; Light flyweight

Boxing career
- Stance: Southpaw

Boxing record
- Total fights: 25
- Wins: 16
- Win by KO: 8
- Losses: 8
- Draws: 1

Napa Kiatwanchai (born July 27, 1967) is the former Lineal and WBC strawweight champion from Nakorn Rachasima (Korat) province, Thailand.

== Career ==
He was born in a Thai-Chinese family in Nakhon Ratchasima and turned professional in 1987. He started training in Muay Thai as a child, he competed on the Bangkok circuit until the age of 20 under the ring name Chokchaichew Na Pattaya (โชคชัยจิ๋ว ณ พัทยา). He transitioned to boxing in 1987 and fought Hiroki Ioka a year later for the Lineal and WBC strawweight titles. The bout ended in a draw and in the rematch Kiatwanchai won the title by a twelve-round majority decision. He defended the title twice before losing to Jum-Hwan Choi on November 12, 1989. He beat future champion Rolando Pascua before challenging for the WBC title again, on June 8, 1990. He lost to champion Hideyuki Ohashi by a twelve-round unanimous decision. His final try at the title came in 1992, when Humberto González knocked him out in defense of González's WBC light flyweight title.

Napa stopped boxing in 1992 but made a comeback in 1996. He only won one fight during this comeback and retired for good in 2000.

Prior to the Ioka fight, Napa had only six professional fights and no amateur experience. He was expected merely to help extend the reign of champion Hiroki Ioka, so he was sent to Japan with only his trainer, Kunoi Withichai. It was just the two of them. Early in the fight, Napa was knocked down for an eight count, but he bounced back and kept fighting. By the halfway point of the 12th round, Ioka appeared close to being knocked out when the bell suddenly rang, seemingly to save the champion.

Before this fight, Napa fought under the name Chokchaichew. The name Napa Kiatwanchai had originally been reserved for Muangchai Kittikasem, a future IBF and WBC champion. However, Muangchai (or "Napa", as he was intended to be) was not yet ready, so the manager substituted Chokchaichew in his place. From that point on, he fought under the name Napa Kiatwanchai.

According to Napa, after that fight, in which the decision was widely disputed, a group of Thais, including taxi drivers and tuk-tuk drivers, most of whom were from the Isan region, went so far as to stage a protest in front of the Japanese Embassy in Thailand, on Witthayu Road, opposite Lumphini Park.

=== After fighting ===
Life after fighting has been difficult for Napa. He had no savings due to lavish spending and a gambling addiction. These days, he makes a living by singing in nightclubs and restaurants. He also suffers from vision problems and was left permanently blind as a result of the fight against González in 1992. Many years later, his life began to improve when he became a Muay Thai and professional boxing trainer at a gym on Rattanathibet Road, which is affiliated with a Japanese boxing gym. He gave up his singing career, and his health gradually improved, although his eyesight remained a concern. Nevertheless, he continued to take medication regularly to manage his condition. As for his personal life, he had been married several times before eventually deciding not to pursue another relationship.

== Professional boxing record ==
25 fights	16 wins	8 losses
By knockout	8	6
By decision	8	2
Draws	1	

No.	Result	Record	Opponent	Type	Round, time	Date	Location	Notes
25	Loss	16–8–1	Yoshiaki Matsukura	TKO	6 (10)	28 Oct 2000	Differ Ariake, Tokyo, Japan	
24	Loss	16–7–1	Koji Fujiwara	TKO	6	21 Oct 1999	Osaka, Japan	
23	Loss	16–6–1	Katsushige Kawashima	RTD	5 (10), 3:00	28 Apr 1999	Bunka Gym, Yokohama, Japan	
22	Loss	16–5–1	Tetsutora Senrima	UD	10	14 Dec 1997	Sambo Hall, Kobe, Japan	
21	Win	16–4–1	Unknown	PTS	8	24 Oct 1996	Temporary Outdoor Stadium, Sakon Nakhon, Thailand	
20	Loss	15–4–1	Ala Villamor	KO	2	20 Nov 1992	Tokyo Metropolitan Gymnasium, Tokyo, Japan	
19	Loss	15–3–1	Humberto González	KO	2 (12), 2:48	14 Sep 1992	Great Western Forum, Inglewood, California, U.S.	For WBC light flyweight title
18	Win	15–2–1	Victor Gestupa	KO	3	10 Jul 1992	Bangkok, Thailand	
17	Win	14–2–1	Sugar Ray Mike	TKO	7	24 Dec 1991	Bangkok, Thailand	
16	Win	13–2–1	Chon Pil Park	PTS	10	5 Oct 1991	Bangkok, Thailand	
15	Win	12–2–1	Jaime Aliguin	TKO	6	27 Jul 1990	Pattaya, Thailand	
14	Loss	11–2–1	Hideyuki Ohashi	UD	12	8 Jun 1990	Korakuen Hall, Tokyo, Japan	For WBC strawweight title
13	Win	11–1–1	Rolando Pascua	UD	10	30 Jan 1990	Lumpinee Boxing Stadium, Bangkok, Thailand	
12	Loss	10–1–1	Choi Jum-hwan	TKO	12 (12), 1:18	12 Nov 1989	World Trade Center Seoul, Seoul, South Korea	Lost WBC strawweight title
11	Win	10–0–1	Hiroki Ioka	TKO	11 (12), 1:12	10 Jun 1989	Osaka Prefectural Gymnasium, Osaka, Japan	Retained WBC strawweight title
10	Win	9–0–1	John Arief	UD	12	11 Feb 1989	Provincial Stadium, Nakhon Ratchasima, Thailand	Retained WBC strawweight title
9	Win	8–0–1	Hiroki Ioka	MD	12	13 Nov 1988	Osaka Prefectural Gymnasium, Osaka, Japan	Won WBC strawweight title
8	Win	7–0–1	Thanjai Donjadee	TKO	3	4 Sep 1988	Bangkok, Thailand	
7	Draw	6–0–1	Hiroki Ioka	SD	12	5 Jun 1988	Kinki University Auditorium, Osaka, Japan	For WBC strawweight title
6	Win	6–0	Gim Suryaman	MD	12	16 Apr 1988	Gajayana Stadium, Malang, Indonesia	Retained WBC International strawweight title
5	Win	5–0	Nico Thomas	SD	12	26 Jan 1988	Stardust Discotheque, Jakarta, Indonesia	Won vacant WBC International strawweight title
4	Win	4–0	Jomyuth Sithseemok	TKO	5	21 Nov 1987	Bangkok, Thailand	
3	Win	3–0	Sornchai Kiatsonthaya	TKO	2	3 Nov 1987	Bangkok, Thailand	
2	Win	2–0	Sukhum Sithfakamron	KO	2	29 Sep 1987	Bangkok, Thailand	
1	Win	1–0	Jompichit Kiattawatchai	PTS	6	7 Aug 1987	Bangkok, Thailand	

== Muay Thai record ==
Muay Thai record
Date	Result	Opponent	Event	Location	Method	Round	Time
1987-06-12	Loss	(Thailand) Kwan-ek Kiatphetnoi		Bangkok, Thailand	Decision	5	3:00
1987-05-07	Loss	(Thailand) Wannarong Sor. Kiattisak	Rajadamnern Stadium	Bangkok, Thailand	Decision	5	3:00
1986-	Loss	(Thailand) Channoi Sor.Weerakul		Nakhon Ratchasima province, Thailand	Decision	5	3:00
1986-	Win	(Thailand) Tengja Phonthawee		Nakhon Ratchasima province, Thailand	Decision	5	3:00
1986-07-01	NC	(Thailand) Seesot Sor.Ritthichai		Bangkok, Thailand	Napa dismissed	4	
1986-05-02	Loss	(Thailand) Wiratnoi Kiattiratphon		Bangkok, Thailand	Decision	5	3:00
1986-03-21	Win	(Thailand) Kritsada Lukrangsi		Bangkok, Thailand	KO	4	
1986-02-28	Win	(Thailand) Kritsada Lukrangsi		Bangkok, Thailand	Decision	5	3:00
1986-02-05	Loss	(Thailand) Suasaming Sitchang	Rajadamnern Stadium	Bangkok, Thailand	Decision	5	3:00
1985-12-13	Win	(Thailand) Jakraphetnoi Sor.Ploenchit		Bangkok, Thailand	referee stop	4	
1985-10-25	Loss	(Thailand) Jockynoi Na Nongkhae		Bangkok, Thailand	Decision	5	3:00
1985-04-05	Win	(Thailand) Dennuea Denmolee		Chiang Mai, Thailand	Decision	5	3:00
1985-03-04	Loss	(Thailand) Nongoern Sor.Paiboon		Bangkok, Thailand	Decision	5	3:00
1985-01-22	Win	(Thailand) Numchingchai Kittikasem		Bangkok, Thailand	KO	2	
Legend: Win Loss Draw/No contest Notes

== See also ==
- List of WBC world champions

Achievements
Preceded by Hiroki Ioka	WBC Minimumweight Champion; 13 Nov 1988–12 Nov 1989	Succeeded by Jum-Hwan Choi
