= Saman Sorjaturong =

Thai boxer

Saman Sorjaturong (สมาน ส.จาตุรงค์)
Personal information
- Nationality: Thai
- Born: Saman Sriprated (สมาน ศรีประเทศ); August 2, 1968 (age 57) Amphoe Khlong Lan, Kamphaeng Phet province, Thailand
- Weight: Junior flyweight

Boxing career
- Stance: Orthodox

Boxing record
- Total fights: 55
- Wins: 46
- Win by KO: 34
- Losses: 8
- Draws: 1

Saman Sorjaturong (born Saman Sriprated on 2 August 1968 in Amphoe Khlong Lan, Kamphaeng Phet province) is a Thai former world boxing champion.

== Early life ==
He was born into a poor farming family in Kamphaeng Phet province, located in the upper central of Thailand. He was one of four siblings. Due to the family's poverty, he did not grow up with his parents, who had to move to another village in search of better opportunities. As a child, he was ordained as a novice monk and went to live at a temple with his grandfather, who was also a monk. He remained there until he completed his primary education, finishing grade six.

Later, he continued his Buddhist studies at Wat Pho in Bangkok, where he spent five years in monastic education. During that time, he successfully completed the third level of the Pāli studies examination, earning the title Maha, a respectful prefix granted to monks who reach this academic level.

== Boxing career ==
Saman turned pro at the age of 21, which was considered quite old for a boxer. Motivated by his passion for professional boxing, he had written a letter seeking help from M.R. Naris Kridakorn, the editor of World Boxing Magazine. In response, M.R. Naris recommended that he go to "Sorjaturong Boxing Gym" that run by Suchart Theerawuttichuwong, who was both the owner and the head trainer at the time.

Saman won the WBC, IBF and lineal junior flyweight titles during his career. He would later go on to make history as the third Thai boxer to win a world championship title without ever having competed in Muay Thai. (the first being Pone Kingpetch, and the second being Chartchai Chionoi).

He became the first Thai and Asian boxer to hold world titles from two major sanctioning bodies simultaneously, a record he still holds today. Before that achievement, he had been seen merely as an ordinary fighter, lacking the potential to become a world champion. In 1993, he challenged the undefeated Mexican champion Ricardo López for the WBC strawweight title. However, the bout ended in disappointment, as he was defeated in just the second round.

He defeated reigning champion Humberto González in a thrilling fight that was named Ring Magazine's Fight of the Year in 1995 to win the IBF and WBC titles. Both fighters were knocked down twice during the fight. He defended his IBF and WBC titles simultaneously only once, during his first title defense, before immediately relinquishing the IBF belt as a gesture of loyalty to the WBC, in line with his manager’s intentions. He went on to successfully defend the WBC portion ten consecutive times, before eventually losing to Yo Sam Choi of South Korea in 1999 via a unanimous decision. Their rematch was postponed seven times before it finally took place in 2001, when he was knocked out in the seventh round. He retired from boxing in 2005 after being knocked out in the first round by a Japanese Kōki Kameda.

== Life after boxing ==
After retirement, he opened a Khao man kai (Thai version of Hainanese chicken rice) and Khao mu daeng (rice with red pork) restaurant, a family business that had been passed down long before his boxing career, in Ban Fah Lagoon Village, Rangsit, Pathumthani, where he still resides today.

== Professional boxing record ==
| 55 fights | 45 wins | 8 losses |
|---|---|---|
| By knockout | 36 | 4 |
| By decision | 9 | 4 |
| Draws | 2 | |

| No. | Result | Record | Opponent | Type | Round | Date | Location | Notes |
|---|---|---|---|---|---|---|---|---|
| 55 | Loss | 45–8–2 | Kōki Kameda | KO | 1(10) | Jun 20, 2005 | Korakuen Hall, Tokyo, Japan | |
| 54 | Loss | 45–7–2 | Rodel Quilaton | UD | 6 | Apr 16, 2005 | The Mall Shopping Center Bangkae, Bangkok, Thailand | |
| 53 | Loss | 45–6–2 | Pitakpong Thamma | TKO | 4(12) | Feb 22, 2005 | Chaophraya pier, Pathum Thani, Thailand | |
| 52 | Loss | 45–5–2 | Wyndel Janiola | UD | 10 | Apr 11, 2002 | Princess Crown Hotel, Paoy Paet, Cambodia | |
| 51 | Win | 45–4–2 | Koki Tanaka | TKO | 3(10) | Feb 2, 2002 | Korakuen Hall, Tokyo, Japan | |
| 50 | Loss | 44–4–2 | Choi Yo-sam | KO | 7(12) | Jan 30, 2001 | Bangkok City, Thailand | For WBC light-flyweight titles |
| 49 | Win | 44–3–2 | Alvin Felicilda | UD | 10 | Jul 19, 2000 | Bangkok City, Thailand | |
| 48 | Win | 43–3–2 | Ramil Anito | KO | 6(10) | Mar 11, 2000 | Bangkok City, Thailand | |
| 47 | Win | 42–3–2 | Alfren Bulala | KO | 4(8) | Mar 11, 2000 | Sa Kaeo, Thailand | |
| 46 | Win | 41–3–2 | Rogelio Lapi-an | KO | 3(8) | Feb 11, 2000 | Mahachai Villa Arena, Samut Sakhon, Thailand | |
| 45 | Loss | 40–3–2 | Choi Yo-sam | UD | 12 | Occt 17, 1999 | Olympic Park Gymnasium, Seoul, South Korea | Lost WBC light-flyweight titles |
| 44 | Draw | 40–2–2 | Texas Gomez | TD | 5(12) | May 19, 1999 | Bangkok City, Thailand | |
| 43 | Win | 40–2–1 | Ladislao Vazquez | UD | 12 | Nov 26, 1998 | Muang Thong Thani Sports Complex, Nonthaburi, Thailand | Retained WBC light-flyweight titles |
| 42 | Win | 39–2–1 | Ramil Gevero | PTS | 10 | Aug 19, 1998 | Bangkok City, Thailand | |
| 41 | Win | 38–2–1 | Shiro Yahiro | TKO | 4(12) | Mar 8, 1998 | Yokohama Arena, Yokohama, Japan | Retained WBC light-flyweight titles |
| 40 | Win | 37–2–1 | Ernesto Rubillar | TKO | 7(10) | Dec 17, 1997 | Channel 7 Studios, Bangkok, Thailand | |
| 39 | Win | 36–2–1 | Mzukisi Marali | TKO | 4(12) | May 31, 1997 | Garden Hill Village, Bungsampan, Petchaboon, Thailand | Retained WBC light-flyweight titles |
| 38 | Win | 35–2–1 | Julio Coronel | TKO | 7(12) | Apr 13, 1997 | Chaiyaphum Stadium, Chaiyaphum, Thailand | Retained WBC light-flyweight titles |
| 37 | Win | 34–2–1 | Manuel Jesus Herrera | UD | 12 | Dec 15, 1996 | Provincial Stadium, Chiang Rai, Thailand | Retained WBC light-flyweight titles |
| 36 | Win | 33–2–1 | Alli Galvez | TKO | 2(12) | Sep 19, 1996 | Bangplee Regional Stadium, Samut Prakan, Thailand | Retained WBC light-flyweight titles |
| 35 | Win | 32–2–1 | Shiro Yahiro | TKO | 9(12) | Aug 10, 1996 | Soccer Stadium, Phitsanulok, Thailand | Retained WBC light-flyweight titles |
| 34 | Win | 31–2–1 | Bonifacio Terado | PTS | 6 | Jun 7, 1996 | Panpiset School, Pan District, Chiang Rai, Thailand | |
| 33 | Win | 30–2–1 | Joma Gamboa | TKO | 7(12) | Apr 27, 1996 | Regional Stadium, Maha Sarakham, Thailand | Retained WBC light-flyweight titles |
| 32 | Win | 29–2–1 | Antonio Pérez | TKO | 4(12) | Feb 24, 1996 | Municipal Stadium, Chachoengsao, Thailand | Retained WBC light-flyweight titles |
| 31 | Win | 28–2–1 | Yuichi Hosono | KO | 4(12) | Nov 12, 1995 | Main Stadium, Ratchaburi, Thailand | Retained WBC, and IBF light-flyweight titles |
| 30 | Win | 27–2–1 | Humberto González | TKO | 7(12) | Jul 15, 1995 | Great Western Forum, Inglewood, USA | Won WBC, and IBF light-flyweight titles |
| 29 | Win | 26–2–1 | David Franco | KO | 6(10) | May 18, 1995 | Bangkok City, Thailand | |
| 28 | Win | 25–2–1 | Alexis Janiola | KO | 4(10) | Mar 15, 1995 | Channel 7 Studios, Bangkok, Thailand | |
| 27 | Win | 24–2–1 | Al Tarazona | UD | 10 | Feb 15, 1995 | Channel 7 Studios, Bangkok, Thailand | |
| 26 | Win | 23–2–1 | Edwin Talita | PTS | 10 | Dec 21, 1994 | Channel 7 Studios, Bangkok, Thailand | |
| 25 | Win | 22–2–1 | Rico Macaubos | KO | 3(?) | Oct 12, 1994 | Channel 7 Studios, Bangkok, Thailand | |
| 24 | Win | 21–2–1 | David Franco | PTS | 10 | Aug 14, 1994 | Channel 7 Studios, Bangkok, Thailand | |
| 23 | Win | 20–2–1 | Alpong Navaja | KO | 4(?) | Jun 15, 1994 | Channel 7 Studios, Bangkok, Thailand | |
| 22 | Win | 19–2–1 | Jaime Aliguin | KO | 3(?) | Apr 20, 1994 | Channel 7 Studios, Bangkok, Thailand | |
| 21 | Win | 18–2–1 | Sammy Tyson Pagadan | KO | 5(?) | Feb 16, 1994 | Channel 7 Studios, Bangkok, Thailand | |
| 20 | Win | 17–2–1 | John Medina | KO | 4(?) | Dec 15, 1993 | Bangkok City, Thailand | |
| 19 | Win | 16–2–1 | Bernardo Belamucho | KO | 4(?) | Sep 15, 1993 | Bangkok City, Thailand | |
| 18 | Loss | 15–2–1 | Ricardo López | KO | 2(12) | Jul 3, 1993 | Parc de Beisbol La Junta, Nuevo Laredo, Mexico | For WBC minimumweight title |
| 17 | Win | 15–1–1 | Aswin Sithlakmuang | KO | 8(?) | Jan 17, 1993 | Bangkok City, Thailand | |
| 16 | Loss | 14–1–1 | Aswin Sithlakmuang | PTS | 6 | Aug 25, 1992 | Bangkok City, Thailand | |
| 15 | Draw | 14–0–1 | Roberto Padilla | PTS | 10 | Jul 10, 1992 | Bangkok City, Thailand | |
| 14 | Win | 14–0 | Suk Hang Jae | KO | 3(?) | Apr 3, 1992 | Bangkok City, Thailand | |
| 13 | Win | 13–0 | Nilo Anosa | KO | 2(?) | Dec 14, 1991 | Bangkok City, Thailand | |
| 12 | Win | 12–0 | Aswin Singnakloea | KO | 1(?) | Oct 5, 1991 | Bangkok City, Thailand | |
| 11 | Win | 11–0 | Darwin M | KO | 7(?) | Jul 14, 1991 | Bangkok City, Thailand | |
| 10 | Win | 10–0 | Pepe Sitharan | KO | 1(?) | Jun 11, 1991 | Bangkok City, Thailand | |
| 9 | Win | 9–0 | Putlek Ohyuthanakorn | KO | 3(?) | May 14, 1991 | Bangkok City, Thailand | |
| 8 | Win | 8–0 | Tutachai Lukpintorn | KO | 1(?) | Mar 8, 1991 | Bangkok City, Thailand | |
| 7 | Win | 7–0 | Bangpleenoi Poryontrakit | KO | 2(?) | Feb 23, 1991 | Bangkok City, Thailand | |
| 6 | Win | 6–0 | Rome Chaalorton | PTS | 4 | Nov 18, 1990 | Bangkok City, Thailand | |
| 5 | Win | 5–0 | Bunlert Sorkettalingche | KO | 4(?) | Aug 22, 1990 | Bangkok City, Thailand | |
| 4 | Win | 4–0 | Lui Singsuannam | KO | 5(?) | Jul 23, 1990 | Bangkok City, Thailand | |
| 3 | Win | 3–0 | Panom Chorungsak | KO | 1(?) | Jun 17, 1990 | Bangkok City, Thailand | |
| 2 | Win | 2–0 | Kongkwan Lukmaoklong | PTS | 4 | Apr 8, 1990 | Bangkok City, Thailand | |
| 1 | Win | 1–0 | Ekawit Singkrungthon | KO | 4 | Des 24, 1989 | Bangkok City, Thailand | |

== See also ==
- List of light flyweight boxing champions
- List of WBC world champions
- List of IBF world champions

Sporting positions
| Preceded by Humberto González | Lineal Light Flyweight Champion; 15 July 1995 – 17 October 1999 | Succeeded by Yo-Sam Choi |
| Preceded by Humberto González | WBC Light Flyweight Champion; 15 July 1995 – 17 October 1999 | Succeeded by Yo-Sam Choi |
| Preceded by Humberto González | IBF Light Flyweight Champion; 15 July 1995 – 17 November 1996; Stripped | Succeeded by Michael Carbajal |
Awards
| Previous: Jorge Castro KO9 John David Jackson | The Ring Magazine Fight of the Year; KO7 Humberto González; 1995 | Next: Evander Holyfield KO11 Mike Tyson |
| Previous: Castro vs. Jackson; Round 9 | The Ring Magazine Round of the Year; Round 7 vs. Humberto González; 1995 | Next: Frankie Liles vs Tim Littles; Round 3 |
