= Kunoi Vithichai =

Thai boxer (1933–2008)

Personal information
- Nicknames: Ai-Yuh (ไอ้หยู) "Mr. Yuh"
- Nationality: Thai
- Born: Kunoi Mahattapong (กู้น้อย มหัตถพงศ์); Aeayuh Sae-heng (เอี้ยหยู แซ่เฮ้ง) (formerly); November 6, 1933 Yaowarat, Bangkok, Thailand
- Died: January 3, 2008 (aged 74) Bangkok, Thailand
- Weight: Flyweight

Boxing career
- Stance: Orthodox

Boxing record
- Total fights: 18
- Wins: 8
- Win by KO: 6
- Losses: 10
- Draws: 0
- No contests: 0

Kunoi Vithichai (Thai: กู้น้อย วิถีชัย; November 6, 1933 – January 3, 2008) was a Thai former professional boxer. He fought in the flyweight division from 1954 to 1960.

== Biography and career ==
Kunoi was born on November 6, 1933, in Bangkok's Yaowarat neighbourhood to overseas Chinese immigrants living in Thailand. He had the birth name in Chinese "Aeayuh Sae-heng" (เอี้ยหยู แซ่เฮ้ง).

He fought under the names "Kimyuh Vithichai" (กิมหยู วิถีชัย) and "Kunoi Vithichai" under Vithichai Boxing Gym by Chit Ampongsin as a trainer. He started with Muay Thai by fighting regularly at Rajadamnern Stadium and later switched to professional boxing.

He fought Pone Kingpetch, Thailand's first boxing world champion, three times in 1956. In the first fight, he won by TKO (Pone's brows were cut since the fifth round) in the seventh round and won the Rajadamnern Stadium flyweight title. He was defeated in the second fight by sixth-round knockout to the ground in front of Lumpinee Park. In the last fight, he was defeated by points decision over the 10 rounds, losing the Rajadamnern Stadium flyweight championship.

Later, he had three unsuccessful attempts at the OPBF flyweight title. He also had two special fights against Chartchai Chionoi before his retirement in 1962.

Kunoi was a boxer with an aggressive fighting style, many times fighting opponents from a bigger weight class than him.

After Pone Kingpetch became world flyweight champion, he stated in an interview that Kunoi Vithichai was his best opponent, as opposed to Pascual Pérez or Fighting Harada.

== Retirement and death ==
After retirement, he worked as a taxi driver for a while. Later, he worked as a driver for the Daily News newspaper and Charoen Pokphand Company (CP). In the boxing community, he was a trainer for three Thai boxers who later became world champions: Saensak Muangsurin, Napa Kiatwanchai and Muangchai Kittikasem.

He had four children: three sons and one daughter. His daughter, Busaba "TaNgaew" Mahattapong, was a famous and very popular Channel V Thailand's VJ in the 90s.

Kunoi died on January 3, 2008, from Alzheimer's disease that lasted more than four years at 74 years old. His official boxing record is 8–10–0 (6KOs). However, his record from his personal account is 77–14–4.

== Title and honour ==
- Rajadamnern Stadium Flyweight Champion (112 lbs) (1956)
- Victory Jacket from Sports Authority of Thailand (SAT)
