= Juan Domingo Córdoba =

Argentine boxer

Personal information
- Nickname: Panza
- Born: August 6, 1972 (age 53) Santiago del Estero, Argentina
- Height: 5 ft 3 in (160 cm)
- Weight: Light flyweight; Flyweight

Boxing career
- Reach: 60 in (152 cm)
- Stance: Orthodox

Boxing record
- Total fights: 43
- Wins: 34
- Win by KO: 19
- Losses: 6
- Draws: 3

Juan Domingo Córdoba (born 6 August 1972 in Santiago del Estero, Argentina) is a former professional boxer who was a world champion at the light flyweight (108 lb) division.

== Pro career ==
Córdoba turned pro in 1992 and went 19-1-1 in his first 21 fights, winning in the process the Argentinean, South American and WBC International light-flyweight titles. He challenged Humberto González for the WBC and IBF light-flyweight world titles in 1994, losing by a technical knockout in the 7th round. A second world title attempt in 1997 was also unsuccessful when he lost to Thai Chatchai Sasakul in 1997 for the interim WBC flyweight title. A year later he went down again to light-flyweight and had a successful world title fight for the WBO title against Melchor Cob Castro in his native Santiago del Estero. He would defend the title once in his hometown before losing it to Mexican Jorge Arce in Tijuana in 1998. He retired from boxing after the fight though he would come back again in late 2000. In 2001 he challenged Fernando Montiel for the world WBO flyweight title but suffered a first round KO in Acapulco, which resulted in his final professional bout.

== Professional boxing record ==
43 fights	34 wins	6 losses
By knockout	19	4
By decision	15	2
Draws	3	

No.	Result	Record	Opponent	Type	Round, time	Date	Location	Notes
43	Loss	34–6–3	Fernando Montiel	KO	1 (12)	2001-05-25	Discoteca El Alebrije, Acapulco, Mexico	For WBO flyweight title
42	Win	34–5–3	Dario Azuaga	SD	10 (10)	2001-02-17	Gimnasio Ian Bartney, Oberá, Argentina	
41	Win	33–5–3	Juan Carlos Cazon	KO	4 (10)	2000-11-17	Santiago del Estero, Argentina	
40	Loss	32–5–3	Jorge Arce	UD	12 (12)	1998-12-05	Auditorio Municipal, Tijuana, Mexico	Lost WBO light-flyweight title
39	Win	32–4–3	Sandro Orlando Oviedo	UD	12 (12)	1998-05-09	Club Juventud, Santiago del Estero, Argentina	Retained WBO light-flyweight title
38	Win	31–4–3	Melchor Cob Castro	UD	12 (12)	1998-01-17	Club Ciclista Olímpico, La Banda, Argentina	Won WBO light-flyweight title
37	Win	30–4–3	Jorge Raul Faria Paez	KO	4 (10)	1997-12-12	Buenos Aires, Argentina	
36	Draw	29–4–3	Adrian Cristian Ochoa	PTS	6 (6)	1997-11-21	Club Colon, Santiago del Estero, Argentina	
35	Loss	29–4–2	Chatchai Singwangcha	RTD	7 (12)	1997-08-01	Prince Palace Hotel, Bangkok, Thailand	For interim WBC flyweight title
34	Win	29–3–2	Cipriano Landa	KO	4 (12)	1997-05-17	Santiago del Estero, Argentina	
33	Win	28–3–2	Julio Jerez	PTS	10 (10)	1997-04-19	Estudios Canal 9 TV, Buenos Aires, Argentina	
32	Win	27–3–2	Luis Alberto Ortiz	PTS	12 (12)	1997-02-14	Mar del Plata, Argentina	Retained IBF Inter-Continental flyweight title
31	Draw	26–3–2	Adrian Cristian Ochoa	PTS	12 (12)	1996-10-18	Santiago del Estero, Argentina	
30	Win	26–3–1	Dunoy Pena	KO	1 (12)	1996-07-25	Santiago del Estero, Argentina	Won vacant IBF Inter-Continental flyweight title
29	Win	25–3–1	Ignacio Aguilar	PTS	12 (12)	1996-04-19	Santiago del Estero, Argentina	
28	Win	24–3–1	Luis Blanco	TKO	9 (12)	1996-02-16	Santiago del Estero, Argentina	Retained South American light-flyweight title
27	Win	23–3–1	Adrian Cristian Ochoa	PTS	10 (10)	1995-12-15	Santiago del Estero, Argentina	
26	Loss	22–3–1	Mzukisi Sikali	SD	12 (12)	1995-09-03	Centenary Hall, New Brighton, South Africa	Lost WBC International light-flyweight title
25	Win	22–2–1	Oscar Vergara	PTS	12 (12)	1995-07-29	Estadio F.A.B., Buenos Aires, Argentina	Retained South American light-flyweight title
24	Win	21–2–1	Ramon Mercedes Gonzalez	TKO	4 (?)	1995-05-24	Santiago del Estero, Argentina	
23	Win	20–2–1	Miguel Angel Noez	KO	7 (?)	1995-03-18	Buenos Aires, Argentina	
22	Win	19–2–1	Pedro Javier Torres	PTS	10 (10)	1995-02-17	Santiago del Estero, Argentina	
21	Win	18–2–1	Oscar Vergara	TKO	4 (12)	1995-01-13	Santiago del Estero, Argentina	Retained South American light-flyweight title
20	Loss	17–2–1	Humberto González	RTD	7 (12)	1994-09-10	Caesars Tahoe, Stateline, Nevada, U.S.	For WBC & IBF light-flyweight titles
19	Win	17–1–1	Ruben Asencio Molina	PTS	12 (12)	1994-08-05	La Banda, Argentina	Won vacant Argentine light-flyweight title
18	Win	16–1–1	Marcelo De Freitas	TKO	2 (10)	1994-05-26	Club Nolting, Ciudadela, Argentina	
17	Win	15–1–1	Jose Luis Diaz	PTS	10 (10)	1994-04-22	La Banda, Argentina	
16	Win	14–1–1	Pablo Tiznado	UD	12 (12)	1994-03-26	La Banda, Argentina	Won vacant WBC International light-flyweight title
15	Win	13–1–1	Alli Galvez	KO	2 (12)	1994-02-11	Santiago del Estero, Argentina	Won South American light-flyweight title
14	Win	12–1–1	Erich Ramon Sanabria	TKO	4 (10)	1994-01-22	Mar del Plata, Argentina	
13	Win	11–1–1	Ruben Asencio Molina	PTS	8 (8)	1993-11-27	Estadio F.A.B., Buenos Aires, Argentina	
12	Win	10–1–1	Jose Hamilton Rodrigues	PTS	10 (10)	1993-11-12	Santiago del Estero, Argentina	
11	Win	9–1–1	Sandro Orlando Oviedo	RTD	2 (8)	1993-10-30	Estadio F.A.B., Buenos Aires, Argentina	
10	Draw	8–1–1	Mozart Gomes dos Santos	PTS	10 (10)	1993-10-15	Santiago del Estero, Argentina	
9	Win	8–1	Redigildo Conceicao	KO	2 (8)	1993-10-01	Santiago del Estero, Argentina	
8	Win	7–1	Mario Crispin Romero	TKO	3 (10)	1993-09-10	Santiago del Estero, Argentina	
7	Win	6–1	Agustin Jose Lopez	PTS	10 (10)	1993-08-13	Santiago del Estero, Argentina	
6	Win	5–1	Sergio Alejandro Gomez	KO	1 (10)	1993-07-23	Santiago del Estero, Argentina	
5	Win	4–1	Juan Ruben Dionisio Castro	KO	2 (6)	1993-03-26	Santiago del Estero, Argentina	
4	Win	3–1	Mario Rodolfo Garnica	TKO	4 (6)	1993-02-19	Santiago del Estero, Argentina	
3	Win	2–1	Jose Luis Galan	KO	1 (6)	1993-02-05	Santiago del Estero, Argentina	
2	Loss	1–1	Pastor Humberto Maurin	KO	1 (10)	1992-11-20	General Güemes, Argentina	
1	Win	1–0	Luis Osvaldo Monges	TKO	4 (6)	1992-11-13	Catamarca, Argentina	

== See also ==
- List of world light-flyweight boxing champions

Sporting positions
Regional boxing titles
Preceded by Alli Galvez	South American light-flyweight champion February 11, 1994 – April 1996; Vacated	Vacant Title next held by Luis Alberto Lazarte
Vacant Title last held by Pablo Tiznado	WBC International light-flyweight champion March 26, 1994 – September 3, 1995	Succeeded by Mzukisi Sikali
Vacant Title last held by Héctor Patri	Argentine light-flyweight champion August 5, 1994 – 1997; Vacated	Vacant Title next held by Luis Alberto Lazarte
Vacant Title last held by Vuyani Nene	IBF Inter-Continental flyweight champion July 25, 1996 – 1997; Vacated	Vacant Title next held by Ferid Ben Jeddou
World boxing titles
Preceded by Melchor Cob Castro	WBO light-flyweight champion January 17, 1998 – December 5, 1998	Succeeded by Jorge Arce
