= Hussein Hussein =

Australian boxer

Personal information
- Nickname: Hussy
- Nationality: Australian
- Born: 29 September 1975 (age 50) Sydney, Australia
- Height: 5 ft 6 in (168 cm)
- Weight: Flyweight

Boxing career
- Stance: Orthodox

Boxing record
- Total fights: 36
- Wins: 31
- Win by KO: 24
- Losses: 5

Hussein ("Hussy") Hussein (born 29 September 1975) is an Australian former professional boxer who competed from 1998 to 2008. He challenged for the WBC flyweight title in 2003 and the interim WBC flyweight title in 2005. As an amateur, he represented his country at the 1994 Commonwealth Games in Victoria, British Columbia, Canada and at the 1996 Summer Olympics in Atlanta, Georgia, where he was beaten in the second round of the men's flyweight division (– 51 kg) by Ireland's Damaen Kelly.

Hussein Hussein was inducted into the Australian National Boxing Hall of Fame Moderns category in 2022.

He was an Australian Institute of Sport scholarship holder. His amateur record was 84–17.

He turned professional with Jeff Fenech in 1998 and was ranked no. 1 in the world in the flyweight division. Fought for the WBC world flyweight title against Pongsaklek Wonjongkam in Bangkok Thailand in 2003. Lost on points. He also fought against 3 division world champion Jorge Arce in 2005 and lost in the 10th round, was a candidate for ESPN fight of the year.

After retirement Hussein Hussein is a boxing trainer along with his brothers Billy Hussein and Maz Hussein at the Bodypunch Boxing Gym in Lakemba Sydney Australia.

== Professional boxing record ==
36 fights	31 wins	5 losses
By knockout	24	2
By decision	7	3

No.	Result	Record	Opponent	Type	Round, time	Date	Location	Notes
36	Loss	31–5	Moruti Mthalane	UD	12	5 Jul 2008	Jan Smuts Stadium, East London, South Africa	
35	Loss	31–4	Hiroyuki Kodaka	UD	10	24 Dec 2007	Azalea Taisho, Osaka, Japan	
34	Win	31–3	Anis Ceunfin	KO	3 (8), 2:28	10 Aug 2007	Club Marconi, Sydney, Australia	
33	Win	30–3	Noldi Manakane	KO	2 (10), 2:08	22 Sep 2006	La Luna Lounge, Sydney, Australia	
32	Win	29–3	Kompayak Porpramook	RTD	4 (10), 3:00	5 May 2006	Bellevue Function Centre, Sydney, Australia	
31	Loss	28–3	Jorge Arce	TKO	2 (12), 2:50	8 Oct 2005	Thomas & Mack Center, Paradise, Nevada, U.S.	For WBC interim flyweight title
30	Win	28–2	Evaristo Primera	UD	10	11 Jun 2005	MCI Center, Washington, D.C., U.S.	
29	Loss	27–2	Jorge Arce	TKO	10 (12), 2:07	19 Mar 2005	MGM Grand Garden Arena, Paradise, Nevada, U.S.	
28	Win	27–1	Federico Catubay	TKO	3 (12), 2:50	6 Feb 2005	Panthers World of Entertainment, Penrith, Australia	Won OPBF flyweight title
27	Win	26–1	Yoppie Benu	KO	5 (10), 0:44	10 Dec 2004	Southport Sharks AFL Club, Gold Coast, Australia	
26	Win	25–1	Dozer Tobing	TKO	5 (8), 1:29	16 Apr 2004	Panthers World of Entertainment, Penrith, Australia	
25	Win	24–1	Pedek Shandra	TKO	2 (10)	21 Mar 2004	Challenge Stadium, Perth, Australia	
24	Loss	23–1	Pongsaklek Wonjongkam	UD	12	14 Nov 2003	Lumpinee Boxing Stadium, Bangkok, Thailand	For WBC flyweight title
23	Win	23–0	Falazona Fidal	UD	8	3 Oct 2003	Badgery's Pavilion, Sydney, Australia	
22	Win	22–0	Wandee Singwangcha	UD	10	21 Feb 2003	Metro City Northbridge, Perth, Australia	
21	Win	21–0	Panca Silaban	TKO	4 (8), 1:01	25 Oct 2002	Star City Casino, Sydney, Australia	
20	Win	20–0	Kosol Sor Vorapin	KO	5 (8)	2 Aug 2002	Le Montage Function Centre, Sydney, Australia	
19	Win	19–0	Sande Kizito	UD	8	10 May 2002	Central Coast Rugby League Club, Central Coast, Australia	
18	Win	18–0	Kakhar Sabitov	TKO	4 (8), 1:31	9 Feb 2002	M.E.N. Arena, Manchester, England	
17	Win	17–0	Rung Makate	KO	1 (8)	28 Sep 2001	The Octagon, Sydney, Australia	
16	Win	16–0	Selvio Glinoco	TKO	2 (10)	3 Aug 2001	Bellevue Function Centre, Sydney, Australia	
15	Win	15–0	Sandro Orlando Oviedo	UD	6	5 May 2001	Silver Star Casino, Philadelphia, Pennsylvania, U.S.	
14	Win	14–0	Steve Quinn	RTD	2 (4), 3:00	27 Jan 2001	York Hall, London, England	
13	Win	13–0	Sean Green	TKO	1 (6)	7 Oct 2000	Doncaster Dome, Doncaster, England	
12	Win	12–0	Prasob Nookliang	KO	2 (10)	11 Aug 2000	Enmore Theatre, Sydney, Australia	
11	Win	11–0	David Coldwell	TKO	1 (6)	24 Jun 2000	Hampden Park, Glasgow, Scotland	
10	Win	10–0	Daojarasnoy Pitak	KO	3 (10), 1:47	26 May 2000	Ettalong War Memorial Club, Central Coast, Australia	
9	Win	9–0	Pornchai Sithpraprom	TKO	1 (8)	24 Mar 2000	Hornsby RSL Club, Sydney, Australia	
8	Win	8–0	Dianever Orcales	PTS	8	30 Oct 1999	Croydon Leisure Centre, Melbourne, Australia	
7	Win	7–0	Pornchai Sithpraprom	PTS	10	7 Jun 1999	Star City Casino, Sydney, Australia	
6	Win	6–0	Charoenpetch Payakyothin	KO	1 (10)	12 Apr 1999	Star City Casino, Sydney, Australia	
5	Win	5–0	Kid Hamzah	KO	1 (8)	9 Nov 1998	Star City Casino, Sydney, Australia	
4	Win	4–0	Maximo Barro	KO	8 (10)	25 Sep 1998	Newtown RSL Club, Sydney, Australia	
3	Win	3–0	Johnny Binge	TKO	3 (6), 2:46	26 Jun 1999	Bankstown Sports Club, Sydney, Australia	
2	Win	2–0	Pratap Sen	KO	1 (6), 1:06	24 Apr 1998	Bankstown Sports Club, Sydney, Australia	
1	Win	1–0	Barry Olsen	TKO	2 (6), 2:45	20 Feb 1998	Bankstown Sports Club, Sydney, Australia	
