= Pone Kingpetch =

Thai boxer

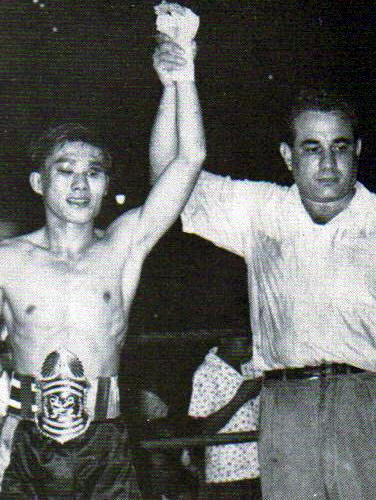
- Pone Kingpetch on April 16, 1960, after capturing the world title

Personal information
- Born: Mana Sridokbuab; February 12, 1935 Hua Hin, Thailand
- Died: May 31, 1982 (aged 47) Bangkok, Thailand
- Height: 5 ft 6 1/2 in (169 cm)
- Weight: Flyweight

Boxing career
- Stance: Orthodox

Boxing record
- Total fights: 35
- Wins: 28
- Win by KO: 9
- Losses: 7

Pone Kingpetch (Thai: โผน กิ่งเพชร, RTGS: Phon Kingphet, pronounced [pʰǒːn kìŋ.pʰét]), born Mana Seedokbuab (Thai: มานะ สีดอกบวบ, RTGS: Mana Sidokbuap, pronounced [māː.náʔ sǐː.dɔ̀ːk.bùa̯p]; February 12, 1935 – May 31, 1982), was a Thai professional boxer and three time Undisputed World Flyweight Champion.

== Early life ==
Pone Kingpetch (born Mana Sidokbuap) was the seventh of nine children born to Hoi and Riew Sidokbuap in the Hua Hin district. He attended Sathukarn Secondary School until the fourth grade before transferring to the Hua Hin District School, where he completed his ninth-grade studies. Kingpetch completed his secondary school education at Hua Hin Wittayalai School.

Kingpetch was extensively involved in many sports. But his favorite sport was always boxing, going on to tell his friends he would become the first boxing world champion from Thailand. At the time, Chamroen Songkitrat had unsuccessfully challenged for the world bantamweight championship three times from 1954 to 1955.

== Boxing career ==
=== Early career ===
Pone Kingpetch turned to professional boxing and won the Thai flyweight title with a TKO victory over Kunoi Vithichai in April 1956. He defended the Thai title against Vithichai on October of that same year.

In January 1957, Pone Kingpetch defeated Danny Kid in Bangkok to win the OPBF flyweight title. He made one title defense of the OPBF belt against Hitoshi Misako in September 1957.

His ring name, 'Phon,' was given to him by his manager Thongthot Intharathat, the owner of the Kingpetch boxing gym. (Note: Located in Soi Kingpetch, or Soi Phetchaburi 10.) It was taken from the name of Major Phon Intharathat, Thongthot's younger brother, who had been a Free Thai member and was killed in the Palace Rebellion.

=== World flyweight champion ===
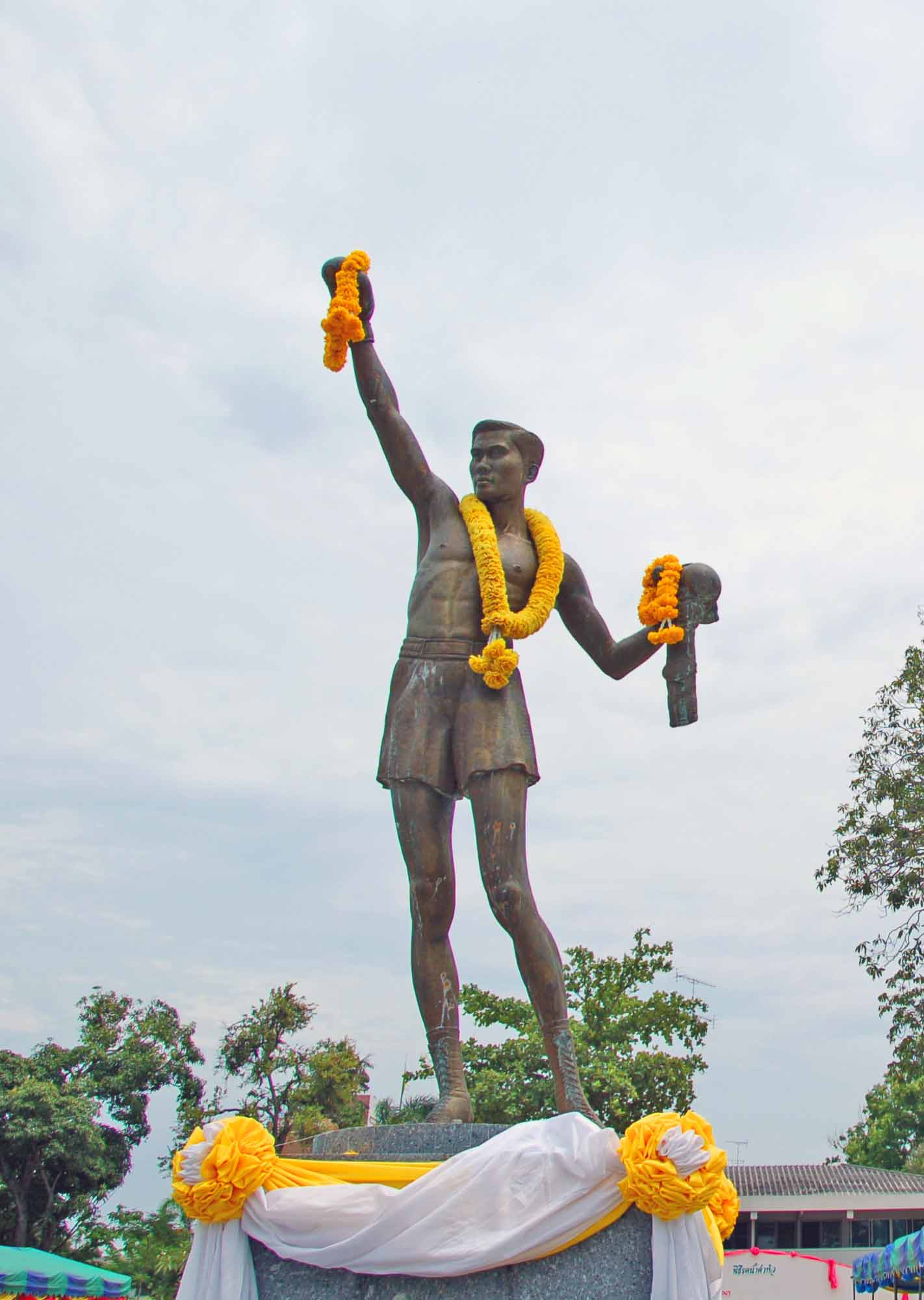
Statue of Pone Kingpetch at Pone Kingpetch park in Hua Hin

He became Thailand's first world boxing champion on April 16, 1960, when he defeated Pascual Pérez of Argentina at Lumphini Boxing Stadium in Bangkok for the world flyweight championship.

In his fourth title defense, he lost the title to Fighting Harada of Japan via 11th-round knockout on October 10, 1962. Pone Kingpetch regained the world championship after outpointing Harada in a rematch on January 12, 1963. However, his second reign proved to be short, as Hiroyuki Ebihara knocked Pone out in the first round to become the new world flyweight champion.

On February 14, 1963, with the creation of the World Boxing Council, Kingpetch was named the inaugural WBC flyweight champion. Several other champions had been named in some divisions while in others, the reigning champions fought for the inaugural title. In his final title win he defeated Ebihara in a rematch on January 23, 1964, to become a three-time world flyweight champion. After the win in Japan, he travelled to Italy to defend his title against Salvatore Burruni and lost a 15-round decision to the Italian in his final world title fight. He retired from the sport altogether in 1966 at the age of 31.

== Later life and death ==
After retiring, the money he earned from his boxing career was invested into other businesses. However, the Manawitthaya School, which was built in his hometown during his career, had to be sold. His attempts at running other businesses resulted in financial losses, as Kingpetch proved inadept in the many aspects of business and trade.

Kingpetch was also afflicted with a chronic illness: diabetes. While having a family meal at home, he choked on his food, which got stuck in his windpipe. This resulted in rotting and blood poisoning, leading to Kingpetch's health deteriorating significantly as he was already suffering from both a cold and pneumonia. He was admitted to Ramathibodi Hospital, although his condition did not improve. Kingpetch died on May 31, 1982, from pneumonia and heart failure, He was 47.

Pone Kingpetch was inducted into the International Boxing Hall of Fame (IBHOF) in 2023.

== Professional boxing record ==
| 35 fights | 28 wins | 7 losses |
|---|---|---|
| By knockout | 9 | 3 |
| By decision | 19 | 4 |

| No. | Result | Record | Opponent | Type | Round | Date | Location | Notes |
|---|---|---|---|---|---|---|---|---|
| 35 | Win | 28–7 | Kumanthong Yontarakit | KO | 4 (10) | Apr 13, 1966 | Phuket Province, Thailand | |
| 34 | Loss | 27–7 | Baby Lorona | SD | 10 | Feb 17, 1966 | Bangkok, Thailand | |
| 33 | Loss | 27–6 | Salvatore Burruni | UD | 15 | Apr 23, 1965 | Palazzetto dello Sport, Rome, Lazio, Italy | Lost WBA, WBC, and The Ring flyweight titles |
| 32 | Win | 27–5 | Hiroyuki Ebihara | SD | 15 | Jan 23, 1964 | Rajadamnern Boxing Stadium, Bangkok, Thailand | Won WBA, WBC, and The Ring flyweight titles |
| 31 | Loss | 26–5 | Hiroyuki Ebihara | KO | 1 (15) | Sep 18, 1963 | Metropolitan Gym, Tokyo, Japan | Lost WBA, WBC, and The Ring flyweight titles |
| 30 | Win | 26–4 | Fighting Harada | MD | 15 | Jan 12, 1963 | National Stadium Gymnasium, Bangkok, Thailand | Won WBA and The Ring flyweight titles |
| 29 | Loss | 25–4 | Fighting Harada | KO | 11 (15) | Oct 10, 1962 | Kokugikan, Japan | Lost WBA and The Ring flyweight titles |
| 28 | Win | 25–3 | Kyō Noguchi | UD | 15 | May 30, 1962 | Kokugikan, Japan | Retained NBA and The Ring flyweight titles |
| 27 | Win | 24–3 | Baby Demilonnez | TKO | 8 (10) | Feb 19, 1962 | Rajadamnern Boxing Stadium, Bangkok, Thailand | |
| 26 | Win | 23–3 | Mitsunori Seki | SD | 15 | Jun 27, 1961 | Kokugikan, Japan | Retained NBA and The Ring flyweight titles |
| 25 | Win | 22–3 | Jose Luis Martinez | PTS | 10 | Mar 2, 1961 | Bangkok, Thailand | |
| 24 | Win | 21–3 | Pascual Pérez | TKO | 8 (15) | Sep 22, 1960 | Grand Olympic Auditorium, Los Angeles, California, U.S. | Retained NBA and The Ring flyweight titles |
| 23 | Win | 20–3 | Pascual Pérez | SD | 15 | Apr 16, 1960 | Lumpinee Boxing Stadium, Bangkok, Thailand | Won NBA and The Ring flyweight titles |
| 22 | Win | 19–3 | Baby Ross | KO | 4 (10) | Jan 31, 1960 | Bangkok, Thailand | |
| 21 | Win | 18–3 | Manuel Armenteros | PTS | 10 | Feb 17, 1959 | Bangkok, Thailand | |
| 20 | Win | 17–3 | Dangtoy Singmorakot | PTS | 8 | Nov 4, 1958 | Bangkok, Thailand | |
| 19 | Win | 16–3 | Somyod Singmorakot | KO | 5 (10) | Jun 28, 1958 | Bangkok, Thailand | |
| 18 | Win | 15–3 | Masaji Iwamoto | PTS | 10 | Mar 14, 1958 | Bangkok, Thailand | |
| 17 | Win | 14–3 | Dommy Ursua | TD | 5 (10) | Jan 11, 1958 | Bangkok, Thailand | |
| 16 | Win | 13–3 | Hitoshi Misako | PTS | 12 | Sep 14, 1957 | Bangkok, Thailand | |
| 15 | Loss | 12–3 | Leo Espinosa | PTS | 12 | Jul 7, 1957 | Bangkok, Thailand | |
| 14 | Win | 12–2 | Danny Kid | PTS | 12 | Jan 6, 1957 | Bangkok, Thailand | |
| 13 | Win | 11–2 | Kunoi Vithichai | PTS | 10 | Oct 14, 1956 | Rajadamnern Boxing Stadium, Bangkok, Thailand | |
| 12 | Win | 10–2 | Mintan Kampuch | KO | 4 (6) | Jul 22, 1956 | Bangkok, Thailand | |
| 11 | Win | 9–2 | Kunoi Vithichai | KO | 6 (6) | Jul 14, 1956 | Lumpinee Boxing Stadium, Bangkok, Thailand | |
| 10 | Win | 8–2 | Porn Pantukiat | KO | 3 (6) | Jun 28, 1956 | Bangkok, Thailand | |
| 9 | Win | 7–2 | Prayuth Yontarakit | PTS | 6 | Jun 3, 1956 | Bangkok, Thailand | |
| 8 | Loss | 6–2 | Kunoi Vithichai | TKO | 7 (10) | Apr 15, 1956 | Rajadamnern Boxing Stadium, Bangkok, Thailand | |
| 7 | Win | 6–1 | Boontam Viteechai | PTS | 6 | Feb 5, 1956 | Bangkok, Thailand | |
| 6 | Win | 5–1 | Opas Rorsorpor | PTS | 6 | Sep 29, 1955 | Bangkok, Thailand | |
| 5 | Win | 4–1 | Dejnoi Sorsor | PTS | 6 | Aug 11, 1955 | Bangkok, Thailand | |
| 4 | Win | 3–1 | Yutapon Raksu | PTS | 6 | Mar 27, 1955 | Bangkok, Thailand | |
| 3 | Loss | 2–1 | Suwan Napapon | PTS | 6 | Feb 1, 1955 | Bangkok, Thailand | |
| 2 | Win | 2–0 | Saotong Torsor | PTS | 6 | Jul 1, 1954 | Hua Hin, Thailand | |
| 1 | Win | 1–0 | Noknid Sorsor | KO | 2 (6) | May 1, 1954 | Hua Hin, Thailand | |

== Titles in boxing ==
=== Major world titles ===
- NBA (WBA) flyweight champion (112 lbs) (3×) (Note: The NBA was renamed the WBA at the end of his first reign.)
- WBC flyweight champion (Note: Inaugural champion.) (112 lbs) (2×)

=== The Ring magazine titles ===
- The Ring flyweight champion (112 lbs) (3×)

=== Undisputed titles ===
- Undisputed flyweight champion (3×) (Note: The NYSAC stopped awarding their flyweight title during his first reign, as such, Pone was recognized as the undisputed flyweight world champion three separate times.)

== See also ==
- List of flyweight boxing champions

== Notes and references ==
=== References ===
Achievements
| Preceded by Pascual Perez | Lineal flyweight champion April 16, 1960 - October 10, 1962 | Succeeded by Fighting Harada |
| Preceded by Pascual Perez | The Ring flyweight champion April 16, 1960 - October 10, 1962 | Succeeded by Fighting Harada |
| Preceded by Fighting Harada | WBA flyweight Champion; January 12, 1963 - September 18, 1963 | Succeeded by Hiroyuki Ebihara |
| Preceded by Fighting Harada | Lineal flyweight Champion; January 12, 1963 - September 18, 1963 | Succeeded by Hiroyuki Ebihara |
| Preceded by Fighting Harada | The Ring flyweight champion January 12, 1963 - September 18, 1963 | Succeeded by Hiroyuki Ebihara |
| Preceded by Hiroyuki Ebihara | WBA flyweight Champion; January 23, 1964 - April 23, 1965 | Succeeded by Salvatore Burruni |
| Preceded by Hiroyuki Ebihara | WBC flyweight Champion; January 23, 1964 - April 23, 1965 | Succeeded by Salvatore Burruni |
| Preceded by Hiroyuki Ebihara | Lineal flyweight Champion; January 23, 1964 - April 23, 1965 | Succeeded by Salvatore Burruni |
| Preceded by Hiroyuki Ebihara | The Ring flyweight champion January 23, 1964 - April 23, 1965 | Succeeded by Salvatore Burruni |
| Preceded by Hiroyuki Ebihara | Undisputed flyweight champion January 23, 1964 - April 23, 1965 | Succeeded by Salvatore Burruni |
