= Melchor Cob Castro =

Mexican boxer (born 1968)

Personal information
- Born: Melchor Cob Castro; April 18, 1968 (age 58) Campeche, Mexico
- Height: 5 ft 0 in (153 cm)
- Weight: Light flyweight

Boxing career
- Stance: Southpaw

Boxing record
- Total fights: 87
- Wins: 71
- Win by KO: 34
- Losses: 12
- Draws: 4

Melchor Cob Castro (born 18 April 1968 in Chiná, Campeche, Mexico) is a Mexican former professional boxer in the light flyweight (108 lb) division.

== Pro career ==
Cob Castro turned pro in 1986 and captured the WBC light flyweight title in 1991 with a TKO win over Rolando Pascua. He lost the belt in his first defense to Humberto González later that year by decision. In 1992 he lost a rematch to Gonzalez, also by decision. In 1997 he captured the WBO light flyweight title with a decision win over Jesus Chong, but again lost the belt in his first defense to Juan Domingo Córdoba.

In 2004 he took on Jorge Arce for the WBC light flyweight title, and was knocked out for the first time in his career in the 5th round.

== See also ==
- List of Mexican boxing world champions
- List of light-flyweight boxing champions

Achievements
Preceded by Rolando Pascua	WBC light flyweight champion March 25, 1991 – June 3, 1991	Succeeded by Humberto González
Preceded by Jesús Chong	WBO light flyweight champion August 25, 1997 – January 17, 1998	Succeeded by Juan Domingo Córdoba
