= Jorge Arce =

Mexican boxer (born 1979)

Personal information
- Nickname: El Travieso ("Mischievous Boy")
- Born: Jorge Armando Arce Armenta; July 27, 1979 (age 47) Los Mochis, Sinaloa, Mexico
- Height: 5 ft 4 1/2 in (164 cm)
- Weight: Light flyweight; Flyweight; Super flyweight; Bantamweight; Super bantamweight; Featherweight

Boxing career
- Reach: 66 in (168 cm)
- Stance: Orthodox

Boxing record
- Total fights: 75
- Wins: 64
- Win by KO: 49
- Losses: 8
- Draws: 2
- No contests: 1

Jorge Armando Arce Armenta (/ˈɑːrseɪ/; born July 27, 1979), best known as Jorge Arce, is a Mexican former professional boxer who competed from 1996 to 2014. He is a multiple-time world champion, and the second boxer from Mexico to win world titles in four weight divisions (after Érik Morales, who first achieved the feat two months prior). In a storied career, Arce held the WBO light flyweight title from 1998 to 1999; the WBC and lineal light flyweight titles from 2002 to 2004; the WBO super flyweight title in 2010; the WBO junior featherweight title in 2011; and the WBO bantamweight title from 2011 to 2012. Additionally he held the WBC interim flyweight title from 2005 to 2006, the WBA interim super flyweight title from 2008 to 2009, and challenged once for the WBC featherweight title in his final fight in 2014.

Arce remains a favorite fighter among boxing fans and is also the older brother of title contender Francisco Arce Armenta. Arce's trademark ring entrance featured him wearing a black cowboy hat (earning him the nickname "The Mexican Cowboy") and sucking a cherry lollipop.

== Professional career ==
=== Early years at light flyweight ===
Arce turned pro at the age of 16, winning his first four fights. He lost to future champion Omar Romero and drew with Gabriel Munoz in back-to-back fights in the summer of 1996, but then won 10 straight bouts and a pair of regional belts before losing on points to veteran (and future IBF Light Flyweight Champion) Jose Victor Burgos on December 12, 1997.

He recovered from that setback with four straight wins, earning his first world title shot on December 5, 1998, against Juan Domingo Córdoba for the WBO Light Flyweight title. Arce won the fight and became a world champion at the age of 19.

After making one successful defense of his title, Arce drew a big-money fight in Tijuana against three-time former champion Michael Carbajal on July 31, 1999. Arce was ahead on all three judges' scorecards after 10 rounds, but in the 11th, the veteran Carbajal connected with a stunning right hand and captured the crown via a technical knockout, as Arce was unable to continue.

After a four-month layoff, Arce returned to the ring and won a WBO regional belt as he scored 7 consecutive wins while working his way back up the rankings for another title shot. That came on October 20, 2001, when he defeated Juanito Rubillar for the Interim WBC version of the Light Flyweight title. Nine months later, he beat Yo-Sam Choi, the reigning Lineal and WBC light flyweight champion who had been out with an injury, to take full distinction. He held the title until the summer of 2005 before relinquishing it to move up in weight. In his first defense, he defeated Augustin Lara. In 2003, he successfully defended his title three times against Ernesto Castro, Lee Marvin Sandoval, and Melchor Cob Castro.

Towards the end of 2003, he participated in the Televisa version of Big Brother, the Big Brother V.I.P. show that put celebrities together. He arrived in third place, then went training for his next defense, against former world champion Joma Gamboa on January 10 of the following year. Arce invited his Big Brother celebrity friends to the fight with Gamboa, his first fight of 2004, which he won by a second-round knockout. But during and after the fight, chaos ensued. One of his friends, actress Arleth Gonzalez, was kicked off her chair by another person. And Verónica Castro was pursued by the press when she was trying to leave the fight site, taking her more than two hours to get to the site's parking lot.

On April 24, 2004, Arce successfully defended his title in a rematch against former champ Melchor Cob Castro in Tuxtla Gutiérrez, Chiapas. Arce had beaten Castro in May 2003, but the fight was called off after six rounds due to a clash of heads which injured Arce. The fight went to the scorecards and Arce won a narrow, but controversial, decision. He left no doubt in the rematch, knocking Castro out in the fifth round.

On September 4 of that same year, he retained the title with a twelve-round decision in a rematch with Rubillar. The fight caused some controversy afterwards, when Rubillar's manager accused the fight's judges of robbing his fighter, going on to offer Arce 100,000 US$ for a rematch, which would be held in the Philippines.

Arce moved on to defend his title for a seventh time on December 18, defeating Juan Centeno by a third-round TKO. He then decided to try his luck in the flyweight (112-pound) weight division.

=== Flyweight ===
On March 19, 2005, Arce stopped Hussein Hussein in the 10th round of a fight for the right to challenge Pongsaklek Wonjongkam for his WBC Flyweight title. He later relinquished his light flyweight crown and was matched by the WBC with Angel Priolo on July 30 for their interim title after Wonjongkam suffered an injury. Arce scored a third-round TKO win in the fight, held in La Paz, Mexico.

While waiting to fight Wongjongkam, Arce stayed busy by rematching Hussein on October 8 in Las Vegas. He retained his Interim WBC title with a second-round knockout.

On December 16, 2005, Arce defeated former two-time champion Adonis Rivas by 10th round tko. In his next bout, Arce defeated Rivas in a rematch.

On April 8, 2006, Arce took on the well regarded, former WBA Minimumweight and Light Flyweight Champion Rosendo Alvarez of Nicaragua, knocking Alvarez out in the sixth round. It was the 4th successful defense of his Interim Flyweight title.

=== Super flyweight ===
On September 23, 2006, he moved up to the super flyweight division where he defeated former Light Flyweight Champion Masibulele "Hawk" Makepula by fourth-round knockout (which, according to the HBO commentators, he had predicted earlier). On January 27, 2007, he defeated Argentinian Julio Ler in a 12-round decision, thus earning the WBC #1 super-flyweight ranking.

On April 14, 2007, he lost a 12-round unanimous decision to WBC Super Flyweight Champion Cristian Mijares in San Antonio, Texas. Mijares won the fight by a wide margin, with the official judges scoring the match 119–109, 118–110, 117–111, all in favor of Mijares.

Arce rebounded from the loss by defeating future champion Tomás Rojas by 6th-round technical knockout. On December 1, 2007, Arce defeated former Flyweight Champion Medgoen Singsurat by technical knockout in the first round.

On May 17, 2008, in a very close fight, Arce (49–4–1, 37 KOs) edged Devid Lookmahanak of Thailand (18–2, 9 KOs) with a majority decision in the main event at the Plaza Monumental Aguascalientes in Aguascalientes, Mexico. With a sold-out crowd of 18,000 fans cheering him on, Arce had to dig deep and work hard to pull past the once-beaten Lookmahanak, who turned out to be a very game southpaw and rarely took a step back. The difference in the fight, which also gave Arce the win, was a knockdown in the seventh round. The scores were 115–113, 115–114 and 114–114. Without the extra point for the knockdown, the fight would have been scored a draw. The bout was an eliminator for a shot at the WBC Super Flyweight title. Arce moves on to a rematch with Cristian Mijares, who earlier captured the WBA's version of the title with a points win over Alexander Muñoz.

On September 15, 2008, Arce won the Interim WBA Super Flyweight title from holder Rafael Concepción.

Arce blasted former champion Isidro García, on November 1, 2008, via (48 seconds of the) 4th round technical knockout for a super flyweight belt. He improved to 51–4–1, with 38 wins inside the distance, while Garcia, who has lost 3 of his last 4 fights, was down to 25–6–2.

On February 7, 2009, Arce was defeated by Unified Super Flyweight Champion Vic Darchinyan.

Arce fought Simphiwe Nongqayi on September 15, 2009, for the IBF Super Flyweight title which was recently vacated by Darchinyan. However, he ended losing by unanimous decision.

Arce defeated Indonesian Angky Angkota on January 30, 2010, winning the vacant WBO Super Flyweight title. Prior to the bout, Arce stated that he would retire from boxing if he would have lost.

=== Bantamweight ===
On April 24, 2010, Arce jumped to the bantamweight division to fight fellow Mexican Cecilio Santos (24–13–3; 14 KO) at the Centro de Usos Multiples in Ciudad Obregón, Sonora, Mexico. Arce defeated his opponent by KO in the 7th round, improving his record to 54–6–1. This was not his first fight as a bantamweight: he already fought once in the weight class in 2007.

Arce was scheduled to fight Eric Morel (42–2; 21 KO) of Puerto Rico on June 26, 2010 at the Alamodome in San Antonio, Texas, United States, with the Interim WBO Bantamweight title at stake. The Los Mochis native withdrew from the fight a few weeks in advance due to a cut he received while in training.

In his next fight, on July 31, 2010, Arce took on fellow Mexican and former champion Martín "El Gallo" Castillo at the Palenque de la Feria in Tepic, Nayarit, Mexico. The Los Mochis native won the bout by KO in the first round.

=== Super bantamweight ===
On May 7, 2011, as a heavy underdog, he beat a then undefeated WBO Super Bantamweight Champion, Wilfredo Vazquez, Jr. of Puerto Rico by twelfth-round technical knockout. He avenged his prior loss to former champion Simphiwe Nongqayi in defense of his title.

=== Bantamweight ===
Arce moved down to the bantamweight division to face Angky Angkotta in a rematch for the vacant WBO bantamweight title. He defeated Angkotta by unanimous decision.

=== Return to super bantamweight ===
On February 18, 2012, he defeated former champion Lorenzo Parra. In his next fight, he faced future featherweight title holder Jesus Rojas. Arce dropped Rojas in the opening round, however, the fight ended in a no-contest in the 2nd round after Rojas delivered a series of fowls rendering Arce unable to continue.

He then moved up to the featherweight division and defeated former champion Mauricio Martínez.

On December 15, 2012, Arce fought WBO Super Bantamweight champion Nonito Donaire. He suffered a defeat on the third round via knockout. After losing to Donaire, Arce announced his retirement.

=== Featherweight ===
Arce announced his return to the ring a year later in the featherweight division. After scoring three consecutive wins, he challenged WBC World Featherweight champion Jhonny González, however, he was defeated by 11th round TKO. He retired after the bout.

== Life outside of boxing ==
Arce has gained some popularity outside the ring as well, acting in various Televisa comedy sketches, and participating in Adal Ramones's show's dancing contest, Bailando por un Sueño, where he and a fellow contestant arrived in eighth place out of nine couples. He has also done boxing commentary for TV Azteca.

== Professional boxing record ==
75 fights	64 wins	8 losses
By knockout	49	5
By decision	15	3
Draws	2	
No contests	1	

No.	Result	Record	Opponent	Type	Round, time	Date	Location	Notes
75	Loss	64–8–2 (1)	Jhonny González	TKO	11 (12), 2:43	Oct 4, 2014	Gimnasio Polifuncional, Los Mochis, Mexico	For WBC featherweight title
74	Win	64–7–2 (1)	Jorge Lacierva	TKO	8 (10)	Jun 14, 2014	Arena Metropolitana Jorge Cuesy Serrano, Tuxtla Gutiérrez, Mexico	
73	Win	63–7–2 (1)	Aldimar Silva	TKO	5 (10), 0:41	Mar 8, 2014	Domo de la Macroplaza, Nogales, Mexico	
72	Win	62–7–2 (1)	Jose Carmona	KO	8 (10)	Nov 16, 2013	El Domo, San Luis Potosí City, Mexico	
71	Loss	61–7–2 (1)	Nonito Donaire	TKO	3 (12), 2:59	Dec 15, 2012	Toyota Center, Houston, Texas, U.S.	For WBO and The Ring junior featherweight titles
70	Win	61–6–2 (1)	Mauricio Martinez	UD	10	Sep 22, 2012	Gimnasio Polifuncional, Los Mochis, Mexico	
69	NC	60–6–2 (1)	Jesus Rojas	NC	2 (10) 0:09	Jun 9, 2012	MGM Grand Garden Arena, Paradise, Nevada, U.S.	NC after Arce could not continue from an accidental foul
68	Win	60–6–2	Lorenzo Parra	KO	5 (10) 1:50	Feb 18, 2012	Feria Nacional, Durango City, Mexico	
67	Win	59–6–2	Angky Angkotta	UD	12	Nov 26, 2011	Plaza de Toros Rea, Mazatlán, Mexico	Won vacant WBO bantamweight title
66	Win	58–6–2	Simphiwe Nongqayi	TKO	4 (12), 2:01	Sep 24, 2011	Foro PromoCasa, Mexicali, Mexico	Retained WBO junior featherweight title
65	Win	57–6–2	Wilfredo Vázquez Jr.	TKO	12 (12), 0:55	May 7, 2011	MGM Grand Garden Arena, Paradise, Nevada, U.S.	Won WBO junior featherweight title
64	Win	56–6–2	Adolfo Ramos	TKO	1 (10), 2:06	Dec 18, 2010	Estadio de Sóftbol "20 de Noviembre", Campeche City, Mexico	
63	Draw	55–6–2	Lorenzo Parra	SD	10	Sep 18, 2010	Estadio Banorte, Culiacán, Mexico	
62	Win	55–6–1	Martín Castillo	KO	1 (10), 2:56	Jul 31, 2010	Palenque de la Feria, Tepic, Mexico	
61	Win	54–6–1	Cecilio Santos	KO	7 (10), 0:58	Apr 24, 2010	Centro de Usos Múltiples, Ciudad Obregón, Mexico	
60	Win	53–6–1	Angky Angkotta	TD	7 (12), 1:34	Jan 30, 2010	Restaurante Arroyo, Mexico City, Mexico	Won vacant WBO super flyweight title; Unanimous TD after Angkotta was cut from an accidental head clash
59	Loss	52–6–1	Simphiwe Nongqayi	UD	12	Sep 15, 2009	Plaza de Toros, Cancún, Mexico	For vacant IBF super flyweight title
58	Win	52–5–1	Fernando Lumacad	KO	3 (12), 0:35	Jun 27, 2009	Boardwalk Hall, Atlantic City, New Jersey, U.S.	Won vacant IBF International super flyweight title
57	Loss	51–5–1	Vic Darchinyan	RTD	11 (12), 3:00	Feb 7, 2009	Honda Center, Anaheim, California, U.S.	For WBA (Super), WBC, and IBF super flyweight titles
56	Win	51–4–1	Isidro García	TKO	4 (12), 0:48	Nov 1, 2008	Mandalay Bay Events Center, Paradise, Nevada, U.S.	Retained WBA interim super flyweight title
55	Win	50–4–1	Rafael Concepción	RTD	9 (12), 3:00	Sep 15, 2008	Arena México, Mexico City, Mexico	Won WBA interim super flyweight title
54	Win	49–4–1	Devid Lookmahanak	MD	12	May 7, 2008	Plaza de Toros Monumental, Aguascalientes, Mexico	
53	Win	48–4–1	Medgoen Singsurat	TKO	1 (12), 0:47	Dec 1, 2007	Tingley Coliseum, Albuquerque, New Mexico, U.S.	Retained WBC Latino bantamweight title
52	Win	47–4–1	Tomás Rojas	TKO	6 (12), 1:00	Sep 16, 2007	The Joint, Paradise, Nevada, U.S.	Won vacant WBC Latino bantamweight title
51	Loss	46–4–1	Cristian Mijares	UD	12	Apr 14, 2007	Alamodome, San Antonio, Texas, U.S.	For WBC super flyweight title
50	Win	46–3–1	Julio David Roque Ler	UD	12	Jan 27, 2007	Honda Center, Anaheim, California, U.S.	
49	Win	45–3–1	Masibulele Makepula	TKO	4 (12), 1:00	Sep 23, 2006	Dodge Arena, Hidalgo, Texas, U.S.	
48	Win	44–3–1	Rosendo Álvarez	TKO	6 (12), 1:54	Apr 8, 2006	Thomas & Mack Center, Paradise, Nevada, U.S.	Retained WBC interim flyweight title
47	Win	43–3–1	Adonis Rivas	RTD	6 (12), 3:00	Jan 28, 2006	Plaza de Toros, Cancún, Mexico	Retained WBC interim flyweight title
46	Win	42–3–1	Adonis Rivas	TKO	10 (12), 1:20	Dec 16, 2005	Arena Monterrey, Monterrey, Mexico	Retained WBC interim flyweight title
45	Win	41–3–1	Hussein Hussein	TKO	2 (12), 2:50	Oct 8, 2005	Thomas & Mack Center, Paradise, Nevada, U.S.	Retained WBC interim flyweight title
44	Win	40–3–1	Angel Antonio Priolo	TKO	3 (12), 2:45	Jul 30, 2005	Estadio Arturo C. Nahl, La Paz, Mexico	Won vacant WBC interim flyweight title
43	Win	39–3–1	Hussein Hussein	TKO	10 (12), 2:07	Mar 19, 2005	MGM Grand Garden Arena, Paradise, Nevada, U.S.	
42	Win	38–3–1	Juan Francisco Centeno	TKO	3 (12), 2:48	Dec 18, 2004	Autonomous University of Sinaloa, Culiacán, Mexico	Retained WBC light flyweight title
41	Win	37–3–1	Juanito Rubillar	UD	12	Sep 4, 2004	Plaza de Toros, Tijuana, Mexico	Retained WBC light flyweight title
40	Win	36–3–1	Melchor Cob Castro	KO	5 (12), 1:57	Apr 24, 2004	Palenque de Gallos, Tuxtla Gutiérrez, Mexico	Retained WBC light flyweight title
39	Win	35–3–1	Joma Gamboa	KO	2 (12), 1:38	Jan 10, 2004	Centro Banamex, Mexico City, Mexico	Retained WBC light flyweight title
38	Win	34–3–1	Melchor Cob Castro	TD	6 (12), 3:00	May 3, 2003	Mandalay Bay Events Center, Paradise, Nevada, U.S.	Retained WBC light flyweight title; Unanimous TD after Arce was cut from an accidental head clash
37	Win	33–3–1	Lee Marvin Sandoval	TKO	2 (10), 2:43	Mar 21, 2003	Desert Diamond Casino, Tucson, Arizona, U.S.	
36	Win	32–3–1	Ernesto Castro	KO	1 (12), 1:40	Feb 22, 2003	Plaza de Toros, Mexico City, Mexico	Retained WBC light flyweight title
35	Win	31–3–1	Agustin Luna	TKO	3 (12), 2:13	Nov 16, 2002	Mandalay Bay Events Center, Paradise, Nevada, U.S.	Retained WBC light flyweight title
34	Win	30–3–1	Choi Yo-sam	TKO	6 (12), 1:21	Jul 6, 2002	Olympic Fencing Gymnasium, Seoul, South Korea	Won WBC light flyweight title
33	Win	29–3–1	Ramon Jose Hurtado	KO	2 (10), 1:00	Jun 7, 2002	Eldorado Resort Casino, Reno, Nevada, U.S.	
32	Win	28–3–1	Juanito Rubillar	UD	12	Oct 20, 2001	Auditorio Municipal, Tijuana, Mexico	Won vacant WBC interim light flyweight title
31	Win	27–3–1	Juan Jose Beltran	TKO	3 (10), 0:57	Feb 2, 2001	Jai Alai Fronton, Tijuana, Mexico	
30	Win	26–3–1	Carmelo Caceres	KO	2 (12)	Dec 8, 2000	Los Mochis, Mexico	Retained WBC Youth light flyweight title
29	Win	25–3–1	Jovan Presbitero	TKO	3 (10)	Oct 21, 2000	Salón 21, Mexico City, Mexico	Retained WBC Youth light flyweight title
28	Win	24–3–1	Alfredo Virgen	TKO	5 (10), 0:36	Oct 1, 2000	Celebrity Theatre, Phoenix, Arizona, U.S.	
27	Win	23–3–1	Emilio Palacios	KO	1 (10)	Jul 7, 2000	Palenque de Gallos, Villahermosa, Mexico	
26	Win	22–3–1	Juan Javier Lagos	UD	10	Apr 7, 2000	Auditorio Municipal, Tijuana, Mexico	Won vacant WBC Youth light flyweight title
25	Win	21–3–1	Ladislao Vazquez	MD	12	Nov 29, 1999	Auditorio Municipal, Tijuana, Mexico	Retained WBO–NABO light flyweight title
24	Loss	20–3–1	Michael Carbajal	TKO	11 (12), 1:53	Jul 31, 1999	Bullring by the Sea, Tijuana, Mexico	Lost WBO light flyweight title
23	Win	20–2–1	Salvatore Fanni	TKO	6 (12), 1:17	Apr 17, 1999	Palasport Roberta Serradimigni, Sassari, Italy	Retained WBO light flyweight title
22	Win	19–2–1	Juan Domingo Córdoba	UD	12	Dec 5, 1998	Auditorio Municipal, Tijuana, Mexico	Won WBO light flyweight title
21	Win	18–2–1	Jose de Jesus Gomez	KO	1	Oct 10, 1998	Auditorio Municipal, Tijuana, Mexico	
20	Win	17–2–1	Ruben Contreras	KO	7 (10), 0:40	Jun 5, 1998	Auditorio Municipal, Tijuana, Mexico	
19	Win	16–2–1	Miguel Martinez	KO	2	Apr 3, 1998	Auditorio Municipal, Tijuana, Mexico	
18	Win	15–2–1	Miguel Martinez	UD	12	Feb 6, 1998	Tijuana, Mexico	Won vacant WBO–NABO light flyweight title
17	Loss	14–2–1	Víctor Burgos	PTS	12	Dec 12, 1997	Auditorio Municipal, Tijuana, Mexico	Lost WBA Fedecentro light flyweight title
16	Win	14–1–1	Leonardo Gutierrez	PTS	12	Nov 12, 1997	Tijuana, Mexico	Won vacant WBA Fedecentro light flyweight title
15	Win	13–1–1	Lorenzo Trejo	UD	12	Jul 21, 1997	Grand Hotel, Tijuana, Mexico	Won vacant Mexican Pacific Coast light flyweight title
14	Win	12–1–1	Pablo Tiznado	PTS	10	May 26, 1997	Tijuana, Mexico	
13	Win	11–1–1	Ruben Arteaga	TKO	2	Apr 21, 1997	Tijuana, Mexico	
12	Win	10–1–1	Indalecio Valenzuela	TKO	2	Feb 21, 1997	Tijuana, Mexico	
11	Win	9–1–1	Narciso Perez	KO	1	Feb 3, 1997	Tijuana, Mexico	
10	Win	8–1–1	Ruben Romero	KO	2	Dec 20, 1996	Ensenada, Mexico	
9	Win	7–1–1	Marcos Hiedra	KO	1	Dec 9, 1996	Tijuana, Mexico	
8	Win	6–1–1	Armando Correa	TKO	2	Nov 29, 1996	Tijuana, Mexico	
7	Win	5–1–1	Mauricio Morales	TKO	3	Nov 4, 1996	Tijuana, Mexico	
6	Draw	4–1–1	Gabriel Munoz	PTS	4	Sep 9, 1996	Tijuana, Mexico	
5	Loss	4–1	Omar Niño Romero	TKO	1	Jun 21, 1996	Guadalajara, Mexico	
4	Win	4–0	Mario Enriquez	TKO	1	May 19, 1996	Tijuana, Mexico	
3	Win	3–0	Dano Diaz	KO	1 (4)	Apr 26, 1996	El Estadio de Béisbol del Ferrocarril, Mexicali, Mexico	
2	Win	2–0	Jose Santos	TKO	1	Mar 18, 1996	Tijuana, Mexico	
1	Win	1–0	Adan Aldama	KO	1 (4)	Jan 19, 1996	Tijuana, Mexico	

== Exhibition boxing record ==
4 fights	0 wins	0 losses
Non-scored	4	

No.	Result	Record	Opponent	Type	Round, time	Date	Location	Notes
4	—N/a	0–0 (4)	Erik Morales	—N/a	4	Jun 3, 2022	Marcelino Gonzalez Gymnasium, Zacatecas, Mexico	Non-scored bout
3	—N/a	0–0 (3)	Julio César Chávez	—N/a	4	Sep 25, 2020	Grand Hotel Tijuana, Tijuana, Mexico	Non-scored bout
2	—N/a	0–0 (2)	Julio César Chávez	—N/a	3	Feb 28, 2020	Hermosillo Multipurpose Center, Hermosillo, Mexico	Non-scored bout
1	—N/a	0–0 (1)	Julio César Chávez	—N/a	3	Nov 22, 2019	Auditorio Fausto Gutierrez Moreno, Tijuana, Mexico	Non-scored bout

== Titles in boxing ==
=== Major world titles ===
- WBC light flyweight champion (108 lbs)
- WBO light flyweight champion (108 lbs)
- WBO super flyweight champion (115 lbs)
- WBO bantamweight champion (118 lbs)
- WBO super bantamweight champion (122 lbs)

=== Interim world titles ===
- WBA interim super flyweight champion (115 lbs)
- WBC interim light flyweight champion (108 lbs)
- WBC interim flyweight champion (112 lbs)

=== Minor world titles ===
- WBC Youth light flyweight champion (108 lbs)

=== Regional/International titles ===
- Mexican Pacific Coast light flyweight champion (108 lbs)
- WBA Fedecentro light flyweight champion (108 lbs)
- NABO light flyweight champion (108 lbs)
- IBF International super flyweight champion (115 lbs)
- WBC Latino bantamweight champion (118 lbs)

=== Honorary titles ===
- WBC Otomi champion
- WBO Super Champion

== See also ==
- List of world light-flyweight boxing champions
- List of world super-flyweight boxing champions
- List of world bantamweight boxing champions
- List of world super-bantamweight boxing champions
- List of boxing quadruple champions
- List of Mexican boxing world champions
- Notable boxing families

Sporting positions
Regional boxing titles
New title	Mexican Pacific Coast light flyweight champion July 21, 1997 – November 1997; Vacated	Vacant Title next held by Fred Heberto Valdez
Vacant Title last held by Royers Vasquez	WBA Fedecentro light flyweight champion November 12, 1997 – December 12, 1997	Succeeded by Víctor Burgos
Vacant Title last held by Edgar Cardenas	WBO–NABO light flyweight champion February 6, 1998 – December 5, 1998; Won world title	Vacant Title next held by Himself
Vacant Title last held by Himself	WBO–NABO light flyweight champion November 29, 1999 – February 2000; Vacated	Vacant Title next held by Víctor Burgos
New title	WBC Youth light flyweight champion April 7, 2000 – October 20, 2001; Won interim world title	Vacant Title next held by Salikalek Or Ekarin
Vacant Title last held by Cristian Faccio	WBC Latino bantamweight champion September 16, 2007 – May 17, 2008; Won eliminator for world title	Vacant Title next held by Yan Bartelemí
New title	IBF International super flyweight champion June 27, 2009 – September 15, 2009; Lost bid for world title	Vacant Title next held by Juan Alberto Rosas
World boxing titles
Preceded by Juan Domingo Córdoba	WBO light flyweight champion December 5, 1998 – July 31, 1999	Succeeded by Michael Carbajal
New title	WBC light flyweight champion Interim title October 20, 2001 – July 6, 2002; Won full title	Vacant Title next held by Wandee Singwangcha
Preceded by Choi Yo-sam	WBC light flyweight champion July 6, 2002 – February 23, 2005; Vacated	Vacant Title next held by Hugo Cázares
Vacant Title last held by Chatchai Singwangcha	WBC flyweight champion Interim title July 30, 2005 – September 2006; Vacated	Vacant Title next held by Pongsaklek Wonjongkam
Preceded by Rafael Concepción	WBA super flyweight champion Interim title September 15, 2008 – February 7, 2009; Lost bid for Super title	Vacant Title next held by Nonito Donaire
Vacant Title last held by Marvin Sonsona	WBO super flyweight champion January 30, 2010 – April 2010; Vacated	Vacant Title next held by Omar Narváez
Preceded by Wilfredo Vázquez Jr.	WBO junior featherweight champion May 7, 2011 – November 2011; Vacated	Vacant Title next held by Nonito Donaire
Vacant Title last held by Nonito Donaire	WBO bantamweight champion November 26, 2011 – August 15, 2012; Vacated	Vacant Title next held by Pungluang Sor Singyu
