= Alimi Goitia =

Venezuelan boxer

Personal information
- Born: Alimi Alan Goitia; June 28, 1970 (age 56) Puerto Cabello, Venezuela
- Height: 5 ft 6 in (168 cm)
- Weight: Super flyweight

Boxing career
- Reach: 68 in (173 cm)
- Stance: Southpaw

Boxing record
- Total fights: 20
- Wins: 16
- Win by KO: 13
- Losses: 4

Alimi Alan Goitia (born June 28, 1970) is a Venezuelan former professional boxer who competed from 1993 to 2005. He won the World Boxing Association super flyweight title in 1995.

== Professional career ==
Goitia turned professional in 1993 and compiled a record of 11-0 before facing and defeating South Korean boxer Lee Hyung-chul, to win the WBA Super flyweight title. He would face Lee again in rematch, this time winning via 12th round stoppage He would lose go on to lose the title to Thai contender Yokthai Sithoar. In his final fight he would lose to future world champion Cristian Mijares.

== Professional boxing record ==
20 fights	16 wins	4 losses
By knockout	13	4
By decision	3	0

No.	Result	Record	Opponent	Type	Round, time	Date	Location	Notes
20	Loss	16–4	Cristian Mijares	TKO	3 (12)	2005-09-16	Auditorio Municipal, Torreon, Mexico	For vacant WBA Fedelatin super flyweight title
19	Win	16–3	Jose Echenique	TKO	7 (?)	2002-08-31	Yesterday Center, Turmero, Venezuela	
18	Loss	15–3	Cuauhtemoc Gomez	KO	2 (12)	1997-09-20	Mahi Temple Shrine Auditorium, Miami, Florida, U.S.	For WBA Fedelatin bantamweight title
17	Loss	15–2	Edison Torres	KO	10 (?)	1997-04-09	Turmero, Venezuela	
16	Loss	15–1	Yokthai Sithoar	TKO	8 (12)	1996-08-24	Provincial Gym, Kamphaeng Phet, Thailand	Lost WBA super flyweight title
15	Win	15–0	Satoshi Iida	TKO	5 (12)	1996-04-29	Rainbow Hall, Nagoya, Aichi, Japan	Retained WBA super flyweight title
14	Win	14–0	Lee Hyung-chul	TKO	12 (12)	1996-02-24	Changchung Gymnasium, Seoul, South Korea	Retained WBA super flyweight title
13	Win	13–0	Aquiles Guzmán	TKO	5 (12)	1995-11-25	Marina Bay Hotel, Porlamar, Venezuela	Retained WBA super flyweight title
12	Win	12–0	Lee Hyung-chul	KO	4 (12)	1995-07-22	Changchung Gymnasium, Seoul, South Korea	Won WBA super flyweight title
11	Win	11–0	Fernando Blanco	TKO	7 (12)	1995-04-01	Caracas, Venezuela	Retained WBA Fedelatin super flyweight title
10	Win	10–0	Julio Gamboa	KO	1 (12)	1994-11-26	Gimnasio Alexis Arguello, Managua, Nicaragua	Retained WBA Fedelatin super flyweight title
9	Win	9–0	Ernesto Briceno	TKO	1 (12)	1994-09-23	Maracay, Venezuela	Won WBA Fedelatin super flyweight title
8	Win	8–0	Edison Torres	UD	10 (10)	1994-07-22	Turmero, Venezuela	
7	Win	7–0	David Merchant	TKO	3 (?)	1994-04-29	Turmero, Venezuela	
6	Win	6–0	Jose Molina	TKO	2 (?)	1993-11-13	Caracas, Venezuela	
5	Win	5–0	Alexis Hernandez	KO	1 (?)	1993-10-02	Caracas, Venezuela	
4	Win	4–0	Luiz Longa	PTS	6 (6)	1993-08-06	Turmero, Venezuela	
3	Win	3–0	Frank Ilarraza	TKO	2 (?)	1993-06-26	Maracaibo, Venezuela	
2	Win	2–0	Euclides Bolivar	PTS	4 (4)	1993-05-07	Centro Recreacional Yesterday, Turmero, Venezuela	
1	Win	1–0	Jose Alvarez	KO	1 (?)	1993-03-26	Caracas, Venezuela	

== See also ==
- List of southpaw stance boxers
- List of world super-flyweight boxing champions

Sporting positions
World boxing titles
Preceded by Lee Hyung-chul	WBA super flyweight champion July 22, 1995 – August 24, 1996	Succeeded by Yokthai Sithoar
