= Thanomsak Sithbaobay =

Thai boxer

Personal information
- Nationality: Thai
- Born: Tanom Kongsankam (ถนอม คงแสนคำ); 5 April 1965 (age 61) Maha Sarakham, Thailand
- Weight: Flyweight; Junior bantamweight Bantamweight

Boxing career
- Stance: Orthodox

Boxing record
- Total fights: 62
- Wins: 56
- Win by KO: 33
- Losses: 6
- Draws: 0
- No contests: 0

Thanomsak Sithbaobay (Thai: ถนอมศักดิ์ ศิษย์โบ๊เบ๊; born: April 5, 1965, in Maha Sarakham province) is a retired Thai professional boxer who challenged the world champion three times but was not successful, like Chamroen Songkitrat in the 1950s. His other ring names, in order, were Thalerngsak Sithbaobay (เถลิงศักดิ์ ศิษย์โบ๊เบ๊), Khaoyai Mahasarakham (เขาใหญ่ มหาสารคาม), and Khaoyai Pitsanurachan (เขาใหญ่ พิษณุราชันย์).

== Biography & career ==
Sithbaobay debuted in 1985 and won the Rajadamnern Stadium Flyweight Championship (comparable to the Thailand national title) in 1986. That same year, he also captured the OPBF title.

Later, in 1989, when Khaokor Galaxy lost the WBA Bantamweight Title to Filipino boxer Luisito Espinosa, his manager, Niwat "Chae-mae" Laosuwanwat (who also managed the Galaxy brothers), arranged for him to challenge Espinosa for the title on November 29, 1990, at Rajadamnern Stadium in Bangkok. However, he was defeated by unanimous decision.

After Khaosai Galaxy retired, leaving the WBA Junior Bantamweight Title vacant, he was encouraged to challenge for the vacant belt against Japan's Katsuya "Spanky" Onizuka on April 10, 1992, at Tokyo Metropolitan Gymnasium. He lost again.

He had a rematch with Onizuka on November 5, 1993, at Ariake Coliseum in Tokyo but was once again defeated.

On May 5, 1996, he fought in a WBC Bantamweight title eliminator bout against rising star Sirimongkol Singmanasak. He was knocked out in the third round.

His final fight was in 1998, losing to Japanese-Korean boxer Tetsutora Senrima in Kōbe, Japan. He retired afterward.
