= Katsuya Onizuka =

Japanese boxer

Katsuya Onizuka 鬼塚 勝也
Personal information
- Nickname: Spanky-K
- Nationality: Japanese
- Born: Takashi Onizuka; March 12, 1970 (age 56) Kitakyushu, Fukuoka, Japan
- Height: 5 ft 8 in (173 cm)
- Weight: Super flyweight

Boxing career
- Stance: Orthodox

Boxing record
- Total fights: 25
- Wins: 24
- Win by KO: 17
- Losses: 1

Katsuya Onizuka (鬼塚 勝也, Onizuka Katsuya; born Takashi Onizuka; March 12, 1970) is a former WBA Super Flyweight champion from Kitakyushu, Japan. Onizuka was an extremely popular boxer in Japan, creating a boxing boom in Japan during the early 1990s along with Joichiro Tatsuyoshi.

== Biography ==
Onizuka began boxing in middle school, entering a local boxing gym to begin training. He won several high amateur boxing tournaments in high school, but lost a match in his senior year against Hiroshi Kawashima, who would later win the WBC Super Flyweight title. Onizuka had already been accepted to Kinki University, but decided to turn pro after being battered in a sparring session with Hiroki Ioka, who had just become the WBC Minimumweight champion. He entered the Kyoei boxing gym in Tokyo, and made his professional debut in 1988 as a flyweight.

Onizuka quickly built up his record, and won the Japanese Super Flweight title in October, 1990, which he defended three times before moving on to challenge the world title. His first world title match came in April, 1992, fighting Thanomsak Sithbaobay for the WBA Super Flyweight title, which had been vacated by legendary Thai boxer Khaosai Galaxy. Onizuka won a close 12-round decision, the first of the series of controversial wins in his career. Akinobu Hiranaka also won the WBA Super Lightweight title in Mexico the same day.

He defended his title for the first time on September 11, 1992, winning by TKO in the 5th round. This would be his only non-decision win in world title fights. He fought Mexican fighter Armando Castro three months later for his second defense, and won an indisputable victory. This fight was the height of Onizuka's career.

Onizuka's third defense came on May 21, 1993, against Korean fighter Jae-Shin Lim, who had previously fought with the alias, "Kotaro Hayashi." Onizuka was predicted to win easily, but the challenger pummeled Onizuka throughout the fight, and Onizuka barely won by split decision. Two of the three judges of the fight were Japanese, and had both scored the bout in favor of Onizuka, making the fight one of the worst and most obvious cases of a hometown decision.

After his controversial fight, Onizuka fought Thanomsak Sithbaobay for the second time, and made his fourth defense by another close 12-round decision. He made a fifth successful defense by 12-round decision on April 10, 1994, despite having been knocked down for the first time in his professional career in the 5th round. Onizuka finally lost in his sixth defense on September 18, 1994, against Lee Hyung-chul no.1 WBA challenger, where he was trapped in the corner and beaten relentlessly for over a minute by the challenger. The referee finally stopped the fight in the 9th round, and Onizuka lost his title after two years of controversial defences. He was found to have a detached retina in the right eye after the fight, and announced his retirement. Onizuka explained that he had actually suspected an injury in his right eye over two years ago, but had kept it to himself to avoid being forced into retirement. His record was 24-1-0 (17KOs).

== Professional boxing record ==
25 fights	24 wins	1 loss
By knockout	17	1
By decision	7	0

No.	Result	Record	Opponent	Type	Round, time	Date	Location	Notes
25	Loss	24–1	Lee Hyung-chul	TKO	9 (12)	1994-09-18	Yoyogi National Gymnasium, Tokyo, Japan	Lost WBA super flyweight title
24	Win	24–0	Seung Koo Lee	UD	12 (12)	1994-04-03	Kokugikan, Tokyo, Japan	Retained WBA super flyweight title
23	Win	23–0	Thanomsak Sithbaobay	UD	12 (12)	1993-11-05	Ariake Coliseum, Tokyo, Japan	Retained WBA super flyweight title
22	Win	22–0	Jae Shin Lim	SD	12 (12)	1993-05-21	Nippon Budokan, Tokyo, Japan	Retained WBA super flyweight title
21	Win	21–0	Armando Castro	UD	12 (12)	1992-12-11	Ariake Coliseum, Tokyo, Japan	Retained WBA super flyweight title
20	Win	20–0	Kenji Matsumura	TKO	5 (12)	1992-09-11	Nippon Budokan, Tokyo, Japan	Retained WBA super flyweight title
19	Win	19–0	Thanomsak Sithbaobay	UD	12 (12)	1992-04-10	Metropolitan Gym, Tokyo, Japan	Won vacant WBA super flyweight title
18	Win	18–0	Chan Woo Park	TKO	7 (10)	1991-11-04	Nishi Nihon Sogo Hall, Kitakyushu, Japan	
17	Win	17–0	Suzuharu Kitazawa	KO	5 (10)	1991-06-17	Korakuen Hall, Tokyo, Japan	Retained Japanese super flyweight title
16	Win	16–0	Shunichi Nakajima	PTS	10 (10)	1991-03-18	Korakuen Hall, Tokyo, Japan	Retained Japanese super flyweight title
15	Win	15–0	Tomohiko Yokoyama	KO	1 (10)	1990-12-17	Korakuen Hall, Tokyo, Japan	Retained Japanese super flyweight title
14	Win	14–0	Shunichi Nakajima	TKO	10 (10)	1990-10-15	Korakuen Hall, Tokyo, Japan	Won Japanese super flyweight title
13	Win	13–0	Tatsuya Sugi	TKO	7 (10)	1990-05-22	City Hall, Hōfu, Japan	
12	Win	12–0	Rex Rapiso	KO	1 (10)	1990-03-19	Korakuen Hall, Tokyo, Japan	
11	Win	11–0	Kyung Min Ahn	KO	1 (10)	1989-12-18	Korakuen Hall, Tokyo, Japan	
10	Win	10–0	Dok Hyun Kim	KO	5 (10)	1989-10-16	Korakuen Hall, Tokyo, Japan	
9	Win	9–0	Sang Won Lee	KO	4 (10)	1989-08-21	Korakuen Hall, Tokyo, Japan	
8	Win	8–0	Masao Kawanishi	KO	2 (8)	1989-05-15	Korakuen Hall, Tokyo, Japan	
7	Win	7–0	Yutaka Sakamoto	KO	2 (6)	1989-02-27	Korakuen Hall, Tokyo, Japan	
6	Win	6–0	Mitsumasa Ikeda	PTS	6 (6)	1988-12-21	Korakuen Hall, Tokyo, Japan	
5	Win	5–0	Ryoji Take	KO	3 (4)	1988-11-09	Korakuen Hall, Tokyo, Japan	
4	Win	4–0	Tetsuya Esu	KO	3 (4)	1988-09-19	Korakuen Hall, Tokyo, Japan	
3	Win	3–0	Shigeru Ito	KO	1 (4)	1988-07-18	Korakuen Hall, Tokyo, Japan	
2	Win	2–0	Satoshi Kada	KO	1 (4)	1988-06-20	Korakuen Hall, Tokyo, Japan	
1	Win	1–0	Shoji Akiyama	KO	1 (4)	1988-04-18	Korakuen Hall, Tokyo, Japan	

== Post-retirement ==
Onizuka lived away from boxing for a while after retirement, but now trains young boxers at his boxing gym in his hometown, Fukuoka. He often appears on TBS boxing broadcasts as a commentator. Fans were reminded of Onizuka's controversial wins when Koki Kameda won a hometown decision to become the WBA Light Flyweight champion in 2006. Both Kameda and Onizuka were trained and managed by the Kyoei boxing gym, and Onizuka has appeared as a commentator in several of Kameda's fights. Onizuka also endorsed a SNES video game, Onizuka Katsuya Super Virtual Boxing.

== See also ==
- Boxing in Japan
- List of Japanese boxing world champions
- List of world super-flyweight boxing champions

Sporting positions
Regional boxing titles
Preceded by Shunichi Nakajima	Japanese super flyweight champion October 15, 1990 – 1991; Vacated	Vacant Title next held by Suzuharu Kitazawa
World boxing titles
Vacant Title last held by Khaosai Galaxy	WBA super flyweight champion April 10, 1992 – September 18, 1994	Succeeded by Lee Hyung-chul
