= List of WBA world champions =

This is a list of WBA world champions, showing every world champion certified by the World Boxing Association (WBA). The list also includes champions certified by the National Boxing Association (NBA), the predecessor to the WBA.

Boxers who won the title but were stripped due to the title bout being overturned to a no contest are not listed i.e. Evgeny Tishchenko won the inaugural bridgerweight title but was subsequently stripped after testing positive for banned substance.

In December 2000, the WBA created an unprecedented situation of having a split championship in the same weight class by introducing a new title called Super world, commonly referred to simply as Super. The Super champion is the WBA's primary champion, while the World champion – commonly known as the Regular champion by boxing publications – is only considered the primary champion by the other three major sanctioning bodies (WBC, IBF, and WBO) if the Super title is vacant.

A Unified champion is a boxer that holds the primary WBA title and one or two from another major sanctioning body (WBC, IBF, WBO) simultaneously. An Undisputed champion as defined by the WBA, only needs to hold three of the four major titles but in some cases they may change a Super champion into an Undisputed champion after a failed title defense (e.g. Anselmo Moreno losing to Juan Payano and Chris John losing to Simpiwe Vetyeka). This is not to be confused by professional boxing's own definition of an undisputed champion, in which a boxer must hold all four major titles.

There are two tables per section. The primary champion lineage prioritizes the Super champions. If the Super title is vacant, then the Undisputed / Unified title is listed. If both are vacant, then the Regular title becomes the primary champion. The secondary champion lineage lists the Regular or Unified champions while the primary champion is occupied.

- Every Super champion is the primary champion.
- A Regular champion is a primary champion only if Super, Undisputed and Unified is vacant.
- A Unified champion is a primary champion only if Super is vacant.
- Not every Regular or Unified champion gets promoted to Super if it is vacant.
- Not every Regular champion gets to fight for the vacant Super title.
- A Regular or Unified champion that is considered the primary champion is relegated to secondary champion if Super gets occupied.

Starting from August 2021, any new champions in the primary champion lineage will not be marked as Regular, Unified, Undisputed or Super because of the WBA's title reduction plan.

Current champion
Most consecutive title defenses

== Heavyweight ==
=== Primary champion lineage ===
No.	Name	Reign	Defenses
1	Jack Dempsey (awarded inaugural title)	Jan 1921 – 23 Sep 1926	3
2	Gene Tunney	23 Sep 1926 – 31 Jul 1928	2
Tunney retires.
3	Max Schmeling (def. Jack Sharkey)	12 Jun 1930 – 21 Jun 1932	1
4	Jack Sharkey	21 Jun 1932 – 29 Jun 1933	0
5	Primo Carnera	29 Jun 1933 – 14 Jun 1934	1
6	Max Baer	14 Jun 1934 – 13 Jun 1935	0
7	James J. Braddock	13 Jun 1935 – 22 Jun 1937	0
8	Joe Louis	22 Jun 1937 – 1 Mar 1949	25
Louis vacated the title and retired, but would come back a year later to fight Ezzard Charles.
9	Ezzard Charles (def. Jersey Joe Walcott)	22 Jun 1949 – 18 Jul 1951	8
10	Jersey Joe Walcott	18 Jul 1951 – 23 Sep 1952	1
11	Rocky Marciano	23 Sep 1952 – 27 Apr 1956	6
Marciano retires.
12	Floyd Patterson (def. Archie Moore)	30 Nov 1956 – 26 Jun 1959	3
13	Ingemar Johansson	26 Jun 1959 – 20 Jun 1960	0
14	Floyd Patterson (2)	20 Jun 1960 – 25 Sep 1962	2
The NBA changes its name to WBA on 23 August 1962, making Patterson the first WBA heavyweight champion and last NBA heavyweight champion.
15	Sonny Liston	25 Sep 1962 – 25 Feb 1964	1
16	Muhammad Ali	25 Feb – 14 Sep 1964	0
Ali was stripped of the title for signing to a rematch with Liston.
17	Ernie Terrell (def. Eddie Machen)	5 Mar 1965 – 6 Feb 1967	2
18	Muhammad Ali (2)	6 Feb – 28 Apr 1967	1
Ali was stripped of the title due to his refusal to be drafted to Army service.
19	Jimmy Ellis (def. Jerry Quarry)	27 Apr 1968 – 16 Feb 1970	1
20	Joe Frazier	16 Feb 1970 – 22 Jan 1973	4
21	George Foreman	22 Jan 1973 – 30 Oct 1974	2
22	Muhammad Ali (3)	30 Oct 1974 – 15 Feb 1978	10
23	Leon Spinks	15 Feb – 15 Sep 1978	0
24	Muhammad Ali (4)	15 Sep 1978 – 3 Jul 1979	0
Ali vacated the title and retired, but would come back a year later to fight Larry Holmes.
25	John Tate (def. Gerrie Coetzee)	20 Oct 1979 – 31 Mar 1980	0
26	Mike Weaver	31 Mar 1980 – 10 Dec 1982	2
27	Michael Dokes	10 Dec 1982 – 23 Sep 1983	1
28	Gerrie Coetzee	23 Sep 1983 – 1 Dec 1984	0
29	Greg Page	1 Dec 1984 – 29 Apr 1985	0
30	Tony Tubbs	29 Apr 1985 – 17 Jan 1986	0
31	Tim Witherspoon	17 Jan – 12 Dec 1986	1
32	James Smith	12 Dec 1986 – 7 Mar 1987	0
33	Mike Tyson	7 Mar 1987 – 11 Feb 1990	8
34	Buster Douglas	11 Feb – 25 Oct 1990	0
35	Evander Holyfield	25 Oct 1990 – 13 Nov 1992	3
36	Riddick Bowe	13 Nov 1992 – 6 Nov 1993	2
37	Evander Holyfield (2)	6 Nov 1993 – 22 Apr 1994	0
38	Michael Moorer	22 Apr – 5 Nov 1994	0
39	George Foreman (2)	5 Nov 1994 – 4 Mar 1995	0
Foreman was stripped after refusing to fight mandatory challenger Tony Tucker.
40	Bruce Seldon (def. Tony Tucker)	8 Apr 1995 – 7 Sep 1996	1
41	Mike Tyson (2)	7 Sep – 9 Nov 1996	0
42	Evander Holyfield (3)	9 Nov 1996 – 13 Nov 1999	4
43	Lennox Lewis	13 Nov 1999 – 12 Apr 2000	0
Lewis was stripped after agreeing to fight WBC challenger Michael Grant instead of John Ruiz. Ruiz challenged this decision in court on the basis of a clause in the Lewis–Holyfield rematch contract which said Lewis's first bout as undisputed champion would be against the WBA's number one contender.
44	Evander Holyfield (4) (def. John Ruiz)	12 Aug 2000 – 3 Mar 2001	0
45	John Ruiz	3 Mar 2001 – 1 Mar 2003	2
46	Roy Jones Jr.	1 Mar 2003 – 24 Feb 2004	0
Jones Jr. vacated the title to stay at light heavyweight.
47	John Ruiz (2) (interim champion promoted)	24 Feb 2004 – 17 Dec 2005	2
48	Nikolai Valuev	17 Dec 2005 – 14 Apr 2007	3
49	Ruslan Chagaev	14 Apr 2007 – 3 Jul 2008	2
Chagaev tore his achilles tendon and was declared champion in recess.
50	Nikolai Valuev (2) (def. John Ruiz)	30 Aug 2008 – 7 Nov 2009	1
51	David Haye	7 Nov 2009 – 2 Jul 2011	2
Haye fought for the inaugural Unified title against Wladimir Klitschko.
52	Wladimir Klitschko – Unified champion (def. David Haye)	2 Jul – Aug 2011	0
52	Promoted to Super champion on WBA's July 2011 official ratings posted on August.		
52	Wladimir Klitschko – Super champion (Unified champion promoted)	Aug 2011 – 28 Nov 2015	8
53	Tyson Fury	28 Nov – 10 Dec 2015	0
53	Fury was recognized as Unified champion on WBA's November rankings posted on 10 December.		
53	Tyson Fury – Unified champion	10 Dec 2015 – 12 Oct 2016	0
Fury vacated the title after cancelling a rematch with Wladimir Klitschko for a second time, citing depression after a positive test for cocaine.
54	Anthony Joshua – Super champion (def. Wladimir Klitschko)	29 Apr 2017 – 1 Jun 2019	3
55	Andy Ruiz Jr.	1 Jun – 7 Dec 2019	0
56	Anthony Joshua (2)	7 Dec 2019 – 25 Sep 2021	1
57	Oleksandr Usyk	25 Sep 2021 – 26 Jun 2026	6
Usyk vacated the title.
58	Murat Gassiev – Regular champion (Primary champion vacant)	26 Jun 2026 – present	1

=== Secondary champion lineage ===
No.	Name	Reign	Defenses
1	Alexander Povetkin (def. Ruslan Chagaev)	27 Aug 2011 – 5 Oct 2013	4
Povetkin lost against Super champion Wladimir Klitschko.
2	Ruslan Chagaev (def. Fres Oquendo)	6 Jul 2014 – 5 Mar 2016	1
3	Lucas Browne	5 Mar – 12 May 2016	0
Browne was stripped for failing the post fight drug test but the bout was not overturned to a no contest.
4	Ruslan Chagaev (2) (reinstated)	12 May – 25 Jul 2016	0
Chagaev was stripped of the title for failing to pay the sanctioning fees.
5	Mahmoud Charr (def. Alexander Ustinov)	25 Nov 2017 – 29 Jan 2021	0
Charr declared champion in recess.
6	Trevor Bryan (def. Bermane Stiverne)	29 Jan 2021 – 11 Jun 2022	1
7	Daniel Dubois	11 Jun 2022 – 26 Aug 2023	1
Dubois lost against Super champion Oleksandr Usyk.
8	Mahmoud Charr (2) (reinstated by court ruling)	31 Aug 2023 – 7 Dec 2024	0
9	Kubrat Pulev	7 Dec 2024 – 12 Dec 2025	0
10	Murat Gassiev	12 Dec 2025 – 26 Jun 2026	0
Move to primary champion due to its vacancy.

== Bridgerweight ==
No.	Name	Reign	Defenses
1	Muslim Gadzhimagomedov (def. Zhaoxin Zhang)	12 Jul 2024 – 30 Jun 2026	1
WBA announced it would be discontinuing the division. It was formally discontinued on 30 June.

== Cruiserweight ==
=== Primary champion lineage ===
No.	Name	Reign	Defenses
1	Ossie Ocasio (def. Robbie Williams)	13 Feb 1982 – 1 Dec 1984	3
2	Piet Crous	1 Dec 1984 – 27 Jul 1985	1
3	Dwight Muhammad Qawi	27 Jul 1985 – 12 Jul 1986	1
4	Evander Holyfield	12 Jul 1986 – Dec 1988	5
Holyfield vacated the title to move up to heavyweight full time.
5	Taoufik Belbouli (def. Michael Greer)	25 Mar – 11 Aug 1989	0
Belbouli was injured and was expected to be stripped on 11 August.
6	Robert Daniels (def. Dwight Muhammad Qawi)	27 Nov 1989 – 8 Mar 1991	2
7	Bobby Czyz	8 Mar 1991 – Oct 1993	2
Czyz was involved in a car accident and he had to vacate the title for his inability to defend it.
8	Orlin Norris (def. Marcelo Figueroa)	6 Nov 1993 – 22 Jul 1995	4
9	Nate Miller	22 Jul 1995 – 8 Nov 1997	4
10	Fabrice Tiozzo	8 Nov 1997 – 9 Dec 2000	4
11	Virgil Hill	9 Dec 2000 – 23 Feb 2002	0
12	Jean-Marc Mormeck	23 Feb 2002 – 2 Apr 2005	3
12	Mormeck fought for the Unified title against WBC champion Wayne Braithwaite.		
12	Jean-Marc Mormeck – Unified champion (def. Wayne Braithwaite)	2 Apr 2005 – 7 Jan 2006	0 (3)
13	O'Neil Bell	7 Jan 2006 – 17 Mar 2007	0
14	Jean-Marc Mormeck (2)	17 Mar – 10 Nov 2007	0
15	David Haye	10 Nov 2007 – 12 May 2008	1
15	Status changes to Undisputed champion after winning against WBO champion Enzo Maccarinelli.		
15	David Haye – Undisputed champion (def. Enzo Maccarinelli)	8 Mar – 14 May 2008	0 (1)
15	Status changes to Unified champion on WBA's April 2008 ratings posted on 14 May, just days after vacating his WBC title.		
15	David Haye – Unified champion	14 May – 19 Jun 2008	0 (1)
Haye intends to move up to heavyweight. The title is vacated on WBA's May 2008 official ratings posted on 19 June.
16	Firat Arslan – Regular champion (Primary champion vacant)	19 Jun – 27 Sep 2008	0
17	Guillermo Jones	27 Sep 2008 – 30 Oct 2012	2
Jones was declared champion in recess.
18	Denis Lebedev (interim champion promoted); (Primary champion vacant)	30 Oct 2012 – 21 May 2016	4
18	Lebedev fought for Super title against IBF champion Víctor Ramírez.		
18	Denis Lebedev – Super champion (def. Víctor Ramírez)	21 May 2016 – 1 Feb 2018	1 (5)
WBA changed Lebedev's status to champion in recess in order to allow Yuniel Dorticos to unify his title with IBF champion Murat Gassiev. Lebedev had lost a bout against Gassiev where only the IBF title was on the line.
19	Yuniel Dorticos – Regular champion (Primary champion vacant)	1 Feb – 3 Feb 2018	0
Dorticos fought for Unified title against IBF champion Murat Gassiev.
20	Murat Gassiev – Unified champion (def. Yuniel Dorticos)	3 Feb – 21 Jul 2018	0
Gassiev fought WBC and WBO champion Oleksandr Usyk for the Super title.
21	Oleksandr Usyk – Super champion (def. Murat Gassiev)	21 Jul 2018 – 27 Mar 2019	1
Usyk vacated the title and moved up to heavyweight.
22	Beibut Shumenov – Regular champion (Primary champion vacant)	27 Mar – 31 May 2019	0
Shumenov stripped of title after failing to meet the terms of the purse bid between him and Arsen Goulamirian.
23	Arsen Goulamirian (interim champion promoted); (Primary champion vacant)	31 May – 1 Sep 2019	0
23	Goulamirian promoted to Super champion on WBA's August 2019 official ratings posted on 1 September.		
23	Arsen Goulamirian – Super champion (Regular champion promoted)	1 Sep 2019 – 30 Mar 2024	3
24	Gilberto Ramírez	30 Mar – 6 Apr 2024	0
24	Ramirez becomes World champion in WBA's March 2024 official ratings posted on 6 April.		
24	Gilberto Ramírez	6 Apr – 31 Oct 2024	0
24	Ramirez listed as Super champion in WBA's October 2024 official ratings posted on November 4.		
24	Gilberto Ramírez – Super champion	4 Nov 2024 – 2 May 2026	2
25	David Benavidez	2 May 2026 – present	0

=== Secondary champion lineage ===
No.	Name	Reign	Defenses
1	Virgil Hill (def. Valery Brudov)	27 Jan 2006 – 24 Nov 2007	0
2	Firat Arslan	24 Nov 2007 – 19 Jun 2008	2
Moved to primary champion due to its vacancy.
3	Beibut Shumenov (def. Junior Anthony Wright)	21 May 2016 – 20 Jun 2017	0
Shumenov vacated the title after cancelling a defense fight multiple times against Yuniel Dorticos, due to an eye injury.
4	Yuniel Dorticos (interim champion promoted)	20 Jun 2017 – 1 Feb 2018	1
Moved to primary champion due to its vacancy.
5	Beibut Shumenov (2) (def. Hizni Altunkaya)	7 Jul 2018 – 27 Mar 2019	0
Moved to primary champion due to its vacancy.
6	Beibut Shumenov (3) (reinstated)	1 Sep 2019 – 29 Jan 2021	0
Shumenov stripped of title due to inactivity.
7	Ryad Merhy (interim champion promoted)	29 Jan 2021 – 12 Aug 2022	1
Merhy vacated the title.
8	Jai Opetaia (def. Noel Mikaelian)	12 Sep 2026 – present	0

== Light heavyweight ==
=== Primary champion lineage ===
No.	Name	Reign	Defenses
1	Georges Carpentier (awarded inaugural title)	Jan 1921 – 24 Sep 1922	1
2	Battling Siki	24 Sep 1922 – 17 Mar 1923	0
3	Mike McTigue	17 Mar 1923 – 30 May 1925	1
4	Paul Berlenbach	30 May 1925 – 16 Jul 1926	3
5	Jack Delaney	16 July 1926 – 26 July 1927	1
Delaney vacated the title to move up to the heavyweight division.
6	Jimmy Slattery (def. Maxie Rosenbloom)	30 Aug – 12 Dec 1927	0
7	Tommy Loughran	12 Dec 1927 – 3 Sep 1929	5
Loughran vacated the title to move up to the heavyweight division.
8	Maxie Rosenbloom (awarded title)	Sep 1930 – 6 Jun 1931	1
Rosenbloom is stripped of the title for failing to defend the title in a timely manner.
9	George Nichols (def. Dave Maier)	18 Mar – 17 Dec 1932	0
Nichols stripped for failing to defend the title within the eight month time limit.
10	Joe Knight (awarded title)	Feb 26 – 1 Mar 1933	0
11	Bob Godwin	1 Mar – 24 Mar 1933	0
12	Maxie Rosenbloom (2)	24 Mar 1933 – 17 Sep 1934	2
Rosenbloom is stripped of the title because the NBA disliked his "clowning tactics and criticizing opponents in the ring".
13	Bob Olin (def. Maxie Rosenbloom)	16 Nov 1934 – 31 Oct 1935	0
14	John Henry Lewis	31 Oct 1935 – 19 Jun 1939	5
Lewis is stripped of the title for failing to defend it within the required six month limit and was virtually blind in his left eye.
15	Billy Conn (def. Melio Bettina)	13 Jul 1939 – 20 Dec 1940	3
Conn vacated the title to move up to the heavyweight division.
16	Anton Christoforidis (def. Melio Bettina)	13 Jan – 24 May 1941	0
17	Gus Lesnevich	24 May 1941 – 26 Jul 1948	5
18	Freddie Mills	26 Jul 1948 – 24 Jan 1950	0
19	Joey Maxim	24 Jan 1950 – 17 Dec 1952	2
20	Archie Moore	17 Dec 1952 – 25 Oct 1960	8
Moore was stripped of the title for failing to fight Eric Schoeppner.
21	Harold Johnson (def. Jesse Bowdry)	7 Feb 1961 – 1 Jun 1963	4
22	Willie Pastrano	1 Jun 1963 – 30 Mar 1965	2
23	José Torres	30 Mar 1965 – 16 Dec 1966	3
24	Dick Tiger	16 Dec 1966 – 24 May 1968	2
25	Bob Foster	24 May 1968 – 9 Dec 1970	4
Foster was stripped of the title for failing to post a $5,000 forfeit bond for the fight with Jimmy Dupree within 10 days after losing to Joe Frazier.
26	Vicente Rondón (def. Jimmy Dupree)	27 Feb 1971 – 7 Apr 1972	4
27	Bob Foster (2)	7 Apr 1972 – 16 Sep 1974	5
Foster retires.
28	Víctor Galíndez (def. Len Hutchins)	7 Dec 1974 – 15 Sep 1978	10
29	Mike Rossman	15 Sep 1978 – 14 Apr 1979	1
30	Víctor Galíndez (2)	14 April – 30 Nov 1979	0
31	Marvin Johnson	30 Nov 1979 – 31 Mar 1980	0
32	Eddie Mustafa Muhammad	31 Mar 1980 – 18 Jul 1981	2
33	Michael Spinks	18 Jul 1981 – 5 Nov 1985	10
Spinks vacated the title to stay at heavyweight.
34	Marvin Johnson (2) (def. Leslie Stewart)	9 Feb 1986 – 23 May 1987	1
35	Leslie Stewart	23 May – 5 Sep 1987	0
36	Virgil Hill	5 Sep 1987 – 3 Jun 1991	10
37	Thomas Hearns	3 Jun 1991 – 20 Mar 1992	0
38	Iran Barkley	20 Mar – 27 May 1992	0
Barkley vacated the title to stay at super middleweight.
39	Virgil Hill (2) (def. Frank Tate)	29 Sep 1992 – 13 Jun 1997	10
40	Dariusz Michalczewski	13 Jun – 1 Jul 1997	0
The WBA stripped Michalczewski of the title 18 days later for displaying its belt along with that of the WBO and subsequently refusing to give up his WBO title.
41	Lou Del Valle (def. Eddy Smulders)	20 Sep 1997 – 18 Jul 1998	0
42	Roy Jones Jr.	18 Jul 1998 – Dec 2000	5
42	Jones Jr. promoted to inaugural Super champion on WBA's December 2000 official ratings.		
42	Roy Jones Jr. – Super champion (Regular champion promoted)	Dec 2000 – 5 Aug 2002	3 (8)
42	Status changes to Unified champion on WBA's July 2002 official ratings posted on 5 August.		
42	Roy Jones Jr. – Unified champion	5 Aug 2002 – 15 Apr 2003	1 (9)
Jones Jr. vacates the title to stay at heavyweight.
43	Mehdi Sahnoune – Regular champion (Primary champion vacant)	15 Apr – 10 Oct 2003	0
44	Silvio Branco	10 Oct – 8 Nov 2003	0
Branco is relegated since Roy Jones Jr. won the vacant Unified title.
45	Roy Jones Jr. (2) – Unified champion (def. Antonio Tarver)	8 Nov 2003 – 15 May 2004	0
46	Antonio Tarver	15 May – 3 Jul 2004	0
Tarver was stripped of the title and removed from WBA's June 2004 official ratings posted on 3 July 2004.
47	Fabrice Tiozzo – Regular champion (Primary champion vacant)	3 Jul 2004 – 19 Oct 2006	1
Tiozzo vacated the title and retired after defeating Dariusz Michalczewski.
48	Silvio Branco (2) (interim champion promoted); (Primary champion vacant)	19 Oct 2006 – 28 Apr 2007	0
49	Stipe Drviš	28 Apr – 16 Dec 2007	0
50	Danny Green	16 Dec 2007 – 25 Mar 2008	0
Green vacated the title and retired.
51	Hugo Garay (def. Yuriy Barashian); (Primary champion vacant)	3 Jul 2008 – 20 Jun 2009	1
52	Gabriel Campillo	20 Jun 2009 – 29 Jan 2010	1
53	Beibut Shumenov	29 Jan 2010 – 8 Oct 2013	5
53	Shumenov promoted to Super champion.		
53	Beibut Shumenov – Super champion (Regular champion promoted)	8 Oct 2013 – 19 Apr 2014	1 (6)
54	Bernard Hopkins	19 Apr – 8 Nov 2014	0
Hopkins fought WBO champion Sergey Kovalev for the Undisputed title.
55	Sergey Kovalev – Undisputed champion (def. Bernard Hopkins)	8 Nov 2014 – 19 Nov 2016	4
56	Andre Ward	19 Nov 2016 – 21 Sep 2017	1
Ward retires from boxing.
57	Badou Jack – Regular champion (Primary champion vacant)	21 Sep – 23 Sep 2017	0
Jack vacated the title to avoid a purse bid with interim champion Dmitry Bivol and opted to seek opportunities with bigger names. On 14 Oct 2017, Bivol was promoted to world champion.
58	Dmitry Bivol (interim champion promoted); (Primary champion vacant)	14 Oct 2017 – 10 Oct 2019	5
58	Bivol promoted to Super champion before fighting Lenin Castillo.		
58	Dmitry Bivol – Super champion (Regular champion promoted)	10 Oct 2019 – 12 Oct 2024	7 (12)
59	Artur Beterbiev	12 Oct 2024 – 22 Feb 2025	0
60	Dmitry Bivol (2)	22 Feb 2025 – present	1

=== Secondary champion lineage ===
No.	Name	Reign	Defenses
1	Bruno Girard (def. Robert Koon)	22 Dec 2001 – 8 Mar 2003	2
2	Mehdi Sahnoune	8 Mar – 15 Apr 2003	0
Moved to primary champion due to its vacancy.
3	Silvio Branco (relegated from primary champion)	8 Nov 2003 – 20 Feb 2004	0
4	Fabrice Tiozzo	20 Feb – 3 Jul 2004	0
Moved to primary champion due to its vacancy.
5	Jürgen Brähmer (def. Marcus Oliveira)	14 Dec 2013 – 1 Oct 2016	6
6	Nathan Cleverly	1 Oct 2016 – 26 Aug 2017	0
7	Badou Jack	26 Aug – 21 Sep 2017	0
Moved to primary champion due to its vacancy.
8	Jean Pascal (interim champion promoted)	10 Oct 2019 – 8 Jul 2021	1
Pascal is stripped of his title for testing positive for banned substances and is also suspended for six months.
9	David Morrell (def. Radivoje Kalajdzic)	3 Aug 2024 – 1 Feb 2025	0
10	David Benavidez	1 Feb 2025 – 1 Oct 2026	1
Benavidez vacated the title to stay at cruiserweight.

== Super middleweight ==
=== Primary champion lineage ===
No.	Name	Reign	Defenses
1	Park Chong-pal (def. Jesús Gallardo)	6 Dec 1987 – 23 May 1988	1
2	Fulgencio Obelmejias	23 May 1988 – 28 May 1989	0
3	Baek In-chul	28 May 1989 – 30 Mar 1990	2
4	Christophe Tiozzo	30 Mar 1990 – 5 Apr 1991	2
5	Víctor Córdoba	5 Apr 1991 – 12 Sep 1992	1
6	Michael Nunn	12 Sep 1992 – 26 Feb 1994	4
7	Steve Little	26 Feb – 12 Aug 1994	0
8	Frankie Liles	12 Aug 1994 – 12 Jun 1999	7
9	Byron Mitchell	12 Jun 1999 – 8 Apr 2000	1
10	Bruno Girard	8 Apr 2000 – Mar 2001	1
Girard vacated the title just days before his scheduled bout due to purse bid problems.
11	Byron Mitchell (2) (def. Manny Siaca)	3 Mar 2001 – 14 Mar 2003	2
Mitchell fought for the inaugural Unified title against Sven Ottke.
12	Sven Ottke – Unified champion (def. Byron Mitchell)	15 Mar 2003 – 27 Mar 2004	4
Ottke vacated the title and retired undefeated from professional boxing.
13	Anthony Mundine – Regular champion (Primary champion vacant)	27 Mar – 5 May 2004	0
14	Manny Siaca	5 May – 12 Nov 2004	0
15	Mikkel Kessler	12 Nov 2004 – 14 Oct 2006	3
15	Kessler fought for the Unified title against WBC champion Markus Beyer.		
15	Mikkel Kessler – Unified champion (def. Markus Beyer)	14 Oct 2006 – 4 Nov 2007	1 (4)
Kessler fought for the Undisputed title against WBO and The Ring champion Joe Calzaghe.
16	Joe Calzaghe – Undisputed champion (def. Mikkel Kessler)	4 Nov 2007 – 26 Sep 2008	0
Calzaghe vacated the title and moved up to light heavyweight.
17	Mikkel Kessler (2) – Regular champion (Primary champion vacant)	3 Oct 2008 – 21 Oct 2009	2
17	Kessler promoted to Super champion on WBA's August–September 2009 Official ratings posted on 21 October, 1 month before fighting Andre Ward.		
17	Mikkel Kessler (2) – Super champion (Regular champion promoted)	21 Oct – 21 Nov 2009	0 (2)
18	Andre Ward	21 Nov 2009 – 12 Nov 2015	5
Ward vacated the title to move up to light heavyweight.
19	Fedor Chudinov – Regular champion (Primary champion vacant)	12 Nov 2015 – 4 Jan 2016	0
19	Chudinov promoted to Super champion.		
19	Fedor Chudinov – Super champion (Regular champion promoted)	4 Jan – 20 Feb 2016	0
20	Felix Sturm	20 Feb – 5 Oct 2016	0
Sturm vacated the title citing impossibility to defend title after requiring surgery in both elbows.
21	Giovanni De Carolis – Regular champion (Primary champion vacant)	5 Oct – 5 Nov 2016	0
22	Tyron Zeuge	5 Nov 2016 – 27 May 2017	1
Zeuge relegated to secondary champion after George Groves and Fedor Chudinov fought for the vacant Super title.
23	George Groves – Super champion (def. Fedor Chudinov)	27 May 2017 – 28 Sep 2018	2
24	Callum Smith	28 Sep 2018 – 19 Dec 2020	2
25	Canelo Álvarez	19 Dec 2020 – 13 Sep 2025	8
26	Terence Crawford	13 Sep 2025 – 1 Jan 2026	0
Crawford announces his retirement. Interim champion Armando Reséndiz was later promoted to world champion.
27	Armando Reséndiz (interim champion promoted); (Primary champion vacant)	1 Jan – 2 May 2026	0
28	Jaime Munguia	2 May 2026 – present	1

=== Secondary champion lineage ===
No.	Name	Reign	Defenses
1	Anthony Mundine (def. Antwun Echols)	3 Sep 2003 – 27 Mar 2004	1
Moved to primary champion due to its vacancy.
2	Anthony Mundine (2) (def. Sam Soliman)	7 Mar 2007 – 27 May 2008	4
Title is vacated immediately after his final defense.
3	Mikkel Kessler (def. Dimitri Sartison)	21 Jun – 3 Oct 2008	0
Moved to primary champion due to its vacancy.
4	Dimitri Sartison (def. Stjepan Bozic)	21 Nov 2009 – 15 Jul 2011	1
Sartison was stripped of title after failing to fight in defense fights against Brian Magee and later Robert Stieglitz.
5	Károly Balzsay (def. Stanislav Kashtanov)	26 Aug 2011 – 3 Aug 2012	1
Balzsay was declared champion in recess in the July 2012 ratings posted on August 3.
6	Brian Magee (interim champion promoted)	9 Nov – 3 Dec 2012	0
7	Mikkel Kessler (2)	8 Dec 2012 – 25 May 2013	0
Kessler lost against IBF champion Carl Froch. Froch is declared as Unified champion.
8	Carl Froch – Unified champion (def. Mikkel Kessler)	25 May 2013 – 8 May 2015	2
Froch was stripped of title for inactivity.
9	Fedor Chudinov (def. Felix Sturm)	9 May – 12 Nov 2015	1
Moved to primary champion due to its vacancy.
10	Giovanni De Carolis (def. Vincent Feigenbutz)	9 Jan – 5 Oct 2016	1
Moved to primary champion due to its vacancy.
11	Tyron Zeuge (relegated from primary champion)	27 May 2017 – 14 Jul 2018	2 (3)
12	Rocky Fielding	14 Jul – 15 Dec 2018	0
13	Canelo Álvarez	15 Dec 2018 – 19 Dec 2020	0
Álvarez won against Super champion Callum Smith.
14	David Morrell (interim champion promoted)	19 Jan 2021 – 30 Aug 2024	6
Morell was granted a special permission to fight for the vacant WBA (Regular) light heavyweight title given that if he wins, he'll have to keep only one title. Morell then vacated the title and opted to stay at light heavyweight.

== Middleweight ==
=== Primary champion lineage ===
No.	Name	Reign	Defenses
1	Johnny Wilson (awarded inaugural title)	Jan 1921 – 31 Aug 1923	3
2	Harry Greb	31 Aug 1923 – 25 Feb 1926	4
3	Tiger Flowers	25 Feb – 3 Dec 1926	1
4	Mickey Walker	3 Dec 1926 – 19 Jun 1931	3
Walker vacated the title to move up to heavyweight.
5	Gorilla Jones (def. Oddone Piazza)	25 Jan – 11 Jun 1932	1
6	Marcel Thil	11 Jun 1932 – 19 Sep 1933	1
Thil was stripped during the annual NBA convention because he would not defend the title in the United States.
7	Lou Brouillard (awarded title)	19 Sep – 30 Oct 1933	0
8	Vince Dundee	30 Oct 1933 – 11 Sep 1934	2
9	Teddy Yarosz	11 Sep 1934 – 19 Sep 1935	0
10	Eddie Babe Risko	19 Sep 1935 – 11 Jul 1936	1
11	Freddie Steele	11 Jul 1936 – 26 Jul 1938	5
12	Al Hostak	26 Jul – 1 Nov 1938	0
13	Solly Krieger	1 Nov 1938 – 27 Jun 1939	0
14	Al Hostak (2)	27 Jun 1939 – 19 Jul 1940	1
15	Tony Zale	19 Jul 1940 – 16 Jul 1947	4
16	Rocky Graziano	16 Jul 1947 – 10 Jun 1948	4
17	Tony Zale (2)	10 Jun – 21 Sep 1948	0
18	Marcel Cerdan	21 Sep 1948 – 16 Jun 1949	0
19	Jake LaMotta	16 Jun 1949 – 14 Feb 1951	2
20	Sugar Ray Robinson	14 Feb – 10 Jul 1951	0
21	Randolph Turpin	10 Jul – 12 Sep 1951	0
22	Sugar Ray Robinson (2)	12 Sep 1951 – 19 Dec 1952	2
Robinson vacated the title and retired.
23	Bobo Olson (def. Randy Turpin)	21 Oct 1953 – 9 Dec 1955	3
24	Sugar Ray Robinson (3)	9 Dec 1955 – 2 Jan 1957	1
25	Gene Fullmer	2 Jan – 1 May 1957	0
26	Sugar Ray Robinson (4)	1 May – 23 Sep 1957	0
27	Carmen Basilio	23 Sep 1957 – 25 Mar 1958	0
28	Sugar Ray Robinson (5)	25 Mar 1958 – 4 May 1959	0
Robinson was stripped for failing to fight Carmen Basilio in a trilogy bout.
29	Gene Fullmer (2) (def. Carmen Basilio)	28 Aug 1959 – 23 Oct 1962	7
30	Dick Tiger	23 Oct 1962 – 7 Dec 1963	2
31	Joey Giardello	7 Dec 1963 – 21 Oct 1965	1
32	Dick Tiger (2)	21 Oct 1965 – 25 Apr 1966	0
33	Emile Griffith	25 Apr 1966 – 17 Apr 1967	2
34	Nino Benvenuti	17 Apr – 29 Sep 1967	0
35	Emile Griffith (2)	29 Sep 1967 – 4 Mar 1968	0
36	Nino Benvenuti (2)	4 Mar 1968 – 7 Nov 1970	4
37	Carlos Monzón	7 Nov 1970 – 29 Aug 1977	14
Monzón retires.
38	Rodrigo Valdéz (def. Bennie Briscoe)	5 Nov 1977 – 22 Apr 1978	0
39	Hugo Corro	22 Apr 1978 – 30 Jun 1979	2
40	Vito Antuofermo	30 Jun 1979 – 16 Mar 1980	1
41	Alan Minter	16 Mar – 27 Sep 1980	1
42	Marvin Hagler	27 Sep 1980 – 25 Feb 1987	11
Hagler was stripped of title for signing a fight with Sugar Ray Leonard instead of mandatory challenger, Herol Graham.
43	Sumbu Kalambay (def. Iran Barkley)	23 Oct 1987 – 2 Mar 1989	3
Kalambay was stripped of title for failing to defend his title against other top-ranked boxers.
44	Mike McCallum (def. Herol Graham)	10 May 1989 – 4 Dec 1991	3
The WBA demanded McCallum defend against Steve Collins, whom he decisively outpointed in a title defense the previous year. McCallum chose to fight with IBF champion James Toney and was stripped of title.
45	Reggie Johnson (def. Steve Collins)	22 Apr 1992 – 1 Oct 1993	3
46	John David Jackson	1 Oct 1993 – 6 May 1994	0
Jackson was stripped of title for participating in a non-title bout without the permission of the WBA.
47	Jorge Castro (def. Reggie Johnson)	12 Aug 1994 – 19 Dec 1995	4
48	Shinji Takehara	19 Dec 1995 – 24 Jun 1996	0
49	William Joppy	24 Jun 1996 – 23 Aug 1997	2
50	Julio César Green	23 Aug 1997 – 31 Jan 1998	0
51	William Joppy (2)	31 Jan 1998 – 12 May 2001	5
52	Félix Trinidad	12 May – 29 Sep 2001	0
Trinidad fought for the inaugural Super title against Bernard Hopkins.
53	Bernard Hopkins – Super champion (def. Félix Trinidad)	29 Sep 2001 – 5 Aug 2002	1
53	Status changed to Unified champion on WBA's July 2002 official ratings posted on 5 August.		
53	Bernard Hopkins – Unified champion	5 Aug 2002 – 26 Sep 2003	1 (2)
53	Status changed to Undisputed champion on WBA's June–July 2003 official ratings posted in September.		
53	Bernard Hopkins – Undisputed champion	26 Sep 2003 – 16 Jul 2005	4 (6)
54	Jermain Taylor	16 Jul 2005 – 14 Dec 2006	1
Taylor was stripped of title after not paying sanctioning fees to the WBA and thus not exposing the title in 2 of his previous fights against Winky Wright and Kassim Ouma.
55	Javier Castillejo – Regular champion (Primary champion vacant)	14 Dec 2006 – 28 Apr 2007	0
56	Felix Sturm	28 Apr 2007 – 24 Mar 2010	7
56	Sturm is promoted to Super champion on WBA's February 2010 ratings posted on 24 March.		
56	Felix Sturm – Super champion (Regular champion promoted)	24 Mar 2010 – 1 Sep 2012	5 (12)
57	Daniel Geale	1 Sep – 2 Nov 2012	0
Geale was stripped of title as he chose to fight Anthony Mundine instead of mandatory challenger Gennady Golovkin.
58	Gennady Golovkin – Regular champion (Primary champion vacant)	2 Nov 2012 – 3 Jun 2014	5
58	Golovkin promoted to Super champion.		
58	Gennady Golovkin – Super champion (Regular champion promoted)	3 Jun 2014 – 15 Sept 2018	9 (14)
59	Canelo Álvarez	15 Sep 2018 – 1 Jan 2021	1
Álvarez vacates the title to stay at super middleweight.
60	Ryōta Murata – Regular champion (Primary champion vacant)	1 Jan – 6 Jan 2021	0
60	Murata promoted to Super champion.		
60	Ryōta Murata – Super champion (Regular champion promoted)	6 Jan 2021 – 9 Apr 2022	0
61	Gennady Golovkin (2)	9 Apr 2022 – 9 Mar 2023	0
Golovkin vacated the title.
62	Erislandy Lara – Regular champion (Primary champion vacant)	9 Mar 2023 – present	3

=== Secondary champion lineage ===
No.	Name	Reign	Defenses
1	William Joppy (def. Howard Eastman)	17 Nov 2001 – 13 Dec 2003	1
Joppy lost against Super champion Bernard Hopkins.
2	Maselino Masoe (def. Evans Ashira)	1 May 2004 – 11 Mar 2006	0
3	Felix Sturm	11 Mar – 15 Jul 2006	0
4	Javier Castillejo	15 Jul – 14 Dec 2006	1
Castillejo lost his defense fight against Mariano Carrera but Carrera tested positive for clenbuterol later. Castillejo was reinstated as champion and fight was counted as a mandatory defense. Moved to primary champion due to its vacancy.
5	Gennady Golovkin (interim champion promoted)	14 Oct 2010 – 2 Nov 2012	5
Moved to primary champion due to its vacancy.
6	Daniel Jacobs (def. Jarrod Fletcher)	9 Aug 2014 – 18 Mar 2017	4
Jacobs lost against Super champion Gennady Golovkin.
7	Hassan N'Dam N'Jikam (def. Ryōta Murata)	20 May – 22 Oct 2017	0
8	Ryōta Murata	22 Oct 2017 – 20 Oct 2018	1
9	Rob Brant	20 Oct 2018 – 12 Jul 2019	1
10	Ryōta Murata (2)	12 Jul 2019 – 1 Jan 2021	1
Moved to primary champion due to its vacancy.
11	Erislandy Lara (def. Thomas LaManna)	1 May 2021 – 9 Mar 2023	1
Moved to primary champion due to its vacancy.

== Super welterweight ==
=== Primary champion lineage ===
No.	Name	Reign	Defenses
1	Denny Moyer (def. Joey Giambra)	20 Oct 1962 – 29 Apr 1963	1
2	Ralph Dupas	29 Apr – 7 Sep 1963	1
3	Alessandro Mazzinghi	7 Sep 1963 – 18 Jun 1965	3
4	Nino Benvenuti	18 Jun 1965 – 25 Jun 1966	1
5	Kim Ki-soo	25 Jun 1966 – 25 May 1968	2
6	Sandro Mazzinghi (2)	25 May – 28 Oct 1968	1
Mazzinghi fought on his second defense against Freddie Little. The bout was stopped with Mazzinghi bleeding from cuts over both eyes, the ringside officials rule a No contest, though under normal circumstances Little would have won by TKO. Mazzinghi was stripped of his world title shortly thereafter, because of the controversial result.
7	Freddie Little (def. Stanley Hayward)	17 Mar 1969 – 9 Jul 1970	2
8	Carmelo Bossi	9 Jul 1970 – 31 Oct 1971	1
9	Koichi Wajima	31 Oct 1971 – 4 Jun 1974	6
10	Oscar Albarado	4 Jun 1974 – 21 Jan 1975	1
11	Koichi Wajima (2)	21 Jan – 7 Jun 1975	0
12	Yuh Jae-doo	7 Jun 1975 – 17 Feb 1976	1
13	Koichi Wajima (3)	17 Feb – 18 May 1976	0
14	José Duran	18 May – 8 Oct 1976	0
15	Miguel Ángel Castellini	8 Oct 1976 – 5 Mar 1977	0
16	Eddie Gazo	5 Mar 1977 – 9 Aug 1978	3
17	Masashi Kudo	9 Aug 1978 – 24 Aug 1979	3
18	Ayub Kalule	24 Aug 1979 – 25 Jun 1981	4
19	Sugar Ray Leonard	25 Jun – 23 Sep 1981	0
Leonard vacated the title and moved down to welterweight to fight in a unification bout against Thomas Hearns.
20	Tadashi Mihara (def. Rocky Fratto)	7 Nov 1981 – 2 Feb 1982	0
21	Davey Moore	2 Feb 1982 – 16 Jun 1983	3
22	Roberto Durán	16 Jun 1983 – 15 Jun 1984	0
Durán intends to vacate the WBA title before fighting Thomas Hearns. The title was officially vacated when he stepped on the ring against Hearns.
23	Mike McCallum (def. Sean Mannion)	19 Oct 1984 – Aug 1987	6
McCallum vacated the title to move up to middleweight.
24	Julian Jackson (def. Baek In-Chul)	21 Nov 1987 – 10 Jan 1991	3
Jackson's title was vacated the title on WBA's December 1990 ratings posted on 10 January.
25	Gilbert Delé (def. Carlos Elliott)	23 Feb – 1 Oct 1991	1
26	Vinny Paz	1 Oct 1991 – 14 Oct 1992	0
Pazienza vacated the title because of excessive purse demands by no 1. contender Julio César Vásquez.
27	Julio César Vásquez (def. Hitoshi Kamiyama)	21 Dec 1992 – 4 Mar 1995	10
28	Pernell Whitaker	4 Mar – 8 Mar 1995	0
Whitaker vacated the title and moved back to welterweight.
29	Carl Daniels (def. Julio César Green)	16 Jun – 16 Dec 1995	0
30	Julio César Vásquez (2)	16 Dec 1995 – 21 Aug 1996	0
31	Laurent Boudouani	21 Aug 1996 – 6 Mar 1999	4
32	David Reid	6 Mar 1999 – 3 Mar 2000	2
33	Félix Trinidad	3 Mar 2000 – 29 May 2001	2
Trinidad vacated the title to stay at middleweight.
34	Fernando Vargas (def. José Flores)	22 Sep 2001 – 14 Sep 2002	0
Vargas fought for the inaugural Unified title against WBC champion Oscar De La Hoya.
35	Oscar De La Hoya – Unified champion (def. Fernando Vargas)	14 Sep 2002 – 13 Sep 2003	1
36	Shane Mosley	13 Sep 2003 – 13 Mar 2004	0
37	Winky Wright	13 Mar 2004 – 20 Mar 2005	1
Winky Wright challenged Félix Trinidad at middleweight. Title is vacated on WBA's February 2005 ratings posted on 20 March.
38	Travis Simms – Regular champion (Primary champion vacant)	20 Mar – 5 June 2005	0
Simms' title was vacated on WBA's May 2005 ratings posted on 5 June.
39	Alejandro García (interim champion promoted); (Primary champion vacant)	18 Jul 2005 – 6 May 2006	1
40	José Antonio Rivera	6 May 2006 – 6 Jan 2007	0
41	Travis Simms (2)	6 Jan – 7 Jul 2007	0
42	Joachim Alcine	7 Jul 2007 – 11 Jul 2008	1
43	Daniel Santos	11 Jul 2008 – 14 Nov 2009	0
44	Yuri Foreman	14 Nov 2009 – 5 Jun 2010	0
45	Miguel Cotto	5 Jun – 15 Oct 2010	0
45	Cotto is promoted to Super champion on WBA's September 2010 official ratings posted on 15 October.		
45	Miguel Cotto – Super champion (Regular champion promoted)	15 Oct 2010 – 5 May 2012	2
46	Floyd Mayweather Jr.	5 May 2012 – 19 Jan 2016	1
Mayweather retires following his fight with Andre Berto on 14 September 2015. However, he was officially stripped on the December 2015 rankings posted on 19 January 2016. The reason for the delay was because "it's a matter of formality".
47	Erislandy Lara – Regular champion (Primary champion vacant)	19 Jan – 8 Jun 2016	1
47	Lara is promoted to Super champion on WBA's May 2016 ratings posted on 8 June.		
47	Erislandy Lara – Super champion (Regular champion promoted)	8 Jun 2016 – 7 Apr 2018	2 (3)
48	Jarrett Hurd	7 Apr 2018 – 11 May 2019	1
49	Julian Williams	11 May 2019 – 18 Jan 2020	0
50	Jeison Rosario	18 Jan – 26 Sep 2020	0
51	Jermell Charlo	26 Sep 2020 – 5 Mar 2024	2
Charlo was reportedly designated as champion in recess by the WBA. WBA then officially announced the designation on March 5th.
52	Israil Madrimov (def. Magomed Kurbanov); (Primary champion vacant)	8 Mar – 3 Aug 2024	0
53	Terence Crawford	3 Aug 2024 – 13 Sep 2025	0
Crawford was stripped of the title for moving up and opting to challenge the undisputed super middleweight titles against Canelo Álvarez.
54	Abass Baraou (interim champion promoted); (Primary champion vacant)	13 Sep 2025 – 31 Jan 2026	0
55	Xander Zayas	31 Jan – 27 Jun 2026	0
56	Jaron Ennis	27 Jun 2026 – present	0

=== Secondary champion lineage ===
No.	Name	Reign	Defenses
1	Santiago Samaniego (interim champion promoted)	14 Sep 2002 – 1 Mar 2003	0
2	Alejandro García	1 Mar – 13 Dec 2003	1
3	Travis Simms	13 Dec 2003 – 20 Mar 2005	1
Moved to primary champion due to its vacancy.
4	Austin Trout (def. Rigoberto Álvarez)	5 Feb 2011 – 20 Apr 2013	4
Trout fought WBC champion Canelo Álvarez for the Unified title.
5	Canelo Álvarez – Unified champion (def. Austin Trout)	20 Apr – 14 Sep 2013	0
Álvarez lost against Super champion Floyd Mayweather Jr.
6	Erislandy Lara (interim champion promoted)	13 Mar 2014 – 19 Jan 2016	3
Moved to primary champion due to its vacancy.
7	Jack Culcay (interim champion promoted)	8 Jun 2016 – 11 Mar 2017	0
8	Demetrius Andrade	11 Mar – 22 Oct 2017	0
Andrade vacates the title to move up to middleweight.
9	Brian Castaño (interim champion promoted)	22 Oct 2017 – 20 Jun 2019	2
Castaño vacates the title after not agreeing on terms to fight mandatory fighter Michel Soro.
10	Erislandy Lara (2) (def. Ramón Álvarez)	31 Aug 2019 – 31 Aug 2021	1
Lara vacates the title to stay at middleweight.

== Welterweight ==
=== Primary champion lineage ===
No.	Name	Reign	Defenses
1	Jack Britton (awarded inaugural title)	Jan 1921 – 1 Nov 1922	4
2	Mickey Walker	1 Nov 1922 – 20 May 1926	3
3	Pete Latzo	20 May 1926 – 3 Jun 1927	2
4	Joe Dundee	3 Jun 1927 – 22 Mar 1929	2
Dundee is stripped of the title when he failed to sign for a title bout contender.
5	Jackie Fields (def. Jack Thompson)	25 Mar 1929 – 9 May 1930	1
6	Jack Thompson	9 May – 5 Sep 1930	0
7	Tommy Freeman	5 Sep 1930 – 14 Apr 1931	0
8	Jack Thompson (2)	14 Apr – 23 Oct 1931	0
9	Lou Brouillard	23 Oct 1931 – 28 Jan 1932	0
10	Jackie Fields (2)	28 Jan 1932 – 22 Feb 1933	0
11	Young Corbett III	22 Feb – 29 May 1933	0
12	Jimmy McLarnin	29 May 1933 – 28 May 1934	0
13	Barney Ross	28 May – 17 Sep 1934	0
14	Jimmy McLarnin (2)	17 Sep 1934 – 28 May 1935	0
15	Barney Ross (2)	28 May 1935 – 31 May 1938	2
16	Henry Armstrong	31 May 1938 – 4 Oct 1940	19
17	Fritzie Zivic	4 Oct 1940 – 29 Jul 1941	1
18	Freddie Cochrane	29 Jul 1941 – 1 Feb 1946	0
19	Marty Servo	1 Feb – 25 Sep 1946	0
Servo retires.
20	Sugar Ray Robinson (def. Tommy Bell)	20 Dec 1946 – 15 Feb 1951	4
Robinson's title is automatically vacated after winning the middleweight title.
21	Johnny Bratton (def. Charley Fusari)	13 Mar – 18 May 1951	0
22	Kid Gavilán	18 May 1951 – 20 Oct 1954	7
23	Johnny Saxton	20 Oct 1954 – 1 Apr 1955	0
24	Tony DeMarco	1 Apr – 10 Jun 1955	0
25	Carmen Basilio	10 Jun 1955 – 14 Mar 1956	0
26	Johnny Saxton (2)	14 Mar – 12 Sep 1956	0
27	Carmen Basilio (2)	12 Sep 1956 – 23 Sep 1957	1
Basilio vacated the title after winning the middleweight title.
28	Virgil Akins (def. Vince Martinez)	6 Jun – 5 Dec 1958	0
29	Don Jordan	5 Dec 1958 – 27 May 1960	2
30	Benny Paret	27 May 1960 – 1 Apr 1961	1
31	Emile Griffith	1 Apr – 30 Sep 1961	1
32	Benny Paret (2)	30 Sep 1961 – 24 Mar 1962	0
33	Emile Griffith (2)	24 Mar 1962 – 21 Mar 1963	2
34	Luis Manuel Rodríguez	21 Mar – 8 Jun 1963	0
35	Emile Griffith (3)	8 Jun 1963 – 10 Jun 1966	5
Griffith was stripped of the title for failing to defend it within the required 6 months.
36	Curtis Cokes (def. Manuel González)	24 Aug 1966 – 18 Apr 1969	5
37	José Nápoles	18 Apr 1969 – 3 Dec 1970	3
38	Billy Backus	3 Dec 1970 – 4 Jun 1971	0
39	José Nápoles (2)	4 Jun 1971 – 16 May 1975	9
Nápoles was stripped of his WBA title for failure to sign for a fight against the WBA's No. 1-rated welterweight contender, Ángel Espada.
40	Ángel Espada (def. Clyde Gray)	28 Jun 1975 – 17 Jul 1976	1
41	José Cuevas	17 Jul 1976 – 2 Aug 1980	11
42	Thomas Hearns	2 Aug 1980 – 16 Sep 1981	3
43	Sugar Ray Leonard	16 Sep 1981 – 9 Nov 1982	1
Leonard vacated the title due to a detached retina and retired.
44	Donald Curry (def. Hwang Jun-Suk)	13 Feb 1983 – 27 Sep 1986	7
45	Lloyd Honeyghan	27 Sep 1986 – 5 Jan 1987	0
Honeyghan vacated the title after the WBA mandated that he defend the title against South African Harold Volbrecht. Honeyghan dropped the WBA title belt into a trash can on a London street to protest the WBA's continued sanctioning of bouts involving citizens of apartheid-governed South Africa.
46	Mark Breland (def. Harold Volbrecht)	6 Feb – 22 Aug 1987	0
47	Marlon Starling	22 Aug 1987 – 29 Jul 1988 (Note: Starling lost the title in his third defense in controversial fashion to Tomas Molinares. Molinares hit Starling with a punch that was after the bell, and the referee counted him out. Molinares was declared the new champion by knockout however, the decision was later changed to a no contest but Molinares kept the title.)	2
48	Tomás Molinares	29 Jul – 12 Dec 1988	0
Molinares withdrew from his defense fight with Mark Breland and vacated the title due to troubles on keeping his weight down.
49	Mark Breland (2) (def. Lee Seung-Soon)	4 Feb 1989 – 8 Jul 1990	4
50	Aaron Davis	8 Jul 1990 – 19 Jan 1991	0
51	Meldrick Taylor	19 Jan 1991 – 31 Oct 1992	2
52	Crisanto España	31 Oct 1992 – 4 Jun 1994	2
53	Ike Quartey	4 Jun 1994 – 19 Aug 1998	7
Quartey was stripped of the title for pulling out on his defense against Andrey Pestryayev.
54	James Page (def. Andrey Pestryayev)	10 Oct 1998 – 27 Sep 2000	3
Page was stripped of title for failing to fight his mandatory challenger Andrew Lewis.
55	Andrew Lewis (def. James Page)	17 Feb 2001 – 30 Mar 2002	1
56	Ricardo Mayorga	30 Mar 2002 – 25 Jan 2003	0
56	Mayorga fought for the inaugural Unified title against WBC and The Ring champion Vernon Forrest.		
56	Ricardo Mayorga – Unified champion (def. Vernon Forrest)	25 Jan – 13 Dec 2003	2
Mayorga fought for the Undisputed title against IBF champion Cory Spinks.
57	Cory Spinks – Undisputed champion (def. Ricardo Mayorga)	13 Dec 2003 – 5 Feb 2005	2
58	Zab Judah	5 Feb 2005 – 7 Jan 2006	1
Judah fought with Carlos Baldomir for the WBC belt as the latter did not pay the sanctioning fee for the WBA and IBF belt. Judah lost the bout and the WBA subsequently stripped him of the title.
59	Luis Collazo – Regular champion (Primary champion vacant)	7 Jan – 13 May 2006	0
60	Ricky Hatton	13 May – 31 Aug 2006	0
Hatton vacated the title to move back to super lightweight.
61	Miguel Cotto (def. Carlos Quintana); (Primary champion vacant)	2 Dec 2006 – 26 Jul 2008	4
62	Antonio Margarito	26 Jul – 3 Oct 2008	0
62	Margarito promoted to Super champion.		
62	Antonio Margarito – Super champion (Regular champion promoted)	3 Oct 2008 – 24 Jan 2009	0
63	Shane Mosley	24 Jan 2009 – 21 May 2010	0
Mosley was stripped of the title for disagreeing on the terms for his bout with Floyd Mayweather Jr., who refused to pay the sanctioning fees for the title and Mosley fought without reaching a deal with the WBA.
64	Vyacheslav Senchenko – Regular champion (Primary champion vacant)	21 May 2010 – 30 Apr 2012	2
65	Paulie Malignaggi	30 Apr 2012 – 22 Jun 2013	1
66	Adrien Broner	22 Jun – 14 Dec 2013	0
67	Marcos Maidana	14 Dec 2013 – 3 May 2014	0
Maidana fought for Unified title against WBC and The Ring champion Floyd Mayweather Jr.
68	Floyd Mayweather Jr. – Unified champion (def. Marcos Maidana)	3 May 2014 – 19 Jan 2016	3
Mayweather retires following his fight with Andre Berto on 14 September 2015. However, he was officially stripped on the December 2015 rankings posted on 19 January 2016. The reason for the delay was because "it's a matter of formality".
69	Keith Thurman – Regular champion (Primary champion vacant)	19 Jan 2016 – 7 Feb 2017	1
69	Keith Thurman promoted to Super champion on WBA's January 2017 ratings posted on 7 February, 1 month before fighting WBC champion Danny Garcia.		
69	Keith Thurman – Super champion (Regular champion promoted)	7 Feb 2017 – 20 Jul 2019	2 (3)
70	Manny Pacquiao	20 Jul 2019 – 29 Jan 2021	0
Pacquiao was stripped of his title and declared champion in recess due to inactivity.
71	Yordenis Ugás – Super champion (Regular champion promoted)	29 Jan 2021 – 16 Apr 2022	1
72	Errol Spence Jr.	16 Apr 2022 – 29 Jul 2023	0
73	Terence Crawford	29 Jul 2023 – 30 Aug 2024	0
Crawford vacated the title to stay at super welterweight.
74	Eimantas Stanionis – Regular champion (Primary champion vacant)	30 Aug 2024 – 12 Apr 2025	0
75	Jaron Ennis	12 Apr – 22 Apr 2025	0
75	Ennis promoted to Super champion.		
75	Jaron Ennis – Super champion (Regular champion promoted)	22 Apr – 1 Aug 2025	0
Ennis expressed his intention to move up to super welterweight. WBA vacated his title on their July 2025 rankings released on 1 Aug.
76	Rolando Romero – Regular champion (Primary champion vacant)	1 Aug 2025 – 21 May 2026	0
76	Romero promoted to Super champion.		
76	Rolando Romero – Super champion (Regular champion promoted)	21 May – 22 Aug 2026	0
77	Teofimo Lopez	22 Aug 2026 – present	0

=== Secondary champion lineage ===
No.	Name	Reign	Defenses
1	José Antonio Rivera (def. Michel Trabant)	13 Sep 2003 – 2 Apr 2005	0
2	Luis Collazo	2 Apr 2005 – 7 Jan 2006	1
Moved to primary champion due to its vacancy.
3	Yuriy Nuzhnenko (interim champion promoted)	3 Oct 2008 – 10 Apr 2009	0
4	Vyacheslav Senchenko	10 Apr 2009 – 21 May 2010	1
Moved to primary champion due to its vacancy.
5	Keith Thurman (interim champion promoted)	28 Jan 2015 – 19 Jan 2016	2
Moved to primary champion due to its vacancy.
6	David Avanesyan (interim champion promoted)	7 Feb – 18 Feb 2017	0
7	Lamont Peterson	18 Feb – 3 Oct 2017	0
Peterson vacated the title to leave space for other contenders in the ranking.
8	Lucas Matthysse (def. Tewa Kiram)	27 Jan – 15 Jul 2018	0
9	Manny Pacquiao	15 Jul 2018 – 20 Jul 2019	1
Pacquiao won against Super champion Keith Thurman.
10	Yordenis Ugás (def. Abel Ramos)	6 Sep 2020 – 29 Jan 2021	0
Ugas promoted to Super champion after Pacquiao was stripped due to inactivity.
11	Jamal James (interim champion promoted)	4 Feb – 30 Oct 2021	0
12	Radzhab Butaev	30 Oct 2021 – 16 Apr 2022	0
13	Eimantas Stanionis	16 Apr 2022 – 30 Aug 2024	1
Moved to primary champion due to its vacancy.
14	Rolando Romero (def. Ryan Garcia)	2 May – 1 Aug 2025	0
Moved to primary champion due to its vacancy.
15	Jack Catterall (def. Shakhram Giyasov)	23 May 2026 – present	0

== Super lightweight ==
=== Primary champion lineage ===
No.	Name	Reign	Defenses
1	Pinky Mitchell (awarded inaugural title)	22 Nov 1922 – 21 Sep 1926	0
2	Mushy Callahan	21 Sep 1926 – 18 Feb 1930	3
3	Jack Kid Berg	18 Feb 1930 – 24 Apr 1931	6
4	Tony Canzoneri	24 Apr 1931 – 18 Jan 1932	3
5	Johnny Jadick	18 Jan – 20 Sep 1932	1
On 20 September 1932, the NBA decided not to recognize the division.
6	Tippy Larkin (def. Willie Joyce)	29 Apr – 5 Nov 1946	1
Larkin vacates title to move up to welterweight.
7	Carlos Ortiz (def. Kenny Lane)	12 Jun 1959 – 1 Sep 1960	2
8	Duilio Loi	1 Sep 1960 – 14 Sep 1962	2
9	Eddie Perkins	14 Sep – 15 Dec 1962	0
10	Duilio Loi (2)	15 Dec 1962 – 24 Jan 1963	0
Loi vacated the title and retired from boxing.
11	Roberto Cruz (def. Battling Torres)	21 Mar – 15 Jun 1963	0
12	Eddie Perkins (2)	15 Jun 1963 – 18 Jan 1965	2
13	Carlos Hernández	18 Jan 1965 – 29 Apr 1966	2
14	Sandro Lopopolo	29 Apr 1966 – 30 Apr 1967	1
15	Takeshi Fuji	30 Apr 1967 – 12 Dec 1968	1
16	Nicolino Locche	12 Dec 1968 – 10 Mar 1972	5
17	Alfonso Frazer	10 Mar – 28 Oct 1972	0
18	Antonio Cervantes	28 Oct 1972 – 6 Mar 1976	10
19	Wilfred Benítez	6 Mar – 28 Nov 1976	2
Benítez was stripped of the title for cancelling many scheduled title defenses following an automobile accident.
20	Antonio Cervantes (2) (def. Carlos María Giménez)	25 Jun 1977 – 2 Aug 1980	6
21	Aaron Pryor	2 Aug 1980 – 26 Oct 1983	8
Pryor vacated the title after retiring.
22	Johnny Bumphus (def. Lorenzo Luis García)	22 Jan – 1 Jun 1984	0
23	Gene Hatcher	1 Jun 1984 – 21 Jul 1985	1
24	Ubaldo Néstor Sacco	21 Jul 1985 – 15 Mar 1986	0
25	Patrizio Oliva	15 Mar 1986 – 4 Jul 1987	2
26	Juan Martin Coggi	4 Jul 1987 – 17 Aug 1990	4
27	Loreto Garza	17 Aug 1990 – 14 Jun 1991	1
28	Edwin Rosario	14 Jun 1991 – 10 Apr 1992	0
29	Akinobu Hiranaka	10 Apr – 9 Sep 1992	0
30	Morris East	9 Sep 1992 – 12 Jan 1993	0
31	Juan Martin Coggi (2)	12 Jan 1993 – 17 Sep 1994	6
32	Frankie Randall	17 Sep 1994 – 13 Jan 1996	2
33	Juan Martin Coggi (3)	13 Jan – 16 Aug 1996	0
34	Frankie Randall (2)	16 Aug 1996 – 11 Jan 1997	0
35	Khalid Rahilou	11 Jan 1997 – 10 Oct 1998	2
36	Sharmba Mitchell	10 Oct 1998 – 3 Feb 2001	4
Mitchell fought for inaugural Super title against Kostya Tszyu.
37	Kostya Tszyu – Super champion (def. Sharmba Mitchell)	3 Feb 2001 – 5 Aug 2002	3
37	Status changes to Unified champion on WBA's July 2002 ratings posted on 5 August.		
37	Kostya Tszyu – Unified champion	5 Aug 2002	1 (4)
37	Status changed to Undisputed champion on WBA's May–June 2003 ranking.		
37	Kostya Tszyu – Undisputed champion	Jul 2003 – 16 Jun 2004	0 (4)
Tszyu was stripped of title due to inactivity.
38	Vivian Harris – Regular champion (Primary champion vacant)	16 Jun 2004 – 25 Jun 2005	1
39	Carlos Maussa	25 Jun – 26 Nov 2005	0
Fought for Unified title against IBF and The Ring champion Ricky Hatton.
40	Ricky Hatton – Unified champion (def. Carlos Maussa)	26 Nov 2005 – 4 May 2006	0
Hatton vacated the title to move up to welterweight.
41	Souleymane M'baye (def. Raúl Horacio Balbi); (Primary champion vacant)	2 Sep 2006 – 21 Jul 2007	1
42	Gavin Rees	21 Jul 2007 – 22 Mar 2008	0
43	Andreas Kotelnik	22 Mar 2008 – 18 Jul 2009	2
44	Amir Khan	18 Jul 2009 – 23 Jul 2011	4
44	Khan fought for Super title against Zab Judah.		
44	Amir Khan – Super champion (def. Zab Judah)	23 Jul – 10 Dec 2011	1 (5)
45	Lamont Peterson	10 Dec 2011 – 11 Jul 2012	0
WBA and IBF champion Peterson tested positive for synthetic testosterone on a random test in May 2012. He was only stripped of his WBA title.
46	Amir Khan (2) – Super champion (reinstated)	11 Jul – 14 Jul 2012	0
47	Danny Garcia	14 Jul 2012 – 11 Sep 2015	4
Garcia moves up to welterweight and the title is vacated on WBA's August 2015 official ratings posted on 11 September.
48	Adrien Broner (def. Khabib Allakhverdiev); (Primary champion vacant)	3 Oct – 6 Nov 2015	0
48	Broner is promoted to Super champion.		
48	Adrien Broner – Super champion (Regular champion promoted)	6 Nov 2015 – 1 Apr 2016	0
Broner stripped of title before his defense against Ashley Theophane for being overweight.
49	Ricky Burns (def. Michele Di Rocco); (Primary champion vacant)	28 May 2016 – 15 Apr 2017	1
Burns fought for Unified title against IBF champion Julius Indongo.
50	Julius Indongo – Unified champion (def. Ricky Burns)	15 Apr – 19 Aug 2017	0
Indongo fought for Super title against WBC, WBO, and The Ring champion Terence Crawford.
51	Terence Crawford – Super champion (def. Julius Indongo)	19 Aug – 28 Oct 2017	0
The title is vacated on WBA's October rankings after Crawford expressed his intentions of moving up to welterweight.
52	Kiryl Relikh (def. Rances Barthelemy); (Primary champion vacant)	10 Mar 2018 – 27 Apr 2019	1
53	Regis Prograis	27 Apr – 26 Oct 2019	0
Prograis fought for Super title against IBF champion Josh Taylor.
54	Josh Taylor – Super champion (def. Regis Prograis)	26 Oct 2019 – 14 May 2022	3
Taylor was stripped of the title after he failed to sign the contract in an ordered bout against his mandatory challenger, Alberto Puello.
55	Alberto Puello (def. Batyr Akhmedov); (Primary champion vacant)	20 Aug 2022 – 10 May 2023	0
Puello was made champion in recess after testing positive for banned substance before his defense against Rolando Romero.
56	Rolando Romero (def. Ismael Barroso); (Primary champion vacant)	13 May 2023 – 30 Mar 2024	0
57	Isaac Cruz	30 Mar – 3 Aug 2024	0
58	José Valenzuela	3 Aug 2024 – 1 Mar 2025	0
59	Gary Antuanne Russell	1 Mar 2025 – present	1

=== Secondary champion lineage ===
No.	Name	Reign	Defenses
1	Diosbelys Hurtado (def. Randall Bailey)	11 May – 19 Oct 2002	0
2	Vivian Harris	19 Oct 2002 – 16 Jun 2004	2
Moved to primary champion due to its vacancy.
3	Marcos Maidana (interim champion promoted)	23 Jul 2011 – 16 Jul 2012	1
Maidana vacated the title to move up to welterweight and fight Devon Alexander.
4	Khabib Allakhverdiev (def. Joan Guzmán)	30 Nov 2012 – 12 Apr 2014	1
5	Jessie Vargas	12 Apr 2014 – 27 Jun 2015	2
Vargas vacated the title before challenging WBO welterweight champion Timothy Bradley to avoid paying WBA's sanctioning fees.
6	Mario Barrios (def. Batyr Akhmedov)	28 Sep 2019 – 26 Jun 2021	1
7	Gervonta Davis	26 Jun – 7 Dec 2021	0
Davis vacated the title to stay at lightweight.

== Lightweight ==
=== Primary champion lineage ===
No.	Name	Reign	Defenses
1	Benny Leonard (awarded inaugural title)	Jan 1921 – 15 Jan 1925	7
Leonard retires.
2	Jimmy Goodrich (def. Stanislaus Loayza)	13 Jul – 7 Dec 1925	0
3	Rocky Kansas	7 Dec 1925 – 3 Jul 1926	0
4	Sammy Mandell	3 Jul 1926 – 17 Jul 1930	5
5	Al Singer	17 Jul – 14 Nov 1930	0
6	Tony Canzoneri	14 Nov 1930 – 23 Jun 1933	4
7	Barney Ross	23 Jun 1933 – 15 Apr 1935	1
Ross vacated the title to move up to super lightweight.
8	Tony Canzoneri (2) (def. Lou Ambers)	10 May 1935 – 3 Sep 1936	1
9	Lou Ambers	3 Sep 1936 – 17 Aug 1938	2
10	Henry Armstrong	17 Aug 1938 – 22 Aug 1939	1
11	Lou Ambers (2)	22 Aug 1939 – 25 Mar 1940	0
Ambers was stripped after failing to defend the title within 6 months and refusing to fight the top contender Davey Day.
12	Sammy Angott (def. Davey Day)	3 May 1940 – 14 Nov 1942	1
Angott temporarily retires.
13	Sammy Angott (2) (def. Slugger White)	27 Oct 1943 – 8 Mar 1944	0
14	Juan Zurita	8 Mar 1944 – 18 Apr 1945	0
15	Ike Williams	18 Apr 1945 – 25 May 1951	8
16	Jimmy Carter	25 May 1951 – 14 May 1952	2
17	Lauro Salas	14 May – 15 Oct 1952	0
18	Jimmy Carter (2)	15 Oct 1952 – 5 Mar 1954	3
19	Paddy DeMarco	5 Mar – 17 Nov 1954	0
20	Jimmy Carter (3)	17 Nov 1954 – 29 Jun 1955	0
21	Wallace Bud Smith	29 Jun 1955 – 24 Aug 1956	1
22	Joe Brown	24 Aug 1956 – 21 Apr 1962	11
23	Carlos Ortiz	21 Apr 1962 – 10 Apr 1965	4
24	Ismael Laguna	10 Apr – 13 Nov 1965	0
25	Carlos Ortiz (2)	13 Nov 1965 – 29 Jun 1968	5
26	Carlos Cruz	29 Jun 1968 – 18 Feb 1969	1
27	Mando Ramos	18 Feb 1969 – 3 Mar 1970	1
28	Ismael Laguna (2)	3 Mar – 26 Sep 1970	1
29	Ken Buchanan	26 Sep 1970 – 26 Jun 1972	2
30	Roberto Durán	26 Jun 1972 – 2 Feb 1979	12
Durán vacated the title to move up to welterweight.
31	Ernesto España (def. Claude Noel)	16 Jun 1979 – 2 Mar 1980	1
32	Hilmer Kenty	2 Mar 1980 – 12 Apr 1981	3
33	Sean O'Grady	12 Apr – 14 Aug 1981	0
O'Grady was stripped of title for not defending it.
34	Claude Noel (def. Rodolfo González)	12 Sep – 5 Dec 1981	0
35	Arturo Frias	5 Dec 1981 – 8 May 1982	1
36	Ray Mancini	8 May 1982 – 1 Jun 1984	4
37	Livingstone Bramble	1 Jun 1984 – 26 Sep 1986	2
38	Edwin Rosario	26 Sep 1986 – 21 Nov 1987	1
39	Julio César Chávez	21 Nov 1987 – 1 Jun 1989	2
Chávez vacated the title to move up to super lightweight. The title was declared vacant when a bout between Edwin Rosario and Anthony Jones was scheduled.
40	Edwin Rosario (2) (def. Anthony Jones)	9 Jul 1989 – 4 Apr 1990	0
41	Juan Nazario	4 Apr – 11 Aug 1990	0
42	Pernell Whitaker	11 Aug 1990 – 20 Apr 1992	3
Whitaker vacated the title to move up to super lightweight.
43	Joey Gamache (def. Chil-Sung Jun)	13 Jun – 24 Oct 1992	0
44	Tony Lopez	24 Oct 1992 – 26 Jun 1993	1
45	Dingaan Thobela	26 Jun – 30 Oct 1993	0
46	Orzubek Nazarov	30 Oct 1993 – 16 May 1998	6
47	Jean Baptiste Mendy	16 May 1998 – 10 Apr 1999	1
48	Julien Lorcy	10 Apr – 7 Aug 1999	0
49	Stefano Zoff	7 Aug – 13 Nov 1999	0
50	Gilberto Serrano	13 Nov 1999 – 11 Jun 2000	1
51	Takanori Hatakeyama	11 Jun 2000 – 1 Jul 2001	2
52	Julien Lorcy (2)	1 Jul – 18 Oct 2001	0
53	Raúl Horacio Balbi	18 Oct 2001 – 5 Jan 2002	0
54	Leonard Doroftei	5 Jan 2002 – 24 Oct 2003	2
Doroftei was stripped of title when he came 4.4 lbs overweight to his bout with Miguel Callist. The fight was cancelled.
55	Lakva Sim (def. Miguel Callist)	10 Apr – 17 Jul 2004	0
56	Juan Díaz	17 Jul 2004 – 23 Feb 2007	5
56	Diaz became Unified champion after beating WBO champion Acelino Freitas.		
56	Juan Díaz – Unified champion (def. Acelino Freitas)	23 Feb – 13 Oct 2007	1 (6)
56	Diaz became Undisputed champion after beating IBF champion Julio Díaz.		
56	Juan Díaz – Undisputed champion (def. Julio Díaz)	13 Oct 2007 – 8 Mar 2008	1 (7)
57	Nate Campbell	8 Mar 2008 – 10 Jan 2009	0
Campbell vacated the title because of concerns regarding sanctioning fees and proposed mandatory defenses.
58	Paulus Moses – Regular champion (Primary champion vacant)	10 Jan – 28 Feb 2009	0
Moses is relegated to secondary champion due to Juan Manuel Márquez winning the vacant Super title.
59	Juan Manuel Márquez – Super champion (def. Juan Diaz)	28 Feb 2009 – 4 Jan 2012	2
Marquez stripped due to inactivity.
60	Richar Abril (interim champion promoted); (Primary champion vacant)	28 Feb 2013 – 10 Apr 2015	2
Abril was declared champion in recess after he cancelled his fight with Derry Matthews.
61	Darleys Pérez (interim champion promoted); (Primary champion vacant)	10 Apr – 21 Nov 2015	1
62	Anthony Crolla	21 Nov 2015 – 24 Sep 2016	1
63	Jorge Linares	24 Sep 2016 – 13 May 2018	3
Linares fought for Super title against Vasyl Lomachenko.
64	Vasiliy Lomachenko – Super champion (def. Jorge Linares)	13 May 2018 – 17 Oct 2020	3
65	Teófimo López	17 Oct 2020 – 27 Nov 2021	0
66	George Kambosos Jr	27 Nov 2021 – 5 Jun 2022	0
67	Devin Haney	5 Jun 2022 – 29 Nov 2023	2
Haney vacated the title to move up to super lightweight.
68	Gervonta Davis – Regular champion (Primary champion vacant)	29 Nov 2023 – 16 Jan 2026	2
Davis is declared champion in recess after being issued an arrest warrant.
69	Gervonta Davis (2) (reinstated); (Primary champion vacant)	25 Mar – 26 Jun 2026	0
Davis is declared champion in recess citing issues with availability due to an ongoing lawsuit.
70	Floyd Schofield (def. Lucas Bahdi)	10 Oct 2026 – present	0

=== Secondary champion lineage ===
No.	Name	Reign	Defenses
1	José Alfaro (def. Prawet Singwancha)	29 Dec 2007 – 19 May 2008	0
2	Yusuke Kobori	19 May 2008 – 3 Jan 2009	0
3	Paulus Moses	3 Jan – 10 Jan 2009	0
Moved to primary champion due to its vacancy.
4	Paulus Moses (2) (relegated from primary champion)	28 Feb 2009 – 29 May 2010	1
5	Miguel Acosta	29 May 2010 – 26 Feb 2011	0
6	Brandon Ríos	26 Feb – 3 Dec 2011	1
Rios was stripped of title before his second defense against John Murray for being overweight.
7	Gervonta Davis (def. Yuriorkis Gamboa)	28 Dec 2019 – 29 Nov 2023	4
Moved to primary champion due to its vacancy.

== Super featherweight ==
=== Primary champion lineage ===
No.	Name	Reign	Defenses
1	Tod Morgan (awarded inaugural title)	16 Dec 1927 – 19 Dec 1929	5
2	Benny Bass	19 Dec 1929 – 15 Jul 1931	0
3	Kid Chocolate	15 Jul 1931 – 20 Sep 1932	3
On 20 September 1932, the NBA decided not to recognize the division.
4	Kid Chocolate (2) (reinstated as champion)	28 Mar – 25 Dec 1933	3
5	Frankie Klick	25 Dec 1933 – 5 Mar 1934	0
Klick vacated the title to move up to the light welterweight division
6	Sandy Saddler (def. Orlando Zulueta)	6 Dec 1949 – 21 Jan 1957	2
Saddler vacated the title to stay at featherweight
7	Harold Gomes (def. Paul Jorgensan)	20 Jul 1959 – 16 Mar 1960	0
8	Gabriel Elorde	16 Mar 1960 – 15 Jun 1967	10
9	Yoshiaki Numata	15 Jun – 14 Dec 1967	0
10	Hiroshi Kobayashi	14 Dec 1967 – 29 Jul 1971	6
11	Alfredo Marcano	29 Jul 1971 – 25 Apr 1972	1
12	Ben Villaflor	25 Apr 1972 – 12 Mar 1973	1
13	Kuniaki Shibata	12 Mar – 17 Oct 1973	1
14	Ben Villaflor (2)	17 Oct 1973 – 16 Oct 1976	5
15	Samuel Serrano	16 Oct 1976 – 2 Aug 1980	10
16	Yasutsune Uehara	2 Aug 1980 – 9 Apr 1981	1
17	Samuel Serrano (2)	9 Apr 1981 – 19 Jan 1983	3
18	Roger Mayweather	19 Jan 1983 – 26 Feb 1984	2
19	Rocky Lockridge	26 Feb 1984 – 19 May 1985	2
20	Wilfredo Gómez	19 May 1985 – 24 May 1986	0
21	Alfredo Layne	24 May – 27 Sep 1986	0
22	Brian Mitchell	27 Sep 1986 – 25 Apr 1991	12
Mitchell vacated the title to spend time with his family and business.
23	Joey Gamache (def. Jerry Ngobeni)	28 Jun – 20 Oct 1991	0
Gamache vacates the title to move up to lightweight.
24	Genaro Hernández (def. Daniel Londas)	22 Nov 1991 – 13 Jul 1995	8
Hernandez was stripped of the title when he chose to challenge WBO lightweight champion Oscar De La Hoya instead of fighting his mandatory challenger.
25	Choi Yong-soo (def. Víctor Hugo Paz)	21 Oct 1995 – 5 Sep 1998	7
26	Takanori Hatakeyama	5 Sep 1998 – 27 Jun 1999	1
27	Lakva Sim	27 Jun – 31 Oct 1999	0
28	Baek Jong-kwon	31 Oct 1999 – 21 May 2000	1
29	Joel Casamayor	21 May 2000 – 12 Jan 2002	4
Casamayor fought for the inaugural Super title against WBO champion Acelino Freitas.
30	Acelino Freitas – Super champion (def. Joel Casamayor)	12 Jan – 5 Aug 2002	1
30	Status changes to Unified champion on WBA's July 2002 ratings posted on 5 August.		
30	Acelino Freitas – Unified champion	5 Aug 2002 – 10 Feb 2004	2 (3)
Freitas' title is declared vacant on WBA's January 2004 ratings posted on 10 February.
31	Yodsanan Sor Nanthachai – Regular champion (Primary champion vacant)	10 Feb 2004 – 30 Apr 2005	1
32	Vicente Mosquera	30 Apr 2005 – 5 Aug 2006	1
33	Edwin Valero	5 Aug 2006 – 3 Sep 2008	4
Valero vacated the title and moved up to lightweight.
34	Jorge Linares (def. Whyber Garcia); (Primary champion vacant)	28 Nov 2008 – 10 Oct 2009	1
35	Juan Carlos Salgado	10 Oct 2009 – 11 Jan 2010	0
36	Takashi Uchiyama	11 Jan 2010 – 21 Feb 2015	9
36	Uchiyama promoted to Super champion.		
36	Takashi Uchiyama – Super champion (Regular champion promoted)	21 Feb 2015 – 27 Apr 2016	2 (11)
37	Jezreel Corrales	27 Apr 2016 – 20 Oct 2017	2
Corrales came in overweight and was stripped of his Super title. Machado fought for the vacant Regular title.
38	Alberto Machado (def. Jezreel Corrales); (Primary champion vacant)	21 Oct 2017 – 21 Apr 2018	0
Machado is relegated to secondary champion due to Gervonta Davis winning the vacant Super title.
39	Gervonta Davis – Super champion (def. Jesús Cuellar)	21 Apr 2018 – 2 Sep 2019	2
Davis vacated the title and moved up to lightweight.
40	Andrew Cancio – Regular champion (Primary champion vacant)	2 Sep – 23 Nov 2019	0
Léo Santa Cruz won the vacant Super title an hour before Cancio finished his fight against René Alvarado. Cancio is relegated to secondary champion.
41	Léo Santa Cruz – Super champion (def. Miguel Flores)	23 Nov 2019 – 31 Oct 2020	0
42	Gervonta Davis (2)	31 Oct 2020 – 28 Aug 2021	0
Davis vacates the title to stay at a higher weight class.
43	Roger Gutiérrez (Primary champion vacant)	28 Aug 2021 – 20 Aug 2022	0
44	Héctor García	20 Aug 2022 – 25 Nov 2023	0
45	Lamont Roach Jr.	25 Nov 2023 – 6 Dec 2025	1
Roach Jr. is stripped of the title for moving up in weight class.
46	Jazza Dickens (interim champion promoted); (Primary champion vacant)	6 Dec 2025 – 14 Mar 2026	0
47	Anthony Cacace	14 Mar – 8 Sep 2026	0
47	Cacace promoted to Super champion.		
47	Anthony Cacace – Super champion	8 Sep 2026 – present	0

=== Secondary champion lineage ===
No.	Name	Reign	Defenses
1	Yodsanan Sor Nanthachai (def. Lakva Sim)	13 Apr 2002 – 10 Feb 2004	2
Moved to primary champion due to its vacancy.
2	Javier Fortuna (def. Bryan Vásquez)	29 May 2015 – 24 Jun 2016	1
3	Jason Sosa	24 Jun 2016 – 15 Feb 2017	1
Sosa vacates title to fight WBO champion Vasyl Lomachenko.
4	Alberto Machado (relegated from primary champion)	21 Apr 2018 – 9 Feb 2019	2
5	Andrew Cancio	9 Feb – 2 Sep 2019	1
Moved to primary champion due to its vacancy.
6	Andrew Cancio (2) (relegated from primary champion)	1 Sep – 23 Nov 2019	0 (1)
7	René Alvarado	23 Nov 2019 – 2 Jan 2021	0
8	Roger Gutiérrez	2 Jan – 28 Aug 2021	1
Moved to primary champion due to its vacancy.
8	Elnur Samedov (interim champion promoted)	8 Sep 2026 – present	0

== Featherweight ==
=== Primary champion lineage ===
No.	Name	Reign	Defenses
1	Benny Bass (def. Red Chapman)	12 Sep 1927 – 10 Feb 1928	0
2	Tony Canzoneri	10 Feb – 28 Sep 1928	0
3	André Routis	28 Sep 1928 – 23 Sep 1929	1
4	Christopher Battalino	23 Sep 1929 – 27 Jan 1932	5
Battalino is stripped of the title for missing weight in a title fight against Freddie Miller which ended in a controversial no contest.
5	Tommy Paul (def. Johnny Pena)	26 May 1932 – 13 Jan 1933	0
6	Freddie Miller	13 Jan 1933 – 11 May 1936	12
7	Petey Sarron	11 May 1936 – 29 Oct 1937	2
8	Henry Armstrong	29 Oct 1937 – 12 Sep 1938	0
Armstrong vacated the title to stay at the higher weight divisions.
9	Joey Archibald (def. Leo Rodak)	29 Oct 1939 – 29 Mar 1940	1
Archibald was stripped of the title for not fighting Petey Scalzo. Scalzo and Frankie Perrin was slated to fight for the vacant title however, Perrin refused to fight in Washington and preferred to fight in his home city of New Orleans. Scalzo was later awarded of the title by the NBA.
10	Petey Scalzo (awarded title)	1 May 1940 – 1 Jul 1941	3
11	Richie Lemos	1 Jul – 18 Nov 1941	0
12	Jackie Wilson	18 Nov 1941 – 18 Jan 1943	1
13	Jackie Callura	18 Jan – 16 Aug 1943	1
14	Phil Terranova	16 Aug 1943 – 10 Mar 1944	0
15	Sal Bartolo	10 Mar 1944 – 7 Jun 1946	3
16	Willie Pep	7 Jun 1946 – 29 Oct 1948	2
17	Sandy Saddler	29 Oct 1948 – 11 Feb 1949	0
18	Willie Pep (2)	11 Feb 1949 – 8 Sep 1950	3
19	Sandy Saddler (2)	8 Sep 1950 – 16 Jan 1957	3
Saddler was stripped of the title for failing to sign for a title defense. A few days later, he retired.
20	Hogan Bassey (def. Cherif Hamia)	24 Jun 1957 – 18 Mar 1959	1
21	Davey Moore	18 Mar 1959 – 21 Mar 1963	5
22	Sugar Ramos (def. Davey Moore)	21 Mar 1963 – 26 Sep 1964	3
23	Vicente Saldívar	26 Sep 1964 – 14 Oct 1967	7
Saldívar retired after his 7th defense.
24	Raul Rojas (def. Enrique Higgins)	28 Mar – 27 Sep 1968	0
25	Shozo Saijo	27 Sep 1968 – 2 Sept 1971	5
26	Antonio Gomez	2 Sept 1971 – 19 Aug 1972	1
27	Ernesto Marcel	19 Aug 1972 – 31 May 1974	4
Marcel retires.
28	Rubén Olivares (def. Zensuke Otagawa)	9 July – 23 Nov 1974	0
29	Alexis Argüello	23 Nov 1974 – 9 Oct 1976	4
Argüello vacated the title because the WBA wanted to set a fight date that's imposed by the mandatory challenger and not him, the champion.
30	Rafael Ortega (def. Francisco Coronado)	15 Jan – 17 Dec 1977	1
31	Cecilio Lastra	17 Dec 1977 – 15 Apr 1978	0
32	Eusebio Pedroza	15 Apr 1978 – 8 Jun 1985	19
33	Barry McGuigan	8 Jun 1985 – 23 Jun 1986	2
34	Steve Cruz	23 Jun 1986 – 6 Mar 1987	0
35	Antonio Esparragoza	6 Mar 1987 – 30 Mar 1991	7
36	Park Yong-kyun	30 Mar 1991 – 4 Dec 1993	8
37	Eloy Rojas	4 Dec 1993 – 18 May 1996	6
38	Wilfredo Vázquez	18 May 1996 – 25 Mar 1998	4
Vázquez vacated the title infavor of fighting WBO champion Naseem Hamed.
39	Freddie Norwood (def. Antonio Cermeño)	3 Apr – 21 Sep 1998	2
Norwood was stripped of his title for coming overweight to his 3rd defense fight against Koji Matsumoto.
40	Antonio Cermeño (def. Genaro Rios)	3 Oct 1998 – 29 May 1999	1
41	Freddie Norwood (2)	29 May 1999 – 9 Sep 2000	3
42	Derrick Gainer	9 Sep 2000 – 1 Nov 2003	3
Gainer fought for the inaugural Unified title against IBF champion Juan Manuel Márquez.
43	Juan Manuel Márquez – Unified champion (def. Derrick Gainer)	1 Nov 2003 – 22 Aug 2005	3
Márquez was stripped of the IBF title because no promoter was willing to bid at least US$50,000 to stage a mandatory defense against Fahprakorb Rakkiatgym. As a result, he was stripped of his WBA Unified title on WBA's July 2005 official ratings posted on 22 August.
44	Chris John – Regular champion (Primary champion vacant)	22 Aug 2005 – 27 Jun 2009	7
44	John is promoted to Super champion.		
44	Chris John – Super champion (Regular champion promoted)	27 Jun 2009 – 14 Jul 2010	1 (8)
John was declared champion in recess after suffering a rib injury.
45	Yuriorkis Gamboa – Regular champion (Primary champion vacant)	14 Jul – 11 Sep 2010	0
45	Gamboa was declared the Unified champion after winning the vacant IBF title against Orlando Salido.		
45	Yuriorkis Gamboa – Unified champion (def. Orlando Salido)	11 Sep – 5 Dec 2010	1
Gamboa is relegated to secondary champion when John was reinstated as Super champion after winning against Fernando Saucedo.
46	Chris John (2) – Super champion (reinstated)	5 Dec 2010 – 6 Dec 2013	6
John fought for the Undisputed title against Simpiwe Vetyeka.
47	Simpiwe Vetyeka – Undisputed champion (def. Chris John)	6 Dec 2013 – 31 May 2014	0
48	Nonito Donaire	31 May – 18 Oct 2014	0
Donaire lost to Regular champion Nicholas Walters however, Walters was not given the Undisputed title.
49	Nicholas Walters – Regular champion (Primary champion vacant)	18 Oct 2014 – 21 Feb 2015	1
49	Walters promoted to Super champion.		
49	Nicholas Walters – Super champion (Regular champion promoted)	21 Feb – 12 Jun 2015	0 (1)
Walters was stripped of the title for failing to make weight on his first defense fight against Miguel Marriaga. The title was at stake for Marriaga but Walters won by unanimous decision.
50	Jesús Cuellar – Regular champion (Primary champion vacant)	12 Jun – 29 Aug 2015	0
Cuéllar was relegated to secondary champion because Léo Santa Cruz won the vacant Super title.
51	Léo Santa Cruz – Super champion (def. Abner Mares)	29 Aug 2015 – 30 Jul 2016	1
52	Carl Frampton	30 Jul 2016 – 28 Jan 2017	0
53	Léo Santa Cruz (2)	28 Jan 2017 – 12 Dec 2022	3
Santa Cruz vacated the title on the day of the scheduled purse bid against Regular champion Leigh Wood.
54	Leigh Wood (Primary champion vacant)	12 Dec 2022 – 18 Feb 2023	0
55	Mauricio Lara	18 Feb – 26 May 2023	0
Lara was stripped for missing the weight before his rematch against Leigh Wood.
56	Leigh Wood (2) (def. Mauricio Lara); (Primary champion vacant)	27 May – 17 Oct 2023	1
Wood vacated the title to move up to super featherweight.
57	Raymond Ford (def. Otabek Kholmatov); (Primary champion vacant)	2 Mar – 1 Jun 2024	0
58	Nick Ball	1 Jun 2024 – 7 Feb 2026	3
59	Brandon Figueroa	7 Feb – 16 Oct 2026	0
Figueroa was stripped of the title after missing weight prior to his fight against Tomoki Kameda.

=== Secondary champion lineage ===
No.	Name	Reign	Defenses
1	Chris John (interim champion promoted)	1 Nov 2003 – 22 Aug 2005	4
Moved to primary champion due to its vacancy.
2	Yuriorkis Gamboa (interim champion promoted)	27 Jun 2009 – 14 Jul 2010	3
Moved to primary champion due to its vacancy.
3a	Yuriorkis Gamboa (2) – Unified champion (relegated from primary champion)	5 Dec 2010 – 11 Jun 2011	1 (5)
Gamboa was stripped of his Unified title for not complying with the IBF rules of a second weigh-in in his last fight with Jorge Solís. He was stripped of the IBF title and thus was no longer a unified champion.
3b	Jonathan Victor Barros (def. Irving Berry)	4 Dec 2010 – 14 Oct 2011	2
4	Celestino Caballero	14 Oct 2011 – 7 Oct 2012	1
Caballero vacated the title for declining a low budget on a mandatory fight with Nicholas Walters.
5	Nicholas Walters (def. Daulis Prescott)	9 Dec 2012 – 18 Oct 2014	2
Walters won against Undisputed champion Nonito Donaire however, he was not given the Undisputed title. He is moved to primary champion due to its vacancy.
6	Jesús Cuellar (interim champion promoted)	21 Feb – 12 Jun 2015	1
Moved to primary champion due to its vacancy.
7	Jesús Cuéllar (2) (relegated from primary champion)	29 Aug 2015 – 10 Dec 2016	1 (2)
8	Abner Mares	10 Dec 2016 – 9 Jun 2018	1
Mares lost against Super champion Léo Santa Cruz.
9	Jesús Rojas (interim champion promoted)	4 Jul 2018 – 26 Jan 2019	0
10	Xu Can	26 Jan 2019 – 31 Jul 2021	2
11	Leigh Wood	31 Jul 2021 – 12 Dec 2022	1
Moved to primary champion due to its vacancy.

== Super bantamweight ==
=== Primary champion lineage ===
No.	Name	Reign	Defenses
1	Hong Soo-hwan (def. Hector Carrasquilla)	26 Nov 1977 – 7 May 1978	1
2	Ricardo Cardona	7 May 1978 – 4 May 1980	5
3	Leo Randolph	4 May – 9 Aug 1980	0
4	Sergio Víctor Palma	9 Aug 1980 – 12 Jun 1982	5
5	Leo Cruz	12 Jun 1982 – 22 Feb 1984	3
6	Loris Stecca	22 Feb – 26 May 1984	0
7	Victor Callejas	26 May 1984 – 21 Nov 1986	2
Callejas was stripped of the title for refusing to fight his mandatory challenger.
8	Louie Espinoza (def. Tommy Valoy)	11 Jan – 28 Nov 1987	2
9	Julio Gervacio	28 Nov 1987 – 27 Feb 1988	0
10	Bernardo Piñango	27 Feb – 28 May 1988	0
11	Juan José Estrada	28 May 1988 – 11 Nov 1989	3
12	Jesus Salud	11 Nov 1989 – 5 Apr 1990	0
Salud was stripped of the title for failing to defend it in Colombia against the No. 1 contender, Luis Mendoza.
13	Luis Mendoza (def. Rubén Darío Palacios)	11 Sep 1990 – 7 Oct 1991	4
14	Raúl Pérez	7 Oct 1991 – 27 Mar 1992	0
15	Wilfredo Vázquez	27 Mar 1992 – 13 May 1995	9
16	Antonio Cermeño	13 May 1995 – 4 Oct 1997	7
Cermeño vacated the title to move up to featherweight.
17	Enrique Sánchez (def. Rafael del Valle)	8 Feb – 12 Dec 1998	0
18	Néstor Garza	12 Dec 1998 – 4 Mar 2000	2
19	Clarence Adams	4 Mar 2000 – 3 Jul 2001	2
Adams was stripped of the title for refusing to fight his mandatory challenger.
20	Yober Ortega (def. José Rojas)	17 Nov 2001 – 21 Feb 2002	0
21	Yoddamrong Sithyodthong	21 Feb – 18 May 2002	0
22	Osamu Sato	18 May – 9 Oct 2002	0
23	Salim Medjkoune	9 Oct 2002 – 4 Jul 2003	1
24	Mahyar Monshipour	4 Jul 2003 – 18 Mar 2006	5
25	Somsak Sithchatchawal	18 Mar – 4 Oct 2006	0
26	Celestino Caballero	4 Oct 2006 – 21 Nov 2008	5
26	Caballero fought for the Unified title against IBF champion Steve Molitor.		
26	Celestino Caballero – Unified champion (def. Steve Molitor)	21 Nov 2008 – Mar 2010	3 (8)
26	Caballero promoted to inaugural Super champion on WBA's February 2010 official ratings posted on March.		
26	Celestino Caballero – Super champion (Unified champion promoted)	Mar – 10 Dec 2010	0 (8)
Caballero vacated the title to fight at featherweight.
27	Lee Ryol-li – Regular champion (Primary champion vacant)	10 Dec 2010 – 31 Jan 2011	0
28	Akifumi Shimoda	31 Jan – 9 Jul 2011	0
29	Rico Ramos	9 Jul 2011 – 20 Jan 2012	0
30	Guillermo Rigondeaux	20 Jan 2012 – 13 Apr 2013	2
30	Rigondeaux fought for Super title against Nonito Donaire.		
30	Guillermo Rigondeaux – Super champion (def. Nonito Donaire)	13 Apr 2013 – 30 Oct 2015	4 (6)
Rigondeaux was declared champion in recess due to inactivity.
31	Scott Quigg – Regular champion (Primary champion vacant)	30 Oct 2015 – 27 Feb 2016	0
Quigg fought for Unified title against IBF champion Carl Frampton.
32	Carl Frampton – Unified champion (def. Scott Quigg)	27 Feb – 8 Apr 2016	0
Frampton was stripped of the title after choosing to fight Léo Santa Cruz for the WBA featherweight title instead of Super champion Guillermo Rigondeaux.
33	Guillermo Rigondeaux (2) – Super champion (reinstated)	14 May 2016 – 9 Dec 2017	1
Rigondeaux was stripped of the title after losing to a super featherweight bout against Vasyl Lomachenko.
34	Daniel Roman – Regular champion (Primary champion vacant)	9 Dec 2017 – 26 Apr 2019	3
34	Roman becomes Unified champion after beating IBF champion T. J. Doheny.		
34	Daniel Roman – Unified champion (def. T. J. Doheny)	26 Apr 2019 – 30 Jan 2020	1 (4)
Roman fought Murodjon Akhmadaliev for the Super title.
35	Murodjon Akhmadaliev – Super champion (def. Daniel Roman)	30 Jan 2020 – 8 Apr 2023	3
36	Marlon Tapales	8 Apr – 26 Dec 2023	0
37	Naoya Inoue	26 Dec 2023 – present	7

=== Secondary champion lineage ===
No.	Name	Reign	Defenses
1	Ricardo Cordoba (interim champion promoted)	21 Nov 2008 – 21 Mar 2009	0
2	Bernard Dunne	21 Mar – 26 Sep 2009	0
3	Poonsawat Kratingdaenggym	26 Sep 2009 – 2 Oct 2010	2
4	Lee Ryol-li	2 Oct – 10 Dec 2010	0
Moved to primary champion due to its vacancy.
5	Scott Quigg (interim champion promoted)	5 Sep 2013 – 30 Oct 2015	6
Moved to primary champion due to its vacancy.
6	Nehomar Cermeño (def. Qiu Xiaojun)	24 Jun 2016 – 9 Apr 2017	2
7	Shun Kubo	9 Apr – 3 Sep 2017	0
8	Daniel Roman	3 Sep – 9 Dec 2017	0
Moved to primary champion due to its vacancy.
9	Brandon Figueroa (interim champion promoted)	31 Oct 2019 – 27 Nov 2021	3
WBA decided on 17 August 2021, that Figueroa's title would be stripped the moment he steps in the ring against WBO champion Stephen Fulton due to WBO's restriction against WBA Regular titles. The bout was supposedly scheduled on 18 September however, it was moved to 27 November. On 1 September, WBA released their August 2021 ratings which did not feature Figueroa as a champion however, he was listed again on the September 2021 ratings. He was officially stripped of the title after fighting Fulton as originally stated by the WBA.

== Bantamweight ==
=== Primary champion lineage ===
No.	Name	Reign	Defenses
1	Joe Lynch (awarded inaugural title)	Jan – 25 Jul 1921	0
2	Pete Herman	25 July – 23 Sep 1921	0
3	Johnny Buff	23 Sep 1921 – 10 Jul 1922	1
4	Joe Lynch (2)	10 Jul 1922 – 21 Mar 1924	3
5	Abe Goldstein	21 Mar – 19 Dec 1924	3
6	Eddie Martin	19 Dec 1924 – 20 Mar 1925	1
7	Charlie Phil Rosenberg	20 Mar 1925 – 18 Oct 1926	1
Rosenberg was stripped by the NBA during its annual convention after failing to sign a fight with Bud Taylor.
8	Bud Taylor (awarded title)	18 Oct 1926 – 18 May 1928	2
Taylor was stripped when he failed to fight for the title for almost two years.
9	Bushy Graham (def. Isadore Schwartz)	23 May 1928 – 8 Oct 1929	0
Graham was stripped of the title due to the NBA choosing to recognize Panamá Al Brown instead.
10	Panamá Al Brown (awarded title)	8 Oct 1929 – 3 Feb 1930	1
Brown was stripped of the title after an NBA special meeting.
11	Panamá Al Brown (2) (def. Eugène Huat)	4 Oct 1930 – 18 Sep 1934	7
Brown was stripped of the title in the rankings released after the annual NBA convention.
12	Sixto Escobar (def. Pete Sanstol)	7 Aug – 26 Aug 1935	0
13	Lou Salica	26 Aug – 15 Nov 1935	0
14	Sixto Escobar (2)	15 Nov 1935 – 23 Sep 1937	3
15	Harry Jeffra	23 Sep 1937 – 20 Feb 1938	0
16	Sixto Escobar (3)	20 Feb 1938 – 26 Oct 1939	1
Escobar vacated the title to move up to featherweight.
17	Georgie Pace (awarded title)	26 Oct 1939 – 24 Sep 1940	1
18	Lou Salica (2)	24 Sep 1940 – 7 Aug 1942	4
19	Manuel Ortiz	7 Aug 1942 – 6 Jan 1947	15
20	Harold Dade	6 Jan – 11 Mar 1947	0
21	Manuel Ortiz (2)	11 Mar 1947 – 31 May 1950	4
22	Vic Toweel	31 May 1950 – 15 Nov 1952	3
23	Jimmy Carruthers	15 Nov 1952 – 16 May 1954	3
Carruthers retires from boxing.
24	Robert Cohen (def. Chamroen Songkitrat)	19 Sep – 23 Dec 1954	1
Cohen was stripped for failing to sign a fight against Raúl Macías within 90 days.
25	Raúl Macías (def. Chamroen Songkitrat)	9 Mar 1955 – 6 Nov 1957	2
26	Alphonse Halimi	6 Nov 1957 – 8 Jul 1959	0
27	José Becerra	8 Jul 1959 – 30 Aug 1960	2
Becerra retires due to an eye injury.
28	Éder Jofre (def. Eloy Sanchez)	18 Nov 1960 – 18 May 1965	8
29	Fighting Harada	18 May 1965 – 27 Feb 1968	4
30	Lionel Rose	27 Feb 1968 – 22 Aug 1969	3
31	Rubén Olivares	22 Aug 1969 – 16 Oct 1970	2
32	Chucho Castillo	16 Oct 1970 – 2 Apr 1971	0
33	Rubén Olivares (2)	2 Apr 1971 – 19 Mar 1972	2
34	Rafael Herrera	19 Mar – 29 Jul 1972	0
35	Enrique Pinder	29 Jul 1972 – 20 Jan 1973	0
36	Romeo Anaya	20 Jan – 3 Nov 1973	2
37	Arnold Taylor	3 Nov 1973 – 3 Jul 1974	0
38	Hong Soo-hwan	3 Jul 1974 – 14 Mar 1975	1
39	Alfonso Zamora	14 Mar 1975 – 19 Nov 1977	5
40	Jorge Luján	19 Nov 1977 – 29 Aug 1980	5
41	Julian Solís	29 Aug – 14 Nov 1980	0
42	Jeff Chandler	14 Nov 1980 – 7 Apr 1984	9
43	Richie Sandoval	7 April 1984 – 10 Mar 1986	2
44	Gaby Canizales	10 Mar – 4 Jun 1986	0
45	Bernardo Piñango	4 Jun 1986 – 13 Mar 1987	3
Piñango vacated the title in order to move up to super bantamweight.
46	Takuya Muguruma (def. Azael Moran)	29 Mar – 24 May 1987	0
47	Park Chan-Yong	24 May – 4 Oct 1987	0
48	Wilfredo Vázquez	4 Oct 1987 – 9 May 1988	1
49	Kaokor Galaxy	9 May – 14 Aug 1988	0
50	Moon Sung-kil	14 Aug 1988 – 9 Jul 1989	2
51	Kaokor Galaxy (2)	9 Jul – 18 Oct 1989	0
52	Luisito Espinosa	18 Oct 1989 – 19 Oct 1991	2
53	Israel Contreras	19 Oct 1991 – 15 Mar 1992	0
54	Eddie Cook	15 Mar – 9 Oct 1992	0
55	Jorge Eliécer Julio	9 Oct 1992 – 23 Oct 1993	2
56	Junior Jones	23 Oct 1993 – 22 Apr 1994	1
57	John Michael Johnson	22 Apr – 16 Jul 1994	0
58	Daorung Chuvatana	16 Jul 1994 – 17 Sep 1995	2
59	Veeraphol Sahaprom	17 Sep 1995 – 28 Jan 1996	0
60	Nana Konadu	28 Jan – 27 Oct 1996	0
61	Daorung Chuvatana (2)	27 Oct 1996 – 21 Jun 1997	1
62	Nana Konadu (2)	21 Jun 1997 – 5 Dec 1998	1
63	Johnny Tapia	5 Dec 1998 – 26 Jun 1999	0
64	Paulie Ayala	26 Jun 1999 – 6 Aug 2001	3
Ayala was stripped of the title for choosing to move up to super bantamweight instead of fighting his mandatory challenger.
65	Eidy Moya (def. Adán Vargas)	14 Oct 2001 – 19 Apr 2002	0
66	Johnny Bredahl	19 Apr 2002 – 13 Oct 2004	3
Bredahl retires.
67	Volodymyr Sydorenko (def. Julio Zarate)	26 Feb 2005 – 31 May 2008	6
68	Anselmo Moreno	31 May 2008 – Nov 2010	8
68	Moreno is promoted to inaugural Super champion on WBA's October 2010 ratings posted on November.		
68	Anselmo Moreno – Super champion (Regular champion promoted)	Nov 2010 – 26 Sep 2014	4 (12)
Moreno fought for the Undisputed title against Juan Carlos Payano.
69	Juan Carlos Payano – Undisputed champion (def. Anselmo Moreno)	26 Sep 2014 – 18 Jun 2016	1
70	Rau'shee Warren	18 Jun 2016 – 10 Feb 2017	0
71	Zhanat Zhakiyanov	10 Feb – 21 Oct 2017	0
Zhakiyanov fought IBF champion Ryan Burnett for the Unified title.
72	Ryan Burnett – Unified champion (def. Zhanat Zhakiyanov)	21 Oct 2017 – 31 Oct 2018	1
72	Burnett is promoted to Super champion on WBA's October 2018 ratings posted on 31st October; just days before his scheduled bout against Nonito Donaire.		
72	Ryan Burnett – Super champion (Unified champion promoted)	31 Oct – 3 Nov 2018	0 (1)
73	Nonito Donaire	3 Nov 2018 – 7 Nov 2019	1
74	Naoya Inoue	7 Nov 2019 – 13 Jan 2023	5
Inoue vacated the title in order to move up to super bantamweight.
75	Takuma Inoue (def. Liborio Solís); (Primary champion vacant)	8 Apr 2023 – 13 Oct 2024	2
76	Seiya Tsutsumi	13 Oct 2024 – 17 May 2025	1
Tsutsumi is declared champion in recess for being medically unfit to defend against mandatory challenger Antonio Vargas.
77	Antonio Vargas (interim champion promoted); (Primary champion vacant)	17 May – 1 Dec 2025	1
Vargas is declared champion in recess for being unable to defend the title due to personal matters.
78	Seiya Tsutsumi (2) (reinstated); (Primary champion vacant)	1 Dec 2025 – 31 May 2026	1
Tsutsumi is declared champion in recess for being unable to defend the title due to medical situations.
79	Antonio Vargas (2) (reinstated); (Primary champion vacant)	31 May 2026 – 13 Jun 2026	0
80	Jesse Rodriguez	13 Jun – 10 Jul 2026	0
80	Promoted to Super champion on WBA's June 2026 official ratings posted on 10 July.		
80	Jesse Rodriguez – Super champion	10 Jul 2026 – present	0

=== Secondary champion lineage ===
No.	Name	Reign	Defenses
1	Kōki Kameda (def. Alexander Muñoz)	26 Dec 2010 – 6 Dec 2013	8
Kameda vacated the title after being ordered to fight Super champion Anselmo Moreno and moved down to super flyweight.
2	Jamie McDonnell (def. Tabtimdaeng Na Rachawat)	31 May 2014 – 25 May 2018	5
3	Naoya Inoue	25 May 2018 – 18 May 2019	1
3	Inoue becomes Unified champion after beating IBF champion Emmanuel Rodríguez.		
3	Naoya Inoue – Unified champion	18 May – 7 Nov 2019	1 (2)
Inoue won against Super champion Nonito Donaire.
4	Guillermo Rigondeaux (def. Liborio Solís)	8 Feb 2020 – 14 Aug 2021	0
Rigondeaux is stripped of his title for fighting WBO champion John Riel Casimero; a bout not sanctioned by the WBA.
5	Riku Masuda (def. Daigo Higa)	20 Jul 2026 – present	0

== Super flyweight ==
=== Primary champion lineage ===
No.	Name	Reign	Defenses
1	Gustavo Ballas (def. Bae Sok-Chul)	12 Sep – 5 Dec 1981	0
2	Rafael Pedroza	5 Dec 1981 – 8 Apr 1982	0
3	Jiro Watanabe	8 Apr 1982 – 5 Jul 1984	6
Watanabe was stripped of title for not fighting mandatory challenger Khaosai Galaxy.
4	Khaosai Galaxy (def. Eusebio Espinal)	21 Nov 1984 – 22 Dec 1991	19
Galaxy retired from professional boxing.
5	Katsuya Onizuka (def. Thanomsak Sithbaobay)	10 Apr 1992 – 18 Sep 1994	5
6	Lee Hyung-chul	18 Sep 1994 – 22 Jul 1995	1
7	Alimi Goitia	22 Jul 1995 – 24 Aug 1996	3
8	Yokthai Sithoar	24 Aug 1996 – 23 Dec 1997	4
9	Satoshi Iida	23 Dec 1997 – 23 Dec 1998	2
10	Jesús Rojas	23 Dec 1998 – 31 Jul 1999	1
11	Hideki Todaka	31 Jul 1999 – Oct 2000	2
12	Leo Gámez	9 Oct 2000 – 11 Mar 2001	0
13	Celes Kobayashi	11 Mar 2001 – 9 Mar 2002	1
14	Alexander Muñoz	9 Mar 2002 – 3 Dec 2004	3
15	Martín Castillo	3 Dec 2004 – 22 Jul 2006	3
16	Nobuo Nashiro	22 Jul 2006 – 3 May 2007	1
17	Alexander Munoz (2)	3 May 2007 – 17 May 2008	2
Muñoz fought for the inaugural Unified title against WBC champion Cristian Mijares.
18	Cristian Mijares – Unified champion (def. Alexander Muñoz)	17 May – 1 Nov 2008	1
Mijares fought for the Undisputed title against IBF champion Vic Darchinyan.
19	Vic Darchinyan – Undisputed champion (def. Cristian Mijares)	1 Nov 2008 – 28 Jul 2009	1
19	Status changed to Unified champion when Darchinyan vacated the IBF title.		
19	Vic Darchinyan – Unified champion	28 Jul 2009 – 15 Oct 2010	2 (3)
Darchinyan's title is vacated on WBA's September 2010 ratings posted on 15 October.
20	Hugo Cázares – Regular champion (Primary champion vacant)	15 Oct 2010 – 31 Aug 2011	2
21	Tomonobu Shimizu	31 Aug – 11 Nov 2011	0
Shimizu was declared champion in recess due to an injury.
22	Tepparith Kokietgym (interim champion promoted); (Primary champion vacant)	14 Nov 2011 – 31 Dec 2012	3
23	Kohei Kono	31 Dec 2012 – 6 May 2013	0
24	Liborio Solís	6 May – 2 Dec 2013	0
Solís was stripped of his title before the fight with Daiki Kameda for being overweight. Solís won the fight in split decision but title was at stake for Kameda only.
25	Kohei Kono (2) (def. Denkaosan Kaovichit); (Primary champion vacant)	26 Mar 2014 – 31 Aug 2016	3
26	Luis Concepción	31 Aug – 9 Dec 2016	0
Concepción was stripped of his title before the fight with Khalid Yafai for being overweight. Only Yafai can win the title.
27	Kal Yafai (def. Luis Concepción); (Primary champion vacant)	10 Dec 2016 – 29 Feb 2020	5
Yafai fought for the Super title against Román González.
28	Román González – Super champion (def. Khalid Yafai)	29 Feb 2020 – 13 Mar 2021	1
29	Juan Francisco Estrada	13 Mar 2021 – 11 Aug 2022	0
Estrada was stripped of the title after refusing to fight his mandatory challenger Joshua Franco.
30	Joshua Franco – Regular champion (Primary champion vacant)	11 Aug 2022 – 23 Jun 2023	1
Franco was stripped of the title after missing the weight before his rematch against Kazuto Ioka.
31	Kazuto Ioka (def. Joshua Franco); (Primary champion vacant)	24 Jun 2023 – 7 Jul 2024	1
32	Fernando Martínez	7 Jul 2024 – 22 Nov 2025	1
33	Jesse Rodriguez	22 Nov 2025 – 10 Jun 2026	0
Rodriguez vacated the title to move up to bantamweight.
34	David Jiménez (interim champion promoted); (Primary champion vacant)	13 Jun 2026 – present	0

=== Secondary champion lineage ===
No.	Name	Reign	Defenses
1	Nobuo Nashiro (def. Kohei Kono)	15 Sep 2008 – 8 May 2010	2
2	Hugo Cázares	8 May– 15 Oct 2010	2
Moved to primary champion due to its vacancy.
3	Andrew Moloney (interim champion promoted)	3 Mar – 23 Jun 2020	0
4	Joshua Franco	23 Jun 2020 – 11 Aug 2022	2
Moved to primary champion due to its vacancy.

== Flyweight ==
=== Primary champion lineage ===
No.	Name	Reign	Defenses
1	Jimmy Wilde (awarded inaugural title)	Jan 1921 – 18 Jun 1923	0
2	Pancho Villa	18 Jun 1923 – 14 Jul 1925	3
Title vacated because Villa died from Ludwig's angina resulting from an infection that spread to his throat.
3	Fidel LaBarba (def. Frankie Genaro)	22 Aug 1925 – 25 Aug 1927	2
LaBarba retires.
4	Pinky Silverberg (def. Ruby Bradley)	22 Oct – 3 Dec 1927	0
Silverberg was stripped of the title after a match was sanctioned for the vacant title.
5	Frenchy Belanger (def. Ernie Jarvis)	19 Dec 1927 – 6 Feb 1928	0
6	Frankie Genaro	6 Feb 1928 – 2 Mar 1929	3
7	Émile Pladner	2 Mar – 18 Apr 1929	0
8	Frankie Genaro (2)	18 Apr 1929 – 26 Oct 1931	7
9	Victor Perez	26 Oct 1931 – 31 Oct 1932	0
10	Jackie Brown	31 Oct 1932 – 17 Sep 1934	3
Brown was sentenced to a 4 month conviction to prison for biting a piece of a man's ear during a street fight. The title was declared vacant after an NBA meeting.
11	Benny Lynch (def. Jackie Brown)	9 Sep 1935 – 29 Jun 1938	3
Lynch was stripped when he failed to make weight for a title defense against Jackie Jurich.
12	Peter Kane (def. Jackie Jurich)	22 Sep 1938 – 11 Dec 1939	0
Kane's title was stripped when the NBA awarded Little Dado the flyweight title.
13	Little Dado (awarded title)	11 Dec 1939 – 14 Oct 1943	1
Dado was stripped of the title as he has not fought in the flyweight division for 2 years. Paterson was awarded the title.
14	Jackie Paterson (awarded title)	14 Oct 1943 – 30 Jul 1947	1
Paterson was stripped of the title for failing to defend against Dado Marino.
15	Rinty Monaghan (def. Dado Marino)	20 Oct 1947 – 30 Mar 1950	3
Monaghan retired after his third defense.
16	Terry Allen (def. Honore Pratesi)	25 Apr – 1 Aug 1950	0
17	Dado Marino	1 Aug 1950 – 19 May 1952	1
18	Yoshio Shirai	19 May 1952 – 26 Nov 1954	4
19	Pascual Perez	26 Nov 1954 – 16 Apr 1960	9
20	Pone Kingpetch	16 Apr 1960 – 10 Oct 1962	3
21	Fighting Harada	10 Oct 1962 – 12 Jan 1963	0
22	Pone Kingpetch (2)	12 Jan – 18 Sep 1963	0
23	Hiroyuki Ebihara	18 Sep 1963 – 23 Jan 1964	0
24	Pone Kingpetch (3)	23 Jan 1964 – 23 Apr 1965	0
25	Salvatore Burruni	23 Apr – 1 Nov 1965	0
Burruni was stripped of title for failing to meet the organization's number one contender, Hiroyuki Ebihara.
26	Horacio Accavallo (def. Katsuyoshi Takayama)	1 Mar 1966 – 2 Oct 1968	3
Accavallo retires.
27	Hiroyuki Ebihara (2) (def. José Severino)	30 Mar – 19 Oct 1969	0
28	Bernabe Villacampo	19 Oct 1969 – 5 Apr 1970	0
29	Berkrerk Chartvanchai	5 Apr – 22 Oct 1970	0
30	Masao Ohba	22 Oct 1970 – 25 Jan 1973	5
Ohba died in a car accident in Tokyo.
31	Chartchai Chionoi (def. Fritz Chervet)	17 May 1973 – 18 Oct 1974	2
32	Susumu Hanagata	18 Oct 1974 – 1 Apr 1975	0
33	Erbito Salavarria	1 Apr 1975 – 27 Feb 1976	1
34	Alfonso López	27 Feb – 2 Oct 1976	1
35	Guty Espadas	2 Oct 1976 – 12 Aug 1978	4
36	Betulio González	12 Aug 1978 – 17 Nov 1979	3
37	Luis Ibarra	17 Nov 1979 – 17 Feb 1980	0
38	Kim Tae-shik	17 Feb – 13 Dec 1980	1
39	Peter Mathebula	13 Dec 1980 – 28 Mar 1981	0
40	Santos Laciar	28 Mar – 6 Jun 1981	0
41	Luis Ibarra (2)	6 June – 26 Sep 1981	0
42	Juan Herrera	26 Sep 1981 – 1 May 1982	1
43	Santos Laciar (2)	1 May 1982 – 19 Jul 1985	9
Laciar vacated the title in order to move up to super flyweight.
44	Hilario Zapata (def. Alonzo González)	5 Oct 1985 – 13 Feb 1987	5
45	Fidel Bassa	13 Feb 1987 – 30 Sep 1989	6
46	Jesús Rojas	30 Sep 1989 – 10 Mar 1990	0
47	Lee Yul-woo	10 Mar – 29 Jul 1990	0
48	Leopard Tamakuma	29 Jul 1990 – Mar 1991	1
49	Elvis Álvarez	14 Mar – 1 Jun 1991	0
50	Kim Yong-kang	1 Jun 1991 – 26 Sep 1992	2
51	Aquiles Guzmán	26 Sep – 15 Dec 1992	0
52	David Grimán	15 Dec 1992 – 13 Feb 1994	2
53	Saen Sor Ploenchit	13 Feb 1994 – 24 Nov 1996	9
54	José Bonilla	24 Nov 1996 – 29 May 1998	3
55	Hugo Rafael Soto	29 May 1998 – 13 Mar 1999	0
56	Leo Gámez	13 Mar – 3 Sep 1999	0
57	Sornpichai Kratingdaenggym	3 Sep 1999 – 5 Aug 2000	1
58	Eric Morel	5 Aug 2000 – 6 Dec 2003	5
59	Lorenzo Parra	6 Dec 2003 – 19 Mar 2007	5
60	Takefumi Sakata	19 Mar 2007 – 31 Dec 2008	4
61	Denkaosan Kaovichit	31 Dec 2008 – 7 Feb 2010	2
62	Daiki Kameda	7 Feb 2010 – 4 Jan 2011	2
Kameda vacated the title in order to move up to super flyweight.
63	Luis Concepción (interim champion promoted)	4 Jan – 2 Apr 2011	0
64	Hernán Márquez	2 Apr 2011 – 17 Nov 2012	2
Marquez fought for Unified title against WBO champion Brian Viloria.
65	Brian Viloria – Unified champion (def. Hernán Márquez)	17 Nov 2012 – 6 Apr 2013	0
66	Juan Francisco Estrada	6 Apr 2013 – 14 Sep 2016	5
Estrada vacated the title and moved to super flyweight.
67	Kazuto Ioka – Regular champion (Primary champion vacant)	14 Sep 2016 – 9 Nov 2017	2
Ioka vacated the title.
68	Artem Dalakian (def. Brian Viloria); (Primary champion vacant)	24 Feb 2018 – 23 Jan 2024	6
69	Seigo Yuri Akui	23 Jan 2024 – 13 Mar 2025	2
70	Kenshiro Teraji	13 Mar – 30 Jul 2025	0
71	Ricardo Sandoval	30 Jul 2025 – 10 Oct 2026	0
72	Sergio Mendoza	10 Oct 2026 – present	0

=== Secondary champion lineage ===
No.	Name	Reign	Defenses
1	Juan Carlos Reveco (interim champion promoted)	17 Nov 2012 – 22 Apr 2015	6
2	Kazuto Ioka	22 Apr 2015 – 14 Sep 2016	3
Moved to primary champion due to its vacancy.

== Light flyweight ==
=== Primary champion lineage ===
No.	Name	Reign	Defenses
1	Jaime Rios (def. Rigoberto Marcano)	23 Aug 1975 – 2 Jul 1976	1
2	Juan Antonio Guzman	2 Jul – 10 Oct 1976	0
3	Yoko Gushiken	10 Oct 1976 – 8 Mar 1981	13
4	Pedro Flores	8 Mar – 19 Jul 1981	0
5	Kim Hwan-jin	19 Jul – 16 Dec 1981	1
6	Katsuo Tokashiki	16 Dec 1981 – 10 Jul 1983	5
7	Lupe Madera	10 Jul 1983 – 19 May 1984	1
8	Francisco Quiróz	19 May 1984 – 29 Mar 1985	1
9	Joey Olivo	29 Mar – 8 Dec 1985	1
10	Yuh Myung-woo	8 Dec 1985 – 17 Dec 1991	17
11	Hiroki Ioka	17 Dec 1991 – 18 Nov 1992	2
12	Yuh Myung-Woo (2)	18 Nov 1992 – 8 Sep 1993	1
Yuh vacated the title and retired from professional boxing.
13	Leo Gámez (def. Shiro Yahiro)	21 Oct 1993 – 4 Feb 1995	3
14	Choi Hi-yong	4 Feb 1995 – 13 Jan 1996	1
15	Carlos Murillo	13 Jan – 21 May 1996	1
16	Keiji Yamaguchi	21 May – 3 Dec 1996	1
17	Pichitnoi Sitbangprachan	3 Dec 1996 – Jul 2000	5
Sitbangprachan was stripped of title.
18	Beibis Mendoza (def. Rosendo Alvarez)	12 Aug 2000 – 3 Mar 2001	0
19	Rosendo Álvarez	3 Mar 2001 – 2 Oct 2004	3
Alvarez was stripped of title before his fourth fight with Beibis Mendoza for being overweight.
20	Roberto Vásquez (def. Beibis Mendoza)	29 Apr 2005 – 24 May 2006	3
Vásquez vacated the title to move up to flyweight.
21	Kōki Kameda (def. Juan José Landaeta)	2 Aug 2006 – 18 Jan 2007	1
Kameda vacated the title to move up to flyweight.
22	Juan Carlos Reveco (def. Nethra Sasiprapa)	22 Jun – 8 Dec 2007	1
23	Brahim Asloum	8 Dec 2007 – 18 Jul 2008	1
Asloum was declared champion in recess on WBA's June 2008 ratings posted on 18 July.
24	Giovani Segura (interim champion promoted)	5 Jun 2009 – 28 Aug 2010	3
24	Segura becomes the inaugural Unified champion after unifying with WBO and The Ring champion Iván Calderón.		
24	Giovani Segura – Unified champion (def. Iván Calderón)	28 Aug – 26 Nov 2010	1 (4)
Segura vacated the title to fight as flyweight.
25	Juan Carlos Reveco (2) – Regular champion (Primary champion vacant)	26 Nov 2010 – 4 Feb 2011	0
Reveco vacated the title to move up to flyweight.
26	Román González (interim champion promoted); (Primary champion vacant)	4 Feb 2011 – 30 Nov 2012	5
26	González promoted to inaugural Super champion.		
26	Román González – Super champion (Regular champion promoted)	30 Nov 2012 – 14 Jan 2014	0 (5)
González vacated the title to move up to flyweight.
27	Kazuto Ioka – Regular champion (Primary champion vacant)	14 Jan – 28 Feb 2014	0
Ioka vacated the title to move up to flyweight.
28	Alberto Rossel (interim champion promoted); (Primary champion vacant)	10 Jul – 31 Dec 2014	0
29	Ryoichi Taguchi	31 Dec 2014 – 31 Dec 2017	6
29	Taguchi declared Unified champion after unifying titles with IBF champion Milan Melindo.		
29	Ryoichi Taguchi – Unified champion (def. Milan Melindo)	31 Dec 2017 – 20 May 2018	1 (7)
Taguchi fought Budler for the Super title.
30	Hekkie Budler – Super champion (def. Ryoichi Taguchi)	20 May – 31 Dec 2018	0
31	Hiroto Kyoguchi	31 Dec 2018 – 1 Nov 2022	4
32	Kenshiro Teraji	1 Nov – 30 Nov 2022	0
32	Teraji status changed to Unified champion on WBA's November 2022 ratings.		
32	Kenshiro Teraji – Unified champion	30 Nov 2022 – 15 Jul 2024	3
Teraji vacates the title to move up to flyweight.
33	Erick Rosa (def. Neidar Valdez); (Primary champion vacant)	19 Dec 2024 – 30 Jul 2025	0
34	Kyosuke Takami	30 Jul – 17 Dec 2025	0
35	René Santiago	17 Dec 2025 – 28 Jul 2026	1
Santiago is declared champion in recess due to an injury.
36	Daiya Kira (def. Carlos Cañizales); (Primary champion vacant)	2 Sep – 30 Sep 2026	0
Kira is relegated to secondary champion after Santiago was reinstated as Unified champion on the September 2026 ratings.
37	René Santiago (2) – Unified champion (reinstated)	30 Sep 2026 – present	0

=== Secondary champion lineage ===
No.	Name	Reign	Defenses
1	Juan Carlos Reveco (interim champion promoted)	28 Aug – 26 Nov 2010	0
Moved to primary champion due to its vacancy.
2	Kazuto Ioka (def. José Alfredo Rodríguez)	31 Dec 2012 – 14 Jan 2014	3
Moved to primary champion due to its vacancy.
3	Carlos Cañizales (def. Reiya Konishi)	18 Mar 2018 – 21 May 2021	2
4	Esteban Bermudez	28 May 2021 – 10 Jun 2022	0
Bermudez lost against Super champion Hiroto Kyoguchi.
5	Daiya Kira (relegated from primary champion)	30 Sep 2026 – present	0

== Minimumweight ==
=== Primary champion lineage ===
No.	Name	Reign	Defenses
1	Leo Gámez (def. Kim Bong-Jun)	10 Jan 1988 – 1 Apr 1989	1
Gámez vacated the title citing weight problems and moved up to light flyweight.
2	Kim Bong-jun (def. Agustín García)	16 Apr 1989 – 2 Feb 1991	5
3	Choi Hi-yong	2 Feb 1991 – 14 Oct 1992	4
4	Hideyuki Ohashi	14 Oct 1992 – 10 Feb 1993	0
5	Chana Porpaoin	10 Feb 1993 – 2 Dec 1995	8
6	Rosendo Álvarez	2 Dec 1995 – 12 Nov 1998	5
Álvarez stripped of title before his fight with Ricardo López for being overweight. Title was at stake only for López who managed to beat the heavier Álvarez.
7	Ricardo López (def. Rosendo Álvarez)	13 Nov 1998 – Jul 1999	0
Lopez vacated the title in order to move up to light flyweight.
8	Noel Arambulet (def. Joma Gamboa)	9 Oct 1999 – 19 Aug 2000	1
Arambulet stripped of title before his rematch fight with Joma Gamboa for being overweight. Title was at stake only for Gamboa who managed to beat the heavier Arambulet.
9	Joma Gamboa (def. Noel Arambulet)	20 Aug – 6 Dec 2000	0
10	Keitaro Hoshino	6 Dec 2000 – 16 Apr 2001	0
11	Chana Porpaoin (2)	16 Apr – 25 Aug 2001	0
12	Yutaka Niida	25 Aug – 22 Oct 2001	0
Niida vacated the title and retired citing back problems and lack of interest in boxing.
13	Keitaro Hoshino (2) (def. Joma Gamboa)	29 Jan – 29 Jul 2002	0
14	Noel Arambulet (2)	29 Jul 2002 – 2 Jul 2004	2
Arambulet stripped of title before his rematch fight with Yutaka Niida for being overweight. Title was at stake only for Niida who managed to beat the heavier Arambulet.
15	Yutaka Niida (2) (def. Noel Arambulet)	3 Jul 2004 – 15 Sep 2008	7
16	Román González	15 Sep 2008 – 8 Oct 2010	3
González vacated in order to move up to light flyweight.
17	Kwanthai Sithmorseng (def. Pigmy Kokietgym)	5 Nov 2010 – 19 Apr 2011	0
18	Muhammad Rachman	19 Apr – 30 Jul 2011	0
19	Pornsawan Porpramook	30 Jul – 24 Oct 2011	0
20	Akira Yaegashi	24 Oct 2011 – 24 Jun 2012	0
21	Kazuto Ioka	24 Jun – 2 Oct 2012	0
Ioka vacated the title in order to move up to light flyweight.
22	Ryo Miyazaki (def. Pornsawan Porpramook)	31 Dec 2012 – 27 Dec 2013	2
Miyazaki vacated the title in order to move up to light flyweight.
23	Hekkie Budler (def. Karluis Díaz)	1 Mar 2014 – 19 Mar 2016	4
24	Byron Rojas	19 Mar – 29 Jun 2016	0
25	Knockout CP Freshmart	29 Jun 2016 – 1 Mar 2020	7
25	CP Freshmart is promoted to inaugural Super champion on WBA's February 2020 official ratings posted on 1 March.		
25	Knockout CP Freshmart – Super champion (Regular champion promoted)	1 Mar 2020 – 16 Nov 2024	5 (12)
26	Oscar Collazo	16 Nov 2024 – present	3

=== Secondary champion lineage ===
No.	Name	Reign	Defenses
1	Vic Saludar (def. Robert Paradero)	20 Feb – 21 Dec 2021	0
2	Erick Rosa	21 Dec 2021 – 15 Jan 2024	0
Rosa vacated the title to move up to light flyweight.
3	Ryūsei Matsumoto (def. Yuni Takada)	14 Sep 2025 – 1 Jun 2026	1
Matsumoto vacated the title to pursue fights beyond sanctioning body constraints.
4	Takeshi Ishii (def. Wilfredo Méndez)	2 Sep 2026 – present	0

== See also ==
- List of current world boxing champions
- List of undisputed boxing champions
- List of WBC world champions
- List of IBF world champions
- List of WBO world champions
- List of The Ring world champions
- List of NYSAC world champions
- List of WBA female world champions
- List of IBO world champions
