= Lee Hyung-chul (boxer) =

South Korean boxer (born 1969)

Personal information
- Nationality: South Korean
- Born: Hyung Chul Lee; December 13, 1969 (age 56) Gimje, South Korea
- Height: 5 ft 5 1/2 in (166 cm)
- Weight: Super flyweight

Boxing career
- Stance: Orthodox

Boxing record
- Total fights: 25
- Wins: 19
- Win by KO: 15
- Losses: 6

Lee Hyung-chul (born December 13, 1969, in Gimje, South Korea) is a South Korean former professional boxer who competed from 1987 to 1996. He won the World Boxing Association super flyweight title in 1994.

== Professional career ==
Lee turned professional in 1987 and compiled a record of 17–4 before facing and defeating Japanese boxer Katsuya Onizuka, to win the WBA Super flyweight title. He would defend the title against another Japanese boxer Tomonori Tamura in his next fight He would lose go on to lose the title to Venezuelan contender Alimi Goitia. He would unsuccessfully rematch Goitia seven months later this time losing via 12 round stoppage, he retired shortly after the fight.

== Professional boxing record ==
25 fights	19 wins	6 losses
By knockout	15	3
By decision	4	3

No.	Result	Record	Opponent	Type	Round, time	Date	Location	Notes
25	Loss	19–6	Alimi Goitia	TKO	12 (12)	1996-02-24	Gwangyang Gymnasium, Gwangyang, South Korea	For WBA super flyweight title
24	Loss	19–5	Alimi Goitia	KO	4 (12)	1995-07-22	Jangchung Arena, Seoul, South Korea	Lost WBA super flyweight title
23	Win	19–4	Tomonori Tamura	TKO	12 (12)	1995-02-25	Sajik Arena, Busan, South Korea	Retained WBA super flyweight title
22	Win	18–4	Katsuya Onizuka	TKO	9 (12)	1994-09-18	Yoyogi National Gymnasium, Tokyo, Japan	Won WBA super flyweight title
21	Win	17–4	Kenji Kanazawa	KO	2 (10)	1994-04-30	Munhwa Gymnasium, Seoul, South Korea	
20	Win	16–4	Jaime Banggot	KO	4 (10)	1993-10-31	Incheon Gymnasium, Incheon, South Korea	
19	Win	15–4	Hiroshi Kobayashi	KO	4 (10)	1993-06-26	Munhwa Gymnasium, Seoul, South Korea	
18	Win	14–4	Mario Parcon	KO	3 (10)	1993-03-27	Daegu, South Korea	
17	Win	13–4	Julius Tarona	PTS	10 (10)	1992-09-05	Daegu, South Korea	
16	Win	12–4	Sugar Ray Hynes	KO	10 (10)	1992-03-28	Chuncheon, South Korea	
15	Win	11–4	Tomohiko Yokoyama	KO	1 (10)	1991-11-23	Citizen Hall, Wondang, South Korea	
14	Win	10–4	Keun Ho Kim	KO	2 (10)	1991-07-06	Wondang, South Korea	Retained South Korean super flyweight title
13	Win	9–4	Chan Woo Park	KO	3 (10)	1991-04-06	Munhwa Gymnasium, Seoul, South Korea	Won vacant South Korean super flyweight title
12	Win	8–4	Tomoki Morikawa	UD	10 (10)	1990-11-26	Korakuen Hall, Tokyo, Japan	
11	Loss	7–4	David Grimán	PTS	10 (10)	1990-08-11	Korakuen Hall, Tokyo, Japan	
10	Win	7–3	Kyung Su Koo	KO	1 (8)	1990-04-22	Munhwa Gymnasium, Seoul, South Korea	
9	Win	6–3	Toshio Nayuki	KO	3 (6)	1990-03-11	Kyoto, Japan	
8	Win	5–3	Sung Keuk Park	PTS	6 (6)	1989-12-30	Munhwa Gymnasium, Seoul, South Korea	
7	Win	4–3	Keun Sun Hong	KO	1 (4)	1989-12-23	Munhwa Gymnasium, Seoul, South Korea	
6	Win	3–3	Jung Pil Lee	KO	1 (4)	1989-11-24	Munhwa Gymnasium, Seoul, South Korea	
5	Win	2–3	Soo Yong Jung	KO	2 (4)	1989-03-25	Olympic Fencing Gymnasium, Seoul, South Korea	
4	Loss	1–3	Joon Bum Koh	KO	2 (4)	1988-10-29	Municipal Ground, Ansan, South Korea	
3	Loss	1–2	Chang Ok Kim	PTS	4 (4)	1988-03-05	Daegu Gymnasium, Daegu, South Korea	
2	Win	1–1	Hee Hwan Moon	PTS	4 (4)	1987-11-18	Jecheon, South Korea	
1	Loss	0–1	Hun Yup Choi	PTS	4 (4)	1987-10-24	Jeongseon, South Korea	

== See also ==
- List of Korean boxers
- List of world super-flyweight boxing champions

Sporting positions
Regional boxing titles
Vacant Title last held by Kwang Bok Lim	South Korean super flyweight champion April 6, 1991 – 1991; Vacated	Vacant Title next held by In Shik Go
World boxing titles
Preceded by Katsuya Onizuka	WBA super flyweight champion September 18, 1994 – July 22, 1995	Succeeded by Alimi Goitia
