= Khaosai Galaxy vs. Kongtoranee Payakaroon =

- Date: Tuesday, January 26, 1988
- Venue: Lumpinee Stadium, Rama IV Road, Bangkok, Thailand
- Title(s) on the line: WBA Junior bantamweight championship

Tale of the tape
| Boxer | Khaosai Galaxy | Kongtoranee Payakaroon |
| Nickname | Sai taluang-sai (ซ้ายทะลวงไส้, "The Left That Drills Intestines") | |
| Hometown | Phetchabun, Thailand | Chachoengsao, Thailand |
| Purse | ฿300,000 or 400,000 (about) | ฿100,000 |
| Pre-fight record | 32-1-0 (29 KO) | 13-1-0 (9 KO) |
| Age | 28 years, 8 months | 27 years, 6 months |
| Height | 165 cm (5 ft 5 in) | 170 cm (5 ft 7 in) |
| Weight | 115 lb (52 kg) | 114.5 lb (52 kg) |
| Style | Southpaw | Orthodox |
| Recognition | WBA Junior bantamweight Champion | WBA; No. 1 Ranked Junior bantamweight Former WBC Super flyweight Challenger |

Result
- Khaosai wins via 12–round unanimous decision (118–110, 116–113, 116–114)

Khaosai Galaxy vs. Kongtoranee Payakaroon was a boxing match held at the Lumpinee Stadium on the Rama IV Road, Bangkok on January 26, 1988, to the world WBA super flyweight championship.

== Background ==
After Kongtoranee Payakaroon transitioned from Muay Thai to professional boxing, he scored nine consecutive wins, including a notable victory over former WBC super flyweight champion and Olympics bronze medalist Payao Poontarat, who was also a fellow Thai.

On December 19, 1987, Kongtoranee challenged reigning WBC super flyweight champion Gilberto Román at the Indoor Stadium Huamark. The result was a decisive defeat after 12 rounds, during which Kongtoranee's face became visibly swollen from Román's punches.

He continued to fight three more times and eventually climbed to the #1 ranking in the WBA super flyweight division, which was then also known as junior bantamweight.

At the same time, Khaosai Galaxy was rising as a national favorite in Thailand. He had successfully defended his WBA title six times, all by knockout. Two of those defenses took place abroad: the fourth in Curaçao against Israel Contreras, and the fifth in Indonesia against Ellyas Pical. The bout with Kongtoranee marked his seventh title defense and was also a mandatory fight.

This highly anticipated matchup garnered nationwide attention in Thailand and was dubbed "Suek Sailueat" (ศึกสายเลือด) or "The Battle of Lineage." It was only the second time in history that two Thai boxers met in a world title fight, following the bout between Chartchai Chionoi and Puntip Keosuriya in the 1960s.

In fact, Khaosai and Kongtoranee were already acquainted. Back in 1983, before Khaosai challenged Dominican fighter Eusebio Espinal for the vacant title, he had trained at the gym of Yodtong Senanan, who was also Kongtoranee's trainer. At the time, Kongtoranee served as one of Khaosai's sparring partners.

Kongtoranee later recalled that during one of their sparring sessions, Khaosai landed a punch to his head through the headgear. He felt dizzy and admitted that Khaosai's punches were incredibly powerful.

== The fight ==
The bout took place at Lumpinee Stadium, which was considered Kongtoranee's home turf. It was held from 6:00 PM to 8:00 PM and broadcast live on Channel 7. Kongtoranee, in the blue corner, employed a "hit-and-run" strategy throughout the match.

From rounds one to twelve, Kongtoranee moved in circles around the ring, almost as if he was trying to run away. Wichian Neelikanon, the ring announcer and commentator, even described the fight by saying that if Kongtoranee could have run away, he would have, likening it to "a police chasing a thief."

Khaosai, on the other hand, was the one who kept pressing forward. In the fifth round, however, he made a mistake and was caught by Kongtoranee's right cross, which caused him to lose his balance and fall to the canvas. He was counted by Japanese referee Ken Morita, but got back on his feet immediately, showing no signs of dizziness or injury, and continued to push forward aggressively.

After the final bell, Kongtoranee and his team, including promoter Songchai Rattanasuban, climbed into the ring and shouted with confidence that he was the winner. Most of the spectators at the stadium, who were largely Kongtoranee's supporters (Note: After 12 rounds, gamblers had Kongtoranee ahead of Khaosai at 70–1 odds.), also believed the same. Meanwhile, Khaosai and his team looked dejected, assuming they had lost.

Before the official decision was announced, chaos broke out in the ring. Many people rushed into the ring, making it impossible to proceed. Wichian repeatedly urged all unrelated individuals to leave the ring, warning that he would not be able to announce the decision otherwise. Songchai Rattanasuban, visibly furious, grabbed the microphone from Wichian and shouted, "You can't announce it. It's cheating!" The crowd joined in, chanting, "Cheating! Cheating! Cheating!"

When the result was finally read, Khaosai was declared the winner by unanimous decision (UD), with scores of 118–110, 116–113, and 116–114 from the three judges.

== Aftermath ==
This fight sparked widespread discussion and controversy. It also caused a temporary rift between Songchai Rattanasuban and Niwat Laosuwanwat, Khaosai's manager and promoter. As time passed, the two cleared the air.

Years later, Kongtoranee openly admitted that he had truly lost the bout. He explained that his strategy came from his Muay Thai background, where judges often favor fighters who display elegant techniques or clear dominance. He also confessed that even if he had won the title, he likely wouldn't have been able to hold it for long.

Both Khaosai and Kongtoranee recalled a brief exchange during the fight: "I want your belt," Kongtoranee said. "I won't give it," Khaosai replied.

That bout marked Kongtoranee Payakaroon's final appearance in western boxing before returning to Muay Thai. His record stood at 14 fights, with 12 wins (9 by knockout) and 2 losses.

As for Khaosai Galaxy, he went on to defend his title a total of 19 times. He eventually retired in late 1991, vacating the belt and cementing his legacy as the world champion with the most title defenses in the 115-pound division and holds a record that remains unbeaten among Asian fighters to this day. Notably, Kongtoranee was the first of only three challengers in history who managed to go the distance without being knocked out.

Many later compared this bout to the Oscar De La Hoya vs. Félix Trinidad fight in 1999, which took place years afterward. Both featured a technically skilled boxer using a hit-and-run style against a relentless pressure fighter, and both ended in controversial decisions that sparked widespread debate.
