= Khaosai Galaxy vs. Ellyas Pical =

1987 boxing match

- Date: Saturday, February 28, 1987
- Venue: Senayan Stadium, Jakarta, Indonesia
- Title(s) on the line: WBA Junior bantamweight championship

Tale of the tape
Boxer	Khaosai Galaxy	Ellyas Pical
Nickname	Sai taluang-sai (ซ้ายทะลวงไส้, "The Left That Drills Intestines")	"The Exocet"
Hometown	Phetchabun, Thailand	Saparua, Maluku, Indonesia
Purse	฿300,000 or 400,000 (about)	
Pre-fight record	29-1-0 (27 KO)	14-2-0 (10 KO)
Age	27 years, 9 months	26 years, 11 months
Height	165 cm (5 ft 5 in)	165 cm (5 ft 5 in)
Weight	115 lb (52 kg)	115 lb (52 kg)
Style	Southpaw	Southpaw
Recognition	WBA Junior bantamweight Champion	Two-time IBF Junior bantamweight Champion

Result
- Khaosai wins via 14th-round TKO

Khaosai Galaxy vs. Ellyas Pical was a professional boxing match held at the Senayan Stadium (now Gelora Bung Karno Stadium), Jakarta, Indonesia on February 28, 1987, for the WBA super flyweight (then junior bantamweight) championship.

== Background ==
At the end of 1986, Khaosai Galaxy successfully defended his title for the fourth time by knocking out local challenger Israel Contreras in five rounds on the island of Curaçao. It was a spectacular victory and marked Khaosai's first fight outside of Thailand, which helped solidify his popularity among Thai fans.

Meanwhile, Ellyas Pical was regarded as a national hero in Indonesia. He became the first Indonesian boxer to win a world title by capturing the IBF title in the same weight class as Khaosai, the super flyweight division at 115 pounds.

At that time, Pical was in his second reign as IBF champion and had recently defended his title by knocking out South Korean Dong Chun Lee in the 10th round. Notably, Lee had also been Khaosai's first title defense challenger just three months earlier.

This led to their showdown being viewed as a defining moment to determine who truly reigned supreme among Southeast Asian boxers.

Pical publicly declared that he would be the one to challenge Khaosai. However, Khaosai's manager Niwat Laosuwanwat and his trainer Phong Thawornwiwattanabut were confident that Khaosai would be able to defeat Pical with ease.

The fight was originally intended to be a unification bout between the WBA and IBF titles. However, after the match, the IBF declined to sanction the result. As a consequence, Pical was stripped of his title and the bout was officially recognized only as a WBA championship match.

== The fight ==
When the two finally met in the ring, Pical, as the IBF champion, wore white trunks with vertical blue stripes and yellow boots. Contrary to his earlier claims, he did not take the initiative to press forward but instead chose to retreat. Khaosai, in contrast, moved forward aggressively and used his signature style of driving his opponent into the ropes and delivering alternating punches to the head and body.

Although Pical rarely threw punches, when he did land a clean shot, the crowd of hundreds of thousands erupted in deafening cheers.

As the fight progressed, Pical's face became visibly swollen from the force of Khaosai's blows. A cut opened above his eyebrow, causing steady bleeding. He began to struggle to escape and was often cornered or pressed against the ropes, taking even more punishment.

Shortly after the bell signaled the start of round 14, Japanese referee Ken Morita temporarily stopped the fight and called in the ringside doctor to examine Pical's injuries. Once the doctor allowed the fight to resume, Khaosai capitalized on the opportunity and launched a relentless attack. Pical was left barely able to respond.

Suddenly, Morita stepped in, separated the fighters, and sent Khaosai to the neutral corner. He gave an eight-count to the exhausted Pical, who had slumped into his corner.

Khaosai resumed his assault, unleashing another series of heavy punches that eventually dropped Pical to the canvas. Referee Morita immediately stopped the fight, declaring Khaosai the winner by technical knockout (TKO) at 2 minutes and 45 seconds of round 14.

== Aftermath ==
After Khaosai decisively defeated their national hero, the Indonesian crowd reacted with loud boos directed at him and his team. Fearing for their safety, Khaosai and his entourage quickly left the venue and returned to their hotel with great relief.

It was later revealed that Pical's team had performed a black magic ritual before the fight, intending to intimidate Khaosai and empower Pical.

In addition, Khaosai himself disclosed many years later that someone had approached him before the fight and offered him $500,000 (Note: Converted to Thai baht, approximately ฿13 million.) to throw the match. He firmly refused and drove the person away.

As for Ellyas Pical, despite the devastating loss, he continued his boxing career and was eventually able to regain the IBF super flyweight title, becoming a three-time world champion.

Khaosai, on the other hand, went on to win many more fights. He successfully defended his title a total of 19 times. After his 19th defense in late 1991, he announced his retirement and relinquished the title. His record for title defenses remains the highest in the history of the 115-pound division and is still the number one among Asian boxers.

Kongtoranee Payakaroon, who was Khaosai’s challenger in one of those title defenses, later shared that after his loss to Khaosai, he did not return to Muay Thai right away. He was contacted by his promoter, Songchai Rattanasuban, with an offer to fight Pical in Indonesia, who had then reclaimed the IBF title for the third time. However, Kongtoranee declined the offer because he believed he would not be paid the agreed purse of ฿800,000.

== Broadcasting ==
Country	Broadcaster
Indonesia	TVRI
Thailand	Channel 7
