= List of world super-flyweight boxing champions =

This is a list of world super-flyweight boxing champions (also known as junior-bantamweight), as recognized by the four major sanctioning organizations in boxing:

- The World Boxing Association (WBA), established in 1921 as the National Boxing Association (NBA). The WBA often recognize up to two world champions in a given weight class; Super champion and Regular champion.
- The World Boxing Council (WBC), established in 1963.
- The International Boxing Federation (IBF), established in 1983.
- The World Boxing Organization (WBO), established in 1988.

== IBF ==
Reign Began	Reign Ended	Champion	Recognition
Title inaugurated
1983-12-10	1985-05-03	(South Korea) Chun Ju-do	IBF
1985-05-03	1986-02-15	(Indonesia) Ellyas Pical	IBF
1986-02-15	1986-07-05	(Dominican Republic) Cesar Polanco	IBF
1986-07-05	1987-02-28-Vacated	(Indonesia) Ellyas Pical	IBF
1987-05-17	1987-10-17	(South Korea) Chang Tae-il	IBF
1987-10-17	1989-10-14	(Indonesia) Ellyas Pical	IBF
1989-10-14	1990-04-21	(Colombia) Juan Polo Pérez	IBF
1990-04-21	1993-01-16	(United States) Robert Quiroga	IBF
1993-01-16	1994-08-29	(Mexico) Julio César Borboa	IBF
1994-08-29	1995-10-07	(Colombia) Harold Grey	IBF
1995-10-07	1996-04-27	(Argentina) Carlos Gabriel Salazar	IBF
1996-04-27	1996-08-24	(Colombia) Harold Grey	IBF
1996-08-24	1997-07-18	(United States) Danny Romero	IBF
1997-07-18	1998-12-05-Vacated	(United States) Johnny Tapia	IBF
1999-04-24	2000-02-12-Vacated	(United States) Mark Johnson	IBF
2000-07-22	2003-01-04	(Venezuela) Félix Machado	IBF
2003-01-04	2006-11-03-Stripped	(Nicaragua) Luis Alberto Pérez	IBF
2007-11-13	2008-08-02	(Russia) Dimitri Kirilov	IBF
2008-08-02	2009-07-28-Vacated	(Armenia) Vic Darchinyan	IBF
2009-09-15	2010-07-31	(South Africa) Simphiwe Nongqayi	IBF
2010-07-31	2010-12-11	(Mexico) Juan Alberto Rosas	IBF
2010-12-11	2011-08-18-Vacated	(Mexico) Cristian Mijares	IBF
2011-10-08	2012-02-11	(Mexico) Rodrigo Guerrero	IBF
2012-02-11	2013-06-08-Stripped	(Mexico) Juan Carlos Sánchez Jr.	IBF
2013-09-03	2014-03-19-Vacated	(Japan) Daiki Kameda	IBF
2014-07-18	2015-06-02-Vacated	(South Africa) Zolani Tete	IBF
2015-07-18	2016-09-03	(Puerto Rico) McJoe Arroyo	IBF
2016-09-03	2022-02-26	(Philippines) Jerwin Ancajas	IBF
2022-02-26	2024-10-29	(Argentina) Fernando Martínez	IBF
2025-05-23	2026-06-06	(Mexico) Willibaldo García	IBF
2026-06-06	Present	(Australia) Andrew Moloney	IBF

== WBC ==
Reign Began	Reign Ended	Champion	Recognition
Title inaugurated
1980-02-02	1981-01-24	(Venezuela) Rafael Orono	WBC
1981-01-24	1982-11-28	(South Korea) Kim Chul-ho	WBC
1982-11-28	1983-11-27	(Venezuela) Rafael Orono	WBC
1983-11-27	1984-07-05	(Thailand) Payao Poontarat	WBC
1984-07-05	1986-03-30	(Japan) Jiro Watanabe	WBC
1986-03-30	1987-05-16	(Mexico) Gilberto Román	WBC
1987-05-1	1987-08-08	(Argentina) Santos Laciar	WBC
1987-08-08	1988-04-08	(Colombia) Sugar Baby Rojas	WBC
1988-04-08	1989-11-07	(Mexico) Gilberto Román	WBC
1989-11-07	1990-01-20	(Ghana) Nana Konadu	WBC
1990-01-20	1993-11-13	(South Korea) Moon Sung-kil	WBC
1993-11-13	1994-05-04	(Mexico) José Luis Bueno	WBC
1994-05-04	1997-02-20	(Japan) Hiroshi Kawashima	WBC
1997-02-20	1998-08-29	(Philippines) Gerry Peñalosa	WBC
1998-08-29	2000-08-27	(South Korea) Cho In-joo	WBC
2000-08-27	2004-06-28	(North Korea) Masamori Tokuyama	WBC
2004-06-28	2005-07-18	(Japan) Katsushige Kawashima	WBC
2005-07-18	2006-12-06-Vacated	(North Korea) Masamori Tokuyama	WBC
2006-12-06	2008-11-01	(Mexico) Cristian Mijares	WBC
2008-11-01	2010-08-03-Stripped	(Armenia) Vic Darchinyan	WBC
2010-09-20	2011-08-19	(Mexico) Tomás Rojas	WBC
2011-08-19	2012-03-27	(Thailand) Suriyan Sor Rungvisai	WBC
2012-03-27	2013-05-03	(Japan) Yota Sato	WBC
2013-05-03	2014-05-31	(Thailand) Srisaket Sor Rungvisai	WBC
2014-05-31	2016-09-10	(Mexico) Carlos Cuadras	WBC
2016-09-10	2017-03-18	(Nicaragua) Román González	WBC
2017-03-18	2019-04-26	(Thailand) Srisaket Sor Rungvisai	WBC
2019-04-26	2021-03-26-Vacated	(Mexico) Juan Francisco Estrada	WBC
2022-02-05	2022-10-26-Vacated	(United States) Jesse Rodriguez	WBC
2022-12-03	2024-06-29	(Mexico) Juan Francisco Estrada	WBC
2024-06-29	2026-06-09-Vacated	(United States) Jesse Rodriguez	WBC

== WBA ==
Reign Began	Reign Ended	Champion	Recognition
Title inaugurated
1981-09-12	1981-12-05	(Argentina) Gustavo Ballas	WBA
1981-12-05	1982-04-08	(Panama) Rafael Pedroza	WBA
1982-04-08	1984-07-05-Stripped	(Japan) Jiro Watanabe	WBA
1984-11-21	1991-12-22-Retired	(Thailand) Khaosai Galaxy	WBA
1992-04-10	1994-09-18	(Japan) Katsuya Onizuka	WBA
1994-09-18	1995-07-22	(South Korea) Lee Hyung-chul	WBA
1995-07-22	1996-08-24	(Venezuela) Alimi Goitia	WBA
1996-08-24	1997-12-23	(Thailand) Yokthai Sithoar	WBA
1997-12-23	1998-12-23	(Japan) Satoshi Iida	WBA
1998-12-23	1999-07-31	(Venezuela) Jesús Rojas	WBA
1999-07-31	2000-10-09	(Japan) Hideki Todaka	WBA
2000-10-09	2001-03-11	(Venezuela) Leo Gámez	WBA
2001-03-11	2002-03-09	(Japan) Celes Kobayashi	WBA
2002-03-09	2004-12-03	(Venezuela) Alexander Muñoz	WBA
2004-12-03	2006-07-22	(Mexico) Martín Castillo	WBA
2006-07-22	2007-05-03	(Japan) Nobuo Nashiro	WBA
2007-05-03	2008-05-17	(Venezuela) Alexander Muñoz	WBA
2008-05-17	2008-11-01	(Mexico) Cristian Mijares	WBA (Super champion)
2008-09-15	2010-05-08	(Japan) Nobuo Nashiro	WBA (Regular Champion)
2008-11-01	2010-05-08-Vacated	(Armenia) Vic Darchinyan	WBA (Super Champion)
2010-05-08	2011-08-31	(Mexico) Hugo Cázares	WBA (Regular Champion)
2011-08-31	2011-11-10-Stripped	(Japan) Tomonobu Shimizu	WBA
2011-11-10	2012-12-31	(Thailand) Tepparith Kokietgym	WBA
2012-12-31	2013-05-06	(Japan) Kohei Kono	WBA
2013-05-06	2013-12-02-Stripped	(Venezuela) Liborio Solís	WBA
2014-03-26	2016-08-31	(Japan) Kohei Kono	WBA
2016-08-31	2016-12-10	(Panama) Luis Concepción	WBA
2016-12-10	2020-02-29	(United Kingdom) Kal Yafai	WBA
2020-02-29	2021-03-13	(Nicaragua) Román González	WBA (Super Champion)
2020-03-03	2020-06-23	(Australia) Andrew Moloney	WBA (Regular Champion)
2020-06-23	2022-08-11	(United States) Joshua Franco	WBA (Regular Champion)
2021-03-13	2022-08-11-Vacated	(Mexico) Juan Francisco Estrada	WBA (Super Champion)
2022-08-11	2023-06-23	(United States) Joshua Franco	WBA
2023-06-24	2024-07-07	(Japan) Kazuto Ioka	WBA
2025-11-22	2026-06-10-Vacated	(United States) Jesse Rodriguez	WBA
2026-06-13	Present	(Costa Rica) David Jiménez	WBA

== WBO ==
Reign Began	Reign Ended	Champion	Recognition
Title inaugurated
1989-04-29	1992-02-22	(Puerto Rico) José Ruiz	WBO
1992-02-22	1992-09-04	(Mexico) José Quirino	WBO
1992-09-04	1994-03-25-Vacated	(Denmark) Johnny Bredahl	WBO
1994-10-12	1998-02-13-Vacated	(United States) Johnny Tapia	WBO
1998-11-07	1999-06-07	(Argentina) Victor Godoi	WBO
1999-06-07	1999-11-20	(Mexico) Diego Morales	WBO
1999-11-20	2001-06-16	(Nicaragua) Adonis Rivas	WBO
2001-06-16	2002-06-22	(Panama) Pedro Alcázar	WBO
2002-06-22	2003-08-16	(Mexico) Fernando Montiel	WBO
2003-08-16	2004-09-25	(United States) Mark Johnson	WBO
2004-09-25	2005-04-09	(Mexico) Iván Hernández	WBO
2005-04-09	2009-02-10-Vacated	(Mexico) Fernando Montiel	WBO
2009-03-28	2009-09-04	(Puerto Rico) José Lopez	WBO
2009-09-04	2009-11-21-Stripped	(Philippines) Marvin Sonsona	WBO
2010-01-30	2010-04-24-Vacated	(Mexico) Jorge Arce	WBO
2010-05-15	2014-12-30	(Argentina) Omar Narváez	WBO
2014-12-30	2018-03-06-Vacated	(Japan) Naoya Inoue	WBO
2018-12-31	2019-02-28-Vacated	(Philippines) Donnie Nietes	WBO
2019-06-19	2023-02-14-Vacated	(Japan) Kazuto Ioka	WBO
2023-05-20	2023-12-13-Vacated	(Japan) Junto Nakatani	WBO
2024-02-24	2024-10-14	(Japan) Kosei Tanaka	WBO
2024-10-14	2025-07-19	(South Africa) Phumelele Cafu	WBO
2025-07-19	2026-06-10-Vacated	(United States) Jesse Rodriguez	WBO
2026-07-20	Present	(Japan) Kenshiro Teraji	WBO

== See also ==
- List of WBA world champions
- List of WBC world champions
- List of IBF world champions
- List of WBO world champions
- List of British world boxing champions
