= Chang Tae-il =

South Korean boxer

Personal information
- Nationality: South Korean
- Born: Chang Tae-il; April 10, 1965 (age 61) Damyang County, South Korea
- Height: 5 ft 8 in (173 cm)
- Weight: Super flyweight

Boxing career
- Stance: Southpaw

Boxing record
- Total fights: 31
- Wins: 26
- Win by KO: 11
- Losses: 4
- Draws: 1
- No contests: 0

Chang Tae-il (born April 10, 1965 in South Korea ) is a retired South Korean boxer.

== Professional career ==
After turning professional in 1981 he had compiled a record of 21-2-1 in 6 years before challenging for the vacant IBF super flyweight championship against Kwon Soon-chun in 1987. The title had been declared vacant after titleholder Ellyas Pical challenged and lost to WBA champion Khaosai Galaxy. Chang was successful in his fight against Kwon and won the IBF title. He lost the title in his first defense to the original titleholder Pical and would retire from the sport in 1989 after losing to WBA champion Khaosai Galaxy.

== See also ==
- List of super-flyweight boxing champions

Achievements
Vacant Title last held by Ellyas Pical	IBF super flyweight champion May 17, 1987 – October 17, 1987	Succeeded by Ellyas Pical
