= Juan Polo Pérez =

Colombian boxer (born 1963)

Personal information
- Nationality: Colombian
- Born: 17 October 1963 (age 62) Bolivar, Colombia
- Height: 1.65 m (5 ft 5 in)
- Weight: Super flyweight; Super bantamweight; Featherweight; Super featherweight; Lightweight

Boxing career
- Reach: 175 cm (69 in)
- Stance: Orthodox

Boxing record
- Total fights: 96
- Wins: 46
- Win by KO: 23
- Losses: 46
- Draws: 4

Juan Polo Pérez (born 17 October 1963) is a Colombian former professional boxer who competed from 1982 to 2007. He held the IBF super flyweight title from 1989 to 1990 and challenged for the WBA super bantamweight title in 1994.

== Professional career ==
After turning professional in 1982 he had compiled a record of 27-5-2 in 8 years before taking on Indonesian IBF super flyweight champion Ellyas Pical. He scored a unanimous decision victory over the titleholder and became the new IBF champion. It would prove to be a short reign as he would lose the title in his first defense against Robert Quiroga in a fight that took place in the U.K. Perez would have one more title shot against Wilfredo Vázquez but would be unsuccessful. He would win only 10 fights in the next 13 years as he retired in 2007 as 1 of 3 former world champions to retire with a record worse than .500 (along with Francisco Quiroz and Manny Melchor).

== Professional boxing record ==
96 fights	46 wins	46 losses
By knockout	23	18
By decision	23	27
By disqualification	0	1
Draws	4	

No.	Result	Record	Opponent	Type	Round	Date	Location	Notes
96	Loss	46–46–4	Wes Ferguson	TKO	5 (6)	Apr 6, 2007	Target Center, Minneapolis, Minnesota, U.S.	
95	Loss	46–45–4	Wilton Hilario	TKO	3 (6)	Jan 12, 2007	Target Center, Minneapolis, Minnesota, U.S.	
94	Loss	46–44–4	Allen Litzau	UD	6	Nov 17, 2006	Target Center, Minneapolis, Minnesota, U.S.	
93	Loss	46–43–4	Randall Bailey	KO	1 (8)	Jun 27, 2006	Sheraton Miami Mart Hotel, Miami, Florida, U.S.	
92	Loss	46–42–4	Isaac Mendoza	UD	10	Apr 27, 2006	Crowne Plaza Hotel, Tulsa, Oklahoma, U.S.	
91	Loss	46–41–4	David Díaz	TKO	3 (12)	Oct 21, 2005	Savvis Center, Saint Louis, Missouri, U.S.	For vacant IBA lightweight title
90	Loss	46–40–4	Juan Arroyo	UD	8	Sep 27, 2005	Sheraton Miami Mart Hotel, Miami, Florida, U.S.	
89	Loss	46–39–4	Monty Meza Clay	TKO	6 (8)	Aug 11, 2005	Mountaineer Casino Racetrack and Resort, Chester, West Virginia, U.S.	
88	Loss	46–38–4	Edner Cherry	UD	8	May 13, 2005	A La Carte Event Pavilion, Tampa, Florida, U.S.	
87	Loss	46–37–4	John Trigg	PTS	6	Jun 19, 2004	Biggs Boxing Forum, Doraville, Georgia, U.S.	
86	Loss	46–36–4	Robert Guerrero	TKO	2 (6)	Apr 24, 2004	Miccosukee Indian Gaming Resort, Miami, Florida, U.S.	
85	Loss	46–35–4	Mike Arnaoutis	MD	6	Apr 8, 2004	Wyndham Inner Harbor Hotel, Glen Burnie, Maryland, U.S.	
84	Loss	46–34–4	Michael Clark	DQ	6 (6)	Mar 13, 2004	PromoWest Pavilion, Columbus, Ohio, U.S.	
83	Loss	46–33–4	Jose Reyes	UD	6	Feb 27, 2004	Blue Horizon, Philadelphia, Pennsylvania, U.S.	
82	Loss	46–32–4	Koba Gogoladze	UD	6	Feb 7, 2004	Ballys Park Place Hotel Casino, Atlantic City, New Jersey, U.S.	
81	Win	46–31–4	Dillet Frederick	UD	6	Jan 23, 2004	A La Carte Event Pavilion, Tampa, Florida, U.S.	
80	Loss	45–31–4	Zahir Raheem	KO	3 (8)	Mar 28, 2003	Creek Nation Gaming Center, Tulsa, Oklahoma, U.S.	
79	Loss	45–30–4	Gary Balletto	KO	1 (10)	Jan 11, 2003	Dunkin Donuts Center, Providence, Rhode Island, U.S.	
78	Loss	45–29–4	Ángel Chacón	UD	10	Dec 14, 2002	Cancha Francisco Padilla, Arecibo, Puerto Rico	
77	Loss	45–28–4	Damian Fuller	UD	8	Oct 5, 2002	Cobo Hall, Detroit, Michigan, U.S.	
76	Loss	45–27–4	Miguel Callist	KO	1 (12)	Apr 19, 2002	Arena Panama Al Brown, Colon City, Panama	For WBA Fedelatin lightweight title
75	Loss	45–26–4	Santiago Rojas Alcantara	PTS	8	Oct 19, 2001	Palau Blaugrana-2, Barcelona, Spain	
74	Loss	45–25–4	Angel Manfredy	TKO	4 (10)	Jan 18, 2001	Grand Casino, Biloxi, Mississippi, U.S.	
73	Loss	45–24–4	Enrique Sánchez	TKO	4 (10)	Oct 8, 2000	Grand Victoria Casino, Elgin, Illinois, U.S.	
72	Win	45–23–4	Richard Sierra	UD	8	Aug 16, 2000	Dundee Training Center, Davie, Florida, U.S.	
71	Loss	44–23–4	Emmanuel Lucero	UD	10	Jul 15, 2000	Buchmuller Park, Secaucus, New Jersey, U.S.	
70	Loss	44–22–4	Leavander Johnson	TKO	3 (8)	Apr 1, 2000	Ballys Park Place Hotel Casino, Atlantic City, New Jersey, U.S.	
69	Draw	44–21–4	Manuel Calvo	PTS	12	Feb 11, 2000	Palacio de los Deportes, Barcelona, Spain	For TWBA featherweight title
68	Win	44–21–3	Angel Rosario	PTS	8	Dec 4, 1999	Mahi Temple Shrine Auditorium, Miami, Florida, U.S.	
67	Win	43–21–3	Johnny West	SD	8	Nov 17, 1999	Cristal Nightclub, Miami Beach, Florida, U.S.	
66	Win	42–21–3	Quincy Pratt	UD	8	Sep 29, 1999	Cristal Nightclub, Miami Beach, Florida, U.S.	
65	Loss	41–21–3	Richard Sierra	SD	10	Aug 21, 1999	PAL Gymnasium, Homestead, Florida, U.S.	
64	Loss	41–20–3	Oscar León	PTS	10	Apr 3, 1999	Hilton Hotel, Cartagena, Colombia	
63	Loss	41–19–3	Jorge Páez	KO	2 (12)	Nov 14, 1998	County Coliseum, El Paso, Texas, U.S.	For vacant IBA Americas super-featherweight title
62	Win	41–18–3	Juan Manuel Chavez	UD	10	Sep 28, 1998	Great Western Forum, Inglewood, California, U.S.	
61	Loss	40–18–3	César Soto	TKO	2 (10)	Jun 13, 1998	Sun Bowl, El Paso, Texas, U.S.	
60	Loss	40–17–3	Wayne McCullough	SD	10	May 19, 1998	Memorial Coliseum, Corpus Christi, Texas, U.S.	
59	Win	40–16–3	Pablo Osuna	PTS	10	Jul 19, 1997	Cartagena, Colombia	
58	Draw	39–16–3	Victor Polo	PTS	10	May 3, 1997	Cartagena, Colombia	
57	Loss	39–16–2	Ever Beleno	TKO	7 (10)	Jan 31, 1997	Cartagena, Colombia	
56	Win	39–15–2	Edward Barrios	PTS	10	Dec 20, 1996	Cartagena, Colombia	
55	Win	38–15–2	Mikael Nilsson	UD	6	Mar 29, 1996	Brondby Hallen, Brondby, Denmark	
54	Loss	37–15–2	Julien Lorcy	PTS	8	Feb 3, 1996	Palais des Sport Marcel Cerdan, Levallois-Perret, France	
53	Loss	37–14–2	Jimmi Bredahl	PTS	8	Nov 24, 1995	Randers Hallen, Randers, Denmark	
52	Loss	37–13–2	Naseem Hamed	KO	2 (12)	Jul 1, 1995	Royal Albert Hall, London, England	For WBC International super-bantamweight title
51	Loss	37–12–2	Lehlo Ledwaba	SD	10	May 6, 1995	Village Green, Durban, South Africa	
50	Loss	37–11–2	Manuel Medina	UD	12	Apr 15, 1995	Jai Alai Fronton, Miami, Florida, U.S.	For vacant WBC FECARBOX featherweight title
49	Win	37–10–2	Toribio Riasco	TKO	6 (?)	Dec 2, 1994	Cartagena, Colombia	
48	Loss	36–10–2	Wilfredo Vázquez	UD	12	Oct 13, 1994	Palais Marcel Cerdan, Levallois-Perret, France	For WBA super-bantamweight title
47	Win	36–9–2	José Sanabria	UD	8	May 14, 1994	Jai Alai Fronton, Miami, Florida, U.S.	
46	Win	35–9–2	Elvis Mejia	KO	6 (?)	Dec 3, 1993	Cartagena, Colombia	
45	Win	34–9–2	Wilson Sarabia	TKO	5 (?)	Apr 20, 1993	Cartagena, Colombia	
44	Win	33–9–2	Juan Rodriguez	TKO	10 (10)	Apr 2, 1993	Plaza de Toros de Cartagena de Indias, Cartagena, Colombia	
43	Loss	32–9–2	Ernie Cataluna	KO	1 (?)	Sep 9, 1992	Nippon Budokan, Tokyo, Japan	
42	Win	32–8–2	Manuel Ariza	KO	5 (10)	Jul 31, 1992	Coliseo Cubierto Menor de Coldeportes, Cartagena, Colombia	
41	Win	31–8–2	Guillermo Salcedo	PTS	10	Apr 15, 1992	Cartagena, Colombia	
40	Loss	30–8–2	Nana Konadu	PTS	12	Oct 25, 1991	Zaragoza, Spain	For vacant IBC super-flyweight title
39	Win	30–7–2	Guillermo Salcedo	PTS	10	Jul 12, 1991	Cartagena, Colombia	
38	Loss	29–7–2	Joel Luna Zárate	PTS	10	Apr 11, 1991	Arena Coliseo, Mexico City, Mexico	
37	Win	29–6–2	Sergio Lugares	KO	1 (?)	Mar 15, 1991	Simon Bolivar Olympic Villa, Santa Marta, Colombia	
36	Loss	28–6–2	Robert Quiroga	UD	12	Apr 21, 1990	Crowtree Leisure Centre, Sunderland, England	Lost IBF super-flyweight title
35	Win	28–5–2	Ellyas Pical	UD	12	Oct 14, 1989	Valley Sports Arena, Roanoke, Virginia, U.S.	Won IBF super-flyweight title
34	Win	27–5–2	Alfredo Gomez	KO	2 (?)	Mar 3, 1989	Medellin, Colombia	
33	Win	26–5–2	Efrain Betancourt	TKO	3 (?)	Sep 3, 1988	Plaza de Toros de Cartagena de Indias, Cartagena, Colombia	
32	Win	25–5–2	Argemiro Colon	TKO	2 (?)	May 28, 1988	Plaza de Toros Monumental del Caribe, Barranquilla, Colombia	
31	Draw	24–5–2	Eudo Bermudez	PTS	10	Feb 26, 1988	Cartagena, Colombia	
30	Win	24–5–1	Efrain Betancourt	TKO	8 (?)	Nov 6, 1987	Santa Marta, Colombia	
29	Win	23–5–1	Álvaro Mercado	PTS	10	Jul 31, 1987	Barranquilla, Colombia	
28	Win	22–5–1	Alfredo Lugo	PTS	10	Jul 3, 1987	Cartagena, Colombia	
27	Win	21–5–1	Prudencio Cardona	PTS	10	May 25, 1987	Cartagena, Colombia	
26	Win	20–5–1	Jaime Paternina	KO	2 (?)	Mar 14, 1987	San Andres, Colombia	
25	Win	19–5–1	Agustin Higirio	PTS	6	Jan 23, 1987	Cartagena, Colombia	
24	Win	18–5–1	Andres Cassiani	PTS	6	Dec 12, 1986	Cartagena, Colombia	
23	Win	17–5–1	Heriberto Gelez	PTS	6	Nov 28, 1986	Cartagena, Colombia	
22	Win	16–5–1	Joaquin Flores Caraballo	TKO	4 (?)	Sep 19, 1986	Cartagena, Colombia	
21	Loss	15–5–1	Michael Anthony Parris	PTS	10	Aug 3, 1986	Georgetown, Guyana	
20	Win	15–4–1	Francisco Alvarez	PTS	10	Jul 5, 1986	Cartagena, Colombia	
19	Win	14–4–1	Prudencio Cardona	PTS	10	Jan 13, 1986	Cartagena, Colombia	
18	Win	13–4–1	Alex Miranda	TKO	6 (?)	Oct 18, 1985	Cartagena, Colombia	
17	Draw	12–4–1	Sugar Baby Rojas	PTS	10	Jul 20, 1985	Plaza de Toros de Cartagena de Indias, Cartagena, Colombia	
16	Win	12–4	Valerio Zea	PTS	8	May 3, 1985	Cartagena, Colombia	
15	Win	11–4	Alfredo Gomez	TKO	7 (?)	Apr 19, 1985	Cartagena, Colombia	
14	Win	10–4	Eduardo Williams	KO	5 (?)	Mar 29, 1985	Cartagena, Colombia	
13	Win	9–4	Raul Ernesto Diaz	PTS	10	Mar 2, 1985	Cartagena, Colombia	
12	Loss	8–4	Miguel Maturana	TKO	2 (?)	Jul 28, 1984	Cartagena, Colombia	
11	Loss	8–3	Hilario Zapata	UD	10	Jun 23, 1984	Centro de Convenciones Atlapa, Panama City, Panama	
10	Win	8–2	Alfredo Herrera	TKO	8 (?)	May 18, 1984	Santa Marta, Colombia	
9	Loss	7–2	Alberto Castro	PTS	10	Dec 23, 1983	Monteria, Colombia	Lost Colombian flyweight title
8	Loss	7–1	Alberto Castro	PTS	10	Sep 16, 1983	Sincelejo, Colombia	
7	Win	7–0	Wilfredo Ruiz	TKO	9 (10)	Jun 18, 1983	Cartagena, Colombia	Won vacant Colombian flyweight title
6	Win	6–0	Rafael Julio	TKO	5 (?)	Jun 2, 1983	Santa Marta, Colombia	
5	Win	5–0	Victor Tejedor	KO	5 (?)	Apr 6, 1983	Cartagena, Colombia	
4	Win	4–0	Sofanor Rodriguez	KO	1 (?)	Mar 4, 1983	Santa Marta, Colombia	
3	Win	3–0	Bombillo Teheran	KO	1 (?)	Feb 4, 1983	Santa Marta, Colombia	
2	Win	2–0	Carlos Hernandez	KO	4 (?)	Nov 5, 1982	Santa Marta, Colombia	
1	Win	1–0	Arnold Rocha	TKO	1 (4)	Oct 8, 1982	Santa Marta, Colombia	

== See also ==
- List of super-flyweight boxing champions

Achievements
Preceded by Ellyas Pical	IBF super flyweight champion October 14, 1989 – April 21, 1990	Succeeded by Robert Quiroga
