= Cesar Polanco =

Dominican Republic boxer (born 1967)

César Polanco
Personal information
- Nickname: El Patico
- Nationality: Dominican
- Born: César Polanco; November 29, 1967 (age 58) Santiago, Dominican Republic
- Weight: Flyweight; Super flyweight

Boxing career
- Stance: Orthodox

Boxing record
- Total fights: 38
- Wins: 33
- Win by KO: 24
- Losses: 4
- Draws: 1
- No contests: 0

César Polanco (born November 29, 1967, in The Dominican Republic) is a retired Dominican boxer.

== Professional career ==
After turning professional in 1983 he had compiled a record of 15-1-1 in 3 years before travelling to Indonesia in 1986 to face IBF super flyweight champion Ellyas Pical. He scored a split decision victory over titleholder Ellyas Pical and became the new IBF champion. Polanco returned to Indonesia later in the year for a rematch and would lose the title via knockout in his first title defense in the third round after getting hit on his solar plexus. Cesar would never challenge for a title again and would end up retiring from the sport in 1993.

== Professional boxing record ==
38 fights	33 wins	4 losses
By knockout	24	1
By decision	8	3
By disqualification	1	0
Draws	1	

No.	Result	Record	Opponent	Type	Round, time	Date	Location	Notes
38	Win	33–4–1	Fernando Canelo	KO	4	29 Nov 1993	Dominican Republic	
37	Win	32–4–1	José Jiménez	PTS	10	21 Jun 1991	Dominican Republic	
36	Win	31–4–1	Ángel Vargas	TKO	8	14 May 1993	Fajardo, Puerto Rico	
35	Loss	30–4–1	Miguel Lora	UD	10	23 Apr 1993	Coliseo El Salitre, Bogotá, Colombia	
34	Win	30–3–1	José Sánchez	TKO	1	3 Apr 1993	Dominican Republic	
33	Win	29–3–1	Pablo Calderón	KO	2 (10)	10 Nov 1992	Santiago de los Caballeros, Santiago, Dominican Republic	
32	Win	28–3–1	Luis Yampier	PTS	8	27 Mar 1992	Aguadilla, Puerto Rico	
31	Win	27–3–1	Ángel Vargas	TKO	4	4 Nov 1991	San Juan, Puerto Rico	
30	Win	26–3–1	Ricardo Pascual	KO	7	21 Mar 1991	Santo Domingo, Distrito Nacional, Dominican Republic	
29	Win	25–3–1	Rafael Ramos	KO	4	26 Jan 1991	Puerto Plata, Puerto Plata Province, Dominican Republic	
28	Win	24–3–1	Luis Malavé	PTS	10	12 Dec 1989	Dominican Republic	
27	Win	23–3–1	Pascual Polanco	KO	1	13 Nov 1989	Santiago de los Caballeros, Santiago, Dominican Republic	
26	Win	22–3–1	Enrique Sánchez	KO	5	22 Sep 1989	Palacio de los Deportes, Santiago de los Caballeros, Dominican Republic	
25	Win	21–3–1	Francisco Mateo	TKO	6	4 Sep 1989	Santo Domingo, Distrito Nacional, Dominican Republic	
24	Win	20–3–1	Ricardo Johnson	KO	1	27 Jul 1989	Santiago de los Caballeros, Santiago, Dominican Republic	
23	Loss	19–3–1	Nana Konadu	PTS	12	11 Mar 1989	Accra Sports Stadium, Accra, Ghana	Lost WBC International super-flyweight title
22	Win	19–2–1	Bernardo Díaz	KO	3	25 Apr 1988	Dominican Republic	
21	Win	18–2–1	Franco Cherchi	TKO	6 (12), 2:30	16 Aug 1987	Salerno, Campania, Italy	Won inaugural WBC International super-flyweight title
20	Win	17–2–1	Alfredo Gómez	KO	3	29 Apr 1987	Willemstad, Curaçao	
19	Loss	16–2–1	Ellyas Pical	KO	3 (15), 2:40	5 Jul 1986	Bung Karno Stadium, Jakarta, Indonesia	Lost IBF super-flyweight title
18	Win	16–1–1	Ellyas Pical	SD	15	15 Feb 1986	P.I. Arena-Coliseum, Jakarta, Indonesia	Won IBF super-flyweight title
17	Win	15–1–1	Fernando Mateo	KO	5	25 Nov 1985	Santiago de los Caballeros, Santiago, Dominican Republic	
16	Loss	14–1–1	Julio Gudiño	MD	10	16 Nov 1985	Gimnasio Nuevo Panamá, Panama City, Panama	
15	Win	14–0–1	Elpidio de Paula	TKO	7	16 Apr 1985	Santiago de Caballeros, Santiago, Dominican Republic	
14	Win	13–0–1	Isaías Rodríguez	DQ	2	11 Mar 1985	Santiago de los Caballeros, Santiago, Dominican Republic	
13	Win	12–0–1	David Reyes	TKO	4 (12)	31 Jan 1985	Santiago de los Caballeros, Santiago, Dominican Republic	Won vacant WBC Continental Americas flyweight title
12	Win	11–0–1	Víctor Espinal	KO	3	20 Oct 1984	Santiago de los Caballeros, Santiago, Dominican Republic	
11	Draw	10–0–1	Rafael Cabrera	PTS	10	13 Sep 1984	Santiago de los Caballeros, Santiago, Dominican Republic	
10	Win	10–0	Punco Jorge	KO	?	21 Aug 1984	Dominican Republic	
9	Win	9–0	Quiro Hernández	KO	?	25 Jul 1984	Dominican Republic	
8	Win	8–0	Punco Jorge	KO	?	20 May 1984	Dominican Republic	
7	Win	7–0	Bernardo Díaz	PTS	8	12 Mar 1984	Santiago de los Caballeros, Santiago, Dominican Republic	
6	Win	6–0	Rafael Ramos	TKO	3	7 Dec 1983	Santiago de los Caballeros, Santiago, Dominican Republic	
5	Win	5–0	Juan María Ortiz	TKO	1	16 Nov 1983	Santiago de los Caballeros, Santiago, Dominican Republic	
4	Win	4–0	Vicente Arias	PTS	6	17 Ocr 1983	Santiago de los Caballeros, Santiago, Dominican Republic	
3	Win	3–0	Rafael Ramos	PTS	6	26 Sep 1983	Santiago de los Caballeros, Santiago, Dominican Republic	
2	Win	2–0	Isaias Noesi	PTS	4	25 Jul 1983	Santiago de los Caballeros, Santiago, Dominican Republic	
1	Win	1–0	Elpidio Jiménez	KO	1 (4)	25 May 1983	Santiago de los Caballeros, Santiago, Dominican Republic	

== See also ==
- List of super-flyweight boxing champions

Achievements
Preceded by Ellyas Pical	IBF super flyweight champion February 15, 1986 – July 5, 1986	Succeeded by Ellyas Pical
