= Kaokor Galaxy =

Thai boxer (born 1959)

Khaokor Galaxy
Personal information
- Nickname: Rote
- Born: Pirachai Saenkham (formerly Surote Saenkham and Virote Saenkham); May 15, 1959 (age 67) Ban Cha Lianglab, Tambon Na Pa, Mueang Phetchabun, Phetchabun, Thailand
- Height: 5 ft 4 in (163 cm)
- Weight: Bantamweight

Boxing career
- Stance: Southpaw

Boxing record
- Total fights: 26
- Wins: 24
- Win by KO: 19
- Losses: 2

Pirachai Saenkham (Thai: พีระชัย แสนคำ, pronounced [pʰíːrāʔt͡ɕʰāj˧ sɛ̌ːnkʰām]; born 15 May 1959), known professionally as Kaokor Galaxy (Note: Also written as Khaokor.) (เขาค้อ แกแล็คซี่, [kʰǎwkʰɔ́ː kɛ̄ːlɛ́ksîː]), is a Thai former professional boxer who competed from 1985 to 1989. He held the WBA bantamweight title twice between 1988 and 1989. Khaokor and his twin brother Khaosai Galaxy became the first twins to win a boxing world title.

== Personal life ==
Khaokor Galaxy was born as "Surote Saenkham" (Thai: สุโรจน์ แสนคำ, nicknamed: Rote) (Note: Later, he changed his name to Virote Saenkham (วิโรจน์ แสนคำ)) and raised in Ban Chaliang Lab, Tambon Na Pha, Mueang Phetchabun, Phetchabun, Thailand. Although he was born after Khaosai, he was considered by the Thai as the elder brother because of their ancient belief regarding twins.

Khaokor graduated at Phetchabun Technical College same as Khaosai. Khaokor and Khaosai always liked boxing and fighting since they were children. Their parents bought them their first Muay Thai gloves. Their parents eventually took them to meet their first Muay Thai trainers, Prakan Vornsiri and Mana Lhawpradit.

Khaokor was ring named as Denja Mueangsritep (Thai: เด่นจ๋า เมืองศรีเทพ) for a Muay Thai competition, which is related to Khaosai's ring name, Dawden Mueangsritep (Thai: ดาวเด่น เมืองศรีเทพ). Both of them competed around Phetchabun and the nearby provinces. Khaokor started joining competitions before Khaosai and would use his twin brother's name. Niwat Lhawsuwanwat (Thai: นิวัฒน์ เหล่าสุวรรณวัฒน์) would take them to Bangkok for a professional training program and later, joined many competitions in Bangkok.

== Professional career ==
Like his brother, he started his career in Muay Thai and would later switch to boxing. In fact, he had been fighting Muay Thai for many years before Khaosai. After becoming a star in Thailand, he followed a long-standing Thai custom of adopting an attention-getting ringname and thus he became known as Khaokor Galaxy (Thai: เขาค้อ แกแล็คซี่) after Khaokor, a renowned natural tourist attraction at his birthplace. His transition to boxing came after he became a sparring partner and mentor to Khaosai. At that time, he had been out of Muay Thai for seven years and had no intention of going back to fighting, whether it was Muay Thai or boxing. However, Niwat Laosuwanwat, Khaosai's manager and promoter, saw his potential and invited him to try boxing, hoping to make them the world's first twin world champions. Khaokor Galaxy made his professional boxing début in 1985, winning his first seven fights before capturing the Thailand bantamweight title in July 1986.

On 9 May 1988, he won against Wilfredo Vazquez to take the WBA bantamweight title. With this victory, the Galaxy brothers became the first twins to be world champions. Khaokor would also be the first Thai bantamweight champion.

After Khaokor and Khaosai won their titles, Tam Pai Doo, a variety TV show on Channel 9, organized an exhibition bout that pitted the twins against each other, the contest was produced at Rajadamnern Stadium, Bangkok. Khaosai beat Khaokor by points in three rounds.

Khaokor lost the title three months later in his first defense against Korean Sung-Kil Moon, when an accidental clash of heads caused a sixth-round stoppage with Khaokor behind on points. He bounced back with five straight wins to earn a rematch with Moon on 9 July 1989. Khaokor won the rematch easily, winning in all 12 rounds on two scorecards and 11 on the third scorecard. Once again though, Khaokor lost the title in his first defence three months later, against Luisito Espinosa. Surprisingly, he retired at that point with a record of 24 wins and 2 losses. The defeat to Espinosa was unexpected, but Khaokor was caught with a left hook, and about 20 seconds later just collapsed out of thin air. At that time, this matter was a huge sensation in society, it was called Rok-wubb (โรควูบ, "fainting syndrome"). There was a lot of discussion about it, some people thought that he was being attacked by black magic from his ex-girlfriend. After retirement, Khaokor revealed that it was because he had lost a lot of weight at that time, coupled with stress, that caused it to happen.

== Boxing style ==
Although they were twins, his fighting style was completely different from Khaosai. Kaokor fought with a technical and tactical approach, relying on timing and observing his opponent’s movements closely. In contrast, Khaosai used an aggressive approach known as the "fighting style," characterized by relentless attacks. In terms of training and discipline, he admitted that he had been lazy in practice, while Khaosai was more determined and diligent in his training.

== Retirement ==
Two months after Khaokor lost his title, the twins had a fan meeting event in Phetchabun. While driving home, they had a car accident which was driven by Khaosai. Khaokor was sent to the ICU for 21 days while, Khaosai only suffered minor injuries and would later be back to professional boxing.

Khaokor decided to retire after his recovery from the car accident but still helped Khaosai in his trainings. When Khaosai decided to retire, Khaokor went back to look after his business full-time, a snooker club.

In his retirement, he got a film job as a main actor for a low-budget Thai movie titled "My name is..Mahingsa" (Thai: ข้าชื่อ..มหิงสา). He was also a boxing trainer for Siriporn Thaweesuk (Thai: ศิริพร ทวีสุข), the first female Thai professional boxing champion. Khaokor had many businesses such as a snooker club, selling car roof accessories, and a restaurant in Bangkok. He also used to work as a recreation attendant for the Phetchabun Government and also worked in a pawnshop.

He would later be broke after poor financial activities such as spending a lot of money with his ex-girlfriends. Although he got broke, he still got many opportunities in getting jobs and eventually settled in. Currently, Khaokor married Tak Jirapwan (Thai: แต๊ก จีรวรรณ) and have two sons, with four years age difference.

== Professional boxing record ==
| 26 fights | 24 wins | 2 losses |
|---|---|---|
| By knockout | 19 | 1 |
| By decision | 5 | 1 |

| No. | Result | Record | Opponent | Type | Round, time | Date | Location | Notes |
|---|---|---|---|---|---|---|---|---|
| 26 | Loss | 24–2 | Luisito Espinosa | KO | 1 (12), 2:13 | 18 Oct 1989 | Rajadamnern Stadium, Bangkok, Thailand | Lost WBA bantamweight title |
| 25 | Win | 24–1 | Moon Sung-kil | UD | 12 | 9 Jul 1989 | Rajadamnern Stadium, Bangkok, Thailand | Won WBA bantamweight title |
| 24 | Win | 23–1 | Speedy Kikuchi | KO | 4 (10) | 24 Apr 1989 | Bangkok, Thailand | |
| 23 | Win | 22–1 | Noel Cornelio | KO | 3 (10) | 19 Feb 1989 | Bangkok, Thailand | |
| 22 | Win | 21–1 | Bae Duk-hwan | KO | 3 (10) | 15 Jan 1989 | Crocodile Farm, Samut Prakan, Thailand | |
| 21 | Win | 20–1 | Jorge Rodriguez | KO | 8 (?) | 9 Nov 1988 | Rajadamnern Stadium, Bangkok, Thailand | |
| 20 | Win | 19–1 | John Matienza | KO | 3 (?) | 12 Sep 1988 | Bangkok, Thailand | |
| 19 | Loss | 18–1 | Moon Sung-kil | TD | 6 (12), 0:39 | 14 Aug 1988 | New Lamada Renaissance Hotel, Seoul, South Korea | Lost WBA bantamweight title |
| 18 | Win | 18–0 | Wilfredo Vázquez | SD | 12 | 9 May 1988 | Hua Mark Indoor Stadium, Bangkok, Thailand | Won WBA bantamweight title |
| 17 | Win | 17–0 | Cho Doo-bok | KO | 2 (10) | 14 Dec 1987 | Rajadamnern Stadium, Bangkok, Thailand | |
| 16 | Win | 16–0 | Constancio Dangla | KO | 4 (10) | 12 Oct 1987 | Rajadamnern Stadium, Bangkok, Thailand | |
| 15 | Win | 15–0 | Russell Finn | KO | 3 (10) | 6 Sep 1987 | Bangkok, Thailand | |
| 14 | Win | 14–0 | Tony Pruitt | KO | 2 (10) | 25 Jun 1987 | Bangkok, Thailand | |
| 13 | Win | 13–0 | Ben Capagnan | KO | 6 (10) | 17 May 1987 | Bangkok, Thailand | |
| 12 | Win | 12–0 | Cha Young-man | KO | 6 (10) | 5 Apr 1987 | Pattaya, Thailand | |
| 11 | Win | 11–0 | Keiichi Ozaki | PTS | 10 | 14 Jan 1987 | Bangkok, Thailand | |
| 10 | Win | 10–0 | Singnoi Singkrungthon | KO | 5 (10) | 28 Sep 1986 | Bangkok, Thailand | Retained Thai bantamweight title |
| 9 | Win | 9–0 | Nakarat Kiatsonthaya | TKO | 5 (10) | 3 Aug 1986 | Rajadamnern Stadium, Bangkok, Thailand | |
| 8 | Win | 8–0 | Kwangthongnoi Sithamnuay | TKO | 4 (10) | 9 Jul 1986 | Bangkok, Thailand | Won Thai bantamweight title |
| 7 | Win | 7–0 | Rakchai Kiatsontaya | KO | 5 (6) | 11 Jun 1986 | Bangkok, Thailand | |
| 6 | Win | 6–0 | Nakarat Kiatsonthaya | PTS | 6 | 26 Mar 1986 | Bangkok, Thailand | |
| 5 | Win | 5–0 | Panchai Kiatsontaya | KO | 2 (10) | 19 Feb 1986 | Bangkok, Thailand | |
| 4 | Win | 4–0 | Man Sorchitpatana | KO | 4 (6) | 8 Jan 1986 | Rajadamnern Stadium, Bangkok, Thailand | |
| 3 | Win | 3–0 | Rakchai Kiatsontaya | PTS | 6 | 27 Nov 1985 | Bangkok, Thailand | |
| 2 | Win | 2–0 | Kiatchai Kiatsontaya | KO | 3 (6) | 30 Oct 1985 | Bangkok, Thailand | |
| 1 | Win | 1–0 | Kwannarong Sawatwaree | KO | 3 (6) | 9 Oct 1985 | Bangkok, Thailand | |

== Notes ==
Sporting positions
World boxing titles
| Preceded by Wilfredo Vázquez | WBA bantamweight champion 9 May 1988 – 14 August 1988 | Succeeded by Moon Sung-kil |
| Preceded by Moon Sung-kil | WBA bantamweight champion 9 July 1989 – 18 October 1989 | Succeeded by Luisito Espinosa |
