= Sugar Baby Rojas =

Colombian boxer (born 1961)

Personal information
- Nationality: Colombian
- Born: Bebis Jose Rojas; January 2, 1961 (age 65) Barranquilla, Colombia
- Height: 5 ft 7 in / 170cm
- Weight: Super flyweight

Boxing career
- Stance: Orthodox

Boxing record
- Total fights: 46
- Wins: 37
- Win by KO: 22
- Losses: 9
- Draws: 1
- No contests: 0

Sugar Baby Rojas (born January 2, 1961), is a Colombian professional boxer who held the lineal and WBC super flyweight titles.

== World championship ==
On August 8, 1987, Rojas won the lineal and WBC super flyweight championship of the world by defeating Santos Laciar of Argentina via a unanimous decision.

== Professional boxing record ==
46 fights	37 wins	8 losses
By knockout	22	0
By decision	15	8
Draws	1	

No.	Result	Record	Opponent	Type	Round, time	Date	Location	Notes
46	Loss	37–8–1	Philip Holiday	UD	10	20 Nov 1993	Carousel Casino, Temba, South Africa	
45	Loss	37–7–1	Tom Johnson	UD	12	11 Sep 1993	Jai Alai Fronton, Miami, Florida, U.S.	For IBF featherweight title
44	Win	37–6–1	Benito Rodríguez	UD	12	3 Apr 1993	Jai Alai Fronton, Miami, Florida, U.S.	Retained IBF Inter-Continental featherweight title
43	Win	36–6–1	Cedric Mingo	MD	12	21 Nov 1992	Jai Alai Fronton, Miami, Florida, U.S.	Won IBF Inter-Continental featherweight title
42	Loss	35–6–1	Kennedy McKinney	UD	12	9 Feb 1992	Harrah's Casino Hotel, Atlantic City, New Jersey, U.S.	Lost IBF-USBA super-bantamweight title
41	Win	35–5–1	Jerome Coffee	UD	12	23 Nov 1991	Jai Alai Fronton, Miami, Florida, U.S.	Won vacant IBF-USBA super-bantamweight title
40	Loss	34–5–1	Welcome Ncita	SD	12	28 Sep 1991	Superbowl, Sun City, South Africa	For IBF super-bantamweight title
39	Loss	34–4–1	Welcome Ncita	SD	12	27 Feb 1991	Casino de la Vallee, Saint-Vincent, Italy	For IBF super-bantamweight title
38	Win	34–3–1	Amos Cowart	KO	3, 2:55	11 Sep 1990	Jai Alai Fronton, Miami, Florida, U.S.	
37	Win	33–3–1	Luigi Camputaro	TKO	8 (12), 1:54	27 Apr 1990	Trump Castle, Atlantic City, New Jersey, U.S.	Won vacant WBA Inter-Continental bantamweight title
36	Win	32–3–1	Javier Guido	TKO	5 (10)	12 Jan 1990	Jai Alai Fronton, Miami, Florida, U.S.	
35	Win	31–3–1	Angel Sanchez	KO	2	27 Oct 1989	Holiday Inn, Plantation, Florida, U.S.	
34	Loss	30–3–1	José Ruíz Matos	UD	12	29 Apr 1989	Coliseo Roberto Clemente, San Juan, Puerto Rico	For inaugural WBO super-flyweight title
33	Loss	30–2–1	Gilberto Román	UD	12	7 Nov 1988	Caesars Palace, Paradise, Nevada, U.S.	For WBC super-flyweight title
32	Loss	30–1–1	Gilberto Román	UD	12	8 Apr 1988	Convention Center, Miami Beach, Florida, U.S.	Lost WBC super-flyweight title
31	Win	30–0–1	Gustavo Ballas	TKO	4 (12), 2:39	24 Oct 1987	Tamiami Fairgrounds Auditorium, Miami, Florida, U.S.	Retained WBC super-flyweight title
30	Win	29–0–1	Santos Laciar	UD	12	8 Jul 1987	Tamiami Fairgrounds Auditorium, Miami, Florida, U.S.	Won WBC super-flyweight title
29	Win	28–0–1	Jesse Williams	PTS	10	15 Nov 1986	Estadio Metropolitano, Barranquilla, Colombia	
28	Win	27–0–1	Rafael Orono	UD	10	11 Jul 1986	Tamiami Fairgrounds Auditorium, Miami, Florida, U.S.	
27	Win	26–0–1	Juan Pagan	KO	2 (8), 2:08	30 May 1986	Tamiami Fairgrounds Auditorium, Miami, Florida, U.S.	
26	Win	25–0–1	Armando Acuna	KO	2	26 Apr 1986	Miami Beach, Florida, U.S.	
25	Draw	24–0–1	Juan Polo Pérez	PTS	10	20 Jul 1985	Plaza de Toros de Cartagena de Indias, Cartagena, Colombia	
24	Win	24–0	Lee Cargle	TKO	7 (10), 2:47	24 May 1985	Tamiami Fairgrounds Auditorium, Miami, Florida, U.S.	
23	Win	23–0	Nelson García	TKO	3 (10), 2:33	12 Feb 1985	Convention Center, Miami Beach, Florida, U.S.	
22	Win	22–0	Jose Luis Garcia	KO	4 (10)	28 Sep 1984	Convention Center, Miami Beach, Florida, U.S.	
21	Win	21–0	Felipe Mojica	KO	8 (10)	17 Apr 1984	Jai Alai Fronton, Miami, Florida, U.S.	
20	Win	20–0	Rudy Crawford	TKO	6 (10)	13 Mar 1984	Jai Alai Fronton, Miami, Florida, U.S.	
19	Win	19–0	Néstor Obregón	KO	8	27 Jan 1984	Barranquilla, Atlántico, Department, Colombia	
18	Win	18–0	Norgie Castro	TKO	8 (10)	26 Nov 1983	Jai Alai Fronton, Miami, Florida, U.S.	
17	Win	17–0	Alfonso López	UD	12	29 Jul 1983	Jai Alai Fronton, Miami, Florida, U.S.	
16	Win	16–0	Steve Whetstone	RTD	7 (10)	10 Jun 1983	Jai Alai Fronton, Miami, Florida, U.S.	Won inaugural Florida State super-flyweight title
15	Win	15–0	Juan Manuel Ortiz	KO	3 (10)	29 Apr 1983	Jai Alai Fronton, Miami, Florida, U.S.	
14	Win	14–0	Enrique Guadamuz	KO	3 (10)	8 Apr 1983	Jai Alai Fronton, Miami, Florida, U.S.	
13	Win	13–0	Johnny Jackson	KO	2 (10), 1:20	11 Mar 1983	Jai Alai Fronton, Miami, Florida, U.S.	
12	Win	12–0	Alfonso López	PTS	10	18 Dec 1982	Plaza Monumental, Cartagena, Colombia	
11	Win	11–0	Gabriel Sepúlveda	RTD	9 (12)	19 Nov 1982	Jai Alai Fronton, Miami, Florida, U.S.	Won vacant WBC FECARBOX flyweight title
10	Win	10–0	José Antonio Badilla	KO	5 (8)	31 Oct 1982	Convention Center, Miami Beach, Florida, U.S.	
9	Win	9–0	Ramón L Pérez	KO	7	2 Oct 1982	Convention Center, Miami Beach, Florida, U.S.	
8	Win	8–0	Rodolfo Flores	PTS	10	6 Aug 1982	Coliseo Humberto Perea, Barranquilla, Colombia	
7	Win	7–0	Bernardo González	KO	4	14 May 1982	Barranquilla, Atlántico Department, Colombia	
6	Win	6–0	Rafael Julio	PTS	10	15 Jan 1982	Cartagena, Bolívar Department, Colombia	
5	Win	5–0	Francisco Quiroz	PTS	10	30 Oct 1981	Coliseo Humberto Perea, Barranquilla, Colombia	
4	Win	4–0	Virgilio Palomo	PTS	10	18 Sep 1981	Coliseo El Campín, Bogotá, Colombia	
3	Win	3–0	Alfredo Gómez	PTS	6	17 Jul 1981	Coliseo Humberto Perea, Barranquilla, Colombia	
2	Win	2–0	William Velasquez	PTS	4	26 Jun 1981	Coliseo Humberto Perea, Barranquilla, Colombia	
1	Win	1–0	Wilfredo Ruiz	PTS	6	13 Feb 1981	Coliseo Humberto Perea, Barranquilla, Colombia	

== See also ==
- List of super-flyweight boxing champions

Achievements
Preceded by Santos Laciar	WBC super flyweight champion August 8, 1987 – April 8, 1988	Succeeded by Gilberto Román
Preceded by Santos Laciar	Lineal super-flyweight champion August 8, 1987 – April 8, 1988	Succeeded by Gilberto Román
