= Eddie Cook (boxer) =

American boxer

Personal information
- Born: Eddie Lee Cook; December 21, 1966 (age 59) St. Louis, Missouri, USA
- Height: 5 ft 3 in (160 cm)
- Weight: Bantamweight; Super bantamweight

Boxing career
- Stance: Southpaw

Boxing record
- Total fights: 22
- Wins: 19
- Win by KO: 16
- Losses: 3
- Draws: 0
- No contests: 0

Eddie Cook (born December 21, 1966, in St. Louis, US ) is a former American boxer.

== Boxing career ==
Cook turned professional in 1990 and won 15 consecutive fights before tasting defeat for the first time against Filipino fighter Dadoy Andujar. On March 15, 1992, he boxed against Israel Contreras for the WBA world title and won by Knockout in the 5th round. He lost the belt in his first title defense in October of the same year to Jorge Eliecer Julio on points. He retired In 1994 after losing to future hall of famer Marco Antonio Barrera.

== See also ==
- List of bantamweight boxing champions

Achievements
Preceded by Israel Contreras	WBA bantamweight champion March 15, 1992 - October 9, 1992	Succeeded by Jorge Eliécer Julio
