= Moon Sung-kil =

South Korean boxer (born 1963)

Personal information
- Born: Moon Sung-kil; July 20, 1963 (age 63) Yeongam, South Jeolla South Korea
- Height: 5 ft 5 in (165 cm)
- Weight: Super-flyweight; Bantamweight

Korean name
- Hangul: 문성길
- RR: Mun Seonggil
- MR: Mun Sŏnggil

Boxing career
- Reach: 66 in (168 cm)
- Stance: Orthodox

Boxing record
- Total fights: 22
- Wins: 20
- Win by KO: 15
- Losses: 2
Medal record
Representing South Korea
World Amateur Championships
Gold medal – first place	1986 Reno	Bantamweight
World Cup
Gold medal – first place	1985 Seoul	Bantamweight
Asian Games
Gold medal – first place	1982 New Delhi	Bantamweight
Gold medal – first place	1986 Seoul	Bantamweight

Moon Sung-kil (Korean: 문성길; born July 20, 1963) is a South Korean former professional boxer who competed from 1987 to 1993. He is a world champion in two weight classes, having held the World Boxing Association (WBA) bantamweight title from 1988 to 1989 and the World Boxing Council (WBC) super-flyweight title from 1990 to 1993. His name is also rendered Sung Kil Moon.

== Amateur career ==
Moon, who compiled a purported record of 219–22 (164 KO) during his amateur career, was known as a great knockout puncher of the lighter divisions. In 1982, he won the bantamweight gold medal at the Asian Games in New Delhi, knocking out Wanchai Pongsri of Thailand with one blow in the final.

In the 1984 Summer Olympics, Moon was eliminated in the quarterfinals by Pedro Nolasco via RSC in the first round due to a cut on his head after an accidental head butt.

In March 1985, Moon defeated future WBC Super Bantamweight champion Paul Banke by a third round referee stopped contest (RSC) at the USA-Korea Amateur Boxing Championships held in Las Vegas, Nevada.

In November 1985, Moon won the gold medal at the Boxing World Cup, manhandling all the opponents by KO.

In 1986, Moon became the first South Korean amateur boxer to win a gold medal at the World Amateur Boxing Championships, beating future Olympic silver medalists Aleksandar Hristov and Arnaldo Mesa in the tourney.

== Professional career ==
Moon's pro debut took place on March 8, 1987 with a first-round KO over Ric Bajelot, a fighter with 16 professional fights at the time. Moon won his first six fights by knock-out, before challenging Khaokor Galaxy for the WBA bantamweight title on August 14, 1988. Moon won a six-round technical decision to win the title. The fight was stopped early due to an accidental headbutt that cut Moon.

Moon would go on to make two successful defenses of his title, scoring a seventh-round KO of Edgar Omar Monserrat, and a fifth-round KO of Chiaki Kobayashi. Kobayashi, a former Japanese National Bantamweight Champion, retired after this defeat.

On July 9, 1989, Moon and Galaxy faced off again in a rematch, with Galaxy securing a unanimous decision victory over 12 rounds to reclaim his WBA bantamweight title. Moon suffered two knockdowns in the 11th round, ultimately losing by scores of 120–109, 120–109, and 120–112.

Moon then moved down in weight. Moon scored a second-round KO over Romeo Opriasa in a tune-up bout, before challenging Nana Konadu on January 20, 1990 for the WBC and Lineal super-flyweight title. The fight between Moon and Konadu was a war, both fighters were knocked down several times. Moon won a ninth-round technical decision to capture the title, after once again becoming the victim of an accidental headbutt. Moon won by scores of 86–84, 86–82, and 87–84 to capture his second world title in his second division.

Moon would go on to record nine successful title defenses, including five victories over prior or future world champions. These victories included a ninth-round KO over former two-time WBC and Lineal super-flyweight Champion Gilberto Roman, a fourth-round KO over Konadu in their rematch, and a first-round KO over former two-time WBC light-flyweight and former WBA flyweight champion Hilario Zapata.

On July 3, 1993, Moon made his ninth and final successful title defense, scoring a 12-round majority decision over future IBF super-flyweight and WBO flyweight champion Carlos Gabriel Salazar.

On November 13, 1993 Moon lost a split decision to Jose Luis Bueno by scores of 115–114, 112–117 and 110–118 to lose the WBC super-flyweight Title. Sung-Kil Moon retired after this fight, finishing with professional record of 20 wins and two losses (15 by knockout).

== Professional boxing record ==
22 fights	20 wins	2 losses
By knockout	15	0
By decision	5	2

No.	Result	Record	Opponent	Type	Round, time	Date	Location	Notes
22	Loss	20–2	José Luis Bueno	SD	12	Nov 13, 1993	Pohang Gymnasium, Pohang, South Korea	Lost WBC super-flyweight title
21	Win	20–1	Carlos Salazar	SD	12	Jul 3, 1993	Education Culture Center, Seoul, South Korea	Retained WBC super-flyweight title
20	Win	19–1	Hilario Zapata	TKO	1 (12), 2:54	Feb 27, 1993	Olympic Fencing Stadium, Seoul, South Korea	Retained WBC super-flyweight title
19	Win	18–1	Greg Richardson	MD	12	Oct 31, 1992	Olympic Fencing Stadium, Seoul, South Korea	Retained WBC super-flyweight title
18	Win	17–1	Armando Salazar	TKO	8 (12), 2:59	Jul 4, 1992	Citizen Hall, Incheon, South Korea	Retained WBC super-flyweight title
17	Win	16–1	Torsak Pongsupa	TKO	6 (12), 1:48	Dec 22, 1991	Incheon Gymnasium, Incheon, South Korea	Retained WBC super-flyweight title
16	Win	15–1	Ernesto Ford	KO	5 (12), 2:35	Jul 20, 1991	Ramada Renaissance Hotel, Seoul, South Korea	Retained WBC super-flyweight title
15	Win	14–1	Nana Konadu	TKO	4 (12), 2:55	Mar 16, 1991	Pabellón Principe Felipe, Zaragosa, Spain	Retained WBC super-flyweight title
14	Win	13–1	Kenji Matsumura	TD	5 (12), 3:00	Oct 20, 1990	Hanyang University Gymnasium, Seoul, South Korea	Retained WBC super-flyweight title; Unanimous TD: Moon cut from an accidental head clash
13	Win	12–1	Gilberto Román	RTD	8 (12), 3:00	Jun 9, 1990	Palpal Gymnasium, Seoul, South Korea	Retained WBC super-flyweight title
12	Win	11–1	Nana Konadu	TD	9 (12)	Jan 20, 1990	World Trade Center, Seoul, South Korea	Won WBC super-flyweight title; Unanimous TD: Moon cut from an accidental head clash
11	Win	10–1	Romeo Opriasa	KO	5 (10), 2:23	Nov 19, 1989	Kunsan, South Korea	
10	Loss	9–1	Kaokor Galaxy	UD	12	Jul 9, 1989	Rajadamnern Stadium, Bangkok, Thailand	Lost WBA bantamweight title
9	Win	9–0	Chiaki Kobayashi	TKO	5 (12), 2:28	Feb 19, 1989	Chungmu Gymnasium, Daejeon, South Korea	Retained WBA bantamweight title
8	Win	8–0	Edgar Monserrat	TKO	7 (12), 0:44	Nov 17, 1988	Chamsil Gymnasium, Seoul, South Korea	Retained WBA bantamweight title
7	Win	7–0	Kaokor Galaxy	TD	6 (12), 0:20	Aug 14, 1988	New Lamada Renaissance Hotel, Seoul, South Korea	Won WBA bantamweight title; Unanimous TD: Moon cut from an accidental head clash
6	Win	6–0	Oky Pretus	KO	4 (10), 1:58	Jun 5, 1988	KBS Hall, Ulsan, South Korea	
5	Win	5–0	Tony Pruitt	KO	3 (10), 0:45	Feb 21, 1988	88 Gymnasium, Seoul, South Korea	
4	Win	4–0	Tepratum Eakchatchingchai	KO	2 (10), 2:25	Dec 11, 1987	Jonghab Gymnasium, Gwangju City, South Korea	
3	Win	3–0	Constancio Dangla	KO	3 (10), 0:20	Aug 16, 1987	Mokpo, South Korea	
2	Win	2–0	Singnoi Singkrungthon	KO	3 (10), 2:51	May 17, 1987	Gudeok Gymnasium, Seoul, South Korea	
1	Win	1–0	Ric Bajelot	KO	4 (8), 2:40	Mar 8, 1987	Chamsil Gymnasium, Seoul, South Korea	

== Titles in boxing ==
=== Major world titles ===
- WBC super-flyweight champion (115 lbs)
- WBA bantamweight champion (118 lbs)

== Personal life ==
He spent six months in prison for molesting a woman.

== See also ==
- List of super-flyweight boxing champions
- List of bantamweight boxing champions

Sporting positions
Regional boxing titles
Preceded by Kaokor Galaxy	WBA bantamweight champion August 14, 1988 – July 9, 1989	Succeeded by Kaokor Galaxy
Preceded by Nana Konadu	WBC super flyweight champion January 20, 1990 – November 13, 1993	Succeeded by José Luis Bueno
