= Nana Konadu =

Ghanaian boxer

Nana Yaw Konadu
Personal information
- Nickname: The Ashanti Warrior
- Born: Nana Yaw Konadu Yeboah; 15 February 1964 (age 62) Sunyani, Ghana
- Height: 5 ft 6 1/2 in (169 cm)
- Weight: Flyweight; Super-flyweight; Bantamweight; Featherweight

Boxing career
- Reach: 68 in (173 cm)
- Stance: Orthodox

Boxing record
- Total fights: 47
- Wins: 41
- Win by KO: 32
- Losses: 5
- Draws: 1

Nana Yaw Konadu Yeboah (born February 15, 1964) is a Ghanaian former professional boxer who competed from 1985 to 2001. He is a world champion in two weight classes, having held the World Boxing Council (WBC) super-flyweight title from 1989 to 1990, and the World Boxing Association (WBA) bantamweight title twice between 1996 and 1998.

== Professional career ==
Konadu made his professional debut on May 5, 1985. In his 15th professional bout, he defeated former champion Cesar Polanco to capture the WBC International super flyweight title.

=== WBC super-flyweight Title ===
On November 7, 1989, Konadu captured the WBC and Lineal Super Flyweight Title with a decision win over two-time champion Gilberto Roman. He lost the belt in his first defense to Sung Kil Moon by technical decision. The fight was a war with both fighters exchanging knockdowns, however, the action was stopped in the ninth round due to a headbutt and Moon was declared the winner on the scorecards. He lost a rematch to Moon in 1991 by knockout.

=== WBA bantamweight title ===
Konadu scored 15 consecutive victories over the next four years, including wins over Juan Polo Perez, former champion Victor Rabanales, and Abraham Torres. On January 28, 1996, he became a two-division champion by capturing the WBA Bantamweight Title in a TKO victory over Veeraphol Sahaprom, who would go on to become a long-reigning champion. He again lost the belt in his first defense to Daorung Chuvatana by a technical decision but recaptured the belt the following year in a rematch. He defended the belt once before losing it to Johnny Tapia in 1998. He rebounded with a win over former champion Hector Acero Sanchez and retired in 2001 after being TKO'd by Daniel Seda. He now lives with his family in New Dormaa, Sunyani, Ghana.

== Professional boxing record ==
47 fights	41 wins	5 losses
By knockout	32	2
By decision	8	3
By disqualification	1	0
Draws	1	

No.	Result	Record	Opponent	Type	Round, time	Date	Location	Notes
47	Loss	41–5–1	Daniel Seda	TKO	9 (12), 3:00	12 May 2001	Madison Square Garden, New York City, New York, U.S.	For WBA Fedelatin featherweight title
46	Win	41–4–1	Amadro Vazquez	TKO	5 (8), 0:45	2 Dec 2000	Mandalay Bay Resort & Casino, Las Vegas, Nevada, U.S.	
45	Win	40–4–1	Hector Acero Sanchez	PTS	10	12 Jun 1999	Shriners Auditorium, Wilmington, Massachusetts, U.S.	
44	Loss	39–4–1	Johnny Tapia	MD	12	5 Dec 1998	Convention Center, Atlantic City, New Jersey, U.S.	Lost WBA bantamweight title
43	Win	39–3–1	Julio Cesar Alfaro	DQ	8 (10), 2:19	30 May 1998	Las Vegas Hilton, Las Vegas, Nevada, U.S.	Retained WBA bantamweight title; Alfaro disqualified after his trainer entered the ring
42	Win	38–3–1	Abraham Torres	KO	2 (12), 2:50	21 Feb 1998	Estadio Polideportivo, Mar del Plata, Buenos Aires, Argentina	Retained WBA bantamweight title
41	Win	37–2–1	Daorung Chuvatana	TKO	7 (12), 2:20	21 Jun 1996	Sun Dome, Tampa, Florida, U.S.	Won WBA bantamweight title
40	Loss	36–3–1	Daorung Chuvatana	TD	8 (12), 3:00	27 Oct 1996	Laplae, Thailand	Lost WBA bantamweight title
39	Win	36–2–1	Veeraphol Sahaprom	TKO	2 (12), 2:50	28 Jan 1996	Municipal Stadium, Kanchanaburi, Thailand	Won WBA bantamweight title
38	Win	35–2–1	Abraham Torres	KO	6 (12)	27 May 1995	Broward Co Convention Center, Fort Lauderdale, Florida, U.S.	Won WBC FECARBOX bantamweight title
37	Win	34–2–1	Robert Parra	KO	1 (8), 1:43	8 Apr 1995	Caesars Palace, Las Vegas, Nevada, U.S.	
36	Win	33–2–1	Victor Rabanales	UD	10	7 Oct 1994	Salón La Paloma, Barcelona, Spain	
35	Win	32–2–1	Adolfo Castillo	PTS	8	25 Feb 1994	Palma de Mallorca, Islas Baleares, Spain	
34	Win	31–2–1	Marcos Flores	KO	1 (8)	7 Jan 1994	Casino de Mallorca, Palma de Mallorca, Spain	
33	Win	30–2–1	Alejandro Batista	KO	3 (?)	29 Oct 1993	Pabéllon Principe Felipe, Zaragoza, Aragon, Spain	
32	Win	29–2–1	Miguel Santos	KO	1 (?)	3 Jul 1993	Leon, Castilla y León, Spain	
31	Win	28–2–1	Juan Cruz	KO	1 (?)	27 Mar 1993	Zaragoza, Aragon, Spain	
30	Win	27–2–1	Luis Rosario	KO	6 (?)	28 Nov 1992	Polideportivo Parquesur Sport, Leganes, Spain	
29	Win	26–2–1	Luis Ortiz	TKO	4 (?)	20 Aug 1992	Penaranda, Castille y León, Spain	
28	Win	25–2–1	Jose Pagan	KO	1 (?)	17 Jul 1992	Salamanca, Castilla y León, Spain	
27	Win	24–2–1	Luis Ramos	KO	2 (?)	30 May 1992	Oviedo, Principado de Asturias, Spain	
26	Win	23–2–1	Ruben Bautista	TKO	2 (?)	10 Apr 1992	Bilbao, País Vasco, Spain	
25	Win	22–2–1	Angel Rosario	TKO	7 (?)	17 Jan 1992	Bilbao, País Vasco, Spain	
24	Win	21–2–1	Juan Polo Perez	PTS	12	25 Oct 1991	Zaragoza, Aragon, Spain	Won vacant IBC super-flyweight title
23	Loss	20–2–1	Moon Sung-kil	TKO	4 (12), 2:55	16 Mar 1991	Pabellón Príncipe Felipe, Zaragoza, Aragon, Spain	For WBC super-flyweight title
22	Win	20–1–1	Kevin Nwundidwe	KO	2 (?)	15 Dec 1990	Accra, Ghana	
21	Win	19–1–1	Diego Duran	TKO	3 (8)	13 Oct 1990	Entertainment Center, Sydney, Australia	
20	Loss	18–1–1	Moon Sung-kil	TD	9 (12)	20 Jan 1990	World Trade Center, Seoul, South Korea	Lost WBC super-flyweight title
19	Win	18–0–1	Gilberto Román	UD	12	7 Nov 1989	Arena Mexico, Mexico City, Mexico	Won WBC super-flyweight title
18	Win	17–0–1	Park Dae-Yong	KO	2 (12)	26 May 1989	World Trade Center, Singapore	Retained WBC International super-flyweight title
17	Win	16–0–1	Cesar Polanco	PTS	12	11 Mar 1989	Accra Sports Stadium, Accra, Ghana	Won WBC International super-flyweight title
16	Win	15–0–1	Bernard Mukenge	KO	1 (12)	10 Dec 1988	Accra Sports Stadium, Accra, Ghana	Won ABU bantamweight title
15	Win	14–0–1	Rufus Adebayo	KO	1 (?), 0:16	9 Oct 1988	Holy Gardens, Accra, Ghana	
14	Win	13–0–1	Mohammed Alimbey	KO	6 (10)	10 Sep 1988	Princess Cinema Hall, Takoradi, Ghana	
13	Win	12–0–1	Adamu Mohammed	KO	7 (10)	11 Jun 1988	Holy Gardens, Accra, Ghana	
12	Win	11–0–1	Pommy Brown	KO	2 (10)	19 Dec 1987	Accra Sports Stadium, Accra, Ghana	
11	Win	10–0–1	Albert Musankabala	KO	6 (12)	10 Oct 1987	Accra Sports Stadium, Accra, Ghana	Won vacant CBC flyweight title
10	Win	9–0–1	Ramon Pichardo	KO	2 (4)	28 Aug 1987	Showboat Hotel and Casino, Las Vegas, Nevada, U.S.	
9	Win	8–0–1	Dele Mustapha	PTS	10	28 Feb 1987	Lagos, Nigeria	
8	Win	7–0–1	Steve Muchoki	KO	12 (12)	13 Dec 1986	Holy Gardens, Accra, Ghana	Won ABU flyweight title
7	Win	6–0–1	Ray Amoo	TKO	2 (12)	25 Oct 1986	Accra Sports Stadium, Accra, Ghana	Retained West African Boxing Union flyweight title
6	Win	5–0–1	Ramos Agyare	TKO	6 (10)	31 Aug 1986	Holy Gardens, Accra, Ghana	
5	Win	4–0–1	Joe Power	TKO	2 (12)	27 Jun 1986	Prempeh Assembly Hall, Kumasi, Ghana	Retained West African Boxing Union flyweight title
4	Win	3–0–1	Joe Power	TKO	3 (12)	8 Mar 1986	Coronation Park, Sunyani, Ghana	Retained West African Boxing Union flyweight title
3	Win	2–0–1	Flash Conteh	TKO	1 (12)	7 Dec 1985	Accra Sports Stadium, Accra, Ghana	Won vacant West African Boxing Union flyweight title
2	Draw	1–0–1	Michael Ebo Danquah	PTS	8	29 Jun 1985	Accra, Ghana	
1	Win	1–0	George Freeman	PTS	6	25 May 1985	Accra Sports Stadium, Accra, Ghana	

== Titles in boxing ==
=== Major world titles ===
- WBC super-flyweight champion (115 lbs)
- WBA bantamweight champion (118 lbs) (2x)

=== Minor world titles ===
- IBC super-flyweight champion (115 lbs)

=== Regional/International titles ===
- West African Boxing Union flyweight champion (112 lbs)
- ABU flyweight champion (112 lbs)
- CBC flyweight champion (112 lbs)
- WBC International super-flyweight champion (115 lbs)
- ABU bantamweight champion (118 lbs)
- WBC FECARBOX bantamweight champion (118 lbs)

== See also ==
- List of super-flyweight boxing champions
- List of bantamweight boxing champions

Sporting positions
Major world boxing titles
Preceded by Gilberto Román	WBC super-flyweight champion 7 November 1989 – 20 January 1990	Succeeded by Moon Sung-kil
Preceded by Veeraphol Sahaprom	WBA bantamweight champion 28 January – 27 October 1996	Succeeded by Daorung Chuvatana
Preceded by Daorung Chuvatana	WBA bantamweight champion 21 June 1997 – 5 December 1998	Succeeded by Johnny Tapia
