= Jiro Watanabe =

Japanese boxer (born 1955)

Personal information
- Nationality: Japanese
- Born: 渡辺二郎; 16 March 1955 (age 71) Okayama, Japan
- Height: 5 ft 5 1/2 in (166 cm)
- Weight: Super flyweight

Boxing career
- Stance: Southpaw

Boxing record
- Total fights: 28
- Wins: 26
- Win by KO: 17
- Losses: 2
- Draws: 0
- No contests: 0

Jiro Watanabe (渡辺二郎, Watanabe Jirō; born 16 March 1955) is a Japanese former boxer. Watanabe, who fought only in Japan and South Korea, was one of the first World super flyweight champions, as the division was relatively new when he was crowned.

== Biography ==
With a background in Shotokan Karate, he started his professional boxing career with a three-round knockout over Keiza Miyazaki. The fight was in Okayama, Watanabe's birthplace. Two first-round knockout wins followed, one over Yukihiro Kawahira, and another over Noburu Iishi. There was an immediate rematch with Iishi, and, although the second time around Iishi gave him a tougher test, nevertheless, Watanabe still came out a winner, by a knockout in six.

Three more knockouts followed, two in the first round, including one over Koji Kobayashi, future WBC world Flyweight champion and brother of former world champion Royal Kobayashi. Then, Watanabe was taken the distance for the first time, against Jin-Hyun Chun in Nagoya, Watanabe winning a six-round decision.

After two more decision wins, Watanabe flew to South Korea, where he challenged the WBC world Jr. Bantamweight champion Chul-Ho Kim, losing in his first world title bid by a 15-round decision. Watanabe then returned to Japan and won his remaining four bouts for 1981 there, three by knockout. One of the fighters he beat was Tito Abella, who by then had been ranked as the number one Jr. Bantamweight challenger in the world. Abella was knocked out in four rounds.

In April 1982, the WBA Jr. Bantamweight champion of the world, Rafael Pedroza of Panama, the cousin of Eusebio Pedroza, travelled to Osaka to defend his belt against Watanabe on 8 April. Watanabe won a unanimous 15-round decision and became world champion. Watanabe's remaining fights of 1982 were title defenses against former world champions, Gustavo Ballas of Argentina, knocked out in nine rounds, and Shoji Oguma (former two time world Flyweight champion), beaten by a knockout in 12.

1983 was another busy year for the champion: He beat Luis Ibañez by a knockout in eight, Roberto Ramirez of Mexico by a decision in 15, and Soon-Chun Kwon by a technical decision in 11. Watanabe had built a considerable points lead over Kwon, but in round ten, their heads collided, causing a gap in Watanabe's head. He bled profusely, and the fight doctor ordered the fight to be stopped in round eleven, but since it was ruled that the cut was the product of a headbutt, the fight then went to the scorecards, and Watanabe was declared the winner.

In 1984, Watanabe disposed of another Venezuelan challenger, Celso Chavez, by knocking him out in 15 rounds. Then, he and WBC world champion Payao Poontarat met in an attempt to unify the world's Jr. Bantamweight title, and Watanabe finally earned the WBC's belt, winning by a 12-round decision. Although Watanabe didn't become undisputed as he was stripped of the WBA title for refusing to defend his title against his number 1 contender, Khaosai Galaxy. Watanabe also became the first lineal champion in the division. There was an immediate rematch, and Watanabe again imposed his will, with an 11-round knockout over the former world champ.

In 1985, he retained the title with a 12-round decision over Julio Soto Solano. Wins over Katsuo Katsuma (KO 7) and Suk-Hwan Yun (KO 5) followed, but in 1986, he defended against the late Gilberto Roman in what would turn out to be his last fight. He lost to Roman by a 12-round decision and announced his retirement from professional boxing. Unlike so many others, he was able to stay away from the temptation of coming back and trying to regain his old popularity.

Watanabe's successor for the WBA title would be Galaxy. Galaxy would win the vacant title against Eusebio Espinal and also go on to become a Jr. Bantamweight and reel off 19 straight title defenses before retiring.

In 1999, Watanabe was spotted at a Seoul activity honoring Asia's greatest boxing champions, alongside Fighting Harada, Jung-Koo Chang, Yoko Gushiken, Sot Chitalada, and former rivals Chul-Ho Kim and Poontarat, among others.

In August 1995, he was arrested for blackmail. He ran an import business in Osaka, and threatened the debtors by saying that he would beat them to death. Police suspended judgment on the matter, so he was released.

In October 1999, he was arrested for giving a gun to a friend who was prosecuted for murder. In July 2000, he was sentenced to 4 years and 6 months imprisonment.

After being released in 2004, he was arrested for blackmail along with Kenji Haga, ex-actor, and a yakuza of Yamaguchigumi, on 30 June 2007. He has denied the suspicion, but Japan Boxing Commission banished him on 27 July 2007.

== Professional boxing record ==
28 fights	26 wins	2 losses
By knockout	17	0
By decision	9	2

No.	Result	Record	Opponent	Type	Round, time	Date	Location	Notes
28	Loss	26–2	Gilberto Román	UD	12	Mar 30, 1986	Sports Centre, Itami Japan	Lost WBC super-flyweight title
27	Win	26–1	Suk Hwan Yun	TKO	5 (12), 2:34	Dec 13, 1985	Municipal Stadium, Daegu South Korea	Retained WBC super-flyweight title
26	Win	25–1	Kazou Katsuma	TKO	12 (12), 1:26	Sep 17, 1985	Osaka-Jo Hall, Osaka Japan	Retained WBC super-flyweight title
25	Win	24–1	Julio Soto Solano	UD	12	May 9, 1985	Korakuen Hall Japan	Retained WBC super-flyweight title
24	Win	23–1	Payao Poontarat	TKO	11 (12) 1:54	Nov 29, 1984	Prefectural Gymnasium, Kumamoto Japan	Retained WBC super-flyweight title
23	Win	22–1	Payao Poontarat	SD	12	Jul 5, 1984	Osaka-Jo Hall, Osaka Japan	Won WBC super-flyweight title
22	Win	21–1	Celso Chavez	TKO	15 (15)	Mar 15, 1984	Osaka-Jo Hall, Osaka Japan	Retained WBA super-flyweight title
21	Win	20–1	Soon Chun Kwon	TD	11 (12), 3:00	Oct 6, 1983	Prefectural Gymnasium, Osaka Japan	Retained WBA super-flyweight title
20	Win	19–1	Roberto Ramirez	MD	15	Jun 23, 1983	Miyagi Sports Center, Sendai Japan	Retained WBA super-flyweight title
19	Win	18–1	Luis Ibanez	KO	8 (15), 1:22	Feb 14, 1983	Municipal Gym, Tsu Japan	Retained WBA super-flyweight title
18	Win	17–1	Shoji Oguma	TKO	12 (15)	Nov 11, 1982	City Gymnasium, Hamamatsu Japan	Retained WBA super-flyweight title
17	Win	16–1	Gustavo Ballas	RTD	9 (15), 3:00	Jul 29, 1982	Prefectural Gymnasium, Osaka Japan	Retained WBA super-flyweight title
16	Win	15–1	Rafael Pedroza	UD	15	Apr 8, 1982	Prefectural Gymnasium, Osaka Japan	Won WBA super-flyweight title
15	Win	14–1	Tito Abella	KO	4 (10), 1:46	Nov 25, 1981	Prefectural Gymnasium, Osaka Japan	
14	Win	13–1	Ali Baba Lukklongyan	KO	5 (10), 2:25	Oct 10, 1981	Korakuen Hall Japan	
13	Win	12–1	Kwang Suk Lee	UD	10	Aug 9, 1981	Korakuen Hall Japan	
12	Win	11–1	Berlin Olivetti	KO	2 (10), 2:22	Jun 29, 1981	Prefectural Gymnasium, Osaka Japan	
11	Loss	10–1	Chul Ho Kim	UD	15	Apr 22, 1981	Changchung Gymnasium, Seoul South Korea	For WBC super-flyweight title
10	Win	10–0	Phaktai Lipovitan	PTS	10	Dec 15, 1980	Prefectural Gymnasium, Osaka Japan	
9	Win	9–0	Chakhtep Chuwatana	PTS	10	Sep 2, 1980	Korakuen Hall Japan	
8	Win	8–0	Jin Hyun Chan	PTS	6	Jun 14, 1980	Aichi Prefectural Gym, Nagoya Japan	
7	Win	7–0	Koji Kobayashi	KO	1 (6), 2:15	Feb 21, 1980	Prefectural Gymnasium, Osaka Japan	
6	Win	6–0	Yoshihiko Kawahira	KO	4 (6), 1:47	Jan 19, 1980	City Gymnasium, Yokkaichi Japan	
5	Win	5–0	Shinji Takagi	KO	1 (6), 1:46	Dec 1, 1979	Budokan, Okayama City Japan	
4	Win	4–0	Noboru Ishii	KO	6 (6), 2:16	Nov 1, 1979	Prefectural Gymnasium, Osaka Japan	
3	Win	3–0	Noboru Ishii	KO	1 (4), 1:25	Jul 28, 1979	Sakuranomiya Skating Rink, Osaka Japan	
2	Win	2–0	Yoshihiko Kawahira	KO	1 (4), 2:35	May 19, 1979	Suzuyo Gym, Shimizu Japan	
1	Win	1–0	Kiezo Miyazaki	KO	3 (4), 2:50	Mar 27, 1979	Budokan, Okayama City Japan	

== See also ==
- List of super-flyweight boxing champions
- List of Japanese boxing world champions
- Boxing in Japan

Sporting positions
World boxing titles
Preceded by Rafael Pedroza	WBA super-flyweight champion 8 April 1982 – 5 July 1984; Stripped	Vacant Title next held by Khaosai Galaxy
Preceded by Payao Poontarat	WBC super-flyweight champion 5 July 1984 – 30 March 1986	Succeeded by Gilberto Román
