= Chun Ju-do =

South Korean boxer (born 1964)

Personal information
- Nationality: (South Korea) South Korean
- Born: Chun Ju-do; January 25, 1964 (age 62) Gangwon-do, South Korea
- Weight: Super flyweight

Boxing career
- Stance: Orthodox

Boxing record
- Total fights: 27
- Wins: 20
- Win by KO: 11
- Losses: 4
- Draws: 3
- No contests: 0

Chun Ju-do (Korean: 전주도; Hanja: 全周都; born January 25, 1964, in Gangwon Province, South Korea) is a former boxer from South Korea.

== Pro career ==
Chun fought for the inaugural IBF super flyweight title in 1983, winning with a 5th-round TKO over Ken Kasugai in Osaka, Japan. He became the youngest Korean boxer to win a world title, at 19 years and 10 months old, and this record remains unbroken today. He defended the belt five times before losing it to future 3-time IBF super flyweight champion Ellyas Pical in Jakarta, Indonesia in 1985. After two more losses against lackluster competition, Chun retired in 1990.

== Professional boxing record ==
| 27 fights | 20 wins | 4 losses |
|---|---|---|
| By knockout | 11 | 2 |
| By decision | 9 | 2 |
| Draws | 3 | |

| No. | Result | Record | Opponent | Type | Round, time | Date | Location | Notes |
|---|---|---|---|---|---|---|---|---|
| 27 | Loss | 20–4–3 | Kim Hae-il | KO | 7 (8), 2:10 | 30 Dec 1989 | Munhwa Gymnasium, Seoul, South Korea | |
| 26 | Win | 20–3–3 | Jung Kyung-mo | TKO | 3 (8), 0:44 | 25 Nov 1989 | Sajik Gymnasium, Busan, South Korea | |
| 25 | Loss | 19–3–3 | Little Holmes | PTS | 10 | 27 Sep 1986 | Jakarta, Indonesia | |
| 24 | Loss | 19–2–3 | Ellyas Pical | TKO | 8 (15) | 3 May 1985 | Bung Karno Stadium, Jakarta, Indonesia | Lost IBF super-flyweight title |
| 23 | Win | 19–1–3 | Park Kwang-koo | KO | 15 (15), 0:53 | 6 Jan 1985 | Ulsan Gymnasium, Ulsan, South Korea | Retained IBF super-flyweight title |
| 22 | Win | 18–1–3 | William Develos | KO | 7 (15), 2:41 | 20 Jul 1984 | Gudeok Gymnasium, Busan, South Korea | Retained IBF super-flyweight title |
| 21 | Win | 17–1–3 | Felix Marquez | TKO | 6 (15), 0:02 | 26 May 1984 | Chiak Gymnasium, Wonju, South Korea | Retained IBF super-flyweight title |
| 20 | Win | 16–1–3 | Diego De Villa | KO | 1 (15), 2:35 | 17 Mar 1984 | Gwangju Gymnasium, Gwangju, South Korea | Retained IBF super-flyweight title |
| 19 | Win | 15–1–3 | Prayurasak Muangsurin | TKO | 12 (15), 1:09 | 28 Jan 1984 | Munhwa Gymnasium, Seoul, South Korea | Retained IBF super-flyweight title |
| 18 | Win | 14–1–3 | Ken Kasugai | TKO | 5 (15) | 10 Dec 1983 | Osaka-jō Hall, Osaka, Japan | Won inaugural IBF super-flyweight title |
| 17 | Win | 13–1–3 | Yang Hoe-jul | UD | 10 | 23 Oct 1983 | Daegu Gymnasium, Daegu, South Korea | Retained South Korean super-flyweight title |
| 16 | Win | 12–1–3 | Choi Young-kil | KO | 9 (10), 0:50 | 27 Aug 1983 | Daegu Gymnasium, Daegu, South Korea | Retained South Korean super-flyweight title |
| 15 | Win | 11–1–3 | Jung Hee-yun | KO | 4 (10), 2:27 | 26 Jun 1983 | Munhwa Gymnasium, Seoul, South Korea | Won South Korean super-flyweight title |
| 14 | Win | 10–1–3 | Choi Young-kil | PTS | 8 | 14 May 1983 | Munhwa Gymnasium, Seoul, South Korea | |
| 13 | Win | 9–1–3 | Lee Jung-kook | PTS | 8 | 12 Mar 1983 | Masan Gymnasium, Masan, South Korea | |
| 12 | Win | 8–1–3 | Hong Young-chul | PTS | 8 | 5 Feb 1983 | Chungmu Gymnasium, Daejeon, South Korea | |
| 11 | Win | 7–1–3 | Joo Yoo-uk | PTS | 8 | 31 Oct 1982 | Munhwa Gymnasium, Seoul, South Korea | |
| 10 | Draw | 6–1–3 | Joo Moon-kyoon | PTS | 8 | 18 Sep 1982 | Jeonju Gymnasium, Jeonju, South Korea | |
| 9 | Win | 6–1–2 | Choi Kwang-sik | PTS | 6 | 26 Jun 1982 | Munhwa Gymnasium, Seoul, South Korea | |
| 8 | Win | 5–1–2 | Park Kyung-woo | PTS | 4 | 8 May 1982 | Jangchung Gymnasium, Seoul, South Korea | |
| 7 | Win | 4–1–2 | Kim Kwang-soo | KO | 4 (4), 1:07 | 17 Apr 1982 | Yesan University, Yesan, South Korea | |
| 6 | Win | 3–1–2 | Park Kyung-woo | PTS | 4 | 14 Feb 1982 | Chungmu Gymnasium, Daejeon, South Korea | |
| 5 | Win | 2–1–2 | Kang Byung-hee | KO | 1 (4), 1:19 | 22 Sep 1981 | Jangchung Gymnasium, Seoul, South Korea | |
| 4 | Draw | 1–1–2 | Choi Chang-sung | PTS | 4 | 27 Jun 1981 | Gudeok Gymnasium, Busan, South Korea | |
| 3 | Draw | 1–1–1 | Shin Yang-il | PTS | 4 | 7 Jun 1981 | Chungmu Gymnasium, Daejeon, South Korea | |
| 2 | Loss | 1–1 | Choi Young-kil | PTS | 4 | 10 May 1981 | Seoul Stadium, Seoul, South Korea | |
| 1 | Win | 1–0 | Choi Kyu-sang | PTS | 4 | 8 May 1981 | Seoul Stadium, Seoul, South Korea | |

| Preceded by Inaugural Champion | IBF Super Flyweight Champion; 10 December 1983 – 3 May 1985 | Succeeded by Ellyas Pical |
