= Tam Pai Doo =

- Genre: Variety show Light documentary
- Presented by: Songwit Jirasopin
- Narrated by: Wiroj Kwantham
- Country of origin: Thailand
- Original language: Thai
- No. of episodes: 13

Production
- Executive producer: Paiboon Damrongchaitham
- Production location: Thailand
- Running time: 45 minutes (1986–89); 75 minutes (1989–99); 25 minutes (repeat in 2011 on Play Channel)
- Production company: Grammy Entertainment

Original release
- Network: Channel 9 (1986–99); Play Channel (2011)
- Release: March 2, 1986 – 1999

Related
- Ta Pi Sut (Channel 7; produced by Kantana)

Tam Pai Doo (Thai: ตามไปดู; RTGS: Tam Pai Du; lit: Follow to see) is a variety show and light documentary in Thailand produced by Grammy Entertainment and broadcast on Channel 9 on Sunday afternoons in the late 1980s to 1990s, with a 13-years airtime presented by Songwit Jirasopin. It was the first variety show in Thailand.

== Presenters ==
Main presenter

- Songwit Jirasopin

Field presenter/Supporting presenter

- Wiroj Kwantham
- Damrong Puttan
- Sansanee Sitapan Moller
- Ken Streutker
- Morris K.
- Yuwadee Ruangchai
- Numfone Komolthiti
- John Rattanaveroj
- Witsawa Kijtunkajorn
- Wirote Tungvanich
- Jamjuree Cherdchom

== Other media ==
There is a magazine with the same name.

== Awards ==
- TVG.Awards 1987: Best Variety Show
- TVG.Awards 1989: Best Male Presenter
- Mekala Awards 1990: Best Fiction Program
- Mekala Awards 1991: Best Fiction Program
