= Khaosai Galaxy =

Thai boxer (born 1959)

Khaosai Galaxy เขาทราย แกแล็คซี่
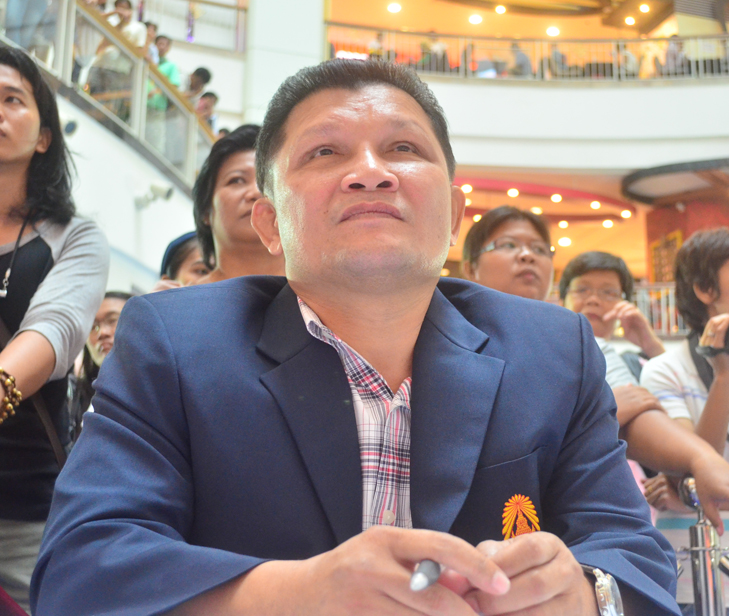
- Khaosai Galaxy in 2012

Personal information
- Nicknames: Sai Thaluang Si (ซ้ายทะลวงไส้) "The Left Hand That Drills Intestines"
- Born: Sura Saenkham; 15 May 1959 (age 67) Ban Cha Lianglab, Tambon Na Pa, Mueang Phetchabun, Phetchabun, Thailand
- Height: 5 ft 5 in (165 cm)
- Weight: Super-flyweight

Boxing career
- Stance: Southpaw

Boxing record
- Total fights: 48
- Wins: 47
- Win by KO: 41
- Losses: 1

Sura Saenkham (Thai: สุระ แสนคำ; born 15 May 1959), known professionally as Khaosai Galaxy (Thai: เขาทราย แกแล็คซี่, pronounced [kʰǎwsāːj kɛ̄ːlɛ́k̚sîː]) is a Thai former professional boxer and Muay Thai fighter who competed between 1980 and 1991. He held the World Boxing Association (WBA) super-flyweight title from 1984 and 1991. Khaosai and his twin brother Khaokor Galaxy became the first twins to win a boxing world title.

He is listed #19 on Ring Magazine's list of 100 greatest punchers of all time and named him the 43rd greatest fighter of the past 80 years in 2002. As of 2022, BoxRec rates him as the best Thai boxer of all time, pound for pound.

== Muay Thai career ==
Khaosai Galaxy, born Sura Saenkham (Thai: สุระ แสนคำ) in Phetchabun province, northern Thailand, began his fighting career as a Muay Thai fighter in the early 1980s. He fought under the ring names Daoden Muangsithep (Thai: ดาวเด่น เมืองศรีเทพ) and Khaosai Wangchomphu. (Thai: เขาทราย วังชมภู). Later, he adopted the name Galaxy from a restaurant and nightclub owned by a friend of his manager.

Renowned for his devastating punching power, especially his soon-to-be-legendary left hand, Khaosai was advised by his manager and trainer to switch to the Marquess of Queensberry rules, and began training in western-style boxing.

He credited his mother as his first trainer. A passionate boxing and Muay Thai fan, she was inspired by the rise of Pone Kingpetch, Thailand's first world champion, who was becoming a national hero around the time Khaosai and his twin brother Kaokor Galaxy were born. Driven by her enthusiasm, she began training her sons from a young age, waking them at 4:00 a.m. to run before school and supporting their boxing journey in every way. Tragically, she died before witnessing Khaosai's rise to world champion.

== Boxing style ==
Lacking the amateur boxing experience common to most Western professional boxers, Khaosai's skills originally were limited, and he relied on toughness and his fearsome punching power to win. His southpaw style was based on closing his opponent and firing his left hand whenever he saw an opening. His right hand was used mainly to judge the distance for his left. He also studied recorded fights of renowned world champions such as Muhammad Ali, Sugar Ray Leonard, and Marvin Hagler, which helped him refine his skills and expand his tactical understanding in the ring.

As he gained experience, Khaosai began to develop into a more refined boxer, learning combination punching to complement his deadly left. His favorite punch, a straight left to the midsection, translates roughly as "the left hand that drills intestines". Incredibly strong, he was never out-muscled, while opponents who tried the traditional stick-and-move techniques found he had quick feet and was able to block their movements.

== Professional boxing career ==
Khaosai began his international style boxing career in December 1980. He won all of his first six fights, which earned him a shot at the Thailand bantamweight (118-pound) title on 1981 against Sakda Saksuree. He lost on a points decision. It was to be the last fight he would ever lose in the ring.

Khaosai won his next three fights and claimed the Thai bantamweight title in 1982. He won 15 consecutive fights by knockout and climbed in the world rankings to become super-flyweight WBA world champion Jiro Watanabe's mandatory challenger by the summer of 1984.

When Watanabe failed to defend his title against Khaosai, the WBA stripped him and matched Khaosai against undefeated Eusebio Espinal for the vacant championship on 1984. Khaosai knocked out Espinal in the sixth round, beginning the longest title reign in his division's history.

Khaosai defended his WBA title 19 times over the next seven years, winning 16 of his title fights by knockouts. In the mid-1980s, when world heavyweight champion Mike Tyson was in his prime and scoring knockouts over everyone, boxing fans nicknamed Khaosai The Thai Tyson for knockout wins.

Khaosai fought only once outside of Asia, when he defended his title in 1986 against unbeaten (and future WBA bantamweight titleholder) Israel Contreras in Curaçao. He had two title fights in Kōbe, Japan, one in South Korea and one at Bung Karno Stadium, Indonesia. The rest were in Thailand, where he often fought for purses in excess of $100,000 in front of huge crowds. That, plus the fact that few top fighters anywhere were willing to challenge Khaosai, made him relatively unknown in the West.

In 1988, his twin younger brother, fighting under the name Kaokhor Galaxy, captured the WBA bantamweight title, making the Galaxy brothers (Saenkham brothers) the first twins to ever be world boxing champions.

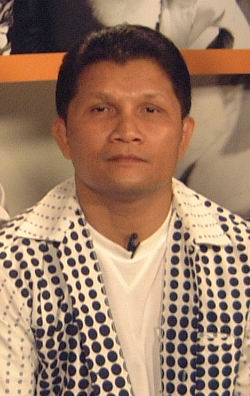
Khaosai Galaxy in 2007

== Retirement ==
He fought for the last time on December 22, 1991, in Bangkok, beating Armando Castro over 12 rounds. A few weeks later, he announced his retirement with a record of 47 wins against only one defeat, and never attempted a comeback.

== Life after boxing ==
Not long after his retirement to the boxing profession, Khaosai chose to take part in the Thai entertainment industry. He first took a shot at the music industry, releasing a single, "Khob Khun Krub", meaning "Thank You", then began taking part in TV series and movies, particularly comedies. His first role as an actor occurred during the TV series Poot Mae Nam Khong (1992 version), which was then followed by Mon Rak Luk Thung (1995 version), The Legend of Suriyothai (2001), and The Bodyguard (2004) etc. In 2005, while he was taking part in a film, he was punched in the face by a drunken fan, who wished to obtain Khaosai's shirt for collection but was denied. The incident made frontline news, which displayed a photo of Khaosai, with a bandage on his face but smiling and standing next to the drunk man.

In 2006, he starred in a music video for a song by fellow boxers Somluck Kamsing and Samart Payakaroon. In the video, Khaosai portrayed a shy man being approached by a young woman.

After retirement, he married Yumiko Ota, a Japanese woman whom he had met during a trip to Kōbe, Japan, for his second fight with Kenji Matsumura in 1989. The couple lived together for only one year before divorcing.

He later married a woman from Buriram, Sureerat "Fah" Saenkham (née Niwesram). Although they had no children together, Khaosai chose to adopt his wife's nephew as his stepchild.

In March 2013, he made headlines again when he unexpectedly married Wannapa "Nung" Kamboonsri before legally divorcing his previous wife. That same year, he became a father for the first time at the age of 54 when his wife gave birth to a daughter. In 2016, they welcomed their second daughter at the end of the year.

Today, Khaosai owns two Muay Thai gyms, one in Bangkok, and another in Phuket. He also served as Denkaosan Kaovichit's trainer for a one-off bout against Takefumi Sakata in late 2008 in Yokohama, Japan. Denkaosan won by knockout in the second round, becoming the next WBA flyweight champion.

Beyond boxing and entertainment, Khaosai has also dabbled in politics. In the 2007 general election, he ran as a party-list candidate for the Puea Pandin Party but was unsuccessful. Later, in the 2011 general election, he ran for Chartthaipattana Party in his native Phetchabun's 2nd district, but garnered only 8,485 votes and did not win the seat.

== Legacy ==
Khaosai's unmatched fame helped spark a tradition unique to Thailand, in which politicians or private companies organized world title boxing matches and allowed the public to attend for free. In exchange, the sponsors received publicity on televised broadcasts, had their names announced, and presented gold necklaces or other gifts to the fighters before the bouts.

This tradition began with his ninth title defense at the Crocodile Farm, Samut Prakan in 1989, against South Korean challenger Chang Tae-il.

Also, it was often said that whenever Khaosai fought, traffic in Bangkok eased, because everyone hurried home to watch him on TV.

He was selected to the International Boxing Hall of Fame (IBHOF) in 1999 and remains a well‑known boxer throughout Thailand. His induction came nearly a decade after his retirement, an exceptional honor for Asian boxer. At the ceremony, fans queued for more than three hours to receive his autograph, and included many supporters who wished to show their respect.

== Professional boxing record ==
48 fights	47 wins	1 loss
By knockout	41	0
By decision	6	1

No.	Result	Record	Opponent	Type	Round, time	Date	Location	Notes
48	Win	47–1	Armando Castro	UD	12	22 Dec 1991	National Stadium, Bangkok, Thailand	Retained WBA super-flyweight title
47	Win	46–1	David Griman	TKO	5 (12)	20 Jul 1991	Crocodile Farm, Samut Prakan, Thailand	Retained WBA super-flyweight title
46	Win	45–1	Je Suk Park	TKO	5 (12)	7 Apr 1991	Samut Songkhram Stadium, Samut Songkhram, Thailand	Retained WBA super-flyweight title
45	Win	44–1	Ernesto Ford	TKO	6 (12)	9 Dec 1990	Provincial Stadium, Phetchabun, Thailand	Retained WBA super-flyweight title
44	Win	43–1	Yong Kang Kim	KO	6 (12)	29 Sep 1990	Suphan Buri Provincial Stadium, Suphan Buri, Thailand	Retained WBA super-flyweight title
43	Win	42–1	Shunichi Nakajima	TKO	8 (12)	30 Jun 1990	Municipality Gymnasium, Chiang Mai, Thailand	Retained WBA super-flyweight title
42	Win	41–1	Ari Blanca	KO	5 (12)	29 Mar 1990	Rajadamnern Stadium, Bangkok, Thailand	Retained WBA super-flyweight title
41	Win	40–1	Kenji Matsumura	TKO	12 (12)	31 Oct 1989	World Memorial Hall, Kobe, Japan	Retained WBA super-flyweight title
40	Win	39–1	Alberto Castro	TKO	10 (12)	29 Jul 1989	Sri Narong Stadium, Surin, Thailand	Retained WBA super-flyweight title
39	Win	38–1	Kenji Matsumura	UD	12	8 Apr 1989	Yokohama Cultural Gymnasium, Yokohama, Japan	Retained WBA super-flyweight title
38	Win	37–1	Chang Tae-il	KO	2 (12)	15 Jan 1989	Crocodile Farm, Samut Prakan, Thailand	Retained WBA super-flyweight title
37	Win	36–1	Choi Chang-ho	TKO	8 (12)	9 Oct 1988	Sheraton Walker Hill Hotel, Seoul, South Korea	Retained WBA super-flyweight title
36	Win	35–1	Jun Llano	KO	3 (10)	12 Sep 1988	Bangkok, Thailand	
35	Win	34–1	Kap Sup Song	KO	7 (10)	9 May 1988	Hua Mark Indoor Stadium, Bangkok, Thailand	
34	Win	33–1	Kongtoranee Payakaroon	UD	12	26 Jan 1988	Lumpinee Boxing Stadium, Bangkok, Thailand	Retained WBA super-flyweight title
33	Win	32–1	Byung-Kwan Chung	TKO	3 (12)	12 Oct 1987	Rajadamnern Stadium, Bangkok, Thailand	Retained WBA super-flyweight title
32	Win	31–1	Chung Sup Chun	KO	3 (10)	26 Jun 1987	Bangkok, Thailand	
31	Win	30–1	Ellyas Pical	TKO	14 (15)	28 Feb 1987	Gelora Bung Karno Main Stadium, Jakarta, Indonesia	Retained WBA super-flyweight title
30	Win	29–1	Israel Contreras	KO	5 (15)	1 Nov 1986	Ergilio Hato Stadium, Willemstad, Curaçao	Retained WBA super-flyweight title
29	Win	28–1	Edgar Monserrat	TKO	2 (15)	23 Dec 1985	Rajadamnern Stadium, Bangkok, Thailand	Retained WBA super-flyweight title
28	Win	27–1	Rafael Orono	TKO	5 (15)	21 Jul 1985	Rajadamnern Stadium, Bangkok, Thailand	Retained WBA super-flyweight title
27	Win	26–1	Dong Chun Lee	KO	7 (15)	6 Mar 1985	Rajadamnern Stadium, Bangkok, Thailand	Retained WBA super-flyweight title
26	Win	25–1	Eusebio Espinal	KO	6 (15)	21 Nov 1984	Rajadamnern Stadium, Bangkok, Thailand	Won vacant WBA super-flyweight title
25	Win	24–1	Young Ri Moon	KO	2 (10)	2 Sep 1984	Bangkok, Thailand	
24	Win	23–1	Val de Vera	TKO	7 (10)	11 Jul 1984	Bangkok, Thailand	
23	Win	22–1	Jae Sung Uhm	PTS	10	14 Mar 1984	Bangkok, Thailand	
22	Win	21–1	Joe Shiranui	TKO	4 (10)	14 Dec 1983	Bangkok, Thailand	
21	Win	20–1	Gil Ragas	TKO	7 (10)	12 Oct 1983	Rajadamnern Stadium, Bangkok, Thailand	
20	Win	19–1	Park Chan-yong	PTS	10	3 Aug 1983	Bangkok, Thailand	
19	Win	18–1	Luis Ibanez	KO	3 (10)	10 May 1983	Lumpinee Boxing Stadium, Bangkok, Thailand	
18	Win	17–1	Jose Luis Soto	KO	2 (10)	23 Feb 1983	Bangkok, Thailand	
17	Win	16–1	Marciano Sekiyama	KO	4 (10)	24 Dec 1982	Bangkok, Thailand	
16	Win	15–1	Mun Kyun Joo	KO	4 (10)	27 Nov 1982	Nakhon Ratchasima, Thailand	
15	Win	14–1	Willie Jensen	KO	2 (10)	13 Oct 1982	Bangkok, Thailand	
14	Win	13–1	Adan Uribe	KO	4 (10)	26 Aug 1982	Bangkok, Thailand	
13	Win	12–1	Agus Suyanto	KO	4 (10)	14 Jul 1982	Bangkok, Thailand	
12	Win	11–1	Ali Formentera	KO	5 (10)	24 May 1982	Rajadamnern Stadium, Bangkok, Thailand	
11	Win	10–1	Yu-Ok Joo	KO	4 (10)	14 Apr 1982	Bangkok, Thailand	
10	Win	9–1	Katsuyuki Ohashi	KO	3 (10)	10 Mar 1982	Bangkok, Thailand	
9	Win	8–1	Sakdisamai Chorsirirat	KO	7 (10)	25 Jan 1982	Bangkok, Thailand	Won vacant Thai bantamweight title
8	Win	7–1	Tsuguyuki Toma	KO	4 (10)	14 Oct 1981	Bangkok, Thailand	
7	Loss	6–1	Sak Galaxy	PTS	10	29 Jul 1981	Bangkok, Thailand	For vacant Thai bantamweight title
6	Win	6–0	Phichitsuk Korusayarm	PTS	6	24 Jun 1981	Bangkok, Thailand	
5	Win	5–0	Thanee Singchaowal	KO	1 (6)	10 Jun 1981	Bangkok, Thailand	
4	Win	4–0	Tordsakdi Pornthavee	KO	3 (6)	13 May 1981	Rajadamnern Stadium, Bangkok, Thailand	
3	Win	3–0	Prasong Sithkempetch	KO	1 (6)	26 Jan 1981	Bangkok, Thailand	
2	Win	2–0	Sentiang Sithkempetch	KO	2 (6)	31 Dec 1980	Bangkok, Thailand	
1	Win	1–0	Pook Sritam	KO	5 (6)	17 Dec 1980	Bangkok, Thailand	

== Muay Thai record ==
Muay Thai Record
Date	Result	Opponent	Event	Location	Method	Round	Time
1980-09-09	Loss	(Thailand) Kongsadan Sor.Prateep	Lumpinee Stadium	Bangkok, Thailand	Decision	5	3:00
1980-08-22	Win	(Thailand) Pairatnoi Chuwattana	Lumpinee Stadium	Bangkok, Thailand	Decision	5	3:00
1980-08-13	NC	(Thailand) Ek Sit Por Daeng	Rajadamnern Stadium	Bangkok, Thailand	Ek dismissed	3	
1980-07-09	Loss	(Thailand) Pairatnoi Chuwattana	Rajadamnern Stadium	Bangkok, Thailand	Decision	5	3:00
1980-06-19	Win	(Thailand) Phonpichit Sor.Sermphong		Thailand	KO	4	
1980-05-21	Win	(Thailand) Thongnoi Porntawee	Rajadamnern Stadium	Bangkok, Thailand	Decision	5	3:00
1980-04-12	Win	(Thailand) Sorram Sor.Kingstar		Lom Sak district, Thailand	Decision	5	3:00
1980-03-22	Win	(Thailand) Sakchan Pornthawee		Phetchabun province, Thailand	Decision	5	3:00
1980-01-26	Win	(Thailand) Banyat Sor.Sitthichai		Lom Sak district, Thailand	Decision	5	3:00
1979-07-15	Win	(Thailand) Yodpetch Porntawee	Rajadamnern Stadium	Bangkok, Thailand	Decision	5	3:00
1979-06-29	Win	(Thailand) Khwanjai Lukkhaoluk		Phichit province, Thailand	Decision	5	3:00
1979-06-01	Win	(Thailand) Fa-uthai Kiatchucherd		Lom Sak district, Thailand	Decision	5	3:00
1979-05-05	Win	(Thailand) Kingchai Sit Poonchai		Lom Sak district, Thailand	Decision	5	3:00
1979-04-07	Win	(Thailand) Fa-uthai Kiatchucherd		Lom Sak district, Thailand	Decision	5	3:00
1979-03-05	Loss	(Thailand) Hongfannoi Sit Taothong		Lom Sak district, Thailand	Decision	5	3:00
1979-02-14	Win	(Thailand) Phetsila Singmuangpak		Lom Sak district, Thailand	Decision	5	3:00
1979-01-03	Draw	(Thailand) Hongfannoi Sit Taothong		Phetchabun province, Thailand	Decision	5	3:00
Legend: Win Loss Draw/No contest Notes

Sporting positions
World boxing titles
Vacant Title last held by Jiro Watanabe	WBA super-flyweight champion 21 November 1984 – 22 December 1991; Retired	Vacant Title next held by Katsuya Onizuka
