= Gilberto Román =

Mexican boxer (1961–1990)

Personal information
- Nickname: El Chaparral
- Born: Gilberto Román Saldaña; November 29, 1961 Mexicali, Baja California, Mexico
- Died: June 27, 1990 (aged 28) Chilpancingo, Guerrero, Mexico
- Height: 5 ft 3 in (160 cm)
- Weight: Super flyweight

Boxing career
- Stance: Orthodox

Boxing record
- Total fights: 61
- Wins: 54
- Win by KO: 35
- Losses: 6
- Draws: 1

Gilberto Román (29 November 1961 – 27 June 1990) was a Mexican professional boxer and a member of the 1980 Mexican Olympic team. Román was a two-time WBC and Lineal Super Flyweight Champion and is considered by many fans to be one of the great champions in this division. Gilberto was trained by Boxing Hall of Famer Ignacio Beristáin.

== Amateur career ==
As an amateur boxer he won some Mexican National Championships and was a member of the 1980 Mexican Olympic team. He fought with Ezequiel Cano Molina, from Cd. Valles, S.L.P. in Naranjos, Veracruz, México, and with many other important amateur boxers.

== 1980 Olympic record ==
Below are the results of Gilberto Roman, a Mexican flyweight boxer who competed in the 1980 Moscow Olympics:

- Round of 32: bye
- Round of 16: defeated Alberto Mercado (Puerto Rico) referee stopped contest in first round
- Quarterfinal: lost to Petar Lesov (Bulgaria) by decision, 1-4

== Professional career ==
Román made his professional debut on August 29, 1981 with a knockout victory over Gilberto Morales. He was known as a knockout puncher in the earlier portion of his career, but after suffering two consecutive losses in 1985, he began refining his boxing technique. After accumulating a record of 40-3-0, including a rematch victory over former champion Antonio Avelar & prospect Freddie Santos, he received his first opportunity for a world title.

=== WBC Super Flyweight Championship ===
In 1986, Román dethroned long reigning WBC and Lineal Super Flyweight Champion Jiro Watanabe, ending the Japanese champion's streak of 12 consecutive title victories.

Román was a busy traveling champion. In his first title defense, he defeated Edgar Monserrat in France. He then traveled to Argentina where he defeated Ruben Osvaldo Condori and was held to a draw against Argentinian former WBA Flyweight Champion Santos Laciar on 30 August 1986. He then defeated Kongtoranee Payakaroon in Thailand and returned to France where he defeated Antoine Montero. In his first fight in Mexico since becoming champion, he decisioned former champion Frank Cedeno. Román met Laciar in a rematch on 16 May 1987 in France, with Laciar taking the title by technical knockout in a fight stopped on cuts in the eleventh-round despite Román leading on all three scorecards by one point.

=== Regaining title ===
Sugar Baby Rojas took the title from Laciar and Román earned another title shot against the new champion. On 8 April 1988, Román regained the title with a twelve-round decision.

He then traveled to Japan where he defeated Yoshiyuki Uchida and future champion Kiyoshi Hatanaka. Next he faced Rojas in a rematch and decisioned him once again. Roman began 1989 with a victory over Puerto Rican challenger Juan Carazo in a fight in which each boxer was dropped to the floor in the fourth round. In his next fight he avenged his loss to Laciar via unanimous decision. Following his victory over Laciar, Román lost the title to Ghana's Nana Konadu on 7 November 1989. Konadu lost the title to Sung-Kil Moon, whom Román challenged on 9 June 1990, losing by a TKO in the ninth round in what turned out to be his final fight.

Román had a record of 54 wins, 6 losses and 1 draw, with 35 wins by knockout. His total of 11 successful title defenses ranks second highest in the history of the super flyweight division.

== Professional boxing record ==
61 fights	54 wins	6 losses
By knockout	35	2
By decision	19	2
By disqualification	0	2
Draws	1	

No.	Result	Record	Opponent	Type	Round, time	Date	Location	Notes
61	Loss	54–6–1	Moon Sung-kil	RTD	8 (12)	1990-06-09	88 Gymnasium, Seoul, South Korea	For WBC super-flyweight title
60	Win	54–5–1	Mike Phelps	TD	9 (10)	1990-04-23	Great Western Forum, Inglewood, California, U.S.	
59	Loss	53–5–1	Nana Konadu	UD	12 (12)	1989-11-07	Arena México, Mexico City, Mexico	Lost WBC super-flyweight title
58	Win	53–4–1	Santos Laciar	UD	12 (12)	1989-09-12	Great Western Forum, Inglewood, California, U.S.	Retained WBC super-flyweight title
57	Win	52–4–1	Juan Carazo	UD	12 (12)	1989-06-05	Great Western Forum, Inglewood, California, U.S.	Retained WBC super-flyweight title
56	Win	51–4–1	Sugar Baby Rojas	UD	12 (12)	1988-11-07	Caesars Palace, Paradise, Nevada, U.S.	Retained WBC super-flyweight title
55	Win	50–4–1	Kiyoshi Hatanaka	UD	12 (12)	1988-09-04	Rainbow Hall, Nagoya, Japan	Retained WBC super-flyweight title
54	Win	49–4–1	Yoshiyuki Uchida	TKO	5 (12)	1988-07-09	City Gymnasium, Kawagoe, Japan	Retained WBC super-flyweight title
53	Win	48–4–1	Sugar Baby Rojas	UD	12 (12)	1988-04-08	Convention Center, Miami Beach, Florida, U.S.	Won WBC super-flyweight title
52	Win	47–4–1	Jorge Ramirez	TKO	6 (10)	1987-10-30	Plaza de Toros Calafia, Mexicali, Mexico	
51	Loss	46–4–1	Santos Laciar	TKO	11 (12)	1987-05-16	Complexe Sportif René Tys, Reims, France	Lost WBC super-flyweight title
50	Win	46–3–1	Frank Cedeno	UD	12 (12)	1987-03-20	Plaza de Toros Calafia, Mexicali, Mexico	Retained WBC super-flyweight title
49	Win	45–3–1	Antoine Montero	TKO	9 (12)	1987-01-31	Le Zénith Sud, Montpellier, France	Retained WBC super-flyweight title
48	Win	44–3–1	Kongtoranee Payakaroon	UD	12 (12)	1986-12-19	Indoor Stadium Huamark, Bangkok, Thailand	Retained WBC super-flyweight title
47	Draw	43–3–1	Santos Laciar	SD	12 (12)	1986-08-30	Pabellon Verde, Córdoba, Argentina	Retained WBC super-flyweight title
46	Win	43–3	Ruben Osvaldo Condori	UD	12 (12)	1986-07-18	Polideportivo Delmi, Salta, Argentina	Retained WBC super-flyweight title
45	Win	42–3	Edgar Monserrat	SD	12 (12)	1986-05-15	Stade Pierre de Coubertin, Paris, France	Retained WBC super-flyweight title
44	Win	41–3	Jiro Watanabe	UD	12 (12)	1986-03-30	Sports Centre, Itami, Japan	Won WBC super-flyweight title
43	Win	40–3	Arturo Castillo	PTS	10 (10)	1985-11-29	Aguascalientes, Mexico	
42	Win	39–3	Fidel Martinez	TKO	2 (?)	1985-11-20	Acapulco, Mexico	
41	Win	38–3	Arnulfo Luna	KO	4 (?)	1985-09-27	Campeche, Mexico	
40	Win	37–3	Armando Morales Terron	TKO	5 (?)	1985-08-23	Ciudad Del Carmen, Mexico	
39	Win	36–3	Freddie Santos	TKO	5 (10)	1985-07-06	Plaza de Toros Calafia, Mexicali, Mexico	
38	Win	35–3	Mario Gomez	UD	10 (10)	1985-06-07	Nuevo Laredo, Mexico	
37	Win	34–3	Oscar Bolivar	TKO	6 (10)	1985-05-04	Concorde Boxing Arena, Oranjestad, Aruba	
36	Win	33–3	Antonio Avelar	TKO	7 (10)	1985-03-30	Auditorio del Estado, Mexicali, Mexico	
35	Loss	32–3	Jorge Ramirez	UD	10 (10)	1985-01-28	Tijuana, Mexico	
34	Loss	32–2	Antonio Avelar	DQ	5 (10)	1985-01-01	Auditorio del Estado, Mexicali, Mexico	
33	Win	32–1	Diego Avila	TKO	8 (?)	1984-12-02	Mexicali, Mexico	
32	Win	31–1	Wayne Lynumn	TKO	2 (10)	1984-10-30	Veterans Memorial Building, Culver City, California, U.S.	
31	Win	30–1	Bernardo Ibarra	PTS	10 (10)	1984-10-01	Tijuana, Mexico	
30	Win	29–1	Berlin Olivetti	TKO	2 (10)	1984-06-17	J.J. Crosetti Hall, Watsonville, California, U.S.	
29	Win	28–1	Manuel Aguilar	KO	6 (?)	1984-03-31	Auditorio del Estado, Mexicali, Mexico	
28	Win	27–1	Paul Ferreri	UD	10 (10)	1984-03-15	Olympic Auditorium, Los Angeles, California, U.S.	
27	Win	26–1	Rodolfo Martinez	TKO	9 (?)	1984-01-13	Mexicali, Mexico	
26	Win	25–1	Freddie Santos	KO	4 (10)	1983-12-01	Olympic Auditorium, Los Angeles, California, U.S.	
25	Win	24–1	George Garcia	TKO	9 (10)	1983-11-03	Olympic Auditorium, Los Angeles, California, U.S.	
24	Win	23–1	Ron Cisneros	TKO	7 (10)	1983-09-15	Olympic Auditorium, Los Angeles, California, U.S.	
23	Win	22–1	Pedro Rojas	KO	2 (?)	1983-07-08	Poza Rica, Mexico	
22	Win	21–1	Armando Loredo	UD	10 (10)	1983-06-20	Astro Arena, Houston, Texas, U.S.	
21	Win	20–1	Jose Torres	PTS	10 (10)	1983-05-19	Sports Arena, Los Angeles, California, U.S.	
20	Win	19–1	Jose Sosa	TKO	3 (?)	1983-04-15	Mexicali, Mexico	
19	Win	18–1	Elid Fernandez	TKO	7 (?)	1983-03-06	Mexicali, Mexico	
18	Win	17–1	Ubaldo Gonzalez	TKO	2 (?)	1983-02-14	Tijuana, Mexico	
17	Win	16–1	Antonio Escobar	TKO	10 (10)	1983-01-31	Tijuana, Mexico	
16	Win	15–1	Lupe Acosta	KO	6 (?)	1982-12-15	Tijuana, Mexico	
15	Win	14–1	Ramon Noguera	KO	4 (?)	1982-11-29	Tijuana, Mexico	
14	Win	13–1	Carlos De La Paz	TKO	5 (?)	1982-10-16	Mexico City, Mexico	
13	Win	12–1	Fidel Martinez	KO	4 (?)	1982-09-21	Mexico City, Mexico	
12	Win	11–1	Bobby Ruiz	TKO	6 (?)	1982-08-21	Mexico City, Mexico	
11	Loss	10–1	Diego Avila	DQ	7 (?)	1982-07-03	Mexico City, Mexico	
10	Win	10–0	Heriberto Saavedra	PTS	10 (10)	1982-06-12	Mexico City, Mexico	
9	Win	9–0	Ciro Cayetano	KO	8 (?)	1982-05-28	Acapulco, Mexico	
8	Win	8–0	Alejo Garcia	PTS	10 (10)	1982-04-02	Ciudad Valles, Mexico	
7	Win	7–0	Miguel Angel Juarez	KO	7 (?)	1982-03-19	Acapulco, Mexico	
6	Win	6–0	Gilberto Villacana	TKO	7 (?)	1982-02-19	Mexicali, Mexico	
5	Win	5–0	Juan Zarate	KO	3 (?)	1982-01-16	Mexico City, Mexico	
4	Win	4–0	Juan Carlos Montalvo	KO	1 (?)	1981-12-19	Mexico City, Mexico	
3	Win	3–0	Leo Castellanos	KO	1 (?)	1981-10-30	Acapulco, Mexico	
2	Win	2–0	Leonardo Valdez	TKO	8 (10)	1981-09-13	Mexicali, Mexico	
1	Win	1–0	Gilberto Morales	KO	7 (?)	1981-08-29	Villahermosa, Mexico	

== Death ==
Roman died in a car accident on 27 June 1990; he was riding in a car that was hit by a truck on a highway near Chilpancingo.

== See also ==
- Lineal championship
- List of Mexican boxing world champions
- List of world super-flyweight boxing champions

Sporting positions
World boxing titles
Preceded by Jiro Watanabe	WBC super-flyweight champion March 30, 1986 – May 16, 1987	Succeeded by Santos Laciar
Preceded by Sugar Baby Rojas	WBC super-flyweight champion April 8, 1988 – November 7, 1989	Succeeded by Nana Konadu
Status
Preceded by Davey Moore	Latest born world champion to die June 27, 1990 – July 16, 1995	Succeeded by Elvis Álvarez
