= Israel Contreras =

Venezuelan boxer

Personal information
- Nationality: Venezuela
- Born: Israel Contreras; December 27, 1960 (age 65) La Guaira, Venezuela
- Weight: Super flyweight; Bantamweight

Boxing career
- Stance: Orthodox

Boxing record
- Total fights: 42
- Wins: 38
- Win by KO: 27
- Losses: 3
- Draws: 1
- No contests: 0

Israel Contreras (born December 27, 1960) is a Venezuelan former professional boxer who won the World Boxing Organization and World Boxing Association world bantamweight titles.

== Boxing career ==
Contreras turned professional in 1981 and lost his first title fight to WBA super flyweight title holder Khaosai Galaxy by KO in 1986. He later moved up in weight and in 1990 captured the WBO bantamweight title with a TKO over Ray Minus. Contreras vacated the title to fight Luisito Espinosa for WBA belt in 1991 and won by KO in the 5th. He lost the belt in his first defense to Eddie Cook. He retired in 1995 after a TKO loss to Johnny Vasquez. Contreras collapsed in the hospital after the bout, but recovered.

Achievements
New championship	WBO bantamweight champion February 3, 1989 – February 20, 1991; Vacated	Vacant Title next held by Gaby Canizales
Preceded by Luisito Espinosa	WBA bantamweight champion October 19, 1991 – March 15, 1992	Succeeded by Eddie Cook
