= Ellyas Pical =

Indonesian boxer (born 1960)

Elly Pical

Personal information
- Nickname: The Exocet
- Born: Ellyas Pical; 24 March 1960 (age 66) Saparua, Maluku, Indonesia
- Height: 5 ft 5 in (165 cm)
- Weight: Super flyweight

Boxing career
- Stance: Southpaw

Boxing record
- Total fights: 26
- Wins: 20
- Win by KO: 11
- Losses: 5
- Draws: 1
- No contests: 0

Ellyas Pical (born 24 March 1960) is an Indonesian former professional boxer who competed from 1989 to 2000. He is the first Indonesian to hold a world boxing title, having held the International Boxing Federation (IBF) super flyweight title three-times between 1985 to 1989.

== Life and career ==
In his childhood, Pical was a pearl diver, diving without equipment. Pical is of Ambonese/Moluccan heritage. Pical's nickname "The Exocet" was given by the press referring to his left-hand punch. The name comes from the French-made missiles used to against the Royal Navy by the Argentine Air Force during the Falklands War, which happened in 1982 during Pical's era. He was inspired to become a boxer by watching boxing matches on television. He got his title with this left-hand punch, knocking out defending champion Ju-Do Chun. At that time, Pical was only the second man from Indonesia to fight for a world title, following Thomas Americo (defeated by Saoul Mamby for the WBC Super lightweight title in Jakarta in 1981).

In 1987, after issues with his managers Simson Tambunan and Anton Sihotang, as well as short-term managers Dali Sofari dan Khairus Sahel He eventually took singer Melky Goeslaw as his manager and Enteng Tanamal as assistant manager.

On February 28, 1987, he challenged for the WBA title against the Thai titleholder and future International Boxing Hall of Fame inductee, Khaosai Galaxy, at Senayan Stadium in Jakarta. He was defeated by TKO (referee stoppage) in the 14th round.

Initially, the bout was scheduled as a unification match for the WBA and IBF 115 lb titles, since Pical was the reigning IBF champion for the second time and had made one successful defense. However, the IBF did not sanction the fight and later stripped him of the title.

Pical lives with his wife Rina Siahaya Pical, a dentist, and his sons Lorinly and Matthew. Pical currently works on the staff of KONI - Indonesian Olympic Committee.

== Biographical film ==
His biography has created a film released in Ellyas Pical on March 21, 2024 on Prime Video.

== Professional boxing record ==
26 fights	20 wins	5 losses
By knockout	11	1
By decision	9	4
Draws	1	

No.	Result	Record	Opponent	Type	Round	Date	Location	Notes
26	Win	20–5–1	Juwono	PTS	10	May 28, 2000	Bung Karno Stadium, Jakarta, Indonesia	
25	Draw	19–5–1	Charles Hery	PTS	8	Nov 10, 1990	Bung Karno Stadium, Jakarta, Indonesia	
24	Loss	19–5	Greg Richardson	MD	10	Mar 12, 1990	Bung Karno Stadium, Jakarta, Indonesia	
23	Loss	19–4	Juan Polo Perez	UD	12	Oct 14, 1989	Valley Sports Arena, Roanoke, Virginia, U.S.	Lost IBF super flyweight title
22	Win	19–3	Mike Phelps	SD	12	Feb 25, 1989	National Stadium, Singapore	Retained IBF super flyweight title
21	Win	18–3	Ki Chang Kim	UD	12	Sep 4, 1988	Gelora 10 November Stadium, Surabaya, Indonesia	Retained IBF super flyweight title
20	Win	17–3	Raul Ernesto Diaz	UD	15	Feb 20, 1988	GOR Pangsuma, Pontianak, Indonesia	Retained IBF super flyweight title
19	Win	16–3	Chang Tae-il	SD	15	Oct 7, 1987	Bung Karno Stadium, Jakarta, Indonesia	Won IBF super flyweight title
18	Win	15–3	Sukardi	KO	4 (?)	Sep 6, 1987	Surabaya, Indonesia	
17	Loss	14–3	Khaosai Galaxy	TKO	14 (15)	Feb 28, 1987	Bung Karno Stadium, Jakarta, Indonesia	For WBA super flyweight title
16	Win	14–2	Dong Chun Lee	KO	10 (15)	Dec 3, 1986	Bung Karno Stadium, Jakarta, Indonesia	Retained IBF super flyweight title
15	Win	13–2	Cesar Polanco	KO	3 (15)	Jul 5, 1986	Bung Karno Stadium, Jakarta, Indonesia	Won IBF super flyweight title
14	Loss	12–2	Cesar Polanco	SD	15	Feb 15, 1986	P.I. Arena-Coliseum, Jakarta, Indonesia	Lost IBF super flyweight title
13	Win	12–1	Wayne Mulholland	TKO	3 (15)	Aug 25, 1985	Bung Karno Stadium, Jakarta, Indonesia	Retained IBF super flyweight title
12	Win	11–1	Chun Ju-do	TKO	8 (15)	May 3, 1985	Bung Karno Stadium, Jakarta, Indonesia	Won IBF super flyweight title
11	Win	10–1	Mutsuo Watanabe	TKO	6 (12)	Oct 7, 1984	Senayan, Indonesia	Retained OPBF super flyweight
10	Win	9–1	Hee Yun Jung	PTS	12	May 19, 1984	Seoul, South Korea	Won vacant OPBF super flyweight
9	Win	8–1	Prayurasak Muangsurin	KO	1 (?)	Mar 30, 1984	Samrong, Thailand	
8	Win	7–1	Wongso Indrajit	PTS	10	Nov 1, 1983	Surabaya, Malang	
7	Win	6–1	Viboon Muangsurin	PTS	10	Sep 11, 1983	Jakarta, Malang	
6	Win	5–1	Munadi	KO	2 (?)	Aug 18, 1983	Jakarta, Malang	
5	Loss	4–1	Edward Apay	PTS	10	Jul 24, 1983	GOR Pulosari, Malang, Indonesia	
4	Win	4–0	Moningko Palungan	KO	2 (?)	May 15, 1983	Malang, Indonesia	
3	Win	3–0	Juwarno	KO	1 (?)	Feb 6, 1983	Malang, Indonesia	
2	Win	2–0	Benny Nuriante	PTS	6	Dec 19, 1982	GOR Pulosari, Malang, Indonesia	
1	Win	1–0	Eddy Rafael	KO	4 (?)	Dec 10, 1982	Jakarta, Indonesia	

== See also ==
- List of super-flyweight boxing champions

Sporting positions
World boxing titles
Preceded by Chun Ju-do	IBF super flyweight champion May 3, 1985 - February 15, 1986	Succeeded by Cesar Polanco
Preceded by Cesar Polanco	IBF super flyweight champion July 5, 1986 - March 18, 1987; Stripped	Vacant Title next held by Chang Tae-il
Preceded by Chang Tae-il	IBF super flyweight champion October 17, 1987 - October 14, 1989	Succeeded by Juan Polo Perez
