= Super flyweight =

Weight class in professional boxing (51–52 kg)

Super flyweight, also referred to as junior bantamweight, is a weight class in professional boxing, contested from 112 pounds (51 kg) and up to 115 pounds (52 kg).

== History ==
The first title match in this division was in 1980, when the World Boxing Council responded to pressure from Asian and Latin American members who felt the difference between the flyweight limit and the bantamweight limit was too significant. Rafael Orono won the inaugural title in February of that year by defeating Seung-Hoon Lee. The World Boxing Association followed suit in 1981 when Gustavo Ballas won the vacant title by knocking out Sok-Chul Baek. The first International Boxing Federation champion was Ju-Do Chun, who won the belt in 1983 with a knockout of Ken Kasugai.

Notable champions in this division have been Ellyas Pical, Gilberto Román, Jiro Watanabe, Moon Sung-kil, Nana Konadu, Mark Johnson, Johnny Tapia, Robert Quiroga, Danny Romero, Vic Darchinyan, Khaosai Galaxy, Samson Dutch Boy Gym, Román González, Carlos Cuadras, Tepparith Singwancha, Naoya Inoue, Omar Andrés Narváez, McJoe Arroyo, Juan Francisco Estrada and Srisaket Sor Rungvisai.

Khaosai Galaxy holds the record for most consecutive title defenses at this division, with 19 defenses of the WBA title.

== Current world champions ==
Sanctioning body	Reign began	Champion	Record	Defenses
WBA	Jun 13, 2026	David Jiménez	18–1 (12 KO)	0
WBC		vacant		
IBF	Jun 6, 2026	Andrew Moloney	29–4–0–1 (18 KO)	0
WBO	July 20, 2026	Kenshiro Teraji	26–2 (16 KO)	0

== Current The Ring world rankings ==
As of June 18, 2026.

Keys:

C Current The Ring world champion

Rank	Name	Record	Title(s)
C	vacant		
1	Fernando Martínez	18–1 (9 KO)	
2	David Jiménez	18–1 (12 KO)	WBA
3	Phumelele Cafu	11–1–3 (8 KO)	
4	Andrew Moloney	29–4–0 (1) (17 KO)	IBF
5	Tomoya Tsuboi	3–0 (2 KO)	
6	Ricardo Malajika	17–2 (12 KO)	
7	Israel González	31–5–2 (12 KO)	
8	Willibaldo García	23–7–2 (1) (13 KO)	
9	Theophilous Kpakpo Allotey	13–0 (10 KO)	
10	Sikho Nqothole	22–3 (13 KO)	
