= Martín Castillo (boxer) =

Mexican boxer (born 1977)

Personal information
- Nickname: El Gallo
- Born: José Martín Castillo Garcia; January 13, 1977 (age 49) Mexico City, Mexico
- Height: 5 ft 6 in (168 cm)
- Weight: Super flyweight

Boxing career
- Reach: 67 in (170 cm)
- Stance: Orthodox

Boxing record
- Total fights: 39
- Wins: 35
- Win by KO: 18
- Losses: 4

José "El Gallito" Martín Castillo (born 13 January 1977) is a Mexican boxer. He represented his native country of Mexico at the 1996 Summer Olympics, and is a former World Boxing Association Super Flyweight champion.

== Professional boxing record ==
39 fights	35 wins	4 losses
By knockout	18	3
By decision	16	1
By disqualification	1	0

No.	Result	Record	Opponent	Type	Round, time	Date	Location	Notes
39	Loss	35–4	Jorge Arce	KO	1 (10)	2010-07-31	Palenque de la Feria, Tepic, Mexico	
38	Win	35–3	Germán Meraz	DQ	6 (8)	2009-09-25	El Nido Sports Center, Mexicali, Mexico	
37	Win	34–3	Alfredo Montano	KO	1 (8)	2009-07-18	El Nido Sports Center, Mexicali, Mexico	
36	Loss	33–3	Fernando Montiel	KO	4 (12)	2008-02-16	MGM Grand Garden Arena, Paradise, Nevada, U.S.	For WBO super-flyweight title
35	Win	33–2	Jonathan Pérez	UD	10 (10)	2007-10-26	Cicero Stadium, Cicero, Illinois, U.S.	
34	Win	32–2	Oscar Andrade	UD	10 (10)	2007-07-27	Isleta Casino & Resort, Albuquerque, New Mexico, U.S.	
33	Win	31–2	Jorge Romero	KO	5 (10)	2007-05-12	Caliente Hipódromo, Tijuana, Mexico	
32	Loss	30–2	Nobuo Nashiro	TKO	10 (12)	2006-07-22	Arena, Higashiōsaka, Japan	Lost WBA super-flyweight title
31	Win	30–1	Alexander Muñoz	SD	12 (12)	2006-01-21	Thomas & Mack Center, Paradise, Nevada, U.S.	Retained WBA super-flyweight title
30	Win	29–1	Hideyasu Ishihara	UD	12 (12)	2005-06-26	Prefectural Gymnasium, Nagoya, Japan	Retained WBA super-flyweight title
29	Win	28–1	Eric Morel	UD	12 (12)	2005-03-19	MGM Grand Garden Arena, Paradise, Nevada, U.S.	Retained WBA super-flyweight title
28	Win	27–1	Alexander Muñoz	UD	12 (12)	2004-12-03	Entertainment Center, Laredo, Texas, U.S.	Won WBA super-flyweight title
27	Win	26–1	Hideyasu Ishihara	TKO	11 (12)	2004-05-16	Memorial Center, Gifu, Japan	Won interim WBA super-flyweight title
26	Win	25–1	Roger Galicia	UD	12 (12)	2004-01-23	Expo Center, Kansas City, Missouri, U.S.	
25	Win	24–1	Alberto Ontiveros	TKO	4 (10)	2003-08-22	Ector County Coliseum, Odessa, Texas, U.S.	
24	Win	23–1	Valerio Sánchez	UD	8 (8)	2003-02-22	Arrowhead Pond, Anaheim, California, U.S.	
23	Win	22–1	Keyri Wong	TKO	8 (10)	2002-11-23	Arrowhead Pond, Anaheim, California, U.S.	
22	Loss	21–1	Félix Machado	TD	6 (12)	2002-03-30	Sovereign Center, Reading, Pennsylvania, U.S.	For IBF super-flyweight title
21	Win	21–0	Pedro Morquecho	KO	3 (10)	2001-11-18	Soboba Casino, San Jacinto, California, U.S.	
20	Win	20–0	Ricardo Vargas	TD	6 (12)	2001-07-15	Soboba Casino, San Jacinto, California, U.S.	Won NABO & vacant USBA super-flyweight titles
19	Win	19–0	Evangelio Perez	TKO	3 (10)	2001-05-27	Celebrity Theatre, Phoenix, Arizona, U.S.	
18	Win	18–0	Francisco Tejedor	KO	1 (10)	2001-03-25	Greyhound Park, Phoenix, Arizona, U.S.	
17	Win	17–0	Omar Adorno	RTD	7 (10)	2001-01-28	Greyhound Park, Phoenix, Arizona, U.S.	
16	Win	16–0	Gabriel Munoz	UD	10 (10)	2000-10-29	El Gran Mercado, Phoenix, Arizona, U.S.	
15	Win	15–0	Oscar Andrade	UD	10 (10)	2000-09-03	Casino West, Yerington, Nevada, U.S.	
14	Win	14–0	Jose Francisco Sarabia	TKO	1 (6)	2000-06-16	Fantasy Springs Resort Casino, Indio, California, U.S.	
13	Win	13–0	Miguel Angel Granados	KO	8 (8)	2000-03-25	Huntington Park Casino, Huntington Park, California, U.S.	
12	Win	12–0	Porfirio Torres	TKO	2 (6)	2000-02-05	Steven's Steakhouse, Commerce, California, U.S.	
11	Win	11–0	Esteban Ayala	KO	2 (?)	1999-09-25	Pechanga Resort & Casino, Temecula, California, U.S.	
10	Win	10–0	Dario Lopez	KO	2 (4)	1999-08-09	Arrowhead Pond, Anaheim, California, U.S.	
9	Win	9–0	Danny Alberto Rizo	RTD	3 (4)	1999-07-24	Tropicana, Paradise, Nevada, U.S.	
8	Win	8–0	Salvador Casillas	UD	6 (6)	1999-06-07	Arrowhead Pond, Anaheim, California, U.S.	
7	Win	7–0	Alejandro Moreno	SD	4 (4)	1999-05-15	Equestrian Center, El Paso, Texas, U.S.	
6	Win	6–0	Esau Dieguez	RTD	3 (4)	1999-04-26	Arrowhead Pond, Anaheim, California, U.S.	
5	Win	5–0	Ivan Pena	KO	3 (?)	1998-11-19	Country Club, Reseda, California, U.S.	
4	Win	4–0	Antonio Perez	KO	2 (?)	1998-11-07	Country Club, Reseda, California, U.S.	
3	Win	3–0	Danny Alberto Rizo	UD	4 (4)	1998-10-22	Scottish Rite Center, San Diego, California, U.S.	
2	Win	2–0	Ruben Lopez	UD	4 (4)	1998-09-28	Great Western Forum, Inglewood, California, U.S.	
1	Win	1–0	Ricardo Contreras	UD	4 (4)	1998-07-27	Great Western Forum, Inglewood, California, U.S.	

== See also ==
- List of Mexican boxing world champions
- List of world super-flyweight boxing champions

Sporting positions
Regional boxing titles
Preceded by Ricardo Vargas	NABO super-flyweight champion July 15, 2001 – 2002; Vacated	Vacant Title next held by José Navarro
Vacant Title last held by Francisco Espitia	USBA super-flyweight champion July 15, 2001 – 2002; Vacated	Vacant Title next held by Vernie Torres
World boxing titles
Vacant Title last held by Leo Gámez	WBA super-flyweight champion Interim title May 16, 2004 – December 3, 2004; Won full title	Vacant Title next held by Rafael Concepción
Preceded by Alexander Muñoz	WBA super-flyweight champion December 3, 2004 – July 22, 2006	Succeeded by Nobuo Nashiro
