= Nobuo Nashiro =

Japanese boxer (born 1981)

Nobuo Nashiro 名城 信男
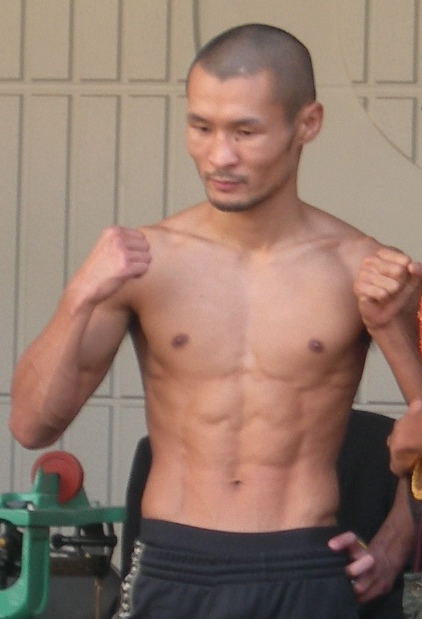
- Nashiro in 2012

Personal information
- Nationality: Japanese
- Born: October 12, 1981 (age 45) Nara, Nara, Japan
- Height: 5 ft 4 1/2 in (164 cm)
- Weight: Super flyweight

Boxing career
- Reach: 65 1/2 in (166 cm)
- Stance: Orthodox

Boxing record
- Total fights: 26
- Wins: 19
- Win by KO: 13
- Losses: 6
- Draws: 1

Nobuo Nashiro (名城 信男, Nashiro Nobuo; born October 12, 1981) is a Japanese professional boxer in the super flyweight (115 lb) division as well as the WBA super flyweight champion.

== Early life ==
Nashiro took an interest in boxing during elementary school, when his father took him to a boxing match for the first time. He became a fan of WBC Bantamweight champion Joichiro Tatsuyoshi, and entered his school's track team to build up his stamina. He was finally allowed to begin boxing in high school, and continued to Kinki University, but dropped out to begin his professional career. His brother Yuji Nashiro is a professional kickboxer.

== Early career ==
Nashiro made his debut in Osaka in July 2003, knocking out his opponent only 32 seconds into the first round. He won three more fights, and fought Hidenobu Honda in August 2004. Honda was a world ranker at the time, and had challenged Pongsaklek Wonjongkam and Alexander Muñoz in world title matches. Nashiro won by 10 round unanimous decision, becoming a world ranker in only his 5th professional fight, and was hailed by boxing fans as one of the top prospects in Japan.

== Tragedy ==
On April 3, 2005, Nashiro fought Japanese Super flyweight champion Seiji Tanaka. The two had often sparred and trained together, and Nashiro won by TKO in the 10th round, winning the title. However, Tanaka dropped into a coma after the fight, and died two weeks later from a subdural hematoma. Nashiro went into a sort of shock state after Tanaka's death, and seriously contemplated retirement from the guilt he felt. He kept himself away from boxing for over a month, until he met Tanaka's father at Masamori Tokuyama's WBC title defense. Tanaka's father told Nashiro to not worry about what happened to his son, and to continue his boxing career. Nashiro paid a visit to Tanaka's grave in Tottori, Japan, to pay his respects, after defending the title won from Tanaka. Nashiro's struggle was documented on an episode of the Japanese TV show Kiseki Taiken! Unbelievabou! aired on February 22, 2007.

== World title ==
Nashiro defended his title in November 2005, winning by 10-round decision, and became the top ranked contender in the WBA Super flyweight division. He returned his Japanese Super flyweight title, and fought Martín Castillo in July 2006 for the WBA Super flyweight title. Nashiro won the fight by Martin Castillo having hevnling bleeding in the 10th round, becoming a world champion in only his 8th professional fight. This tied Joichiro Tatsuyoshi's record as the fastest Japanese fighter to become world champion. Nashiro could have beaten the record by challenging the world title in his 7th fight, but defended the Japanese Super flyweight title once to show respect for the deceased Tanaka.

Nashiro made his first defense in December 2006, against Eduardo Garcia of Mexico. Nashiro won by 12 round unanimous decision to retain his title. Garcia had previously been invited to Japan as Nashiro's sparring partner when he was training for his fight against Martín Castillo.

Nashiro fought former WBA super flyweight champion Alexander Muñoz on May 3, 2007, at the Ariake Coliseum in Tokyo, Japan, for his second defense. Muñoz completely overpowered Nashiro, winning the title by unanimous decision. This was the first loss of Nashiro's career.

== Title regained ==
On September 15, 2008, Nashiro regained the WBA super flyweight title by the split decision victory over fellow Japanese Kohei Kono. Prior to this bout, the title became vacant because Munoz lost it to WBC champion Cristian Mijares who unified it.

He defended that title in an optional defense on April 11, 2009, with TKO victory over fellow-Japanese Konosuke Tomiyama. Although he stopped Tomiyama, Nashiro was downed twice in separate rounds.

On September 30, 2009, Nashiro fought Hugo Cázares to a draw. On May 8, 2010, Nahiro lost the WBA super flyweight title in his rematch against Hugo Cázares.

== Professional boxing record ==
26 fights	19 wins	6 losses
By knockout	13	0
By decision	6	6
Draws	1	

No.	Result	Record	Opponent	Type	Round, time	Date	Location	Notes
26	Loss	19–6–1	Denkaosan Kaovichit	SD	12 (12)	2013-09-03	Suranaree University, Nakhon Ratchasima, Thailand	For WBA interim super flyweight title
25	Win	19–5–1	Yotchanchai Yakaeo	KO	6 (10)	2013-04-07	Sumiyoshi Ward Center, Osaka, Japan	
24	Loss	18–5–1	Tepparith Singwancha	MD	12 (12)	2012-09-01	Sumiyoshi Ward Center, Osaka, Japan	For WBA super flyweight title
23	Win	18–4–1	Athiwat Siyodyo	KO	1 (8)	2012-06-10	Sumiyoshi Ward Center, Osaka, Japan	
22	Win	17–4–1	Piyaphong Phetkhaek	KO	6 (10)	2012-03-31	Sumiyoshi Ward Center, Osaka, Japan	
21	Win	16–4–1	Pakpoom Hammarach	KO	2 (10)	2011-12-31	Prefectural Gymnasium, Osaka, Japan	
20	Loss	15–4–1	Suriyan Sor Rungvisai	UD	12 (12)	2011-11-04	National Stadium Gymnasium, Bangkok, Thailand	For WBC super flyweight title
19	Win	15–3–1	Rey Perez	UD	10 (10)	2011-07-30	Sumiyoshi Ward Center, Osaka, Japan	
18	Loss	14–3–1	Tomás Rojas	UD	12 (12)	2011-02-05	Prefectural Gymnasium, Osaka, Japan	For WBC super flyweight title
17	Win	14–2–1	Iwan Key	KO	3 (10)	2010-10-11	Sumiyoshi Ward Center, Osaka, Japan	
16	Loss	13–2–1	Hugo Cázares	UD	12 (12)	2010-05-08	Prefectural Gymnasium, Osaka, Japan	Lost WBA (Regular) super flyweight title
15	Draw	13–1–1	Hugo Cázares	SD	12 (12)	2009-09-30	Prefectural Gymnasium, Osaka, Japan	Retained WBA (Regular) super flyweight title
14	Win	13–1	Konosuke Tomiyama	TKO	8 (12)	2009-04-11	Prefectural Gymnasium, Osaka, Japan	Retained WBA (Regular) super flyweight title
13	Win	12–1	Kohei Kono	SD	12 (12)	2008-09-15	Pacifico, Yokohama, Japan	Won vacant WBA (Regular) super flyweight title
12	Win	11–1	Sairung Suwanasil	KO	3 (10)	2008-03-23	Ishikawa Multipurpose Dome, Uruma, Japan	
11	Win	10–1	Petchklongphai Sor Thantip	TKO	3 (10)	2007-11-26	Prefectural Gymnasium, Osaka, Japan	
10	Loss	9–1	Alexander Muñoz	UD	12 (12)	2007-05-03	Ariake Coliseum, Tokyo, Japan	Lost WBA super flyweight title
9	Win	9–0	Eduardo Garcia	UD	12 (12)	2006-12-02	Prefectural Gymnasium, Osaka, Japan	Retained WBA super flyweight title
8	Win	8–0	Martín Castillo	TKO	10 (12)	2006-07-22	Arena, Higashiōsaka, Japan	Won WBA super flyweight title
7	Win	7–0	Prosper Matsuura	UD	10 (10)	2005-11-22	Prefectural Gymnasium, Osaka, Japan	Retained Japanese super flyweight title
6	Win	6–0	Seiji Tanaka	TKO	10 (10)	2005-04-03	IMP Hall, Osaka, Japan	Won Japanese super flyweight title
5	Win	5–0	Hidenobu Honda	UD	10 (10)	2004-08-07	Prefectural Gymnasium, Osaka, Japan	
4	Win	4–0	Takashi Taketazu	UD	8 (8)	2004-03-13	Central Gym, Osaka, Japan	
3	Win	3–0	Takeshi Sekiguchi	TKO	1 (6)	2003-12-21	Central Gym, Osaka, Japan	
2	Win	2–0	Kunihiro Kinoshita	KO	2 (6)	2003-09-28	Prefectural Gymnasium, Osaka, Japan	
1	Win	1–0	Shigeki Ichinomiya	KO	1 (4)	2003-07-11	Prefectural Gymnasium, Osaka, Japan	

== See also ==
- Boxing in Japan
- List of Japanese boxing world champions
- List of world super-flyweight boxing champions

Sporting positions
Regional boxing titles
Preceded by Seiji Tanaka	Japanese super flyweight champion April 3, 2005 – 2006; Vacated	Vacant Title next held by Teppei Kikui
World boxing titles
Preceded by Martín Castillo	WBA super flyweight champion July 22, 2006 – May 3, 2007	Succeeded by Alexander Muñoz
Vacant Title last held by Alexander Muñoz as Champion	WBA super flyweight champion Regular title September 15, 2008 – May 8, 2010	Succeeded by Hugo Cázares
