= Celes Kobayashi =

Japanese boxer (born 1973)

Celes Kobayashi セレス小林
Personal information
- Nationality: Japanese
- Born: Shoji Kobayashi; February 27, 1973 (age 53) Iwai, Ibaraki, Japan
- Height: 5 ft 6 1/2 in (169 cm)
- Weight: Super flyweight

Boxing career
- Stance: Southpaw

Boxing record
- Total fights: 32
- Wins: 24
- Win by KO: 14
- Losses: 5
- Draws: 3

Celes Kobayashi (セレス小林, born Shoji Kobayashi, February 27, 1973) is a former professional boxer from Ibaraki, Japan. He is a former WBA Super flyweight champion. He got his ring name, "Celes", from a company he used to work for. He lives in Chiba, Japan, with his wife and daughter.

== Biography ==
Kobayashi made his debut in April 1992 in the bantamweight division, losing by 4th-round decision. He dropped down two weight classes to challenge the Japanese flyweight title in 1997, but sustained an injury in the 3rd round, and was unable to capture the title. He challenged the title again in April 1998, losing by 10-round decision, but finally won the title in September of the same year, winning the decision. He defended the title four times from 1998 to 2000.

In August 2000, Kobayashi made his first attempt at the world title against Malcolm Tunacao for the WBC Flyweight title. The fight was a draw, and the champion, Tunacao, retained the title. Kobayashi made his second try for the world title in March 2001, challenging Leo Gamez for the WBA Super flyweight title. He won by TKO in the 10th round, having dominated Gamez for the entire fight.

Kobayashi made his first defense in September 2001, winning by split decision. He fought Alexander Muñoz (undefeated in 21 fights, all won by KO) in March 2002, for his second defense, and lost by TKO in the 8th round to lose his title.

After his loss to Munoz, Kobayashi declined an offer to challenge Masamori Tokuyama for the WBC Super flyweight title, and retired from boxing in July 2002.

== Professional boxing record ==
32 fights	24 wins	5 losses
By knockout	14	1
By decision	10	4
Draws	3	

No.	Result	Record	Opponent	Type	Round, time	Date	Location	Notes
32	Loss	24–5–3	Alexander Muñoz	TKO	8 (12)	2002-03-09	Nippon Budokan, Tokyo, Japan	Lost WBA super flyweight title
31	Win	24–4–3	Jesús Rojas	SD	12 (12)	2001-09-01	Arena, Yokohama, Japan	Retained WBA super flyweight title
30	Win	23–4–3	Leo Gámez	TKO	10 (12)	2001-03-11	Arena, Yokohama, Japan	Won WBA super flyweight title
29	Draw	22–4–3	Malcolm Tuñacao	SD	12 (12)	2000-08-20	Kokugikan, Tokyo, Japan	For WBC flyweight title
28	Win	22–4–2	Hayato Asai	TKO	7 (10)	2000-04-02	Korakuen Hall, Tokyo, Japan	Retained Japanese flyweight title
27	Win	21–4–2	Katsuhiro Akita	PTS	10 (10)	1999-11-07	Kokugikan, Tokyo, Japan	Retained Japanese flyweight title
26	Win	20–4–2	Shin Terao	TKO	9 (10)	1999-07-03	Japan	Retained Japanese flyweight title
25	Win	19–4–2	Hideyasu Ishihara	TKO	7 (10)	1999-03-06	Korakuen Hall, Tokyo, Japan	Retained Japanese flyweight title
24	Win	18–4–2	Nolito Cabato	MD	10 (10)	1998-09-30	Japan	Won Japanese flyweight title
23	Win	17–4–2	Hiroshi Kobayashi	PTS	10 (10)	1998-07-04	Japan	
22	Loss	16–4–2	Nolito Cabato	SD	10 (10)	1998-04-04	Korakuen Hall, Tokyo, Japan	For Japanese flyweight title
21	Win	16–3–2	Jojo Torres	KO	2 (10)	1997-11-11	Korakuen Hall, Tokyo, Japan	
20	Draw	15–3–2	Nolito Cabato	TD	3 (10)	1997-09-13	Matsumoto, Japan	For Japanese flyweight title
19	Win	15–3–1	Jun Lansaderas	KO	6 (?)	1997-05-16	Japan	
18	Win	14–3–1	Marlon Terado	KO	1 (?)	1997-03-10	Japan	
17	Loss	13–3–1	Kazuhiro Ryuko	PTS	8 (8)	1996-11-22	Japan	
16	Win	13–2–1	Eiji Shigeyasu	PTS	6 (6)	1996-07-31	Japan	
15	Win	12–2–1	Christopher Saguid	TKO	9 (?)	1996-05-03	Japan	
14	Win	11–2–1	Makoto Soto	PTS	8 (8)	1996-02-03	Japan	
13	Win	10–2–1	Seiji Iwaisako	TKO	6 (?)	1995-10-20	Japan	
12	Win	9–2–1	Makoto Irie	PTS	5 (5)	1995-08-05	Japan	
11	Win	8–2–1	Ryo Kurushima	PTS	5 (5)	1995-06-03	Korakuen Hall, Tokyo, Japan	
10	Draw	7–2–1	Akira Taiga	PTS	6 (6)	1994-12-17	Japan	
9	Win	7–2	Motonari Kashima	PTS	4 (4)	1994-11-11	Japan	
8	Win	6–2	Takeshi Miyamoto	KO	3 (4)	1994-10-11	Japan	
7	Win	5–2	Shiro Arai	KO	1 (4)	1994-09-02	Japan	
6	Win	4–2	Toshihiro Matsuoka	KO	2 (?)	1994-03-05	Japan	
5	Loss	3–2	Yoshimasa Kiyota	PTS	4 (4)	1993-09-16	Japan	
4	Win	3–1	Takiji Kiyokawa	KO	1 (?)	1993-07-15	Japan	
3	Win	2–1	Hiroyuki Ida	PTS	4 (4)	1993-04-03	Japan	
2	Win	1–1	Takiji Kiyokawa	KO	1 (?)	1992-12-01	Japan	
1	Loss	0–1	Isao Mori	PTS	4 (4)	1992-04-17	Japan	

== Post-retirement ==
Kobayashi worked briefly as a trainer for his former gym before creating the "Celes Kobayashi Boxing Gym" in Chiba, Japan. He frequently appears as a commentator in Japan for boxing title matches.

== See also ==
- List of southpaw stance boxers
- Boxing in Japan
- List of Japanese boxing world champions
- List of world super-flyweight boxing champions

Sporting positions
Regional boxing titles
Preceded by Nolito Cabato	Japanese flyweight champion September 30, 1998 – 2000; Vacated	Vacant Title next held by Takefumi Sakata
World boxing titles
Preceded by Leo Gámez	WBA super flyweight champion March 11, 2001 – March 9, 2002	Succeeded by Alexander Muñoz
