= Cho In-joo =

South Korean boxer (born 1969)

In-Joo Cho
Personal information
- Nationality: South Korean
- Born: Cho In-joo; April 13, 1969 (age 57) Muan County, South Korea
- Height: 5 ft 7 1/2 in (171 cm)
- Weight: Super flyweight

Boxing career
- Stance: Orthodox

Boxing record
- Total fights: 20
- Wins: 18
- Win by KO: 7
- Losses: 2

In-Joo Cho (Korean: 조인주; Hanja: 曺仁柱; born April 13, 1969 in Damyang, South Jeolla Province, South Korea) is a former boxer from South Korea. He held the WBC and Lineal Super flyweight titles.

== Amateur career ==
In 1987, Oh won the gold medal in flyweight at the World Junior Amateur Boxing Championships held in.

== Professional career ==
Cho turned professional in 1992 and compiled a record of 12–0 before facing and defeating Gerry Peñalosa to win the WBC super flyweight title. He would go on to defend the title five times before losing the title to Masamori Tokuyama via unanimous decision.

== Professional boxing record ==
20 fights	18 wins	2 losses
By knockout	7	1
By decision	11	1

No.	Result	Record	Opponent	Type	Round, time	Date	Location	Notes
20	Loss	18–2	Masamori Tokuyama	KO	5 (12)	2001-05-20	Sheraton Walker Hill Hotel, Seoul, South Korea	For WBC super flyweight title
19	Loss	18–1	Masamori Tokuyama	UD	12 (12)	2000-08-27	Prefectural Gymnasium, Osaka, Japan	Lost WBC super flyweight title
18	Win	18–0	Julio Cesar Avila	UD	12 (12)	2000-05-14	Sheraton Walker Hill Hotel, Seoul, South Korea	Retained WBC super flyweight title
17	Win	17–0	Gerry Peñalosa	SD	12 (12)	2000-01-02	Sheraton Walker Hill Hotel, Seoul, South Korea	Retained WBC super flyweight title
16	Win	16–0	Keiji Yamaguchi	UD	12 (12)	1999-09-05	Kokugikan, Tokyo, Japan	Retained WBC super flyweight title
15	Win	15–0	Pone Saengmorakot	KO	8 (12)	1999-06-13	Sheraton Walker Hill Hotel, Seoul, South Korea	Retained WBC super flyweight title
14	Win	14–0	Joel Luna Zárate	MD	12 (12)	1999-01-10	Ritz Carlton Hotel, Seoul, South Korea	Retained WBC super flyweight title
13	Win	13–0	Gerry Peñalosa	SD	12 (12)	1998-08-29	Ritz Carlton Hotel, Seoul, South Korea	Won WBC super flyweight title
12	Win	12–0	Tanpit Sithchula	KO	2 (10)	1998-01-23	Guri Gymnasium, Guri, South Korea	
11	Win	11–0	Aidos Yeraliyev	KO	7 (10)	1997-06-27	Pupeung, South Korea	
10	Win	10–0	Vadim Safin	PTS	10 (10)	1996-11-22	Seoul, South Korea	
9	Win	9–0	Boyet Nice	KO	3 (10)	1996-09-20	Junggu Hall, Seoul, South Korea	
8	Win	8–0	Hiroaki Fukumoto	PTS	10 (10)	1995-04-23	Seoul, South Korea	
7	Win	7–0	Mario Parcon	KO	5 (10)	1995-02-08	Seoul, South Korea	
6	Win	6–0	Tacy Macalos	PTS	10 (10)	1994-01-30	Prince Hotel, Daegu, South Korea	
5	Win	5–0	Reynante Jamili	PTS	10 (10)	1993-10-23	Seoul, South Korea	
4	Win	4–0	Abraham Torres	PTS	10 (10)	1993-06-06	Hyeonpung Citizen Hall, Daegu, South Korea	
3	Win	3–0	Jongjong Perez	KO	1 (8)	1993-01-31	Pohang Gymnasium, Pohang, South Korea	
2	Win	2–0	Lito Gonzaga	PTS	10 (10)	1992-09-27	Wongwang University, Iksan, South Korea	
1	Win	1–0	Rodrigo Boy Louperez	KO	4 (8)	1992-04-18	Munhwa Gymnasium, Seoul, South Korea	

== See also ==
- List of Korean boxers
- Lineal championship
- List of world super-flyweight boxing champions

Sporting positions
World boxing titles
Preceded by Gerry Peñalosa	WBC super-flyweight champion August 29, 1998 – August 27, 2000	Succeeded by Masamori Tokuyama
