= Alexander Muñoz =

Venezuelan boxer (born 1979)

Personal information
- Nickname: El Explosivo
- Born: Alexander Jose Muñoz; February 8, 1979 (age 47) San Félix, Venezuela
- Height: 5 ft 5 1/2 in (166 cm)
- Weight: Super flyweight; Bantamweight; Super bantamweight

Boxing career
- Reach: 68 1/2 in (174 cm)
- Stance: Orthodox

Boxing record
- Total fights: 51
- Wins: 41
- Win by KO: 31
- Losses: 10

Alexander Muñoz (born February 8, 1979) is a Venezuelan professional boxer who has held the WBA super flyweight title twice; from 2002 to 2004, and from 2007 to 2008. He also challenged for the WBA bantamweight title in 2010. Muñoz's strong punching power earned him the nickname of "El Explosivo"; to date, 79% of his wins have come via knockout.

== Boxing career ==
Munoz had an outstanding amateur career, compiling a record of 163 wins, 9 losses, and 129 knockouts in 172 bouts. Munoz turned professional in 1998 and captured the WBA super flyweight title with an 8th-round TKO win over Celes Kobayashi in 2002. He defended the title three times before losing by a split decision to Martín Castillo on December 3, 2004.

He recaptured the belt on May 3, 2007, with a unanimous decision win over Nobuo Nashiro. On January 14, 2008, Muñoz defended his belt by against Katsushige Kawashima, a former WBC super flyweight champion, in a similar way.

On May 17, 2008, Muñoz lost to WBC champion Cristian Mijares via a split decision in a unification bout. Mijares then became WBA super champion.

== Professional boxing record ==
51 fights	41 wins	10 losses
By knockout	31	5
By decision	10	5

No.	Result	Record	Opponent	Type	Round, time	Date	Location	Notes
51	Win	41–10	Freddy Beleno	UD	10 (10)	2019-10-12	Discoteca Cataleya, El Dorado, Venezuela	
50	Loss	40–10	Samuel Molina	KO	1 (8)	2019-07-06	Club Saga Heredia, Málaga, Spain	
49	Loss	40–9	Evgeny Chuprakov	TKO	9 (10)	2019-05-18	RCC Boxing Academy, Yekaterinburg, Russia	
48	Loss	40–8	Karim Arce Lugo	UD	8 (8)	2018-09-01	Palenque de la Expo, Ciudad Obregón, Mexico	
47	Win	40–7	Freddy Beleno	UD	10 (10)	2018-05-05	Gimnasio Alexander Muñoz, San Félix, Venezuela	
46	Win	39–7	Dallan Llovera	RTD	4 (8)	2018-02-10	Gimnasio Mocho Navas, Petare, Venezuela	
45	Loss	38–7	Rey Vargas	TKO	5 (12)	2016-09-03	Deportivo Zaragoza, Atizapán de Zaragoza, Mexico	For vacant WBC International Silver super-bantamweight title
44	Win	38–6	Guillermo Ortiz	TKO	4 (6)	2016-05-14	Plaza 101, Managua, Nicaragua	
43	Win	37–6	Luis Alberto Zarraga	TKO	7 (10)	2014-10-11	Polideportivo de Corinsa, Cagua, Venezuela	
42	Loss	36–6	Genesis Servania	TKO	12 (12)	2014-03-01	Solaire Resort & Casino, Parañaque, Philippines	For vacant WBO Inter-Continental super-bantamweight title
41	Loss	36–5	Léo Santa Cruz	TKO	5 (10)	2013-05-04	MGM Grand Garden Arena, Paradise, Nevada, U.S.	For vacant USBA super-bantamweight title
40	Win	36–4	Ever Garcia Hernandez	TKO	6 (10)	2012-11-18	Parque Naciones Unidas, Caracas, Venezuela	
39	Loss	35–4	Kōki Kameda	UD	12 (12)	2010-12-26	Super Arena, Saitama, Japan	For vacant (Regular) WBA bantamweight title
38	Win	35–3	Leopoldo Arrocha	MD	8 (8)	2010-10-02	Gimnasio Nuevo Panama, Panama City, Panama	
37	Win	34–3	Félix Machado	UD	10 (10)	2009-11-07	El Domo Jose Maria Vargas, Maiquetía, Venezuela	
36	Win	33–3	Breilor Teran	UD	10 (10)	2009-07-18	El Domo Jose Maria Vargas, Maiquetía, Venezuela	
35	Loss	32–3	Cristian Mijares	SD	12 (12)	2008-05-17	Auditorio Centenario, Gómez Palacio, Mexico	For WBA (Super) & WBC super-flyweight titles
34	Win	32–2	Katsushige Kawashima	UD	12 (12)	2008-01-14	Bunka Gym, Yokohama, Japan	Retained WBA super-flyweight title
33	Win	31–2	Kuniyuki Aizawa	UD	12 (12)	2007-09-24	Korakuen Hall, Tokyo, Japan	Retained WBA super-flyweight title
32	Win	30–2	Nobuo Nashiro	UD	12 (12)	2007-05-03	Ariake Coliseum, Tokyo, Japan	Won WBA super-flyweight title
31	Win	29–2	Luis Trejo	KO	5 (10)	2006-11-27	Parque Naciones Unidas, Caracas, Venezuela	
30	Loss	28–2	Martín Castillo	SD	12 (12)	2006-01-21	Thomas & Mack Center, Paradise, Nevada, U.S.	For WBA super-flyweight title
29	Win	28–1	Adolfo Ramos	KO	1 (10)	2005-08-13	Circulo Militar, Maracay, Venezuela	
28	Win	27–1	Julio David Roque Ler	UD	12 (12)	2005-05-26	Estadio Luna Park, Buenos Aires, Argentina	Won vacant WBA Fedelatin super-flyweight title
27	Win	26–1	Over Bolanos	KO	2 (10)	2005-03-19	Centro Recreacional Yesterday, Turmero, Venezuela	
26	Loss	25–1	Martín Castillo	UD	12 (12)	2004-12-03	Entertainment Center, Laredo, Texas, U.S.	Lost WBA super-flyweight title
25	Win	25–0	Eiji Kojima	TKO	10 (12)	2004-01-03	Central Gym, Osaka, Japan	Retained WBA super-flyweight title
24	Win	24–0	Hidenobu Honda	UD	12 (12)	2003-10-04	Kokugikan, Tokyo, Japan	Retained WBA super-flyweight title
23	Win	23–0	Eiji Kojima	KO	2 (12)	2002-07-31	Prefectural Gymnasium, Osaka, Japan	Retained WBA super-flyweight title
22	Win	22–0	Celes Kobayashi	TKO	8 (12)	2002-03-09	Nippon Budokan, Tokyo, Japan	Won WBA super-flyweight title
21	Win	21–0	Hernan Berrio Cardenas	KO	3 (10)	2001-12-21	Turmero, Venezuela	
20	Win	20–0	John Ortiz	KO	3 (?)	2001-11-12	Turmero, Venezuela	
19	Win	19–0	Pedro Medrano	KO	1 (?)	2001-07-07	Turmero, Venezuela	
18	Win	18–0	Oberto Flores	TKO	3 (?)	2001-03-19	El Paraíso, Venezuela	
17	Win	17–0	Sornpichai Kratingdaenggym	RTD	5 (10)	2000-12-16	Bicentenary University Forum, Maracay, Venezuela	
16	Win	16–0	Felix Bracho	KO	3 (?)	2000-10-31	Turmero, Venezuela	
15	Win	15–0	Saul Guaza	TKO	10 (10)	2000-07-28	Turmero, Venezuela	
14	Win	14–0	Benjamin Rivas	KO	1 (10)	2000-07-18	Luis Navarro Gym, Los Teques, Venezuela	
13	Win	13–0	Euclides Bolivar	TKO	3 (?)	2000-05-25	Maturín, Venezuela	
12	Win	12–0	Victoriano Hernandez	TKO	3 (?)	2000-04-15	Turmero, Venezuela	
11	Win	11–0	John Ortiz	TKO	2 (?)	2000-04-01	Cumaná, Venezuela	
10	Win	10–0	Jesus Rattia	TKO	6 (?)	1999-12-04	Cumaná, Venezuela	
9	Win	9–0	Benjamin Rivas	KO	6 (8)	1999-11-06	Polideportivo Galapa, Barranquilla, Colombia	
8	Win	8–0	Vicente Rivera	TKO	3 (?)	1999-10-31	Carrizal, Venezuela	
7	Win	7–0	Ramon Gamez	TKO	10 (?)	1999-07-31	Turmero, Venezuela	
6	Win	6–0	Said Barrios	KO	1 (?)	1999-06-19	Caracas, Venezuela	
5	Win	5–0	Jose Arroyo	TKO	3 (?)	1999-05-28	Cumaná, Venezuela	
4	Win	4–0	Fernando Guevara	TKO	1 (6)	1999-03-13	Ocumare del Tuy, Venezuela	
3	Win	3–0	Andres Medina	TKO	2 (?)	1998-11-24	Los Teques, Venezuela	
2	Win	2–0	Andres Medina	TKO	3 (?)	1998-10-27	Los Teques, Venezuela	
1	Win	1–0	Alexander Granadillo	TKO	3 (?)	1998-10-03	Gimnasio José Beracasa, Caracas, Venezuela	

== See also ==
- List of world super-flyweight boxing champions

Sporting positions
Regional boxing titles
Vacant Title last held by Luis Alberto Pérez	WBA Fedelatin super-flyweight champion May 26, 2005 – 2005; Vacated	Vacant Title next held by Cristian Mijares
World boxing titles
Preceded by Celes Kobayashi	WBA super-flyweight champion March 9, 2002 – December 3, 2004	Succeeded by Martín Castillo
Preceded by Nobuo Nashiro	WBA super-flyweight champion May 3, 2007 – May 17, 2008; Lost bid for Super title	Vacant Title next held by Nobuo Nashiro as Regular champion
