= Katsushige Kawashima =

Japanese boxer (born 1974)

Personal information
- Nationality: (Japan) Japanese
- Born: Katsushige Kawashima; October 6, 1974 (age 51) Ichihara, Chiba, Japan
- Weight: Super flyweight

Boxing career
- Stance: Orthodox

Boxing record
- Total fights: 39
- Wins: 32
- Win by KO: 21
- Losses: 7

Katsushige Kawashima (川嶋勝重, Kawashima Katsushige; born October 6, 1974, in Ichihara, Chiba) is a Japanese retired professional boxer who fought in the super flyweight division. He is a former WBC and lineal super flyweight champion.

== Biography ==
Kawashima joined the boxing gym of former WBC and WBA minimumweight champion Hideyuki Ohashi in 1995, and made his professional debut on February 20, 1997, with a 2nd round knockout victory. He lost a 6-round decision in only his 6th professional fight, but steadily compiled wins to challenge Jesse Maca for the OPBF super flyweight title on December 11, 2000. The bout resulted in a 12-round unanimous decision loss for Kawashima.

Kawashima first entered the WBC rankings in 2001 with a 10-round decision victory over former WBA super flyweight champion Yokthai Sithoar. He challenged the Japanese super flyweight title the following year, and won his first title by split decision over 10 rounds. He defended the title once before returning it.

On June 23, 2003, Kawashima got his first shot at a world title against WBC and lineal super flyweight champion Masamori Tokuyama, but lost by unanimous decision over 12 rounds. He challenged Tokuyama for the second time a year later on June 28, 2004, and scored a surprising 1st round knockout only 1 minute and 47 seconds into the bout to win the super flyweight crown. Tokuyama had defended the title 9 times before this loss.

Kawashima scored three knockdowns en route to a unanimous decision victory in his first world title defense on September 20, 2004. On January 3, 2005, he fought undefeated Jose Navarro for his second defense, and won a controversial split decision to retain his title. One judge had scored 11 of 12 rounds in favor of Navarro, while the other two scored it closely in favor of Kawashima, who was cut over both eyes for most of the fight.

Kawashima met Masamori Tokuyama for the third time on July 18, 2005, for his third defense of the world title. Kawashima managed to knockdown Tokuyama in the 12th round, but was unable to mount a consistent offense for the rest of the fight as Tokuyama regained his title by unanimous decision.

On September 18, 2006, Kawashima fought Cristian Mijares for the WBC super flyweight interim title. He managed to knock down his opponent in the 2nd round, but lost a close split decision where two judges scored the fight for Mijares by only one point (114-113), and the other judge scored the fight for Kawashima also by one point. He announced his retirement shortly afterwards, but retracted it on October 19, 2006, when a rematch was organized against Mijares, who had recently been promoted to the regular champion after the retirement of Masamori Tokuyama. The rematch was held on January 3, 2007, and Kawashima lost by technical knockout in the tenth round after suffering a knockdown which was regarded as a slip by the referee. This was the first time Kawashima had been knocked out in his entire career.

Kawashima announced his retirement for the second time after the second loss to Mijares, but returned to the ring with a 3rd round knockout win on June 4, 2007. He challenged WBA super flyweight champion Alexander Muñoz as the 7th ranked contender to the title on January 14, 2008, but lost a unanimous decision where he was almost knocked out in the 11th round. He announced his retirement for the third time after the fight. His professional record was 32-7-0 (21KOs).

== Professional boxing record ==
| 39 fights | 32 wins | 7 losses |
|---|---|---|
| By knockout | 21 | 1 |
| By decision | 11 | 6 |

| No. | Result | Record | Opponent | Type | Round(s), time | Date | Age | Location | Notes |
|---|---|---|---|---|---|---|---|---|---|
| 39 | Loss | 32–7 | Alexander Muñoz | UD | 12 | Jan 14, 2008 | 33 years, 100 days | Bunka Gym, Yokohama, Tokyo, Japan | For WBA super flyweight title |
| 38 | Win | 32–6 | Adi Wiguna | UD | 10 | Sep 5, 2007 | 32 years, 334 days | Bunka Gym, Yokohama, Tokyo, Japan | |
| 37 | Win | 31–6 | Jae Sung Myung | KO | 3 (8), 1:39 | Jun 4, 2007 | 32 years, 241 days | Ariake Colosseum, Tokyo, Japan | |
| 36 | Loss | 30–6 | Cristian Mijares | TKO | 10 (12), 1:05 | Jan 3, 2007 | 32 years, 89 days | Ariake Colosseum, Tokyo, Japan | For WBC super flyweight title |
| 35 | Loss | 30–5 | Cristian Mijares | SD | 12 | Sep 18, 2006 | 31 years, 347 days | Pacifico, Yokohama, Kanagawa, Japan | For WBC interim super flyweight title |
| 34 | Win | 30–4 | Jae Choon Moon | TKO | 8 (10), 2:22 | Apr 3, 2006 | 31 years, 179 days | Bunka Gym, Yokohama, Kanagawa, Japan | |
| 33 | Win | 29–4 | Petchklongphai Sor Thantip | TKO | 5 (10), 2:21 | Jan 9, 2006 | 31 years, 95 days | Pacifico, Yokohama, Kanagawa, Japan | |
| 32 | Loss | 28–4 | Masamori Tokuyama | UD | 12 | Jul 18, 2005 | 30 years, 285 days | Central Gym, Osaka, Osaka, Japan | Lost WBC super flyweight title |
| 31 | Win | 28–3 | José Navarro | SD | 12 | Jan 3, 2005 | 30 years, 89 days | Ariake Colosseum, Tokyo, Japan | Retained WBC super flyweight title |
| 30 | Win | 27–3 | Raul Juarez | UD | 12 | Sep 20, 2004 | 29 years, 350 days | Bunka Gym, Yokohama, Kanagawa, Japan | Retained WBC super flyweight title |
| 29 | Win | 26–3 | Masamori Tokuyama | TKO | 1 (12), 1:47 | Jun 28, 2004 | 29 years, 266 days | Arena, Yokohama, Kanagawa, Japan | Won WBC super flyweight title |
| 28 | Win | 25–3 | Den Sithnaruepol | KO | 2 (10), 1:23 | Jan 15, 2004 | 29 years, 101 days | Bunka Gym, Yokohama, Kanagawa, Japan | |
| 27 | Win | 24–3 | Ho Sub Noh | UD | 10 | Oct 18, 2003 | 29 years, 12 days | Korakuen Hall, Tokyo, Japan | |
| 26 | Loss | 23–3 | Masamori Tokuyama | UD | 12 | Jun 23, 2003 | 28 years, 260 days | Arena, Yokohama, Kanagawa, Japan | For WBC super flyweight title |
| 25 | Win | 23–2 | Sakmongkol Singmanasak | KO | 2 (10), 2:26 | Dec 18, 2002 | 28 years, 73 days | Bunka Gym, Yokohama, Kanagawa, Japan | |
| 24 | Win | 22–2 | Yasutomo Yuki | TKO | 5 (10), 2:34 | Jul 30, 2002 | 27 years, 297 days | Korakuen Hall, Tokyo, Japan | Retained Japanese super flyweight title |
| 23 | Win | 21–2 | Shingo Sasaki | SD | 10 | Apr 20, 2002 | 27 years, 196 days | Korakuen Hall, Tokyo, Japan | Won Japanese super flyweight title |
| 22 | Win | 20–2 | Singhdam Kiatwisak | KO | 4 (10), 2:04 | Dec 4, 2001 | 27 years, 59 days | Korakuen Hall, Tokyo, Japan | |
| 21 | Win | 19–2 | Yokthai Sithoar | UD | 10 | Aug 27, 2001 | 26 years, 325 days | Bunka Gym, Yokohama, Kanagawa, Japan | |
| 20 | Win | 18–2 | Phonthep Satburanasin | TKO | 2 (10), 2:22 | Mar 27, 2001 | 26 years, 172 days | Korakuen Hall, Tokyo, Japan | |
| 19 | Loss | 17–2 | Jess Maca | UD | 12 | Dec 11, 2000 | 26 years, 66 days | Korakuen Hall, Tokyo, Japan | For OPBF bantamweight title |
| 18 | Win | 17–1 | Arashi Yanagawa | TKO | 7 (10), 2:50 | Oct 19, 2000 | 26 years, 13 days | Bunka Gym, Yokohama, Kanagawa, Japan | |
| 17 | Win | 16–1 | Yuji Nagai | UD | 10 | Jun 27, 2000 | 25 years, 265 days | Korakuen Hall, Tokyo, Japan | |
| 16 | Win | 15–1 | Sann Sithnarupol | KO | 2 (10), 0:49 | Mar 23, 2000 | 25 years, 169 days | Korakuen Hall, Tokyo, Japan | |
| 15 | Win | 14–1 | Edwin Gastador | KO | 3 (8) | Nov 2, 1999 | 25 years, 27 days | Korakuen Hall, Tokyo, Japan | |
| 14 | Win | 13–1 | Rolando Dusaran | KO | 4 (10), 1:41 | Aug 3, 1999 | 24 years, 301 days | Korakuen Hall, Tokyo, Japan | |
| 13 | Win | 12–1 | Napa Kiatwanchai | RTD | 5 (10), 3:00 | Apr 28, 1999 | 24 years, 204 days | Bunka Gym, Yokohama, Kanagawa, Japan | |
| 12 | Win | 11–1 | Jang Bok Kim | UD | 8 | Jan 30, 1999 | 24 years, 116 days | Bunka Gym, Yokohama, Kanagawa, Japan | |
| 11 | Win | 10–1 | Masahide Kaneda | TKO | 6 (6), 1:49 | Oct 23, 1998 | 24 years, 17 days | Korakuen Hall, Tokyo, Japan | |
| 10 | Win | 9–1 | Yoshikazu Matsushita | PTS | 5 | Jul 16, 1998 | 23 years, 283 days | Bunka Gym, Yokohama, Kanagawa, Japan | |
| 9 | Win | 8–1 | Tsukasa Kimura | KO | 3 (5), 2:39 | Jun 22, 1998 | 23 years, 259 days | Korakuen Hall, Tokyo, Japan | |
| 8 | Win | 7–1 | Naoki Kamata | TKO | 3 (5), 2:40 | May 8, 1998 | 23 years, 214 days | Korakuen Hall, Tokyo, Japan | |
| 7 | Win | 6–1 | Kenji Sasaki | KO | 1 (6), 2:39 | Mar 24, 1998 | 23 years, 169 days | Korakuen Hall, Tokyo, Japan | |
| 6 | Loss | 5–1 | Hiroshi Nakano | PTS | 6 | Dec 20, 1997 | 23 years, 75 days | Korakuen Hall, Tokyo, Japan | |
| 5 | Win | 5–0 | Hitoshi Takahashi | PTS | 6 | Nov 8, 1997 | 23 years, 33 days | Korakuen Hall, Tokyo, Japan | |
| 4 | Win | 4–0 | Shigeru Morimoto | KO | 4 (4), 0:51 | Sep 30, 1997 | 22 years, 359 days | Korakuen Hall, Tokyo, Japan | |
| 3 | Win | 3–0 | Shohei Kume | PTS | 4 | Aug 4, 1997 | 22 years, 302 days | Korakuen Hall, Tokyo, Japan | |
| 2 | Win | 2–0 | Nobuhiko Yoshida | KO | 2 (4), 1:45 | May 30, 1997 | 22 years, 236 days | Sogo Department Store, Yokohama, Kanagawa, Japan | |
| 1 | Win | 1–0 | Shinobu Hiraga | KO | 2 (4), 1:10 | Feb 20, 1997 | 22 years, 137 days | Kokugikan, Tokyo, Japan | |

== See also ==
- List of super flyweight boxing champions
- List of WBC world champions
- List of Japanese boxing world champions
- Boxing in Japan

Achievements
| Preceded by Masamori Tokuyama | WBC super flyweight champion June 28, 2004–July 18, 2005 | Succeeded by Masamori Tokuyama |
| Preceded by Masamori Tokuyama | Lineal super flyweight champion June 28, 2004–July 18, 2005 | Succeeded by Masamori Tokuyama |
