= Lito Sisnorio =

Filipino boxer

Angelito "Lito" Sisnorio Jr. (October 10, 1982 – April 1, 2007) was a Filipino World Boxing Council youth flyweight champion boxer who died following a controversial boxing match in Thailand in April 2007. The controversy over the match arose from the fact that Sisnorio's role in the fight was not officially sanctioned by the Philippine Games and Amusement Board. He reportedly sustained brain injuries during the fight on March 31, 2007, which he lost by knockout to Thai boxer Chatchai Sasakul. Following unsuccessful brain surgery, he was pronounced dead at Piyamin Hospital in Thailand at 9:15 pm, April 1, 2007.

His death prompted the Philippine Games and Amusement Board to ban all fights involving Filipino boxers in Thailand starting April 2007.
