= Gerry Peñalosa =

Filipino boxer

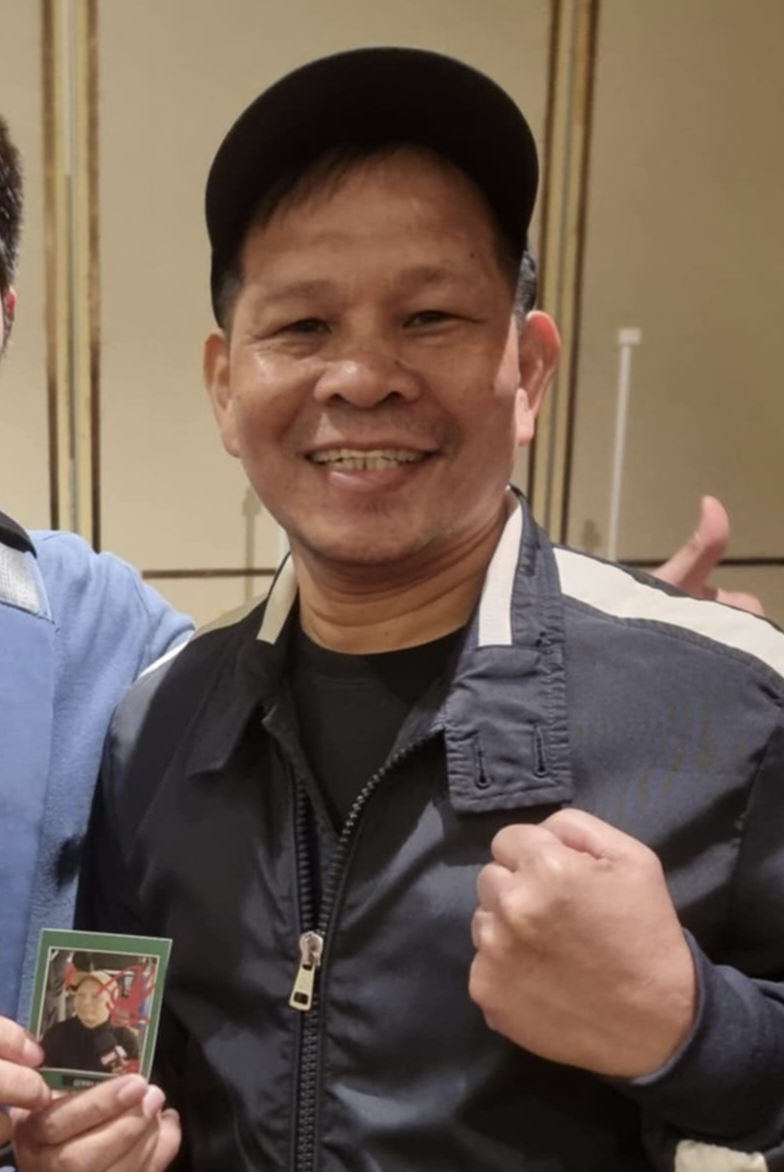
- Peñalosa in 2025

Personal information
- Nickname: Fearless
- Born: Geronimo J. Peñalosa; August 7, 1972 (age 54) San Carlos, Negros Occidental, Philippines
- Height: 5 ft 4 in (163 cm)
- Weight: Light-flyweight; Super-flyweight; Bantamweight; Super-bantamweight

Boxing career
- Reach: 65 in (165 cm)
- Stance: Southpaw

Boxing record
- Total fights: 65
- Wins: 55
- Win by KO: 37
- Losses: 8
- Draws: 2

Geronimo "Gerry" J. Peñalosa (born August 7, 1972) is a Filipino boxing promoter and former professional boxer who competed from 1989 to 2010. He is a two-weight world champion, having held the World Boxing Council (WBC) super-flyweight title from 1997 to 1998, and the World Boxing Organization (WBO) bantamweight title from 2007 to 2009. Originally from the city of San Carlos, Negros Occidental, Peñalosa currently resides in Manila. He was trained mainly by Freddie Roach and went on to become a boxing trainer and a promoter himself after retirement. Peñalosa's older brother, Dodie Boy Peñalosa, who is also a former boxer and world champion.

== Professional career ==
=== Early years at flyweight ===
Peñalosa turned professional in 1989. He made his debut against Fidel Jubay on May 20, 1989, and won the bout by knockout.

=== Super flyweight ===
He captured the WBC and lineal super flyweight title with a decision win over Hiroshi Kawashima on 27 February 1997 and has defended the title three times since then.

He later lost it on points to In-Joo Cho on 29 August 1998. Two years later, he had a rematch with Cho to regain the title but again lost by controversial unanimous decision.

=== Retirement and comeback ===
On 24 September 2001, he challenged Masamori Tokuyama who then succeeded Cho in being the WBC super flyweight champion. However, he lost by another controversial split decision. The two fought again on 20 December 2002 but the result was the same, in Tokuyama's favor. Peñalosa temporarily retired that year.

Peñalosa returned to boxing two years later. He defeated Bangsaen Sithpraprom for the World Boxing Foundation (WBFo) super flyweight title on 7 November 2004.

=== Super bantamweight ===
On 17 March 2007, he took on Daniel Ponce de León who then held the WBO super bantamweight title. In the fight, Peñalosa displayed his intelligence, excellent boxing skills and defensive abilities. De León who is a knockout artist could not land a clear punch on Peñalosa. Peñalosa answered with stinging counters that frustrated De Leon. Although De Leon was the busier boxer, most of his punches landed in the air and on Peñalosa's gloves. However, De Leon won via unanimous decision.

=== Return to bantamweight ===
==== WBO champion ====
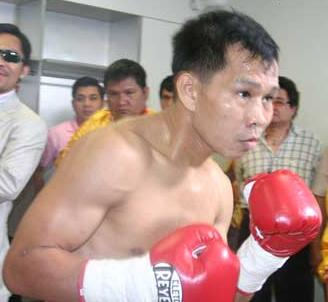
Penalosa in 2008.

On August 11, 2007, the veteran Filipino boxer took on Jhonny González of Mexico for the WBO bantamweight title at the Arco Arena in Sacramento, California, California. Peñalosa went down in weight and dethroned the Mexican fighter at the 7th round.

The younger fighter appeared to be in control of the match in the early rounds, as he skillfully kept the much shorter Peñalosa away with crisp jabs. Peñalosa stayed patient and continued to walk forward even though he is getting hit by some of the Mexican's punches. In the seventh round, Peñalosa got an opportunity, when Gonzales launched a strong right that missed Peñalosa head. Gonzalez failed to pull his arm back quickly and at that short moment, leaving a hole for the veteran fighter, who then threw a precise and solid left hook to Gonzalez' body. The defending champion fell on the canvas a few moments after receiving the counter-attack; the Mexican tried to get up and fight again but failed to do it remained down on the canvas. This was Peñalosa's second world title in 10 years.

He defended the title in Quezon City, Philippines by stopping former world title holder Ratanachai Sor Vorapin of Thailand in the eighth round on 6 April 2008.

This was the second time he fought Sor Vorapin in which Peñalosa prevailed on both encounters.

On February 21, 2009, Peñalosa took on German Meraz of Mexico at the Cebu Coliseum in Cebu City, Cebu, Philippines; the two fought in the main event of the "Battle of the Bantamweights" card. The WBO title was not at stake. The Filipino boxer won the fight by unanimous decision after 10 rounds.

==== Events outside the ring ====
After the Manny Pacquiao-Marco Antonio Barrera rematch in Las Vegas, Peñalosa and Jorge Arce of Mexico nearly figured in a fistfight, according to a report by Philboxing.com. The two boxers crossed their way out of the Mandalay Bay Events Center. The boxing website said its sources revealed that it was Arce who challenged Peñalosa to a fight. Peñalosa was reportedly with his wife Goody and Japanese associate Kosuke Washio when the incident happened. Arce was reportedly irritated when one spectator told him upon seeing Peñalosa that the Filipino boxer is more popular than him. The proud Mexican, the report said, apparently did not like the comments and immediately confronted the Filipino world champion. According to the report, Peñalosa was apparently irked by Arce's actuations and tried to follow the Mexican boxer but was prevailed upon by Goody.

=== Super bantamweight ===
He later fought on 25 April 2009, in Puerto Rico against Puerto Rican sensation Juan Manuel López for the WBO Super Bantamweight Championship. The showdown featured as a Champion versus Champion match because the two fighters were both holders of WBO World titles. Peñalosa had the bantamweight title and Lopez had the super bantamweight belt.

Early in the fight, both pugilists exchanged combinations, with López gaining a slight advantage by targeting the head and body of Peñalosa. This pattern continued in the third and fourth rounds, while the challenger continued counterattacking despite receiving more damage. Between the fifth and sixth chapters, both pugilists exchanged combinations, with Peñalosa scoring his most solid punches. During the following two rounds, López managed to establish control of the offensive's tempo, but Peñalosa continued using his counterattack. Prior to the ninth chapter, Peñalosa's trainer, Freddie Roach, warned him that he had to win by knockout or the fight would be stopped. In the round, the pattern continued with few variations, once it was over Roach submitted the fight. With this technical knockout, López became the first boxer to defeat the veteran by knockout.

After the fight, the Filipino boxer said: "He (Lopez) was too big for me. I felt his punches. But I hope he wasn't lying after the fight when he said he felt my punches, too. I was the underdog but I gave it my best. I trained hard for that fight". Then Peñalosa talked about a possible retirement after one last fight, as he wants to hang up his gloves as a champion. Many people, including members of his family and his friend, Manny Pacquiao, wanted Peñalosa to quit boxing already, saying he has nothing more to prove in the sport.

In April, Peñalosa was stripped of his bantamweight title before challenging WBO junior featherweight champion Juan Manuel López.

==== Farewell fights ====
However, Peñalosa decided to fight for one more time. Many tough boxers were considered to be his possible next opponent, including Jorge Arce, Daniel Ponce de Leon, Eric Morel and Vic Darchinyan.

On 13 February 2010, Peñalosa faced Eric Morel (41–2) of Puerto Rico for the interim WBO bantamweight title at the Las Vegas Hilton in Las Vegas, Nevada. The veteran fighter trained at the Wild Card Gym in Los Angeles under the guidance of coach Freddie Roach, along with Filipino prospect Bernabe Concepcion and seven-division world champion Manny Pacquiao. The bout was part of the card named "Pinoy Power 3", in which four other Filipino boxers fought. Peñalosa eventually lost the bout by a controversial Split Decision.

At the opening round the Puerto Rican looked to stick and move while Peñalosa took on the role of the aggressor. In the early rounds Morel appeared a bit more active. Peñalosa received a bad low blow in the 2nd round and was given some time to recover. In the 6th round a clash of heads opened a cut over the Filipino's right eyes; a few moments later, another headbutt opened a severe laceration over Peñalosa's left eye. The injury bled profusely during the next rounds, but he was able to hurt the opponent with strong body punches and seemed to take control of the fight. With the bleeding clearly bothering him, the "Fearless" boxer continued to attack as Morel seemed to keep away from him. Peñalosa continued along this way through the championship rounds, while Morel looked to jab and retreat. During the last rounds, Peñalosa fought hard but apparently hadn't done enough to impress the judges. Two judges scored the fight 115-113 and 116-112 for Morel, while the third and final card scored the bout 113-115 for Peñalosa. FightFan.com had the bout scored 115-113 for Peñalosa. Some people even said that the Filipino boxer should have won over the Puerto Rican, including his trainer, Freddie Roach, and Manny Pacquiao.

Following the fight against Morel, Peñalosa stated that he will fight for one last time against Yodsaenkeng Kietmangmee of Thailand on October 10, 2010. The Filipino pugilist also revealed that the proceeds of this match will be given to Z Gorres to help him with his medical expenses. The event, called "Golpe Golpe na Zamboanga: The Last Hurrah", was held at the Zamboanga City Coliseum. The former world champion won the bout by TKO in the 4th round.

Peñalosa finished his 21-year career with a professional record of 55 wins, with 37 knockouts, 8 losses and 2 draws.

=== Retirement ===
After retiring as a fighter he became a boxing promoter with his nephew, Dave Peñalosa, among the boxers in his stable.

== Personal life ==
On April 21, 2008, Peñalosa won in the Philippine version of Wheel of Fortune, defeating fellow boxers Rey Bautista and Alex John Banal. The prize he earned was worth P159,000 ($3,791).

Peñalosa served as the trainer of IBF flyweight champion Nonito Donaire in 2008.

== Professional boxing record ==
65 fights	55 wins	8 losses
By knockout	37	1
By decision	18	7
Draws	2	

No.	Result	Record	Opponent	Type	Round, time	Date	Location	Notes
65	Win	55–8–2	Anan Saeauy	TKO	4 (10), 1:49	Oct 10, 2010	Mayor Vitaliano D. Agan Coliseum, Zamboanga City, Philippines	
64	Loss	54–8–2	Eric Morel	SD	12	Feb 13, 2010	Las Vegas Hilton, Winchester, Nevada, U.S.	For vacant WBO interim bantamweight title
63	Loss	54–7–2	Juan Manuel López	RTD	10 (12), 0:10	Apr 25, 2009	Coliseo Rubén Rodríguez, Bayamón, Puerto Rico	For WBO super-bantamweight title
62	Win	54–6–2	German Meraz	UD	10	Feb 21, 2009	Cebu Coliseum, Cebu City, Philippines	
61	Win	53–6–2	Chaiya Pothang	TKO	8 (12), 2:31	Apr 6, 2008	Araneta Coliseum, Quezon City, Philippines	Retained WBO bantamweight title
60	Win	52–6–2	Jhonny González	KO	7 (12), 2:45	Aug 11, 2007	ARCO Arena, Sacramento, California, U.S.	Won WBO bantamweight title
59	Loss	51–6–2	Daniel Ponce de León	UD	12	Mar 17, 2007	Mandalay Bay Events Center, Paradise, Nevada, U.S.	For WBO and IBA super-bantamweight titles
58	Win	51–5–2	Mauricio Martínez	TKO	9 (10), 1:05	Oct 21, 2006	Don Haskins Center, El Paso, Texas, U.S.	
57	Win	50–5–2	Tomas Rojas	UD	10	Jul 2, 2006	Araneta Coliseum, Quezon City, Philippines	
56	Win	49–5–2	Feliciano Dario Azuaga	UD	10	Dec 10, 2005	Ynares Center, Antipolo, Philippines	
55	Win	48–5–2	Bangsaen Sithpraprom	KO	7 (12), 1:45	Nov 27, 2004	PAGCOR Grand Theater, Parañaque, Philippines	Won vacant WBF (Foundation) super-flyweight title
54	Win	47–5–2	Samingkao Chutipol	TKO	2 (10), 2:35	Sep 19, 2004	Sports and Cultural Complex, Mandaue, Philippines	
53	Loss	46–5–2	Masamori Tokuyama	SD	12	Dec 20, 2002	Osaka-jō Hall, Osaka, Japan	For WBC super-flyweight title
52	Win	46–4–2	Seiji Tanaka	RTD	7 (12), 3:00	Aug 20, 2002	Neal S. Blaisdell Arena, Honolulu, Hawaii, U.S.	Retained WBC International super-flyweight title
51	Win	45–4–2	Oscar Andrade	UD	12	May 24, 2002	Feather Falls Casino, Oroville, California, U.S.	Won NABF super-flyweight title
50	Win	44–4–2	Joel Avila	TD	8 (12)	Mar 2, 2002	Makati Coliseum, Makati, Philippines	Retained WBC International super-flyweight title
49	Loss	43–4–2	Masamori Tokuyama	UD	12	Sep 24, 2001	Yokohama Arena, Yokohama, Japan	For WBC super-flyweight title
48	Win	43–3–2	Keiji Yamaguchi	TKO	1 (12), 1:33	May 5, 2001	Araneta Coliseum, Quezon City, Philippines	Retained WBC International super-flyweight title
47	Win	42–3–2	Chaiya Pothang	TKO	6 (12)	Nov 25, 2000	PAGCOR Grand Theater, Parañaque, Philippines	Retained WBC International super-flyweight title
46	Win	41–3–2	Pone Saengmorakot	TKO	6 (12)	May 27, 2000	PAGCOR Grand Theater, Parañaque, Philippines	Won vacant WBC International super-flyweight title
45	Loss	40–3–2	In-Joo Cho	SD	12	Jan 2, 2000	Sheraton Grand Walkerhill Hotel, Seoul, South Korea	For WBC super-flyweight title
44	Win	40–2–2	Ramon Jose Hurtado	KO	2 (12), 1:51	Jun 5, 1999	Grand Casino, Biloxi, Mississippi, U.S.	Won vacant WBA–NABA super-flyweight title
43	Loss	39–2–2	In-Joo Cho	SD	12	Aug 29, 1998	Ritz-Carlton Hotel, Seoul, South Korea	Lost WBC super-flyweight title
42	Draw	39–1–2	Joel Luna Zárate	TD	2 (12)	Apr 25, 1998	Cuneta Astrodome, Pasay, Philippines	Retained WBC super-flyweight title
41	Win	39–1–1	Young-Joo Choo	KO	10 (12), 1:15	Nov 23, 1997	Sangmu Gymnasium, Seongnam, South Korea	Retained WBC super-flyweight title
40	Win	38–1–1	Hipolido Saucedo	UD	10	Aug 5, 1997	Foxwoods Resort Casino, Ledyard, Connecticut, U.S.	
39	Win	37–1–1	Seung-Koo Lee	KO	9 (12), 0:56	Jun 14, 1997	Mactan-Benito Ebuen Air Base, Lapu-Lapu, Philippines	Retained WBC super-flyweight title
38	Win	36–1–1	Hiroshi Kawashima	SD	12	Feb 20, 1997	Ryōgoku Kokugikan, Tokyo, Japan	Won WBC super-flyweight title
37	Win	35–1–1	Prasob Jaimuangdalam	KO	5 (10)	Nov 9, 1996	Ninoy Aquino Stadium, Manila, Philippines	
36	Win	34–1–1	Kap-Chul Choi	KO	3	Sep 14, 1996	Mandaue, Philippines	
35	Win	33–1–1	Yun-II Kim	KO	2	May 8, 1996	Naga, Philippines	
34	Win	32–1–1	Inseethong Sorthanikul	KO	2 (10)	Mar 30, 1996	Mandaluyong, Philippines	
33	Win	31–1–1	Jong Keun Lee	KO	2	Nov 11, 1995	Mandaluyong, Philippines	
32	Win	30–1–1	Jae-Chul Han	KO	3	Aug 12, 1995	Cebu Coliseum, Cebu City, Philippines	
31	Win	29–1–1	Rolando Pascua	KO	8 (10)	Apr 8, 1995	Cebu City, Philippines	
30	Win	28–1–1	Suk-Hwi Cho	KO	3	Dec 29, 1994	Manila, Philippines	
29	Win	27–1–1	Steven Togelang	KO	3	Oct 8, 1994	Cebu Coliseum, Cebu City, Philippines	
28	Win	26–1–1	Yun-Sun Baek	TKO	7 (10), 2:07	Jun 3, 1994	Cuneta Astrodome, Pasay, Philippines	
27	Win	25–1–1	In-Man Chang	KO	3	Mar 5, 1994	Naga, Philippines	
26	Win	24–1–1	In-Man Chang	PTS	10	Sep 18, 1993	Cebu City, Philippines	
25	Win	23–1–1	Jesse Maca	UD	10	Apr 24, 1993	Cebu Coliseum, Cebu City, Philippines	
24	Win	22–1–1	Kyung-Seo Koo	KO	3	Feb 20, 1993	Cebu City, Philippines	
23	Win	21–1–1	Rolando Bohol	UD	10	Dec 19, 1992	Aznar Memorial Coliseum, Cebu City, Philippines	
22	Win	20–1–1	Sung-Kuk Kang	KO	5	Oct 30, 1992	Ninoy Aquino Stadium, Manila, Philippines	
21	Loss	19–1–1	Samuel Duran	SD	12	Aug 1, 1992	Cebu City, Philippines	For Philippines Games & Amusement Board (GAB) bantamweight title
20	Win	19–0–1	Jonathan Albay	PTS	10	Jun 13, 1992	Cebu Coliseum, Cebu City, Philippines	
19	Win	18–0–1	Eddie Yabut	PTS	10	Feb 22, 1992	Bacolod, Philippines	
18	Win	17–0–1	Rangga Yuildin	KO	2	Jan 11, 1992	Cebu City, Philippines	
17	Win	16–0–1	Raffy Montalban	TKO	8 (10)	Dec 13, 1991	Rizal Memorial Sports Complex, Manila, Philippines	
16	Win	15–0–1	Roger Vicera	KO	4 (10)	Oct 26, 1991	Cebu City, Philippines	
15	Win	14–0–1	Nolito Cabato	TKO	8	Jul 20, 1991	Manila, Philippines	
14	Win	13–0–1	Elson Duran	KO	4	Jun 1, 1991	Cebu Coliseum, Cebu City, Philippines	
13	Win	12–0–1	Ric Magramo	TKO	5	Jan 19, 1991	Cebu City, Philippines	
12	Win	11–0–1	Bert Refugio	PTS	10	Oct 19, 1990	Araneta Coliseum, Quezon City, Philippines	
11	Draw	10–0–1	Ric Siodora	PTS	10	Jun 23, 1990	Ninoy Aquino Stadium, Manila, Philippines	
10	Win	10–0	Jeung Jae Lee	KO	5	Mar 31, 1990	Araneta Coliseum, Quezon City, Philippines	
9	Win	9–0	Rachmat Basuki	UD	12	Jan 18, 1990	Go Skate Hall, Surabaya, Indonesia	Won vacant IBF Inter-Continental junior-flyweight title
8	Win	8–0	Loloc Elloren	KO	7	Dec 22, 1989	Cebu City, Philippines	
7	Win	7–0	Eldie Paradero	TKO	2 (10)	Nov 11, 1989	Cebu Coliseum, Cebu City, Philippines	
6	Win	6–0	Im-Suk Chang	UD	8	Oct 14, 1989	Hong Kong, SAR	
5	Win	5–0	Pol Cabanes	TKO	7 (10)	Sep 29, 1989	Cebu Coliseum, Cebu City, Philippines	
4	Win	4–0	Eugene Flores	UD	8	Aug 19, 1989	Cebu Coliseum, Cebu City, Philippines	
3	Win	3–0	Bernie Bernardo	UD	8	Aug 4, 1989	Ninoy Aquino Stadium, Manila, Philippines	
2	Win	2–0	Eddie Torres	UD	6	Jun 24, 1989	Rizal Memorial Sports Complex, Manila, Philippines	
1	Win	1–0	Fidel Jubay	TKO	5 (6)	May 20, 1989	Mandaue, Philippines	

== Titles in boxing ==
=== Major world titles ===
- WBC super-flyweight champion (115 lbs)
- WBO bantamweight champion (118 lbs)

=== Minor world titles ===
- WBF (Foundation) super-flyweight champion (115 lbs)

=== Regional/International titles ===
- IBF Inter-Continental junior-flyweight champion (108 lbs)
- NABF super-flyweight champion (115 lbs)
- WBA-NABA super-flyweight champion (115 lbs)
- WBC Internatiotal super-flyweight champion (115 lbs)

== See also ==
- List of super flyweight boxing champions
- List of bantamweight boxing champions
- List of WBA world champions
- List of WBC world champions
- List of Filipino boxing world champions

Sporting positions
Regional boxing titles
New title	IBF Inter-Continental junior-flyweight champion January 18, 1990 – June 1990; Vacated	Vacant Title next held by Yani Malhendo
Vacant Title last held by Alberto Ontiveros	WBA–NABA super-flyweight champion June 5, 1999 – August 1999; Vacated	Vacant Title next held by Alberto Ontiveros
Vacant Title last held by Damaen Kelly	WBC International super-flyweight champion May 27, 2000 – December 20, 2002; Lost bid for world title	Vacant Title next held by Malcolm Tuñacao
Preceded by Oscar Andrade	NABF super-flyweight champion May 24, 2002 – December 2002; Vacated	Vacant Title next held by Neddy Garcia
Minor world boxing titles
New title	WBF (Foundation) super-flyweight champion May 27, 2000 – December 2005; Vacated	Vacant Title next held by Simphiwe Nongqayi
Major world boxing titles
Preceded by Hiroshi Kawashima	WBC super-flyweight champion February 20, 1997 – August 29, 1998	Succeeded by Cho In-joo
Preceded by Jhonny González	WBO bantamweight champion August 11, 2007 – April 25, 2009; Stripped	Vacant Title next held by Fernando Montiel
