= Erik Morales vs. Zahir Raheem =

Boxing match

Double Trouble
- Date: September 10, 2005
- Venue: Staples Center, Los Angeles, California, U.S.
- Title(s) on the line: vacant WBC International lightweight title

Tale of the tape
| Boxer | Erik Morales | Zahir Raheem |
| Nickname | "El Terrible" ("The Terrible") | "King Raheem" |
| Hometown | Tijuana, Baja California, Mexico | Philadelphia, Pennsylvania, U.S. |
| Pre-fight record | 48–2 (34 KO) | 26–1 (16 KO) |
| Age | 29 years | 28 years, 10 months |
| Height | 5 ft 8 in (173 cm) | 5 ft 6 in (168 cm) |
| Weight | 134 1/2 lb (61 kg) | 133 lb (60 kg) |
| Style | Orthodox | Orthodox |
| Recognition | WBC/WBA; No. 1 Ranked Super Featherweight; The Ring; No. 2 Ranked Super Featherweight; The Ring No. 4 ranked pound-for-pound fighter 3-division world champion | WBC; No. 6 Ranked Super Featherweight; WBA; No. 10 Ranked Super Featherweight |

Result
- Raheem defeats Morales by unanimous decision

Erik Morales vs. Zahir Raheem, billed as Double Trouble, was a professional boxing match contested on September 10, 2005.

== Background ==
After their exciting bout in March 2005, Erik Morales and Manny Pacquiao were co-featured on a card at the Staples Center, Los Angeles, California, in what was regarded as tune-up bouts before an inevitable rematch. Pacquiao was to face Héctor Velázquez at super featherweight while Erik Morales would make his debut at lightweight against Zahir Raheem.

== The fights ==
=== Pacquiao vs. Velázquez ===
Double Trouble: Manny Pacquiao vs. Héctor Velázquez
- Title(s) on the line: vacant WBC International super featherweight title

Tale of the tape
| Boxer | Manny Pacquiao | Héctor Velázquez |
| Nickname | "Pac-Man" | "Charro Negro" ("Black Charro") |
| Hometown | General Santos, Soccsksargen, Philippines | Tijuana, Baja California, Mexico |
| Purse | $750,000 | |
| Pre-fight record | 39–3–2 (32 KO) | 48–3 (34 KO) |
| Age | 26 years, 8 months | 30 years, 6 months |
| Height | 5 ft 6 1/2 in (169 cm) | 5 ft 7 in (170 cm) |
| Weight | 130 lb (59 kg) | 130 lb (59 kg) |
| Style | Southpaw | Orthodox |
| Recognition | WBC/The Ring; No. 3 Ranked Super Featherweight; IBF; No. 4 Ranked Super Featherweight; The Ring No. 5 ranked pound-for-pound fighter 3-division world champion | WBC; No. 12 Ranked Featherweight |

Result
- Pacquiao wins via 6th-round TKO

Velázquez gave Pacquiao a hard time in the first two rounds of their bout before getting caught by Pacquiao's superior speed and power getting stopped in the sixth round.

=== Aftermath ===
Velázquez later on fought Pacquiao's brother, Bobby, and won via disqualification.

| Preceded by vs. Erik Morales | Manny Pacquiao's bouts 10 September 2005 | Succeeded by vs. Erik Morales II |
| Preceded by vs. Trinidad Mendoza | Héctor Velázquez's bouts 10 September 2005 | Succeeded by vs. Adan Amador |

=== Morales vs. Raheem ===
In the main event, former 3-division champion Erik Morales faced 1996 Olympian Zahir Raheem

Morales was a heavy favourite and the matchup was viewed as warmup for his already scheduled rematch against Manny Pacquiao. However, Raheem would frustrate Morales with constant lateral movement. Raheem rocked Morales in the 5th round and built a lead on the scorecards, but Morales rallied in the 11th round and staggered him with a right hand as Raheem's glove touched the canvas, but it was not scored a knockdown by referee Jon Schorle.

The final scores were 118–110, 116–112 and 115–112 in favor of Raheem giving him a unanimous decision victory.

HBO's unofficial scorer, Harold Lederman, scored the bout 118–110 for Raheem, the same score as his daughter Julie Lederman one of the three official judges.

According to CompuBox Raheem landed 111 out of 282 punches (39%) against Morales landing only 62 out of 353 (18%).

== Aftermath ==
Speaking after the bout Raheem said "I beat a legend tonight, I made all the sacrifices coming into this fight, I believed in myself and I fought a smart fight. All I needed was a chance to prove myself. None of the elite fighters ever gave me a shot, before Morales stepped up. Now the sky's the limit."

When asked if fighting at lightweight was perhaps too heavy for him, Morales replied: "I did feel a little out of whack but I have to look at the tape before I decide to go back down [to 130 pounds]."

== Undercard ==
Confirmed bouts:

== Broadcasting ==
| Country | Broadcaster |
|---|---|
| United States | HBO |

| Preceded by vs. Manny Pacquiao | Erik Morales's bouts 10 September 2005 | Succeeded by vs. Manny Pacquiao II |
| Preceded by vs. Jose Quintana | Zahir Raheem's bouts 10 September 2005 | Succeeded by vs. Acelino Freitas |
Awards
| Preceded by Glen Johnson vs. Roy Jones Jr. | The Ring Upset of the Year; 2005 | Succeeded by Zab Judah vs. Carlos Baldomir |
