= Cristian Mijares =

Mexican boxer (born 1981)

Personal information
- Nickname: El Diamante ("The Diamond")
- Born: Cristian Ricardo Lucio Mijares; 2 October 1981 (age 45) Gomez Palacio, Durango, Mexico
- Height: 5 ft 6 in (168 cm)
- Weight: Super flyweight; Bantamweight; Super bantamweight; Featherweight

Boxing career
- Reach: 68 in (173 cm)
- Stance: Southpaw

Boxing record
- Total fights: 70
- Wins: 59
- Win by KO: 27
- Losses: 9
- Draws: 2

Cristian Ricardo Lucio Mijares (born 2 October 1981) is a Mexican former professional boxer. He is a two-time super flyweight champion, having held the unified WBC and WBA (Unified) titles from 2006 to 2008 and the IBF title from 2010 to 2011.

== Early life ==
Mijares comes from a large boxing family. His younger brother is a lightweight prospect Ricardo Mijares and his uncle is a former world title contender Vicente Mijares.

== Professional career ==
On 3 June 2006, Mijares knocked out Adalberto Davila in six rounds for the Mexican super flyweight title.

=== WBC super flyweight championship ===
On 18 September 2006, he defeated former champion Katsushige Kawashima for the interim WBC title, by a split decision. The official scorers saw it 114–113, 113–114, 114–113. He was later promoted to full champion after reigning champion Masamori Tokuyama vacated his title on 6 December 2006, in anticipation of retiring. In 2007, he defeated Katsushige Kawashima in a rematch via a tenth round knock out.

On 14 April 2007, Mijares defended his title by beating two time light flyweight champion Jorge Arce by unanimous decision in a particularly bloody match for Arce, who saw his first defeat since 1999. Mijares won the fight by a wide margin, with the official judges scoring the match 119–109, 118–110, 117–111, all in favor of Mijares.

Mijares returned just 3 months later, beating Teppei Kikui, dominating and then stopping him in 10 rounds in front of his hometown crown in Mexico. Mijares made quick work of obscure journeyman Franck Gorjux stopping him in just 1 round.

In February 2008, Mijares returned to the United States and was featured on a HBO pay-per-view under card against flyweight Olympian Jose Navarro, the early rounds belonged to Mijares, while the middle rounds were evenly matched with Mijares finishing strong in the later rounds. Mijares retained his title with a Split Decision victory.

=== WBA super flyweight championship ===
Mijares unified his WBC super flyweight title by defeating WBA Champion Alexander Muñoz via split decision on 17 May 2008. After several close opening rounds, Mijares took control with his crisp counterpunching and brilliant defense, with the win being secured by many dominant late rounds in which he managed to hurt Munoz. This win made him the WBA (Unified) champion. With the victory, Mijares earned a spot in the top 10 pound for pound list.

Mijares made a return on 30 August in Mexico, where he defended his two crowns against a 38-year-old former WBC flyweight champion, Chatchai Sasakul. Sasakul had lost his title to Manny Pacquiao in 1998 and had not fought any world class opposition since. Mijares easily controlled the contest with his jab and counterpunching, eventually stopping Sasakul in round 3 after dropping him in the previous round.

Mijares was most recently knocked out by Vic Darchinyan in the 9th round, losing his WBC and WBA super flyweight titles to the Armenian-born Australian in a surprising upset. Although he had three defeats prior to his bout with Darchinyan, this was the first time Mijares had been stopped.

He went up in weight and challenged Nehomar Cermeño for the interim WBA bantamweight title on 14 March 2009. Mijares lost by split decision. He fought Cermeño again on 12 September 2009 for that same title but lost by unanimous decision. Two days later, Mijares announced his retirement from boxing.

=== IBF super flyweight championship ===
On 11 December 2010, Mijares became a two-time super flyweight champion by beating IBF super flyweight champion Juan Alberto Rosas.

In May 2011, Cristian made his first defence, a victory over contender Carlos Rueda.

== Retirement ==
On 16 June 2018, Mijares headlined his retirement card before a partisan crowd at Gómez Palacio, losing by third-round knockout to Wilfredo Vázquez Jr. of Puerto Rico.

== Professional boxing record ==
70 fights	59 wins	9 losses
By knockout	27	2
By decision	31	7
By disqualification	1	0
Draws	2	

No.	Result	Record	Opponent	Type	Round, time	Date	Location	Notes
70	Loss	59-9-2	Wilfredo Vazquez Jr.	TKO	3 (10)	16 Jun 2018	Auditorio Centenario, Gomez Palacio, Mexico	
69	Win	59-8-2	David Saucedo	TKO	8 (10)	17 Mar 2018	Oasis Hotel Complex, Cancun, Mexico	
68	Win	58-8-2	Jesus Arevalo	UD	10	7 Oct 2017	Campeche, Mexico	
67	Win	57-8-2	Rafael Hernandez	UD	10	29 Jul 2017	Durango, Mexico	
66	Win	56-8-2	Tomas Rojas	UD	10	8 Apr 2017	Cancun, Mexico	
65	Win	55-8-2	Shohei Kawashima	UD	12	29 Oct 2016	Durango, Mexico	Retained WBC Silver featherweight title
64	Win	54-8-2	Andres Gutierrez	MD	12	4 Jun 2016	Cancun, Mexico	Won vacant WBC Silver featherweight title
63	Win	53-8-2	Cristian Arrazola	KO	7 (10)	19 Dec 2015	Tlalnepantla, Mexico	
62	Win	52-8-2	Vergel Nebran	UD	10	19 Jun 2015	Ciudad Del Carmen Campeche, Mexico	
61	Win	51-8-2	Lester Medrano	UD	10	15 Nov 2014	Cancun, Quintana Roo, Mexico	
60	Win	50-8-2	Sebastian Daniel Rodriguez	KO	7 (10)	21 Jun 2014	Cancun, Quintana Roo, Mexico	
59	Loss	49-8-2	Leo Santa Cruz	UD	12	8 Mar 2014	MGM Grand Garden Arena, Las Vegas, Nevada, United States	For WBC super bantamweight title
58	Win	49-7-2	Jovanny Soto	KO	3 (10)	14 Dec 2013	Mexico City, Distrito Federal, Mexico	
57	Win	48-7-2	Carlos Jacobo	TKO	6 (10)	27 Jul 2013	Comitán, Chiapas, Mexico	
56	Loss	47-7-2	Victor Terrazas	SD	12	20 Apr 2013	Mexico City Arena, Mexico City, Mexico	For vacant WBC super bantamweight title
55	Win	47-6-2	Rafael Marquez	TKO	9 (12)	28 Oct 2012	Mexico City Arena, Mexico City, Mexico	Won vacant WBC–USNBC featherweight title
54	Win	46-6-2	Eusebio Osejo	UD	10	30 Jun 2012	Aguascalientes, Aguascalientes, Mexico	
53	Win	45-6-2	Eddy Julio	KO	4 (10)	21 Apr 2012	Morelia, Michoacan, Mexico	Won vacant WBC Silver super bantamweight title
52	Win	44-6-2	Alejandro Valdez	TKO	3 (10)	17 Dec 2011	Ciudad Obregón, Sonora, Mexico	
51	Win	43-6-2	Jonathan Perez	TKO	3 (10)	10 Sep 2011	Zacatecas, Zacatecas, Mexico	
50	Win	42-6-2	Carlos Rueda	UD	12	14 May 2011	Victoria de Durango, Durango, Mexico	Retained IBF super flyweight title
49	Win	41-6-2	Juan Alberto Rosas	UD	12	11 Dec 2010	Torreon, Coahuila, Mexico	Won IBF super flyweight title
48	Win	40-6-2	Franklin Solis	TKO	4 (10)	14 Aug 2010	Aguascalientes, Aguascalientes, Mexico	
47	Win	39-6-2	Francisco Arce	SD	12	10 Apr 2010	Victoria de Durango, Durango, Mexico	Won vacant NABF bantamweight title
46	Win	38-6-2	BJ Dolorosa	TKO	6 (10)	12 Dec 2009	Mazatlan, Sinaloa, Mexico	
45	Win	37-6-2	Jesus Vidal	KO	3 (10)	20 Nov 2009	Cancun, Quintana Roo, Mexico	
44	Loss	36-6-2	Nehomar Cermeno	UD	12	12 Sep 2009	Monterrey, Nuevo Leon, Mexico	For WBA interim bantamweight title
43	Loss	36-5-2	Nehomar Cermeno	SD	12	14 Mar 2009	Torreon, Coahuila, Mexico	For vacant WBA interim bantamweight title
42	Loss	36-4-2	Vic Darchinyan	KO	9 (12)	1 Nov 2008	Home Depot Center, Carson, California, U.S.	Lost WBA (Unified) and WBC super flyweight titles; For IBF super flyweight title
41	Win	36-3-2	Chatchai Sasakul	TKO	3 (12)	30 Aug 2008	Monterrey, Nuevo Leon, Mexico	Retained WBA (Unified) and WBC super flyweight titles
40	Win	35-3-2	Alexander Muñoz	SD	12	17 May 2008	Gomez Palacio, Durango, Mexico	Retained WBC super flyweight title; Won WBA (Unified) super flyweight title
39	Win	34-3-2	Jose Navarro	SD	12	16 Feb 2008	MGM Grand Garden, Las Vegas, Nevada, U.S.	Retained WBC super flyweight title
38	Win	33-3-2	Franck Gorjux	TKO	1 (12)	20 Oct 2007	Cancun, Quintana Roo, Mexico	Retained WBC super flyweight title
37	Win	32-3-2	Teppei Kikui	TKO	10 (12)	13 Jul 2007	Gomez Palacio, Durango, Mexico	Retained WBC super flyweight title
36	Win	31-3-2	Jorge Arce	UD	12	14 Apr 2007	Alamodome, San Antonio, Texas, U.S.	Retained WBC super flyweight title
35	Win	30-3-2	Katsushige Kawashima	TKO	10 (12)	3 Jan 2007	Ariake Colosseum, Tokyo, Japan	Retained WBC super flyweight title
34	Win	29-3-2	Reynaldo Lopez	UD	12	17 Nov 2006	Torreon, Coahuila, Mexico	Retained WBC interim super flyweight title
33	Win	28-3-2	Katsushige Kawashima	SD	12	18 Sep 2006	Yokohama, Kanagawa, Japan	Won WBC interim super flyweight title
32	Win	27-3-2	Adalberto Davila	KO	6 (12)	3 Jun 2006	Gomez Palacio, Durango, Mexico	Retained Mexico super flyweight title
31	Draw	26-3-2	Luis Maldonado	MD	12	24 Feb 2006	Torreon, Coahuila, Mexico	
30	Win	26-3-1	Saul Gutierrez	UD	10	10 Dec 2005	Torreon, Coahuila, Mexico	
29	Win	25-3-1	Alimi Goitia	TKO	3 (12)	16 Sep 2005	Torreon, Coahuila, Mexico	Won vacant WBA Fedalatin super flyweight title
28	Win	24-3-1	Gerson Guerrero	TKO	8 (12)	3 Jun 2005	Torreon, Coahuila, Mexico	Retained Mexico super flyweight title
27	Win	23-3-1	Hugo Vargas	UD	10	1 Apr 2005	Gomez Palacio, Durango, Mexico	
26	Win	22-3-1	Moises Zamudio	SD	10	10 Dec 2004	Gomez Palacio, Durango, Mexico	
25	Win	21-3-1	Javier Torres	KO	1 (12)	17 Sep 2004	Torreon, Coahuila, Mexico	Retained Mexico super flyweight title
24	Win	20-3-1	Ulises Cadena	TKO	7 (12)	29 May 2004	Los Cabos, Baja California Sur, Mexico	Retained Mexico super flyweight title
23	Win	19-3-1	Tomas Rojas	UD	12	12 Mar 2004	Gomez Palacio, Durango, Mexico	Won Mexico super flyweight title
22	Win	18-3-1	Saul Briseno	TKO	9 (10)	20 Nov 2003	Gomez Palacio, Durango, Mexico	
21	Win	17-3-1	Arturo Bracamontes	SD	10	1 Aug 2003	Gomez Palacio, Durango, Mexico	
20	Win	16-3-1	Juan Garcia	TKO	6 (10)	27 Jun 2003	Gomez Palacio, Durango, Mexico	
19	Win	15-3-1	Guadalupe Arce	KO	2 (8)	16 May 2003	Torreon, Coahuila, Mexico	
18	Win	14-3-1	Juan Garcia	UD	10	21 Mar 2003	Torreon, Coahuila, Mexico	
17	Win	13-3-1	Jose Alfredo Tirado	UD	10	1 Jan 2003	Gomez Palacio, Durango, Mexico	
16	Win	12-3-1	Antonio Martinez	DQ	5 (8)	4 Oct 2002	Gomez Palacio, Durango, Mexico	
15	Loss	11-3-1	Jose Alfredo Tirado	UD	10	19 Jul 2002	Culiacan, Sinaloa, Mexico	
14	Win	11-2-1	Jose de Jesus Robles	KO	6 (6)	1 Jan 2002	Mexicali, Baja California, Mexico	
13	Loss	10-2-1	Ricardo Espinoza	UD	4	19 Jun 2001	Mexico City, Mexico	
12	Draw	10-1-1	Ricardo Espinoza	SD	4	5 Jun 2001	Mexico City, Mexico	
11	Win	10-1	Cesar Augusto Martinez	UD	4	24 Apr 2000	Mexico City, Mexico	
10	Win	9-1	Manuel Ibarra	TD	6 (8)	20 Aug 1999	Veracruz, Veracruz, Mexico	
9	Win	8-1	Alejandro Sosa	UD	8	19 Mar 1999	Veracruz, Veracruz, Mexico	
8	Win	7-1	Lorenzo Lopez	TKO	2 (6)	5 Feb 1999	Torreon, Coahuila, Mexico	
7	Win	6-1	Jesus Lopez	UD	6	23 Oct 1998	Guasave, Sonora, Mexico	
6	Win	5-1	Jesus Lopez	UD	6	7 Aug 1998	Veracruz, Veracruz, Mexico	
5	Loss	4-1	Alejandro Sosa	MD	4	29 May 1998	Veracruz, Veracruz, Mexico	
4	Win	4-0	Eduardo Camacho	UD	4	20 Apr 1998	Auditorio Municipal, Tijuana, Baja California, Mexico	
3	Win	3-0	Juan Lopez	UD	4	13 Mar 1998	Mexico City, Mexico	
2	Win	2-0	Jose Sifuentes	TKO	3 (4)	21 Oct 1997	Mexico City, Mexico	
1	Win	1-0	Pedro Hernandez	UD	4	20 Aug 1997	Nezahualcoyotl, Mexico	

== Titles in boxing ==
Major world titles

- WBC super flyweight champion (115 lbs)
- WBA (Unified) super flyweight champion (115 lbs)
- IBF super flyweight Champion (115 lbs)

Interim titles

- WBC interim super flyweight champion (115 lbs)

Regional/International titles

- Mexico super flyweight champion (115 lbs)
- WBA Fedelatin super flyweight champion (115 lbs)
- NABF bantamweight champion (118 lbs)
- WBC Silver featherweight champion (126 lbs)

== See also ==
- List of Mexican boxing world champions
- Notable boxing families
- List of WBC world champions
- List of WBA world champions
- List of IBF world champions
- List of super flyweight boxing champions

Sporting positions
World boxing titles
New title	WBC super flyweight Interim title 3 June 2006 – 6 December 2006; Promoted	Vacant Title next held by Tomás Rojas
Vacant Title last held by Masamori Tokuyama	WBC super flyweight champion 6 December 2006 – 1 November 2008	Succeeded by Vic Darchinyan
New title Unified titles against Alexander Muñoz	WBA super flyweight champion Unified title 17 May 2008 – 1 November 2008	Succeeded by Vic Darchinyan
Preceded by Juan Alberto Rosas	IBF super flyweight champion 11 December 2010 – 17 August 2011; Vacated	Vacant Title next held by Rodrigo Guerrero
