= Chatchai Sasakul =

Thai boxer (born 1970)

- Born: February 5, 1970 (age 56); Nakhon Ratchasima, Thailand
- Native name: ฉัตรชัย สาสะกุล
- Other names: Nuengthoranee Petchyindee; Nuengthoranee Lukbangli; Chatchai Elite Gym (ฉัตรชัย อีลิทยิม); Chatchai Kratingdaenggym (ฉัตรชัย กระทิงแดงยิม); Chatchai 3-K Battery (ฉัตรชัย สามเคแบตเตอรี่); Chatchai Dutch Boy Gym (ฉัตรชัย ดัทช์บอยยิม); Chatchai Singwangcha (ฉัตรชัย สิงห์วังชา)
- Nickname: Nueng ("One")
- Height: 5 ft 2 1/2 in (159 cm)
- Division: Flyweight; Super Flyweight; Bantamweight
- Reach: 63 in (160 cm)
- Style: Orthodox

Professional boxing record
- Total: 68
- Wins: 63
- By knockout: 38
- Losses: 4
- By knockout: 2
- Draws: 1

Other information
- Boxing record from BoxRec

Chatchai Sasakul (Thai: ฉัตรชัย สาสะกุล; born February 5, 1970) is a Thai former professional Muay Thai fighter and boxer. He competed in the 1988 Seoul Olympic Games before going on to hold the WBC Flyweight title from May 1997 to December 1998. Aside from being a professional boxer, he is also a practitioner in snooker.

== Early life ==
He was born in Nakhon Ratchasima Province, but his family moved to Khlong Toei District in Bangkok when he was young, settling in Zone 9 of the Khlong Toei slum. Growing up in poverty, he was forced by his father to take up boxing as a child, starting with Muay Thai.

== Muay Thai and amateur boxing career ==
Sasakul's martial arts journey began with Muay Thai. He initially fought in the Bangkok circuit under the name Nuengthoranee Lukbangli (หนึ่งธรณี ลูกบางลี่), before changing to Nuengthoranee Petchyindee (หนึ่งธรณี เพชรยินดี) after joining the Petchyindee Boxing Promotions stable. Under the patronage of Virat Vachirarattanawong, the owner of Petchyindee, he attended high school at Bhadungsit Pittaya School in Bang Sue; the school is known for its strong amateur boxing program at the youth level. He later transitioned to Western boxing and rose to become one of Thailand's top amateur boxing stars. He had an amateur record of 85 fights, winning 78 of them, he won the 1989 and 1990 editions of the King's Cup where he received the Best Boxer of the competition award.

During his time as an amateur boxer, he was regarded as the favorite of Klaew Thanikhul, a well-known mafia figure who was highly influential in the Thai boxing industry at the time. Thanikhul took him to nightclubs and massage parlours around Bangkok at night, and even brought him to a casino in Las Vegas, even though he was only in the eleventh grade.

=== Olympic career ===
He represented Thailand as a Light Flyweight at the 1988 Seoul Olympic Games. The results of his fights were:

- 1st round bye
- Defeated Luis Rolon (Puerto Rico) 3–2
- Defeated Maurice Maina (Kenya) 5–0
- Lost to Róbert Isaszegi (Hungary) 2–3

== Professional boxing career ==
Sasakul turned pro in 1991 and captured the WBC and lineal flyweight titles with a win over Yuri Arbachakov in 1997, having previously challenged him in 1995 in his first career loss. He defended the titles twice before losing to Manny Pacquiao by knockout in 1998 to earn Pacquiao his first championship title.

On March 31, 2007, Sasakul knocked out Lito Sisnorio, a Filipino boxer. Sisnorio reportedly sustained brain injuries during the fight. The next day, following unsuccessful brain surgery, Sisnorio was pronounced dead at Piyamin Hospital in Thailand at 9:15 PM. The controversy over the match arose from the fact that Sisnorio's role in the fight was not officially sanctioned by the Philippine Games and Amusement Board. His death prompted the Board to ban all fights involving Filipino boxers in Thailand starting April 2007.

On August 30, 2008, Sasakul challenged Cristian Mijares, the WBA and WBC unified super flyweight champion. However, he stopped in three rounds. According to a doctor who provided him medication after the match, this was the Thai boxer's last career fight. What might have become a disadvantage for Sasakul was that he had to go to a second flight to Mexico through Germany after having problems with the first flight which tried to go through Hong Kong. By the time he got to Mexico, the fight was only three days away and that he experienced jet lag.

== After retirement ==
After retirement, he briefly opened a mu kratha night restaurant, but it was unsuccessful. Later, Sasakul opened his own boxing gym, Sasakul Muay Thai, in Bangkok, focusing primarily on boxing with the goal of nurturing a new generation of Thai world boxing champions. He is also a trainer to Superbon Banchamek and to fighters from his former team, Petchyindee Boxing Promotions, such as Pongsaklek Wonjongkam, Kompayak Porpramook, Panomroonglek Kratingdaenggym, Yodmongkol Vor Saengthep, Knockout CP Freshmart, Noknoi Sitthiprasert.

== Professional boxing record ==
68 fights	63 wins	4 losses
By knockout	38	2
By decision	25	2
Draws	1	

No.	Result	Record	Opponent	Type	Round	Date	Location	Notes
68	Win	63–4–1	Chaiwirat Rongthaisong	KO	5 (6)	Nov 25, 2008	Lumpinee Boxing Stadium, Bangkok, Thailand	
67	Loss	62–4–1	Cristian Mijares	TKO	3 (12)	Aug 30, 2008	Arena Monterrey, Monterrey, Nuevo León, Mexico	For WBA (Super) and WBC super-flyweight titles
66	Win	62–3–1	Anis Ceunfin	TKO	2 (10)	Dec 4, 2007	Bungboraphet, Nakhon Sawan, Thailand	
65	Win	61–3–1	Marvin Tampus	UD	8	Oct 24, 2007	Bang Phli, Thailand	
64	Win	60–3–1	Jonrae Verano	UD	6	Aug 24, 2007	Ubon Ratchathani, Thailand	
63	Win	59–3–1	Roger Monserto	UD	8	Jul 18, 2007	Bangkok, Thailand	
62	Win	58–3–1	Masanori Murata	UD	6	May 25, 2007	Por Kungpao, Udomsuk, Bangkok, Thailand	
61	Win	57–3–1	Lito Sisnorio	KO	4 (8)	Mar 30, 2007	Mathayom Wat Sing Schoo, Samut Prakan, Thailand	Sisnorio died from injuries sustained in this fight, he had no license or approval to box
60	Win	56–3–1	Alfred Nagal	UD	6	Jan 26, 2007	City Hall, Tak, Thailand	
59	Win	55–3–1	Roger Berloza	TKO	4 (6)	Dec 29, 2006	Samut Songkhram, Thailand	
58	Win	54–3–1	Yuki Murai	UD	12	Sep 7, 2006	Samut Songkhram, Thailand	Retained interim WBC Asian super-flyweight title
57	Win	53–3–1	Katsumi Makiyama	TKO	5 (12)	Jul 28, 2006	City Hall, Sara Buri, Thailand	Won vacant interim WBC Asian super-flyweight title
56	Win	52–3–1	Dodong Discado	KO	2 (10)	Apr 28, 2006	Taikek Market, Sara Buri, Thailand	
55	Loss	51–3–1	Kuniyuki Aizawa	UD	10	Dec 12, 2005	Korakuen Hall, Tokyo, Japan	
54	Win	51–2–1	Nathan Barcelona	UD	8	Oct 28, 2005	Chokchai 4 Center, Bangkok, Thailand	
53	Win	50–2–1	Tata Polinar	KO	6 (12)	Sep 30, 2005	Bangkok, Thailand	Retained interim WBC Asian bantamweight title
52	Win	49–2–1	Anucha Rassameeyan	UD	6	Jun 24, 2005	Por Kungpao, Pinklao Branch, Bangkok, Thailand	
51	Win	48–2–1	Al Tarazona	KO	2 (10)	Jan 29, 2005	Channel 7 Studios, Bangkok, Thailand	
50	Win	47–2–1	Thuwachit Boongome	TKO	2 (6)	Dec 31, 2004	Por Kungpao Restaurant, Bangkok, Thailand	
49	Win	46–2–1	Rolly Mandahinog	UD	10	Aug 27, 2004	Khukhan, Thailand	
48	Win	45–2–1	Jun Magsipoc	TKO	8 (12)	Jun 25, 2004	Wapeepatum, Maha Sarakham, Thailand	Retained interim WBC Asian bantamweight title
47	Win	44–2–1	Allan Fuentes	UD	12	Apr 30, 2004	Nakhon Ratchasima, Thailand	Retained interim WBC Asian bantamweight title
46	Win	43–2–1	Sunao Uno	SD	10	Mar 7, 2004	Industrial Hall, Gifu, Gifu, Japan	
45	Win	42–2–1	Anthony Villamor	TKO	4 (6)	Jan 3, 2004	Channel 7 Studios, Bangkok, Thailand	
44	Win	41–2–1	Rey Llagas	UD	12	Sep 5, 2003	Pradit Manootham Sports Arena, Klongtan, Thailand	Won vacant interim WBC Asian bantamweight title
43	Win	40–2–1	Edgar Tahad	KO	2 (?)	Jul 25, 2003	City Hall, Chaiyaphum, Thailand	
42	Win	39–2–1	Arman Pedemonte	UD	10	Sep 22, 2000	Sara Buri, Thailand	
41	Win	38–2–1	Ricky Protacio	KO	5 (?)	Jun 23, 2000	Bangkok, Thailand	
40	Win	37–2–1	Nathan Barcelona	TKO	8 (10)	May 19, 2000	Srimnang Outdoor Arena, Udon Thani, Thailand	
39	Win	36–2–1	Marlon Terado	KO	4 (?)	Oct 17, 1999	Bangkok, Thailand	
38	Win	35–2–1	Rey Llagas	PTS	8	Sep 17, 1999	Pakpanag Metropolitan Stadium, Nakhon Si Thammarat, Thailand	
37	Win	34–2–1	Nathan Barcelona	UD	10	Aug 29, 1999	Bangkok, Thailand	
36	Win	33–2–1	Rico Macaubos	PTS	8	Mar 6, 1999	Buddamonton, Thailand	
35	Loss	32–2–1	Manny Pacquiao	KO	8 (12)	Dec 4, 1998	Tonsuk College Ground, Bangkok, Thailand	Lost WBC flyweight title
34	Win	32–1–1	Young Soon Jang	KO	5 (12)	May 1, 1998	Kanchanaburi Stadium, Kanchanaburi, Thailand	Retained WBC flyweight title
33	Win	31–1–1	Young Jin Kim	UD	12	Feb 27, 1998	Specially Built Arena, Ko Samui, Thailand	Retained WBC flyweight title
32	Win	30–1–1	Yuri Arbachakov	UD	12	Nov 12, 1997	Tsukisamu Green Dome, Sapporo, Hokkaido, Japan	Won WBC flyweight title
31	Win	29–1–1	Juan Domingo Córdoba	RTD	7 (12)	Aug 1, 1997	Prince Palace Hotel, Bangkok, Thailand	Retained WBC interim flyweight title
30	Win	28–1–1	Ysaias Zamudio	UD	12	May 9, 1997	Prince Palace Hotel, Bangkok, Thailand	Won vacant WBC interim flyweight title
29	Win	27–1–1	Ramil Gevero	KO	5 (10)	Jan 30, 1997	Provincial Stadium, Chumphon, Thailand	
28	Draw	26–1–1	Allan Morre	TD	2 (10)	Nov 8, 1996	Villa Café, Phraram 9, Bangkok, Thailand	
27	Win	26–1	Ricky Ocoy	TKO	6 (8)	Aug 23, 1996	Provincial Stadium, Surat Thani, Thailand	
26	Win	25–1	Jimmy Aguirre	TKO	4 (10)	Jul 31, 1996	The Grand, Bangkae, Bangkok, Thailand	
25	Win	24–1	Texas Gomez	TKO	4 (6)	May 24, 1996	Vichean Buri, Petchaboon, Thailand	
24	Win	23–1	Pablo Tiznado	TKO	9 (10)	Apr 15, 1996	Great Western Forum, Inglewood, California, U.S.	
23	Win	22–1	Joel Nice	KO	3 (?)	Jan 27, 1996	Bansaen Stadium, Chonburi, Thailand	
22	Win	21–1	Ledion Ceniza	PTS	8	Nov 5, 1995	Sara Buri, Thailand	
21	Loss	20–1	Yuri Arbachakov	UD	12	Sep 25, 1995	Nippon Budokan, Tokyo, Japan	For WBC flyweight title
20	Win	20–0	Joseph Paden	KO	3 (?)	Apr 27, 1995	Bangkok, Thailand	
19	Win	19–0	Mauro Saucelo	KO	2 (?)	Feb 19, 1995	Thansettakit Building, Bangkok, Thailand	
18	Win	18–0	Edwin Projo	KO	5 (?)	Dec 21, 1994	Thansettakit Building, Bangkok, Thailand	
17	Win	17–0	Chang-Il Moon	KO	3 (?)	Oct 24, 1994	Elite Gym Spa Complex, Bangkok, Thailand	
16	Win	16–0	Nolito Cabato	PTS	10	Aug 1, 1994	Bangkok, Thailand	
15	Win	15–0	Jack Siahaya	TKO	5 (?)	May 2, 1994	Elite Gym Spa Complex, Bangkok, Thailand	
14	Win	14–0	Oscar Jimenez	KO	2 (10)	Mar 13, 1994	Elite Gym Spa Complex, Bangkok, Thailand	
13	Win	13–0	Benjie Duran	KO	3 (?)	Dec 18, 1993	Bangkok, Thailand	
12	Win	12–0	Rolando Protacio	TKO	3 (?)	Oct 30, 1993	Bangkok, Thailand	
11	Win	11–0	Reynante Jamili	KO	2 (?)	Jul 16, 1993	Bangkok, Thailand	
10	Win	10–0	Rolando Pascua	UD	12	Apr 28, 1993	Bangkok, Thailand	Retained WBC International flyweight title
9	Win	9–0	Alexander Makhmutov	UD	12	Feb 25, 1993	Bangkok, Thailand	Retained WBC International flyweight title
8	Win	8–0	Norikazu Kawana	TKO	3 (?)	Dec 25, 1992	Bangkok, Thailand	
7	Win	7–0	Jon Penalosa	KO	2 (?)	Oct 4, 1992	Bangkok, Thailand	
6	Win	6–0	Tarman Garzim	UD	10	Jul 5, 1992	Bangkok, Thailand	
5	Win	5–0	Jess Maca	PTS	10	May 29, 1992	Bangkok, Thailand	
4	Win	4–0	Ric Magramo	TKO	8 (12)	Mar 20, 1992	Bangkok, Thailand	Won vacant WBC International flyweight title
3	Win	3–0	Ric Siodora	TKO	2 (10)	Dec 27, 1991	Bangkok, Thailand	
2	Win	2–0	Ji-Chun Shim	TKO	5 (?)	Sep 17, 1991	Bangkok, Thailand	
1	Win	1–0	Bert Refugio	TKO	1 (?)	Aug 1, 1991	Bangkok, Thailand	

== Muay Thai record ==
Muay Thai Record (Incomplete)
Date	Result	Opponent	Event	Location	Method	Round	Time
1989-01-27	Win	(Thailand) Chakawan Naruemon	Lumpinee Stadium	Bangkok, Thailand	KO (Uppercut)	3	
1988-01-22	Draw	(Thailand) Noppadet Narumon	Lumpinee Stadium	Bangkok, Thailand	Decision	5	3:00
1987-02-13	Win	(Thailand) Fahsathan Lukprabat	Lumpinee Stadium	Bangkok, Thailand	Decision	5	3:00
1987-01-10	Win	(Thailand) Kangwannoi Or.Sribualoi	Lumpinee Stadium	Bangkok, Thailand	Referee stoppage	4	
1986-	Win	(Thailand) Karuhat Sor.Supawan	Lumpinee Stadium	Bangkok, Thailand	Decision	5	3:00
1985-	Loss	(Thailand) Kompayak Singmanee		Hat Yai, Thailand	Decision	5	3:00
1985-	Win	(Thailand) Kompayak Singmanee	Rajadamnern Stadium	Bangkok, Thailand	Decision	5	3:00
1985-	Loss	(Thailand) Karuhat Sor.Supawan		Samrong, Thailand	Decision	5	3:00
1983-	Loss	(Thailand) Hippy Singmanee		Bangkok, Thailand	Decision	5	3:00
1982-	Draw	(Thailand) Hippy Singmanee		Bangkok, Thailand	Decision	5	3:00
1982-	Loss	(Thailand) Wangyu Sor.Ploenjit	Rajadamnern Stadium	Bangkok, Thailand	TKO (Eye injury)	5	
	Win	(Thailand) Wangyu Sor.Ploenjit		Thailand	Decision	5	3:00
Legend: Win Loss Draw/No contest Notes

== See also ==
- List of world flyweight boxing champions

Sporting positions
World boxing titles
New title	WBC flyweight champion Interim title May 9, 1997 – November 12, 1997; Won full title	Vacant Title next held by Jorge Arce
Preceded by Yuri Arbachakov	WBC flyweight champion November 12, 1997 – December 4, 1998	Succeeded by Manny Pacquiao
