= Reynante Jamili =

Filipino boxer

Personal information
- Nickname: Pinoy Fist
- Nationality: Filipino
- Born: December 21, 1972 (age 53) Parañaque, Metro Manila, Philippines Silay City, Negros Occidental
- Height: 5 ft 7 in (1.70 m)
- Weight: Featherweight; Super Bantamweight

Boxing career
- Reach: 68 in (173 cm)
- Stance: Orthodox

Boxing record
- Total fights: 51
- Wins: 43
- Win by KO: 33
- Losses: 8
- Draws: 0
- No contests: 0

Reynante Jamili (born December 21, 1972) is a Filipino former professional boxer. He started his career in 1992 and retired in 2000. During his career, is the former Philippines GAB and OPBF Super Bantamweight Champion. After his retirement, he started working as a driver and caregiver in the US.

== Professional career ==
=== WBC Super Bantamweight Championship ===
In July 1999, Jamili was knocked out by WBC Super Bantamweight champion Érik Morales, in what would be his only shot at a World Championship.

After suffering a knockout loss to Juan Manuel Márquez, Jamili would go on to retire.

== Professional boxing record ==
51 fights	43 wins	8 losses
By knockout	33	5
By decision	10	3

No.	Result	Record	Opponent	Type	Round, Time	Date	Location	Notes
51	Loss	43–8	(Japan) Manabu Fukushima	KO	2 (?)	Dec 2, 2000	(Japan) Korakuen Hall, Tokyo, Tokyo Prefecture	
50	Loss	43–7	(Mexico) Juan Manuel Márquez	KO	3 (10) 1:14	Oct 22, 2000	(United States) Peppermill Hotel & Casino, Reno, Nevada	
49	Win	43–6	(Guam) Jung Kyng Soo	KO	3 (?)	Jun 4, 2000	(Guam) Agana	
48	Win	42–6	(Philippines) Henry Limpin	PTS	10	Mar 3, 2000	(Philippines) Batangas City, Batangas	
47	Loss	41–6	(Philippines) Manny Pacquiao	TKO	2 (12)	Dec 18, 1999	(Philippines) Elorde Sports Center, Parañaque City, Metro Manila	For WBC International super-bantamweight title
46	Win	41–5	(Indonesia) Frangky Mamuaya	KO	5 (?)	Nov 6, 1999	(Guam) Agana	
45	Win	40–5	(Philippines) Reynante Sasi	KO	2 (?)	Oct 10, 1999	(Philippines) Elorde Sports Center, Parañque City, Metro Manila	
44	Loss	39–5	(Mexico) Erik Morales	TKO	6 (12) 3:02	Jul 31, 1999	(Mexico) Plaza de Toros El Toreo, Tijuana, Baja California	For WBC super-bantamweight title
43	Win	39–4	(Indonesia) Kris Wuritimur	TKO	4 (10) 0:44	May 13, 1999	(United States) Sheraton Waikiki Hotel, Honolulu, Honolulu County, Hawaii	
42	Win	38–4	(Korea) Jae Hyun Kim	KO	5 (?)	Mar 6, 1999	(Guam) Agana	
41	Win	37–4	(Philippines) Lito Wayan	TKO	11 (12)	Feb 13, 1999	(Philippines) Elorde Sports Center, Oarañaque City, Metro Manila	Retained OPBF super-bantamweight title
40	Win	36–4	(Korea) Jin Hyung Yuh	KO	2 (10)	Dec 23, 1998	(Philippines) Elorde Sports Center, Parañaque City, Metro Manila	
39	Win	35–4	(Uganda) / (Japan) Isaac Sentuwa	KO	6 (12)	Oct 31, 1998	(Japan) Nagoya, Aichi Prefecture	Retained OPBF super-bantamweight title
38	Win	34–4	(Indonesia) Frangky Mamuaya	KO	4 (?)	Sep 12, 1998	(Philippines) KSC, Silay City, Negros Occidental	
37	Win	33–4	(Philippines) Jun Aguilan	KO	3 (?)	Jun 24, 1998	(Philippines) Elorde Sports Center, Parañaque City, Metro Manila	
36	Win	32–4	(Philippines) Lito Wayan	TKO	5 (10) 2:2	Apr 4, 1998	(Philippines) Elorde Sports Center, Parañaque City, Metro Manila	
35	Win	31–4	(Philippines) Edwin Gastador	UD	10	Feb 18, 1998	(Philippines) Elorde Sports Center, Parañaque City, Metro Manila	
34	Win	30–4	(Japan) Hidetoshi Tanaka	KO	2 (12) 2:36	Dec 7, 1997	(Japan) Tagawa, Fukuoka, Kyushu	Retained OPBF super-bantamweight title
33	Win	29–4	(Philippines) Cris Bado	TKO	3 (?)	Aug 27, 1997	(Philippines) Elorde Sports Center, Parañaque City, Metro Manila	
32	Win	28–4	(Thailand) Indhanon Jockygym	TKO	3 (?)	Apr 30, 1997	(Philippines) Parañaque City, Metro Manila	
31	Win	27–4	(Philippines) Ferdinand Caracena	KO	4 (?)	Jan 15, 1997	(Philippines) Elorde Sports Center, Parañaque City, Metro Manila	
30	Win	26–4	(Japan) Fusaaki Takenaga	TKO	8 (12) 1:07	Nov 11, 1996	(Japan) Tokyo, Tokyo Prefecture	Won vacant OPBF super-bantamweight title
29	Win	25–4	(Philippines) David Pantaras	TKO	2 (10)	Sep 25, 1996	(Philippines) Elorde Sports Center, Parañaque City, Metro Manila	
28	Win	24–4	(Philippines) Jonathan Albay	TKO	9 (?)	Jun 30, 1996	(Philippines) Elorde Sports Center, Parañaque City, Metro Manila	
27	Win	23–4	(Philippines) Lito Gonzaga	PTS	10	May 15, 1996	(Philippines) Elorde Sports Center, Parañaque City, Metro Manila	
26	Win	22–4	(Philippines) Ricky Ingalla	TKO	4 (?)	Apr 10 1996	(Philippines) Elorde Sports Center, Parañaque City, Metro Manila	
25	Win	21–4	(Korea) Suk Hwi Cho	TKO	4 (?)	Feb 24, 1996	(Philippines) Parañaque City, Metro Manila	
24	Win	20–4	(Korea) Young Kyun Lee	TKO	1 (?)	Dec 16, 1995	(Philippines) Bacolod City, Negros Occidental	
23	Win	19–4	(Korea) Jae Hyun Chun	KO	1 (?)	Oct 22 1995	(Korea) Seongju, Yeongnam	
22	Loss	18–4	(Philippines) Archie Anoos	TD	6 (?)	Jul 22, 1995	(Philippines) Manila, Metro Manila	
21	Win	18–3	(Philippines) Vic Galme	TD	8 (12) 1:49	May 27, 1995	(Philippines) Ninoy Aquino Stadium, District of Malate, Manila, Metro Manila	Retained Philippine Games and Amusements(GAB) Filipino super-bantamweight title;Bout stopped due to a Cut on Galme's right Eyebrow caused by an Accidental Headbutt
20	Win	17–3	(Philippines) Joe Escriber	UD	12	Mar 25, 1996	(Philippines) Iloilo City Sports Complex, Iloilo City, Iloilo	Won Philippine Games & Amusements Board(GAB) Filipino super-bantamweight title
19	Loss	16–3	(Philippines) Jess Maca	UD	10	Nov 26, 1994	(Philippines) Cebu Coliseum, Cebu City, Cebu	
18	Win	16–2	(Philippines) Ric Bajelot	TKO	8 (10)	Sep 17 1994	(Philippines) Elorde Sports Center, Parañaque City, Metro Manila	
17	Win	15–2	(Thailand) Anupong Srisuk	TKO	5 (10) 2:03	Jul 9, 1994	(Philippines) Elorde Sports Center, Parañaque City, Metro Manila	
16	Win	14–2	(Thailand) Torsak Pongsupa	KO	8 (10)	May 18, 1994	(Thailand) Channel 7 Studios, Bangkok, Bangkok Metropolitan Region	
15	Win	13–2	(Philippines) Primo Erasan	PTS	10	Apr 8, 1994	(Philippines) Araneta Center, Quezon City, Metro Manila	
14	Win	12–2	(Philippines) Roque Villanueva	KO	7 (?)	Feb 3, 1994	(Philippines) Manila, Metro Manila	
13	Win	11–2	(Philippines) Celso Gozo	TKO	9 (10)	Dec 23, 1993	(Philippines) Elorde Sports Center, Parañaque City, Metro Manila	
12	Loss	10–2	(Korea) In Joo Cho	PTS	10	Oct 23, 1993	(Korea) Seoul, Seoul Capital Area	
11	Loss	10–1	(Thailand) Chatchai Sasakul	KO	2 (?)	Jul 16, 1993	(Thailand) Bangkok, Bangkok Metropolitan Region	
10	Win	10–0	(Philippines) Gabriel Garcia	PTS	10	May 29, 1993	(Philippines) Lores Executive Village, Antipolo City, Rizal	
9	Win	9–0	(Philippines) Ricky Gayamo	TKO	6 (?)	Apr 28, 1993	(Philippines) Elorde Sports Center, Parañaque City, Metro Manila	
8	Win	8–0	(Philippines) Joe Juan	TKO	7 (?)	Feb 20, 1993	(Philippines) Rizal Memorial Coliseum, Manila, Metro Manila	
7	Win	7–0	(Philippines) Joel Buyagao	PTS	8	Dec 19, 1992	Philippines	
6	Win	6–0	(Philippines) Ramil Itom	PTS	8	Nov 28, 1992	(Philippines) Rizal Memorial Coliseum, Manila, Metro Manila	
5	Win	5–0	(Philippines) Noli Baluyot	TKO	2 (6)	Oct 28, 1992	(Philippines) Elorde Sports Center, Parañaque City, Metro Manila	
4	Win	4–0	(Philippines) John Lingayo	TKO	1 (?)	Sep 26, 1992	(Philippines) Iligan City, Lanao del Norte	
3	Win	3–0	(Philippines) Ric Brazas	UD	4	Jul 17, 1992	(Philippines) Rizal Memorial Sports Complex, Manila, Metro Manila	
2	Win	2–0	(Philippines) Dennis Batiller	TKO	3 (4) 1:20	Jun 10, 1992	(Philippines) Elorde Sports Center, Parañaque City, Metro Manila	
1	Win	1–0	(Philippines) Larry Maala	TKO	1 (4)	May 8, 1992	(Philippines) Rizal Memorial Sports Complex, Manila, Metro Manila	Professional Debut
