= Erik Morales vs. Manny Pacquiao =

Boxing competition

Coming With Everything
- Date: March 19, 2005
- Venue: MGM Grand Garden Arena, Paradise, Nevada, U.S.
- Title(s) on the line: vacant WBC International and IBA super featherweight titles

Tale of the tape
| Boxer | Erik Morales | Manny Pacquiao |
| Nickname | "El Terrible" ("The Terrible") | "Pac-Man" |
| Hometown | Tijuana, Baja California, Mexico | General Santos, Soccsksargen, Philippines |
| Purse | $2,500,000 | $1,750,000 |
| Pre-fight record | 47–2 (34 KO) | 39–2–2 (31 KO) |
| Age | 28 years, 6 months | 26 years, 3 months |
| Height | 5 ft 8 in (173 cm) | 5 ft 6 1/2 in (169 cm) |
| Weight | 130 lb (59 kg) | 129 1/2 lb (59 kg) |
| Style | Orthodox | Southpaw |
| Recognition | WBC; No. 1 Ranked Super Featherweight; The Ring; No. 2 Ranked Super Featherweight; The Ring No. 8 ranked pound-for-pound fighter 3-division world champion | The Ring; Featherweight Champion; WBA; No. 1 Ranked Featherweight; IBF; No. 2 Ranked Featherweight; The Ring No. 5 ranked pound-for-pound fighter 3-division world champion |

Result
- Morales wins via 12-round unanimous decision (115–113, 115–113, 115–113)

Erik Morales vs. Manny Pacquiao, billed as Coming With Everything, was a super featherweight boxing match. This match occurred on March 19, 2005, at the MGM Grand Garden Arena, Las Vegas, Nevada, United States and was distributed by HBO PPV. The bout is the first of the Pacquiao-Morales trilogy, widely considered one of the greatest boxing trilogies of all time.

== Background ==
Pacquiao was a 7-5 betting favourite.

== The fight ==
Morales controlled the pace of the close fight. In the fifth round, Pacquiao suffered a cut over his right eye caused by Morales' right cross. At the end of 12 round all three judges scored the bout 115–113 for Morales.

Both the Associated Press and Harold Lederman, HBO's unofficial scorer, had the fight 116-112 for Morales.

== Undercard ==
Confirmed bouts:

== Broadcasting ==
| Country | Broadcaster |
|---|---|
| Australia | Main Event |
| Canada | Viewers Choice |
| Hungary | Sport1 |
| Mexico | TV Azteca |
| Philippines | Solar Sports (cable); RPN 9 (free-to-air) |
| United Kingdom | Sky Sports |
| United States | HBO |

| Preceded by vs. Marco Antonio Barrera III | Erik Morales's bouts March 19, 2005 | Succeeded by vs. Zahir Raheem |
| Preceded by vs. Narongrit Pirang | Manny Pacquiao's bouts March 19, 2005 | Succeeded by vs. Héctor Velázquez |
