= Joel Luna Zárate =

Mexican boxer (born 1965)

Personal information
- Born: Joel Luna Zárate; 12 November 1965 (age 60) Mexico City, Mexico
- Height: 1.64 m (5 ft 5 in)
- Weight: Featherweight; Super Bantamweight; Bantamweight super flyweight

Boxing career
- Stance: Orthodox

Boxing record
- Total fights: 40
- Wins: 34
- Win by KO: 27
- Losses: 4
- Draws: 2
- No contests: 0

Joel Luna Zárate (born November 12, 1965) is a Mexican former professional boxer. He is the former WBO Latino super flyweight champion and also the nephew of former world boxing champion Carlos Zárate.

== Pro career ==
On April 25, 1998 Joel Luna fought Gerry Peñalosa for the WBC Super Flyweight title, but the bout ended in a technical draw.

== See also ==
- Notable boxing families
