= Erik Morales vs. Manny Pacquiao II =

Boxing match

The Battle
- Date: January 21, 2006
- Venue: Thomas & Mack Center, Paradise, Nevada, U.S.
- Title(s) on the line: WBC Super Featherweight Title Eliminator

Tale of the tape
Boxer	Erik Morales	Manny Pacquiao
Nickname	El Terrible ("The Terrible")	"Pac-Man"
Hometown	Tijuana, Baja California, Mexico	General Santos, Soccsksargen, Philippines
Purse		$2,000,000
Pre-fight record	48–3 (34 KO)	40–3–2 (31 KO)
Age	29 years, 4 months	27 years, 1 month
Height	5 ft 8 in (173 cm)	5 ft 6 1/2 in (169 cm)
Weight	130 lb (59 kg)	128 1/2 lb (58 kg)
Style	Orthodox	Southpaw
Recognition	WBC; No. 1 Ranked Super Featherweight; WBA; No. 7 Ranked Super Featherweight; The Ring; No. 2 Ranked Super Featherweight; The Ring No. 6 ranked pound-for-pound fighter 3-division world champion	WBA; No. 1 Ranked Super Featherweight; WBC; No. 2 Ranked Super Featherweight; IBF/The Ring; No. 3 Ranked Super Featherweight; WBC International super featherweight champion The Ring No. 5 ranked pound-for-pound fighter 3-division world champion

Result
- Pacquiao wins via 10th-round TKO

Erik Morales vs. Manny Pacquiao II, billed as The Battle, was a professional boxing match contested on January 21, 2006, for the WBC International super featherweight championship.

== Background ==
The bout took place at the Thomas & Mack Center, Las Vegas, Nevada, United States and was distributed by HBO PPV. The bout is the second of the Pacquiao-Morales trilogy, widely considered one of the greatest boxing trilogies of all time.

== The fight ==
Pacquiao dominated the fight, eventually scoring a technical knockout win against Morales in the tenth round and avenge the third loss of his career in their first fight. It was the first time Morales had ever been stopped.

== Undercard ==
Confirmed bouts:

== Broadcasting ==
Country	Broadcaster
United States	HBO
Philippines	Solar Sports ABS-CBN (Pay, live)

Preceded by vs. Zahir Raheem	Erik Morales's bouts 21 January 2006	Succeeded by vs. Manny Pacquiao III
Preceded by vs. Héctor Velázquez	Manny Pacquiao's bouts 21 January 2006	Succeeded by vs. Óscar Larios
