= José Navarro (boxer) =

American boxer

Personal information
- Born: June 7, 1981 (age 45) Los Angeles, California, United States

Sport
- Sport: Boxing
Medal record
Representing United States
Pan American Games
Silver medal – second place	1999 Winnipeg	Flyweight

José Navarro (born June 7, 1981) is a professional boxer who competes in the Flyweight division. Navarro participated at the Summer Olympics in 2000 in Sydney, Australia. He is of Mexican descent.

== Amateur career ==
Member of the 2000 USA Olympic Team boxing in the Flyweight class. His results were:

- Defeated Hermensen Ballo (Indonesia) 16-10
- Defeated Hicham Mesbahi (Morocco) 12-9
- Lost to Jérôme Thomas (France) 12-23

== Pro career ==
Navarro turned pro in 2001. In 2003, he became the WBC Continental Americas super flyweight champion and the International Boxing Association super flyweight champion when he defeated Reynaldo Hurtado. In 2005 at 21-0 he lost a close decision to Katsushige Kawashima for the WBC super flyweight title in Japan. In 2006 he traveled to Japan again to challenge Masamori Tokuyama for the WBC super flyweight title and lost a decision. Starting in 2012, he is now a boxing trainer working in Los Angeles.
