= Masamori Tokuyama =

Zainichi Korean boxer (born 1974)

Personal information
- Nationality: South Korean (since 2007); North Korean (until 2007)
- Born: Hong Chang-soo; September 17, 1974 (age 51) Tokyo, Japan
- Weight: Flyweight; Super-flyweight

Boxing career
- Stance: Orthodox

Boxing record
- Total fights: 36
- Wins: 32
- Win by KO: 8
- Losses: 3
- Draws: 1
- No contests: 0

Masamori Tokuyama (徳山 昌守, Tokuyama Masamori; born Hong Chang-soo; Korean: 홍창수; Hanja: 洪昌守, on September 17, 1974) is a Japanese-born Korean former professional boxer who competed from 1994 to 2006. He held the WBC super-flyweight title twice between 2000 and 2006.

Because of his affiliation with North Korea and his experience traveling to the country, he had been banned from entering South Korea and the United States. However, he changed his nationality to South Korean in February 2007. He studied Korean language at Yonsei University in South Korea in March 2007.

== The Winner Biography ==
Tokuyama was born in Tokyo, Japan as a third generation Zainichi Korean. After graduating from Tokyo Korean Junior and Senior High School, he made his professional debut in 1994, and challenged the Japanese Flyweight Title twice in 1997, but was unsuccessful both times. He won the vacant OPBF Super Flyweight Title in 1999, and defended it twice. His first world title match was against South Korean fighter In-Joo Cho in 2000, whom he beat by unanimous decision over 12 rounds, becoming the first North Korean to win a boxing world title. He defended his WBC and lineal super-flyweight titles eight times before suffering a stunning first-round knockout loss to Katsushige Kawashima in 2004. Tokuyama returned after a one-year lay-off to fight Kawashima on July 18, 2005. Tokuyama was knocked down in the last round, but dominated Kawashima for the rest of the fight, regaining his title by unanimous decision. He defended his title on February 27, 2006, beating José Navarro by unanimous decision. He relinquished his title after this fight and announced his intention to retire from boxing, but later announced that he would continue his career if he could fight Hozumi Hasegawa for the WBC bantamweight title. Tokuyama finalized his retirement on March 14, 2007, since Hasegawa declined his challenge for the bantamweight title. Tokuyama cited lack of motivation as the major reason for his retirement.

== Tokuyama and North Korea ==
Zainichi Koreans either tried to conceal their roots by adopting Japanese names, or only used their real names to show that they were Korean. However, Tokuyama did neither, using both his Japanese name (Masamori Tokuyama) and real name (Chang-soo Hong), while declaring that he is a Zainichi Korean. He has often taken politics inside the ring, carrying a North Korean flag in his entrances and wearing trunks labeled "One Korea." Many of Tokuyama's fans regard his performances as the emergence of a new generation of Zainichi Koreans, who are not afraid of their heritage, while others negatively view Tokuyama as using sports to promote a political agenda.

Tokuyama visited North Korea in 2001, and reportedly made a statement vowing allegiance to the leader of North Korea, Kim Jong Il, thanking the leader for his success as a boxer. In 2002, former Japanese prime minister Junichiro Koizumi made a visit to North Korea, which revealed the kidnappings of several Japanese citizens in the 1970s and 80s by North Korea. News of the kidnappings received huge media coverage in Japan, and Tokuyama's website was spammed relentlessly with abusive messages when it was rumored that Tokuyama commented: "They (the kidnapped Japanese citizens) might actually be living pretty happily in North Korea."

== Professional boxing record ==
36 fights	32 wins	3 losses
By knockout	8	1
By decision	24	2
Draws	1	

No.	Result	Record	Opponent	Type	Round, time	Date	Location	Notes
36	Win	32–3–1	José Navarro	UD	12	27 Feb 2006	Central Gym, Osaka, Japan	Retained WBC super-flyweight title
35	Win	31–3–1	Katsushige Kawashima	UD	12	18 Jul 2005	Central Gym, Osaka, Japan	Won WBC super-flyweight title
34	Loss	30–3–1	Katsushige Kawashima	TKO	1 (12), 1:47	28 Jun 2004	Arena, Yokohama, Japan	Lost WBC super-flyweight title
33	Win	30–2–1	Dimitri Kirilov	UD	12	3 Jan 2004	Central Gym, Osaka, Japan	Retained WBC super-flyweight title
32	Win	29–2–1	Katsushige Kawashima	UD	12	23 Jun 2003	Arena, Yokohama, Japan	Retained WBC super-flyweight title
31	Win	28–2–1	Gerry Peñalosa	SD	12	20 Dec 2002	Osaka-jō Hall, Osaka, Japan	Retained WBC super-flyweight title
30	Win	27–2–1	Erik López	RTD	6 (12), 3:00	26 Aug 2002	Super Arena, Saitama, Japan	Retained WBC super-flyweight title
29	Win	26–2–1	Kazuhiro Ryuko	TKO	9 (12), 2:42	23 Mar 202	Arena, Yokohama, Japan	Retained WBC super-flyweight title
28	Win	25–2–1	Gerry Peñalosa	UD	12	24 Sep 2001	Arena, Yokohama, Japan	Retained WBC super-flyweight title
27	Win	24–2–1	Cho In-joo	KO	4 (12), 0:45	20 May 2001	Sheraton Walker Hill Hotel, Seoul, South Korea	Retained WBC super-flyweight title
26	Win	23–2–1	Akihigo Nago	UD	12	12 Dec 2000	Maizu Arena, Osaka, Japan	Retained WBC super-flyweight title
25	Win	22–2–1	Cho In-joo	UD	12	27 Aug 2000	Prefectural Gymnasium, Osaka, Japan	Won WBC super-flyweight title
24	Win	21–2–1	Jack Siahaya	KO	2 (12), 2:55	20 May 2000	Prefectural Gymnasium, Osaka, Japan	Retained OPBF super-flyweight title
23	Win	20–2–1	Lee Kang-woong	UD	12	13 Dec 1999	Prefectural Gymnasium, Osaka, Japan	Retained OPBF super-flyweight title
22	Win	19–2–1	Pone Saengmorakot	SD	12	17 Sep 1999	Prefectural Gymnasium, Osaka, Japan	Won vacant OPBF super-flyweight title
21	Win	18–2–1	Tatsuya Imazu	UD	10	24 Jun 1999	Prefectural Gymnasium, Osaka, Japan	
20	Win	17–2–1	Takuya Kiya	MD	10	19 Apr 1999	Korakuen Hall, Tokyo, Japan	
19	Win	16–2–1	Hiroki Ioka	TKO	5 (10), 1:13	19 Dec 1998	Prefectural Gymnasium, Osaka, Japan	
18	Win	15–2–1	Katsuhiko Yoshikai	RTD	4 (10), 3:00	27 Oct 1998	Prefectural Gymnasium, Osaka, Japan	
17	Loss	14–2–1	Nolito Cabato	TD	7 (10), 1:50	25 Nov 1997	Prefectural Gymnasium, Osaka, Japan	For Japanese flyweight title; Unanimous TD
16	Win	14–1–1	Katsuhiko Yoshikai	UD	10	14 Oct 1997	Prefectural Gymnasium, Osaka, Japan	
15	Win	13–1–1	Roy Tarazona	UD	10	2 Jun 1997	Prefectural Gymnasium, Osaka, Japan	
14	Draw	12–1–1	Nolito Cabato	SD	10	5 Apr 1997	Prefectural Gymnasium, Osaka, Japan	For Japanese flyweight title
13	Win	12–1	Ricky Sales	UD	10	25 Feb 1997	Central Gym, Osaka, Japan	
12	Loss	11–1	Manny Melchor	SD	10	25 Nov 1996	Korakuen Hall, Tokyo, Japan	
11	Win	11–0	Randy Mangubat	UD	6	13 Aug 1996	Central Gym, Osaka, Japan	
10	Win	10–0	Kazumasa Otani	UD	6	17 Jul 1996	Prefectural Gymnasium, Osaka, Japan	
9	Win	9–0	Katsuyuki Kawakami	SD	6	18 Feb 1996	Prefectural Gymnasium, Osaka, Japan	
8	Win	8–0	Kenichi Matoba	UD	4	16 Dec 1995	Accion, Fukuoka, Japan	
7	Win	7–0	Ryohei Morita	UD	6	29 Oct 1995	City Hall, Nagoya, Japan	
6	Win	6–0	Tadaaki Mekaru	UD	6	18 Sep 1995	Prefectural Gymnasium, Osaka, Japan	
5	Win	5–0	Mitsushi Kawagishi	UD	4	21 Aug 1995	Prefectral Gymnasium, Osaka, Japan	
4	Win	4–0	Susumu Fujita	KO	3 (4), 1:18	17 Jun 1995	Himeji Welfare Gym, Himeji, Japan	
3	Win	3–0	Shigeru Morimoto	UD	4	10 Jan 1995	Prefectural Gymnasium, Osaka, Japan	
2	Win	2–0	Kimiaki Miyata	UD	4	5 Dec 1994	Korakuen Hall, Tokyo, Japan	
1	Win	1–0	Masahiro Ishii	KO	1 (4), 2:56	19 Sep 1994	Prefectural Gymnasium, Osaka, Japan	

== See also ==
- List of super flyweight boxing champions
- List of WBC world champions
- List of Japanese boxing world champions
- Boxing in Japan

Achievements
Preceded by In-Joo Cho	WBC super-flyweight champion August 27, 2000–June 28, 2004	Succeeded by Katsushige Kawashima
Preceded by Katsushige Kawashima	WBC super-flyweight champion July 18, 2005–December 6, 2006; Retired	Succeeded by Cristian Mijares; Interim champ promoted
