= Saen Sor Ploenchit vs. Hiroki Ioka =

1995 boxing match

Fight of Decade
- Date: October 17, 1995
- Venue: Osaka Prefectural Gymnasium, Osaka, Japan
- Title(s) on the line: WBA flyweight title

Tale of the tape
| Boxer | (Thailand) Saen Sor Ploenchit | (Japan) Hiroki Ioka |
| Nickname | "Pone II" | |
| Hometown | Thanyaburi, Pathum Thani, Thailand | Sakai, Osaka, Japan |
| Pre-fight record | 22–0–0 (4 KO) | 24–4–1 (14 KO) |
| Age | 24 years, 4 months | 26 years, 9 months |
| Height | 167 cm (5 ft 6 in) | 171.5 cm (5 ft 8 in) |
| Weight | 111.5 lb (51 kg) | 112 lb (51 kg) |
| Style | Orthodox | Orthodox |
| Recognition | WBA; Flyweight Champion; The Ring; No. 3 Ranked Flyweight | WBA; No. 3 Ranked Flyweight; The Ring; No. 7 Ranked Flyweight; 2-division World Champion |

Result
- Saen wins via 10th-round TKO

Saen Sor Ploenchit vs. Hiroki Ioka, billed in Thailand as Khu Muay Haeng Totsawat (Thai: คู่มวยแห่งทศวรรษ, "Fight of Decade"), was a professional boxing match contested on October 17, 1995, for the WBA flyweight championship.

== Background ==
At that time, Hiroki Ioka had already been a world champion in two weight divisions: the WBC 105-lb title and the WBA 108-lb title. This time, if he could win, he would become the first Japanese and Asian boxer to claim world titles in three weight classes.

Ioka was a familiar name among Thai boxing fans, having fought Napa Kiatwanchai three times in the 105-lb division during 1988–89. He drew once and lost twice, never managing to beat Napa.

This bout marked his second attempt at the flyweight world title. His first attempt ended in a TKO loss to titleholder David Grimán in June 1993. Grimán later lost the belt to Saen Sor Ploenchit in February 1994.

As for Saen Sor Ploenchit, this would be his 6th title defense, and notably, his first fight abroad. His previous five defenses between 1994 and 1995 had all taken place in various provinces across Thailand.

Ioka prepared thoroughly for this bout, training for three and a half months, logging a total of 167 rounds. His training camp was overseen by Germán Torres, and he sparred with two Filipino boxers from heavier weight classes.

Before the fight, Ioka's former rival Napa predicted that he would not be able to stop Saen. Damrong Taithong (aka Samingkao), a respected Muay Thai and professional boxing commentator, estimated Saen's chances of victory at 70–80%, and believed a knockout win was likely.

The Japanese media, meanwhile, expressed divided opinions on the outcome.

According to Saen's promoter Songchai Rattanasuban, 3–4 days prior to the bout, he was so excited he could hardly sleep.

This fight also had a significant impact on the Thai boxing community. Less than a month earlier, Chatchai Sasakul had lost to Yuri Arbachakov, a Russian boxer based in Tokyo, in a mandatory 12-round fight for the WBC flyweight title.

== The fight ==
The event took place at the Osaka Prefectural Gymnasium in Namba, Osaka, which is Ioka's hometown. The stadium was packed with 15,000 spectators, including around 150 Thai supporters, among them officials from the Thai Embassy in Japan and the Thai Consulate in Osaka. Both fighters wore 6-oz gloves from the Winning brand.

Both boxers had similar physiques. They were tall, slender, and had long arms. Their fighting styles were also comparable, based on technical boxing. In rounds 2 and 3, the challenger Ioka showed a slight edge over the Thai champion by displaying sharp footwork and quick combinations.

The fight continued into round 10. In the middle of the round, while exchanging blows at close range, Saen landed several left and right punches to Ioka's face, causing him to fall to the canvas flat on his back. When Ioka got up, blood was flowing from a cut above his left eyebrow. Referee Mitch Halpern gave an eight count and allowed the fight to continue, but Ioka staggered backward and appeared unsteady. Halpern then stopped the contest and awarded Saen Sor Ploenchit a decisive TKO victory at 2:42 of round 10.

== Aftermath ==
When the bout ended, King Bhumibol Adulyadej (Rama IX) sent a royal message to Saen and his staff through the Thai Consulate in Osaka. He stated that he had watched Saen's fight on television and praised him for his performance.

Saen revealed in the ring that the fight was still evenly matched in the early rounds, but he became confident of winning after the 4th round.

Regarding Saen Sor Ploenchit's future, Songchai Rattanasuban gave an interview before the fight saying that there was a possibility that after the bout with Ioka, Saen might have a unification match with the WBC champion, the undefeated Yuri Arbachakov. This fight might have taken place in a neutral country like the United States on the undercard of Mike Tyson under the organization of Don King. However, the fight never happened. Saen unexpectedly lost the title to Venezuelan José Bonilla late the following year and never returned as a champion again.

As for Hiroki Ioka, despite this disappointment, he continued boxing and had two more chances to challenge for a world title. He fought in the flyweight division against Bonilla, who had taken the belt from Saen, in February 1997, and in the junior bantamweight division against fellow countryman Satoshi Iida in April 1998, but was unsuccessful.

== Broadcasting ==
| Country | Broadcaster |
|---|---|
| Japan | TV Osaka |
| Thailand | Channel 3 |
