= Kim Bong-jun =

South Korean boxer

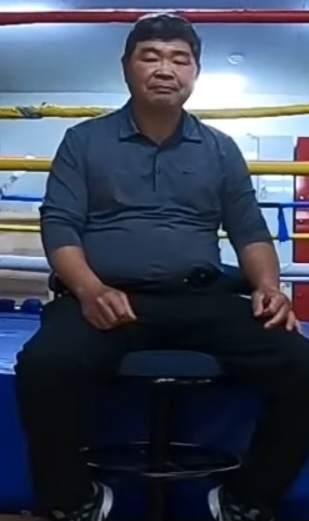

Personal information
- Nickname: Sleeping Boy
- Born: Bong Jun Kim South Korea
- Height: 5 ft 4 1/2 in (164 cm)
- Weight: Mini-flyweight; Light-flyweight

Boxing career
- Stance: Orthodox

Boxing record
- Total fights: 37
- Wins: 24
- Win by KO: 10
- Losses: 10
- Draws: 3

Kim Bong-jun is a South Korean former professional boxer who competed from 1983 to 1994. He held the WBA minimumweight title from 1989 to 1991.

== Professional career ==
Kim turned professional in 1983 and compiled a record of 14-4-3 before unsuccessfully challenging Venezuelan boxer Leo Gámez, for the inaugural WBA minimumweight title. He would get another shot at the title one year later, the result would be different this time however as he stopped Colombian challenger Agustin Garcia, in the seventh round to become world champion. He would go on to defend the title five times before losing it to compatriot Choi Hi-yong in 1991. In his next fight Kim would move up to the light flyweight division and challenge WBA champion Hiroki Ioka for the title, which he lost via unanimous decision. Kim retired two years after this fight.

== Professional boxing record ==
37 fights	24 wins	10 losses
By knockout	10	3
By decision	14	7
Draws	3	

No.	Result	Record	Opponent	Type	Round, time	Date	Location	Notes
37	Loss	24–10–3	Takashi Oba	TKO	4 (?)	1994-11-14	Japan	
36	Win	24–9–3	Maximo Barro	PTS	10 (10)	1994-10-14	Wando, South Korea	
35	Loss	23–9–3	Melchor Cob Castro	UD	10 (10)	1993-07-17	Caesars Palace, Paradise, Nevada, U.S.	
34	Loss	23–8–3	Hiroki Ioka	UD	12 (12)	1992-06-15	Prefectural Gymnasium, Osaka, Japan	For WBA light flyweight title
33	Loss	23–7–3	Choi Hi-yong	UD	12 (12)	1991-10-26	Hilton Hotel, Seoul, South Korea	For WBA minimumweight title
32	Loss	23–6–3	Choi Hi-yong	UD	12 (12)	1991-02-02	Sajik Arena, Busan, South Korea	Lost WBA minimumweight title
31	Win	23–5–3	Silverio Barcenas	MD	12 (12)	1990-11-03	Taegu Indoor Gymnasium, Daegu, South Korea	Retained WBA minimumweight title
30	Win	22–5–3	Silverio Barcenas	TD	5 (12)	1990-05-13	University Gym, Kunsan, South Korea	Retained WBA minimumweight title
29	Win	21–5–3	Petchthai Chuvatana	KO	4 (12)	1990-02-10	Sangmu Gymnasium, Seongnam, South Korea	Retained WBA minimumweight title
28	Win	20–5–3	John Arief	TKO	9 (12)	1989-10-22	Pohang Indoor Gymnasium, Pohang, South Korea	Retained WBA minimumweight title
27	Win	19–5–3	Sam Joong Lee	MD	12 (12)	1989-08-06	Student Gymnasium, Samcheonpo, South Korea	Retained WBA minimumweight title
26	Win	18–5–3	Agustin Garcia	TKO	7 (12)	1989-04-16	Pohang Gymnasium, Pohang, South Korea	Won vacant WBA minimumweight title
25	Win	17–5–3	Armando Tenoria	KO	2 (10)	1989-01-29	Pohang, South Korea	
24	Win	16–5–3	Sung Kon Lee	KO	3 (8)	1988-10-29	Municipal Ground, Ansan, South Korea	
23	Win	15–5–3	Nana Suhana	PTS	10 (10)	1988-04-09	Jinju, South Korea	
22	Loss	14–5–3	Leo Gámez	UD	12 (12)	1988-01-10	Kudok Gymnasium, Busan, South Korea	For vacant WBA minimumweight title
21	Win	14–4–3	Hi Chung Noh	KO	3 (8)	1987-09-13	Student Gymnasium, Jinju, South Korea	
20	Draw	13–4–3	Eul Chul Jung	TD	2 (8)	1987-06-14	Hawaii Hotel, Bugok, South Korea	
19	Win	13–4–2	Chung Bok Park	TKO	4 (8)	1987-03-14	Chuncheon, South Korea	
18	Win	12–4–2	Seung Yub Kang	TD	5 (10)	1987-01-24	Uijeongbu City, South Korea	
17	Win	11–4–2	Dok Hyun Kim	KO	3 (8)	1986-12-20	Bucheon, South Korea	
16	Loss	10–4–2	Ha Shik Lim	TD	4 (10)	1986-10-25	Uijeongbu City, South Korea	For vacant South Korean light flyweight title
15	Win	10–3–2	Sung Kyu Kim	TD	8 (6)	1986-06-28	Girls' Commercial School, Gunsan, South Korea	
14	Win	9–3–2	Hideyuki Ohashi	PTS	10 (10)	1986-03-20	Korakuen Hall, Tokyo, Japan	
13	Win	8–3–2	Yung Sang Lee	KO	4 (8)	1986-01-11	Munhwa Gymnasium, Seoul, South Korea	
12	Win	7–3–2	Chang Young Jang	KO	2 (8)	1985-10-19	Nonsan, South Korea	
11	Win	6–3–2	Hyung Man Kim	PTS	6 (6)	1985-04-27	Hyundai Gymnasium, Ulsan, South Korea	
10	Loss	5–3–2	Joon Huh	KO	3 (6)	1985-02-16	Munhwa Gymnasium, Seoul, South Korea	
9	Draw	5–2–2	Byung Kwan Jung	PTS	6 (6)	1984-11-24	Seoul, Japan	
8	Win	5–2–1	Il Hwan Kim	PTS	6 (6)	1984-10-28	Seoul, South Korea	
7	Loss	4–2–1	Kyung Jae Chang	PTS	6 (6)	1984-06-17	Seoul, South Korea	
6	Win	4–1–1	Kyoo Shik Jo	PTS	4 (4)	1984-04-06	Seoul, South Korea	
5	Draw	3–1–1	Kyoo Shik Jo	PTS	4 (4)	1984-02-12	Munhwa Gymnasium, Seoul, South Korea	
4	Loss	3–1	Sung Jae Kim	KO	2 (4)	1983-12-14	Seoul, South Korea	
3	Win	3–0	Duk Sang Kim	PTS	4 (4)	1983-12-12	Munhwa Gymnasium, Seoul, South Korea	
2	Win	2–0	Byung Kab Kim	PTS	4 (4)	1983-12-10	Munhwa Gymnasium, Seoul, South Korea	
1	Win	1–0	Yang Chun Oh	PTS	4 (4)	1983-07-23	Seoul, South Korea	

== See also ==
- List of Korean boxers
- List of world mini-flyweight boxing champions

Sporting positions
World boxing titles
Vacant Title last held by Leo Gámez	WBA minimumweight champion April 16, 1989 – February 2, 1991	Succeeded by Choi Hi-yong
