= Keiji Yamaguchi =

Keiji Yamaguchi (山口圭司 Yamaguchi Keiji, born February 17, 1974) is a former professional boxer from Hakodate, Hokkaido, Japan. Yamaguchi held the WBA light flyweight championship of the world, defeating Panamanian champion Carlos Murillo in 1996 via a 12th-round split decision. He became Japan's 37th world champion.

After winning the world championship, he defended the title only once, defeating his old rival Carlos Murillo in mid-1996 by unanimous decision after twelve rounds. Later that year, in a surprising upset, he lost the title by TKO in just the second round to Thai challenger Pichit Chor Siriwat (formerly known as Pichitnoi Sitbangprachan) in a bout at Osaka Prefectural Gymnasium. During the fight, he ducked to avoid a left punch, but as he raised his head, he was caught cleanly by a devastating right hook from Chor Siriwat. He went down hard, and although he managed to get back on his feet, he was clearly unfit to continue. The referee then stepped in and stopped the fight.

Yamaguchi is known as a Japanese boxer who had multiple opportunities to fight for world titles. His first world title shot came in 1995 against South Korea's Choi Hi-yong, but he was defeated via a 12th-round split decision.

He went on to challenge for two more world titles: the WBA flyweight title against Venezuela's José Bonilla in 1997, and the WBC super flyweight title against South Korea's In-Joo Cho in 1999. He was unsuccessful in both. He also fought for the WBC super flyweight international title against former Filipino world champion Gerry Peñalosa in 2001 in the Philippines, but lost by first-round TKO.

He was nicknamed "Prince" because his idol was Naseem Hamed, the British-Yemeni superstar in the featherweight division. Yamaguchi adopted Hamed's flashy fighting style and even imitated his trunks design.

== See also ==
- List of WBA world champions
- List of light flyweight boxing champions
- List of Japanese boxing world champions
- Boxing in Japan

Achievements
Preceded by Carlos Murillo	WBA Light Flyweight Champion; May 21, 1996 – December 3, 1996	Succeeded by Pichitnoi Sitbangprachan
