= Ioka =

Ioka may refer to:

== Places ==
- Ioka, Utah, an unincorporated community in eastern Duchesne County, Utah, United States

== People with the surname ==
- Hiroki Ioka (井岡 弘樹, born 1969), Japanese boxer
- Kazuto Ioka (井岡 一翔, born 1989), Japanese boxer, nephew of Hiroki
