= Saen Sor Ploenchit =

Thai boxer

Saen Sor Ploenchit (แสน ส.เพลินจิต)
Personal information
- Nickname: Pone II (โผน 2)
- Nationality: Thai
- Born: Somchai Chertchai (สมชาย เชิดฉาย); May 18, 1971 (age 55) Prachathipat, Thanyaburi, Pathum Thani, Thailand
- Height: 5 ft 6 in (168 cm)
- Weight: Flyweight; Super-flyweight

Boxing career
- Stance: Orthodox

Boxing record
- Total fights: 47
- Wins: 44
- Win by KO: 14
- Losses: 3

Saen Sor Ploenchit (Thai: แสน ส.เพลินจิต, born May 18, 1971) is a Thai former professional boxer who competed from 1990 to 2003. He held the WBA flyweight title from 1994 to 1996.

== Early life ==
Sor Ploenchit was born as Somchai Chertchai (สมชาย เชิดฉาย; personal nickname: Neng; เหน่ง) in Thanyaburi district, Pathum Thani province. Due to poverty, he had to take on various jobs, from carrying water for one baht per bucket to helping his family sell damaged and discarded fruits at low prices at Talat Si Mum Mueang, the largest wholesale fruit market in his hometown, Rangsit.

He became a boxer as a child, starting with Muay Thai under the names "Superneng Loh-ngoen" (ซุปเปอร์เหน่ง โล่ห์เงิน) and "Doenna Loh-ngoen" (เดินหน้า โล่ห์เงิน), before turning to professional boxing in 1990 with help from Songchai Rattanasuban.

== Boxing career ==
On February 13, 1994, he defeated David Grimán in Chachoengsao province to claim the world championship title, which he successfully defended several times against notable opponents such as Jesús "Kiki" Rojas, Aquiles Guzmán, Kim Yong-kang, and Danny "Bazooka" Núñez. The most significant defense came on October 17, 1995, when he TKO'd Hiroki Ioka, a former WBC strawweight and WBA junior-flyweight world champion, in the 10th round at the Osaka Prefectural Gymnasium in Osaka, Japan. After the bout, King Bhumibol Adulyadej (Rama IX) sent a royal congratulatory letter to him and his team through the Thai Consulate in Osaka. He went on to retain the title through three more matches, including a notable victory over Leo Gámez, before eventually losing it to José Bonilla, a Venezuelan contender.

He later switched stable, joining Wirat Wachirarattanawong, and moved up to super-flyweight in hopes of becoming a world champion once again.

His final fight was in late 2002, a loss by TKO in the 6th round to Joichiro Tatsuyoshi, a Japanese former two-time WBC bantamweight world champion.

== Boxing style ==
Sor Ploenchit was a stylistic boxer. Although he lacked explosive power and heavy hands, he was highly skilled, known for his crisp jab and excellent agility. His style resembled that of Thailand's first world champion, Pone Kingpetch. He was immensely popular among Thai boxing fans, earning him the nickname Pone II.

== Retirement ==
After retirement, Sor Ploenchit’s life took a downturn. More than half of the gold necklaces he had acquired during his glory days, which were given to him by various sponsors in keeping with a Thai pre-fight custom, were later revealed to be fake.

== Professional boxing record ==
47 fights	44 wins	3 losses
By knockout	14	2
By decision	30	1

No.	Result	Record	Opponent	Type	Round, time	Date	Location	Notes
47	Loss	44–3	Shoji Kimura	TKO	10 (10), 1:12	19 Oct 2003	Bunka Gym, Yokohama, Japan	
46	Loss	44–2	Joichiro Tatsuyoshi	TKO	6 (10), 1:10	15 Dec 2002	Prefectural Gymnasium, Osaka, Japan	
45	Win	44–1	Richard Carillo	UD	10	21 Feb 2002	Wat Temple Banrai, Nakhon Ratchasima, Thailand	
44	Win	43–1	Joel Junio	PTS	10	8 Sep 2001	Bangkok, Thailand	
43	Win	42–1	Marcelo Alquizar	TKO	5 (10)	27 Apr 2001	Bang Saphan, Prachuap Khiri Khan, Thailand	
42	Win	41–1	Marlon Castañeda	PTS	8	2 Jan 2001	Rayong, Rayong Province, Thailand	
41	Win	40–1	Marat Mazimbayev	UD	10	19 Aug 2000	Sukhothai, Sukhothai Province, Thailand	
40	Win	39–1	Rommel Libradilla	KO	8	15 Jul 2000	Bangkok, Thailand	
39	Win	38–1	Joseph Paden	KO	4	5 Feb 2000	The Mall Department Store, Bangkok, Thailand	
38	Win	37–1	Henry Limpin	TKO	5	28 Nov 1999	Pattaya, Chonburi Province, Thailand	
37	Win	36–1	Maximo Barro	PTS	10	17 Sep 1999	Pakpanag Metropolitan Stadium, Nakhon Si Thammarat, Thailand	
36	Win	35–1	Jimmy Aguirre	TKO	8	13 Jun 1999	Bangkok, Thailand	
35	Win	34–1	Ramil Anito	UD	10	6 Mar 1999	Buddamonton, Nakhon Pathom, Thailand	
34	Win	33–1	Nathan Barcelona	UD	10	14 Nov 1998	Bangkok, Thailand	
33	Win	32–1	Rey Llagas	PTS	10	20 Sep 1998	Samut Prakan, Samut Prakan Province, Thailand	
32	Win	31–1	Rogelio Lapian	TKO	5 (10)	12 Aug 1998	Ratchadaphisek, Bangkok, Thailand	
31	Win	30–1	Felix Marfa	TKO	10	5 Jun 1998	Bangkok, Thailand	
30	Win	29–1	Rolando Pascua	UD	10	1 May 1998	Kanchanaburi Stadium, Kanchanaburi, Thailand	
29	Win	28–1	Rico Paquibot	TKO	8	27 Feb 1998	Specially Built Arena, Ko Samui, Thailand	
28	Win	27–1	Ramil Gevero	PTS	10	6 Feb 1998	Ratchadaphisek, Bangkok, Thailand	
27	Loss	26–1	José Bonilla	UD	12	24 Nov 1996	Provincial Stadium, Ubon Ratchathani, Thailand	Lost WBA flyweight title
26	Win	26–0	Aleksandr Makhmutov	UD	12	8 Sep 1996	Provincial Soccer Stadium, Nakhon Phanom, Thailand	Retained WBA flyweight title
25	Win	25–0	Leo Gámez	SD	12	24 Mar 1996	Zeer Shopping Center, Rangsit, Thailand	Retained WBA flyweight title
24	Win	24–0	Jang Young-soon	UD	12	14 Jan 1996	Municipal Hall Grounds, Nonthaburi, Thailand	Retained WBA flyweight title
23	Win	23–0	Hiroki Ioka	TKO	10 (12), 2:42	17 Oct 1995	Prefectural Gymnasium, Osaka, Japan	Retained WBA flyweight title
22	Win	22–0	Evangelio Pérez	UD	12	7 May 1995	Ank-Seng Samakee Stadium, Hat Yai, Thailand	Retained WBA flyweight title
21	Win	21–0	Danny Núñez	TKO	11 (12)	25 Dec 1994	Provincial Stadium, Rayong, Thailand	Retained WBA flyweight title
20	Win	20–0	Kim Yong-kang	UD	12	25 Sep 1994	Municipal Stadium, Kanchanaburi, Thailand	Retained WBA flyweight title
19	Win	19–0	Aquiles Guzmán	MD	12	12 Jun 1994	Watthana Nakhon, Sa Kaeo, Thailand	Retained WBA flyweight title
18	Win	18–0	Jesús Rojas	UD	12	10 Apr 1994	Anusom Stadium, Samut Prakan, Thailand	Retained WBA flyweight title
17	Win	17–0	David Grimán	UD	12	13 Feb 1994	Provincial Gymnasium, Chachoengsao, Thailand	Won WBA flyweight title
16	Win	16–0	Antonio Pérez	PTS	10	3 Oct 1993	Provincial Stadium, Chaiyaphum, Thailand	
15	Win	15–0	Isagani Pumar	PTS	10	11 Jul 1993	Provincial Stadium, Nakhon Sawan, Thailand	
14	Win	14–0	Dan Nietes	PTS	10	6 Mar 1993	Outdoor Stadium, Uttaradit, Thailand	
13	Win	13–0	Jess Maca	PTS	10	24 Jan 1993	Bangkok, Thailand	
12	Win	12–0	Melvin Magaramo	PTS	8	10 Nov 1992	Bangkok, Thailand	
11	Win	11–0	Samanchai Chalermsri	PTS	6	17 Aug 1992	Bangkok, Thailand	
10	Win	10–0	Sakchai Siammastoree	KO	2	27 Jul 1992	Bangkok, Thailand	
9	Win	9–0	Rojanadej Sor Thassanee	PTS	6	6 Apr 1992	Bangkok, Thailand	
8	Win	8–0	Vihok Jockygym	KO	5	3 Feb 1992	Bangkok, Thailand	
7	Win	7–0	Rungsak Sorthanikul	PTS	6	6 Jan 1992	Bangkok, Thailand	
6	Win	6–0	Samanchai Chalermsri	PTS	6	4 Nov 1991	Bangkok, Thailand	
5	Win	5–0	Suvatchai Chalermsri	PTS	6	19 Sep 1991	Bangkok, Thailand	
4	Win	4–0	Ongkot Sithseemok	KO	1	19 Aug 1991	Bangkok, Thailand	
3	Win	3–0	Srinarong Sithseemok	PTS	6	9 Jul 1991	Bangkok, Thailand	
2	Win	2–0	Chaiyarit Kongudom	PTS	6	4 Mar 1991	Bangkok, Thailand	
1	Win	1–0	Seeharach Chorvikul	PTS	6	25 Feb 1990	Bangkok, Thailand	

== Muay Thai record ==
Muay Thai record
Date	Result	Opponent	Event	Location	Method	Round	Time
1990-06-22	Win	(Thailand) Pimarannoi Sit-Aran	Rangsit Stadium	Thailand	Decision	5	3:00
1989-	Win	(Thailand) Saengdao Por.Bonnya	Rangsit Stadium	Thailand	Decision	5	3:00
Legend: Win Loss Draw/No contest Notes

== See also ==
- List of flyweight boxing champions

Achievements
Preceded by David Grimán	WBA flyweight champion February 13, 1994 – November 24, 1996	Succeeded by José Bonilla
