= Carlos Murillo (boxer) =

Panamanian boxer

Personal information
- Nickname: Puas
- Born: Carlos Ernesto Murillo Duarte; December 10, 1970 (age 55) Panama
- Height: 5 ft 1 in (155 cm)
- Weight: Mini flyweight; Light flyweight; Flyweight

Boxing career
- Reach: 63 in (160 cm)
- Stance: Orthodox

Boxing record
- Total fights: 50
- Wins: 38
- Win by KO: 29
- Losses: 11
- Draws: 1

Carlos Ernesto Murillo Duarte (born December 10, 1970) is a Panamanian former professional boxer who competed from 1990 to 2005. He held the World Boxing Association light flyweight title in 1996.

== Professional career ==
Murillo turned professional in 1990 and amassed a record of 32–2 before he beat Choi Hi-yong to win the WBA light flyweight title. At the time he was seen as the next Panamanian boxing superstar after Roberto Durán. He would go on to lose the title four months later Keiji Yamaguchi. Murillo would get another world title opportunity this time against Colombia's Mauricio Pastrana; he would lose via ninth round stoppage.

One of his trainers was María Toto.

== Professional boxing record ==
50 fights	38 wins	11 losses
By knockout	29	4
By decision	9	7
Draws	1	

No.	Result	Record	Opponent	Type	Round, time	Date	Location	Notes
50	Loss	38–11–1	Go Onaga	KO	1 (6)	2005-12-10	Chatan Dome, Okinawa, Japan	For vacant WBA Fedecaribe flyweight title
49	Loss	38–10–1	Jean Piero Pérez	KO	3 (10)	2005-11-25	Atlapa Convention Centre, Panama City, Panama	
48	Draw	38–9–1	Jonathan Aguilar	SD	10 (10)	2005-06-03	Arena Roberto Duran, Panama City, Panama	
47	Loss	38–9	Carlos Melo	UD	10 (10)	2005-04-16	Arena Roberto Duran, Panama City, Panama	
46	Win	38–8	Jonathan Aguilar	UD	8 (8)	2004-10-01	Figali Convention Center, Fort Amador, Panama	
45	Loss	37–8	Jose Plinio Gonzalez	UD	6 (6)	2002-08-30	Jardín La Macaraquena, 24 de Diciembre, Panama	
44	Loss	37–7	Edison Torres	UD	10 (10)	1999-07-03	Balboa Civic Center, Panama City, Panama	
43	Loss	37–6	Mauricio Pastrana	TKO	9 (12)	1998-08-29	Las Vegas Hilton, Winchester, Nevada, U.S.	For vacant IBF light flyweight title
42	Win	37–5	Nelson Dieppa	SD	10 (10)	1998-02-13	University Arena, Albuquerque, New Mexico, U.S.	
41	Win	36–5	Royers Vasquez	TKO	7 (12)	1997-11-15	Gimnasio Nuevo Panama, Panama City, Panama	
40	Loss	35–5	Joma Gamboa	TKO	1 (12)	1997-09-27	Gymnasio Jose Beracasa, Caracas, Venezuela	Retained WBA Fedelatin light flyweight title
39	Win	35–4	Virgilio Chifundo	UD	12 (12)	1997-02-28	Arena Panama Al Brown, Colon City, Panama	Won WBA Fedelatin light flyweight title
38	Loss	34–4	Keiji Yamaguchi	UD	12 (12)	1996-08-13	Central Gymnasium, Osaka, Japan	For WBA light flyweight title
37	Loss	34–3	Keiji Yamaguchi	SD	12 (12)	1996-05-21	Prefectural Gymnasium, Osaka, Japan	Lost WBA light flyweight title
36	Win	34–2	Jose Garcia Bernal	TKO	10 (12)	1996-03-15	Gimnasio Nuevo Panama, Panama City, Panama	Retained WBA light flyweight title
35	Win	33–2	Choi Hi-yong	UD	12 (12)	1996-01-13	Jai Alai Fronton, Miami, Florida, U.S.	Won WBA light flyweight title
34	Win	32–2	Rafael Orozco	KO	6 (12)	1995-09-16	Mirage Hotel & Casino, Las Vegas, Nevada, U.S.	Retained WBA Fedelatin light flyweight title
33	Win	31–2	Ignacio Aguilar	UD	12 (12)	1995-07-15	Gimnasio La Salle, Managua, Nicaragua	Won WBC FECARBOX light flyweight title
32	Win	30–2	Sergio Moreno	KO	2 (10)	1995-05-20	Gimnasio Nuevo Panama, Panama City, Panama	
31	Win	29–2	German Caceres	KO	2 (8)	1995-04-29	Gimnasio Escolar, David, Panama	
30	Win	28–2	Benedicto Murillo	TKO	10 (12)	1995-02-04	Arena Panama Al Brown, Colon City, Panama	
29	Win	27–2	Eric Griffin	TKO	9 (12)	1994-12-15	Foxwoods Resort Casino, Ledyard, Connecticut, U.S.	Retained WBA Fedelatin light flyweight title
28	Win	26–2	Robinson Cuesta	TKO	8 (12)	1994-11-19	Arena Panama Al Brown, Colon City, Panama	Won WBA Fedelatin light flyweight title
27	Win	25–2	Stevenson Zuniga	TKO	3 (10)	1994-10-15	Arena Panama Al Brown, Colon City, Panama	
26	Win	24–2	Lee Sandoval	TKO	5 (10)	1994-09-03	Colon City, Panama	
25	Loss	23–2	Chana Porpaoin	MD	12 (12)	1994-03-26	Physical Education College, Chonburi, Thailand	For WBA minimumweight title
24	Win	23–1	Sixto Jaramillo	UD	10 (10)	1993-12-04	Gimnasio Nuevo Panama, Panama City, Panama	
23	Win	22–1	Carlos Eluaiza	KO	3 (12)	1993-09-24	Club Defensores de Villa Lujan, San Miguel, Tucuman, Argentina	Retained WBA Fedelatin minimumweight title
22	Win	21–1	Oscar Dante Reynoso	KO	5 (10)	1993-08-13	Club Atletico Lanus, Lanus, Buenos Aires, Argentina	
21	Loss	20–1	Chana Porpaoin	UD	12 (12)	1993-05-09	Physical Education Center, Ang Thong, Thailand	For WBA minimumweight title
20	Win	20–0	Asdrubal Velasquez	TKO	1 (10)	1992-11-28	Gimnasio Nuevo Panama, Panama City, Panama	
19	Win	19–0	Aldairo Miranda	TKO	1 (12)	1992-10-17	Gimnasio Nuevo Panama, Panama City, Panama	
18	Win	18–0	Marcelino Bolívar	TKO	5 (12)	1992-08-01	Gimnasio Nuevo Panama, Panama City, Panama	
17	Win	17–0	Manuel Germosen	TKO	1 (10)	1992-07-04	Gimnasio Nuevo Panama, Panama City, Panama	
16	Win	16–0	Andres Tavarez	TKO	3 (12)	1992-03-12	Hotel El Panama, Panama City, Panama	Retained WBA Fedelatin minimumweight title
15	Win	15–0	Reynaldo Samaniego	TKO	8 (10)	1991-12-28	Arena Panama Al Brown, Colon City, Panama	
14	Win	14–0	Uriel Londono	TKO	4 (10)	1991-10-17	Hotel El Panama, Panama City, Panama	
13	Win	13–0	Yamil Caraballo	TKO	2 (12)	1991-08-15	Hotel El Panama, Panama City, Panama	Retained WBA Fedelatin minimumweight title
12	Win	12–0	Bernardo Diaz	TKO	2 (10)	1991-07-04	Hotel El Panama, Panama City, Panama	
11	Win	11–0	Jesus Arias	TKO	5 (12)	1991-05-23	Hotel El Panama, Panama City, Panama	Retained WBA Fedelatin minimumweight title
10	Win	10–0	Manuel Garcia	TKO	3 (10)	1991-04-11	Hotel El Panama, Panama City, Panama	
9	Win	9–0	Victor Molino	TKO	4 (10)	1991-03-14	Hotel El Panama, Panama City, Panama	
8	Win	8–0	Orlando Maestre	TKO	7 (12)	1991-02-21	Hotel El Panama, Panama City, Panama	Won WBA Fedelatin minimumweight title
7	Win	7–0	Alex Miller	UD	8 (8)	1991-01-24	Hotel El Panama, Panama City, Panama	
6	Win	6–0	Santos Becerra	PTS	8 (8)	1990-12-20	Estudios de TV 2, Panama City, Panama	
5	Win	5–0	Alejandro Solis	TKO	3 (4)	1990-10-26	Hotel El Panama, Panama City, Panama	
4	Win	4–0	Ernesto Cooper	TKO	2 (6)	1990-08-30	Estudios de TV 2, Panama City, Panama	
3	Win	3–0	Alex Miller	PTS	6 (6)	1990-06-23	Gimnasio Orlando Winter, San Miguelito, Panama	
2	Win	2–0	Alejandro Solis	TKO	3 (4)	1990-06-01	Gimnasio Gringo de la Guardia, Panama City, Panama	
1	Win	1–0	Eric Aguilar	TKO	1 (4)	1990-05-05	Gimnasio Gringo de la Guardia, Panama City, Panama	

== See also ==
- List of world light-flyweight boxing champions

Sporting positions
World boxing titles
Preceded by Choi Hi-yong	WBA light flyweight champion January 13, 1996 – May 21, 1996	Succeeded by Keiji Yamaguchi
