= Choi Hi-yong =

South Korean boxer

Hi-Yong Choi
Personal information
- Born: Hi-Yong Choi; September 13, 1965 (age 61) Busan, South Korea
- Height: 5′ 4½ in (164 cm)
- Weight: Mini-flyweight; Light-flyweight

Boxing career
- Stance: Orthodox

Boxing record
- Total fights: 21
- Wins: 19
- Win by KO: 8
- Losses: 2

Hi-Yong Choi (born 13 September 1965) is a South Korean former professional boxer who competed from 1987 to 1996. He is a world champion in two weight classes, having held the World Boxing Association (WBA) mini-flyweight title from 1991 to 1992 and the WBA light-flyweight title from 1995 to 1996.

== Professional career ==
Choi turned professional in 1987 and captured the WBA mini flyweight title in 1991 in only his 10th pro bout in with a decision win over Bong-Jun Kim. He defended the belt 4 times before losing it to Hideyuki Ohashi in 1992. He later moved up in weight and in 1995 captured the WBA light flyweight title with a decision win over Leo Gamez. He lost the belt in 1996 to Carlos Murillo and retired after the bout.

== Professional boxing record ==
21 fights	19 wins	2 losses
By knockout	8	0
By decision	11	2

No.	Result	Record	Opponent	Type	Round, time	Date	Location	Notes
21	Loss	19–2	Carlos Murillo	UD	12	13 Jan 1996	Jai-Alai Fronton, Miami, Florida, U.S.	Lost WBA light-flyweight title
20	Win	19–1	Keiji Yamaguchi	SD	12	5 Sep 1995	Prefectural Gymnasium, Osaka, Japan	Retained WBA light-flyweight title
19	Win	18–1	Leo Gámez	UD	12	4 Feb 1995	Industrial Gymnasium, Ulsan, South Korea	Won WBA light-flyweight title
18	Win	17–1	Mongkonchai Sathiragym	PTS	10	27 Aug 1994	Gangneung, South Korea	
17	Win	16–1	Alpong Navaja	PTS	10	21 May 1994	Dream Land, Seoul, South Korea	
16	Win	15–1	Nilo Anosa	KO	7 (10), 1:42	4 Dec 1993	Gwangmyeong Gymnasium, Gwangmyeong, South Korea	
15	Loss	14–1	Hideyuki Ohashi	UD	12	14 Oct 1992	Ryōgoku Kokugikan, Tokyo, Japan	Lost WBA mini-flyeight title
14	Win	14–0	Rommel Lawas	TKO	3 (12), 2:59	13 Jun 1992	Incheon Gymnasium, Incheon, South Korea	Retained WBA mini-flyweight title
13	Win	13–0	Yuichi Hosono	TKO	10 (12), 1:33	22 Feb 1992	Millennium Hilton, Seoul, South Korea	Retained WBA mini-lyweight title
12	Win	12–0	Kim Bong-jun	UD	12	26 Oct 1991	Millennium Hilton, Seoul, South Korea	Retained WBA mini-flyweight title
11	Win	11–0	Sugar Ray Mike	UD	12	15 Jun 1991	Daegu Gymnasium, Daegu, South Korea	Retained WBA mini-flyweight title
10	Win	10–0	Kim Bong-jun	UD	12	2 Feb 1991	Sajik Arena, Busan, South Korea	Won WBA mini-flyweight title
9	Win	9–0	Roger Gamayot	KO	1 (10), 2:36	10 Nov 1990	Cheju Indoor Gym, Jeju, South Korea	
8	Win	8–0	Diego Onglao	KO	2 (10), 1:41	21 Jul 1990	Gwangju, South Korea	
7	Win	7–0	Hitoshi Taniuchi	KO	7 (10), 1:00	12 May 1990	Millennium Hilton, Seoul, South Korea	
6	Win	6–0	Kom Sorthanikul	KO	5 (12), 0:47	21 Jan 1990	Munhwa Gymnasium, Seoul, South Korea	Retained OPBF mini-flyweight title
5	Win	5–0	Armando Tenoria	UD	12	29 Oct 1989	Daegu, South Korea	Retained OPBF mini-flyweight title
4	Win	4–0	Lee Sam-joong	PTS	12	10 Apr 1988	88 Gymnasium, Seoul, South Korea	Won vacant OPBF mini-flyweight title
3	Win	3–0	Hwang In-kyu	PTS	10	27 Dec 1987	Uijeongbu, South Korea	
2	Win	2–0	Jun Dae-chul	PTS	8	15 Aug 1987	Uijeongbu, South Korea	
1	Win	1–0	Park Sung-kyoo	KO	3 (8), 0:59	18 Jul 1987	Boeun, South Korea	

== Titles in boxing ==
=== Major world titles ===
- WBA mini-flyweight champion (105 lbs)
- WBA light-flyweight champion (108 lbs)

=== Regional/International titles ===
- OPBF mini-flyweight champion (108 lbs)

Sporting positions
World boxing titles
Preceded by Kim Bong-jun	WBA mini-flyweight champion 2 February 1991 - 24 October 1992	Succeeded by Hideyuki Ohashi
Preceded by Leo Gamez	WBA light-flyweight champion 4 February 1995 - 13 January 1996	Succeeded by Carlos Murillo
