= Keikan Ri =

Korean boxer (born 1915)

- Hangul: 이규환
- Hanja: 李奎煥
- RR: I Gyuhwan
- MR: I Kyuhwan

Lee Kyu-Hwan (Korean: 이규환; Hanja: 李奎煥, Keikan Ri; born 14 February 1915, date of death unknown) was a South Korean boxer. He was a member of the Korean Fist Boxing Club who competed for Japan in the 1936 Summer Olympics. Because Korea was occupied by Japan at the time, he represented Japan in the Olympics under a Japanese name.

Lee studied at Waseda University, where he boxed on the university team. In 1939, he was part of an All-Japan team that beat the San Jose State University boxing team.

In 1936 he was eliminated in the first round of the welterweight class after losing his fight to the eventual gold medalist Sten Suvio.

In 1937, Lee placed first at the Meiji Jingu Games.

== See also ==
- List of Korean boxers
