= Hugo Rafael Soto =

Argentine boxer (born 1967)

Personal information
- Born: August 16, 1967 (age 58) Catamarca, Catamarca, Argentina
- Height: 5 ft 3 1/2 in (161 cm)
- Weight: Flyweight; Super flyweight; Bantamweight; Super bantamweight

Boxing career
- Stance: Orthodox

Boxing record
- Total fights: 69
- Wins: 55
- Win by KO: 38
- Losses: 10
- Draws: 2
- No contests: 2

Hugo Rafael Soto (born 16 August 1967 in San Fernando del Valle de Catamarca, Argentina) is a former professional boxer.

== Professional career ==
Fighting in the flyweight and super flyweight divisions, Soto had his first professional fight in 1988. He built up a record of 39-1-2 to earn a fight with WBC flyweight champion Yuri Arbachakov, but lost by an eighth round knockout. Two years later, he lost a unanimous decision to reigning WBO flyweight champion Johnny Tapia. He captured the WBA flyweight title in May 1998, defeating Jose Bonilla by a split decision. Soto lost the title in his first defence against Leo Gámez, who knocked him out in the third round. He had his final fight in 2004, losing a decision to future world champion Jorge Linares.

== Professional boxing record ==
69 fights	55 wins	10 losses
By knockout	38	3
By decision	16	7
By disqualification	1	0
Draws	2	
No contests	2	

No.	Result	Record	Opponent	Type	Round, time	Date	Location	Notes
69	Loss	55–10–2 (2)	Jorge Linares	UD	10 (10)	2004-01-31	El Poliedro, Caracas, Venezuela	For vacant WBA Fedelatin super bantamweight title
68	Win	55–9–2 (2)	Julio Cesar Medina	KO	7 (10)	2003-09-26	Club Ciclista Juninense, Junín, Argentina	Won Argentina bantamweight title
67	Win	54–9–2 (2)	Feliciano Dario Azuaga	TKO	10 (12)	2003-01-31	Casino Buenos Aires, Buenos Aires, Argentina	Won WBO Latino bantamweight title
66	Loss	53–9–2 (2)	Julio Cesar Medina	UD	10 (10)	2002-10-11	Mercedes, Argentina	For Argentina bantamweight title
65	Loss	53–8–2 (2)	Fabio Daniel Oliva	SD	10 (10)	2002-04-20	Catamarca, Argentina	Lost Argentina super bantamweight title
64	Win	53–7–2 (2)	Juan Jose Herrera	TKO	7 (10)	2002-02-15	Club Atlético 9 de Julio, Buenos Aires, Argentina	Won vacant Argentina super bantamweight title
63	Loss	52–7–2 (2)	Jorge Daniel Espindola	SD	8 (8)	2001-09-22	Estadio F.A.B., Buenos Aires, Argentina	
62	Win	52–6–2 (2)	Hernan German Baigorria	TKO	7 (10)	2000-11-10	Club Atletico Racing, Trelew, Argentina	
61	Loss	51–6–2 (2)	Leo Gámez	KO	3 (12)	1999-03-13	Madison Square Garden, New York City, New York, U.S.	Lost WBA flyweight title
60	Win	51–5–2 (2)	Jose Bonilla	SD	12 (12)	1998-05-29	Las Vegas Hilton, Winchester, Nevada, U.S.	Won WBA flyweight title
59	Win	50–5–2 (2)	Pedro Javier Torres	TD	4 (12)	1998-03-07	Estadio F.A.B., Buenos Aires, Argentina	
58	Win	49–5–2 (2)	Marcos Verbel	PTS	10 (10)	1997-12-13	Estadio F.A.B., Buenos Aires, Argentina	
57	Win	48–5–2 (2)	Adrian Cristian Ochoa	KO	1 (10)	1997-11-29	Estadio F.A.B., Buenos Aires, Argentina	
56	Loss	47–5–2 (2)	Samson Dutch Boy Gym	KO	6 (12)	1997-06-24	Chaiyaphum, Thailand	For WBF super-flyweight title
55	Win	47–4–2 (2)	Julio Jerez	TKO	6 (10)	1996-12-21	Andalgalá, Argentina	
54	Win	46–4–2 (2)	Yamil Valdelamar	KO	2 (10)	1996-11-22	Catamarca, Argentina	
53	Loss	45–4–2 (2)	Johnny Tapia	UD	12 (12)	1996-08-17	Sports Stadium, Albuquerque, New Mexico, U.S.	For WBO super-flyweight title
52	Win	45–3–2 (2)	William Lopez	RTD	11 (12)	1996-06-29	Catamarca, Argentina	Won IBF Inter-continental super-flyweight title
51	Win	44–3–2 (2)	Lorenzo Ruiz	TKO	4 (10)	1996-05-24	Catamarca, Argentina	
50	Win	43–3–2 (2)	Marcos Julio Uruena	KO	6 (10)	1996-04-19	Catamarca, Argentina	
49	Win	42–3–2 (2)	Victor Hugo Fuentealba	KO	2 (10)	1996-02-23	Catamarca, Argentina	
48	Loss	41–3–2 (2)	Daniel Ward	TD	8 (10)	1995-09-16	Wembley Indoor Arena, Johannesburg, South Africa	
47	Win	41–2–2 (2)	Raimundo Oliveira Ferreira	KO	2 (8)	1995-06-24	Estadio F.A.B., Buenos Aires, Argentina	
46	Win	40–2–2 (2)	Mario Crispín Romero	PTS	8 (8)	1995-02-17	Estadio Pascual Perez, Mendoza, Argentina	
45	Loss	39–2–2 (2)	Yuri Arbachakov	KO	8 (12)	1994-08-01	Ariake Coliseum, Tokyo, Japan	For WBC flyweight title
44	Win	39–1–2 (2)	Jorge Fernando Calfin	TKO	5 (10)	1994-06-26	Estadio F.A.B., Buenos Aires, Argentina	
43	NC	38–1–2 (2)	Mozart Gomes dos Santos	NC	2 (10)	1994-04-03	Estadio F.A.B., Buenos Aires, Argentina	
42	Win	38–1–2 (1)	Néstor Luis Paniagua	KO	4 (10)	1994-02-18	Mar del Plata, Argentina	
41	Win	37–1–2 (1)	Juan Benjamín Sánchez	KO	1 (10)	1993-11-27	Estadio F.A.B., Buenos Aires, Argentina	
40	Win	36–1–2 (1)	Luis Abelardo Briones	KO	2 (12)	1993-10-22	Catamarca, Argentina	Retained South American flyweight title
39	Win	35–1–2 (1)	Gilberto González	PTS	10 (10)	1993-09-18	Estadio F.A.B., Buenos Aires, Argentina	
38	Win	34–1–2 (1)	Henry Casarrubia	KO	3 (12)	1993-08-13	Catamarca, Argentina	Retained South American flyweight title
37	Win	33–1–2 (1)	Oscar Dante Reynoso	PTS	10 (10)	1993-07-31	Estadio F.A.B., Buenos Aires, Argentina	
36	Win	32–1–2 (1)	Jorge Fernando Calfin	TKO	5 (10)	1993-06-26	Estadio F.A.B., Buenos Aires, Argentina	
35	Win	31–1–2 (1)	Jose Hamilton Rodrigues	KO	2 (10)	1993-05-29	Estadio F.A.B., Buenos Aires, Argentina	
34	NC	30–1–2 (1)	Agustín José López	NC	2 (10)	1993-04-16	Catamarca, Argentina	
33	Win	30–1–2	Luis Alberto Vargas	DQ	9 (10)	1993-02-12	Catamarca, Argentina	
32	Draw	29–1–2	Julio Gudino	PTS	10 (10)	1992-08-14	La Rioja, Argentina	
31	Win	29–1–1	Ramón Alberto Chamorro	KO	2 (10)	1992-07-25	Estadio F.A.B., Buenos Aires, Argentina	
30	Win	28–1–1	Redigildo Conceicao	KO	5 (10)	1992-06-13	Catamarca, Argentina	
29	Win	27–1–1	Adrián Cristian Ochoa	PTS	12 (12)	1992-05-25	Catamarca, Argentina	Retained South American flyweight title
28	Win	26–1–1	Oscar Dante Reynoso	KO	8 (10)	1992-04-10	Catamarca, Argentina	
27	Loss	25–1–1	Adrián Cristian Ochoa	PTS	12 (12)	1992-02-22	Jesús María, Argentina	Lost Argentina flyweight title
26	Win	25–0–1	Serhiy Polygalov	KO	9 (12)	1992-04-10	Catamarca, Argentina	
25	Win	24–0–1	Héctor Fabián Jaime	TD	9 (10)	1991-06-14	Catamarca, Argentina	
24	Win	23–0–1	Claudemir Carvalho Dias	KO	6 (12)	1991-06-14	Catamarca, Argentina	Retained South American flyweight title
23	Win	22–0–1	Luis Paredes	TKO	2 (12)	1991-02-27	Quinta Vergara, Viña del Mar, Chile	Won South American flyweight title
22	Win	21–0–1	Santos Laciar	UD	10 (10)	1990-12-21	Catamarca, Argentina	
21	Win	20–0–1	Carlos Gabriel Salazar	RTD	8 (12)	1990-11-16	Catamarca, Argentina	Won Argentina flyweight title
20	Win	19–0–1	Ceferino Antonio Ponce	PTS	10 (10)	1990-11-02	Catamarca, Argentina	
19	Win	18–0–1	Raul Ojeda	PTS	10 (10)	1990-10-26	Red Star Club, Catamarca, Argentina	
18	Win	17–0–1	Miguel Angel Rodriguez	TKO	7 (10)	1990-09-07	Catamarca, Argentina	
17	Draw	16–0–1	Ruben Condori	PTS	10 (10)	1990-06-08	Catamarca, Argentina	
16	Win	16–0	Oscar Moreno	KO	1 (10)	1990-04-20	Catamarca, Argentina	
15	Win	15–0	Sergio Andres Carlevaris	PTS	10 (10)	1990-03-23	Catamarca, Argentina	
14	Win	14–0	Luis Americo Diaz	TKO	7 (10)	1990-02-09	Catamarca, Argentina	
13	Win	13–0	Ramon Machuga	KO	1 (10)	1990-01-17	Villa Las Pirquitas, Argentina	
12	Win	12–0	Fernando Bobadilla	KO	3 (10)	1989-12-01	Catamarca, Argentina	
11	Win	11–0	Sergio Andres Carlevaris	PTS	10 (10)	1989-10-13	Catamarca, Argentina	
10	Win	10–0	Roberto Ledesma	KO	1 (10)	1989-09-15	Catamarca, Argentina	
9	Win	9–0	Ramon Jose Cufre	KO	4 (10)	1989-08-18	Catamarca, Argentina	
8	Win	8–0	Sergio Andres Carlevaris	PTS	10 (10)	1989-06-02	Catamarca, Argentina	
7	Win	7–0	Ramon Mercedes Gonzalez	KO	2 (10)	1989-04-14	Catamarca, Argentina	
6	Win	6–0	David Valentin Lopez	KO	1 (8)	1989-03-17	Catamarca, Argentina	
5	Win	5–0	Antonio Ricardo Eusebio Andrada	PTS	8 (8)	1989-01-21	Catamarca, Argentina	
4	Win	4–0	Ceferino Antonio Ponce	RTD	4 (6)	1988-12-23	Catamarca, Argentina	
3	Win	3–0	Oscar Adolfo Vargas	KO	5 (6)	1988-11-19	Catamarca, Argentina	
2	Win	2–0	Antonio Ricardo Eusebio Andrada	PTS	6 (6)	1988-10-07	Catamarca, Argentina	
1	Win	1–0	Luis Paredes	KO	6 (6)	1988-08-05	Valdivia, Chile	

== See also ==
- List of world flyweight boxing champions

Sporting positions
Regional boxing titles
Preceded by Carlos Gabriel Salazar	Argentine flyweight champion November 16, 1990 – February 22, 1992	Succeeded by Adrian Cristian Ochoa
Vacant Title last held by Carlos Gabriel Salazar	South American flyweight champion February 27, 1991 – 1994; Vacated	Vacant Title next held by Jose Humberto Lagos
Vacant Title last held by Ricky Matulessy	IBF Inter-Continental super-flyweight champion June 29, 1996 – 1996; Vacated	Vacant Title next held by Somsak Sithchatchawal
Vacant Title last held by Dario Azuaga	South American bantamweight champion March 7, 1998 – May 29, 1998; Won world title	Vacant Title next held by Marcos Oscar Garro
Vacant Title last held by Jorge Antonio Paredes	Argentine super-bantamweight champion February 15, 2002 – April 20, 2002	Succeeded by Fabio Daniel Oliva
Preceded by Dario Azuaga	WBO Latino bantamweight champion January 31, 2003 – 2004; Vacated	Vacant Title next held by Mauricio Martínez
Preceded by Julio Cesar Medina	Argentine bantamweight champion September 26, 2003 – January 31, 2004; Retired	Vacant Title next held by Pablo David Sepúlveda
World boxing titles
Preceded by José Bonilla	WBA flyweight champion May 29, 1998 – March 13, 1999	Succeeded by Leo Gámez
