= Hiroki Ioka =

Japanese boxer (born 1969)

Personal information
- Born: 井岡 弘樹; January 8, 1969 (age 57) Sakai, Osaka, Japan
- Height: 5 ft 6 1/2 in (169 cm)
- Weight: Mini flyweight; Light flyweight; Flyweight; Super flyweight

Boxing career
- Stance: Orthodox

Boxing record
- Total fights: 42
- Wins: 33
- Win by KO: 17
- Losses: 8
- Draws: 1

Hiroki Ioka (井岡 弘樹, Ioka Hiroki; born January 8, 1969, in Sakai, Osaka, Japan) is a Japanese former professional boxer who competed from 1986 to 1999. He has held world championships in two weight classes, having held the World Boxing Council (WBC) mini-flyweight title from 1987 to 1988, and the World Boxing Association (WBA) light-flyweight title from 1991 to 1992. He was the inaugural WBC mini-flyweight champion, winning the title immediately after the mini-flyweight division was created. He is also known for defeating WBC light-flyweight champion Yuh Myung-woo, handing him the only loss of his career.

== Biography ==
Ioka entered the Miwa Tsuda Gym (current Green Tsuda Gym) while attending middle school, and made his professional debut in 1986 at the age of 17. He won the Japanese mini-flyweight title in his eighth professional fight in 1987, and fought for the newly created WBC mini-flyweight title the same year, winning by unanimous decision to become the youngest Japanese boxer to win a world title, at 18 years and 9 months old. This record remains unbroken today.

Ioka made his first defense against IBF mini-flyweight champion Kyung-Yun Lee in January, 1988, winning by knockout in the 12th round. Ioka's trainer, Eddie Townsend, was in the hospital during the fight, and died shortly after hearing that Ioka had won. Ioka made his second defense in June, 1988, against Napa Kiatwanchai of Thailand, retaining his title by a 12-round draw. The fight was highly controversial, as Kiatwanchai's side claimed that the last round was ended almost 30 seconds early in order to make the fight a draw. Ioka had almost been knocked out by Kiatwanchai in the final round. Ioka was ordered to have a rematch with Kiatwanchai for his third defense in December, 1988, and lost his title by 12-round decision. Ioka fought Kiatwanchai again in June, 1989, for his former title, but lost again by TKO in the 11th round.

Ioka moved up to the light-flyweight division and challenged undefeated champion Myung-Woo Yuh for the WBA light-flyweight title in December, 1991. Ioka won a close split-decision victory, and then defended his title twice in 1992. He met Yuh again in his third defense of the title in November, 1992, but lost by decision, losing his title.

Ioka moved up to the flyweight division in 1993, aiming to win titles in three weight classes, but lost to David Griman in round eight of the WBA flyweight title match. He would challenge for the WBA flyweight title two more times, losing by TKO both times, and challenged WBA super-flyweight champion Satoshi Iida in April, 1998, losing by a 12-round decision. In December of that year, Ioka lost a ten-round non-title match to an unranked fighter, and decided to retire from boxing. The unranked fighter was Masamori Tokuyama, who would later defend the WBC super-flyweight title nine times. Ioka's career record was 33-8-1 (17KOs).

== Post-retirement ==
He currently trains and manages young fighters at the Ioka Boxing Gym (Ioka Promotions), and appears on local television shows from time to time.

In 2000, Ioka fought a 14-year-old Koki Kameda in a two-round exhibition match, which was broadcast as part of a television documentary on the Kameda family. Kameda was training at the Green Tsuda Gym at the time, where Ioka trained for much of his career. Kameda scored a knockdown on the former two division title holder from a left straight and right hook combination, but the referee ruled it as a slip. The fight ended up as a two-round draw. Kameda would go on to controversially win one of Ioka's former titles; the WBA light-flyweight title.

His nephew, Kazuto Ioka, has won six amateur boxing titles, and is a four-weight world champion, having held the WBA and WBC mini-flyweight titles between 2011 and 2012, the WBA light-flyweight title between 2012 and 2014, the WBA flyweight title between 2015 and 2017, the WBO super-flyweight title from 2019 to 2022, and the WBA super-flyweight title from 2023 to 2024.

== Professional boxing record ==
42 fights	33 wins	8 losses
By knockout	17	5
By decision	16	3
Draws	1	

No.	Result	Record	Opponent	Type	Round, time	Date	Location	Notes
42	Loss	33–8–1	Masamori Tokuyama	TKO	5 (10), 1:13	1998–12–19	Prefectural Gymnasium, Osaka, Osaka, Japan	
41	Win	33–7–1	Jerry Pahayahay	PTS	10	1998–09–03	Korakuen Hall, Tokyo, Japan	
40	Loss	32–7–1	Satoshi Iida	MD	12	1998–04–29	Aichi Prefectural Gymnasium, Nagoya, Aichi, Japan	For WBA super-flyweight title
39	Win	32–6–1	Hidekazu Sakata	TKO	9 (10), 1:13	1998–02–03	Prefectural Gymnasium, Osaka, Osaka, Japan	
38	Win	31–6–1	Pinoy Montejo	UD	10	1997–11–18	Prefectural Gymnasium, Osaka, Osaka, Japan	
37	Loss	30–6–1	José Bonilla	TKO	7 (12), 2:49	1997–02–25	Osaka Municipal Central Gymnasium, Osaka, Osaka, Japan	For WBA flyweight title
36	Win	30–5–1	Hiroki Shinozaki	KO	4 (10), 2:35	1996–10–18	Korakuen Hall, Tokyo, Japan	
35	Win	29–5–1	Ricky Sales	PTS	12	1996–06–03	Green Arena, Hiroshima, Hiroshima, Japan	
34	Win	28–5–1	Joel Nice	KO	2 (10), 2:15	1996–03–31	City Sogo Gym, Matsumoto, Nagano, Japan	
33	Loss	27–5–1	Saen Sor Ploenchit	TKO	10 (12), 2:42	1995–10–17	Prefectural Gymnasium, Osaka, Osaka, Japan	For WBA flyweight title
32	Win	27–4–1	Kim Dong-soo	TKO	4 (10), 1:52	1995–05–09	Prefectural Gymnasium, Osaka, Osaka, Japan	
31	Win	26–4–1	Lee Escobido	UD	10	1995–01–10	Prefectural Gymnasium, Osaka, Osaka, Japan	
30	Win	25–4–1	Triffon Torralba	KO	4 (10), 1:42	1994–06–27	Prefectural Gymnasium, Osaka, Osaka, Japan	
29	Win	24–4–1	David Franco	KO	5 (10), 1:55	1994–04–13	Prefectural Gymnasium, Osaka, Osaka, Japan	
28	Win	23–4–1	John Medina	TKO	6 (10), 2:38	1993–11–08	Seaside Sports Center, Sakai, Osaka, Japan	
27	Loss	22–4–1	David Griman	TKO	8 (12), 2:38	1993–06–21	Prefectural Gymnasium, Osaka, Osaka, Japan	For WBA flyweight title
26	Win	22–3–1	Ronnie Romero	KO	2 (10), 2:31	1993–01–29	Prefectural Gymnasium, Osaka, Osaka, Japan	
25	Loss	21–3–1	Yuh Myung-woo	MD	12	1992–11–18	Prefectural Gymnasium, Osaka, Osaka, Japan	Lost WBA light-flyweight title
24	Win	21–2–1	Kim Bong-jun	UD	12	1992–06–15	Prefectural Gymnasium, Osaka, Osaka, Japan	Retained WBA light-flyweight title
23	Win	20–2–1	Noel Tunacao	UD	12	1992–03–31	Municipal Sogo Gymnasium, Kitakyushu, Fukuoka, Japan	Retained WBA light-flyweight title
22	Win	19–2–1	Yuh Myung-woo	SD	12	1991–12–17	Prefectural Gymnasium, Osaka, Osaka, Japan	Won WBA light-flyweight title
21	Win	18–2–1	Katsumi Komiyama	KO	5 (10), 1:51	1991–06–27	Prefectural Gymnasium, Osaka, Osaka, Japan	
20	Win	17–2–1	Kenji Tezuka	PTS	10	1991–04–05	Korakuen Hall, Tokyo, Japan	
19	Win	16–2–1	Max Forrosuelo	UD	10	1991–01–17	Prefectural Gymnasium, Osaka, Osaka, Japan	
18	Win	15–2–1	Jaime Aliguin	PTS	10	1990–11–24	Seaside Sports Center, Sakai, Osaka, Japan	
17	Win	14–2–1	Salagchit Sorchitphatana	UD	10	1990–07–16	Prefectural Gymnasium, Osaka, Osaka, Japan	
16	Win	13–2–1	John Ireng	KO	9 (10), 2:17	1990–04–09	Korakuen Hall, Tokyo, Japan	
15	Win	12–2–1	Udin Barahudin	UD	10	1990–01–29	Prefectural Gymnasium, Osaka, Osaka, Japan	
14	Loss	11–2–1	Napa Kiatwanchai	TKO	11 (12), 1:12	1989–06–10	Prefectural Gymnasium, Osaka, Osaka, Japan	For WBC mini-flyweight title
13	Win	11–1–1	Hidekazu Kakehashi	KO	2 (10), 1:59	1989–02–08	Prefectural Gymnasium, Osaka, Osaka, Japan	
12	Loss	10–1–1	Napa Kiatwanchai	MD	12	1988–11–13	Prefectural Gymnasium, Osaka, Osaka, Japan	Lost WBC mini-flyweight title
11	Draw	10–0–1	Napa Kiatwanchai	PTS	12	1988–06–05	Kinki University Auditorium, Osaka, Osaka, Japan	Retained WBC mini-flyweight title
10	Win	10–0	Kyung-Yung Lee	TKO	12 (12), 1:36	1988–01–31	Osaka-jō Hall, Osaka, Osaka, Japan	Retained WBC mini-flyweight title
9	Win	9–0	Mai Thomburifarm	UD	12	1987–10–18	Kinki University Auditorium, Osaka, Osaka, Japan	Won inaugural WBC mini-flyweight title
8	Win	8–0	Kenji Ono	PTS	10	1987–07–08	Prefectural Gymnasium, Osaka, Osaka, Japan	Won Japanese mini-flyweight title
7	Win	7–0	Akira Kiyono	PTS	8	1987–04–28	Prefectural Gymnasium, Osaka, Osaka, Japan	
6	Win	6–0	Hisashi Nakatomi	TKO	1 (6)	1987–02–22	Korakuen Hall, Tokyo, Japan	
5	Win	5–0	Dash Higashiho	TKO	2 (4), 1:02	1986–10–07	Sakuranomiya Skating Rink, Osaka, Osaka, Japan	
4	Win	4–0	Masao Kasai	PTS	4	1986–09–13	City Sogo Gym, Matsumoto, Nagano, Japan	
3	Win	3–0	Osamu Uemoto	KO	2 (4), 1:12	1986–03–05	Nishinari Ward Center, Osaka, Osaka, Japan	
2	Win	2–0	Hiroshi Udo	KO	2 (4), 1:44	1986–02–10	Prefectural Gymnasium, Kōchi, Kōchi, Japan	
1	Win	1–0	Yukio Yorimochi	KO	3 (4), 0:45	1986–01–23	Korakuen Hall, Tokyo, Japan	

== Titles in boxing ==
=== Major world titles ===
- WBC mini-flyweight champion (105 lbs)
- WBA light-flyweight champion (108 lbs)

=== Regional/International titles ===
- Japanese mini-flyweight champion (105 lbs)

== See also ==
- List of WBA world champions
- List of WBC world champions
- List of Japanese boxing world champions
- Boxing in Japan

Sporting positions
World boxing titles
Inaugural champion	WBC mini-flyweight champion 18 October 1987 – 13 November 1988	Succeeded by Napa Kiatwanchai
Preceded by Yuh Myung-Woo	WBA light-flyweight champion 17 December 1991 – 18 November 1992	Succeeded by Yuh Myung-Woo
