= Hideyuki Ohashi =

Japanese boxer

Personal information
- Born: Hideyuki Ohashi; March 8, 1965 (age 61) Yokohama, Japan
- Weight: Mini-flyweight; Light-flyweight

Boxing career
- Stance: Orthodox

Boxing record
- Total fights: 24
- Wins: 19
- Win by KO: 12
- Losses: 5

Hideyuki Ohashi (大橋 秀行, Ōhashi Hideyuki; born March 8, 1965) is a Japanese former professional boxer and two-time mini-flyweight world champion having held the World Boxing Council (WBC) mini-flyweight title in 1990 and the World Boxing Association (WBA) mini-flyweight title from 1992 to 1993.

== Professional career ==
Ohashi dropped out of college to begin a professional boxing career, and made his debut in February, 1985, with the Yonekura Boxing Gym. He won the vacant Japanese Light flyweight title in his 6th professional fight, and in December 1986, he challenged Jung-Koo Chang for the WBC Light flyweight title, but lost by TKO in the 5th round. Ohashi reclaimed the Japanese Light flyweight title in January 1988, and challenged Chang for the second time in June of the same year, only to lose again by 8th-round TKO. This was Chang's 15th consecutive defense of the WBC title, and Ohashi was knocked down a total of 7 times in 8 rounds before the referee stopped the contest.

Ohashi challenged Jum-Hwan Choi in January 1990 for the Lineal and WBC Minimumweight title, and won by KO to claim his first world title. This win stopped the streak of 21 losses in a row suffered in world title bouts by Japanese boxers. There had been no Japanese world champions for over a year before Ohashi won the WBC title.

Ohashi defended his title once, before losing to the legendary Ricardo López by TKO in the 5th round. López would go on to defend the WBC title won from Ohashi 22 times, and retire undefeated.

After two years away from the world stage, Ohashi returned to fight WBA Minimumweight champion Hi-Yong Choi in October 1992. Ohashi won a unanimous 12-round decision to claim his second world title. He lost to Chana Porpaoin in his first defense, and was forced into retirement at the age of 27, after it was discovered that he had a detached retina. He ended his career with a record of 19-5-0 (12KOs).

== Post-retirement ==
After retiring, he created the Ohashi Boxing Gym (Ohashi Promotions) and currently works as a promoter and manager there. Boxers promoted by Ohashi includes Katsushige Kawashima (former WBC Super flyweight champion), Akira Yaegashi (a three-weight world champion), Naoya Inoue (Undisputed champion of Super bantamweight), and Takuma Inoue (WBC Bantamweight champion).

In January 2007, Ohashi served as the head trainer of the Japanese team in the BOXING GRAND PRIX 2007 event (held under the partnership of the Teiken Boxing Gym, and Golden Boy Promotions).

He also serves as the president of Japan Pro Boxing Association (JPBA) and its subsidiary body East Japan Boxing Association (JPBA-east).

== Professional boxing record ==
24 fights	19 wins	5 losses
By knockout	12	3
By decision	7	2

No.	Result	Record	Opponent	Type	Round, time	Date	Location	Notes
24	Loss	19–5	Chana Porpaoin	MD	12	10 Feb 1993	Tokyo Metropolitan Gymnasium, Tokyo, Japan	Lost WBA mini-flyweight title
23	Win	19–4	Choi Hi-yong	UD	12	14 Oct 1992	Ryōgoku Kokugikan, Tokyo, Japan	Won WBA mini-flyweight title
22	Win	18–4	Joe Constantino	KO	6 (10), 2:01	2 Jun 1992	Korakuen Hall, Tokyo, Japan	
21	Win	17–4	Hwang In-kyu	PTS	10	17 Dec 1991	Korakuen Hall, Tokyo, Japan	
20	Win	16–4	Rico Macaubos	KO	5 (10), 1:19	20 Aug 1991	Korakuen Hall, Tokyo, Japan	
19	Win	15–4	Julius Planas	KO	7 (10), 1:10	23 Apr 1991	Korakuen Hall, Tokyo, Japan	
18	Loss	14–4	Ricardo López	TKO	5 (12), 2:00	25 Oct 1990	Korakuen Hall, Tokyo, Japan	Lost WBC mini-flyweight title
17	Win	14–3	Napa Kiatwanchai	UD	12	8 Jun 1990	Korakuen Hall, Tokyo, Japan	Retained WBC mini-flyweight title
16	Win	13–3	Choi Jum-hwan	KO	9 (12), 2:11	7 Feb 1990	Korakuen Hall, Tokyo, Japan	Won WBC mini-flyweight title
15	Win	12–3	Boy Kid Emilia	KO	2 (10), 2:49	3 Oct 1989	Korakuen Hall, Tokyo, Japan	
14	Win	11–3	Lee Jae-man	TKO	7 (10), 1:40	25 Apr 1989	Korakuen Hall, Tokyo, Japan	
13	Win	10–3	Joel Revilla	KO	2 (10), 2:10	7 Mar 1989	Korakuen Hall, Tokyo, Japan	
12	Win	9–3	Romy Ceniza	KO	3 (10), 2:29	18 Oct 1988	Korakuen Hall, Tokyo, Japan	
11	Loss	8–3	Chang Jung-koo	TKO	8 (12), 1:47	27 Jun 1988	Korakuen Hall, Tokyo, Japan	For WBC light-flyweight title
10	Win	8–2	Tomohiro Kiyuna	PTS	10	11 Jan 1988	Korakuen Hall, Tokyo, Japan	Won Japanese light-flyweight title
9	Win	7–2	Yasutaka Sakurai	UD	10	8 Sep 1987	Korakuen Hall, Tokyo, Japan	
8	Win	6–2	Shin Sayama	KO	3 (10), 1:54	7 Apr 1987	Korakuen Hall, Tokyo, Japan	
7	Loss	5–2	Chang Jung-koo	TKO	5 (12), 1:55	14 Dec 1986	Sunin Gymnasium, Incheon, South Korea	For WBC light-flyweight title
6	Win	5–1	Yoshiaki Nojima	PTS	10	23 Jun 1986	Korakuen Hall, Tokyo, Japan	Won vacant Japanese light-flyweight title
5	Loss	4–1	Kim Bong-jun	PTS	10	20 Mar 1986	Korakuen Hall, Tokyo, Japan	
4	Win	4–0	Shin Sayama	KO	3 (10), 1:03	3 Dec 1985	Korakuen Hall, Tokyo, Japan	
3	Win	3–0	Tadashi Kuramochi	KO	1 (10), 2:47	27 Aug 1985	Korakuen Hall, Tokyo, Japan	
2	Win	2–0	Hideto Osanai	UD	8	7 May 1985	Korakuen Hall, Tokyo, Japan	
1	Win	1–0	Masakatsu Aikata	KO	1 (6), 2:25	12 Feb 1985	Korakuen Hall, Tokyo, Japan	

== See also ==
- List of Mini-flyweight boxing champions
- List of WBA world champions
- List of WBC world champions
- List of Japanese boxing world champions
- Boxing in Japan

Sporting positions
World boxing titles
Preceded by Jum-Hwan Choi	WBC mini-flyweight champion 7 February - 25 October 1990	Succeeded by Ricardo López
Preceded by Hi-Yong Choi	WBA mini-flyweight champion 14 October 1992 - 10 February 1993	Succeeded by Chana Porpaoin
