= Yuh Myung-woo =

Korean male boxer (born 1964)

Personal information
- Nickname: Sonagi ("Downpour")
- Born: Yuh Myung-woo; January 10, 1964 (age 62) Seoul, South Korea
- Height: 5 ft 4 in (163 cm)
- Weight: Light flyweight

Boxing career
- Reach: 65 in (165 cm)
- Stance: Orthodox

Boxing record
- Total fights: 39
- Wins: 38
- Win by KO: 14
- Losses: 1

Yuh Myung-woo (Korean: 유명우; Hanja: 柳明佑, born January 10, 1964) is a South Korean former professional boxer who competed between 1982 and 1993. He was a two-time WBA light-flyweight champion, having held the title between 1985 and 1993. Avenging his lone loss against Hiroki Ioka, he defeated every boxer he faced, including future boxing hall of famers, and is thus considered to be among the greatest South Korean boxers of all time.

== Professional career ==
Yuh started his pro career in 1982. Yuh's pro debut came against Choi Byung-bum in Chinju, on March 3. Yuh won a 4 round decision. Yuh would go on to win his next six fights, all by decision in four rounds. Yuh's first fight beyond the minimum four-round distance came against Park Hyo-yong in July 82, winning a six-round decision.

In his 8th fight, Yuh faced Kim Ki-Chang in an eight-round fight in Daegu. Yuh won a unanimous decision to remain undefeated. Kim would go on to hold both the Korean National and OPBF super-flyweight titles. Kim also earned a shot at the IBF super-flyweight title later in his career.

Two fights later, Yuh decisioned Ahn Rae-ki over eight rounds. Ahn would go on to hold the Korean National Flyweight Title and earn a title shot at the WBC flyweight title.

Yuh next decisioned future Korean National light-flyweight title-holder Lim Ha-shik, and then scored his first stoppage win with a second-round KO over Little Baguio. Baguio was a two-time Philippine National light-flyweight title holder.

Yuh's 15th pro fight proved that he was a true contender; Yuh defeated future IBF flyweight champion Jung Bi-won via a 10-round decision. He then won his first professional title in his 16th fight, capturing the vacant OPBF light-flyweight title with a 3rd round Knockout of Edwin Inocencio. This fight took place on December 2, 1984, at the Munhwa Gymnasium in Seoul, South Korea. Inocencio was the reigning Philippine National light-flyweight champion at the time.

Yuh would defend this regional title once, scoring a third-round KO over Tubagus Jaya, before scoring another victory in a non-title bout before challenging for his first world title.

On December 8, 1985, Yuh challenged reigning WBA light-flyweight champion Joey Olivo. Yuh defeated the Mexican-American champion by split decision over 15 rounds to capture his first World Title, winning by scores of 146-141, 143-145, and 148-142. Yuh became the second Korean fighter to hold this title—Kim Hwan-jin had held it briefly in 1981.

Yuh's first title defense came against future WBO light-flyweight champion Jose De Jesus. Yuh won a hard-fought 15-round unanimous decision by scores of 144-141, 144-143, and 146-141. These two would fight again two years later, with Yuh once again taking a decision.

Yuh scored three stoppage victories in his next four title defenses, including the only first-round KO victory of his career, crushing Eduardo Tunon at 2:46 of the opening round.

On September 9, 1987, future IBF flyweight champion Rodolfo Blanco would fall after eight rounds in Yuh's sixth defense, taking place at Sunin University at Incheon.

Yuh Myung-woo's 7th title defense came against career trial-horse Willy Salazar. Salazar never held a World title in his career, despite holding victories over former & future champions. Salazar would hold the NABF light-flyweight title, the Mexican National flyweight and super-flyweight titles, and the WBC Continental Americas super-flyweight title during his career. Salazar also was responsible for handing two-time world champion Danny Romero the first loss of his career.

Yuh's next four title defenses included Jose De Jesus—winning a split decision over 12 rounds—and stoppage victories over Putt Ohyuthanakom, Udin Baharudin and Katsumi Komiyama.

Yuh's 12th title defense came against Mario Alberto De Marco in June 1989. Yuh won a unanimous decision over 12 rounds by scores of 118-113, 118-115, and 119-114. Yuh then faced Japanese challengers in his next two defenses, scoring an 11th-round stoppage over Kenbun Taiho and a seventh-round KO over future OPBF flyweight champion Hisashi Tokushima.

On April 29, 1990, Yuh faced the toughest fighter of his career in his 15th title defense. Yuh defeated former WBA minimum weight champion Leo Gamez by split decision over 12 rounds. The scores were 116-113, 117-115 and 114-116. Gamez had entered this fight an undefeated fighter, with a record of 20-0. None of the judges were from South Korea.

Due to the closeness of their first outing, Yuh and Gamez faced each other in a rematch held on November 11, 1990. This time, Yuh won by unanimous decision, 116-112, 117-111 and 118-112. Gamez would go on to become one of nine men in boxing history to have held world titles in four different weight classes, later capturing the WBA light-flyweight title, the WBA flyweight title, and the WBA super-flyweight title.

Yuh Myung-woo's record 17th title defense came against Kajkong Danphuthai on April 28, 1991. Yuh knocked out Danphuthai in the tenth round.

On December 12, 1991, Yuh stepped into the ring as a heavy favorite to make his 18th defense against former WBA strawweight champion Hiroki Ioka. This fight was to be the first fight of Yuh's career held outside his native South Korea. At Prefectural Gymnasium in Osaka, Japan, Ioka won a 12-round split decision over Yuh by scores of 113-115, 117-112, and 115-113 to capture the title. All three judges for this fight, Harold Lederman, Oscar Perez, and Phil Newman, were from the United States.

After losing his title, Yuh would spend almost a year outside of the ring awaiting a rematch. During this time Ioka would make 2 successful title defenses.

On November 18, 1992, Yuh returned to Japan to the same arena where he had lost his title, to reclaim it with a 12 round majority decision over Hiroki Ioka. Yuh reclaimed his WBA light-flyweight title by scores of 114-114, 117-112, and 119-111. Once again, all three judges were from neutral countries.

Yuh would make one more appearance in the ring before retiring. On July 25, 1993, Yuh decisioned Yuichi Hosono over 12 rounds to retain his title, the only title defense of his second reign.

== Retirement ==
With family on hand, Yuh announced his retirement after this fight, leaving his career behind with a record of 38-1 (14 KO's).

== Legacy ==
Yuh made 17 successful title defenses during his first reign, the record for the light-flyweight division. Yuh's record surpassed the previous record of 15 successful title defenses in a continuous reign set by former WBC light-flyweight champion Chang Jung-koo. Yuh is one of only five fighters to have successfully defended their light-flyweight title at least 10 times in one reign: Yoko Gushiken defended the WBA light-flyweight title 13 times; Luis Estaba defended the light-flyweight title 11 times; and Saman Sorjaturong made ten successful title defenses of his light-flyweight title. Yuh was inducted to International Boxing Hall of Fame in 2013.

== Professional boxing record ==
39 fights	38 wins	1 loss
By knockout	14	0
By decision	24	1

No.	Result	Record	Opponent	Type	Round	Date	Location	Notes
39	Win	38–1	Yuichi Hosono	UD	12	Jul 25, 1993	Hyundai Hotel, Gyeongju, South Korea	Retained WBA light-flyweight title
38	Win	37–1	Hiroki Ioka	MD	12	Nov 18, 1992	Prefectural Gymnasium, Osaka Japan	Won WBA light-flyweight title
37	Loss	36–1	Hiroki Ioka	SD	12	Dec 17, 1991	Prefectural Gymnasium, Osaka Japan,	Lost WBA light-flyweight title
36	Win	36–0	Kajkong Danphuthai	TKO	10 (12), 2:06	Apr 28, 1991	Masan Gymnasium, Masan, South Korea	Retained WBA light-flyweight title
35	Win	35–0	Leo Gámez	UD	12	Nov 10, 1990	Pohang Indoor Gymnasium, Pohang, South Korea	Retained WBA light-flyweight title
34	Win	34–0	Leo Gámez	SD	12	Apr 29, 1990	Intercontinental Hotel, Seoul, South Korea	Retained WBA light-flyweight title
33	Win	33–0	Hisashi Tokushima	TKO	7 (12), 1:39	Jan 14, 1990	Sunin Gymnasium, Incheon, South Korea	Retained WBA light-flyweight title
32	Win	32–0	Kenbun Taiho	KO	11 (12), 0:48	Sep 24, 1989	Waikiki Hotel, Chungju, South Korea	Retained WBA light-flyweight title
31	Win	31–0	Mario Alberto Demarco	UD	12	Jun 11, 1989	Dankook University Gym, Cheonan, South Korea	Retained WBA light-flyweight title
30	Win	30–0	Katsumi Komiyama	TKO	10 (12), 1:18	Feb 12, 1989	Chungbuk Gymnasium, Cheongju, South Korea	Retained WBA light-flyweight title
29	Win	29–0	Udin Baharudin	TKO	7 (12), 2:40	Nov 6, 1988	Swiss Grand Hotel, Seoul, South Korea	Retained WBA light-flyweight title
28	Win	28–0	Putt Ohyuthanakorn	TKO	6 (12), 2:58	Aug 28, 1988	Sajik Gymnasium, Busan, South Korea	Retained WBA light-flyweight title
27	Win	27–0	Jose De Jesus	SD	12	Jun 12, 1988	Chungmu Gymnasium, Daejeon, South Korea	Retained WBA light-flyweight title
26	Win	26–0	Willy Salazar	UD	12	Feb 7, 1988	Munhwa Gymnasium, Seoul, South Korea	Retained WBA light-flyweight title
25	Win	25–0	Rodolfo Blanco	KO	8 (15), 2:18	Sep 20, 1987	Incheon Gymnasium, Incheon, South Korea	Retained WBA light-flyweight title
24	Win	24–0	Benedicto Murillo	TKO	15 (15), 1:29	Jun 7, 1987	Sajik Gymnasium, Busan, South Korea	Retained WBA light-flyweight title
23	Win	23–0	Eduardo Tunon	TKO	1 (15), 2:46	Mar 1, 1987	Jamsil Gymnasium, Seoul, South Korea	Retained WBA light-flyweight title
22	Win	22–0	Mario Alberto Demarco	UD	15	Nov 30, 1986	Hilton Convention Centre, Seoul, South Korea	Retained WBA light-flyweight title
21	Win	21–0	Tomohiro Kiyuna	KO	12 (15), 1:53	Jun 14, 1986	Sum-In Gymnasium, Incheon, South Korea	Retained WBA light-flyweight title
20	Win	20–0	Jose De Jesus	UD	15	Mar 9, 1986	Boxing Gymnasium, Suwon, South Korea	Retained WBA light-flyweight title
19	Win	19–0	Joey Olivo	SD	15	Dec 8, 1985	Municipal Stadium, Daegu, South Korea	Won WBA light-flyweight title
18	Win	18–0	Son Oh-kong	KO	7 (10), 1:33	Sep 8, 1985	Munhwa Gymnasium, Seoul, South Korea	
17	Win	17–0	Tubagus Jaya	KO	3 (12), 2:57	Feb 24, 1985	Seoul, South Korea	Retained OPBF light-flyweight title
16	Win	16–0	Edwin Inocencio	KO	3 (12), 1:19	Dec 2, 1984	Munhwa Gymnasium, Seoul, South Korea	Won vacant OPBF light-flyweight title
15	Win	15–0	Jung Bi-won	PTS	10	May 27, 1984	Seoul, South Korea	
14	Win	14–0	Little Baguio	KO	2 (10), 1:11	Apr 15, 1984	Munhwa Gymnasium, Seoul, South Korea	
13	Win	13–0	Lim Ha-shik	PTS	8	Dec 4, 1983	Munhwa Gymnasium, Seoul, South Korea	
12	Win	12–0	Ahn Rae-ki	PTS	8	Mar 5, 1983	Munhwa Gymnasium, Seoul, South Korea	
11	Win	11–0	Park Kyung-shik	PTS	10	Jan 18, 1983	Chungmu Gymnasium, Daejeon, South Korea	
10	Win	10–0	Kim Ki-young	PTS	8	Dec 5, 1982	Jinju, South Korea	
9	Win	9–0	Kim Ki-chang	PTS	8	Oct 30, 1982	Daegu, South Korea	
8	Win	8–0	Park Hyo-yong	PTS	6	Jul 31, 1982	Seoul, South Korea	
7	Win	7–0	Yun Man-sok	PTS	4	Jun 5, 1982	Munhwa Gymnasium, Seoul, South Korea	
6	Win	6–0	Kim Ki-soo	PTS	4	May 25, 1982	Seoul, South Korea	
5	Win	5–0	Moon Yun-lee	PTS	4	May 23, 1982	Seoul, South Korea	
4	Win	4–0	Kwon Joo-ho	PTS	4	May 21, 1982	Seoul, South Korea	
3	Win	3–0	Jang Young-chang	PTS	4	May 16, 1982	Seoul, South Korea	
2	Win	2–0	Lee Joo-young	PTS	4	Apr 28, 1982	Seoul, South Korea	
1	Win	1–0	Choi Byung-bum	PTS	4	Mar 28, 1982	Jinju, South Korea	

== See also ==
- List of world light-flyweight boxing champions
- List of Korean boxers
- Jung-Koo Chang

Sporting positions
World boxing titles
Preceded by Joey Olivo	WBA light-flyweight champion December 8, 1985 – December 17, 1991	Succeeded by Hiroki Ioka
Preceded by Hiroki Ioka	WBA light-flyweight champion November 18, 1992 – July 25, 1993; Retired	Vacant Title next held by Leo Gámez
