= Kim Yong-kang =

South Korean boxer (born 1965)

Personal information
- Nationality: South Korean
- Born: January 3, 1965 (age 61) Hwaseong, South Korea
- Height: 5 ft 7 in (170 cm)
- Weight: Light flyweight; Flyweight; Super flyweight

Boxing career
- Stance: Orthodox

Boxing record
- Total fights: 31
- Wins: 26
- Win by KO: 11
- Losses: 5

Kim Yong-kang (Korean: 김용강; Hanja: 金容江, born January 3, 1965) is a South Korean former professional boxer who competed from 1985 to 1995. He is a two-time flyweight champion, having held the WBC and The Ring titles from 1988 to 1989 and the WBA title from 1991 to 1992.

== Professional career ==
Kim turned pro in 1985 and captured the WBC and The Ring flyweight titles with a decision win over Sot Chitalada in 1988. He lost his belts in his third defense in a rematch with Chitalada.

In 1991 he won the WBA flyweight title with a decision win over Elvis Álvarez. He defended the belt twice before losing it to Aquiles Guzman in 1992.

In 1994 Kim returned for his biggest fight, for he WBA flyweight title against Saen Sor Ploenchit. The fight was staged a half mile from the Bridge over the River Kwai in Kanchanaburi, Thailand (Kleebbua Stadium or Kanchanaburi Stadium). Over 50,000 fans turned out for the free boxing event. Although Ploenchit was dropped in round one, he went on to easily outbox the former world champion Kim.

== Professional boxing record ==
31 fights	26 wins	5 losses
By knockout	11	1
By decision	15	4

No.	Result	Record	Opponent	Type	Round	Date	Location	Notes
31	Win	26–5	Leo Ramirez	UD	10	Mar 25, 1995	Jeongeup, South Korea	
30	Loss	25–5	Saen Sor Ploenchit	UD	12	Sep 25, 1994	Municipal Stadium, Kanchanaburi, Thailand	For WBA flyweight title
29	Loss	25–4	Aquiles Guzmán	UD	12	Sep 26, 1992	Pohang Gymnasium, Pohang, South Korea	Lost WBA flyweight title
28	Win	25–3	Jon Penalosa	KO	6 (12)	Mar 24, 1992	Inchon Indoor Gymnasium, Incheon, South Korea	Retained WBA flyweight title
27	Win	24–3	Leo Gámez	UD	12	Oct 5, 1991	Incheon Gymnasium, Incheon, South Korea	Retained WBA flyweight title
26	Win	23–3	Elvis Álvarez	UD	12	Jun 1, 1991	Hilton Hotel, Seoul, South Korea	Won WBA flyweight title
25	Win	22–3	Rey Cogonon	KO	5 (10)	Jan 26, 1991	Civil Arena, Uijeongbu City, South Korea	
24	Loss	21–3	Khaosai Galaxy	KO	6 (12)	Sep 29, 1990	Provincial Stadium, Suphan Buri, Thailand	For WBA super-flyweight title
23	Win	21–2	Mario Parcon	KO	6 (10)	Jul 7, 1990	Chuncheon, South Korea	
22	Win	20–2	Champ Kiatpetch	KO	2 (10)	Mar 18, 1990	Palpal Gymnasium, Seoul, South Korea	
21	Loss	19–2	Lee Yul-woo	PTS	10	Nov 25, 1989	Busan, South Korea	
20	Loss	19–1	Sot Chitalada	SD	12	Jun 3, 1989	Municipal Stadium, Trang, Thailand	Lost WBC flyweight title
19	Win	19–0	Leopard Tamakuma	UD	12	Mar 5, 1989	Prefectural Gymnasium, Aomori City, Aomori, Japan	Retained WBC flyweight title
18	Win	18–0	Emil Romano	UD	12	Nov 12, 1988	Indoor Gymnasium, Chongju, South Korea	Retained WBC and The Ring flyweight titles
17	Win	17–0	Sot Chitalada	UD	12	Jul 24, 1988	Pohang Indoor Gymnasium, Pohang, South Korea	Won WBC and The Ring flyweight titles
16	Win	16–0	Sonny Vidal	PTS	12	Feb 20, 1988	Gimpo, South Korea	Retained OPBF light-flyweight title
15	Win	15–0	Putt Ohyuthanakorn	KO	10 (12)	Dec 11, 1987	Jonghab Gymnasium, Gwangju City, South Korea	Won vacant OPBF light-flyweight title
14	Win	14–0	Jorge Cano	PTS	10	Jul 12, 1987	Bucheon, South Korea	
13	Win	13–0	William Belan	KO	1 (10)	May 30, 1987	Osan, South Korea	
12	Win	12–0	Sung Kyu Kim	PTS	8	Mar 8, 1987	Chamsil Gymnasium, Seoul, South Korea	
11	Win	11–0	Ha Shik Lim	PTS	10	Jan 17, 1987	Hongcheon, South Korea	Won South Korea light-flyweight title
10	Win	10–0	Han Bong Kang	KO	7 (8)	Oct 17, 1986	Suwon, South Korea	
9	Win	9–0	Eul Chul Jung	PTS	8	Jul 26, 1986	Osan, South Korea	
8	Win	8–0	Soo-Young Lee	KO	2 (6)	Jun 28, 1986	Girls' Commercial School, Gunsan, South Korea	
7	Win	7–0	Sung Kyu Kim	PTS	8	Apr 12, 1986	Yeongcheon, South Korea	
6	Win	6–0	Kye Yoon Jung	PTS	6	Nov 23, 1985	Incheon, South Korea	
5	Win	5–0	No-Hyun Hwang	KO	2 (4)	Oct 19, 1985	Nonsan, South Korea	
4	Win	4–0	Hyung-Man Lee	PTS	4	Aug 17, 1985	Bucheon, South Korea	
3	Win	3–0	YoungSuk Ahn	KO	4 (4)	Jun 29, 1985	Munhwa Gymnasium, Seoul, South Korea	
2	Win	2–0	Joon-Won Kang	PTS	4	Jun 1, 1985	Incheon, South Korea	
1	Win	1–0	Byung Sik Bae	KO	4 (4)	Apr 6, 1985	Daegu, South Korea	

== See also ==
- List of Korean boxers
- Lineal championship
- List of world flyweight boxing champions

Sporting positions
World boxing titles
Preceded by Sot Chitalada	WBC flyweight champion July 24, 1988 – June 3, 1989	Succeeded by Sot Chitalada
Preceded by Sot Chitalada	The Ring flyweight champion July 24, 1988 – 1989; Title terminated	Vacant Title next held by Pongsaklek Wonjongkam; Title reintroduced
Preceded by Elvis Álvarez	WBA flyweight champion June 1, 1991 – September 26, 1992	Succeeded by Aquiles Guzmán
