= Aquiles Guzmán =

Venezuelan boxer

Personal information
- Nickname: El Tanquecito (The Little Tank)
- Nationality: (Venezuela) Venezuelan
- Born: Aquiles José Guzmán Matute; April 13, 1965 (age 61) El tigre,Anzoátegui, Venezuela
- Weight: Flyweight; Super flyweight

Boxing career

Boxing record
- Total fights: 31
- Wins: 14
- Win by KO: 8
- Losses: 14
- Draws: 3
- No contests: 0

Aquiles José Guzmán Matute. (born April 13, 1965) is a former Venezuelan professional boxer. He is a former World Boxing Association (WBA) flyweight (112 lb) champion.

== Professional career ==
Guzmán turned professional in 1985. His second opponent as a professional boxer, Gregorio Padrino, died two days after their bout as a consequence of the blows received in it. Guzman continued on and captured the WBA flyweight title in 1992 with an upset decision win over Yong-Kang Kim. He lost the belt in his first defense to David Grimán by decision (scoring of judges) in 1994. He later challenged Saen Sor Ploenchit, Alimi Goitia, and Yokthai Sithoar for their respective belts but lost each fight. He is one of only 2 world champions in history to retire with an even record, the other being Juan Polo Perez. Some sources report his record as 13-14-3 which would make him 1 of only 3 world champions to retire with a losing record along with Jimmy Reagan and Francisco Quiroz.

== Professional boxing record ==
31 fights	14 wins	14 losses
By knockout	8	4
By decision	6	10
Draws	3	

No.	Result	Record	Opponent	Type	Round, time	Date	Location	Notes
31	Loss	14–14–3	Edison Torres	TKO	4	9 Sep 2001	Maracay, Aragua, Venezuela	
30	Win	14–13–3	Presley Sandoval	TKO	5	5 May 2001	Turmero, Aragua, Venezuela	
29	Loss	13–13–3	Rafael Márquez	RTD	6 (12), 3:00	16 Dec 2000	Fórum Bicentenario, Maracay, Venezuela	For vacant WBA Fedelatin bantamweight title
28	Loss	13–12–3	Gilberto González	TKO	6 (12)	27 Sep 1997	Gimnasio José Beracasa, Caracas, Venezuela	For WBA Fedelatin flyweight title
27	Loss	13–11–3	Yokthai Sithoar	UD	12	1 Mar 1997	Chachoengsao Stadium, Chachoengsao, Thailand	For WBA super flyweight title
26	Win	13–10–3	Leo Gámez	PTS	12	7 Oct 1996	Maracay, Aragua, Venezuela	Won vacant WBA Fedelatin flyweight title
25	Loss	12–10–3	Adonis Cruz	PTS	10	30 Mar 1996	Estadio Nacional, Managua, Nicaragua	
24	Loss	12–9–3	Alimi Goitia	TKO	5 (12), 2:48	25 Nov 1995	Marina Bay Hotel, Porlamar, Venezuela	For WBA super flyweight title
23	Win	12–8–3	Rafael Castro	TKO	8	26 Aug 1995	Cartagena, Bolívar Department, Colombia	
22	Loss	11–8–3	Leo Gámez	PTS	12	20 May 1995	La Asunción, Nueva Esparta, Venezuela	For vacant WBA Fedelatin flyweight title
21	Win	11–7–3	Rafael Castro	PTS	10	22 Apr 1995	Maiquetía, Vargas, Venezuela	
20	Win	10–7–3	Saúl Guaza	PTS	10	6 Aug 1994	Maracay, Aragua, Venezuela	
19	Loss	9–7–3	Saen Sor Ploenchit	MD	12	12 Jun 1994	Watthana Nakhon, Sa Kaeo, Thailand	For WBA flyweight title
18	Wim	9–6–3	Róbinson Quiróz	TKO	6	24 Jul 1993	El Tigre, Anzoátegui, Venezuela	
17	Win	8–6–3	Sixto Jaramillo	TKO	7	25 May 1993	Caracas, Venezuela	
16	Loss	7–6–3	David Grimán	UD	12	15 Dec 1992	Gimnasio José Beracasa, Caracas, Venezuela	Lost WBA flyweight title
15	Win	7–5–3	Kim Yong-kang	UD	12	26 Sep 1992	Pohang Gymnasium, Pohang, South Korea	Won WBA flyweight title
14	Win	6–5–3	Iván Morales	TKO	10 (12)	29 Feb 1992	Turmero, Aragua, Venezuela	Won inaugural WBA Fedelatin flyweight title
13	Win	5–5–3	José G. Castillo	TKO	3	21 Dec 1991	Caracas, Venezuela	
12	Win	4–5–3	Edison Torres	TKO	6 (12)	27 Sep 1991	Rosario, Zulia, Venezuela	Won Venezuelan flyweight title
11	Win	3–5–3	Orlando Maestre	TKO	6	23 Aug 1991	Petare, Miranda, Venezuela	
10	Loss	2–5–3	Domingo Sosa	PTS	10	19 Dec 1989	Willemstad, Curaçao	
9	Draw	2–4–3	Juan Blanco	PTS	6	10 Oct 1987	Turmero, Aragua, Venezuela	
8	Win	2–4–2	Carlos Pérez	PTS	6	18 Jul 1987	Puerto Cabello, Carabobo, Venezuela	
7	Draw	1–4–2	Juan Blanco	PTS	6	23 Jun 1987	Turmero, Aragua, Venezuela	
6	Loss	1–4–1	Carlos Alberto Rodríguez	PTS	6	21 Mar 1987	Palo Verde, Sucre, Venezuela	
5	Loss	1–3–1	Luis Malave	PTS	4	15 Dec 1986	Carrizal, Miranda, Venezuela	
4	Loss	1–2–1	Jesús Rojas	PTS	6	22 Sep 1986	Maracay, Aragua, Venezuela	
3	Loss	1–1–1	Victoriano Hernández	PTS	6	19 May 1986	Maracaibo, Zulia, Venezuela	
2	Win	1–0–1	Gregorio Padrino	UD	4	21 Mar 1986	Ciudad Ojeda, Zulia, Venezuela	
1	Draw	0–0–1	José G. Castillo	PTS	4	17 Jul 1985	Maracay, Aragua, Venezuela	

== See also ==
- List of flyweight boxing champions
- List of Venezuelans

Achievements
Preceded by Kim Yong-kang	WBA flyweight champion September 26, 1992 - December 15, 1992	Succeeded by David Grimán
