= Leo Gámez =

Venezuelan boxer (born 1963)

Personal information
- Nickname: Torito ("Little Bull")
- Born: Silvio Rafael Gámez; August 8, 1963 (age 62) San Juan de Los Morros, Venezuela
- Height: 5 ft (152 cm)
- Weight: Mini flyweight; Light flyweight; Flyweight; Super flyweight

Boxing career
- Reach: 63 1/2 in (161 cm)
- Stance: Orthodox

Boxing record
- Total fights: 48
- Wins: 35
- Win by KO: 26
- Losses: 12
- Draws: 1

Silvio Rafael Gámez (born August 8, 1963), better known as Leo Gámez, is a Venezuelan former professional boxer who competed from 1985 to 2005. He is the first boxer in history to win world titles in the four lightest weight divisions, having held the World Boxing Association (WBA) minimumweight title from 1989 to 1990, the WBA light flyweight title from 1993 to 1995, the WBA flyweight title in 1999, and the WBA super flyweight title from 2000 to 2001.

Gámez is considered by some boxing critics to be among Venezuela's best fighters since the Betulio González era.

== Debut/The 1980s ==
He made his professional boxing debut on February 14, 1985, in Maracay, when he decisioned Francisco García over four rounds. On April 17 of that same year, he got his second victory, another four round points win, this time over Alcides Hernandez, also in Maracay. After those two wins, Gámez had six consecutive knockout wins, including two over Rafael Lara, and one in his first fight outside Maracay, held on August 14 at El Guayabo, where he beat Jose Escorcia in the fourth round. On November 28 of 1986, he would beat Escorcia's brother, Alberto, also by knockout in four rounds, at Maracaibo.

On February 2, 1987, he suffered his first "blemish", when he was held to a two-round technical draw by Rafael Bolivar, at Maracay. By then, Gámez was becoming a well known boxer among Hispanic boxing fans, Guantes magazine mentioning him sporadically on their articles.

On April 30, Gámez received his first shot at a title, when he was faced with Pedro Nieves in the Venezuelan town of Turnero, for the national Jr. Flyweight title. Gámez won the championship with a second-round knockout.

He defended the title one time and won a handful of non-title bouts before reducing weight in order to get his first world championship opportunity.

On January 10, 1988, Gámez fought for the WBA's vacant world Minimumweight championship against Bong-Jun Kim. In what also was his first fight abroad, Gámez became world champion for the first time when he outpointed Kim over 12 rounds in South Korea. After that victory, he became a celebrity both in Venezuela and internationally, as he went from being mentioned in articles, as aforementioned, to having articles written about him on magazines that specialized in boxing.

He had several managerial problems after winning his first world championship, however, and he was able to defend that title only one time, knocking out Kenji Yokozawa in three rounds at Japan. When he suffered a broken arm not too long after, he decided to vacate the title, and took an extended lay-off from boxing.

On October 29, 1989, Gámez was finally able to make a comeback, and he knocked out Victoriano Hernandez in five rounds that night. After one more win, he attempted, for the first time, to win the WBA's world Jr. Flyweight championship. On April 29, 1990, he was faced with long reigning world champion Myung-Woo Yuh, once again, in South Korea. Gámez lost a controversial twelve-round decision; many fans and observers thought he deserved the win, and the WBA ordered an immediate rematch. On November 10 of that year, he would again fight Woo Yuh in South Korea, and, once again, Woo Yuh won by a twelve-round decision to retain the world title.

== The 1990s ==
Disillusioned, Gámez took off almost one more year off boxing. But he returned, inspired with the idea of winning the WBA's world Flyweight championship. Having been promised a title try by the WBA, he began training and, after his training was complete, he returned to South Korea, where he challenged WBA world Flyweight champion Yong-Kang Kim on November 5, 1991. Gámez once again lost by a twelve-round decision, but he decided to stay active in boxing after that loss.

Gámez won four fights in a row before once again dropping weight in order to challenge for a world title. His third try at the WBA's world Jr. Flyweight title, which was vacant after Woo Yuh's retirement, came on November 21, 1993, against Shiro Yashiro, in Tokyo. Gámez finally won the world Jr. Flyweight title, his second world championship, by knocking Yashiro out in nine rounds. He defended the title successfully three times, with fights in Panama and Thailand (twice), before losing it to Hi-Yong Choi on February 4 of 1995, once again in Korea. On May 20 of that year, he won the regional WBA Fedelatin Flyweight title by defeating Aquiles Guzmán by a twelve-round decision in Paraguay.

Gámez's first opportunity at joining the elite group of fighters who have won world championships in three different divisions, and his second attempt at becoming world Flyweight champion, came on March 24, 1996, against world champion Saen Sor Ploenchit in Thailand. Gámez failed that time, however, dropping a twelve-round split decision to the champion. Then, he lost the Fedelatin title in a rematch with Guzmán, held on October 7 at Maracay. Guzmán outpointed him over twelve rounds as well.

Gámez became, once again, disillusioned with boxing. In 1998, however, he returned to the sport, knocking out Gilberto González on November 3 in eight rounds in Venezuela, to regain the Fedelatin title.

Gámez joined the exclusive group of champions to win titles in three or more divisions, at the same time becoming the first one among those to be world Flyweight champion, when he knocked out defending WBA world Flyweight champion Hugo Rafael Soto in the third round on March 13, 1999. The fight, held at New York's Madison Square Garden, also marked Gámez's debut as a professional fighter in the United States. After this win, Gámez received a hero's welcome at Caracas' Simón Bolívar International Airport.

== The 2000s ==
On May 29, he won the WBA's "interim" world Super Flyweight championship by knocking out former WBO world Jr. Flyweight champion Josué Camacho in the fifth round at the Roberto Clemente Coliseum in San Juan, Puerto Rico. He was not generally considered to be a four division world champion, however, because the WBA had conditioned their recognition of him as world Super Flyweight champion on either one of two things happening: the real champion, Hideki Todaka, would have to decide to leave his place as champion or Gámez would have to beat him in a fight in order to be recognized as champion. After losing the Flyweight crown on September 3 to Sornpichai Kratingdaengym by knockout in eight rounds at a Thai hotel, Gámez received an opportunity to solidify his status as WBA world Super Flyweight champion, when the official champion, Todaka, gave him a shot on October 9, 2000.

Gámez made history once again, joining the small group of boxers who have won world titles in four different divisions, first quadruple same organization world champions (all WBA four champions) and becoming both the first one among those to have held the world Flyweight title and the first Venezuelan in that group, when he knocked Todaka out in seven rounds at Nagoya. On his first defense, held on March 11, 2001, in Yokohama, Japan, he lost the crown by a ten-round Technical knockout to Celes Kobayashi.

After one more win, Gámez attempted to join the very exclusive group of fighters to win world titles in five different divisions, when he lost to WBA world Bantamweight champion Johnny Bredahl by a twelve-round decision, on November 8, 2002, in Copenhagen, Denmark.

Gámez, as of 2014, is currently training young boxers in San Juan de los Morros in the Guarico state, and many other cities in Venezuela.

== Retirement ==
After losing to Prakorb Udomna of Thailand, Gámez decided to retire for good from boxing, leaving with a record of 35 wins, 12 losses and 1 draw, 26 of his wins coming by knockout. His last fight was held in Thailand.

== Professional boxing record ==
48 fights	35 wins	12 losses
By knockout	26	2
By decision	9	10
Draws	1	

No.	Result	Record	Opponent	Type	Round, time	Date	Location	Notes
48	Loss	35–12–1	Prakorb Udomna	UD	12	Dec 22, 2005	Rajadamnern Stadium, Bangkok, Thailand	For WBA interim bantamweight title
47	Win	35–11–1	Dioberto Julio	TKO	6 (10)	Aug 13, 2005	Circulo Militar, Maracay, Venezuela	
46	Loss	34–11–1	Volodymyr Sydorenko	UD	12	Oct 26, 2004	Lånlet Arena, Rostock, Germany	
45	Loss	34–10–1	Hideki Todaka	SD	12	Oct 4, 2003	Ryōgoku Kokugikan, Tokyo, Japan	For WBA interim bantamweight title
44	Loss	34–9–1	Johnny Bredahl	UD	12	Nov 8, 2002	Falkoner Center, Frederiksberg, Denmark	For WBA bantamweight title
43	Win	34–8–1	Fidel Romero	UD	10	Apr 27, 2002	Centro Recreacional Yesterday, Turmero, Venezuela	
42	Loss	33–8–1	Celes Kobayashi	TKO	10 (12), 2:29	Mar 11, 2001	Yokohama Arena, Yokohama, Japan	Lost WBA super flyweight title
41	Win	33–7–1	Hideki Todaka	KO	7 (12), 2:13	Oct 9, 2000	Aichi Prefectural Gym, Nagoya, Japan	Won WBA super flyweight title
40	Loss	32–7–1	Sornpichai Kratingdaenggym	KO	9 (12), 2:52	Sep 3, 1999	Mukdahan Grand Hotel Arena, Mukdahan, Thailand	Lost WBA flyweight title
39	Win	32–6–1	Josué Camacho	TKO	8 (12), 2:06	May 29, 1999	Coliseo Roberto Clemente, San Juan, Puerto Rico	Won WBA interim super flyweight title
38	Win	31–6–1	Hugo Rafael Soto	KO	3 (12), 0:33	Mar 13, 1999	Madison Square Garden, New York, United States	Won WBA flyweight title
37	Win	30–6–1	Gilberto González	KO	8 (12)	Oct 3, 1998	Caracas, Venezuela	Won WBA Fedelatin flyweight title
36	Loss	29–6–1	Aquiles Guzmán	PTS	12	Oct 7, 1996	Maracay, Venezuela	For WBA Fedelatin flyweight title
35	Loss	29–5–1	Somchai Chertchai	SD	12	Mar 24, 1996	Zeer Shopping Center, Rangsit, Thailand	For WBA flyweight title
34	Win	29–4–1	Alvaro Mercado	TKO	4 (12)	Sep 18, 1995	Maracay, Venezuela	Retained WBA Fedelatin flyweight title
33	Win	28–4–1	Aquiles Guzmán	PTS	12	May 20, 1995	La Asuncion, Venezuela	Won WBA Fedelatin flyweight title
32	Loss	27–4–1	Choi Hi-Yong	UD	12	Feb 4, 1995	Industrial Gymnasium, Ulsan, South Korea	Lost WBA light flyweight title
31	Win	27–3–1	Pichit Chor Siriwat	TKO	6 (10), 2:00	Oct 9, 1994	Ramkhamhaeng University, Bangkok, Thailand	Retained WBA light flyweight title
30	Draw	26–3–1	Kaaj Chartbandit	SD	12	Jun 27, 1994	Rajadamnern Stadium, Bangkok, Thailand	Retained WBA light flyweight title
29	Win	26–3	Juan Antonio Torres	TKO	7 (12), 1:18	Feb 5, 1994	Gimnasio Nuevo Panama, Panama City, Panama	Retained WBA light flyweight title
28	Win	25–3	Shiro Yahiro	TKO	9 (12), 2:20	Oct 21, 1993	Korakuen Hall, Tokyo, Japan	Won vacant WBA light flyweight title
27	Win	24–3	Oswaldo Osorio	KO	2 (?)	Jul 11, 1993	Caracas, Venezuela	
26	Win	23–3	Carlos Alberto Rodriguez	PTS	10	Dec 19, 1992	Turmero, Venezuela	
25	Win	22–3	Benedicto Murillo	TKO	6 (?)	Jun 12, 1992	Turmero, Venezuela	
24	Win	21–3	Rafael Julio	KO	4 (?)	May 9, 1992	Turmero, Venezuela	
23	Loss	20–3	Kim Yong-kang	UD	12	Oct 5, 1991	Incheon Gymnasium, Incheon, South Korea	For WBA flyweight title
22	Loss	20–2	Yuh Myung-Woo	UD	12	Nov 10, 1990	Pohang Indoor Gymnasium, Seoul, South Korea	For WBA light flyweight title
21	Loss	20–1	Yuh Myung-Woo	SD	12	Apr 29, 1990	Intercontinental Hotel, Seoul, South Korea	For WBA light flyweight title
20	Win	20–0	Mauricio Bernal	TKO	7 (?)	Dec 15, 1989	Turmero, Venezuela	
19	Win	19–0	Victoriano Hernandez	KO	5 (?)	Oct 29, 1989	Turmero, Venezuela	
18	Win	18–0	Kenji Yokozawa	TKO	3 (12), 1:25	Apr 24, 1988	Korakuen Hall, Tokyo, Japan	Retained WBA minimumweight title
17	Win	17–0	Kim Bong-Jun	UD	12	Jan 10, 1988	Kudok Gymnasium, Busan, South Korea	Won inaugural WBA minimumweight title
16	Win	16–0	Victoriano Hernandez	PTS	10	Oct 10, 1987	Turmero, Venezuela	
15	Win	15–0	Alfredo Reyes	TKO	2 (12)	Aug 22, 1987	Turmero, Venezuela	Retained Venezuelan light flyweight title
14	Win	14–0	Leonardo Paredes	TKO	4 (?)	Jun 23, 1987	Maracay, Venezuela	
13	Win	13–0	Pedro Nieves	KO	2 (?)	Apr 30, 1987	Turmero, Venezuela	Won Venezuelan light flyweight title
12	Win	12–0	Jose G Castillo	TKO	5 (?)	Mar 21, 1987	Maracay, Venezuela	
11	Win	11–0	Rafael Bolivar	TD	2 (?)	Feb 2, 1987	Maracay, Venezuela	
10	Win	10–0	Alberto Escorcia	KO	4 (?)	Nov 28, 1986	Maracaibo, Venezuela	
9	Win	9–0	Jose G Castillo	PTS	8	Oct 31, 1986	Valle de la Pascua, Venezuela	
8	Win	8–0	Rafael Lara	KO	3 (?)	Sep 30, 1986	Maracay, Venezuela	
7	Win	7–0	Fidel Gonzalez	KO	5 (?)	Jul 26, 1986	Maracay, Venezuela	
6	Win	6–0	Rafael Lara	KO	6 (?)	Apr 19, 1986	Maracay, Venezuela	
5	Win	5–0	Alberto Pimienta	KO	6 (?)	Nov 5, 1985	Maracaibo, Venezuela	
4	Win	4–0	Jose Escorcia	KO	3 (?)	Aug 14, 1985	El Guayabo, Zulia, Venezuela	
3	Win	3–0	Jose G Castillo	KO	5 (?)	Jun 11, 1985	Maracay, Venezuela	
2	Win	2–0	Alcides Hernandez	PTS	4	Apr 17, 1985	Maracay, Venezuela	
1	Win	1–0	Francisco Garcia	PTS	4	Feb 14, 1985	Maracay, Venezuela	

== Titles in boxing ==
=== Major world titles ===
- WBA minimumweight champion (Note: Won the inaugural title on January 10, 1988) (105 lbs)
- WBA light flyweight champion (108 lbs)
- WBA flyweight champion (112 lbs)
- WBA super flyweight champion (115 lbs)

=== Interim world titles ===
- WBA interim super flyweight champion (115 lbs)

=== Regional/International titles ===
- Venezuelan light flyweight champion (108 lbs)
- WBA Fedelatin flyweight champion (112 lbs) (2×)

== See also ==
- List of boxing quadruple champions
- List of minimumweight boxing champions
- List of light-flyweight boxing champions
- List of flyweight boxing champions
- List of super-flyweight boxing champions

== Notes ==
Sporting positions
World boxing titles
Inaugural Champion	WBA minimumweight champion January 10, 1988 – April 1, 1989; Vacated	Vacant Title next held by Kim Bong-jun
Vacant Title last held by Yuh Myung-woo	WBA light flyweight champion October 21, 1993 – February 4, 1995	Succeeded by Choi Hi-yong
Preceded by Hugo Rafael Soto	WBA flyweight champion March 13, 1999 – September 3, 1999	Succeeded by Sornpichai Kratingdaenggym
New title	WBA super flyweight champion Interim title May 29, 1999 – October 9, 2000; Won full title	Vacant Title next held by Rafael Concepción
Preceded by Hideki Todaka	WBA super flyweight champion October 9, 2000 - March 11, 2001	Succeeded by Celes Kobayashi
