= List of Korean boxers =

This is a partial list of Korean boxers.

- Yuh Myung-woo, 2-time WBA light flyweight boxing champion with a record of 38 wins and only 1 loss
- Kim Ji-won (boxer), unbeaten world champion. He is one of just fifteen world boxing champions to retire without a loss
- Baik Hyun-man, Heavyweight boxer who won the silver medal in Olympics in 1988
- Chang Jung-koo, former light flyweight boxing champion
- Chi In-jin, WBC featherweight champion 2004
- Park Chong-pal, South Korean former professional boxer who held the IBF, WBA and lineal titles at super-middleweight.
- Baek In-chul, Super middleweight division who held the World Boxing Association and Lineal super middleweight championship.
- Park Yong-kyun, WBA and Lineal Featherweight Champion
- Masamori Tokuyama (Hong Chang-soo), former WBC and lineal super flyweight champion
- Kim Duk-koo, South Korean boxer who died after his last fight
- Kim Song-guk, 2004 Summer Olympics and won the silver medal
- Kim Un-chol, 2000 Summer Olympics and won the bronze medal
- Kim Ki-soo, the first South Korean world champion
- Kim Yong-kang, WBC and Lineal Flyweight Champion
- Hong Soo-hwan, captured the Lineal and WBA bantamweight title
- Yum Dong-kyun, former Lineal and WBC junior featherweight champion.
- Yuh Hwan-kil, inaugural IBF Super Featherweight champion
- Kim Won-il (boxer), won the gold medal in the men's bantamweight division at the Asian Games 2002. Defeating Abdusalom Khasanov and Bekzod Khidirov in the final.
- Lee Kyu-hwan, aka Keikan Ri, lost to the eventual gold medalist in the 1936 Olympics, and was part of the All-Japan team that beat the San Jose State University boxing team in 1939.
