= David Grimán =

Venezuelan boxer (born 1967)

Personal information
- Nationality: (Venezuela) Venezuelan
- Born: David Grimán Méndez; March 10, 1967 (age 59) Los Teques, Venezuela
- Weight: Flyweight; Super flyweight

Boxing career
- Stance: Orthodox

Boxing record
- Total fights: 27
- Wins: 22
- Win by KO: 14
- Losses: 5
- Draws: 0
- No contests: 0
Medal record
Representing Venezuela
Goodwill Games
Bronze medal – third place	1986 Moscow	Flyweight
World Amateur Championships
Silver medal – second place	1986 Reno	Flyweight
Pan American Games
Silver medal – second place	1987 Indianapolis	Flyweight

David Grimán (born March 10, 1967, in Los Teques) is a former Venezuelan professional boxer. He is a former World Boxing Association (WBA) flyweight (112 lb) champion.

== Amateur highlights ==
- 1986 — Bronze Medalist at the Goodwill Games in the Men's Flyweight
  - Defeated Joe Lawlor (Ireland) 5:0
  - Defeated Lernik Papyan (Soviet Union) 4:1
  - Lost to Arthur Johnson (United States) 2:3
- 1986 — Silver Medalist at the World Championships in Reno, United States in the Men's Flyweight
  - Defeated Jean Severino (France), 5:0
  - Defeated Wolfgang Kamm (West Germany), 5:0
  - Defeated Eyüp Can (Turkey), 3:2
  - Lost to Pedro Orlando Reyes (Cuba), 0:5
- 1987 — Silver Medalist at the Pan American Games in the Men's Flyweight
  - Defeated Luis Ramírez (Dominican Republic), 5:0
  - Defeated Luis Vargas (Panama), 5:0
  - Defeated Rafael Ramos (Puerto Rico), 5:0
  - Lost to Adalberto Regalado (Cuba), 0:5
- 1988 — Represented Venezuela at the Olympic Games in the Men's Flyweight
  - Lost to Serafim Todorov (Bulgaria) points

== Professional career ==
Grimán turned professional in 1989 and captured the WBA flyweight title in 1992 with a decision win over Aquiles Guzmán. He defended it twice before losing to Saen Sor Ploenchit by Unanimous decision in 1994.

== See also ==
- List of flyweight boxing champions
- List of Venezuelans

Achievements
Preceded by Aquiles Guzman	WBA flyweight champion December 15, 1992 – February 13, 1994	Succeeded by Saen Sor Ploenchit
