= José Bonilla (boxer) =

Venezuelan boxer

José Bonilla (El Tigre, Anzoátegui, 19 November 1967 – 14 June 2002) was a Venezuelan professional boxer. He was a former World Boxing Association (WBA) flyweight (112 lb) champion.

== Professional career ==
Bonilla turned professional in 1990 and captured the WBA flyweight title in 1996 with a decision win over Saen Sor Ploenchit. He defended it three times before losing to Hugo Rafael Soto by split decision in 1998.

== Death ==
Bonilla died after an asthma attack on 14 June 2002.

Sporting positions
Preceded by Saen Sor Ploenchit	WBA Flyweight Champion; 24 Nov 1996 – 29 May 1998	Succeeded by Hugo Rafael Soto
Status
Previous: José Ruíz Matos	Latest born world champion to die 14–24 June 2002	Next: Pedro Alcázar

== See also ==
- List of WBA world champions
- List of Venezuelans
