= List of The Ring pound for pound rankings (2020s) =

Boxing magazine The Ring began naming the top 10 pound for pound boxers in 1989. The first #1 pound for pound fighter was heavyweight champion Mike Tyson. To reduce the number of tables, a table is only added if there are changes in the rankings. For WBA titles, only titles in the primary champion lineage are listed.

== 2026 ==
October 29, 2026
Changes	Rank	Boxer	Record	Weight class	Title(s)
—N/a	1	Naoya Inoue	33–0 (27 KO)	Super bantamweight	WBA (Super), WBC, IBF, WBO, and The Ring
—N/a	2	Oleksandr Usyk	25–0 (17 KO)	Heavyweight	The Ring
—N/a	3	Shakur Stevenson	25–0 (11 KO)	Light welterweight	WBO and The Ring
—N/a	4	Jesse Rodriguez	24–0 (17 KO)	Bantamweight	WBA (Super)
—N/a	5	David Benavidez	32–0 (26 KO)	Cruiserweight	WBA (Super) and WBO
—N/a	6	Dmitry Bivol	25–1 (12 KO)	Light heavyweight	WBA (Super), IBF, WBO, and The Ring
—N/a	7	Junto Nakatani	32–1 (24 KO)	Super bantamweight	—N/a
—N/a	8	Devin Haney	33–0–0–1 (15 KO)	Welterweight	WBO
—N/a	9	Jaron Ennis	36–0–0–1 (32 KO)	Light middleweight	WBA and WBO
New	10	O'Shaquie Foster	26–3 (12 KO)	Super featherweight	WBC, IBF, WBO, and The Ring

June 29, 2026
Changes	Rank	Boxer	Record	Weight class	Title(s)
—N/a	1	Naoya Inoue	33–0 (27 KO)	Super bantamweight	WBA (Super), WBC, IBF, WBO, and The Ring
—N/a	2	Oleksandr Usyk	25–0 (17 KO)	Heavyweight	The Ring
—N/a	3	Shakur Stevenson	25–0 (11 KO)	Light welterweight	WBO and The Ring
—N/a	4	Jesse Rodriguez	24–0 (17 KO)	Bantamweight	WBA
—N/a	5	David Benavidez	32–0 (26 KO)	Light heavyweight Cruiserweight	WBC WBA (Super) and WBO
—N/a	6	Dmitry Bivol	25–1 (12 KO)	Light heavyweight	WBA (Super), IBF, WBO, and The Ring
—N/a	7	Junto Nakatani	32–1 (24 KO)	Super bantamweight	—N/a
—N/a	8	Devin Haney	33–0–0–1 (15 KO)	Welterweight	WBO
New	9	Jaron Ennis	36–0–0–1 (32 KO)	Light middleweight	WBA and WBO
-1	10	Oscar Collazo	15–0 (12 KO)	Mini flyweight	WBA (Super), WBO, and The Ring

May 4, 2026
Changes	Rank	Boxer	Record	Weight class	Title(s)
+1	1	Naoya Inoue	33–0 (27 KO)	Super bantamweight	WBA (Super), WBC, IBF, WBO, and The Ring
-1	2	Oleksandr Usyk	24–0 (15 KO)	Heavyweight	WBA (Super), WBC, IBF, and The Ring
—N/a	3	Shakur Stevenson	25–0 (11 KO)	Light welterweight	WBO and The Ring
—N/a	4	Jesse Rodriguez	23–0 (16 KO)	Super flyweight	WBA, WBC, WBO, and The Ring
+2	5	David Benavidez	32–0 (26 KO)	Light heavyweight Cruiserweight	WBC WBA (Super) and WBO
-1	6	Dmitry Bivol	24–1 (12 KO)	Light heavyweight	WBA (Super), IBF, WBO, and The Ring
-1	7	Junto Nakatani	32–1 (24 KO)	Super bantamweight	—N/a
—N/a	8	Devin Haney	33–0–0–1 (15 KO)	Welterweight	WBO
—N/a	9	Oscar Collazo	14–0 (11 KO)	Mini flyweight	WBA (Super), WBO, and The Ring
—N/a	10	Emanuel Navarrete	40–2–1 (33 KO)	Super featherweight	IBF and WBO

April 20, 2026
Changes	Rank	Boxer	Record	Weight class	Title(s)
—N/a	1	Oleksandr Usyk	24–0 (15 KO)	Heavyweight	WBA (Super), WBC, IBF, and The Ring
—N/a	2	Naoya Inoue	32–0 (27 KO)	Super bantamweight	WBA (Super), WBC, IBF, WBO, and The Ring
—N/a	3	Shakur Stevenson	25–0 (11 KO)	Light welterweight	WBO and The Ring
—N/a	4	Jesse Rodriguez	23–0 (16 KO)	Super flyweight	WBA, WBC, WBO, and The Ring
—N/a	5	Dmitry Bivol	24–1 (12 KO)	Light heavyweight	WBA (Super), IBF, WBO, and The Ring
+1	6	Junto Nakatani	32–0 (24 KO)	Super bantamweight	—N/a
+1	7	David Benavidez	31–0 (25 KO)	Light heavyweight	WBC
+1	8	Devin Haney	33–0–0–1 (15 KO)	Welterweight	WBO
+1	9	Oscar Collazo	14–0 (11 KO)	Mini flyweight	WBA (Super), WBO, and The Ring
New	10	Emanuel Navarrete	40–2–1 (33 KO)	Super featherweight	IBF and WBO

February 9, 2026
Changes	Rank	Boxer	Record	Weight class	Title(s)
—N/a	1	Oleksandr Usyk	24–0 (15 KO)	Heavyweight	WBA (Super), WBC, IBF, and The Ring
—N/a	2	Naoya Inoue	32–0 (27 KO)	Super bantamweight	WBA (Super), WBC, IBF, WBO, and The Ring
+4	3	Shakur Stevenson	25–0 (11 KO)	Light welterweight	WBO and The Ring
-1	4	Jesse Rodriguez	23–0 (16 KO)	Super flyweight	WBA, WBC, WBO, and The Ring
-1	5	Dmitry Bivol	24–1 (12 KO)	Light heavyweight	WBA (Super), IBF, WBO, and The Ring
-1	6	Artur Beterbiev	21–1 (20 KO)	Light heavyweight	—N/a
-1	7	Junto Nakatani	32–0 (24 KO)	Super bantamweight	—N/a
—N/a	8	David Benavidez	31–0 (25 KO)	Light heavyweight	WBC
—N/a	9	Devin Haney	33–0–0–1 (15 KO)	Welterweight	WBO
—N/a	10	Oscar Collazo	13–0 (10 KO)	Mini flyweight	WBA (Super), WBO, and The Ring

== 2025 ==
December 24, 2025
Changes	Rank	Boxer	Record	Weight class	Title(s)
+1	1	Oleksandr Usyk	24–0 (15 KO)	Heavyweight	WBA (Super), WBC, IBF, and The Ring
+1	2	Naoya Inoue	31–0 (27 KO)	Super bantamweight	WBA (Super), WBC, IBF, WBO, and The Ring
+1	3	Jesse Rodriguez	23–0 (16 KO)	Super flyweight	WBA, WBC, WBO, and The Ring
+1	4	Dmitry Bivol	24–1 (12 KO)	Light heavyweight	WBA (Super), IBF, WBO, and The Ring
+1	5	Artur Beterbiev	21–1 (20 KO)	Light heavyweight	—N/a
+1	6	Junto Nakatani	31–0 (24 KO)	Bantamweight	—N/a
+1	7	Shakur Stevenson	24–0 (11 KO)	Lightweight	WBC
+1	8	David Benavidez	31–0 (25 KO)	Light heavyweight	WBC
+1	9	Devin Haney	33–0–0–1 (15 KO)	Welterweight	WBO
New	10	Oscar Collazo	13–0 (10 KO)	Mini flyweight	WBA (Super), WBO, and The Ring

November 24, 2025
Changes	Rank	Boxer	Record	Weight class	Title(s)
—N/a	1	Terence Crawford	42–0 (31 KO)	Super middleweight	WBA (Super), WBC, IBF, WBO, and The Ring
—N/a	2	Oleksandr Usyk	24–0 (15 KO)	Heavyweight	WBA (Super), WBC, IBF, and The Ring
—N/a	3	Naoya Inoue	31–0 (27 KO)	Super bantamweight	WBA (Super), WBC, IBF, WBO, and The Ring
+2	4	Jesse Rodriguez	23–0 (16 KO)	Super flyweight	WBA, WBC, WBO, and The Ring
-1	5	Dmitry Bivol	24–1 (12 KO)	Light heavyweight	WBA (Super), IBF, WBO, and The Ring
-1	6	Artur Beterbiev	21–1 (20 KO)	Light heavyweight	—N/a
—N/a	7	Junto Nakatani	31–0 (24 KO)	Bantamweight	—N/a
—N/a	8	Shakur Stevenson	24–0 (11 KO)	Lightweight	WBC
—N/a	9	David Benavidez	31–0 (25 KO)	Light heavyweight	WBC
New	10	Devin Haney	33–0–0–1 (15 KO)	Welterweight	WBO

September 15, 2025
Changes	Rank	Boxer	Record	Weight class	Title(s)
+2	1	Terence Crawford	42–0 (31 KO)	Super middleweight	WBA (Super), WBC, IBF, WBO, and The Ring
-1	2	Oleksandr Usyk	24–0 (15 KO)	Heavyweight	WBA (Super), WBC, IBF, WBO, and The Ring
-1	3	Naoya Inoue	31–0 (27 KO)	Super bantamweight	WBA (Super), WBC, IBF, WBO, and The Ring
—N/a	4	Dmitry Bivol	24–1 (12 KO)	Light heavyweight	WBA (Super), IBF, WBO, and The Ring
—N/a	5	Artur Beterbiev	21–1 (20 KO)	Light heavyweight	—N/a
—N/a	6	Jesse Rodriguez	22–0 (15 KO)	Super flyweight	WBC, WBO, and The Ring
—N/a	7	Junto Nakatani	31–0 (24 KO)	Bantamweight	WBC, IBF, and The Ring
+1	8	Shakur Stevenson	24–0 (11 KO)	Lightweight	WBC
+1	9	David Benavidez	30–0 (24 KO)	Light heavyweight	WBC
-2	10	Canelo Álvarez	63–3–2 (39 KO)	Super middleweight	—N/a

August 7, 2025
Changes	Rank	Boxer	Record	Weight class	Title(s)
—N/a	1	Oleksandr Usyk	24–0 (15 KO)	Heavyweight	WBA (Super), WBC, IBF, WBO, and The Ring
—N/a	2	Naoya Inoue	30–0 (27 KO)	Super bantamweight	WBA (Super), WBC, IBF, WBO, and The Ring
—N/a	3	Terence Crawford	41–0 (31 KO)	Light middleweight	WBA
—N/a	4	Dmitry Bivol	24–1 (12 KO)	Light heavyweight	WBA (Super), IBF, WBO, and The Ring
—N/a	5	Artur Beterbiev	21–1 (20 KO)	Light heavyweight	—N/a
+1	6	Jesse Rodriguez	22–0 (15 KO)	Super flyweight	WBC, WBO, and The Ring
-1	7	Junto Nakatani	31–0 (24 KO)	Bantamweight	WBC, IBF, and The Ring
—N/a	8	Canelo Álvarez	63–2–2 (39 KO)	Super middleweight	WBA (Super), WBC, IBF, WBO, and The Ring
+1	9	Shakur Stevenson	24–0 (11 KO)	Lightweight	WBC
New	10	David Benavidez	30–0 (24 KO)	Light heavyweight	WBC

July 16, 2025
Changes	Rank	Boxer	Record	Weight class	Title(s)
—N/a	1	Oleksandr Usyk	23–0 (14 KO)	Heavyweight	WBA (Super), WBC, WBO, and The Ring
—N/a	2	Naoya Inoue	30–0 (27 KO)	Super bantamweight	WBA (Super), WBC, IBF, WBO, and The Ring
—N/a	3	Terence Crawford	41–0 (31 KO)	Light middleweight	WBA
—N/a	4	Dmitry Bivol	24–1 (12 KO)	Light heavyweight	WBA (Super), IBF, WBO, and The Ring
—N/a	5	Artur Beterbiev	21–1 (20 KO)	Light heavyweight	—N/a
—N/a	6	Junto Nakatani	31–0 (24 KO)	Bantamweight	WBC, IBF, and The Ring
—N/a	7	Jesse Rodriguez	21–0 (14 KO)	Super flyweight	WBC and The Ring
—N/a	8	Canelo Álvarez	63–2–2 (39 KO)	Super middleweight	WBA (Super), WBC, IBF, WBO, and The Ring
—N/a	9	Kenshiro Teraji	25–1 (16 KO)	Flyweight	WBA and WBC
New	10	Shakur Stevenson	24–0 (11 KO)	Lightweight	WBC

June 11, 2025
Changes	Rank	Boxer	Record	Weight class	Title(s)
—N/a	1	Oleksandr Usyk	23–0 (14 KO)	Heavyweight	WBA (Super), WBC, WBO, and The Ring
—N/a	2	Naoya Inoue	30–0 (27 KO)	Super bantamweight	WBA (Super), WBC, IBF, WBO, and The Ring
—N/a	3	Terence Crawford	41–0 (31 KO)	Light middleweight	WBA
—N/a	4	Dmitry Bivol	24–1 (12 KO)	Light heavyweight	WBA (Super), IBF, WBO, and The Ring
—N/a	5	Artur Beterbiev	21–1 (20 KO)	Light heavyweight	—N/a
+1	6	Junto Nakatani	31–0 (24 KO)	Bantamweight	WBC, IBF, and The Ring
-1	7	Jesse Rodriguez	21–0 (14 KO)	Super flyweight	WBC and The Ring
—N/a	8	Canelo Álvarez	63–2–2 (39 KO)	Super middleweight	WBA (Super), WBC, IBF, WBO, and The Ring
—N/a	9	Kenshiro Teraji	25–1 (16 KO)	Flyweight	WBA and WBC
—N/a	10	David Benavidez	30–0 (24 KO)	Light heavyweight	WBC

May 7, 2025
Changes	Rank	Boxer	Record	Weight class	Title(s)
—N/a	1	Oleksandr Usyk	23–0 (14 KO)	Heavyweight	WBA (Super), WBC, WBO, and The Ring
—N/a	2	Naoya Inoue	30–0 (27 KO)	Super bantamweight	WBA (Super), WBC, IBF, WBO, and The Ring
—N/a	3	Terence Crawford	41–0 (31 KO)	Light middleweight	WBA
—N/a	4	Dmitry Bivol	24–1 (12 KO)	Light heavyweight	WBA (Super), IBF, WBO, and The Ring
—N/a	5	Artur Beterbiev	21–1 (20 KO)	Light heavyweight	—N/a
—N/a	6	Jesse Rodriguez	21–0 (14 KO)	Super flyweight	WBC and The Ring
+1	7	Junto Nakatani	30–0 (23 KO)	Bantamweight	WBC
-1	8	Canelo Álvarez	63–2–2 (39 KO)	Super middleweight	WBA (Super), WBC, IBF, WBO, and The Ring
+1	9	Kenshiro Teraji	25–1 (16 KO)	Flyweight	WBA and WBC
New	10	David Benavidez	30–0 (24 KO)	Light heavyweight	WBC

March 19, 2025
Changes	Rank	Boxer	Record	Weight class	Title(s)
—N/a	1	Oleksandr Usyk	23–0 (14 KO)	Heavyweight	WBA (Super), WBC, WBO, and The Ring
—N/a	2	Naoya Inoue	29–0 (26 KO)	Super bantamweight	WBA (Super), WBC, IBF, WBO, and The Ring
—N/a	3	Terence Crawford	41–0 (31 KO)	Light middleweight	WBA
—N/a	4	Dmitry Bivol	24–1 (12 KO)	Light heavyweight	WBA (Super), WBC, IBF, WBO, and The Ring
—N/a	5	Artur Beterbiev	21–1 (20 KO)	Light heavyweight	—N/a
—N/a	6	Jesse Rodriguez	21–0 (14 KO)	Super flyweight	WBC and The Ring
—N/a	7	Canelo Álvarez	62–2–2 (39 KO)	Super middleweight	WBA (Super), WBC, WBO, and The Ring
—N/a	8	Junto Nakatani	30–0 (23 KO)	Bantamweight	WBC
—N/a	9	Devin Haney	31–0–0–1 (15 KO)	Light welterweight	—N/a
New	10	Kenshiro Teraji	25–1 (16 KO)	Flyweight	WBA and WBC

March 9, 2025
Changes	Rank	Boxer	Record	Weight class	Title(s)
—N/a	1	Oleksandr Usyk	23–0 (14 KO)	Heavyweight	WBA (Super), WBC, WBO, and The Ring
—N/a	2	Naoya Inoue	29–0 (26 KO)	Super bantamweight	WBA (Super), WBC, IBF, WBO, and The Ring
—N/a	3	Terence Crawford	41–0 (31 KO)	Light middleweight	WBA
—N/a	4	Dmitry Bivol	24–1 (12 KO)	Light heavyweight	WBA (Super), WBC, IBF, WBO, and The Ring
—N/a	5	Artur Beterbiev	21–1 (20 KO)	Light heavyweight	—N/a
—N/a	6	Jesse Rodriguez	21–0 (14 KO)	Super flyweight	WBC and The Ring
—N/a	7	Canelo Álvarez	62–2–2 (39 KO)	Super middleweight	WBA (Super), WBC, WBO, and The Ring
+1	8	Junto Nakatani	30–0 (23 KO)	Bantamweight	WBC
+1	9	Devin Haney	31–0–0–1 (15 KO)	Light welterweight	—N/a
New	10	David Benavidez	30–0 (24 KO)	Light heavyweight	—N/a

February 22, 2025
Changes	Rank	Boxer	Record	Weight class	Title(s)
—N/a	1	Oleksandr Usyk	23–0 (14 KO)	Heavyweight	WBA (Super), WBC, WBO, and The Ring
—N/a	2	Naoya Inoue	29–0 (26 KO)	Super bantamweight	WBA (Super), WBC, IBF, WBO, and The Ring
—N/a	3	Terence Crawford	41–0 (31 KO)	Light middleweight	WBA
+1	4	Dmitry Bivol	24–1 (12 KO)	Light heavyweight	WBA (Super), WBC, IBF, WBO, and The Ring
-1	5	Artur Beterbiev	21–1 (20 KO)	Light heavyweight	—N/a
—N/a	6	Jesse Rodriguez	21–0 (14 KO)	Super flyweight	WBC and The Ring
—N/a	7	Canelo Álvarez	62–2–2 (39 KO)	Super middleweight	WBA (Super), WBC, WBO, and The Ring
—N/a	8	Gervonta Davis	30–0 (28 KO)	Lightweight	WBA
—N/a	9	Junto Nakatani	29–0 (22 KO)	Bantamweight	WBC
—N/a	10	Devin Haney	31–0–0–1 (15 KO)	Light welterweight	—N/a

== 2024 ==
December 7, 2024
Changes	Rank	Boxer	Record	Weight class	Title(s)
—N/a	1	Oleksandr Usyk	23–0 (14 KO)	Heavyweight	WBA (Super), WBC, WBO, and The Ring
—N/a	2	Naoya Inoue	28–0 (25 KO)	Super bantamweight	WBA (Super), WBC, IBF, WBO, and The Ring
—N/a	3	Terence Crawford	41–0 (31 KO)	Light middleweight	WBA
—N/a	4	Artur Beterbiev	21–0 (20 KO)	Light heavyweight	WBA (Super), WBC, IBF, WBO, and The Ring
—N/a	5	Dmitry Bivol	23–1 (12 KO)	Light heavyweight	—N/a
+1	6	Jesse Rodriguez	21–0 (14 KO)	Super flyweight	WBC and The Ring
-1	7	Canelo Álvarez	62–2–2 (39 KO)	Super middleweight	WBA (Super), WBC, WBO, and The Ring
—N/a	8	Gervonta Davis	30–0 (28 KO)	Lightweight	WBA
—N/a	9	Junto Nakatani	29–0 (22 KO)	Bantamweight	WBC
—N/a	10	Devin Haney	31–0–0–1 (15 KO)	Light welterweight	—N/a

October 14, 2024
Changes	Rank	Boxer	Record	Weight class	Title(s)
—N/a	1	Oleksandr Usyk	23–0 (14 KO)	Heavyweight	WBA (Super), WBC, WBO, and The Ring
—N/a	2	Naoya Inoue	28–0 (25 KO)	Super bantamweight	WBA (Super), WBC, IBF, WBO, and The Ring
—N/a	3	Terence Crawford	41–0 (31 KO)	Light middleweight	WBA
+2	4	Artur Beterbiev	21–0 (20 KO)	Light heavyweight	WBA (Super), WBC, IBF, WBO, and The Ring
+2	5	Dmitry Bivol	23–1 (12 KO)	Light heavyweight	—N/a
-2	6	Canelo Álvarez	62–2–2 (39 KO)	Super middleweight	WBA (Super), WBC, WBO, and The Ring
-2	7	Jesse Rodriguez	20–0 (13 KO)	Super flyweight	WBC and The Ring
—N/a	8	Gervonta Davis	30–0 (28 KO)	Lightweight	WBA
—N/a	9	Junto Nakatani	29–0 (22 KO)	Bantamweight	WBC
—N/a	10	Devin Haney	31–0–0–1 (15 KO)	Light welterweight	—N/a

July 27, 2024
Changes	Rank	Boxer	Record	Weight class	Title(s)
—N/a	1	Oleksandr Usyk	22–0 (14 KO)	Heavyweight	WBA (Super), WBC, WBO, and The Ring
—N/a	2	Naoya Inoue	27–0 (24 KO)	Super bantamweight	WBA (Super), WBC, IBF, WBO, and The Ring
—N/a	3	Terence Crawford	40–0 (31 KO)	Welterweight	WBA (Super), WBO, and The Ring
—N/a	4	Canelo Álvarez	61–2–2 (39 KO)	Super middleweight	WBA (Super), WBC, WBO, and The Ring
—N/a	5	Jesse Rodriguez	20–0 (13 KO)	Super flyweight	WBC and The Ring
—N/a	6	Artur Beterbiev	20–0 (20 KO)	Light heavyweight	WBC, IBF, and WBO
—N/a	7	Dmitry Bivol	23–0 (12 KO)	Light heavyweight	WBA (Super)
—N/a	8	Gervonta Davis	30–0 (28 KO)	Lightweight	WBA
—N/a	9	Junto Nakatani	28–0 (21 KO)	Bantamweight	WBC
New	10	Devin Haney	31–0–0–1 (15 KO)	Light welterweight	—N/a

July 20, 2024
Changes	Rank	Boxer	Record	Weight class	Title(s)
—N/a	1	Oleksandr Usyk	22–0 (14 KO)	Heavyweight	WBA (Super), WBC, WBO, and The Ring
—N/a	2	Naoya Inoue	27–0 (24 KO)	Super bantamweight	WBA (Super), WBC, IBF, WBO, and The Ring
—N/a	3	Terence Crawford	40–0 (31 KO)	Welterweight	WBA (Super), WBO, and The Ring
—N/a	4	Canelo Álvarez	61–2–2 (39 KO)	Super middleweight	WBA (Super), WBC, IBF, WBO, and The Ring
—N/a	5	Jesse Rodriguez	20–0 (13 KO)	Super flyweight	WBC and The Ring
—N/a	6	Artur Beterbiev	20–0 (20 KO)	Light heavyweight	WBC, IBF, and WBO
—N/a	7	Dmitry Bivol	23–0 (12 KO)	Light heavyweight	WBA (Super)
—N/a	8	Gervonta Davis	30–0 (28 KO)	Lightweight	WBA
+1	9	Junto Nakatani	28–0 (21 KO)	Bantamweight	WBC
-1	10	Errol Spence Jr.	28–1 (22 KO)	Welterweight	—N/a

June 29, 2024
Changes	Rank	Boxer	Record	Weight class	Title(s)
—N/a	1	Oleksandr Usyk	22–0 (14 KO)	Heavyweight	WBA (Super), WBC, WBO, and The Ring
—N/a	2	Naoya Inoue	27–0 (24 KO)	Super bantamweight	WBA (Super), WBC, IBF, WBO, and The Ring
—N/a	3	Terence Crawford	40–0 (31 KO)	Welterweight	WBA (Super), WBO, and The Ring
—N/a	4	Canelo Álvarez	61–2–2 (39 KO)	Super middleweight	WBA (Super), WBC, IBF, WBO, and The Ring
+4	5	Jesse Rodriguez	20–0 (13 KO)	Super flyweight	WBC and The Ring
-1	6	Artur Beterbiev	20–0 (20 KO)	Light heavyweight	WBC, IBF, and WBO
-1	7	Dmitry Bivol	23–0 (12 KO)	Light heavyweight	WBA (Super)
-1	8	Gervonta Davis	30–0 (28 KO)	Lightweight	WBA
-1	9	Errol Spence Jr.	28–1 (22 KO)	Welterweight	—N/a
—N/a	10	Junto Nakatani	27–0 (20 KO)	Bantamweight	WBC

June 15, 2024
Changes	Rank	Boxer	Record	Weight class	Title(s)
—N/a	1	Oleksandr Usyk	22–0 (14 KO)	Heavyweight	WBA (Super), WBC, IBF, WBO, and The Ring
—N/a	2	Naoya Inoue	27–0 (24 KO)	Super bantamweight	WBA (Super), WBC, IBF, WBO, and The Ring
—N/a	3	Terence Crawford	40–0 (31 KO)	Welterweight	WBA (Super), WBC, WBO, and The Ring
—N/a	4	Canelo Álvarez	61–2–2 (39 KO)	Super middleweight	WBA (Super), WBC, IBF, WBO, and The Ring
—N/a	5	Artur Beterbiev	20–0 (20 KO)	Light heavyweight	WBC, IBF, and WBO
—N/a	6	Dmitry Bivol	23–0 (12 KO)	Light heavyweight	WBA (Super)
+1	7	Gervonta Davis	30–0 (28 KO)	Lightweight	WBA
-1	8	Errol Spence Jr.	28–1 (22 KO)	Welterweight	—N/a
—N/a	9	Jesse Rodriguez	19–0 (12 KO)	Flyweight	—N/a
—N/a	10	Junto Nakatani	27–0 (20 KO)	Bantamweight	WBC

May 18, 2024
Changes	Rank	Boxer	Record	Weight class	Title(s)
+2	1	Oleksandr Usyk	22–0 (14 KO)	Heavyweight	WBA (Super), WBC, IBF, WBO, and The Ring
-1	2	Naoya Inoue	27–0 (24 KO)	Super bantamweight	WBA (Super), WBC, IBF, WBO, and The Ring
-1	3	Terence Crawford	40–0 (31 KO)	Welterweight	WBA (Super), WBC, WBO, and The Ring
—N/a	4	Canelo Álvarez	61–2–2 (39 KO)	Super middleweight	WBA (Super), WBC, IBF, WBO, and The Ring
—N/a	5	Artur Beterbiev	20–0 (20 KO)	Light heavyweight	WBC, IBF, and WBO
—N/a	6	Dmitry Bivol	22–0 (11 KO)	Light heavyweight	WBA (Super)
—N/a	7	Errol Spence Jr.	28–1 (22 KO)	Welterweight	—N/a
—N/a	8	Gervonta Davis	29–0 (27 KO)	Lightweight	WBA
—N/a	9	Jesse Rodriguez	19–0 (12 KO)	Flyweight	—N/a
—N/a	10	Junto Nakatani	27–0 (20 KO)	Bantamweight	WBC

May 6, 2024
Changes	Rank	Boxer	Record	Weight class	Title(s)
+1	1	Naoya Inoue	27–0 (24 KO)	Super bantamweight	WBA (Super), WBC, IBF, WBO, and The Ring
-1	2	Terence Crawford	40–0 (31 KO)	Welterweight	WBA (Super), WBC, WBO, and The Ring
—N/a	3	Oleksandr Usyk	21–0 (14 KO)	Heavyweight	WBA (Super), IBF, WBO, and The Ring
—N/a	4	Canelo Álvarez	61–2–2 (39 KO)	Super middleweight	WBA (Super), WBC, IBF, WBO, and The Ring
—N/a	5	Artur Beterbiev	20–0 (20 KO)	Light heavyweight	WBC, IBF, and WBO
—N/a	6	Dmitry Bivol	22–0 (11 KO)	Light heavyweight	WBA (Super)
—N/a	7	Errol Spence Jr.	28–1 (22 KO)	Welterweight	—N/a
—N/a	8	Gervonta Davis	29–0 (27 KO)	Lightweight	WBA
—N/a	9	Jesse Rodriguez	19–0 (12 KO)	Flyweight	—N/a
—N/a	10	Junto Nakatani	27–0 (20 KO)	Bantamweight	WBC

April 20, 2024
Changes	Rank	Boxer	Record	Weight class	Title(s)
—N/a	1	Terence Crawford	40–0 (31 KO)	Welterweight	WBA (Super), WBC, WBO, and The Ring
—N/a	2	Naoya Inoue	26–0 (23 KO)	Super bantamweight	WBA (Super), WBC, IBF, WBO, and The Ring
—N/a	3	Oleksandr Usyk	21–0 (14 KO)	Heavyweight	WBA (Super), IBF, WBO, and The Ring
—N/a	4	Canelo Álvarez	60–2–2 (39 KO)	Super middleweight	WBA (Super), WBC, IBF, WBO, and The Ring
—N/a	5	Artur Beterbiev	20–0 (20 KO)	Light heavyweight	WBC, IBF, and WBO
—N/a	6	Dmitry Bivol	22–0 (11 KO)	Light heavyweight	WBA (Super)
+1	7	Errol Spence Jr.	28–1 (22 KO)	Welterweight	—N/a
+1	8	Gervonta Davis	29–0 (27 KO)	Lightweight	WBA
+1	9	Jesse Rodriguez	19–0 (12 KO)	Flyweight	—N/a
New	10	Junto Nakatani	27–0 (20 KO)	Bantamweight	WBC

February 10, 2024
Changes	Rank	Boxer	Record	Weight class	Title(s)
—N/a	1	Terence Crawford	40–0 (31 KO)	Welterweight	WBA (Super), WBC, WBO, and The Ring
—N/a	2	Naoya Inoue	26–0 (23 KO)	Super bantamweight	WBA (Super), WBC, IBF, WBO, and The Ring
—N/a	3	Oleksandr Usyk	21–0 (14 KO)	Heavyweight	WBA (Super), IBF, WBO, and The Ring
—N/a	4	Canelo Álvarez	60–2–2 (39 KO)	Super middleweight	WBA (Super), WBC, IBF, WBO, and The Ring
—N/a	5	Artur Beterbiev	20–0 (20 KO)	Light heavyweight	WBC, IBF, and WBO
—N/a	6	Dmitry Bivol	22–0 (11 KO)	Light heavyweight	WBA (Super)
—N/a	7	Devin Haney	31–0 (15 KO)	Light welterweight	WBC
—N/a	8	Errol Spence Jr.	28–1 (22 KO)	Welterweight	—N/a
—N/a	9	Gervonta Davis	29–0 (27 KO)	Lightweight	WBA
New	10	Jesse Rodriguez	19–0 (12 KO)	Flyweight	IBF and WBO

January 13, 2024
Changes	Rank	Boxer	Record	Weight class	Title(s)
—N/a	1	Terence Crawford	40–0 (31 KO)	Welterweight	WBA (Super), WBC, WBO, and The Ring
—N/a	2	Naoya Inoue	26–0 (23 KO)	Super bantamweight	WBA (Super), WBC, IBF, WBO, and The Ring
—N/a	3	Oleksandr Usyk	21–0 (14 KO)	Heavyweight	WBA (Super), IBF, WBO, and The Ring
—N/a	4	Canelo Álvarez	60–2–2 (39 KO)	Super middleweight	WBA (Super), WBC, IBF, WBO, and The Ring
New	5	Artur Beterbiev	20–0 (20 KO)	Light heavyweight	WBC, IBF, and WBO
-1	6	Dmitry Bivol	22–0 (11 KO)	Light heavyweight	WBA (Super)
-1	7	Devin Haney	31–0 (15 KO)	Light welterweight	WBC
-1	8	Errol Spence Jr.	28–1 (22 KO)	Welterweight	—N/a
-1	9	Gervonta Davis	29–0 (27 KO)	Lightweight	WBA
-1	10	Teofimo Lopez	19–1 (13 KO)	Light welterweight	WBO and The Ring

== 2023 ==
December 16, 2023
Changes	Rank	Boxer	Record	Weight class	Title(s)
—N/a	1	Terence Crawford	40–0 (31 KO)	Welterweight	WBA (Super), WBC, WBO, and The Ring
—N/a	2	Naoya Inoue	25–0 (22 KO)	Super bantamweight	WBC and WBO
—N/a	3	Oleksandr Usyk	21–0 (14 KO)	Heavyweight	WBA (Super), IBF, WBO, and The Ring
—N/a	4	Canelo Álvarez	60–2–2 (39 KO)	Super middleweight	WBA (Super), WBC, IBF, WBO, and The Ring
—N/a	5	Dmitry Bivol	21–0 (11 KO)	Light heavyweight	WBA (Super)
—N/a	6	Devin Haney	31–0 (15 KO)	Light welterweight	WBC
—N/a	7	Errol Spence Jr.	28–1 (22 KO)	Welterweight	—N/a
—N/a	8	Gervonta Davis	29–0 (27 KO)	Lightweight	WBA
—N/a	9	Teofimo Lopez	19–1 (13 KO)	Light welterweight	WBO and The Ring
New	10	Jesse Rodriguez	19–0 (12 KO)	Flyweight	IBF and WBO

December 9, 2023
Changes	Rank	Boxer	Record	Weight class	Title(s)
—N/a	1	Terence Crawford	40–0 (31 KO)	Welterweight	WBA (Super), WBC, WBO, and The Ring
—N/a	2	Naoya Inoue	25–0 (22 KO)	Super bantamweight	WBC and WBO
—N/a	3	Oleksandr Usyk	21–0 (14 KO)	Heavyweight	WBA (Super), IBF, WBO, and The Ring
—N/a	4	Canelo Álvarez	60–2–2 (39 KO)	Super middleweight	WBA (Super), WBC, IBF, WBO, and The Ring
—N/a	5	Dmitry Bivol	21–0 (11 KO)	Light heavyweight	WBA (Super)
+1	6	Devin Haney	31–0 (15 KO)	Light welterweight	WBC
-1	7	Errol Spence Jr.	28–1 (22 KO)	Welterweight	—N/a
—N/a	8	Gervonta Davis	29–0 (27 KO)	Lightweight	WBA
—N/a	9	Teofimo Lopez	19–1 (13 KO)	Light welterweight	WBO and The Ring
—N/a	10	Vasiliy Lomachenko	17–3 (11 KO)	Lightweight	—N/a

July 29, 2023
Changes	Rank	Boxer	Record	Weight class	Title(s)
+2	1	Terence Crawford	40–0 (31 KO)	Welterweight	WBA (Super), WBC, IBF, WBO, and The Ring
—N/a	2	Naoya Inoue	25–0 (22 KO)	Super bantamweight	WBC and WBO
-2	3	Oleksandr Usyk	20–0 (13 KO)	Heavyweight	WBA (Super), IBF, WBO, and The Ring
+1	4	Canelo Álvarez	59–2–2 (39 KO)	Super middleweight	WBA (Super), WBC, IBF, WBO, and The Ring
+1	5	Dmitry Bivol	21–0 (11 KO)	Light heavyweight	WBA (Super)
-2	6	Errol Spence Jr.	28–1 (22 KO)	Welterweight	—N/a
—N/a	7	Devin Haney	30–0 (15 KO)	Lightweight	WBA (Super), WBC, IBF, WBO, and The Ring
—N/a	8	Gervonta Davis	29–0 (27 KO)	Lightweight	—N/a
—N/a	9	Teofimo Lopez	19–1 (13 KO)	Light welterweight	WBO and The Ring
—N/a	10	Vasiliy Lomachenko	17–3 (11 KO)	Lightweight	—N/a

June 10, 2023
Changes	Rank	Boxer	Record	Weight class	Title(s)
—N/a	1	Oleksandr Usyk	20–0 (13 KO)	Heavyweight	WBA (Super), IBF, WBO, and The Ring
—N/a	2	Naoya Inoue	24–0 (21 KO)	Bantamweight	—N/a
—N/a	3	Terence Crawford	39–0 (30 KO)	Welterweight	WBO
—N/a	4	Errol Spence Jr.	28–0 (22 KO)	Welterweight	WBA (Super), WBC, and IBF
—N/a	5	Canelo Álvarez	59–2–2 (39 KO)	Super middleweight	WBA (Super), WBC, IBF, WBO, and The Ring
—N/a	6	Dmitry Bivol	21–0 (11 KO)	Light heavyweight	WBA (Super)
+1	7	Devin Haney	30–0 (15 KO)	Lightweight	WBA (Super), WBC, IBF, WBO, and The Ring
+1	8	Gervonta Davis	29–0 (27 KO)	Lightweight	—N/a
New	9	Teofimo Lopez	19–1 (13 KO)	Light welterweight	WBO and The Ring
—N/a	10	Vasiliy Lomachenko	17–3 (11 KO)	Lightweight	—N/a

May 20, 2023
Changes	Rank	Boxer	Record	Weight class	Title(s)
—N/a	1	Oleksandr Usyk	20–0 (13 KO)	Heavyweight	WBA (Super), IBF, WBO, and The Ring
—N/a	2	Naoya Inoue	24–0 (21 KO)	Bantamweight	—N/a
—N/a	3	Terence Crawford	39–0 (30 KO)	Welterweight	WBO
—N/a	4	Errol Spence Jr.	28–0 (22 KO)	Welterweight	WBA (Super), WBC, and IBF
—N/a	5	Canelo Álvarez	59–2–2 (39 KO)	Super middleweight	WBA (Super), WBC, IBF, WBO, and The Ring
—N/a	6	Dmitry Bivol	21–0 (11 KO)	Light heavyweight	WBA (Super)
+1	7	Josh Taylor	19–0 (13 KO)	Light welterweight	WBO and The Ring
New	8	Devin Haney	30–0 (15 KO)	Lightweight	WBA (Super), WBC, IBF, WBO, and The Ring
+1	9	Gervonta Davis	29–0 (27 KO)	Lightweight	—N/a
-3	10	Vasiliy Lomachenko	17–3 (11 KO)	Lightweight	—N/a

April 22, 2023
Changes	Rank	Boxer	Record	Weight class	Title(s)
—N/a	1	Oleksandr Usyk	20–0 (13 KO)	Heavyweight	WBA (Super), IBF, WBO, and The Ring
—N/a	2	Naoya Inoue	24–0 (21 KO)	Bantamweight	—N/a
—N/a	3	Terence Crawford	39–0 (30 KO)	Welterweight	WBO
—N/a	4	Errol Spence Jr.	28–0 (22 KO)	Welterweight	WBA (Super), WBC, and IBF
—N/a	5	Canelo Álvarez	58–2–2 (39 KO)	Super middleweight	WBA (Super), WBC, IBF, WBO, and The Ring
—N/a	6	Dmitry Bivol	21–0 (11 KO)	Light heavyweight	WBA (Super)
—N/a	7	Vasiliy Lomachenko	17–2 (11 KO)	Lightweight	—N/a
—N/a	8	Josh Taylor	19–0 (13 KO)	Light welterweight	WBO and The Ring
—N/a	9	Jermell Charlo	35–1–1 (19 KO)	Light middleweight	WBA (Super), WBC, IBF, WBO, and The Ring
New	10	Gervonta Davis	29–0 (27 KO)	Lightweight	—N/a

== 2022 ==
December 10, 2022
Changes	Rank	Boxer	Record	Weight class	Title(s)
—N/a	1	Oleksandr Usyk	20–0 (13 KO)	Heavyweight	WBA (Super), IBF, WBO, and The Ring
—N/a	2	Naoya Inoue	23–0 (20 KO)	Bantamweight	WBA (Super), WBC, IBF, and The Ring
—N/a	3	Terence Crawford	39–0 (30 KO)	Welterweight	WBO
—N/a	4	Errol Spence Jr.	28–0 (22 KO)	Welterweight	WBA (Super), WBC, and IBF
—N/a	5	Canelo Álvarez	58–2–2 (39 KO)	Super middleweight	WBA (Super), WBC, IBF, WBO, and The Ring
—N/a	6	Dmitry Bivol	21–0 (11 KO)	Light heavyweight	WBA (Super)
—N/a	7	Vasiliy Lomachenko	17–2 (11 KO)	Lightweight	—N/a
—N/a	8	Josh Taylor	19–0 (13 KO)	Light welterweight	WBO and The Ring
—N/a	9	Jermell Charlo	35–1–1 (19 KO)	Light middleweight	WBA (Super), WBC, IBF, WBO, and The Ring
New	10	Juan Francisco Estrada	44–3 (28 KO)	Super flyweight	WBC and The Ring

November 5, 2022
Changes	Rank	Boxer	Record	Weight class	Title(s)
—N/a	1	Oleksandr Usyk	20–0 (13 KO)	Heavyweight	WBA (Super), IBF, WBO, and The Ring
—N/a	2	Naoya Inoue	23–0 (20 KO)	Bantamweight	WBA (Super), WBC, IBF, and The Ring
—N/a	3	Terence Crawford	38–0 (29 KO)	Welterweight	WBO
—N/a	4	Errol Spence Jr.	28–0 (22 KO)	Welterweight	WBA (Super), WBC, and IBF
—N/a	5	Canelo Álvarez	58–2–2 (39 KO)	Super middleweight	WBA (Super), WBC, IBF, WBO, and The Ring
+1	6	Dmitry Bivol	21–0 (11 KO)	Light heavyweight	WBA (Super)
-1	7	Vasiliy Lomachenko	17–2 (11 KO)	Lightweight	—N/a
—N/a	8	Josh Taylor	19–0 (13 KO)	Light welterweight	WBO and The Ring
—N/a	9	Jermell Charlo	35–1–1 (19 KO)	Light middleweight	WBA (Super), WBC, IBF, WBO, and The Ring
—N/a	10	Artur Beterbiev	18–0 (18 KO)	Light heavyweight	WBC, IBF, and WBO

August 20, 2022
Changes	Rank	Boxer	Record	Weight class	Title(s)
+1	1	Oleksandr Usyk	20–0 (13 KO)	Heavyweight	WBA (Super), IBF, WBO, and The Ring
-1	2	Naoya Inoue	23–0 (20 KO)	Bantamweight	WBA (Super), WBC, IBF, and The Ring
—N/a	3	Terence Crawford	38–0 (29 KO)	Welterweight	WBO
—N/a	4	Errol Spence Jr.	28–0 (22 KO)	Welterweight	WBA (Super), WBC, and IBF
—N/a	5	Canelo Álvarez	57–2–2 (39 KO)	Super middleweight	WBA (Super), WBC, IBF, WBO, and The Ring
—N/a	6	Vasiliy Lomachenko	16–2 (11 KO)	Lightweight	—N/a
—N/a	7	Dmitry Bivol	20–0 (11 KO)	Light heavyweight	WBA (Super)
—N/a	8	Josh Taylor	19–0 (13 KO)	Light welterweight	IBF, WBO, and The Ring
—N/a	9	Jermell Charlo	35–1–1 (19 KO)	Light middleweight	WBA (Super), WBC, IBF, WBO, and The Ring
—N/a	10	Artur Beterbiev	18–0 (18 KO)	Light heavyweight	WBC, IBF, and WBO

June 23, 2022
Changes	Rank	Boxer	Record	Weight class	Title(s)
—N/a	1	Naoya Inoue	23–0 (20 KO)	Bantamweight	WBA (Super), WBC, IBF, and The Ring
—N/a	2	Oleksandr Usyk	19–0 (13 KO)	Heavyweight	WBA (Super), IBF, and WBO
—N/a	3	Terence Crawford	38–0 (29 KO)	Welterweight	WBO
—N/a	4	Errol Spence Jr.	28–0 (22 KO)	Welterweight	WBA (Super), WBC, and IBF
+1	5	Canelo Álvarez	57–2–2 (39 KO)	Super middleweight	WBA (Super), WBC, IBF, WBO, and The Ring
+1	6	Vasiliy Lomachenko	16–2 (11 KO)	Lightweight	—N/a
+1	7	Dmitry Bivol	20–0 (11 KO)	Light heavyweight	WBA (Super)
+1	8	Josh Taylor	19–0 (13 KO)	Light welterweight	WBC, IBF, WBO, and The Ring
+1	9	Jermell Charlo	35–1–1 (19 KO)	Light middleweight	WBA (Super), WBC, IBF, WBO, and The Ring
New	10	Artur Beterbiev	18–0 (18 KO)	Light heavyweight	WBC, IBF, and WBO

June 4, 2022
Changes	Rank	Boxer	Record	Weight class	Title(s)
+2	1	Naoya Inoue	23–0 (20 KO)	Bantamweight	WBA (Super), WBC, IBF, and The Ring
-1	2	Oleksandr Usyk	19–0 (13 KO)	Heavyweight	WBA (Super), IBF, and WBO
-1	3	Terence Crawford	38–0 (29 KO)	Welterweight	WBO
—N/a	4	Errol Spence Jr.	28–0 (22 KO)	Welterweight	WBA (Super), WBC, and IBF
—N/a	5	Juan Francisco Estrada	42–3 (28 KO)	Super flyweight	WBA (Super) and The Ring
—N/a	6	Canelo Álvarez	57–2–2 (39 KO)	Super middleweight	WBA (Super), WBC, IBF, WBO, and The Ring
—N/a	7	Vasiliy Lomachenko	16–2 (11 KO)	Lightweight	—N/a
—N/a	8	Dmitry Bivol	20–0 (11 KO)	Light heavyweight	WBA (Super)
—N/a	9	Josh Taylor	19–0 (13 KO)	Light welterweight	WBC, IBF, WBO, and The Ring
—N/a	10	Jermell Charlo	35–1–1 (19 KO)	Light middleweight	WBA (Super), WBC, IBF, WBO, and The Ring

May 14, 2022
Changes	Rank	Boxer	Record	Weight class	Title(s)
—N/a	1	Oleksandr Usyk	19–0 (13 KO)	Heavyweight	WBA (Super), IBF, and WBO
—N/a	2	Terence Crawford	38–0 (29 KO)	Welterweight	WBO
—N/a	3	Naoya Inoue	22–0 (19 KO)	Bantamweight	WBA (Super), IBF, and The Ring
—N/a	4	Errol Spence Jr.	28–0 (22 KO)	Welterweight	WBA (Super), WBC, and IBF
—N/a	5	Juan Francisco Estrada	42–3 (28 KO)	Super flyweight	WBA (Super) and The Ring
—N/a	6	Canelo Álvarez	57–2–2 (39 KO)	Super middleweight	WBA (Super), WBC, IBF, WBO, and The Ring
—N/a	7	Vasiliy Lomachenko	16–2 (11 KO)	Lightweight	—N/a
—N/a	8	Dmitry Bivol	20–0 (11 KO)	Light heavyweight	WBA (Super)
—N/a	9	Josh Taylor	19–0 (13 KO)	Light welterweight	WBC, IBF, WBO, and The Ring
New	10	Jermell Charlo	35–1–1 (19 KO)	Light middleweight	WBA (Super), WBC, IBF, WBO, and The Ring

May 7, 2022
Changes	Rank	Boxer	Record	Weight class	Title(s)
+1	1	Oleksandr Usyk	19–0 (13 KO)	Heavyweight	WBA (Super), IBF, and WBO
+1	2	Terence Crawford	38–0 (29 KO)	Welterweight	WBO
+1	3	Naoya Inoue	22–0 (19 KO)	Bantamweight	WBA (Super), IBF, and The Ring
+1	4	Errol Spence Jr.	28–0 (22 KO)	Welterweight	WBA (Super), WBC, and IBF
+1	5	Juan Francisco Estrada	42–3 (28 KO)	Super flyweight	WBA (Super) and The Ring
-5	6	Canelo Álvarez	57–2–2 (39 KO)	Super middleweight	WBA (Super), WBC, IBF, WBO, and The Ring
—N/a	7	Vasiliy Lomachenko	16–2 (11 KO)	Lightweight	—N/a
New	8	Dmitry Bivol	20–0 (11 KO)	Light heavyweight	WBA (Super)
-1	9	Josh Taylor	19–0 (13 KO)	Light welterweight	WBA (Super), WBC, IBF, WBO, and The Ring
-1	10	Román González	51–3 (41 KO)	Super flyweight	—N/a

March 16, 2022
Changes	Rank	Boxer	Record	Weight class	Title(s)
—N/a	1	Canelo Álvarez	57–1–2 (39 KO)	Super middleweight	WBA (Super), WBC, IBF, WBO, and The Ring
—N/a	2	Oleksandr Usyk	19–0 (13 KO)	Heavyweight	WBA (Super), IBF, and WBO
—N/a	3	Terence Crawford	38–0 (29 KO)	Welterweight	WBO
—N/a	4	Naoya Inoue	22–0 (19 KO)	Bantamweight	WBA (Super), IBF, and The Ring
+1	5	Errol Spence Jr.	27–0 (21 KO)	Welterweight	WBC and IBF
+1	6	Juan Francisco Estrada	42–3 (28 KO)	Super flyweight	WBA (Super) and The Ring
+1	7	Vasiliy Lomachenko	16–2 (11 KO)	Lightweight	—N/a
-3	8	Josh Taylor	19–0 (13 KO)	Light welterweight	WBA (Super), WBC, IBF, WBO, and The Ring
New	9	Román González	51–3 (41 KO)	Super flyweight	—N/a
-1	10	Kazuto Ioka	28–2 (15 KO)	Super flyweight	WBO

== 2021 ==
November 27, 2021
Changes	Rank	Boxer	Record	Weight class	Title(s)
—N/a	1	Canelo Álvarez	57–1–2 (39 KO)	Super middleweight	WBA (Super), WBC, IBF, WBO, and The Ring
—N/a	2	Oleksandr Usyk	19–0 (13 KO)	Heavyweight	WBA (Super), IBF, and WBO
—N/a	3	Terence Crawford	38–0 (29 KO)	Welterweight	WBO
—N/a	4	Naoya Inoue	22–0 (19 KO)	Bantamweight	WBA (Super), IBF, and The Ring
—N/a	5	Josh Taylor	18–0 (13 KO)	Light welterweight	WBA (Super), WBC, IBF, WBO, and The Ring
—N/a	6	Errol Spence Jr.	27–0 (21 KO)	Welterweight	WBC and IBF
+1	7	Juan Francisco Estrada	42–3 (28 KO)	Super flyweight	WBA (Super) and The Ring
+1	8	Vasiliy Lomachenko	16–2 (11 KO)	Lightweight	—N/a
+1	9	Kazuto Ioka	27–2 (15 KO)	Super flyweight	WBO
New	10	Tyson Fury	31–0–1 (22 KO)	Heavyweight	WBC and The Ring

November 13, 2021
Changes	Rank	Boxer	Record	Weight class	Title(s)
—N/a	1	Canelo Álvarez	57–1–2 (39 KO)	Super middleweight	WBA (Super), WBC, IBF, WBO, and The Ring
—N/a	2	Oleksandr Usyk	19–0 (13 KO)	Heavyweight	WBA (Super), IBF, and WBO
+1	3	Terence Crawford	38–0 (29 KO)	Welterweight	WBO
-1	4	Naoya Inoue	22–0 (19 KO)	Bantamweight	WBA (Super), IBF, and The Ring
—N/a	5	Josh Taylor	18–0 (13 KO)	Light welterweight	WBA (Super), WBC, IBF, WBO, and The Ring
—N/a	6	Errol Spence Jr.	27–0 (21 KO)	Welterweight	WBC and IBF
—N/a	7	Teófimo López	16–0 (12 KO)	Lightweight	WBA (Super), IBF, WBO, and The Ring
—N/a	8	Juan Francisco Estrada	42–3 (28 KO)	Super flyweight	WBA (Super) and The Ring
—N/a	9	Vasiliy Lomachenko	15–2 (11 KO)	Lightweight	—N/a
—N/a	10	Kazuto Ioka	27–2 (15 KO)	Super flyweight	WBO

September 25, 2021
Changes	Rank	Boxer	Record	Weight class	Title(s)
—N/a	1	Canelo Álvarez	56–1–2 (38 KO)	Super middleweight	WBA (Super), WBC, WBO, and The Ring
+2	2	Oleksandr Usyk	19–0 (13 KO)	Heavyweight	WBA (Super), IBF, and WBO
-1	3	Naoya Inoue	21–0 (18 KO)	Bantamweight	WBA (Super), IBF, and The Ring
-1	4	Terence Crawford	37–0 (28 KO)	Welterweight	WBO
—N/a	5	Josh Taylor	18–0 (13 KO)	Light welterweight	WBA (Super), WBC, IBF, WBO, and The Ring
—N/a	6	Errol Spence Jr.	27–0 (21 KO)	Welterweight	WBC and IBF
—N/a	7	Teófimo López	16–0 (12 KO)	Lightweight	WBA (Super), IBF, WBO, and The Ring
—N/a	8	Juan Francisco Estrada	42–3 (28 KO)	Super flyweight	WBA (Super) and The Ring
—N/a	9	Vasiliy Lomachenko	15–2 (11 KO)	Lightweight	—N/a
—N/a	10	Kazuto Ioka	27–2 (15 KO)	Super flyweight	WBO

May 26, 2021
Changes	Rank	Boxer	Record	Weight class	Title(s)
—N/a	1	Canelo Álvarez	56–1–2 (38 KO)	Super middleweight	WBA (Super), WBC, WBO, and The Ring
—N/a	2	Naoya Inoue	20–0 (17 KO)	Bantamweight	WBA (Super), IBF, and The Ring
—N/a	3	Terence Crawford	37–0 (28 KO)	Welterweight	WBO
—N/a	4	Oleksandr Usyk	18–0 (13 KO)	Heavyweight	—N/a
+4	5	Josh Taylor	18–0 (13 KO)	Light welterweight	WBA (Super), WBC, IBF, WBO, and The Ring
-1	6	Errol Spence Jr.	27–0 (21 KO)	Welterweight	WBC and IBF
-1	7	Teófimo López	16–0 (12 KO)	Lightweight	WBA (Super), IBF, WBO, and The Ring
—N/a	8	Juan Francisco Estrada	42–3 (28 KO)	Super flyweight	WBA (Super) and The Ring
-2	9	Vasiliy Lomachenko	14–2 (10 KO)	Lightweight	—N/a
—N/a	10	Kazuto Ioka	26–2 (15 KO)	Super flyweight	WBO

January 2, 2021
Changes	Rank	Boxer	Record	Weight class	Title(s)
—N/a	1	Canelo Álvarez	54–1–2 (36 KO)	Super middleweight	WBA (Super), WBC and The Ring
—N/a	2	Naoya Inoue	20–0 (17 KO)	Bantamweight	WBA (Super), IBF, and The Ring
—N/a	3	Terence Crawford	37–0 (28 KO)	Welterweight	WBO
—N/a	4	Oleksandr Usyk	18–0 (13 KO)	Heavyweight	—N/a
—N/a	5	Errol Spence Jr.	26–0 (21 KO)	Welterweight	WBC and IBF
—N/a	6	Teófimo López	16–0 (12 KO)	Lightweight	WBA (Super), IBF, WBO, and The Ring
—N/a	7	Vasiliy Lomachenko	14–2 (10 KO)	Lightweight	—N/a
—N/a	8	Juan Francisco Estrada	41–3 (28 KO)	Super flyweight	WBC and The Ring
—N/a	9	Josh Taylor	17–0 (13 KO)	Light welterweight	WBA (Super), IBF, and The Ring
New	10	Kazuto Ioka	26–2 (15 KO)	Super flyweight	WBO

== 2020 ==
November 5, 2020
Changes	Rank	Boxer	Record	Weight class	Title(s)
—N/a	1	Canelo Álvarez	53–1–2 (36 KO)	Middleweight	WBA (Super) and The Ring
—N/a	2	Naoya Inoue	20–0 (17 KO)	Bantamweight	WBA (Super), IBF, and The Ring
—N/a	3	Terence Crawford	37–0 (28 KO)	Welterweight	WBO
—N/a	4	Oleksandr Usyk	18–0 (13 KO)	Heavyweight	—N/a
—N/a	5	Errol Spence Jr.	26–0 (21 KO)	Welterweight	WBC and IBF
—N/a	6	Teófimo López	16–0 (12 KO)	Lightweight	WBA (Super), IBF, WBO, and The Ring
—N/a	7	Vasiliy Lomachenko	14–2 (10 KO)	Lightweight	—N/a
—N/a	8	Juan Francisco Estrada	41–3 (28 KO)	Super flyweight	WBC and The Ring
New	9	Josh Taylor	17–0 (13 KO)	Light welterweight	WBA (Super), IBF, and The Ring
-1	10	Gennady Golovkin	40–1–1 (35 KO)	Middleweight	IBF

October 17, 2020
Changes	Rank	Boxer	Record	Weight class	Title(s)
—N/a	1	Canelo Álvarez	53–1–2 (36 KO)	Middleweight	WBA (Super) and The Ring
+1	2	Naoya Inoue	19–0 (16 KO)	Bantamweight	WBA (Super), IBF, and The Ring
+1	3	Terence Crawford	36–0 (27 KO)	Welterweight	WBO
+1	4	Oleksandr Usyk	17–0 (13 KO)	Heavyweight	—N/a
+1	5	Errol Spence Jr.	26–0 (21 KO)	Welterweight	WBC and IBF
New	6	Teófimo López	16–0 (12 KO)	Lightweight	WBA (Super), IBF, WBO, and The Ring
-5	7	Vasiliy Lomachenko	14–2 (10 KO)	Lightweight	—N/a
—N/a	8	Juan Francisco Estrada	41–3 (28 KO)	Super flyweight	WBC and The Ring
-2	9	Gennady Golovkin	40–1–1 (35 KO)	Middleweight	IBF
-1	10	Artur Beterbiev	15–0 (15 KO)	Light heavyweight	WBC and IBF

== See also ==
- List of The Ring pound for pound rankings
- List of The Ring pound for pound rankings (1990s)
- List of The Ring pound for pound rankings (2000s)
- List of The Ring pound for pound rankings (2010s)
- List of fights between two The Ring pound for pound boxers
- Boxing pound for pound rankings
- The Ring
- List of current world boxing champions
- List of undisputed boxing champions
- List of WBA world champions
- List of WBC world champions
- List of IBF world champions
- List of WBO world champions
- List of The Ring world champions
