= List of The Ring pound for pound rankings (1990s) =

Boxing magazine The Ring began naming the top 10 pound for pound boxers in 1989. The first #1 pound for pound fighter was heavyweight champion Mike Tyson. To reduce the number of tables, a table is only added if there are changes in the rankings. For WBA titles, only titles in the primary champion lineage are listed.

== 1999 ==
October 31, 1999
Changes	Rank	Boxer	Record	Weight class	Title(s)
—N/a	1	Roy Jones Jr.	40–1 (33 KO)	Light heavyweight	WBA, WBC, and IBF
—N/a	2	Floyd Mayweather Jr.	22–0 (17 KO)	Super featherweight	WBC
—N/a	3	Felix Trinidad	36–0 (30 KO)	Welterweight	WBC and IBF
—N/a	4	Oscar De La Hoya	31–1 (25 KO)	Welterweight	—N/a
—N/a	5	Shane Mosley	33–0 (31 KO)	Welterweight	—N/a
—N/a	6	Mark Johnson	38–1 (25 KO)	Super flyweight	IBF
—N/a	7	Ricardo López	49–0–1 (35 KO)	Light flyweight	IBF
—N/a	8	Erik Morales	35–0 (28 KO)	Super bantamweight	WBC
+1	9	Bernard Hopkins	35–2–1–1 (27 KO)	Middleweight	IBF
New	10	Stevie Johnston	28–1 (14 KO)	Lightweight	WBC

October 5, 1999
Changes	Rank	Boxer	Record	Weight class	Title(s)
+1	1	Roy Jones Jr.	40–1 (33 KO)	Light heavyweight	WBA, WBC, and IBF
+3	2	Floyd Mayweather Jr.	22–0 (17 KO)	Super featherweight	WBC
—N/a	3	Felix Trinidad	36–0 (30 KO)	Welterweight	WBC and IBF
-3	4	Oscar De La Hoya	31–1 (25 KO)	Welterweight	—N/a
-1	5	Shane Mosley	33–0 (31 KO)	Welterweight	—N/a
-1	6	Mark Johnson	38–1 (25 KO)	Super flyweight	IBF
—N/a	7	Ricardo López	49–0–1 (35 KO)	Light flyweight	IBF
—N/a	8	Erik Morales	34–0 (28 KO)	Super bantamweight	WBC
—N/a	9	Naseem Hamed	32–0 (29 KO)	Featherweight	WBO
—N/a	10	Bernard Hopkins	35–2–1–1 (27 KO)	Middleweight	IBF

September 13, 1999
Changes	Rank	Boxer	Record	Weight class	Title(s)
—N/a	1	Oscar De La Hoya	31–0 (25 KO)	Welterweight	WBC
—N/a	2	Roy Jones Jr.	40–1 (33 KO)	Light heavyweight	WBA, WBC, and IBF
—N/a	3	Felix Trinidad	35–0 (30 KO)	Welterweight	IBF
—N/a	4	Shane Mosley	32–0 (30 KO)	Welterweight	—N/a
+1	5	Floyd Mayweather Jr.	22–0 (17 KO)	Super featherweight	WBC
-1	6	Mark Johnson	38–1 (25 KO)	Super flyweight	IBF
—N/a	7	Ricardo López	48–0–1 (35 KO)	Mini flyweight	WBA and WBC
—N/a	8	Erik Morales	34–0 (28 KO)	Super bantamweight	WBC
—N/a	9	Naseem Hamed	32–0 (29 KO)	Featherweight	WBO
—N/a	10	Bernard Hopkins	35–2–1–1 (27 KO)	Middleweight	IBF

August 10, 1999
Changes	Rank	Boxer	Record	Weight class	Title(s)
—N/a	1	Oscar De La Hoya	31–0 (25 KO)	Welterweight	WBC
—N/a	2	Roy Jones Jr.	40–1 (33 KO)	Light heavyweight	WBA, WBC, and IBF
—N/a	3	Felix Trinidad	35–0 (30 KO)	Welterweight	IBF
—N/a	4	Shane Mosley	32–0 (30 KO)	Welterweight	—N/a
—N/a	5	Mark Johnson	37–1 (25 KO)	Super flyweight	IBF
—N/a	6	Floyd Mayweather Jr.	21–0 (16 KO)	Super featherweight	WBC
—N/a	7	Ricardo López	48–0–1 (35 KO)	Mini flyweight	WBA and WBC
+1	8	Erik Morales	34–0 (28 KO)	Super bantamweight	WBC
-1	9	Naseem Hamed	32–0 (29 KO)	Featherweight	WBO
—N/a	10	Bernard Hopkins	35–2–1–1 (27 KO)	Middleweight	IBF

July 13, 1999
Changes	Rank	Boxer	Record	Weight class	Title(s)
—N/a	1	Oscar De La Hoya	31–0 (25 KO)	Welterweight	WBC
—N/a	2	Roy Jones Jr.	40–1 (33 KO)	Light heavyweight	WBA, WBC, and IBF
—N/a	3	Felix Trinidad	35–0 (30 KO)	Welterweight	IBF
—N/a	4	Shane Mosley	32–0 (30 KO)	Welterweight	—N/a
—N/a	5	Mark Johnson	37–1 (25 KO)	Super flyweight	IBF
+1	6	Floyd Mayweather Jr.	21–0 (16 KO)	Super featherweight	WBC
-1	7	Ricardo López	48–0–1 (35 KO)	Mini flyweight	WBA and WBC
—N/a	8	Naseem Hamed	32–0 (29 KO)	Featherweight	WBO
New	9	Erik Morales	33–0 (27 KO)	Super bantamweight	WBC
New	10	Bernard Hopkins	35–2–1–1 (27 KO)	Middleweight	IBF

March 22, 1999
Changes	Rank	Boxer	Record	Weight class	Title(s)
—N/a	1	Oscar De La Hoya	30–0 (24 KO)	Welterweight	WBC
—N/a	2	Roy Jones Jr.	39–1 (33 KO)	Light heavyweight	WBA and WBC
+1	3	Felix Trinidad	34–0 (29 KO)	Welterweight	IBF
+2	4	Shane Mosley	31–0 (29 KO)	Lightweight	IBF
—N/a	5	Mark Johnson	36–1 (25 KO)	Flyweight	IBF
+1	6	Ricardo López	48–0–1 (35 KO)	Mini flyweight	WBA and WBC
+1	7	Floyd Mayweather Jr.	20–0 (15 KO)	Super featherweight	WBC
+1	8	Naseem Hamed	31–0 (28 KO)	Featherweight	WBO
+1	9	Johnny Tapia	45–0–2 (25 KO)	Bantamweight	WBA
New	10	Lennox Lewis	34–1–1 (27 KO)	Heavyweight	WBC

January 3, 1999
Changes	Rank	Boxer	Record	Weight class	Title(s)
—N/a	1	Oscar De La Hoya	29–0 (24 KO)	Welterweight	WBC
—N/a	2	Roy Jones Jr.	38–1 (32 KO)	Light heavyweight	WBA and WBC
—N/a	3	Evander Holyfield	36–3 (25 KO)	Heavyweight	WBA and IBF
—N/a	4	Felix Trinidad	33–0 (29 KO)	Welterweight	IBF
—N/a	5	Mark Johnson	36–1 (25 KO)	Flyweight	IBF
+2	6	Shane Mosley	30–0 (28 KO)	Lightweight	IBF
+2	7	Ricardo López	48–0–1 (35 KO)	Mini flyweight	WBA and WBC
New	8	Floyd Mayweather Jr.	19–0 (15 KO)	Super featherweight	WBC
-3	9	Naseem Hamed	31–0 (28 KO)	Featherweight	WBO
-3	10	Johnny Tapia	45–0–2 (25 KO)	Bantamweight	WBA

== 1998 ==
November 29, 1998
Changes	Rank	Boxer	Record	Weight class	Title(s)
—N/a	1	Oscar De La Hoya	29–0 (24 KO)	Welterweight	WBC
—N/a	2	Roy Jones Jr.	38–1 (32 KO)	Light heavyweight	WBA and WBC
—N/a	3	Evander Holyfield	36–3 (25 KO)	Heavyweight	WBA and IBF
—N/a	4	Felix Trinidad	33–0 (29 KO)	Welterweight	IBF
—N/a	5	Mark Johnson	36–1 (25 KO)	Flyweight	IBF
+1	6	Naseem Hamed	31–0 (28 KO)	Featherweight	WBO
+1	7	Johnny Tapia	44–0–2 (25 KO)	Super flyweight	IBF and WBO
+1	8	Shane Mosley	30–0 (28 KO)	Lightweight	IBF
+1	9	Ricardo López	48–0–1 (35 KO)	Mini flyweight	WBA and WBC
-4	10	Pernell Whitaker	39–2–1–1 (16 KO)	Welterweight	—N/a

October 7, 1998
Changes	Rank	Boxer	Record	Weight class	Title(s)
—N/a	1	Oscar De La Hoya	28–0 (23 KO)	Welterweight	WBC
—N/a	2	Roy Jones Jr.	37–1 (31 KO)	Light heavyweight	WBA and WBC
—N/a	3	Evander Holyfield	36–3 (25 KO)	Heavyweight	WBA and IBF
—N/a	4	Felix Trinidad	33–0 (29 KO)	Welterweight	IBF
—N/a	5	Mark Johnson	36–1 (25 KO)	Flyweight	IBF
—N/a	6	Pernell Whitaker	39–2–1–1 (16 KO)	Welterweight	—N/a
—N/a	7	Naseem Hamed	30–0 (28 KO)	Featherweight	WBO
—N/a	8	Johnny Tapia	44–0–2 (25 KO)	Super flyweight	IBF and WBO
New	9	Shane Mosley	29–0 (27 KO)	Lightweight	IBF
-1	10	Ricardo López	47–0–1 (35 KO)	Mini flyweight	WBC

June 18, 1998
Changes	Rank	Boxer	Record	Weight class	Title(s)
—N/a	1	Oscar De La Hoya	28–0 (23 KO)	Welterweight	WBC
—N/a	2	Roy Jones Jr.	36–1 (31 KO)	Light heavyweight	WBC
—N/a	3	Evander Holyfield	35–3 (25 KO)	Heavyweight	WBA and IBF
—N/a	4	Felix Trinidad	33–0 (29 KO)	Welterweight	IBF
+1	5	Mark Johnson	34–1 (24 KO)	Flyweight	IBF
-1	6	Pernell Whitaker	39–2–1–1 (16 KO)	Welterweight	—N/a
—N/a	7	Naseem Hamed	30–0 (28 KO)	Featherweight	WBO
—N/a	8	Johnny Tapia	43–0–2 (25 KO)	Super flyweight	IBF and WBO
—N/a	9	Ricardo López	47–0–1 (35 KO)	Mini flyweight	WBC
—N/a	10	Bernard Hopkins	34–2–1 (26 KO)	Middleweight	IBF

March 26, 1998
Changes	Rank	Boxer	Record	Weight class	Title(s)
—N/a	1	Oscar De La Hoya	27–0 (22 KO)	Welterweight	WBC
—N/a	2	Roy Jones Jr.	35–1 (30 KO)	Light heavyweight	—N/a
+1	3	Evander Holyfield	35–3 (25 KO)	Heavyweight	WBA and IBF
-1	4	Felix Trinidad	32–0 (28 KO)	Welterweight	IBF
—N/a	5	Pernell Whitaker	39–2–1–1 (16 KO)	Welterweight	—N/a
+3	6	Mark Johnson	34–1 (24 KO)	Flyweight	IBF
—N/a	7	Naseem Hamed	29–0 (27 KO)	Featherweight	WBO
—N/a	8	Johnny Tapia	43–0–2 (25 KO)	Super flyweight	IBF and WBO
-3	9	Ricardo López	47–0–1 (35 KO)	Mini flyweight	WBC
—N/a	10	Bernard Hopkins	34–2–1 (26 KO)	Middleweight	IBF

January 9, 1998
Changes	Rank	Boxer	Record	Weight class	Title(s)
—N/a	1	Oscar De La Hoya	27–0 (22 KO)	Welterweight	WBC
—N/a	2	Roy Jones Jr.	35–1 (30 KO)	Light heavyweight	—N/a
+1	3	Felix Trinidad	32–0 (28 KO)	Welterweight	IBF
+1	4	Evander Holyfield	35–3 (25 KO)	Heavyweight	WBA and IBF
-2	5	Pernell Whitaker	39–2–1–1 (16 KO)	Welterweight	—N/a
—N/a	6	Ricardo López	47–0 (35 KO)	Mini flyweight	WBC
+1	7	Naseem Hamed	29–0 (27 KO)	Featherweight	WBO
+1	8	Johnny Tapia	42–0–2 (25 KO)	Super flyweight	IBF and WBO
+1	9	Mark Johnson	33–1 (23 KO)	Flyweight	IBF
New	10	Bernard Hopkins	33–2–1 (25 KO)	Middleweight	IBF

== 1997 ==
November 5, 1997
Changes	Rank	Boxer	Record	Weight class	Title(s)
—N/a	1	Oscar De La Hoya	26–0 (21 KO)	Welterweight	WBC
—N/a	2	Roy Jones Jr.	35–1 (30 KO)	Light heavyweight	WBC
—N/a	3	Pernell Whitaker	39–2–1–1 (16 KO)	Welterweight	—N/a
—N/a	4	Felix Trinidad	32–0 (28 KO)	Welterweight	IBF
+3	5	Evander Holyfield	35–3 (25 KO)	Heavyweight	WBA and IBF
-1	6	Ricardo López	47–0 (35 KO)	Mini flyweight	WBC
-1	7	Junior Jones	44–2 (26 KO)	Super bantamweight	WBO
New	8	Naseem Hamed	28–0 (26 KO)	Featherweight	WBO
—N/a	9	Johnny Tapia	41–0–2 (25 KO)	Super flyweight	IBF and WBO
—N/a	10	Mark Johnson	33–1 (23 KO)	Flyweight	IBF

August 1, 1997
Changes	Rank	Boxer	Record	Weight class	Title(s)
—N/a	1	Oscar De La Hoya	25–0 (21 KO)	Welterweight	WBC
—N/a	2	Roy Jones Jr.	34–1 (29 KO)	Light heavyweight	—N/a
—N/a	3	Pernell Whitaker	39–2–1 (16 KO)	Welterweight	—N/a
—N/a	4	Felix Trinidad	31–0 (27 KO)	Welterweight	IBF
—N/a	5	Ricardo López	46–0 (34 KO)	Mini flyweight	WBC
—N/a	6	Junior Jones	44–2 (26 KO)	Super bantamweight	WBO
—N/a	7	Terry Norris	45–6 (30 KO)	Light middleweight	WBC
—N/a	8	Evander Holyfield	34–3 (24 KO)	Heavyweight	WBA
New	9	Johnny Tapia	41–0–2 (25 KO)	Super flyweight	IBF and WBO
-1	10	Mark Johnson	32–1 (23 KO)	Flyweight	IBF

June 4, 1997
Changes	Rank	Boxer	Record	Weight class	Title(s)
—N/a	1	Oscar De La Hoya	24–0 (20 KO)	Welterweight	WBC
—N/a	2	Roy Jones Jr.	34–1 (29 KO)	Light heavyweight	—N/a
—N/a	3	Pernell Whitaker	39–2–1 (16 KO)	Welterweight	—N/a
—N/a	4	Felix Trinidad	31–0 (27 KO)	Welterweight	IBF
—N/a	5	Ricardo López	46–0 (34 KO)	Mini flyweight	WBC
—N/a	6	Junior Jones	44–2 (26 KO)	Super bantamweight	WBO
+1	7	Terry Norris	45–6 (30 KO)	Light middleweight	WBC
+1	8	Evander Holyfield	33–3 (24 KO)	Heavyweight	WBA
+1	9	Mark Johnson	32–1 (23 KO)	Flyweight	IBF
New	10	Ike Quartey	34–0 (29 KO)	Welterweight	WBA

April 17, 1997
Changes	Rank	Boxer	Record	Weight class	Title(s)
+1	1	Oscar De La Hoya	24–0 (20 KO)	Light welterweight Welterweight	WBC WBC
-1	2	Roy Jones Jr.	34–1 (29 KO)	Light heavyweight	—N/a
—N/a	3	Pernell Whitaker	39–2–1 (16 KO)	Welterweight	—N/a
—N/a	4	Felix Trinidad	31–0 (27 KO)	Welterweight	IBF
—N/a	5	Ricardo López	46–0 (34 KO)	Mini flyweight	WBC
—N/a	6	Junior Jones	43–2 (26 KO)	Super bantamweight	WBO
—N/a	7	Kostya Tszyu	18–0–0–1 (14 KO)	Light welterweight	IBF
—N/a	8	Terry Norris	45–6 (30 KO)	Light middleweight	WBC
—N/a	9	Evander Holyfield	33–3 (24 KO)	Heavyweight	WBA
—N/a	10	Mark Johnson	31–1 (22 KO)	Flyweight	IBF

== 1996 ==
December 5, 1996
Changes	Rank	Boxer	Record	Weight class	Title(s)
—N/a	1	Roy Jones Jr.	34–0 (29 KO)	Super middleweight Light heavyweight	IBF —
—N/a	2	Oscar De La Hoya	22–0 (20 KO)	Light welterweight	WBC
—N/a	3	Pernell Whitaker	39–1–1 (16 KO)	Welterweight	WBC
—N/a	4	Felix Trinidad	30–0 (26 KO)	Welterweight	IBF
+1	5	Ricardo López	44–0 (33 KO)	Mini flyweight	WBC
New	6	Junior Jones	43–2 (26 KO)	Super bantamweight	WBO
—N/a	7	Kostya Tszyu	18–0 (14 KO)	Light welterweight	IBF
—N/a	8	Terry Norris	44–6 (29 KO)	Light middleweight	WBC and IBF
—N/a	9	Evander Holyfield	33–3 (24 KO)	Heavyweight	WBA
—N/a	10	Mark Johnson	30–1 (22 KO)	Flyweight	IBF

November 10, 1996
Changes	Rank	Boxer	Record	Weight class	Title(s)
—N/a	1	Roy Jones Jr.	33–0 (29 KO)	Super middleweight	IBF
—N/a	2	Oscar De La Hoya	22–0 (20 KO)	Light welterweight	WBC
—N/a	3	Pernell Whitaker	39–1–1 (16 KO)	Welterweight	WBC
—N/a	4	Felix Trinidad	30–0 (26 KO)	Welterweight	IBF
—N/a	5	Marco Antonio Barrera	43–0 (31 KO)	Super bantamweight	WBO
—N/a	6	Ricardo López	44–0 (33 KO)	Mini flyweight	WBC
—N/a	7	Kostya Tszyu	18–0 (14 KO)	Light welterweight	IBF
—N/a	8	Terry Norris	44–6 (29 KO)	Light middleweight	WBC and IBF
New	9	Evander Holyfield	33–3 (24 KO)	Heavyweight	WBA
—N/a	10	Mark Johnson	30–1 (22 KO)	Flyweight	IBF

July 18, 1996
Changes	Rank	Boxer	Record	Weight class	Title(s)
—N/a	1	Roy Jones Jr.	32–0 (28 KO)	Super middleweight	IBF
—N/a	2	Oscar De La Hoya	22–0 (20 KO)	Light welterweight	WBC
—N/a	3	Pernell Whitaker	38–1–1 (16 KO)	Welterweight	WBC
—N/a	4	Felix Trinidad	29–0 (25 KO)	Welterweight	IBF
—N/a	5	Marco Antonio Barrera	42–0 (30 KO)	Super bantamweight	WBO
—N/a	6	Ricardo López	43–0 (32 KO)	Mini flyweight	WBC
—N/a	7	Kostya Tszyu	17–0 (13 KO)	Light welterweight	IBF
+1	8	Terry Norris	43–6 (28 KO)	Light middleweight	WBC and IBF
+1	9	Mike Tyson	44–1 (38 KO)	Heavyweight	WBC
New	10	Mark Johnson	29–1 (22 KO)	Flyweight	IBF

June 12, 1996
Changes	Rank	Boxer	Record	Weight class	Title(s)
—N/a	1	Roy Jones Jr.	31–0 (27 KO)	Super middleweight	IBF
+1	2	Oscar De La Hoya	22–0 (20 KO)	Light welterweight	WBC
-1	3	Pernell Whitaker	38–1–1 (16 KO)	Welterweight	WBC
—N/a	4	Felix Trinidad	29–0 (25 KO)	Welterweight	IBF
—N/a	5	Marco Antonio Barrera	41–0 (29 KO)	Super bantamweight	WBO
—N/a	6	Ricardo López	42–0 (31 KO)	Mini flyweight	WBC
—N/a	7	Kostya Tszyu	17–0 (13 KO)	Light welterweight	IBF
—N/a	8	Riddick Bowe	38–1–0–1 (32 KO)	Heavyweight	—N/a
—N/a	9	Terry Norris	43–6 (28 KO)	Light middleweight	WBC and IBF
—N/a	10	Mike Tyson	44–1 (38 KO)	Heavyweight	WBC

April 18, 1996
Changes	Rank	Boxer	Record	Weight class	Title(s)
+1	1	Roy Jones Jr.	31–0 (27 KO)	Super middleweight	IBF
-1	2	Pernell Whitaker	38–1–1 (16 KO)	Welterweight	WBC
—N/a	3	Oscar De La Hoya	21–0 (19 KO)	Light welterweight	—N/a
—N/a	4	Felix Trinidad	28–0 (24 KO)	Welterweight	IBF
—N/a	5	Marco Antonio Barrera	40–0 (28 KO)	Super bantamweight	WBO
—N/a	6	Ricardo López	42–0 (31 KO)	Mini flyweight	WBC
—N/a	7	Kostya Tszyu	16–0 (12 KO)	Light welterweight	IBF
—N/a	8	Riddick Bowe	38–1–0–1 (32 KO)	Heavyweight	WBO
—N/a	9	Terry Norris	43–6 (28 KO)	Light middleweight	WBC and IBF
—N/a	10	Mike Tyson	44–1 (38 KO)	Heavyweight	WBC

March 20, 1996
Changes	Rank	Boxer	Record	Weight class	Title(s)
—N/a	1	Pernell Whitaker	37–1–1 (16 KO)	Welterweight	WBC
—N/a	2	Roy Jones Jr.	31–0 (27 KO)	Super middleweight	IBF
+1	3	Oscar De La Hoya	21–0 (19 KO)	Light welterweight	—N/a
+1	4	Felix Trinidad	28–0 (24 KO)	Welterweight	IBF
+4	5	Marco Antonio Barrera	40–0 (28 KO)	Super bantamweight	WBO
-3	6	Ricardo López	42–0 (31 KO)	Mini flyweight	WBC
—N/a	7	Kostya Tszyu	16–0 (12 KO)	Light welterweight	IBF
—N/a	8	Riddick Bowe	38–1–0–1 (32 KO)	Heavyweight	WBO
+1	9	Terry Norris	43–6 (28 KO)	Light middleweight	WBC and IBF
New	10	Mike Tyson	44–1 (38 KO)	Heavyweight	WBC

January 10, 1996
Changes	Rank	Boxer	Record	Weight class	Title(s)
—N/a	1	Pernell Whitaker	37–1–1 (16 KO)	Welterweight	WBC
—N/a	2	Roy Jones Jr.	30–0 (26 KO)	Super middleweight	IBF
—N/a	3	Ricardo López	41–0 (30 KO)	Mini flyweight	WBC
—N/a	4	Oscar De La Hoya	20–0 (18 KO)	Lightweight	WBO
—N/a	5	Felix Trinidad	27–0 (23 KO)	Welterweight	IBF
+1	6	Yuri Arbachakov	21–0 (15 KO)	Flyweight	WBC
+1	7	Kostya Tszyu	15–0 (11 KO)	Light welterweight	IBF
+2	8	Riddick Bowe	38–1–0–1 (32 KO)	Heavyweight	WBO
—N/a	9	Marco Antonio Barrera	39–0 (27 KO)	Super bantamweight	WBO
New	10	Terry Norris	41–6 (25 KO)	Light middleweight	WBC and IBF

== 1995 ==
November 8, 1995
Changes	Rank	Boxer	Record	Weight class	Title(s)
—N/a	1	Pernell Whitaker	36–1–1 (15 KO)	Welterweight	WBC
—N/a	2	Roy Jones Jr.	30–0 (26 KO)	Super middleweight	IBF
—N/a	3	Ricardo López	41–0 (30 KO)	Mini flyweight	WBC
—N/a	4	Oscar De La Hoya	19–0 (17 KO)	Lightweight	WBO
—N/a	5	Felix Trinidad	26–0 (22 KO)	Welterweight	IBF
—N/a	6	Frankie Randall	52–3–1 (40 KO)	Light welterweight	WBA
—N/a	7	Yuri Arbachakov	21–0 (15 KO)	Flyweight	WBC
—N/a	8	Kostya Tszyu	15–0 (11 KO)	Light welterweight	IBF
+1	9	Marco Antonio Barrera	39–0 (27 KO)	Super bantamweight	WBO
-1	10	Riddick Bowe	38–1–0–1 (32 KO)	Heavyweight	WBO

September 1, 1995
Changes	Rank	Boxer	Record	Weight class	Title(s)
—N/a	1	Pernell Whitaker	36–1–1 (15 KO)	Welterweight	WBC
—N/a	2	Roy Jones Jr.	29–0 (25 KO)	Super middleweight	IBF
—N/a	3	Ricardo López	41–0 (30 KO)	Mini flyweight	WBC
—N/a	4	Oscar De La Hoya	18–0 (16 KO)	Lightweight	WBO
—N/a	5	Felix Trinidad	26–0 (22 KO)	Welterweight	IBF
—N/a	6	Frankie Randall	52–3–1 (40 KO)	Light welterweight	WBA
—N/a	7	Yuri Arbachakov	20–0 (15 KO)	Flyweight	WBC
—N/a	8	Kostya Tszyu	15–0 (11 KO)	Light welterweight	IBF
—N/a	9	Riddick Bowe	37–1–0–1 (31 KO)	Heavyweight	WBO
New	10	Marco Antonio Barrera	38–0 (26 KO)	Super bantamweight	WBO

August 10, 1995
Changes	Rank	Boxer	Record	Weight class	Title(s)
—N/a	1	Pernell Whitaker	35–1–1 (15 KO)	Welterweight	WBC
—N/a	2	Roy Jones Jr.	29–0 (25 KO)	Super middleweight	IBF
—N/a	3	Ricardo López	41–0 (30 KO)	Mini flyweight	WBC
+1	4	Oscar De La Hoya	18–0 (16 KO)	Lightweight	WBO
+1	5	Felix Trinidad	26–0 (22 KO)	Welterweight	IBF
+1	6	Frankie Randall	52–3–1 (40 KO)	Light welterweight	WBA
+1	7	Yuri Arbachakov	20–0 (15 KO)	Flyweight	WBC
+1	8	Kostya Tszyu	15–0 (11 KO)	Light welterweight	IBF
+1	9	Riddick Bowe	37–1–0–1 (31 KO)	Heavyweight	WBO
New	10	Miguel Ángel González	37–0 (29 KO)	Lightweight	WBC

July 14, 1995
Changes	Rank	Boxer	Record	Weight class	Title(s)
—N/a	1	Pernell Whitaker	35–1–1 (15 KO)	Welterweight	WBC
—N/a	2	Roy Jones Jr.	29–0 (25 KO)	Super middleweight	IBF
—N/a	3	Ricardo López	41–0 (30 KO)	Mini flyweight	WBC
—N/a	4	Humberto González	43–2 (31 KO)	Light flyweight	WBC and IBF
—N/a	5	Oscar De La Hoya	18–0 (16 KO)	Lightweight	WBO
—N/a	6	Felix Trinidad	26–0 (22 KO)	Welterweight	IBF
—N/a	7	Frankie Randall	52–3–1 (40 KO)	Light welterweight	WBA
—N/a	8	Yuri Arbachakov	20–0 (15 KO)	Flyweight	WBC
—N/a	9	Kostya Tszyu	15–0 (11 KO)	Light welterweight	IBF
New	10	Riddick Bowe	37–1–0–1 (31 KO)	Heavyweight	WBO

May 18, 1995
Changes	Rank	Boxer	Record	Weight class	Title(s)
—N/a	1	Pernell Whitaker	35–1–1 (15 KO)	Welterweight	WBC
—N/a	2	Roy Jones Jr.	28–0 (24 KO)	Super middleweight	IBF
—N/a	3	Ricardo López	41–0 (30 KO)	Mini flyweight	WBC
—N/a	4	Humberto González	43–2 (31 KO)	Light flyweight	WBC and IBF
New	5	Oscar De La Hoya	18–0 (16 KO)	Lightweight	IBF and WBO
+1	6	Felix Trinidad	26–0 (22 KO)	Welterweight	IBF
-1	7	Frankie Randall	51–3–1 (40 KO)	Light welterweight	WBA
—N/a	8	Yuri Arbachakov	20–0 (15 KO)	Flyweight	WBC
—N/a	9	Kostya Tszyu	14–0 (11 KO)	Light welterweight	IBF
—N/a	10	Mike McCallum	48–2–1 (36 KO)	Light heavyweight	WBC

March 22, 1995
Changes	Rank	Boxer	Record	Weight class	Title(s)
—N/a	1	Pernell Whitaker	35–1–1 (15 KO)	Welterweight	WBC
—N/a	2	Roy Jones Jr.	28–0 (24 KO)	Super middleweight	IBF
—N/a	3	Ricardo López	40–0 (29 KO)	Mini flyweight	WBC
—N/a	4	Humberto González	42–2 (30 KO)	Light flyweight	WBC and IBF
—N/a	5	Frankie Randall	51–3–1 (40 KO)	Light welterweight	WBA
—N/a	6	Felix Trinidad	25–0 (21 KO)	Welterweight	IBF
+1	7	Miguel Ángel González	35–0 (29 KO)	Lightweight	WBC
+2	8	Yuri Arbachakov	20–0 (15 KO)	Flyweight	WBC
New	9	Kostya Tszyu	14–0 (11 KO)	Light welterweight	IBF
New	10	Mike McCallum	48–2–1 (36 KO)	Light heavyweight	WBC

January 26, 1995
Changes	Rank	Boxer	Record	Weight class	Title(s)
—N/a	1	Pernell Whitaker	34–1–1 (15 KO)	Welterweight	WBC
—N/a	2	Roy Jones Jr.	27–0 (23 KO)	Super middleweight	IBF
+1	3	Ricardo López	40–0 (29 KO)	Mini flyweight	WBC
+1	4	Humberto González	42–2 (30 KO)	Light flyweight	WBC and IBF
+1	5	Frankie Randall	51–3–1 (40 KO)	Light welterweight	WBA
+1	6	Felix Trinidad	25–0 (21 KO)	Welterweight	IBF
+1	7	Gerald McClellan	31–2 (29 KO)	Middleweight	WBC
+1	8	Miguel Ángel González	35–0 (29 KO)	Lightweight	WBC
New	9	James Toney	44–2–2 (29 KO)	Light heavyweight	—N/a
New	10	Yuri Arbachakov	19–0 (15 KO)	Flyweight	WBC

January 1, 1995
Changes	Rank	Boxer	Record	Weight class	Title(s)
—N/a	1	Pernell Whitaker	34–1–1 (15 KO)	Welterweight	WBC
—N/a	2	Roy Jones Jr.	27–0 (23 KO)	Super middleweight	IBF
—N/a	3	Orlando Canizales	38–1–1–1 (28 KO)	Bantamweight	IBF
—N/a	4	Ricardo López	40–0 (29 KO)	Mini flyweight	WBC
—N/a	5	Humberto González	42–2 (30 KO)	Light flyweight	WBC and IBF
+1	6	Frankie Randall	51–3–1 (40 KO)	Light welterweight	WBA
+1	7	Felix Trinidad	25–0 (21 KO)	Welterweight	IBF
-2	8	Gerald McClellan	31–2 (29 KO)	Middleweight	WBC
—N/a	9	Miguel Ángel González	35–0 (29 KO)	Lightweight	WBC
—N/a	10	Kevin Kelley	41–0 (29 KO)	Featherweight	WBC

== 1994 ==
December 1, 1994
Changes	Rank	Boxer	Record	Weight class	Title(s)
—N/a	1	Pernell Whitaker	34–1–1 (15 KO)	Welterweight	WBC
+5	2	Roy Jones Jr.	27–0 (23 KO)	Super middleweight	IBF
—N/a	3	Orlando Canizales	38–1–1–1 (28 KO)	Bantamweight	IBF
—N/a	4	Ricardo López	39–0 (28 KO)	Mini flyweight	WBC
—N/a	5	Humberto González	42–2 (30 KO)	Light flyweight	WBC and IBF
+2	6	Gerald McClellan	31–2 (29 KO)	Middleweight	WBC
+2	7	Frankie Randall	50–3–1 (39 KO)	Light welterweight	WBA
+2	8	Felix Trinidad	24–0 (20 KO)	Welterweight	IBF
New	9	Miguel Ángel González	34–0 (28 KO)	Lightweight	WBC
New	10	Kevin Kelley	41–0 (29 KO)	Featherweight	WBC

October 5, 1994
Changes	Rank	Boxer	Record	Weight class	Title(s)
—N/a	1	Pernell Whitaker	34–1–1 (15 KO)	Welterweight	WBC
—N/a	2	James Toney	44–0–2 (29 KO)	Super middleweight	IBF
—N/a	3	Orlando Canizales	37–1–1–1 (28 KO)	Bantamweight	IBF
—N/a	4	Ricardo López	38–0 (27 KO)	Mini flyweight	WBC
—N/a	5	Humberto González	41–2 (30 KO)	Light flyweight	WBC and IBF
—N/a	6	Michael Carbajal	32–1 (19 KO)	Light flyweight	WBO
—N/a	7	Roy Jones Jr.	26–0 (23 KO)	Middleweight	—N/a
—N/a	8	Gerald McClellan	31–2 (29 KO)	Middleweight	WBC
—N/a	9	Frankie Randall	50–3–1 (39 KO)	Light welterweight	WBA
New	10	Felix Trinidad	24–0 (20 KO)	Welterweight	IBF

September 8, 1994
Changes	Rank	Boxer	Record	Weight class	Title(s)
—N/a	1	Pernell Whitaker	33–1–1 (15 KO)	Welterweight	WBC
—N/a	2	James Toney	44–0–2 (29 KO)	Super middleweight	IBF
—N/a	3	Orlando Canizales	37–1–1–1 (28 KO)	Bantamweight	IBF
—N/a	4	Ricardo López	37–0 (26 KO)	Mini flyweight	WBC
—N/a	5	Humberto González	40–2 (29 KO)	Light flyweight	WBC and IBF
—N/a	6	Michael Carbajal	32–1 (19 KO)	Light flyweight	WBO
+1	7	Roy Jones Jr.	26–0 (23 KO)	Middleweight	—N/a
+1	8	Gerald McClellan	31–2 (29 KO)	Middleweight	WBC
+1	9	Frankie Randall	49–3–1 (39 KO)	Light welterweight	—N/a
New	10	Miguel Ángel González	34–0 (28 KO)	Lightweight	WBC

May 12, 1994
Changes	Rank	Boxer	Record	Weight class	Title(s)
—N/a	1	Pernell Whitaker	33–1–1 (15 KO)	Welterweight	WBC
—N/a	2	James Toney	42–0–2 (28 KO)	Super middleweight	IBF
—N/a	3	Orlando Canizales	36–1–1–1 (27 KO)	Bantamweight	IBF
+1	4	Ricardo López	37–0 (26 KO)	Mini flyweight	WBC
+1	5	Humberto González	39–2 (28 KO)	Light flyweight	WBC and IBF
+1	6	Michael Carbajal	31–1 (19 KO)	Light flyweight	—N/a
+3	7	Kennedy McKinney	27–0–1 (16 KO)	Super bantamweight	IBF
New	8	Roy Jones Jr.	25–0 (22 KO)	Middleweight	IBF
New	9	Gerald McClellan	31–2 (29 KO)	Middleweight	WBC
-2	10	Frankie Randall	49–3–1 (39 KO)	Light welterweight	—N/a

February 25, 1994
Changes	Rank	Boxer	Record	Weight class	Title(s)
—N/a	1	Pernell Whitaker	32–1–1 (15 KO)	Welterweight	WBC
—N/a	2	James Toney	41–0–2 (27 KO)	Super middleweight	IBF
+1	3	Orlando Canizales	35–1–1–1 (26 KO)	Bantamweight	IBF
+1	4	Evander Holyfield	30–1 (22 KO)	Heavyweight	WBA and IBF
+1	5	Ricardo López	36–0 (26 KO)	Mini flyweight	WBC
New	6	Humberto González	39–2 (28 KO)	Light flyweight	WBC and IBF
-4	7	Michael Carbajal	30–1 (18 KO)	Light flyweight	—N/a
-1	8	Frankie Randall	49–2–1 (39 KO)	Light welterweight	WBC
-1	9	Julio César Chávez	89–1–1 (75 KO)	Light welterweight	—N/a
—N/a	10	Kennedy McKinney	26–0–1 (16 KO)	Super bantamweight	IBF

January–February 1994
Changes	Rank	Boxer	Record	Weight class	Title(s)
—N/a	1	Pernell Whitaker	32–1–1 (15 KO)	Welterweight	WBC
+1	2	James Toney	41–0–2 (27 KO)	Super middleweight	IBF
+1	3	Michael Carbajal	30–0 (18 KO)	Light flyweight	WBC and IBF
+1	4	Orlando Canizales	35–1–1–1 (26 KO)	Bantamweight	IBF
+1	5	Evander Holyfield	30–1 (22 KO)	Heavyweight	WBA and IBF
+1	6	Ricardo López	36–0 (26 KO)	Mini flyweight	WBC
New	7	Frankie Randall	49–2–1 (39 KO)	Light welterweight	WBC
-6	8	Julio César Chávez	89–1–1 (75 KO)	Light welterweight	—N/a
-1	9	Roy Jones Jr.	24–0 (21 KO)	Middleweight	IBF
-1	10	Kennedy McKinney	25–0–1 (15 KO)	Super bantamweight	IBF

January 1, 1994
Changes	Rank	Boxer	Record	Weight class	Title(s)
—N/a	1	Pernell Whitaker	32–1–1 (15 KO)	Welterweight	WBC
—N/a	2	Julio César Chávez	89–0–1 (75 KO)	Light welterweight	WBC
+1	3	James Toney	40–0–2 (26 KO)	Super middleweight	IBF
+1	4	Michael Carbajal	30–0 (18 KO)	Light flyweight	WBC and IBF
+1	5	Orlando Canizales	35–1–1–1 (26 KO)	Bantamweight	IBF
+1	6	Evander Holyfield	30–1 (22 KO)	Heavyweight	WBA and IBF
+3	7	Ricardo López	36–0 (26 KO)	Mini flyweight	WBC
—N/a	8	Roy Jones Jr.	24–0 (21 KO)	Middleweight	IBF
—N/a	9	Kennedy McKinney	25–0–1 (15 KO)	Super bantamweight	IBF
New	10	Yuri Arbachakov	17–0 (13 KO)	Flyweight	WBC

== 1993 ==
November 24, 1993
Changes	Rank	Boxer	Record	Weight class	Title(s)
—N/a	1	Pernell Whitaker	32–1–1 (15 KO)	Welterweight	WBC
—N/a	2	Julio César Chávez	88–0–1 (74 KO)	Light welterweight	WBC
—N/a	3	Terry Norris	36–3 (22 KO)	Light middleweight	WBC
—N/a	4	James Toney	40–0–2 (26 KO)	Super middleweight	IBF
—N/a	5	Michael Carbajal	30–0 (18 KO)	Light flyweight	WBC and IBF
—N/a	6	Orlando Canizales	35–1–1–1 (26 KO)	Bantamweight	IBF
New	7	Evander Holyfield	30–1 (22 KO)	Heavyweight	WBA and IBF
—N/a	8	Roy Jones Jr.	23–0 (21 KO)	Middleweight	IBF
—N/a	9	Kennedy McKinney	25–0–1 (15 KO)	Super bantamweight	IBF
—N/a	10	Ricardo López	35–0 (25 KO)	Mini flyweight	WBC

September 15, 1993
Changes	Rank	Boxer	Record	Weight class	Title(s)
+1	1	Pernell Whitaker	32–1–1 (15 KO)	Welterweight	WBC
-1	2	Julio César Chávez	87–0–1 (73 KO)	Light welterweight	WBC
—N/a	3	Terry Norris	36–3 (22 KO)	Light middleweight	WBC
—N/a	4	James Toney	39–0–2 (26 KO)	Super middleweight	IBF
—N/a	5	Michael Carbajal	29–0 (17 KO)	Light flyweight	WBC and IBF
—N/a	6	Orlando Canizales	34–1–1–1 (26 KO)	Bantamweight	IBF
—N/a	7	Riddick Bowe	34–0 (29 KO)	Heavyweight	WBA and IBF
—N/a	8	Roy Jones Jr.	23–0 (21 KO)	Middleweight	IBF
+1	9	Kennedy McKinney	24–0–1 (15 KO)	Super bantamweight	IBF
New	10	Ricardo López	34–0 (24 KO)	Mini flyweight	WBC

August 12, 1993
Changes	Rank	Boxer	Record	Weight class	Title(s)
—N/a	1	Julio César Chávez	87–0 (73 KO)	Light welterweight	WBC
—N/a	2	Pernell Whitaker	32–1 (15 KO)	Welterweight	WBC
—N/a	3	Terry Norris	35–3 (21 KO)	Light middleweight	WBC
+2	4	James Toney	38–0–2 (26 KO)	Super middleweight	IBF
+2	5	Michael Carbajal	29–0 (17 KO)	Light flyweight	WBC and IBF
-2	6	Orlando Canizales	34–1–1–1 (26 KO)	Bantamweight	IBF
-2	7	Riddick Bowe	34–0 (29 KO)	Heavyweight	WBA and IBF
+1	8	Roy Jones Jr.	22–0 (20 KO)	Middleweight	IBF
+1	9	Azumah Nelson	36–2–1 (25 KO)	Super featherweight	WBC
New	10	Kennedy McKinney	24–0–1 (15 KO)	Super bantamweight	IBF

March 17, 1993
Changes	Rank	Boxer	Record	Weight class	Title(s)
—N/a	1	Julio César Chávez	85–0 (71 KO)	Light welterweight	WBC
—N/a	2	Pernell Whitaker	32–1 (15 KO)	Welterweight	WBC
—N/a	3	Terry Norris	34–3 (20 KO)	Light middleweight	WBC
—N/a	4	Orlando Canizales	33–1–1 (25 KO)	Bantamweight	IBF
+1	5	Riddick Bowe	33–0 (28 KO)	Heavyweight	WBA and IBF
+1	6	James Toney	34–0–2 (23 KO)	Super middleweight	IBF
New	7	Michael Carbajal	28–0 (16 KO)	Light flyweight	WBC and IBF
+1	8	Moon Sung-kil	19–1 (15 KO)	Super flyweight	WBC
New	9	Roy Jones Jr.	21–0 (20 KO)	Middleweight	—N/a
-2	10	Azumah Nelson	36–2–1 (25 KO)	Super featherweight	WBC

February 18, 1993
Changes	Rank	Boxer	Record	Weight class	Title(s)
—N/a	1	Julio César Chávez	84–0 (70 KO)	Light welterweight	WBC
—N/a	2	Pernell Whitaker	31–1 (15 KO)	Light welterweight	IBF
—N/a	3	Terry Norris	33–3 (19 KO)	Light middleweight	WBC
—N/a	4	Orlando Canizales	33–1–1 (25 KO)	Bantamweight	IBF
—N/a	5	Buddy McGirt	59–2–1 (44 KO)	Welterweight	WBC
—N/a	6	Riddick Bowe	33–0 (28 KO)	Heavyweight	WBA and IBF
+3	7	James Toney	34–0–2 (23 KO)	Super middleweight	IBF
-1	8	Azumah Nelson	35–2–1 (25 KO)	Super featherweight	WBC
-1	9	Moon Sung-kil	18–1 (14 KO)	Super flyweight	WBC
-1	10	Julian Jackson	46–1 (43 KO)	Middleweight	WBC

== 1992 ==
December 19, 1992
Changes	Rank	Boxer	Record	Weight class	Title(s)
—N/a	1	Julio César Chávez	84–0 (70 KO)	Light welterweight	WBC
—N/a	2	Pernell Whitaker	31–1 (15 KO)	Light welterweight	IBF
—N/a	3	Terry Norris	33–3 (19 KO)	Light middleweight	WBC
—N/a	4	Orlando Canizales	33–1–1 (25 KO)	Bantamweight	IBF
—N/a	5	Buddy McGirt	58–2–1 (44 KO)	Welterweight	WBC
—N/a	6	Riddick Bowe	32–0 (27 KO)	Heavyweight	WBA and IBF
—N/a	7	Azumah Nelson	35–2–1 (25 KO)	Super featherweight	WBC
+1	8	Moon Sung-kil	18–1 (14 KO)	Super flyweight	WBC
-1	9	Julian Jackson	46–1 (43 KO)	Middleweight	WBC
—N/a	10	James Toney	33–0–2 (22 KO)	Middleweight	IBF

November 18, 1992
Changes	Rank	Boxer	Record	Weight class	Title(s)
—N/a	1	Julio César Chávez	83–0 (70 KO)	Light welterweight	WBC
—N/a	2	Pernell Whitaker	30–1 (14 KO)	Light welterweight	IBF
—N/a	3	Terry Norris	32–3 (18 KO)	Light middleweight	WBC
+1	4	Orlando Canizales	33–1–1 (25 KO)	Bantamweight	IBF
+1	5	Buddy McGirt	58–2–1 (44 KO)	Welterweight	WBC
New	6	Riddick Bowe	32–0 (27 KO)	Heavyweight	WBA, WBC, and IBF
—N/a	7	Azumah Nelson	35–2–1 (25 KO)	Super featherweight	WBC
—N/a	8	Julian Jackson	45–1 (42 KO)	Middleweight	WBC
—N/a	9	Moon Sung-kil	18–1 (14 KO)	Super flyweight	WBC
—N/a	10	James Toney	32–0–2 (21 KO)	Middleweight	IBF

May 12, 1992
Changes	Rank	Boxer	Record	Weight class	Title(s)
—N/a	1	Julio César Chávez	80–0 (67 KO)	Light welterweight	WBC
—N/a	2	Pernell Whitaker	28–1 (13 KO)	Light welterweight	—N/a
+4	3	Terry Norris	32–3 (18 KO)	Light middleweight	WBC
—N/a	4	Evander Holyfield	27–0 (22 KO)	Heavyweight	WBA, WBC, and IBF
—N/a	5	Orlando Canizales	31–1–1 (24 KO)	Bantamweight	IBF
—N/a	6	Buddy McGirt	56–2–1 (44 KO)	Welterweight	WBC
+1	7	Azumah Nelson	34–2–1 (25 KO)	Super featherweight	WBC
+1	8	Julian Jackson	44–1 (42 KO)	Middleweight	WBC
+1	9	Moon Sung-kil	16–1 (13 KO)	Super flyweight	WBC
New	10	James Toney	30–0–2 (20 KO)	Middleweight	IBF

March 17, 1992
Changes	Rank	Boxer	Record	Weight class	Title(s)
—N/a	1	Julio César Chávez	79–0 (66 KO)	Light welterweight	WBC
—N/a	2	Pernell Whitaker	28–1 (13 KO)	Lightweight	WBA and WBC
—N/a	3	Meldrick Taylor	29–1–1 (15 KO)	Welterweight	WBA
—N/a	4	Evander Holyfield	27–0 (22 KO)	Heavyweight	WBA, WBC, and IBF
+1	5	Orlando Canizales	30–1–1 (24 KO)	Bantamweight	IBF
+1	6	Buddy McGirt	55–2–1 (43 KO)	Welterweight	WBC
+1	7	Terry Norris	31–3 (17 KO)	Light middleweight	WBC
New	8	Azumah Nelson	34–2–1 (25 KO)	Super featherweight	WBC
—N/a	9	Julian Jackson	43–1 (41 KO)	Middleweight	WBC
—N/a	10	Moon Sung-kil	16–1 (13 KO)	Super flyweight	WBC

February 19, 1992
Changes	Rank	Boxer	Record	Weight class	Title(s)
—N/a	1	Julio César Chávez	78–0 (65 KO)	Light welterweight	WBC
—N/a	2	Pernell Whitaker	28–1 (13 KO)	Lightweight	WBA, WBC, and IBF
—N/a	3	Meldrick Taylor	29–1–1 (15 KO)	Welterweight	WBA
—N/a	4	Evander Holyfield	27–0 (22 KO)	Heavyweight	WBA, WBC, and IBF
+1	5	Jeff Fenech	26–0–1 (19 KO)	Super featherweight	—N/a
+1	6	Orlando Canizales	30–1–1 (24 KO)	Bantamweight	IBF
+1	7	Buddy McGirt	55–2–1 (43 KO)	Welterweight	WBC
+1	8	Terry Norris	30–3 (16 KO)	Light middleweight	WBC
New	9	Julian Jackson	43–1 (41 KO)	Middleweight	WBC
New	10	Moon Sung-kil	16–1 (13 KO)	Super flyweight	WBC

January 14, 1992
Changes	Rank	Boxer	Record	Weight class	Title(s)
—N/a	1	Julio César Chávez	78–0 (65 KO)	Light welterweight	WBC
—N/a	2	Pernell Whitaker	27–1 (13 KO)	Lightweight	WBA, WBC, and IBF
—N/a	3	Meldrick Taylor	29–1–1 (15 KO)	Welterweight	WBA
—N/a	4	Evander Holyfield	27–0 (22 KO)	Heavyweight	WBA, WBC, and IBF
—N/a	5	Mike Tyson	41–1 (36 KO)	Heavyweight	—N/a
+1	6	Jeff Fenech	26–0–1 (19 KO)	Super featherweight	—N/a
+1	7	Orlando Canizales	30–1–1 (24 KO)	Bantamweight	IBF
+1	8	Buddy McGirt	55–2–1 (43 KO)	Welterweight	WBC
New	9	Terry Norris	30–3 (16 KO)	Light middleweight	WBC
New	10	James Toney	28–0–2 (20 KO)	Middleweight	IBF

== 1991 ==
December 18, 1991
Changes	Rank	Boxer	Record	Weight class	Title(s)
—N/a	1	Julio César Chávez	78–0 (65 KO)	Light welterweight	WBC
—N/a	2	Pernell Whitaker	27–1 (13 KO)	Lightweight	WBA, WBC, and IBF
—N/a	3	Meldrick Taylor	28–1–1 (15 KO)	Welterweight	WBA
—N/a	4	Evander Holyfield	27–0 (22 KO)	Heavyweight	WBA, WBC, and IBF
—N/a	5	Mike Tyson	41–1 (36 KO)	Heavyweight	—N/a
—N/a	6	Yuh Myung-woo	36–0 (14 KO) (Note: Though Myung-woo lost to Hiroki Ioka on Dec 17th, he's still listed as 36–0 in the ratings.)	Light flyweight	WBA
—N/a	7	Jeff Fenech	26–0–1 (19 KO)	Super featherweight	—N/a
—N/a	8	Orlando Canizales	29–1–1 (23 KO)	Bantamweight	IBF
New	9	Buddy McGirt	55–2–1 (43 KO)	Welterweight	WBC
-1	10	Khaosai Galaxy	46–1 (40 KO)	Super flyweight	WBA

July 16, 1991
Changes	Rank	Boxer	Record	Weight class	Title(s)
—N/a	1	Julio César Chávez	75–0 (62 KO)	Light welterweight	WBC
—N/a	2	Pernell Whitaker	25–1 (13 KO)	Lightweight	WBA, WBC, and IBF
—N/a	3	Meldrick Taylor	27–1–1 (14 KO)	Welterweight	WBA
—N/a	4	Evander Holyfield	26–0 (21 KO)	Heavyweight	WBA, WBC, and IBF
—N/a	5	Mike Tyson	41–1 (36 KO)	Heavyweight	—N/a
—N/a	6	Yuh Myung-woo	36–0 (14 KO)	Light flyweight	WBA
New	7	Jeff Fenech	25–0–1 (19 KO)	Super featherweight	—N/a
-1	8	Orlando Canizales	28–1–1 (23 KO)	Bantamweight	IBF
-1	9	Khaosai Galaxy	45–1 (40 KO)	Super flyweight	WBA
-1	10	Simon Brown	34–1 (26 KO)	Welterweight	WBC

June 20, 1991
Changes	Rank	Boxer	Record	Weight class	Title(s)
—N/a	1	Julio César Chávez	75–0 (62 KO)	Light welterweight	WBC
—N/a	2	Pernell Whitaker	25–1 (13 KO)	Lightweight	WBA, WBC, and IBF
—N/a	3	Meldrick Taylor	27–1–1 (14 KO)	Welterweight	WBA
—N/a	4	Evander Holyfield	26–0 (21 KO)	Heavyweight	WBA, WBC, and IBF
—N/a	5	Mike Tyson	40–1 (36 KO)	Heavyweight	—N/a
—N/a	6	Yuh Myung-woo	36–0 (14 KO)	Light flyweight	WBA
—N/a	7	Orlando Canizales	28–1–1 (23 KO)	Bantamweight	IBF
—N/a	8	Khaosai Galaxy	45–1 (40 KO)	Super flyweight	WBA
—N/a	9	Simon Brown	34–1 (26 KO)	Welterweight	WBC
New	10	Terry Norris	28–3 (15 KO)	Light middleweight	WBC

May 20, 1991
Changes	Rank	Boxer	Record	Weight class	Title(s)
—N/a	1	Julio César Chávez	75–0 (62 KO)	Light welterweight	WBC
—N/a	2	Pernell Whitaker	25–1 (13 KO)	Lightweight	WBA, WBC, and IBF
+1	3	Meldrick Taylor	26–1–1 (14 KO)	Welterweight	WBA
+1	4	Evander Holyfield	26–0 (21 KO)	Heavyweight	WBA, WBC, and IBF
+1	5	Mike Tyson	40–1 (36 KO)	Heavyweight	—N/a
+1	6	Yuh Myung-woo	36–0 (14 KO)	Light flyweight	WBA
+2	7	Orlando Canizales	28–1–1 (23 KO)	Bantamweight	IBF
—N/a	8	Khaosai Galaxy	45–1 (40 KO)	Super flyweight	WBA
+1	9	Simon Brown	34–1 (26 KO)	Welterweight	WBC
New	10	Virgil Hill	30–0 (18 KO)	Light heavyweight	WBA

March 20, 1991
Changes	Rank	Boxer	Record	Weight class	Title(s)
—N/a	1	Julio César Chávez	74–0 (62 KO)	Light welterweight	WBC and IBF
—N/a	2	Pernell Whitaker	25–1 (13 KO)	Lightweight	WBA, WBC, and IBF
—N/a	3	Michael Nunn	36–0 (24 KO)	Middleweight	IBF
+1	4	Meldrick Taylor	26–1–1 (14 KO)	Welterweight	WBA
+1	5	Evander Holyfield	25–0 (21 KO)	Heavyweight	WBA, WBC, and IBF
+1	6	Mike Tyson	40–1 (36 KO)	Heavyweight	—N/a
+2	7	Yuh Myung-woo	35–0 (13 KO)	Light flyweight	WBA
+2	8	Khaosai Galaxy	44–1 (39 KO)	Super flyweight	WBA
New	9	Orlando Canizales	27–1–1 (22 KO)	Bantamweight	IBF
New	10	Simon Brown	34–1 (26 KO)	Welterweight	WBC and IBF

February 20, 1991
Changes	Rank	Boxer	Record	Weight class	Title(s)
—N/a	1	Julio César Chávez	73–0 (61 KO)	Light welterweight	WBC and IBF
—N/a	2	Pernell Whitaker	24–1 (13 KO)	Lightweight	WBA, WBC, and IBF
—N/a	3	Michael Nunn	36–0 (24 KO)	Middleweight	IBF
+1	4	Meldrick Taylor	26–1–1 (14 KO)	Welterweight	WBA
-1	5	Antonio Esparragoza	30–1–4 (27 KO)	Featherweight	WBA
—N/a	6	Evander Holyfield	25–0 (21 KO)	Heavyweight	WBA, WBC, and IBF
—N/a	7	Mike Tyson	39–1 (35 KO)	Heavyweight	—N/a
—N/a	8	Raúl Pérez	48–1–2 (30 KO)	Bantamweight	WBC
—N/a	9	Yuh Myung-woo	35–0 (13 KO)	Light flyweight	WBA
—N/a	10	Khaosai Galaxy	44–1 (39 KO)	Super flyweight	WBA

== 1990 ==
December 20, 1990
Changes	Rank	Boxer	Record	Weight class	Title(s)
—N/a	1	Julio César Chávez	73–0 (61 KO)	Light welterweight	WBC and IBF
—N/a	2	Pernell Whitaker	24–1 (13 KO)	Lightweight	WBA, WBC, and IBF
—N/a	3	Michael Nunn	36–0 (24 KO)	Middleweight	IBF
—N/a	4	Antonio Esparragoza	30–1–4 (27 KO)	Featherweight	WBA
—N/a	5	Meldrick Taylor	25–1–1 (14 KO)	Light welterweight	—N/a
+1	6	Evander Holyfield	25–0 (21 KO)	Heavyweight	WBA, WBC, and IBF
+1	7	Mike Tyson	39–1 (35 KO)	Heavyweight	—N/a
+1	8	Raúl Pérez	48–1–2 (30 KO)	Bantamweight	WBC
+1	9	Yuh Myung-woo	35–0 (13 KO)	Light flyweight	WBA
New	10	Khaosai Galaxy	44–1 (39 KO)	Super flyweight	WBA

November 20, 1990
Changes	Rank	Boxer	Record	Weight class	Title(s)
—N/a	1	Julio César Chávez	72–0 (60 KO)	Light welterweight	WBC and IBF
—N/a	2	Pernell Whitaker	23–1 (13 KO)	Lightweight	WBA, WBC, and IBF
—N/a	3	Michael Nunn	36–0 (24 KO)	Middleweight	IBF
—N/a	4	Antonio Esparragoza	30–1–4 (27 KO)	Featherweight	WBA
—N/a	5	Meldrick Taylor	25–1–1 (14 KO)	Light welterweight	—N/a
+3	6	Humberto González	30–0 (24 KO)	Light flyweight	WBC
New	7	Evander Holyfield	25–0 (21 KO)	Heavyweight	WBA, WBC, and IBF
-1	8	Mike Tyson	38–1 (34 KO)	Heavyweight	—N/a
-1	9	Raúl Pérez	47–1–2 (29 KO)	Bantamweight	WBC
—N/a	10	Yuh Myung-woo	34–0 (13 KO)	Light flyweight	WBA

September 20, 1990
Changes	Rank	Boxer	Record	Weight class	Title(s)
—N/a	1	Julio César Chávez	71–0 (59 KO)	Light welterweight	WBC and IBF
—N/a	2	Pernell Whitaker	23–1 (13 KO)	Lightweight	WBA, WBC, and IBF
—N/a	3	Michael Nunn	35–0 (23 KO)	Middleweight	IBF
—N/a	4	Antonio Esparragoza	30–1–4 (27 KO)	Featherweight	WBA
—N/a	5	Meldrick Taylor	25–1–1 (14 KO)	Light welterweight	—N/a
—N/a	6	Buster Douglas	29–4–1–1 (20 KO)	Heavyweight	WBA, WBC, and IBF
—N/a	7	Mike Tyson	38–1 (34 KO)	Heavyweight	—N/a
—N/a	8	Raúl Pérez	47–1–2 (29 KO)	Bantamweight	WBC
+1	9	Humberto González	30–0 (24 KO)	Light flyweight	WBC
-1	10	Yuh Myung-woo	34–0 (13 KO)	Light flyweight	WBA

June 18, 1990
Changes	Rank	Boxer	Record	Weight class	Title(s)
—N/a	1	Julio César Chávez	69–0 (57 KO)	Light welterweight	WBC and IBF
—N/a	2	Pernell Whitaker	22–1 (12 KO)	Lightweight	WBC and IBF
—N/a	3	Michael Nunn	35–0 (23 KO)	Middleweight	IBF
—N/a	4	Antonio Esparragoza	30–1–4 (27 KO)	Featherweight	WBA
—N/a	5	Meldrick Taylor	24–1–1 (14 KO)	Light welterweight	—N/a
—N/a	6	Buster Douglas	29–4–1–1 (20 KO)	Heavyweight	WBA, WBC, and IBF
—N/a	7	Mike Tyson	37–1 (33 KO)	Heavyweight	—N/a
—N/a	8	Raúl Pérez	47–1–1 (29 KO)	Bantamweight	WBC
+1	9	Yuh Myung-woo	34–0 (13 KO)	Light flyweight	WBA
New	10	Humberto González	28–0 (22 KO)	Light flyweight	WBC

May 15, 1990
Changes	Rank	Boxer	Record	Weight class	Title(s)
—N/a	1	Julio César Chávez	69–0 (57 KO)	Light welterweight	WBC and IBF
—N/a	2	Pernell Whitaker	21–1 (12 KO)	Lightweight	WBC and IBF
—N/a	3	Michael Nunn	35–0 (23 KO)	Middleweight	IBF
—N/a	4	Antonio Esparragoza	30–1–4 (27 KO)	Featherweight	WBA
—N/a	5	Meldrick Taylor	24–1–1 (14 KO)	Light welterweight	—N/a
—N/a	6	Buster Douglas	29–4–1–1 (20 KO)	Heavyweight	WBA, WBC, and IBF
—N/a	7	Mike Tyson	37–1 (33 KO)	Heavyweight	—N/a
+1	8	Raúl Pérez	47–1–1 (29 KO)	Bantamweight	WBC
-1	9	Azumah Nelson	31–1 (23 KO)	Super featherweight	WBC
—N/a	10	Yuh Myung-woo	34–0 (13 KO)	Light flyweight	WBA

April 18, 1990
Changes	Rank	Boxer	Record	Weight class	Title(s)
—N/a	1	Julio César Chávez	69–0 (57 KO)	Light welterweight	WBC and IBF
—N/a	2	Pernell Whitaker	21–1 (12 KO)	Lightweight	WBC and IBF
—N/a	3	Michael Nunn	35–0 (23 KO)	Middleweight	IBF
—N/a	4	Antonio Esparragoza	29–1–4 (27 KO)	Featherweight	WBA
—N/a	5	Meldrick Taylor	24–1–1 (14 KO)	Light welterweight	—N/a
—N/a	6	Buster Douglas	29–4–1–1 (20 KO)	Heavyweight	WBA, WBC, and IBF
—N/a	7	Mike Tyson	37–1 (33 KO)	Heavyweight	—N/a
—N/a	8	Azumah Nelson	31–1 (23 KO)	Super featherweight	WBC
—N/a	9	Raúl Pérez	46–1–1 (28 KO)	Bantamweight	WBC
New	10	Yuh Myung-woo	33–0 (13 KO)	Light flyweight	WBA

February 12, 1990
Changes	Rank	Boxer	Record	Weight class	Title(s)
+1	1	Julio César Chávez	68–0 (56 KO)	Light welterweight	WBC
+1	2	Pernell Whitaker	21–1 (12 KO)	Lightweight	WBC and IBF
+1	3	Michael Nunn	34–0 (23 KO)	Middleweight	IBF
+1	4	Antonio Esparragoza	29–1–4 (27 KO)	Featherweight	WBA
+1	5	Meldrick Taylor	24–0–1 (14 KO)	Light welterweight	IBF
New	6	Buster Douglas	29–4–1–1 (20 KO)	Heavyweight	WBA, WBC, and IBF
-6	7	Mike Tyson	37–1 (33 KO)	Heavyweight	—N/a
-1	8	Azumah Nelson	31–1 (23 KO)	Super featherweight	WBC
-1	9	Raúl Pérez	46–1–1 (28 KO)	Bantamweight	WBC
-1	10	Virgil Hill	26–0 (17 KO)	Light heavyweight	WBA

== 1989 ==
November 20, 1989
Changes	Rank	Boxer	Record	Weight class	Title(s)
—N/a	1	Mike Tyson	37–0 (33 KO)	Heavyweight	WBA, WBC, IBF, and The Ring
—N/a	2	Julio César Chávez	67–0 (55 KO)	Light welterweight	WBC
—N/a	3	Pernell Whitaker	19–1 (11 KO)	Lightweight	WBC, IBF, and The Ring
—N/a	4	Michael Nunn	34–0 (23 KO)	Middleweight	IBF and The Ring
—N/a	5	Antonio Esparragoza	29–1–4 (27 KO)	Featherweight	WBA and The Ring
+1	6	Meldrick Taylor	23–0–1 (13 KO)	Light welterweight	IBF
-1	7	Azumah Nelson	31–1 (23 KO)	Super featherweight	WBC
—N/a	8	Raúl Pérez	45–1–1 (28 KO)	Bantamweight	WBC
New	9	Virgil Hill	26–0 (17 KO)	Light heavyweight	WBA
New	10	Marlon Starling	45–4–1–1 (26 KO)	Welterweight	WBC

September 12, 1989
Rank	Boxer	Record	Weight class	Title(s)
1	Mike Tyson	37–0 (33 KO)	Heavyweight	WBA, WBC, IBF, and The Ring
2	Julio César Chávez	64–0 (52 KO)	Light welterweight	WBC
3	Pernell Whitaker	19–1 (11 KO)	Lightweight	WBC, IBF, and The Ring
4	Michael Nunn	34–0 (23 KO)	Middleweight	IBF and The Ring
5	Antonio Esparragoza	28–1–4 (26 KO)	Featherweight	WBA and The Ring
6	Azumah Nelson	30–1 (22 KO)	Super featherweight	WBC
7	Meldrick Taylor	22–0–1 (12 KO)	Light welterweight	IBF
8	Raúl Pérez	44–1–1 (29 KO)	Bantamweight	WBC
9	Evander Holyfield	22–0 (18 KO)	Heavyweight	—N/a
10	Gilberto Román	53–4–1 (35 KO)	Super flyweight	WBC

== See also ==
- List of The Ring pound for pound rankings
- List of The Ring pound for pound rankings (2000s)
- List of The Ring pound for pound rankings (2010s)
- List of The Ring pound for pound rankings (2020s)
- List of fights between two The Ring pound for pound boxers
- Boxing pound for pound rankings
- The Ring
- List of current world boxing champions
- List of undisputed boxing champions
- List of WBA world champions
- List of WBC world champions
- List of IBF world champions
- List of WBO world champions
- List of The Ring world champions
