= List of The Ring pound for pound rankings =

Boxing magazine The Ring began naming the top 10 pound for pound boxers in 1989. The first #1 pound for pound fighter was heavyweight champion Mike Tyson.

The current pound for pound rankings are compiled and updated by an editorial team at The Ring, typically following major fights or significant changes to a listed boxer's activity, achievements or competition level. Updates are not made on a fixed schedule, and positions are determined via editorial consensus rather than any formal points based ranking system.

For WBA titles, only titles in the primary champion lineage are listed.

== Current pound for pound rankings ==
As of October 29, 2026
Rank	Boxer	Record	Weight class	Title(s)
1	Naoya Inoue	33–0 (27 KO)	Super bantamweight	WBA (Super), WBC, IBF, WBO, and The Ring
2	Oleksandr Usyk	25–0 (17 KO)	Heavyweight	The Ring
3	Shakur Stevenson	25–0 (11 KO)	Light welterweight	WBO and The Ring
4	Jesse Rodriguez	24–0 (17 KO)	Bantamweight	WBA (Super)
5	David Benavidez	32–0 (26 KO)	Cruiserweight	WBA (Super) and WBO
6	Dmitry Bivol	25–1 (12 KO)	Light heavyweight	WBA (Super), IBF, WBO, and The Ring
7	Junto Nakatani	32–1 (24 KO)	Super bantamweight	—N/a
8	Devin Haney	33–0–0–1 (15 KO)	Welterweight	WBO
9	Jaron Ennis	36–0–0–1 (32 KO)	Light middleweight	WBA and WBO
10	O'Shaquie Foster	26–3 (12 KO)	Super featherweight	WBC, IBF, WBO, and The Ring

== List of pound for pound #1 fighters ==
As of November 10, 2026.

Keys:

Current P4P #1

No.	Name	Weight Division(s) as #1	Date	Duration
1	Mike Tyson	Heavyweight	September 12, 1989 – February 12, 1990	153 days
2	Julio César Chávez	Light welterweight	February 12, 1990 – September 15, 1993	3 years, 215 days
3	Pernell Whitaker	Welterweight; Light middleweight	September 15, 1993 – April 18, 1996	2 years, 219 days
4	Roy Jones Jr.	Light heavyweight	April 18, 1996 – April 17, 1997	364 days
5	Oscar De La Hoya	Welterweight	April 17, 1997 – October 5, 1999	2 years, 171 days
6	Roy Jones Jr. (2)	Light heavyweight	October 5, 1999 – July 5, 2000	274 days
7	Shane Mosley	Welterweight	July 5, 2000 – January 27, 2002	1 year, 206 days
8	Bernard Hopkins	Middleweight	January 27, 2002 – March 11, 2003	1 year, 43 days
9	Roy Jones Jr. (3)	Light heavyweight; Heavyweight	March 11, 2003 – June 8, 2004	1 year, 89 days
10	Bernard Hopkins (2)	Middleweight	June 8, 2004 – July 18, 2005	1 year, 40 days
11	Floyd Mayweather Jr.	Light welterweight; Welterweight; Light middleweight	July 18, 2005 – June 9, 2008	2 years, 327 days
12	Manny Pacquiao	Super featherweight; Lightweight; Light welterweight; Welterweight; Light middleweight	June 9, 2008 – May 7, 2012	3 years, 333 days
The Ring decided to vacate the pound-for-pound #1 rank and demoted Pacquiao to #2 that resulted in a tie with Mayweather Jr. because the members of the editorial board were unimpressed by Pacquiao's performance in his third fight with Juan Manuel Márquez, while Mayweather Jr. was not promoted to #1 because the board determined that he struggled in his fight against Miguel Cotto.
13	Floyd Mayweather Jr. (2)	Welterweight; Light middleweight	December 11, 2012 – September 15, 2015	2 years, 278 days
14	Román González	Flyweight; Super flyweight	September 15, 2015 – March 21, 2017	1 year, 187 days
15	Andre Ward	Light heavyweight	March 21 – September 26, 2017	189 days
16	Gennady Golovkin	Middleweight	September 26, 2017 – September 18, 2018	357 days
17	Vasiliy Lomachenko	Lightweight	September 18, 2018 – November 7, 2019	1 year, 50 days
18	Canelo Álvarez	Middleweight; Super middleweight; Light heavyweight	November 7, 2019 – May 7, 2022	2 years, 181 days
19	Oleksandr Usyk	Heavyweight	May 7 – June 11, 2022	35 days
20	Naoya Inoue	Bantamweight	June 11 – August 20, 2022	70 days
21	Oleksandr Usyk (2)	Heavyweight	August 20, 2022 – July 29, 2023	343 days
22	Terence Crawford	Welterweight	July 29, 2023 – May 6, 2024	282 days
23	Naoya Inoue (2)	Super bantamweight	May 6 – May 18, 2024	12 days
24	Oleksandr Usyk (3)	Heavyweight	May 18, 2024 – September 15, 2025	1 year, 120 days
25	Terence Crawford (2)	Super middleweight	September 15 – December 24, 2025	100 days
26	Oleksandr Usyk (4)	Heavyweight	December 24, 2025 – May 4, 2026	131 days
27	Naoya Inoue (3)	Super bantamweight	May 4, 2026 – present	190 days

== See also ==
- Boxing pound for pound rankings
- List of current world boxing champions
- List of fights between two The Ring pound for pound boxers
- List of The Ring pound for pound rankings (1990s)
- List of The Ring pound for pound rankings (2000s)
- List of The Ring pound for pound rankings (2010s)
- List of The Ring pound for pound rankings (2020s)
- List of WBA world champions
- List of WBC world champions
- List of IBF world champions
- List of WBO world champions
- List of The Ring world champions
- List of undisputed boxing champions
