= Boxing pound for pound rankings =

World ranking list

The following tables show the professional boxers listed in the latest top-10 pound for pound world rankings published by each of:

- The Ring magazine
- Transnational Boxing Rankings Board
- ESPN
- BoxRec

== Men's ==
Rankings updated as of 4 May 2026.

Men's top 10 rankings
Boxer	Record	Current weight class	Current world title(s)	Ranker			
Boxer	Record	Current weight class	Current world title(s)	The Ring	ESPN	TBRB	BoxRec
Naoya Inoue	33–0 (27 KO)	Super bantamweight	WBA (Super), WBC, IBF, WBO, and The Ring (Undisputed)	1	1	1	1
Oleksandr Usyk	24–0 (15 KO)	Heavyweight	The Ring	2	2	2	9
Jesse Rodriguez	23–0 (16 KO)	Super flyweight	WBA, WBC, WBO, and The Ring	3	4	3	8
Dmitry Bivol	24–1 (12 KO)	Light heavyweight	WBA (Super), IBF, WBO, and The Ring	4	3	4	–
Artur Beterbiev	21–1 (20 KO)	Light heavyweight	–	5	5	5	–
Junto Nakatani	32–0 (24 KO)	Super bantamweight	–	6	8	6	6
Shakur Stevenson	24–0 (11 KO)	Lightweight	WBC	7	7	9	2
David Benavidez	31–0 (25 KO)	Light heavyweight	WBC	8	6	10	7
Devin Haney	33–0 (1) (15 KO)	Welterweight	WBO	9	9	–	–
Oscar Collazo	13–0 (10 KO)	Mini flyweight	WBA (Super), WBO, and The Ring	10	–	–	–
Canelo Álvarez	63–3–2 (39 KO)	Super middleweight	–	–	–	7	5
Teófimo López	22–1 (13 KO)	Light welterweight	WBO and The Ring	–	10	8	–
Jaron Ennis	35–0 (1) (31 KO)	Light middleweight	Interim WBA	–	–	–	4

== Women's ==
Rankings updated as of 15 January 2026.

Women's top 10 rankings
Boxer	Record	Weight class	Current world title(s)	Ranker			
Boxer	Record	Weight class	Current world title(s)	The Ring	ESPN	TBRB	BoxRec
Katie Taylor	25–1 (6 KO)	Light welterweight	WBA, IBF, WBO, IBO, and The Ring	1	2	1	3
Claressa Shields	17–0 (3 KO)	Heavyweight	WBA, WBC, IBF, WBO, and WBF	2	1	2	7
Mikaela Mayer	22–2 (5 KO)	Light middleweight	WBA, WBC, and WBO	3	6	3	–
Chantelle Cameron	21–1 (8 KO)	Light welterweight	Interim WBC	4	5	4	10
Amanda Serrano	48–4–1 (31 KO)	Featherweight	WBA, WBO, and The Ring	5	3	8	2
Gabriela Fundora	17–0 (1) (9 KO)	Flyweight	WBA, WBC, IBF, WBO, and The Ring	6	4	7	1
Dina Thorslund	23–0 (9 KO)	Bantamweight	–	7	–	6	–
Lauren Price	9–0 (2 KO)	Welterweight	WBA, WBC, IBF, IBO, and The Ring	8	8	9	–
Yokasta Valle	34–3 (10 KO)	Mini flyweight	WBC	9	9	5	6
Ellie Scotney	11–0	Super bantamweight	WBC and IBF, WBO, and The Ring	10	–	10	8
Alycia Baumgardner	17–1 (1) (7 KO)	Super featherweight	WBA, WBC, IBF, WBO, IBO, and The Ring	–	7	–	5
Elif Nur Turhan	12–0 (8 KO)	Lightweight	IBF	–	10	–	9
Evelyn Nazarena Bermúdez	22–1–1 (8 KO)	Light flyweight	WBA, IBF, and WBO	–	–	–	4

== See also ==
- List of current world boxing champions
- List of TBRB pound for pound rankings
- List of The Ring magazine world champions
- List of The Ring pound for pound rankings
- List of fights between two The Ring pound for pound boxers
- List of boxing weight classes
