= List of fights between two The Ring pound for pound boxers =

Since 1989, The Ring has started naming the top 10 pound for pound best boxers in the world. This list features fights where the boxers involved were in the active top 10 list at the time of their fight.

== 1990s ==
Fight name and Rank	Date	World title(s)	Result
(#1) Julio César Chávez vs. (#5) Meldrick Taylor	Mar 17, 1990	Chávez's WBC light welterweight title	Chávez wins via 12th–round TKO
(#1) Julio César Chávez vs. (#5) Meldrick Taylor	Mar 17, 1990	Taylor's IBF light welterweight title	Chávez wins via 12th–round TKO
(#2) Pernell Whitaker vs. (#9) Azumah Nelson	May 19, 1990	Whitaker's WBC and IBF lightweight titles	Whitaker wins via UD (116-114, 116-111, 115-113)
(#7) Terry Norris vs. (#3) Meldrick Taylor	May 9, 1992	Norris' WBC light middleweight title	Norris wins via 4th–round TKO
(#5) Buddy McGirt vs. (#2) Pernell Whitaker	Mar 6, 1993	McGirt's WBC welterweight title	Whitaker wins via UD (117-111, 115-114, 115-113)
(#2) Pernell Whitaker vs. (#1) Julio César Chávez	Sep 10, 1993	Whitaker's WBC welterweight title	Majority draw (115–113, 115–115, 115–115)
(#8) Frankie Randall vs. (#9) Julio César Chávez	May 7, 1994	Randall's WBC light welterweight title	Chávez wins by 8th-round split TD (77–74, 76–75, 75–76)
(#2) James Toney vs. (#7) Roy Jones Jr.	Nov 18, 1994	Toney's IBF super middleweight title	Jones Jr. wins via UD (119-108, 117-110, 118-109)
(#2) Pernell Whitaker vs. (#3) Oscar De La Hoya	Apr 12, 1997	Whitaker's WBC welterweight title	De La Hoya wins via UD (116-110, 116-110, 115-111)
(#1) Oscar De La Hoya vs. (#4) Félix Trinidad	Sep 18, 1999	De La Hoya's WBC welterweight title	Trinidad wins via MD (114–114, 115–114, 115–113)
(#1) Oscar De La Hoya vs. (#4) Félix Trinidad	Sep 18, 1999	Trinidad's IBF welterweight title	Trinidad wins via MD (114–114, 115–114, 115–113)

== 2000s ==
Fight name and Rank	Date	World title(s)	Result
(#3) Oscar De La Hoya vs. (#4) Shane Mosley	Jun 17, 2000	De La Hoya's WBC welterweight title	Mosley wins via SD (116-112, 113-115, 115-113)
(#3) Félix Trinidad vs. (#9) Fernando Vargas	Dec 2, 2000	Trinidad's WBA light middleweight title	Trinidad wins via 12th–round KO
(#3) Félix Trinidad vs. (#9) Fernando Vargas	Dec 2, 2000	Vargas' IBF light middleweight title	Trinidad wins via 12th–round KO
(#7) Floyd Mayweather Jr. vs. (#5) Diego Corrales	Jan 20, 2001	Mayweather Jr.'s WBC super featherweight title	Mayweather Jr. wins via 10th–round TKO
(#6) Naseem Hamed vs. (#9) Marco Antonio Barrera	Apr 7, 2001	–	Barrera wins via UD (115-112, 116-111, 115-112)
(#2) Félix Trinidad vs. (#7) Bernard Hopkins	Sep 29, 2001	Trinidad's WBA middleweight titles	Hopkins wins via 12th–round TKO
(#2) Félix Trinidad vs. (#7) Bernard Hopkins	Sep 29, 2001	Hopkins' WBC and IBF middleweight title	Hopkins wins via 12th–round TKO
(#8) Ricardo Mayorga vs. (#9) Vernon Forrest II	Jul 12, 2003	Mayorga's WBA (Unified), WBC, and The Ring welterweight titles	Mayorga wins via MD (114-114, 115-114, 116-112)
(#4) Oscar De La Hoya vs. (#10) Shane Mosley II	Sep 13, 2003	De La Hoya's WBA (Unified), WBC, and The Ring light middleweight titles	Mosley wins via SD (115-113, 115-113, 115-113)
(#1) Roy Jones Jr. vs. (#10) Antonio Tarver II	May 15, 2004	Jones Jr.'s WBA (Unified), WBC, and The Ring light heavyweight titles	Tarver wins via 2nd–round TKO
(#9) Oscar De La Hoya vs. (#1) Bernard Hopkins	Sep 18, 2004	De La Hoya's WBO middleweight title	Hopkins wins via 9th–round KO
(#9) Oscar De La Hoya vs. (#1) Bernard Hopkins	Sep 18, 2004	Hopkins' WBA (Undisputed), WBC, IBF, and The Ring middleweight titles	Hopkins wins via 9th–round KO
(#8) Érik Morales vs. (#5) Manny Pacquiao	Mar 19, 2005	–	Morales wins via UD (115-113, 115-113, 115-113)
(#9) Jermain Taylor vs. (#10) Bernard Hopkins II	Dec 3, 2005	Taylor's WBA (Undisputed), WBC, WBO, and The Ring middleweight titles	Taylor wins via UD (115-113, 115-113, 115-113)
(#6) Érik Morales vs. (#5) Manny Pacquiao II	Jan 21, 2006	–	Pacquiao wins via 10th–round TKO
(#6) Bernard Hopkins vs. (#5) Winky Wright	Jul 21, 2007	Hopkins' The Ring light heavyweight title	Hopkins wins via UD (116-112, 117-111, 117-111)
(#1) Floyd Mayweather Jr. vs. (#8) Ricky Hatton	Dec 8, 2007	Mayweather Jr.'s WBC and The Ring welterweight titles	Mayweather Jr. wins via 10th–round TKO
(#6) Israel Vázquez vs. (#10) Rafael Márquez III	Mar 1, 2008	Vázquez's WBC and The Ring super bantamweight titles	Vázquez wins via SD (114-111, 111-114, 113-112)
(#3) Juan Manuel Márquez vs. (#2) Manny Pacquiao II	Mar 15, 2008	Márquez's WBC super featherweight title	Pacquiao wins via SD (112-115, 115-112, 114-113)
(#3) Juan Manuel Márquez vs. (#2) Manny Pacquiao II	Mar 15, 2008	Vacant The Ring super featherweight title	Pacquiao wins via SD (112-115, 115-112, 114-113)
(#4) Bernard Hopkins vs. (#5) Joe Calzaghe	Apr 19, 2008	Hopkins' The Ring light heavyweight title	Calzaghe wins via SD (113-114, 115-112, 116-111)
(#7) Kelly Pavlik vs. (#4) Bernard Hopkins	Oct 18, 2008	–	Hopkins wins via UD (119-106, 118-108, 117-109)
(#1) Manny Pacquiao vs. (#8) Ricky Hatton	May 2, 2009	Hatton's The Ring light welterweight title	Pacquiao wins via 2nd–round KO
(#1) Manny Pacquiao vs. (#7) Miguel Cotto	Nov 14, 2009	Cotto's WBO welterweight title	Pacquiao wins via 12th–round TKO

== 2010s ==
Fight name and Rank	Date	World title(s)	Result
(#2) Floyd Mayweather Jr. vs. (#3) Shane Mosley	May 1, 2010	–	Mayweather Jr. wins via UD (119-109, 119-109, 118-110)
(#6) Sergio Martínez vs. (#5) Paul Williams II	Nov 20, 2010	Martínez's WBC and The Ring middleweight titles	Martínez wins via 2nd–round KO
(#7) Fernando Montiel vs. (#5) Nonito Donaire	Feb 19, 2011	Montiel's WBC and WBO bantamweight titles	Donaire wins via 2nd–round TKO
(#1) Manny Pacquiao vs. (#5) Juan Manuel Márquez III	Nov 12, 2011	Pacquiao's WBO welterweight title	Pacquiao wins via MD (114-114, 115-113, 116-112)
(#2) Manny Pacquiao vs. (#8) Timothy Bradley	Jun 9, 2012	Pacquiao's WBO welterweight title	Bradley wins via SD (113-115, 115-113, 115-113)
(#5) Andre Ward vs. (#10) Chad Dawson	Sep 8, 2012	Ward's WBA (Super), WBC, and The Ring super middleweight titles	Ward wins via 10th–round TKO
(#2) Manny Pacquiao vs. (#6) Juan Manuel Márquez IV	Dec 8, 2012	–	Márquez wins via 6th–round KO
(#1) Floyd Mayweather Jr. vs. (#8) Robert Guerrero	May 4, 2013	Mayweather Jr.'s WBC welterweight title	Mayweather Jr. wins via UD (117-111, 117-111, 117-111)
(#1) Floyd Mayweather Jr. vs. (#8) Robert Guerrero	May 4, 2013	Vacant The Ring welterweight title	Mayweather Jr. wins via UD (117-111, 117-111, 117-111)
(#1) Floyd Mayweather Jr. vs. (#9) Canelo Álvarez	Sep 14, 2013	Mayweather Jr.'s WBA (Super) light middleweight title	Mayweather Jr. wins via MD (114-114, 116-112, 117-111)
(#1) Floyd Mayweather Jr. vs. (#9) Canelo Álvarez	Sep 14, 2013	Álvarez's WBC and The Ring light middleweight titles	Mayweather Jr. wins via MD (114-114, 116-112, 117-111)
(#8) Timothy Bradley vs. (#3) Juan Manuel Márquez	Oct 12, 2013	Bradley's WBO welterweight title	Bradley wins via SD (113-115, 115-113, 116-112)
(#7) Manny Pacquiao vs. (#3) Timothy Bradley II	Apr 12, 2014	Bradley's WBO welterweight title	Pacquiao wins via UD (116-112, 116-112, 118-110)
(#1) Floyd Mayweather Jr. vs. (#3) Manny Pacquiao	May 2, 2015	Mayweather Jr.'s WBA (Unified), WBC, and The Ring welterweight titles	Mayweather Jr. wins via UD (116-112, 116-112, 118-110)
(#1) Floyd Mayweather Jr. vs. (#3) Manny Pacquiao	May 2, 2015	Pacquiao's WBO welterweight title	Mayweather Jr. wins via UD (116-112, 116-112, 118-110)
(#7) Manny Pacquiao vs. (#9) Timothy Bradley III	Apr 12, 2016	–	Pacquiao wins via UD (116-110, 116-110, 116-110)
(#2) Sergey Kovalev vs. (#4) Andre Ward	Nov 19, 2016	Kovalev's WBA (Undisputed), IBF, and WBO light heavyweight titles	Ward wins via UD (114-113, 114-113, 114-113)
(#1) Andre Ward vs. (#2) Sergey Kovalev II	Jun 17, 2017	Ward's WBA (Undisputed), IBF, and WBO light heavyweight titles	Ward wins via 8th–round TKO
(#1) Andre Ward vs. (#2) Sergey Kovalev II	Jun 17, 2017	Vacant The Ring light heavyweight title	Ward wins via 8th–round TKO
(#7) Canelo Álvarez vs. (#2) Gennady Golovkin	Sep 16, 2017	Álvarez's The Ring middleweight title	Split draw (118-110, 113-115, 114-114)
(#7) Canelo Álvarez vs. (#2) Gennady Golovkin	Sep 16, 2017	Golovkin's WBA (Super), WBC, and IBF middleweight titles	Split draw (118-110, 113-115, 114-114)
(#3) Vasiliy Lomachenko vs. (#4) Guillermo Rigondeaux	Dec 9, 2017	Lomachenko's WBO super featherweight title	Lomachenko wins via 6th–round RTD
(#10) Errol Spence Jr. vs. (#7) Mikey Garcia	Mar 16, 2019	Spence Jr.'s IBF welterweight title	Spence Jr. wins via UD (120-107, 120-108, 120-108)

== 2020s ==
Fight name and Rank	Date	World title(s)	Result
(#4) Errol Spence Jr. vs. (#3) Terence Crawford	Jul 29, 2023	Spence Jr.'s WBA (Super), WBC, and IBF welterweight titles	Crawford wins via 9th–round TKO
(#4) Errol Spence Jr. vs. (#3) Terence Crawford	Jul 29, 2023	Crawford's WBO welterweight title	Crawford wins via 9th–round TKO
(#4) Errol Spence Jr. vs. (#3) Terence Crawford	Jul 29, 2023	Vacant The Ring welterweight title	Crawford wins via 9th–round TKO
(#6) Artur Beterbiev vs. (#7) Dmitry Bivol	Oct 12, 2024	Beterbiev's WBC, IBF, and WBO light heavyweight titles	Beterbiev wins via MD (114-114, 115-113, 116-112)
(#6) Artur Beterbiev vs. (#7) Dmitry Bivol	Oct 12, 2024	Bivol's WBA (Super) light heavyweight title	Beterbiev wins via MD (114-114, 115-113, 116-112)
(#6) Artur Beterbiev vs. (#7) Dmitry Bivol	Oct 12, 2024	Vacant The Ring light heavyweight title	Beterbiev wins via MD (114-114, 115-113, 116-112)
(#4) Artur Beterbiev vs. (#5) Dmitry Bivol II	Feb 22, 2025	Beterbiev's WBA (Super), WBC, IBF, WBO, and The Ring light heavyweight titles	Bivol wins via MD (114-114, 116-112, 115-113)
(#8) Canelo Álvarez vs. (#3) Terence Crawford	Sep 13, 2025	Álvarez's WBA (Super), WBC, IBF, WBO, and The Ring super middleweight titles	Crawford wins via UD (116-112, 115-113, 115-113)
(#2) Naoya Inoue vs. (#6) Junto Nakatani	May 2, 2026	Inoue's WBA (Super), WBC, IBF, WBO, and The Ring super bantamweight titles	Inoue wins via UD (116-112, 115-113, 116-112)

== See also ==
- List of The Ring pound for pound rankings
- The Ring
- Pound for pound
