= Pound for pound =

Ranking used in combat sports

Pound for pound is a ranking used in combat sports, such as boxing, wrestling, or mixed martial arts, adjusted to compensate for weight class. As fighters in different weight classes do not compete directly, determining the best fighter pound for pound requires subjective judgment, and ratings often vary as a result.

== Boxing ==
In boxing, the term was historically associated with fighters such as Benny Leonard and Sugar Ray Robinson who were widely considered to be the most skilled fighters of their day, to distinguish them from the generally more popular (and better paid) heavyweight champions. Since 1990, The Ring magazine has maintained a pound for pound ranking of fighters.

== Mixed martial arts ==
Some mixed martial arts promotions have pound-for-pound rankings, including Ultimate Fighting Championship since 2013, ONE Championship since 2020, and Bellator MMA since 2021. There are also multiple unofficial MMA pound-for-pound rankings, including by ESPN.com, Sherdog, Fight Matrix, MMA Fighting and Tapology.

== Kickboxing / Muay Thai ==
ONE Championship publishes pound-for-pound rankings for kickboxing and Muay Thai since 2020. Combat Press and Beyond Kickboxing also publish pound-for-pound rankings for kickboxing.
