= Sylvester Lopez =

Filipino boxer

Personal information
- Nicknames: Silver; Stallone
- Nationality: (Philippines) Filipino
- Born: Silvester Lopez; 16 October 1987 (age 38) Kabasalan, Zamboanga Sibugay, Philippines
- Height: 5 ft 6 1/2 in (1.69 m)
- Weight: Super Flyweight

Boxing career
- Stance: Orthodox

Boxing record
- Total fights: 44
- Wins: 28
- Win by KO: 19
- Losses: 12
- Draws: 2

Sylvester Lopez (born Silvester Lopez on October 26, 1987) is a Filipino professional boxer who is the current WBC Silver Super Flyweight Champion and is also the former WBC International Super Flyweight Champion.

He is a retired boxer who challenged Yota Sato on his first defense of his WBC super flyweight title back in 2012.

Born in Kabasalan, Zamboanga Sibugay, he currently resides in Sucat, Parañaque and is training under the Elorde Boxing Stable.

== Personal life ==
Silver was born on October 26, 1987, in Kabasalan, Zamboanga Sibugay. He is the son of Roseller Lopez and Maura Berador Lopez. He is the seventh among eight siblings: Roseller Jr., Christopher, Percival, Phillip, Jennifer, Rosemarie, and Lorjem. He came from a family of boxers, his father being a former professional boxer and three of this brothers (Christopher, Percival, Phillip) former amateur boxers. Among them, he is the only one active in the boxing field.

== Amateur career ==
Silver started as an amateur boxer at an early age of 13. He juggled his boxing career and high school education to be able to help his family financially. He participated in several inter-school and inter-barangay boxing competitions.

== Professional career ==
At the age of 17, former boxer Celso Danggod brought him to Manila to join Dante Almario's boxing stable. He was eventually led to Gabriel "Bebot" Elorde's boxing stable and continued his boxing career under his stable.

Lopez made his professional debut on October 13, 2006, against fellow Filipino Joey Balmes. The bout took place in Trece Martires, Cavite and he won via a unanimous decision.

Three years later, he won the vacant WBC International Super Flyweight title on April 5, 2009, by beating Korean Jong-Nam Park via a technical knockout in the 8th round. Park went down three times in the opening round and was floored once in the 8th round, which prompted the stoppage. The fight took place in the Ynares Sports Arena in Pasig.

Lopez successfully defended his belt against Japanese Katsumi Makiyama and Thai Wandee Singwangcha on November 28, 2009, and July 31, 2010, respectively. Both bouts happened in Pasig.

On October 2, 2010, he lost via 5th-round technical decision over Juan José Montes for Montes' WBC Youth World Super Flyweight belt. This fight also was a WBC Super Flyweight title eliminator, where the winner will challenge the world title then held by Tomás Rojas. A rematch was negotiated in the WBC convention but was not granted.

On September 24, 2011, he stopped Mexican Oscar "Ceviche" Ibarra to successfully capture the WBC Silver Super Flyweight belt at the Plaza De Toros in Querétaro, Mexico. This fight made him the mandatory challenger for the WBC Super Flyweight title which had been succeeded by Suriyan Sor Rungvisai at that time.

While Lopez had been the WBC's top contender in his division for about two years (the number one rated contender for over a year since January 2011), the title has been moved twice. Lopez's promoter Gabriel Elorde Jr. stated that Lopez should have been given the world title shot against any of those three champions and insisted that "Now it's our turn. Lopez is next. No more delays." Lopez watched the fight where Rungvisai lost the title to Yota Sato at ringside in Tokyo, Japan, with Elorde Jr. in March 2012. Elorde Jr. immediately contacted the WBC president José Sulaimán and reaffirmed the decision of the WBC Convention in December 2011 where Lopez was approved as a mandatory challenger for the title mentioning that he hopes that Sato would face Lopez in his first defense after three months. Although Rungvisai's promoter has held a two-fight option on Sato, Lopez's long-awaited first world title shot was decided to take place against Sato at the Yokohama Cultural Gymnasium on July 8, 2012.

== Professional boxing record ==
44 fights	28 wins	14 losses
By knockout	19	4
By decision	9	10
Draws	2	

No.	Result	Record	Opponent	Type	Round, time	Date	Location	Notes
44	Loss	28–14–2	Ibrahim Balla	UD	10	19 Aug 2017	Function Centre, Melbourne, Australia	
43	Loss	28–13–2	Evgeny Smirnov	UD	8	27 May 2017	Event-Hall, Solnechnyy, Russia	
42	Win	28–12–2	Ryuto Kyoguchi	SD	8	2 Apr 2017	Edion Arena, Osaka, Japan	
41	Loss	27–12–2	Luke Jackson	UD	10	19 Nov 2016	Princes Wharf No. 1, Hobart, Australia	For vacant WBO Oriental featherweight title
40	Win	27–11–2	Danilo Peña	TKO	7 (12), 0:56	13 Jul 2016	SM Mall of Asia Music Hall, Pasay, Philippines	Won vacant WBC-ABCO Continental featherweight title
39	Win	26–11–2	Jeson Berwela	UD	6	4 May 2016	SM Mall of Asia Music Hall, Pasay, Philippines	
38	Win	25–11–2	Junjie Lauza	UD	4	24 Oct 2015	Elorde Sprots Complex, Parañaque, Philippines	
37	Loss	24–11–2	Sho Nakazawa	UD	10	20 Jul 2015	Namihaya Dome, Kadoma, Japan	
36	Win	24–10–2	Mike Espanosa	KO	1 (6), 2:38	5 Jun 2015	SM Mall of Asia Music Hall, Pasay, Philippines	
35	Loss	23–10–2	Qiu Xiaojun	TKO	6 (12), 2:38	22 Feb 2015	Wenshan City, Yunnan, China	For vacant WBC Silver super-bantamweight title
34	Win	23–9–2	Rex Wao	KO	7 (12), 2:35	28 Dec 2014	Elorde Sports Complex, Parañaque, Philippines	Won WBC International bantamweight title
33	Loss	22–9–2	Rey Vargas	TKO	8 (10), 2:12	1 Nov 2014	Arena Coliseo, Mexico City, Mexico	For WBC Youth Silver super-bantamweight title
32	Loss	22–8–2	Alexis Boureima Kabore	UD	12	5 Sep 2014	Le palais des sports de Ouaga 2000, Ouagadougou, Burkina Faso	For WBC International super-bantamweight title
31	Win	22–7–2	Arjet Caballes	RTD	2 (6), 3:00	28 Jun 2014	Elorde Sports Complex, Parañaque, Philippines	
30	Loss	21–7–2	Rey Vargas	RTD	7 (10), 3:00	15 Mar 2014	Estasio de Beisbol, Los Cabos, Mexico	
29	Win	21–6–2	Prell Tupas	TD	8 (10), 2:38	27 Oct 2013	Elorde Sports Complex, Parañaque, Philippines	Unanimous TD: Fight stopped due to a cut on Tupas caused by an accidental headbutt
28	Loss	20–6–2	Thabo Sonjica	TKO	6 (12), 0:45	6 Jul 2013	Orient Theatre, East London, South Africa	For vacant IBO super-bantamweight title
27	Loss	20–5–2	Adrian Yung	UD	10	18 May 2013	Plaza de Toros Eloy Cavazos, Zitácuaro, Mexico	
26	Win	20–4–2	Danilo Peña	UD	12	16 Mar 2013	PAGCOR Grand Theater, Parañaque, Philippines	Won vacant WBC-ABCO Continental super-bantamweight title
25	Draw	19–4–2	Jhunriel Ramonal	TD	2 (12)	28 Oct 2012	Elorde Sports Complex, Parañaque, Philippines	For PGAB super-bantamweight title; Fight stopped due to a cut on both fighters
24	Loss	19–4–1	Yota Sato	UD	12	8 Jul 2012	Bunka Gym, Yokohama, Japan	For WBC super-flyweight title
23	Win	19–3–1	Yuki Fukumoto	TKO	4 (10), 0:19	10 Mar 2012	Elorde Sports Center, Parañaque, Philippines	
22	Win	18–3–1	Artid Bamrungauea	KO	1 (10), 1:22	3 Dec 2011	Ilocos Norte Centennial Arena, Laoag, Philippines	
21	Win	17–3–1	Óscar Ibarra	TKO	8 (12), 1:23	24 Sep 2011	Plaza de Toros, Juriquilla, Mexico	Won WBC Silver super-flyweight title
20	Win	16–3–1	Everardo Morales	TKO	1 (12), 2:08	14 May 2011	Municipal Gym, Kabasalan, Philippines	Retained WBC International super-flyweight title
19	Win	15–3–1	Noel Sungahid	TKO	1 (8), 1:08	11 Dec 2010	Wawa Basketball Court, Parañaque, Philippines	
18	Loss	14–3–1	Juan José Montes	TD	5 (12), 3:00	2 Oct 2010	Coliseo Olimpico de la UG, Guadalajara, Mexico	Unanimous TD: Fight stopped due to a cut on Montes
17	Win	14–2–1	Wandee Singwangcha	TKO	2 (12), 2:10	31 Jul 2010	Yñares Sports Arena, Pasig, Philippines	Retained WBC International super-flyweight title
16	Win	13–2–1	Dexter Mendoza	RTD	4 (10), 3:00	27 Mar 2010	Elorde Sports Center, Parañaque, Philippines	
15	Win	12–2–1	Katsumi Makiyama	TKO	5 (12), 0:23	28 Nov 2009	Yñares Sports Arena, Pasig, Philippines	Retained WBC International super-flyweight title
14	Win	11–2–1	Prell Tupas	UD	8	24 Oct 2009	Elorde Sports Center, Parañaque, Philippines	
13	Win	10–2–1	Noel Sungahid	TKO	3 (10), 2:52	27 Jun 2009	Elorde Sports Center, Parañaque, Philippines	
12	Win	9–2–1	Jong Nam Park	TKO	8 (12), 2:16	5 Apr 2009	Yñares Sports Arena, Pasig, Philippines	Won vacant WBC International super-flyweight title
11	Win	8–2–1	Noel Sungahid	TKO	2 (10), 1:45	20 Dec 2008	Elorde Sports Center, Parañaque, Philippines	
10	Win	7–2–1	Jongjong Gagante	KO	1 (8), 2:26	25 Oct 2008	Tambo Seaside View, Parañaque, Philippines	
9	Win	6–2–1	Renato Nival	UD	8	7 Sep 2008	Elorde Sports Center, Parañaque, Philippines	
8	Win	5–2–1	Romnick Rapista	TKO	2 (6), 2:50	3 May 2008	Socio-Cultural Center, Mati, Philippines	
7	Loss	4–2–1	Esmalben Bujas	SD	4	24 Nov 2007	Elorde Sports Center, Parañaque, Philippines	
6	Draw	4–1–1	Michael Romulo	MD	6	15 Aug 2007	Morning Breeze Gym in Purok 7, Muntinlupa, Philippines	
5	Loss	4–1	Mark Saloma	UD	6	30 Jun 2007	Municipal Covered Court, Muntinlupa, Philippines	
4	Win	4–0	Jonathan Pedrosa	TKO	3 (4), 2:58	22 Apr 2007	San Jose, Occidental Mindoro, Philippines	
3	Win	3–0	Jessie Caballes	UD	4	18 Feb 2007	Alabang Town Plaza, Muntinlupa, Philippines	
2	Win	2–0	Romulo Tacuycoy	TKO	1 (4), 2:20	30 Dec 2006	Sports Center, Mandaluyong, Philippines	
1	Win	1–0	Joey Balmes	UD	4	13 Oct 2006	Gym, Trece Martires, Philippines	
