= Live from Moraq =

Live From Moraq

Studio album by The Morakestra
- Released: May 6, 2008
- Recorded: 2007
- Studio: Pedernales Recording (Spicewood, Texas)
- Genre: Experimental Rock
- Length: 51.8 minutes
- Label: Stratking Records
- Producer: The Morakestra, William Mora, David Mora Dony Wynn

The Morakestra chronology
Tension Span (2005)	Live From Moraq (2008)	Witness To Connection (2009)

Live From Moraq was the first studio album made by The Morakestra and was released under the Indie label Stratking Records. The album was never presented to the media in a grand scale and it was performed in different places in Austin, Texas with a revolving lineup of session artists. It received some success in the indie scene in Austin. The album was experimental and drew influence from the El Paso band, The Mars Volta.

== Credits ==
- Produced by: Dony Wynn, David Mora, William Mora
- Mixed by: Boo Macleod, Dony Wynn
- Mastered by: Jason Corsaro
- Cover Design: Jorge Balarezo for City On Fire
- Cover portraits and Art Direction by: Daniel Pérlaky for City On Fire

== Track listing ==
All songs written by William Mora and David Mora

1. "Engine" – 4:01
2. "Independent Woman" – 2:44
3. "English Channel" – 3:56
4. "Last Time" - 3:30
5. "California" – 3:24
6. "Good Austin Night" – 3:11
7. "Tonight Is The Night" - 4:40
8. "Shoulder" – 4:28
9. "Do You Believe?" – 4:00
10. "Girl, White Dress, Central Park" – 4:34
11. "She Said" – 2:46
12. "In My Head" – 5:55
13. "Ovation" – 1:06
