= Witness to Connection =

Witness To Connection

Studio album by The Morakestra
- Released: June 2, 2009
- Recorded: Sonic Ranch Studios
- Genre: Alternative Rock; Indie Rock; Experimental Rock
- Length: 33 Minutes
- Label: Stratking Records
- Producer: Jim Ward, Gabriel Gonzalez, The Morakestra

The Morakestra chronology
Live From Moraq (2008)	Witness To Connection (2009)

Singles from Witness to Connection
- 1. "Tell You Something" Released: 2 June 2009; 2. "Angels" Released: 2 June 2009; 3. "Tonight" Released: 2 June 2009; 4. "Perfect Memory" Released: 2 June 2009

Professional ratings
Review scores
Source	Rating
Allmusic	4/5 stars
Atlanta Music Guide	(favorable)
AbsolutePunk.net	3/4 stars
Austin Vida	(favorable)
FlavorPill.com	(favorable)

Witness To Connection is the second studio album made by The Morakestra and was released under the Indie label Stratking Records. The album was promoted in mainstream media and has given The Morakestra attention from critics and mainstream media. The album was recorded at different locations in Texas and is influenced by different genres and styles of music. The album contains genres that range from alt-country traces to psychedelic guitar composition. Witness To Connection marked the change to a stable lineup for The Morakestra and was joined in post production by the other members to complement and polish the live aspect and future compositions.

== Credits ==
- Produced and Engineered By: Jim Ward, Gabriel Gonzalez
- Assistant Engineers Rick Chavarria, Justin Leah at Sonic Ranch Studios
- Mastered by: Marco A. Ramirez at Sonic Ranch Studios.
- Recorded at Sonic Ranch Studios in Tornillo, Texas and Rosewood Studios, El Paso, TX and Casa de Jim, El Paso, TX.
- Design by: Daniel Pérlaky for City On Fire
- Line illustrations by: Jacob Cass.

== Track listing ==
All songs written by William Mora and David Mora

1. "Angels" – 2:42
2. "Tell You Something" – 3:09
3. "Tonight" – 2:42
4. "Spacebar" - 2:47
5. "Goodbye" – 3:04
6. "Butterfly" – 2:46
7. "English Channel" - 3:40
8. "Hollywood" – 2:19
9. "Sunshine" – 3:18
10. "Perfect Memory" – 2:30
11. "Different Names" – 4:16
