= Kris George =

Australian boxer

Personal information
- Born: Australia
- Height: 5 ft 10 1/2 in (179 cm)
- Weight: Light-welterweight; Welterweight

Boxing career
- Reach: 71 in (180 cm)
- Stance: Orthodox

Boxing record
- Total fights: 17
- Wins: 14
- Win by KO: 8
- Losses: 3

Kris George is an Australian former professional boxer who competed from 2012 to 2018. He held the WBA Oceania super-lightweight title from 2014 to 2015 and the Commonwealth welterweight title from 2016 to 2018.

== Professional career ==
George made his professional debut on 19 October 2012, scoring a first-round technical knockout (TKO) victory over Harrison Gardner at the Rumours International in Toowoomba, Australia.

After compiling a record of 5–0 (4 KOs) he faced Ozan Craddock for the vacant Queensland State welterweight title on 14 March 2014 at the Rumours International. After suffering a suspected broken left hand in the first round, George went on to win via third-round TKO.

He followed up his Queensland State title win with a unanimous decision (UD) victory against Amor Tino on 31 October 2014 at the Rumours International, moving down in weight to capture the vacant WBA Oceania super-lightweight title. One judge scored the bout 98–92 while the other two scored it 98–93. He made the first defence of his WBA regional title against future world champion Xu Can on 27 June 2015 at the Rumours International, losing by UD with all three judges scoring the bout 96–94 to hand George the first defeat of his career.

He bounced back from defeat with four wins, one by stoppage, before defeating former two-time Olympian Cameron Hammond on 25 November 2016 at the Rumours International, capturing the vacant Commonwealth welterweight title via UD with the judges' scorecards reading 119–109, 117–111 and 116–111. In his first defence he faced Jack Brubaker on 22 October 2017 at The Star in Sydney, Australia, retaining his title via sixth-round TKO after the fight was stopped due to Brubaker suffering a cut. At the time of the stoppage George was ahead on two of the judges' scorecards with 48–47 while the third judge had Brubaker ahead with 50–46. Following a knockout (KO) win against Maximiliano Scalzone in March 2018 in a non-title fight, George made the second defence of his Commonwealth title against British 2016 Olympian Josh Kelly on 16 June 2018 at the Metro Radio Arena in Newcastle, England, with Kelly's WBA International welterweight title also on the line. After seven one-sided rounds, George's corner pulled their fighter out of the contest at the end of the seventh, handing George the second defeat of his career to lose his Commonwealth title via eighth-round corner retirement (RTD).

Following his defeat to Kelly, George announced his retirement from boxing in July 2018.

== Professional boxing record ==
16 fights	14 wins	2 losses
By knockout	8	1
By decision	6	1

No.	Result	Record	Opponent	Type	Round, time	Date	Location	Notes
16	Loss	14–2	Josh Kelly	RTD	7 (12), 3:00	16 Jun 2018	Metro Radio Arena, Newcastle, England	Lost Commonwealth welterweight title; For WBA International welterweight title
15	Win	14–1	Maximiliano Scalzone	KO	1 (5), 1:26	10 Mar 2018	Rumours International, Toowoomba, Australia	
14	Win	13–1	Jack Brubaker	TKO	6 (12), 2:20	22 Oct 2017	The Star, Sydney, Australia	Retained Commonwealth welterweight title
13	Win	12–1	Cameron Hammond	UD	12	25 Nov 2016	Rumours International, Toowoomba, Australia	Won vacant Commonwealth welterweight title
12	Win	11–1	Bowyn Morgan	TKO	3 (8)	21 Jul 2016	Horncastle Arena, Christchurch, New Zealand	
11	Win	10–1	Arnon Yucharoen	UD	5	13 May 2016	Rumours International, Toowoomba, Australia	
10	Win	9–1	Andrew Wallace	UD	6	29 Jan 2016	Rumours International, Toowoomba, Australia	
9	Win	8–1	Daniel Maxwell	UD	4	31 Oct 2015	Rumours International, Toowoomba, Australia	
8	Loss	7–1	Xu Can	UD	10	27 Jun 2015	Rumours International, Toowoomba, Australia	Lost WBA Oceania super-lightweight title
7	Win	7–0	Amor Tino	UD	10	31 Oct 2014	Rumours International, Toowoomba, Australia	Won vacant WBA Oceania super-lightweight title
6	Win	6–0	Ozan Craddock	KO	3 (8), 1:09	14 Mar 2014	Rumours International, Toowoomba, Australia	Won vacant Queensland State welterweight title
5	Win	5–0	Robert Heppell	TKO	1 (4), 0:20	15 Jun 2013	Fortitude Stadium, Brisbane, Australia	
4	Win	4–0	Dean Cambridge	TKO	1 (4), 2:07	7 Jun 2013	Rumours International, Toowoomba, Australia	
3	Win	3–0	Jay Thompson	MD	4	8 Mar 2013	Rumours International, Toowoomba, Australia	
2	Win	2–0	Trent Hudson	KO	1 (4), 1:23	23 Nov 2012	Mansfield Tavern, Brisbane, Australia	
1	Win	1–0	Harrison Gardner	TKO	1 (4), 1:25	19 Oct 2012	Rumours International, Toowoomba, Australia	

Sporting positions
Regional boxing titles
Vacant Title last held by Paddy Murphy	Queensland State welterweight champion 14 March 2014 – September 2014	Vacant Title next held by Ben Kite
Inaugural champion	WBA Oceania super-lightweight champion 31 October 2014 – 27 June 2015	Succeeded by Xu Can
Vacant Title last held by Bradley Skeete	Commonwealth welterweight champion 25 November 2016 – 16 June 2018	Succeeded by Josh Kelly
