= Manny Robles III =

American boxer (born 1994)

Personal information
- Nickname: Chato
- Born: Manuel Robles de Jesus Jr; May 18, 1994 (age 32) Los Angeles, California, U.S.
- Height: 5 ft 7 in (170 cm)
- Weight: Featherweight

Boxing career
- Reach: 68 in (173 cm)
- Stance: Orthodox

Boxing record
- Total fights: 19
- Wins: 18
- Win by KO: 8
- Losses: 1

Manny Robles III is an American professional boxer. He challenged WBA (Regular) featherweight champion Xu Can at Fantasy Springs Resort Casino in Indio, California, on November 23, 2019, losing by unanimous decision. Robles is also a former NABF featherweight title holder.
