= Yota Sato (boxer) =

Japanese boxer (born 1984)

Yota Sato 佐藤 洋太
Personal information
- Nickname: Magic Box
- Nationality: Japanese
- Born: 1 April 1984 (age 42) Morioka, Iwate, Japan
- Height: 5 ft 7 1/2 in (171 cm)
- Weight: Super flyweight

Boxing career
- Reach: 70 1/2 in (179 cm)
- Stance: Orthodox

Boxing record
- Total fights: 30
- Wins: 26
- Win by KO: 12
- Losses: 3
- Draws: 1

Yota Sato (佐藤 洋太, Satō Yōta; born 1 April 1984) is a retired Japanese professional boxer who is a former WBC Super flyweight Champion.

== Professional career ==
Sato captured the WBC super flyweight title in his first world title shot against Thailand's Suriyan Sor Rungvisai via twelve round unanimous decision after knocking him down twice in the third round. He would defend the title twice before losing it Thai challenger Srisaket Sor Rungvisai.

== Professional boxing record ==
30 fights	26 wins	3 losses
By knockout	12	1
By decision	14	2
Draws	1	

No.	Result	Record	Opponent	Type	Round, time	Date	Location	Notes
30	Loss	26–3–1	Srisaket Sor Rungvisai	TKO	8 (12)	2013-05-03	Khonmuangsri Stadium, Si Sa Ket, Thailand	Lost WBC super flyweight title
29	Win	26–2–1	Ryo Akaho	UD	12 (12)	2012-12-31	Ota City General Gymnasium, Tokyo, Japan	Retained WBC super flyweight title
28	Win	25–2–1	Sylvester Lopez	UD	12 (12)	2012-07-08	Bunka Gym, Yokohama, Japan	Retained WBC super flyweight title
27	Win	24–2–1	Suriyan Sor Rungvisai	UD	12 (12)	2012-03-27	Korakuen Hall, Tokyo, Japan	Won WBC super flyweight title
26	Win	23–2–1	Kenji Oba	TKO	4 (10)	2011-11-01	Korakuen Hall, Tokyo, Japan	Retained Japanese super flyweight title
25	Win	22–2–1	Yoshihito Ishizaki	UD	10 (10)	2011-08-04	Korakuen Hall, Tokyo, Japan	Retained Japanese super flyweight title
24	Win	21–2–1	Kohei Kono	UD	10 (10)	2011-04-09	Korakuen Hall, Tokyo, Japan	Retained Japanese super flyweight title
23	Win	20–2–1	Yuki Fukumoto	TKO	7 (10)	2010-12-06	Korakuen Hall, Tokyo, Japan	Retained Japanese super flyweight title
22	Win	19–2–1	Daigo Nakahiro	UD	10 (10)	2010-09-25	Tokyo Big Sight, Tokyo, Japan	Won Japanese super flyweight title
21	Win	18–2–1	Go Onaga	TKO	7 (10)	2010-05-01	Korakuen Hall, Tokyo, Japan	Won interim Japanese super flyweight title
20	Win	17–2–1	Junichiro Sugita	TKO	7 (8)	2009-10-11	Korakuen Hall, Tokyo, Japan	
19	Draw	16–2–1	Jerope Mercado	SD	6 (6)	2009-07-03	Korakuen Hall, Tokyo, Japan	
18	Win	16–2	Kazuaki Shirai	TKO	1 (8)	2009-03-03	Korakuen Hall, Tokyo, Japan	
17	Win	15–2	Yasuaki Ohara	UD	8 (8)	2008-10-12	Korakuen Hall, Tokyo, Japan	
16	Win	14–2	Seiichi Haraguchi	KO	2 (8)	2008-07-09	Korakuen Hall, Tokyo, Japan	
15	Win	13–2	Petchklongphai Sor Thantip	KO	3 (10)	2008-03-22	Makuhari Messe, Chiba City, Japan	
14	Win	12–2	Yasutaka Ishimoto	UD	8 (8)	2007-12-19	Korakuen Hall, Tokyo, Japan	
13	Win	11–2	Mamoru Murohashi	UD	8 (8)	2007-09-08	Korakuen Hall, Tokyo, Japan	
12	Win	10–2	Masafumi Tonomura	UD	8 (8)	2007-06-18	Korakuen Hall, Tokyo, Japan	
11	Win	9–2	Priyaphong Yansa	TKO	1 (8)	2007-04-16	Korakuen Hall, Tokyo, Japan	
10	Win	8–2	Masafumi Tonomura	UD	6 (6)	2006-05-15	Korakuen Hall, Tokyo, Japan	
9	Win	7–2	Shigeki Hanawa	UD	6 (6)	2006-03-20	Korakuen Hall, Tokyo, Japan	
8	Win	6–2	Yoshiaki Yamada	UD	6 (6)	2005-12-19	Korakuen Hall, Tokyo, Japan	
7	Loss	5–2	Junichiro Sugita	UD	4 (4)	2005-09-28	Korakuen Hall, Tokyo, Japan	
6	Win	5–1	Koki Tabata	TKO	1 (4)	2005-08-05	Korakuen Hall, Tokyo, Japan	
5	Win	4–1	Yoshinao Yoshizawa	KO	1 (4)	2005-05-27	Korakuen Hall, Tokyo, Japan	
4	Win	3–1	Yuichi Hina	KO	2 (4)	2005-03-25	Korakuen Hall, Tokyo, Japan	
3	Win	2–1	Takashi Ueki	UD	4 (4)	2004-10-04	Korakuen Hall, Tokyo, Japan	
2	Win	1–1	Satoshi Matsui	TKO	3 (4)	2004-07-12	Korakuen Hall, Tokyo, Japan	
1	Loss	0–1	Kazuki Yamato	SD	4 (4)	2004-02-16	Korakuen Hall, Tokyo, Japan	

== See also ==
- Boxing in Japan
- List of Japanese boxing world champions
- List of world super-flyweight boxing champions

Sporting positions
Regional boxing titles
New title	Japanese super flyweight champion Interim title May 1, 2010 – September 25, 2010; Won full title	Vacant
Preceded by Daigo Nakahiro	Japanese super flyweight champion September 25, 2010 – 2012; Vacated	Vacant Title next held by Teiru Kinoshita
World boxing titles
Preceded by Suriyan Sor Rungvisai	WBC super flyweight champion March 27, 2012 – May 3, 2013	Succeeded by Srisaket Sor Rungvisai
