= The Morakestra =

- Current logo of The Morakestra made by Daniel Pérlaky of City On Fire Multidisciplinary Visual Communication Studios.

Background information
- Origin: El Paso, Texas, United States
- Genres: Alternative rock, experimental rock, indie rock
- Years active: 2000 – present
- Label: Stratking Records
- Members: William Mora-Lead Vocals, Guitar; David Mora-Vocals, Guitar; Libby Angstrom a.k.a. Kron X-Bass; Jerry Palvino-Drums
- Website: morakestra.com

The Morakestra is an American rock band that was formed in El Paso, Texas 2000. The band started gaining attention in the mainstream music scene after the release of their second album Witness To Connection. The album was produced by Jim Ward (musician), and Gabriel Gonzalez of Sparta (band); and, it has been acclaimed by several reviewers because of its "addictive guitar riffs" and multi-genre nature. The band has been categorized as a British music band by some reviewers because of their guitar style and lyrics. The band often performs with Fender equipment consisting of two Fender Stratocaster electric guitars. The band started promoting their second album in 2009.

== History ==
The band was formed around the year 2000, after twin brothers William and David Mora, with their cousin Paul Mora started an instrumental band called "The Mora's Band". In 2002 the twin brothers moved to Austin, TX to attend St. Edward's University; during this time original compositions were made, and the twin brothers played acoustically in local venues such as "Emo's" in Austin, TX. William Mora suffered an accident and broke both of his wrists in 2003, due to this event the band stopped playing. In 2006 after finishing studies and William Mora recovering the band decided to record its first full-length album. Live From Moraq, it was recorded in Pedernales Studio, Willie Nelson's recording studio in Austin, TX. The album was recorded with different session musicians including Robert Palmer's longtime drummer Dony Wynn. The album had a concept of showcasing the music of the Mora's; hence the name which makes allusion of transmitting music live from another planet. It is made up of heavy musical experimentation such as off time playing, different tuning and keys for the recording. Several guitar tracks were recorded for a single song each with a different key and tuning. The album is influenced by El Paso, TX band The Mars Volta. The album was released in 2007 and the live performance of "Live From Moraq" consisted of musicians William and David Mora on guitars with Wolf Garret on bass and Jerry Palvino on drums.

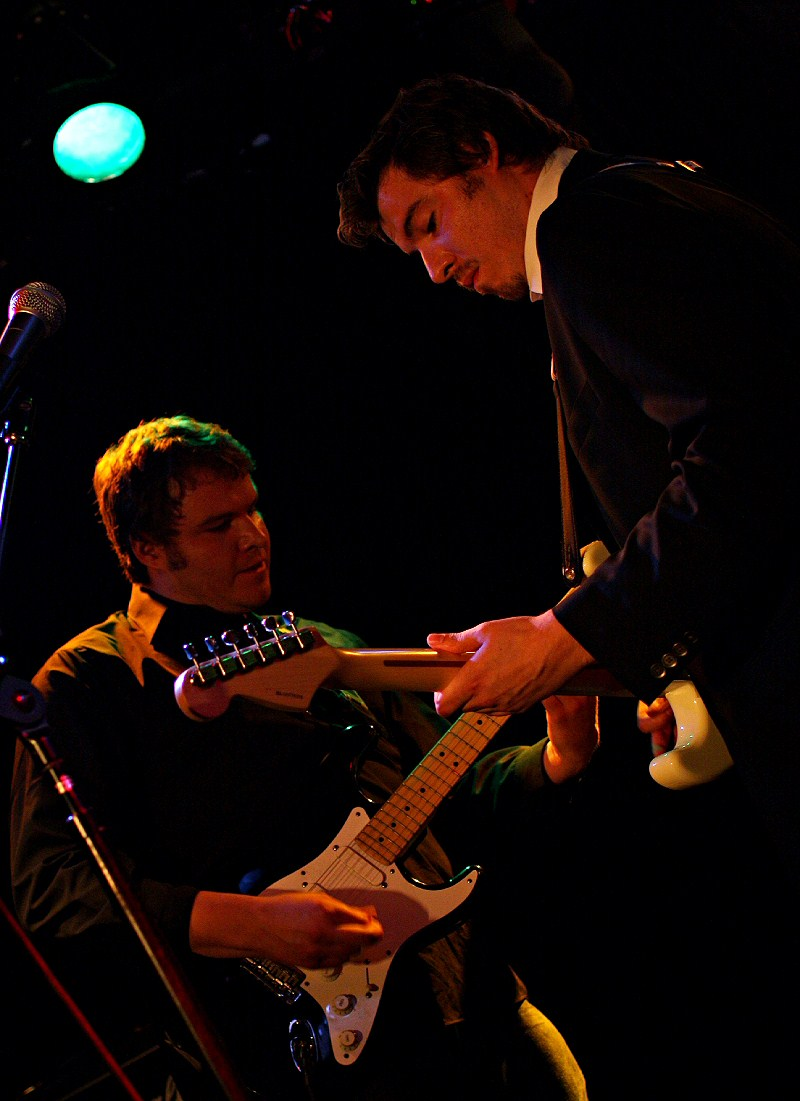
The Morakestra's David Mora and William Mora at the Viper Room in Los Angeles, California, 2009.

The second album named "Witness To Connection" was recorded at Sonic Ranch recording studios in Tornillo, Texas with Jim Ward and Gabriel Gonzalez from the band Sparta. The musical composition emphasized the creation of melodic songs with simple but interesting guitar pieces being followed by catchy guitar riffs and emotional lyrics. The album Witness To Connection was guided by artistic direction from Jim Ward. The album is influenced by instrumental roots of the 60's and 70's. The band was recently featured in the Texas Music Magazine where a description of the process of making Witness to Connection is featured. Likewise the Austin Deli Magazine has been ranking Morakestra' in the 10 most popular bands in Austin, Texas in their top 300 list of the most popular bands in Austin, Texas ranked by popularity since the release of the album, the band has on several occasions been ranked the number one band in this category. El Paso Music Magazine "Make El Paso Music" also featured the band in an article in said magazine. The band released a music video of the single Tell You Something directed by Tao Ruspoli director of Fix, the video was recorded in Los Angeles, California and Salton City, California. CSI: Miami actress Megalyn Echikunwoke is featured as the mysterious woman that guides the child in the video in a journey to find himself.

In February 2009 The Morakestra recorded its album "Witness To Connection." The Morakestra embarked on a small-scale publicity tour during the summer of 2009 and played in several different venues in the United States such as: The Viper Room, Whisky a Go Go, the Troubadour, House of Blues at Dallas, Texas and had the honor playing in the same venue with The Black and White Years the event which was the official release concert; radio airplay in different cities of the United States was also achieved during this period. The Morakestra has finished their new album named Glass Ships and Bullet Trains The album was recorded and produced by Justin Leah.In October 2011 the Morakestra began rehearsals in New Orleans, Louisiana. The Morakestra is preparing for future shows scheduled in December 2011.

== Discography ==
- Tension Span EP (2005)
- Live From Moraq (2008)
- Witness To Connection (2009)
- Glass Ships And Bullet Trains (2011)
- Texas Single (2013)
