= Cameron Hammond =

Aboriginal Australian boxer

Cameron James Hammond
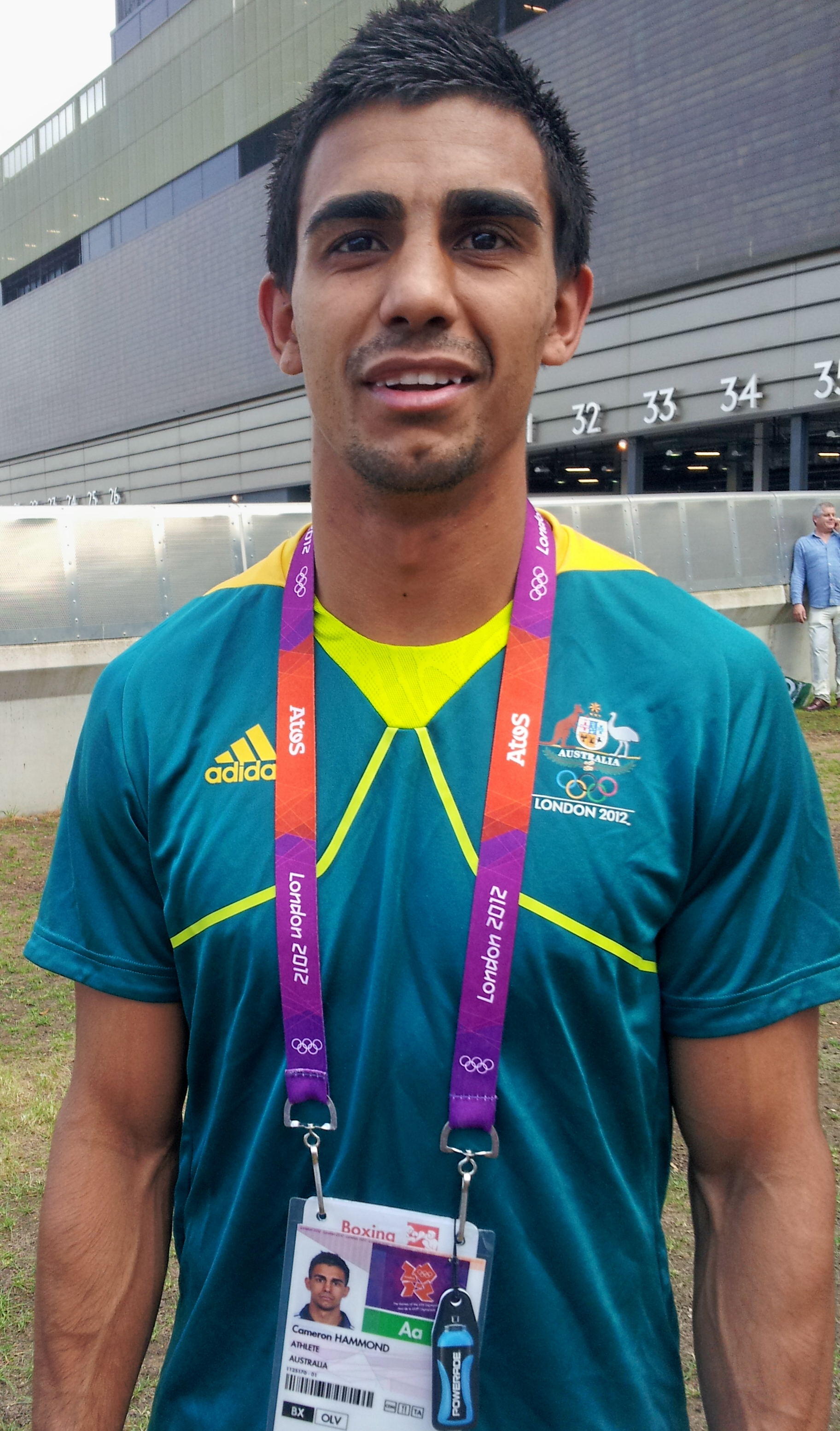

Personal information
- Nickname: Hammer
- Nationality: Australian
- Born: Cameron James Hammond; 20 September 1989 (age 36) Moree, New South Wales, Australia
- Height: 179 cm (5 ft 10 in) 5' 10½″
- Weight: Welterweight

Boxing career
- Stance: Orthodox

Boxing record
- Total fights: 20
- Wins: 18
- Win by KO: 9
- Losses: 2

Cameron Hammond (born 20 September 1989 in Moree, New South Wales) is an Aboriginal professional boxer who represented Australia at the 2010 Commonwealth Games in New Delhi, India and the 2012 Summer Olympics in the middleweight division.

== Background ==
Hammond played rugby league from the age of nine before discovering a talent for boxing when he followed a friend to the Moree PCYC at the age of 14. Cameron was an all round sportsman in primary and high school days. At the primary school level he competed in events such as rugby league, union, touch football, 100m, cross country, 400m, and swimming, where he won the aged championship and also aged champion for athletics. Cameron continued his love of sport into high school, as he was cross country champion for his age group, and swimming champion. He also competed in the local squash competition, where he was a winner in the (doubles) in the winter/summer competition. Also Cameron played rugby union in the U17's. Cameron has been into competitive sports since attending school and continues today. He comes from a family of three boys, and is the middle child. His two brothers are Wayne (eldest) and Trent (youngest). His mother Vicki has raised the boys on her own. Cameron's grandparents, Yvonne and Ronald 'Spoto' Hammond, are his biggest supporters, along with mother and brothers and also Cameron's five aunts and uncles, and all his cousins.

== Amateur career ==
He received a scholarship in 2007 to the Australian Institute of Sport through the National Indigenous Talent Development program. Since receiving the scholarship, Cameron has not looked back. His goals were to represent Australia at the Commonwealth and Olympic games, he achieved both goals. He is recognized in the Australian Olympic Committee list of Australian Indigenous Olympians.

== Pro career ==
After both the Commonwealth and Olympic games, his goal was to turn professional. Cameron has had several pro fights and an 18/1 record and is one of Australia top prospects in the Welterweight division. After losing a unanimous decision to Kris George in 2016 for the Commonwealth welterweight title, Hammond took a year and half hiatus from boxing only to come back in 2018 with TKO over Thai-born Australian Apichat Koedchatturat. He is trained by Glenn Rushton same trainer as Jeff Horn fellow Olympian and team mate.

== Professional record ==
17 wins (9 knockouts, 8 decision), 1 loss, 0 draws
Res.	Record	Opponent	Type	Round	Date	Location	Notes
Win	18-1	Frank Rojas	UD	10 (10)	2018-11-30	Suncorp Stadium, Brisbane	vacant World Boxing Association Oceania Welterweight Title
Win	17-1	Aphichat Koedchatturat	TKO	2 (10)	2018-06-29	Pullman & Mercure, King George Square, Brisbane	
Loss	16-1	Kris George	UD	12 (12)	2016-11-25	Rumours International, Toowoomba, Queensland, Australia	vacant Commonwealth (British Empire) Welterweight Title
Win	16-0	Devdarshan Singh	UD	6 (6)	2016-07-16	Thyagaraj Stadium, New Delhi	
Win	15-0	Sahlan Coral	UD	6 (6)	2015-11-11	Convention & Exhibition Centre, Melbourne	
Win	14-0	unknown	KO	7 (8)	2015-10-03	Alexandria Basketball Stadium, Perry Park, Australia	
Win	13-0	Sedat Tasci	TKO	4 (10)	2015-05-23	The Sands Tavern, Maroochydore, Queensland, Australia	WBA Oceania welterweight title
Win	12-0	Jese Ravudi	TKO	5 (10)	2015-07-25	Crossing Theatre, Narrabri, New South Wales, Australia	WBA Oceania welterweight title
Win	11-0	Romeo Jakosalem	TKO	9 (10)	2014-11-08	Sleeman Sports Complex - Theatre, Chandler, Queensland, Australia	vacant WBC Eurasia Pacific Boxing Council welterweight title & WBA Oceania welterweight title
Win	10-0	Alfredo Rodolfo Blanco	UD	10 (10)	2014-07-05	Town Hall, Moree, New South Wales, Australia	vacant WBA Oceania welterweight title
Win	9-0	Pramool Boonpok	UD	6 (6)	2014-04-09	Entertainment Centre, Newcastle, New South Wales, Australia	
Win	8-0	Michael Correa	RTD	4 (6)	2014-03-08	Mansfield Tavern, Mansfield, Queensland, Australia	
Win	7-0	Pramool Boonpok	UD	4 (4)	2014-01-29	Brisbane Entertainment Centre, Boondall, Queensland, Australia	
Win	6-0	Dennapa Bigshotcamp	UD	6 (6)	2013-12-11	The Melbourne Pavilion, Flemington, Victoria, Australia	
Win	5-0	Joel Dela Cruz	UD	8 (8)	2013-11-16	Royal International Convention Centre, Brisbane, Queensland, Australia	
Win	4-0	Jody Allen	TKO	4 (6)	2013-09-27	RSL Club, Dubbo, New South Wales, Australia	
Win	3-0	Kane Buckley	TKO	6 (6)	2013-07-13	Town Hall, Moree, New South Wales, Australia	
Win	2-0	Daniel Roy Maxwell	UD	6 (6)	2013-04-20	Royal International Convention Centre, Brisbane, Queensland, Australia	
Win	1-0	Zhi Xiang Jiang	TKO	2 (6)	2012-12-11	Convention Towers and Exhibition Center, Hong Kong S.A.R., China	
