= Xu Can =

Chinese boxer (born 1994)

Personal information
- Nickname: Fake Monster
- Born: 徐灿; March 9, 1994 (age 32) Fuzhou, Jiangxi, China
- Height: 5 ft 9 in (175 cm)
- Weight: Featherweight; Super-featherweight; Light-welterweight

Boxing career
- Reach: 69 in (175 cm)
- Stance: Orthodox

Boxing record
- Total fights: 25
- Wins: 21
- Win by KO: 5
- Losses: 4

Xu Can (simplified Chinese: 徐灿; traditional Chinese: 徐燦; pinyin: Xú Càn; born March 9, 1994) is a Chinese professional boxer who held the World Boxing Association (WBA) (Regular version) featherweight title from 2019 to 2021.

== Professional career ==
=== Early career ===
Xu turned professional in 2013. His first 14 fights ended in decision, of which he was victorious in 12 of them. In his 15th fight on October 3, 2017, he recorded his first stoppage win against former WBA (Regular) super bantamweight champion Nehomar Cermeño, prevailing via seventh-round corner retirement. The win saw Xu capture the vacant WBA International featherweight title.

=== WBA (Regular) featherweight champion ===
==== Xu vs. Rojas ====
Xu was rewarded for his twelve fight winning streak with the opportunity to challenge the reigning WBA (Regular) featherweight champion Jesús Rojas. The bout was scheduled for the undercard of the Jaime Munguia and Takeshi Inoue WBO super-welterweight title fight, which took place at the Toyota Center in Houston, Texas, on January 26, 2019, and was broadcast by DAZN and Canal Space. Xu won the fight, which BoxingScene dubbed an early candidate for "Fight of the Year", by unanimous decision. He was awarded scorecards of 116–112, 117–111 and 118–110. Both fighters threw a combined 2574 strikes total, with Xu landing 380 and Rojas 388 total punches. Xu became only the third Chinese world boxing champion, after Xiong Chaozhong and Zou Shiming.

==== Xu vs. Kubo ====
Xu made his first title defense against the former WBA Regular Super Bantamweight champion Shun Kubo on May 26, 2019, at the Fuzhou Sports Center Gymnasium in his native Fuzhou, Jiangxi. He successfully retained his title with a sixth-round technical knockout of Kubo. Xu first knocked Kubo down near the end of the third round, before stopping the Japanese challenger with a flurry of punches at the 1:16 minute mark of the sixth round.

==== Xu vs. Robles III ====
In his next title defense, Xu defeated Manny Robles III by unanimous decision, with scores of 120–108, 119–109, 118–110, on November 23.

==== Failed Warrington negotiations ====
Talks were held in 2020 and early 2021 to try to make Xu's third defense of his title against the IBF champion at the time, Josh Warrington. However, the fight was postponed due to disagreements from both sides: Xu wanted fans present at the fight, and Warrington refused to leave the United Kingdom to fight on Chinese soil. The chances of Xu and Warrington ever fighting were dramatically reduced when Warrington subsequently vacated his IBF title and then lost to the unheralded Mauricio Lara in February 2021, when he was sensationally knocked out by Lara in an upset defeat.

==== Xu vs. Wood ====
On July 6, 2021, it was announced that Xu would be defending his WBA (Regular) title against British featherweight champion Leigh Wood in Brentwood, England on July 31 as part of Matchroom's Fight Camp. Despite being a -350 favorite, Xu was outboxed during periods of the fight, and suffered an upset defeat via twelfth-round technical knockout.

=== Post-title career ===
Xu would next return to the ring on October 7, 2022 to face Brandon Leon Benitez in Plant City, Florida. Xu suffered his second consecutive loss, via split decision; one judge scored the bout 97–93 in Xu's favor, but he was overruled by the other two judges who both scored the bout 96–94 for Benitez.

== Personal life ==
Xu was born in Fuzhou, Jiangxi, and has since moved his residence to Beijing. His parents were pastry-makers, and he was encouraged by his father to pursue a career in boxing. When Xu dropped out of junior high school during his third year, he joined China's only professional boxing club at the time, named Zhongwei, in Kunming, Yunnan where he began training as a boxer.

== Professional boxing record ==
25 fights	21 wins	4 losses
By knockout	5	1
By decision	16	3

No.	Result	Record	Opponent	Type	Round, time	Date	Location	Notes
25	Win	21–4	Jaouad Belmehdi	UD	12	Aug 15, 2025	Beijing, China	Retained IBO International super featherweight title
24	Win	20–4	Jhonatan Arenas	TKO	9 (10), 1:01	Dec 14, 2024	Grand Hyatt Baha Mar, Nassau, Bahamas	Won vacant IBO International super featherweight title
23	Win	19–4	Asad Asif Khan	KO	5 (10), 1:23	Dec 31, 2023	Shangluo, China	
22	Loss	18–4	Brandon Leon Benitez	SD	10	Oct 7, 2022	Whitesands Events Center, Plant City, Florida, U.S.	
21	Loss	18–3	Leigh Wood	TKO	12 (12), 2:43	Jul 31, 2021	Matchroom Headquarters, Brentwood, England	Lost WBA (Regular) featherweight title
20	Win	18–2	Manny Robles III	UD	12	Nov 23, 2019	Fantasy Springs Resort Casino, Indio, California, U.S.	Retained WBA (Regular) featherweight title
19	Win	17–2	Shun Kubo	TKO	6 (12), 1:16	May 26, 2019	Fuzhou Sports Center Gymnasium, Fuzhou, Jiangxi, China	Retained WBA (Regular) featherweight title
18	Win	16–2	Jesús Rojas	UD	12	Jan 26, 2019	Toyota Center, Houston, Texas, U.S.	Won WBA (Regular) featherweight title
17	Win	15–2	Enrique Bernache	SD	8	Sep 13, 2018	The Joint, Las Vegas, Nevada, U.S.	
16	Win	14–2	Jelbirt Gomera	TKO	7 (10), 2:22	Jul 27, 2018	Qingdao Guosen Gymnasium, Qingdao, China	
15	Win	13–2	Nehomar Cermeño	RTD	7 (12), 3:00	Oct 3, 2017	Gym of Datong University, Datong, China	Won WBA International featherweight title
14	Win	12–2	Jack Asis	UD	12	May 7, 2017	Shaanxi Normal University Stadium, Xi'an, China	Retained WBA International super-featherweight title
13	Win	11–2	Spicy Matsushita	UD	12	Dec 17, 2016	Zhejiang University Stadium, Hangzhou, China	Won vacant WBA International super-featherweight title
12	Win	10–2	Ramiro Blanco	UD	12	Sep 30, 2016	Wenzhou Gymnasium, Wenzhou, China	Retained WBA International super-featherweight title
11	Win	9–2	Corey McConnell	UD	12	Jun 24, 2016	Capital Indoor Stadium, Beijing, China	Retained WBA Oceania and WBA International super-featherweight titles
10	Win	8–2	Isaias Santos Sampaio	UD	12	Feb 12, 2016	Olympic Park Arena, Luzhou, China	Retained WBA Oceania super-featherweight title; Won vacant WBA International super-featherweight title
9	Win	7–2	Chaiyong Chanthahong	UD	10	Sep 18, 2015	Yageer Gymnasium, Ningbo, China	Won WBA Oceania super-featherweight title
8	Win	6–2	Kris George	UD	10	Jun 27, 2015	Rumours International, Toowoomba, Australia	Won WBA Oceania super-lightweight title
7	Win	5–2	Hurricane Futa	UD	6	May 8, 2015	EXPO Garden Hotel, Kunming, China	
6	Win	4–2	Josh Baillie	MD	6	Feb 22, 2015	Wenshan, China	
5	Loss	3–2	Bao Dong	MD	6	Sep 8, 2014	World Horti-Expo Garden, Kunming, China	
4	Win	3–1	Hongpeng Zhang	UD	4	Aug 23, 2014	Expo Garden Hotel, Kunming, China	
3	Loss	2–1	Neeraj Goyat	SD	4	Jun 7, 2014	World Horti-Expo Garden, Kunming, China	
2	Win	2–0	Kota Hamamoto	UD	4	Apr 13, 2014	Sangyo Hall, Kanazawa, Japan	
1	Win	1–0	Tang Yuan Yuan	UD	4	Nov 16, 2013	Yu Hang Gymnasium, Hangzhou, China	

== See also ==
- List of featherweight boxing champions
- List of WBA world champions

Sporting positions
Regional boxing titles
Preceded by Kris George	WBA Oceania super-lightweight champion June 27, 2015 – August 2015; Vacated	Vacant Title next held by Darragh Foley
Preceded by Chaiyong Chanthahong	WBA Oceania super-featherweight champion September 18, 2015 – September 2016; Vacated	Vacant Title next held by Billel Dib
Vacant Title last held by Dardan Zenunaj	WBA International super-featherweight champion February 12, 2016 – October 2016	Vacant Title next held by Himself
Vacant Title last held by Himself	WBA International super-featherweight champion December 17, 2016 – June 2017; Vacated	Vacant Title next held by James Tennyson
Vacant Title last held by Scott Quigg	WBA International featherweight champion October 3, 2017 – 2018	Vacant Title next held by Jordan Gill
World boxing titles
Preceded by Jesús Rojas	WBA featherweight champion Regular title January 26, 2019 – July 31, 2021	Succeeded by Leigh Wood
