= Anselmo Moreno =

Panamanian boxer

Personal information
- Nicknames: Chemito; El Fantasma ("The Phantom")
- Born: 28 June 1985 (age 41) El Martillo, San Miguelito, Panama
- Height: 168 cm (5 ft 6 in)
- Weight: Super flyweight; Bantamweight; Super bantamweight

Boxing career
- Reach: 177 cm (70 in)
- Stance: Southpaw

Boxing record
- Total fights: 49
- Wins: 42
- Win by KO: 15
- Losses: 6
- Draws: 1

Anselmo Moreno (born 28 June 1985) is a Panamanian professional boxer. He held the WBA bantamweight title from 2008 to 2014 (promoted to super champion status in 2011), making him the longest reigning bantamweight world champion of all time, and challenged once for the WBC super bantamweight title in 2012. Nicknamed El Fantasma ("The Phantom"), Moreno is known for his excellent defensive skills and technical fighting style.

== Professional career ==
=== Early career ===
==== Super-flyweight ====
Moreno made his professional debut against Hussein Sanchez on 10 March 2002. He won the fight by unanimous decision. Moreno amassed a 10–1–1 record during the next three years, with three stoppage victories, before being scheduled to face Ricardo Molina for the vacant WBA Fedecentro super flyweight title on 28 January 2005. He won the fight by a ninth-round technical knockout. The two fought an immediate rematch on 20 August 2005, with the WBA Fedecentro and Panamian super-flyweight titles on the line. Moreno won the fight by unanimous decision.

==== Move to bantamweight ====
Moreno moved up to bantamweight for the next fight, as he faced Yogli Herrera on 21 March 2006. He won the fight by unanimous decision, with scores of 100–89, 100–89 and 99–89. Herrera was deducted two points for illegal blows, once in the fourth and once in the eight round. Moreno was next scheduled to face Félix Machado for the vacant WBA Fedecentro and WBA Fedebol bantamweight titles on 5 May 2006, his first title fight at a new weight. He won the fight by unanimous decision, with scores of 98–91, 97–94 and 99–91. Machado was deducted a point in the sixth round for an illegal blow. After a quick fifth-round technical knockout of Jose de Jesus Lopez on 5 August 2006, Moreno was booked to make his first title defense against Franklin Varela on 2 September 2006. He won the fight by unanimous decision, with scores of 98–92, 100–90 and 99–91.

After beating the overmatched Eduardo Pacheco by technical knockout on 7 December 2006, Moreno was booked to fight Nestor Hugo Paniagua for the vacant WBA Fedecaribe bantamweight title on 3 February 2007. He won the fight by unanimous decision, with scores of 100–89, 100–90 and 100–88. Moreno made the first defense of his newly acquired regional title against Tomás Rojas on 2 June 2007. He won the fight by unanimous decision, with scores of 98–92, 99–92 and 98–94. Moreno made his second and final title defense against Ricardo Vargas on 16 August 2007, whom he beat by a first-round technical knockout.

=== WBA bantamweight champion ===
Moreno was rewarded for his run of victories by being scheduled to challenge the reigning WBA bantamweight champion Volodymyr Sydorenko. The title fight was booked as the main event of a 31 May 2008, ZDF broadcast card, which took place at the Burg-Wächter Castello in Düsseldorf, Germany. Moreno won the fight by split decision. Two of the judges scored the fight 115–113 for him, while the third judge awarded the same scorecard to Sydorenko.

Moreno made his second title defense against Rolly Matsushita on 30 October 2008, at the Figali Convention Center in Panama City, Panama. He won the fight by unanimous decision, with scores of 119–109, 118–110 and 120–108. Moreno fought a rematch with Volodymyr Sydorenko in his third WBA title defense. The fight was scheduled for 2 May 2009, at the Halle 7 in Bremen, Germany, and was once again broadcast by ZDF. Although the bout was closer than their first meeting, Moreno was once again victorious. He won the fight by split decision, with scores of 115–113, 115–113 and 113–115. Moreno made his third title defense against Mahyar Monshipour on 4 July 2009, at the Parc des Expositions in Poitiers, France. Moreno once again won the fight by split decision, with scores of 116–112, 113–115 and 116–113.

After beating Jorge Otero by a sixth-round technical knockout on 9 October 2009, Moreno was booked to make his fourth title defense against Frédéric Patrac on 4 December 2009, at the Palais des Sports in Agde, France. He won the fight by a later eleventh-round technical knockout, stopping Patrac with four seconds to spare. More made his fifth WBA Regular title defense against the undefeated interim-champion Nehomar Cermeño on 27 March 2010, at the Polideportivo José María Vargas in La Guaira, Venezuela. He won the fight by split decision. Two judges scored the fight 114–113 and 115–112 for the reigning champion, while the third judge scored it 115–112 for the challenger. The pair fought an immediate rematch on 14 August 2010, with the bout taking place in the champion's native Panama this time around. More again won the fight by split decision.

Moreno, who had at that point been promoted to the status of WBA "Super" bantamweight champion, made the first defense of the Super title against Lorenzo Parra at the Roberto Durán Arena in Panama City, Panama. He had no trouble with the challenger, who retired from the bout at the end of the eight round. Moreno was booked to make his second title defense against Vic Darchinyan on 3 December 2011. The fight presented Moreno's United States debut, as it took place at the Honda Center in Anaheim, California. He won the fight unanimous decision, with scores of 120–107, 117–110 and 116–111. Moreno made his third title defense against David de la Mora on 12 April 2012. He won the fight by a ninth-round technical knockout.

Moreno moved up in weight to super bantamweight for his next bout, in order to challenge the reigning WBC champion Abner Mares. The title fight was scheduled as the event headliner of the 10 November 2012 Showtime card, which took place at the Staples Center in Los Angeles, California. Mares won the fight by unanimous decision, with two judges scoring the fight 116–110 in his favor, while the third judge awarded him a wider scorecard of 120–106. Moreno was knocked down in the fifth round, and was deducted a point in the eleventh round for pulling down the head of Mares.

Moreno then returned to bantamweight, in order to make his fourth WBA Super title defense. Their fight was booked for 10 August 2013, at the Megapolis Convention Center in Panama City, Panama. He won the fight by unanimous decision, with two judges scoring the fight 118–110 for him, while the third judge scored it 116–112 for Moreno. Moreno made his fifth title defense against Javier Nicolas Chacon on 22 March 2014. He won the fight by unanimous decision.

Moreno was booked to make his sixth title defense against Juan Carlos Payano. The fight took place on 26 September 2014, at the Mesquite Arena in Mesquite, Texas, and was broadcast by Fox Sports. The fight was stopped in the sixth round, due to a cut which was caused by an accidental clash of heads in the second round, and which worsened as the bout went on. Payano was awarded the technical decision, with scores of 59–55, 58–56 and 58–55.

=== Later career ===
Moreno returned to competition a year later, in order to challenge the reigning WBC bantamweight champion Shinsuke Yamanaka. The fight took place at the Ota City General Gymnasium in Tokyo, Japan on 22 September 2015. Yamanaka won the fight by a narrow split decision. All three judges scored the fight 115–113, with two of them scoring it in favor of Yamanaka and the third in favor of Moreno. After suffering his fourth professional loss, Moreno faced the former WBC super flyweight champion Suriyan Sor Rungvisai on 1 May 2016. He won the fight by unanimous decision, with scores of 117–110, 116–111 and 117–110. After successfully bouncing back, Moreno was booked to rematch the WBC bantamweight champion Shinsuke Yamanaka on 16 September 2016. Aside from the WBC title, the vacant The Ring title was on the line as well. Yamanaka was more convincing in the rematch, winning the fight by a seventh-round technical knockout.

Moreno then returned to super bantamweight, to fight Julio Ceja for the vacant WBC Silver super bantamweight title on 27 May 2017. Ceja won the fight by a quick third-round knockout. On 3 June 2017, Moreno officially announced his retirement from the sport, after suffering his fourth loss in his previous five fights.

==== Move to featherweight ====
On 9 April 2019, it was revealed that Moreno would return from retirement and beginning competing at featherweight. Moreno was booked to face Daniel Colula on 30 April 2019, following a 23 month absence from the sport. He won the fight by unanimous decision, with scores of 79–72, 77–74 and 78–73. Moreno was next booked to face Luis Nino on 27 November 2019. He won by an eight-round disqualification. Referee Ivan Ballesteros disqualified Nino for an evident low blow.

Moreno faced Ruben Tostado Garcia for the vacant WBA Fedelatin featherweight title on 21 May 2021. He won the fight by unanimous decision, with scores of 100–90, 96–94 and 100–90. Moreno made his first title defense against Walberto Ramos on 15 October 2021. He won the fight by a first-round knockout. Moreno was booked to make his second WBA Fedelatin title defense against Gustavo Pina Melgar on 12 March 2022. He won the fight by a tenth-round technical knockout. Moreno faced Julio Cesar Cruz Avendano on 15 October 2022, in his second and final professional appearance of the year. He won the fight by a first-round knockout.

== Professional boxing record ==
51 fights	43 wins	7 losses
By knockout	15	3
By decision	27	4
By disqualification	1	0
Draws	1	

No.	Result	Record	Opponent	Type	Round, time	Date	Location	Notes
51	Loss	43–7–1	Hayato Tsutsumi	KO	3 (10), 2:45	17 Apr 2024	Korakuen Hall, Tokyo, Japan	
50	Win	43–6–1	Hugo Berrio	UD	8	13 Mar 2023	Roberto Durán Arena, Panama City, Panama	
49	Win	42–6–1	Julio Cesar Cruz Avendano	KO	1 (8), 2:37	15 Oct 2022	Hotel El Panama, Panama City, Panama	
48	Win	41–6–1	Gustavo Pina Melgar	TKO	10 (10), 1:23	12 Mar 2022	Roberto Durán Arena, Panama City, Panama	Retained WBA Fedelatin featherweight title
47	Win	40–6–1	Walberto Ramos	KO	1 (10), 1:25	15 Oct 2021	Los Andes Mall, Panama City, Panama	Retained WBA Fedelatin featherweight title
46	Win	39–6–1	Ruben Tostado Garcia	UD	10	21 May 2021	Los Andes Mall, Panama City, Panama	Won vacant WBA Fedelatin featherweight title
45	Win	38–6–1	Luis Nino	DQ	8 (10), 0:26	27 Nov 2019	Hotel El Panama, Panama City, Panama	Nino disqualified for an intentional low blow
44	Win	37–6–1	Daniel Colula	UD	8	30 Apr 2019	Roberto Durán Arena, Panama City, Panama	
43	Loss	36–6–1	Julio Ceja	KO	3 (12), 2:32	27 May 2017	Centro de Convenciones Amador, Panama City, Panama	For vacant WBC Silver super bantamweight title
42	Loss	36–5–1	Shinsuke Yamanaka	TKO	7 (12), 1:09	16 Sep 2016	Edion Arena, Osaka, Japan	For WBC and vacant The Ring bantamweight titles
41	Win	36–4–1	Suriyan Sor Rungvisai	UD	12	1 May 2016	Roberto Durán Arena, Panama City, Panama	Won vacant WBC Silver bantamweight title
40	Loss	35–4–1	Shinsuke Yamanaka	SD	12	22 Sep 2015	Ota City General Gymnasium, Tokyo, Japan	For WBC bantamweight title
39	Loss	35–3–1	Juan Carlos Payano	TD	6 (12)	26 Sep 2014	Mesquite Arena, Mesquite, Texas, U.S.	Lost WBA (Super) bantamweight title; Unanimous TD after Payano cut from accidental head clash
38	Win	35–2–1	Javier Nicolas Chacon	UD	12	22 Mar 2014	Roberto Durán Arena, Panama City, Panama	Retained WBA (Super) bantamweight title
37	Win	34–2–1	William Urina	UD	12	10 Aug 2013	Megapolis Convention Center, Panama City, Panama	Retained WBA (Super) bantamweight title
36	Loss	33–2–1	Abner Mares	UD	12	10 Nov 2012	Staples Center, Los Angeles, California, U.S.	For WBC super bantamweight title
35	Win	33–1–1	David de la Mora	TKO	9 (12), 0:10	21 Apr 2012	Don Haskins Center, El Paso, Texas, U.S.	Retained WBA (Super) bantamweight title
34	Win	32–1–1	Vic Darchinyan	UD	12	3 Dec 2011	Honda Center, Anaheim, California, U.S.	Retained WBA (Super) bantamweight title
33	Win	31–1–1	Lorenzo Parra	RTD	8 (12), 3:00	17 Jun 2011	Roberto Durán Arena, Panama City, Panama	Retained WBA (Super) bantamweight title
32	Win	30–1–1	Nehomar Cermeño	SD	12	14 Aug 2010	Roberto Durán Arena, Panama City, Panama	Retained WBA bantamweight title
31	Win	29–1–1	Nehomar Cermeño	SD	12	27 Mar 2010	Polideportivo José María Vargas, La Guaira, Venezuela	Retained WBA bantamweight title
30	Win	28–1–1	Frédéric Patrac	TKO	11 (12), 2:56	4 Dec 2009	Palais des Sports, Agde, France	Retained WBA bantamweight title
29	Win	27–1–1	Jorge Otero	TKO	6 (10), 2:13	9 Oct 2009	Roberto Durán Arena, Panama City, Panama	
28	Win	26–1–1	Mahyar Monshipour	SD	12	4 Jul 2009	Parc des Expositions, Poitiers, France	Retained WBA bantamweight title
27	Win	25–1–1	Volodymyr Sydorenko	SD	12	2 May 2009	Halle 7, Bremen, Germany	Retained WBA bantamweight title
26	Win	24–1–1	Rolly Matsushita	UD	12	30 Oct 2008	Figali Convention Center, Panama City, Panama	Retained WBA bantamweight title
25	Win	23–1–1	Cecilio Santos	TD	7 (12)	18 Sep 2008	Figali Convention Center, Panama City, Panama	Retained WBA bantamweight title; Unanimous TD after Santos cut from accidental head clash
24	Win	22–1–1	Volodymyr Sydorenko	UD	12	31 May 2008	Burg-Wächter Castello, Düsseldorf, Germany	Won WBA bantamweight title
23	Win	21–1–1	Ricardo Vargas	TKO	1 (10), 1:06	16 Aug 2007	Figali Convention Center, Panama City, Panama	Retained WBA Fedecaribe bantamweight title
22	Win	20–1–1	Tomás Rojas	UD	10	2 Jun 2007	Roberto Durán Arena, Panama City, Panama	Retained WBA Fedecaribe bantamweight title
21	Win	19–1–1	Luis Benavides	KO	2 (8), 2:44	24 Mar 2007	Figali Convention Center, Panama City, Panama	
20	Win	18–1–1	Nestor Hugo Paniagua	UD	10	3 Feb 2007	Figali Convention Center, Panama City, Panama	Won vacant WBA Fedecaribe bantamweight title
19	Win	17–1–1	Eduardo Pacheco	TKO	4 (10), 1:03	7 Dec 2006	Atlapa Convention Centre, Panama City, Panama	
18	Win	16–1–1	Franklin Varela	UD	10	2 Sep 2006	Caribe Convention Center, Port-au-Prince, Haiti	Retained WBA Fedecentro bantamweight title
17	Win	15–1–1	Jose de Jesus Lopez	TKO	5 (10)	5 Aug 2006	Figali Convention Center, Panama City, Panama	
16	Win	14–1–1	Félix Machado	UD	10	5 May 2006	Atlapa Convention Centre, Panama City, Panama	Won vacant WBA Fedecentro and WBA Fedebol bantamweight titles
15	Win	13–1–1	Yogli Herrera	UD	10	21 Mar 2006	Atlapa Convention Centre, Panama City, Panama	
14	Win	12–1–1	Ricardo Molina	UD	10	20 Aug 2005	Figali Convention Center, Panama City, Panama	Won WBA Fedecentro and Panamanian super flyweight titles
13	Win	11–1–1	Ricardo Molina	TKO	9 (10), 2:59	28 Jan 2005	Jardín El Suspiro, San Miguelito, Panama	Won vacant WBA Fedecentro super flyweight title
12	Win	10–1–1	Davis Arosemena	UD	6	13 Nov 2004	Jardín Nuevas Glorias Soberanas, Panama City, Panama	
11	Win	9–1–1	Saturnino Camacho	UD	8	30 Apr 2004	Jardín Nuevas Glorias Soberanas, Panama City, Panama	
10	Win	8–1–1	Alexander Murillo	TKO	2 (4), 1:17	16 May 2003	Arena Panama Al Brown, Colón, Panama	
9	Win	7–1–1	Saturnino Camacho	UD	6	3 May 2003	Jardín Nuevas Glorias Soberanas, Panama City, Panama	
8	Loss	6–1–1	Ricardo Molina	SD	4	26 Oct 2002	Gimnasio Municipal, Santiago de Veraguas, Panama	
7	Win	6–0–1	Juvencio Caballero	UD	4	14 Sep 2002	Gimnasio Escolar, David, Panama	
6	Draw	5–0–1	Javier Tello	SD	4	3 Aug 2002	Gimnasio Club de Leones, Soná, Panama	
5	Win	5–0	Hussein Sanchez	UD	4	18 May 2002	Rancho Local de La Mata, Bugaba, Panama	
4	Win	4–0	Anel Mitre	TKO	1 (4), 2:46	11 May 2002	Gimnasio Escolar, David, Panama	
3	Win	3–0	Juvencio Caballero	TKO	3 (4), 1:44	23 Mar 2002	Centro Recreativo del Educador, Penonomé, Panama	
2	Win	2–0	Harold Arosemena	UD	4	16 Mar 2002	Magnum Eventus, Panama City, Panama	
1	Win	1–0	Hussein Sanchez	UD	4	10 Mar 2002	Gimnasio Belisario Porras, Boquete, Panama	

Sporting positions
Regional boxing titles
Vacant Title last held by Reynaldo Lopez	WBA Fedecentro super flyweight champion 28 January 2005 – March 2005; Vacated	Vacant Title next held by Ricardo Molina
Preceded by Ricardo Molina	WBA Fedecentro super flyweight champion 20 August 2005 – May 2006; Vacated	Vacant Title next held by Jovanny Soto
Preceded by Ricardo Molina	Panamanian super flyweight champion 20 August 2005 – November 2011; Vacated	Vacant Title next held by Manuel Vides
Vacant Title last held by Jesus Antonio Rios	WBA Fedecentro bantamweight champion 5 May 2006 – 31 May 2008; Won world title	Vacant Title next held by Aron Juarez
Vacant Title last held by Francisco Soto	WBA Fedebol bantamweight champion 5 May 2006 – 31 May 2008; Won world title	Vacant Title next held by Yonfrez Parejo
Vacant Title last held by Adonis Rivas	WBA Fedecaribe bantamweight champion 3 February 2007 – 31 May 2008; Won world title	Vacant Title next held by Henry Maldonado
Vacant Title last held by Julio Ceja	WBC Silver bantamweight champion 1 May 2016 – 16 September 2016; Lost bid for world title	Vacant Title next held by Luis Nery
World boxing titles
Preceded by Volodymyr Sydorenko	WBA bantamweight champion 31 May 2008 – November 2010; Status changed	Succeeded by Himself as Champion
Preceded by Himself as Champion	WBA bantamweight champion Super title November 2010 – 26 September 2014	Succeeded by Juan Carlos Payano as Undisputed champion
