= Surachart Pisitwuttinan =

Thai boxing manager, trainer and promoter

- สุรชาติ พิสิฐวุฒินันท์
- Born: Suchart Pisitwuttinan c. 1950; Nonthaburi, Thailand
- Occupations: Professional boxing manager; trainer; promoter
- Years active: 1960s–present
- Organization: Nakornloung Boxing Promotion (NKL)
- Notable work: Román González vs. Srisaket Sor Rungvisai I Srisaket Sor Rungvisai vs. Román González II
- Television: WP Boxing
- Spouse: Pranee "Sor Lek" Pisitwuttinan
- Children: 4

Surachart Pisitwuttinan (Thai: สุรชาติ พิสิฐวุฒินันท์, formerly: "Suchart"; สุชาติ; born: c. 1950 in Nonthaburi province, central Thailand) is a Thai boxing manager, trainer and promoter. The founder and chairman of Nakornloung Boxing Promotion (NKL) based in Nonthaburi. He is familiarly known as "Sia Hui" (เสี่ยฮุย, lit. 'Tycoon Hui').

== Biography and careers ==
Surachart Pisitwuttinan was born into a Thai-Chinese family in Nonthaburi province, in the upper Bangkok Metropolitan Region. His family was involved in the entertainment business and owned several cinemas. From a young age, Surachart developed a passion for boxing, especially professional boxing. He frequently trained at Yontarakit, a well-known Muay Thai and professional boxing gym at the time, located near his hometown.

He competed in the Thailand National Games, where he won a gold medal in the bantamweight (118 lb) division. Afterward, he turned professional and scored six consecutive knockout wins at Lumpinee Stadium. He was also a sparring partner for Venice Borkhorsor, the WBC and Lineal flyweight (112 lb) world champion. He was regarded as a boxer with enough potential to become a world champion himself.

However, his father disapproved of his boxing career, fearing that he would suffer serious injuries. At the age of 18, Surachart was sent by his father to manage a cinema in Chachoengsao province. Despite this, he never completely left the boxing world. He remained an avid follower of the sport and regularly attended matches, staying informed and engaged in boxing circles.

In late 1986, after the bout between Gilberto Román and Kongtoranee Payakaroon for the WBC super flyweight (115 lb) title at Indoor Stadium Huamark in Bangkok, where Román emerged victorious, Surachart brought his eldest son, Chokchai "Pop," to sit on Román's lap for a photograph. He frequently took his son to boxing events. He had a dream that Chokchai would someday become the first Thai boxer to win an Olympic gold medal. He instilled a love of boxing in all of his children.

Surachart began his career as a boxing promoter in 1994, starting with Veeraphol Sahaprom. He later managed several other fighters such as Suvatchai Chalermsri, Chaosingthong Chalermsri, Samanchai Chalermsri, Daonuea Chalermsri (also known as Napapol Kiatisakchokchai), Thong Por Chokchai, and Sirimongkol Singwangcha, although the latter was with him for only a short period.

His Nakornloung Boxing Promotion stable has featured many prominent boxers, including Suriyan Sor Rungvisai, Nawaphon Sor Rungvisai, Srisaket Sor Rungvisai, and Pongsaklek Sithdabnij.

Today, Nakornloung Boxing Promotion is a family-run operation. His eldest son, Chokchai "Pop" Pisitwuttinan, who holds a bachelor's degree in sports science from Kasetsart University (KU), serves as the head trainer. His third child, Thainchai "Bank" Pisitwuttinan, works as the assistant manager, mainly responsible for coordinating with international boxing organizations and foreign partners. In 2026, during a period when professional boxing in Thailand was facing a downturn and had lost much of its former popularity, he defied the trend by investing over 20 million baht to build a new world-class boxing venue, Nakornloung Stadium, in Nonthaburi. The stadium was established as a venue for bouts involving boxers under his management.

In addition to his boxing career, Surachart was also a cinema owner. He operated around 20 theatres in Bangkok and surrounding areas, such as NK THX (with three branches and a total of 15 screening rooms, all equipped with the THX sound system), Nakhon Non Rama, and Nakornloung Rama. He was also a partner in Nontanund Entertainment, a film distribution company that imported foreign films, including Hong Kong and Hollywood productions, and was also involved in producing Thai films. During the 1990s, the company was regarded as one of the major competitors of Sahamongkol Film. In the mid-1990s, during the early days of his career as a promoter, the second floor of Nakhon Non Rama was used as a boxing gym for training fighters under his management. One of his boxers, Chaosingthong Chalermsri, also worked there as a film projectionist. All of these cinemas have since closed. His younger brother, Supote Pisitwuttinan, served two terms as president of the Federation of National Film Associations of Thailand, which is now known as the National Federation of Motion Pictures and Contents Associations (MPC).
