= Nehomar Cermeño =

Venezuelan boxer (born 1979)

Personal information
- Born: Nehomar Andrés Cermeño; June 7, 1979 (age 47) Barcelona, Anzoátegui, Venezuela
- Height: 5 ft 6 in (168 cm)
- Weight: Bantamweight; Super bantamweight; Featherweight

Boxing career
- Reach: 69.5 in (177 cm)
- Stance: Orthodox

Boxing record
- Total fights: 37
- Wins: 27
- Win by KO: 16
- Losses: 8
- Draws: 1
- No contests: 1
Medal record
Men's amateur boxing
Representing Venezuela
Central American and Caribbean Games
Bronze medal – third place	1998 Maracaibo	Bantamweight
Bronze medal – third place	2002 San Salvador	Featherweight
Pan American Games
Silver medal – second place	1999 Winnipeg	Bantamweight
South American Games
Gold medal – first place	2002 Belém	Featherweight

Nehomar Andrés Cermeño Febres (born June 7, 1979) is a Venezuelan professional boxer who held the WBA (Regular) super bantamweight title from 2016 to 2017. He also held the WBA interim titles at bantamweight and super bantamweight between 2009 and 2014. As an amateur, Cermeño represented Venezuela at the 2000 Olympics as a bantamweight, reaching the Round of 16, where he lost to Agasi Agaguloglu.

== Olympic results ==
- Defeated Riaz Durgahed (Mauritius) 16-4
- Lost to Agasi Agaguloglu (Turkey) 3-11

== Professional career ==
=== Cermeno vs. Mijares ===
Cermeño turned professional on November 13, 2004. In 2009, he scored a major upset by defeating Cristian Mijares to win the WBA bantamweight interim title. He later beat Mijares in a rematch. In 2010 Cermeno lost both of his two bids to defeat world champion Anselmo Moreno.

=== Cermeno vs. Escandon ===
In 2013, Cermeño defeated Óscar Escandón by split decision to win the WBA super bantamweight interim title.

=== Cermeno vs. Xiaojun ===
After being stripped of the title due to inactivity, Cermeño returned in 2015 and won his first full world title by defeating Qiu Xiaojun to win the super bantamweight WBA regular title.

=== Cermeno vs. Kubo ===
Shun Kubo beat Nehomar Cermeno via technical knockout in the 11th round on 9 April 2017.

=== Cermeno vs. Xu ===
Cermeno fought Can Xu on 3 October 2017. Can Xu was ranked #2 by the WBA at featherweight. Xu beat Cermeno by technical knockout in the 7th round.

== Professional boxing record ==
36 fights	26 wins	8 losses
By knockout	15	3
By decision	11	5
Draws	1	
No contests	1	

No.	Result	Record	Opponent	Type	Round, time	Date	Location	Notes
36	Loss	26–8–1 (1)	(United States) Duarn Vue	UD	12	28 Apr 2018	(United States) Menominee Nation Arena, Oshkosh, Wisconsin, U.S.	For vacant WBA Inter-Continental featherweight title
35	Loss	26–7–1 (1)	(China) Can Xu	RTD	7 (12), 3:00	3 Oct 2017	University Gym, Datong, China	For vacant WBA International featherweight title
34	Loss	26–6–1 (1)	(Japan) Shun Kubo	RTD	10 (12), 0:05	9 Apr 2017	Edion Arena, Osaka, Japan	Lost WBA (Regular) super bantamweight title
33	Win	26–5–1 (1)	(China) Qiu Xiaojun	UD	12	17 Dec 2016	ZheJiang University Stadium, Hangzhou, China	Retained WBA (Regular) super bantamweight title
32	Win	25–5–1 (1)	(Thailand) Anurak Thisa	KO	3 (12), 2:19	30 Sep 2016	Wenzhou Gymnasium, Wenzhou, China	Retained WBA (Regular) super bantamweight title
31	Win	24–5–1 (1)	(China) Qiu Xiaojun	TKO	12 (12), 1:11	24 Jun 2016	Capital Gym, Beijing, China	Won vacant WBA (Regular) super bantamweight title
30	Win	23–5–1 (1)	(Nicaragua) Lester Medrano	UD	9	15 Jan 2016	Centro de Convenciones El Cifco, San Salvador, El Salvador	Won vacant WBA Fedebol featherweight title
29	NC	22–5–1 (1)	(Panama) Fredy Pengally	NC	2 (6), 2:26	29 Oct 2015	Hotel RIU, Panama City, Panama	NC after Pengally was cut from an accidental head clash
28	Win	22–5–1	(Colombia) Óscar Escandón	SD	12	10 Aug 2013	Megapolis Convention Center, Panama City, Panama	Won WBA interim super bantamweight title
27	Win	21–5–1	(Mexico) Eduardo Garcia	KO	2 (10), 2:44	5 Apr 2013	Club Nautico Caribe, Colon City, Panama	Won vacant WBA Fedelatin super bantamweight title
26	Loss	20–5–1	(Russia) Alexander Bakhtin	UD	12	4 Apr 2012	Crocus City Hall, Moscow, Russia	For vacant WBA International super bantamweight title
25	Draw	20–4–1	(Cuba) Yoandris Salinas	SD	8	22 Oct 2011	Roberto Durán Arena, Panama City, Panama	For vacant WBA–NABA USA super bantamweight title
24	Loss	20–4	(Mexico) Fernando Montiel	RTD	3 (12), 0:10	25 Jun 2011	Estadio Banorte, Culiacán, Mexico	
23	Loss	20–3	(Mexico) Victor Terrazas	SD	12	29 Jan 2011	Arena Coliseo, Guadalajara, Mexico	
22	Win	20–2	(Colombia) Hugo Berrio	TKO	1 (6), 1:23	30 Nov 2010	Centro de Convenciones Atlapa, Panama City, Panama	
21	Loss	19–2	(Panama) Anselmo Moreno	SD	12	14 Aug 2010	Roberto Durán Arena, Panama City, Panama	For WBA bantamweight title
20	Loss	19–1	(Panama) Anselmo Moreno	SD	12	27 Mar 2010	Polideportivo José María Vargas, La Guaira, Venezuela	For WBA bantamweight title
19	Win	19–0	(Mexico) Alejandro Valdez	KO	11 (12), 2:40	19 Dec 2009	Arena Itson, Ciudad Obregón, Mexico	Retained WBA interim bantamweight title
18	Win	18–0	(Mexico) Cristian Mijares	UD	12	12 Sep 2009	Monterrey Arena, Monterrey, Mexico	Retained WBA interim bantamweight title
17	Win	17–0	(Mexico) Cristian Mijares	SD	12	14 Mar 2009	Auditorio Centenario, Torreón, Mexico	Won vacant WBA interim bantamweight title
16	Win	16–0	(Estonia) Sergei Tasimov	TKO	3 (8), 2:59	11 Jul 2008	Rundturnhalle, Cuxhaven, Germany	
15	Win	15–0	(Mexico) Marco Antonio Hernandez	UD	10	3 May 2008	Hanns-Martin-Schleyer-Halle, Stuttgart, Germany	
14	Win	14–0	(Mexico) Marino Montiel	TKO	2 (10), 1:40	24 Nov 2007	Freiberger Arena, Dresden, Germany	Retained WBA Fedelatin bantamweight title
13	Win	13–0	(Nicaragua) Abraham Irias	TKO	3 (10), 2:40	29 Sep 2007	Jardin Los Mellos, Alanje, Panama	Won vacant WBC FECARBOX bantamweight title
12	Win	12–0	(Russia) Andrey Kostin	MD	8	7 Apr 2007	Universum Gym, Wandsbek, Germany	
11	Win	11–0	(Russia) Ravil Mukhamadiyarov	UD	6	27 Jan 2007	Burg-Waechter Castello, Düsseldorf, Germany	
10	Win	10–0	(Argentina) Leonardo Vicente Fernandez	UD	10	12 May 2006	Super Domo Orfeo, Córdoba, Argentina	Won vacant WBA Fedelatin bantamweight title
9	Win	9–0	(Panama) Leopoldo Arrocha	TKO	7 (10), 2:16	21 Mar 2006	Centro de Convenciones Atlapa, Panama City, Panama	Won vacant WBA Fedecaribe bantamweight title
8	Win	8–0	(Nicaragua) Carlos Guevara	TKO	6 (10)	4 Feb 2006	Centro de Convenciones Figali, Panama City, Panama	
7	Win	7–0	(Colombia) Dioberto Julio	TKO	8 (10), 1:44	10 Dec 2005	Centro de Convenciones Figali, Panama City, Panama	
6	Win	6–0	(Colombia) Miguel Dionisio Cogollo Valdez	KO	1 (8), 2:59	15 Oct 2005	Centro de Convenciones Figali, Panama City, Panama	
5	Win	5–0	(Panama) Ramiro Lara	TKO	3 (6), 1:39	1 Jul 2005	Gimnasio Roberto Durán, Panama City, Panama	
4	Win	4–0	(Panama) Irving Berry	UD	6	16 Apr 2005	Gimnasio Roberto Durán, Panama City, Panama	
3	Win	3–0	(Panama) Alexander Alonso	UD	4	28 Jan 2005	Jardin El Suspiro, San Miguelito, Panama	
2	Win	2–0	(Panama) Moises Rodriguez	TKO	1 (4), 2:15	7 Dec 2004	Pista frente al Joron Bugabeno, Bugaba, Panama	
1	Win	1–0	(Panama) Carlos Loaiza	KO	4 (4), 1:46	13 Nov 2004	Jardín Nuevas Glorias Soberanas, Juan Díaz, Panama	

Sporting positions
Regional boxing titles
New title	WBA Fedecaribe bantamweight champion 21 March 2006 – April 2006; Vacated	Vacant Title next held by Adonis Rivas
Vacant Title last held by Ricardo Cordoba	WBA Fedelatin bantamweight champion 12 May 2006 – 14 March 2009; Won interim title	Vacant Title next held by Liborio Solís
Vacant Title last held by Genaro García	WBC FECARBOX bantamweight champion 29 September 2007 – January 2008; Vacated	Vacant Title next held by Felipe Orucuta
Vacant Title last held by Roberto Vásquez	WBA Fedelatin super bantamweight champion 5 April 2013 – 10 August 2013; Won interim title	Vacant Title next held by Rafael Vazquez
Vacant Title last held by Claudio Fernando Echegaray	WBA Fedebol featherweight champion 15 January 2016 – 24 June 2016; Won world title	Vacant
World boxing titles
Vacant Title last held by Poonsawat Kratingdaenggym	WBA bantamweight champion Interim title March 14, 2009 – March 27, 2010; Lost bid for full title	Vacant Title next held by Hugo Ruiz
Preceded by Scott Quigg as co-titlist until September 5, 2013	WBA super bantamweight champion Interim title August 10, 2013 – September 12, 2014; Stripped	Vacant Title next held by Óscar Escandón
Vacant Title last held by Scott Quigg	WBA super-bantamweight champion Regular title June 24, 2016 – April 9, 2017	Succeeded by Shun Kubo
