= Qiu Xiaojun =

Chinese boxer

Personal information
- Nickname: The Dragon
- Nationality: Chinese
- Born: June 30, 1990 (age 36) Hangzhou, China
- Height: 5 ft 6 in (168 cm)
- Weight: Super Bantamweight

Boxing career
- Stance: Orthodox

Boxing record
- Total fights: 25
- Wins: 21
- Win by KO: 10
- Losses: 4
- Draws: 0
- No contests: 0

Qiu Xiaojun (裘晓君) (born June 30, 1990 in Hangzhou, China) is a Chinese professional boxer and the current WBC Silver Super Bantamweight Champion.

== Professional career ==
Qiu made his professional debut in 2010, losing two of his first nine fights to fellow contender Johnathon Baat.

Qiu claimed his first professional title, the vacant WBC Asian Boxing Council Continental super bantamweight title against Jilo Merlin in his twelfth fight. He followed this up with a victory over Lizandro De los Santos to claim the interim WBC Youth World super bantamweight title. He would later avenge his two defeats to Baat in 2014, retaining his regional title after five defenses.

In early 2015 Qiu faced veteran Sylvester Lopez and won the vacant WBC Silver super bantamweight title via 6th round technical knockout, moving him up the World Boxing Council's rankings.

== Professional record ==
21 Wins (10 Knockouts), 4 Defeats (1 Knockout), 0 Draw
Res.	Record	Opponent	Type	Rd., Time	Date	Location	Notes
Loss	21-4-0	(Venezuela) Nehomar Cermeño	UD	12	2016-12-17	Zhejiang University Stadium, Hangzhou, China	For WBA (Regular) super bantamweight title.
Win	21-3-0	(Philippines) Robert Udtohan	TKO	12	2016-09-30	Wenzhou Gymnasium, Wenzhou, China	
Loss	20-3-0	(Venezuela) Nehomar Cermeño	TKO	12 (12), 1:11	2016-06-24	Capital Indoor Stadium, Beijing, China	For vacant WBA (Regular) super bantamweight title.
Win	20-2-0	(Ghana) Raymond Commey	UD	12	2016-02-12	Luzhou Olympic Sports Park Gymnasium, Luzhou, China	Retained WBA International super bantamweight title.
Win	19-2-0	(France) Amor Belahdj Ali	TKO	11 (12)	2015-11-07	Salle des Étoiles, Monte Carlo, Monaco	Retained WBC Silver super bantamweight title. Won vacant WBA International super bantamweight title.
Win	18-2-0	(Philippines) Diarh Gabutan	KO	6 (12), 2:11	2015-09-11	Yuhang District Gymnasium, Hangzhou, China	Retained WBC Silver super bantamweight title.
Win	17-2-0	(China) Xu Congliang	UD	10	2015-06-20	Yunnan Expo Garden Hotel, Kunming, China	
Win	16-2-0	(Philippines) Sylvester Lopez	TKO	6 (12), 2:38	2015-02-22	Wenshan Prefecture Ethnic Gymnasium, Wenshan, China	Won vacant WBC Silver super bantamweight title.
Win	15-2-0	(Russia) Ruslan Berchuk	KO	1 (10), 1:57	2014-09-08	Kunming Expo Garden China Hall, Kunming, China	Retained WBC Asian Boxing Council Continental super bantamweight title.
Win	14-2-0	(Indonesia) Rasmanudin	KO	4 (12), 1:38	2014-05-16	Nanyang City Gymnasium, Nanyang, China	Retained WBC Asian Boxing Council Continental super bantamweight title.
Win	13-2-0	(Philippines) Jonathan Baat	UD	12	2014-03-28	Daying County Gymnasium, Daying, China	Retained WBC Asian Boxing Council Continental super bantamweight title.
Win	12-2-0	(Australia) Jason Cooper	UD	10	2014-02-05	Haikou Gymnasium, Haikou, China	Retained interim WBC Youth World and WBC Asian Boxing Council Continental super bantamweight titles.
Win	11-2-0	(Mexico) Lizandro De los Santos	KO	2 (10), 1:48	2013-11-16	Yuhang District Gymnasium, Hangzhou, China	Retained WBC Asian Boxing Council Continental super bantamweight title. Won interim WBC Youth World super bantamweight title.
Win	10-2-0	(Philippines) Jilo Merlin	UD	12	2013-08-09	Hengyang City Gymnasium, Hengyang, China	Won vacant WBC Asian Boxing Council Continental super bantamweight title.
Win	9-2-0	(Philippines) Jonel Alibio	UD	6	2013-06-08	Yunnan Expo Garden Hotel, Kunming, China	
Loss	8-2-0	(Philippines) Jonathan Baat	TD	9 (10), 0:53	2013-05-26	Ishikawa Sangyo Hall, Kanazawa, Japan	
Win	8-1-0	(Thailand) Saichol Sithtichai	TKO	2 (4)	2013-02-15	Wat Promthamnimit, Chom Bueng, Thailand	
Win	7-1-0	(Australia) Hwi-jong Kim	TKO	3 (4), 1:03	2012-11-09	Marina Bay Sands Hotel, Singapore	
Loss	6-1-0	(Philippines) Jonathan Baat	UD	8	2012-09-23	Ishikawa Sangyo Hall, Kanazawa, Japan	
Win	6-0-0	(Thailand) Pharkin Phakdeepin	TKO	3 (6), 1:30	2012-06-16	Kunming Gymnasium, Kunming, China	
Win	5-0-0	(Indonesia) Bayu Gede Prabow	UD	4	2012-05-05	Marina Bay Sands Hotel, Singapore	
Win	4-0-0	(Indonesia) Skak Max	UD	6	2011-10-02	Tianjin People's Gymnasium, Tianjin, China	
Win	3-0-0	(China) Adeli Asa	UD	6	2011-09-08	Yunhe Middle School Gymnasium, Pizhou, China	
Win	2-0-0	(Philippines) Ericson Origenes	UD	10	2010-12-05	Gegu Gymnasium, Tianjin, China	
Win	1-0-0	(South Korea) Lee Nam-joon	UD	8	2010-06-30	Pizhou, China	Professional debut.

== Television viewership ==
=== China ===
Date	Fight	Network	Viewership (est.)	Source(s)
12 February 2016	Qiu Xiaojun vs. Raymond Commey	CCTV-5	200,000,000	
	Total viewership		200,000,000	

== See also ==
- WBC Silver Champions

Vacant Title last held by Sylvester Lopez	WBC Asian Boxing Council Continental Super Bantamweight Champion; August 9, 2013 – March 29, 2015; Vacated	Vacant
Vacant Title last held by Horacio Garcia	WBC Youth World Super Bantamweight Champion; Interim Title; November 16, 2013 – April 13, 2014; Vacated	Vacant Title next held by Ye-Joon Kim
Vacant Title last held by Andres Gutierrez	WBC Silver Super Bantamweight Champion; February 22, 2015 – current	Incumbent
Vacant Title last held by Paulus Ambunda	WBA International Super Bantamweight Champion; November 7, 2015 – current	Incumbent
