= Manuel Ávila =

American boxer

Personal information
- Nickname: Tino
- Nationality: American and Mexican
- Born: July 4, 1992 (age 34) Vallejo, California
- Height: 5 ft 7 in (172 cm)
- Weight: Super featherweight Featherweight

Boxing career
- Reach: 70 in (180 cm)
- Stance: Orthodox

Boxing record
- Total fights: 26
- Wins: 23
- Win by KO: 8
- Losses: 2
- Draws: 1
- No contests: 0

Manuel Ávila (born July 4, 1992) is an American professional boxer. He is the IBA Americas Featherweight Champion & NABF Superbantamweight Champion.

== Professional career ==
He is signed by Golden Boy Promotions. On November 18, 2010, Ávila beat the veteran Alexis Hernández at the Club Nokia in Los Angeles, California.

== Professional boxing record ==
30 fights	26 wins	3 losses
By knockout	9	2
By decision	17	1
Draws	1	

No.	Result	Record	Opponent	Type	Round, time	Date	Location	Notes
30	Loss	26–3–1	Charly Suarez	TKO	1 (10), 2:31	Jul 18, 2026	Orange Show Events Center, San Bernardino, California, U.S.	For vacant WBO International super featherweight title
29	Win	26–2–1	Rubén García Hernández	SD	10	May 1, 2026	Tijuana, Baja California, Mexico	
28	Win	25–2–1	Alberto Torres	RTD	6 (8), 3:00	Apr 7, 2023	Cache Creek Casino Resort, Brooks, California, U.S.	
27	Win	24–2–1	Rubén Tostado	UD	8	Feb 17, 2023	Grand Hotel, Tijuana, Baja California, Mexico	
26	Loss	23–2–1	Joet Gonzalez	KO	6 (10), 2:27	Jul 13, 2019	Dignity Health Sports Park, Carson, California, U.S.	For inaugural WBO Global featherweight title
25	Draw	23–1–1	José Santos González	SD	8	Mar 21, 2019	The Avalon, Los Angeles, California, U.S.	
24	Win	23–1	Diuhl Olguín	UD	8	Nov 30, 2017	MGM National Harbor, Oxon Hill, Maryland, U.S.	
23	Loss	22–1	Joseph Diaz	UD	10	May 6, 2017	T-Mobile Arena, Paradise, Nevada, U.S.	For WBC-NABF and vacant WBO-NABO featherweight titles
22	Win	22–0	José Luis Ramírez	SD	10	Nov 4, 2016	Belasco Theater, Los Angeles, California, U.S.	
21	Win	21–0	Prosper Ankrah	UD	10	Jul 9, 2016	Cache Creek Casino Resort, Brooks, California, U.S.	Won vacant IBA featherweight title
20	Win	20–0	René Alvarado	UD	10	Apr 1, 2016	Belasco Theater, Los Angeles, California, U.S.	
19	Win	19–0	José Ángel Beranza	UD	8	Oct 24, 2015	Cache Creek Casino Resort, Brooks, California, U.S.	
18	Win	18–0	Yoandris Salinas	RTD	6 (10), 3:00	Aug 8, 2015	Fantasy Springs Casino, Indio, California, U.S.	Won vacant WBC-NABF super bantamweight title
17	Win	17–0	Erik Ruiz	UD	10	May 7, 2015	Belasco Theater, Los Angeles, California, U.S.	
16	Win	16–0	Sergio Frías	KO	8 (10), 2:27	Aug 22, 2014	Sports Center, Fairfield, California, U.S.	
15	Win	15–0	David de la Mora	KO	2 (10), 1:52	May 15, 2014	Del Mar Fairgrounds, Del Mar, California, U.S.	
14	Win	14–0	Enrique Quevedo	UD	10	Feb 17, 2014	Salinas Storm House, Salinas, California, U.S.	
13	Win	13–0	José Ángel Cota	TKO	2 (10), 2:23	Oct 28, 2013	Sports House, Redwood City, California, U.S.	
12	Win	12–0	Jamal Parram	UD	8	Jun 8, 2013	Home Depot Center, Carson, California, U.S.	
11	Win	11–0	Ricky Lopez	TKO	8 (8), 1:09	Dec 1, 2012	Georgia Duke Center, Vacaville, California, U.S.	
10	Win	10–0	Jhon Alberto Molina	UD	8	Sep 22, 2012	Woodland Community Senior Center, Woodland, California, U.S.	
9	Win	9–0	Vicente Alfaro Martinez	TKO	3 (6), 2:04	Aug 25, 2012	Sports Center, Fairfield, California, U.S.	
8	Win	8–0	Raymond Chacon	UD	4	Jul 28, 2012	HP Pavilion, San Jose, California, U.S.	
7	Win	7–0	David Reyes	UD	6	Mar 3, 2012	Woodland Community Senior Center, Woodland, California, U.S.	
6	Win	6–0	David Reyes	SD	4	Oct 15, 2011	Staples Center, Los Angeles, California, U.S.	
5	Win	5–0	Salvador Sibaja Cifuentes	UD	4	Jun 24, 2011	Sports Centers, Fairfield, California, U.S.	
4	Win	4–0	Jesse Padilla	UD	4	May 20, 2011	Orange County Fairgrounds, Costa Mesa, California, U.S.	
3	Win	3–0	Frank Gutierrez	TKO	2 (4), 0:59	25 Mar 2011	Sports Center, Fairfield, California, U.S.	
2	Win	2–0	Jose Garcia	TKO	4 (4), 2:28	Feb 11, 2011	Sports Center, Fairfield, California, U.S.	
1	Win	1–0	Alexis Hernández	UD	4	Nov 18, 2010	Club Nokia, Los Angeles, California, U.S.	
