= Shun Kubo =

Japanese boxer (born 1990)

Personal information
- Nationality: Japanese
- Born: April 8, 1990 (age 36) Kyoto, Japan
- Height: 5 ft 9 1/2 in (177 cm)
- Weight: Super-bantamweight

Boxing career
- Reach: 71 in (180 cm)
- Stance: Southpaw

Boxing record
- Total fights: 18
- Wins: 15
- Win by KO: 10
- Losses: 3

Shun Kubo (born April 8, 1990) is a Japanese professional boxer who held the WBA (Regular) super-bantamweight title in 2017.

== Professional career ==
Kubo won his first twelve bouts and the WBA (Regular) super-bantamweight title on April 8, 2017, by defeating Nehomar Cermeño, who retired after the tenth round despite knocking Kubo down in the seventh. Kubo lost the title to Daniel Roman in his first defense.

== Professional boxing record ==
18 fights	15 wins	3 losses
By knockout	10	3
By decision	5	0

No.	Result	Record	Opponent	Type	Round, time	Date	Location	Notes
18	Loss	15–3	Ryo Sagawa	KO	3 (8), 1:03	Apr 12, 2022	Korakuen Hall, Tokyo, Japan	
17	Win	15–2	Ruito Saeki	TKO	3 (8), 2:59	Mar 28, 2021	Central Gymnasium, Kobe, Japan	
16	Win	14–2	Takashi Igarashi	UD	8	Sep 26, 2020	Central Gymnasium, Kobe, Japan	
15	Loss	13–2	Xu Can	TKO	6 (12), 1:16	May 26, 2019	Sports Center Gymnasium, Fuzhou, China	For WBA (Regular) featherweight title
14	Win	13–1	Hiroshige Osawa	SD	12	Apr 28, 2018	Central Gymnasium, Kobe, Japan	
13	Loss	12–1	Daniel Roman	TKO	9 (12), 1:21	Sep 3, 2017	Shimazu Arena, Kyoto, Japan	Lost WBA (Regular) super-bantamweight title
12	Win	12–0	Nehomar Cermeño	RTD	10 (12), 0:05	Apr 9, 2017	Edion Arena, Osaka, Japan	Won WBA (Regular) super-bantamweight title
11	Win	11–0	Jin Wook Lim	TKO	4 (12), 2:56	Nov 11, 2016	Central Gymnasium, Kobe, Japan	Retained OPBF super-bantamweight title
10	Win	10–0	Benjie Suganob	UD	12	May 16, 2016	Central Gymnasium, Kobe, Japan	Retained OPBF super-bantamweight title
9	Win	9–0	Lloyd Jardeliza	KO	5 (12), 1:19	Dec 26, 2015	Central Gymnasium, Kobe, Japan	Won vacant OPBF super-bantamweight title
8	Win	8–0	Sarawut Sujarit	KO	1 (8), 0:54	Aug 28, 2015	Central Gymnasium, Kobe, Japan	
7	Win	7–0	Masajiro Honda	TKO	7 (8), 1:01	May 9, 2015	Central Gymnasium, Kobe, Japan	
6	Win	6–0	Luis May	UD	8	Dec 19, 2014	Central Gymnasium, Kobe, Japan	
5	Win	5–0	Renren Pasignahin	TKO	4 (8), 2:37	Aug 22, 2014	Central Gymnasium, Kobe, Japan	
4	Win	4–0	Nongdear Sor Bangkharu	KO	4 (8), 2:18	Apr 4, 2014	Central Gymnasium, Kobe, Japan	
3	Win	3–0	Monico Laurente	UD	8	Nov 29, 2013	Central Gymnasium, Kobe, Japan	
2	Win	2–0	Naranivat Jullabut	TKO	1 (6), 3:00	Sep 1, 2013	Archaic Hall, Amagasaki, Japan	
1	Win	1–0	Yodson Kamnoi	TKO	2 (6), 0:55	May 17, 2013	Central Gymnasium, Kobe, Japan	

Sporting positions
Regional boxing titles
Vacant Title last held by Shingo Wake	OPBF super-bantamweight champion December 26, 2015 – February 2017; Vacated	Vacant Title next held by Hidenori Otake
World boxing titles
Preceded by Nehomar Cermeño	WBA super-bantamweight champion Regular title April 8, 2017 – September 3, 2017	Succeeded by Daniel Roman
