= Suriyan Sor Rungvisai =

Thai boxer

Suriyan Sor Rungvisai สุริยัน ศ.รุ่งวิสัย
Personal information
- Nicknames: Chao nu atchariya (เจ้าหนูอัจฉริยะ) "The Smart Kid"; Sun Wukong (หงอคง)
- Nationality: Thai
- Born: Suriyan Kaiganha (สุริยัน ไขกัญหา); March 2, 1989 (age 37) Sikhio District, Nakhon Ratchasima Province, Thailand
- Height: 161 cm (5 ft 3 in)
- Weight: Flyweight; Super flyweight Bantamweight

Boxing career
- Stance: Orthodox

Boxing record
- Total fights: 57
- Wins: 49
- Win by KO: 25
- Losses: 7
- Draws: 1

Suriyan Sor Rungvisai (born Suriyan Kaiganha, March 2, 1989) is a Thai professional boxer in the super flyweight division. He is the former WBC super flyweight champion. and the older brother of flyweight contender Nawaphon Sor Rungvisai.

== Early life and career ==
Suriyan started his career in Muay Thai at the age of seven. He made his professional boxing debut at the age of 16, beating Yoddoi Sithsoei by decision. Early in his career, he fought for several regional titles, winning the WBO Asia Pacific Youth Light Flyweight Title, and the WBC Asian Boxing Council Flyweight Title, twice. Notable fights, during this time, include a points decision victory against future WBA super flyweight champion Tepparith Singwancha.

He is part of Nakhornluang Boxing Promotion (NKL) under Suchart Pisitwuttinan, the manager of two former WBC world champions (Veeraphol "Death Mask" Sahaprom and Sirimongkol Singwangcha).

On October 18, 2010, he got his first world title shot against the Thai WBC, lineal, and The Ring flyweight world champion Pongsaklek Wonjongkam. The fight was competitive; Rungvisai used his superior speed to trouble the more experienced Wonjongjongkam, winning some of the early and middle rounds, but lost a point in the eight round for an unintentional clash of heads. Wonjongkam was able to close the fight stronger against Rungvisai, winning by a very close unanimous decision. The judges had the fight 115–114, 115–112, 114–113, all for Wonjongkam.

On August 19, 2011, he successfully dethroned Mexican Tomás Rojas with a unanimous decision victory, to capture WBC super flyweight title at Srisaket, Thailand. Despite giving up 5 inches in height to Rojas, Rungvisai is 5'3 and Rojas is 5'8, Rungvisai was able to use his superior speed to land combinations, to win many of the early and middle rounds. Rojas however was able to win the later rounds through increased activity and inside fighting. Rungvisai won by unanimous decision, the judges had the fight 115–114, 116–112 and 117–111, all for Suriyan Sor Rungvisai, becoming the 43rd Thai fighter to gain a major world boxing title.

Rungvisai won his first title defense against, former two-time WBA super flyweight champion Nobuo Nashiro of Japan, winning a unanimous decision, with scores of 115–113, 119–109, and 116–113.

On March 27, 2012, he lost his title to Yota "Magic Box" Sato in Tokyo, Japan.

On October 22, 2014, he lost to Shinsuke Yamanaka for WBC bantamweight class at Yoyogi National Gymnasium, Tokyo, Japan, losing with a unanimous decision, with scores of 114–110, 116–108, and 115–109.

On April 30, 2016, he lost to Anselmo "Chemito" Moreno for silver belt champion at WBC bantamweight class in Panama City.

== Professional boxing record ==
61 fights	52 wins	8 losses
By knockout	28	0
By decision	24	8
Draws	1	

No.	Result	Record	Opponent	Type	Round(s), time	Date	Age	Location	Notes
61	Loss	52–8–1	Kyonosuke Kameda	UD	8	Oct 24, 2024	35 years, 236 days	KBS Hall, Kyoto, Japan	
60	Win	52–7–1	Chaiwat Sangtong	TKO	2 (6), 2:04	Jul 28, 2024	35 years, 148 days	Singmanassak Muaythai School, Pathum Thani, Thailand	
59	Win	51–7–1	Chaitawat Thobbut	TKO	2 (6), 2:49	Apr 11, 2024	35 years, 40 days	Singmanassak Muaythai School, Pathum Thani, Thailand	
58	Win	50–7–1	Jiraphat Chomphuwiset	TKO	4 (6), 2:05	Mar 17, 2024	35 years, 15 days	Singmanassak Muaythai School, Pathum Thani, Thailand	
57	Win	49–7–1	Tommy Seran	KO	3 (6)	Mar 4, 2017	28 years, 2 days	National Stadium Gymnasium, Bangkok, Thailand	
56	Win	48–7–1	John Rey Lauza	UD	12	Dec 15, 2016	27 years, 288 days	Nonthaburi, Thailand	Retained WBC-ABCO bantamweight title
55	Win	47–7–1	Macrea Gandionco	RTD	5 (12), 3:00	Aug 31, 2016	27 years, 182 days	Pathum Thani, Thailand	Retained WBC-ABCO bantamweight title
54	Loss	46–7–1	Anselmo Moreno	UD	12	Apr 30, 2016	27 years, 59 days	Arena Roberto Duran, Panama City, Panama	For vacant WBC Silver bantamweight title
53	Win	46–6–1	Ricky Manufoe	UD	6	Feb 18, 2016	26 years, 353 days	Ratchaprachasamasai School, Phra Pradaeng, Thailand	
52	Win	45–6–1	Frans Damur Palue	KO	2 (12)	Sep 18, 2015	26 years, 200 days	Lad Sawai Market, Pathum Thani, Thailand	Retained WBC-ABCO bantamweight title
51	Win	44–6–1	Ibuki Tanaka	KO	4 (6)	Jul 17, 2015	26 years, 137 days	Iyara Market, Klongluang, Pathum Thani, Thailand	
50	Win	43–6–1	Jomar Fajardo	TKO	2 (12)	Jun 10, 2015	26 years, 100 days	Dino Water Park, Khon Kaen, Thailand	Retained WBC-ABCO bantamweight title
49	Win	42–6–1	Khunsuk Chaiyonggym	KO	2 (6)	May 28, 2015	26 years, 87 days	Liptapanlop Hall, Nakhon Ratchasima, Thailand	
48	Win	41–6–1	Manot Comput	KO	4 (6)	Apr 28, 2015	26 years, 57 days	Prasamut Jedi, Samut Prakan, Thailand	
47	Win	40–6–1	Samuel Tehuayo	UD	6	Feb 24, 2015	25 years, 359 days	Klong 6, Khlong Luang, Thailand	
46	Win	39–6–1	Daoden Sithsaithong	KO	3 (6)	Jan 23, 2015	25 years, 327 days	NCO Club, Royal Thai Airforce, Bangkok, Thailand	
45	Win	38–6–1	Tony Arema	KO	1 (12), 1:59	Dec 19, 2014	25 years, 292 days	Kinpoo Seafood Restaurant, Samut Prakan, Thailand	
44	Loss	37–6–1	Shinsuke Yamanaka	UD	12	Oct 22, 2014	25 years, 234 days	Yoyogi #2 Gymnasium, Tokyo, Japan	For WBC bantamweight title
43	Win	37–5–1	Falazona Fidal	PTS	6	Jul 18, 2014	25 years, 138 days	Lad Sawai Market, Pathum Thani, Thailand	
42	Win	36–5–1	Fernando Ocon	RTD	7 (12), 3:00	May 16, 2014	25 years, 75 days	Pak Kret Pier, Pak Kret, Thailand	
41	Win	35–5–1	Samuel Tehuayo	UD	6	Apr 8, 2014	25 years, 37 days	Lamsamkaew Youth Center, Pathum Thani, Thailand	
40	Win	34–5–1	Jimmy Masangkay	KO	2 (12)	Mar 7, 2014	25 years, 5 days	Thai Wasadu store, Sukkapibal 3 Road, Bangkok, Thailand	Retained WBC-ABCO bantamweight title
39	Win	33–5–1	Piyanut Sintao	KO	1 (6), 1:16	Feb 18, 2014	24 years, 353 days	NCO Club, Royal Thai Airforce, Bangkok, Thailand	
38	Win	32–5–1	Fernando Ocon	UD	12	Jan 21, 2014	24 years, 325 days	Wat Klang Klong 3 School, Pathum Thani, Thailand	Retained WBC-ABCO bantamweight title
37	Win	31–5–1	Singnamchai Chaiyonggym	KO	2 (6)	Nov 15, 2013	24 years, 258 days	Provincial Stadium, Nakhon Ratchasima, Thailand	
36	Win	30–5–1	Jilo Merlin	UD	6	Oct 8, 2013	24 years, 220 days	Samakkeeradbamrung School, Pathum Thani, Thailand	
35	Win	29–5–1	Daryl Basadre	KO	6 (12), 1:18	Sep 6, 2013	24 years, 188 days	NCO Club, Royal Thai Airforce, Bangkok, Thailand	
34	Win	28–5–1	Chandech Sor Ratidech	KO	1 (6), 1:57	Jul 19, 2013	24 years, 139 days	King Ramesuan Provincial Stadium, Lop Buri, Thailand	
33	Win	27–5–1	Renz Llagas	UD	12	Jun 25, 2013	24 years, 115 days	The Mall, Nakhon, Ratchasima, Thailand	Retained WBC-ABCO bantamweight title
32	Win	26–5–1	Jilo Merlin	UD	10	May 3, 2013	24 years, 62 days	Khonmuangsri Stadium, Si Sa Ket, Thailand	
31	Win	25–5–1	Not listed	KO	3 (6)	Mar 18, 2013	24 years, 16 days	NCO Club, Royal Thai Airforce, Bangkok, Thailand	
30	Win	24–5–1	Elmar Francisco	UD	6	Jan 28, 2013	23 years, 332 days	Bangplama School, Suphan Buri, Thailand	
29	Win	23–5–1	Safwan Lombok	KO	4 (6), 0:44	Dec 3, 2012	23 years, 276 days	North Bangkok University, Bangkok, Thailand	
28	Win	22–5–1	Ricky Manufoe	KO	4 (12), 2:37	Oct 2, 2012	23 years, 214 days	Nonthaburi Pier, Nonthaburi, Thailand	Won vacant WBC-ABCO bantamweight title
27	Win	21–5–1	Michael Rodriguez	UD	6	Jul 2, 2012	23 years, 122 days	Minburi Market, Minburi, Thailand	
26	Loss	20–5–1	Yota Sato	UD	12	Mar 27, 2012	23 years, 25 days	Korakuen Hall, Tokyo, Japan	Lost WBC super flyweight title
25	Win	20–4–1	Nobuo Nashiro	UD	12	Nov 4, 2011	22 years, 247 days	National Stadium Gymnasium, Bangkok, Thailand	Retained WBC super flyweight title
24	Win	19–4–1	Tomás Rojas	UD	12	Aug 19, 2011	22 years, 170 days	Khonmuangsri Stadium, Si Sa Ket, Thailand	Won WBC super flyweight title
23	Win	18–4–1	Boido Simanjuntak	TKO	5 (6), 2:26	Jun 14, 2011	22 years, 104 days	Bang Phun, Thailand	
22	Win	17–4–1	Little Roseman	TKO	3 (6)	Apr 12, 2011	22 years, 41 days	Mai Khao Beach, Phuket, Thailand	
21	Win	16–4–1	Javier Malulan	KO	5 (6), 1:10	Mar 3, 2011	22 years, 1 day	Phra Samut Chedi, Thailand	
20	Win	15–4–1	Takashi Kunishige	UD	12	Dec 24, 2010	21 years, 297 days	Rajabhat Srisaket University, Si Sa Ket, Thailand	Won vacant WBC-ABCO flyweight title
19	Loss	14–4–1	Pongsaklek Wonjongkam	UD	12	Oct 8, 2010	21 years, 159 days	Mueang Noi, Thailand	For WBC and The Ring flyweight titles
18	Win	14–3–1	Decky Putra	KO	1 (6), 2:04	Jul 20, 2010	21 years, 140 days	Nongnaree Park, Petchaboon, Thailand	
17	Win	13–3–1	Agus Alor	KO	2 (6)	Feb 25, 2010	20 years, 360 days	Nongnaree Park, Petchaboon, Thailand	
16	Win	12–3–1	Agus Situmorang	KO	3 (12)	Nov 16, 2009	20 years, 259 days	Pamok School, Ang Thong, Thailand	Retained WBC-ABCO flyweight title
15	Win	11–3–1	John Bima	KO	2 (12), 1:38	Jul 17, 2009	20 years, 137 days	Central Market of Ladsawai, Lamlooka, Pathum Thani, Thailand	Retained WBC-ABCO flyweight title
14	Win	10–3–1	Irfan Ogah	UD	12	Feb 26, 2009	19 years, 361 days	Tupathemee Sport Arena, Bangkok, Thailand	Won vacant WBC-ABCO flyweight title
13	Win	9–3–1	Panthep Mullipoom	PTS	6	Dec 12, 2008	19 years, 285 days	Nong Mamong, Thailand	
12	Loss	8–3–1	Jin Man Jeon	UD	12	Oct 11, 2008	19 years, 223 days	Masan, South Korea	For vacant interim WBO Asia Pacific flyweight title
11	Draw	8–2–1	Fernando Lumacad	SD	12	Oct 4, 2008	19 years, 216 days	Naga Sports Complex, Naga City, Cebu, Philippines	For vacant interim WBO Oriental flyweight title
10	Win	8–2	Yodsing Sithteerapong	PTS	6	Aug 22, 2008	19 years, 173 days	Nonthaburi, Thailand	
9	Win	7–2	Rommel Asenjo	UD	6	Feb 22, 2008	18 years, 357 days	Tamaka Witthayakom School, Kanchanaburi, Thailand	
8	Loss	6–2	Taned Jitkawee	PTS	8	Oct 12, 2007	18 years, 224 days	Chumphon, Thailand	
7	Win	6–1	Lowie Bantigue	UD	6	Aug 27, 2007	18 years, 178 days	Pattaya, Thailand	
6	Win	5–1	Heri Amol	UD	10	Jun 4, 2007	18 years, 94 days	Nongtakao School, Rayong, Thailand	Won vacant WBO Asia Pacific Youth super flyweight title
5	Loss	4–1	Javier Malulan	UD	10	Apr 7, 2007	18 years, 36 days	Baguio City Convention Center, Baguio City, Benguet, Philippines	For vacant WBO Asia Pacific Youth flyweight title
4	Win	4–0	Roel Gade	UD	10	Feb 23, 2007	17 years, 358 days	Chokchai 4 Center, Bangkok, Thailand	
3	Win	3–0	Bunnam Thammakhun	UD	6	Dec 22, 2006	17 years, 295 days	Dhurakij Pundit University, Bangkok, Thailand	
2	Win	2–0	Ekkawit Thongmee	PTS	6	Sep 24, 2006	17 years, 206 days	Central Plaza, Rama II, Bangkok, Thailand	
1	Win	1–0	Yoddoi Sithsoei	PTS	6	Jul 31, 2006	17 years, 151 days	Rajadamnern Stadium, Bangkok, Thailand	

== Other names ==
- Suriyan Por Chokchai (สุริยัน ป.โชคชัย)
- Suriyan Nakhornluang Promotion (สุริยัน นครหลวงโปรโมชั่น)
- Saensaknoi Or Muang Klaeng (แสนศักดิ์น้อย อ.เมืองแกลง)

== See also ==
- List of world super-flyweight boxing champions

Sporting positions
World boxing titles
Preceded by Tomás Rojas	WBC Super flyweight champion August 19, 2011 – March 27, 2012	Succeeded by Yota Sato
