= Juan José Montes =

Mexican boxer (born 1989)

Personal information
- Nickname: Goofy
- Born: Juan José Montes Valderrama; July 15, 1989 (age 36) Guadalajara, Jalisco, Mexico
- Height: 5 ft 7 in (170 cm)
- Weight: Super Bantamweight; Bantamweight; Super Flyweight

Boxing career
- Reach: 70 in (180 cm)
- Stance: Orthodox

Boxing record
- Total fights: 34
- Wins: 25
- Win by KO: 15
- Losses: 7
- Draws: 2
- No contests: 0

Juan José Montes Valderrama (born 15 July 1989) is a Mexican professional boxer. He challenged for the WBC super flyweight title in 2011.

== Professional career ==
Montes defeated Francisco Reyes for the second time in over a year to retain the WBC Continental Americas crown via a 12-round unanimous decision. On November 28, 2009, Montes beat contender Fernando Lumacad by a 10-round majority decision to win the WBC Youth World Super Flyweight title.

On 2 October 2010, Montes defeated Filipino Sylvester Lopez in a WBC Super Flyweight title eliminator bout. Montes knocked Lopez to the canvas in the first round. In the third round, Montes suffered a headbutt which caused a cut above his right eye and resulted in Lopez being deducted a point. The referee was ultimately forced to stop the bout in the fifth round due to the severity of the cut and Montes was awarded a unanimous technical decision.

=== WBC super flyweight title ===
In May, Montes will fight Tomás Rojas for the WBC Super Flyweight title.

=== Professional boxing record ===
25 Wins (15 knockouts), 6 Losses 2 Draws
Res.	Record	Opponent	Type	Rd., Time	Date	Location	Notes
Loss	25-6-2	(Mexico) Oscar Duarte	RTD	4 (8)	2016-07-23	(United States) Fantasy Springs Casino, USA	
Win	25-5-2	(Mexico) Jose Servin	PTS	10	2017-10-13	Guadalajara, Jalisco, Mexico	
Win	24-5-2	(Mexico) Francisco Suarez	TKO	2 (8)	2015-12-18	Guadalajara, Jalisco, Mexico	
Loss	23-5-2	(Mexico) Edgar Monarrez	KO	7 (12)	2014-04-05	Gran Estadio, Ciudad Delicias, Chihuahua, Mexico	For WBC International super featherweight title.
Loss	23-4-2	(Mexico) Julio Ceja	TKO	10 (12)	2013-10-12	Hard Rock Hotel, Puerto Vallarta, Jalisco, Mexico	For vacant WBC Silver bantamweight title.
Draw	23-3-2	(Mexico) Julio César Miranda	MD	12	2013-04-13	Monumental Plaza de Toros, Ciudad Hidalgo, Michoacán, Mexico	For vacant WBC Continental Americas bantamweight title.
Loss	23-3-1	(Mexico) Martin Casillas	SD	10	2013-01-12	Foro Polanco, Mexico City, Distrito Federal, Mexico	
Win	23-2-1	(Mexico) Oscar Ibarra	UD	12	2012-09-22	Unidad Deportiva Norte, Cortázar, Guanajuato, Mexico	Won vacant WBF super flyweight title.
Draw	22-2-1	(Mexico) Victor Zaleta	SD	12	2012-06-02	Coliseo Olimpico de la UG, Guadalajara, Jalisco, Mexico	Lost WBF super flyweight title in the Weight In.
Win	22-2	(Mexico) Oscar Ibarra	UD	12	2012-02-25	Coliseo Olimpico de la UG, Guadalajara, Jalisco, Mexico	Won vacant IBF International & WBF Super Flyweight titles.
Win	21-2	(Mexico) Jose Luis Rosales	TKO	2 (10)	2011-10-08	Los Cabos, Baja California Sur, Mexico	
Win	20-2	(Mexico) Sammy Reyes	TKO	2 (10)	2011-08-20	Casino Black Pyramid, Manzanillo, Colima, Mexico	
Loss	19-2	(Mexico) Tomas Rojas	RTD	11 (12)	2011-05-21	Metropolitan Arena, Tuxtla Gutierrez, Chiapas, Mexico	For WBC World Super Flyweight title.
Win	19-1	(Philippines) Silvester Lopez	TD	5 (12)	2010-10-02	Coliseo Olimpico de la UG, Guadalajara, Jalisco, Mexico	WBC Super Flyweight title eliminator.
Win	18-1	(Philippines) Richard Garcia	TKO	4 (10)	2010-06-19	Mesón de los Deportes, Tepic, Nayarit, Mexico	Retained WBC Youth super flyweight title.
Win	17-1	(Mexico) Roberto Carlos Leyva	DQ	3 (10)	2010-04-03	Coliseo Olimpico de la UG, Guadalajara, Jalisco, Mexico	Retained WBC Youth super flyweight title.
Win	16-1	(Philippines) Fernando Lumacad	UD	10	2009-11-28	Coliseo Olimpico de la UG, Guadalajara, Jalisco, Mexico	Retained WBC Youth super flyweight title.
Win	15-1	(Mexico) Jose Salgado	KO	2 (10)	2009-10-03	Coliseo Olimpico de la UG, Guadalajara, Jalisco, Mexico	Won WBC Youth super flyweight title.
