= Tomás Rojas (boxer) =

Mexican world champion boxer (b. 1980)

Personal information
- Nickname: Gusano
- Born: Tomás Rojas Gómez; 12 June 1980 (age 46) Tlalixcoyan, Veracruz, Mexico
- Height: 5 ft 8 in (173 cm)
- Weight: Flyweight; Super flyweight; Bantamweight; Super bantamweight; Featherweight

Boxing career
- Reach: 69 1/2 in (177 cm)
- Stance: Orthodox

Boxing record
- Total fights: 74
- Wins: 52
- Win by KO: 34
- Losses: 20
- Draws: 1
- No contests: 1

Tomás Rojas Gómez (born 12 June 1980) is a Mexican professional boxer who held the WBC super flyweight title from 2010 to 2011.

== Professional career ==
He won the WBC interim super flyweight title on 18 July 2009 against landsman Everardo Morales.

On 20 September 2010 Rojas won the WBC super flyweight title against Kohei Kono in Saitama, Saitama, Japan. On 5 February 2011, Rojas defended his title against former two time WBA super flyweight champion Nobuo Nashiro, winning by unanimous decision. Rojas lost his title to Suriyan Sor Rungvisai in Sisaket, Thailand on 19 August 2011.

== Professional boxing record ==
74 fights	52 wins	20 losses
By knockout	34	5
By decision	16	15
By disqualification	2	0
Draws	1	
No contests	1	

No.	Result	Record	Opponent	Type	Round, time	Date	Location	Notes
74	Loss	52–20–1 (1)	(Morocco) Moussa Gholam	TKO	5 (10)	2022-02-27	(Spain) Cotxeres de Sants, Barcelona	
73	Win	52–19–1 (1)	(Dominican Republic) Ranfis Encarnación	DQ	10 (10)	2020-12-17	(Dominican Republic) Hotel Catalonia Malecon Center, Santo Domingo	
72	Loss	51–19–1 (1)	(Tajikistan) Muhammadkhuja Yaqubov	UD	12 (12)	2020-03-07	(Russia) RCC Boxing Academy, Ekaterinburg	
71	Loss	51–18–1 (1)	(Mexico) Miguel Román	UD	12 (12)	2019-09-07	(Mexico) Gimnasio Municipal "Jose Neri Santos", Ciudad Juarez	
70	Loss	51–17–1 (1)	(Mexico) Andrés Gutiérrez	UD	12 (12)	2019-06-22	(Mexico) San Juan del Rio	
69	Win	51–16–1 (1)	(Mexico) Jairo Lopez	RTD	10 (12)	2019-02-02	(Mexico) Gimnasio de las Liebres, Rio Bravo	
68	Win	50–16–1 (1)	(Mexico) Jhonny González	MD	12	2018-10-06	Arena Coliseo, Mexico City, Distrito Federal, Mexico	Won vacant WBC International Silver super featherweight title
67	Loss	49–16–1 (1)	(Mexico) Edivaldo Ortega	RTD	7 (10), 3:00	2017-10-07	Gimnasio de la AUT, Tampico, Mexico	
66	Win	49–15–1 (1)	(Mexico) Jose Cifuentes	TKO	5 (10), 2:43	2017-06-17	Palenque de Gallos, Comitan, Mexico	
65	Loss	48–15–1 (1)	(Mexico) Cristian Mijares	UD	10	2017-04-08	Oasis Hotel Complex, Cancun, Mexico	
64	Win	48–14–1 (1)	(Colombia) Jose Sanmartin	DQ	6 (10)	2016-08-13	Veracruz, Veracruz, Mexico	
63	Win	47–14–1 (1)	(Ghana) Prosper Ankrah	RTD	4 (10)	2016-04-09	Veracruz, Veracruz, Mexico	
62	Win	46–14–1 (1)	(Philippines) Edward Mansito	TKO	9 (10)	2015-10-17	Veracruz, Veracruz, Mexico	Won vacant WBC Continental Americas featherweight title
61	Win	45–14–1 (1)	(Mexico) Jonathan Lecona Ramos	KO	5 (10)	2015-05-30	Veracruz, Veracruz, Mexico	
60	Win	44–14–1 (1)	(Panama) Irving Berry	UD	10	2014-08-09	Arena Monterrey, Monterrey, Nuevo León, Mexico	
59	Win	43–14–1 (1)	(Mexico) Jose Cabrera	TKO	8 (10)	2014-05-03	Palenque de la Feria Ganadera, Culiacan, Sinaloa, Mexico	
58	Win	42–14–1 (1)	(Philippines) Vergel Nebran	TKO	8 (10)	2014-01-11	Auditorio Benito Juárez, Veracruz, Veracruz, Mexico	
57	Win	41–14–1 (1)	(Mexico) Enrique Bernache	UD	10	2013-09-07	Palenque de la Feria Mesoamericana, Tapachula, Chiapas, Mexico	
56	Win	40–14–1 (1)	(Philippines) Jaderes Padua	KO	6 (10)	2013-04-13	Monumental Plaza de Toros, Ciudad Hidalgo, Michoacán, Mexico	Won vacant WBC Latino bantamweight title
55	Loss	39–14–1 (1)	(Japan) Shinsuke Yamanaka	KO	7 (12)	2012-11-03	Xebio Arena, Sendai, Miyagi, Japan	For WBC bantamweight title
54	Win	39–13–1 (1)	(Mexico) Manuel de los Reyes Herrera	KO	4 (8)	2012-07-14	Palenque de la Feria Ganadera, Culiacan, Sinaloa, Mexico	
53	Win	38–13–1 (1)	(Mexico) Julio Zarate	UD	10	2012-03-03	Auditorio Municipal, Tijuana, Baja California, Mexico	
52	Win	37–13–1 (1)	(Paraguay) Dario Azuaga	TKO	2 (10)	2011-11-05	Auditorio Municipal, Tijuana, Baja California, Mexico	
51	Loss	36–13–1 (1)	(Thailand) Suriyan Sor Rungvisai	UD	12	2011-08-19	Khunmuangsri Stadium, Mueang Noi, Thailand	Lost WBC super flyweight title
50	Win	36–12–1 (1)	(Mexico) Juan José Montes	RTD	11 (12)	2011-05-21	Metropolitan Arena, Tuxtla Gutierrez, Chiapas, Mexico	Retained WBC super flyweight title
49	Win	35–12–1 (1)	(Japan) Nobuo Nashiro	UD	12	2011-02-05	Prefectural Gymnasium, Osaka, Osaka, Japan	Retained WBC super flyweight title
48	Win	34–12–1 (1)	(Japan) Kohei Kono	UD	12	2010-09-20	Saitama Super Arena, Saitama, Saitama, Japan	Won vacant WBC super flyweight title
47	Win	33–12–1 (1)	(Colombia) Felipe Almanza	RTD	6 (10)	2010-06-19	San Juan del Rio, Queretaro, Mexico	Won vacant WBC USNBC super flyweight title
46	Win	32–12–1 (1)	(Mexico) Jorge Cardenas	TKO	4 (10)	2010-05-01	Complejo La Inalambrica, Merida, Yucatán, Mexico	
45	Loss	31–12–1 (1)	(Armenia) Vic Darchinyan	KO	2 (12)	2009-12-12	(United States) Agua Caliente Casino, Rancho Mirage, California, U.S.	For WBC & WBA (Super) super flyweight title
44	Win	31–11–1 (1)	(South Africa) Evans Mbamba	UD	12	2009-10-24	World Trade Center, Boca del Rio, Veracruz, Mexico	Retained interim WBC super flyweight title
43	Win	30–11–1 (1)	(Mexico) Everardo Morales	RTD	9 (12)	2009-07-18	Centro de Convenciones, Puerto Vallarta, Jalisco, Mexico	Won interim WBC super flyweight title
42	Win	29–11–1 (1)	(Mexico) Javier Romano	KO	6 (10)	2009-03-28	Boca del Rio, Veracruz, Mexico	
41	Win	28–11–1 (1)	(Nicaragua) Carlos Rueda	RTD	9 (12)	2009-01-17	Auditorio Nuevo Serdan Erchavaleta, Veracruz, Veracruz, Mexico	Won vacant WBC International super flyweight title
40	Draw	27–11–1 (1)	(Mexico) Cesar Ricardo Martinez	TD	2 (8)	2008-12-06	Palenque Calle 2, Zapopan, Jalisco, Mexico	
39	Win	27–11 (1)	(Mexico) Charly Valenzuela	KO	3 (6)	2008-07-19	Explanada Tecate, Navojoa, Sonora, Mexico	
38	Win	26–11 (1)	(Mexico) Marco Antonio Hernandez	UD	10	2007-11-24	Estadio Beto Ávila, Veracruz, Veracruz, Mexico	
37	Loss	25–11 (1)	(Mexico) Jorge Arce	TKO	6 (12)	2007-09-16	(United States) Hard Rock Hotel and Casino, Las Vegas, Nevada, U.S.	For WBC Latino bantamweight title
36	Win	25–10 (1)	(Mexico) Jorge Lopez	TKO	5 (6)	2007-08-10	Polideportivo Centenario, Los Mochis, Sinaloa, Mexico	
35	Loss	24–10 (1)	(Panama) Anselmo Moreno	UD	10	2007-06-02	Gimnasio Roberto Duran, Panama City, Panama	For WBA Fedecaribe bantamweight title
34	Win	24–9 (1)	(Mexico) Jorge Romero	TKO	2 (10)	2007-04-22	Hotel Veracruz, Veracruz, Veracruz, Mexico	
33	Win	23–9 (1)	(Mexico) Julio Grimaldo	KO	4 (10)	2007-02-03	Estadio Carlos Serdan, Veracruz, Veracruz, Mexico	
32	Win	22–9 (1)	(Mexico) Ramon Leyte	TKO	7 (10)	2006-10-26	Palacio Videmar, Tlatelolco, Mexico	
31	Loss	21–9 (1)	(Philippines) Gerry Peñalosa	UD	10	2006-07-02	Quezon City, Metro Manila, Philippines	
30	Loss	21–8 (1)	(Puerto Rico) Jose Nieves	UD	10	2006-04-22	(United States) Club Cinema, Pompano Beach, Florida, U.S.	
29	Loss	21–7 (1)	(Mexico) Luis Maldonado	SD	10	2005-10-29	(United States) Dodge Arena, Hidalgo, Texas, U.S.	
28	Win	21–6 (1)	(Nicaragua) Erick Sandoval	TKO	9 (10)	2005-02-26	Universidad de Managua, Managua, Nicaragua	
27	Win	20–6 (1)	(Nicaragua) Moises Castro	TKO	10 (12)	2004-09-17	Casino Pharaohs, Managua, Nicaragua	Won WBA Fedecentro super bantamweight title
26	Loss	19–6 (1)	(Mexico) Cristian Mijares	UD	12	2004-03-12	Palenque Vicente Fernandez, Gomez Palacio, Durango, Mexico	Lost Mexico super flyweight title
25	Win	19–5 (1)	(United States) Jacinto Quintana	UD	4	2003-09-27	(United States) Harborside Event Center, Fort Myers, Florida, U.S.	
24	Win	18–5 (1)	(Mexico) Francisco Paredes	KO	3 (12)	2003-07-25	Mexico City, Distrito Federal, Mexico	Retained Mexico super flyweight title
23	Win	17–5 (1)	(Mexico) Javier Torres	KO	6 (12)	2002-09-14	Arena Mexico, Mexico City, Distrito Federal, Mexico	Retained Mexico super flyweight title
22	NC	16–5 (1)	(Mexico) Alejandro Montiel	NC	2 (12)	2002-05-17	Auditorio Benito Juarez, Los Mochis, Sinaloa, Mexico	For IBA flyweight title
21	Win	16–5	(Mexico) Trinidad Mendoza	TKO	8 (12)	2001-09-01	Guaymas, Sonora, Mexico	Retained Mexico super flyweight title
20	Win	15–5	(Mexico) Javier Torres	UD	12	2001-04-08	Xalapa, Veracruz, Mexico	Won Mexico super flyweight title
19	Win	14–5	(Mexico) Ruben Diaz	UD	10	2000-09-29	Veracruz, Veracruz, Mexico	
18	Loss	13–5	(Nicaragua) Rosendo Álvarez	UD	10	2000-03-11	Gimnasio Polideportivo Espana, Managua, Nicaragua	
17	Win	13–4	(Mexico) Rolando Diaz	KO	11 (12)	1999-11-18	Veracruz, Veracruz, Mexico	Won Veracruz State bantamweight title
16	Loss	12–4	(Mexico) Lauro Lopez	SD	6	1999-07-04	San Pablo del Monte, Tlaxcala, Mexico	
15	Loss	12–3	(Mexico) Jesus Martinez	UD	8	1999-06-05	Arena Coliseo, Mexico City, Distrito Federal, Mexico	
14	Win	12–2	(Mexico) Orlando Rojas	UD	8	1999-04-29	Veracruz, Veracruz, Mexico	
13	Loss	11–2	(Mexico) Cecilio Santos	MD	8	1999-03-20	Arena Mexico, Mexico City, Distrito Federal, Mexico	
12	Win	11–1	(Mexico) Isaac Bustos	TKO	3 (8)	1998-10-24	Arena Mexico, Mexico City, Distrito Federal, Mexico	
11	Win	10–1	(Mexico) Guillermo Fuentes	KO	8 (8)	1998-07-16	Veracruz, Veracruz, Mexico	
10	Win	9–1	(Mexico) Gonzalo Diaz Montalvo	UD	6	1998-05-29	Veracruz, Veracruz, Mexico	
9	Win	8–1	(Mexico) Aldo Amaro	TKO	1 (4)	1998-05-09	Arena Coliseo, Mexico City, Distrito Federal, Mexico	
8	Loss	7–1	(Mexico) Aaron Dominguez	SD	6	1998-02-07	Arena Coliseo, Mexico City, Distrito Federal, Mexico	
7	Win	7–0	(Mexico) Javier Alonso	KO	6 (8)	1997-11-18	Veracruz, Veracruz, Mexico	
6	Win	6–0	(Dominican Republic) Juan Guerrero	KO	6 (6)	1997-09-20	Veracruz, Veracruz, Mexico	
5	Win	5–0	(Mexico) Jorge Santos	KO	3 (6)	1997-08-11	Tijuana, Baja California, Mexico	
4	Win	4–0	(Mexico) Gustavo Morales	KO	5 (6)	1997-07-13	Veracruz, Veracruz, Mexico	
3	Win	3–0	(Mexico) Agustin Hernandez	UD	4	1997-05-02	Veracruz, Veracruz, Mexico	
2	Win	2–0	(Mexico) David Sanchez	UD	4	1997-01-15	Veracruz, Veracruz, Mexico	
1	Win	1–0	(Mexico) Gonzalo Diaz Montalvo	UD	4	1996-12-16	Veracruz, Veracruz, Mexico	

== See also ==
- List of world super-flyweight boxing champions
- List of Mexican boxing world champions

Sporting positions
World boxing titles
Vacant Title last held by Cristian Mijares	WBC Super flyweight champion Interim title 18 July 2009 – 12 December 2009; Lost bid for full title	Vacant
Vacant Title last held by Vic Darchinyan	WBC Super flyweight champion 20 September 2010 – 19 August 2011	Succeeded by Suriyan Sor Rungvisai
