= David de la Mora =

Mexican boxer

David De La Mora
Personal information
- Nickname: Morita
- Born: David De La Mora Zambrano; 3 June 1989 (age 37) Tijuana, Baja California, Mexico
- Height: 1.68 m (5 ft 6 in)
- Weight: Super Bantamweight; Bantamweight

Boxing career
- Reach: 174 cm (69 in)
- Stance: Orthodox

Boxing record
- Total fights: 33
- Wins: 27
- Win by KO: 18
- Losses: 6
- Draws: 0
- No contests: 0

David De La Mora Zambrano (born 3 June 1989) is a Mexican professional boxer who twice challenged for the WBA bantamweight title in 2011 and 2012.

== Early life ==
After qualifying as a dental technician, De La Mora is currently majoring in media studies at the University Center of Tijuana.

== Professional career ==
De La Mora is managed by Antonio Lozada Sr. of Baja Boxing and trains under Romulo Quirarte's guidance.

In April 2010, De La Mora beat veteran Jovanny Soto by T.K.O. to win the WBC FECARBOX Bantamweight Championship. The bout was the main-event of a Televisa boxing card at the Palenque of Morelos Park in Tijuana.

=== WBA Bantamweight Championship ===
De La Mora fought against Kōki Kameda for the WBA Bantamweight Championship in front of 9,500 spectators (announced by the organizer) at the Nippon Budokan in Tokyo on August 31, 2011. He opened a cut above Kameda's left eye with his right cross in the third round, but was knocked down once in the same round. As a result, he lost via a unanimous decision on the judges' scorecards. The three judges' scores were 113–114, 113–115 and 112–115.

This card was staged by Kameda Promotions whose president is Kōki Kameda himself, as the TBS televised co-main event to Hugo Cázares vs. Tomonobu Shimizu. Antonio Lozada Sr. protested the decisions of the judges of those two title bouts, especially Kameda vs. De La Mora, and stated he would send a letter to the WBA.

=== WBA (Super) Bantamweight Championship ===
De La Mora and his team had been eager for a second world title shot against Kameda or other champions, and he earned the opportunity to fight for the WBA Super World Bantamweight Title against Anselmo Moreno in the Showtime-televised co-main event at the Don Haskins Center on April 21, 2012. Lozada Sr. mentioned that De La Mora grew up in all aspects after the Kameda fight and that he would conquer a tricky championship.

=== Mora vs. Isawa ===
On December 27, David De La Mora faced off against Ryosuke Isawa. Isawa won by unanimous decision in the 10th round with all judges scorecards with 100–90. This was a non-title fight. This was De La Mora's first time losing 2 times in a row.

== Professional boxing record ==
33 fights	27 wins	6 losses
By knockout	18	4
By decision	9	2

No.	Result	Record	Opponent	Type	Round, time	Date	Location	Notes
33	Win	27–6	Efrain González	UD	8	16 Jun 2016	Domo Tour, Tijuana, Mexico	
32	Win	26–6	Sergio Nájera	UD	6	15 Apr 2016	Grand Hotel Tijuana, Zona Río, Tijuana, Mexico	
31	Loss	25–6	Manuel Ávila	KO	2 (10), 1:52	15 May 2014	Del Mar Fairgrounds, Del Mar, California, U.S.	
30	Loss	25–5	Francisco Gabriel Piña	TKO	5 (8), 0:43	13 Dec 2013	Casino Hipódromo Agua Caliente, Tijuana, Mexico	
29	Loss	25–4	Jonatan Lecona Ramos	TKO	8 (10), 2:27	28 Jun 2013	Forum Tecate, Tijuana, Mexico	
28	Win	25–3	Claudio Aguilar Loreto	TKO	2 (6), 2:24	11 May 2013	Casino Hipódromo Agua Caliente, Tijuana, Mexico	
27	Loss	24–3	Ryosuke Iwasa	UD	10	27 Oct 2012	Tokyo International Forum, Tokyo, Japan	
26	Loss	24–2	Anselmo Moreno	RTD	8 (12), 3:00	21 Apr 2012	Don Haskins Center, El Paso, Texas, U.S.	For WBA (Super) bantamweight title
25	Win	24–1	Eddy Julio	TKO	7 (10), 0:28	3 Dec 2012	Auditorio Ernesto Rufo, Rosarito, Mexico	
24	Loss	23–1	Kōki Kameda	UD	12	31 Aug 2011	Nippon Budokan, Tokyo, Japan	For WBA bantamweight title
23	Win	23–0	Victor Rodríguez	TKO	5 (10), 1:55	5 Mar 2011	Auditorio Ernesto Rufo, Rosarito, Mexico	
22	Win	22–0	Victoriano Núñez	RTD	4 (10), 3:00	25 Oct 2010	El Foro, Tijuana, Mexico	
21	Win	21–0	Elvis García	UD	12	24 Jul 2010	Caliente Racetrack, Tijuana, Mexico	Retained WBC FECARBOX bantamweight title
20	Win	20–0	Jovanny Soto	TKO	7 (12), 2:41	10 Apr 2010	Palenque del Parque Morelos, Tijuana, Mexico	Won vacant WBC FECARBOX bantamweight title
19	Win	19–0	Carlos Ruiz	TKO	1 (6), 1:06	19 Dec 2009	Arena ITSON, Ciudad Obregón, Mexico	
18	Win	18–0	Luis Valdez	TKO	6 (10), 1:09	5 Sep 2009	Auditorio Municipal, Tijuana, Mexico	
17	Win	17–0	Benjamin García	UD	8	31 Jul 2009	Pechanga Resort & Casino, Temecula, California, U.S.	
16	Win	16–0	Alex Becerra	UD	6	1 May 2009	Chumash Casino Resort, Santa Ynez, California, U.S.	
15	Win	15–0	Eduardo Avaca	KO	1 (6)	11 Oct 2008	Auditorio Centenario, Torreón, Mexico	
14	Win	14–0	Baltasar Morales	RTD	7 (10), 3:00	16 Jun 2008	Auditorio Municipal, Tijuana, Mexico	
13	Win	13–0	Saturnino Nava	UD	6	31 May 2008	Plaza de Toros Fermin Rivera, San Luis Potosí, Mexico	
12	Win	12–0	Juan Valdez	RTD	7 (10), 3:00	14 Apr 2008	Auditorio Municipal, Tijuana, Mexico	
11	Win	11–0	Mauro González	TKO	1 (6), 1:52	31 Mar 2008	Auditorio Municipal, Tijuana, Mexico	
10	Win	10–0	Jorge López	KO	1 (?)	9 Feb 2008	El Fuerte, Sinaloa, Mexico	
9	Win	9–0	Germán Aaron Cota	TKO	2 (4)	1 Dec 2007	Centro Social Rockodile, San Felipe, Mexico	
8	Win	8–0	Roberto Ornelas	UD	4	20 Oct 2007	Autodromo de Go Karts, Cancún, Mexico	
7	Win	7–0	José Álvarez	KO	1 (6), 0:33	10 Sep 2007	El Foro, Tijuana, Mexico	
6	Win	6–0	Daniel Arturo Vega	KO	1 (4), 1:36	3 Sep 2007	El Foro, Tijuana, Mexico	
5	Win	5–0	Germán Meraz	UD	4	13 Aug 2007	El Foro, Tijuana, Mexico	
4	Win	4–0	Jorge Cruz	UD	4	6 Jul 2007	Auditorio Benito Juarez, Los Mochis, Mexico	
3	Win	3–0	José Urías	TKO	2 (4), 0:26	4 Jun 2007	El Foro, Tijuana, Mexico	
2	Win	2–0	Javier Meraz	TKO	2 (4), 2:33	30 Apr 2007	El Foro, Tijuana, Mexico	
1	Win	1–0	Jesús Enrique Grivalja Felix	TKO	2 (4), 0:56	9 Nov 2006	El Foro, Tijuana, Mexico	
