= Márquez–Vázquez rivalry =

Series of boxing matches (2007–2010)

The rivalry between Israel Vázquez and Rafael Márquez was a series of four boxing matches that took place between 2007 and 2010, which has been described as "the most entertaining fight series in recent boxing history", and has been compared with two other notable series of fights in the decade: Arturo Gatti vs Micky Ward and Erik Morales vs Marco Antonio Barrera. The second fight in the series was named Ring Magazine fight of the year for 2007, while the third fight won the award in 2008. The series, which took place in the super bantamweight division, finished even, with both fighters claiming two victories. Although there had been talk of a fifth fight, it had been widely discouraged by the boxing media due to the punishment absorbed by both fighters, with the injuries Vázquez suffered to his eyes a particular concern. Vázquez retired after the fourth match, while Márquez retired in 2013.

== Background ==
Israel Vázquez, born 1977 in Mexico City, made his professional debut in 1995. It took until 2004 for Vázquez to get a world title shot, at which point he had compiled a record of 35 victories and 3 losses. He won the world title at his first opportunity by knocking down the IBF super bantamweight champion José Luis Valbuena twice en route to a twelfth round technical knockout. He defended the title twice - against Artyom Simonyan and Armando Guerrero. Although he was stripped of the IBF belt, he was able to win the WBC version of the title by knocking out Oscar Larios in the third round of their 2005 contest, Vázquez was also awarded the Ring Magazine Jr. Featherweight title for this victory. After a successful first defence of his title against Ivan Hernandez Vázquez fought Jhonny González in what was described as a fight of the year contender. After being knocked down in the fourth and sixth rounds Vázquez recovered to knock González down twice forcing González's corner to throw in the towel.

Rafael Márquez, born 1975 in Mexico City, also made his professional debut in 1995. Márquez became a world champion for the first time in 2003 when he scored a tenth-round technical knockout victory over Tim Austin for the IBF title. Unlike Vázquez, who won his first world title in the super bantamweight division, Márquez's first world title came at bantamweight. In the first defence of his title Márquez beat Mauricio Pastrana by unanimous decision. Márquez defended his title three times in 2004 with knockout victories over Peter Frissina, Heriberto Ruiz and Pastrana. Another two successful defences followed in 2005 with victories over Ricardo Vargas and Silence Mabuza. In his only fight of 2006 Márquez knocked out Mabuza in a rematch, which brought his total number of title defences to seven. It was to be his final fight at bantamweight as following this bout Márquez would step up in weight to challenge Vázquez for the WBC, The Ring and Lineal super bantamweight titles.

== First fight ==
Israel Vázquez vs. Rafael Márquez
- Date: March 3, 2007
- Venue: Home Depot Center, Carson, California, U.S.
- Title(s) on the line: WBC and The Ring super bantamweight titles

Tale of the tape
Boxer	Israel Vázquez	Rafael Márquez
Nickname	"Magnifico"	
Hometown	Mexico City, Ciudad de México, Mexico	Mexico City, Ciudad de México, Mexico
Pre-fight record	41–3 (31 KO)	36–3 (32 KO)
Age	29 years, 2 months	31 years, 11 months
Height	5 ft 5 1/2 in (166 cm)	5 ft 5 1/2 in (166 cm)
Weight	121 1/2 lb (55 kg)	121 3/4 lb (55 kg)
Style	Orthodox	Orthodox
Recognition	WBC and The Ring; Super Bantamweight Champion	IBF; Bantamweight Champion; The Ring; No. 1 Ranked Bantamweight; The Ring No. 7 ranked pound-for-pound fighter

Result
- Márquez won by seventh-round retirement

The first bout between Vázquez and Márquez was much anticipated in the boxing media and had been described as a "sensational action fight". Both boxers agreed with this sentiment, with Vázquez claiming that it was "going to be the fight of the year" and Márquez stating that the fight was "going to be a brawl". Although Vázquez accepted that Márquez would be the most dangerous opponent he had ever faced, he believed that as the naturally heavier man he would have the advantage. However, Márquez claimed that he felt much stronger at super bantamweight and that at this weight he would be just as powerful.

=== The fight ===
As predicted, the fight turned out to be a brawl, with both boxers landing heavy punches throughout the fight. The early portion of the fight was dominated by Márquez and with his greater hand speed and combinations he was able to land an uppercut which broke Vázquez's nose in the opening round. Vázquez would make a strong comeback in the third round as he was able to knock Márquez down. Márquez rose from the canvas at the count of three, although he was on unsteady legs, he managed to see out the remainder of the round. By the end of the fifth round Vázquez's broken nose had become a major problem with Vázquez telling his cornerman Freddie Roach: "I can't continue". Despite this, the fight continued for two more fast-paced rounds before Vázquez finally retired on his stool at the end of round seven claiming: "I can't anymore. I can't anymore".

As a result, Márquez was announced as the winner and the new champion.

=== Undercard ===
Confirmed bouts:

=== Broadcasting ===
Country	Broadcaster
United States	Showtime

Preceded by vs. Jhonny González	Israel Vázquez's bouts 3 March 2007	Succeeded by Rematch
Preceded by vs. Silence Mabuza II	Rafael Márquez's bouts 3 March 2007	Succeeded by Rematch

== Second fight ==
Rafael Márquez vs. Israel Vázquez II
- Date: August 4, 2007
- Venue: Dodge Arena, Hidalgo, Texas, U.S.
- Title(s) on the line: WBC and The Ring super bantamweight titles

Tale of the tape
Boxer	Rafael Márquez	Israel Vázquez
Nickname		"Magnifico"
Hometown	Mexico City, Ciudad de México, Mexico	Mexico City, Ciudad de México, Mexico
Pre-fight record	37–3 (33 KO)	41–4 (31 KO)
Age	32 years, 4 months	29 years, 7 months
Height	5 ft 5 1/2 in (166 cm)	5 ft 5 1/2 in (166 cm)
Weight	121 lb (55 kg)	121 lb (55 kg)
Style	Orthodox	Orthodox
Recognition	WBC and The Ring; Super Bantamweight Champion; The Ring No. 3 ranked pound-for-pound fighter 2-division world champion	WBC; No. 1 Ranked Super Bantamweight; The Ring; No. 2 Ranked Super Bantamweight; Former super bantamweight champion

Result
- Vázquez won by sixth-round technical knockout

A rematch between the two fighters was originally scheduled for July but had to be pushed back to August.

After his success in the first fight Márquez predicted that he would once again win by knockout. Before the rematch Vázquez had to hire Rudy Perez as his new trainer as his previous trainer opted out of the bout. Roach claimed that Vázquez should have taken more time off and that he was starting to slur his words. However, Vázquez, in reference to his nose injuries in the first fight, said that he wanted to show in the rematch that he could beat Márquez when he was healthy.

=== The fight ===
The rematch was considered to be even greater than the first fight, with Ring Magazine announcing it has its fight of the year for 2007.

The action peaked in round three - a round that would later win the Ring Magazine round of the year award. Both fighters exchanged heavy punches throughout the third round with Márquez suffering a cut over his right eye, Márquez was able to respond with a series of overhand rights which opened cuts over both of Vázquez's eyes. The Blood would continue to flow from Vázquez's left eye throughout the fight. During the sixth round Vázquez was able to knock Márquez down with a heavy hook to the head, and although Márquez was able to rise from the canvas, the referee, Jose Guadalupe Garcia, stopped the action after Vázquez landed another series of punches, thus Vázquez reclaimed his title.

=== Aftermath ===
It was felt by both Márquez and Showtime analyst Al Bernstein that the referee's stoppage was premature. Despite this, the referee claimed that his stoppage was justified.

Following the bout both boxers expressed their eagerness for a third fight to happen.

=== Undercard ===
Confirmed bouts:

=== Broadcasting ===
Country	Broadcaster
United States	Showtime

Preceded by First bout	Rafael Márquez's bouts 4 August 2007	Succeeded by Second Rematch
Preceded by First bout	Israel Vázquez's bouts 4 August 2007	Succeeded by Second Rematch
Awards
Preceded by Somsak Sithchatchawal vs. Mahyar Monshipour	The Ring Fight of the Year; 2007	Succeeded by Israel Vázquez vs. Rafael Márquez III
Preceded by Somsak Sithchatchawal vs. Mahyar Monshipour	The Ring Round of the Year; Round 3; 2007	Succeeded by Israel Vázquez vs. Rafael Márquez III

== Third fight ==
Israel Vázquez vs. Rafael Márquez III
- Date: March 1, 2008
- Venue: Home Depot Center, Carson, California, U.S.
- Title(s) on the line: WBC and The Ring super bantamweight titles

Tale of the tape
Boxer	Israel Vázquez	Rafael Márquez
Nickname	"Magnifico"	
Hometown	Mexico City, Ciudad de México, Mexico	Mexico City, Ciudad de México, Mexico
Pre-fight record	42–4 (32 KO)	37–4 (33 KO)
Age	30 years, 2 months	32 years, 11 months
Height	5 ft 5 1/2 in (166 cm)	5 ft 5 1/2 in (166 cm)
Weight	122 lb (55 kg)	121 1/2 lb (55 kg)
Style	Orthodox	Orthodox
Recognition	WBC and The Ring; Super Bantamweight Champion; The Ring No. 6 ranked pound-for-pound fighter	WBC; No. 2 Ranked Super Bantamweight; The Ring; No. 1 Ranked Super Bantamweight; The Ring No. 10 ranked pound-for-pound fighter 2-division world champion

Result
- Vázquez won by split decision

It was not until over seven months later that the fighters met for a third time as they returned to the site of their first encounter, the Home Depot Center in Carson. Once again the fight was expected to be a war, in spite of this, Márquez claimed that he would have to box intelligently to reclaim his title. This was in contrast to Vázquez's opinion of the fight as he stated: "If he wants to beat me, he has to fight me blow-by-blow. No other way around it".

=== The fight ===
The fight, which once again won the award for Ring Magazine fight of year, saw both fighters engaged in non-stop action and, unlike the first two encounters, went the full twelve round distance. Márquez controlled the early action of the fight by landed effective jabs and right hands, although Vázquez was able to land hard shots intermittently. Márquez underlined his dominance in the fight by sending Vázquez to the canvas with a hard right hand in the fourth round. Vázquez survived the knockdown and would go on to hurt Márquez several times in a round that was named round of the year by Ring Magazine. The fighters were evenly matched over the middle portion of the fight with Vázquez, once again, fighting with deep cuts over his eyes. Márquez suffered a setback in the tenth round when he was docked a point for persistent low blows. Late in the final round Márquez was badly hurt from a heavy barrage of punches and with only seconds to go in the fight Vázquez scored a knockdown when the referee deemed that only the ropes were keeping Márquez from going down. Although Márquez was able to recover to hear the final bell, it was Vázquez who was announced as the winner by split decision. One judge scored the bout 114–111 in favour of Márquez but this was overruled by scores of 114-111 and 113-112 for Vázquez.

=== Aftermath ===
The result of the fight was disputed by Márquez and his promoter Gary Shaw. They claimed that Márquez should not have been penalised a point in round ten and that Vázquez should not have been credited with a knockdown in the final round. Despite their protestations, the result of the fight stood.

=== Undercard ===
Confirmed bouts:

=== Broadcasting ===
Country	Broadcaster
United States	Showtime

Preceded by First rematch	Israel Vázquez's bouts 1 March 2008	Succeeded by vs. Angel Antonio Priolo
Preceded by First rematch	Rafael Márquez's bouts 1 March 2008	Succeeded by vs. Jose Francisco Mendoza
Awards
Preceded by Rafael Márquez vs. Israel Vázquez II	The Ring Fight of the Year; 2008	Succeeded by Juan Manuel Márquez vs. Juan Díaz
Preceded by Rafael Márquez vs. Israel Vázquez II; Round 3	The Ring Round of the Year; Round 4; 2008	Succeeded by Marcos Maidana vs. Victor Ortiz; Round 1
Preceded by Jermain Taylor vs. Kelly Pavlik	Harry Markson Award; 2008	Succeeded by Juan Manuel Márquez vs. Juan Díaz

== Fourth fight ==
Israel Vázquez vs. Rafael Márquez IV
- Date: May 22, 2010
- Venue: Staples Center, Los Angeles, California, U.S.
- Title(s) on the line: vacant WBC Silver featherweight title

Tale of the tape
Boxer	Israel Vázquez	Rafael Márquez
Nickname	"Magnifico"	
Hometown	Mexico City, Ciudad de México, Mexico	Mexico City, Ciudad de México, Mexico
Pre-fight record	44–4 (34 KO)	38–5 (34 KO)
Age	32 years, 4 months	35 years, 1 month
Height	5 ft 5 1/2 in (166 cm)	5 ft 5 1/2 in (166 cm)
Weight	125 1/2 lb (57 kg)	125 1/2 lb (57 kg)
Style	Orthodox	Orthodox
Recognition	WBC/WBO; No. 1 Ranked Featherweight; Former super bantamweight champion	WBO; No. 2 Ranked Featherweight; WBA; No. 4 Ranked Featherweight; WBC; No. 2 Ranked Super Bantamweight; IBF; No. 7 Ranked Super Bantamweight; 2-division world champion

Result
- Márquez won by third-round knockout

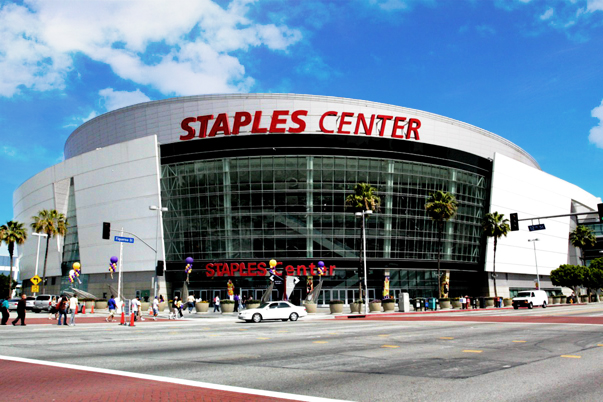
The Staples Center, the scene of the fourth fight.

Due to the punishing nature of their previous three fights both boxers were out of action for over a year before they returned to the ring. Márquez returned first and made a winning comeback with an easy third-round knockout over Jose Francisco Mendoza in May 2009. Vázquez, who needed three surgeries on his damaged retina following the third fight, returned in October 2009 and struggled to a ninth round win over Angel Antonio Priolo. Following his victory Márquez would remain inactive for almost another year as a fourth fight between him and Vázquez was scheduled for May 2010. Due to Vázquez's inactivity he was stripped of his title, meaning that the fourth meeting between the pair would be a non-title fight. Márquez, who was a greater than 2-1 favourite for the fight, once again predicted that he would be victorious by knockout.

=== The fight ===
The fourth fight between Vázquez and Márquez was generally considered to be the least entertaining of the series. The fight was also the most one-sided of the series with Márquez easily outboxing Vázquez. After a dominating opening round for Márquez he was able to open a deep cut over Vázquez's left eye in the second round before opening another over his right eye in the third. The cuts left Vázquez's vision severely impaired. Not helped by his poor vision, Vázquez was knocked down early in round three by a Márquez right hand. Although Vázquez was able to beat the referee's count, he was to be stopped later in the round after taking a series of heavy shots.

=== Aftermath ===
After Márquez was declared the winner, and with the series standing equal, both fighters expressed an interest in a fifth meeting. This has not been encouraged by the boxing media and even Frank Espinoza, Vazquez's longtime handler, stated that "His career is over" This opinion was echoed by several other boxing writers who claimed that, due to the injuries Vazquez suffered to his eyes, he should retire. Instead of a fifth fight with Vázquez, Márquez fought Juan Manuel López and lost after failing to come out for the ninth round.

=== Undercard ===
Confirmed bouts:

=== Broadcasting ===
Country	Broadcaster
United States	Showtime

Preceded by vs. Angel Antonio Priolo	Israel Vázquez's bouts 22 May 2010	Retired
Preceded by vs. Jose Francisco Mendoza	Rafael Márquez's bouts 22 May 2010	Succeeded by vs. Juan Manuel López
