= List of The Ring pound for pound rankings (2000s) =

Boxing magazine The Ring began naming the top 10 pound for pound boxers in 1989. The first #1 pound for pound fighter was heavyweight champion Mike Tyson. To reduce the number of tables, a table is only added if there are changes in the rankings. For WBA titles, only titles in the primary champion lineage are listed.

== 2009 ==
November 8, 2009
Changes	Rank	Boxer	Record	Weight class	Title(s)
—N/a	1	Manny Pacquiao	49–3–2 (37 KO)	Light welterweight	The Ring
—N/a	2	Floyd Mayweather Jr.	40–0 (25 KO)	Welterweight	—N/a
—N/a	3	Shane Mosley	46–5 (39 KO)	Welterweight	WBA (Super)
—N/a	4	Bernard Hopkins	49–5–1–1 (32 KO)	Light heavyweight	—N/a
—N/a	5	Juan Manuel Márquez	50–5–1 (37 KO)	Lightweight	WBA (Super), WBO, and The Ring
—N/a	6	Nonito Donaire	22–1 (14 KO)	Super flyweight	—N/a
—N/a	7	Miguel Cotto	34–1 (27 KO)	Welterweight	WBO
—N/a	8	Celestino Caballero	33–2 (23 KO)	Super bantamweight	WBA (Unified) and IBF
New	9	Chad Dawson	29–0 (17 KO)	Light heavyweight	—N/a
New	10	Paul Williams	37–1 (27 KO)	Light middleweight	—N/a

October 11, 2009
Changes	Rank	Boxer	Record	Weight class	Title(s)
—N/a	1	Manny Pacquiao	49–3–2 (37 KO)	Light welterweight	The Ring
—N/a	2	Floyd Mayweather Jr.	40–0 (25 KO)	Welterweight	—N/a
—N/a	3	Shane Mosley	46–5 (39 KO)	Welterweight	WBA (Super)
—N/a	4	Bernard Hopkins	49–5–1–1 (32 KO)	Light heavyweight	—N/a
—N/a	5	Juan Manuel Márquez	50–5–1 (37 KO)	Lightweight	WBA (Super), WBO, and The Ring
+2	6	Nonito Donaire	22–1 (14 KO)	Super flyweight	—N/a
+2	7	Miguel Cotto	34–1 (27 KO)	Welterweight	WBO
+2	8	Celestino Caballero	33–2 (23 KO)	Super bantamweight	WBA (Unified) and IBF
-3	9	Israel Vázquez	44–4 (32 KO)	Super bantamweight	—N/a
-3	10	Rafael Márquez	38–5 (34 KO)	Super bantamweight	—N/a

September 21, 2009
Changes	Rank	Boxer	Record	Weight class	Title(s)
—N/a	1	Manny Pacquiao	49–3–2 (37 KO)	Light welterweight	The Ring
New	2	Floyd Mayweather Jr.	40–0 (25 KO)	Welterweight	—N/a
+1	3	Shane Mosley	46–5 (39 KO)	Welterweight	WBA (Super)
-1	4	Bernard Hopkins	49–5–1–1 (32 KO)	Light heavyweight	—N/a
-3	5	Juan Manuel Márquez	50–5–1 (37 KO)	Lightweight	WBA (Super), WBO, and The Ring
-1	6	Israel Vázquez	43–4 (31 KO)	Super bantamweight	—N/a
-1	7	Rafael Márquez	38–5 (34 KO)	Super bantamweight	—N/a
-1	8	Nonito Donaire	22–1 (14 KO)	Super flyweight	—N/a
-1	9	Miguel Cotto	34–1 (27 KO)	Welterweight	WBO
-1	10	Celestino Caballero	33–2 (23 KO)	Super bantamweight	WBA (Unified) and IBF

July 12, 2009
Changes	Rank	Boxer	Record	Weight class	Title(s)
—N/a	1	Manny Pacquiao	49–3–2 (37 KO)	Light welterweight	The Ring
—N/a	2	Juan Manuel Márquez	50–4–1 (37 KO)	Lightweight	WBA (Super), WBO, and The Ring
—N/a	3	Bernard Hopkins	49–5–1–1 (32 KO)	Light heavyweight	—N/a
—N/a	4	Shane Mosley	46–5 (39 KO)	Welterweight	WBA (Super)
—N/a	5	Israel Vázquez	43–4 (31 KO)	Super bantamweight	—N/a
—N/a	6	Rafael Márquez	38–5 (34 KO)	Super bantamweight	—N/a
—N/a	7	Nonito Donaire	21–1 (14 KO)	Flyweight	—N/a
+1	8	Miguel Cotto	34–1 (27 KO)	Welterweight	WBO
+1	9	Celestino Caballero	32–2 (22 KO)	Super bantamweight	WBA (Unified) and IBF
New	10	Paul Williams	37–1 (27 KO)	Light middleweight	—N/a

July 5, 2009
Changes	Rank	Boxer	Record	Weight class	Title(s)
—N/a	1	Manny Pacquiao	49–3–2 (37 KO)	Light welterweight	The Ring
—N/a	2	Juan Manuel Márquez	50–4–1 (37 KO)	Lightweight	WBA (Super), WBO, and The Ring
—N/a	3	Bernard Hopkins	49–5–1–1 (32 KO)	Light heavyweight	—N/a
—N/a	4	Shane Mosley	46–5 (39 KO)	Welterweight	WBA (Super)
—N/a	5	Israel Vázquez	43–4 (31 KO)	Super bantamweight	—N/a
—N/a	6	Rafael Márquez	38–5 (34 KO)	Super bantamweight	—N/a
+1	7	Nonito Donaire	21–1 (14 KO)	Flyweight	IBF
+1	8	Vic Darchinyan	32–1–1 (26 KO)	Super flyweight	WBA (Undisputed), WBC, and IBF
-2	9	Miguel Cotto	34–1 (27 KO)	Welterweight	WBO
—N/a	10	Celestino Caballero	32–2 (22 KO)	Super bantamweight	WBA (Unified) and IBF

May 3, 2009
Changes	Rank	Boxer	Record	Weight class	Title(s)
—N/a	1	Manny Pacquiao	49–3–2 (37 KO)	Light welterweight	The Ring
—N/a	2	Juan Manuel Márquez	50–4–1 (37 KO)	Lightweight	WBA (Super), WBO, and The Ring
—N/a	3	Bernard Hopkins	49–5–1–1 (32 KO)	Light heavyweight	—N/a
+1	4	Shane Mosley	46–5 (39 KO)	Welterweight	WBA (Super)
-1	5	Israel Vázquez	43–4 (31 KO)	Super bantamweight	The Ring
—N/a	6	Rafael Márquez	38–5 (34 KO)	Super bantamweight	—N/a
New	7	Miguel Cotto	33–1 (27 KO)	Welterweight	WBO
New	8	Nonito Donaire	21–1 (14 KO)	Flyweight	IBF
+1	9	Vic Darchinyan	32–1–1 (26 KO)	Super flyweight	WBA (Undisputed), WBC, and IBF
-1	10	Celestino Caballero	32–2 (22 KO)	Super bantamweight	WBA (Unified) and IBF

February 8, 2009
Changes	Rank	Boxer	Record	Weight class	Title(s)
—N/a	1	Manny Pacquiao	48–3–2 (36 KO)	Lightweight	WBC
—N/a	2	Juan Manuel Márquez	49–4–1 (36 KO)	Lightweight	The Ring
—N/a	3	Bernard Hopkins	49–5–1–1 (32 KO)	Light heavyweight	—N/a
+1	4	Israel Vázquez	43–4 (31 KO)	Super bantamweight	The Ring
+1	5	Shane Mosley	46–5 (39 KO)	Welterweight	WBA (Super)
+1	6	Rafael Márquez	37–5 (33 KO)	Super bantamweight	—N/a
+1	7	Iván Calderón	32–0 (6 KO)	Light flyweight	WBO and The Ring
+1	8	Ricky Hatton	45–1 (32 KO)	Light welterweight	The Ring
+1	9	Celestino Caballero	31–2 (22 KO)	Super bantamweight	WBA (Unified) and IBF
New	10	Vic Darchinyan	31–1–1 (26 KO)	Super flyweight	WBA (Undisputed), WBC, and IBF

January 26, 2009
Changes	Rank	Boxer	Record	Weight class	Title(s)
—N/a	1	Manny Pacquiao	48–3–2 (36 KO)	Lightweight	WBC
—N/a	2	Juan Manuel Márquez	49–4–1 (36 KO)	Lightweight	The Ring
—N/a	3	Joe Calzaghe	46–0 (32 KO)	Light heavyweight	The Ring
—N/a	4	Bernard Hopkins	49–5–1–1 (32 KO)	Light heavyweight	—N/a
—N/a	5	Israel Vázquez	43–4 (31 KO)	Super bantamweight	The Ring
New	6	Shane Mosley	46–5 (39 KO)	Welterweight	WBA (Super)
—N/a	7	Rafael Márquez	37–5 (33 KO)	Super bantamweight	—N/a
+1	8	Iván Calderón	32–0 (6 KO)	Light flyweight	WBO and The Ring
+1	9	Ricky Hatton	45–1 (32 KO)	Light welterweight	The Ring
New	10	Celestino Caballero	31–2 (22 KO)	Super bantamweight	WBA (Unified) and IBF

== 2008 ==
November 24, 2008
Changes	Rank	Boxer	Record	Weight class	Title(s)
—N/a	1	Manny Pacquiao	48–3–2 (37 KO)	Lightweight	WBC
—N/a	2	Juan Manuel Márquez	49–4–1 (36 KO)	Lightweight	The Ring
—N/a	3	Joe Calzaghe	46–0 (32 KO)	Light heavyweight	The Ring
—N/a	4	Bernard Hopkins	49–5–1–1 (32 KO)	Light heavyweight	—N/a
—N/a	5	Israel Vázquez	43–4 (31 KO)	Super bantamweight	WBC and The Ring
—N/a	6	Antonio Margarito	37–5– (27 KO)	Welterweight	WBA (Super)
—N/a	7	Rafael Márquez	37–5 (33 KO)	Super bantamweight	—N/a
—N/a	8	Miguel Cotto	32–1 (26 KO)	Welterweight	—N/a
—N/a	9	Iván Calderón	32–0 (6 KO)	Light flyweight	WBO and The Ring
New	10	Ricky Hatton	45–1 (32 KO)	Light welterweight	The Ring

November 3, 2008
Changes	Rank	Boxer	Record	Weight class	Title(s)
—N/a	1	Manny Pacquiao	47–3–2 (36 KO)	Lightweight	WBC
—N/a	2	Juan Manuel Márquez	49–4–1 (36 KO)	Lightweight	The Ring
—N/a	3	Joe Calzaghe	45–0 (32 KO)	Light heavyweight	The Ring
—N/a	4	Bernard Hopkins	48–5–1–1 (32 KO)	Light heavyweight	—N/a
—N/a	5	Israel Vázquez	43–4 (31 KO)	Super bantamweight	WBC and The Ring
—N/a	6	Antonio Margarito	37–5 (27 KO)	Welterweight	WBA (Super)
+1	7	Rafael Márquez	37–5 (33 KO)	Super bantamweight	—N/a
+1	8	Miguel Cotto	32–1 (26 KO)	Welterweight	—N/a
+1	9	Iván Calderón	32–0 (6 KO)	Light flyweight	WBO and The Ring
New	10	Paul Williams	35–1 (26 KO)	Welterweight	WBO

October 27, 2008
Changes	Rank	Boxer	Record	Weight class	Title(s)
—N/a	1	Manny Pacquiao	47–3–2 (36 KO)	Lightweight	WBC
—N/a	2	Juan Manuel Márquez	49–4–1 (36 KO)	Lightweight	The Ring
—N/a	3	Joe Calzaghe	45–0 (32 KO)	Light heavyweight	The Ring
—N/a	4	Bernard Hopkins	48–5–1–1 (32 KO)	Light heavyweight	—N/a
—N/a	5	Israel Vázquez	43–4 (31 KO)	Super bantamweight	WBC and The Ring
—N/a	6	Antonio Margarito	37–5 (27 KO)	Welterweight	WBA (Super)
+1	7	Cristian Mijares	36–3–2 (15 KO)	Super flyweight	WBA (Unified) and WBC
+1	8	Rafael Márquez	37–5 (33 KO)	Super bantamweight	—N/a
+1	9	Miguel Cotto	32–1 (26 KO)	Welterweight	—N/a
New	10	Iván Calderón	31–0 (6 KO)	Light flyweight	WBO and The Ring

September 22, 2008
Changes	Rank	Boxer	Record	Weight class	Title(s)
—N/a	1	Manny Pacquiao	47–3–2 (36 KO)	Lightweight	WBC
+1	2	Juan Manuel Márquez	49–4–1 (36 KO)	Lightweight	The Ring
-1	3	Joe Calzaghe	45–0 (32 KO)	Super middleweight Light heavyweight	WBA (Undisputed), WBO, and The Ring The Ring
—N/a	4	Bernard Hopkins	48–5–1–1 (32 KO)	Light heavyweight	—N/a
—N/a	5	Israel Vázquez	43–4 (31 KO)	Super bantamweight	WBC and The Ring
—N/a	6	Antonio Margarito	37–5 (27 KO)	Welterweight	WBA
—N/a	7	Kelly Pavlik	34–0 (30 KO)	Middleweight	WBC, WBO, and The Ring
—N/a	8	Cristian Mijares	36–3–2 (15 KO)	Super flyweight	WBA (Unified) and WBC
—N/a	9	Rafael Márquez	37–5 (33 KO)	Super bantamweight	—N/a
—N/a	10	Miguel Cotto	32–1 (26 KO)	Welterweight	—N/a

August 18, 2008
Changes	Rank	Boxer	Record	Weight class	Title(s)
—N/a	1	Manny Pacquiao	47–3–2 (36 KO)	Lightweight	WBC
—N/a	2	Joe Calzaghe	45–0 (32 KO)	Super middleweight Light heavyweight	WBA (Undisputed), WBO, and The Ring The Ring
—N/a	3	Juan Manuel Márquez	48–4–1 (35 KO)	Super featherweight	—N/a
—N/a	4	Bernard Hopkins	48–5–1–1 (32 KO)	Light heavyweight	—N/a
—N/a	5	Israel Vázquez	43–4 (31 KO)	Super bantamweight	WBC and The Ring
New	6	Antonio Margarito	37–5 (27 KO)	Welterweight	WBA
—N/a	7	Kelly Pavlik	34–0 (30 KO)	Middleweight	WBC, WBO, and The Ring
—N/a	8	Cristian Mijares	35–3–2 (14 KO)	Super flyweight	WBA (Unified) and WBC
—N/a	9	Rafael Márquez	37–5 (33 KO)	Super bantamweight	—N/a
-4	10	Miguel Cotto	32–1 (26 KO)	Welterweight	—N/a

June 9, 2008
Changes	Rank	Boxer	Record	Weight class	Title(s)
+1	1	Manny Pacquiao	46–3–2 (35 KO)	Super featherweight	WBC and The Ring
+1	2	Joe Calzaghe	45–0 (32 KO)	Super middleweight Light heavyweight	WBA (Undisputed), WBC, WBO, and The Ring The Ring
+1	3	Juan Manuel Márquez	48–4–1 (35 KO)	Super featherweight	—N/a
+1	4	Bernard Hopkins	48–5–1–1 (32 KO)	Light heavyweight	—N/a
+1	5	Israel Vázquez	43–4 (31 KO)	Super bantamweight	WBC and The Ring
+1	6	Miguel Cotto	32–0 (26 KO)	Welterweight	WBA
+2	7	Kelly Pavlik	34–0 (30 KO)	Middleweight	WBC, WBO, and The Ring
+2	8	Cristian Mijares	35–3–2 (14 KO)	Super flyweight	WBA (Unified) and WBC
New	9	Rafael Márquez	37–5 (33 KO)	Super bantamweight	—N/a
New	10	Iván Calderón	31–0 (6 KO)	Light flyweight	WBO and The Ring

May 19, 2008
Changes	Rank	Boxer	Record	Weight class	Title(s)
—N/a	1	Floyd Mayweather Jr.	39–0 (25 KO)	Welterweight	WBC and The Ring
—N/a	2	Manny Pacquiao	46–3–2 (35 KO)	Super featherweight	WBC and The Ring
—N/a	3	Joe Calzaghe	45–0 (32 KO)	Super middleweight Light heavyweight	WBA (Undisputed), WBC, WBO, and The Ring The Ring
—N/a	4	Juan Manuel Márquez	48–4–1 (35 KO)	Super featherweight	—N/a
—N/a	5	Bernard Hopkins	48–5–1–1 (32 KO)	Light heavyweight	—N/a
—N/a	6	Israel Vázquez	43–4 (31 KO)	Super bantamweight	WBC and The Ring
—N/a	7	Miguel Cotto	32–0 (26 KO)	Welterweight	WBA
—N/a	8	Ricky Hatton	43–1 (31 KO)	Light welterweight	The Ring
—N/a	9	Kelly Pavlik	33–0 (29 KO)	Middleweight	WBC, WBO, and The Ring
New	10	Cristian Mijares	35–3–2 (14 KO)	Super flyweight	WBA (Unified) and WBC

April 28, 2008
Changes	Rank	Boxer	Record	Weight class	Title(s)
—N/a	1	Floyd Mayweather Jr.	39–0 (25 KO)	Welterweight	WBC and The Ring
—N/a	2	Manny Pacquiao	46–3–2 (35 KO)	Super featherweight	WBC and The Ring
+2	3	Joe Calzaghe	45–0 (32 KO)	Super middleweight Light heavyweight	WBA (Undisputed), WBC, WBO, and The Ring The Ring
-1	4	Juan Manuel Márquez	48–4–1 (35 KO)	Super featherweight	—N/a
-1	5	Bernard Hopkins	48–5–1–1 (32 KO)	Light heavyweight	—N/a
—N/a	6	Israel Vázquez	43–4 (31 KO)	Super bantamweight	WBC and The Ring
—N/a	7	Miguel Cotto	32–0 (26 KO)	Welterweight	WBA
—N/a	8	Ricky Hatton	43–1 (31 KO)	Light welterweight	The Ring
—N/a	9	Kelly Pavlik	33–0 (29 KO)	Middleweight	WBC, WBO, and The Ring
—N/a	10	Rafael Márquez	37–5 (33 KO)	Super bantamweight	—N/a

March 10, 2008
Changes	Rank	Boxer	Record	Weight class	Title(s)
—N/a	1	Floyd Mayweather Jr.	39–0 (25 KO)	Welterweight	WBC and The Ring
—N/a	2	Manny Pacquiao	45–3–2 (35 KO)	Super featherweight	—N/a
—N/a	3	Juan Manuel Márquez	48–3–1 (35 KO)	Super featherweight	WBC
—N/a	4	Bernard Hopkins	48–4–1–1 (32 KO)	Light heavyweight	The Ring
—N/a	5	Joe Calzaghe	44–0 (32 KO)	Super middleweight	WBA (Undisputed), WBC, WBO, and The Ring
—N/a	6	Israel Vázquez	43–4 (31 KO)	Super bantamweight	WBC and The Ring
—N/a	7	Miguel Cotto	31–0 (25 KO)	Welterweight	WBA
—N/a	8	Ricky Hatton	43–1 (31 KO)	Light welterweight	The Ring
New	9	Kelly Pavlik	33–0 (29 KO)	Middleweight	WBC, WBO, and The Ring
—N/a	10	Rafael Márquez	37–5 (33 KO)	Super bantamweight	—N/a

== 2007 ==
November 12, 2007
Changes	Rank	Boxer	Record	Weight class	Title(s)
—N/a	1	Floyd Mayweather Jr.	38–0 (24 KO)	Welterweight	WBC and The Ring
—N/a	2	Manny Pacquiao	45–3–2 (35 KO)	Super featherweight	—N/a
—N/a	3	Juan Manuel Márquez	48–3–1 (35 KO)	Super featherweight	WBC
—N/a	4	Bernard Hopkins	48–4–1–1 (32 KO)	Light heavyweight	The Ring
—N/a	5	Joe Calzaghe	44–0 (32 KO)	Super middleweight	WBA (Undisputed), WBC, WBO, and The Ring
—N/a	6	Israel Vázquez	42–4 (31 KO)	Super bantamweight	WBC and The Ring
+3	7	Miguel Cotto	31–0 (25 KO)	Welterweight	WBA
+1	8	Ricky Hatton	43–0 (31 KO)	Light welterweight	The Ring
-2	9	Winky Wright	51–4–1 (25 KO)	Light heavyweight	—N/a
-2	10	Rafael Márquez	37–4 (33 KO)	Super bantamweight	—N/a

November 5, 2007
Changes	Rank	Boxer	Record	Weight class	Title(s)
—N/a	1	Floyd Mayweather Jr.	38–0 (24 KO)	Welterweight	WBC and The Ring
—N/a	2	Manny Pacquiao	45–3–2 (35 KO)	Super featherweight	—N/a
—N/a	3	Juan Manuel Márquez	48–3–1 (35 KO)	Super featherweight	WBC
—N/a	4	Bernard Hopkins	48–4–1–1 (32 KO)	Light heavyweight	The Ring
+3	5	Joe Calzaghe	44–0 (32 KO)	Super middleweight	WBA (Undisputed), WBC, WBO, and The Ring
-1	6	Israel Vázquez	42–4 (31 KO)	Super bantamweight	WBC and The Ring
-1	7	Winky Wright	51–4–1 (25 KO)	Light heavyweight	—N/a
-1	8	Rafael Márquez	37–4 (33 KO)	Super bantamweight	—N/a
—N/a	9	Ricky Hatton	43–0 (31 KO)	Light welterweight	The Ring
—N/a	10	Miguel Cotto	30–0 (25 KO)	Welterweight	WBA

August 7, 2007
Changes	Rank	Boxer	Record	Weight class	Title(s)
—N/a	1	Floyd Mayweather Jr.	38–0 (24 KO)	Welterweight	WBC and The Ring
—N/a	2	Manny Pacquiao	44–3–2 (35 KO)	Super featherweight	—N/a
+1	3	Juan Manuel Márquez	47–3–1 (35 KO)	Super featherweight	WBC
+1	4	Bernard Hopkins	48–4–1–1 (32 KO)	Light heavyweight	The Ring
New	5	Israel Vázquez	42–4 (31 KO)	Super bantamweight	WBC and The Ring
—N/a	6	Winky Wright	51–4–1 (25 KO)	Light heavyweight	—N/a
-4	7	Rafael Márquez	37–4 (33 KO)	Super bantamweight	—N/a
-1	8	Joe Calzaghe	43–0 (32 KO)	Super middleweight	WBO and The Ring
-1	9	Ricky Hatton	43–0 (31 KO)	Light welterweight	The Ring
—N/a	10	Miguel Cotto	30–0 (25 KO)	Welterweight	WBA

July 30, 2007
Changes	Rank	Boxer	Record	Weight class	Title(s)
—N/a	1	Floyd Mayweather Jr.	38–0 (24 KO)	Welterweight	WBC and The Ring
—N/a	2	Manny Pacquiao	44–3–2 (35 KO)	Super featherweight	—N/a
—N/a	3	Rafael Márquez	37–3 (33 KO)	Super bantamweight	WBC and The Ring
—N/a	4	Juan Manuel Márquez	47–3–1 (35 KO)	Super featherweight	WBC
+1	5	Bernard Hopkins	48–4–1–1 (32 KO)	Light heavyweight	The Ring
-1	6	Winky Wright	51–4–1 (25 KO)	Middleweight	—N/a
—N/a	7	Joe Calzaghe	43–0 (32 KO)	Super middleweight	WBO and The Ring
—N/a	8	Ricky Hatton	43–0 (31 KO)	Light welterweight	The Ring
—N/a	9	Marco Antonio Barrera	63–5–0–1 (42 KO)	Super featherweight	—N/a
—N/a	10	Miguel Cotto	30–0 (25 KO)	Welterweight	WBA

July 2, 2007
Changes	Rank	Boxer	Record	Weight class	Title(s)
—N/a	1	Floyd Mayweather Jr.	38–0 (24 KO)	Welterweight	WBC and The Ring
—N/a	2	Manny Pacquiao	44–3–2 (35 KO)	Super featherweight	—N/a
—N/a	3	Rafael Márquez	37–3 (33 KO)	Super bantamweight	WBC and The Ring
—N/a	4	Juan Manuel Márquez	47–3–1 (35 KO)	Super featherweight	WBC
—N/a	5	Winky Wright	51–3–1 (25 KO)	Middleweight	—N/a
—N/a	6	Bernard Hopkins	47–4–1–1 (32 KO)	Light heavyweight	The Ring
—N/a	7	Joe Calzaghe	43–0 (32 KO)	Super middleweight	WBO and The Ring
+1	8	Ricky Hatton	43–0 (31 KO)	Light welterweight	The Ring
-1	9	Marco Antonio Barrera	63–5–0–1 (42 KO)	Super featherweight	—N/a
New	10	Miguel Cotto	30–0 (25 KO)	Welterweight	WBA

June 4, 2007
Changes	Rank	Boxer	Record	Weight class	Title(s)
—N/a	1	Floyd Mayweather Jr.	38–0 (24 KO)	Welterweight Light middleweight	WBC and The Ring WBC
—N/a	2	Manny Pacquiao	44–3–2 (35 KO)	Super featherweight	—N/a
—N/a	3	Rafael Márquez	37–3 (33 KO)	Super bantamweight	WBC and The Ring
—N/a	4	Juan Manuel Márquez	47–3–1 (35 KO)	Super featherweight	WBC
—N/a	5	Winky Wright	51–3–1 (25 KO)	Middleweight	—N/a
+1	6	Bernard Hopkins	47–4–1–1 (32 KO)	Light heavyweight	The Ring
+1	7	Joe Calzaghe	43–0 (32 KO)	Super middleweight	WBO and The Ring
+1	8	Marco Antonio Barrera	63–5–0–1 (42 KO)	Super featherweight	—N/a
+1	9	Ricky Hatton	42–0 (30 KO)	Light welterweight	The Ring
-4	10	Jermain Taylor	27–0–1 (17 KO)	Middleweight	WBC, WBO, and The Ring

March 19, 2007
Changes	Rank	Boxer	Record	Weight class	Title(s)
—N/a	1	Floyd Mayweather Jr.	37–0 (24 KO)	Welterweight	WBC and The Ring
—N/a	2	Manny Pacquiao	43–3–2 (34 KO)	Super featherweight	—N/a
+4	3	Rafael Márquez	37–3 (33 KO)	Super bantamweight	WBC and The Ring
New	4	Juan Manuel Márquez	47–3–1 (35 KO)	Super featherweight	WBC
-2	5	Winky Wright	51–3–1 (25 KO)	Middleweight	—N/a
-2	6	Jermain Taylor	26–0–1 (17 KO)	Middleweight	WBC, WBO, and The Ring
-2	7	Bernard Hopkins	47–4–1–1 (32 KO)	Light heavyweight	The Ring
—N/a	8	Joe Calzaghe	42–0 (31 KO)	Super middleweight	WBO and The Ring
-3	9	Marco Antonio Barrera	63–5–0–1 (42 KO)	Super featherweight	—N/a
-1	10	Ricky Hatton	42–0 (30 KO)	Light welterweight	The Ring

February 26, 2007
Changes	Rank	Boxer	Record	Weight class	Title(s)
—N/a	1	Floyd Mayweather Jr.	37–0 (24 KO)	Welterweight	WBC and The Ring
—N/a	2	Manny Pacquiao	43–3–2 (34 KO)	Super featherweight	—N/a
—N/a	3	Winky Wright	51–3–1 (25 KO)	Middleweight	—N/a
—N/a	4	Jermain Taylor	26–0–1 (17 KO)	Middleweight	WBC, WBO, and The Ring
—N/a	5	Bernard Hopkins	47–4–1–1 (32 KO)	Light heavyweight	The Ring
—N/a	6	Marco Antonio Barrera	63–4–0–1 (42 KO)	Super featherweight	WBC
—N/a	7	Rafael Márquez	36–3 (32 KO)	Bantamweight	IBF
—N/a	8	Joe Calzaghe	42–0 (31 KO)	Super middleweight	WBO and The Ring
—N/a	9	Ricky Hatton	42–0 (30 KO)	Light welterweight	IBF and The Ring
New	10	Shane Mosley	44–4 (37 KO)	Welterweight	—N/a

January 22, 2007
Changes	Rank	Boxer	Record	Weight class	Title(s)
—N/a	1	Floyd Mayweather Jr.	37–0 (24 KO)	Welterweight	WBC and The Ring
—N/a	2	Manny Pacquiao	43–3–2 (34 KO)	Super featherweight	—N/a
—N/a	3	Winky Wright	51–3–1 (25 KO)	Middleweight	—N/a
—N/a	4	Jermain Taylor	26–0–1 (17 KO)	Middleweight	WBC, WBO, and The Ring
—N/a	5	Bernard Hopkins	47–4–1–1 (32 KO)	Light heavyweight	The Ring
—N/a	6	Marco Antonio Barrera	63–4–0–1 (42 KO)	Super featherweight	WBC
—N/a	7	Rafael Márquez	36–3 (32 KO)	Bantamweight	IBF
+2	8	Joe Calzaghe	42–0 (31 KO)	Super middleweight	WBO and The Ring
-1	9	Ricky Hatton	42–0 (30 KO)	Light welterweight	IBF and The Ring
New	10	Miguel Cotto	28–0 (23 KO)	Welterweight	WBA

== 2006 ==
November 27, 2006
Changes	Rank	Boxer	Record	Weight class	Title(s)
—N/a	1	Floyd Mayweather Jr.	37–0 (24 KO)	Welterweight	WBC and The Ring
+1	2	Manny Pacquiao	43–3–2 (34 KO)	Super featherweight	—N/a
-1	3	Winky Wright	50–3–1 (25 KO)	Middleweight	—N/a
—N/a	4	Jermain Taylor	25–0–1 (17 KO)	Middleweight	WBA (Undisputed), WBC, WBO, and The Ring
—N/a	5	Bernard Hopkins	47–4–1–1 (32 KO)	Light heavyweight	The Ring
—N/a	6	Marco Antonio Barrera	63–4–0–1 (42 KO)	Super featherweight	WBC
—N/a	7	Rafael Márquez	36–3 (32 KO)	Bantamweight	IBF
—N/a	8	Ricky Hatton	41–0 (30 KO)	Light welterweight	The Ring
—N/a	9	José Luis Castillo	54–7–1 (47 KO)	Light welterweight	—N/a
—N/a	10	Joe Calzaghe	42–0 (31 KO)	Super middleweight	WBO and The Ring

June 26, 2006
Changes	Rank	Boxer	Record	Weight class	Title(s)
—N/a	1	Floyd Mayweather Jr.	36–0 (24 KO)	Welterweight	—N/a
—N/a	2	Winky Wright	50–3–1 (25 KO)	Middleweight	—N/a
—N/a	3	Manny Pacquiao	41–3–2 (32 KO)	Super featherweight	—N/a
New	4	Jermain Taylor	25–0–1 (17 KO)	Middleweight	WBA (Undisputed), WBC, WBO, and The Ring
-1	5	Bernard Hopkins	47–4–1–1 (32 KO)	Light heavyweight	The Ring
-1	6	Marco Antonio Barrera	62–4–0–1 (42 KO)	Super featherweight	WBC
-1	7	Rafael Márquez	35–3 (31 KO)	Bantamweight	IBF
-1	8	Ricky Hatton	41–0 (30 KO)	Light welterweight Welterweight	The Ring WBA
-1	9	José Luis Castillo	54–7–1 (47 KO)	Light welterweight	—N/a
-1	10	Joe Calzaghe	41–0 (31 KO)	Super middleweight	IBF, WBO, and The Ring

June 12, 2006
Changes	Rank	Boxer	Record	Weight class	Title(s)
—N/a	1	Floyd Mayweather Jr.	36–0 (24 KO)	Welterweight	—N/a
—N/a	2	Winky Wright	50–3–1 (25 KO)	Middleweight	—N/a
—N/a	3	Manny Pacquiao	41–3–2 (32 KO)	Super featherweight	—N/a
New	4	Bernard Hopkins	47–4–1–1 (32 KO)	Light heavyweight	The Ring
-1	5	Marco Antonio Barrera	62–4–0–1 (42 KO)	Super featherweight	WBC
-1	6	Rafael Márquez	35–3 (31 KO)	Bantamweight	IBF
-1	7	Ricky Hatton	41–0 (30 KO)	Light welterweight Welterweight	The Ring WBA
-1	8	José Luis Castillo	54–7–1 (47 KO)	Light welterweight	—N/a
—N/a	9	Joe Calzaghe	41–0 (31 KO)	Super middleweight	IBF, WBO, and The Ring
—N/a	10	Pongsaklek Wonjongkam	60–2 (32 KO)	Flyweight	WBC

May 15, 2006
Changes	Rank	Boxer	Record	Weight class	Title(s)
—N/a	1	Floyd Mayweather Jr.	36–0 (24 KO)	Welterweight	IBF
—N/a	2	Winky Wright	50–3 (25 KO)	Middleweight	—N/a
—N/a	3	Manny Pacquiao	41–3–2 (32 KO)	Super featherweight	—N/a
—N/a	4	Marco Antonio Barrera	61–4–0–1 (42 KO)	Super featherweight	WBC
+1	5	Rafael Márquez	35–3 (31 KO)	Bantamweight	IBF
-1	6	Ricky Hatton	41–0 (30 KO)	Light welterweight Welterweight	The Ring WBA
—N/a	7	José Luis Castillo	54–7–1 (47 KO)	Light welterweight	—N/a
—N/a	8	Antonio Tarver	24–3 (18 KO)	Light heavyweight	The Ring
—N/a	9	Joe Calzaghe	41–0 (31 KO)	Super middleweight	IBF, WBO, and The Ring
—N/a	10	Pongsaklek Wonjongkam	60–2 (32 KO)	Flyweight	WBC

March 7, 2006
Changes	Rank	Boxer	Record	Weight class	Title(s)
—N/a	1	Floyd Mayweather Jr.	35–0 (24 KO)	Light welterweight	WBC
—N/a	2	Winky Wright	50–3 (25 KO)	Middleweight	—N/a
—N/a	3	Manny Pacquiao	41–3–2 (32 KO)	Super featherweight	—N/a
—N/a	4	Marco Antonio Barrera	61–4–0–1 (42 KO)	Super featherweight	WBC and IBF
—N/a	5	Ricky Hatton	40–0 (30 KO)	Light welterweight	WBA (Unified), IBF, and The Ring
+1	6	Rafael Márquez	35–3 (31 KO)	Bantamweight	IBF
+1	7	José Luis Castillo	54–7–1 (47 KO)	Light welterweight	—N/a
+1	8	Antonio Tarver	24–3 (18 KO)	Light heavyweight	The Ring
New	9	Joe Calzaghe	41–0 (31 KO)	Super middleweight	IBF, WBO, and The Ring
—N/a	10	Pongsaklek Wonjongkam	60–2 (32 KO)	Flyweight	WBC

January 25, 2006
Changes	Rank	Boxer	Record	Weight class	Title(s)
—N/a	1	Floyd Mayweather Jr.	35–0 (24 KO)	Light welterweight	WBC
—N/a	2	Winky Wright	50–3 (25 KO)	Middleweight	—N/a
+2	3	Manny Pacquiao	41–3–2 (32 KO)	Super featherweight	—N/a
-1	4	Marco Antonio Barrera	61–4–0–1 (42 KO)	Super featherweight	WBC and IBF
-1	5	Ricky Hatton	40–0 (30 KO)	Light welterweight	WBA (Unified), IBF, and The Ring
+1	6	Juan Manuel Márquez	44–2–1 (33 KO)	Featherweight	—N/a
+1	7	Rafael Márquez	35–3 (31 KO)	Bantamweight	IBF
+1	8	José Luis Castillo	53–7–1 (47 KO)	Light welterweight	—N/a
+1	9	Antonio Tarver	24–3 (18 KO)	Light heavyweight	The Ring
New	10	Pongsaklek Wonjongkam	59–2 (32 KO)	Flyweight	WBC

January 12, 2006
Changes	Rank	Boxer	Record	Weight class	Title(s)
—N/a	1	Floyd Mayweather Jr.	35–0 (24 KO)	Light welterweight	WBC
—N/a	2	Winky Wright	50–3 (25 KO)	Middleweight	—N/a
—N/a	3	Marco Antonio Barrera	61–4–0–1 (42 KO)	Super featherweight	WBC and IBF
—N/a	4	Ricky Hatton	40–0 (30 KO)	Light welterweight	WBA (Unified), IBF, and The Ring
—N/a	5	Manny Pacquiao	40–3–2 (31 KO)	Super featherweight	—N/a
—N/a	6	Érik Morales	48–3 (34 KO)	Super featherweight	—N/a
—N/a	7	Juan Manuel Márquez	44–2–1 (33 KO)	Featherweight	—N/a
—N/a	8	Rafael Márquez	35–3 (31 KO)	Bantamweight	IBF
—N/a	9	José Luis Castillo	53–7–1 (47 KO)	Light welterweight	—N/a
New	10	Antonio Tarver	24–3 (18 KO)	Light heavyweight	The Ring

== 2005 ==
December 19, 2005
Changes	Rank	Boxer	Record	Weight class	Title(s)
—N/a	1	Floyd Mayweather Jr.	35–0 (24 KO)	Light welterweight	WBC
—N/a	2	Winky Wright	50–3 (25 KO)	Middleweight	—N/a
—N/a	3	Marco Antonio Barrera	61–4–0–1 (42 KO)	Super featherweight	WBC and IBF
+3	4	Ricky Hatton	40–0 (30 KO)	Light welterweight	WBA (Unified), IBF, and The Ring
-1	5	Manny Pacquiao	40–3–2 (32 KO)	Super featherweight	—N/a
—N/a	6	Érik Morales	48–3 (34 KO)	Super featherweight	—N/a
-2	7	Juan Manuel Márquez	44–2–1 (33 KO)	Featherweight	—N/a
New	8	Rafael Márquez	35–3 (31 KO)	Bantamweight	IBF
-1	9	José Luis Castillo	53–7–1 (47 KO)	Light welterweight	—N/a
New	10	Zab Judah	34–2–0–1 (25 KO)	Welterweight	WBA (Undisputed), WBC, IBF, and The Ring

October 12, 2005
Changes	Rank	Boxer	Record	Weight class	Title(s)
—N/a	1	Floyd Mayweather Jr.	34–0 (23 KO)	Light welterweight	WBC
—N/a	2	Winky Wright	49–3 (25 KO)	Middleweight	—N/a
—N/a	3	Marco Antonio Barrera	61–4–0–1 (42 KO)	Super featherweight	WBC and IBF
—N/a	4	Manny Pacquiao	40–3–2 (32 KO)	Super featherweight	—N/a
—N/a	5	Juan Manuel Márquez	44–2–1 (33 KO)	Featherweight	—N/a
—N/a	6	Érik Morales	48–3 (34 KO)	Super featherweight	—N/a
—N/a	7	Ricky Hatton	39–0 (29 KO)	Light welterweight	IBF and The Ring
New	8	José Luis Castillo	53–7–1 (47 KO)	Light welterweight	—N/a
—N/a	9	Jermain Taylor	24–0 (17 KO)	Middleweight	WBA (Undisputed), WBC, WBO, and The Ring
—N/a	10	Bernard Hopkins	46–3–1–1 (32 KO)	Middleweight	—N/a

October 5, 2005
Changes	Rank	Boxer	Record	Weight class	Title(s)
—N/a	1	Floyd Mayweather Jr.	34–0 (23 KO)	Light welterweight	WBC
—N/a	2	Winky Wright	49–3 (25 KO)	Middleweight	—N/a
—N/a	3	Marco Antonio Barrera	61–4–0–1 (42 KO)	Super featherweight	WBC and IBF
+1	4	Manny Pacquiao	40–3–2 (32 KO)	Super featherweight	—N/a
+1	5	Juan Manuel Márquez	44–2–1 (33 KO)	Featherweight	—N/a
-2	6	Érik Morales	48–3 (34 KO)	Super featherweight	—N/a
—N/a	7	Ricky Hatton	39–0 (29 KO)	Light welterweight	IBF and The Ring
—N/a	8	Diego Corrales	40–2 (33 KO)	Lightweight	WBC, WBO, and The Ring
—N/a	9	Jermain Taylor	24–0 (17 KO)	Middleweight	WBA (Undisputed), WBC, WBO, and The Ring
—N/a	10	Bernard Hopkins	46–3–1–1 (32 KO)	Middleweight	—N/a

July 18, 2005
Changes	Rank	Boxer	Record	Weight class	Title(s)
+1	1	Floyd Mayweather Jr.	34–0 (23 KO)	Light welterweight	WBC
+1	2	Winky Wright	49–3 (25 KO)	Light middleweight	The Ring
+1	3	Marco Antonio Barrera	60–4–0–1 (42 KO)	Super featherweight	WBC
+1	4	Érik Morales	48–2 (34 KO)	Super featherweight	—N/a
+1	5	Manny Pacquiao	39–3–2 (31 KO)	Super featherweight	—N/a
+1	6	Juan Manuel Márquez	44–2–1 (33 KO)	Featherweight	WBA (Unified) and IBF
+1	7	Ricky Hatton	39–0 (29 KO)	Light welterweight	IBF and The Ring
+1	8	Diego Corrales	40–2 (33 KO)	Lightweight	WBC, WBO, and The Ring
New	9	Jermain Taylor	24–0 (17 KO)	Middleweight	WBA (Undisputed), WBC, IBF, WBO, and The Ring
-9	10	Bernard Hopkins	46–3–1–1 (32 KO)	Middleweight	—N/a

July 8, 2005
Changes	Rank	Boxer	Record	Weight class	Title(s)
—N/a	1	Bernard Hopkins	46–2–1–1 (32 KO)	Middleweight	WBA (Undisputed), WBC, IBF, WBO, and The Ring
—N/a	2	Floyd Mayweather Jr.	34–0 (23 KO)	Light welterweight	WBC
—N/a	3	Winky Wright	49–3 (25 KO)	Light middleweight	The Ring
—N/a	4	Marco Antonio Barrera	60–4–0–1 (42 KO)	Super featherweight	WBC
—N/a	5	Érik Morales	48–2 (34 KO)	Super featherweight	—N/a
—N/a	6	Manny Pacquiao	39–3–2 (31 KO)	Super featherweight	—N/a
—N/a	7	Juan Manuel Márquez	44–2–1 (33 KO)	Featherweight	WBA (Unified) and IBF
—N/a	8	Ricky Hatton	39–0 (29 KO)	Light welterweight	IBF and The Ring
—N/a	9	Diego Corrales	40–2 (33 KO)	Lightweight	WBC, WBO, and The Ring
New	10	Antonio Tarver	23–3 (18 KO)	Light heavyweight	The Ring

June 7, 2005
Changes	Rank	Boxer	Record	Weight class	Title(s)
—N/a	1	Bernard Hopkins	46–2–1–1 (32 KO)	Middleweight	WBA (Undisputed), WBC, IBF, WBO, and The Ring
—N/a	2	Floyd Mayweather Jr.	33–0 (22 KO)	Light welterweight	—N/a
+1	3	Winky Wright	49–3 (25 KO)	Light middleweight	The Ring
+1	4	Marco Antonio Barrera	60–4–0–1 (42 KO)	Super featherweight	WBC
+1	5	Érik Morales	48–2 (34 KO)	Super featherweight	—N/a
+1	6	Manny Pacquiao	39–3–2 (31 KO)	Super featherweight	—N/a
+1	7	Juan Manuel Márquez	44–2–1 (33 KO)	Featherweight	WBA (Unified) and IBF
New	8	Ricky Hatton	39–0 (29 KO)	Light welterweight	IBF and The Ring
—N/a	9	Diego Corrales	40–2 (33 KO)	Lightweight	WBC, WBO, and The Ring
—N/a	10	Glen Johnson	42–9–2 (28 KO)	Light heavyweight	The Ring

May 9, 2005
Changes	Rank	Boxer	Record	Weight class	Title(s)
—N/a	1	Bernard Hopkins	46–2–1–1 (32 KO)	Middleweight	WBA (Undisputed), WBC, IBF, WBO, and The Ring
—N/a	2	Floyd Mayweather Jr.	33–0 (22 KO)	Light welterweight	—N/a
—N/a	3	Kostya Tszyu	31–1–0–1 (25 KO)	Light welterweight	IBF and The Ring
—N/a	4	Winky Wright	48–3 (25 KO)	Light middleweight	The Ring
—N/a	5	Marco Antonio Barrera	60–4–0–1 (42 KO)	Super featherweight	WBC
—N/a	6	Érik Morales	48–2 (34 KO)	Super featherweight	—N/a
—N/a	7	Manny Pacquiao	39–3–2 (31 KO)	Featherweight	The Ring
—N/a	8	Juan Manuel Márquez	44–2–1 (33 KO)	Featherweight	WBA (Unified) and IBF
New	9	Diego Corrales	40–2 (33 KO)	Lightweight	WBC, WBO, and The Ring
—N/a	10	Glen Johnson	42–9–2 (28 KO)	Light heavyweight	The Ring

March 23, 2005
Changes	Rank	Boxer	Record	Weight class	Title(s)
—N/a	1	Bernard Hopkins	46–2–1–1 (32 KO)	Middleweight	WBA (Undisputed), WBC, IBF, WBO, and The Ring
—N/a	2	Floyd Mayweather Jr.	33–0 (22 KO)	Light welterweight	—N/a
—N/a	3	Kostya Tszyu	31–1–0–1 (25 KO)	Light welterweight	IBF and The Ring
—N/a	4	Winky Wright	48–3 (25 KO)	Light middleweight	The Ring
+2	5	Marco Antonio Barrera	59–4–0–1 (41 KO)	Super featherweight	WBC
+2	6	Érik Morales	48–2 (34 KO)	Super featherweight	—N/a
-2	7	Manny Pacquiao	39–3–2 (31 KO)	Featherweight	The Ring
-2	8	Juan Manuel Márquez	43–2–1 (33 KO)	Featherweight	WBA (Unified) and IBF
—N/a	9	Jose Luis Castillo	52–6–1 (46 KO)	Lightweight	WBC and The Ring
—N/a	10	Glen Johnson	42–9–2 (28 KO)	Light heavyweight	The Ring

March 8, 2005
Changes	Rank	Boxer	Record	Weight class	Title(s)
—N/a	1	Bernard Hopkins	46–2–1–1 (32 KO)	Middleweight	WBA (Undisputed), WBC, IBF, WBO, and The Ring
—N/a	2	Floyd Mayweather Jr.	33–0 (22 KO)	Light welterweight	—N/a
—N/a	3	Kostya Tszyu	31–1–0–1 (25 KO)	Light welterweight	IBF and The Ring
—N/a	4	Winky Wright	48–3 (25 KO)	Light middleweight	WBA (Unified) and The Ring
—N/a	5	Manny Pacquiao	39–2–2 (31 KO)	Featherweight	The Ring
—N/a	6	Juan Manuel Márquez	43–2–1 (33 KO)	Featherweight	WBA (Unified) and IBF
—N/a	7	Marco Antonio Barrera	59–4–0–1 (41 KO)	Super featherweight	WBC
—N/a	8	Érik Morales	47–2 (34 KO)	Super featherweight	—N/a
New	9	Jose Luis Castillo	52–6–1 (46 KO)	Lightweight	WBC and The Ring
-1	10	Glen Johnson	42–9–2 (28 KO)	Light heavyweight	The Ring

== 2004 ==
December 20, 2004
Changes	Rank	Boxer	Record	Weight class	Title(s)
—N/a	1	Bernard Hopkins	45–2–1–1 (32 KO)	Middleweight	WBA (Undisputed), WBC, IBF, WBO, and The Ring
—N/a	2	Floyd Mayweather Jr.	32–0 (21 KO)	Light welterweight	—N/a
+1	3	Kostya Tszyu	31–1–0–1 (25 KO)	Light welterweight	IBF and The Ring
+1	4	Winky Wright	48–3 (25 KO)	Light middleweight	WBA (Unified), WBC, and The Ring
+1	5	Manny Pacquiao	39–2–2 (31 KO)	Featherweight	The Ring
+1	6	Juan Manuel Márquez	43–2–1 (33 KO)	Featherweight	WBA (Unified) and IBF
+1	7	Marco Antonio Barrera	59–4–0–1 (41 KO)	Super featherweight	WBC
+1	8	Érik Morales	47–2 (34 KO)	Super featherweight	—N/a
New	9	Glen Johnson	42–9–2 (28 KO)	Light heavyweight	The Ring
-7	10	Antonio Tarver	22–3 (18 KO)	Light heavyweight	—N/a

November 29, 2004
Changes	Rank	Boxer	Record	Weight class	Title(s)
—N/a	1	Bernard Hopkins	45–2–1–1 (32 KO)	Middleweight	WBA (Undisputed), WBC, IBF, WBO, and The Ring
—N/a	2	Floyd Mayweather Jr.	32–0 (21 KO)	Light welterweight	—N/a
—N/a	3	Antonio Tarver	22–2 (18 KO)	Light heavyweight	The Ring
+2	4	Kostya Tszyu	31–1–0–1 (25 KO)	Light welterweight	IBF and The Ring
-1	5	Winky Wright	48–3 (25 KO)	Light middleweight	WBA (Unified), WBC, and The Ring
+1	6	Manny Pacquiao	38–2–2 (31 KO)	Featherweight	The Ring
+1	7	Juan Manuel Márquez	43–2–1 (33 KO)	Featherweight	WBA (Unified) and IBF
New	8	Marco Antonio Barrera	59–4–0–1 (41 KO)	Super featherweight	WBC
-4	9	Érik Morales	47–2 (34 KO)	Super featherweight	—N/a
-1	10	James Toney	68–4–2 (43 KO)	Heavyweight	—N/a

November 9, 2004
Changes	Rank	Boxer	Record	Weight class	Title(s)
—N/a	1	Bernard Hopkins	45–2–1–1 (32 KO)	Middleweight	WBA (Undisputed), WBC, IBF, WBO, and The Ring
—N/a	2	Floyd Mayweather Jr.	32–0 (21 KO)	Light welterweight	—N/a
—N/a	3	Antonio Tarver	22–2 (18 KO)	Light heavyweight	The Ring
—N/a	4	Winky Wright	47–3 (25 KO)	Light middleweight	WBA (Unified), WBC, and The Ring
—N/a	5	Érik Morales	47–1 (34 KO)	Super featherweight	WBC
+2	6	Kostya Tszyu	31–1–0–1 (25 KO)	Light welterweight	IBF and The Ring
-1	7	Manny Pacquiao	38–2–2 (31 KO)	Featherweight	The Ring
-1	8	Juan Manuel Márquez	43–2–1 (33 KO)	Featherweight	WBA (Unified) and IBF
—N/a	9	James Toney	68–4–2 (43 KO)	Heavyweight	—N/a
—N/a	10	Jose Luis Castillo	50–6–1 (45 KO)	Lightweight	WBC and The Ring

October 31, 2004
Changes	Rank	Boxer	Record	Weight class	Title(s)
—N/a	1	Bernard Hopkins	45–2–1–1 (32 KO)	Middleweight	WBA (Undisputed), WBC, IBF, WBO, and The Ring
—N/a	2	Floyd Mayweather Jr.	32–0 (21 KO)	Light welterweight	—N/a
—N/a	3	Antonio Tarver	22–2 (18 KO)	Light heavyweight	The Ring
+1	4	Winky Wright	47–3 (25 KO)	Light middleweight	WBA (Unified), WBC, and The Ring
+1	5	Érik Morales	47–1 (34 KO)	Super featherweight	WBC
+1	6	Manny Pacquiao	38–2–2 (31 KO)	Featherweight	The Ring
+1	7	Juan Manuel Márquez	43–2–1 (33 KO)	Featherweight	WBA (Unified) and IBF
+2	8	Kostya Tszyu	30–1–0–1 (25 KO)	Light welterweight	IBF and The Ring
New	9	James Toney	68–4–2 (43 KO)	Heavyweight	—N/a
New	10	Jose Luis Castillo	50–6–1 (45 KO)	Lightweight	WBC and The Ring

June 8, 2004
Changes	Rank	Boxer	Record	Weight class	Title(s)
+1	1	Bernard Hopkins	44–2–1–1 (31 KO)	Middleweight	WBA (Undisputed), WBC, IBF, and The Ring
+1	2	Floyd Mayweather Jr.	32–0 (21 KO)	Light welterweight	—N/a
+7	3	Antonio Tarver	22–2 (18 KO)	Light heavyweight	WBA (Unified), WBC, and The Ring
-3	4	Roy Jones Jr.	49–2 (38 KO)	Light heavyweight	—N/a
+1	5	Winky Wright	47–3 (25 KO)	Light middleweight	WBA (Unified), WBC, and The Ring
+1	6	Érik Morales	47–1 (34 KO)	Super featherweight	WBC and IBF
-2	7	Manny Pacquiao	38–2–2 (31 KO)	Featherweight	The Ring
New	8	Juan Manuel Márquez	42–2–1 (33 KO)	Featherweight	WBA (Unified) and IBF
-5	9	Oscar De La Hoya	37–3 (29 KO)	Middleweight	WBO
-2	10	Kostya Tszyu	30–1–0–1 (24 KO)	Light welterweight	IBF and The Ring

March 19, 2004
Changes	Rank	Boxer	Record	Weight class	Title(s)
—N/a	1	Roy Jones Jr.	49–1 (38 KO)	Light heavyweight	WBA (Unified), WBC, and The Ring
—N/a	2	Bernard Hopkins	43–2–1–1 (31 KO)	Middleweight	WBA (Undisputed), WBC, IBF, and The Ring
+2	3	Floyd Mayweather Jr.	31–0 (21 KO)	Lightweight	WBC and The Ring
—N/a	4	Oscar De La Hoya	36–3 (29 KO)	Light middleweight	—N/a
+1	5	Manny Pacquiao	38–2–1 (29 KO)	Featherweight	The Ring
New	6	Winky Wright	47–3 (25 KO)	Light middleweight	WBA (Unified), WBC, IBF, and The Ring
—N/a	7	Érik Morales	46–1 (34 KO)	Super featherweight	WBC
—N/a	8	Kostya Tszyu	30–1–0–1 (24 KO)	Light welterweight	IBF and The Ring
—N/a	9	James Toney	67–4–2 (43 KO)	Heavyweight	—N/a
—N/a	10	Antonio Tarver	21–2 (17 KO)	Light heavyweight	—N/a

March 3, 2004
Changes	Rank	Boxer	Record	Weight class	Title(s)
—N/a	1	Roy Jones Jr.	49–1 (38 KO)	Light heavyweight	WBA (Unified), WBC, and The Ring
—N/a	2	Bernard Hopkins	43–2–1–1 (31 KO)	Middleweight	WBA (Undisputed), WBC, IBF, and The Ring
—N/a	3	Shane Mosley	40–2 (25 KO)	Light middleweight	WBA (Unified), WBC, and The Ring
—N/a	4	Oscar De La Hoya	36–3 (29 KO)	Light middleweight	—N/a
—N/a	5	Floyd Mayweather Jr.	31–0 (21 KO)	Lightweight	WBC and The Ring
—N/a	6	Manny Pacquiao	38–2–1 (29 KO)	Featherweight	The Ring
+1	7	Érik Morales	46–1 (34 KO)	Super featherweight	WBC
-1	8	Kostya Tszyu	30–1–0–1 (24 KO)	Light welterweight	IBF and The Ring
—N/a	9	James Toney	67–4–2 (43 KO)	Heavyweight	—N/a
—N/a	10	Antonio Tarver	21–2 (17 KO)	Light heavyweight	—N/a

January 14, 2004
Changes	Rank	Boxer	Record	Weight class	Title(s)
—N/a	1	Roy Jones Jr.	49–1 (38 KO)	Light heavyweight Heavyweight	WBC, IBF, and The Ring WBA
—N/a	2	Bernard Hopkins	43–2–1–1 (31 KO)	Middleweight	WBA (Undisputed), WBC, IBF, and The Ring
—N/a	3	Shane Mosley	39–2–0–1 (35 KO)	Light middleweight	WBA (Unified), WBC, and The Ring
—N/a	4	Oscar De La Hoya	36–3 (29 KO)	Light middleweight	—N/a
—N/a	5	Floyd Mayweather Jr.	31–0 (21 KO)	Lightweight	WBC and The Ring
—N/a	6	Manny Pacquiao	38–2–1 (29 KO)	Featherweight	The Ring
—N/a	7	Kostya Tszyu	30–1–0–1 (23 KO)	Light welterweight	WBA (Unified), WBC, IBF, and The Ring
—N/a	8	Erik Morales	45–1 (31 KO)	Super featherweight	—N/a
+1	9	James Toney	67–4–2 (53 KO)	Cruiserweight Heavyweight	IBF —
New	10	Antonio Tarver	21–2 (17 KO)	Light heavyweight	—N/a

== 2003 ==
December 3, 2003
Changes	Rank	Boxer	Record	Weight class	Title(s)
—N/a	1	Roy Jones Jr.	49–1 (38 KO)	Light heavyweight Heavyweight	WBC, IBF, and The Ring WBA
—N/a	2	Bernard Hopkins	42–2–1–1 (31 KO)	Middleweight	WBA (Undisputed), WBC, IBF, and The Ring
+1	3	Shane Mosley	39–2–0–1 (35 KO)	Light middleweight	WBA (Unified), WBC, and The Ring
+1	4	Oscar De La Hoya	36–3 (29 KO)	Light middleweight	—N/a
+1	5	Floyd Mayweather Jr.	31–0 (21 KO)	Lightweight	WBC and The Ring
New	6	Manny Pacquiao	38–2–1 (29 KO)	Featherweight	The Ring
—N/a	7	Kostya Tszyu	30–1–0–1 (23 KO)	Light welterweight	WBA (Unified), WBC, IBF, and The Ring
—N/a	8	Erik Morales	45–1 (31 KO)	Super featherweight	—N/a
—N/a	9	Ricardo Mayorga	25–3–1 (22 KO)	Welterweight	WBA (Unified), WBC, and The Ring
—N/a	10	James Toney	67–4–2 (53 KO)	Cruiserweight Heavyweight	IBF —

November 6, 2003
Changes	Rank	Boxer	Record	Weight class	Title(s)
—N/a	1	Roy Jones Jr.	48–1 (38 KO)	Light heavyweight Heavyweight	WBC, IBF, and The Ring WBA
—N/a	2	Bernard Hopkins	42–2–1–1 (31 KO)	Middleweight	WBA (Undisputed), WBC, IBF, and The Ring
—N/a	3	Marco Antonio Barrera	57–3–0–1 (40 KO)	Featherweight	The Ring
—N/a	4	Shane Mosley	39–2–0–1 (35 KO)	Light middleweight	WBA (Unified), WBC, and The Ring
—N/a	5	Oscar De La Hoya	36–3 (29 KO)	Light middleweight	—N/a
+2	6	Floyd Mayweather Jr.	31–0 (21 KO)	Lightweight	WBC and The Ring
-1	7	Kostya Tszyu	30–1–0–1 (23 KO)	Light welterweight	WBA (Unified), WBC, IBF, and The Ring
-1	8	Erik Morales	45–1 (31 KO)	Super featherweight	—N/a
—N/a	9	Ricardo Mayorga	25–3–1 (22 KO)	Welterweight	WBA (Unified), WBC, and The Ring
New	10	James Toney	67–4–2 (53 KO)	Cruiserweight Heavyweight	IBF —

October 7, 2003
Changes	Rank	Boxer	Record	Weight class	Title(s)
—N/a	1	Roy Jones Jr.	48–1 (38 KO)	Light heavyweight Heavyweight	WBC, IBF, and The Ring WBA
—N/a	2	Bernard Hopkins	42–2–1–1 (31 KO)	Middleweight	WBA (Undisputed), WBC, IBF, and The Ring
—N/a	3	Marco Antonio Barrera	57–3–0–1 (40 KO)	Featherweight	The Ring
—N/a	4	Shane Mosley	39–2–0–1 (35 KO)	Light middleweight	WBA (Unified), WBC, and The Ring
—N/a	5	Oscar De La Hoya	36–3 (29 KO)	Light middleweight	—N/a
—N/a	6	Kostya Tszyu	30–1–0–1 (23 KO)	Light welterweight	WBA (Unified), WBC, IBF, and The Ring
—N/a	7	Erik Morales	45–1 (31 KO)	Super featherweight	—N/a
—N/a	8	Floyd Mayweather Jr.	30–0 (20 KO)	Lightweight	WBC and The Ring
—N/a	9	Ricardo Mayorga	25–3–1 (22 KO)	Welterweight	WBA (Unified), WBC, and The Ring
New	10	James Toney	67–4–2 (53 KO)	Cruiserweight Heavyweight	IBF —

September 15, 2003
Changes	Rank	Boxer	Record	Weight class	Title(s)
—N/a	1	Roy Jones Jr.	48–1 (38 KO)	Light heavyweight Heavyweight	WBC, IBF, and The Ring WBA
—N/a	2	Bernard Hopkins	42–2–1–1 (31 KO)	Middleweight	WBA (Unified), WBC, IBF, and The Ring
—N/a	3	Marco Antonio Barrera	57–3–0–1 (40 KO)	Featherweight	The Ring
+6	4	Shane Mosley	39–2–0–1 (35 KO)	Light middleweight	WBA (Unified), WBC, and The Ring
-1	5	Oscar De La Hoya	36–3 (29 KO)	Light middleweight	—N/a
-1	6	Kostya Tszyu	30–1–0–1 (23 KO)	Light welterweight	WBA (Unified), WBC, IBF, and The Ring
-1	7	Erik Morales	44–1 (30 KO)	Featherweight	WBC
-1	8	Floyd Mayweather Jr.	30–0 (20 KO)	Lightweight	WBC and The Ring
-1	9	Ricardo Mayorga	25–3–1 (22 KO)	Welterweight	WBA (Unified), WBC, and The Ring
-1	10	Vernon Forrest	35–2–0–1 (26 KO)	Welterweight	—N/a

July 2, 2003
Changes	Rank	Boxer	Record	Weight class	Title(s)
—N/a	1	Roy Jones Jr.	48–1 (38 KO)	Light heavyweight Heavyweight	WBC, IBF, and The Ring WBA
—N/a	2	Bernard Hopkins	42–2–1–1 (31 KO)	Middleweight	WBA (Unified), WBC, IBF, and The Ring
—N/a	3	Marco Antonio Barrera	57–3–0–1 (40 KO)	Featherweight	The Ring
—N/a	4	Oscar De La Hoya	36–2 (29 KO)	Light middleweight	WBA (Unified), WBC, and The Ring
—N/a	5	Kostya Tszyu	30–1–0–1 (23 KO)	Light welterweight	WBA (Unified), WBC, IBF, and The Ring
—N/a	6	Erik Morales	44–1 (30 KO)	Featherweight	WBC
—N/a	7	Floyd Mayweather Jr.	30–0 (20 KO)	Lightweight	WBC and The Ring
—N/a	8	Ricardo Mayorga	24–3–1 (22 KO)	Welterweight	WBA (Unified), WBC, and The Ring
+1	9	Vernon Forrest	35–1–0–1 (26 KO)	Welterweight	—N/a
New	10	Shane Mosley	38–2–0–1 (35 KO)	Light middleweight	—N/a

March 11, 2003
Changes	Rank	Boxer	Record	Weight class	Title(s)
+1	1	Roy Jones Jr.	48–1 (38 KO)	Light heavyweight Heavyweight	WBA (Unified), WBC, IBF, and The Ring WBA
-1	2	Bernard Hopkins	41–2–1–1 (30 KO)	Middleweight	WBA (Unified), WBC, IBF, and The Ring
—N/a	3	Marco Antonio Barrera	56–3–0–1 (39 KO)	Featherweight	The Ring
—N/a	4	Oscar De La Hoya	35–2 (28 KO)	Light middleweight	WBA (Unified), WBC, and The Ring
—N/a	5	Kostya Tszyu	30–1–0–1 (23 KO)	Light welterweight	WBA (Unified), WBC, IBF, and The Ring
—N/a	6	Erik Morales	43–1 (29 KO)	Featherweight	WBC
—N/a	7	Floyd Mayweather Jr.	29–0 (20 KO)	Lightweight	WBC and The Ring
—N/a	8	Ricardo Mayorga	24–3–1 (22 KO)	Welterweight	WBA (Unified), WBC, and The Ring
—N/a	9	Lennox Lewis	40–2–1 (31 KO)	Heavyweight	WBC and The Ring
—N/a	10	Vernon Forrest	35–1–0–1 (26 KO)	Welterweight	—N/a

February 11, 2003
Changes	Rank	Boxer	Record	Weight class	Title(s)
—N/a	1	Bernard Hopkins	41–2–1–1 (30 KO)	Middleweight	WBA (Unified), WBC, IBF, and The Ring
—N/a	2	Roy Jones Jr.	47–1 (38 KO)	Light heavyweight	WBA (Unified), WBC, IBF, and The Ring
—N/a	3	Marco Antonio Barrera	56–3–0–1 (39 KO)	Featherweight	The Ring
+1	4	Oscar De La Hoya	35–2 (28 KO)	Light middleweight	WBA (Unified), WBC, and The Ring
+1	5	Kostya Tszyu	30–1–0–1 (23 KO)	Light welterweight	WBA (Unified), WBC, IBF, and The Ring
+1	6	Erik Morales	42–1 (28 KO)	Featherweight	WBC
+1	7	Floyd Mayweather Jr.	29–0 (20 KO)	Lightweight	WBC and The Ring
New	8	Ricardo Mayorga	24–3–1 (22 KO)	Welterweight	WBA (Unified), WBC, and The Ring
-1	9	Lennox Lewis	40–2–1 (31 KO)	Heavyweight	WBC and The Ring
-6	10	Vernon Forrest	35–1–0–1 (26 KO)	Welterweight	—N/a

== 2002 ==
December 1, 2002
Changes	Rank	Boxer	Record	Weight class	Title(s)
—N/a	1	Bernard Hopkins	41–2–1–1 (30 KO)	Middleweight	WBA (Unified), WBC, IBF, and The Ring
—N/a	2	Roy Jones Jr.	47–1 (38 KO)	Light heavyweight	WBA (Unified), WBC, IBF, and The Ring
—N/a	3	Marco Antonio Barrera	56–3–0–1 (39 KO)	Featherweight	The Ring
—N/a	4	Vernon Forrest	35–0–0–1 (26 KO)	Welterweight	WBC and The Ring
—N/a	5	Oscar De La Hoya	35–2 (28 KO)	Light middleweight	WBA (Unified), WBC, and The Ring
—N/a	6	Kostya Tszyu	29–1–0–1 (22 KO)	Light welterweight	WBA (Unified), WBC, IBF, and The Ring
+2	7	Erik Morales	42–1 (28 KO)	Featherweight	WBC
-1	8	Floyd Mayweather Jr.	28–0 (20 KO)	Lightweight	WBC and The Ring
-1	9	Lennox Lewis	40–2–1 (31 KO)	Heavyweight	WBC and The Ring
—N/a	10	Shane Mosley	38–2 (35 KO)	Welterweight	—N/a

September 15, 2002
Changes	Rank	Boxer	Record	Weight class	Title(s)
—N/a	1	Bernard Hopkins	41–2–1–1 (30 KO)	Middleweight	WBA (Unified), WBC, IBF, and The Ring
—N/a	2	Roy Jones Jr.	47–1 (38 KO)	Light heavyweight	WBA (Unified), WBC, IBF, and The Ring
—N/a	3	Marco Antonio Barrera	55–3–0–1 (39 KO)	Featherweight	The Ring
—N/a	4	Vernon Forrest	35–0–0–1 (26 KO)	Welterweight	WBC and The Ring
+5	5	Oscar De La Hoya	35–2 (28 KO)	Light middleweight	WBA (Unified), WBC, and The Ring
-1	6	Kostya Tszyu	29–1–0–1 (22 KO)	Light welterweight	WBA (Unified), WBC, IBF, and The Ring
-1	7	Floyd Mayweather Jr.	28–0 (20 KO)	Lightweight	WBC and The Ring
-1	8	Lennox Lewis	40–2–1 (31 KO)	Heavyweight	WBC and The Ring
-1	9	Erik Morales	41–1 (28 KO)	Featherweight	—N/a
-1	10	Shane Mosley	38–2 (35 KO)	Welterweight	—N/a

August 11, 2002
Changes	Rank	Boxer	Record	Weight class	Title(s)
—N/a	1	Bernard Hopkins	41–2–1–1 (30 KO)	Middleweight	WBA (Unified), WBC, IBF, and The Ring
—N/a	2	Roy Jones Jr.	46–1 (37 KO)	Light heavyweight	WBA (Super), WBC, IBF, and The Ring
—N/a	3	Marco Antonio Barrera	55–3–0–1 (39 KO)	Featherweight	The Ring
—N/a	4	Vernon Forrest	35–0–0–1 (26 KO)	Welterweight	WBC and The Ring
+3	5	Kostya Tszyu	29–1–0–1 (22 KO)	Light welterweight	WBA (Unified), WBC, IBF, and The Ring
+1	6	Floyd Mayweather Jr.	28–0 (20 KO)	Lightweight	WBC and The Ring
+3	7	Lennox Lewis	40–2–1 (31 KO)	Heavyweight	WBC, IBF, and The Ring
New	8	Erik Morales	41–1 (28 KO)	Featherweight	—N/a
-1	9	Shane Mosley	38–2 (35 KO)	Welterweight	—N/a
-1	10	Oscar De La Hoya	34–2 (27 KO)	Light middleweight	WBC

May 19, 2002
Changes	Rank	Boxer	Record	Weight class	Title(s)
—N/a	1	Bernard Hopkins	41–2–1–1 (30 KO)	Middleweight	WBA (Super), WBC, IBF, and The Ring
—N/a	2	Roy Jones Jr.	46–1 (37 KO)	Light heavyweight	WBA (Super), WBC, IBF, and The Ring
—N/a	3	Marco Antonio Barrera	54–3–0–1 (39 KO)	Featherweight	—N/a
+1	4	Vernon Forrest	34–0–0–1 (26 KO)	Welterweight	WBC and The Ring
+1	5	Felix Trinidad	41–1 (34 KO)	Middleweight	—N/a
+1	6	Shane Mosley	38–1 (35 KO)	Welterweight	—N/a
-3	7	Floyd Mayweather Jr.	28–0 (20 KO)	Lightweight	WBC and The Ring
+2	8	Kostya Tszyu	29–1–0–1 (22 KO)	Light welterweight	WBA (Super), WBC, IBF, and The Ring
-1	9	Oscar De La Hoya	34–2 (27 KO)	Light middleweight	WBC
-1	10	Ricardo López	51–0–1 (38 KO)	Light flyweight	IBF

January 27, 2002
Changes	Rank	Boxer	Record	Weight class	Title(s)
+1	1	Bernard Hopkins	40–2–1–1 (29 KO)	Middleweight	WBA (Super), WBC, IBF, and The Ring
+1	2	Roy Jones Jr.	46–1 (37 KO)	Light heavyweight	WBA (Super), WBC, IBF, and The Ring
+1	3	Marco Antonio Barrera	54–3–0–1 (39 KO)	Featherweight	—N/a
+1	4	Floyd Mayweather Jr.	27–0 (20 KO)	Super featherweight	WBC
New	5	Vernon Forrest	34–0–0–1 (26 KO)	Welterweight	WBC and The Ring
—N/a	6	Felix Trinidad	40–1 (33 KO)	Middleweight	—N/a
-6	7	Shane Mosley	38–1 (35 KO)	Welterweight	—N/a
-1	8	Oscar De La Hoya	34–2 (27 KO)	Light middleweight	WBC
-1	9	Ricardo López	51–0–1 (38 KO)	Light flyweight	IBF
-1	10	Kostya Tszyu	28–1–0–1 (22 KO)	Light welterweight	WBA (Super), WBC, IBF, and The Ring

== 2001 ==
November 11, 2001
Changes	Rank	Boxer	Record	Weight class	Title(s)
—N/a	1	Shane Mosley	38–0 (35 KO)	Welterweight	WBC
+5	2	Bernard Hopkins	40–2–1–1 (29 KO)	Middleweight	WBA (Super), WBC, and IBF
—N/a	3	Roy Jones Jr.	45–1 (36 KO)	Light heavyweight	WBA (Super), WBC, and IBF
—N/a	4	Marco Antonio Barrera	54–3–0–1 (39 KO)	Featherweight	—N/a
—N/a	5	Floyd Mayweather Jr.	27–0 (20 KO)	Super featherweight	WBC
-4	6	Felix Trinidad	40–1 (33 KO)	Middleweight	—N/a
-1	7	Oscar De La Hoya	34–2 (27 KO)	Light middleweight	WBC
+1	8	Ricardo López	50–0–1 (37 KO)	Light flyweight	IBF
New	9	Kostya Tszyu	28–1–0–1 (22 KO)	Light welterweight	WBA (Super), WBC, and IBF
-1	10	Erik Morales	41–0 (28 KO)	Featherweight	WBC

October 14, 2001
Changes	Rank	Boxer	Record	Weight class	Title(s)
—N/a	1	Shane Mosley	38–0 (35 KO)	Welterweight	WBC
+5	2	Bernard Hopkins	40–2–1–1 (29 KO)	Middleweight	WBA (Super), WBC, and IBF
—N/a	3	Roy Jones Jr.	45–1 (36 KO)	Light heavyweight	WBA (Super), WBC, and IBF
—N/a	4	Marco Antonio Barrera	54–3–0–1 (39 KO)	Featherweight	—N/a
—N/a	5	Floyd Mayweather Jr.	26–0 (19 KO)	Super featherweight	WBC
-4	6	Felix Trinidad	40–1 (33 KO)	Middleweight	—N/a
-1	7	Oscar De La Hoya	34–2 (27 KO)	Light middleweight	WBC
+1	8	Ricardo López	51–0–1 (38 KO)	Light flyweight	IBF
+1	9	Erik Morales	41–0 (28 KO)	Featherweight	WBC
New	10	Tim Austin	23–0–1 (21 KO)	Bantamweight	IBF

September 10, 2001
Changes	Rank	Boxer	Record	Weight class	Title(s)
—N/a	1	Shane Mosley	38–0 (35 KO)	Welterweight	WBC
—N/a	2	Felix Trinidad	40–0 (33 KO)	Middleweight	WBA
+1	3	Roy Jones Jr.	45–1 (36 KO)	Light heavyweight	WBA (Super), WBC, and IBF
+1	4	Marco Antonio Barrera	54–3–0–1 (39 KO)	Featherweight	—N/a
-1	5	Floyd Mayweather Jr.	27–0 (20 KO)	Super featherweight	WBC
—N/a	6	Oscar De La Hoya	34–2 (27 KO)	Light middleweight	WBC
—N/a	7	Bernard Hopkins	39–2–1–1 (28 KO)	Middleweight	WBC and IBF
—N/a	8	Naseem Hamed	35–1 (31 KO)	Featherweight	—N/a
—N/a	9	Ricardo López	50–0–1 (37 KO)	Light flyweight	IBF
—N/a	10	Erik Morales	41–0 (28 KO)	Featherweight	WBC

May 7, 2001
Changes	Rank	Boxer	Record	Weight class	Title(s)
—N/a	1	Shane Mosley	37–0 (34 KO)	Welterweight	WBC
—N/a	2	Felix Trinidad	39–0 (32 KO)	Light middleweight	WBA and IBF
—N/a	3	Floyd Mayweather Jr.	25–0 (19 KO)	Super featherweight	WBC
—N/a	4	Roy Jones Jr.	44–1 (36 KO)	Light heavyweight	WBA (Super), WBC, and IBF
—N/a	5	Marco Antonio Barrera	53–3–0–1 (38 KO)	Super bantamweight Featherweight	WBO —
—N/a	6	Oscar De La Hoya	33–2 (27 KO)	Welterweight	—N/a
+1	7	Bernard Hopkins	39–2–1–1 (28 KO)	Middleweight	WBC and IBF
+1	8	Naseem Hamed	35–1 (31 KO)	Featherweight	—N/a
+1	9	Ricardo López	50–0–1 (37 KO)	Light flyweight	IBF
New	10	Erik Morales	40–0 (28 KO)	Featherweight	WBC

April 8, 2001
Changes	Rank	Boxer	Record	Weight class	Title(s)
—N/a	1	Shane Mosley	37–0 (34 KO)	Welterweight	WBC
—N/a	2	Felix Trinidad	39–0 (32 KO)	Light middleweight	WBA and IBF
—N/a	3	Floyd Mayweather Jr.	25–0 (19 KO)	Super featherweight	WBC
—N/a	4	Roy Jones Jr.	44–1 (36 KO)	Light heavyweight	WBA (Super), WBC, and IBF
+4	5	Marco Antonio Barrera	53–3–0–1 (38 KO)	Super bantamweight Featherweight	WBO —
-1	6	Oscar De La Hoya	33–2 (27 KO)	Welterweight	—N/a
—N/a	7	Lennox Lewis	38–1–1 (29 KO)	Heavyweight	WBC and IBF
—N/a	8	Bernard Hopkins	38–2–1–1 (28 KO)	Middleweight	IBF
-3	9	Naseem Hamed	35–1 (31 KO)	Featherweight	—N/a
-1	10	Ricardo López	50–0–1 (37 KO)	Light flyweight	IBF

March 12, 2001
Changes	Rank	Boxer	Record	Weight class	Title(s)
—N/a	1	Shane Mosley	37–0 (34 KO)	Welterweight	WBC
—N/a	2	Felix Trinidad	39–0 (32 KO)	Light middleweight	WBA and IBF
—N/a	3	Floyd Mayweather Jr.	25–0 (19 KO)	Super featherweight	WBC
—N/a	4	Roy Jones Jr.	44–1 (36 KO)	Light heavyweight	WBA (Super), WBC, and IBF
—N/a	5	Oscar De La Hoya	32–2 (26 KO)	Welterweight	—N/a
—N/a	6	Naseem Hamed	35–0 (31 KO)	Featherweight	—N/a
—N/a	7	Lennox Lewis	38–1–1 (29 KO)	Heavyweight	WBC and IBF
—N/a	8	Bernard Hopkins	38–2–1–1 (28 KO)	Middleweight	IBF
+1	9	Marco Antonio Barrera	52–3–0–1 (38 KO)	Super bantamweight	WBO
New	10	Ricardo López	50–0–1 (37 KO)	Light flyweight	IBF

February 4, 2001
Changes	Rank	Boxer	Record	Weight class	Title(s)
—N/a	1	Shane Mosley	36–0 (33 KO)	Welterweight	WBC
—N/a	2	Felix Trinidad	39–0 (32 KO)	Light middleweight	WBA and IBF
+5	3	Floyd Mayweather Jr.	25–0 (19 KO)	Super featherweight	WBC
-1	4	Roy Jones Jr.	43–1 (35 KO)	Light heavyweight	WBA (Super), WBC, and IBF
-1	5	Oscar De La Hoya	32–2 (26 KO)	Welterweight	—N/a
—N/a	6	Naseem Hamed	35–0 (31 KO)	Featherweight	—N/a
—N/a	7	Lennox Lewis	38–1–1 (29 KO)	Heavyweight	WBC and IBF
+2	8	Bernard Hopkins	38–2–1–1 (28 KO)	Middleweight	IBF
-1	9	Erik Morales	39–0 (31 KO)	Featherweight	—N/a
New	10	Marco Antonio Barrera	52–3–0–1 (38 KO)	Super bantamweight	WBO

== 2000 ==
December 3, 2000
Changes	Rank	Boxer	Record	Weight class	Title(s)
—N/a	1	Shane Mosley	36–0 (33 KO)	Welterweight	WBC
+1	2	Felix Trinidad	39–0 (32 KO)	Light middleweight	WBA and IBF
-1	3	Roy Jones Jr.	43–1 (35 KO)	Light heavyweight	WBA, WBC, and IBF
—N/a	4	Oscar De La Hoya	32–2 (26 KO)	Welterweight	—N/a
—N/a	5	Diego Corrales	33–0 (27 KO)	Super featherweight	—N/a
—N/a	6	Naseem Hamed	34–0 (30 KO)	Featherweight	—N/a
—N/a	7	Floyd Mayweather Jr.	24–0 (18 KO)	Super featherweight	WBC
+2	8	Lennox Lewis	38–1–1 (29 KO)	Heavyweight	WBC and IBF
—N/a	8	Erik Morales	38–0 (30 KO)	Featherweight	—N/a
New	10	Bernard Hopkins	38–2–1–1 (28 KO)	Middleweight	IBF

September 11, 2000
Changes	Rank	Boxer	Record	Weight class	Title(s)
—N/a	1	Shane Mosley	35–0 (32 KO)	Welterweight	WBC
—N/a	2	Roy Jones Jr.	43–1 (35 KO)	Light heavyweight	WBA, WBC, and IBF
—N/a	3	Felix Trinidad	38–0 (31 KO)	Light middleweight	WBA
—N/a	4	Oscar De La Hoya	32–2 (26 KO)	Welterweight	—N/a
New	5	Diego Corrales	33–0 (27 KO)	Super featherweight	IBF
—N/a	6	Naseem Hamed	34–0 (30 KO)	Featherweight	WBO
-2	7	Floyd Mayweather Jr.	23–0 (17 KO)	Super featherweight	WBC
—N/a	8	Erik Morales	38–0 (30 KO)	Featherweight	—N/a
—N/a	9	Fernando Vargas	20–0 (18 KO)	Light middleweight	IBF
New	10	Lennox Lewis	37–1–1 (29 KO)	Heavyweight	WBC and IBF

July 5, 2000
Changes	Rank	Boxer	Record	Weight class	Title(s)
+1	1	Shane Mosley	35–0 (32 KO)	Welterweight	WBC
-1	2	Roy Jones Jr.	42–1 (34 KO)	Light heavyweight	WBA, WBC, and IBF
-1	3	Felix Trinidad	37–0 (30 KO)	Light middleweight	WBA
-1	4	Oscar De La Hoya	32–2 (26 KO)	Welterweight	—N/a
-1	5	Floyd Mayweather Jr.	23–0 (17 KO)	Super featherweight	WBC
+4	6	Naseem Hamed	34–0 (30 KO)	Featherweight	WBO
+1	7	Bernard Hopkins	37–2–1–1 (27 KO)	Middleweight	IBF
New	8	Erik Morales	37–0 (29 KO)	Featherweight	—N/a
New	9	Fernando Vargas	19–0 (17 KO)	Light middleweight	IBF
New	10	Marco Antonio Barrera	50–3–0–2 (37 KO)	Super bantamweight	WBO

May 21, 2000
Changes	Rank	Boxer	Record	Weight class	Title(s)
—N/a	1	Roy Jones Jr.	42–1 (34 KO)	Light heavyweight	WBA, WBC, and IBF
—N/a	2	Felix Trinidad	37–0 (30 KO)	Light middleweight	WBA
+1	3	Oscar De La Hoya	32–1 (26 KO)	Welterweight	WBC
-1	4	Floyd Mayweather Jr.	23–0 (17 KO)	Super featherweight	WBC
—N/a	5	Shane Mosley	34–0 (32 KO)	Welterweight	—N/a
—N/a	6	Mark Johnson	38–1–0–1 (25 KO)	Super flyweight	—N/a
—N/a	7	Ricardo López	49–0–1 (35 KO)	Light flyweight	IBF
—N/a	8	Bernard Hopkins	37–2–1–1 (27 KO)	Middleweight	IBF
—N/a	9	Stevie Johnston	30–1 (15 KO)	Lightweight	WBC
—N/a	10	Naseem Hamed	34–0 (30 KO)	Featherweight	WBO

March 21, 2000
Changes	Rank	Boxer	Record	Weight class	Title(s)
—N/a	1	Roy Jones Jr.	41–1 (33 KO)	Light heavyweight	WBA, WBC, and IBF
+1	2	Felix Trinidad	37–0 (30 KO)	Light middleweight	WBA
-1	3	Floyd Mayweather Jr.	23–0 (17 KO)	Super featherweight	WBC
—N/a	4	Oscar De La Hoya	32–1 (26 KO)	Welterweight	WBC
—N/a	5	Shane Mosley	34–0 (32 KO)	Welterweight	—N/a
—N/a	6	Mark Johnson	38–1–0–1 (25 KO)	Super flyweight	—N/a
—N/a	7	Ricardo López	49–0–1 (35 KO)	Light flyweight	IBF
+1	8	Bernard Hopkins	36–2–1–1 (27 KO)	Middleweight	IBF
+1	9	Stevie Johnston	30–1 (15 KO)	Lightweight	WBC
New	10	Naseem Hamed	34–0 (30 KO)	Featherweight	WBO

== See also ==
- List of The Ring pound for pound rankings
- List of The Ring pound for pound rankings (1990s)
- List of The Ring pound for pound rankings (2010s)
- List of The Ring pound for pound rankings (2020s)
- List of fights between two The Ring pound for pound boxers
- Boxing pound for pound rankings
- The Ring
- List of current world boxing champions
- List of undisputed boxing champions
- List of WBA world champions
- List of WBC world champions
- List of IBF world champions
- List of WBO world champions
- List of The Ring world champions
