= Mauricio Pastrana =

Colombian boxer (born 1973)

Personal information
- Nicknames: El Pintoso; Indio Boy
- Born: Mauricio Antonio Pastrana Tapi; January 20, 1973 (age 53) Montería, Colombia
- Height: 5 ft 5 in (165 cm)
- Weight: Light flyweight; Flyweight; Super flyweight; Bantamweight; Super bantamweight

Boxing career
- Reach: 66 1/2 in (169 cm)
- Stance: Orthodox

Boxing record
- Total fights: 54
- Wins: 35
- Win by KO: 24
- Losses: 17
- Draws: 2

Mauricio Antonio Pastrana Tapi (born 20 January 1973) is a Colombian former professional boxer. He is a former IBF light-flyweight champion.

== Professional career ==
Pastrana turned professional in October 1991. In his debut at Sincelejo, Colombia, Pastrana defeated fellow debutant Allende Rudino via second-round knockout. On January 18, 1997, Pastrana defeated Michael Carbajal in a twelve-round split decision at the Thomas & Mack Center in Las Vegas for the IBF light flyweight title.

Pastrana would challenge Rafael Marquez twice for the IBF bantamweight title, he would lose via eighth round stoppage in the second fight.

In June 2011 Pastrana would be the final opponent for future Hall of fame boxer Johnny Tapia, Johnny would pass away in May 2012.

== Professional boxing record ==
54 fights	35 wins	17 losses
By knockout	24	7
By decision	11	9
By disqualification	0	1
Draws	2	

No.	Result	Record	Opponent	Type	Round, time	Date	Location	Notes
54	Loss	35–17–2	Mikey Garcia	KO	2 (10), 1:05	1 Sep 2012	Arena TKT Box Tour, Los Mochis, Mexico	
53	Loss	35–16–2	Johnny Tapia	UD	8	4 Jun 2011	Hard Rock, Albuquerque, New Mexico, U.S.	
52	Loss	35–15–2	Gary Russell Jr.	TKO	1 (6), 1:46	22 Jul 2010	Club Nokia, Los Angeles, California, U.S.	
51	Loss	35–14–2	Mike Oliver	DQ	8 (8), 0:43	26 Jun 2010	Mohegan Sun Arena, Uncasville, Connecticut, U.S.	
50	Loss	35–13–2	Eden Sonsona	KO	8 (8), 1:33	13 Mar 2010	Cowboys Stadium, Arlington, Texas, U.S.	
49	Loss	35–12–2	Leon Moore	UD	12	26 Sep 2009	Cliff Anderson Sports Hall, Georgetown, Guyana	For vacant WBC–NABF bantamweight title
48	Loss	35–11–2	Victor Fonseca	UD	8	11 Jul 2009	BankAtlantic Center, Sunrise, Florida, U.S.	
47	Win	35–10–2	Victor Peralta	KO	3 (8), 2:15	19 Jun 2009	Coliseo Miguel "Happy" Lora, Montería, Colombia	
46	Loss	34–10–2	Matt Remillard	UD	6	13 Nov 2008	Dunkin' Donuts Center, Providence, Rhode Island, U.S.	
45	Loss	34–9–2	Jhonny González	TKO	4 (10), 2:32	16 May 2008	Morongo Casino Resort & Spa, Cabazon, California, U.S.	
44	Loss	34–8–2	Celestino Caballero	TKO	8 (12), 0:53	1 Dec 2007	Roberto Durán Arena, Panama City, Panama	For WBA super bantamweight title
43	Win	34–7–2	Antonio Escalante	TKO	8 (12), 2:10	26 Jan 2007	Cicero Stadium, Cicero, Illinois, U.S.	Won WBO–NABO super bantamweight title
42	Win	33–7–2	Osvaldo Cedeno	TKO	1 (10), 2:29	28 Oct 2006	Convention Center, Palm Beach, Florida, U.S.	
41	Loss	32–7–2	Diosdado Gabi	TKO	1 (8), 1:36	10 Aug 2006	The Orleans, Paradise, Nevada, U.S.	
40	Win	32–6–2	Pedro Rincon Miranda	UD	6	19 Apr 2006	Convention Center, Palm Beach, Florida, U.S.	
39	Loss	31–6–2	Alejandro Valdez	UD	12	11 Feb 2006	Centro de Espectaculos Modelo, Ciudad Obregón, Mexico	For vacant NABF bantamweight title
38	Draw	31–5–2	Alexander Khrulev	PTS	10	15 Oct 2005	Baluan Sholak Sports Palace, Almaty, Kazakhstan	
37	Loss	31–5–1	Rafael Márquez	TKO	8 (12), 3:00	27 Nov 2004	MGM Grand Garden Arena, Paradise, Nevada, U.S.	For IBF bantamweight title
36	Win	31–4–1	Marat Mazimbayev	TKO	9 (10), 0:55	30 Mar 2004	Great Western Forum, Inglewood, California, U.S.	
35	Loss	30–4–1	Rafael Márquez	UD	12	4 Oct 2003	Staples Center, Los Angeles, California, U.S.	For IBF bantamweight title
34	Win	30–3–1	Mike Trejo	TKO	2 (12), 2:59	17 May 2003	Thunderbird Wild West Casino, Norman, Oklahoma, U.S.	Won vacant IBA bantamweight title
33	Win	29–3–1	Evaristo Primero	TKO	8 (12), 1:48	3 Jan 2003	Thunderbird Wild West Casino, Norman, Oklahoma, U.S.	Retained IBA super flyweight title
32	Draw	28–3–1	Isidro García	TD	2 (10), 2:47	9 Jul 2002	Playboy Mansion, Beverly Hills, California, U.S.	
31	Win	28–3	Alberto Ontiveros	TKO	9 (12), 1:43	2 Nov 2001	Sunset Station, San Antonio, Texas, U.S.	Retained IBA super flyweight title
30	Win	27–3	Gerson Guerrero	TKO	10 (12), 2:53	14 Jul 2001	Pavilion, Houston, Texas, U.S.	Retained IBA super flyweight title
29	Loss	26–3	Félix Machado	UD	12	16 Jun 2001	Cintas Center, Cincinnati, Ohio, U.S.	For IBF super flyweight title
28	Win	26–2	José López	UD	12	10 Feb 2001	Miccosukee Indian Gaming Resort, Miami, Florida, U.S.	Retained IBA super flyweight title
27	Win	25–2	Roberto Lopez	UD	10	26 Nov 2000	Regent Hotel & Casino, Summerlin, Nevada, U.S.	
26	Win	24–2	Heriberto Ruiz	UD	12	20 Aug 2000	Harrah's North Kansas City, Kansas City, Missouri, U.S.	
25	Loss	23–2	Adan Vargas	SD	12	16 Jul 2000	Arizona Charlie's Boulder, Paradise, Nevada, U.S.	For WBC–NABF bantamweight title
24	Loss	23–1	Jorge Lacierva	UD	12	16 Feb 2000	Miccosukee Indian Gaming Resort, Miami, Florida	For vacant IBA bantamweight title
23	Win	23–0	Ablorh Sowah	UD	10	9 Jan 2000	Casino Magic, Bay St. Louis, Mississippi, U.S.	
22	Win	22–0	Darryl Pinckney	PTS	6	12 Dec 1999	Miccosukee Resort & Gaming, Miami, Florida, U.S.	
21	Win	21–0	Edison Torres	PTS	12	3 Apr 1999	Hilton Hotel, Cartagena, Colombia	Won IBO super flyweight title
20	Win	20–0	Jose Bonilla	UD	12	3 Oct 1998	Gimnasio Jose Beracasa, Caracas, Venezuela	Won inaugural Interim WBA flyweight title
19	Win	19–0	Carlos Murillo	TKO	9 (12), 2:50	29 Aug 1998	Las Vegas Hilton, Winchester, Nevada, U.S.	
18	Win	18–0	Anis Roga	KO	4 (12), 1:20	30 Apr 1998	The Chili Pepper, Fort Lauderdale, Florida, U.S.	Retained IBF junior flyweight title
17	Win	17–0	Manuel Jesus Herrera	TKO	3 (12), 1:57	13 Dec 1997	Amphitheater, Pompano Beach, Florida, U.S.	Won vacant IBF junior flyweight title
16	Win	16–0	Michael Carbajal	SD	12	18 Jan 1997	Thomas & Mack Center, Paradise, Nevada, U.S.	Won IBF junior flyweight title
15	Win	15–0	Luis Doria	TKO	6 (12)	16 Aug 1996	Montería, Colombia	Retained IBF Latino light-flyweight title
14	Win	14–0	Roger Rodriguez	KO	2 (6)	24 May 1996	Coliseo Kid Dumlop, Santa Marta, Colombia	
13	Win	13–0	Dunoy Pena	TKO	6 (8)	29 Dec 1995	Montería, Colombia	
12	Win	12–0	Robinson Mercado	KO	2 (?)	21 Apr 1995	Sincelejo, Colombia	
11	Win	11–0	Jose Garcia Bernal	TKO	5 (10)	30 Sep 1994	Cartagena, Colombia	
10	Win	10–0	Oswaldo Osorio	TKO	2 (8)	16 Sep 1994	Sincelejo, Colombia	
9	Win	9–0	Livaniel Alvarez	TKO	8 (10)	11 Feb 1994	Cartagena, Colombia	
8	Win	8–0	Henry Casarrubia	TKO	4 (?)	17 Dec 1993	Cartagena, Colombia	
7	Win	7–0	Gabriel Pava	TKO	2 (?)	20 Jul 1993	Sincelejo, Colombia	
6	Win	6–0	Carlos Martinez	TKO	3 (?)	20 Mar 1993	Sincelejo, Colombia	
5	Win	5–0	Alfredo Lugo	PTS	6	14 Nov 1992	Sincelejo, Colombia	
4	Win	4–0	Fidel Julio	KO	3 (?)	3 Oct 1992	Sincelejo, Colombia	
3	Win	3–0	Luis Escarpeta	TKO	3 (?)	22 May 1992	Sincelejo, Colombia	
2	Win	2–0	Jose Benitez	PTS	4	1 Nov 1991	Sincelejo, Colombia	
1	Win	1–0	Allende Rudino	KO	2 (4)	7 Jun 1991	San Onofre, Colombia	

== See also ==
- List of world light-flyweight boxing champions

Sporting positions
Regional boxing titles
Preceded by Luis Doria	IBF Latino light-flyweight champion August 16, 1996 – January 18, 1997; Won world title	Vacant Title next held by Nerys Espinoza
Preceded by Antonio Escalante	NABO super-bantamweight champion January 26, 2007 – 2007; Vacated	Vacant Title next held by Olivier Lontchi
Minor World boxing titles
Preceded by Edison Torres	IBO super-flyweight champion April 3, 1999 – 1999; Vacated	Vacant Title next held by Lunga Ntontela
Vacant Title last held by Eric Morel	IBA super-flyweight champion February 10, 2001 – 2003; Vacated	Vacant Title next held by José Navarro
Vacant Title last held by Vernie Torres	IBA bantamweight champion May 17, 2003 – 2003; Vacated	Vacant Title next held by Cecilio Santos
Major World boxing titles
Preceded by Michael Carbajal	IBF light-flyweight champion January 18, 1997 – May 9, 1997; Stripped, did not face mandatory	Vacant Title next held by Himself
Vacant Title last held by Himself	IBF light-flyweight champion December 13, 1997 – August 28, 1998; Stripped, did not make weight	Vacant Title next held by Will Grigsby
New title	WBA flyweight champion Interim title October 3, 1998 – 1999; Vacated	Vacant Title next held by Roberto Vásquez
