= Silence Mabuza =

South African boxer

Personal information
- Nicknames: "African Spice" "The Real Deal"
- Nationality: (South Africa) South African
- Born: Silence Mabuza; 18 September 1977 (age 48) Tsakane, South Africa
- Height: 5 ft 6 in (1.68 m)
- Weight: Bantamweight

Boxing career
- Reach: 70 cm (28 in)
- Stance: Orthodox

Boxing record
- Total fights: 26
- Wins: 23
- Win by KO: 19
- Losses: 3
- Draws: 0
- No contests: 0

Silence Mabuza (born 18 September 1977 in Tsakane, South Africa) is a professional boxer in the bantamweight (118 lb) division, and as of 6 Jan. 2008, is a former two time holder of the International Boxing Organization's world Bantamweight title.

Mabuza, who reportedly had more than 400 amateur bouts, started his pro career on 28 Nov. 1999, with a second-round TKO of Masinghita Hlungwane (lifetime record 1–3) at Portuguese Hall, in Johannesburg, Gauteng, South Africa. He carved through six more opponents, all by knockout, in his native South Africa, before branching out to fight British journeyman Anthony Hanna (lifetime 22-77-7 as of 12 Dec. 2008) on 4 April 2004, in Liverpool. Mabuza won by decision.

Known as "African Spice" or "The Real Deal," typically fighting in white trunks decorated with a leopard-print "skirt" of wide tassels, Mabuza returned to South Africa to log two more wins, running his record to 10–0, before taking the International Boxing Organization world Bantamweight title from Colombia's Jose Sanjuanelo with a sixth-round TKO on 2 March 2002, at Carnival City in Brakpan, South Africa.

Mabuza won his next seven fights, five by knockout, successfully defending his title six times, between 27 July 2002 (TKO of Zolile Mbityi in South Africa) and 13 May 2005 (unanimous decision over Cruz Carbajal at the Plaza Hotel & Casino, Las Vegas, Nevada). Having earned a shot at the International Boxing Federation Bantamweight title held by Rafael Marquez (boxer), Mabuza met that champion on 5 Nov. 2005, in Lake Tahoe, Nevada, but was stopped in the fourth round by a serious cut over his right eye. (He was also cut under his left eye, and had been knocked down in Round 1). Mabuza lost his IBO title to Marquez, who unified the two belts.

Mabuza traveled to New York City to defeat Ricardo Vargas in a 12-round, unanimous decision on 20 April 2006, to gain a second title shot vs. Marquez, for the IBO and IBF Bantamweight titles. This time, on 5 Aug. 2006, again in Lake Tahoe, Mabuza lasted much longer, but lost when his corner threw in the towel in the ninth round. Marquez had scored a disallowed knockdown due to a low blow in the second, but thereafter had bloodied Mabuza's nose, cut him beside the right eye, and dealt two parallel cuts on his left cheek in Round 8. Mabuza had fought through a swollen right eye for five rounds, as well, when the fight was stopped after two rounds in which the action heavily favored Marquez.

Mabuza has since returned to his home in South Africa, where he has continued to fight, logging three victories since his second title-shot loss to Marquez. He stopped Tanzanian Mbwana Matumla in the fifth round on 12 May 2007, to regain the IBO Bantamweight title, which had been vacated by Marquez's ascension to the Super Bantamweight division. Mabuza defeated Eden Sonsona of the Philippines to defend his title on 2 Feb. 2008, when the challenger retired from the bout after being knocked down at the final bell of Round 8. On 5 Jan. 2008) he defeated Damian David Marchiano of Argentina by TKO on 31 May 2008, to put Mabuza's sanctioned record at 22–2 with 16 knockouts.

On 29 May 2009 Mabuza suffered his third loss to Colombian Yonny Perez by TKO in the 12th round in an IBF Bantamweight eliminator.
