= Israel Vázquez =

Mexican boxer (1977–2024)

Personal information
- Nickname: Magnifico ("Magnificent")
- Born: Israel Vázquez Castañeda; December 25, 1977 Mexico City, Mexico
- Died: December 3, 2024 (aged 46) Los Angeles, California, U.S.
- Height: 5 ft 5 1/2 in (166 cm)
- Weight: Super bantamweight; Featherweight

Boxing career
- Reach: 67 in (170 cm)
- Stance: Orthodox

Boxing record
- Total fights: 49
- Wins: 44
- Win by KO: 32
- Losses: 5

Israel Vázquez Castañeda (December 25, 1977 – December 3, 2024) was a Mexican professional boxer who competed from 1995 to 2010. He was a three-time super bantamweight world champion, having held the IBF title from 2004 to 2005; and the WBC, The Ring titles twice from 2005 to 2008. Vázquez is best known for his series of four fights against fellow Mexican Rafael Márquez.

== Professional career ==
In 1995, Vázquez made his professional debut in the bantamweight division at the age of 17. He stopped his first nine opponents before suffering a knock out loss himself. Fighting mainly in the U.S. and at junior featherweight, he beat 11 opponents, most notably Óscar Larios (20–0), before losing a split decision to Marcos Licona.

Vázquez scored 12 consecutive victories, and in 2002, he met Larios in a rematch for the interim WBC Super Bantamweight Title . This time, he was outboxed and stopped in the 12th round.

Vázquez rebounded with a stoppage of ex-world title holder Jorge Eliecer Julio and won the vacant IBF Junior Featherweight title against southpaw Jose Luis Valbuena in 2004.

In the first defence of his IBF title he knocked out undefeated Armenian Artyom Simonyan in the 5th round. In 2005, Vázquez opted to fight WBC champion Óscar Larios for a third time with the WBC belt on the line instead of defending his IBF belt. He won the rubber match by technical knockout in the third round — after the fight was stopped due to a large cut over Larios's left eye, thus becoming The Ring and Lineal Junior Featherweight champion and ending Lario's streak of nine consecutive title fight victories.

On June 10, 2006, Vázquez defeated former champion Ivan Hernández (23–1–1). Vázquez defeated the WBO Bantamweight champion Jhonny González on September 16, 2006, in a bout where Vázquez was knocked down twice before coming back to win the match by 10th-round TKO.

=== Vázquez vs. Márquez ===
In his next bout, on March 3, 2007, Vázquez lost his title to the number one ranked Bantamweight Rafael Márquez. Although Vazquez scored a knockdown in the third round, he retired on his stool at the end of round seven because of breathing problems arising from a broken nose. In a rematch on August 4, 2007, Vásquez regained his title. Despite suffering cuts over both eyes, he scored a knockout against Márquez in the sixth round in a fight that was named Ring Magazine's fight of the year for 2007. The third round of this fight was also named Ring Magazine round of the year.

He fought Marquez for the third time on March 1, 2008, rising from a fourth round knockdown to prevail by split decision in another great fight. Márquez was docked one point for low blows in round ten and received an eight count in the final seconds of round twelve. The fight was named 2008's Fight of the Year by The Ring Magazine and the fourth round was named Ring Magazine round of the year. The Vázquez vs Márquez rivalry has been widely heralded as one of the best boxing rivalries in recent years.

On December 18, 2008, Vázquez was stripped of his WBC Super Bantamweight Championship after not defending the title for a certain period of time due to a detached retina he had suffered during his third fight with Márquez. Japanese fighter Toshiaki Nishioka's WBC Interim title was promoted to actual championship status after his victory over Genaro Garcia. After undergoing three surgeries, Vázquez was medically cleared to resume training on May 15, 2009.

Vázquez fought Marquez for a fourth time on May 22, 2010. The bout took place in the Featherweight division and was held at the Staples Center in Los Angeles, California, United States. The match was appropriately titled "Once and Four All" and carried live by Showtime. Marquez scored a third-round TKO victory over Vázquez to even their series at two wins each. Afterwards, Marquez stated: "The fifth one could be a possibility if the fans vote for it. That is what I live for. Israel Vázquez is a great fighter." However, it was felt by some observers that the much faded Vázquez should retire. Frank Espinoza, Vázquez's longtime handler, stated that his "career is over". The fourth installment of the Vázquez-Marquez rivalry was the last fight of Vázquez' career.

== Personal life and death ==
In October 2024 Vazquez was diagnosed with stage 4 sarcoma; he died from cancer in Los Angeles on December 3, 2024, at the age of 46.

== Professional boxing record ==
49 fights	44 wins	5 losses
By knockout	32	4
By decision	11	1
By disqualification	1	0

No.	Result	Record	Opponent	Type	Round, time	Date	Location	Notes
49	Loss	44–5	Rafael Márquez	KO	3 (12), 1:33	May 22, 2010	Staples Center, Los Angeles, California, U.S.	For vacant WBC Silver featherweight title
48	Win	44–4	Angel Antonio Priolo	KO	9 (10), 2:10	Oct 10, 2009	Nokia Theatre L.A. Live, Los Angeles, California, U.S.	
47	Win	43–4	Rafael Márquez	SD	12	Mar 1, 2008	Home Depot Center, Carson, California, U.S.	Retained WBC and The Ring super bantamweight titles
46	Win	42–4	Rafael Márquez	TKO	6 (12), 1:16	Aug 4, 2007	Dodge Arena, Hidalgo, Texas, U.S.	Won WBC and The Ring super bantamweight titles
45	Loss	41–4	Rafael Márquez	RTD	7 (12), 3:00	Mar 3, 2007	Home Depot Center, Carson, California, U.S.	Lost WBC and The Ring super bantamweight titles
44	Win	41–3	Jhonny González	TKO	10 (12), 2:09	Sep 16, 2006	MGM Grand Garden Arena, Paradise, Nevada, U.S.	Retained WBC and The Ring super bantamweight titles
43	Win	40–3	Ivan Hernández	RTD	4 (12), 3:00	Jun 10, 2006	Boardwalk Hall, Atlantic City, New Jersey, U.S.	Retained WBC and The Ring super bantamweight titles
42	Win	39–3	Óscar Larios	TKO	3 (12), 2:52	Dec 3, 2005	Mandalay Bay Events Center, Paradise, Nevada, U.S.	Won WBC and vacant The Ring super bantamweight titles
41	Win	38–3	Armando Guerrero	UD	12	May 31, 2005	Ho-Chunk Sports and Expo Center, Lynwood, Illinois, U.S.	Retained IBF super bantamweight title
40	Win	37–3	Artyom Simonyan	TKO	5 (12), 0:59	Dec 28, 2004	Sycuan Casino, El Cajon, California, U.S.	Retained IBF super bantamweight title
39	Win	36–3	José Luis Valbuena	TKO	12 (12), 0:34	Mar 25, 2004	Grand Olympic Auditorium, Los Angeles, California, U.S.	Won vacant IBF super bantamweight title
38	Win	35–3	Trinidad Mendoza	TKO	7 (10), 2:45	Sep 19, 2003	Centennial Garden, Bakersfield, California, U.S.	
37	Win	34–3	Jorge Eliécer Julio	TKO	10 (10), 1:15	May 22, 2003	SBC Center, San Antonio, Texas, U.S.	
36	Win	33–3	Justo Almazan	UD	8	Sep 26, 2002	Holiday Inn Express, National City, California, U.S.	
35	Loss	32–3	Óscar Larios	TKO	12 (12), 1:57	May 17, 2002	Memorial Auditorium, Sacramento, California, U.S.	For vacant WBC interim super bantamweight title
34	Win	32–2	Osvaldo Guerrero	UD	10	Feb 22, 2002	Quiet Cannon, Montebello, California, U.S.	
33	Win	31–2	Felipe Ramirez	KO	5 (8), 0:48	Oct 25, 2001	Marriott Hotel, Irvine, California, U.S.	
32	Win	30–2	Ever Beleno	KO	2 (12), 1:49	May 19, 2001	Fantasy Springs Resort Casino, Indio, California, U.S.	Retained NABF super bantamweight title
31	Win	29–2	Don Don Concepcion	TKO	3 (12), 1:31	Jan 7, 2001	Texas Station, North Las Vegas, Nevada, U.S.	Won vacant NABF super bantamweight title
30	Win	28–2	Eddy Saenz	KO	2 (10), 2:12	Oct 27, 2000	Quiet Cannon, Montebello, California, U.S.	
29	Win	27–2	Javier Varguez	KO	3 (10), 1:54	Aug 17, 2000	Arrowhead Pond, Anaheim, California, U.S.	
28	Win	26–2	Amador Vasquez	TKO	2 (10), 1:54	Jul 29, 2000	Caesars Tahoe, Stateline, Nevada, U.S.	
27	Win	25–2	Eddy Saenz	KO	3 (12)	May 6, 2000	Fantasy Springs Resort Casino, Indio, California, U.S.	Won IBA Continental super bantamweight title
26	Win	24–2	Héctor Velázquez	SD	10	Feb 4, 2000	Fantasy Springs Resort Casino, Indio, California, U.S.	
25	Win	23–2	Edel Ruiz	UD	8	Jan 7, 2000	Memorial Auditorium, Sacramento, California, U.S.	
24	Win	22–2	Adarryl Johnson	MD	6	Oct 3, 1999	Lady Luck Rhythm & Blues, Lula, Mississippi, U.S.	
23	Win	21–2	Nelson Ramon Medina	KO	7 (10), 1:26	Aug 9, 1999	Arrowhead Pond, Anaheim, California, U.S.	
22	Loss	20–2	Marcos Licona	SD	12	Mar 27, 1999	Tropicana Las Vegas, Paradise, Nevada, U.S.	For vacant WBO–NABO super bantamweight title
21	Win	20–1	Agustin Lorenzo	TKO	8 (10)	Nov 30, 1998	Arrowhead Pond, Anaheim, California, U.S.	
20	Win	19–1	Frank Lizarraga	UD	6	Oct 22, 1998	Scottish Rite Center, San Diego, California, U.S.	
19	Win	18–1	Juan Manuel Chavez	UD	10	Aug 10, 1998	Arrowhead Pond, Anaheim, California, U.S.	
18	Win	17–1	Oscar Javier Garcia	TKO	4	Jun 8, 1998	Arrowhead Pond, Anaheim, California, U.S.	
17	Win	16–1	Antonio Ramirez	UD	6	Mar 15, 1998	Sycuan Casino, El Cajon, California, U.S.	
16	Win	15–1	Saul Briseno	TD	8	Feb 21, 1998	Mexico City, Mexico	
15	Win	14–1	Enrique Angeles	TKO	9	Aug 30, 1997	Mexico City, Mexico	
14	Win	13–1	Marcello Nava	TKO	4	Jun 14, 1997	Mexico City, Mexico	
13	Win	12–1	Óscar Larios	KO	1 (10)	Apr 12, 1997	Arena Coliseo, Mexico City, Mexico	
12	Win	11–1	Erik Lopez	TKO	3	Mar 29, 1997	Mexico City, Mexico	
11	Win	10–1	Abraham Barrientos	TKO	5	Nov 30, 1996	Mexico City, Mexico	
10	Loss	9–1	Ulises Flores	TKO	1	Oct 5, 1996	Mexico City, Mexico	
9	Win	9–0	Saul Briseno	TKO	3	Sep 7, 1996	Mexico City, Mexico	
8	Win	8–0	Enrique Martinez	TKO	1	May 3, 1996	Salina Cruz, Oaxaca, Mexico	
7	Win	7–0	Joel Nolasco	KO	2	Apr 19, 1996	Salina Cruz, Oaxaca, Mexico	
6	Win	6–0	Cecilio Marino Jimenez	KO	7	Mar 8, 1996	Salina Cruz, Oaxaca, Mexico	
5	Win	5–0	Alejandro Pantaleon	KO	3	Feb 16, 1996	Salina Cruz, Oaxaca, Mexico	
4	Win	4–0	Raul Gonzales	DQ	4	Sep 6, 1995	Mexico City, Mexico	Gonzales disqualified for an intentional headbutt
3	Win	3–0	Jesus Romero	TKO	1	Jun 21, 1995	Mexico City, Mexico	
2	Win	2–0	Sergio Lopez	KO	1	Apr 19, 1995	Mexico City, Mexico	
1	Win	1–0	Eduardo Rosas	TKO	1 (4)	Mar 29, 1995	Mexico City, Mexico	Professional debut

== See also ==
- List of super bantamweight boxing champions
- List of WBC world champions
- List of IBF world champions
- List of Mexican boxing world champions

Sporting positions
Regional boxing titles
Vacant Title last held by Roberto Lopez	NABF super bantamweight champion January 7, 2001 – April 2002; Vacated	Vacant Title next held by Ricardo Medina
World boxing titles
Vacant Title last held by Manny Pacquiao	IBF super bantamweight champion March 25, 2004 – December 2005; Vacated	Vacant Title next held by Steve Molitor
Preceded by Óscar Larios	WBC super bantamweight champion December 3, 2005 – March 3, 2007	Succeeded by Rafael Márquez
Vacant Title last held by Paulie Ayala	The Ring super bantamweight champion December 3, 2005 – March 3, 2007	Succeeded by Rafael Márquez
Vacant Title last held by Wilfredo Gómez	Lineal super bantamweight champion December 3, 2005 – March 3, 2007	Succeeded by Rafael Márquez
Preceded by Rafael Márquez	WBC super bantamweight champion August 4, 2007 – December 18, 2008; Vacated	Vacant Title next held by Steve Molitor
Preceded by Rafael Márquez	The Ring super bantamweight champion August 4, 2007 – May 31, 2009; Vacated	Vacant Title next held by Nonito Donaire
Preceded by Rafael Márquez	Lineal super bantamweight champion August 4, 2007 – May 31, 2009; Vacated	Vacant Title next held by Nonito Donaire
Awards
Previous: Somsak Sithchatchawal vs. Mahyar Monshipour	The Ring Fight of the Year vs. Márquez II, III; 2007, 2008	Next: Juan Manuel Márquez vs. Juan Díaz
Previous: Somsak Sithchatchawal vs. Mahyar Monshipour	BWAA Fight of the Year vs. Márquez III; 2008	Next: Juan Manuel Márquez vs. Juan Díaz
