= Rafael Márquez (boxer) =

Mexican boxer (born 1975)

Personal information
- Born: Rafael Márquez Méndez; March 25, 1975 (age 51) Mexico City, Mexico
- Height: 5 ft 5 1/2 in (166 cm)
- Weight: Bantamweight; Super bantamweight; Featherweight

Boxing career
- Reach: 68 in (173 cm)
- Stance: Orthodox

Boxing record
- Total fights: 50
- Wins: 41
- Win by KO: 37
- Losses: 9

Rafael Márquez Méndez (born 25 March 1975) is a Mexican former professional boxer who competed from 1995 to 2013. He is a two-time world champion in two weight classes, having held the IBF bantamweight title from 2003 to 2007; and the WBC, and Ring magazine super bantamweight titles in 2007. He also held the IBO bantamweight title from 2005 to 2007, and challenged once for WBO featherweight title in 2011. Márquez was inducted into the International Boxing Hall of Fame as part of the class of 2023.

Márquez was known for his formidable knockout power and relentless pressure fighting style. His older brother Juan Manuel Márquez is also a former professional boxer and multiple-time world champion.

== Professional career ==
Márquez began his professional boxing career with an eighth-round knockout loss to former WBC Bantamweight champion Victor Rabanales.

He gained recognition by defeating two division world champion and future hall of fame member Mark Johnson (40-1-0) by a split decision. In a rematch, Márquez knocked out Johnson in the eighth round in an IBF bantamweight title eliminator bout.

=== Bantamweight ===
On February 15, 2003, he came from behind to knock out Tim Austin (25-0-1) to claim the IBF Bantamweight title, in what was considered to be a big upset. Austin had been undefeated in 10 title fights until that loss. Márquez went on to successfully defend his title seven times. His notable title defenses were two victories over former light flyweight champion Mauricio Pastrana, a decision win over Ricardo Vargas and two knockout victories over former as well as future IBO Bantamweight champion Silence Mabuza, whom he defeated for the second time on August 5, 2006 in his final defense.

=== Super Bantamweight ===
Márquez moved up a weight division to challenge and defeat WBC and lineal super bantamweight champion Israel Vázquez in seven rounds. However, in a rematch in July 2007, Márquez lost his title after being defeated by Vázquez in the sixth round when the referee stopped the fight. The rematch was named the 2007 fight of the year. In the rubber match of their trilogy, Rafael lost a split decision, with scores of 113-112 and 114-111 to Vázquez, with one judge seeing it 114-111 for Márquez. Márquez may not have lost this bout if not for a point deduction for a low blow in the tenth round. Marquez and promoter Gary Shaw claimed that the punch was on the belt line and should not have elicited any deductions. Márquez was able to knock Vázquez down for the first time in the trilogy in this third fight, but Vázquez in turn put Márquez down in the final seconds of the 12th round, securing the victory and giving Márquez his fifth defeat.

Márquez was ranked number three in The Ring magazine's pound-for-pound rankings. and ranked as the Ring Magazine's number one Bantamweight boxer. He later became the top ranked boxer in the Super Bantamweight division before his loss to Vázquez.

=== Featherweight ===
Márquez was inactive for over a year as he recuperated from the trilogy with Vázquez. On May 23, 2009, he returned to the ring by scoring a 3rd-round TKO over José Francisco Mendoza (21-2-2) in the featherweight division.

In the first week of May 2010, Márquez announced his 4th and final match with Israel Vásquez. After three epic battles, Vázquez and Márquez fought for a fourth time on May 22, 2010 at the Staples Center in Los Angeles, California. The bout was appropriately titled "Once and Four All" and carried live by Showtime. Márquez scored a third-round TKO victory over Vázquez to even their series at two wins each. Afterwards, Márquez stated; "The fifth one could be a possibility if the fans vote for it. That is what I live for. Israel Vásquez is a great fighter."

In his next fight, he was scheduled to challenge undefeated WBO Featherweight champion Juan Manuel Lopez on September 18, 2010, however, the fight had to be postponed by several weeks when Márquez suffered a thumb injury which prevented him from training. Márquez would ultimately lose the bout by 8th-round TKO after he was unable to continue due to a shoulder injury. After the fight, Márquez said that he had chosen to proceed with the bout despite a right shoulder injury suffered before the contest because he did not wish to cause a second delay. According to Márquez, he re-aggravated that injury in the third round during a flurry of punches. He also expressed his eagerness to face Lopez in a rematch. It was later revealed that Márquez had suffered a hairline fracture in his right shoulder blade during the fight and would require 6 months to recover from the injury.

=== Return to Super Bantamweight ===
On 16 July 2011, Márquez made his comeback in Cancún on the same card as his brother, Juan Manuel, against Eduardo Becerril. Both fights were tune-ups and the younger Márquez brother comfortably dealt with his opponent, knocking him down once on the way to a 6th-round TKO.

Márquez fought against WBC Super Bantamweight champion Toshiaki Nishioka on 1 October at the MGM Grand Garden Arena in Las Vegas. Marquez lost by unanimous decision.

== Professional boxing record ==
50 fights	41 wins	9 losses
By knockout	37	7
By decision	4	2

No.	Result	Record	Opponent	Type	Round, time	Date	Location	Notes
50	Loss	41–9	Efrain Esquivias	KO	9 (12), 0:19	Sep 7, 2013	Fantasy Springs Resort Casino, Indio, California, U.S.	
49	Loss	41–8	Cristian Mijares	TKO	9 (12), 1:59	Oct 27, 2012	Mexico City Arena, Mexico City, Mexico	
48	Win	41–7	Eric Aiken	KO	1 (10), 2:26	May 5, 2012	Auditorio Municipal, Tijuana, Mexico	
47	Loss	40–7	Toshiaki Nishioka	UD	12	Oct 1, 2011	MGM Grand Marquee Ballroom, Paradise, Nevada, U.S.	For WBC super bantamweight title
46	Win	40–6	Eduardo Becerril	RTD	6 (10), 0:10	Jul 16, 2011	Plaza de Toros, Cancún, Mexico	
45	Loss	39–6	Juan Manuel López	RTD	8 (12), 3:00	Nov 6, 2010	MGM Grand Garden Arena, Paradise, Nevada, U.S.	For WBO featherweight title
44	Win	39–5	Israel Vázquez	KO	3 (12), 1:33	May 22, 2010	Staples Center, Los Angeles, California, U.S.	Won vacant WBC Silver featherweight title
43	Win	38–5	Jose Francisco Mendoza	TKO	3 (10), 2:26	May 23, 2009	Monterrey Arena, Monterrey, Mexico	
42	Loss	37–5	Israel Vázquez	SD	12	Mar 1, 2008	Home Depot Center, Carson, California, U.S.	For WBC and The Ring super bantamweight titles
41	Loss	37–4	Israel Vázquez	TKO	6 (12), 1:16	Aug 4, 2007	Dodge Arena, Hidalgo, Texas, U.S.	Lost WBC and The Ring super bantamweight titles
40	Win	37–3	Israel Vázquez	RTD	7 (12), 3:00	Mar 3, 2007	Home Depot Center, Carson, California, U.S.	Won WBC and The Ring super bantamweight titles
39	Win	36–3	Silence Mabuza	RTD	9 (12), 3:00	Aug 5, 2006	MontBleu, Stateline, Nevada, U.S.	Retained IBF and IBO bantamweight titles
38	Win	35–3	Silence Mabuza	TKO	4 (12), 2:08	Nov 5, 2005	Caesars Tahoe, Stateline, Nevada, U.S.	Retained IBF bantamweight title; Won IBO bantamweight title
37	Win	34–3	Ricardo Vargas	UD	12	May 28, 2005	Staples Center, Los Angeles, California, U.S.	Retained IBF bantamweight title
36	Win	33–3	Mauricio Pastrana	TKO	8 (12), 3:00	Nov 27, 2004	MGM Grand Garden Arena, Paradise, Nevada, U.S.	Retained IBF bantamweight title
35	Win	32–3	Heriberto Ruiz	KO	3 (12), 2:11	Jul 31, 2004	MGM Grand Garden Arena, Paradise, Nevada, U.S.	Retained IBF bantamweight title
34	Win	31–3	Peter Frissina	TKO	2 (12), 2:00	Jan 31, 2004	Dodge Theatre, Phoenix, Arizona, U.S.	Retained IBF bantamweight title
33	Win	30–3	Mauricio Pastrana	UD	12	Oct 4, 2003	Staples Center, Los Angeles, California, U.S.	Retained IBF bantamweight title
32	Win	29–3	Tim Austin	TKO	8 (12), 2:20	Feb 15, 2003	Caesars Palace, Paradise, Nevada, U.S.	Won IBF bantamweight title
31	Win	28–3	Jorge Otero	RTD	6 (10), 0:10	Jul 12, 2002	La Villa Real Convention Center, McAllen, Texas, U.S.	
30	Win	27–3	Mark Johnson	TKO	8 (12), 2:41	Feb 23, 2002	Mandalay Bay Events Center, Paradise, Nevada, U.S.	Won vacant USBA bantamweight title
29	Win	26–3	Mark Johnson	SD	10	Oct 6, 2001	Memorial Coliseum, Corpus Christi, Texas, U.S.	
28	Win	25–3	Gerardo Espinoza	TKO	4 (12)	Jul 6, 2001	Jai Alai Frontón Palacios, Tijuana, Mexico	Won vacant WBA Fedecentro bantamweight title
27	Win	24–3	Miguel Ochoa	TKO	2 (10)	Jun 1, 2001	Poliforum Zamna, Mérida, Mexico	
26	Win	23–3	Jovy Chan	KO	3 (8), 1:05	Apr 1, 2001	Peppermill, Reno, Nevada, U.S.	
25	Win	22–3	Aquiles Guzman	RTD	7 (12), 0:10	Dec 16, 2000	Forum Bicentenario, Maracay, Venezuela	Won vacant WBA Fedelatin bantamweight title
24	Loss	21–3	Genaro Garcia	KO	2 (10), 1:36	Nov 12, 2000	Regency Hotel, Denver, Colorado, U.S.	
23	Win	21–2	Tomas Rivera	KO	2 (10), 1:12	Aug 20, 2000	Convention Center, Tucson, Arizona, U.S.	
22	Win	20–2	Arturo Estrada	TKO	2 (10)	Jun 23, 2000	Poliforum Zamna, Mérida, Mexico	
21	Win	19–2	Ricardo Barrera	TKO	1 (10)	Apr 14, 2000	Poliforum Zamna, Mérida, Mexico	
20	Win	18–2	Adrian Cristian Ochoa	TKO	4 (10), 0:47	Aug 23, 1999	Great Western Forum, Inglewood, U.S.	
19	Win	17–2	Angel Almena	KO	1 (10), 2:53	May 10, 1999	Great Western Forum, Inglewood, U.S.	
18	Win	16–2	Jose Guadalupe Gastelum	RTD	6 (10), 3:00	Mar 8, 1999	Arrowhead Pond, Anaheim, California, U.S.	
17	Win	15–2	Ricardo Barrera	KO	1	Oct 24, 1998	Tropicana, Paradise, Nevada, U.S.	
16	Win	14–2	Dario Diaz	TKO	2	Aug 22, 1998	Tropicana, Paradise, Nevada, U.S.	
15	Win	13–2	Ivan Salazar	KO	3 (8), 1:04	Jun 20, 1998	Tropicana, Paradise, Nevada, U.S.	
14	Loss	12–2	Francisco Mateos	TKO	3 (10)	May 2, 1998	Arena Coliseo, Mexico City, Mexico	
13	Win	12–1	Beldevear Meza	KO	3	Apr 6, 1998	Arrowhead Pond, Anaheim, California, U.S.	
12	Win	11–1	Jose Felipe Garcia	TKO	1	Mar 4, 1998	Arena Coliseo, Mexico City, Mexico	
11	Win	10–1	Julian Mujica	TKO	1	Jan 24, 1998	Arena Coliseo, Mexico City, Mexico	
10	Win	9–1	Evaristo Primero	TKO	4 (6), 1:06	Oct 22, 1997	Tropicana Las Vegas, Paradise, Nevada, U.S.	
9	Win	8–1	Jose Guillermo Sanchez	TKO	3 (4)	Sep 27, 1997	Caesars Tahoe, Stateline, Nevada, U.S.	
8	Win	7–1	Gabriel Tinajero	KO	2 (6)	Jul 14, 1997	Great Western Forum, Inglewood, California, U.S.	
7	Win	6–1	Juan Mendoza	UD	6	Apr 21, 1997	Great Western Forum, Inglewood, California, U.S.	
6	Win	5–1	Oscar Zamora	KO	2	Dec 9, 1996	Great Western Forum, Inglewood, California, U.S.	
5	Win	4–1	Robert Enriquez	KO	4	Oct 28, 1996	Great Western Forum, Inglewood, California, U.S.	
4	Win	3–1	Mucio Castillo	TKO	1	May 15, 1996	Mexico City, Mexico	
3	Win	2–1	Sergio Lopez	TKO	2	Mar 27, 1996	Mexico City, Mexico	
2	Win	1–1	Jose Godinez	TKO	2	Mar 3, 1996	Mexico City, Mexico	
1	Loss	0–1	Victor Rabanales	KO	8	Sep 14, 1995	Campeche City, Mexico	

== Titles in boxing ==
=== Major world titles ===
- IBF bantamweight champion (118 lbs)
- WBC super bantamweight champion (122 lbs)

=== The Ring magazine titles ===
- The Ring super bantamweight champion (122 lbs)

=== Minor world titles ===
- IBO bantamweight champion (122 lbs)

=== Regional/International titles ===
- WBA Fedelatin bantamweight champion (118 lbs)
- WBA Fedecentro bantamweight champion (118 lbs)
- IBF-USBA bantamweight champion (118 lbs)
- WBC Silver super bantamweight champion (122 lbs)

== Outside the ring ==
He was involved in a car accident in Cuernavaca, Mexico. He was on his way to the airport in Mexico City to go to New York to receive the award for fight of the year, where he fought Israel Vázquez.

He made his appearance on Fight Night Round 2 launched in 2005.

He is Juan Manuel Marquez's brother; he also has a sister named Carmela. Their dad is a former professional boxer.

== See also ==
- List of super bantamweight boxing champions
- List of featherweight boxing champions
- List of WBC world champions
- List of Mexican boxing world champions
- List of notable boxing families
- Márquez–Vázquez rivalry

Sporting positions
Regional boxing titles
Vacant Title last held by Cuauhtemoc Gomez	WBA Fedelatin bantamweight champion December 16, 2000 – July 2001; Vacated	Vacant Title next held by Moises Castro
Vacant Title last held by Cuauhtemoc Gomez	WBA Fedecentro bantamweight champion July 6, 2001 – February 2002; Vacated	Vacant Title next held by Leopoldo Arrocha
Vacant Title last held by Pete Frissina	IBF-USBA bantamweight champion February 23, 2002 – February 15, 2003; Won world title	Vacant Title next held by Michael Angeletti
New title	WBC Silver super bantamweight champion May 22, 2010 – November 2010; Vacated	Vacant Title next held by Victor Terrazas
Minor world boxing titles
Preceded by Silence Mabuza	IBO bantamweight champion November 5, 2005 – March 2007; Vacated	Vacant Title next held by Silence Mabuza
Major world boxing titles
Preceded by Tim Austin	IBF bantamweight champion February 15, 2003 – March 16, 2007; Vacated	Vacant Title next held by Luis Alberto Pérez
Preceded by Israel Vázquez	WBC super bantamweight champion March 3, 2007 – August 4, 2007	Succeeded by Israel Vázquez
Preceded by Israel Vázquez	The Ring super bantamweight champion March 3, 2007 – August 4, 2007	Succeeded by Israel Vázquez
Preceded by Israel Vázquez	Lineal super bantamweight champion March 3, 2007 – August 4, 2007	Succeeded by Israel Vázquez
Awards
Previous: Somsak Sithchatchawal vs. Mahyar Monshipour	The Ring Fight of the Year vs. Vázquez II, III; 2007, 2008	Next: Juan Manuel Márquez vs. Juan Díaz
Previous: Somsak Sithchatchawal vs. Mahyar Monshipour	BWAA Fight of the Year vs. Vázquez III; 2008	Next: Juan Manuel Márquez vs. Juan Díaz
