= Antonio Escalante =

Mexican boxer (born 1985)

Personal information
- Nickname: Tony
- Born: June 3, 1985 (age 41) Ciudad Juárez, Chihuahua, Mexico
- Height: 1.72 m (5 ft 8 in)
- Weight: Super Featherweight; Featherweight

Boxing career
- Reach: 180 cm (71 in)
- Stance: Orthodox

Boxing record
- Total fights: 37
- Wins: 29
- Win by KO: 20
- Losses: 8
- Draws: 0
- No contests: 0

Antonio Escalante (born June 3, 1985) is a Mexican professional boxer.

== Amateur career ==
He is also a two time Golden Gloves champion.

== Professional career ==
On September 18, 2010, Escalante lost to former champion Daniel Ponce de León in a WBO World Featherweight Title Eliminator. The Fight was televised by HBO as part of the Mosley vs. Mora undercard.
