= List of The Ring pound for pound rankings (2010s) =

Boxing magazine The Ring began naming the top 10 pound for pound boxers in 1989. The first #1 pound for pound fighter was heavyweight champion Mike Tyson. To reduce the number of tables, a table is only added if there are changes in the rankings. For WBA titles, only titles in the primary champion lineage are listed.

== 2019 ==
November 16, 2019
Changes	Rank	Boxer	Record	Weight class	Title(s)
—N/a	1	Canelo Álvarez	53–1–2 (36 KO)	Middleweight Light heavyweight	WBA (Super) and The Ring WBO
—N/a	2	Vasiliy Lomachenko	14–1 (10 KO)	Lightweight	WBA (Super), WBO, and The Ring
+1	3	Naoya Inoue	19–0 (16 KO)	Bantamweight	WBA (Super), IBF, and The Ring
-1	4	Terence Crawford	36–0 (27 KO)	Welterweight	WBO
—N/a	5	Oleksandr Usyk	17–0 (13 KO)	Heavyweight	—N/a
—N/a	6	Errol Spence Jr.	26–0 (21 KO)	Welterweight	WBC and IBF
—N/a	7	Gennady Golovkin	40–1–1 (35 KO)	Middleweight	IBF
—N/a	8	Juan Francisco Estrada	41–3 (28 KO)	Super flyweight	WBC and The Ring
—N/a	9	Artur Beterbiev	15–0 (15 KO)	Light heavyweight	WBC and IBF
—N/a	10	Manny Pacquiao	62–7–2 (39 KO)	Welterweight	WBA (Super)

November 7, 2019
Changes	Rank	Boxer	Record	Weight class	Title(s)
+2	1	Canelo Álvarez	53–1–2 (36 KO)	Middleweight Light heavyweight	WBA (Super) and The Ring WBO
-1	2	Vasiliy Lomachenko	14–1 (10 KO)	Lightweight	WBA (Super), WBO, and The Ring
-1	3	Terence Crawford	35–0 (25 KO)	Welterweight	WBO
—N/a	4	Naoya Inoue	19–0 (16 KO)	Bantamweight	WBA (Super), IBF, and The Ring
—N/a	5	Oleksandr Usyk	16–0 (12 KO)	Cruiserweight	The Ring
—N/a	6	Errol Spence Jr.	26–0 (21 KO)	Welterweight	WBC and IBF
—N/a	7	Gennady Golovkin	39–1–1 (34 KO)	Middleweight	IBF
—N/a	8	Juan Francisco Estrada	40–3 (26 KO)	Super flyweight	WBC and The Ring
—N/a	9	Artur Beterbiev	15–0 (15 KO)	Light heavyweight	WBC and IBF
—N/a	10	Manny Pacquiao	62–7–2 (39 KO)	Welterweight	WBA (Super)

October 23, 2019
Changes	Rank	Boxer	Record	Weight class	Title(s)
—N/a	1	Vasiliy Lomachenko	14–1 (10 KO)	Lightweight	WBA (Super), WBO, and The Ring
—N/a	2	Terence Crawford	35–0 (25 KO)	Welterweight	WBO
—N/a	3	Canelo Álvarez	52–1–2 (35 KO)	Middleweight	WBA (Super) and The Ring
—N/a	4	Naoya Inoue	18–0 (16 KO)	Bantamweight	IBF and The Ring
—N/a	5	Oleksandr Usyk	16–0 (12 KO)	Cruiserweight	The Ring
—N/a	6	Errol Spence Jr.	26–0 (21 KO)	Welterweight	WBC and IBF
—N/a	7	Gennady Golovkin	39–1–1 (34 KO)	Middleweight	IBF
—N/a	8	Juan Francisco Estrada	40–3 (26 KO)	Super flyweight	WBC and The Ring
New	9	Artur Beterbiev	15–0 (15 KO)	Light heavyweight	WBC and IBF
—N/a	10	Manny Pacquiao	62–7–2 (39 KO)	Welterweight	WBA (Super)

July 20, 2019
Changes	Rank	Boxer	Record	Weight class	Title(s)
—N/a	1	Vasiliy Lomachenko	14–1 (10 KO)	Lightweight	WBA (Super), WBC, WBO, and The Ring
—N/a	2	Terence Crawford	35–0 (25 KO)	Welterweight	WBO
—N/a	3	Canelo Álvarez	52–1–2 (35 KO)	Middleweight	WBA (Super) and The Ring
—N/a	4	Naoya Inoue	18–0 (16 KO)	Bantamweight	IBF and The Ring
—N/a	5	Oleksandr Usyk	16–0 (12 KO)	Cruiserweight	The Ring
—N/a	6	Errol Spence Jr.	25–0 (21 KO)	Welterweight	IBF
—N/a	7	Gennady Golovkin	38–1–1 (34 KO)	Middleweight	—N/a
—N/a	8	Juan Francisco Estrada	40–3 (26 KO)	Super flyweight	WBC and The Ring
—N/a	9	Mikey Garcia	39–1 (30 KO)	Lightweight	—N/a
New	10	Manny Pacquiao	62–7–2 (39 KO)	Welterweight	WBA (Super)

May 18, 2019
Changes	Rank	Boxer	Record	Weight class	Title(s)
—N/a	1	Vasiliy Lomachenko	13–1 (10 KO)	Lightweight	WBA (Super), WBO, and The Ring
—N/a	2	Terence Crawford	35–0 (25 KO)	Welterweight	WBO
—N/a	3	Canelo Álvarez	52–1–2 (35 KO)	Middleweight	WBA (Super), WBC, IBF, and The Ring
+3	4	Naoya Inoue	18–0 (16 KO)	Bantamweight	IBF and The Ring
-1	5	Oleksandr Usyk	16–0 (12 KO)	Cruiserweight	WBC, IBF, WBO, and The Ring
-1	6	Errol Spence Jr.	25–0 (21 KO)	Welterweight	IBF
-1	7	Gennady Golovkin	38–1–1 (34 KO)	Middleweight	—N/a
—N/a	8	Juan Francisco Estrada	39–3 (26 KO)	Super flyweight	WBC and The Ring
—N/a	9	Mikey Garcia	39–1 (30 KO)	Lightweight	—N/a
—N/a	10	Donnie Nietes	42–1–5 (23 KO)	Super flyweight	—N/a

April 27, 2019
Changes	Rank	Boxer	Record	Weight class	Title(s)
—N/a	1	Vasiliy Lomachenko	13–1 (10 KO)	Lightweight	WBA (Super), WBO, and The Ring
—N/a	2	Terence Crawford	35–0 (25 KO)	Welterweight	WBO
—N/a	3	Canelo Álvarez	52–1–2 (35 KO)	Middleweight	WBA (Super), WBC, IBF, and The Ring
—N/a	4	Oleksandr Usyk	16–0 (12 KO)	Cruiserweight	WBC, IBF, WBO, and The Ring
—N/a	5	Errol Spence Jr.	25–0 (21 KO)	Welterweight	IBF
—N/a	6	Gennady Golovkin	38–1–1 (34 KO)	Middleweight	—N/a
—N/a	7	Naoya Inoue	17–0 (16 KO)	Bantamweight	—N/a
New	8	Juan Francisco Estrada	39–3 (26 KO)	Super flyweight	WBC and The Ring
—N/a	9	Mikey Garcia	39–1 (30 KO)	Lightweight	—N/a
—N/a	10	Donnie Nietes	42–1–5 (23 KO)	Super flyweight	—N/a

March 16, 2019
Changes	Rank	Boxer	Record	Weight class	Title(s)
—N/a	1	Vasiliy Lomachenko	12–1 (9 KO)	Lightweight	WBA (Super), WBO, and The Ring
—N/a	2	Terence Crawford	34–0 (25 KO)	Welterweight	WBO
—N/a	3	Canelo Álvarez	51–1–2 (35 KO)	Middleweight	WBA (Super), WBC, and The Ring
—N/a	4	Oleksandr Usyk	16–0 (12 KO)	Cruiserweight	WBA, WBC, IBF, WBO, and The Ring
+5	5	Errol Spence Jr.	25–0 (21 KO)	Welterweight	IBF
-1	6	Gennady Golovkin	38–1–1 (34 KO)	Middleweight	—N/a
-1	7	Naoya Inoue	17–0 (15 KO)	Bantamweight	—N/a
—N/a	8	Srisaket Sor Rungvisai	47–4–1 (41 KO)	Super flyweight	WBC and The Ring
-2	9	Mikey Garcia	39–1 (30 KO)	Lightweight	WBC
-1	10	Donnie Nietes	42–1–5 (23 KO)	Super flyweight	—N/a

January 14, 2019
Changes	Rank	Boxer	Record	Weight class	Title(s)
—N/a	1	Vasiliy Lomachenko	12–1 (9 KO)	Lightweight	WBA (Super), WBO, and The Ring
—N/a	2	Terence Crawford	34–0 (25 KO)	Welterweight	WBO
—N/a	3	Canelo Álvarez	51–1–2 (35 KO)	Middleweight	WBA (Super), WBC, and The Ring
—N/a	4	Oleksandr Usyk	16–0 (12 KO)	Cruiserweight	WBA, WBC, IBF, WBO, and The Ring
—N/a	5	Gennady Golovkin	38–1–1 (34 KO)	Middleweight	—N/a
—N/a	6	Naoya Inoue	17–0 (15 KO)	Bantamweight	—N/a
—N/a	7	Mikey Garcia	39–0 (30 KO)	Lightweight	WBC
—N/a	8	Srisaket Sor Rungvisai	47–4–1 (41 KO)	Super flyweight	WBC and The Ring
+1	9	Donnie Nietes	42–1–5 (23 KO)	Super flyweight	WBO
-1	10	Errol Spence Jr.	24–0 (21 KO)	Welterweight	IBF

== 2018 ==
November 11, 2018
Changes	Rank	Boxer	Record	Weight class	Title(s)
—N/a	1	Vasiliy Lomachenko	11–1 (9 KO)	Lightweight	WBA (Super) and The Ring
—N/a	2	Terence Crawford	33–0 (24 KO)	Welterweight	WBO
—N/a	3	Canelo Álvarez	50–1–2 (34 KO)	Middleweight	WBA (Super), WBC, and The Ring
+1	4	Oleksandr Usyk	16–0 (12 KO)	Cruiserweight	WBA, WBC, IBF, WBO, and The Ring
-1	5	Gennady Golovkin	38–1–1 (34 KO)	Middleweight	—N/a
—N/a	6	Naoya Inoue	17–0 (15 KO)	Bantamweight	—N/a
—N/a	7	Mikey Garcia	39–0 (30 KO)	Lightweight	WBC
—N/a	8	Srisaket Sor Rungvisai	47–4–1 (41 KO)	Super flyweight	WBC and The Ring
—N/a	9	Errol Spence Jr.	24–0 (21 KO)	Welterweight	IBF
—N/a	10	Donnie Nietes	41–1–5 (23 KO)	Super flyweight	—N/a

October 7, 2018
Changes	Rank	Boxer	Record	Weight class	Title(s)
—N/a	1	Vasiliy Lomachenko	11–1 (9 KO)	Lightweight	WBA (Super) and The Ring
—N/a	2	Terence Crawford	33–0 (24 KO)	Welterweight	WBO
—N/a	3	Canelo Álvarez	50–1–2 (34 KO)	Middleweight	WBA (Super), WBC, and The Ring
—N/a	4	Gennady Golovkin	38–1–1 (34 KO)	Middleweight	—N/a
—N/a	5	Oleksandr Usyk	15–0 (11 KO)	Cruiserweight	WBA, WBC, IBF, WBO, and The Ring
+1	6	Naoya Inoue	17–0 (15 KO)	Bantamweight	—N/a
-1	7	Mikey Garcia	39–0 (30 KO)	Lightweight	WBC and IBF
—N/a	8	Srisaket Sor Rungvisai	47–4–1 (41 KO)	Super flyweight	WBC and The Ring
—N/a	9	Errol Spence Jr.	24–0 (21 KO)	Welterweight	IBF
—N/a	10	Donnie Nietes	41–1–5 (23 KO)	Super flyweight	—N/a

September 18, 2018
Changes	Rank	Boxer	Record	Weight class	Title(s)
+2	1	Vasiliy Lomachenko	11–1 (9 KO)	Lightweight	WBA (Super) and The Ring
—N/a	2	Terence Crawford	33–0 (24 KO)	Welterweight	WBO
New	3	Canelo Álvarez	50–1–2 (34 KO)	Middleweight	WBA (Super), WBC, and The Ring
-3	4	Gennady Golovkin	38–1–1 (34 KO)	Middleweight	—N/a
-1	5	Oleksandr Usyk	15–0 (11 KO)	Cruiserweight	WBA, WBC, IBF, WBO, and The Ring
-1	6	Mikey Garcia	39–0 (30 KO)	Lightweight	WBC and IBF
-1	7	Naoya Inoue	16–0 (14 KO)	Bantamweight	—N/a
-1	8	Srisaket Sor Rungvisai	46–4–1 (41 KO)	Super flyweight	WBC and The Ring
-1	9	Errol Spence Jr.	24–0 (21 KO)	Welterweight	IBF
-1	10	Donnie Nietes	41–1–5 (23 KO)	Super flyweight	—N/a

August 8, 2018
Changes	Rank	Boxer	Record	Weight class	Title(s)
—N/a	1	Gennady Golovkin	38–0–1 (34 KO)	Middleweight	WBA (Super) and WBC
—N/a	2	Vasiliy Lomachenko	11–1 (9 KO)	Lightweight	WBA (Super) and The Ring
—N/a	3	Terence Crawford	33–0 (24 KO)	Welterweight	WBO
—N/a	4	Oleksandr Usyk	15–0 (11 KO)	Cruiserweight	WBA, WBC, IBF, WBO, and The Ring
—N/a	5	Mikey Garcia	39–0 (30 KO)	Lightweight	WBC and IBF
—N/a	6	Naoya Inoue	16–0 (14 KO)	Bantamweight	—N/a
—N/a	7	Srisaket Sor Rungvisai	46–4–1 (41 KO)	Super flyweight	WBC and The Ring
—N/a	8	Errol Spence Jr.	24–0 (21 KO)	Welterweight	IBF
+1	9	Donnie Nietes	41–1–4 (23 KO)	Flyweight	—N/a
New	10	Léo Santa Cruz	35–1–1 (19 KO)	Featherweight	WBA (Super)

July 23, 2018
Changes	Rank	Boxer	Record	Weight class	Title(s)
—N/a	1	Gennady Golovkin	38–0–1 (34 KO)	Middleweight	WBA (Super) and WBC
—N/a	2	Vasiliy Lomachenko	11–1 (9 KO)	Lightweight	WBA (Super) and The Ring
—N/a	3	Terence Crawford	33–0 (24 KO)	Welterweight	WBO
+6	4	Oleksandr Usyk	15–0 (11 KO)	Cruiserweight	WBA, WBC, IBF, WBO, and The Ring
-1	5	Mikey Garcia	38–0 (30 KO)	Lightweight	WBC
-1	6	Naoya Inoue	16–0 (14 KO)	Bantamweight	—N/a
-1	7	Srisaket Sor Rungvisai	46–4–1 (41 KO)	Super flyweight	WBC and The Ring
-1	8	Errol Spence Jr.	24–0 (21 KO)	Welterweight	IBF
-1	9	Sergey Kovalev	32–2–1 (28 KO)	Light heavyweight	WBO
-1	10	Donnie Nietes	41–1–4 (23 KO)	Flyweight	—N/a

June 12, 2018
Changes	Rank	Boxer	Record	Weight class	Title(s)
—N/a	1	Gennady Golovkin	38–0–1 (34 KO)	Middleweight	WBA (Super) and WBC
—N/a	2	Vasiliy Lomachenko	11–1 (9 KO)	Lightweight	WBA (Super) and The Ring
—N/a	3	Terence Crawford	33–0 (24 KO)	Welterweight	WBO
+1	4	Mikey Garcia	38–0 (30 KO)	Lightweight	WBC
+1	5	Naoya Inoue	16–0 (14 KO)	Bantamweight	—N/a
+1	6	Srisaket Sor Rungvisai	45–4–1 (40 KO)	Super flyweight	WBC and The Ring
+1	7	Errol Spence Jr.	23–0 (20 KO)	Welterweight	IBF
+1	8	Sergey Kovalev	32–2–1 (28 KO)	Light heavyweight	WBO
New	9	Donnie Nietes	41–1–4 (23 KO)	Flyweight	—N/a
New	10	Oleksandr Usyk	14–0 (11 KO)	Cruiserweight	WBC and WBO

May 15, 2018
Changes	Rank	Boxer	Record	Weight class	Title(s)
—N/a	1	Gennady Golovkin	38–0–1 (34 KO)	Middleweight	WBA (Super), WBC, and IBF
+1	2	Vasiliy Lomachenko	11–1 (9 KO)	Lightweight	WBA (Super) and The Ring
-1	3	Terence Crawford	32–0 (23 KO)	Light welterweight	—N/a
—N/a	4	Canelo Álvarez	49–1–2 (34 KO)	Middleweight	The Ring
—N/a	5	Mikey Garcia	38–0 (30 KO)	Lightweight	WBC
+1	6	Naoya Inoue	16–0 (14 KO)	Bantamweight	—N/a
-1	7	Srisaket Sor Rungvisai	45–4–1 (40 KO)	Super flyweight	WBC and The Ring
—N/a	8	Errol Spence Jr.	23–0 (20 KO)	Welterweight	IBF
—N/a	9	Sergey Kovalev	32–2–1 (28 KO)	Light heavyweight	WBO
—N/a	10	Guillermo Rigondeaux	17–1 (10 KO)	Super bantamweight	—N/a

March 4, 2018
Changes	Rank	Boxer	Record	Weight class	Title(s)
—N/a	1	Gennady Golovkin	37–0–1 (33 KO)	Middleweight	WBA (Super), WBC, and IBF
—N/a	2	Terence Crawford	32–0 (23 KO)	Light welterweight	—N/a
—N/a	3	Vasiliy Lomachenko	10–1 (8 KO)	Super featherweight	WBO
+1	4	Canelo Álvarez	49–1–2 (34 KO)	Middleweight	The Ring
+1	5	Mikey Garcia	37–0 (30 KO)	Lightweight	WBC
+1	6	Srisaket Sor Rungvisai	45–4–1 (40 KO)	Super flyweight	WBC and The Ring
+1	7	Naoya Inoue	15–0 (13 KO)	Super flyweight	WBO
+1	8	Errol Spence Jr.	22–0 (19 KO)	Welterweight	IBF
-5	9	Sergey Kovalev	32–2–1 (28 KO)	Light heavyweight	WBO
—N/a	10	Guillermo Rigondeaux	17–1 (10 KO)	Super bantamweight	—N/a

February 25, 2018
Changes	Rank	Boxer	Record	Weight class	Title(s)
—N/a	1	Gennady Golovkin	37–0–1 (33 KO)	Middleweight	WBA (Super), WBC, and IBF
—N/a	2	Terence Crawford	32–0 (23 KO)	Light welterweight	—N/a
—N/a	3	Vasiliy Lomachenko	10–1 (8 KO)	Super featherweight	WBO
—N/a	4	Sergey Kovalev	31–2–1 (27 KO)	Light heavyweight	WBO
—N/a	5	Canelo Álvarez	49–1–2 (34 KO)	Middleweight	The Ring
—N/a	6	Mikey Garcia	37–0 (30 KO)	Lightweight	WBC
+3	7	Srisaket Sor Rungvisai	45–4–1 (40 KO)	Super flyweight	WBC and The Ring
-1	8	Naoya Inoue	14–0 (12 KO)	Super flyweight	WBO
-1	9	Errol Spence Jr.	22–0 (19 KO)	Welterweight	IBF
-1	10	Guillermo Rigondeaux	17–1 (10 KO)	Super bantamweight	—N/a

== 2017 ==
December 13, 2017
Changes	Rank	Boxer	Record	Weight class	Title(s)
—N/a	1	Gennady Golovkin	37–0–1 (33 KO)	Middleweight	WBA (Super), WBC, and IBF
—N/a	2	Terence Crawford	32–0 (23 KO)	Light welterweight	WBC and The Ring
—N/a	3	Vasiliy Lomachenko	10–1 (8 KO)	Super featherweight	WBO
+1	4	Sergey Kovalev	31–2–1 (27 KO)	Light heavyweight	WBO
+1	5	Canelo Álvarez	49–1–2 (34 KO)	Middleweight	The Ring
+1	6	Mikey Garcia	37–0 (30 KO)	Lightweight	WBC
+1	7	Naoya Inoue	14–0 (12 KO)	Super flyweight	WBO
+1	8	Errol Spence Jr.	22–0 (19 KO)	Welterweight	IBF
-5	9	Guillermo Rigondeaux	17–1 (10 KO)	Super bantamweight	—N/a
—N/a	10	Srisaket Sor Rungvisai	44–4–1 (40 KO)	Super flyweight	WBC

September 26, 2017
Changes	Rank	Boxer	Record	Weight class	Title(s)
+1	1	Gennady Golovkin	37–0–1 (33 KO)	Middleweight	WBA (Super), WBC, and IBF
+1	2	Terence Crawford	32–0 (23 KO)	Light welterweight	WBA (Super), WBC, WBO, and The Ring
+1	3	Vasiliy Lomachenko	9–1 (7 KO)	Super featherweight	WBO
+1	4	Guillermo Rigondeaux	17–0 (10 KO)	Super bantamweight	WBA (Super)
+1	5	Sergey Kovalev	30–2–1 (26 KO)	Light heavyweight	—N/a
+1	6	Canelo Álvarez	49–1–2 (34 KO)	Middleweight	The Ring
+1	7	Mikey Garcia	37–0 (30 KO)	Lightweight	WBC
+1	8	Naoya Inoue	14–0 (12 KO)	Super flyweight	WBO
+1	9	Errol Spence Jr.	22–0 (19 KO)	Welterweight	IBF
New	10	Srisaket Sor Rungvisai	44–4–1 (40 KO)	Super flyweight	WBC

September 12, 2017
Changes	Rank	Boxer	Record	Weight class	Title(s)
—N/a	1	Andre Ward	32–0 (16 KO)	Light heavyweight	WBA (Undisputed), IBF, WBO, and The Ring
—N/a	2	Gennady Golovkin	37–0 (33 KO)	Middleweight	WBA (Super), WBC, and IBF
+1	3	Terence Crawford	32–0 (23 KO)	Light welterweight	WBA (Super), WBC, WBO, and The Ring
+1	4	Vasiliy Lomachenko	9–1 (7 KO)	Super featherweight	WBO
+1	5	Guillermo Rigondeaux	17–0 (10 KO)	Super bantamweight	WBA (Super)
+1	6	Sergey Kovalev	30–2–1 (26 KO)	Light heavyweight	—N/a
+1	7	Canelo Álvarez	49–1–1 (34 KO)	Middleweight	The Ring
+1	8	Mikey Garcia	37–0 (30 KO)	Lightweight	WBC
+1	9	Naoya Inoue	14–0 (12 KO)	Super flyweight	WBO
New	10	Errol Spence Jr.	22–0 (19 KO)	Welterweight	IBF

August 3, 2017
Changes	Rank	Boxer	Record	Weight class	Title(s)
—N/a	1	Andre Ward	32–0 (16 KO)	Light heavyweight	WBA (Undisputed), IBF, WBO, and The Ring
—N/a	2	Gennady Golovkin	37–0 (33 KO)	Middleweight	WBA (Super), WBC, and IBF
+1	3	Terence Crawford	32–0 (23 KO)	Light welterweight	WBA (Super), WBC, IBF, WBO, and The Ring
-1	4	Román González	46–1 (38 KO)	Super flyweight	—N/a
—N/a	5	Vasiliy Lomachenko	9–1 (7 KO)	Super featherweight	WBO
—N/a	6	Guillermo Rigondeaux	17–0 (10 KO)	Super bantamweight	WBA (Super)
—N/a	7	Sergey Kovalev	30–2–1 (26 KO)	Light heavyweight	—N/a
—N/a	8	Canelo Álvarez	49–1–1 (34 KO)	Middleweight	The Ring
New	9	Mikey Garcia	37–0 (30 KO)	Lightweight	WBC
—N/a	10	Naoya Inoue	13–0 (11 KO)	Super flyweight	WBO

June 19, 2017
Changes	Rank	Boxer	Record	Weight class	Title(s)
—N/a	1	Andre Ward	32–0 (16 KO)	Light heavyweight	WBA (Undisputed), IBF, WBO, and The Ring
+1	2	Gennady Golovkin	37–0 (33 KO)	Middleweight	WBA (Super), WBC, and IBF
+1	3	Román González	46–1 (38 KO)	Super flyweight	—N/a
+1	4	Terence Crawford	31–0 (22 KO)	Light welterweight	WBC, WBO, and The Ring
+1	5	Vasiliy Lomachenko	8–1 (6 KO)	Super featherweight	WBO
+1	6	Guillermo Rigondeaux	17–0 (10 KO)	Super bantamweight	WBA (Super)
-5	7	Sergey Kovalev	30–2–1 (26 KO)	Light heavyweight	—N/a
—N/a	8	Canelo Álvarez	49–1–1 (34 KO)	Middleweight	The Ring
—N/a	9	Shinsuke Yamanaka	27–0–2 (17 KO)	Bantamweight	WBC and The Ring
—N/a	10	Naoya Inoue	13–0 (11 KO)	Super flyweight	WBO

March 21, 2017
Changes	Rank	Boxer	Record	Weight class	Title(s)
+1	1	Andre Ward	31–0 (15 KO)	Light heavyweight	WBA (Undisputed), IBF, and WBO
+1	2	Sergey Kovalev	30–1–1 (26 KO)	Light heavyweight	—N/a
+1	3	Gennady Golovkin	37–0 (33 KO)	Middleweight	WBA (Super), WBC, and IBF
-3	4	Román González	46–1 (38 KO)	Super flyweight	—N/a
—N/a	5	Terence Crawford	30–0 (21 KO)	Light welterweight	WBC, WBO, and The Ring
—N/a	6	Vasiliy Lomachenko	7–1 (5 KO)	Super featherweight	WBO
—N/a	7	Guillermo Rigondeaux	17–0 (10 KO)	Super bantamweight	WBA (Super)
—N/a	8	Canelo Álvarez	48–1–1 (34 KO)	Light middleweight Middleweight	WBO The Ring
—N/a	9	Shinsuke Yamanaka	27–0–2 (17 KO)	Bantamweight	WBC and The Ring
—N/a	10	Naoya Inoue	12–0 (10 KO)	Super flyweight	WBO

February 1, 2017
Changes	Rank	Boxer	Record	Weight class	Title(s)
—N/a	1	Román González	46–0 (38 KO)	Super flyweight	WBC
—N/a	2	Andre Ward	31–0 (15 KO)	Light heavyweight	WBA (Undisputed), IBF, and WBO
—N/a	3	Sergey Kovalev	30–1–1 (26 KO)	Light heavyweight	—N/a
—N/a	4	Gennady Golovkin	36–0 (33 KO)	Middleweight	WBA (Super), WBC, and IBF
—N/a	5	Terence Crawford	30–0 (21 KO)	Light welterweight	WBC, WBO, and The Ring
—N/a	6	Vasiliy Lomachenko	7–1 (5 KO)	Super featherweight	WBO
—N/a	7	Guillermo Rigondeaux	17–0 (10 KO)	Super bantamweight	WBA (Super)
—N/a	8	Canelo Álvarez	48–1–1 (34 KO)	Light middleweight Middleweight	WBO The Ring
—N/a	9	Shinsuke Yamanaka	26–0–2 (17 KO)	Bantamweight	WBC and The Ring
New	10	Naoya Inoue	12–0 (10 KO)	Super flyweight	WBO

== 2016 ==
November 29, 2016
Changes	Rank	Boxer	Record	Weight class	Title(s)
—N/a	1	Román González	46–0 (38 KO)	Super flyweight	WBC
—N/a	2	Andre Ward	31–0 (15 KO)	Light heavyweight	WBA (Undisputed), IBF, and WBO
—N/a	3	Sergey Kovalev	30–1–1 (26 KO)	Light heavyweight	—N/a
—N/a	4	Gennady Golovkin	36–0 (33 KO)	Middleweight	WBA (Super), WBC, and IBF
—N/a	5	Terence Crawford	29–0 (20 KO)	Light welterweight	WBC, WBO, and The Ring
+1	6	Vasiliy Lomachenko	7–1 (5 KO)	Super featherweight	WBO
-1	7	Guillermo Rigondeaux	17–0 (10 KO)	Super bantamweight	WBA (Super)
—N/a	8	Canelo Álvarez	48–1–1 (34 KO)	Light middleweight Middleweight	WBO The Ring
—N/a	9	Shinsuke Yamanaka	26–0–2 (17 KO)	Bantamweight	WBC and The Ring
—N/a	10	Carl Frampton	23–0 (14 KO)	Featherweight	WBA (Super)

November 21, 2016
Changes	Rank	Boxer	Record	Weight class	Title(s)
—N/a	1	Román González	46–0 (38 KO)	Super flyweight	WBC
+2	2	Andre Ward	31–0 (15 KO)	Light heavyweight	WBA (Undisputed), IBF, and WBO
-1	3	Sergey Kovalev	30–1–1 (26 KO)	Light heavyweight	—N/a
-1	4	Gennady Golovkin	36–0 (33 KO)	Middleweight	WBA (Super), WBC, and IBF
—N/a	5	Terence Crawford	29–0 (20 KO)	Light welterweight	WBC, WBO, and The Ring
—N/a	6	Guillermo Rigondeaux	17–0 (10 KO)	Super bantamweight	WBA (Super)
—N/a	7	Vasiliy Lomachenko	6–1 (4 KO)	Super featherweight	WBO
—N/a	8	Canelo Álvarez	48–1–1 (34 KO)	Light middleweight Middleweight	WBO The Ring
—N/a	9	Shinsuke Yamanaka	26–0–2 (17 KO)	Bantamweight	WBC and The Ring
—N/a	10	Carl Frampton	23–0 (14 KO)	Featherweight	WBA (Super)

August 3, 2016
Changes	Rank	Boxer	Record	Weight class	Title(s)
—N/a	1	Román González	45–0 (38 KO)	Flyweight	WBC and The Ring
—N/a	2	Sergey Kovalev	30–0–1 (26 KO)	Light heavyweight	WBA (Undisputed), IBF, and WBO
—N/a	3	Gennady Golovkin	35–0 (32 KO)	Middleweight	WBA (Super), WBC, and IBF
—N/a	4	Andre Ward	29–0 (15 KO)	Light heavyweight	—N/a
—N/a	5	Terence Crawford	29–0 (20 KO)	Light welterweight	WBC, WBO, and The Ring
—N/a	6	Guillermo Rigondeaux	17–0 (10 KO)	Super bantamweight	WBA (Super)
—N/a	7	Vasiliy Lomachenko	6–1 (4 KO)	Super featherweight	WBO
—N/a	8	Canelo Álvarez	47–1–1 (33 KO)	Middleweight	The Ring
—N/a	9	Shinsuke Yamanaka	25–0–2 (17 KO)	Bantamweight	WBC
New	10	Carl Frampton	23–0 (14 KO)	Featherweight	WBA (Super)

July 26, 2016
Changes	Rank	Boxer	Record	Weight class	Title(s)
—N/a	1	Román González	45–0 (38 KO)	Flyweight	WBC and The Ring
—N/a	2	Sergey Kovalev	30–0–1 (26 KO)	Light heavyweight	WBA (Undisputed), IBF, and WBO
—N/a	3	Gennady Golovkin	35–0 (32 KO)	Middleweight	WBA (Super), WBC, and IBF
—N/a	4	Andre Ward	29–0 (15 KO)	Light heavyweight	—N/a
+1	5	Terence Crawford	29–0 (20 KO)	Light welterweight	WBC, WBO, and The Ring
-1	6	Guillermo Rigondeaux	16–0 (10 KO)	Super bantamweight	WBA (Super)
—N/a	7	Vasiliy Lomachenko	6–1 (4 KO)	Super featherweight	WBO
—N/a	8	Canelo Álvarez	47–1–1 (33 KO)	Middleweight	WBC and The Ring
—N/a	9	Shinsuke Yamanaka	25–0–2 (17 KO)	Bantamweight	WBC
—N/a	10	Naoya Inoue	10–0 (8 KO)	Super flyweight	WBO

June 13, 2016
Changes	Rank	Boxer	Record	Weight class	Title(s)
—N/a	1	Román González	45–0 (38 KO)	Flyweight	WBC and The Ring
—N/a	2	Sergey Kovalev	29–0–1 (26 KO)	Light heavyweight	WBA (Undisputed), IBF, and WBO
—N/a	3	Gennady Golovkin	35–0 (32 KO)	Middleweight	WBA (Super), WBC, and IBF
—N/a	4	Andre Ward	29–0 (15 KO)	Light heavyweight	—N/a
—N/a	5	Guillermo Rigondeaux	16–0 (10 KO)	Super bantamweight	WBA (Super)
—N/a	6	Terence Crawford	28–0 (20 KO)	Light welterweight	WBO
New	7	Vasiliy Lomachenko	6–1 (4 KO)	Super featherweight	WBO
-1	8	Canelo Álvarez	47–1–1 (33 KO)	Middleweight	The Ring
-1	9	Shinsuke Yamanaka	25–0–2 (17 KO)	Bantamweight	WBC
-1	10	Naoya Inoue	10–0 (8 KO)	Super flyweight	WBO

April 12, 2016
Changes	Rank	Boxer	Record	Weight class	Title(s)
—N/a	1	Román González	44–0 (38 KO)	Flyweight	WBC and The Ring
—N/a	2	Sergey Kovalev	29–0–1 (26 KO)	Light heavyweight	WBA (Undisputed), IBF, and WBO
—N/a	3	Gennady Golovkin	34–0 (31 KO)	Middleweight	WBA (Super) and IBF
—N/a	4	Andre Ward	29–0 (15 KO)	Light heavyweight	—N/a
—N/a	5	Guillermo Rigondeaux	16–0 (10 KO)	Super bantamweight	—N/a
—N/a	6	Terence Crawford	28–0 (20 KO)	Light welterweight	WBO
+1	7	Canelo Álvarez	46–1–1 (32 KO)	Middleweight	WBC and The Ring
+2	8	Shinsuke Yamanaka	25–0–2 (17 KO)	Bantamweight	WBC
New	9	Naoya Inoue	9–0 (8 KO)	Super flyweight	WBO
New	10	Kell Brook	36–0 (25 KO)	Welterweight	IBF

March 9, 2016
Changes	Rank	Boxer	Record	Weight class	Title(s)
—N/a	1	Román González	44–0 (38 KO)	Flyweight	WBC and The Ring
—N/a	2	Sergey Kovalev	29–0–1 (25 KO)	Light heavyweight	WBA (Undisputed), IBF, and WBO
—N/a	3	Gennady Golovkin	34–0 (31 KO)	Middleweight	WBA (Super) and IBF
—N/a	4	Andre Ward	28–0 (15 KO)	Light heavyweight	—N/a
—N/a	5	Guillermo Rigondeaux	16–0 (10 KO)	Super bantamweight	The Ring
—N/a	6	Terence Crawford	27–0 (19 KO)	Light welterweight	WBO
—N/a	7	Manny Pacquiao	57–6–2 (38 KO)	Welterweight	—N/a
—N/a	8	Canelo Álvarez	46–1–1 (32 KO)	Middleweight	WBC and The Ring
+1	9	Timothy Bradley	33–1–1 (13 KO)	Welterweight	WBO
-1	10	Shinsuke Yamanaka	25–0–2 (17 KO)	Bantamweight	WBC

== 2015 ==
November 30, 2015
Changes	Rank	Boxer	Record	Weight class	Title(s)
—N/a	1	Román González	44–0 (38 KO)	Flyweight	WBC and The Ring
—N/a	2	Sergey Kovalev	28–0–1 (25 KO)	Light heavyweight	WBA (Undisputed), IBF, and WBO
—N/a	3	Gennady Golovkin	34–0 (31 KO)	Middleweight	WBA (Super) and IBF
—N/a	4	Andre Ward	28–0 (15 KO)	Light heavyweight	—N/a
—N/a	5	Guillermo Rigondeaux	16–0 (10 KO)	Super bantamweight	The Ring
+1	6	Terence Crawford	27–0 (19 KO)	Light welterweight	WBO
+1	7	Manny Pacquiao	57–6–2 (38 KO)	Welterweight	—N/a
+1	8	Canelo Álvarez	46–1–1 (32 KO)	Middleweight	WBC and The Ring
+1	9	Shinsuke Yamanaka	24–0–2 (17 KO)	Bantamweight	WBC
New	10	Timothy Bradley	33–1–1 (13 KO)	Welterweight	WBO

November 23, 2015
Changes	Rank	Boxer	Record	Weight class	Title(s)
—N/a	1	Román González	44–0 (38 KO)	Flyweight	WBC and The Ring
—N/a	2	Sergey Kovalev	28–0–1 (25 KO)	Light heavyweight	WBA (Undisputed), IBF, and WBO
—N/a	3	Gennady Golovkin	34–0 (31 KO)	Middleweight	WBA (Super) and IBF
—N/a	4	Andre Ward	28–0 (15 KO)	Light heavyweight	—N/a
—N/a	5	Guillermo Rigondeaux	16–0 (10 KO)	Super bantamweight	The Ring
—N/a	6	Wladimir Klitschko	64–3 (53 KO)	Heavyweight	WBA (Super), IBF, WBO, and The Ring
—N/a	7	Terence Crawford	27–0 (19 KO)	Light welterweight	WBO
—N/a	8	Manny Pacquiao	57–6–2 (38 KO)	Welterweight	—N/a
New	9	Canelo Álvarez	46–1–1 (32 KO)	Middleweight	WBC and The Ring
-1	10	Shinsuke Yamanaka	24–0–2 (17 KO)	Bantamweight	WBC

November 2, 2015
Changes	Rank	Boxer	Record	Weight class	Title(s)
—N/a	1	Román González	44–0 (38 KO)	Flyweight	WBC and The Ring
+1	2	Sergey Kovalev	28–0–1 (25 KO)	Light heavyweight	WBA (Undisputed), IBF, and WBO
+1	3	Gennady Golovkin	34–0 (31 KO)	Middleweight	WBA (Super) and IBF
-2	4	Andre Ward	28–0 (15 KO)	Light heavyweight	—N/a
—N/a	5	Guillermo Rigondeaux	15–0 (10 KO)	Super bantamweight	The Ring
—N/a	6	Wladimir Klitschko	64–3 (53 KO)	Heavyweight	WBA (Super), IBF, WBO, and The Ring
—N/a	7	Terence Crawford	27–0 (19 KO)	Light welterweight	WBO
—N/a	8	Manny Pacquiao	57–6–2 (38 KO)	Welterweight	—N/a
—N/a	9	Shinsuke Yamanaka	24–0–2 (17 KO)	Bantamweight	WBC
—N/a	10	Kell Brook	35–0 (24 KO)	Welterweight	IBF

September 15, 2015
Changes	Rank	Boxer	Record	Weight class	Title(s)
+1	1	Román González	43–0 (37 KO)	Flyweight	WBC and The Ring
New	2	Andre Ward	28–0 (15 KO)	Light heavyweight	—N/a
+4	3	Sergey Kovalev	28–0–1 (25 KO)	Light heavyweight	WBA (Undisputed), IBF, and WBO
—N/a	4	Gennady Golovkin	33–0 (30 KO)	Middleweight	WBA (Super)
—N/a	5	Guillermo Rigondeaux	15–0 (10 KO)	Super bantamweight	WBA (Super), WBO, and The Ring
-3	6	Wladimir Klitschko	64–3 (53 KO)	Heavyweight	WBA (Super), IBF, WBO, and The Ring
+1	7	Terence Crawford	26–0 (18 KO)	Light welterweight	WBO
-2	8	Manny Pacquiao	57–6–2 (38 KO)	Welterweight	—N/a
—N/a	9	Shinsuke Yamanaka	24–0–2 (17 KO)	Bantamweight	WBC
New	10	Kell Brook	35–0 (24 KO)	Welterweight	IBF

June 9, 2015
Changes	Rank	Boxer	Record	Weight class	Title(s)
—N/a	1	Floyd Mayweather Jr.	48–0 (26 KO)	Welterweight Light middleweight	WBA (Unified), WBC, WBO, and The Ring WBA (Super), WBC, and The Ring
—N/a	2	Román González	43–0 (37 KO)	Flyweight	WBC and The Ring
—N/a	3	Wladimir Klitschko	64–3 (53 KO)	Heavyweight	WBA (Super), IBF, WBO, and The Ring
—N/a	4	Gennady Golovkin	33–0 (30 KO)	Middleweight	WBA (Super)
—N/a	5	Guillermo Rigondeaux	15–0 (10 KO)	Super bantamweight	WBA (Super), WBO, and The Ring
—N/a	6	Manny Pacquiao	57–6–2 (38 KO)	Welterweight	—N/a
+1	7	Sergey Kovalev	27–0–1 (24 KO)	Light heavyweight	WBA (Undisputed), IBF, and WBO
+1	8	Terence Crawford	26–0 (18 KO)	Light welterweight	WBO
+1	9	Shinsuke Yamanaka	23–0–2 (17 KO)	Bantamweight	WBC
New	10	Takashi Uchiyama	23–0–1 (19 KO)	Super featherweight	WBA (Super)

May 18, 2015
Changes	Rank	Boxer	Record	Weight class	Title(s)
—N/a	1	Floyd Mayweather Jr.	48–0 (26 KO)	Welterweight Light middleweight	WBA (Unified), WBC, WBO, and The Ring WBA (Super), WBC, and The Ring
+1	2	Román González	43–0 (37 KO)	Flyweight	WBC and The Ring
-1	3	Wladimir Klitschko	64–3 (53 KO)	Heavyweight	WBA (Super), IBF, WBO, and The Ring
+3	4	Gennady Golovkin	33–0 (30 KO)	Middleweight	WBA (Super)
-1	5	Guillermo Rigondeaux	15–0 (10 KO)	Super bantamweight	WBA (Super), WBO, and The Ring
-1	6	Manny Pacquiao	57–6–2 (38 KO)	Welterweight	—N/a
-1	7	Carl Froch	33–2 (24 KO)	Super middleweight	—N/a
+1	8	Sergey Kovalev	27–0–1 (24 KO)	Light heavyweight	WBA (Undisputed), IBF, and WBO
+2	9	Terence Crawford	26–0 (18 KO)	Light welterweight	WBO
New	10	Shinsuke Yamanaka	23–0–2 (17 KO)	Bantamweight	WBC

May 4, 2015
Changes	Rank	Boxer	Record	Weight class	Title(s)
—N/a	1	Floyd Mayweather Jr.	48–0 (26 KO)	Welterweight Light middleweight	WBA (Unified), WBC, WBO, and The Ring WBA (Super), WBC, and The Ring
—N/a	2	Wladimir Klitschko	63–3 (53 KO)	Heavyweight	WBA (Super), IBF, WBO, and The Ring
+1	3	Román González	42–0 (36 KO)	Flyweight	WBC and The Ring
+1	4	Guillermo Rigondeaux	15–0 (10 KO)	Super bantamweight	WBA (Super), WBO, and The Ring
-2	5	Manny Pacquiao	57–6–2 (38 KO)	Welterweight	—N/a
—N/a	6	Carl Froch	33–2 (24 KO)	Super middleweight	—N/a
—N/a	7	Gennady Golovkin	32–0 (29 KO)	Middleweight	WBA (Super)
—N/a	8	Sergey Kovalev	27–0–1 (24 KO)	Light heavyweight	WBA (Undisputed), IBF, and WBO
+1	9	Juan Manuel Márquez	56–7–1 (40 KO)	Welterweight	—N/a
New	10	Terence Crawford	26–0 (18 KO)	Light welterweight	WBO

April 22, 2015
Changes	Rank	Boxer	Record	Weight class	Title(s)
—N/a	1	Floyd Mayweather Jr.	47–0 (26 KO)	Welterweight Light middleweight	WBA (Unified), WBC, and The Ring WBA (Super), WBC, and The Ring
—N/a	2	Wladimir Klitschko	63–3 (53 KO)	Heavyweight	WBA (Super), IBF, WBO, and The Ring
—N/a	3	Manny Pacquiao	57–5–2 (38 KO)	Welterweight	WBO
—N/a	4	Román González	42–0 (36 KO)	Flyweight	WBC and The Ring
—N/a	5	Guillermo Rigondeaux	15–0 (10 KO)	Super bantamweight	WBA (Super), WBO, and The Ring
+2	6	Carl Froch	33–2 (24 KO)	Super middleweight	—N/a
+2	7	Gennady Golovkin	32–0 (29 KO)	Middleweight	WBA (Super)
+2	8	Sergey Kovalev	27–0–1 (24 KO)	Light heavyweight	WBA (Undisputed), IBF, and WBO
-3	9	Timothy Bradley	31–1 (12 KO)	Welterweight	—N/a
-3	10	Juan Manuel Márquez	56–7–1 (40 KO)	Welterweight	—N/a

March 16, 2015
Changes	Rank	Boxer	Record	Weight class	Title(s)
—N/a	1	Floyd Mayweather Jr.	47–0 (26 KO)	Welterweight Light middleweight	WBA (Unified), WBC, and The Ring WBA (Super), WBC, and The Ring
—N/a	2	Wladimir Klitschko	63–3 (53 KO)	Heavyweight	WBA (Super), IBF, WBO, and The Ring
—N/a	3	Manny Pacquiao	57–5–2 (38 KO)	Welterweight	WBO
—N/a	4	Román González	42–0 (36 KO)	Flyweight	WBC and The Ring
—N/a	5	Guillermo Rigondeaux	15–0 (10 KO)	Super bantamweight	WBA (Super), WBO, and The Ring
—N/a	6	Timothy Bradley	31–1 (12 KO)	Welterweight	—N/a
—N/a	7	Juan Manuel Márquez	56–7–1 (40 KO)	Welterweight	—N/a
—N/a	8	Carl Froch	33–2 (24 KO)	Super middleweight	—N/a
—N/a	9	Gennady Golovkin	32–0 (29 KO)	Middleweight	WBA (Super)
New	10	Sergey Kovalev	27–0–1 (24 KO)	Light heavyweight	WBA (Undisputed), IBF, and WBO

February 23, 2015
Changes	Rank	Boxer	Record	Weight class	Title(s)
—N/a	1	Floyd Mayweather Jr.	47–0 (26 KO)	Welterweight Light middleweight	WBA (Unified), WBC, and The Ring WBA (Super), WBC, and The Ring
—N/a	2	Wladimir Klitschko	63–3 (53 KO)	Heavyweight	WBA (Super), IBF, WBO, and The Ring
—N/a	3	Manny Pacquiao	57–5–2 (38 KO)	Welterweight	WBO
—N/a	4	Román González	41–0 (35 KO)	Flyweight	WBC and The Ring
—N/a	5	Guillermo Rigondeaux	15–0 (10 KO)	Super bantamweight	WBA (Super), WBO, and The Ring
—N/a	6	Timothy Bradley	31–1 (12 KO)	Welterweight	—N/a
—N/a	7	Juan Manuel Márquez	56–7–1 (40 KO)	Welterweight	—N/a
—N/a	8	Carl Froch	33–2 (24 KO)	Super middleweight	—N/a
+1	9	Gennady Golovkin	32–0 (29 KO)	Middleweight	WBA (Super)
-1	10	Canelo Álvarez	44–1–1 (31 KO)	Light middleweight	—N/a

February 19, 2015
Changes	Rank	Boxer	Record	Weight class	Title(s)
—N/a	1	Floyd Mayweather Jr.	47–0 (26 KO)	Welterweight Light middleweight	WBA (Unified), WBC, and The Ring WBA (Super), WBC, and The Ring
—N/a	2	Wladimir Klitschko	63–3 (53 KO)	Heavyweight	WBA (Super), IBF, WBO, and The Ring
—N/a	3	Manny Pacquiao	57–5–2 (38 KO)	Welterweight	WBO
+1	4	Román González	41–0 (35 KO)	Flyweight	WBC and The Ring
+1	5	Guillermo Rigondeaux	15–0 (10 KO)	Super bantamweight	WBA (Super), WBO, and The Ring
+1	6	Timothy Bradley	31–1 (12 KO)	Welterweight	—N/a
+1	7	Juan Manuel Márquez	56–7–1 (40 KO)	Welterweight	—N/a
+1	8	Carl Froch	33–2 (24 KO)	Super middleweight	—N/a
+1	9	Canelo Álvarez	44–1–1 (31 KO)	Light middleweight	—N/a
New	10	Gennady Golovkin	31–0 (28 KO)	Middleweight	WBA (Super)

== 2014 ==
December 19, 2014
Changes	Rank	Boxer	Record	Weight class	Title(s)
—N/a	1	Floyd Mayweather Jr.	47–0 (26 KO)	Welterweight Light middleweight	WBA (Unified), WBC, and The Ring WBA (Super), WBC, and The Ring
—N/a	2	Wladimir Klitschko	63–3 (53 KO)	Heavyweight	WBA (Super), IBF, WBO, and The Ring
—N/a	3	Manny Pacquiao	57–5–2 (38 KO)	Welterweight	WBO
—N/a	4	Andre Ward	27–0 (14 KO)	Super middleweight	WBA (Super) and The Ring
+2	5	Román González	41–0 (35 KO)	Flyweight	WBC and The Ring
+2	6	Guillermo Rigondeaux	14–0 (9 KO)	Super bantamweight	WBA (Super), WBO, and The Ring
-2	7	Timothy Bradley	31–1 (12 KO)	Welterweight	—N/a
-2	8	Juan Manuel Márquez	56–7–1 (40 KO)	Welterweight	—N/a
—N/a	9	Carl Froch	33–2 (24 KO)	Super middleweight	IBF
—N/a	10	Canelo Álvarez	44–1–1 (31 KO)	Light middleweight	—N/a

November 25, 2014
Changes	Rank	Boxer	Record	Weight class	Title(s)
—N/a	1	Floyd Mayweather Jr.	47–0 (26 KO)	Welterweight Light middleweight	WBA (Unified), WBC, and The Ring WBA (Super), WBC, and The Ring
+1	2	Wladimir Klitschko	63–3 (53 KO)	Heavyweight	WBA (Super), IBF, WBO, and The Ring
+1	3	Manny Pacquiao	57–5–2 (38 KO)	Welterweight	WBO
-2	4	Andre Ward	27–0 (14 KO)	Super middleweight	WBA (Super) and The Ring
—N/a	5	Timothy Bradley	31–1 (12 KO)	Welterweight	—N/a
—N/a	6	Juan Manuel Márquez	56–7–1 (40 KO)	Welterweight	—N/a
+2	7	Román González	41–0 (35 KO)	Flyweight	WBC and The Ring
-1	8	Guillermo Rigondeaux	14–0 (9 KO)	Super bantamweight	WBA (Super), WBO, and The Ring
-1	9	Carl Froch	33–2 (24 KO)	Super middleweight	IBF
—N/a	10	Canelo Álvarez	44–1–1 (31 KO)	Light middleweight	—N/a

June 12, 2014
Changes	Rank	Boxer	Record	Weight class	Title(s)
—N/a	1	Floyd Mayweather Jr.	46–0 (26 KO)	Welterweight Light middleweight	WBA (Unified), WBC, and The Ring WBA (Super), WBC, and The Ring
—N/a	2	Andre Ward	27–0 (14 KO)	Super middleweight	WBA (Super) and The Ring
—N/a	3	Wladimir Klitschko	62–3 (52 KO)	Heavyweight	WBA (Super), IBF, WBO, and The Ring
—N/a	4	Manny Pacquiao	56–5–2 (38 KO)	Welterweight	WBO
—N/a	5	Timothy Bradley	31–1 (12 KO)	Welterweight	—N/a
—N/a	6	Juan Manuel Márquez	56–7–1 (40 KO)	Welterweight	—N/a
+1	7	Guillermo Rigondeaux	13–0 (8 KO)	Super bantamweight	WBA (Super), WBO, and The Ring
+1	8	Carl Froch	33–2 (24 KO)	Super middleweight	IBF
New	9	Román González	39–0 (33 KO)	Flyweight	—N/a
—N/a	10	Canelo Álvarez	43–1–1 (31 KO)	Light middleweight	—N/a

June 3, 2014
Changes	Rank	Boxer	Record	Weight class	Title(s)
—N/a	1	Floyd Mayweather Jr.	46–0 (26 KO)	Welterweight Light middleweight	WBA (Unified), WBC and The Ring WBA (Super), WBC, and The Ring
—N/a	2	Andre Ward	27–0 (14 KO)	Super middleweight	WBA (Super) and The Ring
—N/a	3	Wladimir Klitschko	62–3 (52 KO)	Heavyweight	WBA (Super), IBF, WBO, and The Ring
—N/a	4	Manny Pacquiao	56–5–2 (38 KO)	Welterweight	WBO
—N/a	5	Timothy Bradley	31–1 (12 KO)	Welterweight	—N/a
—N/a	6	Juan Manuel Márquez	56–7–1 (40 KO)	Welterweight	—N/a
—N/a	7	Sergio Martínez	51–2–2 (28 KO)	Middleweight	WBC and The Ring
—N/a	8	Guillermo Rigondeaux	13–0 (8 KO)	Super bantamweight	WBA (Super), WBO, and The Ring
+1	9	Carl Froch	33–2 (24 KO)	Super middleweight	IBF
-1	10	Canelo Álvarez	43–1–1 (31 KO)	Light middleweight	—N/a

April 15, 2014
Changes	Rank	Boxer	Record	Weight class	Title(s)
—N/a	1	Floyd Mayweather Jr.	45–0 (26 KO)	Welterweight Light middleweight	WBC and The Ring WBA (Super), WBC, and The Ring
—N/a	2	Andre Ward	27–0 (14 KO)	Super middleweight	WBA (Super) and The Ring
+1	3	Wladimir Klitschko	61–3 (51 KO)	Heavyweight	WBA (Super), IBF, WBO, and The Ring
+3	4	Manny Pacquiao	56–5–2 (38 KO)	Welterweight	WBO
-2	5	Timothy Bradley	31–0 (12 KO)	Welterweight	—N/a
—N/a	6	Juan Manuel Márquez	55–7–1 (40 KO)	Welterweight	—N/a
-2	7	Sergio Martínez	51–2–2 (28 KO)	Middleweight	WBC and The Ring
—N/a	8	Guillermo Rigondeaux	13–0 (8 KO)	Super bantamweight	WBA (Super), WBO, and The Ring
—N/a	9	Canelo Álvarez	43–1–1 (31 KO)	Light middleweight	—N/a
—N/a	10	Carl Froch	32–2 (23 KO)	Super middleweight	IBF

== 2013 ==
December 19, 2013
Changes	Rank	Boxer	Record	Weight class	Title(s)
—N/a	1	Floyd Mayweather Jr.	45–0 (26 KO)	Welterweight Light middleweight	WBC and The Ring WBA (Super), WBC, and The Ring
—N/a	2	Andre Ward	27–0 (14 KO)	Super middleweight	WBA (Super) and The Ring
—N/a	3	Timothy Bradley	31–0 (12 KO)	Welterweight	WBO
—N/a	4	Wladimir Klitschko	61–3 (51 KO)	Heavyweight	WBA (Super), IBF, WBO, and The Ring
—N/a	5	Sergio Martínez	51–2–2 (28 KO)	Middleweight	WBC and The Ring
—N/a	6	Juan Manuel Márquez	55–7–1 (40 KO)	Welterweight	—N/a
—N/a	7	Manny Pacquiao	55–5–2 (38 KO)	Welterweight	—N/a
—N/a	8	Guillermo Rigondeaux	13–0 (8 KO)	Super bantamweight	WBA (Super), WBO, and The Ring
+1	9	Canelo Álvarez	42–1–1 (30 KO)	Light middleweight	—N/a
New	10	Carl Froch	32–2 (23 KO)	Super middleweight	IBF

December 10, 2013
Changes	Rank	Boxer	Record	Weight class	Title(s)
—N/a	1	Floyd Mayweather Jr.	45–0 (26 KO)	Welterweight Light middleweight	WBC and The Ring WBA (Super), WBC, and The Ring
—N/a	2	Andre Ward	27–0 (14 KO)	Super middleweight	WBA (Super) and The Ring
—N/a	3	Timothy Bradley	31–0 (12 KO)	Welterweight	WBO
—N/a	4	Wladimir Klitschko	61–3 (51 KO)	Heavyweight	WBA (Super), IBF, WBO, and The Ring
—N/a	5	Sergio Martínez	51–2–2 (28 KO)	Middleweight	WBC and The Ring
—N/a	6	Juan Manuel Márquez	55–7–1 (40 KO)	Welterweight	—N/a
—N/a	7	Manny Pacquiao	55–5–2 (38 KO)	Welterweight	—N/a
+2	8	Guillermo Rigondeaux	13–0 (8 KO)	Super bantamweight	WBA (Super), WBO, and The Ring
-1	9	Adrien Broner	27–0 (22 KO)	Lightweight Welterweight	WBC WBA
-1	10	Canelo Álvarez	42–1–1 (30 KO)	Light middleweight	—N/a

October 15, 2013
Changes	Rank	Boxer	Record	Weight class	Title(s)
—N/a	1	Floyd Mayweather Jr.	45–0 (26 KO)	Welterweight Light middleweight	WBC and The Ring WBA (Super), WBC, and The Ring
—N/a	2	Andre Ward	26–0 (14 KO)	Super middleweight	WBA (Super) and The Ring
+5	3	Timothy Bradley	31–0 (12 KO)	Welterweight	WBO
—N/a	4	Wladimir Klitschko	61–3 (51 KO)	Heavyweight	WBA (Super), IBF, WBO, and The Ring
—N/a	5	Sergio Martínez	51–2–2 (28 KO)	Middleweight	WBC and The Ring
-3	6	Juan Manuel Márquez	55–7–1 (40 KO)	Welterweight	—N/a
-1	7	Manny Pacquiao	54–5–2 (38 KO)	Welterweight	—N/a
-1	8	Adrien Broner	27–0 (22 KO)	Lightweight Welterweight	WBC WBA
—N/a	9	Canelo Álvarez	42–1–1 (30 KO)	Light middleweight	—N/a
—N/a	10	Guillermo Rigondeaux	12–0 (8 KO)	Super bantamweight	WBA (Super), WBO, and The Ring

August 30, 2013
Changes	Rank	Boxer	Record	Weight class	Title(s)
—N/a	1	Floyd Mayweather Jr.	44–0 (26 KO)	Welterweight Light middleweight	WBC and The Ring WBA (Super)
—N/a	2	Andre Ward	26–0 (14 KO)	Super middleweight	WBA (Super) and The Ring
—N/a	3	Juan Manuel Márquez	55–6–1 (40 KO)	Light welterweight	WBO
—N/a	4	Wladimir Klitschko	60–3 (51 KO)	Heavyweight	WBA (Super), IBF, WBO, and The Ring
+1	5	Sergio Martínez	51–2–2 (28 KO)	Middleweight	WBC and The Ring
+1	6	Manny Pacquiao	54–5–2 (38 KO)	Welterweight	—N/a
+1	7	Adrien Broner	27–0 (22 KO)	Lightweight Welterweight	WBC WBA
+1	8	Timothy Bradley	30–0 (12 KO)	Welterweight	WBO
+1	9	Canelo Álvarez	42–0–1 (30 KO)	Light middleweight	WBC and The Ring
New	10	Guillermo Rigondeaux	12–0 (8 KO)	Super bantamweight	WBA (Super), WBO, and The Ring

June 23, 2013
Changes	Rank	Boxer	Record	Weight class	Title(s)
—N/a	1	Floyd Mayweather Jr.	44–0 (26 KO)	Welterweight Light middleweight	WBC and The Ring WBA (Super)
—N/a	2	Andre Ward	26–0 (14 KO)	Super middleweight	WBA (Super) and The Ring
—N/a	3	Juan Manuel Márquez	55–6–1 (40 KO)	Light welterweight	WBO
—N/a	4	Wladimir Klitschko	60–3 (51 KO)	Heavyweight	WBA (Super), IBF, WBO, and The Ring
—N/a	5	Abner Mares	26–0–1 (14 KO)	Featherweight	WBC
+1	6	Sergio Martínez	51–2–2 (28 KO)	Middleweight	WBC and The Ring
+1	7	Manny Pacquiao	54–5–2 (38 KO)	Welterweight	—N/a
-2	8	Adrien Broner	27–0 (22 KO)	Lightweight Welterweight	WBC WBA
—N/a	9	Timothy Bradley	30–0 (12 KO)	Welterweight	WBO
—N/a	10	Canelo Álvarez	42–0–1 (30 KO)	Light middleweight	WBC and The Ring

May 10, 2013
Changes	Rank	Boxer	Record	Weight class	Title(s)
—N/a	1	Floyd Mayweather Jr.	43–0 (26 KO)	Welterweight Light middleweight	WBC WBA (Super)
—N/a	2	Andre Ward	26–0 (14 KO)	Super middleweight	WBA (Super), WBC, and The Ring
—N/a	3	Juan Manuel Márquez	55–6–1 (40 KO)	Light welterweight	WBO
+3	4	Wladimir Klitschko	60–3 (51 KO)	Heavyweight	WBA (Super), IBF, WBO, and The Ring
New	5	Abner Mares	26–0–1 (14 KO)	Featherweight	WBC
-1	6	Adrien Broner	26–0 (22 KO)	Lightweight	WBC
-3	7	Sergio Martínez	50–2–2 (28 KO)	Middleweight	WBC and The Ring
-2	8	Manny Pacquiao	54–5–2 (38 KO)	Welterweight	—N/a
—N/a	9	Timothy Bradley	30–0 (12 KO)	Welterweight	WBO
New	10	Canelo Álvarez	42–0–1 (30 KO)	Light middleweight	WBC and The Ring

April 17, 2013
Changes	Rank	Boxer	Record	Weight class	Title(s)
—N/a	1	Floyd Mayweather Jr.	43–0 (26 KO)	Welterweight Light middleweight	WBC WBA (Super)
—N/a	2	Andre Ward	26–0 (14 KO)	Super middleweight	WBA (Super), WBC, and The Ring
—N/a	3	Juan Manuel Márquez	55–6–1 (40 KO)	Light welterweight	WBO
—N/a	4	Sergio Martínez	50–2–2 (28 KO)	Middleweight	WBC and The Ring
—N/a	5	Adrien Broner	26–0 (22 KO)	Lightweight	WBC
+1	6	Manny Pacquiao	54–5–2 (38 KO)	Welterweight	—N/a
+1	7	Wladimir Klitschko	59–3 (51 KO)	Heavyweight	WBA (Super), IBF, WBO, and The Ring
+1	8	Robert Guerrero	31–1–1 (18 KO)	Welterweight	—N/a
+1	9	Timothy Bradley	30–0 (12 KO)	Welterweight	WBO
-5	10	Nonito Donaire	31–2 (20 KO)	Super bantamweight	—N/a

March 20, 2013
Changes	Rank	Boxer	Record	Weight class	Title(s)
—N/a	1	Floyd Mayweather Jr.	43–0 (26 KO)	Welterweight Light middleweight	WBC WBA (Super)
—N/a	2	Andre Ward	26–0 (14 KO)	Super middleweight	WBA (Super), WBC, and The Ring
—N/a	3	Juan Manuel Márquez	55–6–1 (40 KO)	Light welterweight	WBO
—N/a	4	Sergio Martínez	50–2–2 (28 KO)	Middleweight	WBC and The Ring
—N/a	5	Adrien Broner	25–0 (21 KO)	Lightweight	WBC
—N/a	6	Nonito Donaire	31–1 (20 KO)	Super bantamweight	WBO and The Ring
—N/a	7	Manny Pacquiao	54–5–2 (38 KO)	Welterweight	—N/a
—N/a	8	Wladimir Klitschko	59–3 (51 KO)	Heavyweight	WBA (Super), IBF, WBO, and The Ring
+1	9	Robert Guerrero	31–1–1 (18 KO)	Welterweight	—N/a
-1	10	Timothy Bradley	30–0 (12 KO)	Welterweight	WBO

== 2012 ==
December 11, 2012
Changes	Rank	Boxer	Record	Weight class	Title(s)
+1	1	Floyd Mayweather Jr.	43–0 (26 KO)	Welterweight Light middleweight	WBC WBA (Super)
+1	2	Andre Ward	26–0 (14 KO)	Super middleweight	WBA (Super), WBC, and The Ring
+3	3	Juan Manuel Márquez	55–6–1 (40 KO)	Light welterweight	WBO
—N/a	4	Sergio Martínez	50–2–2 (28 KO)	Middleweight	WBC and The Ring
New	5	Adrien Broner	25–0 (21 KO)	Lightweight	WBC
-1	6	Nonito Donaire	31–1 (20 KO)	Super bantamweight	WBO and The Ring
-5	7	Manny Pacquiao	54–5–2 (38 KO)	Welterweight	—N/a
-1	8	Wladimir Klitschko	59–3 (51 KO)	Heavyweight	WBA (Super), IBF, WBO, and The Ring
-1	9	Timothy Bradley	29–0 (12 KO)	Welterweight	WBO
New	10	Robert Guerrero	31–1–1 (18 KO)	Welterweight	—N/a

November 13, 2012
Changes	Rank	Boxer	Record	Weight class	Title(s)
—N/a	1	Vacant			
—N/a	2	Manny Pacquiao	54–4–2 (38 KO)	Welterweight	—N/a
—N/a	2	Floyd Mayweather Jr.	43–0 (26 KO)	Welterweight Light middleweight	WBC WBA (Super)
—N/a	3	Andre Ward	26–0 (14 KO)	Super middleweight	WBA (Super), WBC, and The Ring
—N/a	4	Sergio Martínez	50–2–2 (28 KO)	Middleweight	WBC and The Ring
—N/a	5	Nonito Donaire	30–1 (19 KO)	Super bantamweight	IBF and WBO
—N/a	6	Juan Manuel Márquez	54–6–1 (39 KO)	Light welterweight	WBO
—N/a	7	Wladimir Klitschko	59–3 (51 KO)	Heavyweight	WBA (Super), IBF, WBO, and The Ring
—N/a	8	Timothy Bradley	29–0 (12 KO)	Welterweight	WBO
—N/a	9	Vitali Klitschko	45–2 (41 KO)	Heavyweight	WBC
New	10	Abner Mares	24–0–1 (13 KO)	Super bantamweight	WBC

September 11, 2012
Changes	Rank	Boxer	Record	Weight class	Title(s)
—N/a	1	Vacant			
—N/a	2	Manny Pacquiao	54–4–2 (38 KO)	Welterweight	—N/a
—N/a	2	Floyd Mayweather Jr.	43–0 (26 KO)	Welterweight Light middleweight	WBC WBA (Super)
+2	3	Andre Ward	26–0 (14 KO)	Super middleweight	WBA (Super), WBC, and The Ring
-1	4	Sergio Martínez	50–2–2 (28 KO)	Middleweight	WBC and The Ring
-1	5	Nonito Donaire	29–1 (18 KO)	Super bantamweight	IBF and WBO
—N/a	6	Juan Manuel Márquez	54–6–1 (39 KO)	Light welterweight	WBO
—N/a	7	Wladimir Klitschko	58–3 (51 KO)	Heavyweight	WBA (Super), IBF, WBO, and The Ring
—N/a	8	Timothy Bradley	29–0 (12 KO)	Welterweight	WBO
—N/a	9	Vitali Klitschko	45–2 (41 KO)	Heavyweight	WBC
New	10	Anselmo Moreno	33–1–1 (12 KO)	Bantamweight	WBA (Super)

May 7, 2012
Changes	Rank	Boxer	Record	Weight class	Title(s)
—N/a	1	Vacant			
-1	2	Manny Pacquiao	54–3–2 (38 KO)	Welterweight	WBO
—N/a	2	Floyd Mayweather Jr.	43–0 (26 KO)	Welterweight Light middleweight	WBC WBA (Super)
—N/a	3	Sergio Martínez	49–2–2 (28 KO)	Middleweight	The Ring
—N/a	4	Nonito Donaire	28–1 (18 KO)	Super bantamweight	WBO
—N/a	5	Andre Ward	25–0 (13 KO)	Super middleweight	WBA (Super), WBC, and The Ring
—N/a	6	Juan Manuel Márquez	54–6–1 (39 KO)	Light welterweight	—N/a
—N/a	7	Wladimir Klitschko	57–3 (50 KO)	Heavyweight	WBA (Super), IBF, WBO, and The Ring
—N/a	8	Timothy Bradley	28–0 (12 KO)	Light welterweight	WBO
—N/a	9	Vitali Klitschko	44–2 (40 KO)	Heavyweight	WBC
—N/a	10	Chad Dawson	31–1 (17 KO)	Light heavyweight	WBC and The Ring

May 1, 2012
Changes	Rank	Boxer	Record	Weight class	Title(s)
—N/a	1	Manny Pacquiao	54–3–2 (38 KO)	Welterweight	WBO
—N/a	2	Floyd Mayweather Jr.	42–0 (26 KO)	Welterweight	WBC
—N/a	3	Sergio Martínez	49–2–2 (28 KO)	Middleweight	The Ring
—N/a	4	Nonito Donaire	28–1 (18 KO)	Super bantamweight	WBO
—N/a	5	Andre Ward	25–0 (13 KO)	Super middleweight	WBA (Super), WBC, and The Ring
—N/a	6	Juan Manuel Márquez	54–6–1 (39 KO)	Light welterweight	—N/a
—N/a	7	Wladimir Klitschko	57–3 (50 KO)	Heavyweight	WBA (Super), IBF, WBO, and The Ring
—N/a	8	Timothy Bradley	28–0 (12 KO)	Light welterweight	WBO
—N/a	9	Vitali Klitschko	44–2 (40 KO)	Heavyweight	WBC
New	10	Chad Dawson	31–1 (17 KO)	Light heavyweight	WBC and The Ring

March 6, 2012
Changes	Rank	Boxer	Record	Weight class	Title(s)
—N/a	1	Manny Pacquiao	54–3–2 (38 KO)	Welterweight	WBO
—N/a	2	Floyd Mayweather Jr.	42–0 (26 KO)	Welterweight	WBC
—N/a	3	Sergio Martínez	48–2–2 (27 KO)	Middleweight	The Ring
—N/a	4	Nonito Donaire	28–1 (18 KO)	Super bantamweight	WBO
—N/a	5	Andre Ward	25–0 (13 KO)	Super middleweight	WBA (Super), WBC, and The Ring
—N/a	6	Juan Manuel Márquez	53–6–1 (39 KO)	Lightweight	The Ring
—N/a	7	Wladimir Klitschko	56–3 (49 KO)	Heavyweight	WBA (Super), IBF, WBO, and The Ring
+1	8	Timothy Bradley	28–0 (12 KO)	Light welterweight	WBO
+1	9	Vitali Klitschko	44–2 (40 KO)	Heavyweight	WBC
New	10	Yuriorkis Gamboa	21–0 (16 KO)	Super featherweight	—N/a

== 2011 ==
December 19, 2011
Changes	Rank	Boxer	Record	Weight class	Title(s)
—N/a	1	Manny Pacquiao	54–3–2 (38 KO)	Welterweight	WBO
—N/a	2	Floyd Mayweather Jr.	42–0 (26 KO)	Welterweight	WBC
—N/a	3	Sergio Martínez	48–2–2 (27 KO)	Middleweight	The Ring
—N/a	4	Nonito Donaire	27–1 (18 KO)	Bantamweight	—N/a
+4	5	Andre Ward	25–0 (13 KO)	Super middleweight	WBA (Super), WBC, and The Ring
-1	6	Juan Manuel Márquez	53–6–1 (39 KO)	Lightweight	WBA (Super), WBO, and The Ring
-1	7	Wladimir Klitschko	56–3 (49 KO)	Heavyweight	WBA (Super), IBF, WBO, and The Ring
-1	8	Pongsaklek Wonjongkam	83–3–1 (45 KO)	Flyweight	WBC and The Ring
-1	9	Timothy Bradley	28–0 (12 KO)	Light welterweight	WBO
—N/a	10	Vitali Klitschko	43–2 (40 KO)	Heavyweight	WBC

December 13, 2011
Changes	Rank	Boxer	Record	Weight class	Title(s)
—N/a	1	Manny Pacquiao	54–3–2 (38 KO)	Welterweight	WBO
—N/a	2	Floyd Mayweather Jr.	42–0 (26 KO)	Welterweight	WBC
—N/a	3	Sergio Martínez	48–2–2 (27 KO)	Middleweight	The Ring
—N/a	4	Nonito Donaire	27–1 (18 KO)	Bantamweight	—N/a
—N/a	5	Juan Manuel Márquez	53–6–1 (39 KO)	Lightweight	WBA (Super), WBO, and The Ring
—N/a	6	Wladimir Klitschko	56–3 (49 KO)	Heavyweight	WBA (Super), IBF, WBO, and The Ring
—N/a	7	Pongsaklek Wonjongkam	83–3–1 (45 KO)	Flyweight	WBC and The Ring
—N/a	8	Timothy Bradley	28–0 (12 KO)	Light welterweight	WBO
+1	9	Andre Ward	24–0 (13 KO)	Super middleweight	WBA (Super)
New	10	Vitali Klitschko	43–2 (40 KO)	Heavyweight	WBC

October 25, 2011
Changes	Rank	Boxer	Record	Weight class	Title(s)
—N/a	1	Manny Pacquiao	53–3–2 (38 KO)	Welterweight	WBO
—N/a	2	Floyd Mayweather Jr.	42–0 (26 KO)	Welterweight	WBC
—N/a	3	Sergio Martínez	48–2–2 (27 KO)	Middleweight	The Ring
—N/a	4	Nonito Donaire	27–1 (18 KO)	Bantamweight	—N/a
—N/a	5	Juan Manuel Márquez	53–5–1 (38 KO)	Lightweight	WBA (Super), WBO, and The Ring
—N/a	6	Wladimir Klitschko	56–3 (49 KO)	Heavyweight	WBA (Super), IBF, WBO, and The Ring
+1	7	Pongsaklek Wonjongkam	83–3–1 (45 KO)	Flyweight	WBC and The Ring
-1	8	Timothy Bradley	27–0 (11 KO)	Light welterweight	WBO
—N/a	9	Giovani Segura	28–1–1 (24 KO)	Light flyweight	WBO and The Ring
—N/a	10	Andre Ward	24–0 (13 KO)	Super middleweight	WBA (Super)

September 20, 2011
Changes	Rank	Boxer	Record	Weight class	Title(s)
—N/a	1	Manny Pacquiao	52–3–2 (38 KO)	Welterweight	WBO
New	2	Floyd Mayweather Jr.	42–0 (26 KO)	Welterweight	WBC
-1	3	Sergio Martínez	47–2–2 (26 KO)	Middleweight	The Ring
-1	4	Nonito Donaire	26–1 (18 KO)	Bantamweight	WBC and WBO
-1	5	Juan Manuel Márquez	52–5–1 (38 KO)	Lightweight	WBA (Super), WBO, and The Ring
-1	6	Wladimir Klitschko	56–3 (49 KO)	Heavyweight	WBA (Super), IBF, WBO, and The Ring
-1	7	Timothy Bradley	27–0 (11 KO)	Light welterweight	WBO
-1	8	Pongsaklek Wonjongkam	82–3–1 (45 KO)	Flyweight	WBC and The Ring
-1	9	Giovani Segura	28–1–1 (24 KO)	Light flyweight	WBO and The Ring
-1	10	Andre Ward	24–0 (13 KO)	Super middleweight	WBA (Super)

May 24, 2011
Changes	Rank	Boxer	Record	Weight class	Title(s)
—N/a	1	Manny Pacquiao	52–3–2 (38 KO)	Welterweight	WBO
—N/a	2	Sergio Martínez	47–2–2 (26 KO)	Middleweight	The Ring
—N/a	3	Nonito Donaire	26–1 (18 KO)	Bantamweight	WBC and WBO
—N/a	4	Juan Manuel Márquez	52–5–1 (38 KO)	Lightweight	WBA (Super), WBO, and The Ring
—N/a	5	Wladimir Klitschko	56–3 (49 KO)	Heavyweight	WBA (Super), IBF, WBO, and The Ring
—N/a	6	Timothy Bradley	27–0 (11 KO)	Light welterweight	WBC and WBO
—N/a	7	Pongsaklek Wonjongkam	81–3–1 (44 KO)	Flyweight	WBC and The Ring
—N/a	8	Giovani Segura	28–1–1 (24 KO)	Light flyweight	WBO and The Ring
—N/a	9	Andre Ward	24–0 (13 KO)	Super middleweight	WBA (Super)
New	10	Bernard Hopkins	52–5–2–1 (32 KO)	Light heavyweight	WBC and The Ring

May 3, 2011
Changes	Rank	Boxer	Record	Weight class	Title(s)
—N/a	1	Manny Pacquiao	52–3–2 (38 KO)	Welterweight	WBO
+1	2	Sergio Martínez	47–2–2 (26 KO)	Middleweight	The Ring
+1	3	Nonito Donaire	26–1 (18 KO)	Bantamweight	WBC and WBO
+1	4	Juan Manuel Márquez	52–5–1 (38 KO)	Lightweight	WBA (Super), WBO, and The Ring
+2	5	Wladimir Klitschko	55–3 (49 KO)	Heavyweight	IBF, WBO, and The Ring
+2	6	Timothy Bradley	27–0 (11 KO)	Light welterweight	WBC and WBO
-1	7	Pongsaklek Wonjongkam	80–3–1 (44 KO)	Flyweight	WBC and The Ring
+2	8	Giovani Segura	27–1–1 (23 KO)	Light flyweight	WBO and The Ring
New	9	Andre Ward	23–0 (13 KO)	Super middleweight	WBA (Super)
New	10	Miguel Cotto	36–2 (29 KO)	Light middleweight	WBA (Super)

March 14, 2011
Changes	Rank	Boxer	Record	Weight class	Title(s)
—N/a	1	Manny Pacquiao	52–3–2 (38 KO)	Welterweight	WBO
—N/a	2	Floyd Mayweather Jr.	41–0 (25 KO)	Welterweight	—N/a
+1	3	Sergio Martínez	47–2–2 (26 KO)	Middleweight	The Ring
-1	4	Nonito Donaire	26–1 (18 KO)	Bantamweight	WBC and WBO
—N/a	5	Juan Manuel Márquez	52–5–1 (38 KO)	Lightweight	WBA (Super), WBO, and The Ring
—N/a	6	Pongsaklek Wonjongkam	79–3–1 (44 KO)	Flyweight	WBC and The Ring
—N/a	7	Wladimir Klitschko	55–3 (49 KO)	Heavyweight	IBF, WBO, and The Ring
—N/a	8	Timothy Bradley	27–0 (11 KO)	Light welterweight	WBC and WBO
—N/a	9	Juan Manuel López	30–0 (27 KO)	Featherweight	WBO
—N/a	10	Giovani Segura	26–1–1 (22 KO)	Light flyweight	WBO and The Ring

February 20, 2011
Changes	Rank	Boxer	Record	Weight class	Title(s)
—N/a	1	Manny Pacquiao	52–3–2 (38 KO)	Welterweight	WBO
—N/a	2	Floyd Mayweather Jr.	41–0 (25 KO)	Welterweight	—N/a
+2	3	Nonito Donaire	26–1 (18 KO)	Bantamweight	WBC and WBO
-1	4	Sergio Martínez	46–2–2 (25 KO)	Middleweight	The Ring
-1	5	Juan Manuel Márquez	52–5–1 (38 KO)	Lightweight	WBA (Super), WBO, and The Ring
—N/a	6	Pongsaklek Wonjongkam	78–3–1 (43 KO)	Flyweight	WBC and The Ring
+1	7	Wladimir Klitschko	55–3 (49 KO)	Heavyweight	IBF, WBO, and The Ring
+1	8	Timothy Bradley	27–0 (11 KO)	Light welterweight	WBC and WBO
+1	9	Juan Manuel López	30–0 (27 KO)	Featherweight	WBO
New	10	Giovani Segura	26–1–1 (22 KO)	Light flyweight	WBO and The Ring

== 2010 ==
November 22, 2010
Changes	Rank	Boxer	Record	Weight class	Title(s)
—N/a	1	Manny Pacquiao	52–3–2 (38 KO)	Welterweight Light middleweight	WBO WBC
—N/a	2	Floyd Mayweather Jr.	41–0 (25 KO)	Welterweight	—N/a
+3	3	Sergio Martínez	46–2–2 (25 KO)	Middleweight	WBC and The Ring
-1	4	Juan Manuel Márquez	51–5–1 (37 KO)	Lightweight	WBA (Super), WBO, and The Ring
-1	5	Nonito Donaire	24–1 (16 KO)	Super flyweight	—N/a
+1	6	Pongsaklek Wonjongkam	77–3–1 (43 KO)	Flyweight	WBC and The Ring
+1	7	Fernando Montiel	43–2–2 (33 KO)	Bantamweight	WBC and WBO
+1	8	Wladimir Klitschko	55–3 (49 KO)	Heavyweight	IBF, WBO, and The Ring
+1	9	Timothy Bradley	26–0 (11 KO)	Light welterweight	WBO
New	10	Juan Manuel López	30–0 (27 KO)	Featherweight	WBO

September 23, 2010
Changes	Rank	Boxer	Record	Weight class	Title(s)
—N/a	1	Manny Pacquiao	51–3–2 (38 KO)	Welterweight	WBO
—N/a	2	Floyd Mayweather Jr.	41–0 (25 KO)	Welterweight	—N/a
—N/a	3	Juan Manuel Márquez	51–5–1 (37 KO)	Lightweight	WBA (Super), WBO, and The Ring
—N/a	4	Nonito Donaire	24–1 (16 KO)	Super flyweight	—N/a
+1	5	Paul Williams	39–1 (27 KO)	Middleweight	—N/a
+1	6	Sergio Martínez	45–2–2 (24 KO)	Middleweight	WBC and The Ring
+1	7	Pongsaklek Wonjongkam	76–3–1 (40 KO)	Flyweight	WBC and The Ring
+1	8	Fernando Montiel	43–2–2 (33 KO)	Bantamweight	WBC and WBO
+1	9	Wladimir Klitschko	55–3 (49 KO)	Heavyweight	IBF, WBO, and The Ring
New	10	Timothy Bradley	26–0 (11 KO)	Light welterweight	WBO

August 17, 2010
Changes	Rank	Boxer	Record	Weight class	Title(s)
—N/a	1	Manny Pacquiao	51–3–2 (38 KO)	Welterweight	WBO
—N/a	2	Floyd Mayweather Jr.	41–0 (25 KO)	Welterweight	—N/a
—N/a	3	Juan Manuel Márquez	51–5–1 (37 KO)	Lightweight	WBA (Super), WBO, and The Ring
—N/a	4	Nonito Donaire	24–1 (16 KO)	Super flyweight	—N/a
—N/a	5	Shane Mosley	46–6 (39 KO)	Welterweight	—N/a
+1	6	Paul Williams	39–1 (27 KO)	Middleweight	—N/a
+1	7	Sergio Martínez	45–2–2 (24 KO)	Middleweight	WBC and The Ring
+1	8	Pongsaklek Wonjongkam	76–3–1 (40 KO)	Flyweight	WBC and The Ring
+1	9	Fernando Montiel	43–2–2 (33 KO)	Bantamweight	WBC and WBO
New	10	Wladimir Klitschko	54–3 (48 KO)	Heavyweight	IBF, WBO, and The Ring

July 19, 2010
Changes	Rank	Boxer	Record	Weight class	Title(s)
—N/a	1	Manny Pacquiao	51–3–2 (38 KO)	Light welterweight Welterweight	The Ring WBO
—N/a	2	Floyd Mayweather Jr.	41–0 (25 KO)	Welterweight	—N/a
—N/a	3	Juan Manuel Márquez	50–5–1 (37 KO)	Lightweight	WBA (Super), WBO, and The Ring
—N/a	4	Nonito Donaire	24–1 (16 KO)	Super flyweight	—N/a
—N/a	5	Shane Mosley	46–6 (39 KO)	Welterweight	—N/a
—N/a	6	Chad Dawson	29–0 (17 KO)	Light heavyweight	—N/a
—N/a	7	Paul Williams	39–1 (27 KO)	Middleweight	—N/a
—N/a	8	Sergio Martínez	45–2–2 (24 KO)	Middleweight	WBC and The Ring
—N/a	9	Pongsaklek Wonjongkam	76–3–1 (40 KO)	Flyweight	WBC and The Ring
New	10	Fernando Montiel	43–2–2 (33 KO)	Bantamweight	WBC and WBO

May 4, 2010
Changes	Rank	Boxer	Record	Weight class	Title(s)
—N/a	1	Manny Pacquiao	51–3–2 (38 KO)	Light welterweight Welterweight	The Ring WBO
—N/a	2	Floyd Mayweather Jr.	41–0 (25 KO)	Welterweight	—N/a
+1	3	Juan Manuel Márquez	50–5–1 (37 KO)	Lightweight	WBA (Super), WBO, and The Ring
+1	4	Nonito Donaire	23–1 (15 KO)	Super flyweight	—N/a
-2	5	Shane Mosley	46–6 (39 KO)	Welterweight	WBA (Super)
+2	6	Chad Dawson	29–0 (17 KO)	Light heavyweight	—N/a
+2	7	Paul Williams	38–1 (27 KO)	Middleweight	—N/a
New	8	Sergio Martínez	45–2–2 (24 KO)	Middleweight	WBC, WBO, and The Ring
New	9	Pongsaklek Wonjongkam	75–3–1 (39 KO)	Flyweight	WBC and The Ring
—N/a	10	Celestino Caballero	34–2 (23 KO)	Super bantamweight	WBA (Super)

April 5, 2010
Changes	Rank	Boxer	Record	Weight class	Title(s)
—N/a	1	Manny Pacquiao	51–3–2 (38 KO)	Light welterweight Welterweight	The Ring WBO
—N/a	2	Floyd Mayweather Jr.	40–0 (25 KO)	Welterweight	—N/a
—N/a	3	Shane Mosley	46–5 (39 KO)	Welterweight	WBA (Super)
+1	4	Juan Manuel Márquez	50–5–1 (37 KO)	Lightweight	WBA (Super), WBO, and The Ring
+1	5	Nonito Donaire	23–1 (15 KO)	Super flyweight	—N/a
-2	6	Bernard Hopkins	51–5–1–1 (32 KO)	Light heavyweight	—N/a
—N/a	7	Miguel Cotto	34–2 (27 KO)	Welterweight	—N/a
—N/a	8	Chad Dawson	29–0 (17 KO)	Light heavyweight	—N/a
—N/a	9	Paul Williams	38–1 (27 KO)	Light middleweight	—N/a
—N/a	10	Celestino Caballero	33–2 (23 KO)	Super bantamweight	WBA (Super)

February 21, 2010
Changes	Rank	Boxer	Record	Weight class	Title(s)
—N/a	1	Manny Pacquiao	50–3–2 (38 KO)	Light welterweight Welterweight	The Ring WBO
—N/a	2	Floyd Mayweather Jr.	40–0 (25 KO)	Welterweight	—N/a
—N/a	3	Shane Mosley	46–5 (39 KO)	Welterweight	WBA (Super)
—N/a	4	Bernard Hopkins	50–5–1–1 (32 KO)	Light heavyweight	—N/a
—N/a	5	Juan Manuel Márquez	50–5–1 (37 KO)	Lightweight	WBA (Super), WBO, and The Ring
—N/a	6	Nonito Donaire	23–1 (15 KO)	Super flyweight	—N/a
—N/a	7	Miguel Cotto	34–2 (27 KO)	Welterweight	—N/a
+1	8	Chad Dawson	29–0 (17 KO)	Light heavyweight	—N/a
+1	9	Paul Williams	38–1 (27 KO)	Light middleweight	—N/a
-2	10	Celestino Caballero	33–2 (23 KO)	Super bantamweight	WBA (Unified)

== See also ==
- List of The Ring pound for pound rankings
- List of The Ring pound for pound rankings (1990s)
- List of The Ring pound for pound rankings (2000s)
- List of The Ring pound for pound rankings (2020s)
- List of fights between two The Ring pound for pound boxers
- Boxing pound for pound rankings
- The Ring
- List of current world boxing champions
- List of undisputed boxing champions
- List of WBA world champions
- List of WBC world champions
- List of IBF world champions
- List of WBO world champions
- List of The Ring world champions
