= Alberto Guevara =

Mexican boxer (born 1990)

Personal information
- Nickname: Metro
- Born: Alberto Gamaliel Guevara Rocha; 15 July 1990 (age 36) Mazatlán, Sinaloa, Mexico
- Height: 1.68 m (5 ft 6 in)

Boxing career
- Reach: 170 cm (67 in)

Boxing record
- Total fights: 38
- Wins: 28
- Win by KO: 13
- Losses: 10

Alberto Gamaliel Guevara Rocha (born 15 July 1990) is a Mexican professional boxer who challenged twice for a bantamweight world title in 2012 and 2013.

== Professional career ==
On 15 December 2012, Guevara was defeated by Leo Santa Cruz in a fight for the IBF Bantamweight championship of the world. On 10 November 2013, Guevara was knocked out by Shinsuke Yamanaka in a WBC bantamweight title fight.

Guevara was scheduled to fight Randy Caballero for the IBF bantamweight title in February 2015. This would have been Guevara's third opportunity for a world title. However, Caballero had to pull out of the fight due to an ankle injury and subsequent surgery. Guevara lost to Emmanuel Rodríguez in June 2016, bringing his record up to 24–3.

On 10 January 2026 at the Barclays Center on the undercard of Subriel Matias vs Dalton Smith. Guevara faced undefeated rising featherweight star, Keith Colon, Guevara lost the bout by TKO in the 7th round. Guevara was knocked down three times before the stoppage, twice in the 5th and once in the 6th. His last outing came on 29 August, at LIVE Casino in Philadelphia. Guevara fought the 21/1 Dylan Price, Guevara lost by unanimous decision, 79–71 on all judges scorecards.
