= Christian Esquivel =

Mexican professional boxer

Personal information
- Nickname: Italiano
- Born: Christian Esquivel Valdes; July 6, 1974 (age 52) Temoaya, State of Mexico, Mexico
- Height: 5 ft 5 1/2 in (1.7 m)
- Weight: Super flyweight Bantamweight; Super bantamweight

Boxing career
- Reach: 5 ft 6 in (1.68 m)
- Stance: Orthodox

Boxing record
- Total fights: 52
- Wins: 30
- Win by KO: 23
- Losses: 21
- Draws: 1
- No contests: 0

Christian Esquivel Valdes (born September 3, 1985) is a Mexican professional boxer.

He lost to Shinsuke Yamanaka for the WBC bantamweight world title.

Esquivel has a losses against Manny Robles III and Rey Vargas.
