= Shinsuke Yamanaka =

Japanese boxer (born 1982)

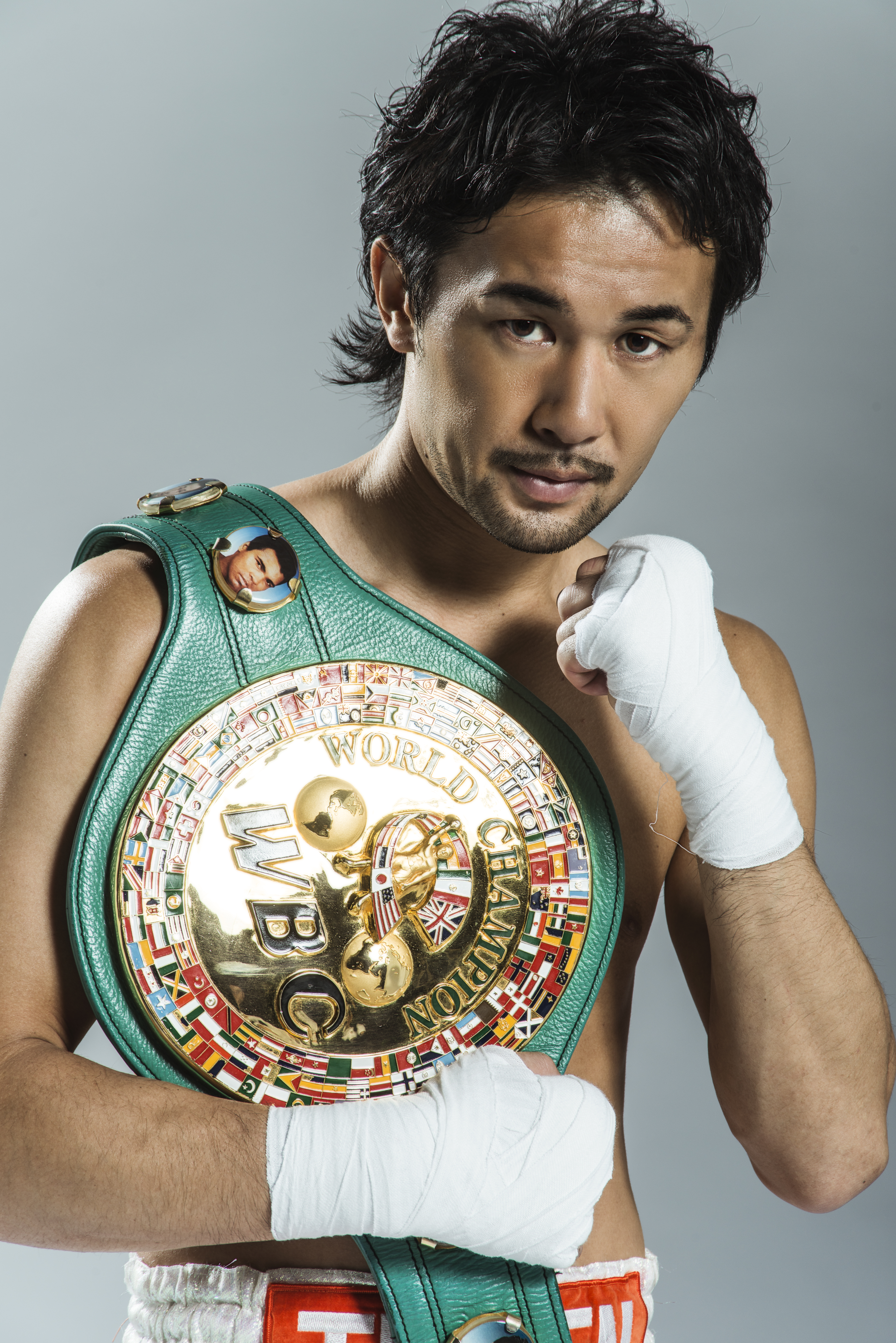

Personal information
- Nickname: Kami no hidari ("God's left")
- Born: 山中 慎介; 11 October 1982 (age 44) Konan, Shiga, Japan
- Height: 5 ft 7 1/2 in (171 cm)
- Weight: Bantamweight

Boxing career
- Reach: 68 1/2 in (174 cm)
- Stance: Southpaw

Boxing record
- Total fights: 31
- Wins: 27
- Win by KO: 19
- Losses: 2
- Draws: 2

Shinsuke Yamanaka (山中 慎介, Yamanaka Shinsuke; born October 11, 1982) is a Japanese former professional boxer who competed from 2006 to 2018. He held the WBC bantamweight title from 2011 to 2017, a reign where he made twelve successful defences and a reign which is the fourth longest in boxing's bantamweight division. He also held The Ring bantamweight title twice between 2016 and 2018.

Stylistically, Yamanaka was known as a brawler who sought to stand and trade punches with his opponents. As a southpaw, his left cross was particularly renowned as a devastating punch. He was considered an entertaining fighter, with many of his fights featuring several knockdowns. However, he also showed the ability to box on the outside. Yamanaka's height and reach gave him a significant physical advantage over most fighters at his weight class.

== Amateur career ==
Yamanaka became interested in the sport of boxing as a result of seeing the likes Joichiro Tatsuyoshi, Mike Tyson, and Naseem Hamed on TV. He amassed an amateur record of 34–13. During this time, he defeated future world champion Takahiro Ao. However, Yamanaka has referred to his amateur career as "average".

== Professional career ==
Yamanaka trains at the storied Teiken Gym in Tokyo under former pro boxer and Japanese nation champion Yamato Shin. Yamanaka has currently made twelve successful consecutive defences of the WBC and The Ring bantamweight titles and previously ranked 9th in The Ring pound for pound listings.

=== Early career ===
Yamanaka debuted at the age of 23 in Tokyo's Korakuen Hall, where he would fight 14 of his first 15 fights. Over his first 8 pro bouts he amassed a 6-0-2 with 2 razor-thin decisions. Yamanaka would improve on the ring by stopping his next 5 opponents. On June 20, 2010, Yamanaka defeated Mikio Yasuda to win the Japanese bantamweight title. He'd only defend that title once against highly touted prospect Ryosuke Iwasa, stopping him in 10 rounds.

=== Yamanaka vs. Esquivel ===
Yamanaka captured the vacant WBC bantamweight title in his first world title shot against Mexico's Christian Esquivel via an eleventh-round technical knockout after knocking him down in the sixth and eleventh rounds at the Yoyogi National Stadium Second Gymnasium in Tokyo on November 6, 2011. Yamanaka was presented with the Rookie Award both in the forty-fourth Japan Professional Sports Awards and Japan's Boxer of the Year in 2011.

=== Yamanaka vs. Darchinyan, Rojas ===
Yamanaka's first defense came against former flyweight and super flyweight titlist Vic Darchinyan in April 2012. Darchinyan had unsuccessfully attempted to become a 3-weight world champion twice before, losing by decision to Abner Mares and Anselmo Moreno. Yamanaka won the fight by unanimous decision (117-111, 116–112, 116–112), but Darchinyan would become the first fighter to last 12 rounds against the WBC champion since 2008. Yamanaka defended his title once more in 2012 against Tomas Rojas, knocking the former WBC super flyweight champion out in the 7th round with a left-hand cross.

=== Various defenses ===
Yamanaka would go on to face Malcolm Tuñacao on his third defense. Yamanaka would end up winning by technical knockout on the 12th round after knocking Tuñacao down three times in the course of the fight. Yamanaka's fourth defense came against José Nieves, whom he knocked out in the first with an overhand left. Yamanaka's final defense of 2013 would be against Alberto Guevara. Yamanaka would once again knock his opponent down three times before finishing him with a left-hand in the 9th. In 2014, Yamanaka notched 2 more defenses. The first came against Stephen Jamoye, whom he knocked down 4 times before stopping him in the 9th round. The second one would come against Suriyan Sor Rungvisai. Yamanaka dropped Sor Rungvisai 3 times but was unable to finish him, winning by unanimous decision (116-108, 115–109, 114–110) but ending a 5 fight knockout-streak. His first defense of 2015 came against Diego Santillan, who touched the canvas twice before being stopped on the 7th round.

=== Yamanaka vs. Moreno ===
Yamanaka would run into his toughest fight yet in his ninth title defense against former WBA champion Anselmo Moreno. The fight took place on September 22, 2015, in Ōta, Tokyo. Moreno, a classical out-boxer, kept Yamanaka from landing his signature left-hand using his jab and movement to neutralize the WBC champion. Moreno would pull ahead on the scorecard by landing combinations during the middle rounds. Yamanaka and Moreno traded power punches in the latter third of the fight, with Yamanaka seemingly getting the better of the fight during this stretch. The final round would end with both fighters visibly tired and resorting to holding. With no clear winner, the fight was ruled a controversial split decision (115-113, 115–113, 113–115) won by Yamanaka. The three judges were all from the United States, but many observers and Moreno himself felt they had favored the local fighter.

=== Yamanaka vs. Solís ===
Yamanaka's next defense would come against Liborio Solís on March 4, 2016. Solís proved to be another tough test for the WBC champion. Yamanaka sought to establish himself early, winning the first round and knocking his opponent down in the second. However, Solís would come back and drop Yamanaka with a right-hand in the third round. Yamanaka seemed to recover, but late on that same round he was dropped again by a well-timed counter from Solís. Yamanaka would rally after that round, proceeding to drop Solís once more in the 9th round. Both fighters would continue trading punches until the final bell, but Yamanaka had dominated most of the fight and he was given a unanimous decision (117-107, 117–107, 117–107).

=== Yamanaka vs. Moreno II ===
Roughly 2 months after the Yamanaka-Solís bout, Anselmo Moreno had defeated previous WBC title challenger Soriyan Sor Rungvisai to become Yamanaka's mandatory challenger, setting up a rematch. The rematch would take place at the Edion Arena in September 2016. Moreno tried to stifle Yamanaka with his jab once again but Yamanaka had more success landing counters, even dropping Moreno once on the opening round. The two fighters would go on to trade knockdowns, with the defending champion going down in the 4th and the challenger going down in the 6th. The seventh round proved to the decisive one, as Yamanaka knocked Moreno down twice more before the referee waved the fight off. With this seventh-round technical knockout victory, Yamanaka won the vacant The Ring bantamweight title.

=== Yamanaka vs. Carlson ===
On March 2, 2017, Yamanaka fought overmatched opponent Carlos Carlson to a seventh-round TKO win. Carlson was ranked #6 by the WBC. This made for Yamanaka's twelfth successful title defense in a row, the second most title defenses in a row by a Japanese boxer ever.

=== Yamanaka vs. Nery ===
Yamanaka's 13th defense would come against #1 WBC contender Luis Nery in Kyoto. With this fight, Yamanaka sought to equal Yoko Gushiken's record for most successful defenses by a Japanese world champion. The bout started with both fighters trading back and forth combinations, but at the start of the fourth round Nery rocked Yamanaka with a left cross. After a brief respite in which Yamanaka seemed to regain control, Nery continued pummeling the defending champion, who was unable to defend himself. Yamanaka's corner eventually rushed into the ring to protect their fighter, giving Nery the win. The fight was seen by an audience of over 7 million people in Japan. In a press conference after the fight, Yamanaka stated that he was unhappy with the stoppage but he didn't blame his trainers for it. Yamanaka also said he was considering retirement but he was open to a rematch with Nery.

Following Nery testing positive for zilpaterol, a banned substance, The Ring reinstated Yamanaka as their bantamweight champion. On October 31, the WBC made its final ruling on Nery's positive test. The sanctioning body concluded that the positive test was due to contaminated food. Consequently, the result of the Yamanaka-Nery title bout wouldn't be overturned but the WBC ordered a rematch.

Days after the ruling, Yamanaka confirmed he wouldn't retire and would come back for the rematch.

=== Yamanaka vs. Nery II ===
During the weigh-in prior to the bout, Nery came in at 123 pounds, five pounds over the limit for the bantamweight division. Despite cutting two pounds before the final weigh-in, he was stripped of his title prior to the bout for failing to make weight. The fight continued regardless, leaving Yamanaka with a chance to regain the title should he win the fight.

Nery knocked Yamanaka down with an overhand left near the end of the first round, and although Yamanaka beat the count, he did not appear to recover during the break, and was knocked down a further three times in the next round before the referee called off the fight at 1:03 into the second round.

After the fight, the WBC announced that it would be suspending Nery indefinitely for his failure to make weight, removing him from their ranking system and preventing him from competing for any WBC belt.

Yamanaka announced his retirement following the fight.

== Professional boxing record ==
| 31 fights | 27 wins | 2 losses |
|---|---|---|
| By knockout | 19 | 2 |
| By decision | 8 | 0 |
| Draws | 2 | |

| No. | Result | Record | Opponent | Type | Round, time | Date | Location | Notes |
|---|---|---|---|---|---|---|---|---|
| 31 | Loss | 27–2–2 | Luis Nery | TKO | 2 (12), 1:02 | Mar 1, 2018 | Ryōgoku Kokugikan, Tokyo, Japan | Lost The Ring bantamweight title; For vacant WBC bantamweight title |
| 30 | Loss | 27–1–2 | Luis Nery | TKO | 4 (12), 2:29 | Aug 15, 2017 | Shimadzu Arena, Kyoto, Japan | Lost WBC and The Ring bantamweight titles; Yamanaka later reinstated as champion by The Ring after Nery failed a drug test |
| 29 | Win | 27–0–2 | Carlos Carlson | TKO | 7 (12), 0:57 | Mar 2, 2017 | Ryōgoku Kokugikan, Tokyo, Japan | Retained WBC and The Ring bantamweight titles |
| 28 | Win | 26–0–2 | Anselmo Moreno | TKO | 7 (12), 1:09 | Sep 16, 2016 | Edion Arena, Osaka, Japan | Retained WBC bantamweight title; Won vacant The Ring bantamweight title |
| 27 | Win | 25–0–2 | Liborio Solís | UD | 12 | Mar 4, 2016 | Shimadzu Arena, Kyoto, Japan | Retained WBC bantamweight title |
| 26 | Win | 24–0–2 | Anselmo Moreno | SD | 12 | Sep 22, 2015 | Ota City General Gymnasium, Tokyo, Japan | Retained WBC bantamweight title |
| 25 | Win | 23–0–2 | Diego Santillan | KO | 7 (12), 0:36 | Apr 16, 2015 | Bodymaker Colosseum, Osaka, Japan | Retained WBC bantamweight title |
| 24 | Win | 22–0–2 | Suriyan Sor Rungvisai | UD | 12 | Oct 22, 2014 | Yoyogi National Gymnasium, Tokyo, Japan | Retained WBC bantamweight title |
| 23 | Win | 21–0–2 | Stephane Jamoye | TKO | 9 (12), 0:11 | Apr 23, 2014 | Jō Hall, Osaka, Japan | Retained WBC bantamweight title |
| 22 | Win | 20–0–2 | Alberto Guevara | KO | 9 (12), 0:25 | Nov 10, 2013 | Ryōgoku Kokugikan, Tokyo, Japan | Retained WBC bantamweight title |
| 21 | Win | 19–0–2 | Jose Nieves | KO | 1 (12), 2:40 | Aug 12, 2013 | Ota City General Gymnasium, Tokyo, Japan | Retained WBC bantamweight title |
| 20 | Win | 18–0–2 | Malcolm Tuñacao | TKO | 12 (12), 1:57 | Apr 8, 2013 | Ryōgoku Kokugikan, Tokyo, Japan | Retained WBC bantamweight title |
| 19 | Win | 17–0–2 | Tomás Rojas | KO | 7 (12), 0:36 | Nov 3, 2012 | Xebio Arena, Sendai, Japan | Retained WBC bantamweight title |
| 18 | Win | 16–0–2 | Vic Darchinyan | UD | 12 | Apr 6, 2012 | International Forum, Tokyo, Japan | Retained WBC bantamweight title |
| 17 | Win | 15–0–2 | Christian Esquivel | TKO | 11 (12), 1:28 | Nov 6, 2011 | Yoyogi National Gymnasium, Tokyo, Japan | Won vacant WBC bantamweight title |
| 16 | Win | 14–0–2 | Ryosuke Iwasa | TKO | 10 (10), 1:28 | Mar 5, 2011 | Korakuen Hall, Tokyo, Japan | Retained Japanese bantamweight title |
| 15 | Win | 13–0–2 | José Silveira | RTD | 9 (10), 3:00 | Oct 24, 2010 | Ryōgoku Kokugikan, Tokyo, Japan | |
| 14 | Win | 12–0–2 | Mikio Yasuda | TKO | 7 (10), 0:50 | Jun 20, 2010 | Sumiyoshi Ward Center, Osaka, Japan | Won Japanese bantamweight title |
| 13 | Win | 11–0–2 | Kazuharu Morimoto | KO | 1 (8), 1:44 | Mar 6, 2010 | Korakuen Hall, Tokyo, Japan | |
| 12 | Win | 10–0–2 | Yuta Uetani | TKO | 1 (8), 2:02 | Nov 7, 2009 | Korakuen Hall, Tokyo, Japan | |
| 11 | Win | 9–0–2 | Masanori Murata | TKO | 1 (8), 2:17 | Jul 4, 2009 | Korakuen Hall, Tokyo, Japan | |
| 10 | Win | 8–0–2 | Wanpadechsuk Sithsaithong | TKO | 3 (8), 1:39 | Mar 21, 2009 | Korakuen Hall, Tokyo, Japan | |
| 9 | Win | 7–0–2 | Ryuichi Funai | TKO | 7 (8), 2:54 | Jan 17, 2009 | Korakuen Hall, Tokyo, Japan | |
| 8 | Win | 6–0–2 | Zaragoza Uema | UD | 8 | Oct 4, 2008 | Korakuen Hall, Tokyo, Japan | |
| 7 | Draw | 5–0–2 | Kenichi Yamaguchi | PTS | 8 | Apr 22, 2008 | Korakuen Hall, Tokyo, Japan | |
| 6 | Win | 5–0–1 | Toyoto Shiraishi | MD | 8 | Oct 31, 2007 | Korakuen Hall, Tokyo, Japan | |
| 5 | Win | 4–0–1 | Yoichi Oguma | SD | 6 | Aug 29, 2007 | Korakuen Hall, Tokyo, Japan | |
| 4 | Win | 3–0–1 | Takeo Sato | TKO | 2 (8), 2:34 | Apr 7, 2007 | Korakuen Hall, Tokyo, Japan | |
| 3 | Win | 2–0–1 | Yuta Sato | TKO | 2 (6), 0:41 | Dec 16, 2006 | Korakuen Hall, Tokyo, Japan | |
| 2 | Draw | 1–0–1 | Keiji Yokomamura | PTS | 5 | Aug 23, 2006 | Korakuen Hall, Tokyo, Japan | |
| 1 | Win | 1–0 | Hitoshi Takahashi | UD | 6 | Jan 7, 2006 | Korakuen Hall, Tokyo, Japan | |

== See also ==
- Boxing in Japan
- List of Japanese boxing world champions
- List of southpaw stance boxers
- List of world bantamweight boxing champions

Sporting positions
Regional boxing titles
| Vacant Title last held by Mikio Yasuda | Japanese bantamweight champion June 20, 2010 – August 2011; Vacated | Vacant Title next held by Ryosuke Iwasa |
World boxing titles
| Vacant Title last held by Nonito Donaire | WBC bantamweight champion November 6, 2011 – August 15, 2017 | Succeeded by Luis Nery |
| Vacant Title last held by Bernardo Piñango | The Ring bantamweight champion September 16, 2016 – August 15, 2017 | Succeeded by Luis Nery |
| Preceded by Luis Nery stripped | The Ring bantamweight champion September 26, 2017 – March 1, 2018; Via reinstatement Vacant after loss to Nery | Vacant Title next held by Naoya Inoue |
